= List of 2019 SEA Games medal winners =

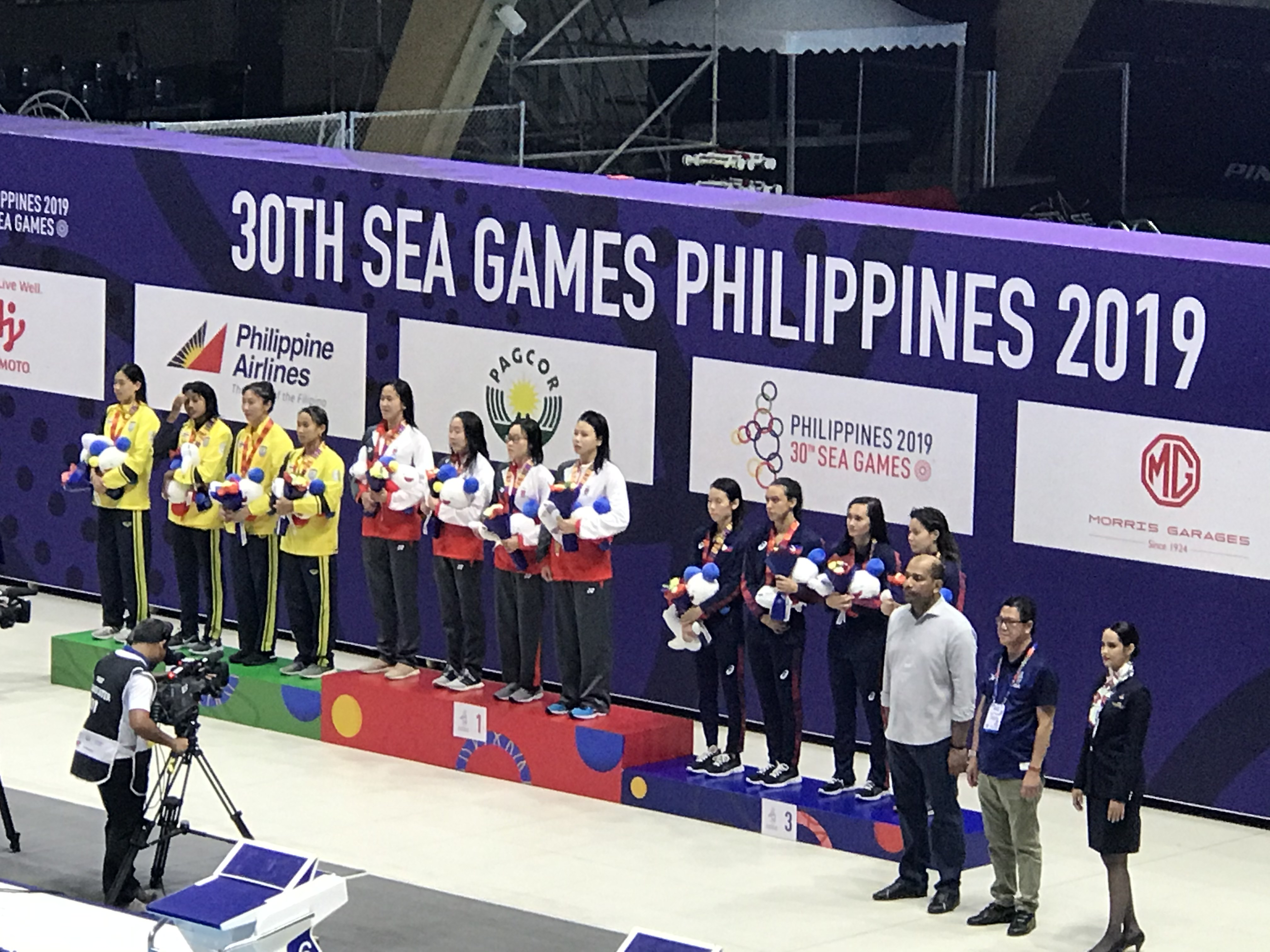
Medal ceremony for the women's 4×200 m freestyle relay.

The 2019 Southeast Asian Games, officially known as the 30th Southeast Asian Games, were held in the Philippines, from 30 November 2019 to 11 December 2019.

With 56 sports and 530 events, a total of 1,784 medals were awarded.

== Archery ==
=== Recurve ===
Event	Gold	Silver	Bronze
Men's individual	Hendra Purnama; Indonesia	Htike Lin Oo; Myanmar	Riau Ega Agatha; Indonesia
Women's individual	Lộc Thị Đào; Vietnam	Pyae Sone Hnin; Myanmar	Thidar Nwe; Myanmar
Men's team	Indonesia; Riau Ega Agatha; Hendra Purnama; Arif Dwi Pangestu	Malaysia; Khairul Anuar Mohamad; Haziq Kamaruddin; Zarif Syahiir Zolkepeli	Thailand; Witthaya Thamwong; Denchai Thepna; Tanapat Pathairat
Women's team	Vietnam; Lộc Thị Đào; Đỗ Thị Ánh Nguyệt; Nguyen Thi Phuong	Myanmar; Thidar Nwe; Pyae Sone Hnin; Yamin Thu	Indonesia; Diananda Choirunisa; Linda Lestari; Titik Kusumawardani
Mixed team	Vietnam; Nguyễn Hoàng Phi Vũ; Lộc Thị Đào	Indonesia; Riau Ega Agatha; Diananda Choirunisa	Malaysia; Khairul Anuar Mohamad; Nur Afisa Abdul Halil

=== Compound ===
Event	Gold	Silver	Bronze
Men's individual	Nitiphum Chatachot; Thailand	Sirapop Chainak; Thailand	Yoke Rizaldi Akbar; Indonesia
Women's individual	Kanoknapus Kaewchomphu; Thailand	Fatin Nurfatehah Mat Salleh; Malaysia	Hlang Su Su; Myanmar
Men's team	Malaysia; Mohd Juwaidi Mazuki; Zulfadhli Ruslan; Khambeswaran Mohanaraja	Vietnam; Nguyễn Văn Đầy; Thạch Phi Hùng; Nguyễn Tiến Cương	Thailand; Nitiphum Chatachot; Sirapop Chainak; Dhansarit Itsarangkun Na Ayutthaya
Women's team	Thailand; Kanyavee Maneesombatkul; Kanoknapus Kaewchomphu; Kodchaporn Pratumsuwan	Indonesia; Triya Resky Andriyani; Yurike Nina Bonita Pereira; Sri Ranti	Vietnam; Châu Kiều Oanh; Lê Phương Thảo; Nguyễn Tường Vi
Mixed team	Philippines; Paul Marton de la Cruz; Rachelle Anne de la Cruz	Vietnam; Nguyễn Văn Đầy; Châu Kiều Oanh	Indonesia; Prima Wisnu Wardhana; Sri Ranti

== Arnis ==
=== Men ===
==== Livestick ====
Event	Gold	Silver	Bronze
Bantamweight	Dexler Bolambao; Philippines	Paing Soc; Myanmar	Deb Nget; Cambodia
Bantamweight	Dexler Bolambao; Philippines	Paing Soc; Myanmar	Nguyễn Ngọc Đạt; Vietnam
Featherweight	Niño Mark Talledo; Philippines	Vũ Văn Kiên; Vietnam	Sok Chhun; Cambodia
Featherweight	Niño Mark Talledo; Philippines	Vũ Văn Kiên; Vietnam	Paing Win Thet; Myanmar
Lightweight	Villardo Cunamay; Philippines	Yong Mengly; Cambodia	Thet Naing Oo; Myanmar
Lightweight	Villardo Cunamay; Philippines	Yong Mengly; Cambodia	Vũ Đức Hùng; Vietnam
Welterweight	Mike Bañares; Philippines	Phú Thái Việt; Vietnam	Moeun Bunly; Cambodia
Welterweight	Mike Bañares; Philippines	Phú Thái Việt; Vietnam	Van Lian Khawl; Myanmar

==== Padded stick ====
Event	Gold	Silver	Bronze
Bantamweight	Jesper Huquire; Philippines	Văn Công Quốc; Vietnam	Deb Nget; Cambodia
Bantamweight	Jesper Huquire; Philippines	Văn Công Quốc; Vietnam	Nay Linn Oo; Myanmar
Featherweight	Elmer Manlapas; Philippines	Nguyễn Đức Trí; Vietnam	Sok Chhun; Cambodia
Featherweight	Elmer Manlapas; Philippines	Nguyễn Đức Trí; Vietnam	Ko Tin; Myanmar
Lightweight	Yong Mengly; Cambodia	Billy Joey Valenzuela; Philippines	Aung Khaing Linn; Myanmar
Lightweight	Yong Mengly; Cambodia	Billy Joey Valenzuela; Philippines	Vũ Đức Hùng; Vietnam
Welterweight	Carloyd Tejada; Philippines	Vương Thanh Tùng; Vietnam	Moeun Bunly; Cambodia
Welterweight	Carloyd Tejada; Philippines	Vương Thanh Tùng; Vietnam	Kyaw Thurain Tun; Myanmar

==== Anyo ====
Event	Gold	Silver	Bronze
Non-traditional Open Weapon	Crisamuel Delfin; Philippines	Ngô Văn Huỳnh; Vietnam	Chhem Sila; Cambodia
Non-traditional Open Weapon	Crisamuel Delfin; Philippines	Ngô Văn Huỳnh; Vietnam	Yar Zar Tun; Myanmar
Traditional Open Weapon	Đỗ Đức Trí; Vietnam	Mark David Puzon; Philippines	Chhem Sila; Cambodia
Traditional Open Weapon	Đỗ Đức Trí; Vietnam	Mark David Puzon; Philippines	Be Be Kyaw Aung; Myanmar

=== Women ===
==== Livestick ====
Event	Gold	Silver	Bronze
Bantamweight	Jezebel Morcillo; Philippines	Nguyễn Thị Hương; Vietnam	Khiev Chendaroth; Cambodia
Bantamweight	Jezebel Morcillo; Philippines	Nguyễn Thị Hương; Vietnam	Thandar Khing; Myanmar
Featherweight	Vũ Thị Thanh Bình; Vietnam	Jude Oliver Rodriguez; Philippines	Yuos Sanchana; Cambodia
Featherweight	Vũ Thị Thanh Bình; Vietnam	Jude Oliver Rodriguez; Philippines	Hla Nwe Aye; Myanmar
Lightweight	Đào Thị Hồng Nhung; Vietnam	Si Veannsonita; Cambodia	Moe Moe Aye; Myanmar
Lightweight	Đào Thị Hồng Nhung; Vietnam	Si Veannsonita; Cambodia	Eza Rai Yalong; Philippines
Welterweight	Nguyễn Thị Cẩm Nhi; Vietnam	Thet Wai Oo; Myanmar	Bo Chanthy; Cambodia
Welterweight	Nguyễn Thị Cẩm Nhi; Vietnam	Thet Wai Oo; Myanmar	Erlin Mae Busacay; Philippines

==== Padded stick ====
Event	Gold	Silver	Bronze
Bantamweight	Sheena Del Monte; Philippines	Nguyễn Thị Hương; Vietnam	Khiev Chendaroth; Cambodia
Bantamweight	Sheena Del Monte; Philippines	Nguyễn Thị Hương; Vietnam	Wut Yae Cho; Myanmar
Featherweight	Jedah Mae Soriano; Philippines	Maw Maw Oo; Myanmar	Yuos Sanchana; Cambodia
Featherweight	Jedah Mae Soriano; Philippines	Maw Maw Oo; Myanmar	Đoàn Thị Nhuần; Vietnam
Lightweight	Ross Ashley Monville; Philippines	Moe Moe Aye; Myanmar	Si Veannsonita; Cambodia
Lightweight	Ross Ashley Monville; Philippines	Moe Moe Aye; Myanmar	Lê Thị Vân Anh; Vietnam
Welterweight	Abegail Abad; Philippines	Nguyễn Thị Cúc; Vietnam	Bo Chanthy; Cambodia
Welterweight	Abegail Abad; Philippines	Nguyễn Thị Cúc; Vietnam	L Sheilar Min Naing; Myanmar

==== Anyo ====
Event	Gold	Silver	Bronze
Non-traditional Open Weapon	Mary Allin Aldeguer; Philippines	Triệu Thị Hoài; Vietnam	Eng Sou Mala; Cambodia
Non-traditional Open Weapon	Mary Allin Aldeguer; Philippines	Triệu Thị Hoài; Vietnam	L Sheilar Min Naing; Myanmar
Traditional Open Weapon	Eian Dray Phoo; Myanmar	Ryssa Jezzel Sanchez; Philippines	Eng Sou Mala; Cambodia
Traditional Open Weapon	Eian Dray Phoo; Myanmar	Ryssa Jezzel Sanchez; Philippines	Nguyễn Phương Linh; Vietnam

== Athletics ==
=== Men's events ===
Key
GR	Southeast Asian Games record	NR	National record

Event	Gold		Silver		Bronze	
100 m	Muhammad Haiqal Hanafi; Malaysia	10.35	Ruttanapon Sowan; Thailand	10.49	Bandit Chuangchai; Thailand	10.52
200 m	Chayut Khongprasit; Thailand	20.71	Siripol Punpa; Thailand	20.78	Russel Alexander Nasir Taib; Malaysia	21.11
400 m	Trần Nhật Hoàng; Vietnam	46.56	Trần Đình Sơn; Vietnam	46.68	Phitchaya Sunthonthuam; Thailand	46.98
800 m	Dương Văn Thái; Vietnam	1:49.91	Carter Lilly; Philippines	1:50.17	Royson Vincent; Malaysia	1:50.68
1500 m	Dương Văn Thái; Vietnam	4:06.63	Mariano Masano; Philippines	4:08.27	Yothin Yaprajan; Thailand	4:08.90
5000 m	Kieran Tuntivate; Thailand	14:31.15	Nguyễn Văn Lai; Vietnam	14:32.42	Sonny Wagdos; Philippines	14:34.73
10000 m	Kieran Tuntivate; Thailand	30:19.28	Agus Prayogo; Indonesia	30:22.13	Nguyễn Văn Lai; Vietnam	30:29.73
110 m hurdles	Clinton Bautista; Philippines	13.97	Rayzam Shah Wan Sofian; Malaysia	13.97	Anousone Xaysa; Laos	13.99
400 m hurdles	Eric Cray; Philippines	50.21	Halomoan Edwin Binsar; Indonesia	50.81	Quách Công Lịch; Vietnam	51.60
3000 m steeplechase	Đỗ Quốc Luật; Vietnam	9:04.50	Nguyễn Trung Cường; Vietnam	9:04.54	Atjong Tio Purwanto; Indonesia	9:10.02
4 × 100 m relay	Thailand; Ruttanapon Sowan; Bandit Chuangchai; Jirapong Meenapra; Siripol Punpa	39.27	Malaysia; Nixson Kennedy; Muhammad Haiqal Hanafi; Khairul Hafiz Jantan; Russel Alexander Nasir Taib	39.78	Philippines; Anfernee Lopena; Clinton Bautista; Francis Medina; Eric Cray	40.04
4 × 400 m relay	Vietnam; Quách Công Lịch; Lương Văn Thao; Trần Đình Sơn; Trần Nhật Hoàng	3:08.07	Thailand; Chamsri Apisit; Kongkraphan Nattapong; Sripha Thipthanet; Sunthonthuam Phitchya	3:08.20	Philippines; Edgardo Alejan Jr. Micheal Carlo Del Prado; Frederick Ramirez; Joyme Sequita	3:08.63
Marathon	Agus Prayogo; Indonesia	2:26:48	Samchai Namkhey; Thailand	2:27:18	Muhaizar Mohamad; Malaysia	2:33:08
20 km walk	Hendro Yap; Indonesia	1:31:20	Võ Xuân Vĩnh; Vietnam	1:31:38	Mine Nyi Nyi Moe; Myanmar	1:33:25
High jump	Lee Hup Wei; Malaysia	2.21 m	Nauraj Singh Randhawa; Malaysia	2.21 m	Tawan Kaeodam; Thailand	2.15 m
Pole vault	Ernest Obiena; Philippines	5.45 m GR	Porranot Purahong; Thailand	5.20 m	Iskandar Alwi; Malaysia	5.00 m
Long jump	Sapwaturrahman; Indonesia	8.03 m GR	Andre Anura; Malaysia	8.02 m	Sutthisak Singkhon; Thailand	7.89 m
Triple jump	Hakimi Ismail; Malaysia	16.68 m	Mark Harry Diones; Philippines	16.42 m	Sapwaturrahman; Indonesia	16.21 m
Shot put	William Morrison III; Philippines	18.38 m	Muhammad Ziyad Zolkefli; Malaysia	17.03 m	Promrob Juntima; Thailand	16.40 m
Discus throw	Irfan Shamsuddin; Malaysia	57.29 m	William Morrison III; Philippines	51.38 m	Narong Benjaroon; Thailand	51.29 m
Hammer throw	Kittipong Boonmawan; Thailand	67.56 m GR	Jackie Siew; Malaysia	63.83 m	Ye Htet Aung; Myanmar	58.88 m
Javelin throw	Melvin Calano; Philippines	72.86 m	Abdul Hafiz; Indonesia	71.00 m	Nguyễn Hoài Văn; Vietnam	70.88 m
Decathlon	Aries Toledo; Philippines	7033 pts.	Bùi Văn Sự; Vietnam	6911 pts.	Janry Ubas; Philippines	6769 pts.

=== Women's events ===
Event	Gold		Silver		Bronze	
100 m	Lê Tú Chinh; Vietnam	11.54	Kristina Knott; Philippines	11.55	Veronica Shanti Pereira; Singapore	11.66
200 m	Kristina Knott; Philippines	23.01 GR	Lê Tú Chinh; Vietnam	23.45	Veronica Shanti Pereira; Singapore	23.77
400 m	Nguyễn Thị Huyền; Vietnam	52.80	Chinenye Onuorah; Thailand	53.81	Quách Thị Lan; Vietnam	53.95
800 m	Đinh Thị Bích; Vietnam	2:07.16	Khuất Phương Anh; Vietnam	2:08.24	Agustina Mardika Manik; Indonesia	2:09.61
1500 m	Nguyễn Thị Oanh; Vietnam	4:17.31	Agustina Mardika Manik; Indonesia	4:22.60	Khuất Phương Anh; Vietnam	4:23.47
5000 m	Nguyễn Thị Oanh; Vietnam	16:45.98	Phạm Thị Huệ; Vietnam	16:52.35	Joida Gagnao; Philippines	17:52.16
10000 m	Phạm Thị Huệ; Vietnam	36:23.24	Phạm Thị Hồng Lệ; Vietnam	36:32.24	Odekta Elvina Naibaho; Indonesia	36:42.28
100 m hurdles	Emilia Nova; Indonesia	13.61	Trần Thị Yến Hoa; Vietnam	13.75	Nur Izlyn Zaini; Singapore	13.92
400 m hurdles	Nguyễn Thị Huyền; Vietnam	56.90	Quach Thi Lan; Vietnam	57.39	Robyn Lauren Brown; Philippines	59.08
3000 m steeplechase	Nguyễn Thị Oanh; Vietnam	10:00.02 GR	Joida Gagnao; Philippines	10:59.91	Pretty Sihite; Indonesia	11:05.93
4 × 100 m relay	Thailand; Supawan Thipat; Uma Chatta-on; Kwanrutai Pakdee; Tassaporn Wannakit	44.38	Philippines; Kristina Knott; Kayla Richardson; Kyla Richardson; Zion Nelson	44.57	Vietnam; Hà Thị Thu; Lê Tú Chinh; Lê Thị Mộng Tuyền; Trần Thị Yến Hoa	45.17
4 × 400 m relay	Vietnam; Nguyễn Thị Oanh; Quách Thị Lan; Hoàng Thị Ngọc; Nguyễn Thị Hằng	3:34.64	Thailand; Sukanya Janchaona; Supanich Poolkerd; Arisa Weruwanarak; Chinenye Onuorah	3:39.78	Philippines; Eloiza Luzon; Jessel Lumapas; Maureen Schrijvers; Robyn Brown	3:43.41
Marathon	Christine Hallasgo; Philippines	2:56:56	Mary Joy Tabal; Philippines	2:58:49	Phạm Thị Hồng Lệ; Vietnam	3:02:52
10 km walk	Phạm Thị Thu Trang; Vietnam	52:59.45	Than Than Soe; Myanmar	53:29.89	Elena Goh Ling Yin; Malaysia	53:38.71
High jump	Yap Sean Yee; Malaysia	1.81 m	shared gold		Phạm Thị Diễm; Vietnam	1.78 m
High jump	Wanida Boonwan; Thailand	1.81 m	shared gold		Phạm Thị Diễm; Vietnam	1.78 m
Pole vault	Natalie Uy; Philippines	4.25 m GR	Chayanisa Chomchuendee; Thailand	4.10 m	Chonthicha Khabut; Thailand	4.00 m
Long jump	Maria Natalia Londa; Indonesia	6.47 m	Parinya Chuaimaroeng; Thailand	6.23 m	Vũ Thị Mộng Mơ; Vietnam	6.16 m
Triple jump	Parinya Chuaimaroeng; Thailand	13.75 m	Maria Natalia Londa; Indonesia	13.60 m	Vũ Thị Mến; Vietnam	13.55 m
Shot put	Arrerat Intadis; Thailand	15.80 m	Eki Febri Ekawati; Indonesia	15.08 m	Athima Saowaphaiboon; Thailand	13.36 m
Discus throw	Subenrat Insaeng; Thailand	60.33 m GR	Choo Kang Ni; Malaysia	47.02 m	Queenie Ting Kung Ni; Malaysia	45.28 m
Hammer throw	Mingkamon Koomphon; Thailand	55.99 m	Grace Wong; Malaysia	55.82 m	Panwat Gimsrang; Thailand	55.64 m
Javelin throw	Natta Nachan; Thailand	55.66 m	Lò Thị Hoàng; Vietnam	53.77 m	Jariya Wichaidit; Thailand	51.80 m
Heptathlon	Sarah Dequinan; Philippines	5101 pts.	Norliyana Kamaruddin; Malaysia	4906 pts.	Sunisa Khotseemueang; Thailand	4730 pts.

=== Mixed ===
Event	Gold		Silver		Bronze	
4 × 100 m relay	Philippines; Eloiza Luzon; Anfernee Lopena; Kristina Knott; Eric Cray	41.67	Thailand; Tassaporn Wannakit; Chayut Khongprasit; Kwanrutai Pakdee; Nutthapong Veeravongratanasiri	41.99	Malaysia; Azreen Nabila Alias; Jonathan Nyepa; Zaidatul Husniah Zulkifli; Nixson Kennedy	42.40
4 × 400 m relay	Vietnam; Nguyễn Thị Hằng; Trần Nhật Hoàng; Quách Thị Lan; Trần Đình Sơn	3:19.50	Thailand; Pratchaya Prapas; Chinenye Onuorah; Arisa Weruwanarak; Pipatporn Paungpi	3:26.09	Philippines; Raymond Alferos; Robyn Brown; Maureen Schrijvers; Edgardo Alejan Jr.	3:26.95

== Badminton ==
Event	Gold	Silver	Bronze
Men's singles	Lee Zii Jia; Malaysia	Loh Kean Yew; Singapore	Kantaphon Wangcharoen; Thailand
Men's singles	Lee Zii Jia; Malaysia	Loh Kean Yew; Singapore	Sitthikom Thammasin; Thailand
Women's singles	Kisona Selvaduray; Malaysia	Ruselli Hartawan; Indonesia	Pornpawee Chochuwong; Thailand
Women's singles	Kisona Selvaduray; Malaysia	Ruselli Hartawan; Indonesia	Nitchaon Jindapol; Thailand
Men's doubles	Malaysia; Aaron Chia; Soh Wooi Yik	Thailand; Bodin Isara; Maneepong Jongjit	Malaysia; Ong Yew Sin; Teo Ee Yi
Men's doubles	Malaysia; Aaron Chia; Soh Wooi Yik	Thailand; Bodin Isara; Maneepong Jongjit	Indonesia; Wahyu Nayaka; Ade Yusuf Santoso
Women's doubles	Indonesia; Greysia Polii; Apriyani Rahayu	Thailand; Chayanit Chaladchalam; Phataimas Muenwong	Malaysia; Vivian Hoo Kah Mun; Yap Cheng Wen
Women's doubles	Indonesia; Greysia Polii; Apriyani Rahayu	Thailand; Chayanit Chaladchalam; Phataimas Muenwong	Malaysia; Chow Mei Kuan; Lee Meng Yean
Mixed doubles	Indonesia; Praveen Jordan; Melati Daeva Oktavianti	Malaysia; Goh Soon Huat; Shevon Jemie Lai	Malaysia; Tan Kian Meng; Lai Pei Jing
Mixed doubles	Indonesia; Praveen Jordan; Melati Daeva Oktavianti	Malaysia; Goh Soon Huat; Shevon Jemie Lai	Indonesia; Rinov Rivaldy; Pitha Haningtyas Mentari
Men's team	Indonesia; Jonatan Christie; Anthony Sinisuka Ginting; Shesar Hiren Rhustavito; Firman Abdul Kholik; Fajar Alfian; Muhammad Rian Ardianto; Wahyu Nayaka; Ade Yusuf Santoso; Praveen Jordan; Rinov Rivaldy	Malaysia; Lee Zii Jia; Soong Joo Ven; Aidil Sholeh Ali Sadikin; Lim Chong King; Aaron Chia; Soh Wooi Yik; Ong Yew Sin; Teo Ee Yi; Goh Soon Huat; Tan Kian Meng	Singapore; Loh Kean Yew; Joel Koh Jia Wei; Teh Jia Heng; Muhammad Elaf Wei Tan; Terry Hee Yong Kai; Loh Kean Hean; Danny Bawa Chrisnanta; Andy Kwek Jun Liang; Abel Tan Wen Xing; Toh Han Zhuo
Men's team	Indonesia; Jonatan Christie; Anthony Sinisuka Ginting; Shesar Hiren Rhustavito; Firman Abdul Kholik; Fajar Alfian; Muhammad Rian Ardianto; Wahyu Nayaka; Ade Yusuf Santoso; Praveen Jordan; Rinov Rivaldy	Malaysia; Lee Zii Jia; Soong Joo Ven; Aidil Sholeh Ali Sadikin; Lim Chong King; Aaron Chia; Soh Wooi Yik; Ong Yew Sin; Teo Ee Yi; Goh Soon Huat; Tan Kian Meng	Thailand; Kantaphon Wangcharoen; Sitthikom Thammasin; Khosit Phetpradab; Suppanyu Avihingsanon; Bodin Isara; Maneepong Jongjit; Kittisak Namdash; Kittinupong Kedren; Nipitphon Phuangphuapet
Women's team	Thailand; Ratchanok Intanon; Busanan Ongbamrungphan; Pornpawee Chochuwong; Nitchaon Jindapol; Jongkolphan Kititharakul; Rawinda Prajongjai; Puttita Supajirakul; Chayanit Chaladchalam; Phataimas Muenwong; Savitree Amitrapai	Indonesia; Gregoria Mariska Tunjung; Fitriani; Ruselli Hartawan; Greysia Polii; Apriani Rahayu; Ni Ketut Mahadewi Istarani; Siti Fadia Silva Ramadhanti; Ribka Sugiarto; Melati Daeva Oktavianti; Pitha Haningtyas Mentari	Malaysia; Soniia Cheah Su Ya; Kisona Selvaduray; Lee Ying Ying; Eoon Qi Xuan; Chow Mei Kuan; Lee Meng Yean; Vivian Hoo Kah Mun; Yap Cheng Wen; Lai Pei Jing; Shevon Jemie Lai
Women's team	Thailand; Ratchanok Intanon; Busanan Ongbamrungphan; Pornpawee Chochuwong; Nitchaon Jindapol; Jongkolphan Kititharakul; Rawinda Prajongjai; Puttita Supajirakul; Chayanit Chaladchalam; Phataimas Muenwong; Savitree Amitrapai	Indonesia; Gregoria Mariska Tunjung; Fitriani; Ruselli Hartawan; Greysia Polii; Apriani Rahayu; Ni Ketut Mahadewi Istarani; Siti Fadia Silva Ramadhanti; Ribka Sugiarto; Melati Daeva Oktavianti; Pitha Haningtyas Mentari	Singapore; Yeo Jia Min; Jaslyn Hooi Yue Yann; Grace Chua Hui Zhen; Sito Jia Rong; Jin Yujia; Nur Insyirah Khan; Shinta Mulia Sari; Crystal Wong; Tan Wei Han

== Baseball ==
Event	Gold	Silver	Bronze
Men	Philippines (PHI); Dino Emiglio Altomonte; Adriane Ros Bernardo; Erwin Bosito; Clarence Lyle Caasalan; Bryan Victrix Castillo; Alfredo de Guzman III; Junmar Diarao; Vladimir Eguia; Ignacio Luis Escano; Francis Michael Gesmundo; Arvin Maynard Herrera; Jarus Inobio; Romeo Jasmin Jr. Ferdinand Liguayan Jr. Juan Diego Lozano; Juan Alvaro Macasaet; Juan Paolo Macasaet; Mark Steven Manaig; Jennald Pareja; Jonash Ponce; Jon Jon Robles; Miguel Jose Salud; Kyle Rodrigo Villafaña Jr. Jerome Yenson	Thailand (THA); Setthawut Bucha; Nirawit Bunnam; John Daniel Daru; Joseph Matthew Daru; Oliver Graeme Dunn; Pipat Hongsrisuwan; Sarawut Jandang; Kamolphan Kanjanavisut; Suppakorn Lin; Naruephol Muangkasem; Siraphop Nadee; Netithorn Nualla-ong; Travis Tanthai Owens; Sakai Phraechai; Sanyalak Pipatpinyo; Ryan Richard Rodgers; Wissaroot Sihamat; Sek Sitthikaew; Chayaphat Suanthong; Anukul Sudsawad; Phanuwat Sukmuang; Nirun Supasiritananon; Narin Turapa; Phoomwut Wutthikorn	Indonesia (INA); Aditya Muflih Mahmud; Akbar Aminudin; Alexander Aribowo; Andersen Lim; Andika Arlistianto; Anhar Rachman; Bachtiar Sanjaya; Diva Fabil; Faldy Zulfikar; Gunawan Khallista; Hadi Nur Muhammad; Hakeem Rahniady Putra Adi Yatim; Hasruddin; Jericho Junior; Jerry Rachman; Lutfi Shurianto; Nanda Dwi Saputra; Nazrey Lazuardi; Ranjani; Rawafi Yaputra Yanto Rozali; Ray Santoso; Rizdki Aditya; Rizki Ramadhan; Zidney Fahmidyan

== Basketball ==
Event	Gold	Silver	Bronze
Men's tournament	Philippines (PHI); Japeth Paul Aguilar; June Mar Fajardo; Marcio Lassiter; Vic Manuel; Stanley Pringle; Kiefer Isaac Ravena; Jeth Troy Rosario; Christopher Ross; Gregory William Slaughter; Christian Karl Standhardinger; Lewis Alfred Tenorio; Matthew Andrew Wright	Thailand (THA); Chitchai Ananti; Darongpan Apiromvilaichai; Teerawat Chanthacon; Chatpol Chungyampin; Nakorn Jaisanuk; Chanatip Jakrawan; Patiphan Klahan; Tyler Lamb; Anucha Langsui; Attapong Leelapipatkul; Nattakarn Muangboon; Wattana Suttisin	Vietnam (VIE); Christopher William Dierker; Thanh Sang Dinh; Thanh Tam Dinh; Minh An Du; The Hien Hoang; Hieu Thanh Le; Horace Phuc Tam Nguyen; Huynh Phu Vinh Nguyen; Tuan Tu Stefan Nguyen; Dang Khoa Tran; Kim Ban Vo; Duong Justin Young
Women's tournament	Philippines (PHI); Jack Danielle Animam; Afril Bernardino; France Mae Cabinbin; Ana Alicia Katrina Castillo; Clare Castro; Eunique Chan; Kelly Casey Hayes; Danica Therese Jose; Ria Joy Nabalan; Janine Pontejos; Nathalia Prado; Marrize Andrea Tongco	Thailand (THA); Tiffany Christine Bias; Nutchavarin Buapa; Atchara Kaichaiyapoom; Supira Klunbut; Supavadee Kunchuan; Thidaporn Maihom; Kloyjai Phetsaenkha; Suree Phromrat; Wantanee Sangmanee; Pimchosita Supyen; Rattiyakorn Udomsuk; Penphan Yothanan	Indonesia (INA); Yuni Anggraeni; Clarita Antonio; Wulan Ayuningrum; Kadek Pratita Citta Dewi; Lea Elvensia Kahol; Husna Aulia Latifah; Dora Lovita; Agustin Elya Gradita Retong; Gabriel Sophia; Henny Sutjiono; Annisa Widyarni; Adelaide Callista Wongsohardjo
Men's 3x3 tournament	Philippines (PHI); Christopher Elijah Newsome; Christian Jaymar Perez; Jason Andre Perkins; Moala Tautuaa, Jr.	Indonesia (INA); Muhammad Sandy Ibrahim Aziz; Rivaldo Tandra Pangesthio; Oki Wira Sanjaya; Surliyadin	Vietnam (VIE); Đinh Thanh Tâm; Dương Vĩnh Luân; Đặng Quý Kiệt; Trần Đăng Khoa
Women's 3x3 tournament	Philippines (PHI); Jack Danielle Animam; Afril Bernardino; Clare Castro; Janine Pontejos	Thailand (THA); Naruemol Banmoo; Warunee Kitraksa; Kanokwan Prajuapsook; Amphawa Thuamon	Malaysia (MAS); Hui Pin Pang; Chia Qian Tai; Eugene Ting Chiau Teng; Fook Yee Yap

== Beach handball ==
Event	Gold	Silver	Bronze
Men	Vietnam; Hoàng Văn Tiến; Huỳnh Tấn Vỹ; Huỳnh Nam Tiến; Kim Xuân Tiến; La Văn Lớn; Lê Văn Bình; Nguyễn Chí Tâm; Nguyễn Quang Tú; Văn Quang Tùng; Võ Vương Trọng	Thailand; Open Kannarong; Bulakorn Kongka; Nutdanai Ruksawong; Kittipong Ruksawong; Chokchai Saitaphap; Chaiwat Sinsuwan; Puwanart Srichai; Passakorn Srinamkham; Chainarong Srisong; Surasak Waenwiset	Philippines; Van Jacob Baccay; Mark Dubouzet; Andrew Michael Harris; Manuel Lasangue Jr. Jamael Pangandaman; John Michael Pasco; Rey Joshua Tabuzo; Josef Valdez; Dhane Varela; Daryoush Zandi

== Billiards and snooker ==
=== Men ===
Event	Gold	Silver	Bronze
English billiard singles	Peter Gilchrist; Singapore	Nay Thway Oo; Myanmar	Yuttapop Pakpoj; Thailand
English billiard singles	Peter Gilchrist; Singapore	Nay Thway Oo; Myanmar	Trần Lê Anh Tuấn; Vietnam
9-ball pool singles	Phone Myint Kyaw; Myanmar	Đỗ Thế Kiên; Vietnam	Aloysius Yapp; Singapore
9-ball pool singles	Phone Myint Kyaw; Myanmar	Đỗ Thế Kiên; Vietnam	Toh Lian Han; Singapore
9-ball pool doubles	Myanmar; Phone Myint Kyaw; Aung Moe Thu	Singapore; Toh Lian Han; Aloysius Yapp	Philippines; Jeffrey Ignacio; Warren Kiamco
9-ball pool doubles	Myanmar; Phone Myint Kyaw; Aung Moe Thu	Singapore; Toh Lian Han; Aloysius Yapp	Philippines; Carlo Biado; Johann Chua
10-ball pool singles	Dennis Orcollo; Philippines	Đỗ Thế Kiên; Vietnam	Ismail Kadir; Indonesia
10-ball pool singles	Dennis Orcollo; Philippines	Đỗ Thế Kiên; Vietnam	Aloysius Yapp; Singapore
1-cushion carom	Ngô Đình Nại; Vietnam	Phạm Cảnh Phúc; Vietnam	Efren Reyes; Philippines
1-cushion carom	Ngô Đình Nại; Vietnam	Phạm Cảnh Phúc; Vietnam	Francisco Dela Cruz; Philippines
Snooker singles	Kritsanut Lertsattayathorn; Thailand	Moh Keen Hoo; Malaysia	Jefrey Roda; Philippines
Snooker singles	Kritsanut Lertsattayathorn; Thailand	Moh Keen Hoo; Malaysia	Siththideth Sakbieng; Laos
Snooker doubles	Malaysia; Moh Keen Hoo; Kok Leong Lim	Philippines; Alvin Barbero; Jefrey Roda	Singapore; Kingsley Ang; Marvin Lim
Snooker doubles	Malaysia; Moh Keen Hoo; Kok Leong Lim	Philippines; Alvin Barbero; Jefrey Roda	Myanmar; Ko Htet; Thet Min Lin

=== Women ===
Event	Gold	Silver	Bronze
9-ball pool singles	Rubilen Amit; Philippines	Chezka Centeno; Philippines	Jessica Tan; Singapore
9-ball pool singles	Rubilen Amit; Philippines	Chezka Centeno; Philippines	Vutthiphan Kongkaket; Thailand
9-ball pool doubles	Philippines; Chezka Centeno; Rubilen Amit	Indonesia; Fathrah Masum; Nony Krystianti Andilah	Singapore; Jessica Tan; Suvene Ng
9-ball pool doubles	Philippines; Chezka Centeno; Rubilen Amit	Indonesia; Fathrah Masum; Nony Krystianti Andilah	Indonesia; Angeline Magdalena Ticoalu; Silviana Lu
10-ball pool singles	Chezka Centeno; Philippines	Rubilen Amit; Philippines	A Mi Aung; Myanmar
10-ball pool singles	Chezka Centeno; Philippines	Rubilen Amit; Philippines	Thandar Maung; Myanmar

== Bowling ==
=== Men ===
Event	Gold	Silver	Bronze
Singles	Tan Chye Chern; Malaysia	Annop Arromsaranon; Thailand	Cheah Ray Han; Singapore
Doubles	Indonesia; Billy Muhammad Islam; Hardy Rachmadian	Thailand; Atchariya Cheng; Surasak Manuwong	Malaysia; Tun Hakim; Rafiq Ismail
Team of 4	Malaysia; Rafiq Ismail; Tun Hakim; Tan Chye Chern; Ahmad Muaz	Philippines; Kenneth Chua; Patrick Nuqui; Frederick Ong; Merwin Tan	Thailand; Atchariya Cheng; Surasak Manuwong; Annop Arromsaranon; Yannaphon Larpapharat
Masters	Billy Muhammad Islam; Indonesia	Ryan Leonard Lalisang; Indonesia	Muhd Jaris Goh; Singapore

=== Women ===
Event	Gold	Silver	Bronze
Singles	New Hui Fen; Singapore	Tannya Roumimper; Indonesia	Shayna Ng; Singapore
Doubles	Indonesia; Sharon Limansantoso; Tannya Roumimper	Singapore; New Hui Fen; Shayna Ng	Malaysia; Jane Sin; Esther Cheah
Team of 4	Singapore; Daphne Tan; New Hui Fen; Shayna Ng; Cherie Tan	Malaysia; Esther Cheah; Jane Sin; Shalin Zulkifli; Siti Safiyah	Philippines; Alexis Sy; Liza Del Rosario; Lara Posadas-Wong; Bea Hernandez
Masters	New Hui Fen; Singapore	Siti Safiyah; Malaysia	Shayna Ng; Singapore

=== Mixed ===
Event	Gold	Silver	Bronze
Doubles	Indonesia; Ryan Leonard Lalisang; Aldila Indryati	Malaysia; Ahmad Muaz; Siti Safiyah	Indonesia; Hardy Rachmadian; Sharon Limansantoso

== Boxing ==
=== Men ===
Event	Gold	Silver	Bronze
Light flyweight (46–49 kg)	Carlo Paalam; Philippines	Kornelis Kwangu Langu; Indonesia	Muhamad Fuad Redzuan; Malaysia
Light flyweight (46–49 kg)	Carlo Paalam; Philippines	Kornelis Kwangu Langu; Indonesia	Sao Rangsey; Cambodia
Flyweight (52 kg)	Rogen Ladon; Philippines	Ammarit Yaodam; Thailand	Jose Barreto Quintas da Silva; Timor-Leste
Flyweight (52 kg)	Rogen Ladon; Philippines	Ammarit Yaodam; Thailand	Mohamed Hanurdeen Hamid; Singapore
Bantamweight (56 kg)	Chatchai-decha Butdee; Thailand	Nguyễn Văn Dương; Vietnam	Ian Bautista; Philippines
Bantamweight (56 kg)	Chatchai-decha Butdee; Thailand	Nguyễn Văn Dương; Vietnam	Naing Latt; Myanmar
Lightweight (60 kg)	Charly Suarez; Philippines	Khunatip Pidnuch; Thailand	Vũ Thành Đạt; Vietnam
Lightweight (60 kg)	Charly Suarez; Philippines	Khunatip Pidnuch; Thailand	Farrand Papendang; Indonesia
Light welterweight (64 kg)	James Palicte; Philippines	Nguyễn Văn Hải; Vietnam	Yon Daroth; Cambodia
Light welterweight (64 kg)	James Palicte; Philippines	Nguyễn Văn Hải; Vietnam	Atichai Phoemsap; Thailand
Welterweight (69 kg)	Wuttichai Masuk; Thailand	Marjon Piañar; Philippines	Grece Savon Simangunsong; Indonesia
Middleweight (75 kg)	Eumir Marcial; Philippines	Nguyễn Mạnh Cường; Vietnam	Mohd Aswan Che Azmi; Malaysia
Middleweight (75 kg)	Eumir Marcial; Philippines	Nguyễn Mạnh Cường; Vietnam	Siv Songmeng; Cambodia
Light heavyweight (81 kg)	Anavat Thongkrathok; Thailand	Trương Đình Hoàng; Vietnam	Khir Akyazlan Azmi; Malaysia
Light heavyweight (81 kg)	Anavat Thongkrathok; Thailand	Trương Đình Hoàng; Vietnam	Frederico Soares Sarmento; Timor-Leste

=== Women ===
Event	Gold	Silver	Bronze
Light flyweight (48 kg)	Josie Gabuco; Philippines	Endang; Indonesia	Aye Nyein Htoo; Myanmar
Light flyweight (48 kg)	Josie Gabuco; Philippines	Endang; Indonesia	Trịnh Thị Diễm Kiều; Vietnam
Flyweight (51 kg)	Nguyễn Thị Tâm; Vietnam	Irish Magno; Philippines	Nao Srey Pov; Cambodia
Flyweight (51 kg)	Nguyễn Thị Tâm; Vietnam	Irish Magno; Philippines	Jutamas Jitpong; Thailand
Bantamweight (54 kg)	Nilawan Techasuep; Thailand	Đỗ Nhã Uyên; Vietnam	Aira Villegas; Philippines
Bantamweight (54 kg)	Nilawan Techasuep; Thailand	Đỗ Nhã Uyên; Vietnam	Silpa Lau Ratu; Indonesia
Featherweight (57 kg)	Nesthy Petecio; Philippines	Nwe Ni Oo; Myanmar	not awarded
Lightweight (60 kg)	Sudaporn Seesondee; Thailand	Riza Pasuit; Philippines	Vy Sreykhouch; Cambodia
Lightweight (60 kg)	Sudaporn Seesondee; Thailand	Riza Pasuit; Philippines	Huswatun Hasanah; Indonesia

== Canoeing ==
=== Canoeing & kayaking ===
Event	Gold	Silver	Bronze
Men's C1 200 m	Hermie Macaranas; Philippines	Myo Hlaing Win; Myanmar	Dương Anh Đức; Vietnam
Men's C1 1000 m	Pitpiboon Mahawattanangkul; Thailand	Hermie Macaranas; Philippines	Marjuki; Indonesia
Men's C2 200 m	Indonesia; Spens Stuber Mehue; Marjuki	Philippines; Hermie Macaranas; Ojay Fuentes	Vietnam; Nguyễn Quốc Toàn; Phan Ngọc Sang
Men's C2 1000 m	Indonesia; Anwar Tarra; Yuda Firmansyah	Myanmar; Sai Min Wai; Aung Phyo Hein	Vietnam; Bùi Thanh Phẩm; Trần Thành
Men's K1 1000 m	Maizir Riyondra; Indonesia	Trần Văn Vũ; Vietnam	Praison Buasamrong; Thailand
Women's C1 200 m	Trương Thị Phương; Vietnam	Riska Andriyani; Indonesia	Orasa Thiangkathok; Thailand
Women's C1 500 m	Trương Thị Phương; Vietnam	Riska Andriyani; Indonesia	Orasa Thiangkathok; Thailand

=== Traditional boat racing ===
Event	Gold	Silver	Bronze
Men's 4-seaters 500 m	Indonesia; Abdur Rahim; Andri Mulyana; Joko Andriyanto; Mugi Harjito; Muhamad Fajar Faturahman; Spens Stuber Mehue	Myanmar; Aung Paing Htet; Nay Htet Lin; Saw Moe Aung; Tun Tun Lin; Zaw Moe Aung; Zin Ko Htet	Thailand; Chaiyakarn Choochuen; Laor Iamluek; Suwan Kwanthong; Pipatpon Mansamer; Vinya Seechomchuen; Arun Thogme
Men's 12-seaters 200 m	Indonesia; Abdur Rahim; Andri Mulyana; Anwar Tarra; Dedi Saputra; Joko Andriyanto; Mochamad Wijaya; Mugi Harjito; Muhamad Fajar Faturahman; Muhammad Yunus Rustandi; Spens Stuber Mehue; Tri Wahyu Buwono; Yuda Firmansyah	Thailand; Chaiyakarn Choochuen; Laor Iamluek; Boonsong Imtim; Suwan Kwanthong; Pipatpon Mansamer; Santas Mingwongyang; Phawonrat Roddee; Noppadol Sangthuang; Mongkhonchai Sanitphakdi; Vinya Seechomchuen; Pornchai Tesdee; Arun Thogme; Natthawat Waenphrom; Tanawoot Waipinid	Myanmar; Aung Paing Htet; Htet Wai Lwin; Htoo Htoo Aung; Min Min Zaw; Naing Lin Oo; Nay Htet Lin; Sai Min Aung; Saw Moe Aung; Si Thu Eain; Tun Tun Lin; Zaw Htet; Zaw Min; Zaw Moe Aung; Zin Ko Htet
Women's 4-seaters 200 m	Myanmar; Hla Hla Htwe; Khin Phyu Hlaing; Kyi Lae Lae Wai; Lin Lin Kyaw; Su Wai Phyo; Win Win Htwe	Indonesia; Dayumin; Emiliana Deau; Maryati; Ramla Baharuddin; Ririn Astuti; Stevani Ibo	Thailand; Jirawan Hankhamla; Pranchalee Moonkasem; Patthama Nanthain; Nipaporn Nopsiri; Arisara Pantulap; Junjira Phimpornphirom
Mixed 22-seaters 200 m	Thailand; Kasemsit Borriboonwasin; Jaruwan Chaikan; Nattawut Kaewsri; Praewpan Kawsri; Pornprom Kramsuk; Pranchalee Moonkasem; Patthama Nanthain; Nares Naoprakon; Nipaporn Nopsiri; Arisara Pantulap; Sukanya Phoradok; Phawonrat Roddee; Chitsanupong Sangpan; Mongkhonchai Sanitphakdi; Suwalee Songkramrod; Pornchai Tesdee; Wasan Upalasueb; Natthawat Waenphrom; Tanawoot Waipinid; Phakdee Wannamanee	Indonesia; Abdur Rahim; Andri Mulyana; Ayuning Tika Vihari; Dedi Saputra; Emiliana Deau; Fajriah Nurbayan; Joko Andriyanto; Maizir Riyondra; Maryati; Masripah; Mochamad Wijaya; Mugi Harjito; Muhamad Fajar Faturahman; Muhammad Yunus Rustandi; Ramla Baharuddin; Riana Yulistrian; Rio Akbar; Ririn Astuti; Sutrisno; Tri Wahyu Buwono	Philippines; Raquel Almencion; Lealyn Baligasa; Joanna Barca; Christian Burgos; Norwell Cajes; Edmund Catapang; John Lester delos Santos; Rosalyn Esguerra; Mark Jhon Frias; Ava Kryszle Gako; Maria Theresa Mofar; Reymart Nevado; Daniel Ortega; Leojane Remarim; Rhea Roa; Pantaleon Roberto; Jonathan Ruz; John Paul Selencio; Jerome Solis; Christine Mae Talledo
Mixed 22-seaters 500 m	Indonesia; Abdur Rahim; Andri Mulyana; Anwar Tarra; Ayuning Tika Vihari; Dayumin; Dedi Saputra; Emiliana Deau; Joko Andriyanto; Masripah; Mochamad Wijaya; Mugi Harjito; Muhamad Fajar Faturahman; Muhammad Yunus Rustandi; Ramla Baharuddin; Raudani Fitra; Ririn Astuti; Spens Stuber Mehue; Stevani Ibo; Sutrisno; Tri Wahyu Buwono	Thailand; Kasemsit Borriboonwasin; Jaruwan Chaikan; Nattawut Kaewsri; Praewpan Kawsri; Pornprom Kramsuk; Pranchalee Moonkasem; Patthama Nanthain; Nares Naoprakon; Nipaporn Nopsiri; Arisara Pantulap; Sukanya Phoradok; Phawonrat Roddee; Chitsanupong Sangpan; Mongkhonchai Sanitphakdi; Suwalee Songkramrod; Pornchai Tesdee; Wasan Upalasueb; Natthawat Waenphrom; Tanawoot Waipinid; Phakdee Wannamanee	Philippines; Raquel Almencion; John Niña Andrade; Lealyn Baligasa; Joanna Barca; Arche Baylosis; Christian Burgos; Patricia Ann Bustamante; Norwell Cajes; Maribeth Caranto; Edmund Catapang; Roda Daban; John Lester delos Santos; Bernadette Espeña; Mark Jhon Frias; Ojay Fuentes; Ava Kryszle Gako; Aidelyn Lustre; Hermie Macaranas; Reymart Nevado; Rhea Roa
Mixed 22-seaters 1000 m	Indonesia; Abdur Rahim; Andri Mulyana; Anwar Tarra; Astri Dwijayanti; Dayumin; Emiliana Deau; Joko Andriyanto; Maizir Riyondra; Masripah; Mochamad Wijaya; Mugi Harjito; Muhamad Fajar Faturahman; Muhammad Yunus Rustandi; Ramla Baharuddin; Riana Yulistrian; Rio Akbar; Ririn Astuti; Spens Stuber Mehue; Stevani Ibo; Tri Wahyu Buwono	Thailand; Kasemsit Borriboonwasin; Jaruwan Chaikan; Nattawut Kaewsri; Praewpan Kawsri; Pornprom Kramsuk; Pranchalee Moonkasem; Patthama Nanthain; Nares Naoprakon; Nipaporn Nopsiri; Arisara Pantulap; Sukanya Phoradok; Phawonrat Roddee; Chitsanupong Sangpan; Mongkhonchai Sanitphakdi; Suwalee Songkramrod; Pornchai Tesdee; Wasan Upalasueb; Natthawat Waenphrom; Tanawoot Waipinid; Phakdee Wannamanee	Myanmar; Aung Khin Su Su; Aung Paing Htet; Aye Aye Thein; Hla Hla Htwe; Khin Phyu Hlaing; Kyi Lae Lae Wai; Lin Lin Kyaw; Min Min Zaw; Nay Htet Lin; Phyo Wai Lwin; Saw Moe Aung; Saw Myat Thu; Soe Sandar; Su Wai Phyo; Thet Phyo Naing; Tun Tun Lin; Win Win Htwe; Zaw Min; Zaw Moe Aung; Zin Ko Htet

== Chess ==
Event	Gold	Silver	Bronze
Men's rapid	Yeoh Li Tian; Malaysia	Nguyễn Ngọc Trường Sơn; Vietnam	Nguyễn Anh Khôi; Vietnam
Men's blitz	Susanto Megaranto; Indonesia	Lê Quang Liêm; Vietnam	Lê Tuấn Minh; Vietnam
Men's ASEAN	Uaychai Kongsee; Thailand	Mohamad Ervan; Indonesia	Wynn Zaw Htun; Myanmar
Women's rapid	Gong Qianyun; Singapore	Ummi Fisabilillah; Indonesia	Irine Kharisma Sukandar; Indonesia
Women's blitz	Medina Warda Aulia; Indonesia	Chelsie Sihite; Indonesia	Hoàng Thị Bảo Trâm; Vietnam

== Cycling ==
=== BMX ===
Event	Gold	Silver	Bronze
Men's race	Komet Sukprasert; Thailand	Daniel Caluag; Philippines	Somkid Haratawan; Thailand
Men's time trial	Komet Sukprasert; Thailand	Toni Syarifudin; Indonesia	Sittichok Kaewsrikhao; Thailand
Men's freestyle flat land	Pakphum Poosa-Art; Thailand	Chutchalerm Chaiwirotwit; Thailand	Sheikh Muhammad Taslim Shaikh Mohd Raziff; Malaysia

=== Mountain biking ===
Event	Gold	Silver	Bronze
Men's downhill	John Derick Farr; Philippines	Eleazar Barba Jr. Philippines	Andy Prayoga; Indonesia
Men's cross-country	Keerati Sukprasart; Thailand	Niño Surban; Philippines	Edmhel John Flores; Philippines
Women's downhill	Lea Denise Belgira; Philippines	Tiara Andini Prastika; Indonesia	Vipavee Deekaballes; Thailand
Women's cross-country	Đinh Thị Như Quỳnh; Vietnam	Cà Thị Thơm; Vietnam	Avegail Rombaon; Philippines

=== Road cycling ===
Event	Gold	Silver	Bronze
Men's time trial	Aiman Cahyadi; Indonesia	Thanakhan Chaiyasombat; Thailand	Goh Choon Huat; Singapore
Men's team time trial	Thailand (THA); Thurakit Boonratanathanakorn; Navuti Liphongyu; Peerapol Chawchiangkwang; Sarawut Sirironnachai	Indonesia (INA); Aiman Cahyadi; Muhammad Abdurrohman; Odie Setiawan; Robin Manullang	Philippines (PHI); Jhon Mark Camingao; Jan Paul Morales; Ronald Oranza; George Oconer
Men's road race	Sarawut Sirironnachai; Thailand	Ariya Phounsavath; Laos	Goh Choon Huat; Singapore
Men's team road race	Thailand (THA); Thurakit Boonratanathanakorn; Thanakhan Chaiyasombat; Navuti Liphongyu; Peerapol Chawchiangkwang; Sarawut Sirironnachai	Indonesia (INA); Aiman Cahyadi; Jamalidin Novardianto; Muhammad Abdurrohman; Odie Setiawan; Robin Manullang	Philippines (PHI); Jonel Carcueva; El Joshua Cariño; Marcelo Felipe; Ismael Grospe Jr. Jun Rey Navarra
Women's time trial	Jermyn Prado; Philippines	Luo Yiwei; Singapore	Phetdarin Somrat; Thailand
Women's road race	Nguyễn Thị Thật; Vietnam	Jermyn Prado; Philippines	Ayustina Delia Priatna; Indonesia

== Dancesport ==
=== Standard ===
Event	Gold	Silver	Bronze
Quickstep	Vietnam (VIE); Nguyễn Đức Hòa; Nguyễn Thị Hải Yến	Philippines (PHI); Mark Jayson Gayon; Mary Joy Renigen	Thailand (THA); Issarapong Duangkaew; Thanawan Yananun
Slow Foxtrot	Philippines (PHI); Mark Jayson Gayon; Mary Joy Renigen	Singapore (SGP); Jerome Teo; Rachel Teo	Thailand (THA); Issarapong Duangkaew; Thanawan Yananun
Tango	Philippines (PHI); Sean Mischa Aranar; Ana Leonila Nualla	Vietnam (VIE); Nguyễn Đức Hòa; Nguyễn Thị Hải Yến	Thailand (THA); Issarapong Duangkaew; Thanawan Yananun
Viennese Waltz	Philippines (PHI); Sean Mischa Aranar; Ana Leonila Nualla	Vietnam (VIE); Nguyễn Đức Hòa; Nguyễn Thị Hải Yến	Singapore (SGP); Jerome Teo; Rachel Teo
Waltz	Philippines (PHI); Mark Jayson Gayon; Mary Joy Renigen	Vietnam (VIE); Vũ Hoàng Anh Minh; Nguyễn Trường Xuân	Singapore (SGP); Jerome Teo; Rachel Teo
Five Dance	Philippines (PHI); Sean Mischa Aranar; Ana Leonila Nualla	Vietnam (VIE); Vũ Hoàng Anh Minh; Nguyễn Trường Xuân	Thailand (THA); Anucha Wijitkoon; Pasrapon Phandech

=== Latin American ===
Event	Gold	Silver	Bronze
Cha Cha Cha	Philippines (PHI); Wilbert Aunzo; Pearl Marie Cañeda	Thailand (THA); Jettapon Inthakun; Apichaya Kuptawanith	Vietnam (VIE); Nguyễn Trung Kiên; Phạm Hồng Anh
Jive	Vietnam (VIE); Nguyễn Đoàn Minh Trường; Nguyễn Trọng Nhã Uyên	Philippines (PHI); Michael Angelo Marquez; Stephanie Sabalo	Thailand (THA); Jettapon Inthakun; Apichaya Kuptawanith
Paso Doble	Philippines (PHI); Michael Angelo Marquez; Stephanie Sabalo	Thailand (THA); Shinawat Lerson; Preeyanoot Patoomsriwiroje	Singapore (SGP); Gary Tsan; Shannen Tan
Rumba	Philippines (PHI); Wilbert Aunzo; Pearl Marie Cañeda	Thailand (THA); Jettapon Inthakun; Apichaya Kuptawanith	Vietnam (VIE); Nguyễn Trung Kiên; Phạm Hồng Anh
Samba	Philippines (PHI); Wilbert Aunzo; Pearl Marie Cañeda	Vietnam (VIE); Nguyễn Đoàn Minh Trường; Nguyễn Trọng Nhã Uyên	Thailand (THA); Shinawat Lerson; Preeyanoot Patoomsriwiroje
Five Dance	Philippines (PHI); Michael Angelo Marquez; Stephanie Sabalo	Vietnam (VIE); Nguyễn Đoàn Minh Trường; Nguyễn Trọng Nhã Uyên	Thailand (THA); Shinawat Lerson; Preeyanoot Patoomsriwiroje

== Duathlon ==
Event	Gold	Silver	Bronze
Men's individual	Jauhari Johan; Indonesia	Joey Delos Reyes; Philippines	Nattawut Srinate; Thailand
Women's individual	Monica Torres; Philippines	Pareeya Sonsem; Thailand	Nguyễn Thị Phương Trinh; Vietnam
Mixed relay	Thailand (THA); Pareeya Sonsem; Nattawut Srinate; Siriwan Kuncharin; Arthit Soda	Singapore (SGP); Emma Ada Middleditch; Ahmad Arif Ibrahim; Herlene Natasha Yu; Nicholas Rachmadi	Philippines (PHI); Monica Torres; Efraim Iñigo; Mary Pauline Fornea; Emmanuel Comendador

== Esports ==
=== PC ===
Event	Gold	Silver	Bronze
Dota 2	Philippines; Bryle Alvizo; James Guerra; Jun Kanehara; Van Jerico Manalaysay; Marvin Rushton; John Anthony Vargas; Mc Nicholson Villanueva	Thailand; Anucha Jirawong; Anurat Praianun; Pipat Prariyachat; Nopparit Prugsaritanon; Thanathorn Sriiamkon; Nuengnara Teeramahanon; Poomipat Trisiripanit	Vietnam; Huỳnh Hữu Nghĩa; Nguyễn Châu Lợi; Nguyễn Hoàng Lâm; Nguyễn Quang Duy; Nguyễn Tiến Phát; Nguyễn Thành Đạt; Trịnh Văn Thọ
Starcraft II	Caviar Acampado (EnDerr); Philippines	Thomas Kopankiewicz (Blysk); Singapore	Trần Hồng Phúc (MeomaikA); Vietnam
Hearthstone	Yew Weng Kean; Malaysia	Werit Popan; Thailand	Chew Khai Kiat; Singapore

=== Console ===
Event	Gold	Silver	Bronze
Tekken 7	Nopparut Hempamorn (Book); Thailand	Alexandre Laverez (AK); Philippines	Andreij Albar (Doujin); Philippines

=== Mobile ===
Event	Gold	Silver	Bronze
Arena of Valor	Thailand; Natthaphong Chaichanasap; Natpakan Chasiri; Chanon Ketkarn; Tanapol Suntimakorn; Ratthagun Suwanchai; Chitawan Tananitikan	Indonesia; Farhan Akbari Ardiansyah; Gilang Dwi Falah; Hartanto Lius; Hartawan Muliadi; Satria Adi Wiratama	Vietnam; Đỗ Thành Hưng; Huỳnh Trọng Tuấn; Nguyễn Ngọc Linh; Nguyễn Phương Nguyên; Nguyễn Vũ Hoàng Dũng; Vương Trung Khiên
Mobile Legends: Bang Bang	Philippines; Angelo Arcangel; Jeniel Bata-anon; Allan Castromayor Jr. Karl Nepomuceno; Carlito Ribo; Jason Torculas; Kenneth Villa	Indonesia; Adriand Larsen Wong; Eko Julianto; Gustian; Muhammad Ridwan; Teguh Imam Firdaus; Yurino Putra	Malaysia; Ahmad Ali Huzaifi Abdullah; Abdul Wandi Abdul Kadir; Jamil Nurolla; Izme Haqeem Hamsjid; Muhammad Hazeem Onn; Mohd Faris Zakaria

== Fencing ==
=== Men ===
Event	Gold	Silver	Bronze
Individual épée	Nguyễn Tiến Nhật; Vietnam	Koh I Jie; Malaysia	Noelito Jose Jr. Philippines
Individual épée	Nguyễn Tiến Nhật; Vietnam	Koh I Jie; Malaysia	Nguyễn Phước Đến; Vietnam
Team épée	Vietnam; Đặng Tuấn Anh; Nguyễn Phước Đến; Nguyễn Tiến Nhật; Trương Trần Nhật Minh	Singapore; Jefferson Cheong; Samson Lee; Simon Lee; Tan Weixuan	Indonesia; Anggi Williansyah; Indra Jaya Kusuma; Nuraya Kadafie
Team épée	Vietnam; Đặng Tuấn Anh; Nguyễn Phước Đến; Nguyễn Tiến Nhật; Trương Trần Nhật Minh	Singapore; Jefferson Cheong; Samson Lee; Simon Lee; Tan Weixuan	Thailand; Kantaphat Anupongkunkit; Chinnaphat Chaloemchanen; Korakote Juengamnuaychai; Nattiphong Singkham
Individual foil	Chornnasun Mayakarn; Thailand	Hans Yoong; Malaysia	Nathaniel Perez; Philippines
Individual foil	Chornnasun Mayakarn; Thailand	Hans Yoong; Malaysia	Joshua Ian Lim; Singapore
Team foil	Singapore; Kevin Jerrold Chan; Joshua Ian Lim; Darren Tan; Jet Ng	Thailand; Ratchanavi Deejing; Chornnasun Mayakarn; Phatthanaphong Srisawat; Suppakorn Sritang-orn	Malaysia; Hydeer Akson; Adam Tahir Johan; Xing Han Cheng; Hans Yoong
Team foil	Singapore; Kevin Jerrold Chan; Joshua Ian Lim; Darren Tan; Jet Ng	Thailand; Ratchanavi Deejing; Chornnasun Mayakarn; Phatthanaphong Srisawat; Suppakorn Sritang-orn	Philippines; Shawn Felipe; Michael Nicanor; Nathaniel Perez; Jaime Viceo
Individual sabre	Vũ Thành An; Vietnam	Christian Concepcion; Philippines	Clive Leu; Singapore
Individual sabre	Vũ Thành An; Vietnam	Christian Concepcion; Philippines	Voragun Srinualnad; Thailand
Team sabre	Vietnam; Nguyễn Văn Quyết; Nguyễn Xuân Lợi; Tô Đức Anh; Vũ Thành An	Thailand; Ruangrit Haekerd; Soravit Kitsiriboon; Voragun Srinualnad; Panachai Wiriyatangsakul	Philippines; Eric Brando II; Christian Concepcion; Donnie Navarro; Eunice Villanueva
Team sabre	Vietnam; Nguyễn Văn Quyết; Nguyễn Xuân Lợi; Tô Đức Anh; Vũ Thành An	Thailand; Ruangrit Haekerd; Soravit Kitsiriboon; Voragun Srinualnad; Panachai Wiriyatangsakul	Singapore; Choy Yu Yong; Fong Zheng Jie; Clive Leu; Ahmad Huzaifah Saharudin

=== Women ===
Event	Gold	Silver	Bronze
Individual épée	Kiara Tikanah Abdul Rahman; Singapore	Hanniel Abella; Philippines	Cheryl Lim; Singapore
Individual épée	Kiara Tikanah Abdul Rahman; Singapore	Hanniel Abella; Philippines	Nguyễn Thị Như Hoa; Vietnam
Team épée	Philippines; Hanniel Abella; Mickyle Bustos; Anna Estimada; Harlene Raguin	Singapore; Kiara Tikanah Abdul Rahman; Cheryl Lim; Victoria Lim; Rebecca Ong	Thailand; Kanyapat Meechai; Wijitta Takhamwong; Korawan Thanee; Pacharaporn Vasanasomsithi
Team épée	Philippines; Hanniel Abella; Mickyle Bustos; Anna Estimada; Harlene Raguin	Singapore; Kiara Tikanah Abdul Rahman; Cheryl Lim; Victoria Lim; Rebecca Ong	Vietnam; Nguyễn Thị Như Hoa; Nguyễn Thị Trang; Trần Thị Thùy Trinh; Vũ Thị Hồng
Individual foil	Amita Berthier; Singapore	Maxine Wong; Singapore	Samantha Catantan; Philippines
Individual foil	Amita Berthier; Singapore	Maxine Wong; Singapore	Đỗ Thị Anh; Vietnam
Team foil	Singapore; Amita Berthier; Denyse Chan; Maxine Wong; Tatiana Wong	Vietnam; Đỗ Thị Anh; Lưu Thị Thanh Nhàn; Nguyễn Thị Thu Phương; Nguyễn Thu Phương	Philippines; Samantha Catantan; Maxine Esteban; Wilhelmina Lozada; Justine Gail Tinio
Team foil	Singapore; Amita Berthier; Denyse Chan; Maxine Wong; Tatiana Wong	Vietnam; Đỗ Thị Anh; Lưu Thị Thanh Nhàn; Nguyễn Thị Thu Phương; Nguyễn Thu Phương	Thailand; Nunta Chantasuvannasin; Sasinpat Doungpattra; Chayanutphat Shinnakerdchoke; Ploypailin Thongchampa
Individual sabre	Jylyn Nicanor; Philippines	Diah Permatasari; Indonesia	Ann Lee; Singapore
Individual sabre	Jylyn Nicanor; Philippines	Diah Permatasari; Indonesia	Tonpan Pokeaw; Thailand
Team sabre	Thailand; Pornsawan Ngernrungruangroj; Tonpan Pokeaw; Tonkhaw Phokaew; Bandhita Srinualnad	Vietnam; Bùi Thị Thu Hà; Đỗ Thị Tâm; Lê Minh Hằng; Phùng Thị Khánh Linh	Singapore; Ann Lee; Jolie Lee; Lee Kar Moon; Jessica Ong
Team sabre	Thailand; Pornsawan Ngernrungruangroj; Tonpan Pokeaw; Tonkhaw Phokaew; Bandhita Srinualnad	Vietnam; Bùi Thị Thu Hà; Đỗ Thị Tâm; Lê Minh Hằng; Phùng Thị Khánh Linh	Philippines; Kemberly Camahalan; Allaine Cortey; Queen Dalmacio; Jylyn Nicanor
