= Cycling at the 2025 SEA Games =

- Venue: Khao Yai National Park, Chulachomklao Royal Military Academy, Khao Kheow Open Zoo, Kamol Sports Park, Velodrome at Huamark Sports Complex
- Location: Prachinburi, Nakhon Nayok, Chonburi, and Bangkok, Thailand
- Dates: 10–19 December 2025

Cycling competitions at the 2025 SEA Games were held at various locations. Road racing took place at Khao Yai National Park and Chulachomklao Royal Military Academy in Mueang Prachinburi, Prachinburi. Mountain biking was held at Khao Kheow Open Zoo in Si Racha, Chonburi. BMX cycling took place at Kamol Sports Park in Nong Chok, Bangkok. Track cycling took place at the Velodrome at Huamark Sports Complex in Bang Kapi, Bangkok. The competitions took place from 10 to 19 December 2025.

== Medal table ==
* Host nation (Thailand)

| Rank | Nation | Gold | Silver | Bronze | Total |
|---|---|---|---|---|---|
| 1 | Thailand* | 10 | 7 | 3 | 20 |
| 2 | Malaysia | 4 | 4 | 1 | 9 |
| 3 | Indonesia | 3 | 4 | 4 | 11 |
| 4 | Laos | 0 | 1 | 0 | 1 |
| 4 | Singapore | 0 | 1 | 0 | 1 |
| 6 | Philippines | 0 | 0 | 5 | 5 |
| 7 | Vietnam | 0 | 0 | 2 | 2 |
| Totals (7 entries) | | 17 | 17 | 15 | 49 |

== Medalists ==
=== BMX ===
| Event | Gold | Silver | Bronze |
|---|---|---|---|
| Men's time trial | Komet Sukprasert; Thailand | Putthaphum Nakpaen; Thailand | Patrick Bren Coo; Philippines |
| Men's racing | Komet Sukprasert; Thailand | Putthaphum Nakpaen; Thailand | Patrick Bren Coo; Philippines |

=== Mountain biking ===
| Event | Gold | Silver | Bronze |
|---|---|---|---|
| Men's downhill | Methasit Boonsane; Thailand | Rendy Varera Sanjaya; Indonesia | John Derick Farr; Philippines |
| Men's cross country eliminator | Rendy Varera Sanjaya; Indonesia | Zulfikri Zulkifli; Malaysia | Mark Louwel Valderama; Philippines |
| Women's downhill | Vipavee Deekaballes; Thailand | Riska Amelia Agustina; Indonesia | Kanokrat Ritthidet; Thailand |

=== Road cycling ===
Men

| Event | Gold | Silver | Bronze |
|---|---|---|---|
| Individual time trial | Peerapol Chawchiangkwang; Thailand | Ariya Phounsavath; Laos | Aiman Cahyadi; Indonesia |
| Team time trial | Indonesia; Aiman Cahyadi; Muhammad Raihan Maulidan; Muhammad Andy Royan; Muhammad Syelhan Nurrahmat; Maulana Astnan Al Hayat | Thailand; Navuti Liphongyu; Thanakhan Chaiyasombat; Tullatorn Sosalam; Peerapol Chawchiangkwang; Sarawut Sirironnachai | Philippines; Joseph Javiniar; Nichol Pareja; Ronald Oranza; Nash Joshua Lim; Joshua Pascual |
| Individual road race | Sarawut Sirironnachai; Thailand | Muhammad Syelhan Nurrahmat; Indonesia | Phạm Lê Xuân Lộc; Vietnam |
| Team road race | Thailand; Thanakhan Chaiyasombat; Ratchanon Yaowarat; Nattapol Jumchat; Peerapol Chawchiangkwang; Sarawut Sirironnachai; Noppachai Klahan | Indonesia; Aiman Cahyadi; Muhammad Raihan Maulidan; Muhammad Andy Royan; Muhammad Abdurrohman; Muhammad Syelhan Nurrahmat; Maulana Astnan Al Hayat | Malaysia; Muhammad Syawal Mazlin; Nur Amirul Fakhruddin Mazuki; Ren Bao Tsen; Zhe Yie Kee; Nur Aiman Mohd Zariff; Muhamad Zawawi Azman |

Women

| Event | Gold | Silver | Bronze |
|---|---|---|---|
| Individual time trial | Ayustina Delia Priatna; Indonesia | Phetdarin Somrat; Thailand | Chaniporn Batriya; Thailand |
| Individual road race | Jutatip Maneephan; Thailand | Nur Aisyah Mohamad Zubir; Malaysia | Ayustina Delia Priatna; Indonesia |
| Criterium | Jutatip Maneephan; Thailand | Nur Aisyah Mohamad Zubir; Malaysia | Nguyễn Thị Thật; Vietnam |

=== Track cycling ===
Men

| Event | Gold | Silver | Bronze |
|---|---|---|---|
| Keirin | Muhammad Ridwan Sahrom; Malaysia | Jai Angsuthasawit; Thailand | Norasetthada Bunma; Thailand |
| Points race | Turakit Boonratanathanakorn; Thailand | Lau New Joe; Malaysia | Bernard Van Aert; Indonesia |
| Team pursuit | Malaysia; Lau New Joe; Muhammad Hafiq Mohd Jafri; Abdul Azim Aliyas; Muhammad Yusri Shaari | Thailand; Warut Paekrathok; Putipong Chaloemsrimueang; Thak Kaeonoi; Nattakrit Kaeonoi | not awarded |
| Team sprint | Malaysia; Fadhil Zonis; Mohd Akmal Nazimi Jusena; Muhammad Ridwan Sahrom | Thailand; Yeaunyong Petcharat; Jai Angsuthasawit; Norasetthada Bunma | not awarded |

Women

| Event | Gold | Silver | Bronze |
|---|---|---|---|
| Scratch | Nur Aisyah Mohamad Zubir; Malaysia | Valencia Tan; Singapore | Ayustina Delia Priatna; Indonesia |
