= Cycling at the 2018 Asian Games – Men's road race =

Men's road race at the 2018 Asian Games
- Venue: Subang
- Date: 23 August 2018
- Competitors: 57 from 18 nations

Medalists
gold medal	Alexey Lutsenko	Kazakhstan
silver medal	Fumiyuki Beppu	Japan
bronze medal	Navuti Liphongyu	Thailand

The men's 145.5 kilometers individual road race competition at the 2018 Asian Games was held on 23 August 2018 in Subang.

== Schedule ==
All times are Western Indonesia Time (UTC+07:00)

Date	Time	Event
Thursday, 23 August 2018	10:00	Final

== Results ==
Legend

- DNS — Did not start

Rank	Athlete	Time
1st place, gold medalist(s)	Alexey Lutsenko (KAZ)	3:25:25
2nd place, silver medalist(s)	Fumiyuki Beppu (JPN)	3:25:25
3rd place, bronze medalist(s)	Navuti Liphongyu (THA)	3:25:25
4	Peerapol Chawchiangkwang (THA)	3:25:25
5	Hideto Nakane (JPN)	3:25:40
6	Jang Kyung-gu (KOR)	3:25:52
7	Thanakhan Chaiyasombat (THA)	3:25:54
8	Saeid Safarzadeh (IRI)	3:26:00
9	Aiman Cahyadi (INA)	3:26:01
10	Robin Manullang (INA)	3:26:01
11	Feng Chun-kai (TPE)	3:26:03
12	Sarawut Sirironnachai (THA)	3:26:05
13	Nik Azwan Zulkifle (MAS)	3:26:07
14	Samad Pourseyedi (IRI)	3:26:10
15	Muradjan Khalmuratov (UZB)	3:26:13
16	Phan Hoàng Thái (VIE)	3:27:07
17	Choy Hiu Fung (HKG)	3:27:34
18	Zawawi Azman (MAS)	3:27:35
19	Dadi Suryadi (INA)	3:27:45
20	Quàng Văn Cường (VIE)	3:28:15
21	Sainbayaryn Jambaljamts (MGL)	3:28:23
22	Seo Joon-yong (KOR)	3:29:10
23	Yousif Mirza (UAE)	3:29:10
24	Chiu Ho San (HKG)	3:29:10
25	Ariya Phounsavath (LAO)	3:29:10
26	Chen Chien-liang (TPE)	3:29:31
27	Yousef Srouji (SYR)	3:29:56
28	Liu Jiankun (CHN)	3:29:56
29	Tuulkhangain Tögöldör (MGL)	3:29:56
30	Trần Thanh Điền (VIE)	3:30:13
31	Kok Mun Wa (MAC)	3:31:26
32	Mehdi Sohrabi (IRI)	3:31:34
33	Mohammad Ganjkhanloo (IRI)	3:31:34
34	Jamal Hibatullah (INA)	3:31:41
35	Nur Amirul Fakhruddin Mazuki (MAS)	3:32:21
36	Mohd Shahrul Mat Amin (MAS)	3:32:21
37	Huỳnh Thanh Tùng (VIE)	3:32:21
38	Choi Dong-hyeok (KOR)	3:33:26
39	Andrey Izmaylov (UZB)	3:34:07
40	Yevgeniy Gidich (KAZ)	3:35:19
41	Cheung King Lok (HKG)	3:35:49
42	Zhandos Bizhigitov (KAZ)	3:36:12
43	Daniil Fominykh (KAZ)	3:36:12
44	Vincent Lau (HKG)	3:36:12
45	Liu En-chieh (TPE)	3:36:12
46	Lao Long San (MAC)	3:36:12
47	Bai Lijun (CHN)	3:36:12
48	Zhang Chunlong (CHN)	3:38:17
49	Thavone Phonasa (LAO)	3:40:06
50	Enkhtaivany Bolor-Erdene (MGL)	3:41:15
51	Joo Dae-yeong (KOR)	3:41:48
52	Niu Yikui (CHN)	3:42:25
53	Ahmed Al-Mansoori (UAE)	3:47:38
54	Saif Al-Kaabi (UAE)	3:47:38
55	Mohammed Al-Mansoori (UAE)	3:47:38
—	Yahiaaldien Khalefa (BRN)	DNS
—	Batmönkhiin Maral-Erdene (MGL)	DNS
