= Aiman Cahyadi =

Indonesian cyclist

Personal information
- Full name: Aiman Cahyadi
- Born: 16 November 1993 (age 32) Bandung, Indonesia
- Height: 1.69 m (5 ft 7 in)
- Weight: 60 kg (132 lb)

Cycling career
- Sport: Cycling
- Discipline: Road
- Role: Rider

Amateur team
- 2016: Gehhenk Bike

Professional teams
- 2015–2016: Pegasus Continental Cycling Team
- 2017–2018: Team Sapura Cycling
- 2019–2022: PGN Road Cycling Team
- 2023–2025: Terengganu Polygon Cycling Team
Medal record
Men's Cycling
Representing Indonesia
SEA Games
Gold medal – first place	2019 Philippines	Men's time trial
Gold medal – first place	2025 Thailand	Men's time trial team
Silver medal – second place	2019 Philippines	Men's road race team
Silver medal – second place	2019 Philippines	Men's time trial team
Silver medal – second place	2021 Vietnam	Men's road race
Silver medal – second place	2021 Vietnam]	Men's time trial
Silver medal – second place	2023 Cambodia]	Men's road race
Bronze medal – third place	2025 Thailand	Men's time trial

Aiman Cahyadi (born 16 November 1993) is an Indonesian cyclist,

He rides for UCI Continental team Terengganu Cycling Team from 2023 to 2025.

== Major results ==
2012
8th Overall Tour de Ijen
2013
1st Road race, National Road Championships
5th Road race, Southeast Asian Games
8th Overall Tour de Singkarak
9th Time trial, Asian Under-23 Road Championships
2014
9th Time trial, Asian Under-23 Road Championships
2015
9th Overall Tour de Ijen
2016
8th Tour de Jakarta
2017
1st Overall Tour de Siak

1st Stage 1

8th Overall Tour de Molvccas
9th Overall Tour de Selangor

1st Stage 3

9th Overall Jelajah Malaysia
10th Road race, Southeast Asian Games
2018
5th Overall Tour de Lombok Mandalika

1st Points classification

Asian Games

7th Time trial
9th Road race

7th Overall Tour de Indonesia
2019
Southeast Asian Games

1st Time trial
2nd Team road race
2nd Team time trial
10th Road race

National Road Championships

1st Time trial
4th Road race

1st Stage 2 Tour de Ijen
4th Overall Tour of Quanzhou Bay
6th Overall Tour de Filipinas
7th Overall PRUride Philippines
9th Overall Tour de Indonesia
2020
5th Overall Cambodia Bay Cycling Tour
2021
Southeast Asian Games

2nd Road race
2nd Time trial

5th Time trial, National Road Championships
2022
National Road Championships

1st Road race
3rd Time trial

7th Time trial, Asian Road Championships
9th Time trial, Islamic Solidarity Games
2023
National Road Championships

1st Time trial
2nd Road race

1st Mountains classification, Tour of Sharjah
Southeast Asian Games

2nd Road race
9th Criterium

7th Overall Tour of Binzhou
7th Hong Kong Challenge
9th Road race, Asian Road Championships
9th Time trial, Asian Games
10th Grand Prix Apollon Temple
2025
Southeast Asian Games

1st Time Trial Team
3rd Time trial
