= Cycling at the 2026 Asian Games – Men's BMX racing =

Men's BMX racing at the 2026 Asian Games
- Venue: Nagoya Velodrome BMX Race Course
- Date: 28 September 2026
- Competitors: 12 from 6 nations

Medalists
gold medal	Asuma Nakai	Japan
silver medal	Hyoga Kiuchi	Japan
bronze medal	Lin Haochao	China

The men's BMX racing competition at the 2026 Asian Games was held on 28 September 2026 at the Nagoya Velodrome BMX Race Course. Asuma Nakai of Japan, the winner of the 2022 event successfully defended his Asian Games title, with his teammate Hyoga Kiuchi taking silver and Lin Haochao of China the bronze.

== Schedule ==
All times are Japan Standard Time (UTC+09:00)

Date	Time	Event
Monday, 28 September 2026	10:50	Motos run 1
Monday, 28 September 2026	11:20	Motos run 2
Monday, 28 September 2026	11:50	Motos run 3
Monday, 28 September 2026	12:18	Final

== Results ==
Legend

- DNF — Did not finish

=== Motos ===
==== Heat 1 ====
Rank	Athlete	Run 1		Run 2		Run 3		Total
Rank	Athlete	Time	Pts	Time	Pts	Time	Pts	Total
1	Asuma Nakai (JPN)	29.895	1	30.463	1	29.714	1	3
2	Patrick Coo (PHI)	30.887	2	32.179	3	30.594	2	7
3	Chen Yucheng (CHN)	32.127	5	32.615	4	31.621	3	12
4	Fasya Ahsana Rifki (INA)	32.017	4	35.108	5	31.916	4	13
5	Hong Ju-ho (KOR)	31.235	3	DNF	6	56.196	5	14
6	Daniel Caluag (PHI)	33.365	6	31.608	2	2:05.312	6	14

==== Heat 2 ====
Rank	Athlete	Run 1		Run 2		Run 3		Total
Rank	Athlete	Time	Pts	Time	Pts	Time	Pts	Total
1	Hyoga Kiuchi (JPN)	31.067	3	30.663	1	30.111	1	5
2	Komet Sukprasert (THA)	30.437	1	31.073	2	30.189	2	5
3	Putthaphum Nakpaen (THA)	30.705	2	DNF	6	31.044	3	11
4	Lin Haochao (CHN)	32.603	4	32.223	3	32.438	5	12
5	Rio Akbar (INA)	32.987	5	32.332	4	31.752	4	13
6	Yoon Joon-soo (KOR)	33.617	6	DNF	6	DNF	6	18

Riders ranked 1–4 in each heat qualified for the final.

=== Final ===
Rank	Athlete	Time
1st place, gold medalist(s)	Asuma Nakai (JPN)	30.103
2nd place, silver medalist(s)	Hyoga Kiuchi (JPN)	30.583
3rd place, bronze medalist(s)	Lin Haochao (CHN)	32.947
4	Fasya Ahsana Rifki (INA)	32.980
5	Chen Yucheng (CHN)	33.466
6	Putthaphum Nakpaen (THA)	38.581
7	Patrick Coo (PHI)	54.897
8	Komet Sukprasert (THA)	DNF
