= Goh Choon Huat =

Singaporean cyclist

Personal information
- Full name: Goh Choon Huat
- Born: 14 December 1990 (age 35)
- Height: 1.7 m (5 ft 7 in)
- Weight: 54 kg (119 lb)

Cycling career
- Sport: Cycling
- Current team: Retired
- Discipline: Road
- Role: Rider

Professional teams
- 2012–2014: OCBC Singapore Continental Cycling Team
- 2015–2022: Terengganu Cycling Team

Goh Choon Huat (simplified Chinese: 吴浚发; traditional Chinese: 吳浚發; pinyin: Wú Jùnfā; born 14 December 1990) is a Singaporean former cyclist, who competed as a professional from 2012 to 2022.

== Major results ==
2011
2nd Road race, National Road Championships
2012
National Road Championships

2nd Road Race
2nd Time trial

2016
1st Time trial, National Road Championships
2017
1st Road race, National Road Championships
2018
National Road Championships

1st Road race
1st Time trial

2019
National Road Championships

1st Road race
1st Time trial

2nd Overall Tour de Filipinas
Southeast Asian Games

3rd Time trial
3rd Road race

5th Overall Tour of Peninsular
2020
4th Overall Cambodia Bay Cycling Tour
2022
National Road Championships

1st Time trial
2nd Road race

Southeast Asian Games

6th Time trial
8th Road race

== See also ==
- List of Singaporean records in track cycling
