= Asuma Nakai =

Japanese BMX rider (born 2000)

Personal information
- Born: 24 June 2000 (age 26)

Cycling career
- Sport: Cycling
- Discipline: BMX racing
Medal record
Representing Japan
Men's BMX racing
Asian Games
Gold medal – first place	2022 Hangzhou	BMX racing
Gold medal – first place	2026 Nagoya	BMX racing

Asuma Nakai (Japanese: 中井飛馬, born 24 June 2000) is a Japanese BMX racer. He was Asian Games champion at the 2022 and 2026 Asian Games.

== Early life ==
From Jōetsu, Niigata, he began competing in BMX at age of five years-old. By the age of 11, he was a finalist at the world championships in his age category.

== Career ==
In 2019, Nakai won the All-Japan Championships in his first year in the elite class. In 2021, he became the first Japanese rider to win the U23 series championship in the UCI BMX World Cup series. Nakai won a gold medal at the delayed 2022 Asian Games held in Hangzhou, China in 2023, finishing ahead of Komet Sukprasert of Thailand.

Although he missed the 2024 Olympic Games due to injuries affecting his ability to compete at the highest level, the next year he moved his base to Nagoya, in order to gain familiarity with the course used for the upcoming Asian Games. In September 2026, he won the gold medal at the 2026 Asian Games in Nagoya, retaining his Asian Games title, finishing ahead of compatriot Hyoga Kiuchi and Lin Haochao of China.
