= Thailand Continental Cycling Team =

Thai cycling team

Team information
- UCI code: TCC
- Registered: Thailand
- Founded: 2017
- Discipline: Road
- Bicycles: Specialized

Key personnel
- General manager: Wisut Kasiyaphat
- Team managers: Li Xiaole; Adisak Wannasri

Team name history
- 2017–: Thailand Continental Cycling Team

Thailand Continental Cycling Team is a Thai UCI Continental cycling team established in 2017.

== Team roster ==
As of 14 February 2022.

Rider	Date of birth
Turakit Boonratanathanakorn (THA)	18 March 1989 (age 37)
Thanakhan Chaiyasombat (THA)	26 June 1999 (age 27)
Peerapol Chawchiangkwang (THA)	17 October 1986 (age 39)
Noppachai Klahan (THA)	9 December 2000 (age 25)
Navuti Liphongyu (THA)	18 October 1991 (age 34)

Rider	Date of birth
Yuttana Mano (THA)	26 March 1997 (age 29)
Ariya Phounsavath (LAO)	2 March 1991 (age 35)
Thanawut Sanikwathi (THA)	13 June 1993 (age 33)
Sarawut Sirironnachai (THA)	23 August 1992 (age 34)
Setthawut Yordsuwan (THA)	18 March 1994 (age 32)

== Major wins ==
2017
Stage 2 Tour of Thailand, Thanawut Sanikwathi
2018
Overall Tour of Indonesia, Ariya Phounsavath

Stage 4 Peerapol Chawchiangkwang

Stage 4 Tour de Singkarak, Thanakhan Chaiyasombat
2019
Stage 5 The Princess Maha Chakri Sirindhorn's Cup, Sarawut Sirironnachai
2020
Thailand National Time Trial Championships, Sarawut Sirironnachai
Stage 1 The Princess Maha Chakri Sirindhorn's Cup, Thanawut Sanikwathi
Stages 3 & 4 The Princess Maha Chakri Sirindhorn's Cup, Sarawut Sirironnachai
2021
Stage 3 The Princess Maha Chakri Sirindhorn's Cup, Sarawut Sirironnachai

== National champions ==
2020
Thailand Time Trial, Sarawut Sirironnachai
