= Cycling at the 2018 Asian Games – Men's individual time trial =

Men's individual time trial at the 2018 Asian Games
- Venue: Subang
- Date: 24 August 2018
- Competitors: 18 from 18 nations

Medalists
gold medal	Alexey Lutsenko	Kazakhstan
silver medal	Muradjan Khalmuratov	Uzbekistan
bronze medal	Fumiyuki Beppu	Japan

The men's road time trial competition at the 2018 Asian Games took place on 24 August 2018 in Subang.

== Schedule ==
All times are Western Indonesia Time (UTC+07:00)

Date	Time	Event
Friday, 24 August 2018	14:00	Final

== Results ==
Legend

- DNS — Did not start

Rank	Athlete	Time
1st place, gold medalist(s)	Alexey Lutsenko (KAZ)	55:37.13
2nd place, silver medalist(s)	Muradjan Khalmuratov (UZB)	57:10.52
3rd place, bronze medalist(s)	Fumiyuki Beppu (JPN)	57:19.20
4	Choe Hyeong-min (KOR)	57:36.39
5	Feng Chun-kai (TPE)	58:19.19
6	Arvin Moazzami (IRI)	58:56.33
7	Aiman Cahyadi (INA)	59:36.23
8	Shi Hang (CHN)	1:01:38.71
9	Turakit Boonratanathanakorn (THA)	1:01:53.81
10	Fung Ka Hoo (HKG)	1:02:29.66
11	Eugen Wacker (KGZ)	1:03:34.12
12	Batmönkhiin Maral-Erdene (MGL)	1:04:02.05
13	Nik Azwan Zulkifle (MAS)	1:04:57.20
14	Phan Hoàng Thái (VIE)	1:05:58.95
15	Lao Long San (MAC)	1:06:12.20
16	Ariya Phounsavath (LAO)	1:06:23.11
17	Hassan Al-Marwi (UAE)	1:08:59.50
—	Yousef Srouji (SYR)	DNS
