= Peerapol Chawchiangkwang =

Thai cyclist (born 1986)

Personal information
- Full name: Peerapol Chawchiangkwang
- Born: 17 October 1986 (age 39) Chiang Mai, Thailand
- Height: 1.79 m (5 ft 10 in)
- Weight: 64 kg (141 lb)

Cycling career
- Sport: Cycling
- Current team: Thailand Continental Cycling Team
- Disciplines: Road; Mountain biking
- Role: Rider

Professional team
- 2017–: Thailand Continental Cycling Team
Medal record
Representing Thailand
Mountain bike racing
Southeast Asian Games
Gold medal – first place	2013 Naypyidaw	Men's cross-country
Silver medal – second place	2013 Naypyidaw	Mixed team relay
Asian Championships
Gold medal – first place	2015 Malacca City	Mixed team relay
Gold medal – first place	2016 Chai Nat	Mixed team relay
Bronze medal – third place	2020 Chiang Rai	Men's cross-country
Men's road bicycle racing
Asian Championships
Silver medal – second place	2025 Phitsanulok	Road race
Southeast Asian Games
Gold medal – first place	2019 Tagaytay	Team road race
Gold medal – first place	2019 Tagaytay	Team time trial
Gold medal – first place	2021 Hòa Bình	Team time trial
Gold medal – first place	2025 Prachinburi	Individual time trial
Gold medal – first place	2025 Prachinburi	Team road race
Silver medal – second place	2017 Kuala Lumpur	Team time trial
Silver medal – second place	2025 Prachinburi	Team time trial

Peerapol Chawchiangkwang (born 17 October 1986 in Chiang Mai) is a Thai cyclist, who rides for UCI Continental team Thailand Continental Cycling Team.

== Major results ==
=== Road ===
2013
3rd Road race, National Road Championships
2014
1st Road race, National Road Championships
2015
2nd Road race, National Road Championships
2017
2nd Team time trial, Southeast Asian Games
7th Overall Tour de Singkarak
10th Overall Tour de Kumano
2018
2nd Overall Tour de Indonesia

1st Stage 4

4th Road race, Asian Games
2019
Southeast Asian Games

1st Team time trial
1st Team road race
8th Road race

2020
National Road Championships

2nd Road race
3rd Time trial

5th Overall Tour of Thailand
2021
National Road Championships

1st Time trial
2nd Road race

2022
1st Team time trial, Southeast Asian Games
1st Time trial, National Road Championships
7th Overall Tour of Azerbaijan (Iran)
2023
National Road Championships

1st Time trial
3rd Road race

=== Mountain biking ===
2013
Southeast Asian Games

1st Cross-country
2nd Mixed team relay

2015
1st Mixed team relay, Asian Championships
2016
1st Mixed team relay, Asian Championships
2020
3rd Cross-country, Asian Championships
