= Ayustina Delia Priatna =

Indonesian cyclist

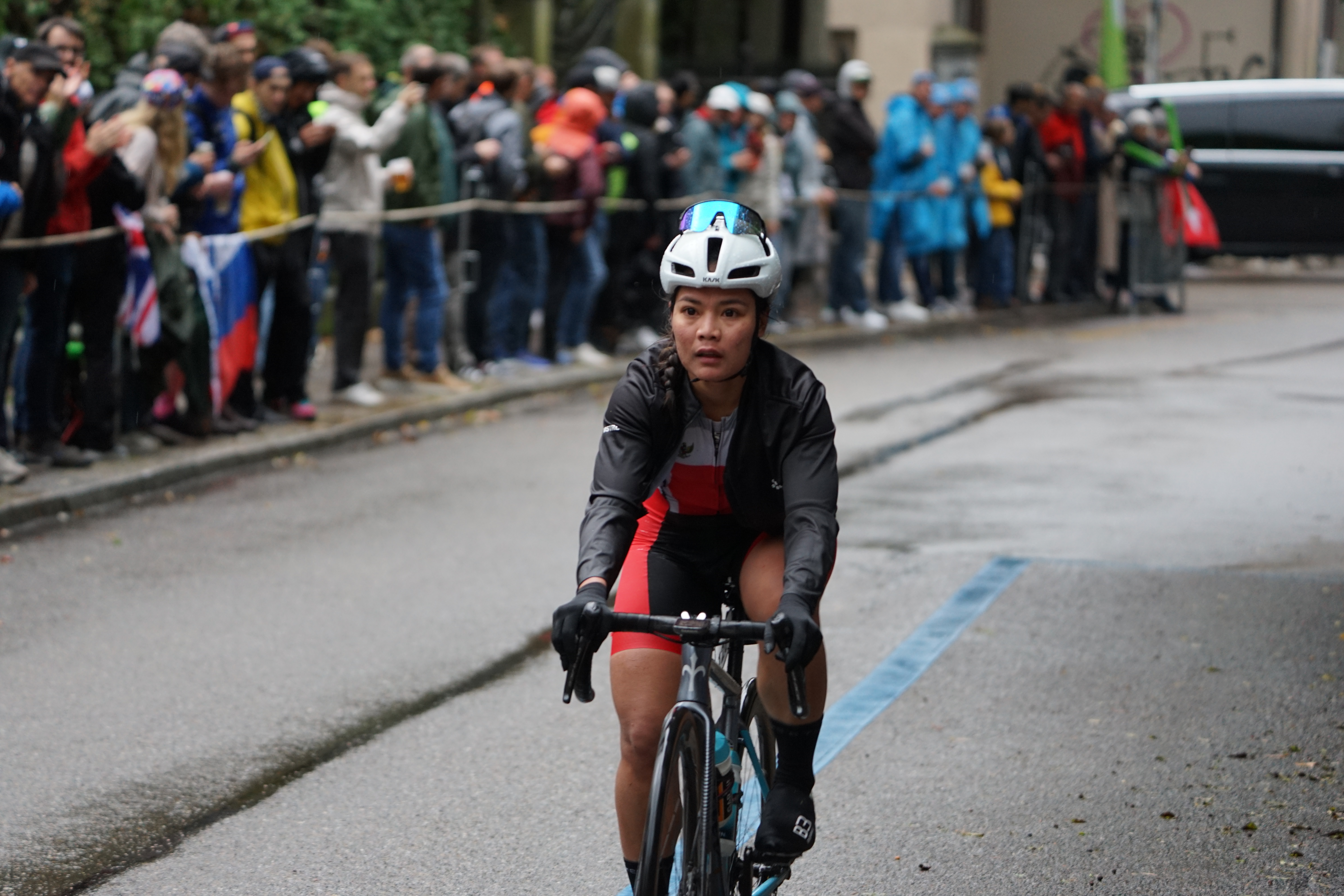
- Ayustina Delia Priatna during the 2024 World Championships

Personal information
- Born: 12 December 1997 (age 28) Bandung, West Java, Indonesia

Cycling career
- Sport: Cycling
- Disciplines: Road cycling Track cycling
- Role: Rider
Medal record
Representing Indonesia
Women's track cycling
Islamic Solidarity Games
Silver medal – second place	2021 Konya	Omnium
Asian Championships
Silver medal – second place	2022 New Delhi	Omnium
SEA Games
Bronze medal – third place	2025 Thailand	Scratch
Women's road racing
Asian Championships
Silver medal – second place	2022 Dushanbe	Individual time trial
SEA Games
Gold medal – first place	2021 Vietnam	Individual time trial
Gold medal – first place	2025 Thailand	Individual time trial
Bronze medal – third place	2021 Vietnam	Individual road race
Bronze medal – third place	2019 Manila	Individual road race
Bronze medal – third place	2017 Kuala Lumpur	Individual road race
Bronze medal – third place	2025 Thailand	Individual road race

Ayustina Delia Priatna (born 12 December 1997) is an Indonesian female road cyclist and track cyclist. She won the silver medal in the omnium at the 2022 Asian Track Cycling Championships.
