= Cycling at the 2018 Asian Games – Women's downhill =

Women's downhill at the 2018 Asian Games
- Venue: Khe Bun Hill
- Date: 20 August 2018
- Competitors: 8 from 6 nations

Medalists
gold medal	Tiara Andini Prastika	Indonesia
silver medal	Vipavee Deekaballes	Thailand
bronze medal	Nining Porwaningsih	Indonesia

The women's downhill competition at the 2018 Asian Games was held on 20 August 2018 at the Khe Bun Hill Subang.

== Schedule ==
All times are Western Indonesia Time (UTC+07:00)

Date	Time	Event
Monday, 20 August 2018	10:30	Seeding run
Monday, 20 August 2018	13:00	Final

== Results ==
=== Seeding run ===
Rank	Athlete	Time
1	Tiara Andini Prastika (INA)	2:32.677
2	Nining Porwaningsih (INA)	2:40.781
3	Vipavee Deekaballes (THA)	2:46.733
4	Siraphatson Chatkamnoed (THA)	2:49.285
5	Quàng Thị Soan (VIE)	2:56.132
6	Chou Pei-ni (TPE)	3:02.325
7	Lea Denise Belgira (PHI)	3:07.479
8	Cabral Marques (TLS)	4:31.670

=== Final ===
Rank	Athlete	Time
1st place, gold medalist(s)	Tiara Andini Prastika (INA)	2:33.056
2nd place, silver medalist(s)	Vipavee Deekaballes (THA)	2:42.654
3rd place, bronze medalist(s)	Nining Porwaningsih (INA)	2:42.664
4	Siraphatson Chatkamnoed (THA)	2:44.748
5	Chou Pei-ni (TPE)	2:46.516
6	Lea Denise Belgira (PHI)	2:55.749
7	Quàng Thị Soan (VIE)	2:59.643
8	Cabral Marques (TLS)	4:23.817
