= Yuttana Mano =

Thai cyclist (born 1997)

Personal information
- Full name: Yuttana Mano
- Born: 26 March 1997 (age 29)

Cycling career
- Sport: Cycling
- Current team: Thailand Continental Cycling Team
- Discipline: Road
- Role: Rider

Professional teams
- 2017: Thailand Continental Cycling Team
- 2021–: Thailand Continental Cycling Team

Yuttana Mano (born 26 March 1997) is a Thai cyclist, who currently rides for UCI Continental team Thailand Continental Cycling Team.

== Major results ==
2015
2nd Time trial, Asian Junior Road Championships
2016
4th Time trial, Asian Under-23 Road Championships
2018
5th Time trial, Asian Under-23 Road Championships
2020
1st Stage 6 Tour of Thailand
9th Time trial, National Road Championships
2022
3rd Time trial, National Road Championships
