= Nathan Dahlberg =

New Zealand cyclist (1965–2024)

Personal information
- Full name: Roger Nathan Dahlberg
- Born: 22 February 1965 Wanganui, New Zealand
- Died: 22 August 2024 (aged 59) China

Cycling career
- Sport: Cycling
- Discipline: Road
- Role: Rider

Professional teams
- 1988–1991: 7-Eleven–Hoonved
- 1992: Spago
- 1994: Motorola
- 1997: Village – Peddler
- 1999: Team Hohenfelder – Concorde
- 2003–2005: Marco Polo

Managerial team
- 2005–2012: Marco Polo

Roger Nathan Dahlberg (22 February 1965 – 22 August 2024) was a New Zealand racing cyclist. He rode in the Tour de France in 1988 and 1989 and was 39th in the 1990 Giro d'Italia. Dahlberg spent his career being a domestique for other riders and occasionally being allowed to race for himself.

After retiring from racing Dahlberg managed the Marco Polo Cycling–Donckers Koffie until it folded in 2012. In 2015 he set sights on the world record for highest elevation cycled. He chose Broad Peak as the place for this attempt as it provided flat enough terrain to ride the required 20m for the record. While he was hiking up the 12th highest mountain in the world he slipped on some ice and fell down the hill but was able to use his ice pick to stop himself. He survived with just a head cut but lost his passport and other valuables. His team abandoned the expedition at the second camp as conditions were unsuitable for the attempt.

Dahlberg died in China on 22 August 2024, at the age of 59.

== Career ==
=== 7/11 cycling team ===
Dahlberg's professional cycling career started with the 7-Eleven–Hoonved team in 1988. His first race for the team was Tour of the Basque Country where he came 73rd overall. He then rode Amstel Gold Race and Bordeaux–Paris followed by the GP Betekom where he placed sixth.

Dahlberg's first Tour de France participation was at the expense of his teammate, Bob Roll, who crashed into a spectator the day before the Tour started. Dahlberg had just come home from a training ride, and was met by a staff member from the team saying he needed to get to France tomorrow. They ended up driving all night and arrived at 5:30am with the first stage starting at 9am.

=== Amateur again ===
In 2001 Dahlberg did not race for a professional team but he still managed to get some great results. In April he won the Tour du Maroc, a 13-stage race in Morocco. He won Stage 5 of the race by 54 seconds taking the leaders jersey then not losing time to his rivals in the remaining stages.

=== Marco Polo ===
In 2005 while riding for Marco Polo Dahlberg and fellow kiwi cyclist Robin Reid had a competition to see who could reach 10,000 km the fastest. Dahlberg lost as he spent a lot of 2005 being the team director.

== Major results ==
1985
2nd Grand Prix de la ville de Pérenchies
1988
6th GP Betekom
1990
1st Stage 1 Tour de Suisse
7th Giro della Toscana
1991
1st Stage 9 Ruta Mexico
3rd Reading Classic
6th Trofeo dell'Etna
1992
3rd Overall Casper Classic

1st Stage 8

2000
10th Overall Tour of South China Sea
2001
1st Overall Tour du Maroc

1st Stage 5

4th Overall Tour du Faso
10th Overall Perlis Open
2002
1st Stage 2 Tour de Serbia
2004
1st Overall Tour d'Indonesia
2010
7th Overall Tour d'Indonesia
