= Cycling at the 2019 SEA Games =

- Venue: Tagaytay Extreme Sports Complex
- Location: Tagaytay, Philippines
- Date: 1–10 December

The cycling competitions at the 2019 SEA Games in Philippines were held in Tagaytay from 1 to 10 December 2019.

== Medal table ==
* Host nation (Philippines)

Rank	Nation	Gold	Silver	Bronze	Total
1	Thailand	7	2	4	13
2	Philippines*	3	4	4	11
3	Vietnam	2	1	0	3
4	Indonesia	1	4	2	7
5	Singapore	0	1	2	3
6	Laos	0	1	0	1
7	Malaysia	0	0	1	1
Totals (7 entries)		13	13	13	39

== Medalists ==
=== BMX ===
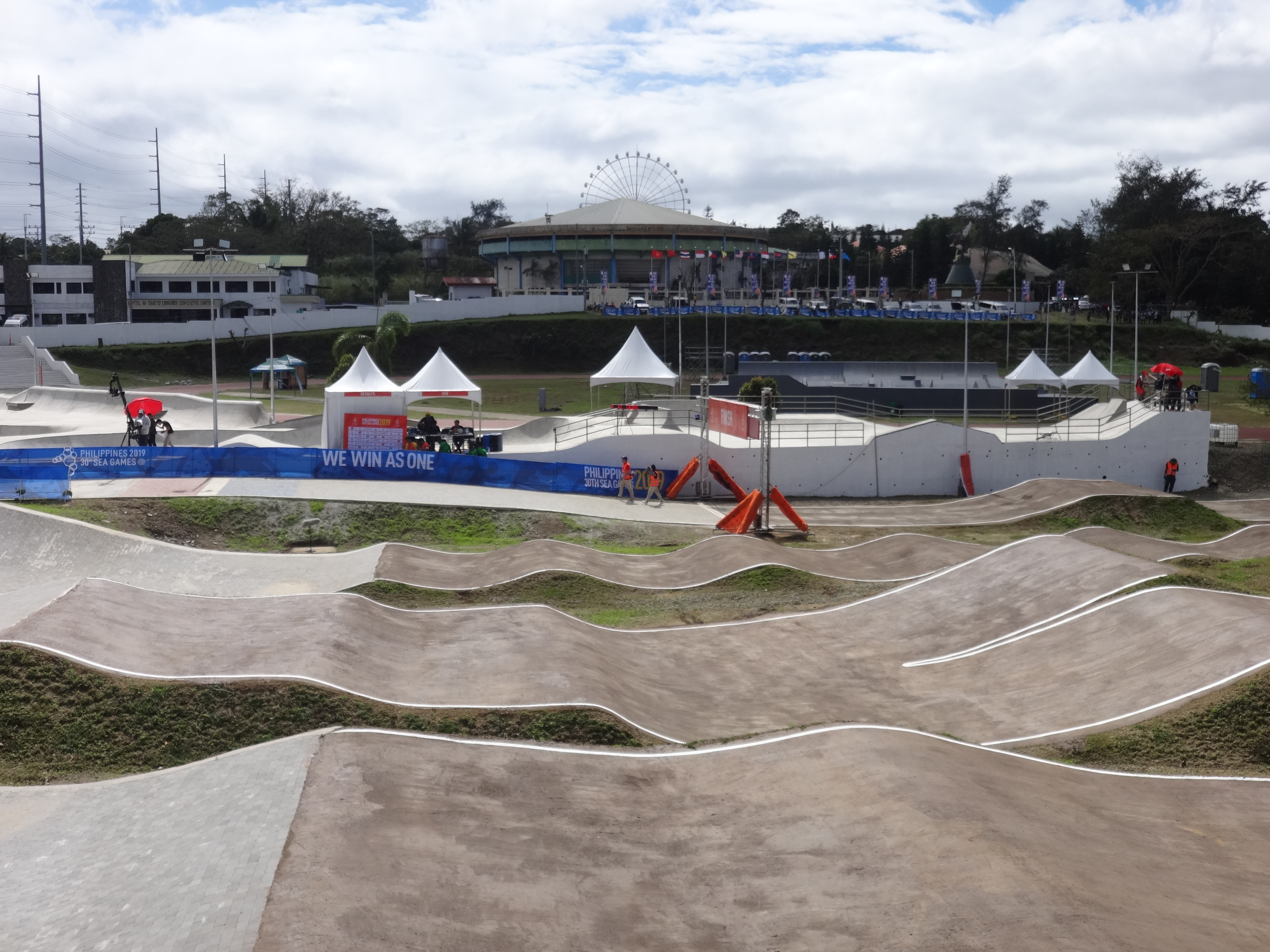
BMX track at the Tagaytay Skatepark.

Event	Gold	Silver	Bronze
Men's race	Komet Sukprasert; Thailand	Daniel Caluag; Philippines	Somkid Haratawan; Thailand
Men's time trial	Komet Sukprasert; Thailand	Toni Syarifudin; Indonesia	Sittichok Kaewsrikhao; Thailand
Men's freestyle flat land	Pakphum Poosa-Art; Thailand	Chutchalerm Chaiwirotwit; Thailand	Sheikh Muhammad Taslim Shaikh Mohd Raziff; Malaysia

=== Mountain biking ===
Event	Gold	Silver	Bronze
Men's downhill	John Derick Farr; Philippines	Eleazar Barba Jr. Philippines	Andy Prayoga; Indonesia
Men's cross-country	Keerati Sukprasart; Thailand	Niño Surban; Philippines	Edmhel John Flores; Philippines
Women's downhill	Lea Denise Belgira; Philippines	Tiara Andini Prastika; Indonesia	Vipavee Deekaballes; Thailand
Women's cross-country	Đinh Thị Như Quỳnh; Vietnam	Cà Thị Thơm; Vietnam	Avegail Rombaon; Philippines

=== Road cycling ===
Event	Gold	Silver	Bronze
Men's time trial	Aiman Cahyadi; Indonesia	Thanakhan Chaiyasombat; Thailand	Goh Choon Huat; Singapore
Men's team time trial	Thailand; Turakit Boonratanathanakorn; Navuti Liphongyu; Peerapol Chawchiangkwang; Sarawut Sirironnachai	Indonesia; Aiman Cahyadi; Muhammad Abdurrohman; Odie Setiawan; Robin Manullang	Philippines; Jhon Mark Camingao; Jan Paul Morales; Ronald Oranza; George Oconer
Men's road race	Sarawut Sirironnachai; Thailand	Ariya Phounsavath; Laos	Goh Choon Huat; Singapore
Men's team road race	Thailand; Turakit Boonratanathanakorn; Thanakhan Chaiyasombat; Navuti Liphongyu; Peerapol Chawchiangkwang; Sarawut Sirironnachai	Indonesia; Aiman Cahyadi; Jamalidin Novardianto; Muhammad Abdurrohman; Odie Setiawan; Robin Manullang	Philippines; Jonel Carcueva; El Joshua Cariño; Marcelo Felipe; Ismael Grospe Jr. Junrey Navarra
Women's time trial	Jermyn Prado; Philippines	Luo Yiwei; Singapore	Phetdarin Somrat; Thailand
Women's road race	Nguyễn Thị Thật; Vietnam	Jermyn Prado; Philippines	Ayustina Delia Priatna; Indonesia
