= Thai National Road Championships =

National road cycling championships in Thailand

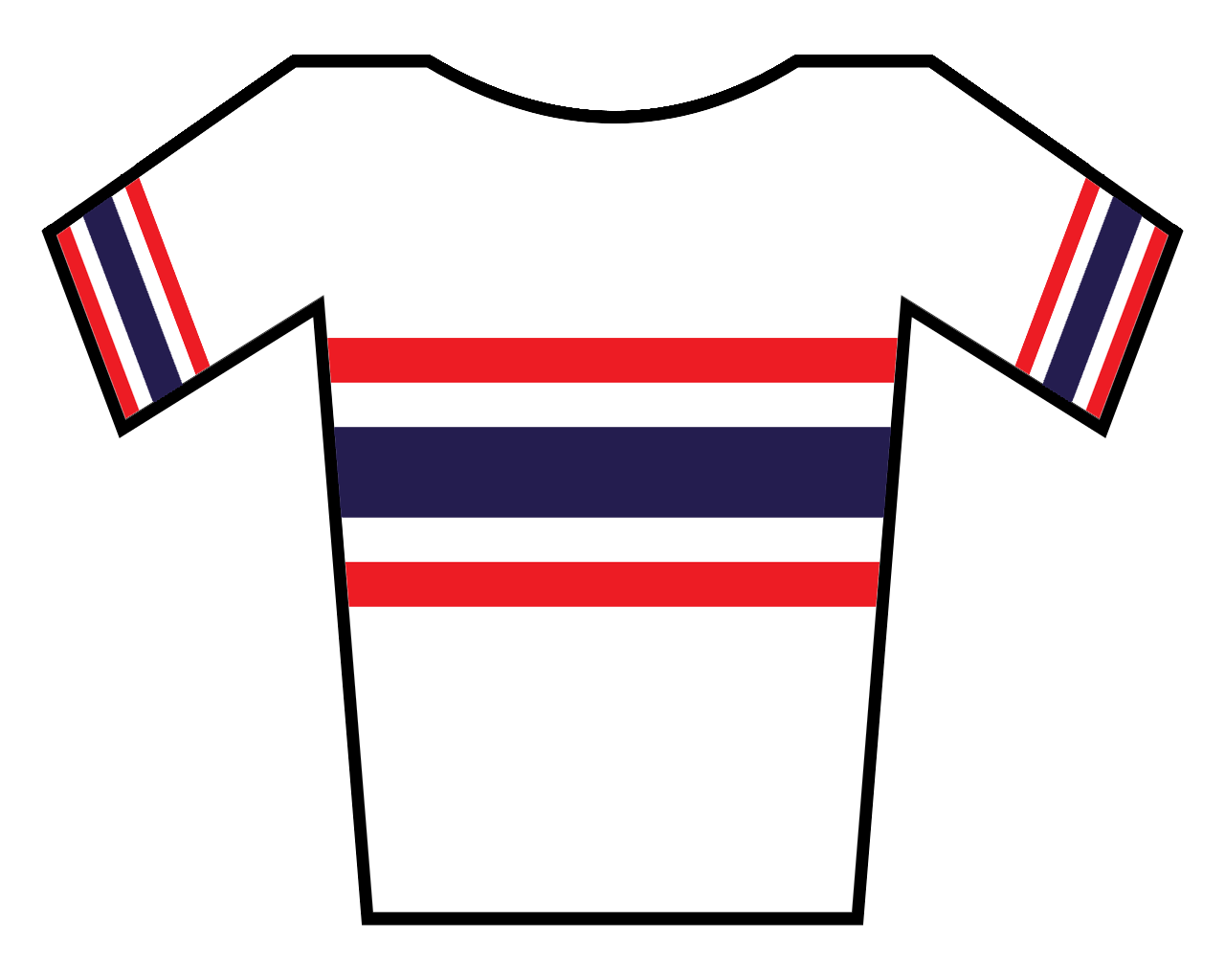

Race details
- Date: June
- Discipline: Road
- Type: One-day race

The Thai National Road Championships are held annually to decide the cycling champions in both the road race and time trial discipline, across various categories.

== Men ==
=== Road race ===
Year	Winner	Second	Third
2011	Saree Ruangsiri	Jatupoom Lekawat	Jittipong Trongkamnueng
2013	Navuti Liphongyu	Yutthana Dangdee	Peerapol Chawchiangkwang
2014	Peerapol Chawchiangkwang	Kritsada Changpad	Puchong Saiudomsin
2015	Kritsada Changpad	Peerapol Chawchiangkwang	Chirapon Tangprasert
2019	Jetsada Janluang	Nattapol Jumchat	Patompob Phonarjthan
2020	Sakchai Phodingam	Peerapol Chawchiangkwang	Thanakhan Chaiyasombat
2021	Sarawut Sirironnachai	Peerapol Chawchiangkwang	Thanakhan Chaiyasombat
2022	Jetsada Janluang	Sarawut Sirironnachai	Patompob Phonarjthan
2023	Noppachai Klahan	Sarawut Sirironnachai	Peerapol Chawchiangkwang

=== Time trial ===
Year	Winner	Second	Third
2014	Puchong Saiudomsin	Navuti Liphongyu	Turakit Boonratanathanakorn
2015	Navuti Liphongyu	Peerapong Ladngern	Pongsathon Woranet
2019	Peerapol Chawchiangkwang	Peerapong Ladngern	Sarawut Sirironnachai
2020	Sarawut Sirironnachai	Thanakhan Chaiyasombat	Peerapol Chawchiangkwang
2021	Peerapol Chawchiangkwang	Sarawut Sirironnachai	Peerapong Ladngern
2022	Peerapol Chawchiangkwang	Peerapong Ladngern	Yuttana Mano
2023	Peerapol Chawchiangkwang	Sarawut Sirironnachai	Thanakhan Chaiyasombat

== Women ==
Year	Road race	Time trial
2011	Panwaraporn Boonsawat	
2013	Panwaraporn Boonsawat	
2014	Supaksorn Nuntana	Phetdarin Somrat
2015	Jutatip Maneephan	Jutatip Maneephan
2019	Jutatip Maneephan	
2020	Jutatip Maneephan	Phetdarin Somrat
2021	Supaksorn Nuntana	Phetdarin Somrat
2022	Jutatip Maneephan	Phetdarin Somrat
2023	Chaniporn Batriya	Chaniporn Batriya
