= Cycling at the 2021 SEA Games =

- Location: Hòa Bình, Vietnam
- Dates: 14–22 May 2022

The cycling competition at the 2021 SEA Games took place in Hòa Bình, Vietnam from 14 to 17 May 2022 (mountain biking) and 19 to 22 May 2022 (road cycling). Only mountain biking and road race were featured in this edition.

== Medal table ==
* Host nation (Vietnam)

Rank	Nation	Gold	Silver	Bronze	Total
1	Vietnam*	4	2	0	6
2	Indonesia	3	4	1	8
3	Thailand	3	2	4	9
4	Malaysia	2	3	3	8
5	Singapore	0	1	1	2
6	Philippines	0	0	3	3
Totals (6 entries)		12	12	12	36

== Medalists ==
=== Mountain biking ===
Event	Gold	Silver	Bronze
Men's cross country	Zaenal Fanani; Indonesia	Ihza Muhammad; Indonesia	Jerico Rivera Cruz; Philippines
Women's cross country	Đinh Thị Như Quỳnh; Vietnam	Nur Assyira Zainal Abidin; Malaysia	Natahsya Soon; Malaysia
Men's downhill	Methasit Boonsane; Thailand	Andy Prayoga; Indonesia	John Derick Farr; Philippines
Women's downhill	Tiara Andini Prastika; Indonesia	Vipavee Deekaballes; Thailand	Naomi Gardoce Mapanao; Philippines
Mixed team cross country	Malaysia; Nur Assyira Zainal Abidin; Natahsya Soon; Ahmad Syazrin Awang Ilah; Zulfikri Zulkifli	Vietnam; Đinh Văn Linh; Bùi Văn Nhất; Đinh Thị Như Quỳnh; Cà Thị Thơm	Thailand; Supuksorn Nuntana; Warinthorn Phetpraphan; Phunsiri Sirimongkhon; Keerati Sukprasart

=== Road cycling ===
Event	Gold	Silver	Bronze
Men's road race	Nur Aiman Mohd Zariff; Malaysia	Aiman Cahyadi; Indonesia	Navuti Liphongyu; Thailand
Women's road race	Nguyễn Thị Thật; Vietnam	Nur Aisyah Mohamad Zubir; Malaysia	Agustina Delia Priatna; Indonesia
Men's criterium	Quàng Văn Cường; Vietnam	Sarawut Sirironnachai; Thailand	Boon Kiak Yeo; Singapore
Women's criterium	Jutatip Maneephan; Thailand	Nguyễn Thị Thật; Vietnam	Nur Aisyah Mohamad Zubir; Malaysia
Men's time trial	Peerapol Chawchiangkwang; Thailand	Aiman Cahyadi; Indonesia	Nur Aiman Rosli; Malaysia
Women's time trial	Agustina Delia Priatna; Indonesia	Luo Yi Wei; Singapore	Phetdarin Somrat; Thailand
Women's team road race	Vietnam; Nguyễn Thị Thật; Bùi Thị Quỳnh; Nguyễn Thị Kim Cương; Nguyễn Thị Thu Mai	Malaysia; Nor Aisyah Munirah Chek Ramli; Siti Nur Adibah Akma; Jupha Somnet; Nur Aisyah Mohamad Zubir	Thailand; Jutatip Maneephan; Chaniporn Batriya; Phetdarin Somrat
