= Tiara Andini Prastika =

Indonesian cyclist

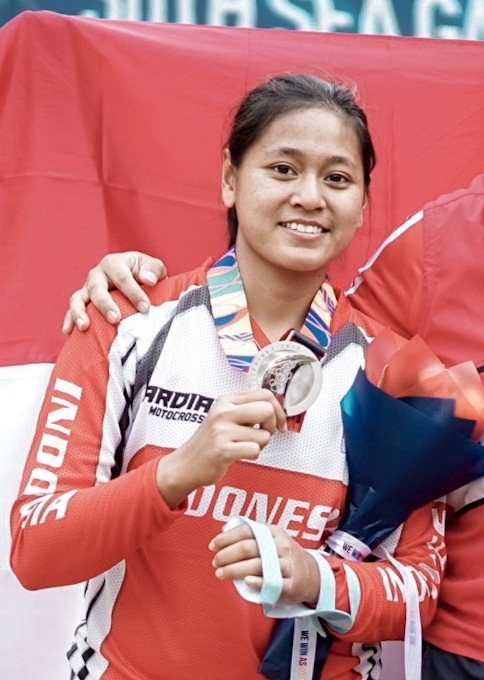

Personal information
- Born: 22 March 1996 (age 30) Semarang, Indonesia

Cycling career
- Sport: Cycling
Medal record
Women's cycling
Representing Indonesia
Asian Games
| Gold medal – first place | 2018 Jakarta–Palembang | downhill |
SEA Games
| Gold medal – first place | 2021 Vietnam | downhill |
| Silver medal – second place | 2019 Philippines | downhill |

Tiara Andini Prastika (born 22 March 1996) is an Indonesian mountain cyclist. She represented Indonesia at the 2018 Asian Games and clinched an historic gold medal for Indonesia in the women's downhill cycling event. With this achievement, she also became the first Indonesian female cyclist to claim a gold medal in the mountain bike event in an Asian Games event.

== Awards and nominations ==
| Award | Year | Category | Result | Ref. |
|---|---|---|---|---|
| Indonesian Sport Awards | 2018 | Favorite Female Athlete | Nominated | |
