= Thanawut Sanikwathi =

Thai cyclist

Personal information
- Full name: Thanawut Sanikwathi
- Born: 13 June 1993 (age 33) Nakhon Si Thammarat, Thailand

Cycling career
- Sport: Cycling
- Current team: Thailand Continental Cycling Team
- Discipline: Road
- Role: Rider

Professional team
- 2017–: Thailand Continental Cycling Team

Thanawut Sanikwathi (born 13 June 1993) is a Thai cyclist, who currently rides for UCI Continental team Thailand Continental Cycling Team.

== Major results ==
2015
5th Road race, Southeast Asian Games
2017
1st Stage 2 Tour of Thailand
2020
1st Stage 1 Tour of Thailand
