= Cycling at the 2022 Asian Games – Men's BMX racing =

International sporting competition

Men's racing at the 2022 Asian Games
- Venue: Chun'an Jieshou Sports Centre
- Date: 1 October 2023
- Competitors: 12 from 7 nations

Medalists
gold medal	Asuma Nakai	Japan
silver medal	Komet Sukprasert	Thailand
bronze medal	Patrick Coo	Philippines

The men's BMX racing competition at the 2022 Asian Games in Hangzhou was held on 1 October 2023 at the Chun'an Jieshou Sports Centre.

== Schedule ==
All times are China Standard Time (UTC+08:00)

Date	Time	Event
Sunday, 1 October 2023	09:15	Time trial
Sunday, 1 October 2023	09:54	Motos
Sunday, 1 October 2023	11:30	Final

== Results ==
=== Time trial ===
Rank	Athlete	Time
1	Komet Sukprasert (THA)	37.865
2	Chen Yucheng (CHN)	39.091
3	Asuma Nakai (JPN)	39.323
4	Lin Haochao (CHN)	39.512
5	Patrick Coo (PHI)	40.073
6	Daniel Caluag (PHI)	40.163
7	Fasya Ahsana Rifki (INA)	40.931
8	I Gusti Bagus Saputra (INA)	41.416
9	Yoon Joon-soo (KOR)	41.724
10	Apisit Jaiyoo (THA)	42.506
11	Mas Ridzwan (SGP)	45.155
12	Park Dong-yeong (KOR)	2:21.499

=== Motos ===
==== Heat 1 ====
Rank	Athlete	Run 1		Run 2		Run 3		Total
Rank	Athlete	Time	Pts	Time	Pts	Time	Pts	Total
1	Komet Sukprasert (THA)	38.115	1	38.386	1	38.563	1	3
2	Patrick Coo (PHI)	1:16.965	6	39.624	2	39.870	2	10
3	Yoon Joon-soo (KOR)	42.825	2	40.976	4	40.773	4	10
4	Lin Haochao (CHN)	44.209	5	40.687	3	40.660	3	11
5	Park Dong-yeong (KOR)	43.251	3	41.262	5	41.295	5	13
6	I Gusti Bagus Saputra (INA)	43.482	4	42.867	6	42.429	6	16

==== Heat 2 ====
Rank	Athlete	Run 1		Run 2		Run 3		Total
Rank	Athlete	Time	Pts	Time	Pts	Time	Pts	Total
1	Asuma Nakai (JPN)	38.725	1	38.968	1	37.271	1	3
2	Chen Yucheng (CHN)	40.145	3	39.290	2	38.089	2	7
3	Fasya Ahsana Rifki (INA)	40.522	4	39.993	3	39.971	3	10
4	Daniel Caluag (PHI)	40.069	2	40.405	4	41.662	6	12
5	Mas Ridzwan (SGP)	41.087	5	47.155	6	41.305	4	15
6	Apisit Jaiyoo (THA)	41.201	6	41.054	5	41.650	5	16

=== Final ===
Rank	Athlete	Time
1st place, gold medalist(s)	Asuma Nakai (JPN)	37.542
2nd place, silver medalist(s)	Komet Sukprasert (THA)	38.478
3rd place, bronze medalist(s)	Patrick Coo (PHI)	39.076
4	Lin Haochao (CHN)	39.537
5	Chen Yucheng (CHN)	40.404
6	Daniel Caluag (PHI)	40.433
7	Yoon Joon-soo (KOR)	40.769
8	Fasya Ahsana Rifki (INA)	1:39.409
