= Komet Sukprasert =

Thai BMX rider (born 2000)

Personal information
- Born: 12 June 2000 (age 26)

Cycling career
- Sport: Cycling
- Discipline: BMX racing
Medal record
Representing Thailand
Men's BMX racing
Asian Games
Silver medal – second place	2022 Hangzhou	BMX racing
SEA Games
Gold medal – first place	2019 Philippines	BMX racing
Gold medal – first place	2019 Philippines	BMX time trial
Gold medal – first place	2025 Thailand	BMX racing
Gold medal – first place	2025 Thailand	BMX time trial

Komet Sukprasert (Thai: โกเมธ สุขประเสริฐ; born 12 June 2000) is a Thai BMX racer. A multiple-time Asian champion and medalist at the 2022 Asian Games, he was selected for the 2024 Summer Olympics.

== Career ==
He won gold at the 2019 SEA Games in Tagaytay, Philippines, in both the BMX race and BMX time trial.

He won the ACC BMX champion for the first time in August 2022 in Nilai, Malaysia, to also become his country's first Asian Champion in the discipline. He won a silver medal at the delayed 2022 Asian Games in Hangzhou, China in 2023.

He won his third consecutive Asian title winning the men's elite event of the Asian BMX Continental Championships in 2024. He qualified for the 2024 Paris Olympic Games. He was subsequently selected to compete at the 2024 Summer Olympics.
