= Phetdarin Somrat =

Thai cyclist (born 1995)

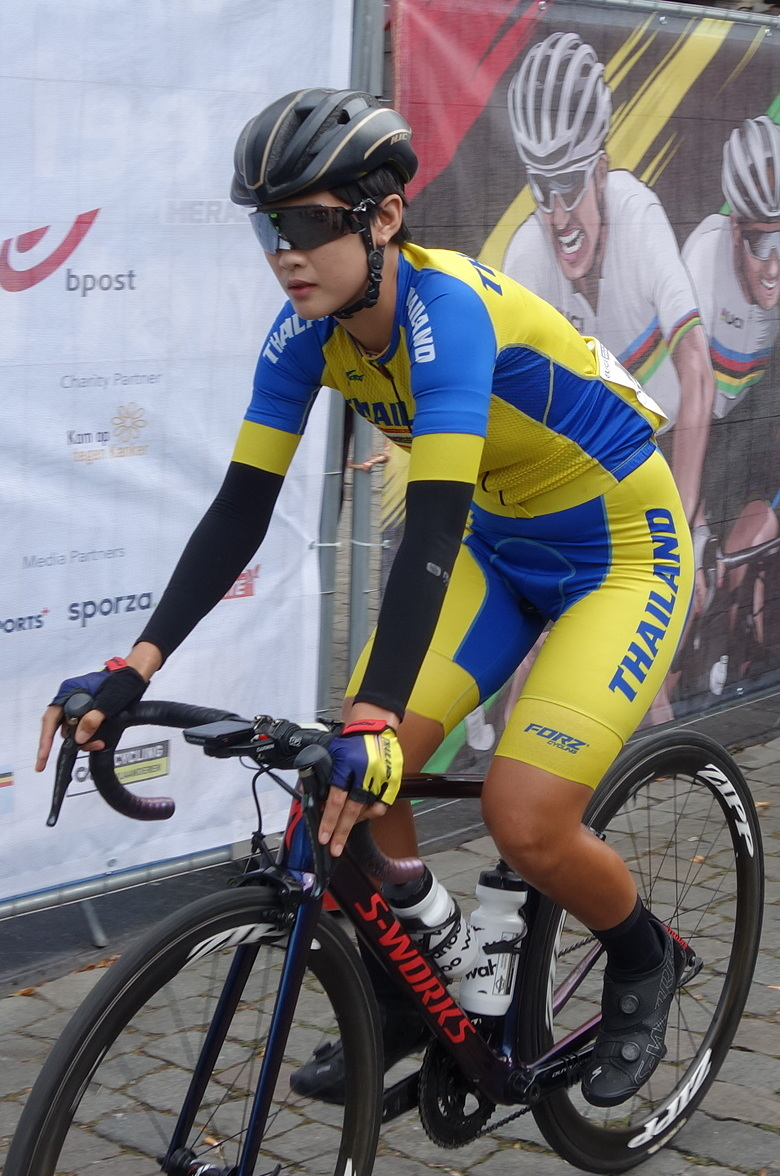
- Somrat at the 2021 World Championships

Personal information
- Full name: Phetdarin Jaruwan Somrat
- Born: 6 June 1995 (age 31) Chiang Mai, Thailand

Cycling career
- Sport: Cycling
- Current team: Thailand Women's Cycling Team
- Discipline: Road
- Role: Rider

Amateur team
- 2018: World Cycling Centre

Professional teams
- 2017: Thailand Women's Cycling Team
- 2019–: Thailand Women's Cycling Team

Major wins
- One day races & Classics National Time Trial Championships (2014, 2020)

Phetdarin Jaruwan Somrat (Thai: เพชรดารินทร์ สมราช; born 6 June 1995) is a Thai professional racing cyclist, who currently rides for UCI Women's Continental Team Thailand Women's Cycling Team. She rode in the women's road race at the 2016 UCI Road World Championships, but she did not finish the race.

== Major results ==
2013
1st Stage 2 Princess Maha Chakri Sirindhon's Cup Tour of Thailand
Asian Junior Road Championships

5th Road race
6th Time trial

2014
National Road Championships

1st Time trial
3rd Road race

2015
7th Overall The Princess Maha Chackri Sirindhon's Cup
2016
4th Overall Tour of Thailand
10th Road race, Asian Road Championships
2017
1st Overall Princess Maha Chakri Sirindhon's Cup Tour of Thailand

1st Asian rider classification
1st Stage 3

Asian Under-23 Road Championships

5th Road race
5th Time trial

9th Road race, Southeast Asian Games
2018
Asian Games

5th Time trial
9th Road race

8th Time trial, Asian Road Championships
2019
3rd Time trial, Southeast Asian Games
8th Time trial, Asian Road Championships
2020
1st Time trial, National Road Championships
4th Overall Tour of Thailand
2021
National Road Championships

1st Time trial
2nd Road race

2022
1st Overall Princess Maha Chakri Sirindhon's Cup Tour of Thailand

1st Mountains classification
1st Stage 2

National Road Championships

1st Time trial
10th Road race

3rd Time trial, SEA Games
7th Time trial, Asian Road Championships
2023
National Road Championships

2nd Time trial
2nd Road race

9th Time trial, Asian Road Championships
2024
National Road Championships

1st Time trial
1st Road race

6th Time trial, Asian Road Championships
2025
National Road Championships

1st Time trial
1st Road race

7th Time trial, Asian Road Championships
