= Turakit Boonratanathanakorn =

Thai cyclist (born 1989)

Personal information
- Full name: Turakit Boonratanathanakorn; Thai: ธุรกิจ บุญรัตนธนากร
- Born: 18 March 1989 (age 37)

Cycling career
- Sport: Cycling
- Current team: Thailand Continental Cycling Team
- Disciplines: Track; Road
- Role: Rider
- Rider type: Baroudeur

Professional team
- 2017–: Thailand Continental Cycling Team

Turakit Boonratanathanakorn (Thai: ธุรกิจ บุญรัตนธนากร; born 18 March 1989) is a Thai cyclist, who currently rides for UCI Continental team Thailand Continental Cycling Team.

At the 2009 UCI Road World Championships he competed in the under-23 time trial. On the track he competed in the scratch event at the 2011 UCI Track Cycling World Championships but did not finish the race.

== Major results ==
=== Road ===
2008
7th Overall Tour of Thailand
2009
Asian Road Championships

1st Under-23 road race
9th Road race

2012
10th Overall Tour de Brunei
10th Overall Tour of Thailand
2013
1st Stage 4 Tour of Thailand
2nd Team time trial, Southeast Asian Games
2014
3rd Time trial, National Road Championships
2015
2nd Time trial, Southeast Asian Games
2017
Southeast Asian Games

2nd Team time trial
4th Road race

2018
8th Overall Tour of Thailand
9th Time trial, Asian Games
2019
1st Team time trial, Southeast Asian Games
2020
10th Overall Tour of Thailand

=== Track ===
2007
2nd Team pursuit, Southeast Asian Games
2010
3rd Scratch, Asian Track Championships
2011
3rd Scratch, Asian Track Championships
2012
2nd Scratch, Asian Track Championships
2017
Southeast Asian Games

2nd Team pursuit
2nd Scratch

3rd Team pursuit, Asian Indoor and Martial Arts Games
