= Navuti Liphongyu =

Thai cyclist (born 1991)

Personal information
- Full name: Navuti Liphongyu; Thai: นวุติ ลี้พงษ์อยู่
- Born: 18 October 1991 (age 34) Phayao, Thailand
- Height: 1.71 m (5 ft 7 in)
- Weight: 61 kg (134 lb)

Cycling career
- Sport: Cycling
- Discipline: Road
- Role: Rider

Professional team
- 2017–2022: Thailand Continental Cycling Team

Navuti Liphongyu (Thai: นวุติ ลี้พงษ์อยู่; born 18 October 1991) is a Thai cyclist, who most recently rode for UCI Continental team Thailand Continental Cycling Team.

== Major results ==
2011
Southeast Asian Games

1st Team time trial
2nd Team road race
5th Road race

5th Overall Tour de Brunei
8th Overall Tour de East Java
2013
1st Road race, National Road Championships
Southeast Asian Games

2nd Team time trial
7th Road race

10th Overall Tour of Thailand
10th Overall Tour of Fuzhou
2014
2nd Time trial, National Road Championships
2015
1st Time trial, National Road Championships
6th Road race, Asian Road Championships
8th Time trial, Southeast Asian Games
2017
Southeast Asian Games

1st Road race
2nd Team time trial
2nd Team pursuit

3rd Team pursuit, Asian Indoor and Martial Arts Games
2018
3rd Road race, Asian Games
2019
Southeast Asian Games

1st Team road race
1st Team time trial

2022
3rd Road race, Southeast Asian Games
