= Sarawut Sirironnachai =

Thai cyclist (born 1992)

Personal information
- Full name: Sarawut Sirironnachai
- Born: 23 August 1992 (age 34) Nakhon Si Thammarat, Thailand
- Height: 1.75 m (5 ft 9 in)
- Weight: 61 kg (134 lb)

Cycling career
- Sport: Cycling
- Current team: Thailand Continental Cycling Team
- Discipline: Road
- Role: Rider

Amateur team
- 2012–2013: World Cycling Centre

Professional team
- 2017–: Thailand Continental Cycling Team

Sarawut Sirironnachai (born 23 August 1992) is a Thai cyclist, who currently rides for UCI Continental team Thailand Continental Cycling Team.

== Major results ==
2011
1st Team time trial, Southeast Asian Games
2013
Southeast Asian Games

1st Team time trial
6th Road race

2018
6th Overall Tour of Thailand
9th Overall Tour of Indonesia
2019
Southeast Asian Games

1st Road race
1st Team road race
1st Team time trial

1st Stage 5 Tour of Thailand
7th Overall Tour de Korea
2020
National Road Championships

1st Time trial
7th Road race

2nd Overall Tour of Thailand

1st Points classification
1st Mountains classification
1st Stages 3 & 4

2021
National Road Championships

1st Road race
2nd Time trial

3rd Overall Tour of Thailand

1st Stage 3

2022
National Road Championships

2nd Road race
5th Time trial

Southeast Asian Games

2nd Criterium
6th Road race

6th Overall Tour of Iran
2023
Tour of Thailand

1st, Stage 6

National Road Championships

2nd Road race
2nd Time trial
