= Cambodia Bay Cycling Tour =

Race details
- Date: January
- Region: Cambodia
- Discipline: Road
- Competition: UCI Asia Tour
- Type: Stage race

History
- First edition: 2020
- Editions: 1 (as of 2020)
- First winner: Ariya Phounsavath (LAO)
- Most wins: Ariya Phounsavath (LAO) (1 win)
- Most recent: Ariya Phounsavath (LAO)

The Cambodia Bay Cycling Tour is an annual professional road bicycle racing stage race held in Cambodia since 2020. The race is part of the UCI Asia Tour and was classified by the International Cycling Union (UCI) as a 2.2 category race. The first edition was won by Laotian rider Ariya Phounsavath.

== Winners ==
| Year | Country | Rider | Team |
|---|---|---|---|
| 2020 | Laos | Ariya Phounsavath | Laos National Team |

== Jerseys ==
The leader of the overall general classification receives a yellow jersey. There are also three other classifications. The winner of the points classification (sprints) wears a green jersey, a red jersey for the winner of the mountain classification and a white jersey for the best young rider.
