= Thanakhan Chaiyasombat =

Thai cyclist (born 1999)

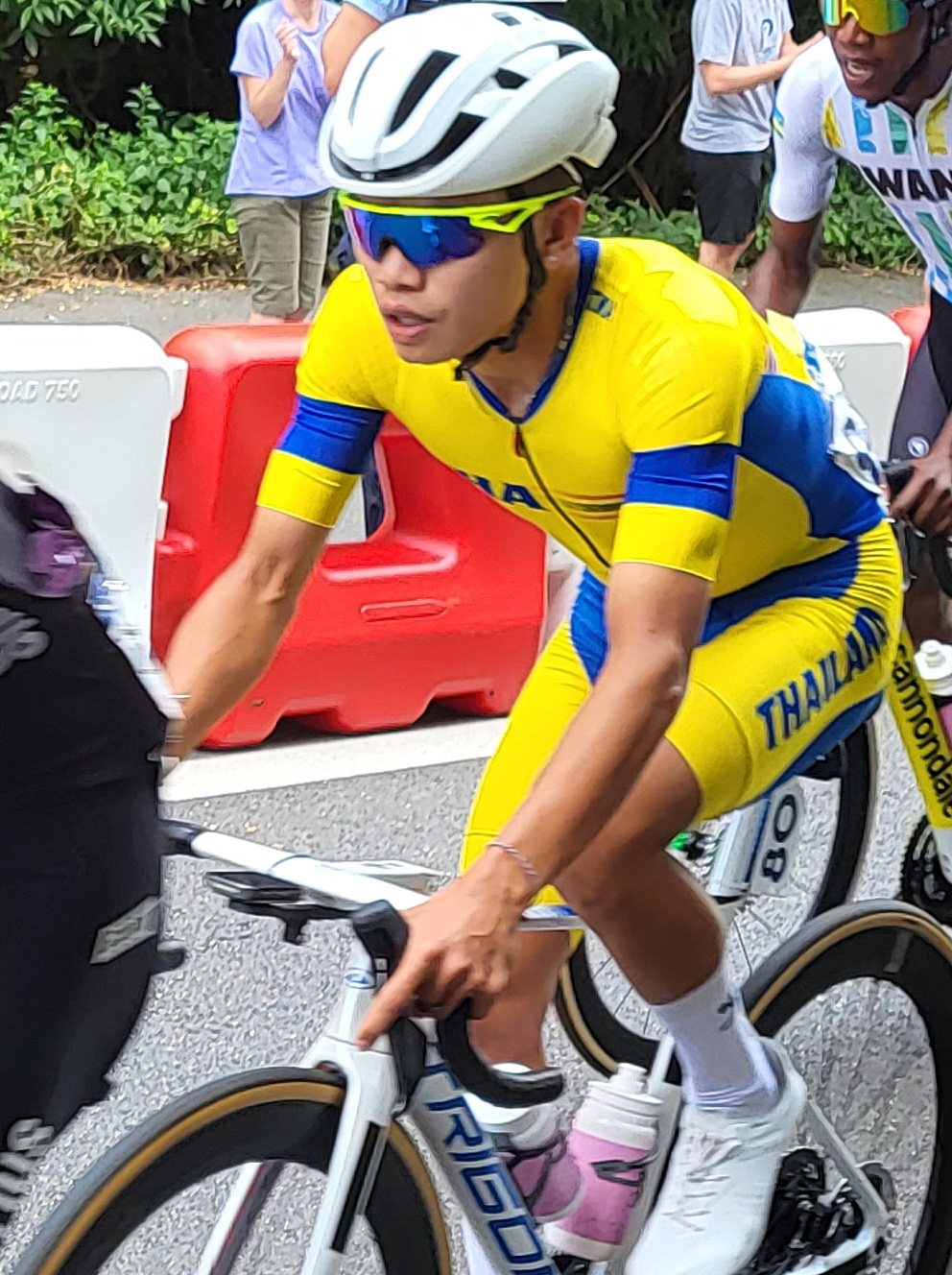
- Chaiyasombat in Men's Road Race at the Paris 2024 Olympics

Personal information
- Full name: Thanakhan Chaiyasombat
- Born: 26 June 1999 (age 27)
- Height: 1.7 m (5 ft 7 in)
- Weight: 58 kg (128 lb)

Cycling career
- Sport: Cycling
- Current team: Thailand Continental Cycling Team
- Discipline: Road
- Role: Rider

Professional team
- 2018–: Thailand Continental Cycling Team

Thanakhan Chaiyasombat (Thai: ธนาคาร ไชยยาสมบัติ; born 26 June 1999) is a Thai cyclist who currently rides for the UCI Continental team Thailand Continental Cycling Team.

== Major results ==
2017
5th Time trial, Asian Junior Road Championships
2018
6th Overall Tour de Singkarak

1st Stage 4

7th Road race, Asian Games
2019
Southeast Asian Games

1st Team road race
2nd Time trial
5th Road race

6th Overall Tour de Singkarak
9th Time trial, Asian Under-23 Road Championships
2020
1st Time trial, National Under-23 Road Championships
National Road Championships

2nd Time trial
3rd Road race

6th Overall Tour of Thailand

1st Young rider classification

2021
1st Time trial, National Under-23 Road Championships
National Road Championships

3rd Road race
4th Time trial

2022
4th Time trial, National Road Championships
10th Overall Tour of Azerbaijan (Iran)
2023
National Road Championships

3rd Time trial
4th Road race

7th Overall Tour de Taiwan
8th Road race, SEA Games
2024
National Road Championships

1st Road race
1st Time trial
