= Ariya Phounsavath =

Laotian cyclist

Personal information
- Full name: Ariya Phounsavath
- Born: 1 March 1991 (age 35) Vientiane, Laos
- Height: 1.82 m (6 ft 0 in)
- Weight: 58 kg (128 lb)

Cycling career
- Sport: Cycling
- Current team: Roojai Insurance Winspace
- Discipline: Road
- Role: Rider

Amateur team
- 2016: CC Villeneuve Saint-Germain

Professional teams
- 2013: RTS Racing Team
- 2014–2015: CCN
- 2017: Nice Cycling Team
- 2017–2022: Thailand Continental Cycling Team
- 2023–: Roojai Online Insurance
Medal record
Representing Laos
Men's road bicycle racing
Southeast Asian Games
Gold medal – first place	2013 Naypyidaw	Individual road race
Silver medal – second place	2019 Philippines	Individual road race
Silver medal – second place	2025 Thailand	Individual time trial

Ariya Phounsavath (born 1 March 1991) is a Laotian cyclist, who currently rides for UCI Continental team Roojai Insurance Winspace. He rode in the road race at the 2016 Summer Olympics.

== Major results ==
2013
1st (gold) Road race, SEA Games
2014
2nd Melaka Chief Minister's Cup
3rd Taiwan KOM Challenge
5th Overall Tour de Filipinas

1st Mountains classification
1st Stage 4

2016
9th Paris–Chauny
2017
1st Overall HTV Cup
5th Overall Jelajah Malaysia
8th Overall Tour de Ijen
2018
1st Overall Tour de Indonesia

1st Mountains classification

3rd Overall Tour de Singkarak
2019
2nd (silver) Road race, SEA Games
10th Overall PRUride PH
2020
1st Overall Cambodia Bay Cycling Tour

1st Stage 1

2023
2nd Overall Tour of Sharjah
9th Overall New Zealand Cycle Classic
