= Cycling at the 2017 SEA Games =

- Venue: Nilai; Putrajaya
- Date: 21–29 August 2017

The cycling competitions at the 2017 SEA Games in Kuala Lumpur took place at Nilai and Putrajaya.

In 2017 edition, the competitions were featured in twenty events (men: 12 events & women: 8 events).

== Events ==
The following events were contested:

- BMX
- Road
  - Criterium
  - Mass start
  - Time trial (event for men)
- Track
  - Keirin
  - Omnium
  - Pursuit (all events for men)
  - Sprint
  - Scratch race (event for men)
  - Time trial

== Participation ==
=== Participating nations ===
- Brunei (7)
- Cambodia (7)
- Indonesia (25)
- Laos (4)
- Malaysia (33)
- Myanmar (5)
- Philippines (15)
- Singapore (16)
- Thailand (32)
- Vietnam (13)

== Medal summary ==
=== Medal table ===
* Host nation (Malaysia)

Rank	Nation	Gold	Silver	Bronze	Total
1	Malaysia*	13	10	3	26
2	Thailand	2	7	6	15
3	Indonesia	2	2	7	11
4	Vietnam	2	0	2	4
5	Singapore	1	1	1	3
6	Philippines	0	0	1	1
Totals (6 entries)		20	20	20	60

=== BMX events ===
Event	Gold	Silver	Bronze
Men	I Gusti Bagus Saputra; Indonesia	Nonthakon Inkhokshong; Thailand	Daniel Caluag; Philippines
Women	Elga Kharisma Novanda; Indonesia	Chutikan Kitwanitsathian; Thailand	Noor Quraataina Mamat; Malaysia

=== Road events ===
Event	Gold	Silver	Bronze
Men's criterium	Mohamed Harrif Salleh; Malaysia	Thanawut Sanikwathi; Thailand	Mohamed Zamri Salleh; Malaysia
Women's criterium	Nguyễn Thị Thật; Vietnam	Jupha Somnet; Malaysia	Jutatip Maneephan; Thailand
Men's team time trial	Malaysia; Muhammad Ameen Ahmad Kamal; Muhammad Ameer Ahmad Kamal; Muhammad Fauzan Ahmad Lutfi; Nik Mohd Azwan Zulkifle	Thailand; Navuti Liphongyu; Peerapol Chawchiangkwang; Phuchong Saiudomsin; Turakit Boonratanathanakorn	Vietnam; Huỳnh Thanh Tùng; Mai Nguyễn Hưng; Nguyễn Trường Tài; Trịnh Đức Tâm
Men's road race	Navuti Liphongyu; Thailand	Mohd Shahrul Mat Amin; Malaysia	Mai Nguyễn Hưng; Vietnam
Women's road race	Nguyễn Thị Thật; Vietnam	Jupha Somnet; Malaysia	Ayustina Delia Priatna; Indonesia

=== Track events ===
Event	Gold	Silver	Bronze
Men's Keirin	Azizulhasni Awang; Malaysia	Mohd Shariz Efendi Shahrin; Malaysia	Muhammad Nur Fathoni; Indonesia
Women's Keirin	Fatehah Mustapa; Malaysia	Farina Shawati Adnan; Malaysia	Watinee Luekajorn; Thailand
Men's Omnium	Calvin Sim Teck Kwang; Singapore	Sofian Nabil Omar Bakri; Malaysia	Nandra Eko Wahyudi; Indonesia
Women's Omnium	Jutatip Maneephan; Thailand	Luo Yiwei; Singapore	Jupha Somnet; Malaysia
Men's pursuit	Eiman Firdaus Zamri; Malaysia	Mohamad Nur Aiman Zariff; Malaysia	Sarawut Sirironnachai; Thailand
Men's team pursuit	Malaysia; Eiman Firdaus Zamri; Irwandie Lakasek; Mohamad Nur Aiman Zariff; Muhamad Afiq Huzni Othman	Thailand; Sarawut Sirironnachai; Yuttana Mano; Turakit Boonratanathanakorn; Navuti Liphongyu	Indonesia; Aiman Cahyadi; Eko Bayu Nurhidayat; Fatahillah Abdullah; Robin Manullang
Men's scratch race	Irwandie Lakasek; Malaysia	Turakit Boonratanathanakorn; Thailand	Thanawut Sanikwathi; Thailand
Men's sprint	Azizulhasni Awang; Malaysia	Shah Firdaus Sahrom; Malaysia	Jaturong Niwanti; Thailand
Women's sprint	Fatehah Mustapa; Malaysia	Farina Shawati Adnan; Malaysia	Uyun Muzizah; Indonesia
Men's team sprint	Malaysia; Mohd Shariz Efendi Shahrin; Muhammad Fadhil Zonis; Mohd Khairil Nizam Rasol	Thailand; Pongthep Tapimay; Satjakul Sianglam; Worayut Kapunya	Indonesia; Muhammad Nur Fathoni; Puguh Admadi; Reno Yudha Sansoko
Women's team sprint	Malaysia; Farina Shawati Adnan; Fatehah Mustapa	Indonesia; Crismonita Dwi Putri; Santia Tri Kusuma	Thailand; Chaniporn Batriya; Pannaray Rasee
Men's time trial (1 kilometres)	Muhammad Fadhil Zonis; Malaysia	Shah Firdaus Sahrom; Malaysia	Mohamed Elyas Yusoff; Singapore
Women's time trial (500 metres)	Fatehah Mustapa; Malaysia	Crismonita Dwi Putri; Indonesia	Santia Tri Kusuma; Indonesia

== See also ==
- Cycling at the 2017 ASEAN Para Games
