= Tour de Indonesia =

Annual professional road bicycle racing stage race held in Java, Indonesia

Race details
- Date: January (2018)
- Region: Java, Indonesia
- Discipline: Road
- Competition: UCI Asia Tour 2.1
- Type: Stage race
- Web site: tour.telkomspeedy.com

History
- First edition: 2004
- Editions: 9 (as of 2019)
- First winner: Nathan Dahlberg (NZL)
- Most wins: No repeat winners
- Most recent: Thomas Lebas (FRA)

The Tour de Indonesia is an annual professional road bicycle racing stage race held in Java, Indonesia since 2004. The race is sanctioned by the International Cycling Union (UCI) as a 2.1 category race as part of the UCI Asia Tour.

== History ==
Several regions in Indonesia organize annual international cycling races of UCI 2.2 status, such as Tour de Singkarak in West Sumatra, Tour de Ijen Banyuwangi in East Java, Tour de Siak in Riau, Tour de Celebes in Central Sulawesi, Tour de Lombok Mandalika in West Nusa Tenggara, Tour de Malvccas in Maluku, and Tour de Flores as well as Tour de Timor in East Nusa Tenggara. But Tour de Indonesia is the only one which achieved UCI 2.1 status.

The main sponsor of the then-named Tour d'Indonesia from 2003 to 2006 was Dji Sam Soe 234, a cigarette brand produced by Philip Morris International also called Philip Morris Racing. In 2007 Tour d'Indonesia was cancelled due to lack of funding and failure to attract a sponsor. In 2008 the tour was held again sponsored by Speedy broadband access of Telkom. Until the 2010 edition Speedy remained as official sponsor of this bicycle race.

The race was not held between 2012 and 2017, before being revived in 2018 as a 2.1 category race compared to the 2.2 it was before.

== Past winners ==
Year	Country	Rider	Team
2004	New Zealand	Nathan Dahlberg	Greenfield Fresh Milk
2005	Iran	Hossein Askari	Giant Asia Racing Team
2006	Ireland	David McCann	Giant Asia Racing Team
2007	No race		
2008	Iran	Ghader Mizbani	Tabriz Petrochemical Team
2009	Iran	Mehdi Sohrabi	Tabriz Petrochemical Team
2010	Indonesia	Herwin Jaya	Polygon Sweet Nice
2011	Australia	Eric Sheppard	Plan B Racing Team
2012–2017	No race		
2018	Laos	Ariya Phounsavath	Thailand Continental Cycling Team
2019	France	Thomas Lebas	Kinan Cycling Team
