= 2026 Tour de Taiwan =

Cycling race

2026 UCI Asia Tour

Race details
- Dates: 15-19 March 2026
- Stages: 5
- Distance: 635.2 km (394.7 mi)
- Winning time: 13h 37' 38"

Results
Jersey awarded to the overall winner	Winner	Matys Grisel (FRA)	(Lotto–Intermarché)
	Second	Matthew Fox (AUS)	(Lotto–Intermarché)
	Third	Jordi López (ESP)	(Euskaltel–Euskadi)
Jersey awarded to the points classification winner	Points	Paul Hennequin (FRA)	(Euskaltel–Euskadi)
Jersey awarded to the mountains classification winner	Mountains	Yuhi Todome (JPN)	(Aisan Racing Team)
	Team	(Spain) Euskaltel–Euskadi	

The 2026 Tour de Taiwan was the 22nd edition of the Tour de Taiwan road cycling stage race, since being recognized as a UCI-level race in 2005. It is part of the 2026 UCI Asia Tour as a category 2.1 race. The race began on the 15th of March in Taipei City and finished on the 19th of March in Liyu Lake Visitor Center.

== Teams ==
One UCI WorldTeam, five UCI ProTeams, thirteen UCI Continental teams and two national teams make up the twenty-two teams that participated in the race.

UCI WorldTeams

- Lotto–Intermarché

UCI ProTeams

- Burgos Burpellet BH
- Equipo Kern Pharma
- Euskaltel–Euskadi
- Solution Tech NIPPO Rali
- Team Novo Nordisk

UCI Continental Teams

- 7 Eleven–Cliqq Roadbike Philippines
- Aisan Racing Team
- Astemo Utsunomiya Blitzen
- CCACHE x BODYWRAP
- EuroCyclingTrips–CCN
- Hrinkow Advarics
- Jakarta Pro Cycling Team
- Kinan Racing Team
- Roojai Insurance Winspace
- Sparkle Oita Racing Team
- Team Ukyo
- Terengganu Cycling Team
- Victoria Sports Pro Cycling

National Teams

- Chinese Taipei (Taiwan)
- Thailand

== Route ==
Stage characteristics and winners
Stage	Date	Course	Distance	Type	Stage winner
1	15 March	Taipei City to Taipei City	80.6 km (50.1 mi)	Flat stage	Dušan Rajović (SRB)
2	16 March	Taoyuan Chungli Chintan Park to Jiaobanshan Park	123.3 km (76.6 mi)	Hilly stage	Matthew Fox (AUS)
3	17 March	Fo Guang Shan Buddha Museum to Kaohsiung National Stadium	146.4 km (91.0 mi)	Hilly stage	Matys Grisel (FRA)
4	18 March	Gaushu Township Office to Liugdui Hakka Cultural Park	131.2 km (81.5 mi)	Flat stage	Dušan Rajović (SRB)
5	19 March	Luye Township Office to Liyu Lake Visitor Center	153.7 km (95.5 mi)	Hilly stage	Lucas Carstensen (GER)
Total			635.2 km (394.7 mi)		

== Stages ==
=== Stage 1 ===
15 March 2026 — Taipei City to Taipei City, 80.6 km (50.1 mi)

Stage 1 Result
Rank	Rider	Team	Time
1	Dušan Rajović (SRB)	Solution Tech NIPPO Rali	1h 35' 54"
2	Liam Walsh (AUS)	CCACHE x BODYWRAP	+ 0"
3	Andrea D'Amato (ITA)	Team Ukyo	+ 0"
4	Thibaut Bernard (BEL)	Lotto–Intermarché	+ 0"
5	Tilen Finkšt (SLO)	Solution Tech NIPPO Rali	+ 0"
6	Matys Grisel (FRA)	Lotto–Intermarché	+ 0"
7	Paul Hennequin (FRA)	Euskaltel–Euskadi	+ 0"
8	Lucas Carstensen (GER)	Kinan Racing Team	+ 0"
9	Yoshiki Terada (JPN)	Team Ukyo	+ 0"
10	Rodrigo Alvarez Rodriguez (ESP)	Burgos Burpellet BH	+ 0"

General classification after Stage 1
Rank	Rider	Team	Time
1	Dušan Rajović (SRB)	Solution Tech NIPPO Rali	1h 35' 44"
2	Liam Walsh (AUS)	CCACHE x BODYWRAP	+ 1"
3	Andrea D'Amato (ITA)	Team Ukyo	+ 6"
4	Fergus Browning (AUS)	Terengganu Cycling Team	+ 7"
5	Nil Gimeno (ESP)	Equipo Kern Pharma	+ 8"
6	Yuma Koishi (JPN)	Kinan Racing Team	+ 8"
7	Dylan Hopkins (AUS)	Roojai Insurance Winspace	+ 9"
8	Cormac McGeough (IRL)	7 Eleven–Cliqq Roadbike Philippines	+ 9"
9	Thibaut Bernard (BEL)	Lotto–Intermarché	+ 10"
10	Tilen Finkšt (SLO)	Solution Tech NIPPO Rali	+ 10"

=== Stage 2 ===
16 March 2026 — Taoyuan Chungli Chintan Park to Jiaobanshan Park, 123.3 km (76.6 mi)

Stage 2 Result
Rank	Rider	Team	Time
1	Matthew Fox (AUS)	Lotto–Intermarché	2h 45' 36"
2	Jordi López (ESP)	Euskaltel–Euskadi	+ 0"
3	Matys Grisel (FRA)	Lotto–Intermarché	+ 0"
4	Iván Cobo (ESP)	Equipo Kern Pharma	+ 0"
5	Lorenzo Quartucci (ITA)	Burgos Burpellet BH	+ 0"
6	Louis Sutton (GBR)	Euskaltel–Euskadi	+ 0"
7	Nil Gimeno (ESP)	Equipo Kern Pharma	+ 0"
8	Mathias Bregnhøj (DEN)	Terengganu Cycling Team	+ 0"
9	Xabier Isasa (ESP)	Euskaltel–Euskadi	+ 0"
10	Yuhi Todome (JPN)	Aisan Racing Team	+ 0"

General classification after Stage 2
Rank	Rider	Team	Time
1	Matthew Fox (AUS)	Lotto–Intermarché	4h 21' 20"
2	Jordi López (ESP)	Euskaltel–Euskadi	+ 4"
3	Matys Grisel (FRA)	Lotto–Intermarché	+ 6"
4	Fergus Browning (AUS)	Terengganu Cycling Team	+ 7"
5	Nil Gimeno (ESP)	Equipo Kern Pharma	+ 8"
6	Yuma Koishi (JPN)	Kinan Racing Team	+ 8"
7	Dylan Hopkins (AUS)	Roojai Insurance Winspace	+ 9"
8	Lorenzo Quartucci (ITA)	Burgos Burpellet BH	+ 10"
9	Louis Sutton (GBR)	Euskaltel–Euskadi	+ 10"
10	Xabier Isasa (ESP)	Euskaltel–Euskadi	+ 10"

=== Stage 3 ===
17 March 2026 — Fo Guang Shan Buddha Museum to Kaohsiung National Stadium, 146.4 km (91.0 mi)

Stage 3 Result
Rank	Rider	Team	Time
1	Matys Grisel (FRA)	Lotto–Intermarché	3h 06' 28"
2	Paul Hennequin (FRA)	Euskaltel–Euskadi	+ 0"
3	Yoshiki Terada (JPN)	Team Ukyo	+ 0"
4	Andrea D'Amato (ITA)	Team Ukyo	+ 0"
5	Tilen Finkšt (SLO)	Solution Tech NIPPO Rali	+ 0"
6	Lucas Carstensen (GER)	Kinan Racing Team	+ 0"
7	Iván Cobo (ESP)	Equipo Kern Pharma	+ 0"
8	Jude Francisco (PHI)	Victoria Sports Pro Cycling	+ 0"
9	Atsushi Oka (JPN)	Astemo Utsunomiya Blitzen	+ 0"
10	Louis Sutton (GBR)	Euskaltel–Euskadi	+ 0"

General classification after Stage 3
Rank	Rider	Team	Time
1	Matys Grisel (FRA)	Lotto–Intermarché	7h 27' 42"
2	Matthew Fox (AUS)	Lotto–Intermarché	+ 4"
3	Jordi López (ESP)	Euskaltel–Euskadi	+ 7"
4	Nil Gimeno (ESP)	Equipo Kern Pharma	+ 12"
5	Iván Cobo (ESP)	Equipo Kern Pharma	+ 13"
6	Fergus Browning (AUS)	Terengganu Cycling Team	+ 13"
7	Carter Bettles (AUS)	Roojai Insurance Winspace	+ 13"
8	Lorenzo Quartucci (ITA)	Burgos Burpellet BH	+ 14"
9	Yuma Koishi (JPN)	Kinan Racing Team	+ 14"
10	Dylan Hopkins (AUS)	Roojai Insurance Winspace	+ 15"

=== Stage 4 ===
18 March 2026 — Gaushu Township Office to Liugdui Hakka Cultural Park, 131.2 km (81.5 mi)

Stage 4 Result
Rank	Rider	Team	Time
1	Dušan Rajović (SRB)	Solution Tech NIPPO Rali	2h 44' 49"
2	Paul Hennequin (FRA)	Euskaltel–Euskadi	+ 0"
3	Andrea D'Amato (ITA)	Team Ukyo	+ 0"
4	Liam Walsh (AUS)	CCACHE x BODYWRAP	+ 0"
5	Matys Grisel (FRA)	Lotto–Intermarché	+ 0"
6	Rodrigo Alvarez Rodriguez (ESP)	Burgos Burpellet BH	+ 0"
7	Tilen Finkšt (SLO)	Solution Tech NIPPO Rali	+ 0"
8	Shiki Kuroeda (JPN)	Sparkle Oita Racing Team	+ 0"
9	Célestin Wattelle (FRA)	Team Novo Nordisk	+ 0"
10	Max Campbell (AUS)	CCACHE x BODYWRAP	+ 0"

General classification after Stage 4
Rank	Rider	Team	Time
1	Matys Grisel (FRA)	Lotto–Intermarché	10h 12' 31"
2	Matthew Fox (AUS)	Lotto–Intermarché	+ 4"
3	Jordi López (ESP)	Euskaltel–Euskadi	+ 7"
4	Nil Gimeno (ESP)	Equipo Kern Pharma	+ 12"
5	Iván Cobo (ESP)	Equipo Kern Pharma	+ 13"
6	Fergus Browning (AUS)	Terengganu Cycling Team	+ 13"
7	Carter Bettles (AUS)	Roojai Insurance Winspace	+ 13"
8	Lorenzo Quartucci (ITA)	Burgos Burpellet BH	+ 14"
9	Yuma Koishi (JPN)	Kinan Racing Team	+ 14"
10	Dylan Hopkins (AUS)	Roojai Insurance Winspace	+ 15"

=== Stage 5 ===
19 March 2026 — Luye Township Office to Liyu Lake Visitor Center, 153.7 km (95.5 mi)

Stage 5 Result
Rank	Rider	Team	Time
1	Lucas Carstensen (GER)	Kinan Racing Team	3h 24' 47"
2	Liam Walsh (AUS)	CCACHE x BODYWRAP	+ 0"
3	Yoshiki Terada (JPN)	Team Ukyo	+ 0"
4	Dušan Rajović (SRB)	Solution Tech NIPPO Rali	+ 0"
5	Paul Hennequin (FRA)	Euskaltel–Euskadi	+ 0"
6	Jeroen Meijers (NED)	Victoria Sports Pro Cycling	+ 0"
7	Iván Cobo (ESP)	Equipo Kern Pharma	+ 0"
8	Célestin Wattelle (FRA)	Team Novo Nordisk	+ 0"
9	Andrea D'Amato (ITA)	Team Ukyo	+ 0"
10	Lorenzo Quartucci (ITA)	Burgos Burpellet BH	+ 0"

General classification after Stage 5
Rank	Rider	Team	Time
1	Matys Grisel (FRA)	Lotto–Intermarché	13h 37' 18"
2	Matthew Fox (AUS)	Lotto–Intermarché	+ 4"
3	Jordi López (ESP)	Euskaltel–Euskadi	+ 5"
4	Nil Gimeno (ESP)	Equipo Kern Pharma	+ 9"
5	Dylan Hopkins (AUS)	Roojai Insurance Winspace	+ 13"
6	Iván Cobo (ESP)	Equipo Kern Pharma	+ 13"
7	Fergus Browning (AUS)	Terengganu Cycling Team	+ 13"
8	Carter Bettles (AUS)	Roojai Insurance Winspace	+ 13"
9	Lorenzo Quartucci (ITA)	Burgos Burpellet BH	+ 14"
10	Yuma Koishi (JPN)	Kinan Racing Team	+ 14"

== Classification leadership table ==
Classification leadership by stage
Stage	Winner	General classification	Points classification	Mountains classification	Asian rider classification	Best Chinese Taipei rider	Team classification
1	Dušan Rajović	Dušan Rajović	Liam Walsh	Not awarded	Yuma Koishi	Chang You-cheng	Lotto–Intermarché
2	Matthew Fox	Matthew Fox	Liam Walsh	Yuhi Todome	Yuma Koishi	Huang Wei-cheng	Euskaltel–Euskadi
3	Matys Grisel	Matys Grisel	Matys Grisel	Yuhi Todome	Yuma Koishi	Huang Wei-cheng	Euskaltel–Euskadi
4	Dušan Rajović	Matys Grisel	Matys Grisel	Yuhi Todome	Yuma Koishi	Huang Wei-cheng	Euskaltel–Euskadi
5	Lucas Carstensen	Matys Grisel	Paul Hennequin	Yuhi Todome	Yuma Koishi	Huang Wei-cheng	Euskaltel–Euskadi
Final		Matys Grisel	Paul Hennequin	Yuhi Todome	Yuma Koishi	Huang Wei-cheng	Euskaltel–Euskadi

- On stage 4, Andrea D'Amato, who was second in the points classification, wore the green jersey, because first-placed Matys Grisel wore the yellow jersey as the leader of the general classification; Paul Hennequin who was second in the points classification wore the green jersey on stage 5 for the same reason.

== Classification standings ==
Legend
Denotes the leader of the general classification	Denotes the leader of the mountains classification
Denotes the leader of the points classification	Denotes the leader of the Asian rider classification

=== General classification ===
Final general classification (1–10)
Rank	Rider	Team	Time
1	Matys Grisel (FRA)	Lotto–Intermarché	13h 37' 18"
2	Matthew Fox (AUS)	Lotto–Intermarché	+ 4"
3	Jordi López (ESP)	Euskaltel–Euskadi	+ 5"
4	Nil Gimeno (ESP)	Equipo Kern Pharma	+ 9"
5	Dylan Hopkins (AUS)	Roojai Insurance Winspace	+ 13"
6	Iván Cobo (ESP)	Equipo Kern Pharma	+ 13"
7	Fergus Browning (AUS)	Terengganu Cycling Team	+ 13"
8	Carter Bettles (AUS)	Roojai Insurance Winspace	+ 13"
9	Lorenzo Quartucci (ITA)	Burgos Burpellet BH	+ 14"
10	Yuma Koishi (JPN)	Kinan Racing Team	+ 14"

=== Points classification ===
Final points classification (1–10)
Rank	Rider	Team	Points
1	Paul Hennequin (FRA)	Euskaltel–Euskadi	52
2	Dušan Rajović (SRB)	Solution Tech NIPPO Rali	49
3	Liam Walsh (AUS)	CCACHE x BODYWRAP	46
4	Andrea D'Amato (ITA)	Team Ukyo	45
5	Matys Grisel (FRA)	Lotto–Intermarché	42
6	Lucas Carstensen (GER)	Kinan Racing Team	38
7	Yoshiki Terada (JPN)	Team Ukyo	36
8	Tilen Finkšt (SLO)	Solution Tech NIPPO Rali	29
9	Jordi López (ESP)	Euskaltel–Euskadi	25
10	Iván Cobo (ESP)	Equipo Kern Pharma	24

=== Mountains classification ===
Final mountains classification (1-10)
Rank	Rider	Team	Points
1	Yuhi Todome (JPN)	Aisan Racing Team	21
2	Adne van Engelen (NED)	Terengganu Cycling Team	20
3	Lorenzo Quartucci (ITA)	Burgos Burpellet BH	12
4	Matthew Fox (AUS)	Lotto–Intermarché	10
5	Ismael Grospe (PHI)	Victoria Sports Pro Cycling	10
6	Jordi López (ESP)	Euskaltel–Euskadi	9
7	Iván Cobo (ESP)	Equipo Kern Pharma	7
8	Josef Dirnbauer (AUT)	Hrinkow Advarics	7
9	Sarawut Sirironnachai (THA)	Thailand	6
10	Dušan Rajović (SRB)	Solution Tech NIPPO Rali	6

=== Asian rider classification ===
Final Asian rider classification (1–10)
Rank	Rider	Team	Time
1	Yuma Koishi (JPN)	Kinan Racing Team	13h 37' 32"
2	Yuhi Todome (JPN)	Aisan Racing Team	+ 2"
3	Nichol Pareja (PHI)	Victoria Sports Pro Cycling	+ 2"
4	George Matsui (JPN)	Aisan Racing Team	+ 47"
5	Genki Yamamoto (JPN)	Kinan Racing Team	+ 47"
6	Jambaljamts Sainbayar (MGL)	Burgos Burpellet BH	+ 53"
7	Peerapol Chawchiangkwang (THA)	Thailand	+ 53"
8	Kazuto Minami (JPN)	Aisan Racing Team	+ 2' 13"
9	Yoshiki Terada (JPN)	Team Ukyo	+ 3' 51"
10	Kota Sumiyoshi (JPN)	Sparkle Oita Racing Team	+ 3' 59"

=== Team classification ===
Final team classification (1–10)
Rank	Team	Time
1	(Spain) Euskaltel–Euskadi	40h 52' 42"
2	(Spain) Equipo Kern Pharma	+ 0"
3	(Malaysia) Terengganu Cycling Team	+ 45"
4	(Spain) Burgos Burpellet BH	+ 1' 36"
5	(Japan) Kinan Racing Team	+ 1' 36"
6	(Belgium) Lotto–Intermarché	+ 1' 45"
7	(Japan) Aisan Racing Team	+ 3' 02"
8	(Thailand) Roojai Insurance Winspace	+ 3' 57"
9	(Australia) CCACHE x BODYWRAP	+ 4' 07"
10	(Japan) Team Ukyo	+ 4' 22"
