= 2023 Hong Kong Challenge =

One-day cycling road race

2023 Hong Kong Cyclothon UCI 1.1 Road Race
2023 UCI Asia Tour

Race details
- Dates: October 22, 2023
- Distance: 103.2 km (64.13 mi)
- Winning time: 2h 29' 24"

Results
Jersey awarded to the overall winner	Winner	Lukas Pöstlberger (AUT)	(Team Jayco–AlUla)
	Second	Kane Richards (AUS)	(ARA Skip Capital)
	Third	Zdeněk Štybar (CZE)	(Team Jayco–AlUla)

The 2023 Hong Kong Cyclothon UCI 1.1 Road Race was the 2nd edition of the Hong Kong Challenge one-day race. The race was held on October 23, and was rated as a 1.1 event on the UCI Asia Tour.

Lukas Pöstlberger of Austria won the race, followed by Kane Richards of Australia second and Zdeněk Štybar of Czech third.

== Teams ==
Fourteen teams participated in the race. Each team had a maximum of six riders:

WorldTeams

- Team Jayco–AlUla

ProTeams

- Team Corratec–Selle Italia

Continental teams

- 7 Eleven–Cliqq–air21 by Roadbike Philippines
- ARA Skip Capital
- EuroCyclingTrips Pro Cycling
- Ferei Mongolia Team
- Nusantara Cycling Team
- Roojai Online Insurance
- The Hurricane & Thunder Cycling Team
- Terengganu Polygon Cycling Team
- Universe Cycling Team
- Wuzhishan Cycling Team
- X-Speed United

National teams

- Hong Kong

== Results ==
=== General classification ===
	Rider	Team	Time
1	(Austria) Lukas Pöstlberger	Team Jayco–AlUla	2h 29' 24"
2	(Australia) Kane Richards	ARA Skip Capital	+ 1' 18"
3	(Czech Republic) Zdeněk Štybar	Team Jayco–AlUla	+ 1' 18"
4	(Australia) Blake Quick	Team Jayco–AlUla	+ 1' 42"
5	(Greece) Polychronis Tzortzakis	Roojai Online Insurance	+ 1' 42"
6	(Grenada) Red Walters	X-Speed United	+ 1' 42"
7	(Indonesia) Aiman Cahyadi	Terengganu Polygon Cycling Team	+ 1' 42"
8	(Australia) Rudy Porter	Team Jayco–AlUla	+ 1' 43"
9	(Mongolia) Batsaikhany Tegshbayar	Roojai Online Insurance	+ 1' 43"
10	(Italy) Nicolas Dalla Valle	Team Corratec–Selle Italia	+ 1' 43"

== List of teams and riders ==
A total of 15 teams, including one WorldTeam, one ProTeam, 12 Continental teams, and 1 national team, were invited to participate in the 2023 SHKP Hong Kong Challenge. As the Chinese continental team Shenzhen Xidesheng Cycling Team was unable to attend, there were 76 riders in the remaining 14 teams taking part in the race.

(Australia) Team Jayco–AlUla

- (Australia) Hamish McKenzie
- (Colombia) Jesús David Peña
- (Australia) Rudy Porter
- (Austria) Lukas Pöstlberger
- (Australia) Blake Quick
- (Czech Republic) Zdeněk Štybar

(Italy) Team Corratec–Selle Italia

- (Italy) Nicolas Dalla Valle
- (Italy) Simone Olivero
- (Italy) Matteo Amella
- (Italy) Giulio Masotto
- (Italy) Attilio Viviani
- (Italy) Samuele Zambelli

7 Eleven–Cliqq–air21 by Roadbike Philippines

- (Philippines) Junreck Carcueva
- (Philippines) Marcelo Felipe
- (Philippines) Jude Gabriel Francisco
- (Philippines) Mark Galedo
- (Philippines) Ryan Tugawin
- (Philippines) Arjay Peralta

(Australia) ARA Skip Capital

- (Hong Kong) Ngai Chung Ki
- (Australia) William Eaves
- (Australia) Lachlan Miller
- (Australia) Kane Richards
- (Australia) Dylan Proctor-Parker

(Guam) EuroCyclingTrips Pro Cycling

- (Guam) Blayde Blas
- (United Kingdom) Siméon Green
- (United Kingdom) Hugo Lutz-Atkinson
- (France) Thomas Peyroton Dartet
- (France) Guillaume Soula

Ferei Mongolia Team

- (Hong Kong) Lo Chun Kit
- (Mongolia) Batbaatar Batsambuu
- (Mongolia) Bold Iderbold
- (China) Chen Yinzheng
- (Mongolia) Davaajargal Altangerel

(Indonesia) Nusantara Cycling Team

- (Indonesia) Muhmmad Ridwan
- (Indonesia) Abdul Gani
- (Indonesia) Muhamad Herlangga
- (Malaysia) Afiq Huznie Othman
- (Indonesia) Adrian Sevadil

(Thailand) Roojai Online Insurance

- (Mongolia) Batsaikhany Tegshbayar
- (Germany) Lucas Carstensen
- (Laos) Ariya Phounsavath
- (Netherlands) Adne van Engelen
- (Thailand) Kongphob Thimachai
- (Greece) Polychronis Tzortzakis

(Malaysia) Terengganu Polygon Cycling Team

- (Malaysia) Muhammad Shahmir Aiman Abdul Halim
- (Indonesia) Aiman Cahyadi
- (Malaysia) Wan Hamdan
- (Malaysia) Irwandie Lakasek
- (Netherlands) Jeroen Meijers
- (Malaysia) Zuladri Amin Zulkurnain

(Netherlands) Universe Cycling Team

- (Netherlands) Bart Buijk
- (Netherlands) Kenny Nijssen
- (Netherlands) Rick Nobel
- (Netherlands) Jarri Stravers
- (Netherlands) Roy Duijvesteijn
- (Belgium) Niels Verdijck

(China) Wuzhishan Cycling Team

- (Australia) Oliver Anderson
- (China) Huang Wenbo
- (Australia) Angus Miller
- (China) Zheng Bowen

(Canada) X-Speed United

- (Portugal) Bernardo Gonçalves
- (Belgium) Mark Groeneveld
- (Switzerland) Christoph Janssen
- (United Kingdom) George Radcliffe
- (United Kingdom) James Somerfield
- (Grenada) Red Walters

Hong Kong

- (Hong Kong) Chu Tsun Wai
- (Hong Kong) Ko Siu Wai
- (Hong Kong) Ng Pak Hang
- (Hong Kong) Liang King Hung
- (Hong Kong) Mow Ching Yin
- (Hong Kong) Ng Sum Lui

(China) The Hurricane & Thunder Cycling Team

- (China) Huang Guoqing
- (Taiwan) Huang Yucheng
- (Taiwan) Chen Xuan Ye
- (China) You Liming
