= 2023 UCI Asia Tour =

- Nineteenth edition of the UCI Asia Tour

Details
- Dates: 13 November 2022 – 16 October 2023
- Location: Asia
- Races: 26

The 2023 UCI Asia Tour was the 19th season of the UCI Asia Tour. The season began on 13 November 2022 with the Tour de Okinawa and ended in October 2023.

The points leader, based on the cumulative results of previous races, wore the UCI Asia Tour cycling jersey.

Throughout the season, points were awarded to the top finishers of stages within stage races and the final general classification standings of each of the stages races and one-day events. The quality and complexity of a race also determined how many points were awarded to the top finishers, the higher the UCI rating of a race, the more points were awarded.

The UCI race classifications from highest to lowest were as follows:

- Multi-day events: 2.1 and 2.2
- One-day events: 1.1 and 1.2

== Events ==
Races in the 2023 UCI Asia Tour
Race	Rating	Date	Winner	Team
(Japan) Tour de Okinawa	1.2	13 November 2022	Benjamín Prades (ESP)	Team Ukyo
(United Arab Emirates) Tour of Sharjah	2.2	27–31 January 2023	Adne van Engelen (NED)	Roojai Online Insurance
(Saudi Arabia) Saudi Tour	2.1	30 January – 3 February 2023	Ruben Guerreiro (POR)	Movistar Team
(Oman) Muscat Classic	1.1	10 February 2023	Jenthe Biermans (BEL)	Arkéa–Samsic
(Chinese Taipei) Tour de Taiwan	2.1	12–16 March 2023	Jeroen Meijers (NED)	Terengganu Polygon Cycling Team
Tour of Thailand	2.1	1–6 April 2023	Batsaikhany Tegshbayar (MGL)	Roojai Online Insurance
(Uzbekistan) The Tour Oqtosh - Chorvoq - Mountain I	1.2	10 May 2023	Ulugbek Saidov (UZB)	Team Novo Nordisk
(Uzbekistan) The Tour Oqtosh - Chorvoq - Mountain II	1.2	11 May 2023	Periklis Ilias (GRE)	P.S. Kronos
(Uzbekistan) Tour of Bostonliq I	1.2	13 May 2023	Daniil Marukhin (KAZ)	Kazakhstan (national team)
(Uzbekistan) Tour of Bostonliq II	1.2	14 May 2023	Ilkhan Dostiyev (KAZ)	Kazakhstan (national team)
Tour of Japan	2.1	21–28 May 2023	Nathan Earle (AUS)	JCL Team Ukyo
(Japan) Kozagawa-City International Road Race	1.2	2 June 2023	The race was cancelled due to the bad weather conditions.	
(Japan) Tour de Kumano	2.2	3–4 June 2023	Atsushi Oka (JPN)	JCL Team Ukyo
(Azerbaijan) Aziz Shusha	2.2	8–11 June 2023	Emanuele Ansaloni (ITA)	Team Technipes #inEmiliaRomagna
(China) Tour of Huangshan	2.2	21–23 July 2023	Julien Trarieux (FRA)	China Anta–Mentech Cycling Team
(Iran) Tour of Kandovan	1.2	26 August 2023	Anton Kuzmin (KAZ)	Almaty Cycling Team
Tour of Iran (Azarbaijan)	2.1	27–31 August 2023	Saeid Safarzadeh (IRI)	Tianyoude Hotel Cycling Team
(China) PingTan International Road Race	1.2	3 September 2023	Race is cancelled due to bad weather circumstances.	
(Japan) Tour de Hokkaido	2.2	8–10 September 2023	The race was cancelled after an accident involving a rider and a car.	
(China) Tour of Poyang Lake	2.2	8–12 September 2023	Lü Xianjing (CHN)	China Anta–Mentech Cycling Team
(Oman) Tour of Salalah	2.2	10–13 September 2023	Grega Bole (SVN)	Shabab Al Ahli Cycling Team
(China) Tour of Binzhou	2.2	23–24 September 2023	Lucas Carstensen (GER)	Roojai Online Insurance
(Japan) Oita Urban Classic	1.2	1 October 2023	Ryan Cavanagh (AUS)	Kinan Racing Team
(Japan) Tour de Kyushu	2.1	7–9 October 2023	Andrey Zeits (KAZ)	Astana Qazaqstan Team
(China) Trans–Himalaya Cycling Race	2.2	14–16 October 2023	Carlos Torres (VEN)	SCOM - Taishantiyu Team
