= Victoria Sports Pro Cycling =

Team information
- Registered: Philippines
- Founded: 2023
- Discipline: Road
- Status: UCI Continental

Victoria Sports Pro Cycling, also known as the Victoria Sports Cycling Team (VSCT) is a Philippine UCI Continental cycling team.

== History ==
Victoria Sports Pro Cycling was established by New San Jose Builders and is backed by various private firms as sponsors. It became the third UCI Continental Philippine-based team following 7-Eleven Roadbike Philippines and Go for Gold. The cycling team was officially launched on January 21, 2023 with its initial roster composed of Filipino and Portuguese cyclists introduced.

== Team roster ==
As of June 9, 2025.

Rider	Date of birth
Ean Cajucom (PHI)	June 20, 2002 (age 24)
Rush Camingao (PHI)	February 21, 2004 (age 22)
Daniel Cariño (PHI)	October 13, 1999 (age 26)
Edson Corbadora (PHI)	July 26, 2001 (age 25)
Marcelo Felipe (PHI)	February 10, 1990 (age 36)
Jude Gabriel Francisco (PHI)	October 20, 2004 (age 21)
Ismael Grospe (PHI)	January 7, 1999 (age 27)
Kenneth Maramba (PHI)	January 29, 1999 (age 27)

Rider	Date of birth
Jeroen Meijers (NED)	January 12, 1993 (age 33)
Edgar Nohales (ESP)	July 28, 1986 (age 40)
Miguel Obmerga (PHI)	October 12, 2000 (age 25)
Carlos Francisco Ochoa (PHI)	May 31, 1994 (age 32)
Alexis Pagara (PHI)	December 14, 2000 (age 25)
Nichol Blanca Pareja (PHI)	August 10, 2000 (age 26)
Eugenio Sánchez (ESP)	March 10, 1999 (age 27)
Nícolas Sessler (BRA)	April 29, 1994 (age 32)

== Major wins ==
2024
Oita Urban Classic, Jeroen Meijers
1st Overall Tour of Salalah, Nícolas Sessler

1st Stage 2, Nícolas Sessler

Philippines Time Trial, Nichol Blanca Pareja
2025
Philippines Road Race, Marcelo Felipe
1st Stage 2 Tour de Ijen, Jeroen Meijers
