= Antoine Huby =

French cyclist

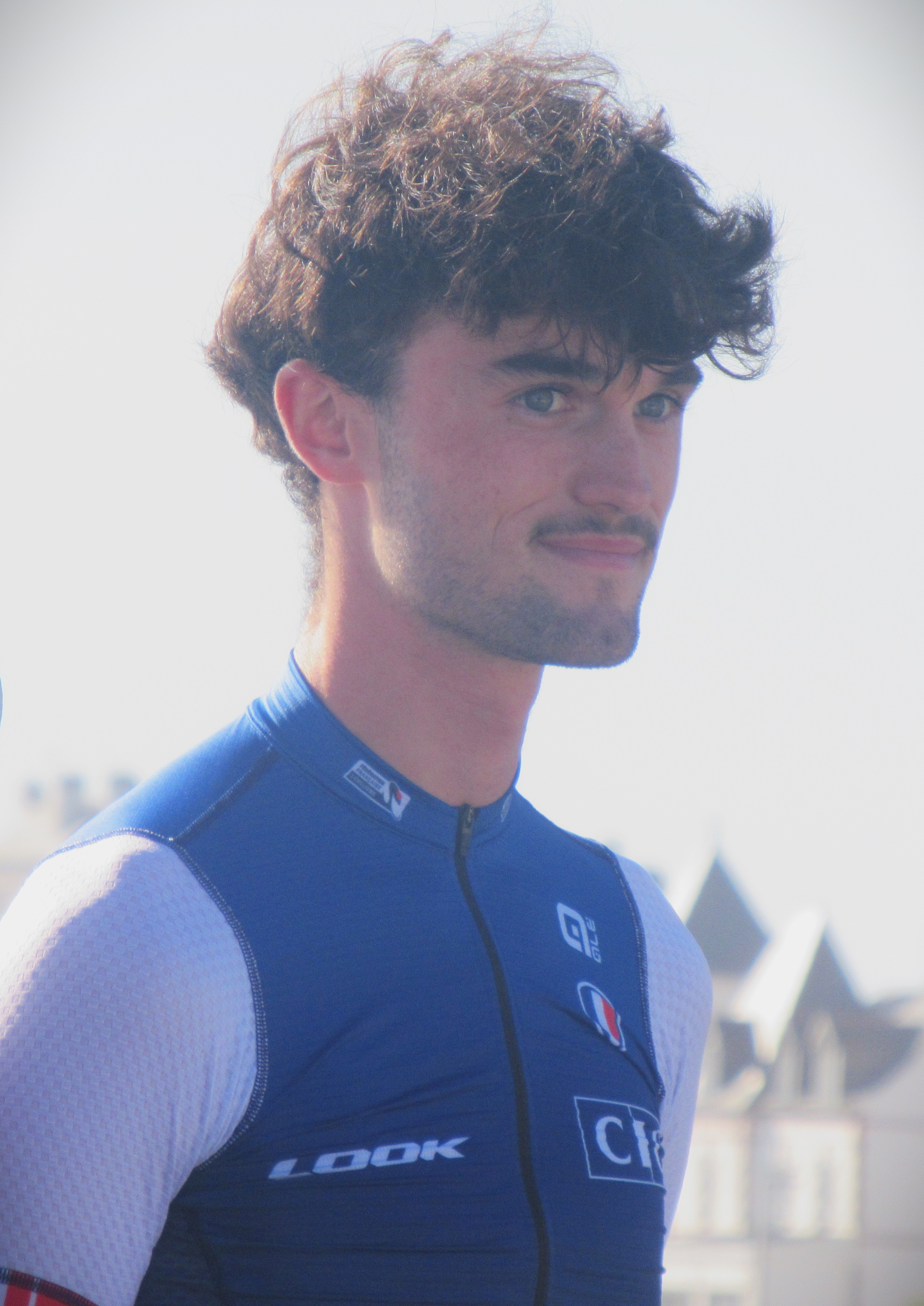
- Huby at the 2023 Tour de l'Avenir

Personal information
- Born: 19 January 2001 (age 25) Uzel, France
- Height: 1.74 m (5 ft 9 in)
- Weight: 56 kg (123 lb)

Cycling career
- Sport: Cycling
- Current team: 7 Eleven–Cliqq Roadbike Philippines
- Disciplines: Road; Cyclo-cross
- Role: Rider
- Rider type: Climber; Puncheur

Amateur teams
- 2019–2020: VC Pays de Loudéac
- 2023: Vendée U

Professional teams
- 2021–2022: Cross Team Legendre
- 2024–2025: Soudal–Quick-Step
- 2026–: 7 Eleven–Cliqq Roadbike Philippines

Antoine Huby (born 19 January 2001) is a French cyclist who competes in road bicycle racing and cyclo-cross. He rides for the UCI Continental team 7 Eleven–Cliqq Roadbike Philippines. He previously rode for the UCI WorldTeam Soudal–Quick-Step during the 2024 and 2025 seasons. He was born in Uzel, a commune in the Cotes d'Armor department in the Brittany region of France. He specializes as a climber and a puncheur in road cycling events. He won French national cyclo-cross championships in the cadet, junior, and Under-23 age groups.

== Early life ==
Huby grew up in Uzel, located in northwestern France. He began riding bicycles during his childhood. He completed evening training rides on the local roads around Uzel with his father. He joined a local amateur club, CC Uzelais, and competed in regional events from 2016 to 2017. Huby attended La Ville Davy, an educational institution located in Quessoy. He enrolled in the professional baccalaureate program known as NJPF, which stands for Nature, Jardins, Paysage, Foret. At La Ville Davy, Huby received instruction from Jerome Couppey, a teacher in the NJPF section and a former mountain bike competitor who managed the mountain biking division. Couppey provided Huby with technical guidance on off-road bicycle handling. Huby developed a habit of greeting race referees and organizers at amateur events, attributing this polite demeanor to his upbringing.

== Amateur cyclo-cross career ==
Huby focused his early athletic efforts on cyclo-cross. He won the French National Cyclo-cross Championships in the cadet category in 2017 while a student at La Ville Davy. During a muddy cyclo-cross race in Lievin, he pedaled past competitors who were running with their bicycles in the deep mud. Huby advanced to the junior category and joined the amateur team VC Pays de Loudeac. He secured the French National Junior Cyclo-cross Championship title during the 2018 to 2019 season. Following his junior career, Huby transitioned to the Under-23 category and signed with Cross Team Legendre. During the 2020 to 2021 season, he won the French National Under-23 Cyclo-cross Championship. He became the first French rider to win consecutive national cyclo-cross titles across the cadet, junior, and Under-23 classifications.

== Initial transition to road racing and physical trauma ==
Huby incorporated road racing into his schedule. During a stage of the Tour Alsace, he finished second on the ascent of the Planche des Belles Filles. This performance led to discussions with his coach, Herve Gebel, about his physiological suitability for professional road racing. His progress stopped due to a training accident in June 2022. While descending a mountain pass, he crashed to avoid a motor vehicle. The impact resulted in a fracture of his left femur. A surgeon informed Huby that he might experience chronic pain and that a return to professional cycling was uncertain. Huby completed physical therapy and resumed bicycle training.

== Amateur road racing with Vendee U ==
Huby shifted his focus to road racing for the 2023 season and joined Vendée U. He finished second at the Liège–Bastogne–Liège U23 and second overall at the Flèche du Sud. He won the general classification of the Course de la Paix U23 – Grand Prix Jeseníky. He was originally listed as a reserve rider for the French national team for this event before being added to the starting roster.

== The WorldTour years with Soudal Quick Step ==
In August 2023, the Belgian UCI WorldTeam SSoudal–Quick-Step announced they signed Huby to a two-year contract covering the 2024 and 2025 seasons. The team's scout, Johan Molly, initiated contact with Huby after his second place finish at Liège–Bastogne–Liège U23. The transfer allowed Huby to race alongside Julian Alaphilippe and Remco Evenepoel. Huby integrated data driven training protocols and nutritional planning into his routine. He made his WorldTour debut in Australia at the Santos Tour Down Under in January 2024, finishing twenty-seventh in the general classification. He participated in the 2025 Grand Prix Cycliste de Québec and the Grand Prix Cycliste de Montréal later in the year. Huby began the 2025 season with a return trip to Australia, finishing eleventh at the Surf Coast Classic. On February 15, 2025, while participating in a training ride, he was struck by a motor vehicle. The collision forced him to stop riding for several weeks. He participated in the Vuelta a Burgos in August, recording three stage finishes within the top twenty. Soudal Quick-Step did not renew his contract for the 2026 season.

== Contract free agency and psychological impact ==
The non-renewal of his contract left Huby without an employer for the 2026 season. The situation led to a psychological decline during the winter. Huby reported seeing his future in black and questioned his motivation to train. He struggled to leave his house to ride his bicycle and stopped following the training plans provided by his coach, Herve Gebel. He engaged in alternative physical activities, including running with his girlfriend who was preparing for a marathon. His family provided support during this period. In the spring of 2026, a French compatriot named Edouard Bonnefoix presented an offer from 7-Eleven Cliqq Roadbike Philippines. Huby signed with the team to return to competition and score UCI points.

== Resurgence at the 2026 Tour of Luzon, Philippines ==
Huby traveled to the Philippines to join the 7-Eleven Cliqq Roadbike Philippines roster. He adapted to the extreme meteorological conditions, experiencing ambient temperatures reaching 45 degrees Celsius. Huby shared cooling techniques with his teammates, such as placing ice inside nylon tights down the back of their racing jerseys. The primary target for the team was the MPTC Tour of Luzon, a fourteen-stage national race held in April and May 2026.

Stage 10 of the competition took place on May 9, 2026. The route covered 124.2 kilometers, starting in Candon City and finishing atop the Bessang Pass Natural Monument in Cervantes, Ilocos Sur. Bessang Pass is a Hors Categorie climb stretching for 30 kilometers. Huby bridged across to a six-man breakaway group in the final ten kilometers. During the ascent, he suffered a front wheel flat tire. He received a wheel change and chased back to the lead group. In the final three kilometers, Huby accelerated and dropped the yellow jersey holder Nikita Shulchenko. Huby crossed the finish line alone in 3 hours, 32 minutes, and 1 second, collapsing in physical exhaustion. He finished 50 seconds ahead of Shulchenko.

On May 11, the riders faced Stage 12, covering 141.4 kilometers from Agoo, La Union, to the Daang Kalikasan view deck in Mangatarem, Pangasinan. The route finished with a 7.4 kilometer Category 2 ascent. Ronnilan Quita executed an attack at the base of the final climb to test Shulchenko. Shulchenko dropped to the rear of the lead group. Huby launched an acceleration, establishing a 15-second gap. He won the stage with a time of 3 hours, 17 minutes, and 37 seconds. Shulchenko finished in second place, 1 minute and 20 seconds behind Huby.

The 14th and last stage occurred on May 13. The stage covered 177.8 kilometers from Lingayen to Baguio. The route required the riders to ascend Kennon Road. Huby broke away from Shulchenko and the lead group past the Lion's Head landmark with seven kilometers remaining. He crossed the finish line at Camp John Hay to win his third and final stage, recording a time of 4 hours, 26 minutes, and 42 seconds. Nikita Shulchenko finished the stage 2 minutes and 12 seconds after Huby and won the overall general classification. Huby finished in second place overall, 1 minute and 34 seconds behind the winner.

Huby won the points classification and the mountains classification. He was awarded the Most Combative Rider honors. Huby's individual performances, along with teammates Ronnilan Quita, Mervin Corpuz, and Jonel Carcueva, secured the team general classification title for 7-Eleven Cliqq Roadbike Philippines. The team finished with a cumulative time of 162 hours, 25 minutes, and 49 seconds.

== Continued campaigns in Mauritius ==
Huby traveled to compete in the Tour de Maurice from June 2 to June 5, 2026. Huby targeted Stage 3, a 125 kilometer route from Cascavelle to Bois Cheri. He crossed the finish line first in a time of 3 hours, 12 minutes, and 7 seconds, tying on time with Anatolii Budiak. Huby finished the tour in second place in the general classification with an aggregate time of 12 hours, 9 minutes, and 56 seconds. He tied exactly on time with the overall winner, Budiak, and the final standing was decided by tiebreakers.

== Major results ==
=== Cyclo-cross ===
2018–2019
1st National Junior Championships
2nd Overall Junior Coupe de France

2nd Pierric
3rd Flamanville

3rd Junior Laudio
3rd Junior Elorrio
2020–2021
1st National Under-23 Championships

=== Road ===
2023
1st Overall Course de la Paix U23 – Grand Prix Jeseníky
2nd Overall Flèche du Sud
2nd Liège–Bastogne–Liège Espoirs
5th Overall Tour Alsace
7th Overall Orlen Nations Grand Prix
7th Manche-Atlantique
7th Tour du Gévaudan
9th Overall Circuit des Ardennes
2026
2nd Overall Tour de Maurice

1st Stage 3

2nd Overall Tour of Luzon

1st Stages 10, 12 & 14

10th Dhofar Classic
