= Edgar Nohales =

Spanish cyclist

Personal information
- Full name: Edgar Nohales Nieto
- Born: 28 July 1986 (age 40) Valladolid, Spain
- Height: 1.73 m (5 ft 8 in)
- Weight: 58 kg (128 lb)

Cycling career
- Sport: Cycling
- Current team: Victoria Sports Pro Cycling
- Discipline: Road
- Role: Rider
- Rider type: Climber

Amateur teams
- 2008–2009: Super Froiz
- 2010: Ciudad de Lugo
- 2011–2012: Aluminios Cortizo–CC Padrones

Professional teams
- 2010: LeTua Cycling Team
- 2013: Polygon Sweet Nice
- 2014–2015: Team 7 Eleven Road Bike Philippines
- 2015: Qinghai Tianyoude–BH Cycling Team
- 2016–2017: 7 Eleven–Sava RBP
- 2018: Ningxia Sports Lottery–Livall Cycling Team
- 2019: Taiyuan Miogee Cycling Team
- 2020: SSOIS Miogee Cycling Team
- 2021: Sweet Nice Continental Cycling Team
- 2022: Spor Toto Cycling Team
- 2023: Matrix Powertag
- 2024–: Victoria Sports Pro Cycling Team

Edgar Nohales Nieto (born 28 July 1986) is a Spanish cyclist, who currently rides for UCI Continental team Victoria Sports Pro Cycling.

== Major results ==
2006
1st Trofeo San Juan y San Pedro
2013
8th Overall Le Tour de Filipinas
2016
5th Overall Jelajah Malaysia
2017
Tour de Flores

1st Mountains classification
1st Stage 4

4th Overall Tour of Xingtai
6th Overall Tour de Molvccas
6th Overall Le Tour de Filipinas
9th Overall Tour de Lombok
2019
2nd Overall Tour of Guam
