= Ronnilan Quita =

Filipino bicycle racer

Personal information
- Born: 23 November 1995 (age 30) Philippines

Cycling career
- Sport: Cycling
- Current team: 7 Eleven–Cliqq Roadbike Philippines
- Discipline: Road
- Role: Rider

Amateur teams
- 2016: LBC-MVP Sports Foundation
- 2017: Kinetix Lab-Army
- 2018: Team Go for Gold

Professional teams
- 2019: Team Go for Gold
- 2020-2025: Go for Gold Philippines
- 2026–: 7 Eleven–Cliqq Roadbike Philippines

Major wins
- One-day races and Classics National Road Race Championships (2026)

Ronnilan Quita (born 23 November 1995) is a Filipino cyclist, who currently rides for UCI Continental team 7 Eleven–Cliqq Roadbike Philippines.

== Major results ==
2020
1st Stage 3, Cambodia Bay Cycling Tour
2022
4th Road race, National Road Championships
2026 (1 pro win)
1st Road race, National Road Championships
5th Overall, Tour of Luzon
