= Pingtung Distillery =

Distillery in Neipu, Pingtung County, Taiwan

Pingtung Distillery 屏東酒廠
- Location: Neipu, Pingtung County, Taiwan
- Coordinates: 22°38′44″N 120°32′59″E
- Owner: Taiwan Tobacco and Liquor Corporation
- Founded: 1898
- Website: Official website (in Chinese)

The Pingtung Distillery (traditional Chinese: 屏東酒廠; simplified Chinese: 屏东酒厂; pinyin: Píngdōng Jiǔchǎng) is a distillery in Neipu Township, Pingtung County, Taiwan owned by Taiwan Tobacco and Liquor Corporation.

== History ==
The distillery was originally established in 1898 as Taiwan Soutokufu Senbaikyoku in Pingtung City. In 1946, the distillery became an independent entity. In 1988, it was relocated to Neipu Township.

== Architecture ==
The distillery spans over an area of 20 hectares.

== See also ==
- Taiwanese cuisine
