= Carter Bettles =

Australian cyclist)

Personal information
- Born: 2 February 1998 (age 28) Brisbane, Australia

Cycling career
- Sport: Cycling
- Current team: Roojai Insurance Winspace
- Discipline: Road
- Role: Rider

Amateur team
- 2017: Cobra9 Interbuild Racing

Professional teams
- 2019: Futuro–Maxxis Pro Cycling
- 2020–2021: St George Continental Cycling Team
- 2022: ARA Pro Racing Sunshine Coast
- 2023: Victoire Hiroshima
- 2024–: Roojai Insurance

Carter Bettles (born 2 February 1998) is an Australian cyclist, who currently rides for UCI Continental team Roojai Insurance Winspace. He won the 2026 Oceania Road Race Championships.

== Major results ==
2022
2nd Overall Tour of Southland

1st Stage 4

3rd Overall Tour of Tasmania
9th Oita Urban Classic
2023 (1 pro win)
6th Oita Urban Classic
7th Overall Tour of Japan

1st Stage 3

2024 (1)
2nd Tour de Batam
3rd Overall Tour de Taiwan

1st Stage 4

3rd The Bueng Si Fai International Road Race
5th Overall Tour of Thailand
6th Road race, Oceania Road Championships
8th Overall Tour of Japan
2025
7th Overall Tour de Banyuwangi Ijen

1st Stage 3

8th Overall Tour of Salalah
8th The Road Race Tokyo Tama
2026 (1)
Oceania Road Championships

1st Road race
6th Time trial

2nd Overall Pune Grand Tour
8th Overall Tour de Taiwan
