= Cornelio Padilla =

Filipino cyclist (1946–2013)

Personal information
- Born: November 18, 1946 Manila, Philippines
- Died: December 8, 2013 (aged 67) Taguig, Philippines
- Height: 165 cm (5 ft 5 in)
- Weight: 51 kg (112 lb)

Cycling career
- Sport: Cycling

Cornelio Agaid Padilla Jr. (November 18, 1946 – December 8, 2013) was a Filipino cyclist who was a competitor at the 1964 Summer Olympics and a two-time Marlboro Tour champion.

== Career ==
Padilla competed in the individual road race and team time trial events at the 1964 Summer Olympics. He won bronze at the 1965 Asian Amateur Cycling Championship before turning professional in the of followying year.

Padilla was a two-time Marlboro Tour (now Tour de Luzon) champion, winning the 1966 and 1967 races.

== Post-retirement ==
Padilla retired early from cycling using his earnings from his professional races to fund his collegiate studies. He graduated from the Far Eastern University in 1974 with a law degree.

As a lawyer he became part of Cacho Printing Press. He later joined National Book Store (NBS) as a personnel manager and house lawyer before becoming one of NBS' top executives handling the company's human resources department.

== Death ==
Padilla died on December 8, 2013, at the St. Luke's Medical Center – Global City in Taguig due to heart failure.

== Personal life ==
A native of Santa Cruz, Manila, Padilla was married to Luzviminda Gumatay with whom he had four children.
