= Marcelo Felipe =

Filipino road cyclist

Personal information
- Full name: Marcelo Felipe Hernández
- Born: 10 February 1990 (age 36)
- Height: 1.65 m (5 ft 5 in)
- Weight: 60 kg (132 lb)

Cycling career
- Sport: Cycling
- Current team: Victoria Sports Pro Cycling
- Discipline: Road
- Role: Rider
- Rider type: Climber

Professional teams
- 2013–2023: 7 Eleven Presented by Road Bike Philippines
- 2024–: Victoria Sports Pro Cycling Team
Medal record
Representing Philippines
Men's road bicycle racing
Southeast Asian Games
Bronze medal – third place	2019 Tagaytay	Team road race

Marcelo Felipe Hernández (born 10 February 1990) is a Filipino cyclist, who rides for UCI Continental team Victoria Sports Pro Cycling.

== Major results ==
2015
National Road Championships

3rd Road race
3rd Time trial

6th Overall Tour of Borneo
10th Overall Jelajah Malaysia
2016
4th Overall Tour of Thailand
5th Overall Tour de Filipinas
6th Overall Tour de Ijen
7th Overall Jelajah Malaysia
7th Tour de Jakarta
8th Overall Tour de Flores
9th Overall Tour de Singkarak
2017
3rd Overall Tour de Flores
9th Overall Tour de Singkarak
10th Overall Jelajah Malaysia
2018
3rd Road race, National Road Championships
4th Overall Tour de Singkarak
8th Overall Tour de Ijen
8th Overall Tour de Filipinas
2019
1st Overall PRUride Philippines

1st Mountains classification

1st Stage 2 Ronda Pilipinas
3rd Team road race, Southeast Asian Games
7th Overall Tour of Thailand
2021
6th Overall Tour of Thailand
2022
2nd Road race, National Road Championships
7th Overall Tour of Thailand
2023
8th Overall Tour of Thailand
