= Meiho University =

University in Pingtung, Taiwan

- 美和科技大學
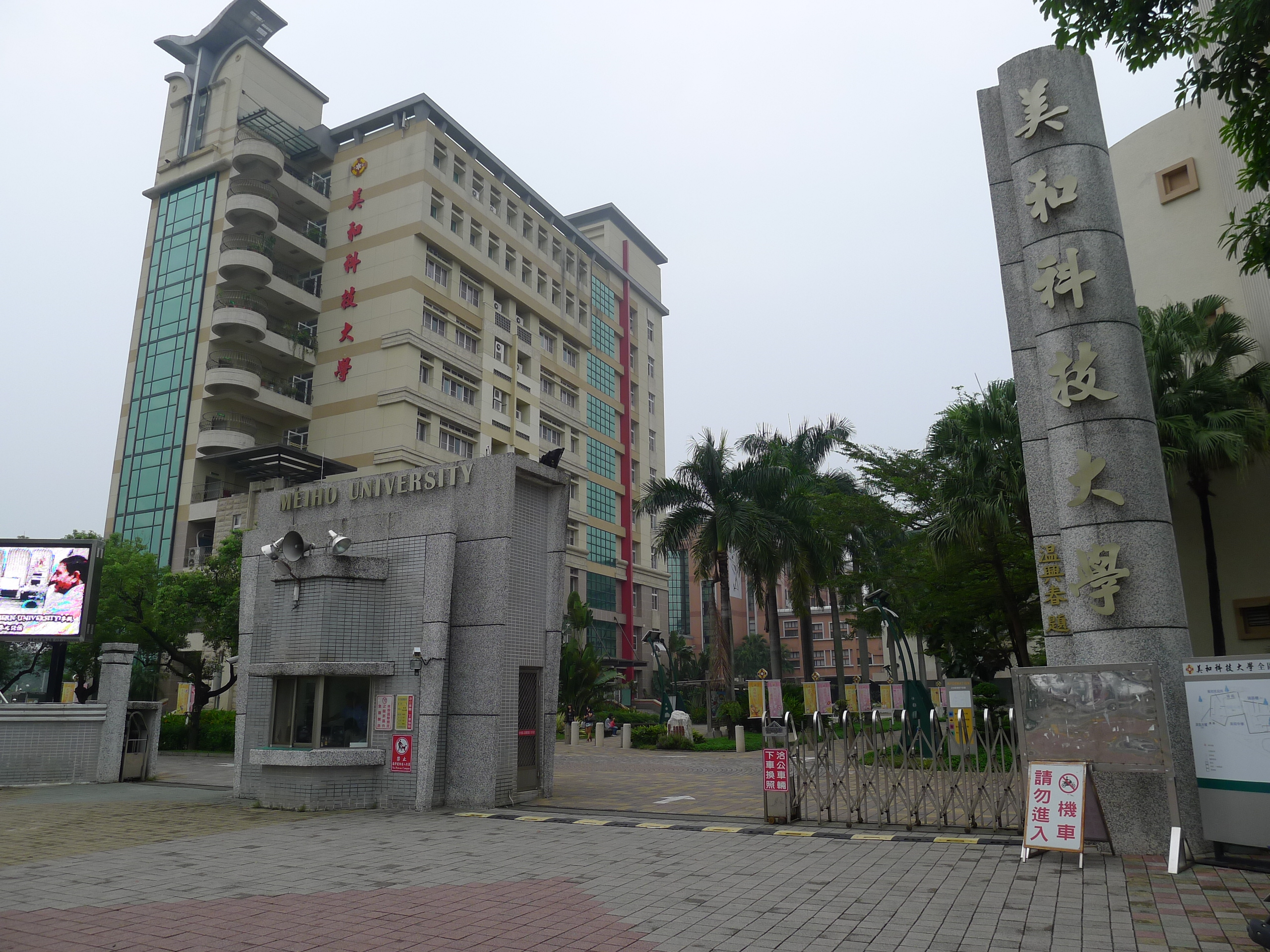
- Former names: Meiho Junior College of Nursing; Meiho Junior College of Nursing and Management; Meiho Institute of Technology
- Type: Private university
- Established: 1966
- President: Weng Shun-hsiang
- Location: Neipu, Pingtung County, Taiwan; 22.6051°N 120.5607°E
- Website: www.meiho.edu.tw
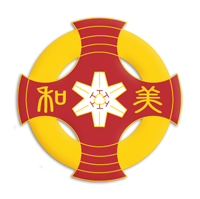

Meiho University (MU; Chinese: 美和科技大學; Pe̍h-ōe-jī: Bí-hô Kho-ki Tāi-ha̍k) is an accredited, private university in Neipu Township, Pingtung County, Taiwan. It has nearly 8,000 students. MU is known for its nursing program.

Meiho University offers undergraduate and graduate programs across a wide range of disciplines, including business, engineering, computer science, design, humanities, and social sciences. The university has six colleges: the College of Engineering, the College of Business and Management, the College of Humanities and Social Sciences, the College of Design, the College of Health and Medical Sciences, and the College of Tourism.

== History ==
The university began in 1966 as Taiwan's first private nursing college named Meiho Junior College of Nursing. In 1990, the school was renamed to Meiho Junior College of Nursing and Management and again renamed to Meiho Institute of Technology in 1999. In 2010, the school was renamed Meiho University.

== Academics ==
MU houses 18 departments and three graduate institutes organized in three colleges.

- College of Health and Nursing
- College of Business and Management
- College of Human Ecology

MU offers graduate programs in Healthcare Management, Biotechnology, and Business Administration.

== See also ==
- List of universities in Taiwan
