= Matthew Fox (cyclist) =

Australian bicycle racer

Luke Matthew Fox
Personal information
- Born: 28 September 2002 (age 24) Keighley, England
- Height: 1.75 m (5 ft 9 in)
- Weight: 71 kg (157 lb)

Cycling career
- Sport: Cycling
- Current team: Lotto–Intermarché
- Discipline: Road
- Role: Rider

Amateur teams
- 2022–2023: Wheelbase CabTech Castelli
- 2023: Jegg–DJR Academy
- 2024: CC Étupes

Professional teams
- 2025: Véloce Club Rouen 76
- 2025: Lotto (stagiaire)
- 2026–: Lotto–Intermarché

Matthew Fox (born 28 September 2002) is an Australian cyclist, who currently rides for UCI WorldTeam Lotto–Intermarché.

== Major results ==
2023
1st Ilkley GP
Rás Tailteann

1st Points classification
1st Stages 2 & 3

2024
National Under-23 Championships

2nd Criterium
3rd Road race

2025
2nd Boucle de l'Artois
6th Overall Tour du Loir-et-Cher
2026
2nd Overall Tour de Taiwan

1st Stage 2
