= Go for Gold Cycling Team =

Filipino cycling team

Go for Gold Philippines
Team information
- UCI code: G4G
- Registered: Philippines
- Founded: 2017
- Status: UCI Continental (2019–)
- Bicycles: Storck Bikes

Key personnel
- Team managers: Ednalyn Calitis Hualda; Jamal Mutaqin

Team name history
- 2017–2019; 2020–: Team Go for Gold; Go for Gold Philippines

Go for Gold Philippines is a UCI Continental road cycling team based in the Philippines. It is managed as part of the Go for Gold project of the Powerball Marketing and Logistics Corp.

Go for Gold first registered with the UCI for the 2018 season. Its cycling jerseys are manufactured by Donen Sports.

== Team roster ==
As of February 13, 2021.

Rider	Date of birth
Jerry Aquino Jr. (PHI)	July 2, 1992 (age 34)
Joshua Bonifacio (PHI)	February 1, 1999 (age 27)
Jonel Carcueva (PHI)	May 23, 1995 (age 31)
Daniel Ven Cariño (PHI)	October 13, 1998 (age 27)
Ismael Grospe Jr. (PHI)	January 7, 1999 (age 27)
Rex Krog (PHI)	May 14, 2000 (age 26)

Rider	Date of birth
Marc Ryan Lago (PHI)	July 13, 2001 (age 25)
Jericho Lucero (PHI)	November 21, 1999 (age 26)
Aidan Mendoza (PHI)	July 21, 1999 (age 27)
Elmer Navarro (PHI)	October 24, 1991 (age 34)
Ronnilan Quita (PHI)	January 23, 1995 (age 31)

== Major wins ==
2019
Stage 1 PRUride Philippines, Ismael Grospe Jr.
Stage 3 Tour de Singkarak, Ismael Grospe Jr.
Stage 5 Tour de Singkarak, Jonel Carcueva
2020
Stage 3 Cambodia Bay Cycling Tour, Ronnilan Quita
