= Nícolas Sessler =

Brazilian cyclist (born 1994)

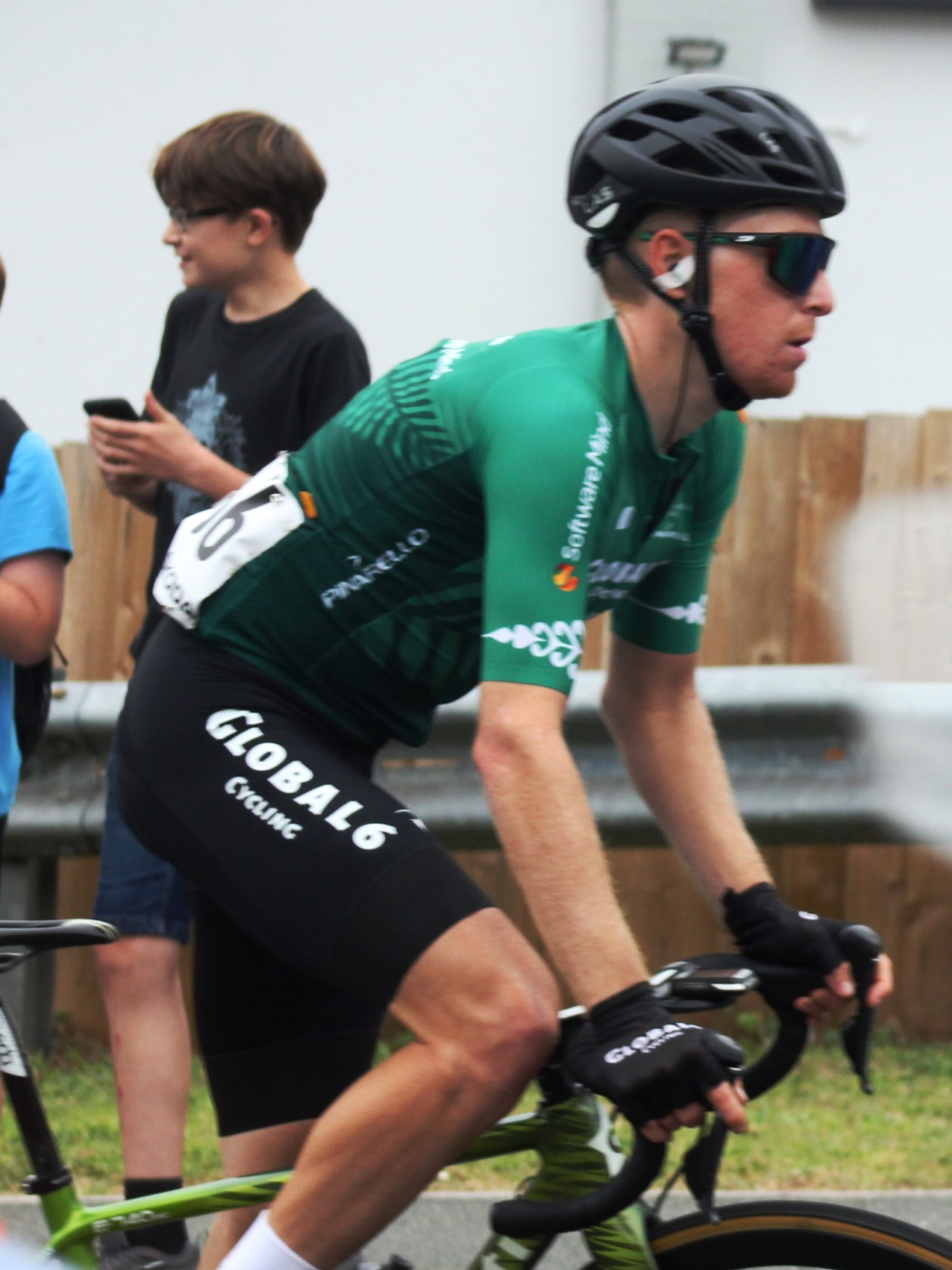
- Sessler at the 2021 Tour of Britain

Personal information
- Full name: Nícolas Mariotto Sessler
- Born: 29 April 1994 (age 32) Ribeirão Preto, Brazil
- Height: 1.69 m (5 ft 7 in)
- Weight: 58 kg (128 lb)

Cycling career
- Sport: Cycling
- Current team: Victoria Sports Pro Cycling
- Discipline: Road
- Role: Rider
- Rider type: Climber

Amateur teams
- 2015: Dovy Keukens FCC
- 2016: VL Technics–Experza–Abutriek
- 2017: Lizarte

Professional teams
- 2017: Israel Cycling Academy (stagiaire)
- 2018–2020: Burgos BH
- 2021–2023: Global 6 Cycling
- 2024–: Victoria Sports Pro Cycling Team

Nícolas Mariotto Sessler (born 29 April 1994) is a Brazilian cyclist, who currently rides for UCI Continental team Victoria Sports Pro Cycling.

== Major results ==
2016
1st Overall Vuelta a la Provincia de Valencia

1st Stage 3

6th Overall Kreiz Breizh Elites

1st Young rider classification

2017
1st Overall Volta a Lleida
2023
5th Road race, Pan American Games
5th Road race, National Road Championships
6th Road race, Pan American Road Championships
2024
1st Overall Tour of Salalah

1st Stage 2

4th Overall Belgrade Banjaluka
5th Overall Tour of Routhe Salvation
6th Oita Urban Classic
9th Clásica Terres de l'Ebre
