= Red Walters =

Grenadian cyclist (born 1999)

Personal information
- Born: 19 January 1999 (age 27) London, England
- Height: 1.81 m (5 ft 11 in)

Cycling career
- Sport: Cycling
- Current team: Óbidos Cycling Team
- Discipline: Road
- Role: Rider

Amateur teams
- 2018: Sotonia CC
- 2020: Nopinz Symec
- 2021: CC Plancoëtin
- 2025–: Óbidos Cycling Team

Professional teams
- 2019: Vitus Pro Cycling Team p/b Brother UK
- 2021: Hagens Berman Axeon (stagiaire)
- 2022: Ribble Weldtite
- 2023–2024: XSpeed United Continental
Medal record
Men's road bicycle racing
Representing Grenada
Pan American Championships
Silver medal – second place	2024 São José dos Campos	Road race

Red Walters (born 19 January 1999) is a British-born Grenadian cyclist, who currently rides for club team Óbidos Cycling Team.

== Personal life ==
Walters was born in England to an English father and Grenadian mother, and represent Grenada internationally.

== Major results ==
2021
3rd Road race, Caribbean Road Championships
2022
National Road Championships

1st Road race
1st Time trial

2nd Time trial, Caribbean Road Championships
2023
National Road Championships

1st Road race
1st Time trial

1st Stage 4 Tour of Bulgaria
Caribbean Road Championships

3rd Road race
10th Time trial

6th Hong Kong Challenge
8th Overall In the footsteps of the Romans
2024
National Road Championships

1st Road race
1st Time trial

2nd Road race, Pan American Road Championships
2025
National Road Championships

1st Road race
1st Time trial
