= Matys Grisel =

French cyclist

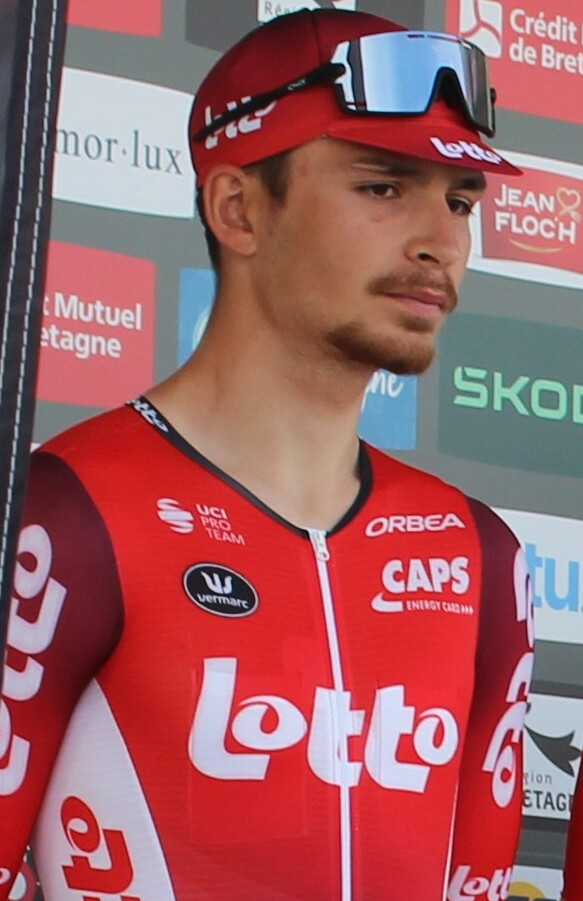
- Grisel in 2025

Personal information
- Born: 14 July 2005 (age 21) Creil, France

Cycling career
- Sport: Cycling
- Current team: Lotto–Intermarché
- Discipline: Road
- Role: Rider
- Rider type: Puncheur; Classics specialist

Amateur team
- 2022–2023: AG2R Citroën U19 Team

Professional teams
- 2024–2025: Lotto–Dstny Development Team
- 2026–: Lotto–Intermarché
Medal record
Representing France
Men's road bicycle racing
European Championships
Silver medal – second place	2023 Drenthe	Junior road race

Matys Grisel (born 14 July 2005) is a French professional road cyclist, who currently rides for UCI WorldTeam Lotto–Intermarché.

== Major results ==
2022
1st Stage 2a (TTT) Aubel–Thimister–Stavelot
2nd Road race, National Junior Championships
4th Overall Trophée Centre Morbihan

1st Young rider classification

10th Paris–Roubaix Juniors
2023
1st Paris–Roubaix Juniors
1st Stage 2 Saarland Trofeo
1st Stage 3 Course de la Paix Juniors
2nd Road race, UEC European Junior Championships
4th Overall Watersley Junior Challenge

1st Points classification
1st Stage 2

4th Kuurne–Brussels–Kuurne Juniors
4th Nokere Koerse Juniors
8th Overall SPIE Internationale Juniorendriedaagse
8th La Route des Géants
2024
1st Overall Tour de Namur

1st Stage 1

1st Stage 5 Tour de Bretagne
2nd Omloop Het Nieuwsblad U23
7th Dorpenomloop Rucphen
9th Tour des 100 Communes
2025
2nd La Monts et Châteaux Classic
3rd Brussel-Opwijk
5th GP Rik Van Looy
5th Grand Prix de la Ville de Lillers
6th Tour des 100 Communes
8th Grand Prix Cerami
8th IXINA Classic
2026 (2 pro wins)
1st Overall Tour de Taiwan

1st Stage 3

1st Tour des 100 Communes
2nd Grand Prix de la Ville de Lillers
3rd La Roue Tourangelle
4th Paris–Tours
6th Le Samyn
9th Classique Dunkerque
9th Route Adélie
