= Jonel Carcueva =

Filipino road cyclist

Personal information
- Full name: Jonel Pansacala Carcueva
- Born: 23 May 1995 (age 31) Minglanilla, Philippines
- Height: 1.65 m (5 ft 5 in)
- Weight: 51 kg (112 lb)

Cycling career
- Sport: Cycling
- Current team: Go for Gold Philippines
- Discipline: Road
- Role: Rider

Amateur team
- 2017–2018: Team Go for Gold

Professional team
- 2019–: Team Go for Gold
Medal record
Representing Philippines
Men's road bicycle racing
Southeast Asian Games
Bronze medal – third place	2019 Tagaytay	Team road race

Jonel Pansacala Carcueva (born May 23, 1995) is a Filipino professional cyclist who rides for UCI Continental team Go for Gold Philippines, of which he has been part of since 2017.

Carcueva has won the road race at the Philippine National Championships for three consecutive years, from 2022 to 2024. His win in 2024 guaranteed him a spot in the national road team participating in the Asian Championships 2024 and the Southeast Asian Games, slated for December 2025 in Thailand.

Carcueva was part of the Philippine delegation that participated in the 19th Asian Games in 2023. He also competed in the 30th Southeast Asian Games in 2019.

== Major results ==
2018
7th Overall Tour de Singkarak
2019
Southeast Asian Games

3rd Team road race
7th Road race

5th Overall Tour de Singkarak

1st Stage 5

7th Overall Tour de Ijen
7th Overall Tour de Siak
8th Overall PRUride Philippines
2022
1st Road race, National Road Championships
2023
1st Road race, National Road Championships
2024
1st Road race, National Road Championships
