= Liudui Hakka Cultural Park =

Cultural center in Neipu, Pingtung County, Taiwan

- 六堆客家文化園區
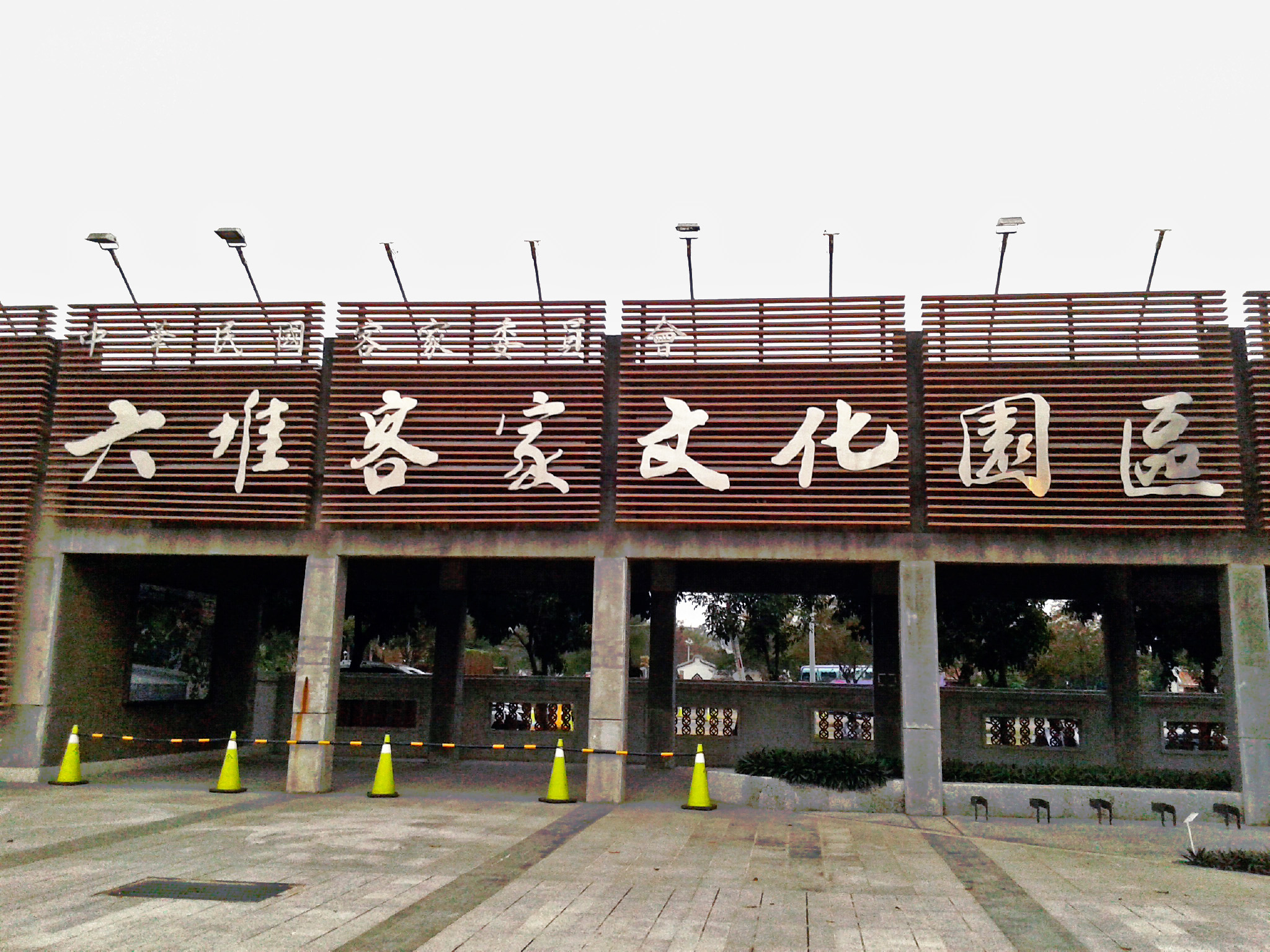
- Interactive map of the Liudui Hakka Cultural Park area

General information
- Type: cultural center
- Location: Neipu, Pingtung County, Taiwan
- Coordinates: 22°39′33.8″N 120°33′31.8″E
- Completed: 1961
- Opened: 22 October 2011
- Owner: Hakka Affairs Council

Technical details
- Grounds: 30 hectares

Website
- Official website

The Liudui Hakka Cultural Park (traditional Chinese: 六堆客家文化園區; simplified Chinese: 六堆客家文化园区; pinyin: Liùduī Kèjiā Wénhuà Yuánqū) is a cultural center in Neipu Township, Pingtung County, Taiwan about Hakka people.

== History ==
The park was originally a tobacco barn area which was constructed in 1961. In 2009, the owner decided to donate the area and facilities. The area was then converted to Liudui Hakka Cultural Park and was opened on 22 October 2011.

== Attractions ==
Liudui Hakka Cultural Parks has an area of 30 hectares, which contains several attractions:

- Hakka Settlement Architecture
- Nine Flowers Garden Area
- Seasonal Farmland Area
- Natural Prairie Area
- Hakka Ditch Area
- Auditorium
- Wooden Trail
- Headspring Plaza
- Wetland Garden
- Countryside Area
- Poolside Stage

== Exhibition Hall ==
- Permanent Exhibition
- Permanent Exhibition - Hakkaland Children’s Museum
- Multimedia Exhibition Hall
- Tobacco Barn Exhibition Hall
- Rice Mill Exhibition Hall

== Transportation ==
The park is accessible by bus from Pingtung Station of Taiwan Railway.

== See also ==
- List of tourist attractions in Taiwan
