= Filipino National Road Championships =

Road cycling championships

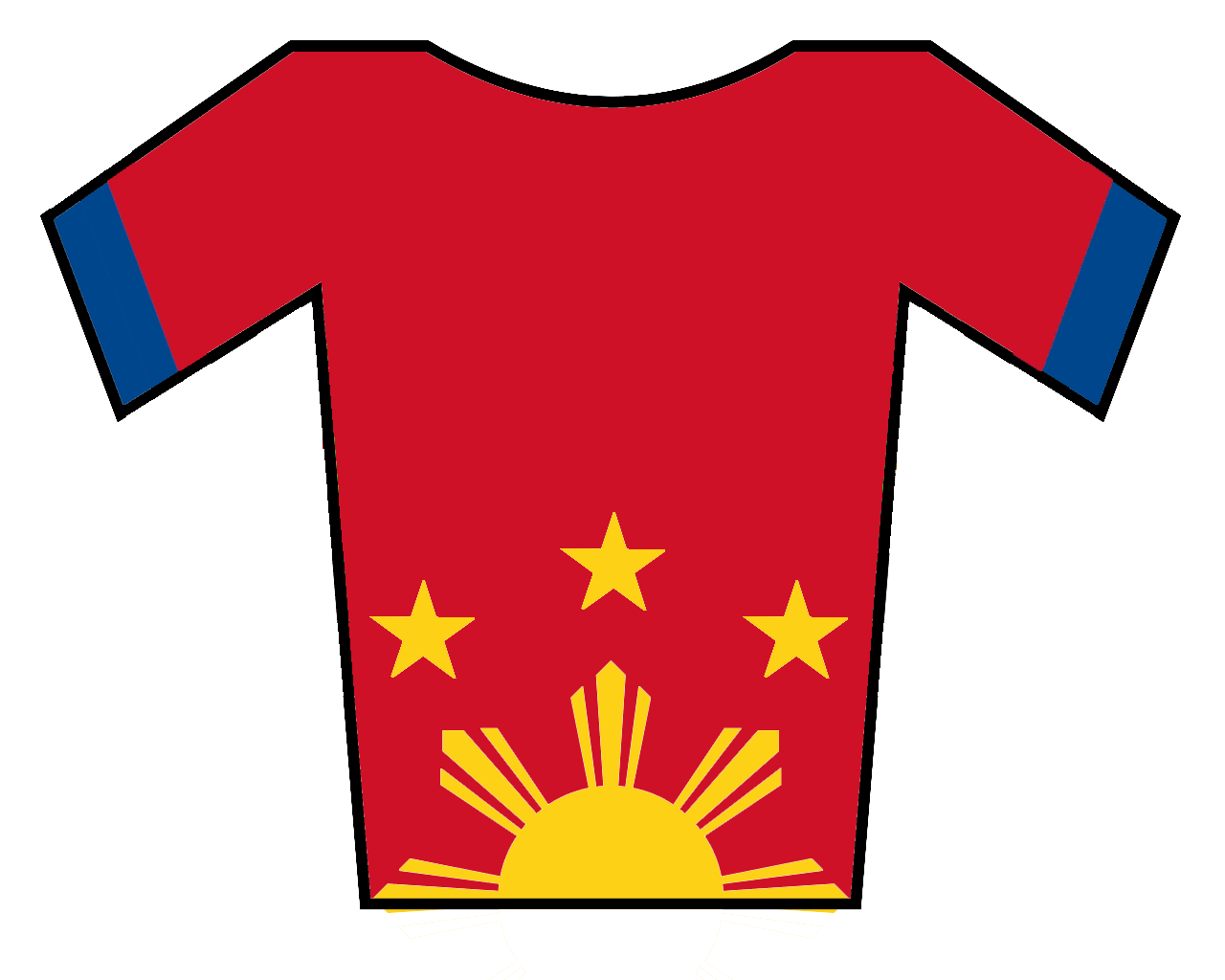

Race details
- Date: June
- Discipline: Road
- Type: One-day race

The Filipino National Road Championships are held annually to decide the cycling champions in both the road race and time trial discipline, across various categories.

== Men ==
=== Road race ===
| Year | Winner | Second | Third |
|---|---|---|---|
| 2010 | Eusebio Quiñones | Dante Cagas | Warren Davadilla |
| 2013 | Rustom Lim | Ronald Oranza | Denver Casayuran |
| 2015 | Jhon Mark Camingao | Mark Galedo | Marcelo Felipe |
| 2018 | Jan Paul Morales | Ronald Oranza | Marcelo Felipe |
| 2019 | Marcelo Felipe | Ronald Oranza | Mark Galedo |
| 2020– 2021 | Not held due to the COVID-19 pandemic in the Philippines |
| 2022 | Jonel Carcueva | Marcelo Felipe | Jhon Mark Camingao |
| 2023 | Jonel Carcueva | Jericho Lucero | Jaypee Olarte |
| 2024 | Jonel Carcueva | Jericho Lucero | Ronald Lomotos |
| 2025 | Marcelo Felipe | Jericho Lucero | Jeremy Lizardo |
| 2026 | Ronnilan Quita | Ismael Grospe Jr. | Jericho Lucero |

=== Time trial ===
| Year | Winner | Second | Third |
|---|---|---|---|
| 2010 | Merculio Ramos | Lloyd Reynante | Tomas Martinez |
| 2013 | Ronald Oranza | Rustom Lim | Baler Ravina |
| 2015 | Ronald Oranza | Mark Galedo | Marcelo Felipe |
| 2018 | Mark Galedo | George Oconer | Rustom Lim |
| 2019 (Note: Nichol Pareja recorded the fastest time, but was only eligible for under-23 honours.) | Mark Galedo | Jonel Carcueva | Marcelo Felipe |
| 2020 | Not held due to the COVID-19 pandemic in the Philippines |
| 2021 | Mark Galedo | Jhon Mark Camingao | Joey delos Reyes |
| 2022 | Mark Galedo | Ronald Oranza | Jhon Mark Camingao |
| 2023 | Rustom Lim | Gilbert Valdez | Jhonrey Buccat |
| 2024 | Nichol Blanca Pareja | Joshua Pascual | Alexis Pagara |
| 2025 | Nash Lim | Nichol Blanca Pareja | Jhon Mark Camingao |
| 2026 | Nash Lim | Ronald Oranza | Nichol Blanca Pareja |

== Women ==
| Year | Road race | Time trial |
| 2015 | Jermyn Prado | |
| 2016 | | |
| 2017 | | |
| 2018 | Jermyn Prado | Jermyn Prado |
| 2019 | Marella Salamat | Jermyn Prado |
| 2020 | Not held due to the COVID-19 pandemic in the Philippines | |
| 2021 | | Kate Velasco |
| 2022 | Jermyn Prado | Jermyn Prado |
| 2023 | Jermyn Prado | Jermyn Prado |
| 2024 | Mathilda Krog | Jermyn Prado |
| 2025 | Jermyn Prado | Jermyn Prado |
| 2026 | Phoebe Salazar | Mary Joyce Monton |
