= Lotto–Intermarché =

Belgian cycling team

Team information
- UCI code: LOI
- Registered: Belgium
- Founded: 1985
- Discipline: Road
- Status: UCI WorldTeam (2005–2022); UCI ProTeam (2023–2025); UCI WorldTeam (2026-)
- Bicycles: Orbea
- Components: Shimano
- Website: Team home page

Key personnel
- General manager: Stéphane Heulot
- Team manager: Marc Sergeant

Team name history
1985	Lotto
1986	Lotto-Emerxil–Merckx
1986 (Note: From July)	Joker–Emerxil–Merckx
1987	Lotto–Merckx
1987 (Note: From July)	Joker–Merckx
1988	Lotto
1988–1989	Lotto–Vlaanderen–Jong–Mbk–Merckx
1990	Lotto–Superclub
1991	Lotto
1992	Lotto–Mavic–MBK
1993–1994	Lotto
1995	Lotto–Isoglass
1996	Lotto
1997	Lotto–Mobistar–Isoglass
1998–1999	Lotto–Mobistar
2000–2002	Lotto–Adecco
2003–2004	Lotto–Domo (LOT)
2005–2006	Davitamon–Lotto (DVL)
2007	Predictor–Lotto (PRL)
2008–2009	Silence–Lotto (SIL)
2010–2011	Omega Pharma–Lotto (OLO)
2012–2014	Lotto–Belisol (LTB)
2015–2022	Lotto–Soudal (LTS) (Note: For the 2016 Paris–Nice, 2017 Paris–Nice, 2018 Giro d'Italia, and 2019 Tour de Pologne, the name Lotto Fix All was used.)
2023–2024	Lotto–Dstny (LTD)
2025	Lotto (LOT)
2026	Lotto-Intermarché (LOI)
Lotto–Intermarché jersey
Jersey

Lotto–Intermarché (UCI team code: LOI) is a Belgian professional cycling team at UCI WorldTour level sponsored by the Belgian lottery and Intermarché. The same organisations also sponsor a women's cycling team, Lotto–Intermarché Ladies.

== History ==
=== Sponsorship ===
Lotto has a long history of cycling sponsorship, they began sponsoring 1984 with Tönissteiner–Lotto–Mavic–Pecotex. In 1985, it became prime sponsor of a team bearing only its name. Walter Godefroot and Patrick Lefevere were early directeurs sportifs.

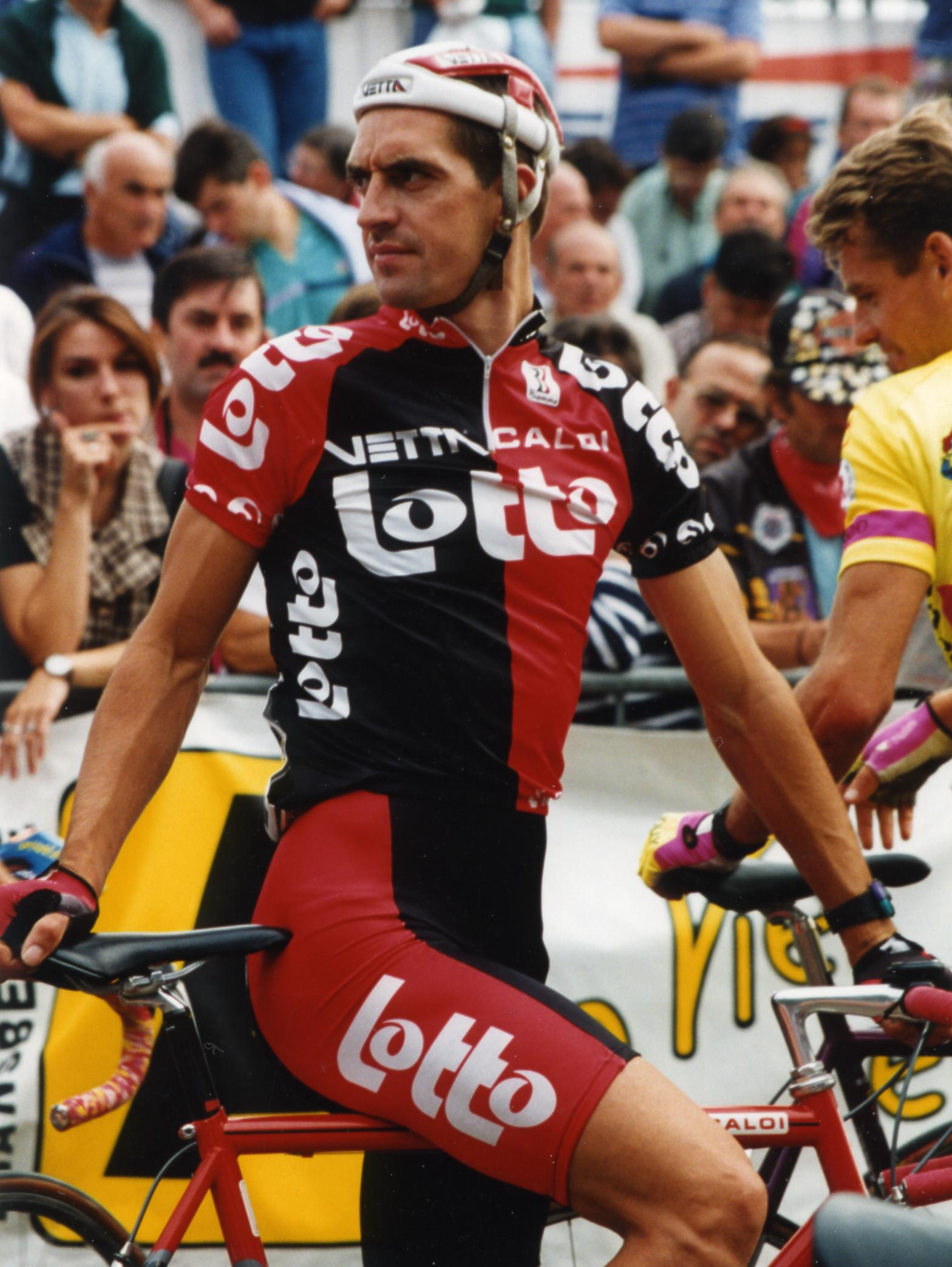
Peter De Clercq in a Lotto jersey in 1994

The fusion of the Lotto–Adecco and Domo–Farm Frites teams for the start of the 2003 season created the current team and structure in the guise of Lotto–Domo.

Omega Pharma had previously been a co-sponsor of the Quick-Step–Davitamon team in 2003 and 2004. Omega Pharma became the main sponsors in 2005, under their Davitamon brand name. The team name switched to Omega Pharma's Predictor brand name in 2007 and the Silence brand in 2008. From 2010 the team became known as Omega Pharma–Lotto, but this sponsor moved their financial support to the Quick-Step setup for the 2012 season.

Belisol became co-sponsors in 2012, and are a Belgian company making windows and doors and solar panels.

On the final day of the 2014 Tour de France the team announced that they had secured new sponsorship for the team with Soudal, manufacturers of sealants, adhesives and foams. Soudal signed a deal lasting six seasons, the team name becoming Lotto Soudal: in 2019, they extended the deal for two more years. Lotto continue to sponsor the team, as well as the women's team and under-23 team.

For one stage race each year since 2016 (at the 2016 Paris–Nice, 2017 Paris–Nice, 2018 Giro d'Italia, and 2019 Tour de Pologne), the team raced under the name Lotto Fix ALL and changed the team kit to a grey colour to reflect one of Soudal's key brands.

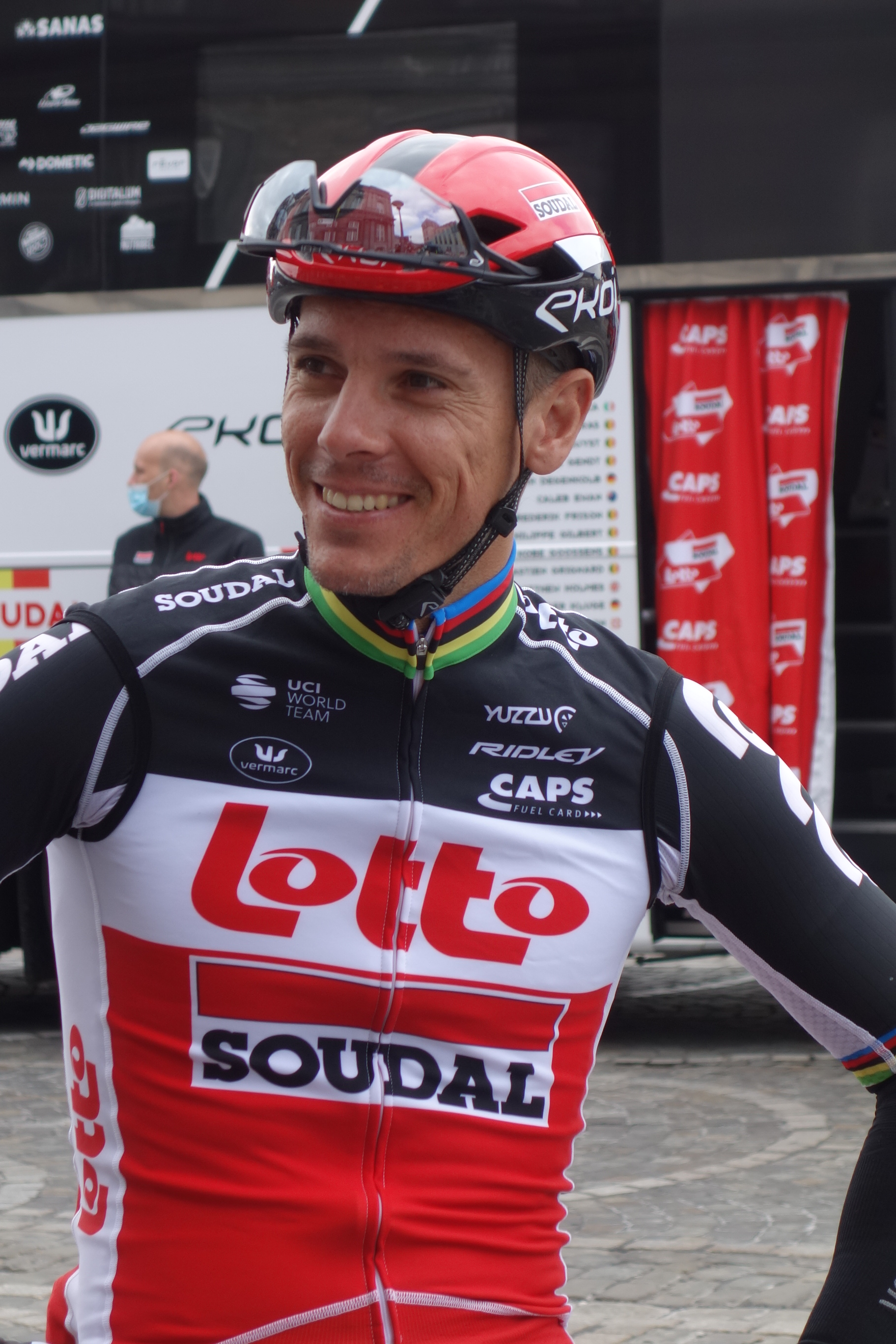
Philippe Gilbert at the 2021 Liège–Bastogne–Liège

=== Tour status ===
Lotto–Intermarché was a member team of the UCI World Tour from its inception in 2009 until the end of the 2022 season. The team was relegated from the World Tour at the end of 2022 after finishing 19th in the points standings for the 2020 - 2022 qualification cycle. The top 18 teams qualified for the 2023 - 2025 cycle, meaning that from 2023 the team dropped down a division and began racing under a UCI ProTeam licence. Among non-World Tour teams, Lotto finished first in the 2022 one-year points list ahead of TotalEnergies, meaning it received wildcards for all 2023 World Tour stage and one-day races.

=== Current team structure ===
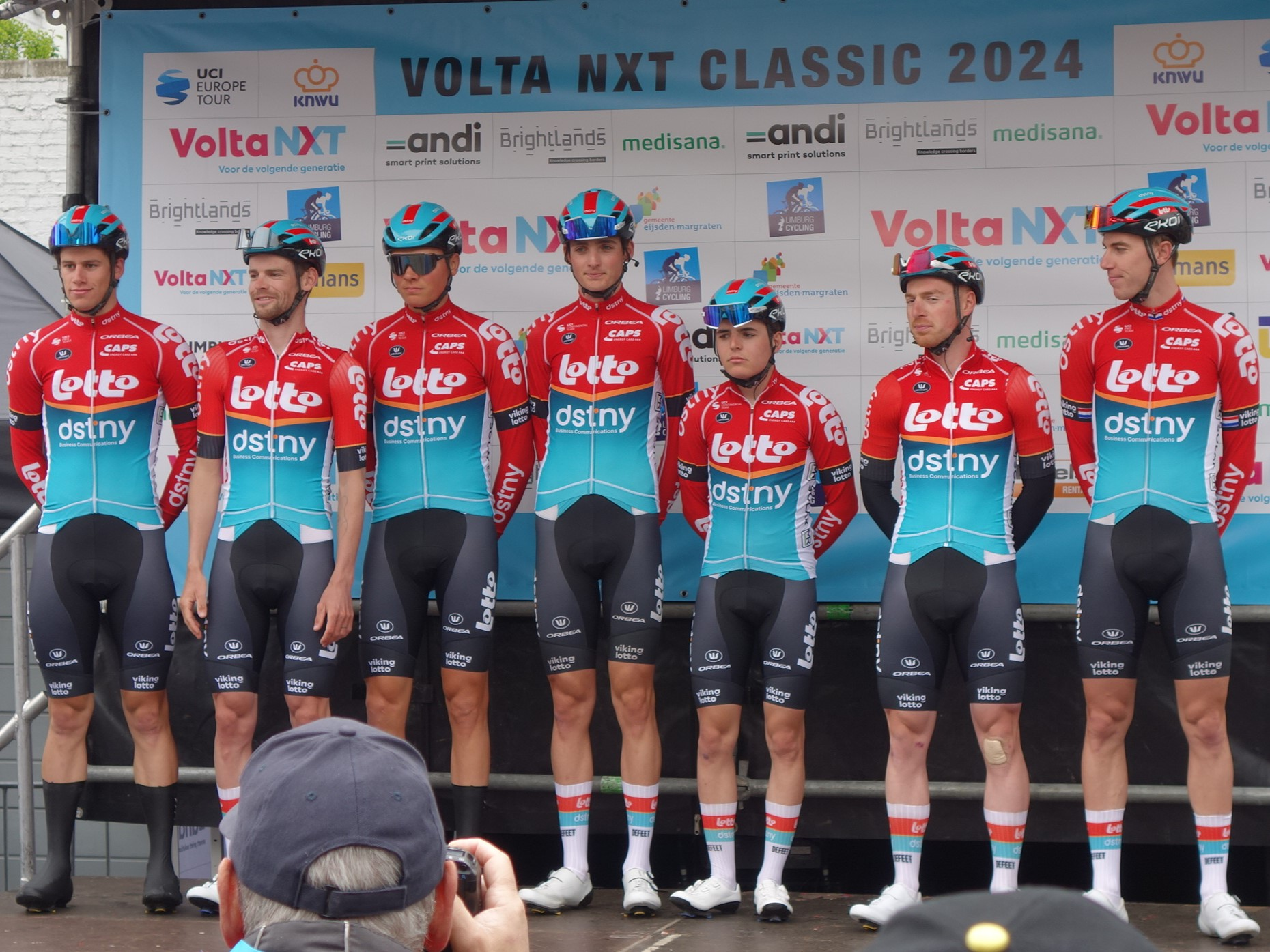
The Lotto Dstny team in 2024

The team is managed by Marc Sergeant and Bill Olivier and they are assisted by Herman Frison, Jean-Pierre Heynderickx, Bart Leysen, Marc Wauters, Mario Aerts, Dirk Demol and Michiel Elijzen.

After Tosh Van der Sande accidentally listed the wrong nasal spray brand in the paperwork at the 2018 Six Days of Ghent where he returned a positive test for prednisolone, a substance found in the nasal spray Sofrasolone, he was temporarily suspended by the team. Van der Sande was later cleared of any wrongdoing by the UCI.

== Team roster ==
As of 21 May 2026.

Rider	Date of birth
Toon Aerts (BEL)	19 October 1993 (age 32)
Huub Artz (NED)	14 May 2002 (age 24)
Jenno Berckmoes (BEL)	4 February 2001 (age 25)
Cédric Beullens (BEL)	27 January 1997 (age 29)
Vito Braet (BEL)	2 November 2000 (age 25)
Lars Craps (BEL)	17 October 2001 (age 24)
Jasper De Buyst (BEL)	24 November 1993 (age 32)
Arnaud De Lie (BEL)	16 March 2002 (age 24)
Steffen De Schuyteneer (BEL)	24 February 2005 (age 21)
Matthew Fox (AUS)	28 September 2002 (age 23)
Joshua Giddings (GBR)	20 July 2003 (age 23)
Sébastien Grignard (BEL)	29 April 1999 (age 27)
Matys Grisel (FRA)	14 July 2005 (age 21)
Simone Gualdi (ITA)	16 April 2005 (age 21)
Mathieu Kockelmann (LUX)	31 January 2004 (age 22)

Rider	Date of birth
Milan Menten (BEL)	31 October 1996 (age 29)
Robin Orins (BEL)	6 March 2002 (age 24)
Lorenzo Rota (ITA)	23 May 1995 (age 31)
Jonas Rutsch (GER)	24 January 1998 (age 28)
Liam Slock (BEL)	18 September 2000 (age 25)
Lionel Taminiaux (BEL)	19 May 1996 (age 30)
Reuben Thompson (NZL)	15 February 2001 (age 25)
Luca Van Boven (BEL)	6 January 2000 (age 26)
Taco van der Hoorn (NED)	4 December 1993 (age 32)
Lennert Van Eetvelt (BEL)	17 July 2001 (age 25)
Roel van Sintmaartensdijk (NED)	8 May 2001 (age 25)
Baptiste Veistroffer (FRA)	29 May 2000 (age 26)
Jarno Widar (BEL)	13 November 2005 (age 20)
Georg Zimmermann (GER)	11 October 1997 (age 28)
Felix Ørn-Kristoff (NOR)	15 March 2006 (age 20)

== National champions ==
1985
Belgian Road Race, Paul Haghedooren
1986
Belgian Road Race, Marc Sergeant
1988
Belgian Track (Individual Pursuit), Benjamin Van Itterbeeck
1990
Belgian Road Race, Claude Criquielion
1992
Belgian Road Race, Johan Museeuw
1995
Belgian Road Race, Wilfried Nelissen
2000
Belgian Time Trial, Rik Verbrugghe
2002
Australian Road Race, Robbie McEwen
Dutch Road Race, Stefan van Dijk
2005
Australian Road Race, Robbie McEwen
Belgian Road Race, Serge Baguet
Dutch Road Race, Léon van Bon
2007
Belgian Time Trial, Leif Hoste
2008
Australian Road Race, Matthew Lloyd
Belgian Road Race, Jürgen Roelandts
2009
World Road Race, Cadel Evans
2011
Belgian Road Race, Philippe Gilbert
Belgian Time Trial, Philippe Gilbert
2013
German Road Race, André Greipel
2014
German Road Race, André Greipel
Belgian Road Race, Jens Debusschere
2015
Belgian Time Trial, Jurgen van den Broeck
2016
German Road Race, André Greipel
2018
Belgian Time Trial, Victor Campenaerts
2024
New Zealand Time Trial, Logan Currie
Belgian Road Race, Arnaud De Lie
