= Liyu Lake =

Lake in Shoufeng, Hualien County, Taiwan

- Fanaw (Amis)
- 鯉魚潭 (Chinese)
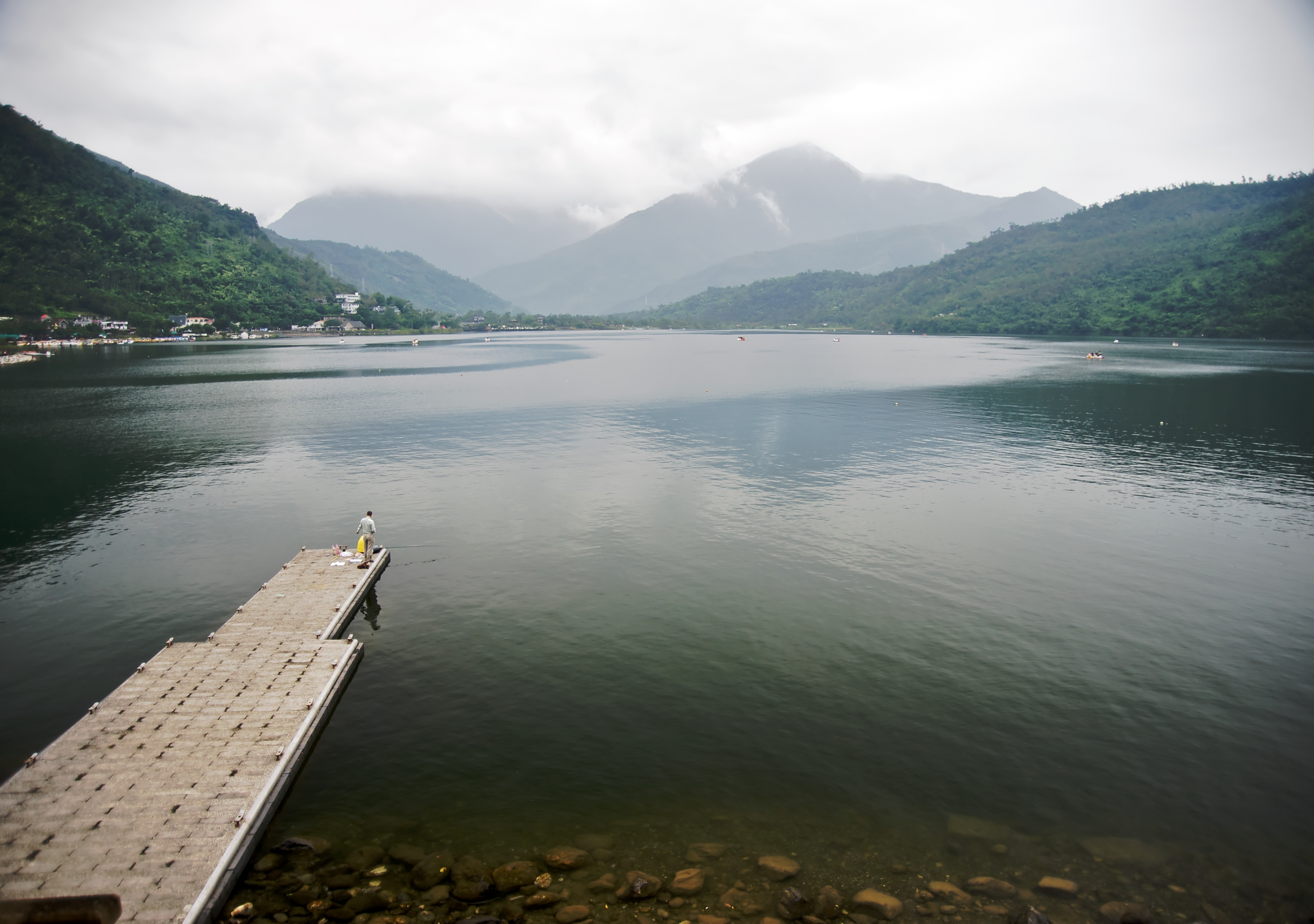

- Location within Hualien County
- Location: Shoufeng, Hualien County, Taiwan
- Coordinates: 23°55′43.5″N 121°30′35.6″E
- Type: lake
- Max. length: 1.6 kilometres (0.99 mi)
- Max. width: 930 meters (3,050 ft)
- Surface area: 104 hectares (260 acres)

The Liyu Lake or Fanaw (traditional Chinese: 鯉魚潭; simplified Chinese: 鲤鱼潭; pinyin: Lǐyú Tán; Amis language: Fanaw 法那奧) is a lake in Chinan Village, Shoufeng Township, Hualien County, Taiwan.

== Name ==
Liyu 鯉魚 means carp in English where by the name, the lake has a lot of carps. The name itself originated from the Liyu Mountain beside the lake. The Pangcah/Amis name of the lake means pool of water.

== Geography ==
The lake is about 1.6 km in length and 930 meters in width, making it the largest inland lake in Hualien County with a total area of 104 hectares. The lake is located at the foot of Mount Liyu.

== Features ==
After the development of the lake into a scenic spot, the lake becomes the site of various recreational activities, such as light boat sailing, water sports, etc. It has single lane bicycle path around 5 km encircling the lake and footpaths for strolling along the shore. The Chinan National Forest Recreation Area (Chinese: 池南國家森林遊樂區) and Mukumugi (Chinese: 慕谷慕魚) surrounding the lake displays the old logging trains and the logging displays and aboriginal culture respectively. Every year in April, thousand of fireflies flash above the lake.

== Transportation ==
The lake is accessible by bus towards Shoufeng from Hualien Station of Taiwan Railway.
