= Roadbike Philippines =

Filipino cycling team

- Main team logo

Team information
- UCI code: 7RP
- Registered: Philippines
- Discipline: Road
- Status: UCI Continental

Key personnel
- General manager: Pablito Sual
- Team managers: Ric Rodriguez; Noel Baltazar; Clark Bisda; Roland Zamora

Team name history
- 2012 2013 2014–2015 2016 2017 2018 2019–2023 2024-: 7 Eleven Presented Philippines; Team 7 Eleven Presented By Road Bike Philippines; Team 7 Eleven Road Bike Philippines; 7 Eleven–Sava RBP; 7 Eleven Roadbike Philippines; 7 Eleven–Cliqq Roadbike Philippines; 7 Eleven–Cliqq–air21 by Roadbike Philippines; 7 Eleven–Cliqq Roadbike Philippines

Roadbike Philippines, also known as 7 Eleven–Cliqq–air21 by Roadbike Philippines (UCI team code: 7RP) for sponsorship reasons with 7-Eleven and Airfreight 2100, Inc., is a Philippine UCI Continental cycling team managed by Ric Rodriguez and sponsored by 7-Eleven.

In 2019, a women's and under-23 team was formed by Roadbike Philippines to complement the men's elite team.

In 2016, the 7 Eleven–Sava RBP team represented the country in the Tour de Langkawi, after a long hiatus.

== Team roster ==
As of September 3, 2026.

Rider	Date of birth
Jonel Carcueva (PHI)	May 23, 1995 (age 31)
Mervin Corpuz (PHI)	August 26, 1997 (age 29)
James Escumbien (PHI)	September 11, 2005 (age 20)
Daniel Guld (DEN)	December 9, 2000 (age 25)
Jonty Harris (DEN)	August 30, 2003 (age 23)
Antoine Huby (FRA)	January 19, 2001 (age 25)
Nikita Kirzhaykin (RUS)	October 4, 1993 (age 32)

Rider	Date of birth
James Krzanich (NZL)	May 22, 1999 (age 27)
Cormac McGeough (IRL)	August 11, 1996 (age 30)
Jaypee Olarte (PHI)	August 16, 1999 (age 27)
Ronnilan Quita (PHI)	January 23, 1995 (age 31)
Oliver Scott (NZL)	December 23, 2006 (age 19)
Matthew Sherwin (AUS)	November 11, 1985 (age 40)
Daniel Yon Hin (MRI)	May 8, 2002 (age 24)

== Major wins ==
2013
Southeast Asian Games Jr ITT, Mark Galedo
2014
Overall, Le Tour de Filipinas, Mark Galedo

Stage 2, Mark Galedo

2016
Stage 1 Jelajah Malaysia, Rustom Lim
2017
Stage 4 Tour de Flores, Edgar Nohales Nieto
2019
Overall, PRUride PH, Marcelo Felipe
Stage 2 Ronda Pilipinas, Marcelo Felipe
Stage 6 Tour de Singkarak, Rustom Lim
