= Mark Galedo =

Filipino racing cyclist

Personal information
- Full name: Mark John Lexer Galedo
- Born: Mark John Lexer Galedo Guevarra; November 11, 1985 (age 40)
- Height: 1.60 m (5 ft 3 in)
- Weight: 58 kg (128 lb)

Cycling career
- Sport: Cycling
- Current team: Retired
- Discipline: Road
- Role: Rider

Amateur teams
- 2012: 7 Eleven Presented Philippines
- 2019: Celeste Cycles–Bianchi PH

Professional teams
- 2013–2018: 7 Eleven Presented by Road Bike Philippines
- 2019–2024: 7 Eleven–Cliqq–air21 by Roadbike Philippines

Major wins
- Tour de Filipinas (2014)
Medal record
Men's road cycling
Representing Philippines
Southeast Asian Games
Gold medal – first place	2013 Naypyidaw	Individual time trial
Silver medal – second place	2011 Jakarta–Palembang	Road race
Bronze medal – third place	2013 Naypyidaw	Team road race
Bronze medal – third place	2011 Jakarta–Palembang	Individual time trial
Bronze medal – third place	2011 Jakarta–Palembang	Team time trial

Mark John Lexer Galedo (born September 11, 1985) is a Filipino former road bicycle racer, who competed as a professional for UCI Continental team 7 Eleven–Cliqq–air21 by Roadbike Philippines from 2013 to June 2024.

Galedo was inspired to take up cycling after he watched Victor Espiritu finish, as the 1996 Marlboro Tour (now the Tour de Filipinas) champion.

== Personal life ==
Galedo formerly had Guevarra as his last name but discontinued using it in competitions after his father abandoned their family.

Associated with Caloocan, Galedo is a former car-painter and kitchen helper. He also runs a bicycle shop in Mandaluyong with his wife.

== Major results ==
2009
1st Overall Tour of Luzon
2011
Southeast Asian Games

2nd Road race
3rd Time trial
3rd Team time trial

2012
1st Overall Ronda Pilipinas
6th Overall Tour de Filipinas
10th Overall Tour of Vietnam
2013
Southeast Asian Games

1st Time trial
3rd Team road race

7th Overall Tour de Filipinas
9th Overall Jelajah Malaysia
10th Overall Tour of Borneo
2014
1st Overall Tour de Filipinas

1st Stage 2

2015
National Road Championships

2nd Road race
2nd Time trial

2nd Overall Tour de Filipinas
3rd Overall Tour of Borneo
6th Time trial, Southeast Asian Games
2016
4th Overall Jelajah Malaysia
2018
1st Time trial, National Road Championships
6th Overall Tour de Filipinas
2019
1st Overall Tour of Guam
6th Time trial, Southeast Asian Games
2022
1st Time trial, National Road Championships
10th Time trial, Southeast Asian Games
