= Neipu =

Rural township in Pingtung County, Taiwan

Coordinates: 22°39′0″N 120°35′15″E

Neipu Township 內埔鄉
- Rural township
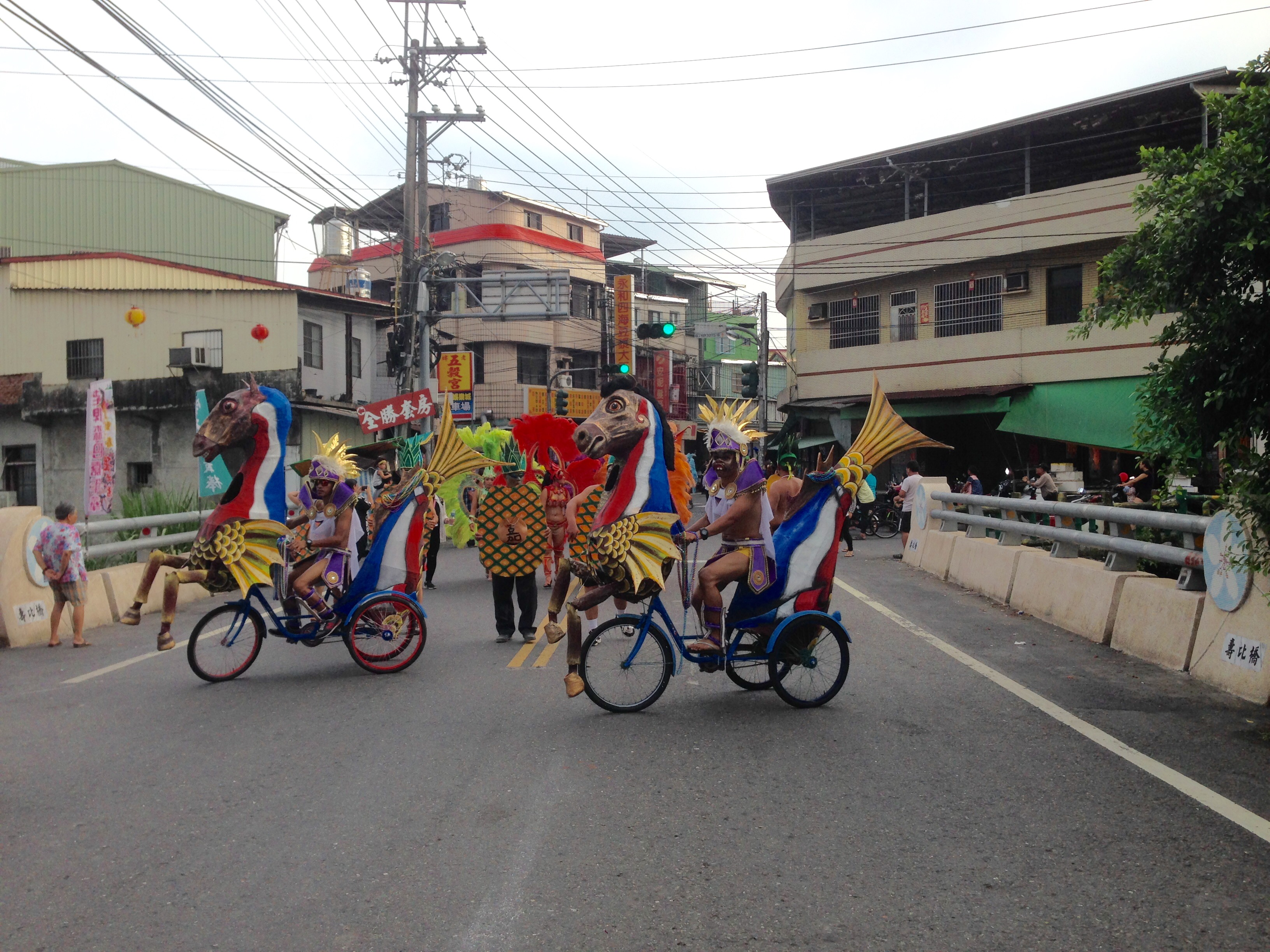

- Neipu Township in Pingtung County
- Location: Pingtung County, Taiwan

Area
  - Total: 82 km^{2} (32 sq mi)

Population (February 2024)
  - Total: 52,504
  - Density: 640/km^{2} (1,700/sq mi)

Neipu Township
- Traditional Chinese: 內埔鄉
- Hanyu Pinyin: Nèipǔ Xiāng
- Wade–Giles: Nei^{4}-p'u^{3} Hsiang^{1}
- Pha̍k-fa-sṳ: Lui-phû-hiông
- Hokkien POJ: Lāi-po͘-hiong

Neipu Township is a rural township in Pingtung County, Taiwan.

== Geography ==
- Area: 81.86 square kilometres (31.61 sq mi)
- Population: 52,504 (February 2024)

== Administrative divisions ==
The township comprises 23 villages: Ailiao, Daxin, Fengtian, Futian, Hexing, Jianxing, Laobei, Liming, Longquan, Longtan, Meihe, Neipu, Neitian, Shangshu, Shuimen, Tungning, Tungpian, Tungshi, Xingnan, Yiting, Zhenfeng, Zhonglin and Zhuwei.

== Education ==
- Meiho University
- National Pingtung University of Science and Technology
- Nei-Pu Elementary School

== Tourist attractions ==
- Liudui Hakka Cultural Park

== Notable natives ==
- Wu Pao-chun, baker
