= Tegshbayar Batsaikhan =

Mongolian cyclist (born 1998)

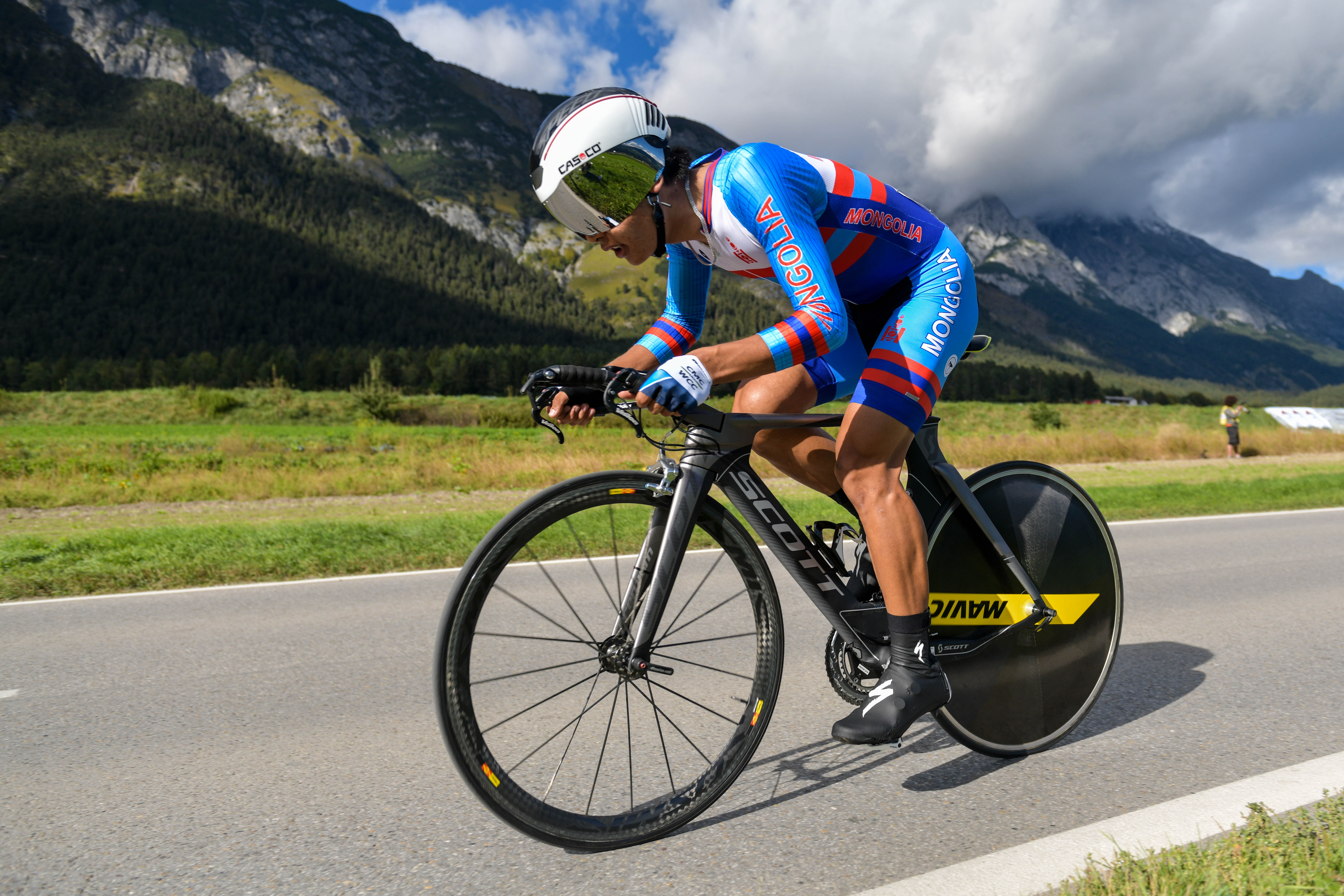

Personal information
- Born: 1 June 1998 (age 28) Sükhbaatar Province, Mongolia

Cycling career
- Sport: Cycling
- Current team: Roojai Insurance Winspace
- Disciplines: Road; Track
- Role: Rider

Amateur team
- 2016–2018: World Cycling Centre

Professional teams
- 2018: RTS Racing Team
- 2019–2020: Ferei Pro Cycling
- 2022: Ferei Mongolia Development Team
- 2023–: Roojai Online Insurance
Medal record
Men's track cycling
Representing Mongolia
Asian Championships
Silver medal – second place	2019 Jakarta	Scratch
Wоrld Junior Championships
Gold medal – first place	2016 Aigle	Scratch

Tegshbayar Batsaikhan (Mongolian: Тэгшбаяр Батсайханы; born 1 June 1998) is a Mongolian cyclist, who currently rides for UCI Continental team Roojai Insurance Winspace.

== Major results ==
=== Track ===
2016
1st Scratch, UCI Junior World Track Championships
2018
3rd Scratch, Asian Track Championships
2019
2nd Scratch, Asian Track Championships

=== Road ===
2015
10th Time trial, Asian Junior Road Championships
2018
National Under-23 Road Championships

1st Time trial
2nd Road race

2019
National Under-23 Road Championships

1st Time trial
2nd Road race

5th Time trial, Asian Under-23 Road Championships
5th Overall Tour of Quanzhou Bay
2020
National Road Championships

3rd Time trial
4th Road race

2021
3rd Time trial, National Road Championships
2022
2nd Team time trial, Asian Road Championships
5th Time trial, National Road Championships
2023
1st Overall Tour of Thailand

1st, Stage 1

2nd Overall Chengdu Tianfu Greenway

1st Stage 2
1st Mountains classification

2nd The Tour Oqtosh - Chorvoq - Mountain II
2nd Tour of Bostonliq I
4th Tour of Bostonliq II
8th The Tour Oqtosh - Chorvoq - Mountain I
2025
9th Overall Tour of Bostonliq

1st Stage 1

7th Overall Tour de Kumano
9th Asian Road Championship Road Race
