= PRUride Philippines =

Road bicycle stage race

Race details
- Date: May
- Region: Philippines
- Discipline: Road
- Competition: UCI Asia Tour
- Type: Stage race

History
- First edition: 2019
- Editions: 1 (as of 2019)
- First winner: Marcelo Felipe (PHI)
- Most recent: Marcelo Felipe (PHI)

PRUride Philippines is an annual professional road bicycle racing stage race held in the Philippines since 2019. The race is part of the UCI Asia Tour and was classified by the International Cycling Union (UCI) as a 2.2 category race.

== Past winners ==
Year	Country	Rider	Team
2019	Philippines	Marcelo Felipe	7 Eleven–Cliqq–air21 by Roadbike Philippines
