= Jeroen Meijers =

Dutch bicycle racer

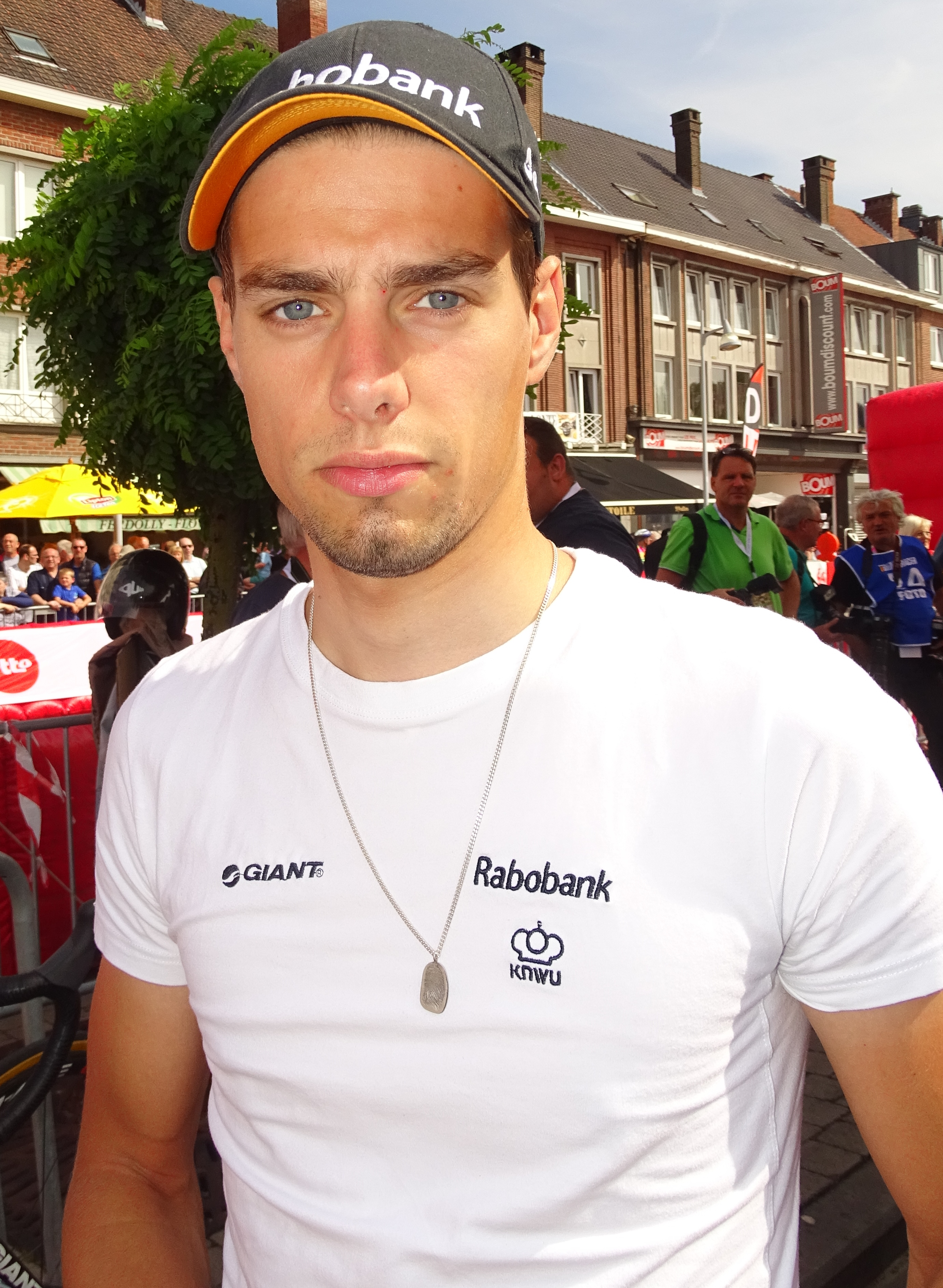
- Meijers in 2015.

Personal information
- Full name: Jeroen Meijers
- Born: 12 January 1993 (age 33) Tilburg, Netherlands
- Height: 1.81 m (5 ft 11 in)
- Weight: 68 kg (150 lb)

Cycling career
- Sport: Cycling
- Current team: Victoria Sports Pro Cycling
- Discipline: Road
- Role: Rider
- Rider type: All-rounder

Amateur teams
- 2011: WV De Jonge Renner
- 2012: Parkhotel Rooding Valkenburg
- 2013: WV De Jonge Renner
- 2013: Rabobank Development Team (stagiaire)
- 2021: Van Uitert–De Jonge Renner

Professional teams
- 2014–2016: Rabobank Development Team
- 2017–2018: Roompot–Nederlandse Loterij
- 2019–2020: Taiyuan Miogee Cycling Team
- 2021–2023: Terengganu Cycling Team
- 2024–: Victoria Sports Pro Cycling Team

Jeroen Meijers (born 12 January 1993 in Tilburg) is a Dutch cyclist, who currently rides for UCI Continental team Victoria Sports Pro Cycling.

== Major results ==
2011
7th Overall Driedaagse van Axel
8th Overall GP Général Patton
2013
3rd Overall Carpathian Couriers Race

1st Young rider classification
1st Stage 2

2014
10th Hadeland GP
10th Ringerike GP
2015
7th Overall Olympia's Tour
7th Piccolo Giro di Lombardia
9th Arnhem–Veenendaal Classic
10th Grand Prix Pino Cerami
2016
1st Overall Kreiz Breizh Elites
1st Flèche Ardennaise
4th Overall Rhône-Alpes Isère Tour
4th Overall Tour de Gironde
5th Overall Tour de Bretagne

1st Points classification
1st Sprints classification

10th Overall Istrian Spring Trophy
2017
6th Volta Limburg Classic
8th Overall Tour des Fjords
2018
6th Overall Tour of Norway
8th Volta Limburg Classic
8th Druivenkoers Overijse
9th Overall Tour des Fjords
9th Grote Prijs Stad Zottegem
10th Antwerp Port Epic
2019
1st Overall Tour de Filipinas

1st Stage 1

1st Overall Tour of China I

1st Stage 4

3rd Overall Tour of Taiyuan
3rd Overall Tour de Indonesia

1st Stage 2

10th Overall Tour de Iskandar Johor
2020
10th Overall Tour de Serbie
10th Overall Tour of Mevlana
10th Grand Prix Central Anatolia
2021
2nd Grand Prix Develi
5th Grand Prix Velo Erciyes
2022
1st Grand Prix Erciyes
3rd Grand Prix Yahyalı
4th Grand Prix Kayseri
9th Grote Leo van Berlo Ronde van Lieshout
2023
1st Overall Tour de Taiwan

1st Stage 4

3rd Overall Tour of Yiğido

1st Points classification

2024
1st Oita Urban Classic
6th Overall Trans-Himalaya Cycling Race
2025
3rd Overall Tour of Huangshan

1st Stage 3

1st Stage 3 Tour of Salalah
10th Overall Tour de Banyuwangi Ijen

1st Points classification
1st Stage 1
