= Roojai Insurance (cycling team) =

Thai cycling team

Team information
- UCI code: R0I
- Registered: Thailand (2020, 2023–); Indonesia (2021–2022)
- Founded: 2020
- Discipline: Road
- Status: Club (2020); UCI Continental (2021–)

Key personnel
- General manager: Peter Pouly
- Team manager: Chaiya Moondet

Team name history
- 2020–2021 2022 2023 2024–: Roojai.com Cycling Team; Roojai Cycling Team; Roojai Online Insurance; Roojai Insurance

Roojai Insurance is a Thai (previously Indonesian) registered UCI Continental cycling team established in 2020. For its first year of existence, the team held amateur status, before upgrading to Continental in 2021. The team's main sponsors are Roojai Insurance and Winspace Bikes.

== Team roster ==
As of 5 July 2024.

Rider	Date of birth
Tegshbayar Batsaikhan (MGL)	1 June 1998 (age 28)
Carter Bettles (AUS)	2 February 1998 (age 28)
Lucas Carstensen (GER)	16 June 1994 (age 32)
Phuridet Inthapiw (THA)	28 May 2003 (age 23)
Peerapong Ladngern (THA)	21 December 1995 (age 30)
Vincent Lau Wan-yau (HKG)	23 September 1996 (age 29)
Valentin Midey (FRA)	25 February 1990 (age 36)
Arttasorn Pansaard (THA)	28 November 2001 (age 24)

Rider	Date of birth
Patompob Phonarjthan (THA)	22 June 1997 (age 29)
Ariya Phounsavath (LAO)	2 March 1991 (age 35)
Kane Richards (AUS)	1 December 1996 (age 29)
Tanawat Saenta (THA)	23 May 2005 (age 21)
Kongphob Thimachai (THA)	1 December 2002 (age 23)
Polychronis Tzortzakis (GRE)	3 January 1989 (age 37)
Adne van Engelen (NED)	16 March 1993 (age 33)
Thanachat Yatan (THA)	1 October 1991 (age 34)

== Major wins ==
2023
Overall Tour of Sharjah, Adne van Engelen

Stage 4, Adne van Engelen
Stage 5, Lucas Carstensen

Stage 5 New Zealand Cycle Classic, Lucas Carstensen
2024
Stage 4 Tour de Taiwan, Carter Bettles

== National champions ==
2023
Thailand Under-23 Road Race, Kongphob Thimachai
Thailand Under-23 Time Trial, Kongphob Thimachai
2024
Hong Kong National Time Trial championships, Vincent Lau Wan Yau
