= Tour of Salalah =

Annual cycling race in Oman

Race details
- Date: September
- Region: Oman
- Discipline: Road
- Competition: UCI Asia Tour (2023–)
- Type: Stage race

History
- First edition: 2021
- Editions: 5 (as of 2025)
- First winner: Jaber Almansoori (UAE)
- Most wins: No repeat winners
- Most recent: Adne van Engelen (NED)

The Tour of Salalah is a multi-day road cycling race annually held in Oman. It has been part of the UCI Asia Tour since 2023 and is contested in September.

== Winners ==
Year	Winner	Second	Third
2021	Jaber Almansoori (UAE)	Bilal Alsaadi (QAT)	Mostafa Alrabie (SAU)
2022	Saif Al Kaabi (UAE)	Jaber Almansoori (UAE)	Abdulla Alhammadi (UAE)
2023	Grega Bole (SLO)	Abdulla Jasim Al-Ali (UAE)	Kenny Nijssen (NED)
2024	Nícolas Sessler (BRA)	Ibrahim Essabahy (MAR)	Azzedine Lagab (ALG)
2025	Adne van Engelen (NED)	Abdulla Jasim Al-Ali (UAE)	Mathias Bregnhøj (DEN)
