= Tour of Luzon =

Filipino multi-day road cycling race

Race details
- Region: Philippines
- Discipline: Road
- Competition: UCI Asia Tour 2.2
- Type: Stage race
- Organiser: Duckworld PH
- Web site: tourofluzoncycling.com

History
- First edition: 1955 (as Tour of Luzon)
- First winner: Antonio Arzala (PHI)
- Most wins: Antonio Arzala (PHI) (3 wins)
- Most recent: Nikita Shulchenko (RUS)

The Tour of Luzon (TOL; also known as MPTC Tour of Luzon for sponsorship reasons) is an annual professional road bicycle racing stage race held in Luzon, Philippines since 1955 as part of the UCI Asia Tour. It is held in April every year. While the course changes every year, the tour traditionally ends at Rizal Park, Manila, although recently the tour has ended in Baguio after being licensed by the UCI. Established as the Tour of Luzon, the stage race was previously known under various names including the Marlboro Tour, Tour of Calabarzon, Tour Pilipinas and Padyak Pinoy, and Le Tour de Filipinas.

The current iteration is organized by Duckworld PH and is sanctioned by the Integrated Cycling Federation of the Philippines (PhilCycling).

== History ==
=== 1955 – 1976: Tour of Luzon ===
In 1955, the Tour was launched as a four-stage race from Manila to Vigan race won by Antonio Arzala. But, a year later, the race was renamed as the Tour of Luzon and carried the name until 1976 (there was no tour held in 1968, 1970–1972).

The prominent riders included two-time Tour champions Cornelio Padilla, Jr. of Central Luzon and Jose Sumalde of Bicol. However, in 1977, a rift within the PCAP (see below) led to a split of two tours during the said year. However, according to the Padyak Pinoy website, the event organized by Geruncio Lacuesta is recognized on their official list. The tour's name ended by 1978 as Marlboro entered the scene.

=== 1979 – 1998: Marlboro Tour ===
By 1979, Philip Morris became the official sponsor of the tour and the event was named as Marlboro Tour after its cigarette brand Marlboro, a name that is commonly familiar to ardent racers and fans. During these times, the tour expanded its routes, by including cities from Visayas in the leg, with the final laps regularly held at the Quirino Grandstand in Manila.

From 1997-1998, the tour allowed riders from Asia to compete in the event and was sanctioned by the UCI. It also led to Wong Kam-po of Hong Kong to become the first non-Filipino to win the event in 1997, after overtaking 1996 winner Victor Espiritu for the lead in the latter stages.

The format used for the teams are based on provinces with the national team included in the race. It was also the same format when Asian riders participated in the event beginning in 1997.

The 1998 tour was known as the Marlboro Centennial Tour and was organized in line with the Philippine Centennial observances.

In 1999, Marlboro backed out as sponsor following a trend of discouraging tobacco sponsorship of sports events. In 2000, a race under the name Millenium Tour was attempted to be held in May but was cancelled due to budgetary concerns and inability to meet the standards set by the Union Cycliste Internationale (UCI).

=== 2002 – 2007: Revival ===
In 2002, the tour was revived after Airfreight 2100 of Bert Lina and Lito Alvarez financed the tour. A four-leg race was held in late-May known as Tour of CALABARZON won by Santy Barnachea. A year later, the tour was renamed as Tour Pilipinas, and held a 17-leg race, the longest since 1998. The tour was won by Arnel Quirimit of Pangasinan.

Ryan Tanguilig won in 2004 in a 10-stage tour. In 2005, the tour was renamed as the Golden Tour 50 @ 05, honoring the 50th anniversary of the Tour. 1998 champion Warren Davadilla, who won the last edition of the Marlboro, was the champion. In 2006, several disputes within the Integrated Cycling Federation of the Philippines led to a short eight stage event dubbed with the Padyak Pinoy name, won by Barnachea.

Lina, as president of PhilCycling cancelled the Padyak Pinoy in 2008, over corruption allegations on the national team.

=== 2009 – 2019: Le Tour de Filipinas ===
The Padyak Pinoy Tour of Champions was held in 2009. This race was later retroactively designated as the first Le Tour de Filipinas (LTdF)

The first race to be actually be called as the Le Tour de Filipinas was the 2010 race. The event was also reincluded in the UCI Asia Tour. It was last included in the UCI calendar 12 years ago when it was still known as the Marlboro Tour. The Le Tour de Filipinas was still backed by Alberto Lina.

The tour was held annually continuously until 2019. The 2020 iteration considered by its organizers as the 11th LTdF was cancelled due to the COVID-19 pandemic.

=== 2025 – present: Return of the Tour of Luzon ===
The tour was returned in 2025 under its old name Tour of Luzon. This was due to the partnership of Duckworld PH with the Metro Pacific Tollways Corporation (MPTC).

The event dubbed as The Great Revival started on April 24 and will end on May 1, 2025. It is an eight-stage race starting from Laoag and ends in Baguio. The organizers aim to have Tour de Luzon reincluded in the UCI calendar.

== Stages ==
=== Marlboro Tour days ===
These were the stages in 1996:

1. Davao City to Carmen, Davao del Norte
2. Tagum, Davao del Norte to Butuan
3. Butuan to Cagayan de Oro
4. Cebu City to Cebu City (individual time trial)
5. Cebu City to Cebu City via Santander
6. Dumaguete to Bacolod
7. Iloilo City to Iloilo City via Pototan, Iloilo (team time trial)
8. Iloilo City to Iloilo City via San Jose de Buenavista, Antique
9. Pasay to Lucena
10. Lucena to Marikina
11. Marikina to Olongapo
12. Olongapo to Alaminos, Pangasinan
13. Alaminos, Pangasinan to San Jose, Nueva Ecija
14. San Jose, Nueva Ecija to Banaue, Ifugao
15. Banaue, Ifugao to Tuguegarao, Cagayan
16. Tuguegarao, Cagayan to Vigan, Ilocos Sur
17. Vigan, Ilocos Sur to Baguio
18. Rosario, La Union to Baguio (individual time trial)
19. Baguio to Baguio

=== Le Tour de Filipinas days ===
These were the stages in 2019:

1. Tagaytay, Cavite to Tagaytay, Cavite via Lemery, Batangas
2. Pagbilao, Quezon to Daet, Camarines Norte
3. Daet, Camarines Norte to Legazpi, Albay
4. Legazpi, Albay to Legazpi, Albay via Sorsogon City
5. Legazpi, Albay to Legazpi, Albay via Donsol, Sorsogon

=== Tour of Luzon days ===
These were stages in the 2025 revival:

1. Paoay, Ilocos Norte to Paoay, Ilocos Norte
2. Paoay, Ilocos Norte to Vigan, Ilocos Sur (individual time trial)
3. Vigan, Ilocos Sur to San Juan, La Union
4. Agoo. La Union to Angeles City
5. Mabalacat, Pampanga to Mabalacat, Pampanga
6. Mabalacat, Pampanga to Lingayen, Pangasinan
7. Lingayen, Pangasinan to Labrador, Pangasinan
8. Lingayen, Pangasinan to Baguio

== Past winners ==
=== Tour of Luzon ===
Year	Date	Stages	Distance	Winner	Time
1955 (Note: Known as the Manila–Vigan Bicycle Race)	28 April–1 May	4	418 km	Antonio Arzala (PHI)	
1956	23–27 May	5	1,057 km	Antonio Arzala (PHI)	33:45:08
1957	28 May–7 June	6	1,155 km	Rufino Gabot (PHI)	51:45:22
1958	14–20 April	7	1,517 km	Mamerto Eden (PHI)	61:14:08
1959	12–19 April	8	1,634 km	Antonio Arzala (PHI)	59:44:50
1960	14–22 May	9	1,648 km	Rodrigo Abaquita (PHI)	57:51:02
1961	25 April–7 May	12	2,167 km	Jose Moring Jr. (PHI)	59:44:50
1962	26 March–8 April	12	1,870.23 km	Edmundo De Guzman (PHI)	61:04:50
1963	21 April–5 May	14	2,334.38 km	Gonzalo Recodos (PHI)	78:27:54
1964	19 April–3 May	14	1,967.60 km	Jose Sumalde (PHI)	60:22:09
1965	25 April–9 May	14	2,049.31 km	Jose Sumalde (PHI)	65:13:19
1966	23 April–8 May	15	1,999.82 km	Cornelio Padilla (PHI)	60:45:31
1967	12–19 April	8	1,634 km	Cornelio Padilla (PHI)	70:34:57
1968	Cancelled				
1969 (Note: Tour ng Filipinas)	18–27 April	10	1,208.40 km	Domingo Quilban (PHI)	37:50:29
1970–1972	Cancelled				
1973	11–20 May	10	1,214 km	Jesus Garcia Jr. (PHI)	34:38:38
1974 (Note: Tour of Luzon–Visayas)	23 April–12 May	18	2,540.95 km	Teodorico Rimarim (PHI)	78:35:19
1975	19 April–4 May	15	2,207.87 km	Samson Etrata (PHI)	66:18:48
1976	21 April–9 May	6	2,200 km	Modesto Bonzo (PHI)	66:31:10

=== Tour of the Philippines ===
Year	Name	Date	Stages	Distance	Winner	Time
1977	Tour ng Pilipinas	2 May–5 June	24	4,000 km	Manuel Reynante (PHI)	106:57:20
1977	Marlboro Tour ng Pilipinas	7–26 June	3	1,697 km	Jesus Garcia Jr. (PHI)	55:37:52
1978	Perk Speed Tour	9–12 February	4	405.8 km	Rumin Salamante (PHI)	10:11:10
1979	Marlboro Tour	18–30 April	11	1,900 km	Paquito Rivas (PHI)	60:01:06
1980	Tour of the Philippines	15 April–11 May	21	2,780.83 km	Manuel Reynante (PHI)	83:08:00
1981	Tour of the Philippines	17 March–12 April	21	3,058.81 km	Jacinto Sicam (PHI)	87:25:43

=== Marlboro Tour ===
Year	Name	Date	Stages	Distance	Winner	Time
1982	Marlboro Tour	22 April–9 May	15	2,192 km	Jacinto Sicam (PHI)	61:29:17
1983	Marlboro Tour	16 April–1 May	14	2,313.11 km	Romeo Bonzo (PHI)	63:54:31
1984	Marlboro Tour	26 May–10 June	14	2,464 km	Ruben Carino (PHI)	68:08:49
1985	Marlboro Tour	18 April–12 May	21	3,668.97 km	Pepito Calip (PHI)	97:04:42
1986	Marlboro Tour	26 April–11 May	10	2,900.77 km	Rolando Pagnanawon (PHI)	77:39:53
1987	Marlboro Tour	21 May–7 June	17	3,282 km	Reynaldo Dequito (PHI)	88:06:50
1988	Marlboro Tour	28 April–15 May	17	3,544.53 km	Armando Catalan (PHI)	94:44:03
1989	Marlboro Tour	26 April–14 May	18	3,539.47 km	Gerardo Igos (PHI)	95:40:23
1990	Marlboro Tour	18 April–6 May	18	3,317.42 km	Manuel Buenaventura (PHI)	95:58:38
1991	Marlboro Tour	25 April–12 May	17	2,373.61 km	Bernardo Llentada (PHI)	63:33:17
1992	Marlboro Tour	21 May–7 June	17	2,731.38 km	Renato Dolosa (PHI)	71:21:49
1993	Marlboro Tour	17 April–9 May	21	3,480 km	Carlo Guieb (PHI)	91:41:54
1994	Marlboro Tour	17 April–9 May	20	3,563 km	Carlo Guieb (PHI)	91:24:13
1995	Marlboro Tour	18 March–8 April	19	3,280.33 km	Renato Dolosa (PHI)	83:43:39
1996	Marlboro Tour	14 April–5 May	19	3,257.29 km	Victor Espiritu (PHI)	80:50:46
1997	Marlboro Tour	16 April–4 May	16	2,472 km	Wong Kam-po (HKG)	62:06:28
1998	Marlboro Centennial Tour	15 April–3 May	16	2,494 km	Warren Davadilla (PHI)	64:58:57
1999	Cancelled					
2000	Millennium Tour	May	Cancelled			

=== FedEx/Air21 Tour / Padyak Pinoy ===
Year	Name	Date	Stages	Distance	Winner	Time
2002	FedEx Tour of CALABARZON	30 May–2 June	4	517.7 km	Santi Barnachea (PHI)	12:41:13
2003	Air21 Tour Pilipinas	16 April–11 May	15	2,849.8 km	Arnel Quirimit (PHI)	55:29:20
2004	Air21 Tour Pilipinas	15 April–2 May	17	2,849.8 km	Rhyan Tanguilig (PHI)	70:28:59
2005	Golden Tour 50@05	26 May–5 June	10	1,492 km	Warren Davadilla (PHI)	37:20:55
2006	Padyak Pinoy Tour Pilipinas	12–18 May	8	1,219.4 km	Santi Barnachea (PHI)	31:10:03
2007	Padyak Pinoy	17–29 May	10	1,500 km	Victor Espiritu (PHI)	33:02:38

=== Le Tour de Pilipinas ===
Year	Name	Date	Stages	Distance	Winner	Time	Ref.
2009	Padyak Pinoy Tour of Champions (Note: Retroactively known as the 1st Le Tour de Filipinas)	8–15 May	8	1,070 km	Joel Calderon (PHI)	29:52:33	
2010	Le Tour de Filipinas	12–20 April	4	468.8 km	David McCann (Note: David McCann is the first European cyclist to win the Tour. Non-Asian riders were allowed to participate in 2010.) (IRL)	11:29:20	
2011	Le Tour de Filipinas	16–19 April	4	468.8 km	Rahim Emami (IRI)	12:15:34	
2012	Le Tour de Filipinas	14–17 April	4	502 km	Baler Ravina (Note: Baler Ravina was the first Filipino overall winner in Le Tour de Filipinas that was sanctioned by UCI.) (PHI)	13:20:26	
2013	Le Tour de Filipinas	13–16 April	4	616 km	Ghader Mizbani (IRI)	16:38:37	
2014	Le Tour de Filipinas	21–24 April	4	614.8 km	Mark Galedo (PHI)	17:12:05	
2015	Le Tour de Filipinas	1–4 February	4	532.5 km	Thomas Lebas (FRA)	13:40:49	
2016	Le Tour de Filipinas	18–21 February	4	691 km	Oleg Zemlyakov (KAZ)	17:36:23	
2017	Le Tour de Filipinas	18–21 February	4	726.55 km	Jai Crawford (AUS)	17:33:07	
2018	Le Tour de Filipinas	20–23 May	4	638.37 km	El Joshua Cariño (PHI)	12:25:23	
2019	Le Tour de Filipinas	14–18 June	5	822.3 km	Jeroen Meijers (NED)	20:38:07	
2020	Le Tour de Filipinas	1–5 May	Cancelled due to the COVID-19 pandemic				

In the 2016 edition, race organizers had to stop the stage 1 event due to unprecedented road repairs, followed by traffic jams in Tiaong, Quezon, the first in the history of Le Tour de Filipinas.

=== Tour of Luzon ===
Year	Name	Date	Stages	Distance	Winner	Time	Ref.
2025	Tour of Luzon: The Great Revival	24 April–1 May	8	1,074.9 km	Dae Yeong Joo (KOR)	22:21:08	
2026	Tour of Luzon	29 April–13 May	14	1,900 km	Nikita Shulchenko (RUS)	41:11:10	

== Jerseys ==
Like other bicycle races, the tour also hands out specific jerseys:

- Yellow: General classification
- Purple: Stage Winner
- Green: Best sprinter
- Red polka dot: Best climber
- White: Young rider
