= 2021 national road cycling championships =

The 2021 national road cycling championships were held throughout the year and were organised by the UCI member federations. They began in Qatar with the men's time trial event on 26 January.

== Jerseys ==
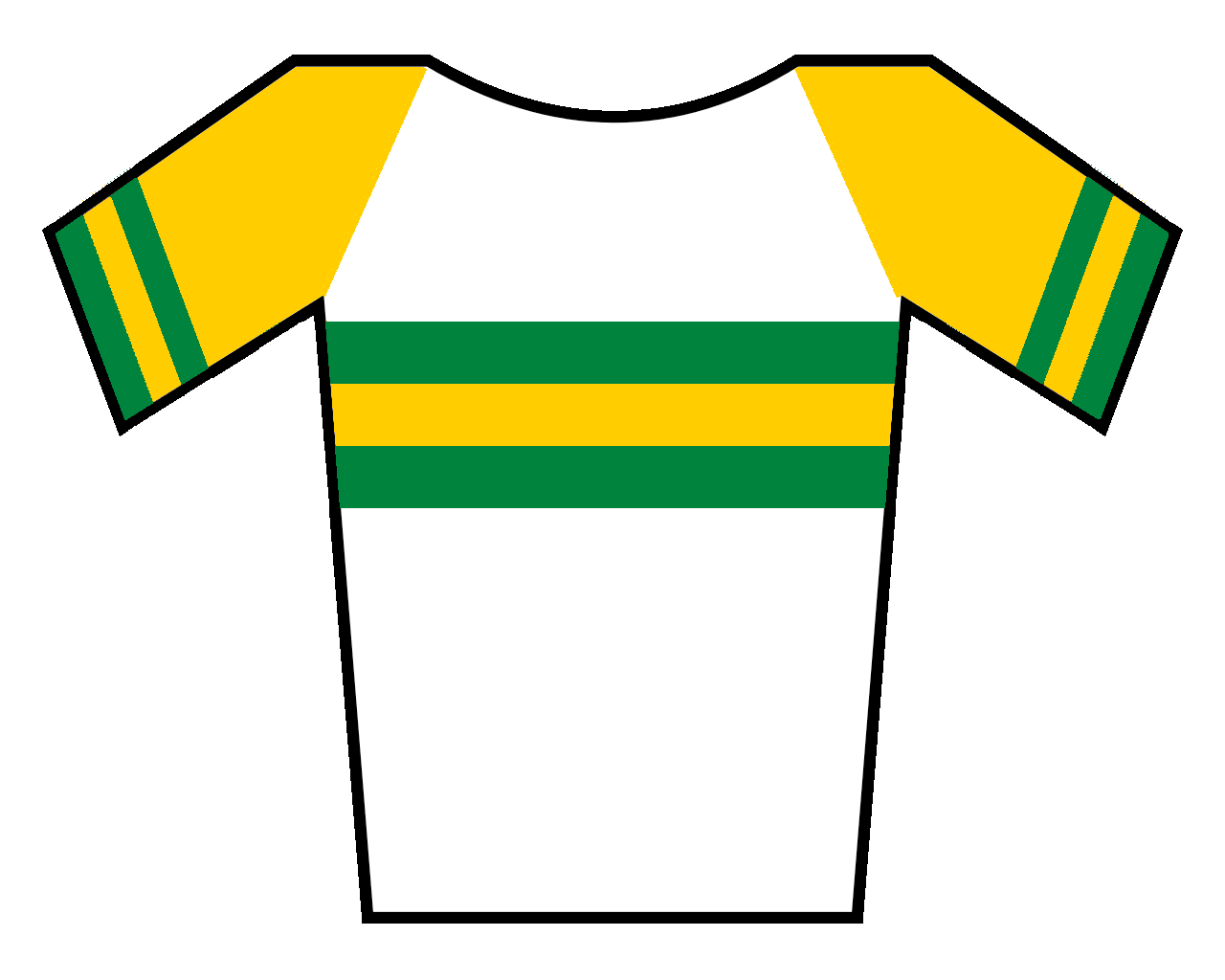
Australian Champion

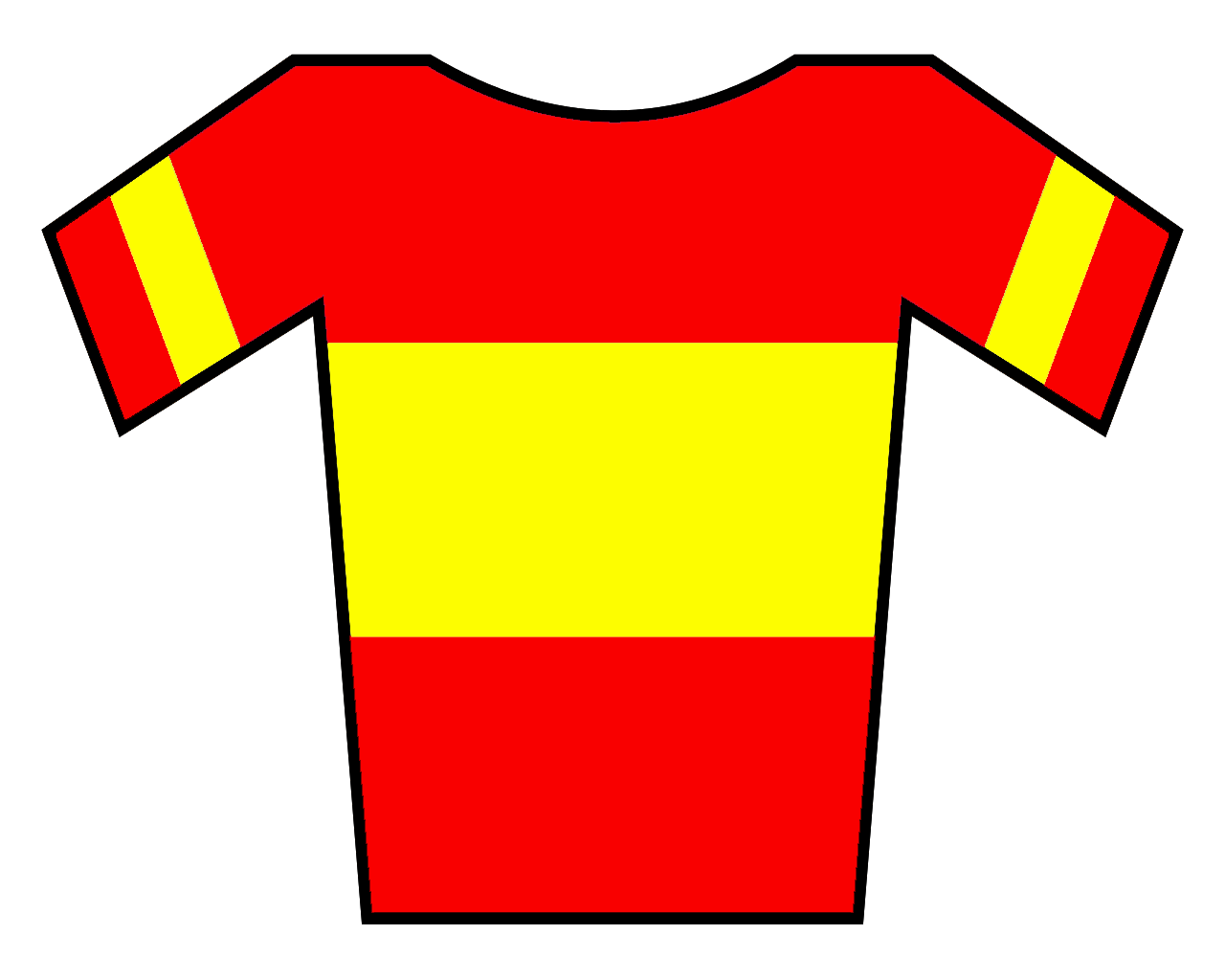
Spanish Champion

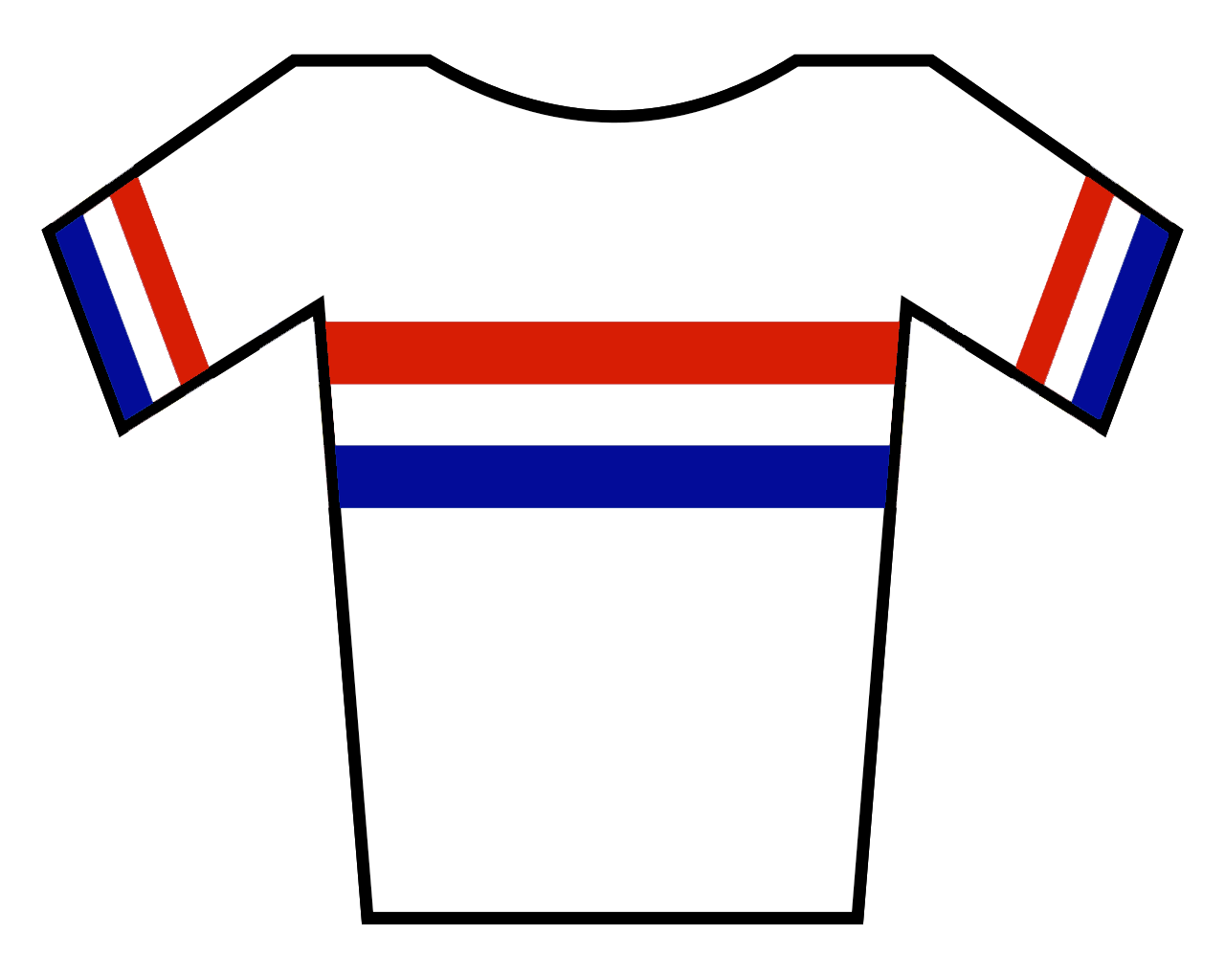
British
Champion

The winner of each national championship wears the national jersey in all their races for the next year in the respective discipline, apart from the World Championships and the Olympics, or unless they are wearing a classification leader's jersey in a stage race. Most national champion jerseys tend to represent a country's flag or use the colours from it, like the Spanish and British jerseys, respectively. Jerseys may also feature traditional sporting colours of a country that are not derived from a national flag, such as the green and gold jerseys of Australian national champions.

== 2021 champions ==
=== Men's Elite ===
Country	Men's Elite Road Race Champion	Road Race Champion's Team	Men's Elite Time Trial Champion	Time Trial Champion's Team
Albania	Ylber Sefa	Tarteletto–Isorex	Ylber Sefa	Tarteletto–Isorex
Algeria	Azzedine Lagab	FAC	Azzedine Lagab	FAC
Anguilla	Zambezi Richardson		Zambezi Richardson	
Antigua and Barbuda	Emmanuel Gayral	Team Terminix	Robert Marsh	East Side Raiders
Argentina	Pablo Alfredo Brun	Ciclismo Al Toque Olavarria	Juan Pablo Dotti	Sindicato de Empleados Publicos de San Juan
Aruba			Hillard Cijntje	Tri-Bike Cycling Team
Australia	Cameron Meyer	Team BikeExchange	Luke Plapp	Team Inform TM Insight Make
Austria	Patrick Konrad	Bora–Hansgrohe	Matthias Brändle	Israel Start-Up Nation
Azerbaijan	Musa Mikayilzade	Sərhədçi	Musa Mikayilzade	Sərhədçi
Bahamas	Lorin Sawyer		Lorin Sawyer	
Barbados	Philip Clarke	Sentry Insurance	Jacob Kelly	Sentry Insurance
Belarus	Stanislau Bazhkou	Minsk Cycling Club	Yauheni Karaliok	Minsk Cycling Club
Belgium	Wout van Aert	Team Jumbo–Visma	Yves Lampaert	Deceuninck–Quick-Step
Belize	Justin Williams	L39ION of Los Angeles	Oscar Quiroz	501 Valvoline Cycling Team
Bermuda	Dominique Mayho	V.T. Construction	Kaden Hopkins	Equipo Essax
Bolivia	William Rodríguez Cuellar	Cochabamba	Freddy Gonzáles	Cochabamba
Bosnia and Herzegovina	Vedad Karic	BK Rotacija-SPIN Zenica	Vedad Karic	BK Rotacija-SPIN Zenica
Brazil	Kléber Ramos	Memorial – Santos/Fupes	Lauro Chaman	Memorial – Santos/Fupes
Bulgaria	Spas Gyurov	Team Snooze-VSD	Petar Dimitrov	Nessebar
Burkina Faso	Paul Daumont	AS Bessel		
Canada	Guillaume Boivin	Israel Start-Up Nation	Hugo Houle	Astana–Premier Tech
Cape Verde	Nélio Cruz			
Chile	José Luis Rodríguez Aguilar	Start Cycling Team	José Luis Rodríguez Aguilar	Start Cycling Team
Colombia	Aristóbulo Cala	Sundark	Walter Vargas	Team Medellín–EPM
Costa Rica	Jason Huertas	Colono Construcción – Bike Station – Clips	Jason Huertas	Colono Construcción – Bike Station – Clips
Croatia	Viktor Potočki	Ljubljana Gusto Santic	Toni Stojanov	
Cyprus	Andreas Miltiadis	Gios	Andreas Miltiadis	Gios
Czech Republic	Michael Kukrle	Elkov–Kasper	Josef Černý	Deceuninck–Quick-Step
Denmark	Mads Würtz Schmidt	Israel Start-Up Nation	Kasper Asgreen	Deceuninck–Quick-Step
Ecuador	Jefferson Alexander Cepeda	Androni Giocattoli–Sidermec	Jorge Luis Montenegro	Movistar Team Ecuador
Eritrea	Dawit Yemane	Asbieco	Merhawi Kudus	Astana–Premier Tech
El Salvador	Carlos Alvergue		Raúl Monroy	
Estonia	Mihkel Räim	HRE Mazowsze Serce Polski	Rein Taaramäe	Intermarché–Wanty–Gobert Matériaux
Eswatini	Muzi Shabangu	MTN Khemani		
Ethiopia	Hailemelekot Hailu		Hailemelekot Hailu	
Fiji	Jone Takape		Steve Nutley	RT 23
Finland	Joonas Henttala	Team Novo Nordisk	Matti Hietajärvi	OTC
France	Rémi Cavagna	Deceuninck–Quick-Step	Benjamin Thomas	Groupama–FDJ
Georgia	Nika Sitchinava		Nika Sitchinava	
Germany	Maximilian Schachmann	Bora–Hansgrohe	Tony Martin	Team Jumbo–Visma
Greece	Georgios Boutopoulos	ASK Alpha	Polychronis Tzortzakis	Kuwait Pro Cycling Team
Grenada	Tevin Hueton		Tessimy Viechweg	
Guatemala	Alex Julajuj	Ópticas Deluxe	Manuel Rodas	Decorabaños
Guyana	Romello Crawford	Jamison–Cannondale	Raynauth Jeffrey	CRCA/Foundation
Honduras	Luis López	Ópticas Deluxe	Fredd Matute	
Hungary	Viktor Filutás	Giotti Victoria–Savini Due	Erik Fetter	Eolo–Kometa
Iceland	Ingvar Ómarsson	Breiðablik	Rúnar Örn Ágústsson	Tindi
India	Sahil Kumar	SSCB	Naveen John	Karnataka
Indonesia	Muhammad Abdurrohman	KFC Cycling Team	Odie Purnomo Setiawan	KFC Cycling Team
Iran	Saeid Safarzadeh	Omidnia Mashhad Team	Behnam Ariyan	
Ireland	Ryan Mullen	Trek–Segafredo	Ryan Mullen	Trek–Segafredo
Israel	Vladislav Logionov	Club 500 Watt	Omer Goldstein	Israel Start-Up Nation
Italy	Sonny Colbrelli	Team Bahrain Victorious	Matteo Sobrero	Astana–Premier Tech
Japan	Keigo Kusaba	Aisan Racing Team	Nariyuki Masuda	Utsunomiya Blitzen
Kazakhstan	Yevgeniy Fedorov	Astana–Premier Tech	Daniil Fominykh	
Kosovo	Alban Delija	KC Gjakova	Alban Delija	KC Gjakova
Latvia	Toms Skujiņš	Trek–Segafredo	Toms Skujiņš	Trek–Segafredo
Lebanon	Jihad Alahmad	Al-Ghazal AlRiyadi	Karim Chehade	Aley Cycling Club
Lesotho	Teboho Khantsi			
Lithuania	Ignatas Konovalovas	Groupama–FDJ	Evaldas Šiškevičius	Delko
Luxembourg	Kevin Geniets	Groupama–FDJ	Kevin Geniets	Groupama–FDJ
Malaysia	Mohamad Saari Amri Abd Rasim	Team Sapura Cycling	Nur Aiman Rosli	Team Sapura Cycling
Mauritius	Alexandre Mayer	BRSC-CSI Energy	Christopher Rougier-Lagane	Faucon Flacq SC-KFC
Mexico	Eder Frayre	L39ION of Los Angeles	Ignacio Prado	Canel's–Zerouno
Moldova	Andrei Sobennicov	UVT-Devron West Cycling Team	Cristian Raileanu	Team Sapura Cycling
Mongolia	Bolor-Erdene Enkhtaivan		Maral-Erdene Batmunkh	Team OGGI
Montenegro	Slobodan Milonjić	BK Džada	Goran Cerović	BK Pljevlja
Namibia	Drikus Coetzee	Hollard Insure	Drikus Coetzee	Hollard Insure
Netherlands	Timo Roosen	Team Jumbo–Visma	Tom Dumoulin	Team Jumbo–Visma
New Zealand	George Bennett	Team Jumbo–Visma	Aaron Gate	Black Spoke Pro Cycling
Nicaragua			Larry Valle	EDA Contractor
North Macedonia	Predrag Dimevski		Andrej Petrovski	
Norway	Tobias Foss	Team Jumbo–Visma	Tobias Foss	Team Jumbo–Visma
Oman	Said Al-Rahbi	Al-Bashir Club	Faisal Al-Maamari	Oman Club
Panama	Franklin Archibold	Panamá es Cultura y Valores	Christofer Jurado	Panamá es Cultura y Valores
Paraguay	Daniel Riveros	Team Ioio	Daniel Riveros	Team Ioio
Peru	Robinson Ruiz	Romero 33	Robinson Ruiz	Romero 33
Poland	Maciej Paterski	Voster ATS Team	Maciej Bodnar	Bora–Hansgrohe
Portugal	José Fernandes	W52 / FC Porto	João Almeida	Deceuninck–Quick-Step
Puerto Rico	Abner González	Movistar Team	Abner González	Movistar Team
Qatar	Afif Abdullah	Team Doha Cycling	Fadhel Al Khater	Rasen Adventure Shop
Romania	Serghei Țvetcov	Wildlife Generation Pro Cycling	Serghei Țvetcov	Wildlife Generation Pro Cycling
Russia	Artem Nych	Gazprom–RusVelo	Aleksandr Vlasov	Astana–Premier Tech
Rwanda	Postponed			
Saint Vincent and the Grenadines			Cammie Adams	
Saudi Arabia	Mostafa Al-Rabie	Al-Salam Club	Mohammad Al-Jaber	Al-Ettifaq Club
Serbia	Dušan Rajović	Delko	Ognjen Ilić	CCN Metalac Sunbelt
Singapore			Yeo Boon Kiak	CyclingTraining.CC
Sint Maarten	Mark Maidwell	Mo-Trouble	Reni Arrondell	ASM
Slovakia	Peter Sagan	Bora–Hansgrohe	Ronald Kuba	Brigetio KSE
Slovenia	Matej Mohorič	Team Bahrain Victorious	Jan Tratnik	Team Bahrain Victorious
South Africa	Marc Pritzen	Team Qhubeka	Ryan Gibbons	UAE Team Emirates
South Korea	Jang Kyung-gu		Choi Sangjin	Geumsan Insam Cello
Spain	Omar Fraile	Astana–Premier Tech	Ion Izagirre	Astana–Premier Tech
Sweden	Victor Hillerström Rundh	CK Hymer	Hugo Forsell	Motala AIF CK
Switzerland	Silvan Dillier	Alpecin–Fenix	Stefan Küng	Groupama–FDJ
Taiwan	Feng Chun-kai	Team Bahrain Victorious	Sergio Tu	Columbus Cycling Team
Thailand	Sarawut Sirironnachai	Thailand Continental Cycling Team	Peerapol Chawchiangkwang	Thailand Continental Cycling Team
Turkey	Onur Balkan	Salcano–Sakarya BB Team	Ahmet Örken	Team Sapura Cycling
Ukraine	Andrii Ponomar	Androni Giocattoli–Sidermec	Mykhaylo Kononenko	Salcano–Sakarya BB Team
United Arab Emirates	Yousif Mirza	UAE Team Emirates	Yousif Mirza	UAE Team Emirates
United Kingdom	Ben Swift	INEOS Grenadiers	Ethan Hayter	INEOS Grenadiers
United States	Joey Rosskopf	Rally Cycling	Lawson Craddock	EF Education–Nippo
Uruguay	Roderick Asconeguy	Club Ciclista Fenix		
Uzbekistan	Danil Evdokimov	Respublikanskaya shkola vysshego sportivnogo masterstva N.G. Dinamo	Muradjan Khalmuratov	Sweet Nice Continental Cycling Team
Venezuela	Luis Gómez		Jeison Rujano	Team Osorio

==== Champions in UCI Men's teams ====
UCI WorldTeams
Team	Road Race Champions	Time Trial Champions
AG2R Citroën Team		
Astana–Premier Tech	Yevgeniy Fedorov (KAZ); Omar Fraile (ESP)	Hugo Houle (CAN); Merhawi Kudus (ERI); Matteo Sobrero (ITA); Aleksandr Vlasov (RUS); Ion Izagirre (ESP)
Bora–Hansgrohe	Patrick Konrad (AUT); Maximilian Schachmann (GER); Peter Sagan (SVK)	Maciej Bodnar (POL)
Cofidis		
Deceuninck–Quick-Step	Rémi Cavagna (FRA)	Yves Lampaert (BEL); Josef Černý (CZE); Kasper Asgreen (DEN); João Almeida (POR)
EF Education–Nippo		Lawson Craddock (USA)
Groupama–FDJ	Ignatas Konovalovas (LTU); Kevin Geniets (LUX)	Benjamin Thomas (FRA); Kevin Geniets (LUX); Stefan Küng (SUI)
INEOS Grenadiers	Ben Swift (GBR)	Ethan Hayter (GBR)
Intermarché–Wanty–Gobert Matériaux		Rein Taaramäe (EST)
Israel Start-Up Nation	Guillaume Boivin (CAN); Mads Würtz Schmidt (DEN)	Matthias Brändle (AUT); Omer Goldstein (ISR)
Lotto–Soudal		
Movistar Team	Abner González (PUR)	Abner González (PUR)
Team Bahrain Victorious	Sonny Colbrelli (ITA); Matej Mohorič (SLO); Feng Chun-kai (TPE)	Jan Tratnik (SLO)
Team BikeExchange	Cameron Meyer (AUS)	
Team DSM		
Team Jumbo–Visma	Wout van Aert (BEL); Timo Roosen (NED); George Bennett (NZL); Tobias Foss (NOR)	Tony Martin (GER); Tom Dumoulin (NED); Tobias Foss (NOR)
Team Qhubeka NextHash		
Trek–Segafredo	Ryan Mullen (IRL); Toms Skujiņš (LAT)	Ryan Mullen (IRL); Toms Skujiņš (LAT)
UAE Team Emirates	Yousif Mirza (UAE)	Ryan Gibbons (RSA); Yousif Mirza (UAE)

UCI ProTeams
Team	Road Race Champions	Time Trial Champions
Alpecin–Fenix	Silvan Dillier (SUI)	
Androni Giocattoli–Sidermec	Jefferson Alexander Cepeda (ECU); Andrii Ponomar (UKR)	
Arkéa–Samsic		
B&B Hotels p/b KTM		
Bardiani–CSF–Faizanè		
Bingoal Pauwels Sauces WB		
Burgos BH		
Caja Rural–Seguros RGA		
Delko	Dušan Rajović (SRB)	Evaldas Šiškevičius (LTU)
Eolo–Kometa		Erik Fetter (HUN)
Equipo Kern Pharma		
Euskaltel–Euskadi		
Gazprom–RusVelo	Artem Nych (RUS)	
Rally Cycling	Joey Rosskopf (USA)	
Sport Vlaanderen–Baloise		
Team Novo Nordisk	Joonas Henttala (FIN)	
Team TotalEnergies		
Uno-X Pro Cycling Team		
Vini Zabù		

=== Women's Elite ===
Country	Women's Elite Road Race Champion	Road Race Champion's Team	Women's Elite Time Trial Champion	Time Trial Champion's Team
Algeria	Yasmine El Meddah	NRD Ibrahim	Yasmine El Meddah	NRD Ibrahim
Antigua and Barbuda	Vanessa Kelsick		Lindsay Duffy	Road Runners Cycling Club
Argentina	María Mercedes Fadiga		Fiorella Malaspina	D'Amico Cycling
Australia	Sarah Roy	Team BikeExchange	Sarah Gigante	Tibco–Silicon Valley Bank
Austria	Kathrin Schweinberger	Doltcini–Van Eyck–Proximus	Anna Kiesenhofer	Team Cookina Graz
Azerbaijan	Ayan Khankishiyeva	WCC Team	Ayan Khankishiyeva	WCC Team
Bahamas	Antioniece Simmons		Mary Gibbs	
Barbados	Amber Joseph	L39ION of Los Angeles	Amber Joseph	L39ION of Los Angeles
Belarus	Tatsiana Sharakova	Minsk Cycling Club	Tatsiana Sharakova	Minsk Cycling Club
Belgium	Lotte Kopecky	Liv Racing	Lotte Kopecky	Liv Racing
Belize	Alicia Thompson	Belize Bank Swoosh	Nicole Gallego	M&M Engineering Cycling Team
Bermuda	Caitlin Conyers	Winners Edge	Nicole Mitchell	
Bolivia	Rebeca Sarabia	Cochabamba	Rebeca Sarabia	Cochabamba
Bosnia and Herzegovina	Martina Čondra	Tempo-Vitez	Martina Čondra	Tempo-Vitez
Brazil	Ana Paula Polegatch	UniFunvic/Semelp/Gelog	Ana Paula Polegatch	UniFunvic/Semelp/Gelog
Bulgaria	Petya Minkova	Nessebar	Iveta Kostadinova	Velorapter
Burkina Faso	Awa Bamogo	USFA		
Canada	Alison Jackson	Liv Racing	Alison Jackson	Liv Racing
Chile	Aranza Villalón	Club Augusto Silva Ibaceta	Aranza Villalón	Club Augusto Silva Ibaceta
Colombia	Lorena Colmenares	Colombia Tierra de Atletas–GW Bicicletas	Sérika Gulumá	Colnago CM Team
Costa Rica	Cristel Espinoza	CBZ Asfaltos	Milagro Mena	Colono Construcción – Bike Station – Clips
Croatia	Maja Perinović	Team Rupelcleaning–Champion Lubricants	Mia Radotić	
Cyprus	Antri Christoforou	Burgos Alimenta Women Cycling Sport	Antri Christoforou	Burgos Alimenta Women Cycling Sport
Czech Republic	Tereza Neumanová	Burgos Alimenta Women Cycling Sport	Nikola Nosková	SD Worx
Denmark	Amalie Dideriksen	Trek–Segafredo	Emma Norsgaard Jørgensen	Movistar Team
Ecuador	Miryam Núñez	Movistar Team Ecuador	Miryam Núñez	Movistar Team Ecuador
El Salvador	Iris Díaz		Karen Umaña	
Eritrea	Bisrat Gebremeskel		Adyam Tesfalem	
Estonia	Aidi Gerde Tuisk	Eneicat–RBH Global–Martín Villa	Mari-Liis Mõttus	Haanja Rattaklubi
Eswatini	Dinize Wilsch	4EVA Cycling Club		
Ethiopia	Trhas Tesfay		Trhas Tesfay	
Finland	Antonia Gröndahl	Team Rupelcleaning–Champion Lubricants	Tiina Pohjalainen	Triathlon Suomen
France	Évita Muzic	FDJ Nouvelle-Aquitaine Futuroscope	Audrey Cordon-Ragot	Trek–Segafredo
Germany	Lisa Brennauer	Ceratizit–WNT Pro Cycling	Lisa Brennauer	Ceratizit–WNT Pro Cycling
Greece	Varvara Fasoi	Porto Leone Cycling Academy	Eleni Tsavari	Rodilios Cycling Club
Grenada	Lucy Murchie		Lucy Murchie	
Guatemala			Jasmin Soto	Team Femenino Macizo Cordelsa
Guyana			Suzanne Hamilton	Linden Bauxite Flyers Cycling Club
Honduras	Linda Daniela Menéndez	Threshold Expert	Linda Daniela Menéndez	Threshold Expert
Hungary	Blanka Kata Vas	Doltcini–Van Eyck–Proximus	Blanka Kata Vas	Doltcini–Van Eyck–Proximus
Iceland	Silja Jóhannesdóttir	HFA	Ágústa Björnsdóttir	Tindi
India	Sonali Chanu	RSPB	Pranita Soman	Maharashtra
Indonesia	Crismonita Dwi Putri		Arfiana Khairunnisa	
Iran	Somayeh Yazdani	VIB Sports	Mandana Dehghan	
Ireland	Imogen Cotter	Keukens Redant	Joanna Patterson	The Independent Pedaler
Israel	Omer Shapira	Canyon//SRAM	Rotem Gafinovitz	Bingoal Casino–Chevalmeire
Italy	Elisa Longo Borghini	Trek–Segafredo	Elisa Longo Borghini	Trek–Segafredo
Japan	Miki Uetake	Y's Road	Shoko Kashiki	Team Illuminate
Kazakhstan	Makhabbat Umutzhanova	Dubai Police Cycling Team	Rinata Sultanova	A.R. Monex
Kosovo	Dafina Zylfiu	KC Dardana		
Latvia	Lina Svarinska	Servetto–Makhymo–Beltrami TSA	Dana Rožlapa	Keukens Redant Cycling Team
Lithuania	Inga Češulienė	Aromitalia–Basso Bikes–Vaiano	Inga Češulienė	Aromitalia–Basso Bikes–Vaiano
Luxembourg	Christine Majerus	SD Worx	Christine Majerus	SD Worx
Malaysia	Nur Aisyah Mohamad Zubir	Terengganu A	Siti Nur Adibah Akma Mohd Fuad	Johor A
Mauritius	Raphaëlle Lamusse	MRSC-ENL	Raphaëlle Lamusse	MRSC-ENL
Mexico	Lizbeth Salazar	A.R. Monex	Adriana Barraza Castañeda	Trimss Zacatecas
Moldova	Tatiana Cotiga		Tatiana Cotiga	
Mongolia	Solongo Tserenlkham		Anujin Jinjiibadam	
Montenegro	Žana Pavićević	BK Pljevlja	Žana Pavićević	BK Pljevlja
Namibia	Vera Looser	RE/MAX	Vera Looser	RE/MAX
Netherlands	Amy Pieters	SD Worx	Anna van der Breggen	SD Worx
New Zealand	Georgia Williams	Team BikeExchange	Georgia Williams	Team BikeExchange
Nicaragua			Maria José Silva	Bike Fun Run
Norway	Vita Heine	Massi–Tactic	Katrine Aalerud	Movistar Team
Panama	Wendy Ducreux		Cristina Mata	
Paraguay	Silvia Rodas	Paraguay Cycles Club	Silvia Rodas	Paraguay Cycles Club
Peru	Mariana Rojas	Moxie	Mariana Rojas	Moxie
Poland	Karolina Karasiewicz	TKK Pacific Toruń Nestlé Fitness	Karolina Karasiewicz	TKK Pacific Toruń Nestlé Fitness
Portugal	Maria Martins	Drops–Le Col	Daniela Campos	Bizkaia–Durango
Puerto Rico	Donelys Cariño	STS Cycling Team	Donelys Cariño	STS Cycling Team
Romania	Georgeta Ungureanu	CS UVT Devron West Cycling Team	Manuela Mureșan	CD Seven Pro Cycling
Russia	Seda Krylova	Sestroretsk	Tamara Dronova	Cogeas–Mettler–Look
Rwanda	Postponed			
Saudi Arabia	Ahlam Al-Zaid			
Serbia	Jelena Erić	Movistar Team	Sara Počuča	BTC City Ljubljana
Singapore			Luo Yiwei	
Sint Maarten	Susan Piscione	Tri-Sport Tigers	Nicole Erato	
Slovakia	Tereza Medveďová	WCC Team	Nora Jenčušová	Bepink
Slovenia	Eugenia Bujak	Alé BTC Ljubljana	Eugenia Bujak	Alé BTC Ljubljana
South Africa	Hayley Preen		Candice Lill	Summit
South Korea	Lee Eun-hee		Shin Ji-eun	Geumsan Insam Cello
Spain	Mavi García	Alé BTC Ljubljana	Mavi García	Alé BTC Ljubljana
Sweden	Carin Winell	CK Hymer	Nathalie Eklund	GT Krush Tunap
Switzerland			Marlen Reusser	Alé BTC Ljubljana
Thailand	Supaksorn Nuntana	Office of the Permanent Secretary of Defense	Phetdarin Somrat	Office of the Permanent Secretary of Defense
Turkey	Azize Bekar		Ezgi Bayram	
United Kingdom	Pfeiffer Georgi	Team DSM	Anna Henderson	Team Jumbo–Visma
Ukraine			Valeriya Kononenko	Colnago CM Team
Uruguay	Agustina Fernández	Club Ciclista Ciudad del Plata de San José		
United States	Lauren Stephens	Tibco–Silicon Valley Bank	Chloé Dygert	Canyon//SRAM
Uzbekistan	Yanina Kuskova	Respublikanskaya shkola vysshego sportivnogo masterstva N.G. Dinamo	Yanina Kuskova	Respublikanskaya shkola vysshego sportivnogo masterstva N.G. Dinamo
Venezuela	Wilmarys Moreno		Wilmarys Moreno	

==== Champions in UCI Women's teams ====
UCI Women's WorldTeams
Team	Road Race Champions	Time Trial Champions
Alé BTC Ljubljana	Eugenia Bujak (SLO); Mavi García (ESP)	Eugenia Bujak (SLO); Mavi García (ESP); Marlen Reusser (SUI)
Canyon//SRAM	Omer Shapira (ISR)	Chloé Dygert (USA)
FDJ Nouvelle-Aquitaine Futuroscope	Évita Muzic (FRA)	
Liv Racing	Lotte Kopecky (BEL); Alison Jackson (CAN)	Lotte Kopecky (BEL); Alison Jackson (CAN)
Movistar Team	Jelena Erić (SRB)	Emma Norsgaard Jørgensen (DEN); Katrine Aalerud (NOR)
SD Worx	Christine Majerus (LUX); Amy Pieters (NED)	Nikola Nosková (CZE); Christine Majerus (LUX); Anna van der Breggen (NED)
Team BikeExchange	Sarah Roy (AUS); Georgia Williams (NZL)	Georgia Williams (NZL)
Team DSM	Pfeiffer Georgi (GBR)	
Trek–Segafredo	Amalie Dideriksen (DEN); Elisa Longo Borghini (ITA)	Audrey Cordon-Ragot (FRA); Elisa Longo Borghini (ITA)

UCI Women's Continental Teams
Team	Road Race Champions	Time Trial Champions
A.R. Monex	Lizbeth Salazar (MEX)	Rinata Sultanova (KAZ)
Andy Schleck–CP NVST–Immo Losch		
Arkéa Pro Cycling Team		
Aromitalia–Basso Bikes–Vaiano	Inga Češulienė (LTU)	Inga Češulienė (LTU)
AWOL O'Shea		
Bepink		Nora Jenčušová (SVK)
Bingoal Casino–Chevalmeire		Rotem Gafinovitz (ISR)
Bizkaia–Durango		Daniela Campos (POR)
Born to Win G20 Ambedo		
Burgos Alimenta Women Cycling Sport	Antri Christoforou (CYP); Tereza Neumanová (CZE)	Antri Christoforou (CYP)
CAMS–Basso Bikes		
Ceratizit–WNT Pro Cycling	Lisa Brennauer (GER)	Lisa Brennauer (GER)
China Liv Pro Cycling		
Cogeas–Mettler–Look		Tamara Dronova (RUS)
DNA Pro Cycling		
Doltcini–Van Eyck–Proximus	Kathrin Schweinberger (AUT); Kata Blanka Vas (HUN)	Kata Blanka Vas (HUN)
Drops–Le Col	Maria Martins (POR)	
Eneicat–RBH Global–Martín Villa	Aidi Gerde Tuisk (EST)	
Ferei–CCN		
GT Krush Tunap		Nathalie Eklund (SWE)
InstaFund Racing		
Isolmant–Premac–Vittoria		
Laboral Kutxa–Fundación Euskadi		
Lotto–Soudal Ladies		
Lviv Cycling Team		
Macogep Tornatech Girondins de Bordeaux		
Massi–Tactic	Vita Heine (NOR)	
Minsk Cycling Club	Tatsiana Sharakova (BLR)	Tatsiana Sharakova (BLR)
Multum Accountants Ladies		
NXTG Racing		
Parkhotel Valkenburg		
Plantur–Pura		
Rally Cycling		
Río Miera–Cantabria Deporte		
Roxsolt Liv SRAM		
Servetto–Makhymo–Beltrami TSA	Lina Svarinska (LAT)	
Sestroretsk	Seda Krylova (RUS)	
Sopela Women's Team		
Stade Rochelais Charente-Maritime		
Team Coop–Hitec Products		
Team Farto–BTC		
Team Illuminate		Shoko Kashiki (JPN)
Team Jumbo–Visma		Anna Henderson (GBR)
Team Rupelcleaning–Champion Lubricants	Maja Perinović (CRO); Antonia Gröndahl (FIN)	
Tibco–Silicon Valley Bank	Lauren Stephens (USA)	Sarah Gigante (AUS)
Top Girls Fassa Bortolo		
Valcar–Travel & Service		
WCC Team	Ayan Khankishiyeva (AZE); Tereza Medveďová (SVK)	Ayan Khankishiyeva (AZE)
