= 2022 national road cycling championships =

The 2022 national road cycling championships are being held throughout the year and are organised by the UCI member federations. They began in Australia with the men's and women's time trial events on 12 January.

== Jerseys ==
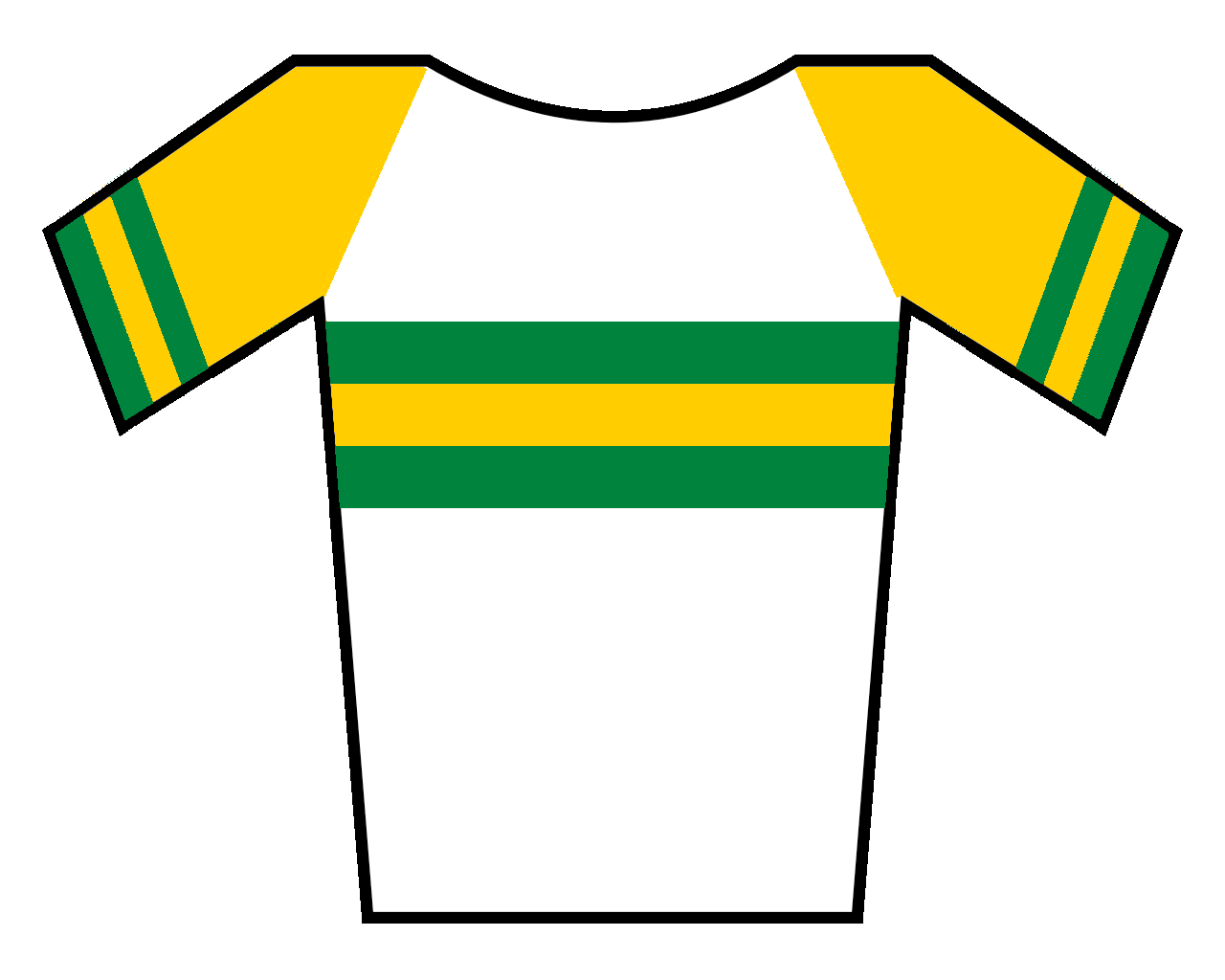
Australian Champion

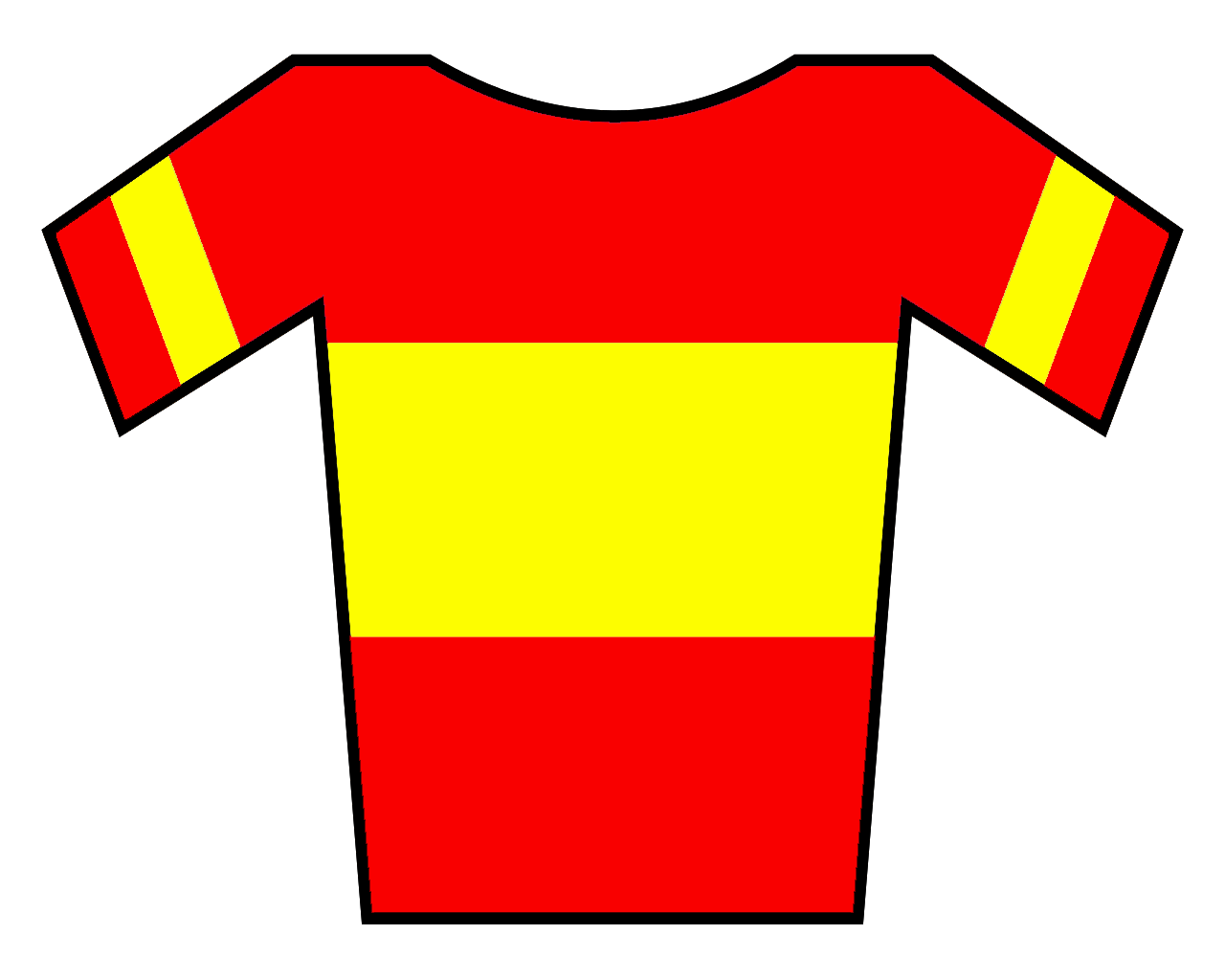
Spanish Champion

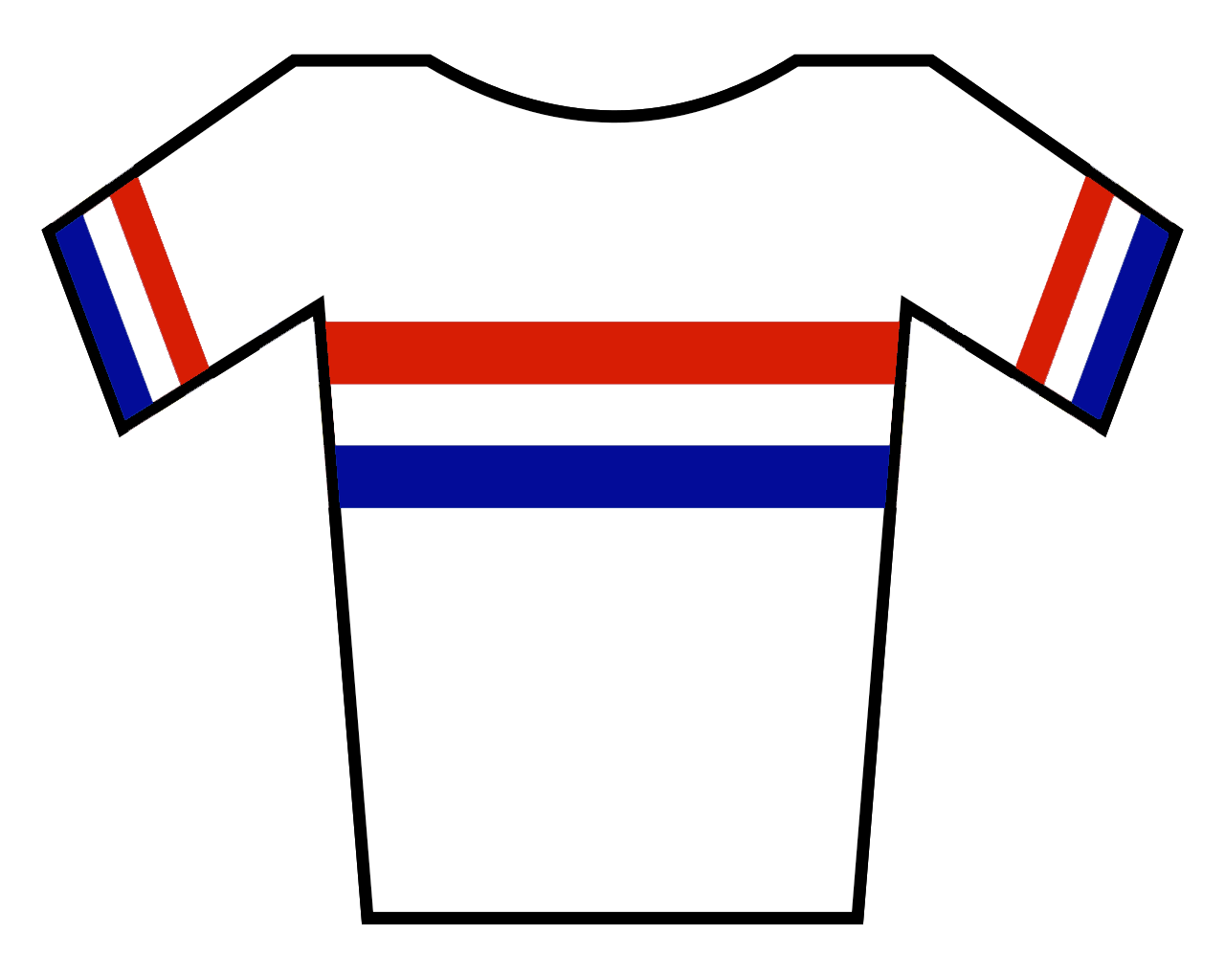
British
Champion

The winner of each national championship wears the national jersey in all their races for the next year in the respective discipline, apart from the World Championships and the Olympics, or unless they are wearing a classification leader's jersey in a stage race. Most national champion jerseys tend to represent a country's flag or use the colours from it, like the Spanish and British jerseys, respectively. Jerseys may also feature traditional sporting colours of a country that are not derived from a national flag, such as the green and gold jerseys of Australian national champions.

== 2022 champions ==
=== Men's Elite ===
Country	Men's Elite Road Race Champion	Road Race Champion's Team	Men's Elite Time Trial Champion	Time Trial Champion's Team
Albania	Ylber Sefa		Ylber Sefa	
Algeria	Islam Mansouri	MCA	Azzedine Lagab	MCA
Angola	Bruno Araújo	BAI–Sicasal–Petro de Luanda	Dário António	
Anguilla	Sherwin Osborne			
Antigua and Barbuda	Jyme Bridges		Emmanuel Gayral	Team Terminix
Argentina	Emiliano Contreras	Chimbas Te Quiero	Alejandro Durán	Chimbas Te Quiero
Aruba				
Australia	Luke Plapp	INEOS Grenadiers	Rohan Dennis	Team Jumbo–Visma
Austria	Felix Großschartner	Bora–Hansgrohe	Felix Großschartner	Bora–Hansgrohe
Azerbaijan	Elchin Asadov	Sakarya BB Pro Team	Elchin Asadov	Sakarya BB Pro Team
Bahamas	Patrick Paul			
Bahrain	Ahmed Madan	Team Bahrain Victorious		
Barbados	Grégory Vanderpool		Jacob Kelly	Sentry/Glassesco
Belarus	Aliaksandr Piasetski	Minsk Cycling Club	Yauheni Karaliok	Minsk Cycling Club
Belgium	Tim Merlier	Alpecin–Fenix	Remco Evenepoel	Quick-Step Alpha Vinyl Team
Belize	Giovanni Lovell	G-Flow Cycling Team	Óscar Quiroz	501 Valvoline
Benin	Ricardo Sodjèdé	SAS	Ricardo Sodjèdé	SAS
Bermuda			Conor White	
Bolivia	David Rojas	Tarija	Freddy Gonzales	Pío Rico Cycling Team
Bosnia and Herzegovina	Husein Selimović	BK Tuzla	Vedad Karic	Meridiana–Kamen
Botswana	Matlhogonolo Botlhole	Team Swift Cycling Club		
Brazil	Vinícius Rangel	Movistar Team	Lauro Chaman	Memorial Santos–SaddleDrunk
British Virgin Islands	Darel Christopher	Nice Métropole Côte d'Azur	Philippe Leroy	
Bulgaria	Martin Papanov	Nessebar	Nikolay Genov	Tzar Simeon-MBN
Burkina Faso	Moucaïla Rawende	AS Bessel		
Cambodia				
Canada	Pier-André Côté	Human Powered Health	Derek Gee	Israel Cycling Academy
Cape Verde				
Cayman Islands	Kevin Connolly		Kevin Connolly	
Chile	Francisco Kotsakis	Papa John's Cycling Team	José Luis Rodríguez Aguilar	
China	Li Jun Bai	Li-Ning Star		
Chinese Taipei				
Colombia	Sergio Higuita	Bora–Hansgrohe	Daniel Martínez	INEOS Grenadiers
Costa Rica	Jason Huertas	Colono Construcción–Bike Station	José Alexis Rodríguez	Schneider-Colono Agropecuario
Croatia	Carlo Jurišević	Ljubljana Gusto Santic	Fran Miholjević	Cycling Team Friuli ASD
Cuba	Yan Luis Arrieta		Pedro Portuondo	
Cyprus	Andreas Miltiadis	Java Kiwi Atlántico	Andreas Miltiadis	Java Kiwi Atlántico
Czech Republic	Matěj Zahálka	Elkov–Kasper	Jan Bárta	Elkov–Kasper
Denmark	Alexander Kamp	Trek–Segafredo	Mathias Norsgaard	Movistar Team
Dominican Republic	Darnell Lantigua	INTEJA-IMCA-CAT		
Ecuador	Richard Huera	Team Banco Guayaquil–Ecuador	Richard Carapaz	INEOS Grenadiers
Eritrea	Merhawi Kudus	EF Education–EasyPost	Biniam Girmay	Intermarché–Wanty–Gobert Matériaux
El Salvador	Bryan Mendoza		Raúl Monroy	
Estonia	Mihkel Räim	Burgos BH	Rein Taaramäe	Intermarché–Wanty–Gobert Matériaux
Eswatini	Shabangu Muzi			
Ethiopia	Kiya Rogora		Kiya Rogora	
Fiji	Théo Dumanchin		Ilaitia Nainoce	
Finland	Anders Bäckman	IBD Cycling	Markus Knaapi	Team Ampler-Tartu2024
France	Florian Sénéchal	Quick-Step Alpha Vinyl Team	Bruno Armirail	Groupama–FDJ
Georgia	Giorgi Khorguani		Giorgi Khorguani	
Germany	Nils Politt	Bora–Hansgrohe	Lennard Kämna	Bora–Hansgrohe
Ghana	Anthony Boakye	River Pack Cycling Club		
Greece	Georgios Bouglas	Spor Toto Cycling Team	Periklis Ilias	
Grenada	Red Walters		Red Walters	
Guam	Blayde Blas	EuroCyclingTrips–CCN		
Guatemala	Mardoqueo Vásquez		Manuel Rodas	
Guyana				
Honduras	Cristian Triminio	Bikemart Racing Team	Cristian Triminio	Bikemart Racing Team
Hong Kong	Lau Wan Yau		Lau Wan Yau	
Hungary	Attila Valter	Groupama–FDJ	Erik Fetter	Eolo–Kometa
Iceland	Ingvar Ómarsson	Breiðablik	Ingvar Ómarsson	Breiðablik
India				
Indonesia	Aiman Cahyadi	MULA	Muhammad Abdurrahman	MULA
Iran	Behnam Khalili	Azad University Team	Hossein Askari	
Ireland	Rory Townsend	WiV SunGod	Ben Healy	EF Education–EasyPost
Israel	Itamar Einhorn	Israel–Premier Tech	Omer Goldstein	Israel–Premier Tech
Italy	Filippo Zana	Bardiani–CSF–Faizanè	Filippo Ganna	INEOS Grenadiers
Ivory Coast	Souleymane Traoré			
Japan	Yukiya Arashiro	Team Bahrain Victorious	Sohei Kaneko	
Jamaica	Barrington Bailey		Phillip McCatty	
Jordan	Majed Abu Harra			
Kazakhstan	Yevgeniy Gidich	Astana Qazaqstan Team	Yuriy Natarov	Astana Qazaqstan Team
Kosovo	Alban Delija	KÇ Gjakova 137	Alban Delija	KÇ Gjakova 137
Latvia	Emīls Liepiņš	Trek–Segafredo	Toms Skujiņš	Trek–Segafredo
Lebanon	Gilbert Hannouche			
Lesotho	Kabelo Makatile			
Lithuania	Venantas Lašinis	Kaunas cycling team	Aivaras Mikutis	Team Ampler-Tartu2024
Luxembourg	Colin Heiderscheid	Leopard Pro Cycling	Bob Jungels	AG2R Citroën Team
Malaysia	Muhsin Al Redha Misbah	Team Sapura Cycling	Nur Aiman Rosli	Team Sapura Cycling
Mali				
Malta	Clive Ebejer	Team Greens CC	Etienne Bonello	Team Greens CC
Mauritius	Alexandre Mayer	Black River SC-CSI Energy	Christopher Lagane	KFC-Faucon Flacq Cycling Team
Mexico	Efrén Santos	Canel's–Java	Ignacio Sarabia	Mani Zabala–Jagafa
Moldova	Andrei Sobennicov	UVT-Devron West Cycling Team	Arman Garibian	UVT-Devron West Cycling Team
Mongolia	Maral-Erdene Batmunkh	Terengganu Polygon Cycling Team	Jambaljamts Sainbayar	Terengganu Polygon Cycling Team
Montenegro	Slobodan Milonjić	BK Džada	Slobodan Milonjić	BK Džada
Morocco	Achraf Ed Doghmy		Mohcine El Kouraji	Sidi Ali-Kinetik Sports Pro Cycling Team
Namibia	Drikus Coetzee	Hollard Insure	Jean-Paul Burger	
Nepal	Hikmat B.K.		Suraj Rana Magar	
Netherlands	Pascal Eenkhoorn	Team Jumbo–Visma	Bauke Mollema	Trek–Segafredo
New Zealand	James Fouché	Bolton Equities Black Spoke Pro Cycling	Regan Gough	Bolton Equities Black Spoke Pro Cycling
Nicaragua	Argenis dela Concepcion Vanegas Calero	Team Kilos	Argenis dela Concepcion Vanegas Calero	Team Kilos
North Macedonia	Andrej Petrovski	Team Möbel Ehrmann	Andrej Petrovski	Team Möbel Ehrmann
Norway	Rasmus Tiller	Uno-X Pro Cycling Team	Tobias Foss	Team Jumbo–Visma
Oman	Faisal Al-Mammari		Faisal Al-Mammari	
Panama	Bolívar Espinosa	Panamá es Cultura y Valores	Franklin Archibold	Panamá es Cultura y Valores
Paraguay	José González	Team Ioio Paraguay	Francisco Riveros	Ioio Cycling Team
Peru	Royner Navarro	Club AVV Perú	Royner Navarro	Club AVV Perú
Philippines	Jonel Carcueva	Go for Gold Philippines	Mark Galedo	7 Eleven–Cliqq–air21 by Roadbike Philippines
Poland	Norbert Banaszek	HRE Mazowsze Serce Polski	Maciej Bodnar	Team TotalEnergies
Portugal	João Almeida	UAE Team Emirates	Rafael Reis	Glassdrive–Q8–Anicolor
Puerto Rico	Abner González	Movistar Team	Elvys Reyes	Club Emanuel
Qatar	Abdullah Aljaaidi		Fadhel Alkhater	
Romania	Emil Dima	Giotti Victoria–Savini Due	Daniel Crista	Giotti Victoria–Savini Due
Russia	Petr Rikunov	Gazprom–RusVelo	Alexander Evtushenko	
Rwanda	Eric Manizabayo	Benediction Ignite	Didier Munyaneza	ProTouch
Saint Vincent and the Grenadines	Cammie Adams		Cammie Adams	
Saudi Arabia				
Serbia	Dušan Rajović	Team Corratec	Dušan Rajović	Team Corratec
Singapore	Yeo Boon Kiak		Goh Choon Huat	Terengganu Polygon Cycling Team
Sint Maarten				
Slovakia	Peter Sagan	Team TotalEnergies	Ján Andrej Cully	Dukla Banská Bystrica
Slovenia	Kristijan Koren	Adria Mobil	Jan Tratnik	Team Bahrain Victorious
South Africa	Reinardt Janse van Rensburg	Lotto–Soudal (Note: Janse van Rensburg won when he was still without a team; he subsequently joined Lotto–Soudal on 1 May.)	Byron Munton	Cycling Friends Cape Town
South Korea	Kyung Gu Jang		Min Kyeong-ho	Seoul Cycling Team
Spain	Carlos Rodríguez	INEOS Grenadiers	Raúl García	Equipo Kern Pharma
Suriname	Riandy Xavi Wadilie		Kenrick Sahadeo	
Sweden	Lucas Eriksson	Riwal Cycling Team	Jacob Ahlsson	Motala AIF Serneke Allebike
Switzerland	Robin Froidevaux	Tudor Pro Cycling Team	Joel Suter	UAE Team Emirates
Taiwan	Liu En-chieh		Sergio Tu	Cycling Team Friuli ASD
Thailand	Janluang Jetsada	Thailand Continental Cycling Team	Peerapol Chawchiangkwang	Thailand Continental Cycling Team
Togo	Abdou Raouf Akanga			
Tunisia	Nadhem Ben Amor	ASMT	Oussama Kbaier	ASMT
Trinidad and Tobago	Tariq Woods	Evolution Cycling Academy	Jason Costelloe	
Turkey	Mustafa Sayar	Sakarya BB Pro Team	Ahmet Örken	Wildlife Generation Pro Cycling
Ukraine				
United Arab Emirates	Yousif Mirza	UAE Team Emirates	Yousif Mirza	UAE Team Emirates
United Kingdom	Mark Cavendish	Quick-Step Alpha Vinyl Team	Ethan Hayter	INEOS Grenadiers
United States	Kyle Murphy	Human Powered Health	Lawson Craddock	Team BikeExchange–Jayco
United States Virgin Islands				
Uruguay	Guillermo Thomas Silva	Previley–Coforma	Agustín Alonso Torres	Club Ciclista Ciudad Del Plata
Uzbekistan	Akramjon Sunnatov	Tashkent City Professional Cycling Team	Aleksey Fomovskiy	Tashkent City Professional Cycling Team
Venezuela	Orluis Aular	Caja Rural-Seguros RGA	Orluis Aular	Caja Rural-Seguros RGA
Zambia	Yanjanani Sakala			

==== Champions in UCI Men's teams ====
UCI WorldTeams
Team	Road Race Champions	Time Trial Champions
AG2R Citroën Team		Bob Jungels (LUX)
Astana Qazaqstan Team	Yevgeniy Gidich (KAZ)	Yuriy Natarov (KAZ)
Bora–Hansgrohe	Felix Großschartner (AUT); Sergio Higuita (COL); Nils Politt (GER)	Felix Großschartner (AUT); Lennard Kämna (GER)
Cofidis		
EF Education–EasyPost	Merhawi Kudus (ERI)	Ben Healy (IRL)
Groupama–FDJ	Attila Valter (HUN)	Bruno Armirail (FRA)
INEOS Grenadiers	Luke Plapp (AUS); Carlos Rodríguez (ESP)	Daniel Martínez (COL); Richard Carapaz (ECU); Ethan Hayter (GBR); Filippo Ganna (ITA)
Intermarché–Wanty–Gobert Matériaux		Biniam Girmay (ERI); Rein Taaramäe (EST)
Israel–Premier Tech	Itamar Einhorn (ISR)	Omer Goldstein (ISR)
Lotto–Soudal	Reinardt Janse van Rensburg (RSA)	
Movistar Team	Vinícius Rangel (BRA); Abner González (PUR)	Mathias Norsgaard (DEN)
Quick-Step Alpha Vinyl Team	Florian Sénéchal (FRA); Mark Cavendish (GBR)	Remco Evenepoel (BEL)
Team Bahrain Victorious	Ahmed Madan (BHR); Yukiya Arashiro (JPN)	Jan Tratnik (SVN)
Team BikeExchange–Jayco		Lawson Craddock (USA)
Team DSM		
Team Jumbo–Visma	Pascal Eenkhoorn (NED)	Rohan Dennis (AUS); Tobias Foss (NOR)
Trek–Segafredo	Alexander Kamp (DEN); Emīls Liepiņš (LVA)	Toms Skujiņš (LVA); Bauke Mollema (NED)
UAE Team Emirates	João Almeida (POR); Yousif Mirza (UAE)	Joel Suter (SUI); Yousif Mirza (UAE)

UCI ProTeams
Team	Road Race Champions	Time Trial Champions
Alpecin–Fenix	Tim Merlier (BEL)	
Arkéa–Samsic		
B&B Hotels–KTM		
Bardiani–CSF–Faizanè	Filippo Zana (ITA)	
Bingoal Pauwels Sauces WB		
Burgos BH	Mihkel Räim (EST)	
Caja Rural–Seguros RGA	Orluis Aular (VEN)	Orluis Aular (VEN)
Drone Hopper–Androni Giocattoli		
Eolo–Kometa		Erik Fetter (HUN)
Equipo Kern Pharma		Raúl García (ESP)
Euskaltel–Euskadi		
Human Powered Health	Kyle Murphy (USA); Pier-André Côté (CAN)	
Sport Vlaanderen–Baloise		
Team Novo Nordisk		
Team TotalEnergies	Peter Sagan (SVK)	Maciej Bodnar (POL)
Uno-X Pro Cycling Team	Rasmus Tiller (NOR)	

=== Women's Elite ===
Country	Women's Elite Road Race Champion	Road Race Champion's Team	Women's Elite Time Trial Champion	Time Trial Champion's Team
Afghanistan	Fariba Hashimi	Valcar–Travel & Service	Fariba Hashimi	Valcar–Travel & Service
Algeria	Nesrine Houili	ASNO	Nesrine Houili	ASNO
Antigua and Barbuda				
Argentina	Maribel Aguirre	Zaaf Cycling Team	Antonella Leonardi	
Australia	Nicole Frain	Roxsolt Liv SRAM	Grace Brown	FDJ United–Suez
Austria	Christina Schweinberger	Plantur–Pura	Christina Schweinberger	Plantur–Pura
Azerbaijan	Viktoriya Sidorenko		Viktoriya Sidorenko	
Bahamas	Sanchia Fitzmaurice			
Barbados	Danielle Hinds	Bike Caribbean	Amber Joseph	L39ION of Los Angeles
Belarus	Hanna Tserakh	Minsk Cycling Club	Hanna Tserakh	Minsk Cycling Club
Belgium	Kim de Baat	Plantur–Pura	Lotte Kopecky	SD Worx
Belize	Kaya Cattouse	LA Sweat	Alicia Thompson	Belize Bank Swoosh
Benin	Chantal Vidognonlonhoue		Chantal Vidognonlonhoue	
Bermuda			Caitlin Conyers	
Bolivia	Elizabeth Vásquez	Tarija	Rebeca Sarabia	Cochabamba
Bosnia and Herzegovina			Martina Čondra	Rotacija Spin Zenica
Botswana				
Brazil	Aline Cavaglieri	ATP Assessoria Esportiva	Ana Paula Polegatch	UniFunvic–Pindamonhangaba
British Virgin Islands				
Bulgaria	Petya Minkova	Nessebar	Petya Minkova	Nessebar
Burkina Faso	Lamoussa Zoungrana			
Canada	Maggie Coles-Lyster	DNA Pro Cycling	Paula Findlay	
Chile	Catalina Soto	Bizkaia–Durango	Catalina Soto	Bizkaia–Durango
Colombia	Diana Peñuela	DNA Pro Cycling	Lina Hernández	Colombia Tierra de Atletas–GW Shimano
Costa Rica	Krissia Araya	Puro MTB/Bianchi/Saris	Estefanie Álvarez	ATL-BC-Infisport
Croatia	Matea Deliu	Team Jadan Vive le Velo	Mia Radotić	BK Puls
Cuba	Aylena Quevedo		Daymelín Pérez	
Cyprus	Antri Christoforou	Human Powered Health	Antri Christoforou	Human Powered Health
Czech Republic	Tereza Neumanová	Liv Racing Xstra	Denisa Slámová	Cyklotrenink
Denmark	Cecilie Uttrup Ludwig	FDJ Suez Futuroscope	Emma Norsgaard	Movistar Team
Dominican Republic				
Ecuador	Esther Galarza	Biciparts EC	Paula Jara	Team Banco Guayaquil–Ecuador
El Salvador	Sauking Shi		Sauking Shi	
Eritrea	Monalisa Araya		Danait Fitsum	
Estonia	Ann-Christine Allik		Hanna Taaramäe	
Eswatini	Nontsikelelo Mdlovu			
Ethiopia				
Fiji				
Finland	Anniina Ahtosalo	Uno-X Pro Cycling Team	Anniina Ahtosalo	Uno-X Pro Cycling Team
France	Audrey Cordon-Ragot	Trek–Segafredo	Audrey Cordon-Ragot	Trek–Segafredo
Germany	Liane Lippert	Team DSM	Lisa Brennauer	Ceratizit–WNT Pro Cycling
Greece	Varvara Fasoi	Eneicat–RBH Global–Martín Villa	Argiro Milaki	Atlas Cycling Team
Grenada				
Guam	Tara Tydingco		Tara Tydingco	
Guatemala	Jasmin Soto		Jasmin Soto	
Guyana				
Honduras	Linda Menéndez		Linda Menéndez	
Hong Kong	Lam Kong		Lam Kong	
Hungary	Kata Blanka Vas	SD Worx	Kata Blanka Vas	SD Worx
Iceland	Hafdís Sigurðardóttir	HFA	Hafdís Sigurðardóttir	HFA
India			Liontin Evangelina Setiawan	SCID Racing Team
Indonesia				
Iran	Somayeh Yazdani	Suunto Daryakav Vib Bike	Mandana Dehghan	Suunto Daryakav Vib Bike
Ireland	Alice Sharpe	IBCT	Kelly Murphy	
Israel	Omer Shapira	EF Education–Tibco–SVB	Omer Shapira	EF Education–Tibco–SVB
Italy	Elisa Balsamo	Trek–Segafredo	Elisa Longo Borghini	Trek–Segafredo
Ivory Coast	Minata Soro			
Jamaica		Janneille Morgan		
Japan	Shoko Kashiki	Team Illuminate	Shoko Kashiki	Team Illuminate
Kazakhstan	Rinata Sultanova		Makhabbat Umutzhanova	
Kosovo	Dafina Zylfiu	KÇ Dardana	Nita Latifi	KÇ Gjakova 137
Latvia	Anastasia Carbonari	Valcar–Travel & Service	Dana Rožlapa	Keukens Redant Cycling Team
Lithuania	Rasa Leleivytė	Aromitalia–Basso Bikes–Vaiano	Inga Češulienė	Aromitalia–Basso Bikes–Vaiano
Luxembourg	Christine Majerus	SD Worx	Christine Majerus	SD Worx
Malaysia			Siti Nur Adibah Akma Mohd Fuad	
Malta	Juleanne Vassallo	Team Greens CC	Marie Claire Aquilina	Team Greens CC
Mauritius	Aurelie Halbwachs	Moka Rangers Sports Club	Aurelie Halbwachs	Moka Rangers Sports Club
Mexico				
Moldova	Anna Rodina		Anna Rodina	
Mongolia			Solongo Tserenlkham	
Montenegro				
Morocco	Nora Sahmoud	Association Roue d'Or de Mohammedia	Nora Sahmoud	Association Roue d'Or de Mohammedia
Namibia	Vera Looser		Vera Looser	
Nepal	Usha Khanal		Usha Khanal	
Netherlands	Riejanne Markus	Team Jumbo–Visma	Ellen van Dijk	Trek–Segafredo
New Zealand	Olivia Ray	Human Powered Health	Georgia Williams	Team BikeExchange–Jayco
Nicaragua	Maria José Silva	Bike Fun Run	Maria Elisa Gómez	Team Kilos
North Macedonia			Dunja Ivanova	
Norway	Malin Eriksen	CK Victoria	Ane Iversen	Team Coop–Hitec Products
Panama	Wendy Ducreux	Team Ultrabikex	Cristina Michelle Mata	Caminos de Omar
Paraguay	Araceli Galeano Centurión	Emboscada Cycling Club	Araceli Galeano Centurión	Emboscada Cycling Club
Peru	Cynthia Dávila	Ciclismo Extremo Peruano	Mariana Rojas	FDPC
Philippines	Jermyn Prado		Jermyn Prado	
Poland	Wiktoria Pikulik	ATOM Deweloper Posciellux.pl Wrocław	Agnieszka Skalniak-Sójka	ATOM Deweloper Posciellux.pl Wrocław
Portugal	Daniela Campos	Bizkaia–Durango	Daniela Campos	Bizkaia–Durango
Puerto Rico			Donelys Cariño	STS Cycling
Qatar	Sheikha al-Suwaidi			
Romania	Manuela Mureșan	Seven Pro Sport Club	Manuela Mureșan	Seven Pro Sport Club
Russia	Tamara Dronova	Roland Cogeas Edelweiss Squad	Tamara Dronova	Roland Cogeas Edelweiss Squad
Rwanda	Diane Ingabire		Diane Ingabire	
Saint Vincent and the Grenadines	Amber Glasgow		Amber Glasgow	
Saudi Arabia				
Serbia	Jelena Erić	Movistar Team	Aleksandra Sovilj	Biciklistički klub Hajduk Kula
Singapore			Luo Yiwei	
Sint Maarten				
Slovakia	Nora Jenčušová	Bepink	Nora Jenčušová	Bepink
Slovenia	Eugenia Bujak	UAE Team ADQ	Urška Žigart	Team BikeExchange–Jayco
South Africa	Frances Janse van Rensburg	Stade Rochelais Charente-Maritime	Carla Oberholzer	
South Korea			Lee Yeon Kyeong	
Spain	Mavi García	UAE Team ADQ	Mavi García	UAE Team ADQ
Sweden	Jenny Rissveds	Team 31	Nathalie Eklund	Massi–Tactic
Switzerland	Caroline Baur	Roland Cogeas Edelweiss Squad	Elena Hartmann	
Thailand	Jutatip Maneephan		Phetdarin Somrat	Thailand Women's Cycling Team
Taiwan	Huang Ting-ying		Huang Ting-ying	
Togo	Abra Nomessi	2Empower-Kpalimé Cycling Project		
Trinidad and Tobago	Teniel Campbell	Team BikeExchange–Jayco	Teniel Campbell	Team BikeExchange–Jayco
Tunisia	Syrine Fattoum		Syrine Fattoum	
Turkey	Azize Bekar		Azize Bekar	
Ukraine				
United Arab Emirates	Safia Al Sayegh	UAE Team ADQ	Safia Al Sayegh	UAE Team ADQ
United Kingdom	Alice Towers	Le Col–Wahoo	Joss Lowden	Uno-X Pro Cycling Team
Uruguay	Ana Claudia Seijas		Fabiana Granizal	Club Ciclista Ciudad Del Plata
United States	Emma Langley	EF Education–Tibco–SVB	Leah Thomas	Trek–Segafredo
Uzbekistan	Shahnoza Abdullaeva		Margarita Misyurina	Tashkent City Professional Cycling Team
Venezuela	Andisabel Luque de Briceño	Gobierno Bolivariano de Trujillo	Lilibeth Chacón	Team Multimarcas-Sport Táchira
Zambia	Margret Ngoma			

==== Champions in UCI Women's teams ====
UCI Women's WorldTeams
Team	Road Race Champions	Time Trial Champions
Canyon//SRAM		
EF Education–Tibco–SVB	Omer Shapira (ISR); Emma Langley (USA)	Omer Shapira (ISR)
FDJ United–Suez	Cecilie Uttrup Ludwig (DEN)	Grace Brown (AUS)
Human Powered Health	Antri Christoforou (CYP); Olivia Ray (NZL)	Antri Christoforou (CYP)
Liv Racing Xstra	Tereza Neumanová (CZE)	
Movistar Team	Jelena Erić (SRB)	Emma Norsgaard (DEN)
Roland Cogeas Edelweiss Squad	Tamara Dronova (RUS); Caroline Baur (SUI)	Tamara Dronova (RUS)
SD Worx	Kata Blanka Vas (HUN); Christine Majerus (LUX)	Lotte Kopecky (BEL); Kata Blanka Vas (HUN); Christine Majerus (LUX)
Team BikeExchange–Jayco	Teniel Campbell (TTO)	Georgia Williams (NZL); Urška Žigart (SVN); Teniel Campbell (TTO)
Team DSM	Liane Lippert (GER)	
Team Jumbo–Visma	Riejanne Markus (NED)	
Trek–Segafredo	Audrey Cordon-Ragot (FRA); Elisa Balsamo (ITA)	Audrey Cordon-Ragot (FRA); Elisa Longo Borghini (ITA); Ellen van Dijk (NED); Leah Thomas (USA)
UAE Team ADQ	Safia Al Sayegh (UAE); Eugenia Bujak (SVN); Mavi García (ESP)	Safia Al Sayegh (UAE); Mavi García (ESP)
Uno-X Pro Cycling Team	Anniina Ahtosalo (FIN)	Anniina Ahtosalo (FIN); Joss Lowden (GBR)

UCI Women's Continental Teams
Team	Road Race Champions	Time Trial Champions
Andy Schleck–CP NVST–Immo Losch		
Aromitalia–Basso Bikes–Vaiano	Rasa Leleivytė (LTU)	Inga Češulienė (LTU)
AWOL O'Shea		
Bepink	Nora Jenčušová (SVK)	Nora Jenčušová (SVK)
Bingoal Casino–Chevalmeire–Van Eyck Sport		
Bizkaia–Durango	Catalina Soto (CHI); Daniela Campos (POR)	Catalina Soto (CHI); Daniela Campos (POR)
Born to Win G20 Ambedo		
CAMS–Basso		
Ceratizit–WNT Pro Cycling		Lisa Brennauer (GER)
China Liv Pro Cycling		
Cofidis		
DNA Pro Cycling	Maggie Coles-Lyster (CAN); Diana Peñuela (COL)	
Emotional.fr–Tornatech–GSC Blagnac		
Eneicat–RBH Global–Martín Villa	Varvara Fasoi (GRE)	
GT Krush Tunap		
InstaFund Racing		
Isolmant–Premac–Vittoria		
Laboral Kutxa–Fundación Euskadi		
Le Col–Wahoo	Alice Towers (GBR)	
Lotto–Soudal Ladies		
Massi–Tactic		Nathalie Eklund (SWE)
Minsk Cycling Club	Hanna Tserakh (BLR)	Hanna Tserakh (BLR)
Multum Accountants Ladies		
AG Insurance–NXTG		
Parkhotel Valkenburg		
Plantur–Pura	Christina Schweinberger (AUT); Kim de Baat (BEL)	Christina Schweinberger (AUT)
Río Miera–Cantabria Deporte		
Roxsolt Liv SRAM	Nicole Frain (AUS)	
Servetto–Makhymo–Beltrami TSA		
Soltec Team		
Sopela Women's Team		
Stade Rochelais Charente-Maritime	Frances Janse van Rensburg (RSA)	
St. Michel–Auber93		
Team Coop–Hitec Products	Pernille Feldmann (NOR)	Ane Iversen (NOR)
Team Farto–BTC		
Thailand Women's Cycling Team		Phetdarin Somrat (THA)
Top Girls Fassa Bortolo		
Valcar–Travel & Service	Fariba Hashimi (AFG); Anastasia Carbonari (LVA)	Fariba Hashimi (AFG)
WCC Team		
