= 2020 national road cycling championships =

The 2020 national road cycling championships were held throughout the year of 2020, organised by the UCI member federations. They began in Australia with the time trial event (both men and women) on 8 January.

== Jerseys ==
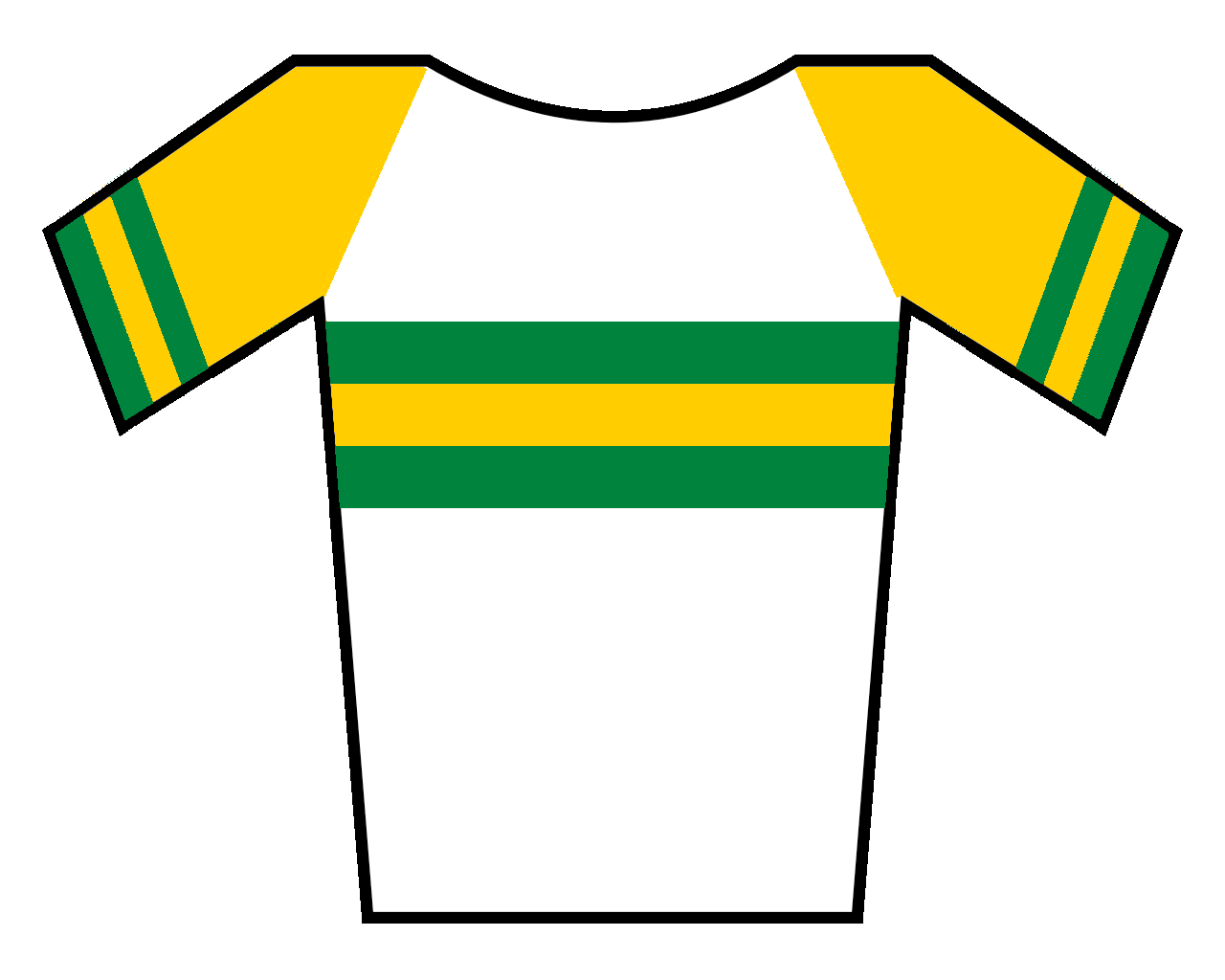
Australian Champion

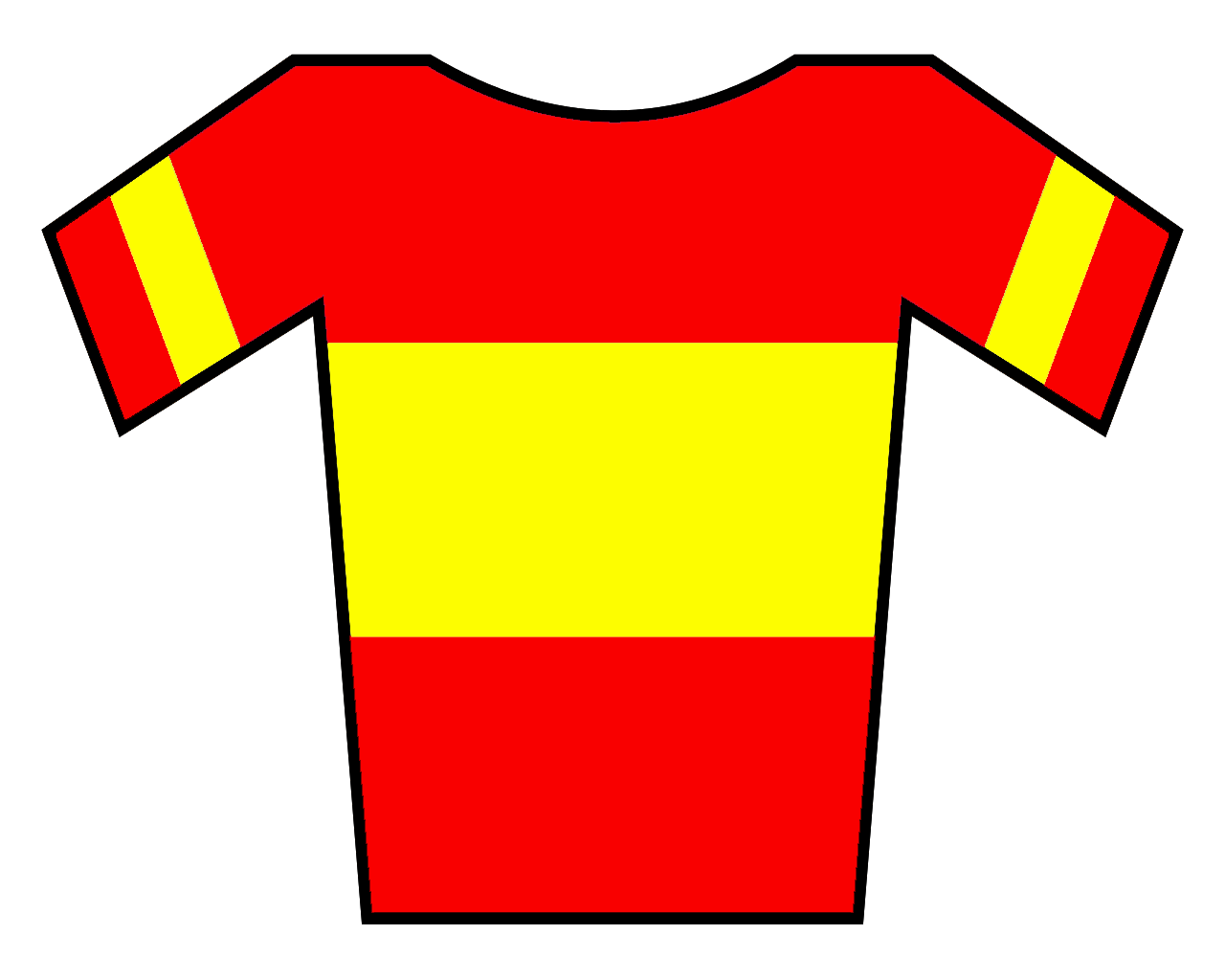
Spanish Champion

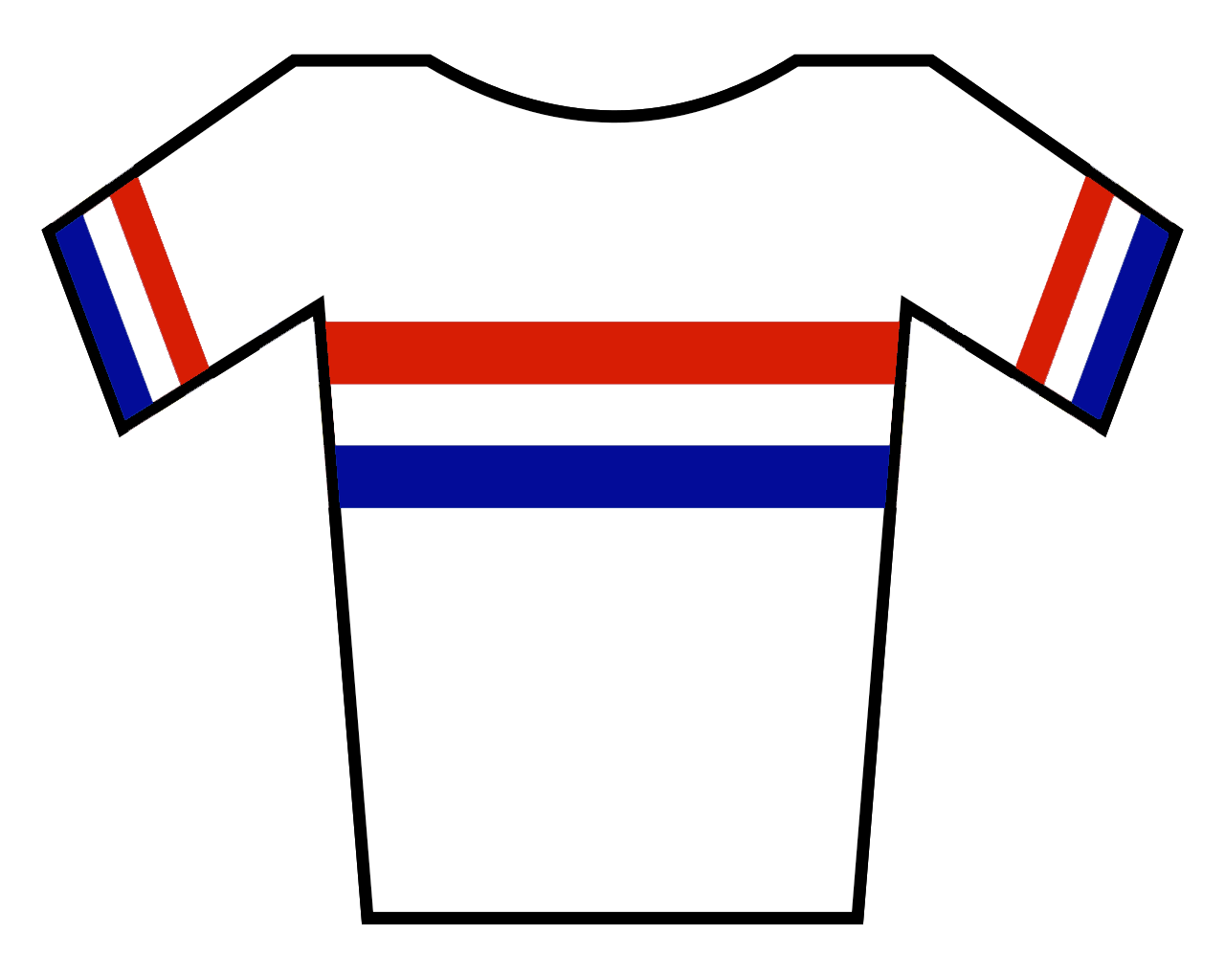
British
Champion

The winner of each national championship wears the national jersey in all their races for the next year in the respective discipline, apart from the World Championships and the Olympics, or unless they wear a category leader's jersey in a stage race. Most national champion jerseys tend to represent a country's flag or use the colours from it. Jerseys may also feature traditional sporting colours of a country that are not derived from a national flag, such as the green and gold on the jerseys of Australian national champions.

== 2020 champions ==
=== Men's Elite ===
Country	Men's Elite Road Race Champion	Road Race Champion's Team	Men's Elite Time Trial Champion	Time Trial Champion's Team
Albania	Ylber Sefa	Tarteletto–Isorex	Ylber Sefa	Tarteletto–Isorex
Antigua and Barbuda				
Argentina				
Australia	Cameron Meyer	Mitchelton–Scott	Luke Durbridge	Mitchelton–Scott
Austria	Valentin Götzinger	WSA KTM Graz	Matthias Brändle	Israel Start-Up Nation
Azerbaijan				
Barbados	Joshua Kelly	Team SIB	Joshua Kelly	Team SIB
Belarus	Yauhen Sobal	Minsk Cycling Club	Yauheni Karaliok	Minsk Cycling Club
Belgium	Dries De Bondt	Alpecin–Fenix	Wout van Aert	Team Jumbo–Visma
Belize				
Bermuda	Tyler Smith	Winners Edge	Toby Wright	
Botswana	Abeng Malete	Sampada Cycling Team		
Brazil				
British Virgin Islands	Philippe Leroy		Philippe Leroy	
Bulgaria	Teodor Rusev	Nessebar–Vereia	Spas Gyurov	Team Snooze-VSD
Cambodia	Chantou Kim	Cambodia Cycling Academy		
Canada				
Chile				
China	Wang Meiyin	Hengxiang Cycling Team	Xue Ming	
Chinese Taipei	Chen Jian-liang	Taichung City Dajia High School cycling team	Sergio Tu	Equipo Kern Pharma
Colombia	Sergio Higuita	EF Pro Cycling	Daniel Martínez	EF Pro Cycling
Croatia	Josip Rumac	Androni Giocattoli–Sidermec	Josip Rumac	Androni Giocattoli–Sidermec
Cuba				
Cyprus	Andreas Miltiadis	Gios–Kiwi Atlántico	Andreas Miltiadis	Gios–Kiwi Atlántico
Czech Republic	Adam Ťoupalík	Elkov–Kasper	Josef Černý	CCC Team
Denmark	Kasper Asgreen	Deceuninck–Quick-Step	Kasper Asgreen	Deceuninck–Quick-Step
Ecuador				
Eritrea				
El Salvador			Dagoberto Joya	
Estonia	Norman Vahtra	Israel Start-Up Nation	Gleb Karpenko	Tartu2024–BalticChainCycling.com
Ethiopia				
Fiji	Umendra Kumar		James McGrogan	
Finland	Antti-Jussi Juntunen	Tartu2024–BalticChainCycling.com	Ukko Iisakki Peltonen	Tartu2024–BalticChainCycling.com
France	Arnaud Démare	Groupama–FDJ	Rémi Cavagna	Deceuninck–Quick-Step
Georgia				
Germany	Marcel Meisen	Alpecin–Fenix		
Greece	Periklis Ilias	P.S.Kronos Nikaias	Polychronis Tzortzakis	P. O. H. Talos
Grenada	Danny Scott		Danny Scott	
Guatemala				
Guyana				
Honduras			Pablo Cruz	PC Endurance Coaching
Hong Kong				
Hungary	Viktor Filutás	Giotti Victoria	Barnabás Peák	Mitchelton–Scott
India	Punay Pratap Singh		Naveen Thomas John	
Iran				
Ireland	Ben Healy	Trinity Racing	Conn McDunphy	CC Nogent-sur-Oise
Iceland	Hafsteinn Geirsson		Ingvar Ómarsson	Novator–Örninn
Israel	Omer Goldstein	Israel Start-Up Nation	Guy Sagiv	Israel Start-Up Nation
Italy	Giacomo Nizzolo	NTT Pro Cycling	Filippo Ganna	Team Ineos
Ivory Coast	Issiaka Cissé	Team Cycliste Azuréen		
Japan				
Kazakhstan				
Kosovo	Albion Ymeri	KÇ Prishtina	Albion Ymeri	KÇ Prishtina
Latvia	Viesturs Lukševics	Amore & Vita–Prodir	Andris Vosekalns	Hengxiang Cycling Team
Lithuania	Gediminas Bagdonas	Klaipėda/Splendid Cycling Team	Evaldas Šiškevičius	Nippo–Delko–One Provence
Luxembourg	Kevin Geniets	Groupama–FDJ	Bob Jungels	Deceuninck–Quick-Step
Mali			Yaya Diallo	Club Airness
Malta			Etienne Bonello	Team Greens CC
Malaysia	Akmal Hakim Zakaria	Team Sapura Cycling	Muhammad Nur Aiman Rosli	Team Sapura Cycling
Moldova	Cristian Raileanu	Team Sapura Cycling	Cristian Raileanu	Team Sapura Cycling
Mexico	Ulises Alfredo Castillo	Elevate–Webiplex Pro Cycling	Ignacio Prado	Canel's–Zerouno
Mongolia	Maral-Erdene Batmunkh	Terengganu Inc. TSG	Enkhtaivan Bolorerdene	
Montenegro	Danilo Vukčević	BK Džada	Danilo Vukčević	BK Džada
Mauritius	Alexandre Mayer	WB-Fybolia Locminé	Yannick Lincoln	Moka Rangers SC
Namibia	Dan Craven	Embrace the World	Drikus Coetzee	Hollard Insure
Netherlands	Mathieu van der Poel	Alpecin–Fenix		
New Zealand	Shane Archbold	Deceuninck–Quick-Step	Hamish Bond	Waikato Bay of Plenty
Nicaragua	Oscar Danilo Hernandez Gonzalez	ECUM	David Castrillo	EDA Contractor
North Macedonia	Nikola Lefkov		Bojan Naumovski	
Norway	Sven Erik Bystrøm	UAE Team Emirates	Andreas Leknessund	Uno-X Pro Cycling Team
Panama	Christofer Jurado	Terengganu Inc. TSG	Christofer Jurado	Terengganu Inc. TSG
Paraguay	Víctor Grange	Paraguay Cycles Club	Francisco Daniel Riveros	Paraguay Cycles Club
Peru	Royner Navarro	GH-Antarkis		
Poland	Stanislaw Aniolkowski	CCC Development Team	Kamil Gradek	CCC Team
Portugal	Rui Costa	UAE Team Emirates	Ivo Oliveira	UAE Team Emirates
Puerto Rico				
Qatar	Marwan Al Jalham	Rasen Adventure Shop	Fadhel Al Khater	Rasen Adventure Shop
Romania	Daniel Crista	CSA Steaua București	Serghei Țvetcov	Team Sapura Cycling
Russia	Sergey Shilov	Aviludo–Louletano	Artem Ovechkin	Terengganu Inc. TSG
Rwanda				
Saudi Arabia			Mostafa Alrabie	
Serbia	Đorđe Đurić		Veljko Stojnić	Vini Zabù–KTM
Singapore				
Slovakia	Juraj Sagan	Bora–Hansgrohe	Ján Andrej Cully	Dukla Banská Bystrica
Slovenia	Primož Roglič	Team Jumbo–Visma	Tadej Pogačar	UAE Team Emirates
South Korea	Park Sang-hong	LX Cycling Team	Choe Hyeong-min	Geumsan Insam Cello
Spain	Luis León Sánchez	Astana	Pello Bilbao	Bahrain–McLaren
Saint Vincent and the Grenadines	Antonio Richardson		Zefal Trevor Bailey	
Sweden	Kim Magnusson	Riwal Securitas	Jacob Ahlsson	Maifracing
Switzerland	Stefan Küng	Groupama–FDJ	Stefan Küng	Groupama–FDJ
South Africa	Ryan Gibbons	NTT Pro Cycling	Daryl Impey	Mitchelton–Scott
Thailand	Sakchai Phodingam		Sarawut Sirironnachai	Thailand Continental Cycling Team
Taiwan	Chen Chien-liang	Memil Pro Cycling	Sergio Tu	Equipo Kern Pharma
Togo				
Turkey	Onur Balkan	Salcano–Sakarya BB Team	Mustafa Sayar	Salcano–Sakarya BB Team
Ukraine	Mykhaylo Kononenko		Mykhaylo Kononenko	
United Arab Emirates				
United Kingdom	Cancelled			
United States	Cancelled			
Uruguay				
Uzbekistan	Muradjan Khalmuratov			
Venezuela	Robert Sierra	Venezuela País de Futuro – Fina Arroz Táchira		

==== Champions in UCI WorldTeams ====
Team	Road Race Champions	Time Trial Champions
AG2R La Mondiale		
Astana	Luis León Sánchez (ESP)	
Bahrain–McLaren		Pello Bilbao (ESP)
Bora–Hansgrohe	Juraj Sagan (SVK)	
CCC Team		Josef Černý (CZE); Kamil Gradek (POL)
Cofidis		
Deceuninck–Quick-Step	Kasper Asgreen (DEN); Shane Archbold (NZL)	Kasper Asgreen (DEN); Rémi Cavagna (FRA); Bob Jungels (LUX)
EF Pro Cycling	Sergio Higuita (COL)	Daniel Martínez (COL)
Groupama–FDJ	Arnaud Démare (FRA); Kevin Geniets (LUX); Stefan Küng (SUI)	Stefan Küng (SUI)
Israel Start-Up Nation	Norman Vahtra (EST); Omer Goldstein (ISR)	Matthias Brändle (AUT); Guy Sagiv (ISR)
Lotto–Soudal		
Mitchelton–Scott	Cameron Meyer (AUS)	Luke Durbridge (AUS); Barnabás Peák (HUN); Daryl Impey (RSA)
Movistar Team		
NTT Pro Cycling	Giacomo Nizzolo (ITA); Ryan Gibbons (RSA)	
Ineos Grenadiers		Filippo Ganna (ITA)
Team Jumbo–Visma	Primož Roglič (SLO)	Wout van Aert (BEL)
Team Sunweb		
Trek–Segafredo		
UAE Team Emirates	Sven Erik Bystrøm (NOR); Rui Costa (POR)	Ivo Oliveira (POR); Tadej Pogačar (SLO)

=== Women's Elite ===
Country	Women's Elite Road Race Champion	Road Race Champion's Team	Women's Elite Time Trial Champion	Time Trial Champion's Team
Antigua and Barbuda				
Argentina				
Australia	Amanda Spratt	Mitchelton–Scott	Sarah Gigante	Tibco–Silicon Valley Bank
Austria	Kathrin Schweinberger	Doltcini–Van Eyck–Proximus	Anna Kiesenhofer	Lotto–Soudal Ladies
Barbados	Amber Joseph	WCC Team	Amber Joseph	WCC Team
Belarus	Tatsiana Sharakova	Minsk Cycling Club	Tatsiana Sharakova	Minsk Cycling Club
Belgium	Lotte Kopecky	Lotto–Soudal Ladies	Lotte Kopecky	Lotto–Soudal Ladies
Belize				
Bermuda	Rose-Anna Hoey	V. T. Construction-Madison	Caitlin Conyers	
Botswana				
Brazil				
British Virgin Islands			Fleecy Prentice	
Bulgaria	Petya Minkova	Nessebar–Vereia	Petya Minkova	Nessebar–Vereia
Canada				
Chile				
Colombia	María Catalina Gómez	Colnago CM Team	Ana Sanabria	Agolíco–BMC–PatoBike
Croatia	Maja Perinović	Top Girls Fassa Bortolo	Mia Radotić	Cogeas–Mettler–Look
Cuba				
Cyprus	Antri Christoforou	Doltcini–Van Eyck–Proximus	Antri Christoforou	Doltcini–Van Eyck–Proximus
Czech Republic	Jarmila Machačová	Team Dukla Praha	Nikola Nosková	Équipe Paule Ka
Denmark	Emma Cecilie Norsgaard	Équipe Paule Ka	Amalie Dideriksen	Boels–Dolmans
Dominican Republic				
Ecuador				
El Salvador			Xenia Estrada	Garmin El Salvador
Eritrea				
Estonia	Aidi Gerde Tuisk	CFC Spordiklubi	Mari-Liis Möttus	Haanja Rattaklubi
Fiji			Sadie Pattie	
Finland	Minna-Maria Kangas	Team Toni&Toni	Minna-Maria Kangas	Team Toni&Toni
France	Audrey Cordon-Ragot	Trek–Segafredo	Juliette Labous	Team Sunweb
Germany	Lisa Brennauer	Ceratizit–WNT Pro Cycling		
Greece	Athina Chatzistyli	A.O. Thiseas	Varvara Fasoi	Porto Leone Cycling Academy
Guyana				
Honduras			Karen Canales	Guerreras 0801
Hong Kong				
Hungary	Kata Blanka Vas	Doltcini–Van Eyck–Proximus	Barbara Benkó	Ghost Factory Racing Team
Iceland	Agusta Edda Bjornsdóttir		Agusta Edda Bjornsdóttir	
Ireland	Lara Gillespie	UCD Cycling Club	Eve McCrystal	Strata3 VeloRevolution Cycling Team
Israel	Omer Shapira	Canyon//SRAM	Omer Shapira	Canyon//SRAM
Italy	Elisa Longo Borghini	Trek–Segafredo	Elisa Longo Borghini	Trek–Segafredo
Japan				
Kazakhstan				
Latvia				
Lithuania			Kataržina Sosna	Team Torpado Südtirol
Luxembourg	Christine Majerus	Boels–Dolmans	Christine Majerus	Boels–Dolmans
Malta			Michelle Vella Wood	Team Greens CC
Malaysia	Siti Nur Adibah Akma Mohd Fuad	Johor A	Siti Nur Adibah Akma Mohd Fuad	Johor A
Mexico	Maria Antonieta Gaxiola	Agolíco–BMC–PatoBike	Andrea Ramírez	Agolíco–BMC–PatoBike
Moldova	Tatiana Cotiga		Tatiana Cotiga	
Mongolia	Anujin Jinjiibadam		Anujin Jinjiibadam	
Montenegro			Žana Pavićević	BK Pljevlja
Namibia	Vera Adrian	RE/MAX	Melissa Hinz	
Netherlands	Anna van der Breggen	Boels–Dolmans		
New Zealand	Niamh Fisher-Black	Bigla–Katusha	Teresa Adams	Waikato Bay of Plenty
Nicaragua	Maria José Silva	Bike Fun Run	Maria José Silva	Bike Fun Run
Norway	Mie Bjørndal Ottestad	De Sprinters Malderen	Katrine Aalerud	Movistar Team
Panama	Cristina Mata	Team RPC Radio	Cristina Mata	Team RPC Radio
Paraguay	Agua Marina Espínola	Massi–Tactic	Agua Marina Espínola	Massi–Tactic
Philippines				
Poland	Marta Lach	CCC - Liv	Anna Plichta	Trek–Segafredo
Portugal	Melissa Maia	Farto–Aguas do Paraño	Raquel Queirós	Velo Performance Cycling Team
Puerto Rico				
Romania	Manuela Mureșan		Maria Ecaterina Stancu	
Russia	Diana Klimova	Cogeas–Mettler–Look	Elizaveta Oshurkova	Cogeas–Mettler–Look
Rwanda				
Saudi Arabia			Ahlam Nasser Al-Zaid	
Serbia	Ivana Vilim		Ivana Vilim	
Singapore				
Slovakia	Tereza Medveďová	WCC Team	Tereza Medveďová	WCC Team
Slovenia	Urša Pintar	Alé BTC Ljubljana	Urška Žigart	Alé BTC Ljubljana
Sweden	Nathalie Eklund	Stockholm Cykelklubb	Lisa Nordén	Team HIQ
Switzerland	Elise Chabbey	Équipe Paule Ka	Marlen Reusser	Équipe Paule Ka
Spain	Mavi García	Alé BTC Ljubljana	Mavi García	Alé BTC Ljubljana
South Africa	Ashleigh Moolman	CCC - Liv	Ashleigh Moolman	CCC - Liv
Thailand	Jutatip Maneephan	Alé BTC Ljubljana	Phetdarin Somrat	Thailand Women's Cycling Team
Taiwan				
Tunisia				
United Kingdom	Cancelled			
Ukraine	Anna Nahirna	Lviv Cycling Team	Olga Shekel	Astana
United States	Cancelled			
Uzbekistan	Yanina Kuskova			
Venezuela	Yngrid Porras	Distrito Capital		

==== Champions in UCI Women's teams ====
Team	Road Race Champions	Time Trial Champions
Agolíco–BMC–PatoBike	Maria Antonieta Gaxiola (MEX)	Ana Sanabria (COL); Andrea Ramírez (MEX)
Alé BTC Ljubljana	Mavi García (ESP); Urša Pintar (SLO); Jutatip Maneephan (THA)	Mavi García (ESP); Urška Žigart (SLO)
Arkéa Pro Cycling Team		
Aromitalia–Basso Bikes–Vaiano		
Astana		Olga Shekel (UKR)
Bepink		
Biehler Krush Pro Cycling		
Bizkaia–Durango		
Boels–Dolmans	Christine Majerus (LUX); Anna van der Breggen (NED)	Amalie Dideriksen (DEN); Christine Majerus (LUX)
CAMS–Tifosi		
Canyon//SRAM	Omer Shapira (ISR)	Omer Shapira (ISR)
CCC - Liv	Marta Lach (POL); Ashleigh Moolman (RSA)	Ashleigh Moolman (RSA)
Ceratizit–WNT Pro Cycling	Lisa Brennauer (GER)	
Charente-Maritime Women Cycling		
Chevalmeire Cycling Team		
Ciclotel		
Cogeas–Mettler–Look	Diana Klimova (RUS)	Mia Radotić (CRO); Elizaveta Oshurkova (RUS)
DNA Pro Cycling		
Doltcini–Van Eyck–Proximus	Kathrin Schweinberger (AUT); Antri Christoforou (CYP); Kata Blanka Vas (HUN)	Antri Christoforou (CYP)
Drops		
Eneicat–RBH Global		
Équipe Paule Ka	Emma Cecilie Norsgaard (DEN); Niamh Fisher-Black (NZL); Elise Chabbey (SUI)	Nikola Nosková (CZE); Marlen Reusser (SUI)
Eurotarget–Bianchi–Vittoria		
FDJ Nouvelle-Aquitaine Futuroscope		
Hitec Products–Birk Sport		
InstaFund La Prima		
Lotto–Soudal Ladies	Lotte Kopecky (BEL)	Anna Kiesenhofer (AUT); Lotte Kopecky (BEL)
Lviv Cycling Team	Anna Nahirna (UKR)	
Macogep Tornatech Girondins de Bordeaux		
Massi–Tactic	Agua Marina Espínola (PAR)	Agua Marina Espínola (PAR)
Minsk Cycling Club	Tatsiana Sharakova (BLR)	Tatsiana Sharakova (BLR)
Mitchelton–Scott	Amanda Spratt (AUS)	
Movistar Team		Katrine Aalerud (NOR)
Multum Accountants–LSK Ladies		
NXTG Racing		
Parkhotel Valkenburg		
Pro Cycling Team Fanini		
Rally Cycling		
Río Miera–Cantabria Deporte		
Roxsolt Attaquer		
Servetto–Piumate–Beltrami TSA		
Sestroretsk		
Sopela Women's Team		
Team Illuminate		
Team Sunweb		Juliette Labous (FRA)
Tibco–Silicon Valley Bank		Sarah Gigante (AUS)
Thailand Women's Cycling Team		Phetdarin Somrat (THA)
Top Girls Fassa Bortolo	Maja Perinović (CRO)	
Trek–Segafredo	Audrey Cordon-Ragot (FRA); Elisa Longo Borghini (ITA)	Elisa Longo Borghini (ITA); Anna Plichta (POL)
Valcar–Travel & Service		
VIB–Natural Greatness		
WCC Team	Amber Joseph (BAR); Tereza Medveďová (SVK)	Amber Joseph (BAR); Tereza Medveďová (SVK)
