= 2008 Vuelta a Castilla y León =

Race details
- Dates: 24 March – 28 March
- Stages: 5
- Distance: 630.1 km (391.5 mi)
- Winning time: 15h 57' 37"

Results
Jersey awarded to the overall winner	Winner	Alberto Contador (ESP)	(Astana)
	Second	Mauricio Soler (COL)	(Barloworld)
	Third	Thomas Dekker (NED)	(Rabobank)
	Points	Thomas Dekker (NED)	(Rabobank)
	Mountains	Ivan Melero Coco (ESP)	(Orbea–Oreka SDA)
	Combination	Alberto Contador (ESP)	(Astana)
	Team	(Netherlands) Rabobank	

The 2008 Vuelta a Castilla y León was the 23rd edition of the Vuelta a Castilla y León road cycling stage race, started on 24 March in Valsain, and concluded on 28 March in Riaño. The race was won by Alberto Contador.

== Teams ==
Sixteen teams of up to eight riders started the race:

- Astana
- Euskaltel–Euskadi
- Caisse d'Epargne
- Saunier Duval–Scott
- Rabobank
- Team CSC
- Benfica
- Garmin–Chipotle p/b H30
- Diquigiovanni–Androni
- Barloworld
- Andalucía–Cajasur
- Karpin–Galicia
- Extremadura–Gruppo Gallardo
- Contentpolis–Murcia
- Orbea–Oreka SDA
- Burgos Monumental

== Final standings ==
General classification

	Cyclist	Team	Time
1	Alberto Contador (ESP)	Astana	15h 57' 37"
2	Mauricio Soler (COL)	Barloworld	+ 39"
3	Thomas Dekker (NED)	Rabobank	+ 46"
4	Levi Leipheimer (USA)	Astana	+ 1' 09"
5	Denis Menchov (RUS)	Rabobank	+ 1' 23"

Points classification

	Cyclist	Team	Points
1	Thomas Dekker (NED)	Rabobank	72
2	Alberto Contador (ESP)	Astana	62
3	Francisco José Ventoso (ESP)	Andalucía–Cajasur	41
4	Mauricio Soler (COL)	Barloworld	38
5	Koldo Fernández (ESP)	Euskaltel–Euskadi	35

Mountains classification

	Cyclist	Team	Points
1	Ivan Melero Coco (ESP)	Orbea–Oreka SDA	17
2	Alberto Contador (ESP)	Astana	10
3	Enrique Salgueiro (ESP)	Extremadura-Gruppo Gallardo	9
4	Mauricio Soler (COL)	Barloworld	8
5	Xavier Zandio (ESP)	Caisse d'Epargne	8

Combination classification

	Cyclist	Team	Points
1	Alberto Contador (ESP)	Astana	3
2	Mauricio Soler (COL)	Barloworld	3
3	Thomas Dekker (NED)	Rabobank	3
4	Denis Menchov (RUS)	Rabobank	3
5	Levi Leipheimer (USA)	Astana	3

Team Classification

	Team	Time
1	Rabobank	47h 55' 59"
2	Barloworld	+ 1' 56"
3	Saunier Duval–Scott	+ 3' 18"
4	Team CSC	+ 3' 35"
5	Benfica	+ 3' 47"

== Jersey progress ==
Stage (Winner)	General Classification	Points Classification	Mountains Classification	Combination classification	Team Classification
Stage 1 (ITT) (Alberto Contador)	Alberto Contador	Alberto Contador	Not Awarded	Alberto Contador	Astana Team
Stage 2 (Karsten Kroon)	Alberto Contador	Alberto Contador	Ivan Melero	Daniele Nardello	Slipstream–Chipotle
Stage 3 (Francisco José Ventoso)	Alberto Contador	Alberto Contador	Ivan Melero	Daniele Nardello	Slipstream–Chipotle
Stage 4 (Alberto Contador)	Alberto Contador	Alberto Contador	Ivan Melero	Alberto Contador	Rabobank
Stage 5 (Koldo Fernández)	Alberto Contador	Thomas Dekker	Ivan Melero	Alberto Contador	Rabobank
Final	Alberto Contador	Thomas Dekker	Ivan Melero	Alberto Contador	Rabobank
