= Isabella Bertold =

Canadian sailor and cyclist

Personal information
- Full name: Isabella Bertold
- Born: 4 February 1991 (age 35)
- Cycling career
- Sport: Cycling
- Discipline: Road
- Role: Rider

Amateur team
- 2019: InstaFund La Prima

Professional team
- 2020–2023: InstaFund La Prima

Sport
- Sport: Sailing; Road bicycle racing

Isabella Bertold (born 4 February 1991) is a Canadian sailor and cyclist, who competes in the Laser radial class in sailing, and who rode for UCI Women's Continental Team InstaFund Racing in cycling. At one time she ranked in the top 10 of the world in Laser Radial women sailors. She lives in Vancouver, British Columbia.

== Career ==
After a successful youth and junior careers, she finished 7th at the 2013 World Laser Radial Women's Championship. She was named Sail Canada 2013 Female Athlete of the Year. She placed 18th at the 2014 ISAF Sailing World Championships and 15th at the Olympic qualification ranking to earn a quota at the 2016 Summer Olympics for Canada. She was ranked consistently in the top 10 female Laser Radial sailors between 2012 and 2015, reaching world number 2 at her best.
