= Sara Van de Vel =

Belgian cyclist

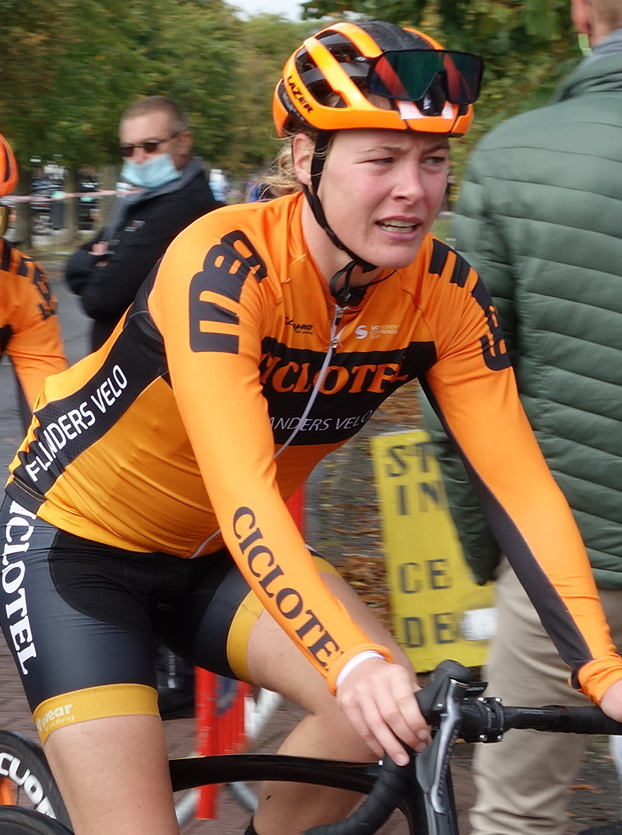
- Van de Vel at the 2020 La Flèche Wallonne

Personal information
- Full name: Sara Van de Vel
- Born: 6 August 1994 (age 32)

Cycling career
- Sport: Cycling
- Discipline: Road
- Role: Rider

Professional teams
- 2020: Ciclotel
- 2021: Team Rupelcleaning–Champion Lubricants
- 2022: IBCT
- 2023: Fenix–Deceuninck Continental

Sara Van de Vel (born 6 August 1994) is a Belgian professional racing cyclist and triathlete, who rode for UCI Women's Continental Team Team Rupelcleaning–Champion Lubricants. She rode in the women's time trial event at the 2020 UCI Road World Championships.

== Major results ==
2021
1st Binche–Chimay–Binche pour Dames
