= Enrique Salgueiro =

Spanish bicycle racer

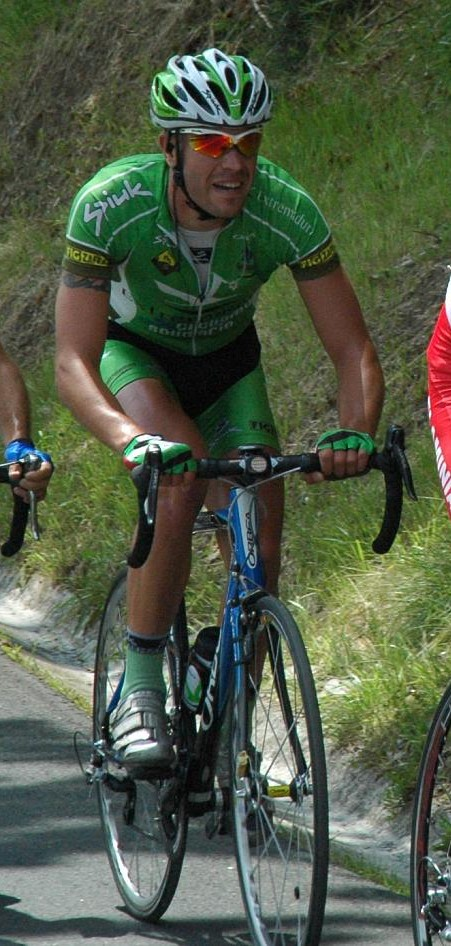
- Salgueiro in 2008

Personal information
- Full name: Enrique Salgueiro Alonso
- Born: 2 May 1981 (age 45) Redondela, Spain

Cycling career
- Sport: Cycling
- Current team: Java Kiwi Atlántico
- Discipline: Road
- Role: Rider

Amateur teams
- 2002: PSA Vigo
- 2009–2010: Extremadura–Spiuk
- 2011: LA–Antarte
- 2013: Club Rias Baixas
- 2014–2015: LolaLola–Gomistar

Professional teams
- 2003–2004: Beppi–Ovarense
- 2005–2006: Extremadura–Spiuk
- 2007: Karpin–Galicia
- 2008: Extremadura
- 2012: LA–Antarte

Managerial team
- 2019–: Guerciotti–Kiwi Atlantico

Enrique Salgueiro Alonso (born 2 May 1981 in Redondela) is a Spanish former cyclist, who currently works as a directeur sportif for UCI Continental team Java Kiwi Atlántico.

== Major results ==
2005
1st Overall Vuelta a León

1st Stage 2

2006
1st Stage 2 Tour des Pyrénées
2009
1st Stage 2 Cinturón a Mallorca
1st Stage 3 Vuelta a Extramadura
2010
1st Stage 5 Vuelta a León
2011
1st Stage 2 Trofeú Joaquim Agostinho
