= Gabby Traxler =

Canadian cyclist

Personal information
- Full name: Anna Gabrielle Traxler
- Born: 10 May 1998 (age 28)

Cycling career
- Sport: Cycling
- Discipline: Road
- Role: Rider

Professional teams
- 2019: Charente-Maritime Women Cycling
- 2020–2021: InstaFund La Prima

Anna Gabrielle "Gabby" Traxler (born 10 May 1998) is a Canadian professional racing cyclist, who rode for UCI Women's Continental Team InstaFund Racing in 2021.

Traxler has also represented the Canadian national team in professional races, and in 2015, competed in the women's junior road race at the 2015 UCI Road World Championships.

Traxler is from Calgary, Alberta. As a child she competed in ski jumping, cross country skiing, soccer, and cross country running. At fifteen she took up cycling in various disciplines of the sport. She showed great promise and was selected for the 2015 UCI Road World Championships as a first-year junior. She then moved to France to focus on road racing for two years.

In 2023, while on a training ride, Gabby was hit by a car and suffered severe facial and leg injuries.
