= Binche–Chimay–Binche =

Belgian one-day road cycling race

Race details
- Date: Early October
- Region: Wallonia, Belgium
- Local name(s): Binche–Chimay–Binche; Memorial Frank Vandenbroucke
- Discipline: Road race
- Competition: UCI Europe Tour
- Type: Single-day race
- Web site: www.binche-chimay-binche.eu

History
- First edition: 1911
- Editions: 38 (as of 2026)
- First winner: Jean Van Ingelghem (BEL)
- Most wins: Omer Taverne (BEL); Jelle Nijdam (NED); Danny van Poppel (NED)(2 wins)
- Most recent: Paul Magnier (FRA)

History (women)
- First winner: Sara Van de Vel (BEL)
- Most recent: Linda Riedmann (GER)

Binche–Chimay–Binche (also known as Memorial Frank Vandenbroucke) is a single-day road bicycle race held annually between Binche and Chimay, in Wallonia, Belgium. The race is rated as a 1.1 event on the UCI Europe Tour.

The race was originally held between Binche and Tournai. It was first organized in 1911 as Binche-Tournai-Binche; suspended between 1931 and 1983, but revived again between 1997 and 2009. In 2010, it was organized as the "Binche Tournai Binche/Memorial Frank Vandenbroucke", to commemorate cyclist Frank Vandenbroucke who died in October 2009 (at age 34) and the most recent winner of the race. In 2013, the routing changed from Tournai to Chimay, hence the name changed to Binche–Chimay–Binche.

A women's race has been held since 2021, and is rated as a 1.1 category UCI event.

== Winners ==
=== Men ===
| Year | Country | Rider | Team |
|---|---|---|---|
| 1911 | Belgium | Jean Van Ingelghem | Individual |
| 1912 | Belgium | Félix Sellier | Individual |
| 1913; 1921 | No race | | |
| 1922 | Belgium | Omer Taverne | Individual |
| 1923 | Belgium | Achille Vermandel | Unknown |
| 1924 | Belgium | Hector Martin | Unknown |
| 1925 | Belgium | Arthur Dewit | Unknown |
| 1926 | Belgium | Omer Taverne | Unknown |
| 1927 | Belgium | Jean Hans | Unknown |
| 1928; 1929 | No race | | |
| 1930 | Belgium | Alfons Kindt | Unknown |
| 1931; 1983 | No race | | |
| 1984 | Belgium | Benny Van Brabant | Tönissteiner-Lotto-Mavic-Pecotex |
| 1985 | Netherlands | Adri Van Der Poel | Kwantum–Decosol–Yoko |
| 1986 | Belgium | Ronny Van Holen | Joker–Emerxil–Merckx |
| 1987 | Belgium | Willem Van Eynde | Joker–Merckx |
| 1988 | Belgium | Nico Emonds | Superconfex–Yoko–Opel–Colnago |
| 1989 | France | Dominique Gaigne | Histor-Sigma |
| 1990 | Netherlands | Jelle Nijdam | Buckler–Colnago–Decca |
| 1991 | Belgium | Michel Dernies | Weinmann-EVS |
| 1992 | Belgium | Jean-Marie Wampers | Collstrop-Garden Wood-Histor |
| 1993 | Belgium | Patrick Van Roosbroeck | La William-Duvel |
| 1994 | Belgium | Wilfried Nelissen | Novemail–Histor–Laser Computer |
| 1995 | Netherlands | Jelle Nijdam | TVM–Polis Direct |
| 1996 | Belgium | Frank Vandenbroucke | Mapei–GB |
| 1997; 2009 | No race | | |
| 2010 | Italy | Elia Viviani | Liquigas–Doimo |
| 2011 | Germany | Rüdiger Selig | Leopard Trek |
| 2012 | Great Britain | Adam Blythe | BMC Racing Team |
| 2013 | South Africa | Reinardt Janse van Rensburg | Argos–Shimano |
| 2014 | Czech Republic | Zdeněk Štybar | Omega Pharma–Quick-Step |
| 2015 | Netherlands | Ramon Sinkeldam | Team Giant–Alpecin |
| 2016 | France | Arnaud Démare | FDJ |
| 2017 | Belgium | Jasper De Buyst | Lotto–Soudal |
| 2018 | Netherlands | Danny van Poppel | LottoNL–Jumbo |
| 2019 | Belgium | Tom Van Asbroeck | Israel Cycling Academy |
| 2020 | No race due to COVID-19 pandemic in Belgium | | |
| 2021 | Netherlands | Danny van Poppel | Intermarché–Wanty–Gobert Matériaux |
| 2022 | France | Christophe Laporte | Team Jumbo–Visma |
| 2023 | Italy | Luca Mozzato | Arkéa–Samsic |
| 2024 | Belgium | Arnaud De Lie | Lotto–Dstny |
| 2025 | Belgium | Jordi Meeus | Red Bull–Bora–Hansgrohe |
| 2026 | France | Paul Magnier | Soudal–Quick-Step |

=== Women ===
| Year | Country | Rider | Team |
|---|---|---|---|
| 2021 | Belgium | Sara Van de Vel | Team Rupelcleaning–Champion Lubricants |
| 2022 | Netherlands | Lorena Wiebes | SD Worx |
| 2023 | Great Britain | Pfeiffer Georgi | Team DSM |
| 2024 | Great Britain | Cat Ferguson | Movistar Team |
| 2025 | Netherlands | Lorena Wiebes | Team SD Worx–Protime |
| 2026 | Germany | Linda Riedmann | Lotto–Intermarché Ladies |
