= Antonia Gröndahl =

Finnish cyclist

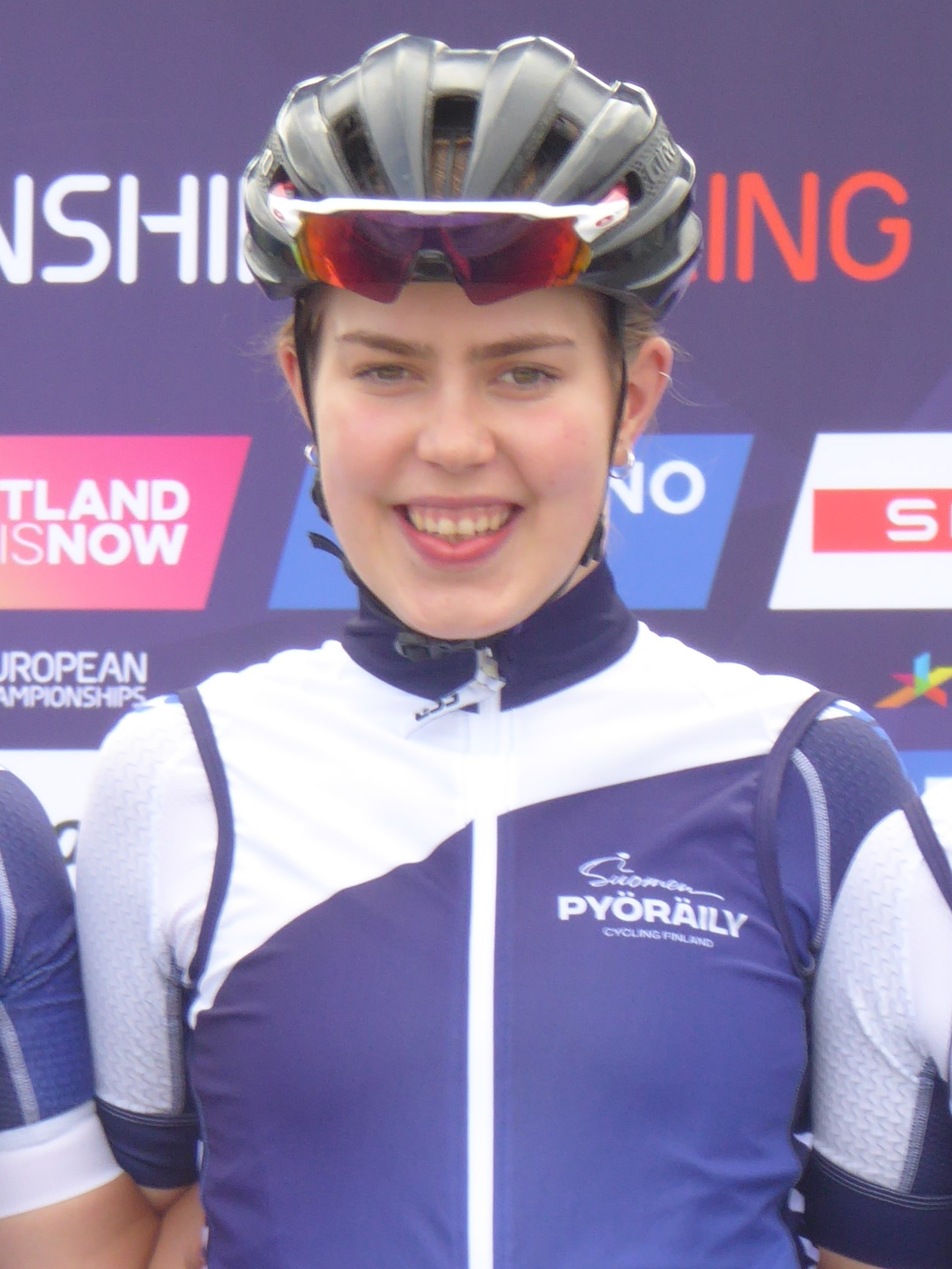
- Gröndahl at the 2018 European Road Cycling Championships.

Personal information
- Full name: Antonia Gröndahl
- Born: 25 May 1995 (age 31) Pargas, Finland

Cycling career
- Sport: Cycling
- Discipline: Road
- Role: Rider

Amateur team
- 2017–2020: Isorex Cycling Team

Professional teams
- 2021: Team Rupelcleaning–Champion Lubricants
- 2022: IBCT
- 2023: Duolar-Chevalmeire
- 2024: Chevalmeire

Antonia Gröndahl (born 25 May 1995) is a Finnish professional racing cyclist, who rode for UCI Women's Continental Team Chevalmeire in 2024. She rode in the women's road race at the 2016 UCI Road World Championships, but she did not finish the race.
