= Tashkent Cycling Team =

Uzbekistan cycling team

Team information
- UCI code: TAS
- Registered: Uzbekistan
- Founded: 2018
- Disbanded: 2018
- Discipline: Road
- Status: UCI Continental

Team name history
- 2018: Tashkent Cycling Team

The Tashkent Cycling Team was an Uzbek UCI Continental cycling team established in 2018.

== Team roster ==
As at 31 December 2018

Rider	Date of birth
Jakhongir Darmonov (UZB)	13 November 1995 (aged 23)
Andrey Izmaylov (UZB)	5 June 1997 (aged 21)
Sergey Medvedev (cyclist) (UZB)	14 January 1995 (aged 23)
Dostonbek Ollamov (UZB)	10 October 1997 (aged 21)
Shomansur Sbdumannnabov (UZB)	26 October 1996 (aged 22)

Rider	Date of birth
Semyon Sevastyanov (UZB)	31 July 1998 (aged 20)
Roman Shukurov (UZB)	17 April 1996 (aged 22)
Dilmurdjon Siddikov (UZB)	23 August 1997 (aged 21)
Rustem Sultanov (UZB)	17 December 1997 (aged 21)
Akramjon Sunnatov (UZB)	26 November 1996 (aged 22)
