= Khlong Lam Kong =

Watercourse in Thailand

Coordinates: 16°00′N 101°15′E

Khlong Lam Kong (Thai: คลองลํากง, pronounced [kʰlɔ̄ːŋ lām kōŋ]) is a watercourse in Phetchabun Province, Thailand. It is a tributary of the Pa Sak River, part of the Chao Phraya River basin.
