= María Catalina Gómez =

Colombian cyclist

Personal information
- Full name: María Catalina Gómez Quiza
- Born: 25 May 1995 (age 31)

Cycling career
- Sport: Cycling
- Discipline: Road
- Role: Rider

Amateur teams
- 2020: Avinal–GW–Sistecredito–El Carmen
- 2020: Colnago CM Team

Major wins
- One day races & Classics National Road Race Championships (2020)

María Catalina Gómez Quiza (born 25 May 1995) is a Colombian racing cyclist, best known for winning the 2020 Colombian National Road Race Championships.

== Major results ==
2020
1st Road Race, National Road Championships
8th Grand Prix Develi
