= VIB Sports (women's team) =

Bahraini cycling team

Team information
- UCI code: VIB
- Registered: Bahrain
- Founded: 2019
- Status: National (2019); UCI Women's Continental Team (2020–)

Key personnel
- General manager: Faisal Alenzi
- Team managers: Javier Soler; Bernardo Ordiñana

Team name history
- 2019 2020 2021–: Teika Vib DFM Renta Car; VIB–Natural Greatness; VIB Sports

VIB Sports is a Bahraini women's road bicycle racing team which participates in elite women's races. The team was established in 2019.

== Team roster ==
As of 16 February 2021.

Rider	Date of birth
Maha Abdulbaqi (BHR)	20 December 1989 (age 36)
Hadeer Ahmed (IRQ)	7 July 1989 (age 37)
Amna Alaamer (BHR)	26 June 1982 (age 44)
May Alhaji (BHR)	16 July 1981 (age 45)
Olivia Bentley (GBR)	2 February 1991 (age 35)
Georgia Bullard (GBR)	20 December 2000 (age 25)
Melisa Gómiz (ESP)	8 December 2000 (age 25)

Rider	Date of birth
Maha Habib (BHR)	16 June 1984 (age 42)
Esthefanía Hurtado (ESP)	18 February 2002 (age 24)
Muneera Khamis (BHR)	1 May 2000 (age 26)
Marta Romeu (ESP)	21 May 1992 (age 34)
Sofía Sánchez (ESP)	7 March 2002 (age 24)
Maryoly Sosa (VEN)	25 August 2001 (age 25)
Somayeh Yazdani (IRN)	6 October 1990 (age 35)
