= IBCT (cycling team) =

Belgian-Irish cycling team

Team information
- UCI code: ILB (2019–2020); RUP (2021); IBC (2022–)
- Registered: Ireland
- Founded: 2018
- Discipline: Road
- Status: National (2019–2020); UCI Women's Continental Team (2021–)

Team name history
- 2019–2020 2021 2022: Illi-Bikes Cycling Team; Team Rupelcleaning–Champion Lubricants; IBCT
IBCT jersey
Jersey

IBCT is a Belgian-based, Irish-registered women's road cycling team that was founded in 2018. In its first season in 2019, the team won the Belgian Cup. Following the 2020 season, that was extensively affected by the COVID-19 pandemic in Europe, the team announced their intention to become a UCI Women's Continental Team for the 2021 season.

== Team roster ==
As of 30 January 2021.

Rider	Date of birth
Isabelle Beckers (BEL)	4 March 1983 (age 43)
Svenja Betz (GER)	15 September 1995 (age 30)
Verena Eberhardt (AUT)	6 December 1994 (age 31)
Lara Gillespie (IRL)	21 April 2001 (age 25)
Mia Griffin (IRL)	30 December 1998 (age 27)
Antonia Gröndahl (FIN)	25 May 1995 (age 31)
Gabriella Homer (IRL)	10 September 2000 (age 25)
Amber Lacompte (BEL)	1 January 2000 (age 26)

Rider	Date of birth
Ditte Lenseclaes (BEL)	22 June 1999 (age 27)
Lucy Mayrhofer (GER)	20 September 2002 (age 23)
Kelly Murphy (IRL)	3 November 1989 (age 36)
Maja Perinović (CRO)	24 September 1999 (age 26)
Trine Schmidt (DEN)	3 June 1988 (age 38)
Aline Seitz (SUI)	17 February 1997 (age 29)
Alice Sharpe (IRL)	3 May 1994 (age 32)
Sara Van de Vel (BEL)	6 August 1994 (age 32)

== Major results ==
2021
Binche–Chimay–Binche pour Dames, Sara Van de Vel

== National champions ==
2021
Finland Road Race, Antonia Gröndahl
Croatia Road Race, Maja Perinović
Austria Track (Omnium), Verena Eberhardt
Austria Track (Scratch), Verena Eberhardt
Austria Track (Elimination), Verena Eberhardt
Austria Track (Points race), Verena Eberhardt
Ireland Track, (Individual pursuit), Kelly Murphy
Switzerland Track (Omnium), Aline Seitz
Switzerland Track (Madison), Aline Seitz
Switzerland Track (Points race), Aline Seitz
2022
Ireland Road Race, Alice Sharpe
