= Maja Perinović =

Croatian cyclist

Personal information
- Full name: Maja Perinović
- Born: 24 September 1999 (age 27) Zadar, Croatia

Cycling career
- Sport: Cycling
- Discipline: Road
- Role: Rider

Professional teams
- 2018–2020: Top Girls Fassa Bortolo
- 2021: Team Rupelcleaning–Champion Lubricants

Maja Perinović (born 24 September 1999) is a Croatian former racing cyclist, who last rode for UCI Women's Continental Team Team Rupelcleaning–Champion Lubricants. She rode in the women's road race event at the 2018 UCI Road World Championships.
