= Shoko Kashiki =

Japanese cyclist

Personal information
- Full name: Shoko Kashiki
- Born: 9 November 1993 (age 32)

Cycling career
- Sport: Cycling
- Discipline: Road
- Role: Rider

Professional team
- 2018–2022: Team Illuminate

Shoko Kashiki (born 9 November 1993) is a Japanese professional racing cyclist, who rode for UCI Women's Continental Team Team Illuminate in 2022.
