= Extremadura–Spiuk =

Extremadura-Spiuk
Team information
- Registered: Spain
- Founded: 2005
- Disbanded: 2010
- Discipline: Road
- Status: Professional Continental

Key personnel
- General manager: Tomas Sanchez Duran

Extremadura–Spiuk was a Spanish amateur road bicycle racing team. The team was founded in 2005 and became a UCI Professional Continental team in 2008 before financial problems forced them to become an under-23 amateur team. For the 2008 season, the riders and technical staff acted as their own second sponsor while they searched for a second sponsor. In 2007 the main sponsors were Extremadura and Spiuk. Spuik became the technical sponsor for the team in 2008 and Grupo Gallardo was supposed to be the second sponsor until they pulled out.
