= Java Kiwi Atlántico =

Cycling team

Team information
- UCI code: JAV
- Registered: Spain (2018); Guinea-Bissau (2019); Venezuela (2020–)
- Founded: 2018
- Status: UCI Continental (2019–)
- Bicycles: Gios

Key personnel
- Team managers: Enrique Salgueiro; Xoel Dias; Gerardo Guzmán; Oneire Mora; Mikel Ugarte

Team name history
- 2018–2019 2020 2021 2022–: Guerciotti–Kiwi Atlantico; Gios–Kiwi Atlántico; Gios; Java Kiwi Atlántico

Java Kiwi Atlántico is a UCI Continental road bicycle racing team established in 2018. The team registered with the UCI for the 2019 season.

== History ==
The team was established in 2018 by former professional cyclist Enrique Salgueiro and participated in races mainly on the European and American calendars. It practically ceased activity for the 2023 season but resurfaced at the beginning of 2024 with a new team roster and sponsorship structure as Kamen Pazin - Cabo de Peñas - Kiwi Atlántico.

In February 2024, the International Cycling Union UCI suspended the team, both its manager Enrique Salgueiro and its representative Gerardo Gúzman following allegations of falsifications and misrepresentations of official registration documents. The team was banned from registering with the UCI and declared ineligible for participation in any UCI-sanctioned event until December 2028. Salgueiro was sanctioned with "a suspension from any activity in cycling" until December 2028 and an unspecified fine, while Gúzman was banned from cycling activity until December 2025.

== Team roster ==
As of 22 March 2022.

Rider	Date of birth
Nikiforos Arvanitou (GRE)	13 January 2003 (age 23)
Juan Belandria (VEN)	21 July 1997 (age 29)
José Bruzual (VEN)	21 January 1996 (age 30)
Xavier Cañellas (ESP)	16 March 1997 (age 29)
Louis Contal (FRA)	26 August 1998 (age 28)
Jatniel Figueroa (VEN)	22 July 1996 (age 30)
Alessio Gasparini (ITA)	21 October 1998 (age 27)
Roberto González (PAN)	21 May 1994 (age 32)

Rider	Date of birth
Gaizka Gurrutxaga (ESP)	28 October 2000 (age 25)
Yuki Ishihara (JPN)	5 April 1997 (age 29)
Tomoya Koyama (JPN)	18 July 1998 (age 28)
Barry Miller (USA)	5 December 1988 (age 37)
Andreas Miltiadis (CYP)	30 August 1996 (age 30)
Soh Narumi (JPN)	13 November 1997 (age 28)
Edwin Torres (VEN)	14 February 1997 (age 29)

== Previous rosters ==
=== 2019 ===
Rider	Date of birth
Serguio Aliu Djalo (GBS)	17 December 1997 (age 28)
Quedutar Cul Iala (GBS)	28 November 1997 (age 28)
David Galarreta (ESP)	2 July 1993 (age 33)
Cristian Marc Gomis Lopez Tavarez (GBS)	4 July 1996 (age 30)
Samuel Gonzalez (ESP)	1 August 1997 (age 29)
Manuel Jose Nafiai (GBS)	2 March 1997 (age 29)
Fernando Lopes (ESP)	16 November 1993 (age 32)
Shunhana M'Bali Balu (GBS)	1 June 1997 (age 29)

Rider	Date of birth
Domingos Mendes (GBS)	15 February 1995 (age 31)
Andreas Miltiadis (CYP)	30 August 1996 (age 30)
Mussa Ninto Tchata (GBS)	19 December 1995 (age 30)
Jose Carlos Nuñez (ESP)	23 April 1982 (age 44)
Jesús Alberto Rubio (ESP)	25 January 1992 (age 34)
Paulo Silva (POR)	14 May 1995 (age 31)
Mikel Ugarte (ESP)	14 June 1982 (age 44)

=== 2020 ===
As of 31 March 2020.

Rider	Date of birth
Franklín Chacón (VEN)	16 July 1998 (age 28)
José Cote (VEN)	12 June 2000 (age 26)
Xoel Días (ESP)	20 November 1996 (age 29)
Miguel Ángel Fernández (ESP)	21 March 1997 (age 29)
Junnior Flores (VEN)	14 January 1992 (age 34)
David Galarreta (ESP)	2 July 1993 (age 33)
José Manuel Gutiérrez (ESP)	4 May 1988 (age 38)

Rider	Date of birth
Fernando Lopes (ESP)	16 November 1993 (age 32)
Rumy Maigua (VEN)	22 December 2000 (age 25)
Andreas Miltiadis (CYP)	30 August 1996 (age 30)
Rubén Parra (VEN)	9 February 1987 (age 39)
Yurgen Ramírez (VEN)	23 January 1998 (age 28)
Alejandro Regueiro (ESP)	8 July 1997 (age 29)
Jesús Villegas (VEN)	28 March 1997 (age 29)

=== 2021 ===
As of 11 February 2021.

Rider	Date of birth
Juan Belandria (VEN)	21 July 1997 (age 29)
José Bruzual (VEN)	21 January 1996 (age 30)
Jorge Bueno (ESP)	9 February 1996 (age 30)
Xavier Cañellas (ESP)	16 March 1997 (age 29)
Jatniel Figueroa (VEN)	22 July 1996 (age 30)
David Galarreta (ESP)	2 July 1993 (age 33)

Rider	Date of birth
Luis Kleiber García (VEN)	8 August 1999 (age 27)
José Manuel Gutiérrez (ESP)	4 May 1988 (age 38)
Fernando Lopes (ESP)	16 November 1993 (age 32)
Clever Martínez (VEN)	27 November 1990 (age 35)
Andreas Miltiadis (CYP)	30 August 1996 (age 30)
Erlend Sør-Reime (NOR)	23 October 1995 (age 30)

== National Champions ==
2019
Cyprus Time Trial, Andreas Miltiadis
Cyprus Road Race, Andreas Miltiadis
2020
Cyprus Time Trial, Andreas Miltiadis
Cyprus Road Race, Andreas Miltiadis
2021
Cyprus Time Trial, Andreas Miltiadis
Cyprus Road Race, Andreas Miltiadis
2022
Cyprus Time Trial, Andreas Miltiadis
Cyprus Road Race, Andreas Miltiadis
2023
Cyprus Time Trial, Andreas Miltiadis
