= Platform Pro Cycling =

Canadian cycling team

Team information
- UCI code: INS (2019); ILP (2020–)
- Registered: Canada
- Founded: 2019
- Status: National (2019); UCI Women's Continental Team (2020–)

Team name history
- 2019–2020 2021–2023 2024–: InstaFund La Prima; InstaFund Racing; Platform Pro Cycling

Platform Pro Cycling is a Canadian women's road bicycle racing team which participates in elite women's races. The team was established in 2019.

== Team roster ==
As of 18 May 2021.

Rider	Date of birth
Ngaire Barraclough (CAN)	20 July 2002 (age 24)
Caroline Baur (SUI)	17 April 1994 (age 32)
Isabella Bertold (CAN)	4 February 1991 (age 35)
Gillian Ellsay (CAN)	26 March 1997 (age 29)
Rotem Gafinovitz (ISR)	9 June 1992 (age 34)
Elizabeth Gin (CAN)	2 February 2001 (age 25)

Rider	Date of birth
Rachel Langdon (GBR)	25 September 1988 (age 37)
Vera Looser (NAM)	28 October 1993 (age 32)
Harriet Owen (GBR)	16 December 1993 (age 32)
Sonia Taylor (CAN)	2 June 1989 (age 37)
Gabby Traxler (CAN)	10 May 1998 (age 28)

== Major results ==
2021
UCI Track Cycling World Cup (Team Pursuit), Ngaire Barraclough

2022
Stage 4 Tour of the Gila, Maddy Ward

== National champions ==
2021
Namibia Time Trial, Vera Adrian
Namibia Road Race, Vera Adrian
Israel Time Trial, Rotem Gafinovitz
