= Team Illuminate (women's team) =

American cycling team

Team information
- UCI code: ILU
- Registered: United States
- Founded: 2017
- Status: UCI Women's Team (2017–2019); UCI Women's Continental Team (2020–present)

Key personnel
- General manager: Chris Johnson

Team name history
- 2017–: Team Illuminate

Team Illuminate is a women's professional road bicycle racing team which participates in elite women's races.

== National & Continental championships ==
2018
Oceania U23 Time Trial, Mikayla Harvey

2021
Japan Time Trial, Shoko Kashiki

2022
Japan Time Trial, Shoko Kashiki
Japan Road Race, Shoko Kashiki
