= Maria José Silva =

Nicaraguan cyclist

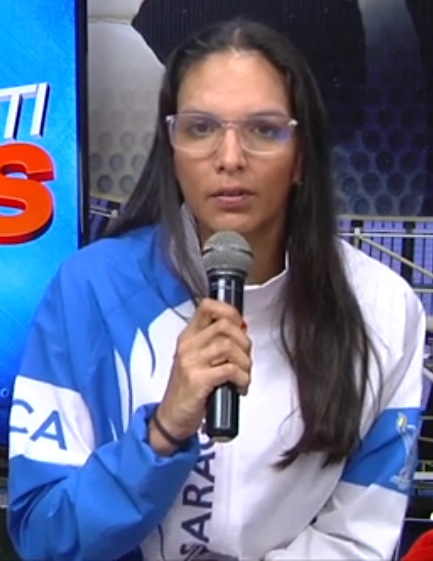
- In a 2020 interview

Personal information
- Born: 13 August 1983 (age 43)

Cycling career
- Sport: Cycling
- Role: Rider

Amateur team
- 2020: Bike Fun Run

Maria José Silva (born 13 August 1983) is a Nicaraguan professional racing cyclist and a four-time national champion.

== Major results ==
2018
National Road Championships

1st (Nicaragua) Time Trial
2nd Road Race

2019
National Road Championships

1st (Nicaragua) Time Trial
2nd Road Race

2020
National Road Championships

1st (Nicaragua) Time Trial
1st (Nicaragua) Road Race
