= Cycling at the 2013 SEA Games =

Cycling at the 2013 SEA Games took place at Mount Pleasant in Naypyidaw for BMX, mountain biking, roads of 3 towns (Leway, Pyinmanar, Tatkon) for road and Wunna Theikdi Cycling Field in Naypyidaw for Track between December 11–19.

== Medal table ==
* Host nation (Myanmar)

Rank	Nation	Gold	Silver	Bronze	Total
1	Indonesia	5	4	3	12
2	Thailand	3	6	3	12
3	Philippines	2	1	2	5
4	Vietnam	1	1	3	5
5	Laos	1	0	0	1
5	Singapore	1	0	0	1
7	Malaysia	0	1	1	2
8	Myanmar*	0	0	1	1
Totals (8 entries)		13	13	13	39

== Medalists ==
=== Road cycling ===
==== Men ====
Event	Gold	Silver	Bronze
50 km individual time trial	Mark Galedo; Philippines	Robin Manullang; Indonesia	Ronald Oranza; Philippines
100 km team time trial	Vietnam; Lê Văn Duẩn; Mai Nguyễn Hưng; Nguyễn Thành Tâm; Trịnh Đức Tâm	Thailand; Turakit Boonratanathanakorn; Navuti Liphongyu; Phuchong Saiudomsin; Sarawut Sirironnachai	Malaysia; Muhammad Fauzan Ahmad Lutfi; Muhamad Rauf Nur Misbah; Adiq Husainie Othman; Amir Mustafa Rusli
163 km road race	Ariya Phounsavath; Laos	Mai Nguyễn Hưng; Vietnam	Robin Manullang; Indonesia
163 km team road race	Indonesia; Robin Manullang; Aiman Cahyadi; Bambang Suryadi	Malaysia; Loh Sea Keong; Mohammad Saufi Mat Senan; Muhamad Rauf Nur Misbah	Philippines; Ronald Oranza; Mark Galedo; Rustom C Lim

==== Women ====
Event	Gold	Silver	Bronze
30 km individual time trial	Dinah Chan; Singapore	Chanpeng Nontasin; Thailand	Yanthi Fuciyanti; Indonesia
128 km road race	Wilaiwan Kunlapha; Thailand	Jutatip Maneephan; Thailand	Nguyễn Thị Thật; Vietnam

=== Mountain biking ===
Event	Gold	Silver	Bronze
Men's down hill	Hildan Afosma; Indonesia	Purnomo; Indonesia	Suebsakun Sukchanya; Thailand
Men's cross-country	Peerapol Chawchiangkwang; Thailand	Bandi Sugito; Indonesia	Keerati Suprasart; Thailand
Women's down hill	Vipavee Deekaballes; Thailand	Risa Suseanty; Indonesia	Sattayanun Abdulkaree; Thailand
Women's cross-country	Kusmawati Yazid; Indonesia	Jutamas Wong Padklang; Thailand	Đinh Thị Như Quỳnh; Vietnam
Mixed cross-country relay	Indonesia; Chandra Rafsanjani; Bandi Sugito; Wilhelmina Tutuarima; Kusmawati Yazid	Thailand; Peerapol Chawchiangkwang; Keerati Suprasart; Siriluck Warapiang; Jutamas Wong Padklang	Vietnam; Cao Thị Cẩm Lệ; Đinh Thị Như Quỳnh; Ha The Long; Nguyễn Văn Quảng

=== BMX ===
Event	Gold	Silver	Bronze
Men	Daniel Caluag; Philippines	Christopher Caluag; Philippines	I Gusti Bagus Saputra; Indonesia
Women	Elga Kharisma Novanda; Indonesia	Duangkamon Thongmee; Thailand	Khin Myo Htet; Myanmar

== Results ==
=== Road cycling ===
==== Men's 50 km individual time trial ====
December 15

Rank	Athlete	Time
1st place, gold medalist(s)	Mark Galedo (PHI)	1:07:00.999
2nd place, silver medalist(s)	Robin Manullang (INA)	1:07:38.294
3rd place, bronze medalist(s)	Ronald Oranza (PHI)	1:07:50.798
4	Ryan Ariehaan Hilmant (INA)	1:08:22.311
5	Bui Minh Thuy (VIE)	1:08:40.602
6	Kritsada Changpad (THA)	1:09:19.218
7	Muhammad Fauzan Ahmad Lutfi (MAS)	1:09:52.260
8	Ho Jun Rong (SIN)	1:10:06.504
9	Nik Mohd Azwan Zulkifle (MAS)	1:11:19.764
10	Kyaw Tun Oo (MYA)	1:12:30.793
11	Setthawut Yordsuwan (THA)	1:13:18.246
12	Ariya Phounsavath (LAO)	1:13:24.221
13	Thet Paing Htwe (MYA)	1:18:11.632
14	Muhammad Rafiuddin Zikara (BRU)	1:18:49.679
15	Lenh Nhonh (CAM)	1:21:24.908
16	Jacinto Da Costa (TLS)	1:25:31.558
17	Ratha Keo (CAM)	1:28:28.101
-	Darren Low (SIN)	DNF

==== Men's 100 km team time trial ====
December 16

Rank	Nation	Athletes	Time	Notes
1st place, gold medalist(s)	Vietnam (VIE)	Le Van Duan; Mai Nguyen Hung; Trinh Duc Tam; Nguyen Thanh Tam	2:36:19.717	
2nd place, silver medalist(s)	Thailand (THA)	Phuchong Saiudomsin; Thurakit Boonratanathanakorn; Navuti Liphongyu; Sarawut Sirironnachai	2:38:51.446	
3rd place, bronze medalist(s)	Malaysia (MAS)	Muhammad Fauzan Ahmad Lutfi; Amir Mustafa Rusli; Muhamad Rauf Nur Misbah; Muhamad Adiq Husainie Othman	2:41:41.285	
4	Indonesia (INA)	Ryan Ariehaan Hilmant; Hari Fitrianto; Agung Ali Sahbana; Aiman Cahyadi	2:43:31.434	
5	Singapore (SIN)	Darren Low; Low Ji Wen; Ho Jun Rong; Goh Choon Huat	2:50:39.144	
6	Philippines (PHI)	Arnold R Marcelo; Alfie P Catalan; Jan Paul Morales; John Renee Mier	2:54:19.086	
7	Brunei (BRU)	Reduan Yusop; Azmi Abd Hadzid; Ahmad Rifa'ie Haji Johor; Muhammad I'maadi Abd Aziz	3:03:43.287	
8	Myanmar (MYA)	Thet Paing Htwe; Chit Ko Ko; Aung Phone; Kyaw Tun Oo	3:06:08.840	

==== Men's 163 km road race ====
December 18

In the table below, "s.t." indicates that the rider crossed the finish line in the same group as the cyclist before him, and was therefore credited with the same finishing time.

Rank	Athlete	Time
1st place, gold medalist(s)	Ariya Phounsavath (LAO)	4:27:22
2nd place, silver medalist(s)	Mai Nguyen Hung (VIE)	4:29:07
3rd place, bronze medalist(s)	Robin Manullang (INA)	4:29:26
4	Loh Sea Keong (MAS)	4:29:51
5	Aiman Cahyadi (INA)	4:31:30
6	Sarawut Sirironnachai (THA)	4:31:45
7	Navuti Liphongyu (THA)	4:31:47
8	Trinh Duc Tam (VIE)	4:31:51
9	Bambang Suryadi (INA)	4:33:37
10	Mohammad Saufi Mat Senan (MAS)	s.t.
11	Muhamad Rauf Nur Misbah (MAS)	s.t.
12	Ronald Oranza (PHI)	s.t.
13	Mark Galedo (PHI)	s.t.
14	Rustom C Lim (PHI)	4:33:50
15	Boots Ryan B Cayubit (PHI)	4:35:06
16	Mohd Shahrul Mat Amin (MAS)	s.t.
17	Jun Rey Navarra (PHI)	4:42:17
18	Le Van Duan (VIE)	4:44:48
19	Nguyen Thanh Tam (VIE)	s.t.
20	Phuchong Saiudomsin (THA)	s.t.
21	Agung Ali Sahbana (INA)	s.t.
22	Low Ji Wen (SIN)	s.t.
23	Jan Paul Morales (PHI)	s.t.
24	Goh Choon Huat (SIN)	s.t.
25	Thurakit Boonratanathanakorn (THA)	4:44:51
26	Aung Phone (MYA)	s.t.
27	Hari Fitrianto (INA)	s.t.
28	Ryan Ariehaan Hilmant (INA)	s.t.
29	Ho Jun Rong (SIN)	4:44:55
30	Amir Mustafa Rusli (MAS)	4:44:57
31	Chit Ko Ko (MYA)	4:45:36
32	Kyaw Tun Oo (MYA)	4:45:55
33	Setthawut Yordsuwan (THA)	4:53:04
34	Ahmad Rifa'ie Haji Johor (BRU)	s.t.
35	Reduan Yusop (BRU)	s.t.
36	Kritsada Changpad (THA)	s.t.
37	Bui Minh Thuy (VIE)	s.t.
38	Nguyen Tan Hoai (VIE)	s.t.
39	Muhammad I'maadi Abd Aziz (BRU)	s.t.
40	Muhamad Adiq Husainie Othman (MAS)	s.t.
-	Azmi Abd Hadzid (BRU)	DNF
-	Jacinto Da Costa (TLS)	DNF
-	Myo Thi Ha (MYA)	DNF
-	Kerngchai Phatoumphanh (LAO)	DNF
-	Sai Aung Kham (MYA)	DNF
-	Ounheuan Thepvongsa (LAO)	DNF
-	Thet Paing Htwe (MYA)	DNF
-	Muhammad Rafiuddin Zikara (BRU)	DNF
-	Darren Low (SIN)	DNS

==== Men's 163 km team road race ====
December 18

Rank	Nation	Athletes	Time	Notes
1st place, gold medalist(s)	Indonesia (INA)	Aiman Cahyadi; Robin Manullang; Bambang Suryadi	13:34:33	
2nd place, silver medalist(s)	Malaysia (MAS)	Loh Sea Keong; Mohammad Saufi Mat Senan; Muhamad Rauf Nur Misbah	13:37:05	
3rd place, bronze medalist(s)	Philippines (PHI)	Mark Galedo; Rustom C Lim; Ronald Oranza	13:41:04	
4	Vietnam (VIE)	Le Van Duan; Mai Nguyen Hung; Trinh Duc Tam	13:45:46	
5	Thailand (THA)	Navuti Liphongyu; Phuchong Saiudomsin; Sarawut Sirironnachai	13:48:20	
6	Singapore (SIN)	Goh Choon Huat; Ho Jun Rong; Low Ji Wen	14:14:31	
7	Myanmar (MYA)	Aung Phone; Chit Ko Ko; Kyaw Tun Oo	14:16:22	
8	Brunei (BRU)	Muhammad I'maadi Abd Aziz; Ahmad Rifa'ie Haji Johor; Reduan Yusop	14:39:12	

==== Women's 30 km individual time trial ====
December 15

Rank	Athlete	Time
1st place, gold medalist(s)	Dinah Chan Siew Kheng (SIN)	46:30.125
2nd place, silver medalist(s)	Chanpeng Nontasin (THA)	47:03.765
3rd place, bronze medalist(s)	Yanthi Fuchianty (INA)	47:13.506
4	Nguyen Thuy Dung (VIE)	47:34.635
5	Supuksorn Nuntana (THA)	48:23.554
6	Grace Phang Ching Zen (MAS)	49:14.338
7	Nguyen Thi Thanh (VIE)	49:29.735
8	Mariana Mohammad (MAS)	49:31.179
9	Mu Mu Aye (MYA)	50:51.266
10	Naing Kake Khane (MYA)	51:05.710
11	Francelina Marques Cabral (TLS)	1:01:15.866

==== Women's 128 km road race ====
December 17

In the table below, "s.t." indicates that the rider crossed the finish line in the same group as the cyclist before her, and was therefore credited with the same finishing time.

Rank	Athlete	Time
1st place, gold medalist(s)	Wilaiwan Kunlapha (THA)	4:11:17
2nd place, silver medalist(s)	Jutatip Maneephan (THA)	4:15:07
3rd place, bronze medalist(s)	Nguyen Thi That (VIE)	s.t.
4	Panwaraporn Boonsawat (THA)	s.t.
5	Yanthi Fuchianty (INA)	s.t.
6	Nguyen Phan Ngoc Trang (VIE)	s.t.
7	Masziyaton Mohd Radzi (MAS)	s.t.
8	Naing Kake Khane (MYA)	4:15:14
9	Chanpeng Nontasin (THA)	4:15:17
10	Phan Thi Lieu (VIE)	4:29:56
11	Fitriani Fitriani (INA)	4:32:07
12	Mu Mu Aye (MYA)	4:37:02
13	Nur Syazwana Mohd Jamil (MAS)	s.t.
14	Azizah Farchana (INA)	4:37:59
-	Nguyen Thuy Dung (VIE)	DNF
-	Francelina Marques Cabral (TLS)	DNF
-	Naw Htee Mu (MYA)	DNF
-	Nurul Suhada Zainal (MAS)	DNF
-	Mariana Mohammad (MAS)	DNF
-	Septianis Ratna Dewi (INA)	DNF
-	Dinah Chan Siew Kheng (SIN)	DNS

=== Mountain biking ===
==== Men's down hill ====
===== Timed Run =====
December 13

Rank	Athlete	Time
1	Purnomo (INA)	2:23.035
2	Hildan Afosma (INA)	2:24.192
3	Suebsakun Sukchanya (THA)	2:25.730
4	Khuanchai Thankratok (THA)	2:28.556
5	Tan Hong Chun (SIN)	2:28.726
6	Htet Myat Aung (MYA)	2:32.199
7	Norshahriel Haizat Ahmad Nazali (MAS)	2:32.310
8	Joey U Barba (PHI)	2:33.150
9	Muhammad Arif Jamaludin (MAS)	2:35.918
10	Soe Thant (MYA)	2:38.697
11	Ha The Long (VIE)	2:46.513

===== Final =====
December 14

Rank	Athlete	Time
1st place, gold medalist(s)	Hildan Afosma (INA)	2:22.324
2nd place, silver medalist(s)	Purnomo (INA)	2:22.999
3rd place, bronze medalist(s)	Suebsakun Sukchanya (THA)	2:24.125
4	Khuanchai Thankratok (THA)	2:28.037
5	Tan Hong Chun (SIN)	2:28.980
6	Joey U Barba (PHI)	2:29.505
7	Norshahriel Haizat Ahmad Nazali (MAS)	2:30.343
8	Muhammad Arif Jamaludin (MAS)	2:34.746
9	Htet Myat Aung (MYA)	2:39.858
10	Ha The Long (VIE)	2:42.099
-	Soe Thant (MYA)	DNF

==== Men's cross-country ====
December 13

Legend

- DNFn Did not finish (abandoned in lap n)
- -n Lap Lapped with n laps remaining

Rank	Athlete	Time
1st place, gold medalist(s)	Peerapol Chawchiangkwang (THA)	1:33:20
2nd place, silver medalist(s)	Bandi Sugito (INA)	1:33:51
3rd place, bronze medalist(s)	Keerati Suprasart (THA)	1:34:13
4	Chandra Rafsanzani (INA)	1:34:47
5	Natawat Supachiwakun (THA)	1:37:38
6	Tawatchai Jeeradechatam (THA)	1:38:10
7	Nino Surban (PHI)	1:38:16
8	Alvin A Benosa (PHI)	1:40:02
9	Dadi Nurcahyadi (INA)	1:41:00
10	Eusebio Quinones (PHI)	1:43:01
11	March Mc Quinn Aleonar (PHI)	1:44:03
12	Sai Aung Khan (MYA)	1:44:13
13	Aung Phong (MYA)	1:45:05
14	Shahrin Amir (MAS)	-1 LAP
15	Nguyen Van Quang (VIE)	-1 LAP
16	Lenh Nhonh (CAM)	-1 LAP
17	Mohd Zulhafiz Saipuddin (MAS)	-2 LAP
18	Ha The Long (VIE)	-2 LAP
19	Dang Thanh Thai (VIE)	-2 LAP
20	Muhammad I'Maadi Abd Aziz (BRU)	-3 LAP
21	Zin Min Oo (MYA)	-3 LAP
22	Muhammad Rafiuddin Zikara (BRU)	-3 LAP
23	Jacinto Da Costa (TLS)	-3 LAP
24	Ratha Keo (CAM)	-3 LAP
-	Zaw Zaw Tun (MYA)	DNF5
-	Phan Hoang Hung (VIE)	DNF3
-	Norshahriel Haizat Ahmad Nazali (MAS)	DNF1

==== Women's down hill ====
===== Timed Run =====
December 13

Rank	Athlete	Time
1	Vipavee Deekaballes (THA)	2:40.826
2	Risa Suseanty (INA)	2:41.355
3	Sattayanun Abdulkaree (THA)	2:48.803
4	Quang Thi Soan (VIE)	2:58.669
5	Thu Zar (MYA)	2:58.763
6	Fitriyanti Riyani (INA)	2:58.886
7	Aye Myat Thandar Khaing (MYA)	5:48.311
-	Thin Yanant Aung (MYA)	DNS

===== Final =====
December 14

Rank	Athlete	Time
1st place, gold medalist(s)	Vipavee Deekaballes (THA)	2:37.191
2nd place, silver medalist(s)	Risa Suseanty (INA)	2:38.707
3rd place, bronze medalist(s)	Sattayanun Abdulkaree (THA)	2:42.635
4	Thu Zar (MYA)	2:49.659
5	Quang Thi Soan (VIE)	2:51.160
6	Fitriyanti Riyani (INA)	2:56.372
7	Aye Myat Thandar Khaing (MYA)	3:01.400

==== Women's cross-country ====
December 13

Legend

- DNFn Did not finish (abandoned in lap n)
- -n Lap Lapped with n laps remaining

Rank	Athlete	Time
1st place, gold medalist(s)	Kusmawati Yazid (INA)	1:21:20
2nd place, silver medalist(s)	Jutamas Wong Padklang (THA)	1:21:43
3rd place, bronze medalist(s)	Dinh Thi Nhu Quynh (VIE)	1:21:54
4	Cao Thi Cam Le (VIE)	1:23:58
5	Masziyaton Mohd Radzi (MAS)	1:25:18
6	Siriluck Warapiang (THA)	1:26:09
7	Junaidah Juss (MAS)	1:26:21
8	Nunung Sekar Ningsih (INA)	1:27:36
9	Tin Win Kyi (MYA)	1:30:53
10	Sirikwan Hangpai (THA)	1:32:09
11	Quang Thi Soan (VIE)	1:34:59
12	Siv Lang Heng (CAM)	1:35:11
13	Zin Mar Oo (MYA)	1:35:57
14	Wilhelmina Tutuarima (INA)	1:36:04
15	Siv Guex Heng (CAM)	-2 LAP
16	Francelina Marques Cabral (TLS)	-2 LAP
-	Thin Yanant Aung (MYA)	DNF1

==== Mixed cross-country relay ====
December 12

Rank	Nation	Athletes	Time	Notes
1st place, gold medalist(s)	Indonesia (INA)	Kusmawati Yazid; Chandra Rafsanzani; Wilhelmina Tutuarima; Bandi Sugito	55:48.377	
2nd place, silver medalist(s)	Thailand (THA)	Keerati Suprasart; Jutamas Wong Padklang; Siriluck Warapiang; Peerapol Chawchiangkwang	57:23.117	
3rd place, bronze medalist(s)	Vietnam (VIE)	Ha The Long; Nguyen Van Quang; Cao Thi Cam Le; Dinh Thi Nhu Quynh	58:59.362	
4	Malaysia (MAS)	Junaidah Juss; Mohd Zulhafiz Saipuddin; Masziyaton Mohd Radzi; Shahrin Amir	59:40.412	
5	Myanmar (MYA)	Aung Phong; Zin Mar Oo; Sai Aung Khan; Tin Win Kyi	1:00:33.868	
6	Cambodia (CAM)	Lenh Nhonh; Ratha Keo; Siv Lang Heng; Siv Guex Heng	1:10:26.847	

=== BMX ===
==== Men ====
December 19

===== Seeding run =====
Rank	Athlete	Time
1	Daniel Patrick M Caluag (PHI)	33.097
2	Toni Syarifudin (INA)	34.208
3	Christopher John M Caluag (PHI)	34.383
4	Jukrapech Wichana (THA)	34.462
5	I Gusti Bagus Saputra (INA)	34.762
6	Hlaing Myo Tun (MYA)	35.596
7	Muhammad Elmi Jumari (MAS)	37.059
8	Muhammad Arif Jamaludin (MAS)	40.359
9	Panyapon Sornkla (THA)	43.097
10	Thura Zaw (MYA)	59.478

===== Qualifying =====
====== Heat 1 ======
Rank	Name	1st run	2nd run	3rd run	Total	Notes
1	Daniel Patrick M Caluag (PHI)	32.784 (1)	33.032 (1)	32.684 (1)	3	Q
2	I Gusti Bagus Saputra (INA)	41.090 (5)	33.986 (2)	33.223 (2)	9	Q
3	Jukrapech Wichana (THA)	33.890 (2)	34.882 (4)	33.797 (3)	9	Q
4	Panyapon Sornkla (THA)	34.343 (3)	34.350 (3)	35.040 (4)	10	Q
5	Muhammad Arif Jamaludin (MAS)	38.912 (4)	40.414 (5)	39.220 (5)	14	

====== Heat 2 ======
Rank	Name	1st run	2nd run	3rd run	Total	Notes
1	Christopher John M Caluag (PHI)	33.677 (1)	33.150 (1)	33.019 (1)	3	Q
2	Toni Syarifudin (INA)	34.438 (2)	33.743 (2)	33.160 (2)	6	Q
3	Hlaing Myo Tun (MYA)	34.784 (3)	35.246 (3)	35.233 (3)	9	Q
4	Thura Zaw (MYA)	36.119 (4)	35.992 (4)	36.337 (5)	13	Q
5	Muhammad Elmi Jumari (MAS)	36.381 (5)	36.131 (5)	36.271 (4)	14	

===== Final =====
Rank	Athlete	Time
1st place, gold medalist(s)	Daniel Patrick M Caluag (PHI)	31.994
2nd place, silver medalist(s)	Christopher John M Caluag (PHI)	32.555
3rd place, bronze medalist(s)	I Gusti Bagus Saputra (INA)	32.825
4	Jukrapech Wichana (THA)	33.912
5	Panyapon Sornkla (THA)	34.847
6	Hlaing Myo Tun (MYA)	35.623
7	Toni Syarifudin (INA)	36.439
8	Thura Zaw (MYA)	36.529

==== Women ====
===== Seeding run =====
Rank	Athlete	Time
1	Elga Kharisma Novanda (INA)	36.898
2	Nicha Prasoetsri (THA)	37.592
3	Duangkamon Thongmee (THA)	38.302
4	Khaing Zin Moe (MYA)	38.667
5	Suswanti (INA)	39.389
6	Khin Myo Htet (MYA)	40.416
7	Dang Thi Ngoc Huyen (VIE)	47.106

===== Final =====
Rank	Name	1st run	2nd run	3rd run	Total	Notes
1st place, gold medalist(s)	Elga Kharisma Novanda (INA)	36.981 (1)	37.211 (1)	37.105 (1)	3	
2nd place, silver medalist(s)	Duangkamon Thongmee (THA)	39.647 (3)	38.245 (3)	37.621 (2)	8	
3rd place, bronze medalist(s)	Khin Myo Htet (MYA)	39.030 (2)	38.677 (4)	40.349 (4)	10	
4	Nicha Prasoetsri (THA)	50.718 (6)	37.576 (2)	38.783 (3)	11	
5	Khaing Zin Moe (MYA)	46.203 (4)	39.360 (5)	48.270 (6)	15	
6	Dang Thi Ngoc Huyen (VIE)	47.082 (5)	46.752 (6)	46.849 (5)	16	
7	Suswanti (INA)	DNF (7)	DNS (9)	DNS (9)	25	

Preceded by 2011	Cycling at the SEA Games; 2013 SEA Games	Succeeded by 2015
