= Cycling at the 2018 Asian Games – Men's BMX racing =

Men's racing at the 2018 Asian Games
- Venue: Pulomas International BMX Center
- Date: 25 August 2018
- Competitors: 12 from 6 nations

Medalists
gold medal	Yoshitaku Nagasako	Japan
silver medal	I Gusti Bagus Saputra	Indonesia
bronze medal	Daniel Caluag	Philippines

The men's BMX racing competition at the 2018 Asian Games in Jakarta was held on 25 August at the Pulomas International BMX Center.

== Schedule ==
All times are Western Indonesia Time (UTC+07:00)

Date	Time	Event
Saturday, 25 August 2018	09:25	Seeding run
Saturday, 25 August 2018	10:06	Motos
Saturday, 25 August 2018	11:25	Final

== Results ==
=== Seeding run ===
Rank	Athlete	Time
1	Yoshitaku Nagasako (JPN)	35.22
2	Sittichok Kaewsrikhao (THA)	35.63
3	I Gusti Bagus Saputra (INA)	35.81
4	Toni Syarifudin (INA)	35.94
5	Daniel Caluag (PHI)	36.22
6	Jukia Yoshimura (JPN)	36.53
7	Li Xiaogang (CHN)	37.21
8	Sun Yue (CHN)	37.29
9	Nonthakon Inkhoksong (THA)	37.36
10	Christopher Caluag (PHI)	37.41
11	Kim Beom-jung (KOR)	38.35
12	Cha Seung-ho (KOR)	43.80

=== Motos ===
==== Heat 1 ====
Rank	Athlete	Run 1		Run 2		Run 3		Total
Rank	Athlete	Time	Pts	Time	Pts	Time	Pts	Total
1	Yoshitaku Nagasako (JPN)	34.392	2	34.702	1	34.555	1	4
2	Daniel Caluag (PHI)	35.191	3	36.007	3	35.150	2	8
3	Toni Syarifudin (INA)	34.147	1	35.383	2	39.282	5	8
4	Sun Yue (CHN)	35.971	4	36.227	4	36.033	4	12
5	Nonthakon Inkhoksong (THA)	36.325	5	36.538	5	35.776	3	13
6	Cha Seung-ho (KOR)	43.665	6	43.892	6	44.117	6	18

==== Heat 2 ====
Rank	Athlete	Run 1		Run 2		Run 3		Total
Rank	Athlete	Time	Pts	Time	Pts	Time	Pts	Total
1	Jukia Yoshimura (JPN)	34.871	1	34.904	1	35.217	1	3
2	I Gusti Bagus Saputra (INA)	35.168	2	35.421	2	35.451	2	6
3	Sittichok Kaewsrikhao (THA)	35.678	3	35.876	4	35.737	3	10
4	Li Xiaogang (CHN)	37.375	6	35.801	3	36.155	4	13
5	Christopher Caluag (PHI)	36.056	4	35.993	5	36.299	5	14
6	Kim Beom-jung (KOR)	36.313	5	37.722	6	39.139	6	17

=== Final ===
Rank	Athlete	Time
1st place, gold medalist(s)	Yoshitaku Nagasako (JPN)	33.669
2nd place, silver medalist(s)	I Gusti Bagus Saputra (INA)	34.314
3rd place, bronze medalist(s)	Daniel Caluag (PHI)	35.842
4	Sun Yue (CHN)	36.094
5	Toni Syarifudin (INA)	36.761
6	Jukia Yoshimura (JPN)	38.334
7	Sittichok Kaewsrikhao (THA)	40.094
8	Li Xiaogang (CHN)	43.752
