= Cycling at the 2014 Asian Games – Men's BMX racing =

Men's racing at the 2010 Asian Games
- Venue: Ganghwa Asiad BMX Track
- Date: 1 October 2014
- Competitors: 8 from 5 nations

Medalists
gold medal	Daniel Caluag	Philippines
silver medal	Masahiro Sampei	Japan
bronze medal	Zhu Yan	China

The men's BMX racing competition at the 2014 Asian Games in Incheon was held on 1 October 2014 at the Ganghwa Asiad BMX Track.

== Schedule ==
All times are Korea Standard Time (UTC+09:00)

Date	Time	Event
Wednesday, 1 October 2014	11:30	Seeding run
Wednesday, 1 October 2014	13:10	Motos

== Results ==
=== Seeding run ===
Rank	Athlete	Time
1	Daniel Caluag (PHI)	35.489
2	Masahiro Sampei (JPN)	36.286
3	Kim Young (KOR)	36.399
4	Zhu Yan (CHN)	36.668
5	Zhao Zhiyang (CHN)	36.749
6	Christopher Caluag (PHI)	37.005
7	Toni Syarifudin (INA)	37.056
8	Jegal Hyun (KOR)	37.620

=== Motos ===
Rank	Athlete	Run 1		Run 2		Run 3		Total
Rank	Athlete	Time	Pts	Time	Pts	Time	Pts	Total
1st place, gold medalist(s)	Daniel Caluag (PHI)	35.277	1	35.366	1	35.431	1	3
2nd place, silver medalist(s)	Masahiro Sampei (JPN)	35.444	2	35.486	2	36.104	3	7
3rd place, bronze medalist(s)	Zhu Yan (CHN)	37.242	5	37.072	3	35.609	2	10
4	Christopher Caluag (PHI)	36.427	3	37.633	4	37.337	5	12
5	Toni Syarifudin (INA)	36.856	4	37.835	5	36.624	4	13
6	Kim Young (KOR)	37.623	6	46.479	7	37.383	6	19
7	Zhao Zhiyang (CHN)	38.193	7	47.130	8	37.952	7	22
8	Jegal Hyun (KOR)	1:01.670	8	40.239	6	39.479	8	22
