= 2020 Women's Tour of Thailand =

2020 The Princess Maha Chackri Sirindhorn's Cup "Women's Tour of Thailand"
Race details
- Dates: 14–16 October 2020
- Stages: 3 stages

Results
Jersey awarded to the overall winner	Winner	Jutatip Maneephan (THA)	(Thailand (National Team))
	Second	Supaksorn Nuntana (THA)	(Thailand Women's Cycling Team)
	Third	Chaniporn Batriya (THA)	(Thailand Women's Cycling Team)
Jersey awarded to the points classification winner	Points	Supaksorn Nuntana (THA)	(Thailand Women's Cycling Team)
Jersey awarded to the youth classification winner	Youth	Chaniporn Batriya (THA)	(Thailand Women's Cycling Team)

The 2020 The Princess Maha Chackri Sirindhorn's Cup "Women's Tour of Thailand" is a women's cycle stage race held in Thailand from 14 to 16 October, 2020. The tour has an UCI rating of 2.2.

The race was won for the second consecutive year by Jutatip Maneephan.

== Stages ==
List of stages
Stage	Date	Course	Distance	Type	Winner	Team
1	14 October	Surat Thani to Surat Thani	82.1 km (51.0 mi)	Flat stage	Jutatip Maneephan (THA)	Thailand (National team)
2	15 October	Surat Thani to Surat Thani	98.6 km (61.3 mi)	Flat stage	Jutatip Maneephan (THA)	Thailand (National team)
3	16 October	Surat Thani to Surat Thani	81.2 km (50.5 mi)	Flat stage	Supaksorn Nuntana (THA)	Thailand Women's Cycling Team
Total			261.9 km (162.7 mi)			

== Classification leadership ==
Stage	Winner	General classification	Sprints classification	Youth classification	Best Asian rider classification
1	Jutatip Maneephan	Jutatip Maneephan	Jutatip Maneephan	Chaniporn Batriya	Jutatip Maneephan
2	Jutatip Maneephan	Jutatip Maneephan	Jutatip Maneephan	Chaniporn Batriya	Jutatip Maneephan
3	Supaksorn Nuntana	Jutatip Maneephan	Supaksorn Nuntana	Chaniporn Batriya	Jutatip Maneephan
Final		Jutatip Maneephan	Supaksorn Nuntana	Chaniporn Batriya	Jutatip Maneephan
