= Cycling at the 2026 Asian Games – Women's road race =

Women's individual road race at the 2026 Asian Games
- Venue: Shinshiro Cycling Road Course
- Date: 22 September 2026
- Competitors: 40 from 17 nations

Medalists
gold medal	Guo Li	China
silver medal	Fariba Hashimi	Afghanistan
bronze medal	Leung Wing Yee	Hong Kong

The women's 90.4 kilometres road race competition at the 2026 Asian Games took place on 22 September 2026 in Shinshiro Cycling Road Course.

== Schedule ==
All times are Japan Standard Time (UTC+09:00)

Date	Time	Event
Tuesday, 22 September 2026	09:00	Final

== Results ==
Rank	Athlete	Time
1st place, gold medalist(s)	Guo Li (CHN)	2:50:05
2nd place, silver medalist(s)	Fariba Hashimi (AFG)	2:50:05
3rd place, bronze medalist(s)	Leung Wing Yee (HKG)	2:50:46
4	Zhang Hao (CHN)	2:51:31
5	Akari Kobayashi (JPN)	2:52:16
6	Yanina Kuskova (UZB)	2:52:21
7	Jang Su-ji (KOR)	2:52:21
8	Rinata Sultanova (KAZ)	2:52:41
9	Chaniporn Batriya (THA)	2:53:57
10	Shakhnoza Abdullaeva (UZB)	2:53:57
11	Nafosat Kozieva (UZB)	2:54:48
12	Dewika Mulya Sova (INA)	2:54:48
13	Yurina Kinoshita (JPN)	2:54:48
14	Mandana Dehghan Manshadi (IRI)	2:55:24
15	Yelizaveta Sklyarova (KAZ)	2:55:52
16	Lee Ju-mi (KOR)	2:55.52
17	Enkhjin Gantogtokh (MGL)	2:55:52
18	Ayustina Delia Priatna (INA)	2:56:10
19	Kasuga Watabe (JPN)	2:56:10
20	Safia Al-Sayegh (UAE)	2:56:10
21	Nguyễn Thị Thu Mai (VIE)	2:56:10
22	Elizabeth Liau (SGP)	2:56:53
23	Violetta Kazakova (KAZ)	2:58:00
24	Phetdarin Somrat (THA)	2:59:49
25	Kwan Tsz Kwan (HKG)	3:00:50
26	Nguyễn Thị Thi (VIE)	3:00:52
27	Nguyễn Thị That (VIE)	3:00:52
28	Andini Putri Anastasya (INA)	3:02:00
29	Yulduz Hashimi (AFG)	3:02:07
30	Zhou Qiuying (CHN)	3:02:26
31	Cheung Li Tong (HKG)	3:03:23
	Chan Chi Ian (MAC)	OTL
	Solongo Tserenlkham (MGL)	OTL
	Zahra Rezayee (AFG)	OTL
	Zeng Ke-xin (TPE)	OTL
	Lee Jue-un (KOR)	DNF
	Kamonrada Khaoplot (THA)	DNF
	Zahra Hussain (UAE)	DNF
	Samah Khaled (JOR)	DNF
	Au Hoi Ian (MAC)	DNF
