= 2018 The Princess Maha Chackri Sirindhorn's Cup "Women's Tour of Thailand" =

2018 The Princess Maha Chackri Sirindhorn's Cup
Race details
- Dates: 8–10 April 2018
- Stages: 4 (including 1 split-stage)
- Distance: 288.1 km (179.0 mi)

Results
Jersey awarded to the overall winner	Winner	Olga Zabelinskaya (RUS)	(Russia (national team))
	Second	Karina Kasenova (RUS)	(Russia (national team))
	Third	Gulnaz Badykova (RUS)	(Russia (national team))
Jersey awarded to the points classification winner	Points	Jutatip Maneephan (THA)	(Thailand (national team))
	Team	Russia (national team)	

The 2018 The Princess Maha Chackri Sirindhorn's Cup is a women's cycle stage race that is being held in Thailand from 8 to 10 April 2018. The 2018 edition of the race was the seventh running of The Princess Maha Chackri Sirindhon's Cup, being held with a UCI rating of 2.1.

== Teams ==
UCI Women's Teams

- Hitec Products–Birk Sport
- Team Illuminate
- Thailand Women's Cycling Team

National teams

- Hong Kong
- Japan
- Kazakhstan
- Malaysia
- Philippines
- Russia
- Singapore
- Thailand
- Vietnam

Other teams

- Fisherman's Friend Chiang Mai
- Maaslandster International
- World Cycling Center

== Route ==
Stage schedule
Stage	Date	Route	Distance	Type	Winner
1a	8 April	Phutthamonthon Isan to Phutthamonthon Isan	20 km (12.4 mi)	Team time trial	Russia (national team)
1b	8 April	Phutthamonthon Isan to Bung Kaen Nakhon	42.1 km (26.2 mi)	Flat stage	Jutatip Maneephan (THA)
2	9 April	Bung Kaen Nakhon to Baan Fang	113 km (70.2 mi)	Flat stage	Thi That Nguyen (VIE)
3	10 April	Bung Kaen Nakhon to Bung Kaen Nakhon	113 km (70.2 mi)	Flat stage	Jutatip Maneephan (THA)

== Classification leadership table ==
Stage	Winner	General classification	Points classification	Team classification
1a	Russia (national team)	Olga Zabelinskaya	Not awarded	Russia (national team)
1b	Jutatip Maneephan	Olga Zabelinskaya	Jutatip Maneephan	Russia (national team)
2	Thi That Nguyen	Olga Zabelinskaya	Nina Kessler	Russia (national team)
3	Jutatip Maneephan	Olga Zabelinskaya	Jutatip Maneephan	Russia (national team)
Final		Olga Zabelinskaya	Jutatip Maneephan	Russia (national team)

== See also ==
- 2018 in women's road cycling
