= Tour of Thailand =

Thai multi-day road cycling race

Race details
- Date: April
- Region: Thailand
- Local name: ทัวร์ ออฟ ไทยแลนด์ (in Thai)
- Discipline: Road
- Competition: UCI Asia Tour 2.1
- Type: Stage race
- Organiser: Thai Cycling Association
- Web site: tourofthailand.in.th

History (men)
- First edition: 2006
- Editions: 21 (as of 2026)
- First winner: Li Fuyu (CHN)
- Most wins: Yasuharu Nakajima (JPN) (2 wins)
- Most recent: Vadim Pronskiy (KAZ)

History (women)
- First edition: 2012
- Editions: 13 (as of 2024)
- First winner: Liu Xin (CHN)
- Most wins: Jutatip Maneephan (THA) (4 wins)
- Most recent: Jutatip Maneephan (THA)

The Tour of Thailand, officially the Princess Maha Chakri Sirindhon's Cup Tour of Thailand is an annual professional road bicycle racing stage race held in Thailand. It was classified by the International Cycling Union as a 2.2 category race as part of the UCI Asia Tour, becoming rated category 2.1 since 2017.

== Past winners ==
=== Men's race ===
Year	Country	Rider	Team
2006	China	Li Fuyu	Marco Polo
2007	Iran	Ahad Kazemi	Tabriz Petrochemical Team
2008	Great Britain	Alex Coutts	Giant Asia Racing Team
2009	United States	Andrew Bajadali	Kelly Benefit Strategies
2010	United States	Kiel Reijnen	Giant Asia Racing Team
2011	Germany	Tobias Erler	Tabriz Petrochemical Team
2012	Australia	Mitchell Lovelock-Fay	Australia national team
2013	Hong Kong	Choi Ki Ho	Hong Kong national team
2014	Japan	Yasuharu Nakajima	Aisan Racing Team
2015	Japan	Yasuharu Nakajima	Aisan Racing Team
2016	Australia	Benjamin Hill	Attaque Team Gusto
2017	Kazakhstan	Yevgeniy Gidich	Vino–Astana Motors
2018	Australia	Ben Dyball	St George Continental Cycling Team
2019	Australia	Ryan Cavanagh	St George Continental Cycling Team
2020	Germany	Nikodemus Holler	Bike Aid
2021	Mongolia	Jambaljamts Sainbayar	Terengganu Cycling Team
2022	Poland	Alan Banaszek	HRE Mazowsze Serce Polski
2023	Mongolia	Batsaikhany Tegshbayar	Roojai Online Insurance
2024	Netherlands	Adne van Engelen	Roojai Insurance
2025	Denmark	Alexander Salby	Li-Ning Star
2026	Kazakhstan	Vadim Pronskiy	Terengganu Cycling Team

=== Women's race ===
Year	Winner	Second	Third
2012	Liu Xin (CHN)	Mayuko Hagiwara (JPN)	Sun-ae Choi (KOR)
2013	Dung Nguyễn Thùy (VNM)	Huang Ting-ying (TWN)	Kunlapha Wilaiwan (THA)
2014	Meng Zhaojuan (HKG)	Jutatip Maneephan (THA)	Hsiao Mei-yu (TWN)
2015	Meng Zhaojuan (HKG)	Lauren Kitchen (AUS)	Nguyễn Thị Thật (VNM)
2016	Yang Qianyu (HKG)	Huang Ting-ying (TWN)	Nguyễn Thị Thật (VNM)
2017	Phetdarin Somrat (THA)	Nguyễn Thị Thật (VNM)	Miriam Bjørnsrud (NOR)
2018	Olga Zabelinskaya (RUS)	Karina Kasenova (RUS)	Gulnaz Badykova (RUS)
2019	Jutatip Maneephan (THA)	Teniel Campbell (TRI)	Yumi Kajihara (JPN)
2020	Jutatip Maneephan (THA)	Supaksorn Nuntana (THA)	Chaniporn Batriya (THA)
2021	Chaniporn Batriya (THA)	Satinee Juntima (THA)	Jutatip Maneephan (THA)
2022	Phetdarin Somrat (THA)	Hannah Seeliger (AUS)	Siti Nur Adibah Akma Mohd Fuad (MAS)
2023	Lee Eun-hee (KOR)	Nur Aisyah Mohamad Zubir (MAS)	Ayustina Delia Priatna (INA)
2024	Jutatip Maneephan (THA)	Nguyễn Thị Thật (VIE)	Claudia Marcks (AUS)
2025	Jutatip Maneephan (THA)	Lee Sze-wing (HKG)	Jiali Liu (CHN)
