= Cycling at the 2011 SEA Games =

== Medal summary ==
=== BMX ===
Event	Gold	Silver	Bronze
Men's cross	Buamin; Indonesia	Toni Syarifudin; Indonesia	Narong Klinsurai; Thailand
Women's cross	Elga Kharisma Novanda; Indonesia	Vipavee Deekaballes; Thailand	Suswanti; Indonesia

=== Mountain biking ===
Event	Gold	Silver	Bronze
Men's downhill 1.5 km	Purnomo; Indonesia	Joey Barba; Philippines	Tanaphon Jarupeng; Thailand
Men's cross country	Chandra Rafsanjani; Indonesia	Bandi Sugito; Indonesia	Nino Surban; Philippines
Women's downhill 1.5 km	Risa Suseanty; Indonesia	Fitriyanti Riyanti; Indonesia	Vipavee Deekaballes; Thailand
Women's cross country	Đinh Thị Như Quỳnh; Vietnam	Masziyaton Radzi; Malaysia	Kusmawati Yazid; Indonesia

=== Road cycling ===
==== Men ====
Event	Gold	Silver	Bronze
50 km individual time trial	Tonton Susanto; Indonesia	Darren Low; Singapore	Mark Galedo; Philippines
70 km team time trial	Thailand; Navuti Liphongyu; Phuchong Sai-udomsin; Sarawut Sirironnachai; Thanasak Thanchai	Indonesia; Agung Ali Sahbana; Hari Fitrianto; Robin Manullang; Ryan Ariehaan Hilman	Philippines; Mark Galedo; George Oconer; Lloyd Reynante; Ronald Gorantes
180 km road race	Hari Fitrianto; Indonesia	Mark Galedo; Philippines	Phuchong Sai-udomsin; Thailand
180 km team road race	Indonesia; Hari Fitrianto; Ryan Ariehaan Hilman; Tonton Susanto	Thailand; Phuchong Sai-udomsin; Navuti Liphongyu; Okart Bualoi; Sarawut Sirironnachai; Thanasak Thanchai	Vietnam; Mai Nguyễn Hưng; Hồ Văn Phúc; Trịnh Đức Tâm

==== Women ====
Event	Gold	Silver	Bronze
25 km individual time trial	Chanpeng Nontasin; Thailand	Yanthi Fuciyanti; Indonesia	Dinah Chan; Singapore
110 km road race	Yanthi Fuciyanti; Indonesia	Chanpeng Nontasin; Thailand	Dinah Chan; Singapore

=== Track cycling ===
==== Men ====
Event	Gold	Silver	Bronze
4 km individual pursuit	Alfie Catalan; Philippines	Projo Waseso; Indonesia	Mier Lohn Renee; Philippines
4 km team pursuit	Malaysia; Adiq Husainie Othman; Amir Mustafa Rusli; Mohammad Akmal Amrun; Harrif Salleh	Indonesia; Iwan Setiawan; Arin Iswana; Ibnu Faroka; Parno	Philippines; Jan Paul Morales; Alfie Pajo Catalan; Mier Lohn Renee; Arnold Marcelo
Sprint	Mohd Edrus Yunus; Malaysia	Mohd Fattah Amri Zaid; Malaysia	Asep Suryaman; Indonesia
10 km scratch race	Harrif Salleh; Malaysia	Satjakul Sianglam; Thailand	Jan Paul Morales; Philippines
40 km points race	Mier Lohn Renee; Philippines	Adiq Husainie Othman; Malaysia	Ibnu Faroka; Indonesia
Omnium	Mohamad Hafiz; Malaysia	Fatahillah Abdullah; Indonesia	Ahmad Fakhrullah Alias; Malaysia

==== Women ====
Event	Gold	Silver	Bronze
500 m individual time trial	Fatehah Mustapa; Malaysia	Epingger Apryl; Philippines	Uyun Muzizah; Indonesia
Sprint	Fatehah Mustapa; Malaysia	Epingger Apryl; Philippines	Santia Tri Kusuma; Indonesia
Team sprint	Malaysia; Fatehah Mustapa; Jupha Somnet	Thailand; Chanakan Srichaum; Jutatip Maneephan	Indonesia; Santia Tri Kusuma; Riska Agustin
5 km scratch race	Uyun Muzizah; Indonesia	Jutatip Maneephan; Thailand	Epingger Apryl; Philippines
20 km points race	Uyun Muzizah; Indonesia	Panwaraporn Boonsawat; Thailand	Yanthi Fuciyanti; Indonesia
Omnium	Uyun Muzizah; Indonesia	Jutatip Maneephan; Thailand	Nurhayati; Indonesia

== Medal table ==
* Host nation (Indonesia)

Rank	Nation	Gold	Silver	Bronze	Total
1	Indonesia (INA)*	12	8	9	29
2	Malaysia (MAS)	7	3	1	11
3	Thailand (THA)	2	8	4	14
4	Philippines (PHI)	2	4	7	13
5	Vietnam (VIE)	1	0	1	2
6	Singapore (SIN)	0	1	2	3
Totals (6 entries)		24	24	24	72

Preceded by 2009	Cycling at the SEA Games; 2011 SEA Games	Succeeded by 2013
