= 2015 The Princess Maha Chackri Sirindhon's Cup =

Race details
- Dates: 8–10 April
- Stages: 3
- Distance: 295.75 km (183.8 mi)
- Winning time: 8h 05' 22"

Results
Jersey awarded to the overall winner	Winner	Meng Zhaojuan (HKG)	(China Chongming–Liv–Champion System)
	Second	Lauren Kitchen (AUS)	(Team Hitec Products)
	Third	Nguyễn Thị Thật (VNM)	(Vietnam (national team))
Jersey awarded to the points classification winner	Points	Meng Zhaojuan (HKG)	(China Chongming–Liv–Champion System)
	Team	Thailand (national team)	

The 2015 The Princess Maha Chackri Sirindhon's Cup was a stage race held in Thailand, with a UCI rating of 2.2, from 8 April to 10 April 2015. The race was won by Hong Kong's Meng Zhaojuan.

== Stages ==
=== Stage 1 ===
8 April 2015 – Udon Thani to Nong Khai, 79.9 km (49.6 mi)

Stage 1 result
Rank	Rider	Team	Time
1	Nguyễn Thị Thật (VNM)	Vietnam (national team)	2h 35' 13"
2	Meng Zhaojuan (HKG)	China Chongming–Liv–Champion System	+ 0"
3	Huang Ting-ying (TWN)	Taiwan (national team)	+ 0"
4	Hsiao Mei-yu (TWN)	Taiwan (national team)	+ 0"
5	Cecilie Gotaas Johnsen (NOR)	Team Hitec Products	+ 0"
6	Miho Yoshikawa (JPN)	Asahi Team	+ 0"
7	Panawaraporn Boonsawat (THA)	Thailand (national team)	+ 0"
8	Luo Xiaoling (CHN)	China Chongming–Liv–Champion System	+ 0"
9	Nguyễn Thùy Dung (VNM)	Vietnam (national team)	+ 0"
10	Pang Yao (HKG)	Hong Kong Cycling Association	+ 0"

General classification after Stage 1
Rank	Rider	Team	Time
1	Nguyễn Thị Thật (VNM)	Vietnam (national team)	2h 35' 01"
2	Huang Ting-ying (TWN)	Taiwan (national team)	+ 5"
3	Meng Zhaojuan (HKG)	China Chongming–Liv–Champion System	+ 6"
4	Panawaraporn Boonsawat (THA)	Thailand (national team)	+ 11"
5	Hsiao Mei-yu (TWN)	Taiwan (national team)	+ 12"
6	Cecilie Gotaas Johnsen (NOR)	Team Hitec Products	+ 12"
7	Miho Yoshikawa (JPN)	Asahi Team	+ 12"
8	Luo Xiaoling (CHN)	China Chongming–Liv–Champion System	+ 12"
9	Nguyễn Thùy Dung (VNM)	Vietnam (national team)	+ 12"
10	Pang Yao (HKG)	Hong Kong (national team)	+ 12"

=== Stage 2 ===
9 April 2015 – Nong Khai to Nong Khai, 128.35 km (79.8 mi)

Stage 2 result
Rank	Rider	Team	Time
1	Lauren Kitchen (AUS)	Team Hitec Products	3h 13' 10"
2	Huang Ting-ying (TWN)	Taiwan (national team)	+ 2"
3	Miho Yoshikawa (JPN)	Asahi Team	+ 2"
4	Nguyễn Thị Thật (VNM)	Vietnam (national team)	+ 2"
5	Panawaraporn Boonsawat (THA)	Thailand (national team)	+ 2"
6	Luo Xiaoling (CHN)	China Chongming–Liv–Champion System	+ 2"
7	Kiyoka Sakaguchi (JPN)	Japan (national team)	+ 2"
8	Meng Zhaojuan (HKG)	China Chongming–Liv–Champion System	+ 2"
9	Diao Xiaojuan (HKG)	Hong Kong (national team)	+ 2"
10	Jutatip Maneephan (THA)	Thailand (national team)	+ 2"

General classification after Stage 2
Rank	Rider	Team	Time
1	Lauren Kitchen (AUS)	Team Hitec Products	5h 48' 08"
2	Huang Ting-ying (TWN)	Taiwan (national team)	+ 4"
3	Nguyễn Thị Thật (VNM)	Vietnam (national team)	+ 4"
4	Meng Zhaojuan (HKG)	China Chongming–Liv–Champion System	+ 9"
5	Miho Yoshikawa (JPN)	Asahi Team	+ 13"
6	Panawaraporn Boonsawat (THA)	Thailand (national team)	+ 14"
7	Phetdarin Somrat (THA)		+ 16"
8	Cecilie Gotaas Johnsen (NOR)	Team Hitec Products	+ 16"
9	Luo Xiaoling (CHN)	China Chongming–Liv–Champion System	+ 17"
10	Hsiao Mei-yu (TWN)	Taiwan (national team)	+ 17"

=== Stage 3 ===
10 April 2015 – Nong Khai to Udon Thani, 87.5 km (54.4 mi)

Stage 3 result
Rank	Rider	Team	Time
1	Meng Zhaojuan (HKG)	China Chongming–Liv–Champion System	2h 17' 18"
2	Miho Yoshikawa (JPN)	Asahi Team	+ 0"
3	Jutatip Maneephan (THA)	Thailand (national team)	+ 0"
4	Panawaraporn Boonsawat (THA)	Thailand (national team)	+ 0"
5	Supaksorn Nuntana (THA)	Thailand (national team)	+ 0"
6	Lauren Kitchen (AUS)	Team Hitec Products	+ 0"
7	Rachana Azizah (INA)	Costums Cycling Club	+ 0"
8	Luo Xiaoling (CHN)	China Chongming–Liv–Champion System	+ 0"
9	Diao Xiaojuan (HKG)	Hong Kong (national team)	+ 0"
10	Huang Ting-ying (TWN)	Taiwan (national team)	+ 0"

Final general classification
Rank	Rider	Team	Time
1	Meng Zhaojuan (HKG)	China Chongming–Liv–Champion System	8h 05' 22"
2	Lauren Kitchen (AUS)	Team Hitec Products	+ 4"
3	Nguyễn Thị Thật (VNM)	Vietnam (national team)	+ 6"
4	Huang Ting-ying (TWN)	Taiwan (national team)	+ 8"
5	Miho Yoshikawa (JPN)	Asahi Team	+ 11"
6	Jutatip Maneephan (THA)	Thailand (national team)	+ 17"
7	Phetdarin Somrat (THA)		+ 18"
8	Panawaraporn Boonsawat (THA)	Thailand (national team)	+ 20"
9	Luo Xiaoling (CHN)	China Chongming–Liv–Champion System	+ 20"
10	Cecilie Gotaas Johnsen (NOR)	Team Hitec Products	+ 20"

== Classification leadership table ==
Stage	Winner	General classification	Points classification	Team classification
1	Nguyễn Thị Thật	Nguyễn Thị Thật	Nguyễn Thị Thật	Vietnam (national team)
2	Lauren Kitchen	Lauren Kitchen	Nguyễn Thị Thật	Vietnam (national team)
3	Meng Zhaojuan	Meng Zhaojuan	Meng Zhaojuan	Thailand (national team)
Final classification		Meng Zhaojuan	Meng Zhaojuan	Thailand (national team)

== See also ==
- 2015 in women's road cycling
