= 2019 Tour of Chongming Island =

2019 UCI Women's World Tour, race 10 of 23

Race details
- Dates: 9–11 May 2019
- Stages: 3
- Distance: 347.7 km (216.1 mi)
- Winning time: 8h 26' 14"

Results
Jersey awarded to the overall winner	Winner	Lorena Wiebes (NED)	(Parkhotel Valkenburg)
	Second	Jutatip Maneephan (THA)	(Thailand Women's Cycling Team)
	Third	Lotte Kopecky (BEL)	(Lotto–Soudal Ladies)
Jersey awarded to the points classification winner	Points	Lorena Wiebes (NED)	(Parkhotel Valkenburg)
Jersey awarded to the mountains classification winner	Mountains	Nina Kessler (NED)	(Tibco–Silicon Valley Bank)
Jersey awarded to the youth classification winner	Youth	Lorena Wiebes (NED)	(Parkhotel Valkenburg)

Youtube stage 1 summary

Youtube stage 2 summary

Youtube stage 3 summary

The 2019 Tour of Chongming Island was the thirteenth staging of the Tour of Chongming Island, a women's stage race held in Shanghai, China. It ran from 9 to 11 May 2019, as the 10th event of the 2019 UCI Women's World Tour. The race included 3 stages, covering a total of 347.7km.

All three stages ended in bunch sprints and were won by Lorena Wiebes, resulting in her winning the overall classification, points classification and young rider classification.

== Teams ==
Eighteen teams will participate in the race. Each team had a maximum of six riders:

Professional women's teams

- Mitchelton–Scott
- WNT–Rotor Pro Cycling
- Parkhotel Valkenburg
- BTC City Ljubljana
- Hitec Products–Birk Sport
- Tibco–Silicon Valley Bank
- Doltcini–Van Eyck Sport
- Cogeas–Mettler–Look
- Lotto–Soudal Ladies
- Massi–Tactic
- Servetto–Piumate–Beltrami TSA
- Team Illuminate
- Minsk Cycling Club
- China Liv Pro Cycling
- Thailand Women's Cycling Team
- Lviv Cycling Team

National teams

- Hong Kong
- China

== Stages overview ==
Stage	Date	start	finish	profile	distance	winner	general classification leader
1	9 May	Chongming	Chongming	flat stage	102.7 km	Lorena Wiebes (NED)	Lorena Wiebes (NED)
2	10 May	Changxing	Chongming	flat stage	126.6 km	Lorena Wiebes (NED)	Lorena Wiebes (NED)
3	11 May	Chongming	Chongming	flat stage	118.4 km	Lorena Wiebes (NED)	Lorena Wiebes (NED)

== Stages ==
=== Stage 1 ===
Stage 1 result

Rank	Rider	Team	Time
1	Lorena Wiebes (NED)	Parkhotel Valkenburg	2h 29' 29"
2	Lotte Kopecky (BEL)	Lotto–Soudal Ladies	s.t.
3	Nina Kessler (NED)	Doltcini–Van Eyck Sport	s.t.
4	Lucy Garner (GBR)	Hitec Products–Birk Sport	s.t.
5	Marta Tagliaferro (ITA)	Hitec Products–Birk Sport	s.t.
6	Sarah Roy (AUS)	Mitchelton–Scott	s.t.
7	Tatsiana Sharakova (BLR)	Minsk Cycling Club	s.t.
8	Saartje Vandenbroucke (BEL)	Doltcini–Van Eyck Sport	s.t.
9	Demi de Jong (NED)	Lotto–Soudal Ladies	s.t.
10	Valeriya Kononenko (UKR)	Lviv Cycling Team	s.t.

General classification after Stage 1

Rank	Rider	Team	Time
1	Lorena Wiebes (NED)	Parkhotel Valkenburg	2h 29' 14"
2	Lotte Kopecky (BEL)	Lotto–Soudal Ladies	+ 7"
3	Nina Kessler (NED)	Doltcini–Van Eyck Sport	+ 11"
4	Jutatip Maneephan (THA)	Thailand Women's Cycling Team	s.t.
5	Marta Tagliaferro (ITA)	Hitec Products–Birk Sport	+ 14"
6	Lucy Garner (GBR)	Hitec Products–Birk Sport	+ 15"
7	Sarah Roy (AUS)	Mitchelton–Scott	s.t.
8	Tatsiana Sharakova (BLR)	Minsk Cycling Club	s.t.
9	Saartje Vandenbroucke (BEL)	Doltcini–Van Eyck Sport	s.t.
10	Demi de Jong (NED)	Lotto–Soudal Ladies	s.t.

=== Stage 2 ===
Stage 2 result

Rank	Rider	Team	Time
1	Lorena Wiebes (NED)	Parkhotel Valkenburg	3h 05' 25"
2	Jutatip Maneephan (THA)	Thailand Women's Cycling Team	s.t.
3	Lucy Garner (GBR)	Hitec Products–Birk Sport	s.t.
4	Nina Kessler (NED)	Tibco–Silicon Valley Bank	s.t.
5	Pascale Jeuland-Tranchant (FRA)	Doltcini–Van Eyck Sport	s.t.
6	Marta Tagliaferro (ITA)	Hitec Products–Birk Sport	s.t.
7	Lotte Kopecky (BEL)	Lotto–Soudal Ladies	s.t.
8	Mia Radotic (CRO)	BTC City Ljubljana	s.t.
9	Sha Zhao Xi (CHN)	China Liv Pro Cycling	s.t.
10	Kelly Markus (NED)	Doltcini–Van Eyck Sport	s.t.

General classification after Stage 2

Rank	Rider	Team	Time
1	Lorena Wiebes (NED)	Parkhotel Valkenburg	5h 34' 25"
2	Jutatip Maneephan (THA)	Thailand Women's Cycling Team	+ 17"
3	Lotte Kopecky (BEL)	Lotto–Soudal Ladies	+ 20"
4	Lucy Garner (GBR)	Hitec Products–Birk Sport	+ 25"
5	Nina Kessler (NED)	Doltcini–Van Eyck Sport	+ 25"
6	Tatsiana Sharakova (BLR)	Minsk Cycling Club	+ 26"
7	Sarah Roy (AUS)	Mitchelton–Scott	+ 27"
8	Marta Tagliaferro (ITA)	Hitec Products–Birk Sport	+ 28"
9	Pascale Jeuland-Tranchant (FRA)	Doltcini–Van Eyck Sport	+ 29"
10	Monique van de Ree (NED)	BTC City Ljubljana	s.t.

=== Stage 3 ===
Stage 3 result

Rank	Rider	Team	Time
1	Lorena Wiebes (NED)	Parkhotel Valkenburg	2h 52" 01'
2	Jutatip Maneephan (THA)	Thailand Women's Cycling Team	s.t.
3	Lotte Kopecky (BEL)	Lotto–Soudal Ladies	s.t.
4	Sha Zhao Xi (CHN)	China Liv Pro Cycling	s.t.
5	Lucy Garner (GBR)	Hitec Products–Birk Sport	s.t.
6	Sarah Roy (AUS)	Mitchelton–Scott	s.t.
7	Bryony van Velzen (NED)	Doltcini–Van Eyck Sport	s.t.
8	Lonneke Uneken (NED)	Hitec Products–Birk Sport	s.t.
9	Nina Kessler (NED)	Tibco–Silicon Valley Bank	s.t.
10	Lara Vieceli (ITA)	WNT–Rotor Pro Cycling	s.t.

General classification after Stage 3

Rank	Rider	Team	Time
1	Lorena Wiebes (NED)	Parkhotel Valkenburg	8h 26' 14"
2	Jutatip Maneephan (THA)	Thailand Women's Cycling Team	+ 22"
3	Lotte Kopecky (BEL)	Lotto–Soudal Ladies	+ 27"
4	Nina Kessler (NED)	Doltcini–Van Eyck Sport	+ 35"
5	Lucy Garner (GBR)	Hitec Products–Birk Sport	+ 37"
6	Marta Tagliaferro (ITA)	Hitec Products–Birk Sport	s.t.
7	Tatsiana Sharakova (BLR)	Minsk Cycling Club	+ 38"
8	Maaike Boogaard (NED)	BTC City Ljubljana	s.t.
9	Valeriya Kononenko (UKR)	Lviv Cycling Team	+ 39"
10	Pascale Jeuland-Tranchant (FRA)	Doltcini–Van Eyck Sport	+ 41"

== Classification leadership table ==
Classification leadership by stage
Stage	Winner	General classification	Points classification	Mountains classification	Young rider classification	Best Asian rider classification	Team classification
1	Lorena Wiebes	Lorena Wiebes	Lorena Wiebes	Nina Kessler	Lorena Wiebes	Jutatip Maneephan	
2	Lorena Wiebes	Lorena Wiebes	Lorena Wiebes	Nina Kessler	Lorena Wiebes	Jutatip Maneephan	
3	Lorena Wiebes	Lorena Wiebes	Lorena Wiebes	Nina Kessler	Lorena Wiebes	Jutatip Maneephan	
Final		Lorena Wiebes	Lorena Wiebes	Nina Kessler	Lorena Wiebes	Jutatip Maneephan	

== UCI World Tour ==
=== Attributed points ===
Position	1st	2nd	3rd	4th	5th	6th	7th	8th	9th	10th	11th	12th	13th	14th	15th	16-30th	31-40th
General classification	200	150	125	100	85	70	60	50	40	35	30	25	20	15	10	5	3
Stages	25	20	18	16	14	12	10	8	6	4
Leader's jersey	5
