= WCC Team =

Stateless cycling team

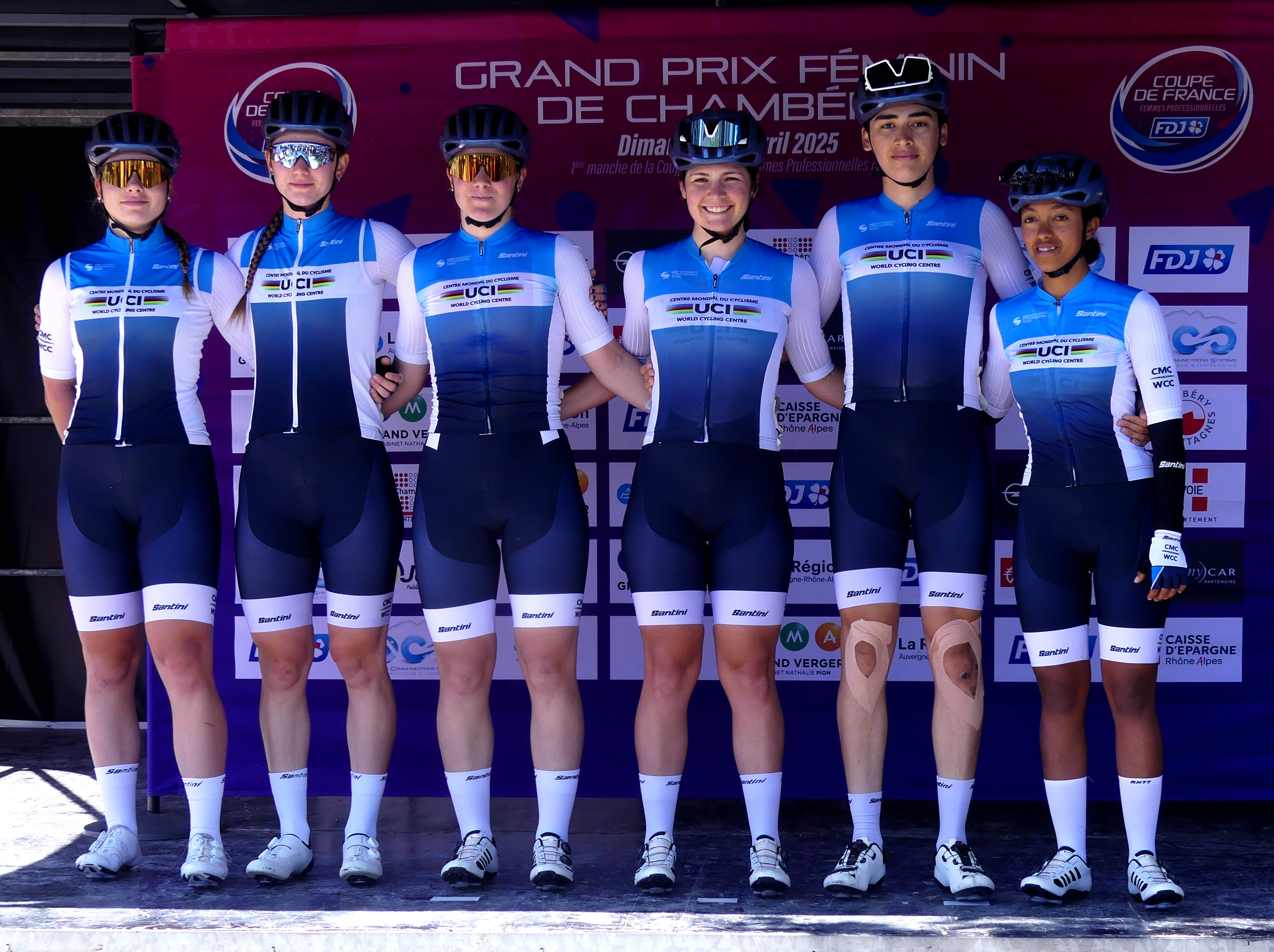

Team information
- UCI code: WCC (2018–)
- Founded: 2018
- Discipline: Road
- Status: National (2018); UCI Women's Team (2019); UCI Women's Continental Team (2020–)

Team name history
- 2018 2019–: UCI WCC Women's Team; WCC Team

WCC Team is a professional cycling team which competes in elite road bicycle racing events such as the UCI Women's World Tour and UCI ProSeries.

The team was established in 2018 by the Union Cycliste Internationale (UCI), with the UCI controlling and running the team from the World Cycling Centre in Aigle, Switzerland, as part of their aim to develop young cyclists from around the world.

== Team roster ==
As of 18 October 2024.

Rider	Date of birth
Shaxnoza Abdullayeva (UZB)	25 October 2001 (age 24)
Nika Bobnar (SVN)	4 June 2003 (age 23)
Terézia Ciriaková (SVK)	5 April 2005 (age 21)
Fariba Hashimi (AFG)	22 April 2003 (age 23)
Yulduz Hashimi (AFG)	8 July 2000 (age 26)
Anna Kolyzhuk (UKR)	21 March 2004 (age 22)

Rider	Date of birth
Dziyana Lebedz (BLR)	4 October 2002 (age 23)
Jasmin Liechti (SUI)	9 October 2002 (age 23)
Juliana Londoño (COL)	14 January 2005 (age 21)
Lize-Ann Louw (RSA)	13 March 2002 (age 24)
Valentine Nzayisenga (RWA)	15 March 2000 (age 26)

== Major results ==
2018
Stage 2 Tour of Thailand, Nguyễn Thị Thật
Dwars door de Westhoek, Nguyễn Thị Thật
Stage 2 Vuelta a Colombia Femenina, Paula Patiño

2019
Stage 2 Tour of Thailand, Teniel Campbell
Ljubljana–Domžale–Ljubljana TT, Marlen Reusser
Overall Kreiz Breizh Elites Dames, Teniel Campbell

Stages 1 & 2, Teniel Campbell

2024
Stage 5 Tour Cycliste Féminin International de l'Ardèche, Fariba Hashimi

== Continental and national champions ==
2018
Asian Cycling Championships, Nguyễn Thị Thật

2019
Eritrea Time Trial, Desiet Kidane
Ireland Road Race, Alice Sharpe
Switzerland Road Race, Marlen Reusser
Switzerland Time Trial, Marlen Reusser

2020
Belarus U23 Time Trial, Anastasiya Kolesava
Slovakia Road Race, Tereza Medveďová
Slovakia Time Trial, Tereza Medveďová

2021
Azerbaijan Road Race, Ayan Khankishiyeva
Azerbaijan Time Trial, Ayan Khankishiyeva
Slovakia Road Race, Tereza Medveďová

2024
Slovenia U23 Time Trial, Nika Bobnar
Switzerland U23 Time Trial, Jasmin Liechti
