= Dinah Chan =

Singaporean cyclist

Personal information
- Born: 24 May 1986 (age 40) Singapore

Chinese name
- Chinese: 曾秀卿
- Hanyu Pinyin: Zēng Xiùqīng
- Hokkien POJ: Chan Siùkheng

Sport
- Cycling career
- Sport: Cycling
- Current team: Retired
- Disciplines: Road; Track
- Role: Rider

Major wins
- Southeast Asian Games Time Trial (2013); National Road Race Championships (2009–2013); National Time Trial Championships (2011–2013, 2016)
Medal record
Women's road cycling
Representing Singapore
Southeast Asian Games
Gold medal – first place	2013 Naypyidaw	Individual time trial
Bronze medal – third place	2015 Singapore	Individual time trial
Bronze medal – third place	2011 Palembang	Road race
Bronze medal – third place	2011 Palembang	Individual time trial

Dinah Chan Siew Kheng (born 24 May 1986) is a Singaporean former road and track cyclist. Chan won the gold medal in the individual time trial at the 2013 South East Asian Games, held in Naypyidaw, Myanmar, ending a 16-year title drought for Singapore. Chan competed for Singapore at the 2010 and 2014 Asian Games in Incheon, South Korea, finishing 4th in the individual time trial in the latter. She also participated at the 2010 UCI Road World Championships and 2011 UCI Road World Championships.

== Major results ==
2009
1st Road race, National Road Championships
3rd Time trial, Southeast Asian Games
2010
1st Road race, National Road Championships
2011
National Road Championships

1st Road race
1st Time trial

Southeast Asian Games

3rd Road race
3rd Time trial

6th Time trial, Asian Road Championships
2012
National Road Championships

1st Road race
1st Time trial

2013
1st Time trial, Southeast Asian Games
National Road Championships

1st Road race
1st Time trial

8th Time trial, Asian Road Championships
2014
4th Time trial, Asian Games
2015
2nd Individual pursuit, Track Clubs ACC Cup
Southeast Asian Games

3rd Time trial
7th Road race

3rd Individual pursuit, Taiwan Hsin-Chu Track International Classic
2016
National Road Championships

1st Time trial
2nd Road race

8th Time trial, Asian Road Championships
