= Robin Manullang =

Indonesian cyclist

Personal information
- Full name: Robin Manullang
- Born: 11 April 1987 (age 39) Samarinda, Indonesia
- Height: 1.72 m (5 ft 8 in)
- Weight: 59 kg (130 lb)

Cycling career
- Sport: Cycling
- Discipline: Road
- Role: Rider

Amateur teams
- 2016: Lombok Bike Community
- 2017: United Bike Kencana

Professional teams
- 2015: Pegasus Continental Cycling Team
- 2018–2020: PGN Road Cycling Team
Medal record
Men's Cycling
Representing Indonesia
Southeast Asian Games
Gold medal – first place	2013 Naypyidaw	Team road race
Gold medal – first place	2015 Singapore	Individual time trial
Silver medal – second place	2011 Jakarta	Team time trial
Silver medal – second place	2013 Naypyidaw	Individual time trial
Silver medal – second place	2019 Philippines	Team time trial
Silver medal – second place	2019 Philippines	Team road race
Bronze medal – third place	2013 Naypyidaw	Road race
Bronze medal – third place	2017 Kuala Lumpur	Team pursuit

Robin Manullang (born 11 April 1987) is an Indonesian professional road bicycle racer, who most recently rode for UCI Continental team Mula Cycling Team. He won a silver medal in the 50-kilometre (31-mile) individual time trial, a bronze medal in the 163-kilometre (101-mile) road race and a gold medal in the 163-kilometre (101-mile) team road race at the 2013 Southeast Asian Games. At the 2015 Southeast Asian Games, he won a gold medal in the individual time trial.

== Major results ==
2010
10th Overall Tour de East Java
2011
2nd Team time trial, Southeast Asian Games
2012
6th Time trial, Asian Road Championships
2013
Southeast Asian Games

1st Team road race
2nd Time trial
3rd Road race

9th Overall Tour de Singkarak
2015
1st Time trial, Southeast Asian Games
2016
5th Overall Tour de Flores
2017
3rd Team pursuit, Southeast Asian Games
2018
10th Road race, Asian Games
2019
Southeast Asian Games

2nd Team road race
2nd Team time trial

3rd Time trial, National Road Championships
