= List of Singaporean records in track cycling =

The following are the national records in track cycling in Singapore, maintained by its national cycling federation, Singapore Cycling Federation.

== Men ==
Event	Record	Athlete	Date	Meet	Place	Ref
Flying 200 m time trial	10.491	Mohamed Elyas Bin Mohamed Yusoff	21 June 2022	Asian Championships	New Delhi, India	
Flying 500 m time trial						
500 m time trial	33.626	Mohamed Elyas Bin Mohamed Yusoff	11 January 2019	Asian Championships	Jakarta, Indonesia	
Flying 1 km time trial						
1 km time trial	1:03.929	Mohamed Elyas Bin Mohamed Yusoff	29 August 2017	Southeast Asian Games	Nilai, Malaysia	
Team sprint	46.967	Darren Low; Mohamed Elyas Bin Mohamed Yusoff; Lance Tan Wei Sheng	27 August 2017	Southeast Asian Games	Nilai, Malaysia	
4000 m individual pursuit						
4000 m team pursuit	4:35.246	Lance Tan Wei Sheng; Calvin Sim; Goh Choon Huat; Darren Low	29 August 2017	Southeast Asian Games	Nilai, Malaysia	
Hour record						

== Women ==
Event	Record	Athlete	Date	Meet	Place	Ref
Flying 200 m time trial						
250 m time trial (standing start)						
500 m time trial						
Team sprint						
3000 m individual pursuit	3:44.234	Luo Yiwei	18 October 2019	Asian Championships	Jincheon, South Korea	
3000 m team pursuit						
Hour record						
