= Nguyễn Thị Thật =

Vietnamese cyclist (born 1993)

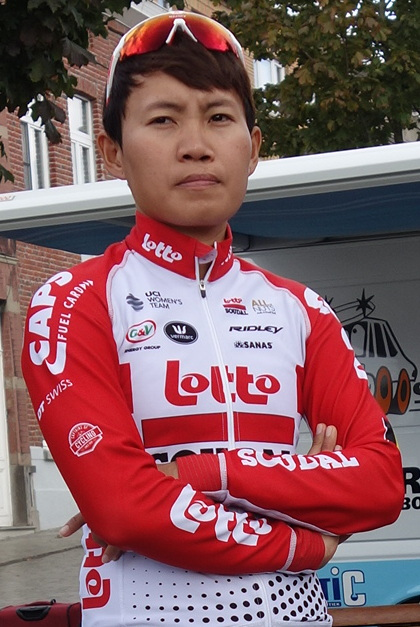
- Nguyễn in 2019

Personal information
- Full name: Nguyễn Thị Thật
- Born: 6 March 1993 (age 33) Tinh Bien, An Giang, Vietnam
- Height: 1.65 m (5 ft 5 in)
- Weight: 50 kg (110 lb)

Cycling career
- Sport: Cycling
- Current team: Roland Le Dévoluy
- Disciplines: Road; Track
- Role: Rider

Amateur team
- 2018: UCI WCC Women's Team

Professional teams
- 2019–2020: Lotto–Soudal Ladies
- 2023–: Israel Premier Tech Roland

Major wins
- One day races & Classics Dwars door de Westhoek (2018)
Medal record
Women's road bicycle racing
Representing Vietnam
Silver medal – second place	2025 Phitsanulok	Road race

Nguyễn Thị Thật (born 6 March 1993) is a Vietnamese road and track cyclist, who rides for UCI Women's WorldTeam Roland Le Dévoluy.

== Major results ==
2010
1st Stage 6 An Giang Television Cup
2nd Road race, Asian Junior Road Championships
2011
1st Stage 2 An Giang Television Cup
2nd Road race, Asian Junior Road Championships
2012
1st Overall An Giang Television Cup

1st Stages 2, 4 & 6

8th Overall Tour of Thailand
2013
3rd Road race, Southeast Asian Games
5th Road race, Asian Road Championships
2014
1st Overall Biwase Cup

1st Stages 1, 3 & 7

2nd Road race, Asian Games
5th Road race, Asian Road Championships
2015
Southeast Asian Games

1st Road race
2nd Criterium

3rd Overall The Princess Maha Chackri Sirindhon's Cup

1st Stage 1

5th Road race, Asian Road Championships
8th Overall Biwase Cup

1st Stages 3 & 4

2016
3rd Overall Biwase Cup

1st Stages 1, 5 & 8

7th L'Enfer du Chablais
9th Thun-West Time Trial
2017
Southeast Asian Games

1st Road race
1st Time trial

2nd Overall Tour of Thailand

1st Points classification
1st Stages 1 & 2

6th Overall Biwase Cup

1st Stages 3, 4 & 7

9th Road race, Asian Road Championships
2018
1st Road race, Asian Road Championships
1st Dwars door de Westhoek
1st Grand Prix Crevoisier
2nd Grand Prix de Chambéry
3rd GP Sofie Goos
5th Road race, Asian Games
7th Trofee Maarten Wynants
9th La Classique Morbihan
10th Overall The Princess Maha Chackri Sirindhon's Cup

1st Stage 2

2019
Southeast Asian Games

1st Road race
4th Time trial

1st Tour of Zhoushan Island I
1st GP de Fourmies / La Voix du Nord Women
2nd Erondegemse Pijl
3rd Vuelta a la Comunitat Valenciana Feminas
9th Flanders Ladies Classic
2022
Southeast Asian Games

1st Road race
1st Team road race
2nd Criterium

1st Road race, Asian Road Championships
2023
Southeast Asian Games

1st Road race
2nd Criterium

5th Overall The Princess Maha Chackri Sirindhon's Cup

1st Stage 2
1st Points classification
1st Mountains classification
