= Fariba Hashimi =

Afghan cyclist (born 2003)

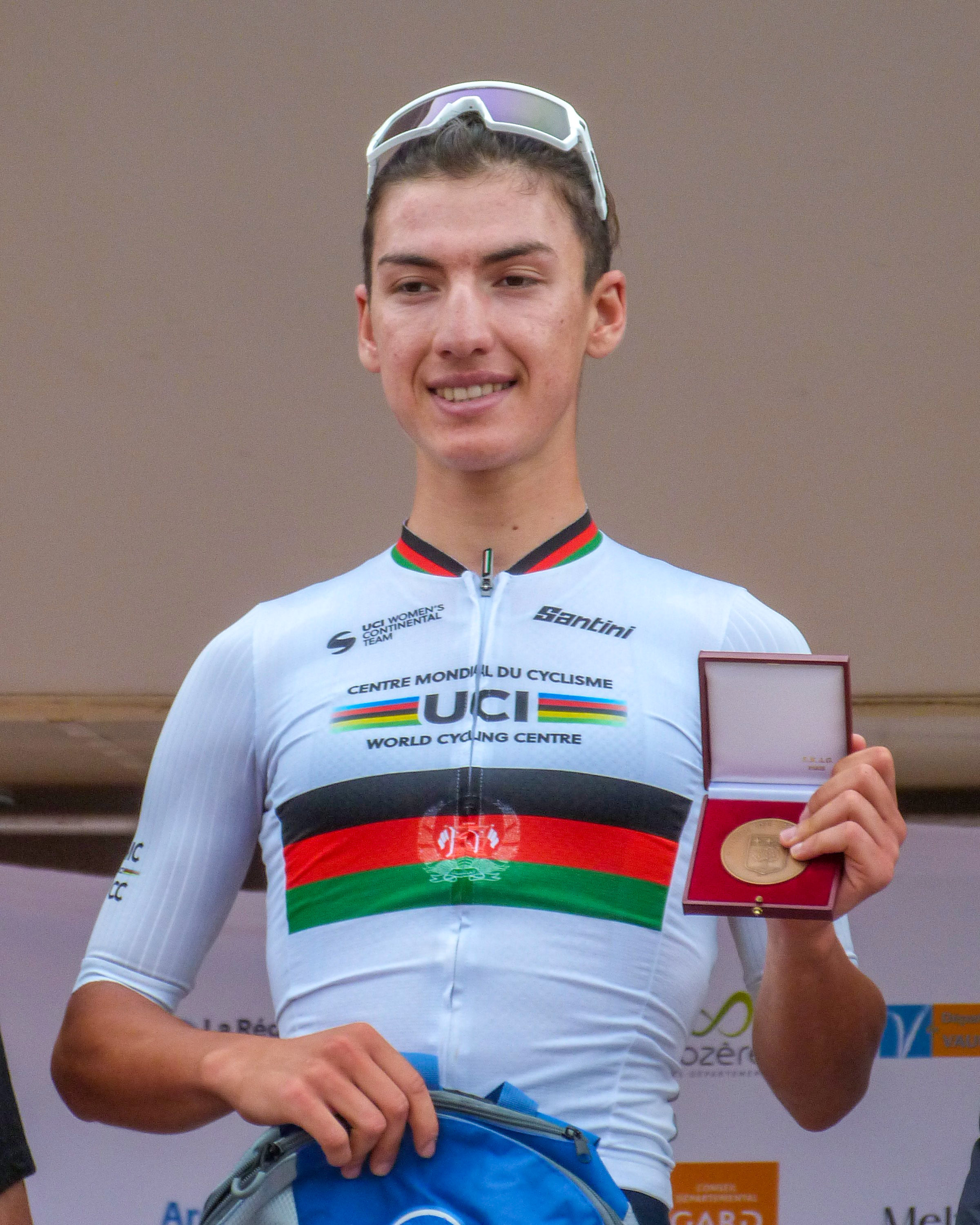
- Hashimi in 2024

Personal information
- Born: 22 April 2003 (age 23) Maīmanah, Afghanistan

Cycling career
- Sport: Cycling
- Current team: Vini Fantini–BePink
- Discipline: Road
- Role: Rider

Professional teams
- 2022: Valcar–Travel & Service
- 2023: Israel Premier Tech Roland Development
- 2024: WCC Team
- 2025: Ceratizit Pro Cycling
- 2026: Vini Fantini–BePink
Medal record
Women's road bicycle racing
Representing Afghanistan
Asian Games
Silver medal – second place	2026 Aichi-Nagoya	Women's road race

Fariba Hashimi (born 22 April 2003) is an Afghan racing cyclist, who currently rides for UCI Women's Continental team Vini Fantini–BePink. She competed in the road race at the 2024 Paris Olympics alongside her sister Yulduz, despite the Taliban government's ban on women in sports.

In 2022, she won the Afghan road race championships, which were held in Aigle, Switzerland.

== Early life ==
Hashimi was born on 22 April 2003 in Maimana, the capital of Faryab Province in northern Afghanistan. She took up cycling at the age of 15 following her older sister Yulduz Hashimi into the sport. Because of local hostility towards women cycling in public, Hashimi trained in male clothing, layering two to three masks over her face to conceal her identity, and was on occasion attacked with thrown stones.

== Escape from Afghanistan ==
Hashimi fled Afghanistan in 2021, following the Taliban's return to power, with the assistance of Italian former road racing world champion Alessandra Cappellotto. She relocated to Italy, where she has since lived and trained, and has said she has not been able to see her family since her leaving.

== Career ==
Hashimi turned professional with Valcar–Travel & Service in 2022. in October of that year she won the Women's Road Championships of Afghanistan. Later that year she won a stage of the Tour de l'Ardèche, becoming the first female Afghan cyclist to win a UCI-sanctioned race. She rode for Israel Premier Tech Roland Development in 2023 and WWC team in 2024, before joining Ceratizit Pro Cycling in 2025. In 2024, Hashimi and her sister Yulduz were selected as two of six athletes on a gender-equal team representing Afghanistan at the 2024 Summer Olympics in Paris, arranged with the assistance of the International Olympic Committee. At the 2026 Asian Games in Aichi-Nagoya, Japan, Hashimi finished 7th in the Women's individual time trial before winning the silver medal in the women's road race on 22 September 2026 becoming Afghanistan's first female medallist at the Asian Games since 2002.

== Major results ==
2022
1st Road race, National Road Championships
2023
10th Time trial, Asian Under-23 Road Championships
2024
1st Stage 5 Tour Cycliste Féminin International de l'Ardèche
4th Time trial, Asian Under-23 Road Championships
8th Overall Tour de l'Avenir Femmes
10th Overall Giro Mediterraneo Rosa

== Personal life ==
Hashimi has said she hopes her cycling career inspires other Afghan women and girls, telling Al Jazeera: "I was born inside a country where the women who dream are getting attacked, and I'm really happy that I have fought against that."
