= Guo Li (cyclist) =

Chinese cyclist (born 2000)

Li Guo
Personal information
- Born: 8 October 2000 (age 26)

Cycling career
- Sport: Cycling
- Current team: XDS China Women Team
- Discipline: Road
- Role: Rider

Professional teams
- 2025: Li Ning Star Ladies
- 2026–: XDS China Women Team
Medal record
Representing China
Women's road bicycle racing
Asian Games
Gold medal – first place	2026 Aichi–Nagoya	Road Race

Li Guo (Chinese: 郭莉, born 8 October 2000) is a Chinese professional racing cyclist who rides for the UCI women's continental team XDS China Women Team. She is the 2026 national road race champion.

She became 2026 Asian Games champion in the women's road race event.

== Major results ==
2023
7th Road race, National Championships

2024
7th Time trial, National Championships

2025
5th Road race, National Championships

2026
Road Race, 2026 Asian Games
1st National Championships
2nd Time trial, National Championships
6th Overall BIWASE Cup
9th Overall BIWASE Tour of Vietnam
