= Darren Low =

Singaporean bicycle racer

boon thien
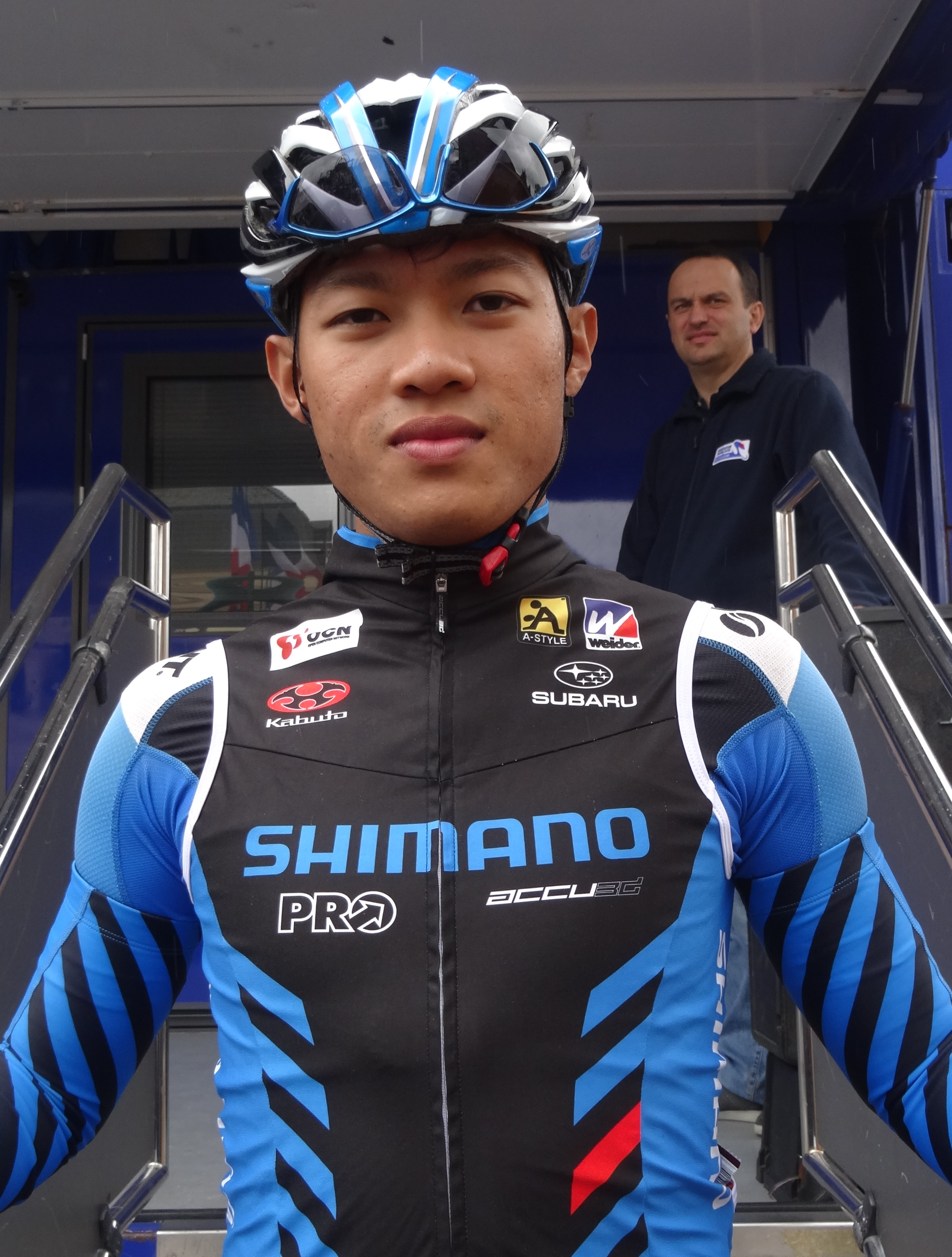
- Low in 2014

Personal information
- Full name: Darren Low
- Born: July 14, 1988 (age 38) Singapore

Cycling career
- Sport: Cycling
- Current team: Retired
- Disciplines: Road; Track
- Role: Rider

Professional teams
- 2012: OCBC Singapore Continental Cycling Team
- 2014–2015: Shimano Racing Team
Medal record
Men's Cycling (sport)
Representing Singapore
Southeast Asian Games
Silver medal – second place	2011 Palembang	Individual Time Trial

Darren Low (simplified Chinese: 刘德伦; traditional Chinese: 劉德倫; pinyin: Liú Délún; born July 14, 1988) is a Singaporean former professional cyclist. Low is a two-time National Champion for both the road race and the individual time trial. Low won the silver medal in the 50-kilometre (31-mile)-long individual time trial at the 2011 Southeast Asian Games.

== Major results ==
2010
National Road Championships

1st Road race
1st Time trial

2011
1st Time trial, National Road Championships
2nd Time trial, Southeast Asian Games
2012
National Road Championships

1st Road race
3rd Time trial

2015
9th Time trial, Southeast Asian Games
2016
3rd Time trial, National Road Championships

== See also ==
- List of Singaporean records in track cycling
