= Lance Tan =

Singaporean athlete

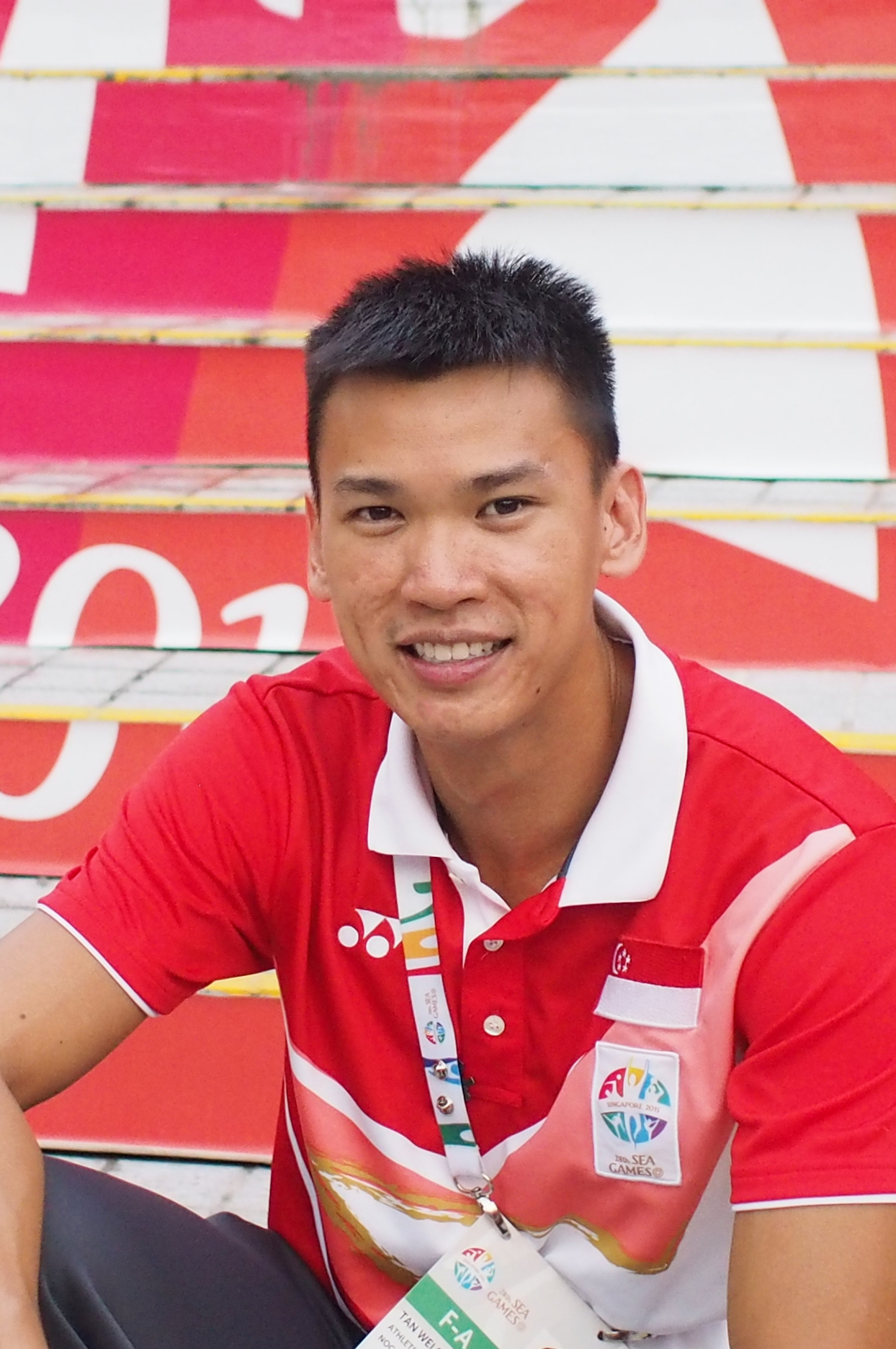
- Lance Tan at the 2015 South East Asian Games

Personal information
- Full name: Tan Wei Sheng Lance
- Born: 14 May 1987 (age 39) Singapore
- Height: 1.78 m (5 ft 10 in)
- Weight: 73 kg (161 lb)

Sport
- Country: Singapore
Medal record
Athletics (sport)
Representing Singapore
Southeast Asian Games
Bronze medal – third place	2011 Palembang	4 x 400 m relay
ASEAN University Games
Bronze medal – third place	2010 Chang Mai	4 x 100 m relay
Track Cycling
Representing Singapore
Queen's Cup
Gold medal – first place	2017 Bangkok	1 kilometer time trial

Lance Tan Wei Sheng (born 14 May 1987) is a former Singaporean track and field athlete and track cyclist. Tan is a multiple national record holder in various events & disciplines. Tan won the bronze medal at the 2011 SEA Games. and competed in the decathlon at the 2015 SEA Games. Tan then switched sport to track cycling, representing Singapore at the 2017 SEA Games and the 2018 Asian Track Championships. He achieved a career-high UCI world rankings of 101st when he finished 14th at the Asian Track Championships.

Tan is an engineering scientist by profession, holding various patents and recognized for contributions to local SME ecosystems through development of innovative and commercially successful products.

== Career ==
=== Athletics (2004–2015) ===
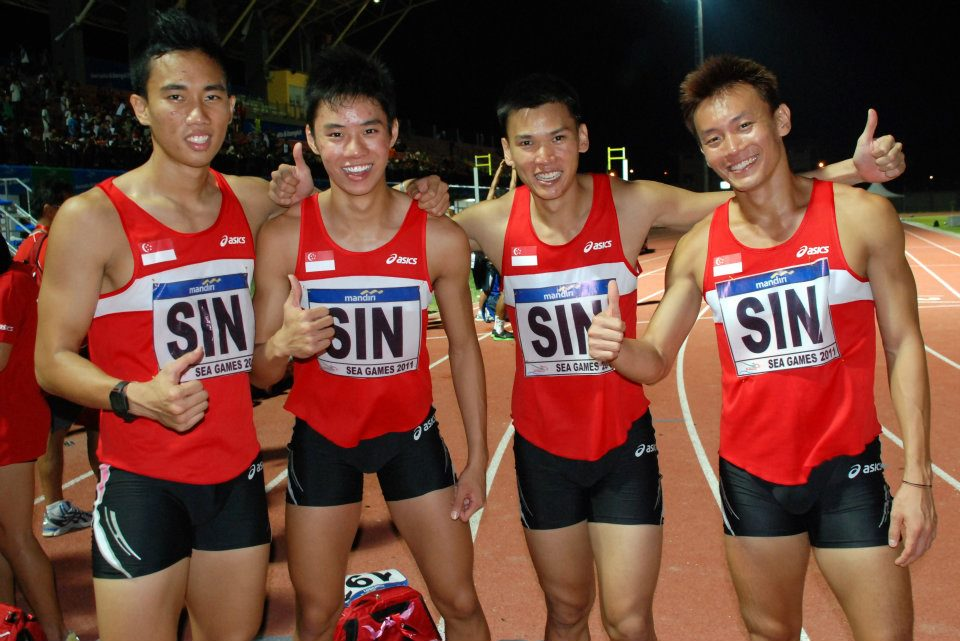
Singapore Men's 4 × 400 m team after their race at the 2011 SEA Games.(L-R)Md Zaki Sapari, Ng Chin Hui, Lance Tan and Kenneth Khoo

In 2004, Tan competed in the 100m event at the Commonwealth Youth Games held in Bendigo, Australia. He finished 6th in his heat and did not advance to the next round.

In 2005, Tan is also part of the quartet that set the National Junior 4 × 100 m record with a time of 41.28s, at the ASEAN Schools Track and Field Championships.

Tan represented Singapore at the 2006 IAAF World Junior Championships in Athletics, held in Beijing, China. In 2007, Tan tore his left knee ligaments and calf muscles while serving National service in Singapore but made a successful return from his injuries and participated at the 2009 Singapore Open, where he clocked a personal best of 10.68s in the 100m sprint.

In 2010, Tan, together with Elfi Mustapa, Gary Yeo and Amirudin Jamal won bronze in the 4 × 100 m relay at the 15th ASEAN University Games held in Chiang Mai, Thailand. The team finished behind Indonesia and Thailand with a time of 40.62s.

At the 2011 SEA Games held in Palembang, Indonesia, Tan was in the Singapore team that won the bronze medal in the 4 × 400 m relay.

Tan won the 400m event at the inaugural Singapore National Games in 2012. He clinched the silver medal in the 400m Open category at the 2012 National Championships, a feat he repeated in the 2013 edition.

Tan represented Singapore in the decathlon at the 2015 SEA Games, finishing 8th with a new personal best before retiring from athletics.

=== Cycling (2016–2018) ===
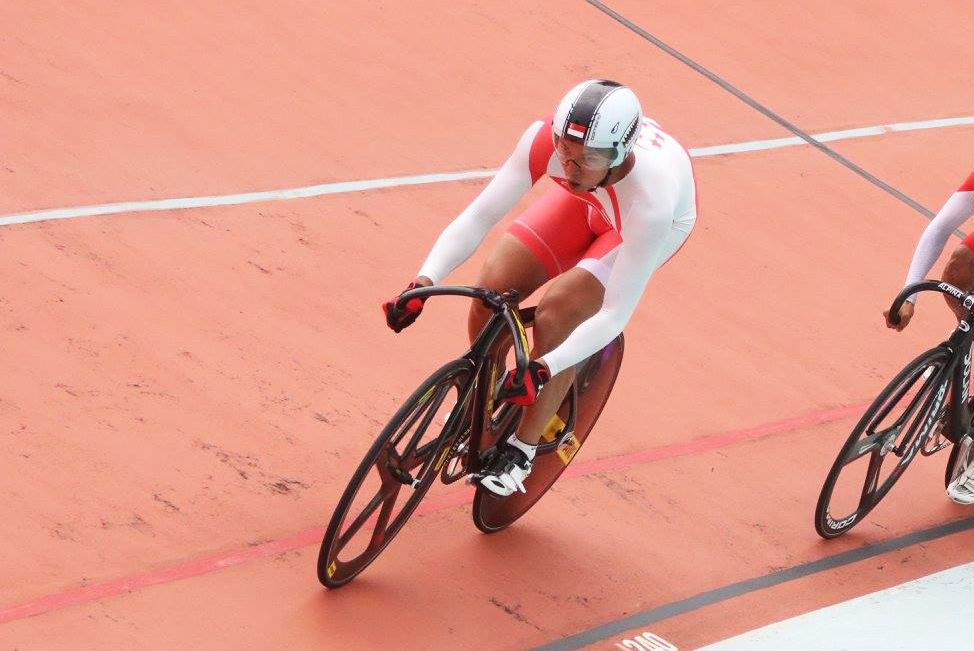
ACC Track ASIA Cup 2016 - Team Sprint- Singapore - Lance Tan

In 2016, Tan switched to track cycling, representing Singapore in the sprint and team sprint at the Asian Cycling Confederation Track Asia Cup, finishing tenth and fourth respectively. Lance also won the yellow jersey in the OCBC Cycle Road Series, accumulating the most points over four races.

Tan competed at the 2017 SEA Games, representing Singapore in Cycling (Track). With the cycling team, Tan set new national records in the Team Sprint and Team Pursuit of 46.883s and 4m:35.246s respectively, qualifying for the bronze medal finals for both events and eventually finishing 4th in both events. In the individual match sprint, Tan qualified for the quarter-finals with a 200m time of 11.083s and failed to qualify for the semi-finals.

Later that year, Tan won the one kilometre time trial event at the Queen's Cup held in Thailand with a time of 1 minute 8.557 seconds.
He qualified for the 2018 Asian Cycling Championships, clocking a personal record 1 minute 6.141 seconds and becoming the second fastest Singaporean over the distance. He ended the 2018 season ranked 14th in Asia and 101st in the world.

=== Research engineer (2012–present) ===
In 2012, Tan joined the Agency for Science, Technology and Research (A*STAR), and as of 2021 is a senior specialist and engineering scientist. He was awarded the distinguished A*STAR Excellence Award in 2020 for exceptional contributions to the SME ecosystem by developing innovative, marketable products and improving the research and development (R&D) capabilities of the commercial companies.

== See also ==
- List of Singaporean records in track cycling
