= Jukia Yoshimura =

Japanese BMX rider

Personal information
- Born: 18 February 1993 (age 33)

Cycling career
- Sport: Cycling
- Current team: Japan
- Discipline: BMX racing
- Role: Rider

Jukia Yoshimura (born 18 February 1993) is a Japanese male BMX rider, representing his nation at international competitions. He competed in the time trial event at the 2015 UCI BMX World Championships.
