= Jutatip Maneephan =

Thai racing cyclist (born 1988)

Personal information
- Full name: Jutatip Maneephan; Thai: จุฑาธิป มณีพันธุ์
- Born: 8 July 1988 (age 38) Roi Et Province, Thailand

Cycling career
- Sport: Cycling
- Current team: Thailand Women's Cycling Team
- Disciplines: Track; Road
- Role: Rider
- Rider type: Sprinter

Professional teams
- 2017: S.C. Michela Fanini Rox
- 2018–2019: Thailand Women's Cycling Team
- 2020: Alé BTC Ljubljana
- 2023–: Thailand Women's Cycling Team
Medal record
Women's road bicycle racing
Representing Thailand
Asian Games
Gold medal – first place	2014 Incheon	Road race
Bronze medal – third place	2022 Hangzhou	Road race
Asian Championships
Gold medal – first place	2025 Phitsanulok	Road race

Jutatip Maneephan (Thai: จุฑาธิป มณีพันธุ์; born 8 July 1988) is a Thai road bicycle racer and track cyclist, who rides for UCI Women's Continental Team Thailand Women's Cycling Team.

== Career ==
Maneephan was born and raised in the Roi Et Province in Thailand's Northeast region.

Maneephan began her cycling career as a track cyclist. She competed at the 2008, 2009 and 2010 UCI Track Cycling World Championships. She switched to road racing and was the gold medalist in the women's road race competition during the 2009 Southeast Asian Games (SEA Games). She competed at the 2012 Summer Olympics in the Women's road race, but failed to finish.

Maneephan was recruited to ride for the Italian pro team S.C. Michela Fanini Rox after her performance at the 2012 Olympic Games in London, though her debut on the team was delayed after she was hit by a pickup truck during a training ride, breaking two ribs. She competed at the 2016 Olympics.

== Major results ==
=== Road ===
2009
1st Road race, Southeast Asian Games
2010
3rd Road race, Asian Road Championships
7th Road race, Asian Games
2011
2nd Time trial, National Road Championships
3rd Road race, Asian Road Championships
2012
1st Stage 1 The Princess Maha Chackri Sirindhorn's Cup "Women's Tour of Thailand"
2nd Overall Tour of Zhoushan Island
3rd Road race, Asian Road Championships
6th Overall Tour of Chongming Island
2013
2nd Road race, Southeast Asian Games
2014
1st Road race, Asian Games
2nd Overall The Princess Maha Chackri Sirindhorn's Cup "Women's Tour of Thailand"

1st Stage 1
1st Point classification

2nd Overall Biwase Cup

1st Stages 5 & 8

4th Road race, Asian Road Championships
2015
Southeast Asian Games

1st Criterium
2nd Road race

National Road Championships

1st Road race
1st Time trial

6th Overall The Princess Maha Chackri Sirindhorn's Cup "Women's Tour of Thailand"
10th Tour of Chongming Island World Cup
2016
1st Overall Tour of Udon

1st Points classification
1st Stages 1 & 2

1st Udon Thani's Anniversary International Cycling
5th Overall The Princess Maha Chackri Sirindhorn's Cup "Women's Tour of Thailand"

1st Points classification

2017
3rd Criterium, Southeast Asian Games
2018
The Princess Maha Chackri Sirindhorn's Cup "Women's Tour of Thailand"

1st Stages 1b & 3

Biwase Cup

1st Stages 1, 4, 7 & 8

5th Overall Panorama Guizhou International Women's Road Cycling Race
2019
1st Overall The Princess Maha Chackri Sirindhorn's Cup "Women's Tour of Thailand"

1st Points classification
1st Asian rider classification
1st Stages 1 & 3

1st The 60th Anniversary 'Thai Cycling Association' - The Golden Era Celebration
2nd Overall The 60th Anniversary Thai Cycling Association

1st Points classification
1st Stage 1

2nd Overall Tour of Chongming Island
2020
1st Road race, National Road Championships
1st Overall The Princess Maha Chackri Sirindhorn's Cup "Women's Tour of Thailand"

1st Asian rider classification
1st Stages 1 & 2

2021
3rd Overall The Princess Maha Chackri Sirindhorn's Cup "Women's Tour of Thailand"

1st Stage 3

4th Road race, National Road Championships
2022
1st Road race, National Road Championships
The Princess Maha Chackri Sirindhorn's Cup "Women's Tour of Thailand"

1st Points classification
1st Stages 1 & 3

2023
Southeast Asian Games

1st Criterium
2nd Road race

6th Overall The Princess Maha Chackri Sirindhorn's Cup "Women's Tour of Thailand"

1st Stage 1

=== Track ===
2013
3rd Scratch, ACC Track Asia Cup – Thailand Round
2015
Track Clubs ACC Cup

2nd Keirin
3rd Scratch

2019
National Track Championships

1st 500m time trial
1st Sprint
2nd Individual pursuit
2nd Keirin
