= Wilaiwan Kunlapha =

Thai cyclist

Personal information
- Full name: Wilaiwan Kunlapha
- Born: 25 December 1987 (age 38) Thailand

Cycling career
- Sport: Cycling
- Current team: Thailand Women's Cycling Team
- Discipline: Road
- Role: Rider

Professional team
- 2017–: Thailand Women's Cycling Team

Wilaiwan Kunlapha (born 25 December 1987) is a Thai road cyclist, who currently rides for UCI Women's Continental Team Thailand Women's Cycling Team. She represented her nation at the 2009 UCI Road World Championships.
