= Chinese Taipei Cycling Association =

National governing body of cycle racing in Taiwan

The Chinese Taipei Cycling Association (CTCA; Chinese: 中華民國自由車協會; pinyin: Zhōnghuá Mínguó Zìyóuchē Xiéhuì) is the national governing body of cycle racing in Taiwan.

Founded in 1974, the CTCA is a member of the Union Cycliste Internationale and the Asian Cycling Confederation.

== See also ==
- Chinese Taipei
