= Thuzar =

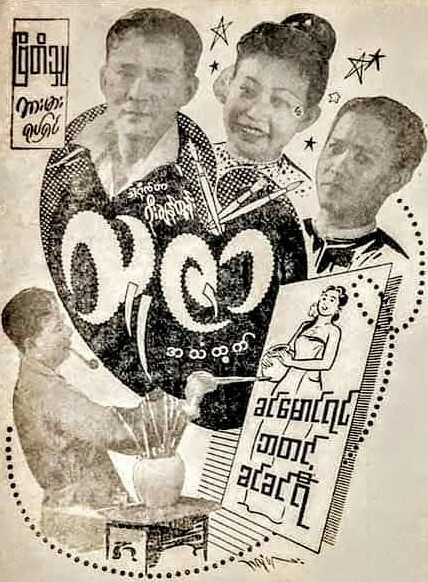
- Film poster
- Burmese: သူဇာ
- Directed by: Chan Tun
- Screenplay by: Nyar Na
- Produced by: British Burma Film Company
- Starring: Ba Tint; Khin Maung Yin; Khin Khin Yee
- Distributed by: British Burma Film Company
- Release date: 1940
- Running time: 102 minutes
- Country: Burma
- Language: Burmese

Thuzar (Burmese: သူဇာ, pronounced [θùzà]) is a 1940 Burmese black-and-white drama film directed by Chan Tun starring Ba Tint, Khin Maung Yin and Khin Khin Yee.

== Cast ==
- Ba Tint as Ba Tint
- Khin Maung Yin as Khin Maung Yin
- Khin Khin Yee as Khin Khin Yee
