= Yulduz Hashimi =

Afghan cyclist (born 2000)

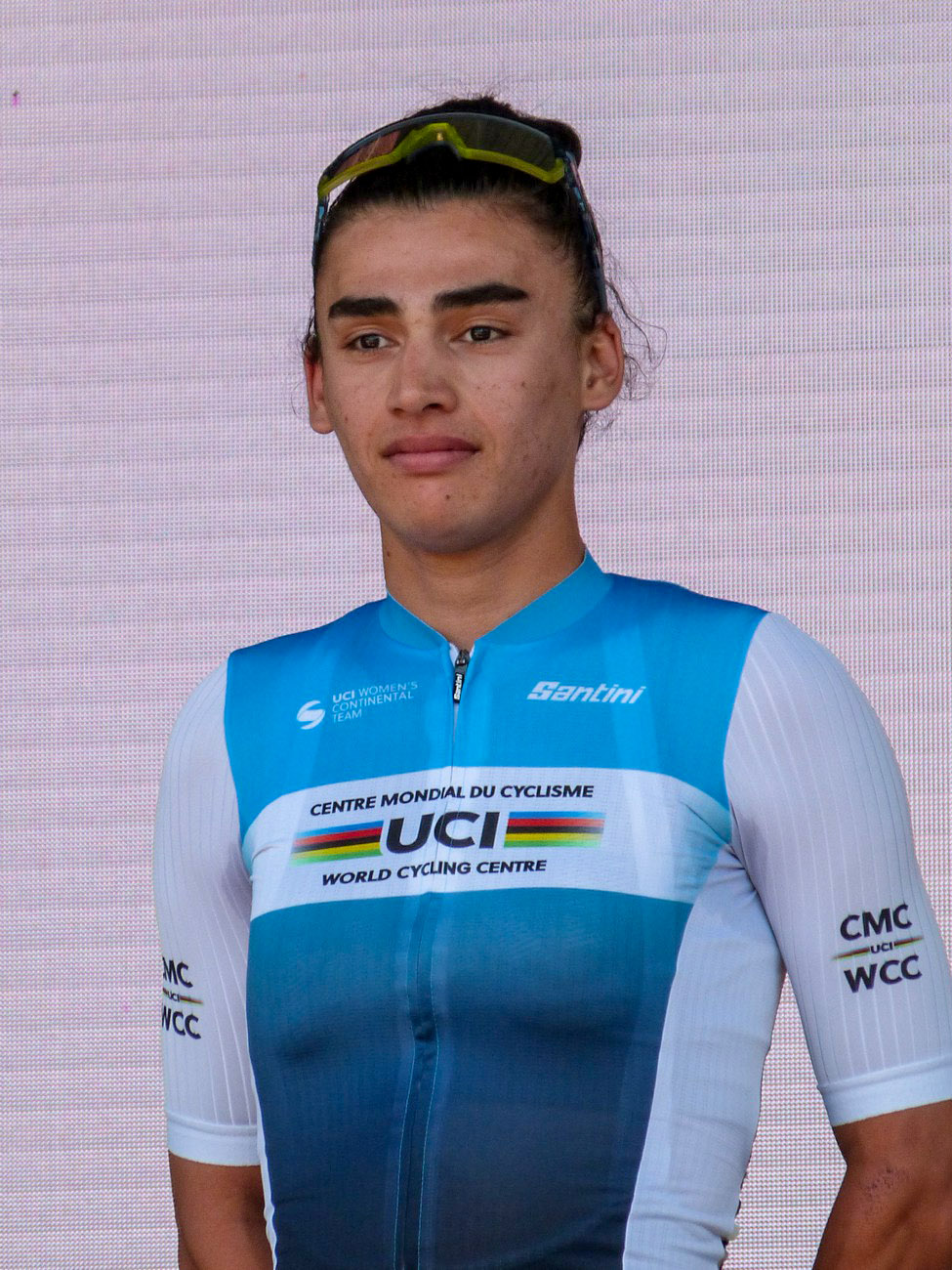
- Hashimi in 2024

Personal information
- Born: 8 July 2000 (age 26) Maīmanah, Afghanistan

Cycling career
- Sport: Cycling
- Current team: WCC Team
- Discipline: Road
- Role: Rider

Professional teams
- 2022: Valcar–Travel & Service
- 2023: Green Project–Bardiani–CSF–Faizanè
- 2024–: WCC Team

Yulduz Hashimi (born 8 July 2000) is an Afghan racing cyclist, who currently rides for UCI Women's Continental Team WCC Team. She competed for Afghanistan in both the time trial and the road race at the 2024 Summer Olympics alongside her sister Fariba, despite the Taliban government's ban on women in sports. They were the first women to compete in cycling for Afghanistan. Hashimi finished 26th in the time trial at the 2024 Olympics.

== Major results ==
2022
2nd Road race, National Road Championships
2023
10th Time trial, Asian Games
2024
10th Gran Premio della Liberazione
2025
9th Time trial, Asian Road Championships
