= Purnomo =

Purnomo is both an Indonesian surname and an Indonesian given name. Notable people with the surname include:

- Adrianus Purnomo (born 2000), Indonesian football player
- Mohamed Purnomo (1961–2019), Indonesian sprinter
- Saptoyoga Purnomo (born 1998), Indonesian Paralympic sprinter

== Given name ==
- Purnomo Kasidi (1933–1996), Indonesian politician
- Purnomo Yusgiantoro (born 1951), Indonesian politician
