= Daniel Caluag =

Filipino American BMX racer (born 1987)

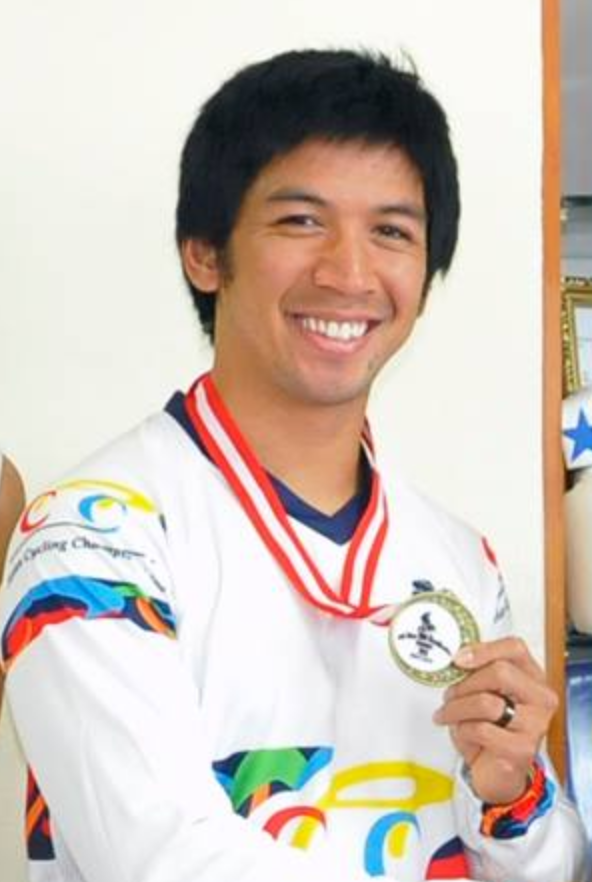
- Caluag in 2013

Personal information
- Full name: Daniel Patrick Manabat Caluag
- Nickname: Danny C
- Born: January 15, 1987 (age 39) Harbor City, Los Angeles, U.S.
- Height: 167 cm (5 ft 6 in)
- Weight: 77 kg (170 lb)

Cycling career
- Sport: Cycling
- Discipline: BMX
- Role: Rider
Medal record
Men's Bicycle motocross
Representing United States
UCI BMX World Championships
Silver medal – second place	2007 Victoria, British Columbia	Elite Men Cruiser
Representing Philippines
Asian BMX Cycling Championships
Gold medal – first place	2013 Singapore	Elite Men
Asian Games
Gold medal – first place	2014 Incheon	BMX
Bronze medal – third place	2018 Jakarta–Palembang	BMX
Southeast Asian Games
Gold medal – first place	2013 Naypyidaw	BMX
Silver medal – second place	2019 Philippines	BMX

Daniel Patrick Manabat Caluag (born January 15, 1987) is a Filipino American BMX racer who competed for the Philippines in the BMX event of the 2012 Summer Olympics. Caluag was eliminated after the qualifying heats. He won the men's elite gold medal in the 2013 Asian BMX Cycling Championships in Singapore.

On October 1, 2014, the Filipino Olympian has set another milestone by winning the Philippines' first and only gold medal in BMX Cycling at the 17th Asian Games 2014 in Incheon, South Korea.

Caluag was named 2014 Athlete of the Year trophy at the Philippine Sportswriters Association Awards Night. Caluag was also part of the 14 scholar-athletes who have scholarships from the Olympic Solidarity Movement under the Philippine Olympic Committee.

== Early life ==
Caluag was born to Daniel Ramos Caluag and Isabelita Manabat Caluag. Both of Caluag's parents were involved in the field of medicine, with Daniel Ramos being a respiratory therapist from Malolos, Bulacan and Isabelita being a registered nurse from Licab, Nueva Ecija. Both of his parents migrated separately and met in California with Daniel Ramos first migrating to Guam at a young age before migrating to the US mainland. Caluag and his only sibling and brother, Christopher was born in the United States.

== Personal life ==
Daniel Caluag resides in Lexington in the US state of Kentucky with his Stephanie with whom he has a baby daughter named Sydney. His brother, Christopher lives in California and bikes with Daniel whenever he later visits. Daniel Caluag and his wife earned their nursing degrees at the Lindsey Wilson College in Lexington last May 2014. As of March 2015, Caluag and his wife works at the UK HealthCare in Lexington. Caluag works at the medical/surgical oncology and bone transplant unit at the Markey Cancer Center of UK HealthCare.
