= Thailand Women's Cycling Team =

Thai cycling team

Team information
- UCI code: TWC
- Registered: Thailand
- Founded: 2017
- Disbanded: 2020
- Discipline: Road
- Status: UCI Women's Team (2017–2019); UCI Women's Continental Team (2020)

Key personnel
- General manager: Adisak Wannasri
- Team managers: Wisut Kasiyaphat; Narutchai Khaoyun; Sithichai Rittisil

Team name history
- Thailand Women's Cycling Team

Thailand Women's Cycling Team was a professional women's cycling team, based in Thailand that was founded in 2017.

== Team roster ==
As of 16 April 2021.

Rider	Date of birth
Chaniporn Batriya (THA)	12 August 1999 (age 27)
Sarocha Kamonkhon (THA)	15 August 1997 (age 29)
Wilaiwan Kunlapha (THA)	25 December 1987 (age 38)
Chanpeng Nontasin (THA)	9 October 1984 (age 41)

Rider	Date of birth
Supaksorn Nuntana (THA)	8 December 1989 (age 36)
Ayustina Priatna (INA)	12 December 1997 (age 28)
Phetdarin Somrat (THA)	6 June 1995 (age 31)
Apinya Thiangkaew (THA)	9 March 1995 (age 31)

== Major results ==
2017
Overall The Princess Maha Chackri Sirindhon's Cup, Phetdarin Somrat

Best Asian Rider classification, Phetdarin Somrat
Teams classification
Stage 3, Phetdarin Somrat

2019
Overall The Princess Maha Chackri Sirindhon's Cup, Jutatip Maneephan

Best Asian Rider classification, Jutatip Maneephan
Points classification, Jutatip Maneephan
Stages 1 & 3, Jutatip Maneephan

Stage 1 The 60th Anniversary "Thai Cycling Association", Jutatip Maneephan
The 60th Anniversary 'Thai Cycling Association' - The Golden Era Celebration, Jutatip Maneephan

2020
Stage 3 The Princess Maha Chackri Sirindhon's Cup, Supaksorn Nuntana

2022
Overall The Princess Maha Chackri Sirindhon's Cup, Phetdarin Somrat

Stage 2, Phetdarin Somrat

== National Champions ==
2019
Thailand Track (500m Time Trial), Jutatip Maneephan
Thailand Track (Individual Pursuit), Supaksorn Nuntana
Thailand Track (Keirin), Supaksorn Nuntana
Thailand Track (Points race), Chanpeng Nontasin
Thailand Track (Individual Sprint), Jutatip Maneephan

2020
Thailand Time Trial, Phetdarin Somrat
