= Christopher Caluag =

Filipino American BMX racer

Personal information
- Born: December 16, 1988 (age 37) United States

Cycling career
- Sport: Cycling
- Discipline: BMX
- Role: Rider
Medal record
Representing Philippines
Southeast Asian Games
Silver medal – second place	2013 Naypyidaw	Men's BMX

Christopher Caluag (born 16 December 1988) is a Filipino American BMX racer and civil engineer who competes for the Philippines internationally. He won a silver medal at the 2013 Southeast Asian Games and participated at the 2014 Asian Games.

== Early life ==
Caluag was born to Daniel Ramos Caluag and Isabelita Manabat Caluag. Daniel Ramos was a respiratory therapist from Malolos, Bulacan and Isabelita was a registered nurse from Licab, Nueva Ecija. His parents migrated separately and met in California. Daniel Ramos migrated first to Guam at a young age before migrating again to the US mainland. Caluag and his older brother, Daniel were born in the United States.

His brother Daniel resides in with his family in Kentucky. Daniel bikes with Christopher whenever Daniel visits him in California.

== Career ==
Christopher took up BMX following his older brother.
