= Cycling at the 2015 SEA Games =

- Venue: Marina Barrage Route
- Dates: 11–14 June 2015
- Competitors: 66 from 10 nations

Cycling at the 2015 SEA Games was held in Marina Barrage Route, Singapore from 11 to 14 June 2015.

== Participating nations ==
A total of 66 athletes from 10 nations will be competing in cycling at the 2015 Southeast Asian Games:

- Cambodia (7)
- Indonesia (8)
- Laos (4)
- Malaysia (8)
- Myanmar (3)
- Philippines (8)
- Singapore (8)
- Thailand (8)
- Timor-Leste (4)
- Vietnam (8)

== Competition schedule ==
The following is the competition schedule for the cycling competitions:

| F | Final |

| Event↓/Date → | Thu 11 | Fri 12 | Sat 13 | Sun 14 |
|---|---|---|---|---|
| Men's time trial | F | | | |
| Men's criterium | | F | | |
| Men's road race | | | | F |
| Women's time trial | F | | | |
| Women's criterium | | F | | |
| Women's road race | | | F | |

== Medalists ==
=== Men ===
| Event | Gold | Silver | Bronze |
|---|---|---|---|
| Time trial | Robin Manullang; Indonesia | Turakit Boonratanathanakorn; Thailand | Trịnh Đức Tâm; Vietnam |
| Criterium | Harrif Saleh; Malaysia | Lê Văn Duẩn; Vietnam | Vincent Ang; Singapore |
| Road race | Harrif Saleh; Malaysia | Lê Văn Duẩn; Vietnam | Anuar Manan; Malaysia |

=== Women ===
| Event | Gold | Silver | Bronze |
|---|---|---|---|
| Time trial | Marella Salamat; Philippines | Chanpeng Nontasin; Thailand | Dinah Chan; Singapore |
| Criterium | Jutatip Maneephan; Thailand | Nguyễn Thị Thật; Vietnam | Jupha Somnet; Malaysia |
| Road race | Nguyễn Thị Thật; Vietnam | Jutatip Maneephan; Thailand | Nurul Suhada Zainal; Malaysia |

== Medal table ==
* Host nation (Singapore)

| Rank | Nation | Gold | Silver | Bronze | Total |
|---|---|---|---|---|---|
| 1 | Malaysia (MAS) | 2 | 0 | 3 | 5 |
| 2 | Vietnam (VIE) | 1 | 3 | 1 | 5 |
| 3 | Thailand (THA) | 1 | 3 | 0 | 4 |
| 4 | Indonesia (INA) | 1 | 0 | 0 | 1 |
| 4 | Philippines (PHI) | 1 | 0 | 0 | 1 |
| 6 | Singapore (SIN)* | 0 | 0 | 2 | 2 |
| Totals (6 entries) | | 6 | 6 | 6 | 18 |
