= Karina Kasenova =

Russian cyclist

Personal information
- Born: 5 June 1998 (age 28)

Cycling career
- Sport: Cycling
- Discipline: Road
- Role: Rider

Professional team
- 2018–2019: Cogeas

Karina Kasenova (born 5 June 1998) is a Russian professional racing cyclist, who last rode for the UCI Women's Team Cogeas–Mettler–Look during the 2019 women's road cycling season.
