= Chaniporn Batriya =

Thai cyclist (born 1999)

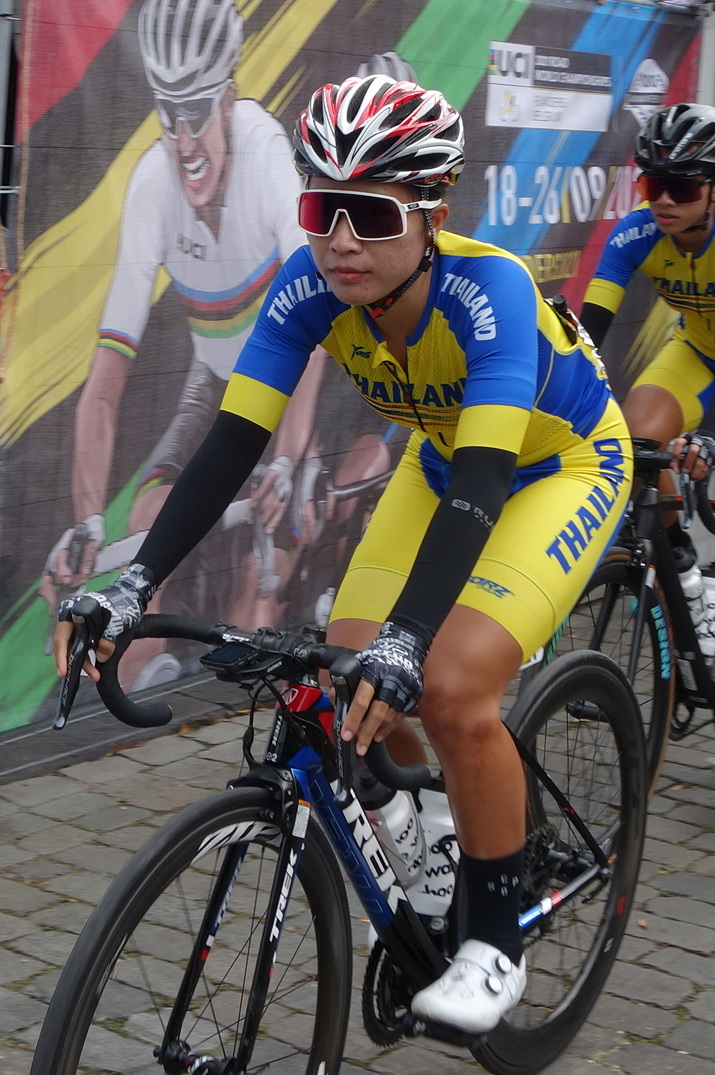
- Batriya at the 2021 World Championships

Personal information
- Full name: Chaniporn Batriya
- Born: 12 August 1999 (age 27)

Cycling career
- Sport: Cycling
- Current team: Thailand Women's Cycling Team
- Discipline: Road
- Role: Rider

Professional team
- 2018–: Thailand Women's Cycling Team

Chaniporn Batriya (born 12 August 1999) is a Thai professional racing cyclist, who currently rides for UCI Women's Continental Team Thailand Women's Cycling Team.
