= Toni Syarifudin =

Indonesian professional BMX racer

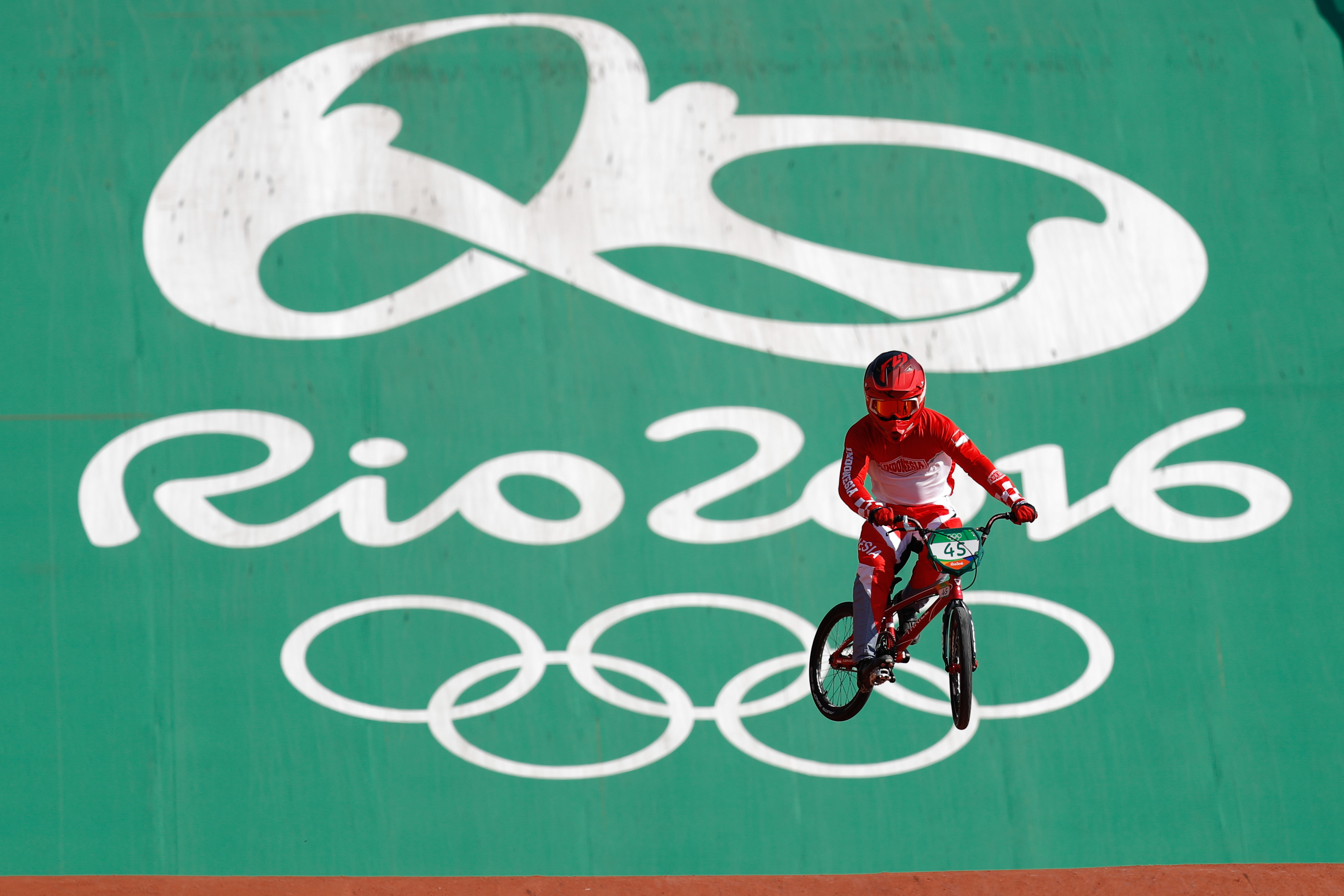
- Syarifudin at the 2016 Summer Olympics

Personal information
- Nationality: Indonesian
- Born: 13 June 1991 (age 35) Surakarta, Central Java, Indonesia
- Height: 1.64 m (5 ft 5 in)
- Weight: 68 kg (150 lb)

Sport
- Country: Indonesia
- Sport: Cycling
- Event: BMX
Medal record
Representing Indonesia
SEA Games
Silver medal – second place	2011 Indonesia	BMX cross
Silver medal – second place	2019 Philippines	BMX time trial

Toni Syarifudin (born 13 June 1991) is an Indonesian professional BMX racer. He has won silver at the 2011 Southeast Asian Games in Jakarta. Syarifudin also represented Indonesia at the 2016 Summer Olympics in the men's BMX event, being the first Indonesian to compete in the category.

== 2016 Summer Olympics ==
Syarifudin qualified for the men's BMX category in the 2016 Summer Olympics, being the first Indonesian to compete in the discipline. During the heats, he crashed and injured himself during the second run, causing a dislocated shoulder and a torn ligament. He did not start the third run, and finished seventh overall in the second heat. He did not advance to the semi-finals.
