= Supaksorn Nuntana =

Thai cyclist (born 1989)

Personal information
- Full name: Supaksorn Nuntana
- Born: 8 December 1989 (age 36)

Cycling career
- Sport: Cycling
- Current team: Thailand Women's Cycling Team
- Disciplines: Road; Track
- Role: Rider

Professional team
- 2017–: Thailand Women's Cycling Team

Supaksorn Nuntana (born 8 December 1989) is a Thai racing cyclist, who currently rides for UCI Women's Continental Team Thailand Women's Cycling Team. She competed in the 2013 UCI women's road race in Florence.

== Major results ==
2015
Track Clubs ACC Cup

1st Individual pursuit
2nd Points race

3rd Individual pursuit, Asian Track Championships
Track Asia Cup

3rd Keirin
3rd Team sprint (with Pannaray Rasee)

2016
2nd Individual pursuit, Track Clubs ACC Cup
