= Tomoya Kano =

Japanese bicycle racer (born 1973)

Personal information
- Born: 14 July 1973 (age 53) Osaka, Japan

Cycling career
- Sport: Cycling
- Current team: Matrix Powertag
- Discipline: Road
- Role: Rider

Amateur teams
- 1997: Nippon Hodo Racing Team
- 2017–2018: Gunma–Grifin Racing Team

Professional teams
- 1999–2004: Shimano Racing
- 2005–2008: Shimano–Memory Corp
- 2009: Shimano Racing Team
- 2010–2011: Bridgestone–Anchor
- 2012–2014: Team UKYO
- 2015–2016: Gunma–Grifin Racing Team
- 2020–: Matrix Powertag

Tomoya Kano (狩野 智也, Kanō Tomoya; born 14 July 1973) is a Japanese cyclist, who currently rides for UCI Continental team Matrix Powertag. He previously rode for Skil–Shimano between 2005 and 2008, where he competed in several major European races including the 2006 Tour of Flanders, the 2006 E3 Prijs Vlaanderen and the 2005 Amstel Gold Race.

== Major results ==
1999
3rd Time trial, National Road Championships
2000
8th Tour de Okinawa
2001
2nd Overall Tour de Hokkaido
2nd Overall Tour de Korea
3rd Road race, National Road Championships
4th Time trial, Asian Road Championships
7th Overall Tour of Japan
2002
2nd Time trial, National Road Championships
2nd Overall Tour de Hokkaido
5th Tour de Okinawa
2003
2nd Overall Tour de Hokkaido
2004
5th Overall Tour of Japan
9th Tour de Okinawa
10th Japan Cup Cycle Road Race
2005
3rd Time trial, National Road Championships
6th Overall Tour of Japan
2006
1st Overall Tour de Kumano
4th Overall Tour of Japan
2007
3rd Time trial, National Road Championships
7th Overall Tour of East Java
7th Overall Tour de Hokkaido
2008
3rd Time trial, National Road Championships
7th Overall Tour of East Java
2010
8th Overall Tour de Hokkaido
8th Overall Tour of Japan
8th Overall Tour de Martinique
9th Overall Tour de Kumano
2011
6th Overall Tour de Martinique
2013
9th Overall Tour of East Java
