= Ken Hashikawa =

Japanese road cyclist (born 1970)

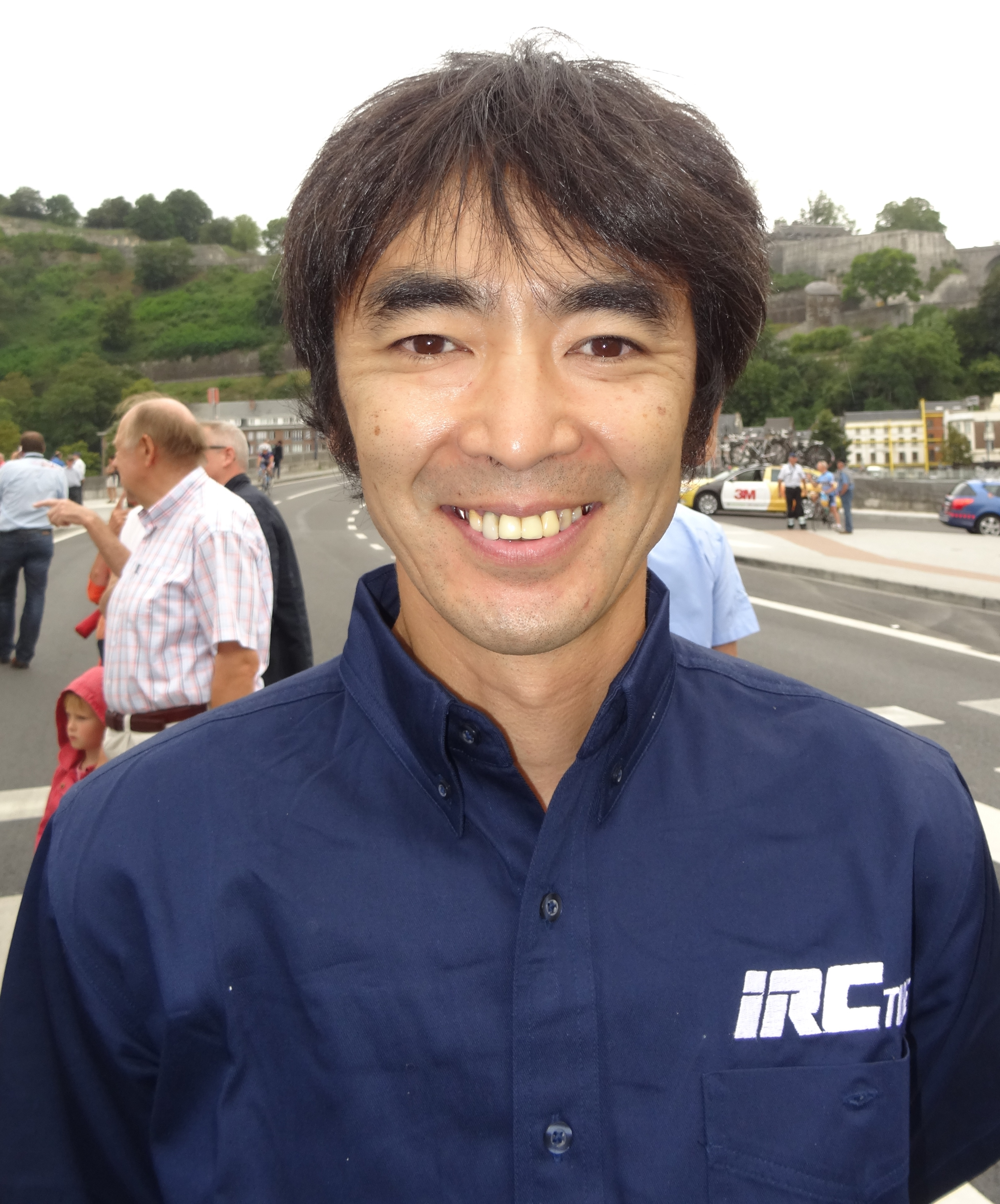
- Hashikawa in 2014

Personal information
- Full name: Ken Hashikawa; Japanese: 橋川 健
- Born: May 8, 1970 (age 56) Tokyo, Japan

Cycling career
- Sport: Cycling
- Current team: Team Eurasia
- Discipline: Road
- Role: Rider (retired); Directeur sportif

Professional teams
- 1994–1998: Saxon–Selle Italia
- 2003: Bridgestone–Anchor
- 2005: Kinan CCD
- 2006–2008: Matrix

Managerial teams
- 2010: Nippo
- 2012–2014: Team Nippo
- 2015: CCT p/b Champion System
- 2015–: Team Eurasia

Ken Hashikawa (橋川 健, Hashikawa Ken; born 8 May 1970) is a Japanese former road cyclist. He is currently the manager for the developmental team Team Eurasia.

== Major results ==
1993
3rd Grand Prix Waregem
1994
6th Japan Cup Cycle Road Race
1995
1st Road race, National Road Championships
1996
1st Tour de Okinawa
1998
5th Road race, National Road Championships
1999
1st Overall Tour de Hokkaido

1st Stage 3

2000
2nd Overall Tour de Hokkaido

1st Stage 2

5th Japan Cup Cycle Road Race
2001
3rd Time trial, National Road Championships
4th Overall Tour of Japan
2002
3rd Grand Prix Criquielion
2003
3rd Time trial, National Road Championships
2004
7th Tour de Okinawa
2005
4th Tour de Okinawa
2006
4th Time trial, National Road Championships
8th Tour de Okinawa
2008
5th Time trial, National Road Championships
