= Yukiya Arashiro =

Japanese road cyclist

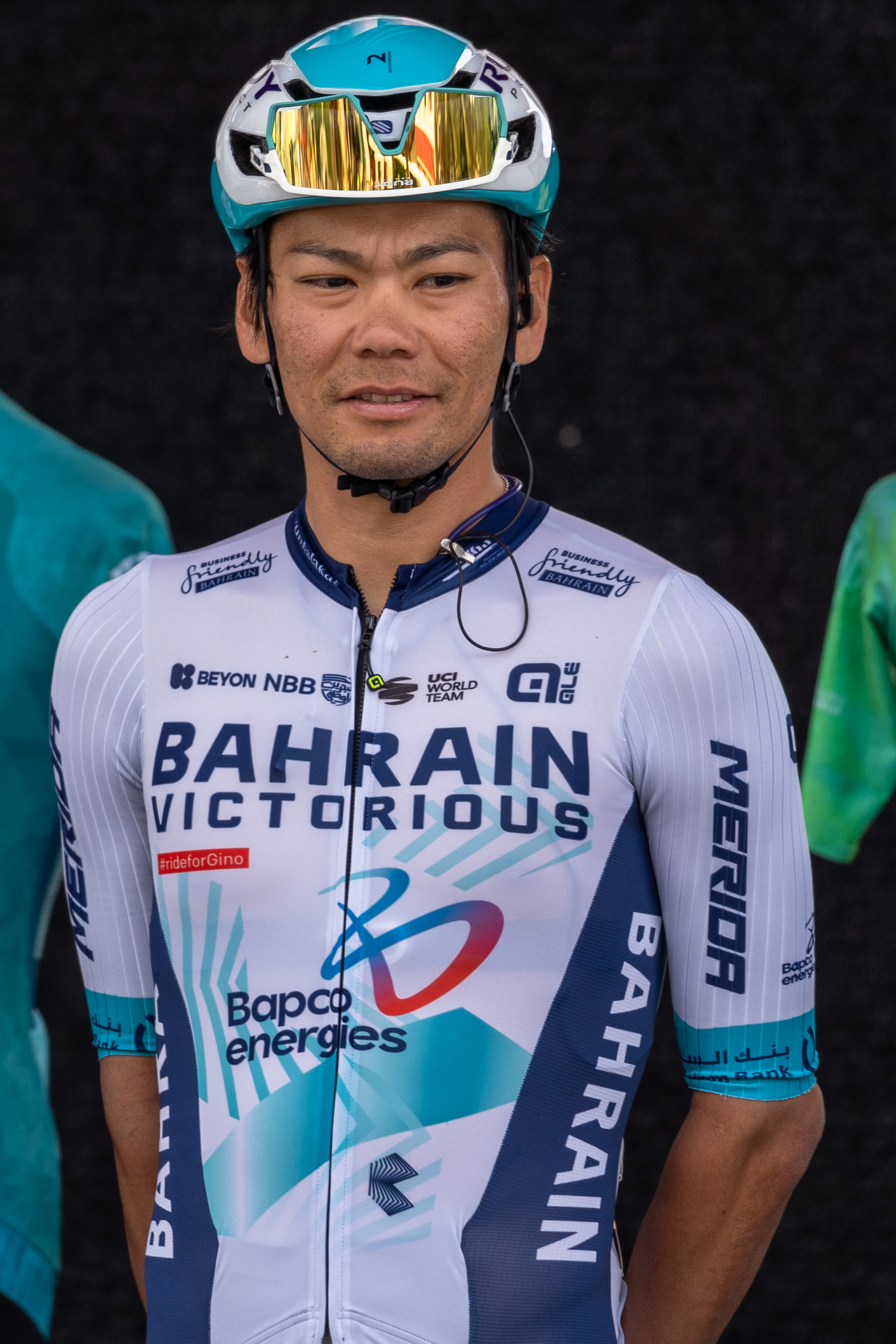
- Arashiro in 2024

Personal information
- Full name: Yukiya Arashiro
- Born: 22 September 1984 (age 42) Ishigaki, Okinawa, Japan
- Height: 1.70 m (5 ft 7 in)
- Weight: 65 kg (143 lb)

Cycling career
- Sport: Cycling
- Current team: Solution Tech NIPPO Rali
- Disciplines: Road; Track
- Role: Rider
- Rider type: All-rounder

Professional teams
- 2006: Cycle Racing Team Vang
- 2007: Nippo Corporation
- 2008: Meitan Hompo-GDR
- 2009–2015: Bbox Bouygues Telecom
- 2016: Lampre–Merida
- 2017–2024: Bahrain–Merida
- 2025–: Team Solution Tech–Vini Fantini

Major wins
- One-day races and Classics Asian Road Race Championships (2011) National Road Race Championships (2007, 2013, 2022)
Medal record
Representing Japan
Men's road bicycle racing
Asian Championships
Gold medal – first place	2011 Nakhon Ratchasima	Road race
Silver medal – second place	2016 Izu	Road race
Silver medal – second place	2025 Phitsanulok	Mixed team relay
Bronze medal – third place	2008 Nara	Time trial
Bronze medal – third place	2023 Rayong	Road race
Bronze medal – third place	2024 Almaty	Time trial

Yukiya Arashiro (新城幸也, Arashiro Yukiya; born 22 September 1984) is a Japanese road bicycle racer, who currently rides for UCI ProTeam Solution Tech NIPPO Rali.

== Career ==
Born in Ishigaki, Okinawa Prefecture, Arashiro was the Japanese Under-23 National Time Trial and Road Race Champion in 2005. He has also won the Japanese National Road Race Championships three times, in 2007, 2013 and 2022.

In 2009 he was selected by his team to ride the Tour de France. Along with Fumiyuki Beppu, he was the first Japanese national to complete that race, as on prior occasions Kisso Kawamuro and Daisuke Imanaka had started, but not finished, the race. By finishing the 2010 Giro d'Italia, he became the first Japanese person to finish two Grand Tour events. He recorded a third-place stage finish on the fifth stage, behind breakaway companions Jérôme Pineau and Julien Fouchard. He completed his third Tour de France in 2012 in 84th place—the highest placing of a Japanese person at that time—and earned the most combative award on Stage 4. He participated in the men's road race at the 2012 Summer Olympics and finished in 48th place. A few weeks after the Olympics, he became the first Japanese to win a race categorized as HC by the UCI, the Tour du Limousin of the Palais des Sports de Beaublanc in Limoges. Competing in the 2015 Vuelta a España, he became the first Japanese person to finish the three Grand Tours. He took part three further times in the Olympic road race, coming 27th (2016), 35th (2021), and 56th (2024).

Arashiro has completed all sixteen Grand Tours that he has started, with a best finish of 65th at the 2014 Tour de France and the 2015 Vuelta a España.

== Major results ==
2005
National Under-23 Road Championships

1st Time trial
1st Road race

9th Tour de Okinawa
2006
3rd Overall Tour du Limousin
3rd Tour de Okinawa
2007
1st Road race, National Road Championships
1st Stage 7 Tour of Japan
2nd Overall Vuelta Ciclista a León

1st Mountains classification

2nd Tour du Jura
3rd Overall Tour de Hokkaido

1st Stage 4

3rd Tour de Okinawa
5th Japan Cup
7th Tour du Finistère
2008
1st Overall Tour de Okinawa

1st Stages 1 & 2

Asian Road Championships

3rd Time trial
10th Road race

3rd Overall Tour du Limousin

1st Stage 2

3rd Overall Tour de Kumano

1st Stage 2

5th Overall Tour of Japan
7th Overall Les 3 Jours de Vaucluse
7th Overall Tour de Bretagne
2009
9th Overall Four Days of Dunkirk
10th Trophée des Grimpeurs
10th Grand Prix de Denain
2010
1st Critérium cycliste international de Quillan
5th Paris–Tours
7th Grand Prix de la Somme
9th Road race, UCI Road World Championships
9th Val d'Ille Classic
9th Japan Cup
2011
Asian Road Championships

1st Road race
4th Time trial

2nd Road race, National Road Championships
5th Overall Paris–Corrèze
10th Overall Tour du Limousin
2012
1st Overall Tour du Limousin
Combativity award Stage 4 Tour de France
2013
1st Road race, National Road Championships
2nd Overall Tour du Limousin
2014
10th Amstel Gold Race
2015
3rd Japan Cup
5th Paris–Camembert
6th Cholet-Pays de Loire
10th Road race, Asian Road Championships
2016
1st Stage 7 Tour of Japan
2nd Road race, Asian Road Championships
9th Japan Cup
Combativity award Stage 6 Tour de France
2017
Asian Road Championships

2nd Team time trial
7th Road race

3rd Hong Kong Challenge
2018
Asian Road Championships

1st Team time trial
5th Road race

1st Overall Tour de Taiwan
2019
2nd Road race, National Road Championships
2022
National Road Championships

1st Road race
3rd Time trial

2023
3rd Road race, Asian Road Championships
3rd Time trial, National Road Championships
2024
3rd Time trial, National Road Championships

=== Grand Tour general classification results timeline ===
Grand Tour	2009	2010	2011	2012	2013	2014	2015	2016	2017	2018	2019	2020	2021	2022	2023
Giro d'Italia	—	93	—	—	—	127	—	—	—	—	—	89	77	—	123
Tour de France	129	112	—	84	99	65	—	116	109	—	—	—	—	—	
/ Vuelta a España	—	—	—	—	—	—	65	106	—	—	110	—	116	—	
