= Damien Monier =

French road bicycle racer

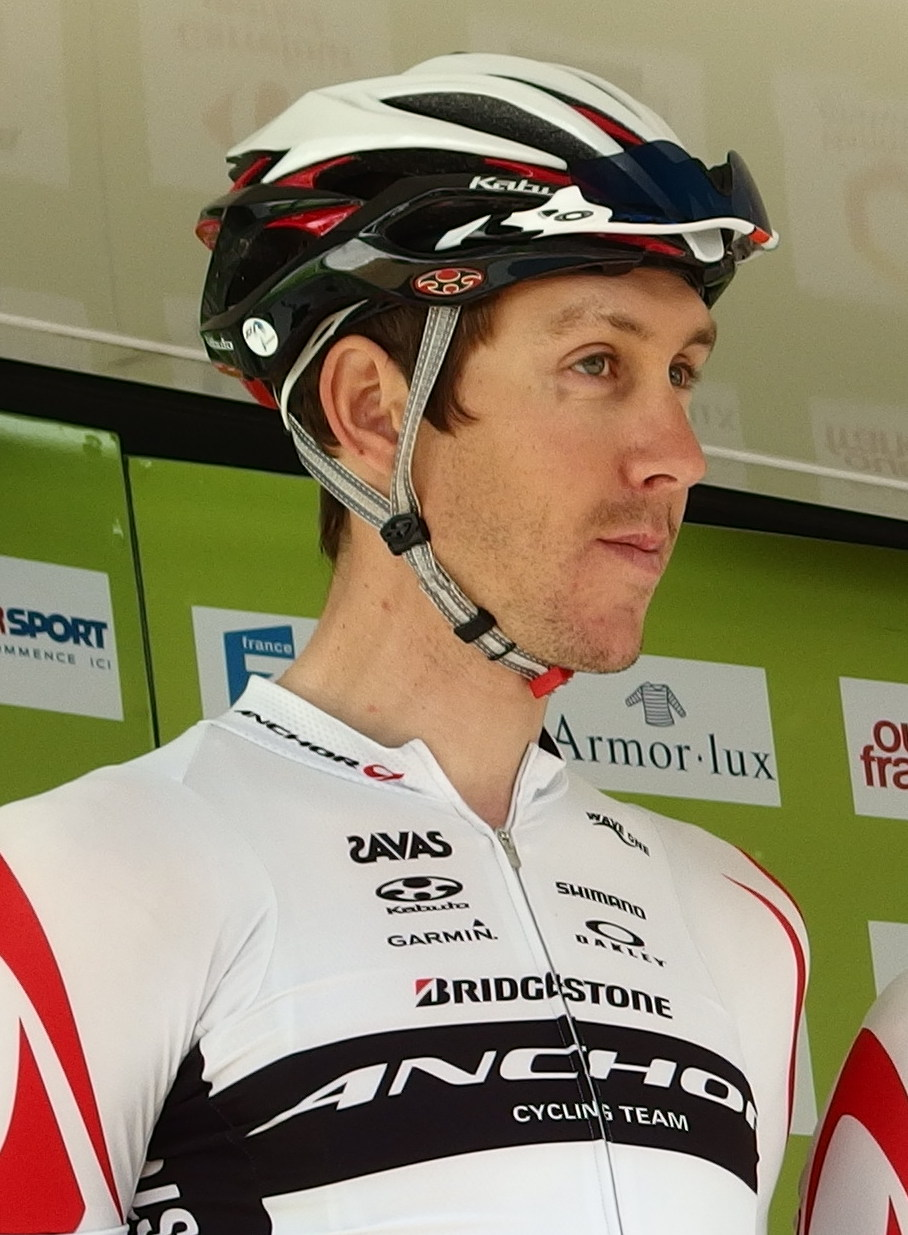
- Monier in April 2015

Personal information
- Full name: Damien Monier
- Born: August 27, 1982 (age 44) Clermont-Ferrand, France
- Height: 1.88 m (6 ft 2 in)
- Weight: 71 kg (157 lb)

Cycling career
- Sport: Cycling
- Current team: Retired
- Discipline: Road
- Role: Staff

Amateur team
- 2003: Cofidis (stagiaire)

Professional teams
- 2004–2012: Cofidis
- 2013–2017: Bridgestone–Anchor
- 2018–2022: Aisan Racing Team

Major wins
- Grand Tours Giro d'Italia 1 individual stage (2010)

Damien Monier (born 27 August 1982) is a French former professional road bicycle racer, who competed as a professional from 2004 to 2022.

== Career ==
Monier was born in Clermont-Ferrand, and became a professional rider in 2004. After seven years with the Cofidis team, he won his first race, the 17th stage of the 2010 Giro d'Italia from Bruneck to Peio. In January 2012, he was hit by a car while training in France, knocking him unconscious and fracturing his skull. In November 2012, he signed to ride the 2013 season with the Japanese team Bridgestone–Anchor. He moved to Aisan Racing Team for the 2018 season.

After retiring as a professional cyclist, he is working as a staff of Aisan Racing.

== Major results ==
2002
1st Time trial, National Under-23 Road Championships
2003
1st Individual pursuit, National Under-23 Track Championships
3rd Time trial, National Under-23 Road Championships
2004
3rd Individual pursuit, National Track Championships
2005
1st Individual pursuit, National Track Championships
2007
8th Tour de Vendée
2008
1st Individual pursuit, National Track Championships
7th Overall Volta ao Distrito de Santarém
2009
4th Overall Tour Méditerranéen
4th Overall Tour de l'Ain
8th Overall Étoile de Bessèges
9th Overall Circuit de la Sarthe
2010
1st Stage 17 Giro d'Italia
8th Overall Route du Sud
9th Classic Loire Atlantique
2013
1st JBCF Tsugaike Kogen Hillclimb
2nd Overall Tour de Hokkaido
3rd Overall Tour of Japan
4th Overall Tour of Azerbaijan (Iran)
6th Overall Tour de Guadeloupe
9th Overall Tour de Kumano
2014
2nd Overall Tour de Guadeloupe
4th Critérium International de Sétif
5th Overall Tour International de Sétif
7th Overall Tour de Constantine

1st Stage 3

2015
1st Taiwan KOM Challenge
3rd Overall Tour de Filipinas
3rd Overall Tour de Kumano
4th Tour de Okinawa
8th Overall Tour of Japan
10th Overall Tour de Korea
2016
1st Overall Tour de Guadeloupe

1st Stage 8b (ITT)

2017
Tour de Kumano

1st Points classification
1st Stage 3

5th Overall Tour de Korea
2018
3rd Taiwan KOM Challenge
2019
9th Overall Tour de Ijen

=== Grand Tour general classification results timeline ===
Grand Tour	2007	2008	2009	2010
Giro d'Italia	—	111	—	89
Tour de France	—	—	—	71
Vuelta a España	129	—	65	—
