= Yuhi Todome =

Japanese cyclist (born 2002)

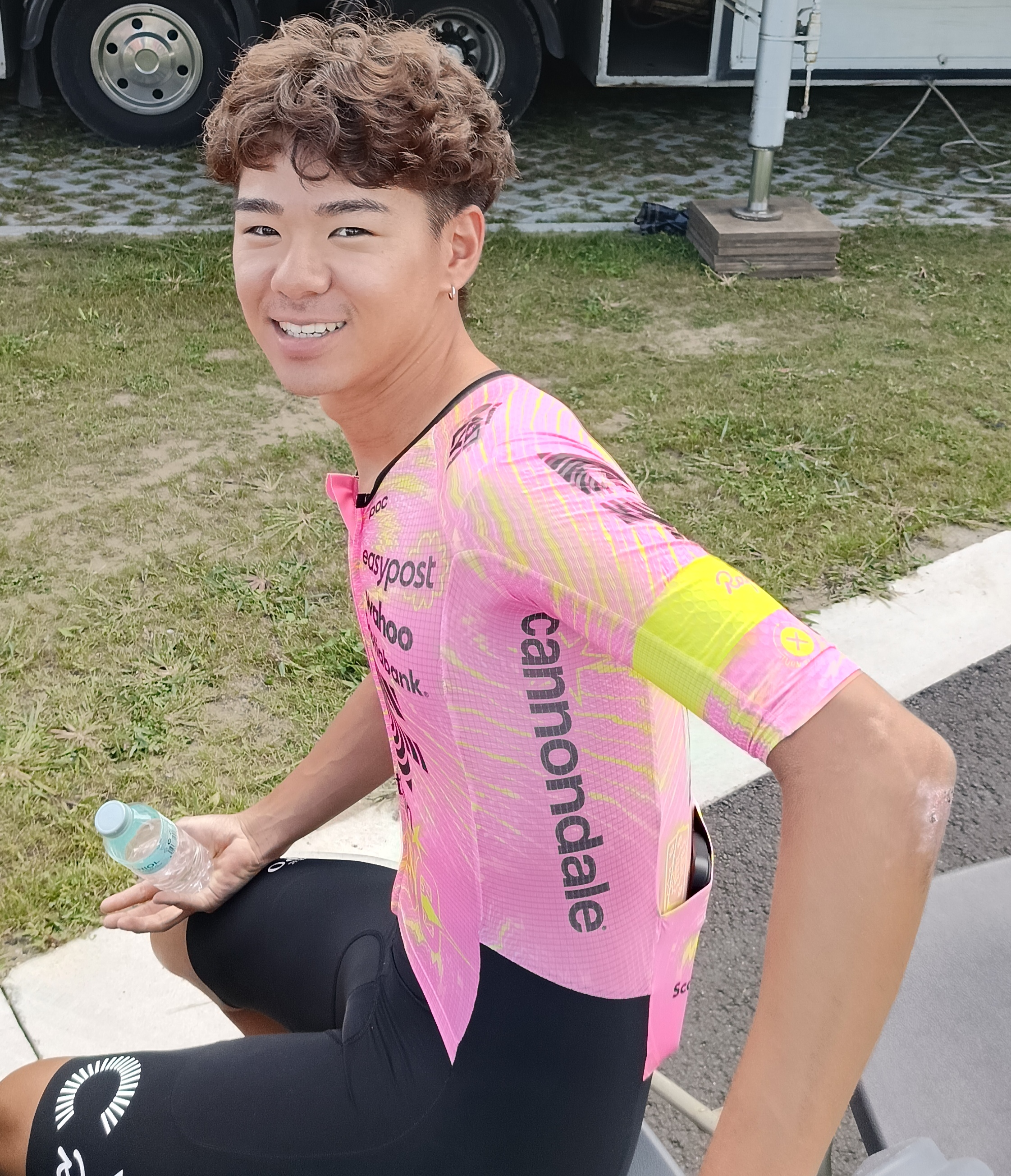
- Todome in 2024

Personal information
- Born: 18 June 2002 (age 24)
- Height: 1.76 m (5 ft 9 in)

Cycling career
- Sport: Cycling
- Current team: Aisan Racing Team
- Discipline: Road
- Role: Rider

Amateur teams
- 2020–2021: EQADS
- 2022: Gunma–Grifin Racing Team

Professional teams
- 2022–2023: EF Education–Nippo Development Team
- 2024–2025: EF Education–EasyPost
- 2026: Aisan Racing Team

Yuhi Todome (born 18 June 2002) is a Japanese cyclist who currently rides for UCI Continental team Aisan Racing Team.

== Major results ==
2019
3rd Time trial, National Junior Road Championships
2021
2nd Time trial, National Under-23 Road Championships
10th Overall Tour of Japan

1st Young rider classification

2022
1st Time trial, National Under-23 Road Championships
1st Mountains classification, Tour de Hokkaido
2023
5th Time trial, National Road Championships
8th Grand Prix Aspendos
10th Oita Urban Classic
2026
1st Road Race, National Road Championships
3rd Road Race, Asian Games
10th Overall Tour of Japan
