= Fumiyuki Beppu =

Japanese road bicycle racer

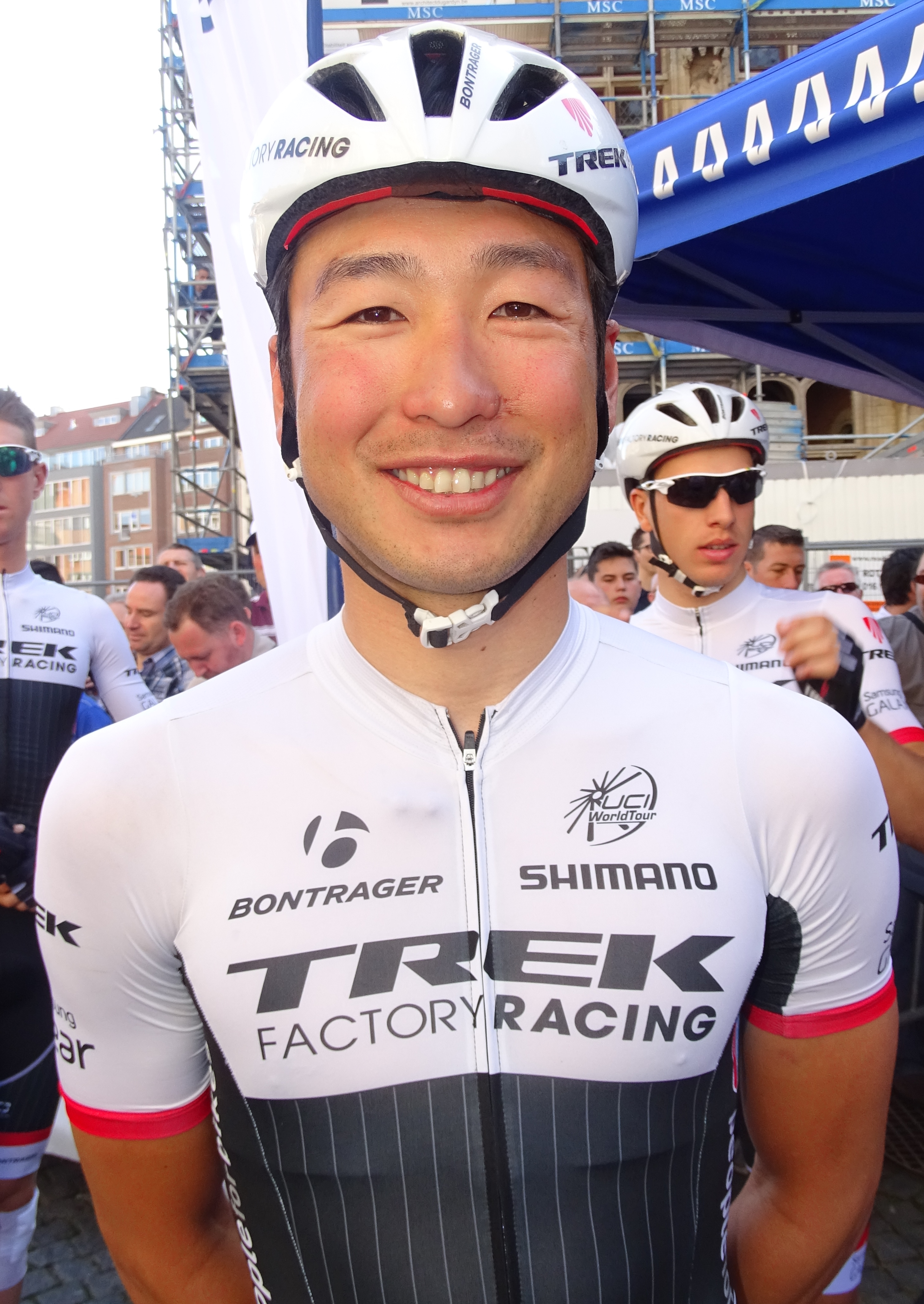
- Beppu at the 2015 Brabantse Pijl

Personal information
- Full name: Fumiyuki Beppu; Japanese: 別府史之
- Nickname: Fumy
- Born: 10 April 1983 (age 43) Chigasaki, Kanagawa, Japan
- Height: 1.80 m (5 ft 11 in)
- Weight: 67 kg (148 lb; 10.6 st)

Cycling career
- Sport: Cycling
- Current team: Retired
- Discipline: Road
- Role: Rider
- Rider type: All-rounder; Classics rider

Amateur teams
- 2001–2002: Bridgestone–Anchor
- 2003–2004: Vélo-Club La Pomme Marseille

Professional teams
- 2005–2007: Discovery Channel
- 2008–2009: Skil–Shimano
- 2010–2011: Team RadioShack
- 2012–2013: GreenEDGE
- 2014–2019: Trek Factory Racing
- 2020: Nippo–Delko–One Provence
- 2021: EF Education–Nippo

Major wins
- One-day races and Classics Asian Road Race Chiampionships (2008) National Road Race Championships (2006, 2011) National Time Trial Championships (2006, 2011, 2014)
Medal record
Representing Japan
Men's road bicycle racing
Asian Championships
Gold medal – first place	2008 Nara	Road race
Bronze medal – third place	2016 Izu	Road race
Silver medal – second place	2018 Naypyidaw	Road race
Gold medal – first place	2018 Naypyidaw	Team time trial

Fumiyuki Beppu (Japanese: 別府史之; born 10 April 1983) is a Japanese former professional road bicycle racer, who last rode for UCI WorldTeam EF Education–Nippo. His older brother is the cyclist Takumi Beppu.

== Career ==
=== Team Discovery (2005–2007) ===
Beppu turned professional with Discovery Channel in 2005, and stayed with them until 2007.

In June 2006, Beppu was crowned the Japanese national champion in both the time trial and the road race.

On 28 September 2007, the Skil–Shimano professional cycling team announced that they had signed Beppu for an initial one-year contract.

=== Skil-Shimano (2008–2009) ===
On 26 July 2009, Beppu, riding for Skil–Shimano, finished 112th out of 180 riders in the Tour de France. He won the Combativity award in the final 21st flat stage from Montereau-Fault-Yonne to Paris Champs-Élysées. He also placed 8th in stage 3 and 7th in stage 19. Along with Yukiya Arashiro, he became the first Japanese national to complete that race. Kisso Kawamuro and Daisuke Imanaka had started but not finished the race before.

=== RadioShack (2010–2011) ===
On 23 November 2009, it was announced Beppu had signed to ride with Team RadioShack for the 2010 season. Later it became clear that Beppu still had one year left on his contract with Skil-Shimano, so he had to buy himself out of the contract. In February 2010 he finally started races with RadioShack at Omloop Het Nieuwsblad and Kuurne-Bruxelles-Kuurne.

=== GreenEdge (2012–2013) ===
In October 2011, it was announced that Beppu would ride for the new Australian based team GreenEDGE. He participated in the men's road race at the 2012 Summer Olympics and finished in 22nd place. After two years with the team, Beppu left at the end of the 2013 season to join Trek Factory Racing.

=== Trek Factory Racing (2014–2019) ===
He was named in the startlist for the 2016 Vuelta a España.

== Major results ==
2000
1st Time trial, National Junior Road Championships
2001
1st Road race, Asian Junior Road Championships
1st Road race, National Junior Road Championships
2003
1st Road race, National Under-23 Road Championships
1st Stage 1 Giro della Valle d'Aosta Mont Blanc
2004
1st Stage 1 Giro della Valle d'Aosta Mont Blanc
1st Mountains classification Ronde de l'Isard
3rd Overall Tour du Loir-et-Cher
2006
National Road Championships

1st Road race
1st Time trial

Asian Games

4th Time trial
9th Road race

2007
10th Overall Driedaagse van West-Vlaanderen
2008
1st Road race, Asian Road Championships
2009
1st Mountains classification Route du Sud
Combativity award Stage 21 Tour de France
2010
4th Châteauroux Classic
10th Overall Driedaagse van West-Vlaanderen
2011
National Road Championships

1st Road race
1st Time trial

6th Grand Prix d'Isbergues
8th GP Ouest–France
2012
1st Stage 2 (TTT) Eneco Tour
2nd Japan Cup Criterium
2013
5th Japan Cup Criterium
2014
1st Time trial, National Road Championships
4th Time trial, Asian Games
2015
1st Japan Cup Criterium
2016
1st Japan Cup Criterium
3rd Road race, Asian Road Championships
Combativity award Stage 18 Vuelta a España
2017
2nd Road race, National Road Championships
4th Road race, Asian Road Championships
2018
Asian Road Championships

1st Team time trial
2nd Road race
4th Time trial

Asian Games

2nd Road race
3rd Time trial

2019
3rd Time trial, National Road Championships

=== Grand Tour general classification results timeline ===
Grand Tour	2009	2010	2011	2012	2013	2014	2015	2016
Giro d'Italia	—	—	66	121	—	82	117	—
Tour de France	109	—	—	—	—	—	—	—
Vuelta a España	—	—	—	—	—	—	—	120
