= Thomas Lebas =

French bicycle racer

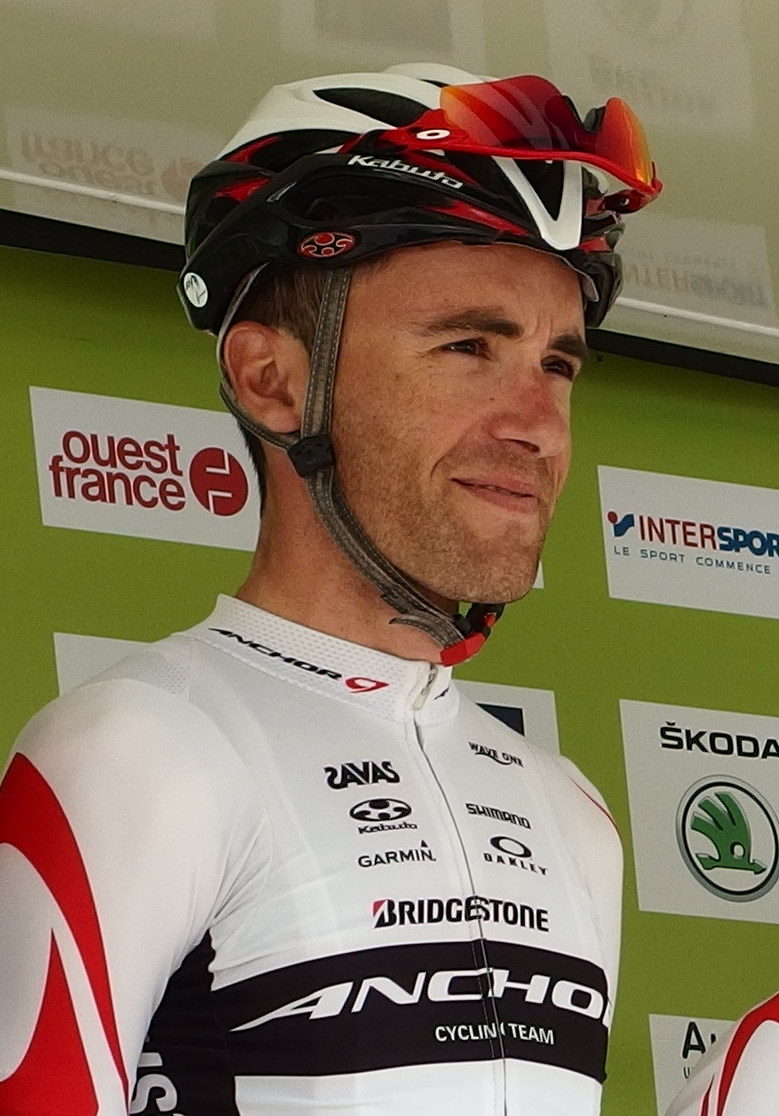
- Lebas at the 2015 Tour de Bretagne

Personal information
- Full name: Thomas Lebas
- Born: 14 December 1985 (age 40) Pau, France
- Height: 1.82 m (6 ft 0 in)
- Weight: 65 kg (143 lb)

Cycling career
- Sport: Cycling
- Current team: Kinan Racing Team
- Discipline: Road
- Role: Rider

Amateur teams
- 2004–2007: Entente Sud Gascogne
- 2008–2011: AVC Aix-en-Provence

Professional teams
- 2008: Cofidis (stagiaire)
- 2012–2016: Bridgestone–Anchor
- 2017–: Kinan Cycling Team

Thomas Lebas (born 14 December 1985) is a French cyclist, who currently rides for UCI Continental team Kinan Racing Team. Prior to joining them, Lebas competed with Bridgestone–Anchor for five seasons.

== Major results ==
2007
8th Overall Tour des Pyrénées
2008
9th Overall Tour de Gironde
2011
4th Overall Giro della Regione Friuli Venezia Giulia
6th Overall Mi-Août en Bretagne
6th Overall Tour de Serbie
8th Overall Circuit des Ardennes
2012
3rd Overall Tour de Kumano
4th Overall Tour of Japan
9th Overall Tour of Oman
2013
1st Overall Tour de Hokkaido

1st Points classification
1st Stage 2

4th Overall Tour of Japan
6th Overall Tour de Kumano
2014
1st Overall Tour International de Sétif

1st Mountains classification

2nd Overall Tour de Constantine

1st Stage 2

5th Overall Tour of Japan
5th Circuit d'Alger
8th Overall Tour de Kumano
9th Overall Tour de Guadeloupe

1st Stage 4

2015
1st Overall Tour de Filipinas
Tour de Guadeloupe

1st Prologue (TTT) & Stage 6

6th Overall Tour of Japan
9th Overall Tour de Kumano
2016
1st Mountains classification Tour d'Azerbaïdjan
3rd Overall Tour de Kumano
7th Overall Tour de Guadeloupe
9th Overall Tour of Japan
10th Overall Tour de Hokkaido
2017
1st Overall Tour de Flores

1st Stage 6

4th Overall Tour de Molvccas
5th Overall Tour de Hokkaido
5th Japan Cup
6th Overall Tour de Lombok
7th Overall Tour de Korea
8th Overall Tour de Kumano

1st Stage 2

8th Overall Tour de Filipinas
10th Overall Tour of Iran (Azerbaijan)
2018
2nd Overall Sharjah International Cycling Tour
3rd Overall Tour of Japan

1st Stage 5

3rd Overall Tour of Thailand
3rd Overall Tour de Ijen
7th Oita Urban Classic
8th Overall Tour de Langkawi
2019
1st Overall Tour de Indonesia

1st Mountains classification

1st Stage 2 Tour de Kumano
3rd Overall Tour of Thailand
4th Overall Tour de Ijen

1st Mountains classification
1st Stage 4

5th Overall New Zealand Cycle Classic
8th Overall Tour of Peninsular
2020
8th Overall New Zealand Cycle Classic
8th Overall Herald Sun Tour
2021
2nd Overall Tour of Japan
8th Oita Urban Classic
2022
2nd Overall Tour de Hokkaido
3rd Overall Tour of Japan
3rd Hiroshima Road Race
7th Overall Tour de Taiwan
8th Japan Cup
2023
3rd Mine Akiyoshi-dai Karst International Road Race
8th Overall Tour of Japan
10th Tour de Okinawa
2024
7th Overall Tour of Mersin
7th Overall Tour de Ijen
8th Overall Tour of Routhe Salvation
2025
9th Tour de Okinawa
