= Ryota Nishizono =

Japanese cyclist

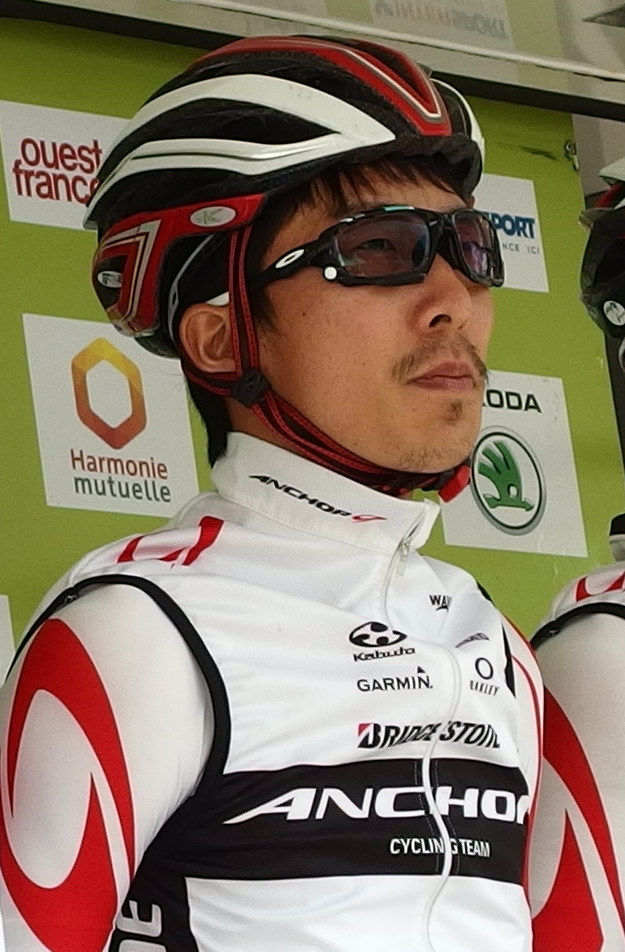
- Nishizono at the 2015 Tour de Bretagne

Personal information
- Full name: Ryota Nishizono; Japanese: 西薗 良太
- Born: 1 September 1987 (age 39) Kirishima, Kagoshima, Japan
- Height: 1.70 m (5 ft 7 in)
- Weight: 62 kg (137 lb; 9.8 st)

Cycling career
- Sport: Cycling
- Discipline: Road
- Role: Rider

Professional teams
- 2011: Shimano Racing Team
- 2012: Bridgestone–Anchor
- 2013: Champion System
- 2015–2017: Bridgestone–Anchor

Major wins
- One-day races and Classics National Time Trial Championships (2012, 2016, 2017)

Ryota Nishizono (西薗 良太, Nishizono Ryōta; born 1 September 1987) is a Japanese former professional racing cyclist.

== Career ==
Born in Kirishima, Kagoshima, Nishizono attended Tokyo University, Japan's most elite university. While there in 2009, he won the Inter-College Championships. After graduation, he first joined Shimano Racing Team, for which he won the first stage of the Tour de Hokkaido in 2011. He moved to Bridgestone–Anchor in 2012 and won the men's time trial at the Japanese National Road Race Championships. For the 2013 season, he signed with UCI Professional Continental team Champion System.

In December 2013, Nishizono announced his retirement as a professional cyclist. He came out of retirement to join Bridgestone–Anchor for the 2015 season. In 2016 he regained his national time trial title. In 2017 he announced to retire again by the end of season.

== Major results ==
2011
National Road Championships

3rd Time trial
4th Road race

8th Overall Tour de Hokkaido

1st Stage 1

2012
1st Time trial, National Road Championships
2nd Overall Tour de Hokkaido
2013
2nd Time trial, National Road Championships
6th Overall Tour of Japan
2015
3rd Time trial, National Road Championships
5th Overall Tour de Hokkaido
2016
National Road Championships

1st Time trial
2nd Road race

7th Tour de Okinawa
2017
1st Time trial, National Road Championships
Asian Road Championships

2nd Team time trial
7th Individual time trial

2nd Overall Tour de Hokkaido
4th Overall Tour de Kumano
