= Hiroshi Tsubaki =

Japanese cyclist

Personal information
- Full name: Hiroshi Tsubaki
- Born: 18 May 1991 (age 35) Tokyo, Japan
- Height: 1.73 m (5 ft 8 in)
- Weight: 62 kg (137 lb)

Cycling career
- Sport: Cycling
- Current team: Retired
- Discipline: Road
- Role: Rider

Amateur teams
- 2010–2012: Bridgestone–Anchor U23
- 2013: EQA U23
- 2013: Bridgestone–Anchor (stagiaire)

Professional teams
- 2014–2016: Bridgestone–Anchor
- 2017–2020: Kinan Cycling Team

Hiroshi Tsubaki (born 18 May 1991) is a Japanese former professional cyclist, who rode professionally between 2014 and 2020 for Bridgestone–Anchor and the Kinan Cycling Team. Since retiring from cycling, Tsubaki now works as a barista in a coffee shop in Inagi.

== Major results ==
2010
1st Time trial, National Under-23 Road Championships
2017
Tour de Molvccas

1st Stages 4 & 5
