= Taiji Nishitani =

Japanese cyclist

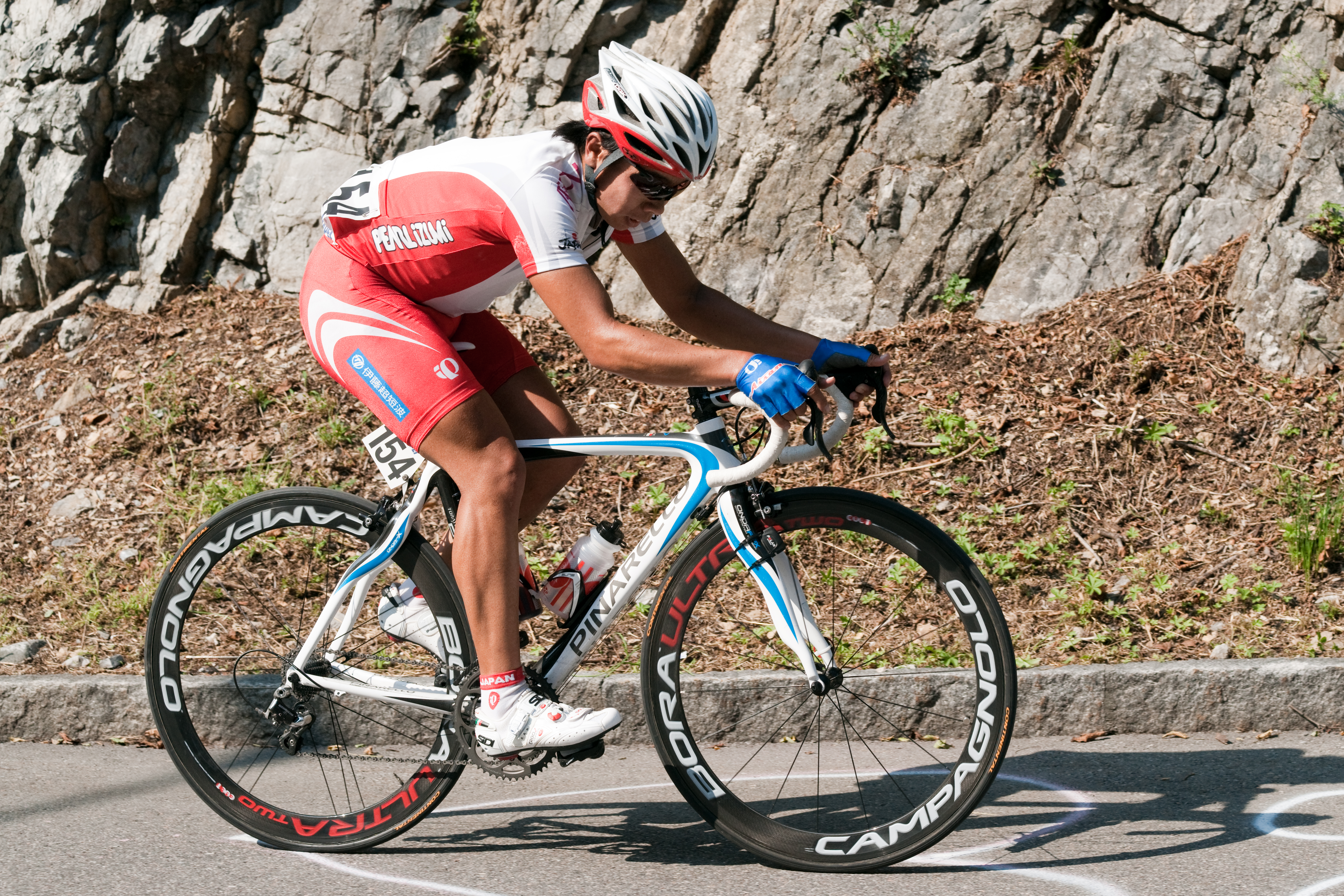

Personal information
- Full name: Taiji Nishitani
- Born: February 1, 1981 (age 45) Japan

Cycling career
- Sport: Cycling
- Current team: Aisan Racing Team
- Disciplines: Road; Track
- Role: Rider (retired); Directeur sportif

Amateur team
- 2003–2005: Aisan

Professional team
- 2006–2014: Aisan Racing Team

Managerial team
- 2015–: Aisan Racing Team

Major wins
- Tour de Hokkaido (2006); National Road Race Championships (2009)

Taiji Nishitani (西谷泰治, Nishitani Taiji; born 1 February 1981, in Hiroshima Prefecture) is a Japanese former professional racing cyclist who competed professionally between 2006 and 2014, entirely for the Aisan Racing Team. He was the winner of the Japanese National Road Race Championships in 2009. He retired at the end of the 2014 season, and now works as a directeur sportif for the Aisan Racing Team.

He joined Aisan Racing Team soon after graduating from Nihon University and had success on the UCI Asia Tour. He was the third Japanese to win a stage at the HC classified Tour de Langkawi. In addition to road races, Nishitani also represented Japan in international track cycling competitions, riding in such events as the scratch race, Madison, and omnium.

== Major results ==
2003
Tour de Hokkaido

1st Prologue & Stage 2

2004
Tour de Hokkaido

1st Prologue, Stages 2 & 3

2006
1st Overall Tour de Hokkaido

1st Stage 3

2007
Tour of South China Sea

1st Stages 6 & 8

1st Stage 2 Tour de Hokkaido

2008
1st Stage 3 Tour de East Java
1st Stage 6 Tour de Hokkaido

2009
1st Road race, National Road Championships
1st Stage 6 Jelajah Malaysia
1st Stage 3b Tour de Singkarak

2010
1st Stage 4 Tour de Langkawi
1st Prologue Tour de Hokkaido

2011
1st Stage 8 Tour de Taiwan
1st Stage 3 Tour de Kumano

2012
1st Stage 6 Tour of Japan
1st Stage 4 Tour of China I

2013
Tour of Japan

1st Stages 1 (ITT) & 6

7th Overall Tour de Korea
8th Overall Tour de East Java

1st Points classification

9th Japan Cup

2014
1st Stage 6 Tour of Thailand
