= Sho Hatsuyama =

Japanese cyclist

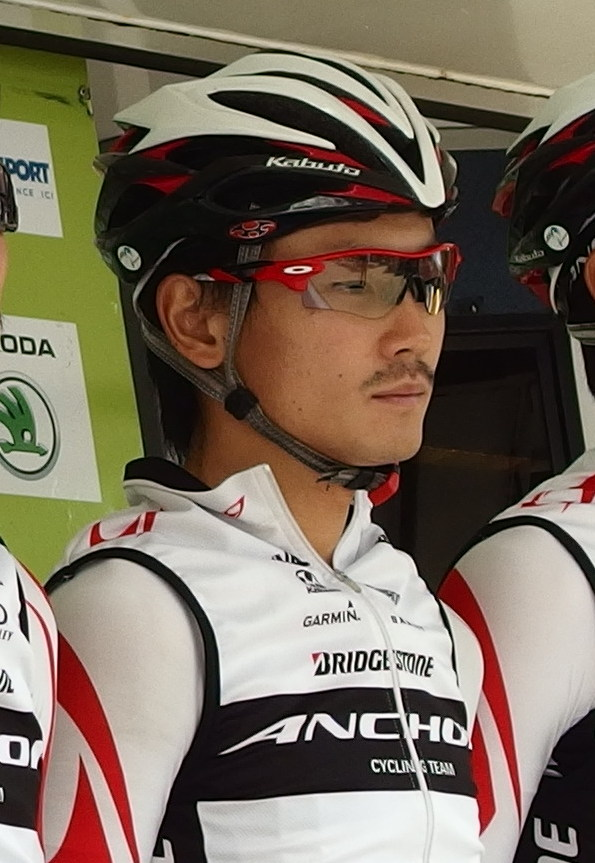
- Hatsuyama in 2015

Personal information
- Full name: Sho Hatsuyama
- Born: August 17, 1988 (age 38) Japan

Cycling career
- Sport: Cycling
- Current team: Retired
- Discipline: Road
- Role: Rider

Amateur teams
- 2006: You Can
- 2007: Cannondale–Diadora
- 2008–2009: Colnago
- 2009: Malmantile–Romano Gaini
- 2010: S.C. Cene Vallesseliana

Professional teams
- 2011–2012: Utsunomiya Blitzen
- 2013–2017: Bridgestone–Anchor
- 2018–2019: Nippo–Vini Fantini–Europa Ovini

Major wins
- One-day races and Classics National Road Race Championships (2016)

Sho Hatsuyama (初山 翔, Hatsuyama Shō; born August 17, 1988) is a Japanese former professional cyclist, who rode professionally between 2011 and 2019 for the Utsunomiya Blitzen, Bridgestone–Anchor and Nippo–Vini Fantini–Faizanè teams. His first victory in a road race as a professional was in the 2013 Tour de Okinawa, which he won after the first-place finisher was demoted due to rule violations. In October 2015, he won the ninth stage of the Tour de Singkarak. He became the Japanese road race champion in June 2016. In May 2019, he was named in the startlist for the 2019 Giro d'Italia.

== Major results ==
2012
10th Overall Tour de Kumano
2013
1st Tour de Okinawa
2014
9th Overall Tour de Singkarak
2015
6th Tour de Okinawa
7th Overall Tour de Kumano
10th Overall Tour de Singkarak

1st Stage 9

2016
1st Road race, National Road Championships
2017
1st Mountains classification Tour of Japan
10th Overall Tour de Korea

=== Grand Tour general classification results timeline ===
| Grand Tour | 2019 |
|---|---|
| Giro d'Italia | 142 |
| Tour de France | — |
| Vuelta a España | — |
