= Cycling at the 2026 Asian Games – Men's road race =

Men's individual road race at the 2026 Asian Games
- Venue: Shinshiro Cycling Road Course
- Date: 23 September 2026
- Competitors: 40 from 16 nations

Medalists
| gold medal | Alexey Lutsenko | Kazakhstan |
| silver medal | Yevgeniy Fedorov | Kazakhstan |
| bronze medal | Yuhi Todome | Japan |

The men's 157.6 kilometres road race competition at the 2026 Asian Games took place on 23 September 2026 in Shinshiro Cycling Road Course.

== Schedule ==
All times are Japan Standard Time (UTC+09:00)

| Date | Time | Event |
|---|---|---|
| Wednesday, 23 September 2026 | 09:00 | Final |

== Results ==
| Rank | Athlete | Time |
|---|---|---|
| 1st place, gold medalist(s) | Alexey Lutsenko (KAZ) | 4:13:11 |
| 2nd place, silver medalist(s) | Yevgeniy Fedorov (KAZ) | 4:15:09 |
| 3rd place, bronze medalist(s) | Yuhi Todome (JPN) | 4:15:51 |
| 4 | Sainbayaryn Jambaljamts (MGL) | 4:16:54 |
| 5 | Su Haoyu (CHN) | 4:16:55 |
| 6 | Sohei Kaneko (JPN) | 4:19:27 |
| 7 | Nicolas Vinokurov (KAZ) | 4:19:27 |
| 8 | Kim Eu-ro (KOR) | 4:20:17 |
| 9 | Yun Jae-bin (KOR) | 4:20:17 |
| 10 | Tegshbayar Batsaikhan (MGL) | 4:20:44 |
| 11 | Muhammad Syelhan (INA) | 4:21:04 |
| 12 | Nikita Tsvetkov (UZB) | 4:27:21 |
| 13 | Mohammad Al Mutaiwei (UAE) | 4:27:21 |
| 14 | Kam Chin Pok (MAC) | 4:27:21 |
| 15 | Vincent Lau (HKG) | 4:27:38 |
| 16 | Ahmed Naser (BHR) | 4:27:38 |
| 17 | Thanakhan Chaiyasombat (THA) | 4:27:38 |
| 18 | Muradjan Khalmuratov (UZB) | 4:27:38 |
| 19 | Arash Mirbagheri (IRI) | 4:28:56 |
| 20 | Diyor Takhirov (UZB) | 4:29:13 |
| 21 | Yu Yuanfeng (CHN) | 4:30:06 |
| 22 | Peerapol Chawchiangkwang (THA) | 4:32:48 |
| 23 | Sarawut Sirironnachai (THA) | 4:32:48 |
| — | Maulana Astnan Al Hayat (INA) | OTL |
| — | Bolor-erdene Enkhtaivan (MGL) | DNF |
| — | Qu Chengjun (CHN) | DNF |
| — | Abdulla Alhammadi (UAE) | DNF |
| — | Abdulla Jasim Al Ali (UAE) | DNF |
| — | Julian Abi Manyu (INA) | DNF |
| — | Wu Chun Yin (HKG) | DNF |
| — | Yip Hon Man (HKG) | DNF |
| — | Tu Chih-hao (TPE) | DNF |
| — | Cheang Shing Hei (MAC) | DNF |
| — | Lao Long San (MAC) | DNF |
| — | Nguyen Huong (VIE) | DNF |
| — | Pham Le Xuan Loc (VIE) | DNF |
| — | Quang Van Cuong (VIE) | DNF |
| — | Sahadat Hosain (BAN) | DNF |
| — | Yuma Koishi (JPN) | DNS |
| — | Sobur Husen (BAN) | DNS |
