= Hayato Okamoto (cyclist) =

Japanese cyclist

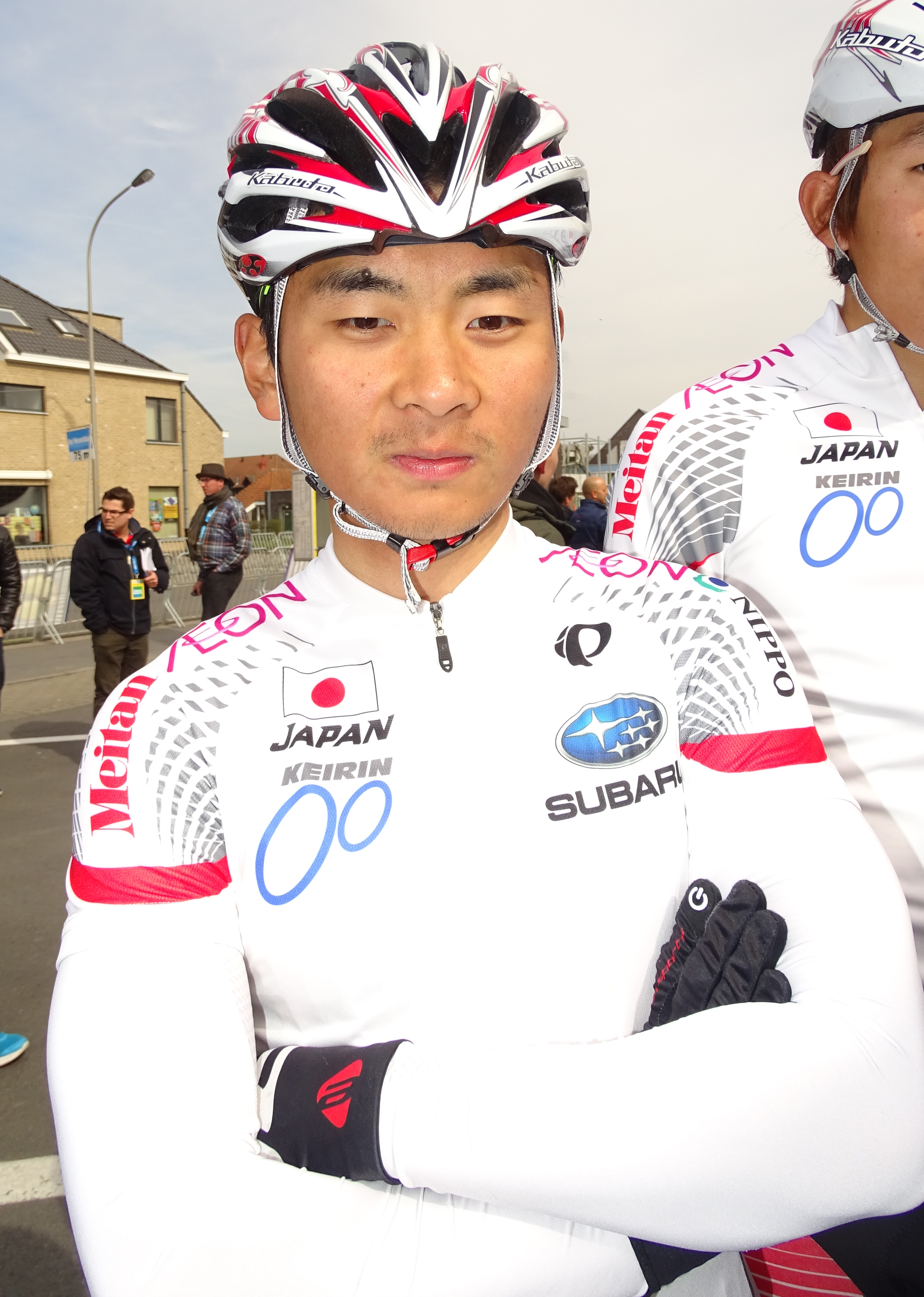
- Okamoto in 2016

Personal information
- Full name: Hayato Okamoto
- Born: 1 June 1995 (age 31) Kyoto, Japan

Cycling career
- Sport: Cycling
- Current team: Aisan Racing Team
- Discipline: Road
- Role: Rider

Professional teams
- 2017–: Aisan Racing Team
- 2018: Nippo–Vini Fantini–Europa Ovini (stagiaire)

Hayato Okamoto (岡本 隼, Okamoto Hayato; born 1 June 1995) is a Japanese cyclist, who currently rides for UCI Continental team Aisan Racing Team.

== Major results ==
2017
Asian Road Championships

1st Under-23 road race
2nd Team time trial

1st Stage 2 Tour de Hokkaido
2018
1st Stage 1 Tour de Taiwan
2019
6th Tour de Okinawa
2022
1st Stage 1 Tour de Taiwan
5th Road race, National Road Championships
2023
1st Oita Ikoinomichi Criterium
1st Shibushi Criterium
1st Kanoya Kimotsuki Road Race
6th Tour de Okinawa
2024
1st Kanoya Kimotsuki Road Race
1st Utsunomiya Kiyohara Criterium
1st Stage 3 Tour de Kumano
