= Cycling at the 2018 Asian Games – Women's road race =

Women's road race at the 2018 Asian Games
- Venue: Subang
- Date: 22 August 2018
- Competitors: 21 from 12 nations

Medalists
gold medal	Na Ah-reum	South Korea
silver medal	Pu Yixian	China
bronze medal	Eri Yonamine	Japan

The women's 104.4 kilometers individual road race competition at the 2018 Asian Games was held on 22 August 2018 in Subang.

== Schedule ==
All times are Western Indonesia Time (UTC+07:00)

Date	Time	Event
Wednesday, 22 August 2018	10:00	Final

== Results ==
Legend

- DNF — Did not finish

Rank	Athlete	Time
1st place, gold medalist(s)	Na Ah-reum (KOR)	2:55:47
2nd place, silver medalist(s)	Pu Yixian (CHN)	2:57:07
3rd place, bronze medalist(s)	Eri Yonamine (JPN)	2:57:07
4	Yang Qianyu (HKG)	2:57:09
5	Nguyễn Thị Thật (VIE)	2:57:35
6	Sun Jiajun (CHN)	2:57:39
7	Mandana Dehghan (IRI)	2:57:40
8	Lee Ju-mi (KOR)	2:57:40
9	Phetdarin Somrat (THA)	2:57:54
10	Natalya Saifutdinova (KAZ)	2:57:54
11	Nguyễn Thị Thi (VIE)	2:58:40
12	Renata Baymetova (UZB)	2:59:28
13	Huang Ting-ying (TPE)	3:01:20
14	Chaniporn Batriya (THA)	3:01:23
15	Azizah Farchana (INA)	3:02:38
16	Yanthi Fuchianty (INA)	3:05:01
17	Chang Yao (TPE)	3:06:10
18	Amiliya Iskakova (KAZ)	3:06:16
19	Pang Yao (HKG)	3:07:43
20	Miyoko Karami (JPN)	3:09:00
—	Razan Soboh (BRN)	DNF
