= Shoi Matsuda =

Japanese cyclist

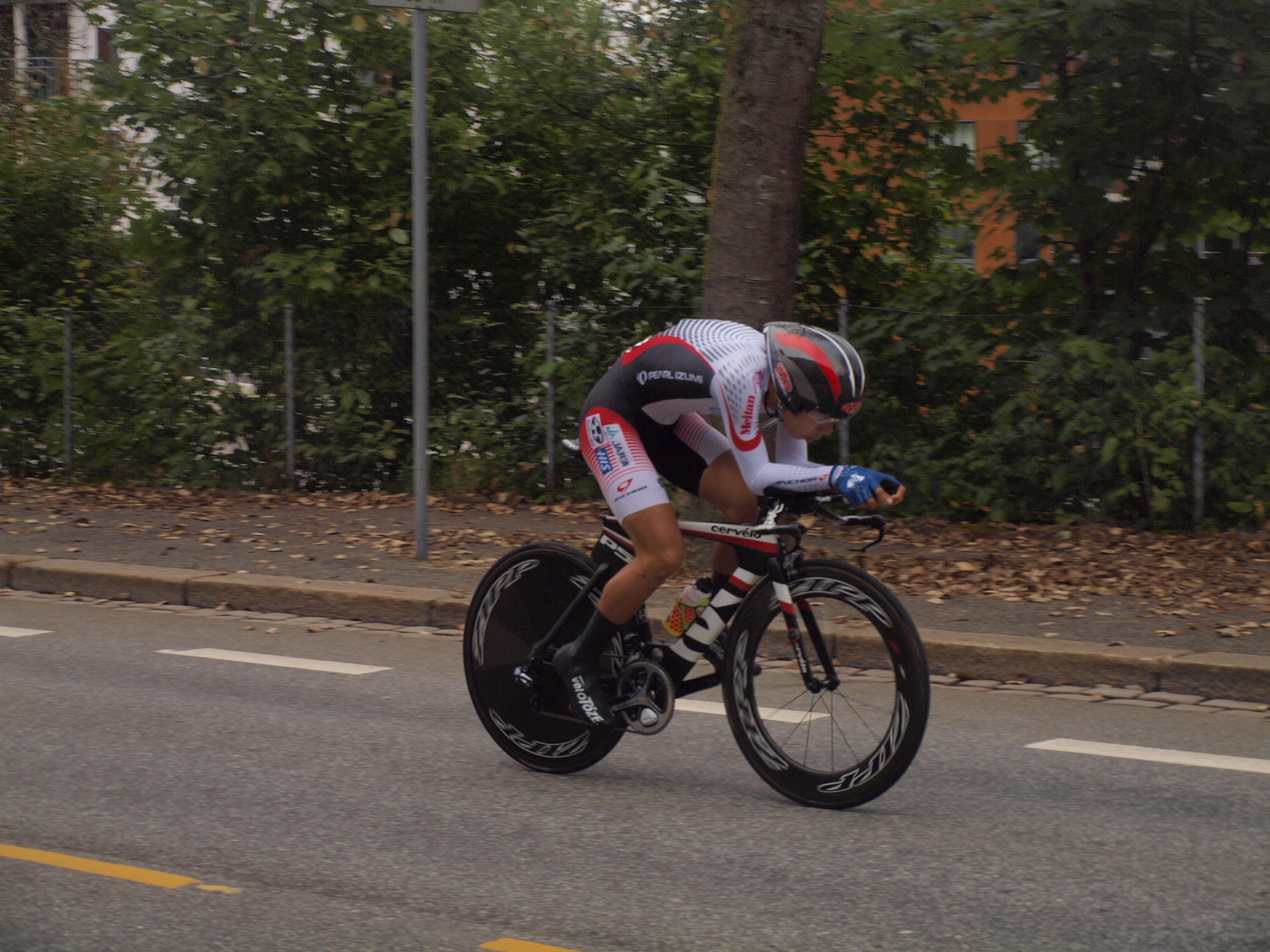
- Matsuda at the 2017 UCI Road World Championships

Personal information
- Born: 13 September 1999 (age 27) Gifu, Japan

Cycling career
- Sport: Cycling
- Current team: Team Bridgestone Cycling
- Disciplines: Road; Track
- Role: Rider

Amateur teams
- 2018–2019: EQADS
- 2020: AVC Aix-en-Provence
- 2021: EQADS

Professional team
- 2022–: Team Bridgestone Cycling
Medal record
Representing Japan
Men's road bicycle racing
Asian Championships
| Gold medal – first place | 2018 Naypyidaw | Team time trial |
| Bronze medal – third place | 2018 Naypyidaw | Under-23 time trial |
Men's track cycling
Asian Games
| Gold medal – first place | 2022 Hangzhou | Team pursuit |
| Silver medal – second place | 2026 Aichi–Nagoya | Team pursuit |
Asian Championships
| Gold medal – first place | 2022 New Delhi | Individual pursuit |
| Gold medal – first place | 2022 New Delhi | Team pursuit |
| Gold medal – first place | 2023 Nilai | Team pursuit |
| Gold medal – first place | 2024 New Delhi | Individual pursuit |
| Gold medal – first place | 2024 New Delhi | Team pursuit |
| Silver medal – second place | 2023 Nilai | Individual pursuit |
| Silver medal – second place | 2025 Nilai | Team pursuit |

Shoi Matsuda (born 13 September 1999) is a Japanese professional road and track cyclist, who currently rides for UCI Continental team Team Bridgestone Cycling. At the 2022 UCI Track Cycling World Championships, he set the Asian record in the individual pursuit in a time of 4:10.521.

== Major results ==
=== Road ===
2016
1st Road race, National Junior Road Championships
2017
1st Time trial, National Junior Road Championships
7th Overall Tour de DMZ

1st Stage 1

2018
Asian Road Championships

1st Team time trial
3rd Under-23 Time trial

1st Stage 3 Vuelta a Cantabria
2nd Road race, National Under-23 Road Championships
2nd Oita Urban Classic
2019
6th Time trial, Asian Under-23 Road Championships
7th Overall Tour de l'Espoir
2021
1st Time trial, National Under-23 Road Championships
2022
2nd Overall Tour de Kumano
3rd Overall Tour de Hokkaido

=== Track ===
2022
Asian Track Championships

1st Individual pursuit
1st Team pursuit
