= Mayuko Hagiwara =

Japanese racing cyclist

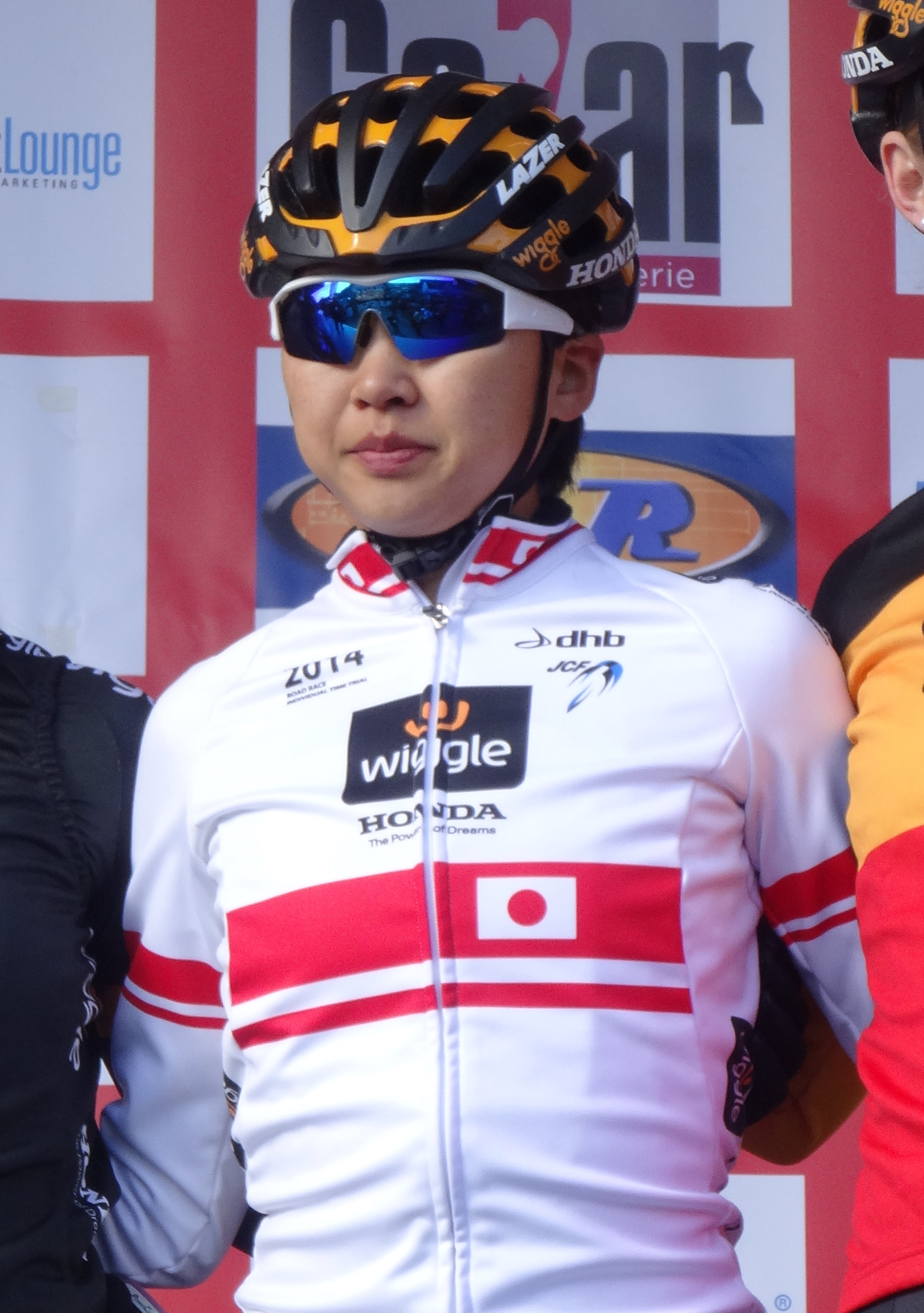
- Hagiwara in 2015.

Personal information
- Full name: Mayuko Hagiwara 萩原麻由子
- Born: 16 October 1986 (age 40) Maebashi, Gunma Prefecture, Japan
- Height: 168 cm (5 ft 6 in)

Cycling career
- Sport: Cycling
- Disciplines: Road; Track
- Role: Rider

Amateur team
- 2009–2012: Cycle Base Asahi

Professional teams
- 2013–2017: Wiggle–Honda
- 2018: Alé–Cipollini
- 2019–2020: Eneicat

Major wins
- National Time Trial Championships (2008–2012, 2014); National Road Race Championships (2010–2012, 2014–2015)
Medal record
Representing Japan
Women's road cycling
Asian Games
Gold medal – first place	2006 Doha	Road race
Asian Championships
Gold medal – first place	2016 Izu	Time trial
Silver medal – second place	2010 Sharjah	Time trial
Silver medal – second place	2015 Ratchasima	Time trial
Bronze medal – third place	2016 Izu	Road race
Bronze medal – third place	2008 Nara	Time trial
Women's track cycling
Asian Championships
Gold medal – first place	2010 Sharjah	Points race
Silver medal – second place	2005 Punjab	Points race

Mayuko Hagiwara (萩原麻由子, Hagiwara Mayuko; born 16 October 1986) is a Japanese racing cyclist, who most recently rode for UCI Women's Continental Team Eneicat–RBH Global.

== Career ==
Born in Maebashi, Hagiwara graduated from the National Institute of Fitness and Sports in Kanoya and joined the cycling team sponsored by the Japanese bicycle store Cycle Base Asahi. She won the Japanese National Road Race Championships three years in a row between 2010 and 2012 and the Japanese National Time Trial Championships five times in a row between 2008 and 2012. She represented Japan in cycling at the 2012 Summer Olympics in the women's individual road race. In November 2012, it was announced that Hagiwara had signed to ride with the British cycling team Wiggle–Honda for the 2013 season. She lost her national road race and time trial crowns to Eri Yonamine in 2013, but won both titles again in 2014. In 2015, she lost the time trial title to Yonamine, but was again crowned road race champion. That year also saw her become the first Japanese to win a stage in a grand tour, as she took victory in stage 6 of the Giro d'Italia Femminile.

== Major results ==
2004
Asian Junior Road Championships

1st Road race
1st Time trial

2005
2nd Points race, Asian Track Championships
2nd Time trial, National Road Championships
2006
1st Road race, Asian Games
2nd Road race, National Road Championships
World University Cycling Championship

9th Road race
10th Time trial

2008
National Road Championships

1st Time trial
3rd Road race

3rd Time trial, Asian Road Championships
2009
1st Time trial, National Road Championships
4th Road race, East Asian Games
2010
1st Points race, Asian Track Championships
National Road Championships

1st Road race
1st Time trial

2nd Time trial, Asian Road Championships
2011
National Road Championships

1st Road race
1st Time trial

6th Overall Tour de Bretagne Féminin
2012
National Road Championships

1st Road race
1st Time trial

2nd Overall Tour of Thailand
2013
1st Championnat de Wallonie
National Road Championships

2nd Time trial
3rd Road race

2014
National Road Championships

1st Road race
1st Time trial

1st Asian rider classification Tour of Zhoushan Island
2015
National Road Championships

1st Road race
2nd Time trial

1st Stage 6 Giro d'Italia Femminile
Asian Road Championships

2nd Time trial
10th Road race

3rd Gooik–Geraardsbergen–Gooik
3rd Grand Prix de Plumelec-Morbihan Dames
5th Overall Tour de Bretagne Féminin

1st Stage 3

2016
Asian Road Championships

1st Time trial
3rd Road race

National Road Championships

2nd Road race
3rd Time trial

2017
3rd Cadel Evans Great Ocean Road Race
