= Kisso Kawamuro =

Japanese cyclist

Personal information
- Born: August 1892 Yokohama, Japan
- Died: 1973 (aged 80–81)

Cycling career
- Sport: Cycling
- Discipline: Road

Professional team
- 1926–1927: Baggi-Samyn

Kisso Kawamuro (川室 競, Kawamuro Kisou; August 1892, in Yokohama – 1973) was a pioneering Japanese racing cyclist. His name is also rendered "Kiso" ("Kisou" is the correct romanization in modified Hepburn).

== Career ==
Born the son of a ship's captain, Kawamuro moved to France in 1918, where he was employed in the airplane and then automobile industries. He had participated in cycling races in Japan so he continued to ride in France. In 1926, he became the first Japanese to ride in the Tour de France by entering as a touriste-routier (an individual without a team). He also entered the race in 1927, but on that occasion as well, he retired during the first stage. The next Japanese to enter the race would be Daisuke Imanaka in 1996, and the first Japanese to complete the Tour would be Yukiya Arashiro and Fumiyuki Beppu in 2009.

In subsequent years, Kawamuro competed in demi-fond races in Germany. He eventually returned to Japan and worked in the motorcycle industry before dying in 1973 at the age of 82.
