= Aisan Racing Team =

Japanese cycling team

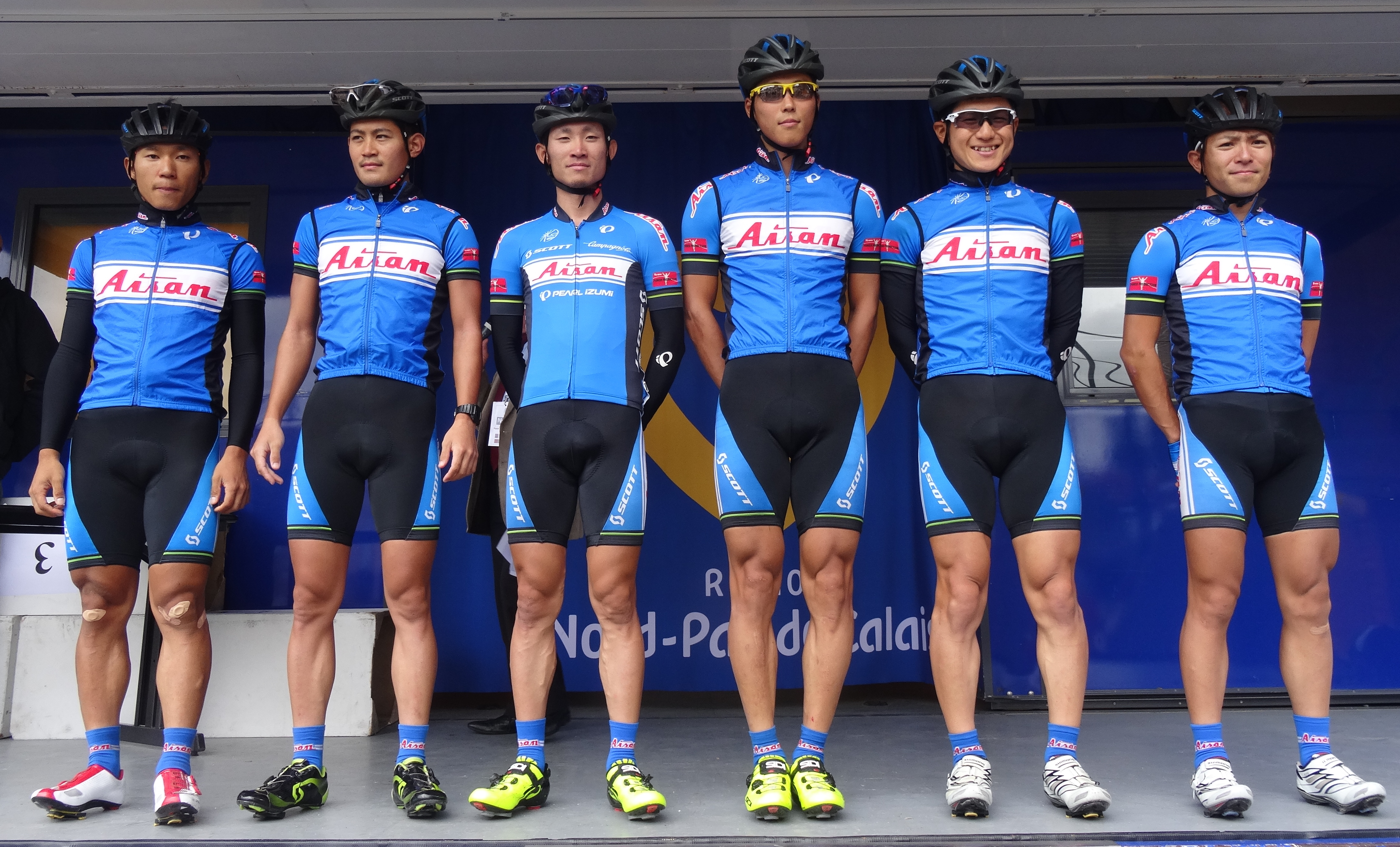

Team information
- UCI code: ART
- Registered: Japan
- Founded: 2006
- Discipline: Road
- Status: UCI Continental
- Website: Team home page

Key personnel
- General manager: Koji Sawada
- Team managers: Kenji Nakane; Tomohiro Hayakawa; Taiji Nishitani; Nana Watarai

Team name history
- 2025– 2006–2024: Aisan Racing Team (ART); Aisan Racing Team (AIS)

Aisan Racing Team (愛三工業レーシングチーム, Aisan Kōgyō Rēshingu Chīmu; UCI team code: ART) is a Japanese UCI Continental cycling team sponsored by Aisan Industry Co. Ltd..

It was previously formed in 1976 as the bicycle club for the employees of Aisan Industry. The club started racing in earnest in 1987 after registering in the Japan Industrial Track & Field Association.

== Team roster ==
As of 3 September 2026.

Rider	Date of birth
Shunya Amiji (JPN)	11 December 2002 (age 23)
Keito Kamiya (JPN)	4 August 2006 (age 20)
Shinnosuke Kato (JPN)	6 November 2002 (age 23)
George Matsui (JPN)	25 February 2004 (age 22)
Kazuto Minami (JPN)	15 August 2003 (age 23)

Rider	Date of birth
Hijiri Oda (JPN)	23 November 1998 (age 27)
Hayato Okamoto (JPN)	1 June 1995 (age 31)
Hayato Tobaru (JPN)	26 June 1997 (age 29)
Yuhi Todome (JPN)	18 June 2002 (age 24)
Rui Udagawa (JPN)	9 October 2002 (age 23)

== Major wins ==
2006
Overall Tour de Hokkaido, Taiji Nishitani

Prologue, Kazuhiro Mori
Stage 3, Taiji Nishitani

Stage 4 Herald Sun Tour, Satoshi Hirose
2007
Stage 7 Tour de Taiwan, Satoshi Hirose
Stage 2 Tour de Hokkaido, Taiji Nishitani
Stages 7 & 8 Tour of South China Sea, Taiji Nishitani
2008
Stage 3 Tour de East Java, Taiji Nishitani
Stage 1 Tour de Kumano, Satoshi Hirose
Stages 2 & 3 Tour de Hokkaido, Kazuhiro Mori
Stage 6 Tour de Hokkaido, Taiji Nishitani
2009
Road Race Championships, Taiji Nishitani
Time Trial Championships, Kazuhiro Mori
Stage 6 Jelajah Malaysia, Taiji Nishitani
Stage 3b Tour de Singkarak, Taiji Nishitani
Stage 2 Tour de Hokkaido, Kazuhiro Mori
2010
Stage 4 Tour de Langkawi, Taiji Nishitani
Prologue Tour de Hokkaido, Taiji Nishitani
Overall Tour of South China Sea, Kazuhiro Mori
2011
Stage 4 Tour de Langkawi, Takeaki Ayabe
Stage 8 Tour de Taiwan, Taiji Nishitani
Stage 1 Tour de Kumano, Shinpei Fukuda
Stage 3 Tour de Kumano, Taiji Nishitani
Stage 4 Tour de Singkarak, Yasuharu Nakajima
Stage 2 Tour of Hainan, Yasuharu Nakajima
Overall Tour de Okinawa, Kazuhiro Mori
2012
Stage 5 Tour of Japan, Taiji Nishitani
Stage 1 Tour de Singkarak, Masakazu Ito
Stage 6 Tour de Singkarak, Yasuharu Nakajima
Stage 4 Tour of China I, Taiji Nishitani
2013
Stages 1 (ITT) & 6 Tour of Japan, Taiji Nishitani
Stage 3 Tour de Ijen, Shinpei Fukuda
2014
Overall Tour of Thailand, Yasuharu Nakajima

Stage 6, Taiji Nishitani

Stage 1 Tour de East Java, Yasuharu Nakajima
2015
Asian rider classification Tour de Langkawi, Tomohiro Hayakawa
Overall Tour of Thailand, Yasuharu Nakajima
2017
Points classification Tour de Hokkaido, Hayato Okamoto

Stage 2, Hayato Okamoto

2018
Stage 1 Tour de Taiwan, Hayato Okamoto
Stage 3 Tour de Lombok, Shiki Kuroeda
Young rider classification Tour de Kumano, Sora Nomoto
2019
Stage 3 Tour de Ijen, Kakeru Omae
2022
Stage 1 Tour de Taiwan, Hayato Okamoto
2024
Stage 3 Tour de Kumano, Hayato Okamoto
2025
Stage 4 Tour of Japan, Rui Udagawa
2026
Road Race Championships, Yuhi Todome
