= Japanese National Time Trial Championships =

National road cycling championship in Japan

The Japanese National Time Trial Championships are conducted every year under the auspices of the Japan Cycling Federation. The record is held by Kazuya Okazaki with 4 wins.

== Multiple winners (Men) ==
Wins	Rider	Years
4	Kazuya Okazaki	2002, 2003, 2007, 2008
3	Makoto Iijima	1998, 2004, 2005
3	Fumiyuki Beppu	2006, 2011, 2014
3	Ryōta Nishizono	2012, 2016, 2017
2	Yoshiyuki Abe	1999, 2000
2	Nariyuki Masuda	2019, 2021
2	Sohei Kaneko	2022, 2024

== Men ==
=== Elite ===
Year	Gold	Silver	Bronze
1998	Makoto Iijima	Kumi Sugimura	Mika Ogishima
1999	Yoshiyuki Abe	Makoto Iijima	Tomoya Kano
2000	Yoshiyuki Abe		
2001	Akira Kakinuma	Yoshiyuki Abe	Ken Hashikawa
2002	Kazuya Okazaki	Tomoya Kano	Akira Kakinuma
2003	Kazuya Okazaki	Makoto Iijima	Ken Hashikawa
2004	Makoto Iijima	Yoshiyuki Abe	Masahiko Mifune
2005	Makoto Iijima	Kazuhiro Mori	Tomoya Kano
2006	Fumiyuki Beppu	Makoto Iijima	Kazuya Okazaki
2007	Kazuya Okazaki	Taiji Nishitani	Tomoya Kano
2008	Kazuya Okazaki	Taiji Nishitani	Tomoya Kano
2009	Kazuhiro Mori	Makoto Iijima	Taiji Nishitani
2010	Shinichi Fukushima	Nara Motoi	Makoto Iijima
2011	Fumiyuki Beppu	Junya Sano	Ryōta Nishizono
2012	Ryōta Nishizono	Junya Sano	Taiji Nishitani
2013	Masatoshi Ōba	Ryōta Nishizono	Kazushige Kuboki
2014	Fumiyuki Beppu	Junya Sano	Genki Yamamoto
2015	Ryūtarō Nakamura	Nariyuki Masuda	Ryōta Nishizono
2016	Ryōta Nishizono	Junya Sano	Nariyuki Masuda
2017	Ryōta Nishizono	Junya Sano	Rei Onodera
2018	Kazushige Kuboki	Ryo Chikatani	Yuma Koishi
2019	Nariyuki Masuda	Atsushi Oka	Fumiyuki Beppu
2020	No race		
2021	Nariyuki Masuda	Masaki Yamamoto	Hideto Nakane
2022	Sohei Kaneko	Yuma Koishi	Yukiya Arashiro
2023	Yuma Koishi	Masaki Yamamoto	Yukiya Arashiro
2024	Sohei Kaneko	Taishi Miyazaki	Yukiya Arashiro
2025	Shunsuke Imamura	Sohei Kaneko	Yuma Koishi

=== U23 ===
Year	Gold	Silver	Bronze
2009	Yoshiaki Shimada	Kazuki Aoyanagi	Genta Nakamura
2010	Yoshiaki Shimada	Masatsugu Takamiya	Masaki Gunji
2011	Hayato Yoshida	Masaki Gunji	Kensyo Sawada
2012	Hiroshi Tsubaki	Masaki Gunji	Koji Nagase
2013	Genki Yamamoto	Eiya Hashimoto	Takuto Kurabayashi
2014	Manabu Ishibashi	Takuto Kurabayashi	Taisei Kobayashi
2015	Yūma Koishi	Masaki Yamamoto	Marino Kobayashi
2016	Marino Kobayashi	Atsushi Oka	Rei Onodera
2017	Yudai Arashiro	Yuki Ishihara	Masahiro Ishigami
2018	Masaki Yamamoto	Yuki Ishihara	Ken Nakagawa
2019	Shunsuke Imamura	Yuki Ishihara	Kento Omachi
2020	No race		
2021	Shoi Matsuda	Yuhi Todome	Taishi Miyazaki
2022	Yuhi Todome	Taiki Kamimura	Hiryu Kayama
2023	Yoshiki Terada	Yugi Tsuda	Kyosuke Ito
2024	Koki Kamada	Yoshiki Terada	Shoma Hayashibara
2025	Jo Hashikawa	Ren Mochizuki	Kanta Umezawa

== Women ==
=== Elite ===
Year	Gold	Silver	Bronze
1998	Ayumu Otsuka	Kumi Sugimura	Mika Ogishima
1999	Kumi Sugimura	Mika Ogishima	Kanako Ito
2002	Ayumu Otsuka	Miyoko Karami	Kumi Sugimura
2004	Miyoko Karami	Satoko Sato	
2005	Miyoko Karami	Mayuko Hagiwara	
2006	Miho Oki	Miyoko Karami	
2007	Miho Oki	Ayako Toyooka	Masami Morita
2008	Mayuko Hagiwara	Miyoko Karami	Ayako Toyooka
2009	Mayuko Hagiwara	Remi Inoue	Minami Uwano
2010	Mayuko Hagiwara	Ayako Toyooka	Kiriko Hori
2011	Mayuko Hagiwara	Minami Uwano	Remi Inoue
2012	Mayuko Hagiwara	Eri Yonamine	Minami Uwano
2013	Eri Yonamine	Mayuko Hagiwara	Minami Uwano
2014	Mayuko Hagiwara	Eri Yonamine	Minami Uwano
2015	Eri Yonamine	Mayuko Hagiwara	Hiromi Kaneko
2016	Eri Yonamine	Yūmi Kajihara	Mayuko Hagiwara
2017	Eri Yonamine	Yūmi Kajihara	Miyoko Karami
2018	Eri Yonamine	Miyoko Karami	Anna Ito
2019	Eri Yonamine	Sae Fukuda	Minami Uwano
2020	No race		
2021	Shoko Kashiki	Yuno Ishigami	Yui Ishida
2022	Shoko Kashiki	Eri Yonamine	Hiromi Kaneko
2023	Yui Ishida	Maho Kakita	Kokoro Okura
2024	Hiromi Ohori	Erika Oda	Yukari Minohara
2025	Ayana Mizutani	Yumi Kajihara	Karin Abe

== See also ==
- Japanese National Road Race Championships
