= Takuto Kurabayashi =

Japanese cyclist

Personal information
- Full name: Takuto Kurabayashi; Japanese: 倉林 巧和
- Born: 1 February 1992 (age 34)

Cycling career
- Sport: Cycling
- Current team: Retired
- Disciplines: Road; Track
- Role: Rider

Professional teams
- 2012: Team UKYO (stagiaire)
- 2013: Team UKYO
- 2015–2016: Gunma–Grifin Racing Team
Medal record
Representing Japan
Men's track cycling
Asian Championships
Gold medal – first place	2015 Nakhon Ratchasima	Points race
Gold medal – first place	2016 Izu	Scratch race
Silver medal – second place	2015 Nakhon Ratchasima	Team pursuit

Takuto Kurabayashi (倉林 巧和, Kurabayashi Takuto; born 1 February 1992) is a Japanese former professional road and track cyclist. He won the gold medal in the scratch race at the 2016 Asian Cycling Championships.

== Major results ==
2013
3rd Time trial, National Under-23 Road Championships
2014
2nd Time trial, National Under-23 Road Championships
2015
Asian Track Championships

1st Points race
2nd Team pursuit

2016
1st Scratch, Asian Track Championships
