= Yoshiyuki Abe =

Japanese cyclist (born 1969)

Personal information
- Full name: Yoshiyuki Abe; Japanese: 阿部良之
- Born: August 15, 1969 (age 57) Osaka Prefecture, Japan
- Height: 1.75 m (5 ft 9 in)
- Weight: 65 kg (143 lb; 10.2 st)

Cycling career
- Sport: Cycling
- Discipline: Road
- Role: Rider

Amateur teams
- 2012–2016: Bici Corsa Avel
- 2017–2019: Abenova

Professional teams
- 1996: Panaria–Vinavil
- 1997: Mapei–GB
- 1998–2000: Shimano
- 2001: Team Colpack–Astro
- 2002–2004: Shimano Racing
- 2005–2008: Shimano–Memory Corp
- 2009: Shimano Racing Team
- 2010–2011: Matrix Powertag

Major wins
- Japanese National Road Race Championships (1997, 2000); Japanese National Time Trial Championships (1999, 2000); Japan Cup (1997)
Medal record
Representing Japan
Men's road bicycle racing
Asian Games
Bronze medal – third place	2006 Doha	Team Time Trial

Yoshiyuki Abe (阿部良之, Abe Yoshiyuki; born August 15, 1969 in Osaka Prefecture) is a Japanese racing cyclist, who last rode for Japanese amateur team Abenova. He turned professional with Shimano Racing, the team operated by Shimano, after graduating from Osaka Institute of Technology, but soon transferred to Italian teams. He won the Japan Cup in 1997 and is still the only Japanese to win that important race. He became Japanese national champion in the road race in 1997 and 2000, and in the individual time trial in 1999 and 2000. Abe represented Japan in the 2000 Summer Olympics and won a bronze medal in the 2006 Asian Games in the team time trial.

== Major results ==
1996
1st Stage 6 Tour de Pologne
1997
1st Road race, National Road Championships
1st Japan Cup
1998
7th Time trial, Asian Games
1999
1st Time trial, National Road Championships
2000
National Road Championships

1st Road race
1st Time trial

2001
2nd Time trial, National Road Championships
2002
4th Overall Tour of China
2003
1st Overall Tour of China
2004
2nd Time trial, National Road Championships
2006
3rd Team time trial, Asian Games
3rd Overall Tour of Hainan
5th Overall Tour de Korea
2007
9th Overall Jelajah Malaysia
2008
10th Overall Tour de Taiwan
2009
10th Time trial, National Road Championships
