= Cycling at the 2006 Asian Games – Women's road race =

Women's road race at the 2006 Asian Games
- Venue: Doha Cycling Street Circuit
- Date: 4 December 2006
- Competitors: 27 from 17 nations

Medalists
gold medal	Mayuko Hagiwara	Japan
silver medal	Zhao Na	China
bronze medal	Han Song-hee	South Korea

The women's 113.1 km road race competition at the 2006 Asian Games was held on 4 December at the Cycling Street Circuit.

== Schedule ==
All times are Arabia Standard Time (UTC+03:00)

Date	Time	Event
Monday, 4 December 2006	12:30	Final

== Results ==
Legend

- DNF — Did not finish

Rank	Athlete	Time
1st place, gold medalist(s)	Mayuko Hagiwara (JPN)	3:06:10
2nd place, silver medalist(s)	Zhao Na (CHN)	3:07:38
3rd place, bronze medalist(s)	Han Song-hee (KOR)	3:07:38
4	Miho Oki (JPN)	3:07:38
5	Son Hee-jung (KOR)	3:07:38
6	Zulfiya Zabirova (KAZ)	3:07:38
7	Meng Lang (CHN)	3:07:38
8	Võ Thị Phương Phi (VIE)	3:07:38
9	Banna Kamfoo (THA)	3:07:38
10	Jamie Wong (HKG)	3:07:38
11	Noor Azian Alias (MAS)	3:07:38
12	I Fang-ju (TPE)	3:07:38
13	Urraca Leow (MAS)	3:07:38
14	Nguyễn Thị Hoàng Oanh (VIE)	3:07:38
15	Uyun Muzizah (INA)	3:07:38
16	Marites Bitbit (PHI)	3:07:38
17	Monrudee Chapookam (THA)	3:07:38
18	Min Ok-suk (PRK)	3:07:38
19	Pak Pong-sim (PRK)	3:07:38
20	Jamsrangiin Ölzii-Solongo (MGL)	3:08:11
21	Sriyalatha Wickremasinghe (SRI)	3:11:39
22	Che Un Teng (MAC)	3:13:17
23	Raheela Bano (PAK)	3:13:21
24	Lyubov Dombitskaya (KAZ)	3:16:46
—	Ayesha Sumanaweera (SRI)	DNF
—	Kinaz Hmshow (SYR)	DNF
—	Yasmen Salman (SYR)	DNF
