= Satoshi Hirose =

Japanese cyclist (born 1976)

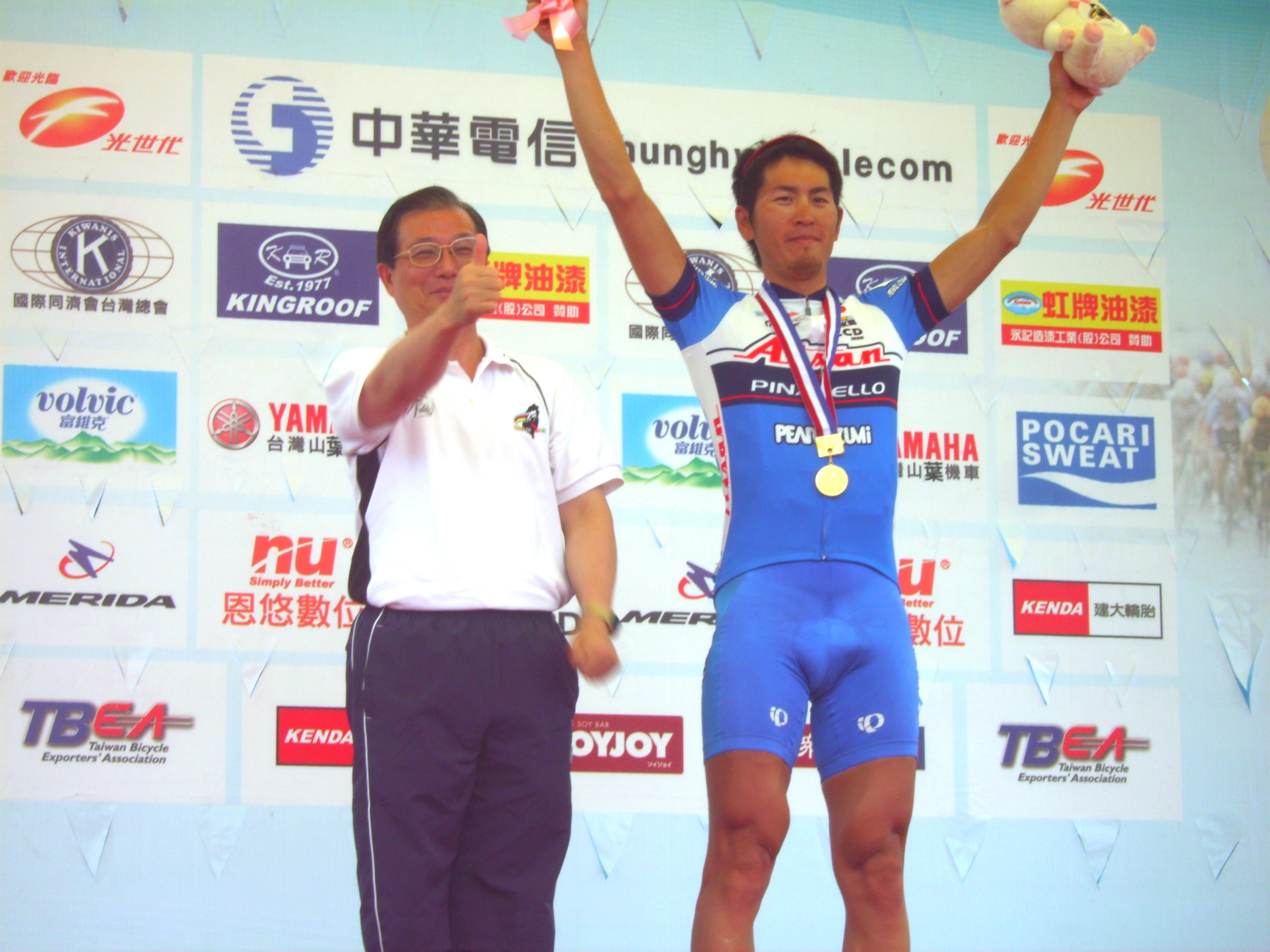
- Hirose in 2007

Personal information
- Full name: Satoshi Hirose
- Born: March 17, 1976 (age 50) Japan

Cycling career
- Sport: Cycling
- Current team: Retired
- Discipline: Road
- Role: Rider

Professional teams
- 1999–2004: Nippon Hodo
- 2006–2008: Aisan Racing Team

Satoshi Hirose (廣瀬敏, Hirose Satoshi; born 17 March 1976) is a former Japanese cyclist.

== Major results ==
2003
1st Overall Tour de Hokkaido

1st Stage 3

2006
1st Stage 4 Herald Sun Tour
3rd Team time trial, Asian Games
2007
1st Stage 7 Tour de Taiwan
2008
2nd Overall Tour de Kumano

1st Stage 1
