= Cycling at the 2018 Asian Games – Women's individual time trial =

Women's individual time trial at the 2018 Asian Games
- Venue: Subang
- Date: 24 August 2018
- Competitors: 13 from 13 nations

Medalists
gold medal	Na Ah-reum	South Korea
silver medal	Eri Yonamine	Japan
bronze medal	Leung Wing Yee	Hong Kong

The women's road time trial competition at the 2018 Asian Games took place on 24 August 2018 in Subang.

== Schedule ==
All times are Western Indonesia Time (UTC+07:00)

Date	Time	Event
Friday, 24 August 2018	09:00	Final

== Results ==
Legend

- DNS — Did not start

Rank	Athlete	Time
1st place, gold medalist(s)	Na Ah-reum (KOR)	31:57.10
2nd place, silver medalist(s)	Eri Yonamine (JPN)	31:57.26
3rd place, bronze medalist(s)	Leung Wing Yee (HKG)	34:22.15
4	Liang Hongyu (CHN)	34:50.02
5	Phetdarin Somrat (THA)	34:51.58
6	Mandana Dehghan (IRI)	35:07.01
7	Huang Ting-ying (TPE)	35:14.55
8	Yanthi Fuchianty (INA)	35:46.03
9	Natalya Saifutdinova (KAZ)	36:23.81
10	Choo Ling Er (SGP)	36:34.16
11	Nguyễn Thị Thu Mai (VIE)	36:58.38
12	Razan Soboh (BRN)	37:24.51
—	Roba Helane (SYR)	DNS
