= Daisuke Imanaka =

Japanese cyclist (born 1963)

Personal information
- Born: July 24, 1963 (age 63) Hiroshima, Japan

Cycling career
- Sport: Cycling
- Current team: Retired
- Discipline: Road

Professional team
- 1994–1997: Team Polti–Vaporetto

Daisuke Imanaka (今中 大介, Imanaka Daisuke; born 24 July 1963, in Hiroshima, Hiroshima) is a Japanese former professional racing cyclist, who helped to pioneer professional cycling in Japan. Following the lead of Masatoshi Ichikawa, he rode professionally in Europe for the Italian Team Polti and in 1995 became the second Japanese to compete in the Giro d'Italia (after Ichikawa). In 1996, he became the second Japanese to start the Tour de France (after Kisso Kawamuro). On both occasions, he had to retire before finishing the race. His major victories include three wins in the Tour de Hokkaido. He is now a frequent commentator on broadcasts of cycling races in Japan and also serves as technical adviser for Team Ukyo.

== Major results ==
1990
1st Overall Tour de Hokkaido
1991
1st Overall Tour de Hokkaido
1993
1st Overall Tour de Hokkaido
1994
9th Japan Cup Cycle Road Race
1996
2nd Tour de Okinawa
3rd Overall Tour of Japan
1997
4th Japan Cup Cycle Road Race
