= Kenji Itami =

Japanese cyclist (born 1988)

Personal information
- Full name: Kenji Itami
- Born: September 15, 1988 (age 38) Okinawa, Japan

Cycling career
- Sport: Cycling
- Current team: Retired
- Discipline: Road
- Role: Rider

Professional teams
- 2009–2014: Bridgestone–Anchor
- 2015–2016: Kinan Cycling Team

Kenji Itami (伊丹 健治, Itami Kenji; born September 15, 1988) is a Japanese former professional cyclist. He won the Tour de Okinawa in 2009.

== Major results ==
2009
1st Overall Tour de Okinawa

1st Stage 2

2010
2nd Tour de Okinawa
