= Nariyuki Masuda =

Japanese cyclist (born 1983)

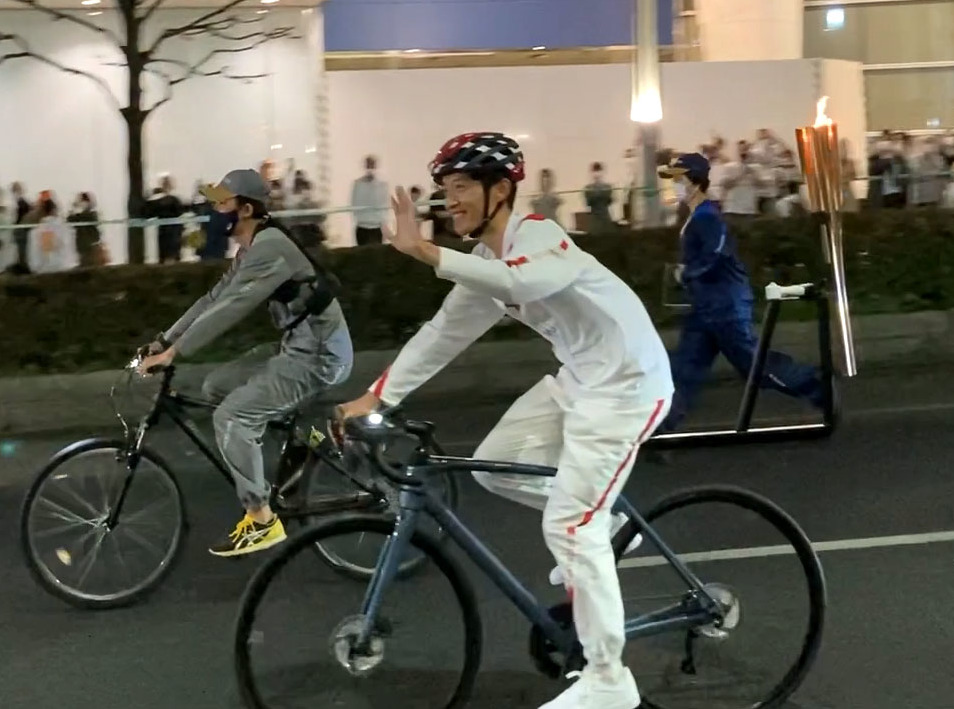
- Nariyuki Masuda at 2020 Summer Olympics torch relay in Utsunomiya (2021)

Personal information
- Full name: Nariyuki Masuda; Japanese: 増田 成幸
- Born: 23 October 1983 (age 42) Sendai, Japan
- Height: 1.76 m (5 ft 9 in)
- Weight: 63 kg (139 lb; 9.9 st)

Cycling career
- Sport: Cycling
- Current team: Astemo Utsunomiya Blitzen
- Discipline: Road
- Role: Rider

Professional teams
- 2006–2007: Miyata
- 2008–2009: Meitan Hompo
- 2010: CDC–Cavaliere
- 2011–2012: Utsunomiya Blitzen
- 2013: Cannondale
- 2014–2022: Utsunomiya Blitzen
- 2023–2025: JCL Team UKYO
- 2026–: Astemo Utsunomiya Blitzen
Medal record
Representing Japan
Men's road bicycle racing
Asian Championships
Silver medal – second place	2022 Dushanbe	Road race
Silver medal – second place	2022 Dushanbe	Time trial
Silver medal – second place	2017 Manama	Team time trial

Nariyuki Masuda (増田 成幸, Nariyuki Masuda; born 23 October 1983) is a Japanese professional racing cyclist, who rides for UCI Continental team Astemo Utsunomiya Blitzen.

== Career ==
Born in Sendai, Masuda attended Nihon University. While there, he started riding for Team Miyata, as well as provided the power for the university's human-powered aircraft.

In October 2012, it was announced that he had been signed by the Cannondale team, for the 2013 season. He remained with the team for one year, before rejoining Utsunomiya Blitzen for the 2014 season.

In 2017 he was diagnosed with Graves' disease and could not race for most of the season.

== Major results ==
2007
6th Tour de Okinawa
8th Overall Tour de Hokkaido
2011
9th Overall Tour de Kumano
2012
2nd Road race, National Road Championships
4th Overall Tour de Kumano
4th Overall Tour de Hokkaido
2013
3rd Road race, National Road Championships
2014
1st Tour de Okinawa
10th Overall Tour of Japan
10th Overall Tour de Kumano
2015
National Road Championships

2nd Time trial
3rd Road race

2016
1st Overall Tour de Hokkaido

1st Mountains classification
1st Stage 2

1st Tour de Okinawa
National Road Championships

3rd Time trial
5th Road race

4th Time trial, Asian Road Championships
10th Overall Tour of Japan
2017
2nd Team time trial, Asian Road Championships
2018
3rd Overall Tour de Tochigi
8th Oita Urban Classic
8th Tour de Okinawa
2019
1st Time trial, National Road Championships
1st Tour de Okinawa
5th Overall Tour de Langkawi
7th Road race, Asian Road Championships
8th Overall Tour de Taiwan

1st Asian rider classification

10th Overall Tour of Japan
2021
National Road Championships

1st Time trial
2nd Road race

1st Overall Tour of Japan

1st Mountains classification
1st Stage 1

2022
Asian Road Cycling Championships

2nd Road race
2nd Time trial

4th Overall Tour of Japan
4th Overall Tour de Kumano
8th Overall Tour de Hokkaido
10th Oita Urban Classic
2025
5th Tour de Okinawa
