= Kazuya Okazaki =

Japanese cyclist

Personal information
- Born: 10 May 1972 (age 54) Hiroshima Prefecture, Japan

Cycling career
- Sport: Cycling
- Current team: Retired
- Discipline: Road
- Role: Rider

Professional teams
- 1996–1998: Inoakku
- 1999–2001: Kinan
- 2002–2006: Nihon Hodō
- 2007–2009: Equipe Asada

Major wins
- Japanese TT Champion 2002, 2003, 2007, 2008; Asian TT Champion 2002

Kazuya Okazaki (岡崎 和也, Okazaki Kazuya; born 10 May 1972) is a Japanese former professional racing cyclist particularly known for his time trial skills. He won the Japanese National Time Trial Championships four times in 2002, 2003, 2007, and 2008. He also won the time trial event at the 2002 Asian Cycling Championships. In road race competitions, his best result was a victory in the 2003 Tour de Okinawa.

== Palmares ==
2002
1st Asian Time Trial Champion
1st National Time Trial Championships
2003
1st National Time Trial Championships
1st Tour de Okinawa
2007
1st National Time Trial Championships
2008
1st National Time Trial Championships
