= Yūma Koishi =

Japanese cyclist

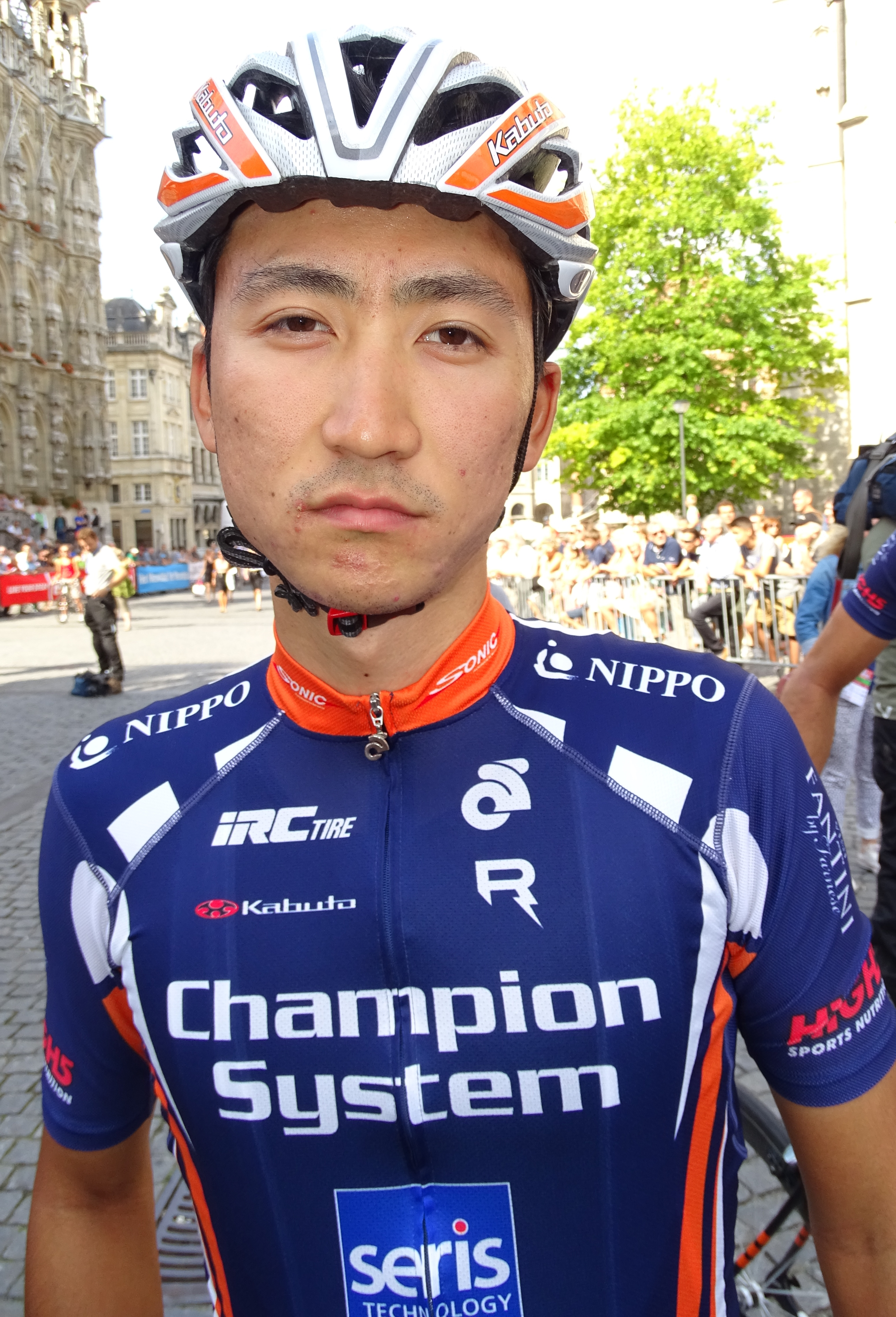
- Koishi in 2015.

Personal information
- Full name: Yūma Koishi; Japanese: 小石 祐馬
- Born: September 15, 1993 (age 33) Ōtsu, Japan
- Height: 1.75 m (5 ft 9 in)
- Weight: 62 kg (137 lb)

Cycling career
- Sport: Cycling
- Current team: Team UKYO
- Discipline: Road
- Role: Rider

Amateur teams
- 2012–2013: Eurasia
- 2013: Colba–Superano Ham (stagiaire)

Professional teams
- 2014: Vini Fantini–Nippo
- 2015: CCT p/b Champion System
- 2016–2017: Nippo–Vini Fantini
- 2018–2025: Team UKYO
- 2026–: Kinan Racing Team
Medal record
Men's road bicycle racing
Japan
Asian Championships
Silver medal – second place	2025 Phitsanulok	Mixed team relay

Yūma Koishi (小石 祐馬, Koishi Yūma; born 15 September 1993) is a Japanese cyclist, who currently rides for UCI Continental team Kinan Racing Team.

== Major results ==
2015
Asian Under-23 Road Championships

1st Road race
3rd Individual time trial

1st Time trial, National Under-23 Road Championships
9th Gran Premio di Poggiana
2018
7th Overall Tour de Lombok Mandalika
2021
3rd Oita Urban Classic
5th Overall Tour of Japan
2022
2nd Overall Tour of Thailand
2nd Time trial, National Road Championships
2023
1st Time trial, National Road Championships
3rd Overall Tour of Thailand
Asian Road Championships

4th Road race
5th Time trial

2024
2nd Overall Tour de Taiwan
4th Overall Tour de Kumano
7th Overall Tour de Kyushu
2025
4th Asian Continental Championship Road Race
6th Overall Tour de Kumano
2026
6th Overall Tour of Sharjah
10th Overall Tour de Taiwan

1st Asian rider classification
