= Miyoko Karami =

Japanese cyclist (born 1974)

Personal information
- Born: 6 September 1974 (age 52) Japan

Cycling career
- Sport: Cycling
- Discipline: Road cycling

Professional teams
- 2005: Pasta Zara-Cogeas
- 2007: Saccarelli Emu Sea Marsciano

Miyoko Karami (唐見 実世子, Karami Miyoko; born 6 September 1974) is a road cyclist from Japan. She represented her nation in the Women's road race at the 2004 Summer Olympics. She became Japanese Time Trial Champion in 2004 and 2005. She also rode at the 2005 UCI Road World Championships.
