= Gunma–Grifin Racing Team =

Gunma-Grifin Racing Team
Team information
- Registered: Japan
- Founded: 2015
- Discipline: Road
- Status: UCI Continental (2015–2016); National (2017– )

Team name history
- 2015–: Gunma-Grifin Racing Team

Gunma-Grifin Racing Team (群馬グリフィン, Gunma Gurifin) is a Japanese cycling team established in 2015 based in Gunma Prefecture. It was registered as UCI Continental team in 2015–2016. It competes mainly in JBCF JProTour league.

== Team roster ==
As of May 3, 2015.

Rider	Date of birth
Masaru Fukuhara (JPN)	15 October 1981 (age 44)
Daisuke Kaneko (JPN)	13 November 1991 (age 34)
Masaaki Kanno (JPN)	21 July 1988 (age 38)
Tomoya Kano (JPN)	14 July 1973 (age 53)

Rider	Date of birth
Takahito Kishi (JPN)	9 March 1994 (age 32)
Takuto Kurabayashi (JPN)	1 February 1992 (age 34)
Yusaku Nakai (JPN)	30 November 1994 (age 31)
Yosuke Suga (JPN)	26 February 1980 (age 46)
