= Eri Yonamine =

Japanese cyclist

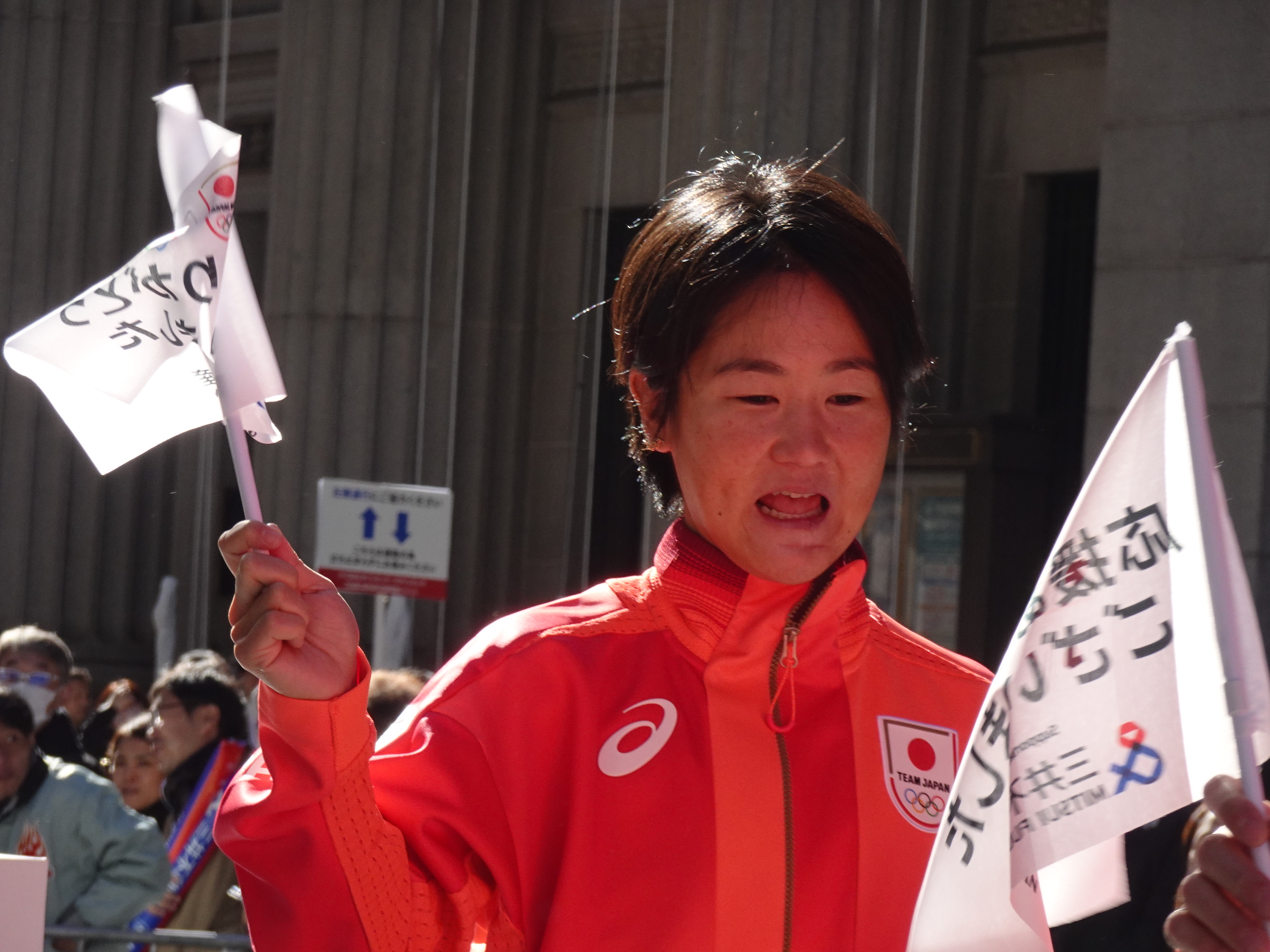
- Yonamine in 2024

Personal information
- Full name: Eri Yonamine; Japanese: (與那嶺恵理)
- Born: 25 April 1991 (age 35) Osaka, Japan

Cycling career
- Sport: Cycling
- Current team: Retired
- Disciplines: Road; Cyclo-cross; Mountain biking
- Role: Rider
- Rider type: All-rounder

Amateur team
- 2013: Team Forza

Professional teams
- 2016: Hagens Berman–Supermint
- 2016–2017: Poitou-Charentes.Futuroscope.86
- 2018: Wiggle High5
- 2019–2020: Alé–Cipollini
- 2021: Tibco–Silicon Valley Bank
- 2022–2023: Human Powered Health
- 2024: Laboral Kutxa–Fundación Euskadi

Major wins
- One day races & Classics National Road Race Championships (2013, 2016–2019, 2023–2024) National Time Trial Championships (2013, 2015–2019)
Medal record
Women's road bicycle racing
Representing Japan
Asian Games
Silver medal – second place	2018 Jakarta-Palembang	Time trial
Silver medal – second place	2022 Hangzhou	Time trial
Bronze medal – third place	2018 Jakarta-Palembang	Road race

Eri Yonamine (與那嶺恵理, Yonamine Eri; born 25 April 1991) is a Japanese former professional racing cyclist, who rode professionally between 2016 and 2024 for seven different teams. Her thirteen professional victories came entirely at the Japanese national road championships – seven Japanese National Road Race Championships titles and six Japanese National Time Trial Championships titles – while she also won three medals at the Asian Games.

Yonamine only switched from tennis to cycling when in college at the University of Tsukuba, and quickly achieved success in Japan, coming in second in both the Japanese National Road Race Championships and the Japanese National Time Trial Championships in 2012 at age 21. The next year, she won both the national road race and time trial championships. In the spring of 2016, she signed a short-term contract with the American UCI team Hagens Berman–Supermint, and later repeated her victory in the national time trial. Yonamine was selected to represent Japan in the 2016 Summer Olympics.

== Major results ==
2012
National Road Championships

2nd Road race
2nd Time trial

2013
National Road Championships

1st Road race
1st Time trial

2nd National Cyclo-cross Championships
8th Road race, Asian Road Championships
2014
1st Cross-country, National Mountain Bike Championships
2nd Time trial, Asian Road Championships
National Road Championships

2nd Road race
2nd Time trial

2015
National Road Championships

1st Time trial
2nd Road race

2016
National Road Championships

1st Road race
1st Time trial

4th Road race, Asian Road Championships
5th Overall Tour Cycliste Féminin International de l'Ardèche
7th Overall Joe Martin Stage Race
7th Overall Trophée d'Or Féminin
7th Chrono des Nations
9th Overall Tour of the Gila
2017
National Road Championships

1st Road race
1st Time trial

Combativity award Stage 2, Holland Ladies Tour
2018
National Road Championships

1st Road race
1st Time trial

Asian Games

2nd Time trial
3rd Road race

2019
National Road Championships

1st Road race
1st Time trial

6th Overall Women's Tour of Scotland
2022
2nd Road race, National Road Championships
2nd Overall Tour féminin international des Pyrénées
2023
1st Road race, National Road Championships
2024
1st Road race, National Road Championships
