= CCT p/b Champion System =

Team information
- UCI code: CCT
- Registered: New Zealand
- Founded: 2015
- Disbanded: 2015
- Discipline: Road
- Status: UCI Continental
- Bicycles: Reven

Key personnel
- General manager: Franky Van Haesebroucke

Team name history
- 2015: CCT p/b Champion System

CCT p/b Champion System was a New Zealand UCI Continental cycling team that existed in 2015. The team raced both road and cyclo-cross races.

== Team roster ==
As of 1 January 2015.

Rider	Date of birth
Darijus Džervus (LTU)	20 July 1990 (aged 24)
Denis Flahaut (FRA)	28 November 1978 (aged 36)
Morten Gadgaard (Note: Gadgaard left the team on 25 August 2015) (DEN)	22 May 1991 (aged 23)
Jesse Geerts (Note: Geerts joined the team on 1 June) (BEL)	28 April 1995 (aged 19)
Paco Ghistelinck (Note: Ghistelinc joined the team on 24 June) (BEL)	21 March 1993 (aged 21)
Tom Goovaerts (BEL)	3 July 1988 (aged 26)
Joshua Haggerty (NZL)	20 December 1995 (aged 19)
Yuma Koishi (JPN)	15 September 1993 (aged 21)
Jonathan Page (USA)	16 September 1979 (aged 35)

Rider	Date of birth
James Spragg (GBR)	19 July 1987 (aged 27)
Suguru Tokuda (JPN)	31 May 1994 (aged 20)
Tanzo Tokuda (JPN)	13 April 1992 (aged 22)
Seppe Verschuere (Note: Verschuere joined the team on 1 August, as a stagiaire) (BEL)	6 January 1994 (aged 20)
Michael Vink (NZL)	22 November 1991 (aged 23)
Sascha Weber (GER)	23 February 1988 (aged 26)
Ryan Wills (NZL)	19 January 1988 (aged 26)
Matthew Zenovich (NZL)	26 February 1994 (aged 20)

== Major wins ==
2015
New Zealand National Time Trial Championships, Michael Vink
Greymouth Around Brunner Ride, Michael Vink
Asian Cycling Championships U23 Road Race, Yuma Koishi
Japan National U23 Time Trial Championships, Yuma Koishi
Beromünster, Sascha Weber
Madiswil, Sascha Weber
Iowa I, Jonathan Page
