= Team Bridgestone Cycling =

Japanese cycling team

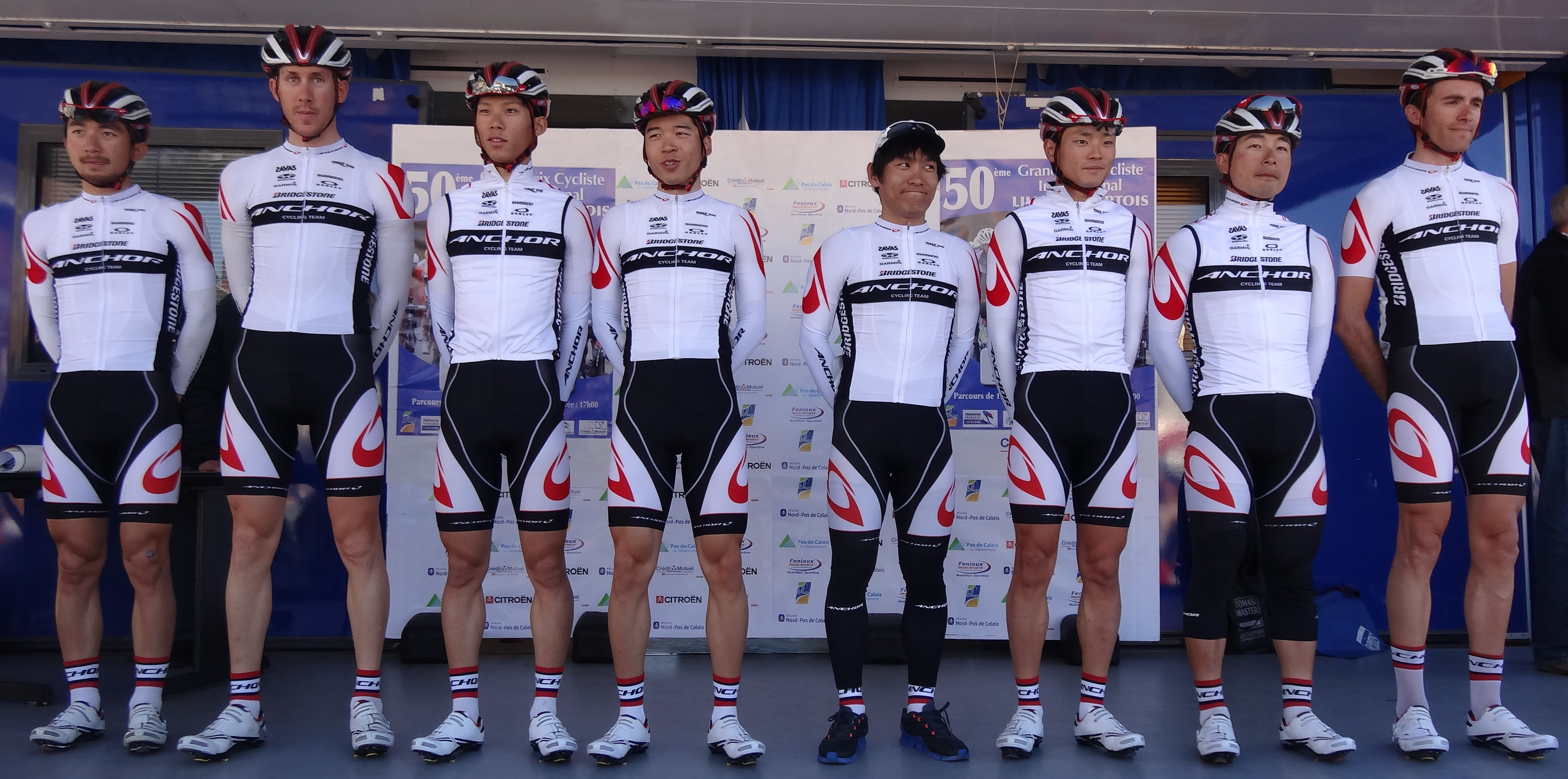

Team information
- UCI code: BGT
- Registered: Japan
- Founded: 2008
- Disciplines: Road; Track; Mountain biking; Para-cycling
- Status: Continental
- Website: Team home page

Key personnel
- General manager: Junichi Shibuya
- Team manager: Keisuke Miyazaki

Team name history
- 2008–2009 2010–2013 2014–2017 2018–: Team Bridgestone Anchor; Bridgestone Anchor; Bridgestone Anchor Cycling Team; Team Bridgestone Cycling

Team Bridgestone Cycling (UCI team code: BGT) is a continental cycling team based in Japan that participates in UCI Continental Circuits races.

The team's history can be traced back to 1964, but its current incarnation as the UCI registered road-racing team Team Bridgestone-Anchor started in 2008. For the 2012 season the team made a major change, adding several non-Japanese riders and running half their races outside Japan. For 2013, they signed Damien Monier, a French stage winner at the Giro d'Italia. During this period another Frenchman Thomas Lebas was the team leader for 5 years.

In 2018, the team changed its name to Team Bridgestone Cycling, with an all-Japanese team roster.

== Team roster ==
As of 17 February 2022.

Rider	Date of birth
Ryo Chikatani (JPN)	17 April 1992 (age 34)
Eiya Hashimoto (JPN)	15 December 1993 (age 32)
Shunsuke Imamura (JPN)	14 February 1998 (age 28)
Shōki Kawano (JPN)	26 March 2000 (age 26)
Naoki Kojima (JPN)	1 November 2000 (age 25)

Rider	Date of birth
Kazushige Kuboki (JPN)	6 June 1989 (age 37)
Shoi Matsuda (JPN)	13 September 1999 (age 26)
Toki Sawada (JPN)	12 January 1994 (age 32)
Suguru Tokuda (JPN)	31 May 1994 (age 32)
Tetsuo Yamamoto (JPN)	17 March 2000 (age 26)

== Major wins ==
2008
Stage 8a Tour de Martinique, Masamichi Yamamoto
2009
Stage 1 Jelajah Malaysia, Makoto Iijima
Overall Tour de Okinawa, Kenji Itami

Stage 2, Kenji Itami

2010
Stage 2 Tour de Taiwan, Miyataka Shimizu
Overall Tour de Martinique, Miyataka Shimizu

Stage 7, Miyataka Shimizu

Overall Tour de Hokkaido, Miyataka Shimizu

Stage 2, Miyataka Shimizu

2011
Stage 2 Tour of the Philippines, Kazuo Inoue
2012
Japan Japanese National Time Trial Championships, Ryota Nishizono
2013
Tsugaike Kogen, Damien Monier
Overall Tour de Hokkaido, Thomas Lebas

Stage 2, Thomas Lebas

Tour de Okinawa, Sho Hatsuyama
2014
Overall Tour International de Sétif, Thomas Lebas
Stage 4 Tour Cycliste International de la Guadeloupe, Thomas Lebas
Stage 2 Tour de Constantine, Thomas Lebas
Stage 3 Tour de Constantine, Damien Monier
2015
Overall Tour de Filipinas, Thomas Lebas
Stage 1 Tour of Thailand, Kohei Uchima
Stage 9 Tour de Singkarak. Sho Hatsuyama
2016
Japan Japanese National Road Race Championships, Sho Hatsuyama
Japan Japanese National Time Trial Championships, Ryota Nishizono
2017
Stage 3 Tour de Kumano, Damien Monier
Japan Japanese National Time Trial Championships, Ryota Nishizono
Stage 1 Tour de Hokkaido, Ryu Suzuki
2018
Japan Japanese National Time Trial Championships, Kazushige Kuboki
2019
Stage 8 Tour of Japan, Kazushige Kuboki
Prologue Tour de Kumano, Keitaro Sawada
2022
Stage 1 & 3 Tour de Hokkaido, Shunsuke Imamura
2023
Stage 8 Tour of Japan, Kazushige Kuboki
Points classification Tour de Kyushu, Naoki Kojima

Stage 1, Naoki Kojima

== National champions ==
2012
Japan Time Trial, Ryota Nishizono

2016
Japan Road Race, Sho Hatsuyama
Japan Time Trial, Ryota Nishizono

2017
Japan Time Trial, Ryota Nishizono

2018
Japan Time Trial, Kazushige Kuboki
