= Japan Cup (cycling) =

Japanese one-day road cycling race

Race details
- Date: October
- Region: Japan
- Local name: ジャパンカップサイクルロードレース (in Japanese)
- Discipline: Road
- Competition: UCI ProSeries 1.Pro
- Type: Classic one-day race
- Web site: www.japancup.gr.jp

History
- First edition: 1992
- Editions: 33 (as of 2026)
- First winner: Hendrik Redant (BEL)
- Most wins: Claudio Chiappucci (ITA); Sergio Barbero (ITA) (3 wins)
- Most recent: Quinn Simmons (USA)

The Japan Cup Cycle Road Race is an annual professional road bicycle racing classic one-day race held in the city of Utsunomiya in Japan since 1992. The race usually held in October each year. It is sanctioned by the International Cycling Union (UCI) as a 1.Pro race as part of the UCI ProSeries.

== History ==
The race is held since 1992 at a circuit around the Utsunomiya Forest Park where 1990 UCI Road World Championships took place.

Japan Cup was a round of 1996 UCI Road World Cup.

Since 2008, it was a 1.HC (hors category) race as part of the UCI Asia Tour. It became 1.Pro race since the start of UCI ProSeries in 2020, although the race was canceled in that year due to the COVID-19 pandemic.

Since 2010, an exhibition criterium race Japan Cup Criterium is held in downtown Utsunomiya on the day before the UCI road race. It is a CRTP (Pro Criterium) race since 2022.

== Past winners ==
Year	Country	Rider	Team
1992	Belgium	Hendrik Redant	Lotto–Mavic–MBK
1993	Italy	Claudio Chiappucci	Carrera Jeans–Tassoni
1994	Italy	Claudio Chiappucci	Carrera Jeans–Tassoni
1995	Italy	Claudio Chiappucci	Carrera Jeans–Tassoni
1996	Switzerland	Mauro Gianetti	Team Polti
1997	Japan	Yoshiyuki Abe	Mapei–GB
1998	Belgium	Fabien De Waele	Lotto–Mobistar
1999	Italy	Sergio Barbero	Mercatone Uno–Bianchi
2000	Italy	Massimo Codol	Lampre–Daikin
2001	Italy	Gilberto Simoni	Lampre–Daikin
2002	Italy	Sergio Barbero	Lampre–Daikin
2003	Italy	Sergio Barbero	Lampre
2004	Germany	Patrik Sinkewitz	Quick-Step–Davitamon
2005	Italy	Damiano Cunego	Lampre–Caffita
2006	Italy	Riccardo Riccò	Saunier Duval–Prodir
2007	Italy	Manuele Mori	Saunier Duval–Prodir
2008	Italy	Damiano Cunego	Lampre
2009	Denmark	Chris Anker Sørensen	Team Saxo Bank
2010	Ireland	Dan Martin	Garmin–Transitions
2011	Australia	Nathan Haas	Genesys Wealth Advisers
2012	Italy	Ivan Basso	Liquigas–Cannondale
2013	New Zealand	Jack Bauer	Garmin–Sharp
2014	Australia	Nathan Haas	Garmin–Sharp
2015	Netherlands	Bauke Mollema	Trek Factory Racing
2016	Italy	Davide Villella	Cannondale–Drapac
2017	Italy	Marco Canola	Nippo–Vini Fantini
2018	Australia	Rob Power	Mitchelton–Scott
2019	Netherlands	Bauke Mollema	Trek–Segafredo
2020	No race due to the COVID-19 pandemic		
2021	No race due to the COVID-19 pandemic		
2022	United States	Neilson Powless	EF Education–EasyPost
2023	Portugal	Rui Costa	Intermarché–Circus–Wanty
2024	United States	Neilson Powless	EF Education–EasyPost
2025	France	Lenny Martinez	Team Bahrain Victorious
2026	United States	Quinn Simmons	Lidl–Trek
