= Tour de Hokkaido =

Japanese multi-day road cycling race

Race details
- Date: September
- Region: Hokkaido, Japan
- English name: Tour of Hokkaido
- Local name: ツール・ド・北海道 (in Japanese)
- Discipline: Road
- Competition: UCI Asia Tour 2.2
- Type: Stage race
- Organiser: Tour de Hokkaido Association
- Web site: www.tour-de-hokkaido.or.jp

History
- First edition: 1987
- Editions: 33 (as of 2022)
- First winner: Matsuyoshi Takahashi (JPN)
- Most wins: Daisuke Imanaka (JPN) (3 wins)
- Most recent: Yusuke Kadota (JPN)

The Tour de Hokkaido is an annual professional road bicycle racing stage race held in Hokkaido, Japan since 1987 as part of the UCI Asia Tour. It is rated by the International Cycling Union (UCI) as a 2.2 category race.

The event for 2018 was canceled due to the earthquake which occurred the day before the race. In 2020 and 2021, the race was canceled due to COVID-19 pandemic.

In 2023, a car on the course killed a participant during the 1st stage, leading to the cancellation of the rest of the race.

== Past winners ==
=== General classification ===
Year	Country	Rider	Team
1987	Japan	Matsuyoshi Takahashi	
1988	Japan	Kazuya Hashizume	
1989	Japan	Kazuo Ohishi	
1990	Japan	Daisuke Imanaka	
1991	Japan	Daisuke Imanaka	
1992	Ireland	Stephen Spratt	
1993	Japan	Daisuke Imanaka	
1994	Japan	Naoshi Ōno	
1995	Italy	Andrea Giudotti	
1996	Canada	Eric Wohlberg	
1997	Italy	Michele Colleoni	
1998	Japan	Hideto Yukinari	
1999	Japan	Ken Hashikawa	
2000	Canada	Eric Wohlberg	Shaklee
2001	Ireland	David McCann	Ceresit–CCC–Mat
2002	Italy	Simone Mori	Jura Suisse
2003	Japan	Satoshi Hirose	Nippon Hodo
2004	Hong Kong	Wong Kam-po	Sumita Ravanello Pi
2005	Italy	Eddy Ratti	Team Nippo
2006	Japan	Taiji Nishitani	Aisan Racing Team
2007	Germany	Henri Werner	Team Sachsen
2008	Japan	Takashi Miyazawa	Meitan Hompo-GDR
2009	Japan	Takashi Miyazawa	EQA-Meitan Hompo-Graphite Design
2010	Japan	Miyataka Shimizu	Bridgestone–Anchor
2011	Colombia	Miguel Ángel Rubiano	D'Angelo & Antenucci–Nippo
2012	Argentina	Maximiliano Richeze	Team Nippo
2013	France	Thomas Lebas	Bridgestone–Anchor
2014	Australia	Joshua Prete	Team Budget Forklifts
2015	Italy	Riccardo Stacchiotti	Nippo–Vini Fantini
2016	Japan	Nariyuki Masuda	Utsunomiya Blitzen
2017	Spain	Marcos García	Kinan Cycling Team
2018	No race due to 2018 Hokkaido Eastern Iburi earthquake		
2019	Italy	Filippo Zaccanti	Nippo–Vini Fantini–Faizanè
2020	No race due to COVID-19 pandemic		
2021	No race due to COVID-19 pandemic		
2022	Japan	Yusuke Kadota	EF Education–Nippo Development Team
2023	No race due to fatal accident in Stage 1		
2024	No race		
