= Tour of Japan =

Japanese multi-day road cycling race

Race details
- Date: May
- Region: Japan
- English name: Tour of Japan
- Local name: ツアー・オブ・ジャパン (in Japanese)
- Discipline: Road
- Competition: UCI Asia Tour 2.2
- Type: Stage race
- Organiser: Cycle Month Promotion Council
- Race director: Osamu Kurimura
- Web site: www.toj.co.jp

History
- First edition: 1996
- Editions: 28 (as of 2026)
- First winner: Jean-Philippe Duracka (FRA)
- Most wins: Fortunato Baliani (ITA); Samad Pourseyedi (IRI); Óscar Pujol (ESP) Nathan Earle (AUS) (2 wins)
- Most recent: Matteo Fabbro (ITA)

The Tour of Japan is an annual professional road bicycle racing stage race held in Japan since 1996 as part of the UCI Asia Tour. It is sanctioned by the International Cycling Union (UCI) as a 2.2 category race.

== History ==
Tour of Japan was formed as the successor of the Kokusai Cycle Road Race which began in 1982. In 1996, Tour of Japan began as a UCI category 2-5 stage race, and became category 2–4 in 1997. It was downgraded to category 2–5 in 2002.

As the UCI race system was reformed in 2005, it was included in the UCI Asia Tour as a category 2.2 event. It became a category 2.1 event in 2013.

The race has only been cancelled three times in its history. The 2003 edition was canceled for concern over the 2002–2004 SARS outbreak, and the 2011 edition was canceled because of the 2011 Tōhoku earthquake and tsunami. The 2020 edition was canceled due to the COVID-19 pandemic.

The 2021 edition was held as a class 2.2 event and a three-day stage race with all domestic teams, exempted by the UCI from the mandatory invitation of foreign teams under Japan's international travel restrictions. The 2022 edition was held as a four-stages, class 2.2 event. It restored the eight-stages class 2.1 form in 2023. The 2024 edition was held as the eight-stages, class 2.2 event.

== Past winners ==
=== General classification ===
| Year | Country | Rider | Team |
|---|---|---|---|
| 1996 | France | Jean-Philippe Duracka | France (national team) |
| 1997 | United States | Bart Bowen | Saturn |
| 1998 | United States | Frank McCormack | Saturn |
| 1999 | Poland | Andrzej Sypytkowski | Mróz |
| 2000 | Switzerland | Mauro Gianetti | Vini Caldirola-Sidermec |
| 2001 | Poland | Paweł Niedźwiecki | Mróz–Supradyn Witaminy |
| 2002 | Ukraine | Oleksandr Klymenko | Mróz–Supradyn Witaminy |
| 2003 | No race due to the SARS outbreak | | |
| 2004 | Japan | Shinichi Fukushima | Bridgestone Anchor |
| 2005 | Colombia | Félix Cárdenas | Barloworld |
| 2006 | Ukraine | Vladimir Duma | C.B. Immobiliare–Universal Caffè |
| 2007 | Italy | Francesco Masciarelli | Acqua & Sapone–Caffè Mokambo |
| 2008 | Australia | Cameron Meyer | SouthAustralia.com–AIS |
| 2009 | Spain | Sergio Pardilla | Carmiooro A Style |
| 2010 | Italy | Cristiano Salerno | De Rosa–Stac Plastic |
| 2011 | No race due to the Tōhoku earthquake and tsunami | | |
| 2012 | Italy | Fortunato Baliani | Team Nippo |
| 2013 | Italy | Fortunato Baliani | Team Nippo–De Rosa |
| 2014 | Iran | Samad Pourseyedi | Tabriz Petrochemical Team |
| 2015 | Iran | Samad Pourseyedi | Tabriz Petrochemical Team |
| 2016 | Spain | Óscar Pujol | Team Ukyo |
| 2017 | Spain | Óscar Pujol | Team Ukyo |
| 2018 | Spain | Marcos García | Kinan Cycling Team |
| 2019 | Australia | Chris Harper | Team BridgeLane |
| 2020 | No race due to the COVID-19 pandemic | | |
| 2021 | Japan | Nariyuki Masuda | Utsunomiya Blitzen |
| 2022 | Australia | Nathan Earle | Team Ukyo |
| 2023 | Australia | Nathan Earle | JCL Team Ukyo |
| 2024 | Italy | Giovanni Carboni | JCL Team Ukyo |
| 2025 | Italy | Alessandro Fancellu | JCL Team Ukyo |
| 2026 | Italy | Matteo Fabbro | Solution Tech NIPPO Rali |
