= 2020 UCI Asia Tour =

- Sixteenth edition of the UCI Asia Tour

Details
- Dates: 2 November 2019–11 October 2020
- Location: Asia
- Races: 11

Champions
- Individual champion: Alexey Lutsenko (KAZ) (Astana)
- Teams' champion: Team Sapura Cycling
- Nations' champion: Kazakhstan

The 2020 UCI Asia Tour was the 16th season of the UCI Asia Tour. The season has begun on 2 November 2019 with the Tour de Singkarak and ended on 11 October 2020.

The points leader, based on the cumulative results of previous races, wears the UCI Asia Tour cycling jersey.

Throughout the season, points are awarded to the top finishers of stages within stage races and the final general classification standings of each of the stages races and one-day events. The quality and complexity of a race also determines how many points are awarded to the top finishers, the higher the UCI rating of a race, the more points are awarded.

The UCI ratings from highest to lowest are as follows:

- Multi-day events: 2.Pro, 1.Pro, 2.1, 2.2 and 1.2

== Events ==
=== 2019 ===
Date	Race Name	Location	UCI Rating	Winner	Team	Ref.
2–10 November	Tour de Singkarak	Indonesia	2.2	Jesse Ewart (AUS)	Team Sapura Cycling	
8–10 November	Tour of Quanzhou Bay	China	2.2	Ryan Cavanagh (AUS)	St George Continental Cycling Team	
10 November	Tour de Okinawa	Japan	1.2	Nariyuki Masuda (JPN)	Utsunomiya Blitzen	
17–23 November	Tour of Fuzhou	China	2.1	Artur Fedosseyev (KAZ)	Shenzhen Xidesheng Cycling Team	
18–22 December	Tour de Selangor	Malaysia	2.2	Marcus Culey (AUS)	Team Sapura Cycling	

=== 2020 ===
Date	Race Name	Location	UCI Rating	Winner	Team	Ref.
4–6 January	Cambodia Bay Cycling Tour	Cambodia	2.2	Ariya Phounsavath (LAO)	Laos (national team)	
4–8 February	Saudi Tour	Saudi Arabia	2.1	Phil Bauhaus (DEU)	Bahrain–McLaren	
7–14 February	Tour de Langkawi	Malaysia	2.Pro	Danilo Celano (ITA)	Team Sapura Cycling	
15 February	Malaysian International Classic Race	Malaysia	1.1	Johan Le Bon (FRA)	B&B Hotels–Vital Concept	
1–5 March	Tour de Taiwan	Taiwan	2.1	Nicholas White (AUS)	Team BridgeLane	
6–11 October	Tour of Thailand	Thailand	2.1	Nikodemus Holler (DEU)	Bike Aid	
11–16 October	Tour of Taiyuan	China	2.2	Peng Xin (CHN)	China Continental Team of Gansu Bank	

== Final standings ==
=== Individual classification ===
Rank	Name	Points
1.	Alexey Lutsenko (KAZ)	531
2.	Yevgeniy Fedorov (KAZ)	221
3.	Hideto Nakane (JPN)	217
4.	Goh Choon Huat (SIN)	160
5.	Artur Fedosseyev (KAZ)	136
6.	Daniil Pronskiy (KAZ)	116
7.	Ilya Davidenok (KAZ)	114
8.	Matvey Nikitin (KAZ)	94
9.	Igor Chzhan (KAZ)	93
10.	Muhammad Nur Aiman Mohd Zariff (MAS)	92

=== Team classification ===
Rank	Team	Points
1.	(Malaysia) Team Sapura Cycling	1178
2.	(Malaysia) Terengganu Inc. TSG	721
3.	(Kazakhstan) Vino–Astana Motors	465
4.	(China) Ningxia Sports Lottery Continental Team	264
5.	(China) Yunnan Lvshan Landscape	254.34
6.	Thailand Continental Cycling Team	213
7.	(China) Hengxiang Cycling Team	160
8.	(China) SSOIS Miogee Cycling Team	143
9.	(Japan) Utsunomiya Blitzen	114
10.	(Japan) Aisan Racing Team	81

=== Nation classification ===
Rank	Nation	Points
1.	Kazakhstan	1364
2.	Japan	567
3.	Malaysia	310
4.	Thailand	277
5.	Singapore	273
6.	Uzbekistan	194
7.	Qatar	188
8.	Philippines	102
9.	Indonesia	99
10.	South Korea	84
