= 2020 Tour de Langkawi =

2020 UCI Asia Tour 2020 UCI ProSeries

Race details
- Dates: 6–14 February 2020
- Stages: 8
- Distance: 1,114.9 km (692.8 mi)
- Winning time: 26h 39' 58"

Results
Jersey awarded to the overall winner	Winner	Danilo Celano (ITA)	(Team Sapura Cycling)
	Second	Yevgeniy Fedorov (KAZ)	(Vino–Astana Motors)
	Third	Artem Ovechkin (RUS)	(Terengganu Inc. TSG)
Jersey awarded to the points classification winner	Points	Max Walscheid (GER)	(NTT Pro Cycling)
Jersey awarded to the mountains classification winner	Mountains	Muhammad Nur Aiman Mohd Zariff (MAS)	(Team Sapura Cycling)
	Team	Team Sapura Cycling	

The 2020 PETRONAS Tour de Langkawi was a professional road bicycle racing stage race held in Malaysia from 6 to 14 February 2020. It was the 25th edition of the Tour de Langkawi. The race was rated by the Union Cycliste Internationale (UCI) as a 2.Pro race as part of the 2020 UCI Asia Tour and the 2020 UCI ProSeries.

== Teams ==
Twenty-one teams, which consisted of one UCI WorldTeam, five UCI Professional Continental teams, fourteen UCI Continental teams, and one national team, were invited to the race. Each team entered six riders, except for Androni Giocattoli–Sidermec and Team BridgeLane, which each entered five. Of the 123 riders who started the race, 107 finished.

UCI WorldTeams

- NTT Pro Cycling

UCI Professional Continental Teams

- Androni Giocattoli–Sidermec
- Bardiani–CSF–Faizanè
- B&B Hotels–Vital Concept
- Nippo–Delko–One Provence
- Vini Zabù–KTM

UCI Continental Teams

- Aisan Racing Team
- ARA Pro Racing Sunshine Coast
- HKSI Pro Cycling Team
- KSPO Professional
- PGN Road Cycling Team
- SSOIS Miogee Cycling Team
- St George Continental Cycling Team
- Team BridgeLane
- Team Sapura Cycling
- Terengganu Inc. TSG
- Thailand Continental Cycling Team
- Utsunomiya Blitzen
- Vino–Astana Motors
- Wildlife Generation Pro Cycling

National Teams

- Malaysia

== Route ==
East Malaysian states Sabah and Sarawak returned as stage hosts for this edition, 23 years after the 1997 edition. In addition to 8 stages covering a distance of 1,114.9 km (692.8 mi), two additional stages are also held in conjunction with the 25th anniversary since the first edition of the race in 1996. A criterium international race was held in Kota Kinabalu a day before the first stage that targeted Under–23 (U23) professional/independent elite riders, while a Malaysian classic race dubbed the "Race of Champions" was held in Langkawi the day after the final stage.

Stage schedule
Stage	Date	Route	Distance	Type	Winner
Pre-Race	6 February	Kota Kinabalu, Sabah Criterium	86.7 km (53.9 mi)	Flat stage	Max Walscheid (GER)
1	7 February	Kuching, Sarawak	96.2 km (59.8 mi)	Flat stage	Yevgeniy Fedorov (KAZ)
2	8 February	Kuala Terengganu to Kerteh, Terengganu	175.5 km (109.1 mi)	Flat stage	Taj Jones (AUS)
3	9 February	Temerloh, Pahang to KLCC, Kuala Lumpur	162.5 km (101.0 mi)	Hilly stage	Max Walscheid (GER)
4	10 February	Putrajaya to Genting Highlands, Pahang	124.7 km (77.5 mi)	Mountain stage	Kevin Rivera (CRC)
5	11 February	Kuala Kubu Bharu, Selangor to Ipoh, Perak	165.8 km (103.0 mi)	Hilly stage	Harrif Saleh (MAS)
6	12 February	Taiping, Perak, Perak to Penang Island	150.9 km (93.8 mi)	Flat stage	Hideto Nakane (JPN)
7	13 February	Bagan, Penang to Alor Setar, Kedah	130.4 km (81.0 mi)	Flat stage	Harrif Saleh (MAS)
8	14 February	Langkawi, Kedah (Dataran Lang – Kuah)	108.5 km (67.4 mi)	Flat stage	Max Walscheid (GER)
Post-Race	15 February	Langkawi, Kedah Classic "Race of Champions"	159.0 km (98.8 mi)	Flat stage	Johan Le Bon (FRA)
Total		1,114.9 km (692.8 mi)			

== Stages ==
=== Pre-Race Criterium ===
6 February 2020 — Kota Kinabalu, Sabah, 86.7 km (53.9 mi)

Resorts World Genting Kota Kinabalu International Criterium Result
Rank	Rider	Team	Time
1	Max Walscheid (GER)	NTT Pro Cycling	1h 42' 01"
2	Harrif Saleh (MAS)	Terengganu Inc. TSG	+ 0"
3	Blake Quick (AUS)	St George Continental Cycling Team	+ 0"
4	Matteo Pelucchi (ITA)	Bardiani–CSF–Faizanè	+ 0"
5	Jérémy Lecroq (FRA)	B&B Hotels–Vital Concept	+ 0"
6	Dušan Rajović (SRB)	Nippo–Delko–One Provence	+ 0"
7	Taj Jones (AUS)	ARA Pro Racing Sunshine Coast	+ 0"
8	Riccardo Minali (ITA)	Nippo–Delko–One Provence	+ 0"
9	Luca Pacioni (ITA)	Androni Giocattoli–Sidermec	+ 0"
10	Giovanni Lonardi (ITA)	Bardiani–CSF–Faizanè	+ 0"

=== Stage 1 ===
7 February 2020 — Kuching, Sarawak, 96.2 km (59.8 mi)

Stage 1 Result
Rank	Rider	Team	Time
1	Yevgeniy Fedorov (KAZ)	Vino–Astana Motors	1h 51' 01"
2	Turakit Boonratanathanakorn (THA)	Thailand Continental Cycling Team	+ 3"
3	Ahmet Örken (TUR)	Team Sapura Cycling	+ 1' 17"
4	Max Walscheid (GER)	NTT Pro Cycling	+ 1' 17"
5	Matteo Pelucchi (ITA)	Bardiani–CSF–Faizanè	+ 1' 17"
6	Georgios Bouglas (GRE)	SSOIS Miogee Cycling Team	+ 1' 17"
7	Taj Jones (AUS)	ARA Pro Racing Sunshine Coast	+ 1' 17"
8	Giovanni Lonardi (ITA)	Bardiani–CSF–Faizanè	+ 1' 17"
9	Luca Pacioni (ITA)	Androni Giocattoli–Sidermec	+ 1' 17"
10	Harrif Saleh (MAS)	Terengganu Inc. TSG	+ 1' 17"

General classification after Stage 1
Rank	Rider	Team	Time
1	Yevgeniy Fedorov (KAZ)	Vino–Astana Motors	1h 50' 45"
2	Turakit Boonratanathanakorn (THA)	Thailand Continental Cycling Team	+ 9"
3	Ahmet Örken (TUR)	Team Sapura Cycling	+ 1' 29"
4	Ben van Dam (AUS)	Team BridgeLane	+ 1' 31"
5	Aiman Cahyadi (INA)	PGN Road Cycling Team	+ 1' 32"
6	Michael Vink (NZL)	St George Continental Cycling Team	+ 1' 32"
7	Bernard van Aert (INA)	PGN Road Cycling Team	+ 1' 32"
8	Max Walscheid (GER)	NTT Pro Cycling	+ 1' 33"
9	Matteo Pelucchi (ITA)	Bardiani–CSF–Faizanè	+ 1' 33"
10	Georgios Bouglas (GRE)	SSOIS Miogee Cycling Team	+ 1' 33"

=== Stage 2 ===
8 February 2020 — Kuala Terengganu to Kerteh, 175.5 km (109.1 mi)

Stage 2 Result
Rank	Rider	Team	Time
1	Taj Jones (AUS)	ARA Pro Racing Sunshine Coast	4h 05' 29"
2	Max Walscheid (GER)	NTT Pro Cycling	+ 0"
3	Jérémy Lecroq (FRA)	B&B Hotels–Vital Concept	+ 0"
4	Riccardo Minali (ITA)	Nippo–Delko–One Provence	+ 0"
5	Harrif Saleh (MAS)	Terengganu Inc. TSG	+ 0"
6	Matteo Pelucchi (ITA)	Bardiani–CSF–Faizanè	+ 0"
7	Tristan Ward (AUS)	Team BridgeLane	+ 0"
8	Georgios Bouglas (GRE)	SSOIS Miogee Cycling Team	+ 0"
9	Luca Pacioni (ITA)	Androni Giocattoli–Sidermec	+ 0"
10	Keigo Kusaba (JPN)	Aisan Racing Team	+ 0"

General classification after Stage 2
Rank	Rider	Team	Time
1	Yevgeniy Fedorov (KAZ)	Vino–Astana Motors	5h 56' 14"
2	Turakit Boonratanathanakorn (THA)	Thailand Continental Cycling Team	+ 9"
3	Taj Jones (AUS)	ARA Pro Racing Sunshine Coast	+ 1' 23"
4	Muhamad Nur Aiman Mohd Zariff (MAS)	Team Sapura Cycling	+ 1' 24"
5	Max Walscheid (GER)	NTT Pro Cycling	+ 1' 27"
6	Ahmet Orken (TUR)	Terengganu Inc. TSG	+ 1' 29"
7	Jérémy Lecroq (FRA)	B&B Hotels–Vital Concept	+ 1' 29"
8	Rylee Field (AUS)	Team BridgeLane	+ 1' 29"
9	Mattia Viel (ITA)	Androni Giocattoli–Sidermec	+ 1' 30"
10	Alessandro Iacchi (ITA)	Vini Zabù–KTM	+ 1' 31"

=== Stage 3 ===
9 February 2020 — Temerloh, Pahang to KLCC, Kuala Lumpur, 162.5 km (101.0 mi)

Stage 3 Result
Rank	Rider	Team	Time
1	Max Walscheid (GER)	NTT Pro Cycling	3h 51' 42"
2	Riccardo Minali (ITA)	Nippo–Delko–One Provence	+ 0"
3	Ahmet Örken (TUR)	Team Sapura Cycling	+ 0"
4	Georgios Bouglas (GRE)	SSOIS Miogee Cycling Team	+ 0"
5	Giovanni Lonardi (ITA)	Bardiani–CSF–Faizanè	+ 0"
6	Alec Cowan (CAN)	Rally Cycling	+ 0"
7	Jamalidin Novardianto (INA)	PGN Road Cycling Team	+ 0"
8	Luca Pacioni (ITA)	Androni Giocattoli–Sidermec	+ 0"
9	Mohamad Izzat Hilmi Abdul Halil (MAS)	Malaysia	+ 0"
10	Tristan Ward (AUS)	Team BridgeLane	+ 0"

General classification after Stage 3
Rank	Rider	Team	Time
1	Yevgeniy Fedorov (KAZ)	Vino–Astana Motors	9h 47' 56"
2	Turakit Boonratanathanakorn (THA)	Thailand Continental Cycling Team	+ 9"
3	Max Walscheid (GER)	NTT Pro Cycling	+ 1' 17"
4	Ahmet Örken (TUR)	Team Sapura Cycling	+ 1' 22"
5	Muhamad Nur Aiman Mohd Zariff (MAS)	Team Sapura Cycling	+ 1' 22"
6	Taj Jones (AUS)	ARA Pro Racing Sunshine Coast	+ 1' 23"
7	Bernard van Aert (INA)	PGN Road Cycling Team	+ 1' 27"
8	Georgios Bouglas (GRE)	SSOIS Miogee Cycling Team	+ 1' 28"
9	Rylee Field (AUS)	Team BridgeLane	+ 1' 29"
10	Aiman Cahyadi (INA)	PGN Road Cycling Team	+ 1' 32"

=== Stage 4 ===
10 February 2020 — Putrajaya to Genting Highlands, Pahang, 156.1 km (97.0 mi)

Stage 4 Result
Rank	Rider	Team	Time
1	Kevin Rivera (CRC)	Androni Giocattoli–Sidermec	4h 18' 55"
2	Danilo Celano (ITA)	Team Sapura Cycling	+ 10"
3	Artem Ovechkin (RUS)	Terengganu Inc. TSG	+ 43"
4	Pierpaolo Ficara (ITA)	Team Sapura Cycling	+ 1' 17"
5	Quentin Pacher (FRA)	B&B Hotels–Vital Concept	+ 1' 17"
6	Cristian Raileanu (MDA)	Team Sapura Cycling	+ 1' 40"
7	Hideto Nakane (JPN)	Nippo–Delko–One Provence	+ 1' 56"
8	Lorenzo Fortunato (ITA)	Vini Zabù–KTM	+ 2' 00"
9	Yevgeniy Fedorov (KAZ)	Vino–Astana Motors	+ 2' 07"
10	Carlos Quintero (COL)	Terengganu Inc. TSG	+ 2' 07"

General classification after Stage 4
Rank	Rider	Team	Time
1	Danilo Celano (ITA)	Team Sapura Cycling	14h 08' 28"
2	Yevgeniy Fedorov (KAZ)	Vino–Astana Motors	+ 30"
3	Artem Ovechkin (RUS)	Terengganu Inc. TSG	+ 35"
4	Quentin Pacher (FRA)	B&B Hotels–Vital Concept	+ 1' 13"
5	Pierpaolo Ficara (ITA)	Team Sapura Cycling	+ 1' 13"
6	Cristian Raileanu (MDA)	Team Sapura Cycling	+ 1' 36"
7	Hideto Nakane (JPN)	Nippo–Delko–One Provence	+ 1' 52"
8	Lorenzo Fortunato (ITA)	Vini Zabù–KTM	+ 1' 56"
9	Carlos Quintero (COL)	Terengganu Inc. TSG	+ 2' 03"
10	Francesco Manuel Bongiorno (ITA)	Vini Zabù–KTM	+ 2' 16"

=== Stage 5 ===
11 February 2020 — Kuala Kubu Bharu, Selangor to Ipoh, Perak, 165.8 km (103.0 mi)

Stage 5 Result
Rank	Rider	Team	Time
1	Harrif Saleh (MAS)	Terengganu Inc. TSG	3h 51' 42"
2	Max Walscheid (GER)	NTT Pro Cycling	+ 0"
3	Matteo Pelucchi (ITA)	Bardiani–CSF–Faizanè	+ 0"
4	André Looij (NED)	SSOIS Miogee Cycling Team	+ 0"
5	Taj Jones (AUS)	ARA Pro Racing Sunshine Coast	+ 0"
6	Luca Pacioni (ITA)	Androni Giocattoli–Sidermec	+ 0"
7	Ahmet Örken (TUR)	Team Sapura Cycling	+ 0"
8	Tristan Ward (AUS)	Team BridgeLane	+ 0"
9	Anuar Manan (MAS)	Malaysia	+ 0"
10	Gleb Brussenskiy (KAZ)	Vino–Astana Motors	+ 0"

General classification after Stage 5
Rank	Rider	Team	Time
1	Danilo Celano (ITA)	Team Sapura Cycling	17h 48' 20"
2	Yevgeniy Fedorov (KAZ)	Vino–Astana Motors	+ 30"
3	Artem Ovechkin (RUS)	Terengganu Inc. TSG	+ 35"
4	Quentin Pacher (FRA)	B&B Hotels–Vital Concept	+ 1' 13"
5	Pierpaolo Ficara (ITA)	Team Sapura Cycling	+ 1' 13"
6	Cristian Raileanu (MDA)	Team Sapura Cycling	+ 1' 36"
7	Hideto Nakane (JPN)	Nippo–Delko–One Provence	+ 1' 52"
8	Lorenzo Fortunato (ITA)	Vini Zabù–KTM	+ 1' 56"
9	Carlos Quintero (COL)	Terengganu Inc. TSG	+ 2' 03"
10	Francesco Manuel Bongiorno (ITA)	Vini Zabù–KTM	+ 2' 16"

=== Stage 6 ===
12 February 2020 — Taiping, Perak, Perak to Penang Island, 150.9 km (93.8 mi)

Stage 6 Result
Rank	Rider	Team	Time
1	Hideto Nakane (JPN)	Nippo–Delko–One Provence	3h 29' 15"
2	Gleb Brussenskiy (KAZ)	Vino–Astana Motors	+ 0"
3	Samuele Battistella (ITA)	NTT Pro Cycling	+ 4"
4	Quentin Pacher (FRA)	B&B Hotels–Vital Concept	+ 4"
5	Carlos Quintero (COL)	Terengganu Inc. TSG	+ 4"
6	Michael Vink (NZL)	St George Continental Cycling Team	+ 4"
7	Pierpaolo Ficara (ITA)	Team Sapura Cycling	+ 4"
8	Metkel Eyob (ERI)	Terengganu Inc. TSG	+ 4"
9	Ahmad Yoga Ilham Firdaus (INA)	PGN Road Cycling Team	+ 4"
10	Francesco Manuel Bongiorno (ITA)	Vini Zabù–KTM	+ 4"

General classification after Stage 6
Rank	Rider	Team	Time
1	Danilo Celano (ITA)	Team Sapura Cycling	21h 17' 33"
2	Yevgeniy Fedorov (KAZ)	Vino–Astana Motors	+ 26"
3	Artem Ovechkin (RUS)	Terengganu Inc. TSG	+ 35"
4	Pierpaolo Ficara (ITA)	Team Sapura Cycling	+ 1' 07"
5	Quentin Pacher (FRA)	B&B Hotels–Vital Concept	+ 1' 09"
6	Hideto Nakane (JPN)	Nippo–Delko–One Provence	+ 1' 34"
7	Cristian Raileanu (MDA)	Team Sapura Cycling	+ 1' 36"
8	Lorenzo Fortunato (ITA)	Vini Zabù–KTM	+ 1' 56"
9	Carlos Quintero (COL)	Terengganu Inc. TSG	+ 1' 59"
10	Francesco Manuel Bongiorno (ITA)	Vini Zabù–KTM	+ 2' 12"

=== Stage 7 ===
13 February 2020 — Bagan, Penang to Alor Setar, Kedah, 130.4 km (81.0 mi)

Stage 7 Result
Rank	Rider	Team	Time
1	Harrif Saleh (MAS)	Terengganu Inc. TSG	2h 53' 17"
2	Matteo Pelucchi (ITA)	Bardiani–CSF–Faizanè	+ 0"
3	Taj Jones (AUS)	ARA Pro Racing Sunshine Coast	+ 0"
4	Riccardo Minali (ITA)	Nippo–Delko–One Provence	+ 0"
5	Luca Pacioni (ITA)	Androni Giocattoli–Sidermec	+ 0"
6	Giovanni Lonardi (ITA)	Bardiani–CSF–Faizanè	+ 0"
7	Mohamad Izzat Hilmi Abdul Halil (MAS)	Malaysia	+ 0"
8	Tristan Ward (AUS)	Team BridgeLane	+ 0"
9	Kakeru Omae (JPN)	Aisan Racing Team	+ 0"
10	Ahmet Örken (TUR)	Team Sapura Cycling	+ 0"

General classification after Stage 7
Rank	Rider	Team	Time
1	Danilo Celano (ITA)	Team Sapura Cycling	24h 10' 50"
2	Yevgeniy Fedorov (KAZ)	Vino–Astana Motors	+ 26"
3	Artem Ovechkin (RUS)	Terengganu Inc. TSG	+ 35"
4	Pierpaolo Ficara (ITA)	Team Sapura Cycling	+ 1' 07"
5	Quentin Pacher (FRA)	B&B Hotels–Vital Concept	+ 1' 09"
6	Hideto Nakane (JPN)	Nippo–Delko–One Provence	+ 1' 34"
7	Cristian Raileanu (MDA)	Team Sapura Cycling	+ 1' 36"
8	Lorenzo Fortunato (ITA)	Vini Zabù–KTM	+ 1' 56"
9	Carlos Quintero (COL)	Terengganu Inc. TSG	+ 1' 59"
10	Francesco Manuel Bongiorno (ITA)	Vini Zabù–KTM	+ 2' 12"

=== Stage 8 ===
14 February 2020 — Langkawi, Kedah (Dataran Lang – Kuah), 108.5 km (67.4 mi)

Stage 8 Result
Rank	Rider	Team	Time
1	Max Walscheid (GER)	NTT Pro Cycling	2h 29' 08"
2	Luca Pacioni (ITA)	Androni Giocattoli–Sidermec	+ 0"
3	Taj Jones (AUS)	ARA Pro Racing Sunshine Coast	+ 0"
4	Muhammad Danieal Haikal Eddy Suhaidee (MAS)	Malaysia	+ 0"
5	Gleb Brussenskiy (KAZ)	Vino–Astana Motors	+ 0"
6	Kent Ross (USA)	Wildlife Generation Pro Cycling	+ 0"
7	Bernard van Aert (INA)	PGN Road Cycling Team	+ 0"
8	Giovanni Lonardi (ITA)	Bardiani–CSF–Faizanè	+ 0"
9	Keigo Kusaba (JPN)	Aisan Racing Team	+ 0"
10	Pierpaolo Ficara (ITA)	Team Sapura Cycling	+ 0"

General classification after Stage 8
Rank	Rider	Team	Time
1	Danilo Celano (ITA)	Team Sapura Cycling	26h 39' 58"
2	Yevgeniy Fedorov (KAZ)	Vino–Astana Motors	+ 26"
3	Artem Ovechkin (RUS)	Terengganu Inc. TSG	+ 35"
4	Pierpaolo Ficara (ITA)	Team Sapura Cycling	+ 1' 07"
5	Quentin Pacher (FRA)	B&B Hotels–Vital Concept	+ 1' 09"
6	Hideto Nakane (JPN)	Nippo–Delko–One Provence	+ 1' 34"
7	Cristian Raileanu (MDA)	Team Sapura Cycling	+ 1' 36"
8	Lorenzo Fortunato (ITA)	Vini Zabù–KTM	+ 1' 56"
9	Carlos Quintero (COL)	Terengganu Inc. TSG	+ 1' 59"
10	Francesco Manuel Bongiorno (ITA)	Vini Zabù–KTM	+ 2' 12"

=== Post-Race Classic ===
15 February 2020 — Langkawi, Kedah, 159 km (99 mi)

== Classification leadership table ==
Classification leadership by stage
Stage	Winner	General classification	Points classification	Mountains classification	Asian rider classification	Teams classification
1	Yevgeniy Fedorov	Yevgeniy Fedorov	Yevgeniy Fedorov	Ben Van Dam	Yevgeniy Fedorov	Vino–Astana Motors
2	Taj Jones	Yevgeniy Fedorov	Yevgeniy Fedorov	Muhammad Nur Aiman Mohd Zariff	Yevgeniy Fedorov	Vino–Astana Motors
3	Max Walscheid	Yevgeniy Fedorov	Max Walscheid	Muhammad Nur Aiman Mohd Zariff	Yevgeniy Fedorov	Vino–Astana Motors
4	Kevin Rivera	Danilo Celano	Max Walscheid	Muhammad Nur Aiman Mohd Zariff	Yevgeniy Fedorov	Team Sapura Cycling
5	Harrif Saleh	Danilo Celano	Max Walscheid	Muhammad Nur Aiman Mohd Zariff	Yevgeniy Fedorov	Team Sapura Cycling
6	Hideto Nakane	Danilo Celano	Max Walscheid	Muhammad Nur Aiman Mohd Zariff	Yevgeniy Fedorov	Team Sapura Cycling
7	Harrif Saleh	Danilo Celano	Max Walscheid	Muhammad Nur Aiman Mohd Zariff	Yevgeniy Fedorov	Team Sapura Cycling
8	Max Walscheid	Danilo Celano	Max Walscheid	Muhammad Nur Aiman Mohd Zariff	Yevgeniy Fedorov	Team Sapura Cycling
Final		Danilo Celano	Max Walscheid	Muhammad Nur Aiman Mohd Zariff	Yevgeniy Fedorov	Team Sapura Cycling

== Final standings ==
=== General classification ===
Final general classification (1–10)
Rank	Rider	Team	Time
1	Danilo Celano (ITA)	Team Sapura Cycling	26h 39' 58"
2	Yevgeniy Fedorov (KAZ)	Vino–Astana Motors	+ 26"
3	Artem Ovechkin (RUS)	Terengganu Inc. TSG	+ 35"
4	Pierpaolo Ficara (ITA)	Team Sapura Cycling	+ 1' 07"
5	Quentin Pacher (FRA)	B&B Hotels–Vital Concept	+ 1' 09"
6	Hideto Nakane (JPN)	Nippo–Delko–One Provence	+ 1' 34"
7	Cristian Raileanu (MDA)	Team Sapura Cycling	+ 1' 36"
8	Lorenzo Fortunato (ITA)	Vini Zabù–KTM	+ 1' 56"
9	Carlos Quintero (COL)	Terengganu Inc. TSG	+ 1' 59"
10	Francesco Manuel Bongiorno (ITA)	Vini Zabù–KTM	+ 2' 12"

=== Points classification ===
Final points classification (1–10)
Rank	Rider	Team	Points
1	Max Walscheid (GER)	NTT Pro Cycling	65
2	Taj Jones (AUS)	ARA Pro Racing Sunshine Coast	55
3	Harrif Saleh (MAS)	Terengganu Inc. TSG	44
4	Matteo Pelucchi (ITA)	Bardiani–CSF–Faizanè	32
5	Luca Pacioni (ITA)	Androni Giocattoli–Sidermec	30
6	Ahmet Örken (TUR)	Team Sapura Cycling	26
7	Riccardo Minali (ITA)	Nippo–Delko–One Provence	26
8	Yevgeniy Fedorov (KAZ)	Vino–Astana Motors	23
9	Gleb Brussenskiy (KAZ)	Vino–Astana Motors	22
10	Georgios Bouglas (GRE)	SSOIS Miogee Cycling Team	20

=== Mountains classification ===
Final mountains classification (1–10)
Rank	Rider	Team	Points
1	Muhamad Nur Aiman Mohd Zariff (MAS)	Team Sapura Cycling	34
2	Quentin Pacher (FRA)	B&B Hotels–Vital Concept	23
3	Samuele Battistella (ITA)	NTT Pro Cycling	18
4	Kevin Rivera (CRC)	Androni Giocattoli–Sidermec	15
5	Rylee Field (AUS)	Team BridgeLane	14
6	Pierpaolo Ficara (ITA)	Team Sapura Cycling	14
7	Sarawut Sirironnachai (THA)	Thailand Continental Cycling Team	12
8	Danilo Celano (ITA)	Team Sapura Cycling	12
9	Artem Ovechkin (RUS)	Terengganu Inc. TSG	10
10	Aiman Cahyadi (INA)	PGN Road Cycling Team	9

=== Asian rider classification ===
Final Asian rider classification (1–10)
Rank	Rider	Team	Time
1	Yevgeniy Fedorov (KAZ)	Vino–Astana Motors	26h 40' 24"
2	Hideto Nakane (JPN)	Nippo–Delko–One Provence	+ 40"
3	Ka Hoo Fung (HKG)	HKSI Pro Cycling Team	+ 3' 28"
4	Jamal Hibatullah (INA)	PGN Road Cycling Team	+ 4' 03"
5	Thanakhan Chaiyasombat (THA)	Thailand Continental Cycling Team	+ 4' 18"
6	Peerapol Chawchiangkwang (THA)	Thailand Continental Cycling Team	+ 4' 25"
7	Igor Chzan (KAZ)	Vino–Astana Motors	+ 4' 39"
8	Hiu Fung Choy (HKG)	HKSI Pro Cycling Team	+ 5' 20"
9	Matvey Nikitin (KAZ)	Vino–Astana Motors	+ 7' 02"
10	Nariyuki Masuda (JPN)	Utsunomiya Blitzen	+ 7' 51"

=== Teams classification ===
Final teams classification (1–10)
Rank	Team	Time
1	Team Sapura Cycling	80h 02' 45"
2	Terengganu Inc. TSG	+ 4' 48"
3	Thailand Continental Cycling Team	+ 9' 24"
4	Vino–Astana Motors	+ 10' 16"
5	HKSI Pro Cycling Team	+ 15' 51"
6	NTT Pro Cycling	+ 17' 24"
7	B&B Hotels–Vital Concept	+ 17' 34"
8	PGN Road Cycling Team	+ 17' 52"
9	Nippo–Delko–One Provence	+ 20' 53"
10	Wildlife Generation Pro Cycling	+ 23' 53"
