= 2020 Malaysian International Classic Race =

Cycling race

2020 UCI Asia Tour

Race details
- Dates: 15 February 2020
- Distance: 159 km (98.80 mi)
- Winning time: 3h 37' 03"

Results
	Winner	Johan Le Bon (FRA)	(B&B Hotels–Vital Concept)
	Second	Jesse Ewart (AUS)	(Team Sapura Cycling)
	Third	Lucas De Rossi (FRA)	(Nippo–Delko–One Provence)

The 2020 Malaysian International Classic Race was a road cycling one-day race that took place on 15 February 2020 in Malaysia, starting and finishing in Kuah, the capital of the Langkawi district in the state of Kedah. It was the inaugural edition of the Malaysian International Classic Race and was rated as a 1.1 event as a part of the 2020 UCI Asia Tour. This race was created initially as a one-off race to be a part of the festivities for the 25th anniversary of the Tour de Langkawi; however, organizers have expressed desires to make this race an annual event in the future.

The duo of French rider Johan Le Bon of B&B Hotels–Vital Concept and Australian rider Jesse Ewart of Team Sapura Cycling attacked late in the race and managed to stay in front, with Le Bon emerging victorious in the two-up sprint. French rider Lucas De Rossi of Nippo–Delko–One Provence placed third after winning the reduced bunch sprint behind.

== Teams ==
Twenty-one teams, which consisted of one UCI WorldTeam, five UCI Professional Continental teams, fourteen UCI Continental teams, and one national team, were invited to the race. These teams were the same teams that had just competed in the 2020 Tour de Langkawi, which finished the previous day. Each team entered six riders, except for Androni Giocattoli–Sidermec and Nippo–Delko–One Provence, which each entered five, and Team BridgeLane and Utsunomiya Blitzen, which each entered four. Of the 120 riders who started the race, only 28 finished.

UCI WorldTeams

- NTT Pro Cycling

UCI Professional Continental Teams

- Androni Giocattoli–Sidermec
- Bardiani–CSF–Faizanè
- B&B Hotels–Vital Concept
- Nippo–Delko–One Provence
- Vini Zabù–KTM

UCI Continental Teams

- Aisan Racing Team
- ARA Pro Racing Sunshine Coast
- HKSI Pro Cycling Team
- KSPO Professional
- PGN Road Cycling Team
- SSOIS Miogee Cycling Team
- St George Continental Cycling Team
- Team BridgeLane
- Team Sapura Cycling
- Terengganu Inc. TSG
- Thailand Continental Cycling Team
- Utsunomiya Blitzen
- Vino–Astana Motors
- Wildlife Generation Pro Cycling

National Teams

- Malaysia

== Result ==
Result
Rank	Rider	Team	Time
1	Johan Le Bon (FRA)	B&B Hotels–Vital Concept	3h 37' 03"
2	Jesse Ewart (AUS)	Team Sapura Cycling	+ 0"
3	Lucas De Rossi (FRA)	Nippo–Delko–One Provence	+ 5"
4	Matvey Nikitin (KAZ)	Vino–Astana Motors	+ 5"
5	Cristian Raileanu (MDA)	Team Sapura Cycling	+ 5"
6	Masakazu Ito (JPN)	Aisan Racing Team	+ 5"
7	Ryu Suzuki (JPN)	Utsunomiya Blitzen	+ 5"
8	Drew Morey (AUS)	Terengganu Inc. TSG	+ 5"
9	Cyril Gautier (FRA)	B&B Hotels–Vital Concept	+ 5"
10	Alex Hoehn (USA)	Wildlife Generation Pro Cycling	+ 5"
