= 2017 UCI Asia Tour =

Bicycle racing competition

- Thirteenth edition of the UCI Asia Tour

Details
- Dates: 22 October 2016–7 October 2017
- Location: Asia
- Races: 27

The 2017 UCI Asia Tour was the 13th season of the UCI Asia Tour. The season began on 22 October 2016 with the Tour of Hainan and ended on 7 October 2017.

The points leader, based on the cumulative results of previous races, wears the UCI Asia Tour cycling jersey.

Throughout the season, points are awarded to the top finishers of stages within stage races and the final general classification standings of each of the stages races and one-day events. The quality and complexity of a race also determines how many points are awarded to the top finishers, the higher the UCI rating of a race, the more points are awarded.

The UCI ratings from highest to lowest are as follows:

- Multi-day events: 2.HC, 2.1 and 2.2
- One-day events: 1.HC, 1.1 and 1.2

== Events ==
=== 2016 ===
Date	Race Name	Location	UCI Rating	Winner	Team	Ref
22–30 October	Tour of Hainan	China	2.HC	Alexey Lutsenko (KAZ)	Astana	
22–28 October	Sharjah International Cycling Tour	United Arab Emirates	2.1	Adil Jelloul (MAR)	Skydive Dubai–Al Ahli	
29 October	UAE Cup	United Arab Emirates	1.1	Siarhei Papok (BLR)	Minsk Cycling Club	
2 November	Tour of Yancheng Coastal Wetlands	China	1.2	Jakub Mareczko (ITA)	Wilier Triestina–Southeast	
5–12 November	Tour of Taihu Lake	China	2.1	Leonardo Duque (FRA)	Delko–Marseille Provence KTM	
13 November	Tour de Okinawa	Japan	1.2	Nariyuki Masuda (JPN)	Utsunomiya Blitzen	
16–20 November	Tour of Fuzhou	China	2.2	Rahim Ememi (IRI)	Pishgaman–Giant	

=== 2017 ===
Date	Race Name	Location	UCI Rating	Winner	Team	Ref
31 January–4 February	Dubai Tour	United Arab Emirates	2.HC	Marcel Kittel (GER)	Quick-Step Floors	
14–19 February	Tour of Oman	Oman	2.HC	Ben Hermans (BEL)	BMC Racing Team	
18–21 February	Tour de Filipinas	Philippines	2.2	Jai Crawford (AUS)	Kinan Cycling Team	
22 February–1 March	Tour de Langkawi	Malaysia	2.HC	Ryan Gibbons (RSA)	Team Dimension Data	
26–30 March	Tour de Taiwan	Taiwan	2.1	Benjamín Prades (ESP)	Team Ukyo	
31 March–2 April	Tour de Tochigi	Japan	2.2	Ben Hill (AUS)	Attaque Team Gusto	
1–6 April	Tour of Thailand	Thailand	2.1	Yevgeniy Gidich (KAZ)	Vino–Astana Motors	
13–16 April	Tour de Lombok	Indonesia	2.2	Nathan Earle (AUS)	Team Ukyo	
21–28 May	Tour of Japan	Japan	2.1	Óscar Pujol (ESP)	Team Ukyo	
1–4 June	Tour de Kumano	Japan	2.2	José Vicente Toribio (ESP)	Matrix Powertag	
14–18 June	Tour de Korea	South Korea	2.1	Min Kyeong-ho (KOR)	Seoul Cycling Team	
14–19 July	Tour de Flores	Indonesia	2.2	Thomas Lebas (FRA)	Kinan Cycling Team	
16–29 July	Tour of Qinghai Lake	China	2.HC	Yonathan Monsalve (VEN)	Qinghai Tianyoude Cycling Team	
25–27 August	Tour of Xingtai	China	2.2	Jacob Rathe (USA)	Jelly Belly–Maxxis	
8–10 September	Tour de Hokkaido	Japan	2.2	Marcos García (ESP)	Kinan Cycling Team	
8–15 September	Tour of China I	China	2.1	Liam Bertazzo (ITA)	Wilier Triestina–Selle Italia	
18–22 September	Tour de Moluccas	Indonesia	2.2	Marcus Culey (AUS)	St George Continental Cycling Team	
19–24 September	Tour of China II	China	2.1	Kevin Rivera (CRC)	Androni Giocattoli–Sidermec	
27–30 September	Tour de Ijen	Indonesia	2.2	Davide Rebellin (ITA)	Kuwait–Cartucho.es	
30 September – 1 October	Tour of Almaty	Kazakhstan	2.1	Alexey Lutsenko (KAZ)	Astana	
3–7 October	Jelajah Malaysia	Malaysia	2.2	Brendon Davids (RSA)	Oliver's Real Food Racing	
8 October	Sun Hung Kai Properties Hong Kong Challenge	Hong Kong	1.1	Matej Mohorič (SLO)	UAE Team Emirates	
8–13 October	Tour of Iran	Iran	2.1	Rob Ruijgh (NED)	Tarteletto–Isorex	
17–21 October	Tour de Selangor	Malaysia	2.2	Muhamad Zawawi Azman (MAS)	Team Sapura Cycling	
22 October	Japan Cup	Japan	1.HC	Marco Canola (ITA)	Nippo–Vini Fantini	
