= 2020 NTT Pro Cycling season =

NTT Pro Cycling
- 2020 season
- Status: UCI WorldTeam
- Manager: Brian Smith
- Main sponsor(s): Dimension Data
- Based: South Africa
- Bicycles: BMC

Season victories
- Stage race stages: 6
- National Championships: 2
- Most wins: Giacomo Nizzolo (4)
- Jersey

The 2020 season for the NTT Pro Cycling cycling team began in January at the Tour Down Under.

== Team roster ==
As of 1 January 2020

Rider	Date of birth
Carlos Barbero (ESP)	29 April 1991 (aged 28)
Samuele Battistella (ITA)	14 November 1998 (aged 21)
Edvald Boasson Hagen (NOR)	17 May 1987 (aged 32)
Victor Campenaerts (BEL)	28 October 1991 (aged 28)
Stefan de Bod (RSA)	17 November 1996 (aged 23)
Nicholas Dlamini (RSA)	12 August 1995 (aged 24)
Benjamin Dyball (AUS)	20 April 1989 (aged 30)
Enrico Gasparotto (ITA)	22 March 1982 (aged 37)
Amanuel Gebrezgabihier (ERI)	17 August 1994 (aged 25)
Ryan Gibbons (RSA)	13 August 1994 (aged 25)
Michael Gogl (AUT)	4 November 1993 (aged 26)
Shotaro Iribe (JPN)	1 August 1989 (aged 30)
Reinardt Janse van Rensburg (RSA)	3 February 1989 (aged 30)
Ben King (USA)	22 March 1989 (aged 30)

Rider	Date of birth
Roman Kreuziger (CZE)	6 May 1986 (aged 33)
Gino Mäder (SUI)	4 January 1997 (aged 22)
Louis Meintjes (RSA)	21 February 1992 (aged 27)
Giacomo Nizzolo (ITA)	30 January 1989 (aged 30)
Ben O'Connor (AUS)	25 November 1995 (aged 24)
Matteo Sobrero (ITA)	14 May 1997 (aged 22)
Andreas Stokbro (DEN)	8 April 1997 (aged 22)
Dylan Sunderland (AUS)	26 February 1996 (aged 23)
Jay Thomson (RSA)	12 April 1986 (aged 33)
Rasmus Tiller (NOR)	28 July 1996 (aged 23)
Michael Valgren (DEN)	7 February 1992 (aged 27)
Max Walscheid (GER)	13 June 1993 (aged 26)
Danilo Wyss (SUI)	26 August 1985 (aged 34)

Riders who joined the team for the 2020 season

Rider	2019 team
Carlos Barbero	Movistar Team
Samuele Battistella	Dimension Data for Qhubeka
Victor Campenaerts	Lotto–Soudal
Benjamin Dyball	Team Sapura Cycling
Michael Gogl	Trek–Segafredo
Shotaro Iribe	Shimano Racing Team
Matteo Sobrero	Dimension Data for Qhubeka
Andreas Stokbro	Riwal Readynez
Dylan Sunderland	Team BridgeLane
Max Walscheid	Team Sunweb

Riders who left the team during or after the 2019 season

Rider	2020 team
Lars Ytting Bak	Retired
Mark Cavendish	Bahrain–McLaren
Steve Cummings	Retired
Scott Davies	Bahrain–McLaren
Bernhard Eisel	Retired
Jacques Janse van Rensburg	Retired
Mark Renshaw	Retired
Tom-Jelte Slagter	B&B Hotels–Vital Concept
Jaco Venter	Retired
Julien Vermote	Cofidis

== Season victories ==
Date	Race	Competition	Rider	Country	Location
25 January	Tour Down Under, Stage 5	UCI World Tour	Giacomo Nizzolo (ITA)	Australia	Victor Harbor
8 February	Étoile de Bessèges, Stage 4	UCI Europe Tour	Ben O'Connor (AUS)	France	Mont Bouquet
9 February	Tour de Langkawi, Stage 3	UCI Asia Tour; UCI ProSeries	Max Walscheid (GER)	Malaysia	Kuala Lumpur
14 February	Tour de Langkawi, Stage 8	UCI Asia Tour; UCI ProSeries	Max Walscheid (GER)	Malaysia	Kuah
14 February	Tour de Langkawi, Points classification	UCI Asia Tour; UCI ProSeries	Max Walscheid (GER)	Malaysia	
9 March	Paris–Nice, Stage 2	UCI World Tour	Giacomo Nizzolo (ITA)	France	Châlette-sur-Loing
21 October	Giro d'Italia, Stage 17	UCI World Tour	Ben O'Connor (AUS)	Italy	Madonna di Campiglio

== National, Continental and World champions 2020 ==
Date	Discipline	Jersey	Rider	Country	Location
9 February	South African National Road Race Championships		Ryan Gibbons (RSA)	South Africa	Swadini Resort
23 August	Italian National Road Race Championships		Giacomo Nizzolo (ITA)	Italy	Cittadella
26 August	European Road Race Champion		Giacomo Nizzolo (ITA)	France	Plouay
