= Nur Aisyah Mohamad Zubir =

Malaysian cyclist

Nur Aisyah Zubir
Personal information
- Full name: Nur Aisyah binti Mohamad Zubir
- Born: 4 October 1997 (age 29) Kemaman, Terengganu, Malaysia

Cycling career
- Sport: Cycling
- Disciplines: Road; Track
- Role: Rider

Amateur team
- 2015-: Malaysia

Major wins
- One-day races and Classics National Road Race Championships (2021,2022,2023,2026) National Time Trial Championships (2019)
Medal record
Women's Track cycling
Representing Malaysia
Asian Cycling Championships
Silver medal – second place	2025 Nilai	Scratch race
Silver medal – second place	2025 Nilai	Points race
Islamic Solidarity Games
Silver medal – second place	2021 Konya	Scratch race
Bronze medal – third place	2021 Konya	Omnium
Southeast Asian Games
Gold medal – first place	2025 Thailand	Scratch race
Women's Road bicycle race
Representing Malaysia
Southeast Asian Games
Silver medal – second place	2021 Vietnam	Road race
Silver medal – second place	2021 Vietnam	Team road race
Bronze medal – third place	2021 Vietnam	Criterium
Bronze medal – third place	2023 Cambodia	Road race
Bronze medal – third place	2023 Cambodia	Criterium
Silver medal – second place	2025 Thailand	Road race
Silver medal – second place	2025 Thailand	Criterium

Nur Aisyah Mohamad Zubir (born 4 October 1997) is a Malaysian racing cyclist, competing in road and track events.

She represented Malaysia at the 2024 Olympic Games in road race, and also have won medals in the Southeast Asian Games.

== Major results ==
=== Track ===
2021
Islamic Solidarity Games

2nd Scratch Race
3rd Omnium

2025
Asian Cycling Championships

2nd Scratch Race
2nd Omnium

Southeast Asian Games

1st Scratch Race

=== Road ===
2019
National Road Championships

1st Time Trial
2nd Road Race

2020
National Road Championships

2nd Road Race

2021
National Road Championships

1st Road Race

2022
National Road Championships

1st Road Race

Southeast Asian Games

2nd Road Race
2nd Team Road Race
3rd Criterium

3rd Overall Tour of Thailand
2023
National Road Championships

1st Road Race

Southeast Asian Games

3rd Road Race
3rd Criterium

2nd Overall Tour of Thailand
2024
4th Overall Tour of Thailand
2025
8th Overall Tour of Thailand
Southeast Asian Games

2nd Road Race
2nd Criterium

Asian Cycling Championships

10th Road Race

2026
National Road Championships

1st Road Race

== See also ==
- List of Malaysian records in track cycling
