= Jahir Pérez =

Colombian road cyclist (born 1986)

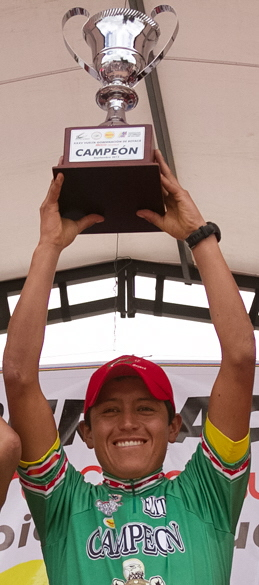
- Pérez at the 2013 Vuelta a Boyacá

Personal information
- Full name: Wilmar Jahir Pérez Muñoz
- Born: 8 November 1986 (age 39) Turmequé, Colombia

Cycling career
- Sport: Cycling
- Current team: EBSA–Indeportes Boyacá
- Discipline: Road
- Role: Rider

Amateur teams
- 2009–2010: EBSA
- 2012: Formesan–Bogotá Humana–Pinturas Bler
- 2013: EBSA–Indeportes Boyacá
- 2015: Aguardiente Néctar
- 2020–: EBSA–Indeportes Boyacá

Professional teams
- 2011: Colombia es Pasión–Café de Colombia
- 2016: Ningxia Sports Lottery–Focus Cycling Team
- 2017–2018: Team Sapura Cycling
- 2019: Deprisa Team

Wilmar Jahir Pérez Muñoz (born 8 November 1986) is a Colombian road cyclist, who currently rides for EBSA–Indeportes Boyacá.

== Major results ==
2010
1st Stage 3 Vuelta al Tolima
3rd Overall Clásica de Girardot

1st Stage 3

6th Overall Vuelta a Bolivia
2012
1st Stage 6 Clásico RCN
2013
1st Overall Vuelta a Boyacá

1st Stage 1

1st Stage 7 Clásico RCN
9th Overall Vuelta a Colombia
2015
2nd Overall Vuelta a Guatemala

1st Stage 7

2017
Jelajah Malaysia

1st Mountains classification
1st Stage 4

5th Overall Tour de Singkarak
7th Overall Tour de Lombok

1st Stage 3

7th Overall Tour de Selangor
2018
3rd Overall Tour de Lombok
2019
7th Overall Vuelta Independencia Nacional
10th Overall Vuelta a Guatemala
2022
2nd Overall Vuelta a Guatemala

1st Stage 3

5th Overall Vuelta al Táchira
