= Malaysian National Road Championships =

National road cycling championships in Malaysia

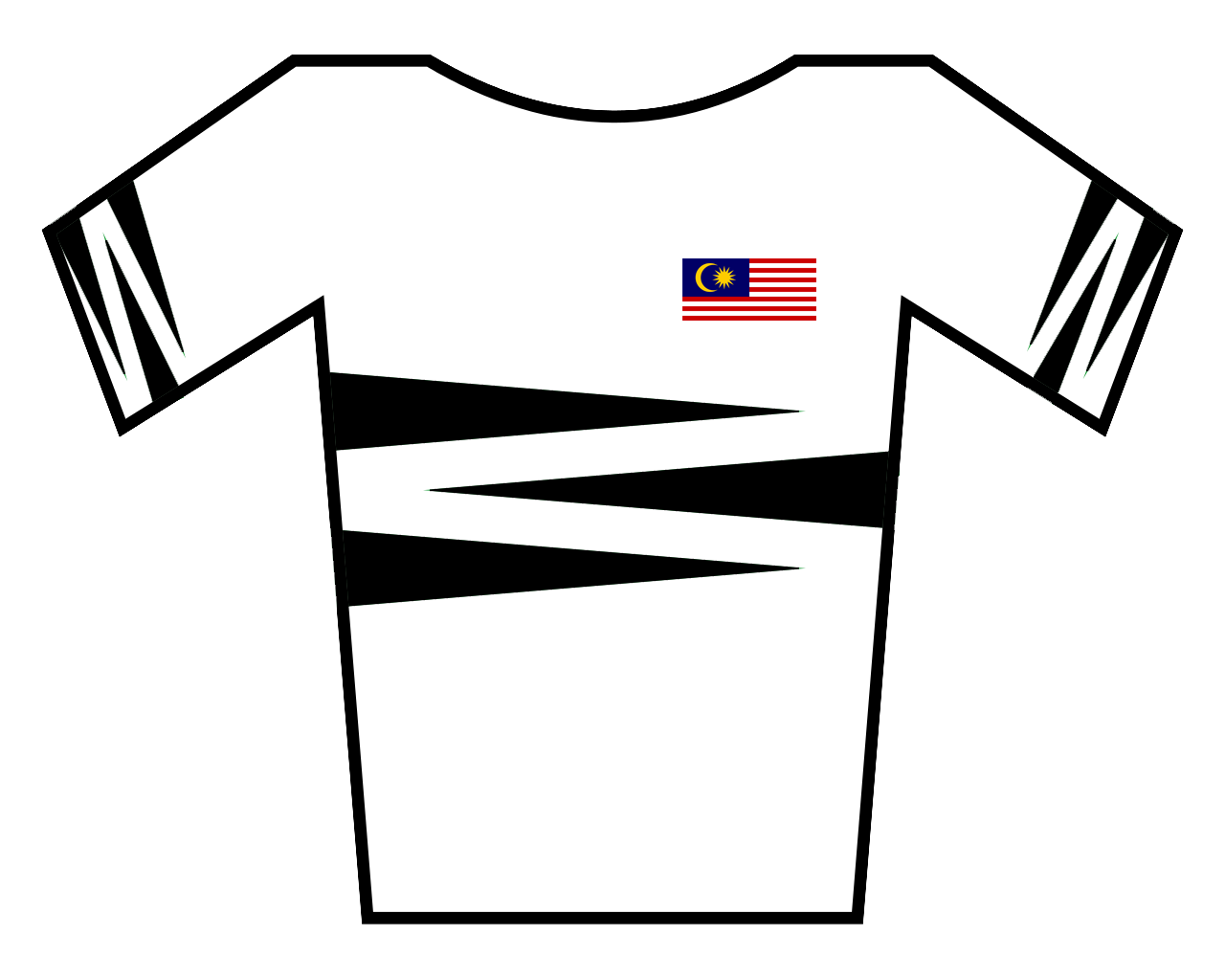

Race details
- Date: Various
- Local name: Kejohanan Berbasikal Lebuhraya Kebangsaan Malaysia
- Discipline: Road
- Type: One-day race
- Organiser: Malaysian National Cycling Federation

The Malaysian National Road Championships are held annually to decide the cycling champions in both the road race and time trial discipline, across various categories.

== Men ==
=== Road race ===
Year	Winner	Second	Third
2005	Jamaludin Amiruddin	Mohd Fauzan Ahmad Lutfi	Mohd Jasmin Ruslan
2006
2007
2008	Mohd Fauzan Ahmad Lutfi	Suhardi Hassan	Mohamed Faris Abdul Razak
2009	Wan Mohammed Najmee	Mohamed Hafiz Rosli	Mohamed Rhazif Salleh
2010	Adiq Husainie Othman	Mohd Shahrul Mat Amin	Ahmad Fahrullah Alias
2011	Mohd Shahrul Mat Amin	Mohd Zamri Saleh	Ali Ahmad Fallanie
2012	Mohd Zamri Saleh	Anwar Azis Muhd Shaiful	Mohd Nor Rizuan Zainal
2013	Mohd Shahrul Mat Amin	Nur Amirul Fakhruddin Mazuki	Adiq Husainie Othman
2014
2015	Nur Amirul Fakhruddin Mazuki	Mohd Nor Umardi Rosdi	Mohd Zamri Saleh
2016	Mohd Zamri Saleh	Mohd Harrif Salleh	Mohd Shahrul Mat Amin
2017
2018
2019	Nur Amirul Fakhruddin Mazuki	Akmal Hakim Zakaria	Sofian Nabil Omar Mohd Bakri
2020	Akmal Hakim Zakaria	Nur Amirul Fakhruddin Mazuki	Afiq Huznie Othman
2021	Mohamad Saari Amri Abd Rasim	Mohd Elmi Jumari	Irwandie Lakasek
2022	Muhsin Al Redha Misbah	Nur Amirul Fakhruddin Mazuki	Muhammad Danieal Haikal Eddy Suhaidee
2023	Mohamad Nur Aiman Zariff	Muhammad Nur Aiman Rosli	Irwandie Lakasek
2024	Nur Amirul Fakhruddin Mazuki	Muhamad Zawawi Azman	Muhammad Nur Aiman Rosli
2025	Muhammad Nur Aiman Rosli	Mohamad Nur Aiman Zariff	Muhammad Ameer Ahmad Kamal
2026	Mohamad Izzat Hilmi Abdul Halil	Nur Amirul Fakhruddin Mazuki	Muhamad Iqbal Daniel Mohd Nawawi

=== Time trial ===
Year	Winner	Second	Third
2012	Nik Mohd Azwan Zulkifle	Mohd Fauzan Ahmad Lutfi	Mohammad Saufi Mat Senan
2013	Mohd Fauzan Ahmad Lutfi	Mohd Nor Umardi Rosdi	Nur Amirul Fakhruddin Mazuki
2014
2015
2016	Mohd Nor Umardi Rosdi	Mohamed Nazri Mohamad	Mohd Shahrul Mat Amin
2017
2018
2019	Muhsin Al Redha Misbah	Muhamad Zawawi Azman	Mohd Nor Umardi Rosdi
2020	Muhammad Nur Aiman Rosli	Akmal Hakim Zakaria	Irwandie Lakasek
2021	Muhammad Nur Aiman Rosli	Muhammad Nur Aiman Zariff	Akmal Hakim Zakaria
2022	Muhammad Nur Aiman Rosli	Muhammad Shaiful Adlan Mohd Shukri	Muhammad Nur Aiman Zariff
2023	Muhammad Nur Aiman Rosli	Muhammad Nur Aiman Zariff	Nur Amirul Fakhruddin Mazuki
2024	Muhammad Nur Aiman Rosli	Muhamad Zawawi Azman	Muhammad Nur Aiman Zariff
2025	Muhammad Nur Aiman Rosli	Dealton Nur Arif Prayogo (INA)	Muhammad Nur Aiman Zariff
2026	Muhammad Nur Aiman Rosli	Kee Zhe Yie	Muhammad Yusri Shaari

== Women ==
Year	Road Race	Time Trial
2008	Noor Azian Alias	
2009	Noor Azian Alias	
2010	Mariana Mohammad	
2011	Kimberley Yap Fui Lui	
2012	Ju Pha Somnet	Mariana Mohammad
2013	Nur Syazwana Mohammad	Grace Phang Ching Zen
2014		
2015	Nurul Suhada Zainal	
2016	Nurul Alissa Mohamad	Grace Phang Ching Zen
2017		
2018		
2019	Ju Pha Somnet	Nur Aisyah Mohd Zubir
2020	Siti Nur Adibah Akma Mohd Fuad	Siti Nur Adibah Akma Mohd Fuad
2021	Nur Aisyah Mohd Zubir	Siti Nur Adibah Akma Mohd Fuad
2022	Nur Aisyah Mohd Zubir	Siti Nur Adibah Akma Mohd Fuad
2023	Nur Aisyah Mohd Zubir	Siti Nur Adibah Akma Mohd Fuad
2024	Nur Fitrah Shaari	Phi Kun Pan
2025	Nurul Nabilah Mohd Asri	Nyo Chi Hui
2026	Nur Aisyah Mohd Zubir	Intan Suraya Tokiman
