= Nur Aiman Mohd Zariff =

Malaysian cyclist

Personal information
- Full name: Muhammad Nur Aiman Mohd Zariff
- Born: 1 October 1997 (age 29)

Cycling career
- Sport: Cycling
- Current team: Terengganu Cycling Team
- Discipline: Road
- Role: Rider

Professional teams
- 2017: Terengganu Cycling Team
- 2018–2020: Team Sapura Cycling
- 2021–: Terengganu Cycling Team

Major wins
- One-day races and Classics National Road Race Championships (2023)
Medal record
Men's track cycling
Representing Malaysia
Southeast Asian Games
Gold medal – first place	2017 Kuala Lumpur	Men's team pursuit
Men's Road cycling
Representing Malaysia
Southeast Asian Games
Gold medal – first place	2021 Vietnam	Road race

Muhammad Nur Aiman Mohd Zariff (born 1 October 1997) is a Malaysian professional racing cyclist, who currently rides for UCI Continental team Terengganu Cycling Team. He has represented Malaysia in both road race and track cycling.

== Major results ==
2013
2nd Time trial, National Junior Road Championships
2017
1st Team pursuit, Southeast Asian Games
5th Overall Tour de Selangor
2018
6th Overall Tour of Indonesia
2019
6th Overall Tour of Peninsular
6th Overall Tour de Selangor

1st Young rider classification

2020
1st Mountains classification, Tour de Langkawi
2nd Overall Cambodia Bay Cycling Tour

1st Points classification

2021
2nd Time trial National Road Championships
2022
1st Mountains classification, Tour de Langkawi
2023
1st Road race National Road Championships
1st Road race, Southeast Asian Games
2024
3rd Time trial National Road Championships
2025
3rd Time trial National Road Championships
2nd Road race National Road Championships
2026
1st Classique of Mauritius
