= List of Malaysian records in track cycling =

The following are the national records in track cycling in Malaysia maintained by Malaysian National Cycling Federation (MNCF):

== Men ==
Event	Record	Athlete	Age	Date	Meet	Place	Ref
Flying 200 m time trial	9.402	Azizulhasni Awang	36 years, 215 days	7 August 2024	Olympic Games	Saint-Quentin-en-Yvelines, France	
250 m time trial (standing start)	17.716	Azizulhasni Awang	30 years, 234 days	27 August 2018	Asian Games	Jakarta, Indonesia	
Flying 500 m time trial							
500 m time trial	32.305	Muhammad Fadhil Mohd Zonis	20 years, 77 days	18 February 2018	Asian Championships	Nilai, Malaysia	
1 km time trial	1:00.305	Muhammad Fadhil Mohd Zonis	22 years, 87 days	28 February 2020	World Championships	Berlin, Germany	
1 km time trial (sea level)	1:00.305	Muhammad Fadhil Mohd Zonis	22 years, 87 days	28 February 2020	World Championships	Berlin, Germany	
Team sprint	43.934	Azizulhasni Awang; Muhammad Shah Firdaus Sahrom; Muhammad Fadhil Mohd Zonis	30 years, 234 days 22 years, 274 days 20 years, 267 days	27 August 2018	Asian Games	Jakarta, Indonesia	
4000 m individual pursuit	4:25.352	Mohd Eiman Firdaus Mohd Zamri	19 years, 244 days	28 August 2017	Southeast Asian Games	Nilai, Malaysia	
4000 m team pursuit	4:07.340	Abdul Azim Aliyas; Ariff Danial Noor Roseidi; Zulhelmi Zainal; Irwandie Lakasek		14 June 2023	Asian Championships	Nilai, Malaysia	
Hour record							

== Women ==
Event	Record	Athlete	Age	Date	Meet	Place	Ref
Flying 200 m time trial	10.578	Nurul Izzah Izzati Mohd Asri	21 years, 185 days	15 March 2025	Nations Cup	Konya, Turkey	
250 m time trial (standing start)	18.284	Anis Rosidi	25 years, 145 days	14 June 2023	Asian Championships	Nilai, Malaysia	
500 m time trial	34.226	Nurul Izzah Izzati Mohd Asri	19 years, 281 days	19 June 2023	Asian Championships	Nilai, Malaysia	
500 m time trial (sea level)	34.226	Nurul Izzah Izzati Mohd Asri	19 years, 281 days	19 June 2023	Asian Championships	Nilai, Malaysia	
1 km time trial	1:06.229	Nurul Izzah Izzati Mohd Asri	21 years, 168 days	26 February 2025	Asian Championships	Nilai, Malaysia	
Team sprint (500 m)	34.140	Fatehah Mustapa; Farina Shawati Mohd Adnan	28 years, 168 days 21 years, 41 days	27 August 2017	Southeast Asian Games	Nilai, Malaysia	
Team sprint (750 m)	48.023	Nurul Aliana Syafika Azizan; Nurul Izzah Izzati Mohd Asri; Nur Alyssa Mohd Farid	23 years, 70 days 23 years, 18 days	29 September 2026	Asian Games	Izu, Japan	
3000 m individual pursuit	3:47.638	Nur Aisyah Mohamad Zubir	23 years, 341 days	10 September 2021	Nations Cup	Cali, Colombia	
4000m individual pursuit	5:00.491	Yeong Zhen Yi		28 March 2026	Asian Championships	Tagaytay, Philippines	
3000 m team pursuit							
4000 m team pursuit	4:52.944	Khairunnisa Aleeya Saifulnizam; Noormastura Norman; Nur Syafika Natasha Kadir; Siti Nur Adibah Akma Mohd Fuad	23 years, 178 days	19 September 2022	Sukma Games	Nilai, Malaysia	

== Junior Men (under 19) ==
Event	Record	Athlete	Age	Date	Meet	Place	Ref
Flying 200 m time trial	10.309	Muhammad Firdaus Mohd Zonis	17 years, 342 days	11 February 2014	Junior World Championships	Gwangmyeong, South Korea	
1 km time trial	1:03.735	Amar Danial Masri	17 years, 299 days	19 February 2018	Asian Junior Championships	Nilai, Malaysia	
Team sprint	46.095	Mohd Shariz Efendi Shahrin; Mohd Khairil Nizam Rasol; Mohd Fadhil Mohd Zonis	18 years, 99 days 17 years, 362 days 17 years, 261 days	21 August 2015	Junior World Championships	Astana, Kazakhstan	
3000 m individual pursuit	3:20.665	New Joe Lau	18 years, 51 days	17 June 2023	Asian Junior Championships	Nilai, Malaysia	
4000 m team pursuit	4:13.110	Zulhelmi Zainal; Muhammad Shafiq Mohamad; Muhammad Hakimi Nor; Muhammad Shahmir Riduan Abdul Halim		17 February 2018	Asian Junior Championships	Nilai, Malaysia	

== Junior Women (under 19) ==
Event	Record	Athlete	Age	Date	Meet	Place	Ref
Flying 200 m time trial	11.743	Nur Alyssa Mohd Farid	17 years, 149 days	18 June 2023	Asian Junior Championships	Nilai, Malaysia	
500 m time trial	36.098	Nurul Aliana Syafika Azizan	19 years, 45 days	4 September 2021	Junior World Championships	Cairo, Egypt	
1 km time trial	1:10.818	Sawda Hasbullah		23 February 2025	Asian Junior Championships	Nilai, Malaysia	
Team sprint	52.979	Azwa Nabila Abdullah; Nyo Ci Hui; Yong Ann Tung	18 years, 77 days 18 years, 152 days 16 years, 175 days	18 June 2022	Asian Junior Championships	New Delhi, India	
2000 m individual pursuit	2:33.075	Nyo Ci Hui	17 years, 230 days	4 September 2021	Junior World Championships	Cairo, Egypt	
4000 m team pursuit	4:59.247	Dahlia Hazwani Hasyim; Intan Suraya Tokiman; Ameera Alya Md Zahirrudin; Nurina Qistina Zahraa Dewa Indra		14 June 2023	Asian Junior Championships	Nilai, Malaysia	
