= Akmal Hakim Zakaria =

Malaysian cyclist

Personal information
- Full name: Akmal Hakim Zakaria
- Born: 25 September 1996 (age 30) Malaysia
- Height: 1.71 m (5 ft 7 1/2 in)
- Weight: 59 kg (130 lb; 9 st 4 lb)

Cycling career
- Sport: Cycling
- Current team: Malaysia Pro Cycling
- Discipline: Road
- Role: Rider

Professional teams
- 2015–2016: National Sports Council of Malaysia
- 2017–: Team Sapura Cycling

Major wins
- One-day races and Classics National Road Race Championships (2020)

Akmal Hakim Zakaria (born 25 September 1996) is a Malaysian professional racing cyclist, who currently rides for UCI Continental team Malaysia Pro Cycling.

== Major results ==
2017
1st Stage 2 Tour de Molvccas
2018
6th Overall Tour de Siak

1st Stage 4

2019
National Road Championships

2nd Road race
5th Time trial

2020
National Road Championships

1st Road race
2nd Time trial

2021
3rd Time trial National Road Championships
