= Elmi Jumari =

Malaysian cyclist

Personal information
- Full name: Muhammad Elmi bin Jumari
- Born: 4 January 1990 (age 36) Selayang, Selangor, Malaysia

Cycling career
- Sport: Cycling
- Disciplines: Road; Track; BMX
- Role: Sprinter

Amateur teams
- 2015-2023: Polis Diraja Malaysia Cycling Team
- 2024: Jiangxi Sava Racing Team
- 2025-: Polis Diraja Malaysia Cycling Team

Muhammad Elmi bin Jumari (born 4 January 1990) is a Malaysian racing cyclist, competing in road, track and BMX events.

He won two stages of the 2017 Tour de Selangor, a UCI 2.2 rated event. In the 2024 Tour de Langkawi, he was involved in a horrific crash in stage 2 while in a bunch sprint to the finish line, suffering a broken collarbone and a broken finger which required surgery. He was fined 200 Swiss francs by the race commissaires for obstructing another rider in the leadup to the crash.

== Major results ==
=== Road ===
2016
8th Road race, Malaysian National Road Championships
2017
Tour de Selangor

1st Stages 2 & 4

2019
5th Road race, Malaysian National Road Championships
2021
2nd Road race, Malaysian National Road Championships
2023
9th Road race, Malaysian National Road Championships
