= Pierpaolo Ficara =

Italian cyclist

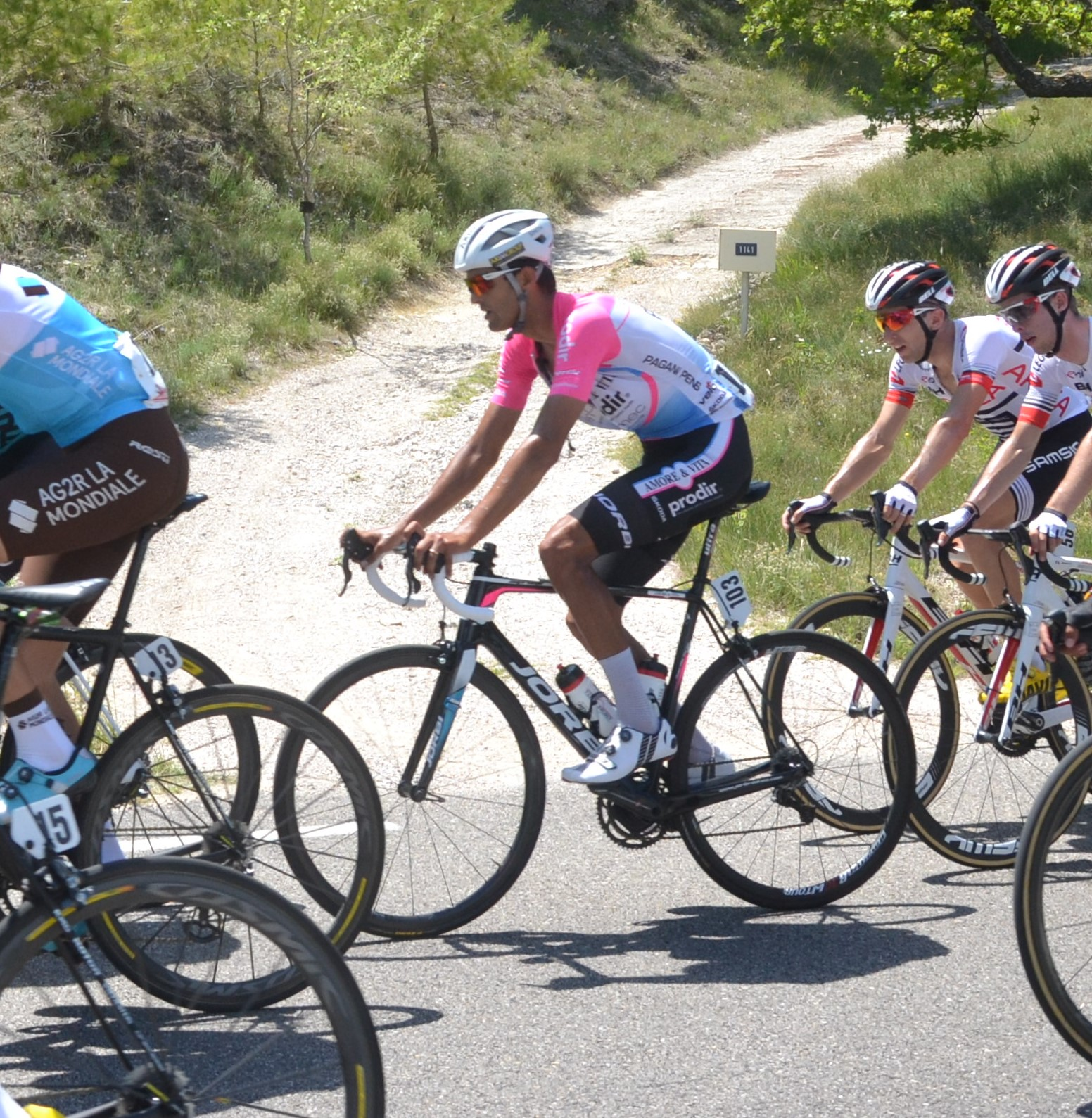
- Ficara in 2019

Personal information
- Full name: Pierpaolo Ficara
- Born: 16 February 1992 (age 34) Syracuse, Sicily, Italy

Cycling career
- Sport: Cycling
- Current team: Rolling Bike
- Disciplines: Road; Mountain biking
- Role: Rider

Amateur teams
- 2012: Marchiol–Emisfero–Site
- 2013–2014: Maltinti Lampadari–Banca di Cambiano
- 2015: Futura Matricardi
- 2022–: Rolling Bike

Professional teams
- 2016–2019: Amore & Vita–Selle SMP
- 2020–2021: Team Sapura Cycling

Pierpaolo Ficara (born 16 February 1992 in Syracuse) is an Italian cyclist, who currently rides for Italian amateur team Rolling Bike.

== Major results ==
2015
4th Gran Premio Industrie del Marmo
10th Trofeo Edil C
2016
4th Giro dell'Appennino
2017
1st Fenkil Northern Red Sea Challenge
2nd Overall Tour of Albania

1st Points classification
1st Stage 1

4th Overall Tour du Jura

1st Stage 2

7th Pro Ötztaler 5500
2018
3rd Overall Tour of Almaty

1st Mountains classification

5th Coppa Ugo Agostoni
2019
2nd Overall Tour de Savoie Mont-Blanc
4th Giro della Toscana
7th Overall Tour of Almaty
7th Overall Sibiu Cycling Tour
7th Mont Ventoux Dénivelé Challenge
2020
4th Overall Tour de Langkawi
6th Grand Prix Velo Alanya
