= 2017 Handzame Classic =

2017 UCI Europe Tour

Race details
- Dates: 17 March 2017
- Stages: 1
- Distance: 197.7 km (122.8 mi)
- Winning time: 4h 15' 31"

Results
	Winner	Kristoffer Halvorsen (NOR)
	Second	Adam Blythe (GBR)
	Third	Kenny Dehaes (BEL)

The 2017 Handzame Classic was the 7th edition of the Handzame Classic road cycling one day race. It was held on 17 March 2017 as part of the 2017 UCI Europe Tour in category 1.1.

The race was won by Kristoffer Halvorsen of Joker Icopal.

== Teams ==
Twenty-two teams of up to eight riders started the race:

UCI WorldTeams

- Bora–Hansgrohe
- Lotto–Soudal
- Team Katusha–Alpecin
- Quick-Step Floors

UCI Professional Continental teams

- Aqua Blue Sport
- Gazprom–RusVelo
- Nippo–Vini Fantini
- Sport Vlaanderen–Baloise
- Wanty–Groupe Gobert
- CCC–Sprandi–Polkowice
- Israel Cycling Academy
- Roompot–Nederlandse Loterij
- Vérandas Willems–Crelan
- WB Veranclassic Aqua Protect

UCI Continental teams

- An Post–Chain Reaction
- Team Coop
- Leopard Pro Cycling
- Pauwels Sauzen–Vastgoedservice
- Cibel–Cebon
- Joker Icopal
- Tarteletto–Isorex
- Development Team Sunweb

== Result ==
Final general classification

Rank	Rider	Team	Time
1	Kristoffer Halvorsen (NOR)	Joker Icopal	4h 15' 31"
2	Adam Blythe (GBR)	Aqua Blue Sport	s.t.
3	Kenny Dehaes (BEL)	Wanty–Groupe Gobert	s.t.
4	Baptiste Planckaert (BEL)	Team Katusha–Alpecin	s.t.
5	Coen Vermeltfoort (NED)	Roompot–Nederlandse Loterij	s.t.
6	André Looij (NED)	Roompot–Nederlandse Loterij	s.t.
7	Roy Jans (BEL)	WB Veranclassic Aqua Protect	s.t.
8	Timothy Dupont (BEL)	Vérandas Willems–Crelan	s.t.
9	Jelle Mannaerts (BEL)	Tarteletto–Isorex	s.t.
10	Davide Martinelli (ITA)	Quick-Step Floors	s.t.
