= Muhamad Zawawi Azman =

Malaysian racing cyclist (born 1994)

Personal information
- Full name: Muhamad Zawawi Azman
- Born: 3 August 1994 (age 32)
- Height: 1.69 m (5 ft 7 in)
- Weight: 57 kg (126 lb)

Cycling career
- Sport: Cycling
- Current team: The Joyrun & Hurricane Cycling Team
- Discipline: Road
- Role: Rider

Professional teams
- 2015–2016: National Sports Council of Malaysia
- 2017–2025: Team Sapura Cycling
- 2026-: The Joyrun & Hurricane Cycling Team

Muhamad Zawawi Azman (born 3 August 1994) is a Malaysian professional racing cyclist, who currently rides for UCI Continental team The Joyrun & Hurricane Cycling Team.

== Major results ==
2015
1st Road race, National Under-23 Road Championships
2016
1st Stage 4 Jelajah Malaysia
3rd Time trial, National Under-23 Road Championships
2017
1st Overall Tour de Selangor

1st Stage 1

10th Overall Tour de Molvccas
2018
2nd Overall Tour de Lombok

1st Mountains classification
1st Stage 2

2019
1st Stage 9 Tour de Singkarak
2023
10th Tour of Thailand
