= Mario Vogt =

German cyclist (born 1992)

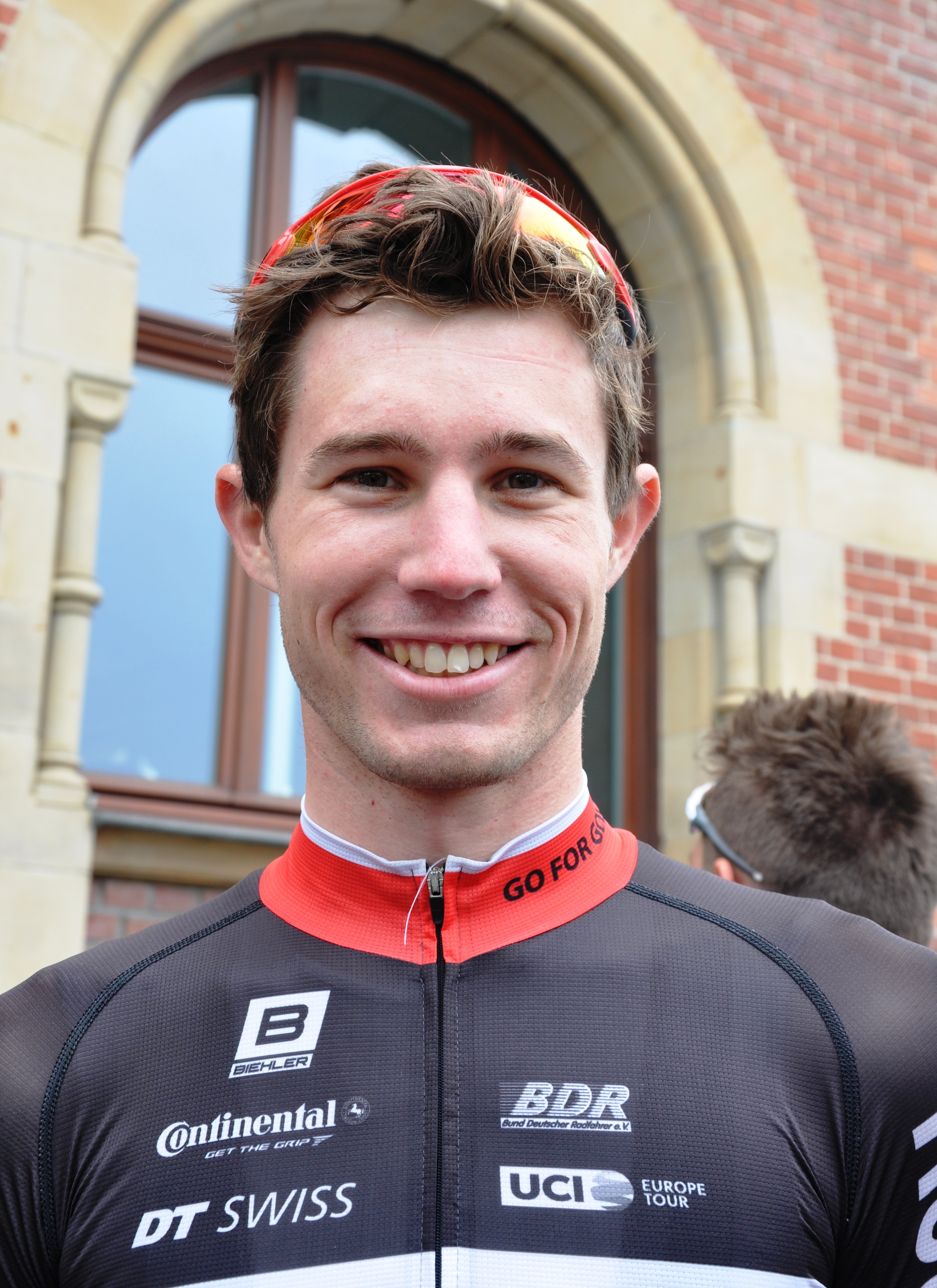
- Vogt in 2016

Personal information
- Full name: Mario Vogt
- Born: 17 January 1992 (age 34) Stuttgart, Germany

Cycling career
- Sport: Cycling
- Current team: RSC Schönaich
- Discipline: Road
- Role: Rider

Amateur teams
- 2005–2010: RSC Schönaich
- 2009: Team Maisch Sportswear
- 2010: Ghost Junior Team
- 2020–: RSC Schönaich

Professional teams
- 2011: Team Heizomat Mapei
- 2012: Team Specialized Concept Store
- 2013–2016: Rad-Net Rose Team
- 2017: Attaque Team Gusto
- 2018–2019: Team Sapura Cycling

Mario Vogt (born 17 January 1992 in Stuttgart) is a German cyclist, who currently rides for German amateur team RSC Schönaich.

== Major results ==
2008
1st Road race, National Novice Road Championships
2010
1st Overall Tour du Valromey

1st Stages 1 & 4

1st Overall Regio-Tour
2nd Overall Internationale Niedersachsen-Rundfahrt

1st Stage 1

3rd Overall Grand Prix Rüebliland
2014
4th Overall Memorial Grundmanna I Wizowskiego

1st Mountains classification
1st Young rider classification

2016
1st National Hill Climb Championships
1st Team time trial, National Road Championships
6th Overall Flèche du Sud
2017
8th Overall Tour de Tochigi
9th Overall Tour de Filipinas

1st Mountains classification

2018
5th Overall Tour of Cartier

1st Prologue

6th Overall Tour de Ijen
10th Overall Tour of Fatih Sultan Mehmet
2019
1st Overall Tour de Iskandar Johor
Tour de Filipinas

1st Points classification
1st Stages 2 & 5

2021
1st Stage 8 Tour du Faso
