= Siti Nur Adibah Akma Mohd Fuad =

Malaysian cyclist

Siti Nur Adibah Akma
Personal information
- Full name: Siti Nur Adibah Akma binti Mohd Fuad
- Born: 25 March 1999 (age 27)

Cycling career
- Sport: Cycling
- Disciplines: Road; Mountain biking
- Role: Rider

Amateur team
- 2020–: Johor A

Major wins
- One-day races and Classics National Road Race Championships (2020) National Time Trial Championships (2020,2021,2022,2023)
Medal record
Women's Road bicycle race
Representing Malaysia
Southeast Asian Games
Silver medal – second place	2021 Vietnam	Team road race

Siti Nur Adibah Akma Mohd Fuad (born 25 March 1999) is a Malaysian professional racing cyclist.

== Major results ==
2016
1st Ranau Mountainbike
National Road Championships

2nd Road race
3rd Time trial

1st Cross-country, Asian Junior Mountain Bike Championships
2017
3rd Downhill, National Mountain Bike Championships
2020
National Road Championships

1st Road Race
1st Time Trial

2021
National Road Championships

1st Time Trial

2022
National Road Championships

1st Time Trial

Southeast Asian Games

2nd Team Road Race

3rd Overall Tour of Thailand
2023
National Road Championships

1st Time Trial

== See also ==
- List of Malaysian records in track cycling
