= Masakazu Ito =

Japanese bicycle racer (born 1988)

Personal information
- Born: 12 June 1988 (age 38) Japan

Cycling career
- Sport: Cycling
- Current team: Ciel Bleu Kanoya
- Discipline: Road
- Role: Rider; Directeur sportif

Amateur teams
- 2010: Aisan Racing Team (stagiaire)
- 2022–: Ciel Bleu Kanoya

Professional teams
- 2011–2016: Aisan Racing Team
- 2017–2019: Nippo–Vini Fantini
- 2020–2021: Aisan Racing Team

Managerial team
- 2022–: Ciel Bleu Kanoya

Masakazu Ito (伊藤 雅和, Itō Masakazu; born 12 June 1988) is a Japanese cyclist, who currently rides for and manages Japanese amateur team Ciel Bleu Kanoya.

== Major results ==
2008
9th Overall Tour de Indonesia

1st Stages 4 & 9

2009
2nd Madison, Asian Track Championships (with Kazuhiro Mori)
2012
1st Stage 1 Tour de Singkarak
2013
4th Road race, National Road Championships
6th Overall Tour de East Java
10th Overall Tour de Taiwan
2015
9th Tour de Okinawa
10th Overall Tour de Kumano
10th Overall Tour de Hokkaido
2016
5th Overall Tour of Thailand
5th Overall Tour de Kumano
2020
6th Malaysian International Classic Race
2021
6th Overall Tour of Japan
6th Oita Urban Classic
8th Road race, National Road Championships
