= Mariana Mohammad =

Malaysian cyclist

Personal information
- Born: 18 May 1978 (age 48) Sabah, Malaysia

Cycling career
- Sport: Cycling
- Discipline: Road cycling

Major wins
- One-day races and Classics National Road Race Championships (2010)

Mariana Mohammad is a former road cyclist from Malaysia.

She was the 2010 Malaysia national champion in road race cycling, and represented her nation at the 2010 UCI Road World Championships. She also represented Malaysia in international events like the Southeast Asian Games, from 2009 until 2015, when she retired from the national team. Besides cycling, she also competed in triathlon and duathlon, representing Malaysia in both from 2005-2009 and from 2015-2021.

== Major results ==
=== Road cycling ===
2010
National Road Championships

1st Road Race

2012
National Road Championships

2nd Road Race

=== Duathlon ===
2019 Wenzhou ITU Multisport World Cup

2nd Duathlon
