= Mohamad Izzat Hilmi Abdul Halil =

Malaysian cyclist

Mohamad Izzat Hilmi
Personal information
- Full name: Mohamad Izzat Hilmi bin Abdul Halil
- Born: 18 September 1995 (age 31) Batu Pahat, Johor, Malaysia

Cycling career
- Sport: Cycling
- Current team: Malaysia Pro Cycling
- Discipline: Road
- Role: Sprinter

Amateur team
- 2019: Johor Darul Takzim Cycling Team

Professional teams
- 2017–2019: Team Sapura Cycling
- 2024–: Malaysia Pro Cycling

Major wins
- One-day races and Classics National Road Race Championships (2026)

Mohamad Izzat Hilmi bin Abdul Halil (born 18 September 1995) is a Malaysian professional racing cyclist, who currently rides for UCI Continental team Malaysia Pro Cycling.

He was formerly with MPC's prdecessor Team Sapura Cycling from 2017 to 2019, and also with the Malaysia national cycling team with whom he participated in several Tour de Langkawi races.

== Major results ==
2015
2nd Road race, National Under-23 Road Championships
2016
1st Road race, National Under-23 Road Championships
2018
1st Stage 3 Tour de Siak
2024
1st Stage 3 Tour de Siak
1st Points classification, Tour of Thailand

2026
1st Road race, Malaysian National Road Championships
