= Nur Aiman Rosli =

Malaysian cyclist

Personal information
- Full name: Muhammad Nur Aiman Bin Rosli
- Born: 22 March 1999 (age 27) Muar, Johor, Malaysia

Cycling career
- Sport: Cycling
- Current team: Terengganu Cycling Team
- Discipline: Road
- Role: Rider

Professional teams
- 2019: Brunei Continental Cycling Team
- 2020–2023: Team Sapura Cycling
- 2024–: Terengganu Cycling Team

Major wins
- One-day races and Classics National Time Trial Championships (2020,2021,2022,2023,2024,2025,2026) National Road Race Championships (2025)
Medal record
Representing (Malaysia) Malaysia
Men's road bicycle racing
Southeast Asian Games
Bronze medal – third place	2021 Hanoi	Time trial

Muhammad Nur Aiman Bin Rosli (born 22 March 1999) is a Malaysian professional racing cyclist, who currently rides for UCI Continental team Terengganu Cycling Team.

== Major results ==
2016
3rd Time trial, National Junior Road Championships
2019
6th Team time trial, Asian Road Championships
10th Time trial, National Under-23 Road Championships
2020
National Road Championships

1st Time trial
5th Road race

2021
1st Time trial, National Road Championships
2022
1st Time trial, National Road Championships
3rd Time trial, Southeast Asian Games
2023
National Road Championships

1st Time trial
2nd Road race

2024
National Road Championships

1st Time trial
3rd Road race

1st Stage 2 Tour of Thailand
2025
National Road Championships

1st Time trial
1st Road race

2026
National Road Championships

1st Time trial
