= Phi Kun Pan =

Malaysian cyclist

Personal information
- Full name: Phi Kun a/p Pan
- Born: Phikun Chumthong; 1 June 2003 (age 23) Baling, Kedah, Malaysia

Cycling career
- Sport: Cycling
- Disciplines: Road; Mountain bike
- Role: Rider

Amateur team
- 2025-: Nex Kedah Lokka Cycling Team

Major wins
- Mountain bike National Cross-Country Olympic Championships (2024, 2025, 2026) National Cross-Country Eliminator Championships (2025) National Cross-Country Short-Circuit Championships (2024, 2025) Road One-day races and Classics National Time Trial Championships (2024)
Medal record
Women's mountain bike racing
Representing Malaysia
Asian Mountain Bike Championships
Bronze medal – third place	2024 Putrajaya	U23 Cross-Country Olympic
Women's Road bicycle race
Representing Malaysia
Asian Cycling Championships
Gold medal – first place	2023 Rayong	U23 Road Race

Phi Kun a/p Pan, or Phikun Chumthong (born 1 June 2003) is a Malaysian racing cyclist. Of Thai descent, she competes in road and mountain bike events.

She won in the under-23 category of individual road race at the 2023 Asian Road Cycling Championships in Rayong, Thailand. In October 2026, Phi Kun qualified for the 2027 UCI Mountain Bike World Championships, after culmination of several good performances in the Asian Mountain Bike Series, including third in the Kabibo Banjak Alegria event in Philippines, and top 10 in the Guiyang event in China.

== Major results ==
=== Mountain bike ===
2022
National Mountain Bike Championships

1st Junior Cross Country Olympic

2023
National Mountain Bike Championships

2nd Elite Cross Country Eliminator
2nd U23 Cross Country Olympic

2024
National Mountain Bike Championships

1st Elite Cross Country Olympic
1st Elite Cross Country Short-Circuit
3rd Elite Cross Country Eliminator

Asian Mountain Bike Championships

3rd U23 Cross Country Olympic

2025
National Mountain Bike Championships

1st Elite Cross Country Olympic
1st Elite Cross Country Short-Circuit
1st Elite Cross Country Eliminator

2026
National Mountain Bike Championships

1st Elite Cross Country Olympic
2nd Elite Cross Country Eliminator

Asian Mountain Bike Series - Kabibo Banjak Alegria

3rd Elite Cross Country Olympic

=== Road ===
2020
National Road Championships

2nd Junior Road Race
8th Junior Road Race

2021
National Road Championships

5th Junior Road Race

2023
Asian Cycling Championships

1st U23 Road Race
6th Elite Road Race

National Road Championships

4th Road Race

2024
National Road Championships

1st Time Trial
3rd Road Race

2025
National Road Championships

3rd Time Trial
