= 2019 Mont Ventoux Dénivelé Challenge =

2019 UCI Europe Tour
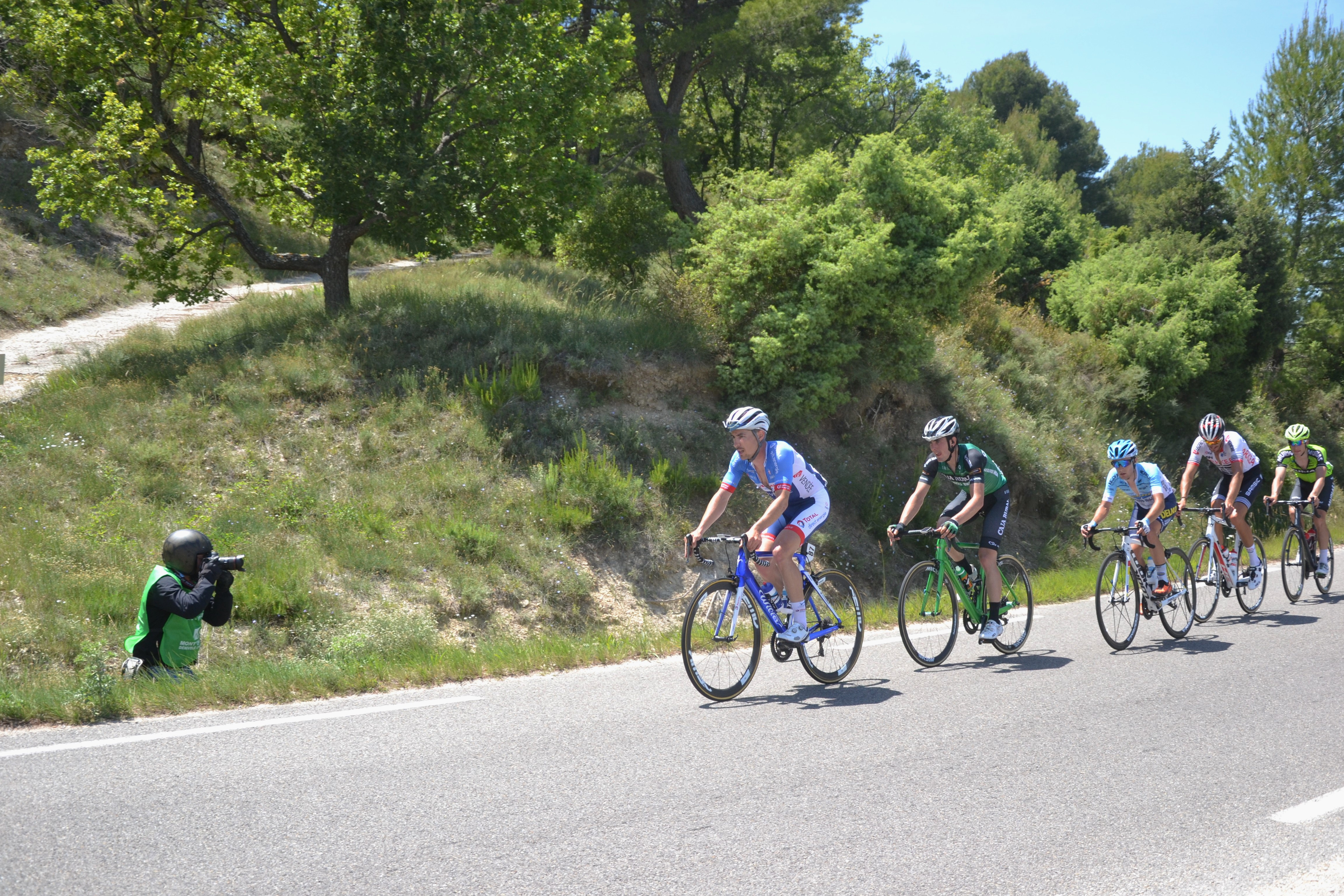

Race details
- Dates: 17 June 2019
- Stages: 1
- Distance: 173 km (107 mi)
- Winning time: 5h 02' 05"

Results
	Winner	Jesús Herrada (ESP)	(Cofidis)
	Second	Romain Bardet (FRA)	(AG2R La Mondiale)
	Third	Rein Taaramäe (EST)	(Total Direct Énergie)

The 2019 Mont Ventoux Dénivelé Challenge was the first edition of the Mont Ventoux Dénivelé Challenge road cycling one day race. It was held on 17 June 2019 as part of the 2019 UCI Europe Tour in category 1.1.

The race, which started in Vaison-la-Romaine and finished at the summit of Mont Ventoux, was won by Jesús Herrada of Cofidis.

== Teams ==
Twelve teams participated in the race, of which three were UCI WorldTour teams, seven were UCI Professional Continental teams, and two were UCI Continental Teams. Each team could enter up to seven riders; however, Groupama–FDJ and Total Direct Énergie entered only six, and EF Education First entered only five, meaning the race began with a peloton of 80 riders. Of these riders, 54 finished, 12 finished but were over the time limit, and 14 did not finish.

UCI WorldTeams

- AG2R La Mondiale
- EF Education First
- Groupama–FDJ

UCI Professional Continental Teams

- Arkéa–Samsic
- Caja Rural–Seguros RGA
- Cofidis
- Delko–Marseille Provence
- Euskadi–Murias
- Total Direct Énergie
- Vital Concept–B&B Hotels

UCI Continental Teams

- Amore & Vita–Prodir
- Interpro Cycling Academy

== Results ==
Result
Rank	Rider	Team	Time
1	Jesús Herrada (ESP)	Cofidis	5h 02' 05"
2	Romain Bardet (FRA)	AG2R La Mondiale	+ 9"
3	Rein Taaramäe (EST)	Total Direct Énergie	+ 1' 12"
4	Julien El Fares (FRA)	Delko–Marseille Provence	+ 1' 38"
5	Élie Gesbert (FRA)	Arkéa–Samsic	+ 2' 24"
6	Javier Moreno (ESP)	Delko–Marseille Provence	+ 2' 29"
7	Pierpaolo Ficara (ITA)	Amore & Vita–Prodir	+ 2' 40"
8	Óscar Rodríguez (ESP)	Euskadi–Murias	+ 2' 43"
9	Tony Gallopin (FRA)	AG2R La Mondiale	+ 2' 52"
10	Darwin Atapuma (COL)	Cofidis	+ 2' 58"
