= 2017 Tour of the Alps =

2017 UCI Europe Tour

Race details
- Dates: 17–21 April 2017
- Stages: 5
- Distance: 787.7 km (489.5 mi)
- Winning time: 20h 49' 37"

Results
Jersey awarded to the overall winner	Winner	Geraint Thomas (GBR)	(Team Sky)
	Second	Thibaut Pinot (FRA)	(FDJ)
	Third	Domenico Pozzovivo (ITA)	(AG2R La Mondiale)
Jersey awarded to the mountains classification winner	Mountains	Alexander Foliforov (RUS)	(Gazprom–RusVelo)
Jersey awarded to the youth classification winner	Youth	Egan Bernal (COL)	(Androni–Sidermec–Bottecchia)
Jersey awarded to the sprints classification winner	Sprints	Pascal Ackermann (GER)	(Bora–Hansgrohe)
	Team	BMC Racing Team	

The 2017 Tour of the Alps was a road cycling stage race that took place in Austria and Italy between 17 and 21 April 2017. It was the 41st edition of the renamed Giro del Trentino and was rated as a 2.HC event as part of the 2017 UCI Europe Tour.

Team Sky and one of its riders won the overall classification for the third year in succession, as Geraint Thomas became the first British rider to win the race. Thomas won the third stage of the race, taking the leader's fuchsia jersey as a result, and ultimately won by seven seconds ahead of Thibaut Pinot (FDJ), who finished all five stages within the top-five, including a stage win on the final day. The podium was completed by AG2R La Mondiale's Domenico Pozzovivo, a further thirteen seconds in arrears of Pinot.

In the race's other classifications, Androni–Sidermec–Bottecchia rider Egan Bernal took the young rider classification on the final day from Cannondale–Drapac's Hugh Carthy; Alexander Foliforov (Gazprom–RusVelo) and Pascal Ackermann (Bora–Hansgrohe) led from start-to-finish as they won the mountains and sprints classifications respectively, while the teams classification was won by the BMC Racing Team.

This was the last race of Michele Scarponi, who died the following day while training near home.

== Route ==
In October 2016, it was announced that the race would expand from four to five days. The route for the race was announced on 17 February 2017.

The second stage, initially scheduled to be run over 195.8 km (122 mi), and to start in Innsbruck, was shortened due to snow. The third stage was also shortened due to snow; from 143.1 km (89 mi), to 137.5 km (85 mi) but remaining at its scheduled start and finish locations.

Stage schedule
Stage	Date	Route	Distance	Type	Winner
1	17 April	Kufstein (Austria) to Innsbruck-Hungerburg (Austria)	145.1 km (90 mi)	Medium-mountain stage	Michele Scarponi (ITA)
2	18 April	Vipiteno (Italy) to Innervillgraten (Austria)	140.5 km (87 mi) (Note: Stage reduced from 195.8 km (122 mi) due to snow.)	Medium-mountain stage	Rohan Dennis (AUS)
3	19 April	Niederdorf (Italy) to Villnöß (Italy)	137.5 km (85 mi) (Note: Stage reduced from 143.1 km (89 mi) due to snow.)	Mountain stage	Geraint Thomas (GBR)
4	20 April	Bolzano (Italy) to Cles (Italy)	172.1 km (107 mi)	Medium-mountain stage	Matteo Montaguti (ITA)
5	21 April	Smarano (Italy) to Trento (Italy)	192.5 km (120 mi)	Mountain stage	Thibaut Pinot (FRA)

== Teams ==
On 17 February 2017, the race's eighteen competing teams were announced at the Biathlon World Championships 2017 in Hochfilzen, Austria. These included seven UCI WorldTeams, seven UCI Professional Continental teams, three UCI Continental teams and an Italian national team.

UCI WorldTeams

- AG2R La Mondiale
- Astana
- BMC Racing Team
- Bora–Hansgrohe
- Cannondale–Drapac
- FDJ
- Team Sky

UCI Professional Continental teams

- Aqua Blue Sport
- Bardiani–CSF
- Caja Rural–Seguros RGA
- Gazprom–RusVelo
- Nippo–Vini Fantini
- Wilier Triestina–Selle Italia
- Androni–Sidermec–Bottecchia

UCI Continental teams

- Bike Aid
- Sangemini–MG.K Vis
- Tirol Cycling Team

National teams

- Italy

== Stages ==
=== Stage 1 ===
17 April 2017 — Kufstein (Austria) to Innsbruck-Hungerburg (Austria), 145.1 km (90 mi)

Result of Stage 1
Rank	Rider	Team	Time
1	Michele Scarponi (ITA)	Astana	3h 32' 15"
2	Geraint Thomas (GBR)	Team Sky	+ 0"
3	Thibaut Pinot (FRA)	FDJ	+ 0"
4	Davide Formolo (ITA)	Cannondale–Drapac	+ 0"
5	Domenico Pozzovivo (ITA)	AG2R La Mondiale	+ 0"
6	Dario Cataldo (ITA)	Astana	+ 0"
7	Mattia Cattaneo (ITA)	Androni–Sidermec–Bottecchia	+ 4"
8	Hugh Carthy (GBR)	Cannondale–Drapac	+ 8"
9	Rohan Dennis (AUS)	BMC Racing Team	+ 11"
10	Damiano Caruso (ITA)	BMC Racing Team	+ 11"

General classification after Stage 1
Rank	Rider	Team	Time
1	Michele Scarponi (ITA)	Astana	3h 32' 05"
2	Geraint Thomas (GBR)	Team Sky	+ 4"
3	Thibaut Pinot (FRA)	FDJ	+ 6"
4	Davide Formolo (ITA)	Cannondale–Drapac	+ 10"
5	Domenico Pozzovivo (ITA)	AG2R La Mondiale	+ 10"
6	Dario Cataldo (ITA)	Astana	+ 10"
7	Mattia Cattaneo (ITA)	Androni–Sidermec–Bottecchia	+ 14"
8	Hugh Carthy (GBR)	Cannondale–Drapac	+ 18"
9	Rohan Dennis (AUS)	BMC Racing Team	+ 21"
10	Damiano Caruso (ITA)	BMC Racing Team	+ 21"

=== Stage 2 ===
18 April 2017 — Vipiteno (Italy) to Innervillgraten (Austria), 140.5 km (87 mi)

Result of Stage 2
Rank	Rider	Team	Time
1	Rohan Dennis (AUS)	BMC Racing Team	3h 20' 13"
2	Thibaut Pinot (FRA)	FDJ	+ 0"
3	Davide Ballerini (ITA)	Androni–Sidermec–Bottecchia	+ 0"
4	Nick Schultz (AUS)	Caja Rural–Seguros RGA	+ 0"
5	Geraint Thomas (GBR)	Team Sky	+ 0"
6	Eduard Prades (ESP)	Caja Rural–Seguros RGA	+ 0"
7	Luis León Sánchez (ESP)	Astana	+ 0"
8	Mattia Cattaneo (ITA)	Androni–Sidermec–Bottecchia	+ 0"
9	Kenny Elissonde (FRA)	Team Sky	+ 0"
10	Matteo Busato (ITA)	Wilier Triestina–Selle Italia	+ 0"

General classification after Stage 2
Rank	Rider	Team	Time
1	Thibaut Pinot (FRA)	FDJ	6h 52' 18"
2	Michele Scarponi (ITA)	Astana	+ 0"
3	Geraint Thomas (GBR)	Team Sky	+ 4"
4	Dario Cataldo (ITA)	Astana	+ 10"
5	Domenico Pozzovivo (ITA)	AG2R La Mondiale	+ 10"
6	Davide Formolo (ITA)	Cannondale–Drapac	+ 10"
7	Rohan Dennis (AUS)	BMC Racing Team	+ 11"
8	Mattia Cattaneo (ITA)	Androni–Sidermec–Bottecchia	+ 14"
9	Hugh Carthy (GBR)	Cannondale–Drapac	+ 18"
10	Damiano Caruso (ITA)	BMC Racing Team	+ 21"

=== Stage 3 ===
19 April 2017 — Niederdorf (Italy) to Villnöß (Italy), 137.5 km (85 mi)

Result of Stage 3
Rank	Rider	Team	Time
1	Geraint Thomas (GBR)	Team Sky	3h 47' 50"
2	Mikel Landa (ESP)	Team Sky	+ 0"
3	Domenico Pozzovivo (ITA)	AG2R La Mondiale	+ 4"
4	Pierre Rolland (FRA)	Cannondale–Drapac	+ 13"
5	Thibaut Pinot (FRA)	FDJ	+ 13"
6	Emanuel Buchmann (GER)	Bora–Hansgrohe	+ 15"
7	Danilo Celano (ITA)	Italy (national team)	+ 15"
8	Damiano Caruso (ITA)	BMC Racing Team	+ 15"
9	Davide Formolo (ITA)	Cannondale–Drapac	+ 15"
10	Hugh Carthy (GBR)	Cannondale–Drapac	+ 15"

General classification after Stage 3
Rank	Rider	Team	Time
1	Geraint Thomas (GBR)	Team Sky	10h 40' 02"
2	Domenico Pozzovivo (ITA)	AG2R La Mondiale	+ 16"
3	Thibaut Pinot (FRA)	FDJ	+ 19"
4	Michele Scarponi (ITA)	Astana	+ 21"
5	Davide Formolo (ITA)	Cannondale–Drapac	+ 31"
6	Mikel Landa (ESP)	Team Sky	+ 36"
7	Hugh Carthy (GBR)	Cannondale–Drapac	+ 39"
8	Damiano Caruso (ITA)	BMC Racing Team	+ 42"
9	Pierre Rolland (FRA)	Cannondale–Drapac	+ 46"
10	Danilo Celano (ITA)	Italy (national team)	+ 48"

=== Stage 4 ===
20 April 2017 — Bolzano (Italy) to Cles (Italy), 172.1 km (107 mi)

Result of Stage 4
Rank	Rider	Team	Time
1	Matteo Montaguti (ITA)	AG2R La Mondiale	4h 56' 38"
2	Thibaut Pinot (FRA)	FDJ	+ 0"
3	Rohan Dennis (AUS)	BMC Racing Team	+ 0"
4	Luis León Sánchez (ESP)	Astana	+ 0"
5	José Mendes (POR)	Bora–Hansgrohe	+ 0"
6	Damiano Caruso (ITA)	BMC Racing Team	+ 0"
7	Larry Warbasse (USA)	Aqua Blue Sport	+ 0"
8	Iuri Filosi (ITA)	Nippo–Vini Fantini	+ 0"
9	Matteo Busato (ITA)	Wilier Triestina–Selle Italia	+ 0"
10	Davide Villella (ITA)	Cannondale–Drapac	+ 0"

General classification after Stage 4
Rank	Rider	Team	Time
1	Geraint Thomas (GBR)	Team Sky	15h 36' 40"
2	Thibaut Pinot (FRA)	FDJ	+ 13"
3	Domenico Pozzovivo (ITA)	AG2R La Mondiale	+ 16"
4	Michele Scarponi (ITA)	Astana	+ 21"
5	Davide Formolo (ITA)	Cannondale–Drapac	+ 31"
6	Mikel Landa (ESP)	Team Sky	+ 36"
7	Hugh Carthy (GBR)	Cannondale–Drapac	+ 39"
8	Damiano Caruso (ITA)	BMC Racing Team	+ 42"
9	Pierre Rolland (FRA)	Cannondale–Drapac	+ 46"
10	Emanuel Buchmann (GER)	Bora–Hansgrohe	+ 48"

=== Stage 5 ===
21 April 2017 — Smarano (Italy) to Trento (Italy), 192.5 km (120 mi)

Result of Stage 5
Rank	Rider	Team	Time
1	Thibaut Pinot (FRA)	FDJ	5h 13' 01"
2	Brent Bookwalter (USA)	BMC Racing Team	+ 0"
3	Geraint Thomas (GBR)	Team Sky	+ 0"
4	Domenico Pozzovivo (ITA)	AG2R La Mondiale	+ 0"
5	Pierre Rolland (FRA)	Cannondale–Drapac	+ 2"
6	Michele Scarponi (ITA)	Astana	+ 2"
7	Egan Bernal (COL)	Androni–Sidermec–Bottecchia	+ 2"
8	Danilo Celano (ITA)	Italy (national team)	+ 2"
9	Mikel Landa (ESP)	Team Sky	+ 2"
10	Emanuel Buchmann (GER)	Bora–Hansgrohe	+ 2"

Final general classification
Rank	Rider	Team	Time
1	Geraint Thomas (GBR)	Team Sky	20h 49' 37"
2	Thibaut Pinot (FRA)	FDJ	+ 7"
3	Domenico Pozzovivo (ITA)	AG2R La Mondiale	+ 20"
4	Michele Scarponi (ITA)	Astana	+ 27"
5	Mikel Landa (ESP)	Team Sky	+ 42"
6	Pierre Rolland (FRA)	Cannondale–Drapac	+ 52"
7	Emanuel Buchmann (GER)	Bora–Hansgrohe	+ 54"
8	Danilo Celano (ITA)	Italy (national team)	+ 54"
9	Egan Bernal (COL)	Androni–Sidermec–Bottecchia	+ 1' 02"
10	Rodolfo Torres (COL)	Androni–Sidermec–Bottecchia	+ 1' 16"

== Classification leadership table ==
In the 2017 Tour of the Alps, four different jerseys were awarded. The general classification was calculated by adding each cyclist's finishing times on each stage. Time bonuses were awarded to the first three finishers on all stages: the stage winner won a ten-second bonus, with six and four seconds for the second and third riders respectively. The leader of the general classification received a fuchsia jersey; this classification was considered the most important of the 2017 Tour of the Alps, and the winner of the classification was considered the winner of the race.

The second classification was the sprints classification, the leader of which was awarded a red jersey. In the sprints classification, riders received points for finishing in the top three at intermediate sprint points during each stage. Points were awarded on a 6–4–2 scale for the first four stages, while the points were doubled for the final stage.

Points for the mountains classification
Position	1	2	3	4	5
Points for Category 1	10	8	6	4	2
Points for Category 2	6	4	2	0	
Points for Category 3	3	2	1	0	

There was also a mountains classification, for which points were awarded for reaching the top of a climb before other riders. Each of the ten climbs were categorised as either first, second, or third-category, with more points available for the more difficult, higher-categorised climbs. For first-category climbs, the top five riders earned points; on the other climbs, only the top three riders earned points. The leadership of the mountains classification was marked by a green jersey.

The fourth jersey represented the young rider classification, marked by a white jersey. Only riders born after 1 January 1994 were eligible; the young rider best placed in the general classification was the leader of the young rider classification. There was also a classification for teams, in which the times of the best three cyclists in a team on each stage were added together; the leading team at the end of the race was the team with the lowest cumulative time.

Stage	Winner	General classification	Mountains classification	Young rider classification	Sprints classification	Team classification
1	Michele Scarponi	Michele Scarponi	Alexander Foliforov	Hugh Carthy	Pascal Ackermann	Astana
2	Rohan Dennis	Thibaut Pinot	Alexander Foliforov	Hugh Carthy	Pascal Ackermann	Astana
3	Geraint Thomas	Geraint Thomas	Alexander Foliforov	Hugh Carthy	Pascal Ackermann	Cannondale–Drapac
4	Matteo Montaguti	Geraint Thomas	Alexander Foliforov	Hugh Carthy	Pascal Ackermann	Cannondale–Drapac
5	Thibaut Pinot	Geraint Thomas	Alexander Foliforov	Egan Bernal	Pascal Ackermann	BMC Racing Team
Final		Geraint Thomas	Alexander Foliforov	Egan Bernal	Pascal Ackermann	BMC Racing Team
