= Tour de Iskandar Johor =

Race details
- Date: April
- Region: Malaysia
- Discipline: Road
- Competition: UCI Asia Tour
- Type: Stage race
- Organiser: Johor Cycling Association

History
- First edition: 2019
- Editions: 1 (as of 2019)
- First winner: Mario Vogt (GER)
- Most recent: Mario Vogt (GER)

The Tour de Iskandar Johor was a professional road bicycle racing stage race held in the Malaysian state of Johor. The race was part of the UCI Asia Tour and was classified by the International Cycling Union (UCI) as a 2.2 category race.

To date, 2019 is the only edition the race were held. The race in 2019 originally were to have a 5 stage race across the state of Johor, before being shortened to only 3 stages due to budget constraint.

== Past winners ==
Year	Country	Rider	Team
2019	Germany	Mario Vogt	Team Sapura Cycling
