= André Looij =

Dutch cyclist

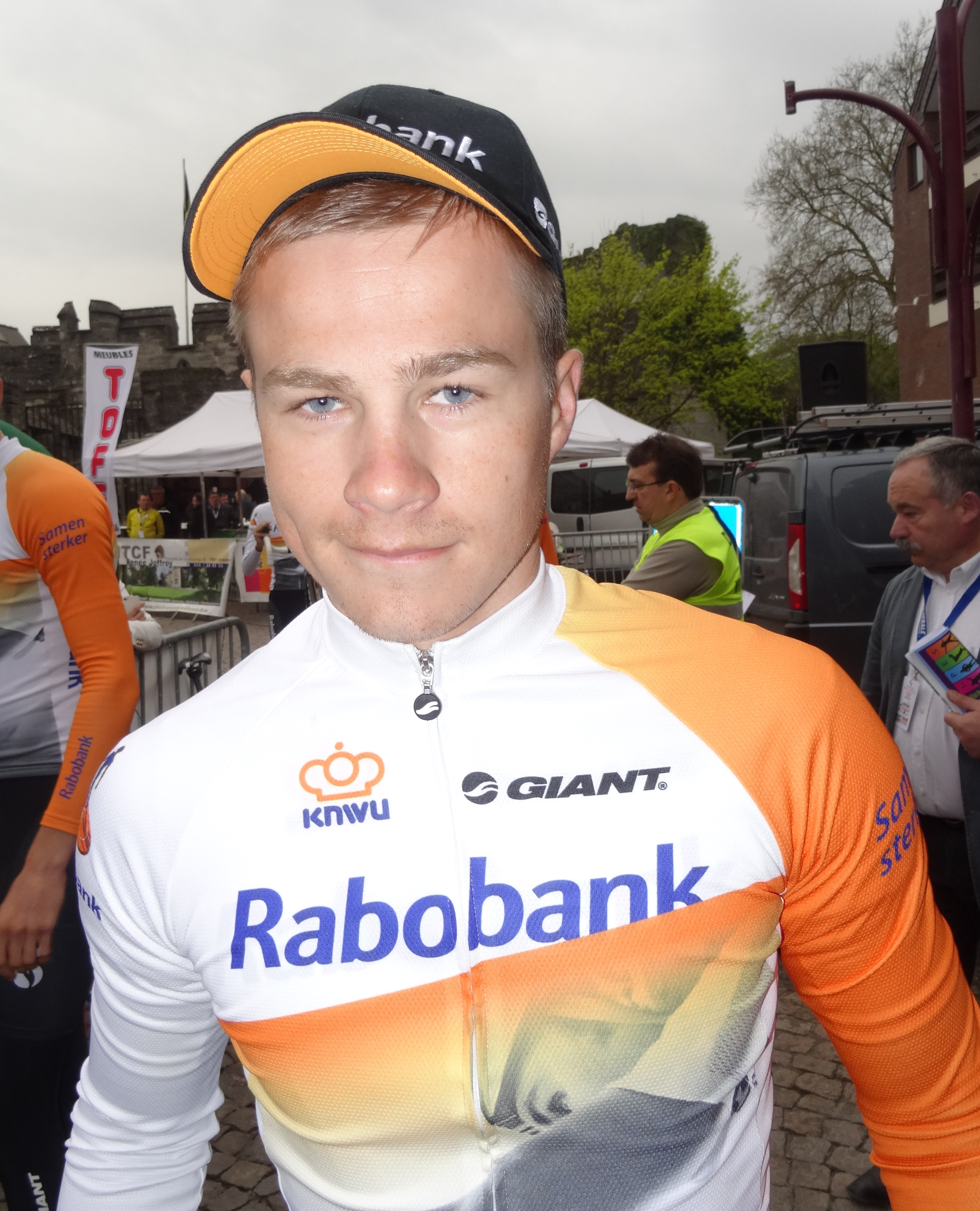
- Looij in 2014

Personal information
- Full name: André Looij
- Born: 25 May 1995 (age 31) Wilnis, Netherlands
- Height: 1.77 m (5 ft 10 in)
- Weight: 75 kg (165 lb)

Cycling career
- Sport: Cycling
- Current team: Retired
- Discipline: Road
- Role: Rider
- Rider type: Sprinter

Amateur team
- 2014: Rabobank Development Team

Professional teams
- 2015–2017: Team Roompot
- 2018: Monkey Town Continental Team
- 2019–2020: Taiyuan Miogee Cycling Team

André Looij (born 25 May 1995) is a Dutch former professional racing cyclist, who rode professionally between 2015 and 2020 for Roompot–Nederlandse Loterij, the Monkey Town Continental Team and the SSOIS Miogee Cycling Team.

== Major results ==
2014
1st Stage 1 Le Triptyque des Monts et Châteaux
1st Stage 6 Tour de Bretagne
1st Stage 2 Kreiz Breizh Elites
3rd Ronde van Midden-Nederland
5th Grand Prix de la Somme
6th De Kustpijl
7th Ster van Zwolle
7th Baronie Breda Classic
8th Münsterland Giro
2015
4th Handzame Classic
4th Münsterland Giro
9th Grand Prix d'Isbergues
2016
5th Handzame Classic
7th Ronde van Limburg
10th Omloop Mandel-Leie-Schelde
2017
6th Handzame Classic
7th Omloop Eurometropool
8th Nokere Koerse
9th Münsterland Giro
2018
1st Himmerland Rundt
1st Grote Prijs Jean-Pierre Monseré
4th Ronde van Noord-Holland
8th Fyen Rundt
9th Arno Wallaard Memorial
