= Grace Phang =

Malaysian cyclist

Personal information
- Full name: Grace Phang Ching Zen
- Born: 13 September 1985 (age 41) Kuala Lumpur, Malaysia

Cycling career
- Sport: Cycling
- Role: Rider

Amateur teams
- 2018: Al'Asayl Cycling Team
- 2019: KOM Financial Advice Racing Team

Major wins
- One-day races and Classics National Time Trial Championships (2013, 2016)

Grace Phang (born 13 September 1985) is a Malaysian former racing cyclist. Born in Kuala Lumpur, she currently resides in Australia where she works with ANZ.

She rides for the Al'Asayl Cycling Team in 2018. In 2016, she was the Malaysian national individual time trial champion.

== Major results ==
=== Road ===
2013
National Road Championships

1st Time Trial

2016
National Road Championships

1st Time Trial

== See also ==
- List of 2018 UCI Women's Teams and riders
