= Hideto Nakane =

Japanese cyclist

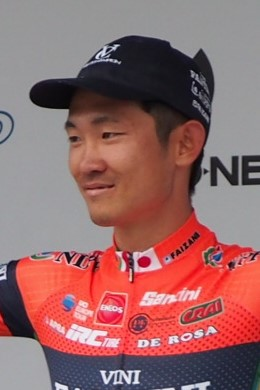
- Nakane in 2019

Personal information
- Born: 2 May 1990 (age 36) Nagoya, Japan
- Height: 1.69 m (5 ft 7 in)
- Weight: 55 kg (121 lb; 8.7 st)

Cycling career
- Sport: Cycling
- Current team: Retired
- Discipline: Road
- Role: Rider

Amateur team
- 2010–2011: Eurasia–Museeuw Bikes

Professional teams
- 2011: D'Angelo & Antenucci–Nippo (stagiaire)
- 2012–2013: Team Nippo
- 2014–2016: Aisan Racing Team
- 2017–2019: Nippo–Vini Fantini
- 2020: Nippo–Delko–One Provence
- 2021–2022: EF Education–Nippo

Hideto Nakane (born 2 May 1990 in Nagoya) is a Japanese professional road racing cyclist, who competed as a professional from 2012 to 2022.

== Major results ==
2013
6th Overall Tour de Hokkaido
2014
4th Overall Tour de Kumano
4th Overall Tour de Ijen
9th Overall Tour de East Java
2015
4th Overall Tour de Kumano

1st Mountains classification

2016
4th Overall Tour de Hokkaido
2017
8th Overall Tour d'Azerbaïdjan
9th Overall Tour de Hokkaido
2018
5th Road race, Asian Games
8th Overall Tour de Taiwan
9th Overall Tour of Japan
2019
6th Japan Cup
2020
6th Overall Tour de Langkawi

1st Stage 6

7th Overall Tour de Taiwan
2021
National Road Championships

3rd Time trial
3rd Road race
