= Bernard Van Aert =

Indonesian cyclist

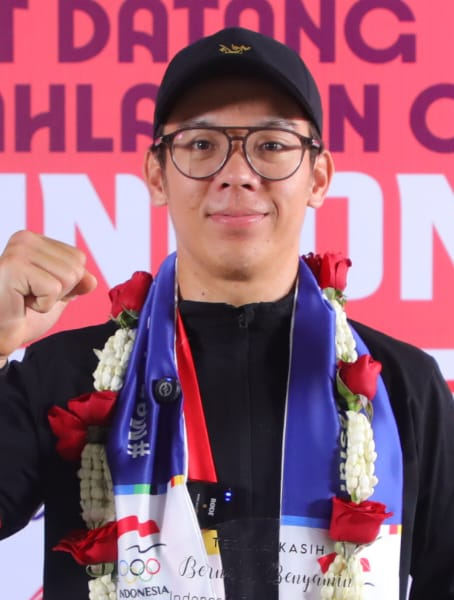
- Bernard Van Aert at the 2024 Summer Olympics

Personal information
- Full name: Bernard Benyamin Van Aert
- Born: 8 September 1997 (age 29) Singkawang, West Kalimantan, Indonesia

Cycling career
- Sport: Cycling
- Current team: Mula Cycling Team
- Disciplines: Road; Track
- Role: Rider

Professional teams
- 2017: Nice Cycling Team
- 2018: Java Partizan
- 2019: Brunei Continental Cycling Team
- 2020–: Mula Cycling Team
Medal record
Men's track cycling
Representing Indonesia
UCI Nations Cup
Silver medal – second place	2022 Cali	Omnium
Asian Championships
Silver medal – second place	2020 Jincheon	Points race
Silver medal – second place	2024 New Delhi	Omnium
Silver medal – second place	2024 New Delhi	Madison
Silver medal – second place	2025 Nilai	Omnium
Bronze medal – third place	2020 Jincheon	Scratch
Bronze medal – third place	2023 Nilai	Madison
Bronze medal – third place	2025 Nilai	Elimination
Bronze medal – third place	2025 Nilai	Madison
Asia Cup
Silver medal – second place	2022 Suphan Buri	Omnium
SEA Games
Bronze medal – third place	2025 Thailand	Points race

Bernard Benyamin Van Aert (born 8 September 1997) is an Indonesian road and track cyclist. He won the silver medal in the omnium at the 2022 UCI Track Cycling Nations Cup. Van Aert competed in omnium event at the 2024 Summer Olympics, placing 20th overall.

== Major results ==
2019
5th Road race, National Road Championships
2020
Asian Track Championships

2nd Points race
3rd Scratch

2022
2nd Omnium, UCI Track Nations Cup, Cali
5th Road race, Southeast Asian Games
2023
7th Tour of Thailand
2024
4th Tour of Siak
