= Taj Jones =

Australian cyclist (born 2000)

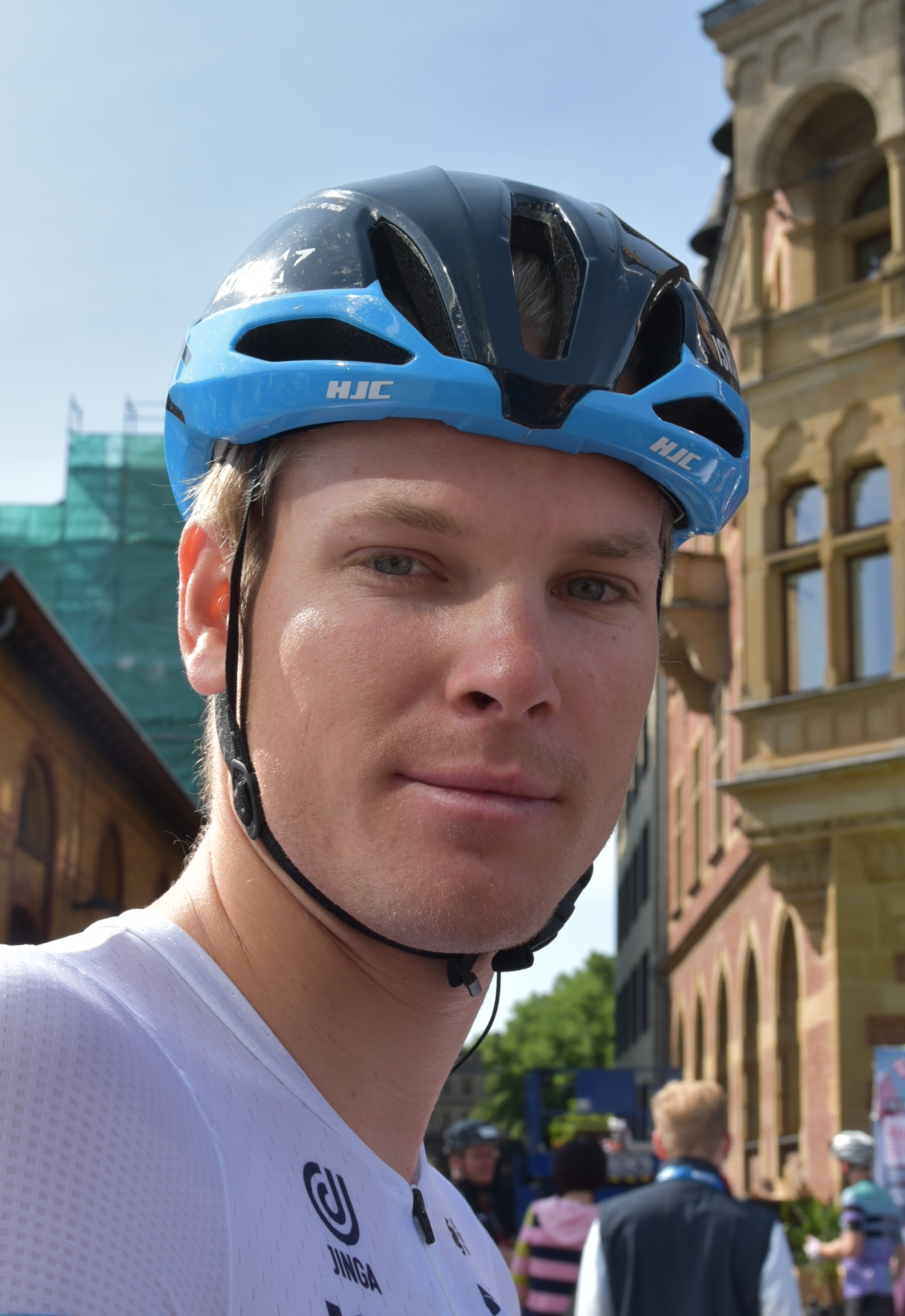
- Taj Jones (2022)

Personal information
- Full name: Taj Jones
- Born: 26 July 2000 (age 26) Nanango, Australia
- Height: 1.92 m (6 ft 4 in)
- Weight: 83 kg (183 lb)

Cycling career
- Sport: Cycling
- Discipline: Road
- Role: Rider
- Rider type: Sprinter

Amateur team
- 2018: Nero–KOM Financial Advice Racing

Professional teams
- 2019–2020: Pro Racing Sunshine Coast
- 2021: Israel Cycling Academy
- 2021–2023: Israel Start-Up Nation

Taj Jones (born 26 July 2000) is an Australian cyclist, who most recently rode for UCI ProTeam Israel–Premier Tech.

For the 2021 season, Jones joined Israel Cycling Academy for the first part of the season, and on 1 July joined the Israel Start-Up Nation team thereafter – signing a contract until the end of the 2023 season.

== Major results ==
2019
1st Stage 5 Tour of America's Dairyland
2020
1st Stage 2 Tour de Langkawi
2021
9th Gran Premio della Liberazione
