= Danilo Celano =

Italian cyclist

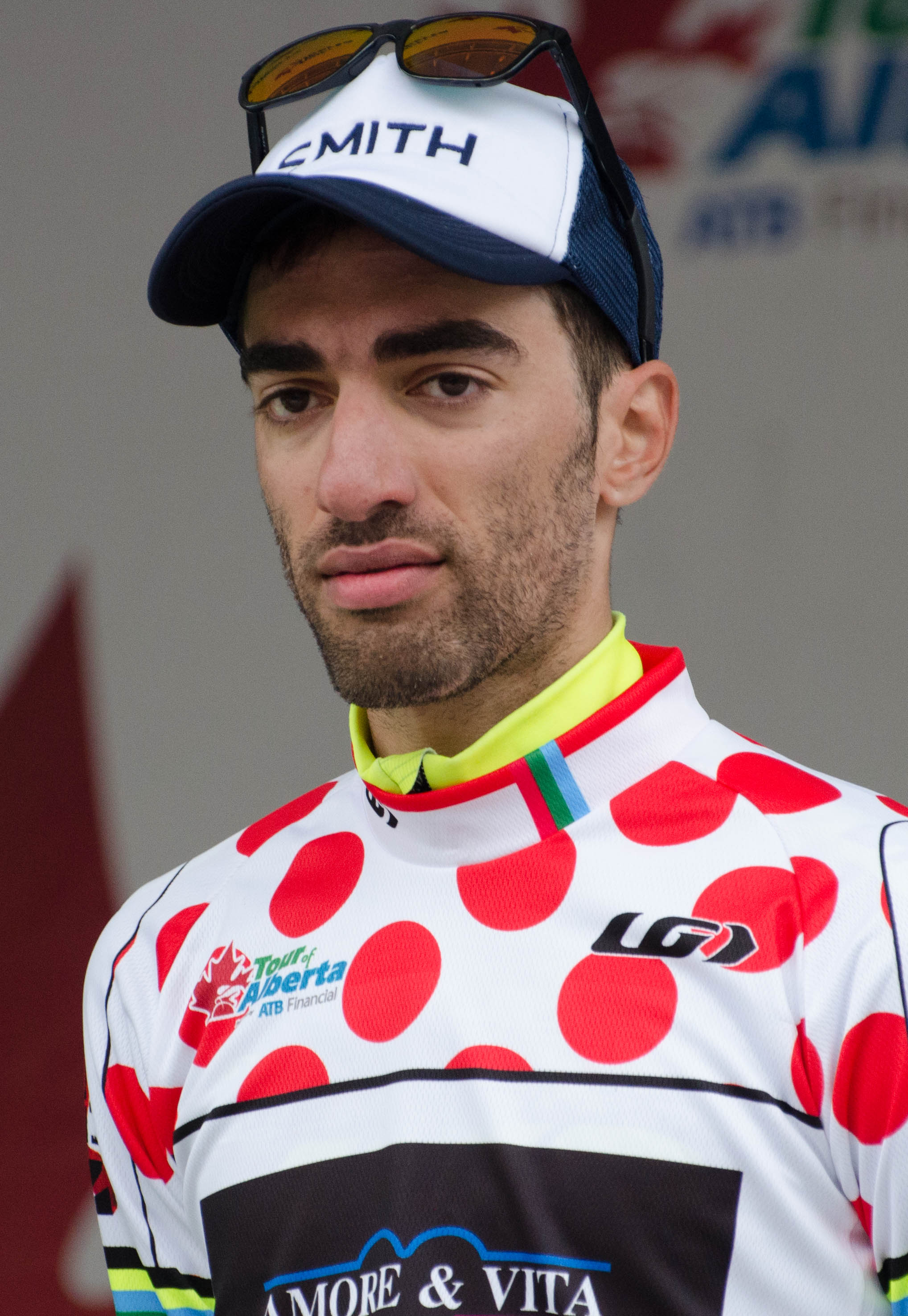
- Celano at the 2016 Tour of Alberta

Personal information
- Full name: Danilo Celano
- Born: 7 December 1989 (age 36) Vasto, Italy

Cycling career
- Sport: Cycling
- Discipline: Road
- Role: Rider
- Rider type: Climber

Amateur teams
- 2009: Massi
- 2010–2011: SCAP Prefabbricati Foresi
- 2012–2014: Calzaturieri Montegranaro Marini Silvano
- 2015: Futura Matricardi

Professional teams
- 2016–2017: Amore & Vita–Selle SMP
- 2017–2018: Caja Rural–Seguros RGA
- 2019: Amore & Vita–Prodir
- 2020–2023: Team Sapura Cycling

Major wins
- One-day races and Classics Giro dell'Appennino (2017)

Danilo Celano (born 7 December 1989) is an Italian former cyclist, who last rode for UCI Continental team Team Sapura Cycling. He was the winner of the 2017 Giro dell'Appennino, and is regarded as a very talented climber.

== Career ==
Celano competed in UCI races as an amateur cyclist from 2010 until 2015.

=== Amore & Vita-Selle SMP (2016–2017) ===
Celano turned professional in 2016, riding for the Ukrainian team Amore & Vita–Selle SMP. At the Tour of Alberta, Celano won the mountains classification after being in several breakaways which led him to take points for the jersey.

At the 2017 Settimana Internazionale di Coppi e Bartali, Celano won the mountains classification, which he secured on the last day of the race. He then went on to win his first professional race on 9 April by winning the prestigious Italian one-day race Giro dell'Appennino. He continued his good run of form at the Tour of the Alps, where he finished 7th on a stage and ended up taking 8th overall.

=== Caja Rural-Seguros RGA (2017–2018) ===
On 1 August 2017, Celano moved to the Spanish Professional Continental outfit Caja Rural–Seguros RGA. His first race for the team was the Vuelta a Burgos, where he crashed and abandoned the race. He struggled to find form in the Italian one-day races in September and October, but proved his worth at the Tour of Turkey. He was the leader of the mountains classification but lost the jersey on the penultimate day to fellow countryman Mirco Maestri.

Celano's best result in the 2018 season was 37th at the GP Miguel Induráin. At the Tour of Croatia, he was 18th in the general classification when going in to the final stage but he ended up abandoning the race.

== Major results ==
2016
1st Mountains classification Tour of Alberta
2nd Tour de Berne
2017
1st Giro dell'Appennino
1st Mountains classification Settimana Internazionale di Coppi e Bartali
8th Overall Tour of the Alps
2019
3rd Overall Tour of Almaty

1st Stage 2

2020
1st Overall Tour de Langkawi
9th Overall New Zealand Cycle Classic
