= Marcus Culey =

Australian cyclist (born 1993)

Personal information
- Full name: Marcus Culey
- Born: 15 November 1993 (age 32) Sydney, Australia
- Height: 1.82 m (6 ft 0 in)
- Weight: 69 kg (152 lb)

Cycling career
- Sport: Cycling
- Current team: Retired
- Discipline: Road
- Role: Rider

Professional teams
- 2017–2018: St George Continental Cycling Team
- 2019–2020: Team Sapura Cycling
- 2021: Team UKYO

Marcus Culey (born 15 November 1993 in Sydney) is a retired Australian cyclist, who previously rode for UCI Continental team Team UKYO.

== Major results ==
2017
1st Overall Tour de Molvccas

1st Stage 1

4th Overall Tour of Quanzhou Bay
7th Time trial, Oceania Cycling Championships
2018
2nd Overall Tour de Siak
4th Overall Tour de Ijen

1st Stage 1

4th Overall Tour of Quanzhou Bay
6th Overall Tour de Kumano
2019
1st Overall Tour de Selangor

1st Points classification
1st Mountains classification
1st Stages 1, 2, 3 & 4

1st Stage 1 Tour de Langkawi
1st Stage 3 Tour of Indonesia
4th Overall Tour of Taiyuan
7th Overall Tour of Quanzhou Bay
2020
National Road Championships

3rd Road Race
7th Time trial

3rd Overall Tour de Taiwan

1st Mountains classification
