= Mula Cycling Team =

Indonesian cycling team

Team information
- UCI code: MLA
- Registered: Indonesia
- Founded: 2017
- Discipline: Road
- Status: Amateur (2017); UCI Continental (2018–)

Key personnel
- General manager: Izza Ubaidillah
- Team managers: Satria Purwanto; Wawan Setyobudi; Arin Iswana

Team name history
- 2017–2020 2020–: PGN Road Cycling Team (PGN); Mula Cycling Team (MLA)

Mula Cycling Team is an Indonesian UCI Continental cycling team established in 2017.

== Team roster ==
As of 21 February 2021.

Rider	Date of birth
Aiman Cahyadi (INA)	16 November 1993 (age 32)
Ahmad Firdaus (INA)	30 May 2000 (age 26)
Sandy Hasan (INA)	31 May 1998 (age 28)
Jamal Hibatullah (INA)	28 January 1997 (age 29)
Yuda Muhammad (INA)	7 June 1997 (age 29)

Rider	Date of birth
Shafrifat Nandamulya (INA)	28 October 2000 (age 25)
Jamalidin Novardianto (INA)	17 November 1994 (age 31)
Bambang Suryadi (INA)	8 April 1990 (age 36)
Bernard van Aert (INA)	8 September 1997 (age 28)
Rachmad Wibisono (INA)	27 November 1999 (age 26)

== Major results ==
2018
Stage 2 Tour de Ijen, Jamalidin Nouardianto
Stage 1 Tour de Singkarak, Jamalidin Nouardianto
2019
Stage 4 Ronda Pilipinas, Jamalidin Novardianto
Stage 2 Tour de Ijen, Aiman Cahyadi
