= Tour of Taiyuan =

Race details
- Date: October
- Region: Taiyuan, China
- Local name(s): 环太原国际公路自行车赛 (in Chinese)
- Discipline: Road
- Competition: UCI Asia Tour
- Type: Stage race

History
- First edition: 2019
- Editions: 2 (as of 2020)
- First winner: Cameron Piper (USA)
- Most recent: Peng Xin (CHN)

Tour of Taiyuan is a men's multi-day cycling race which takes place in China. It is rated as a 2.2 event on the UCI Asia Tour.

== Past winners ==
Year	Winner	Second	Third
2019	(United States) Cameron Piper	(Italy) Luca Raggio	(Netherlands) Jeroen Meijers
2020	(China) Peng Xin		
