= Tour de Moluccas =

Race details
- Nickname(s): TdM
- Discipline: Road
- Competition: UCI Asia Tour 2.2
- Type: Stage race

History
- First edition: 2017
- Editions: 1 (as of 2017)
- First winner: Marcus Culey (AUS)
- Most recent: Marcus Culey (AUS)

Tour de Moluccas (abbreviated TdM) is a professional road bicycle racing stage race held in Maluku, Indonesia. The race is part of the UCI Asia Tour and was classified by the International Cycling Union (UCI) as a 2.2 category race. The participants pass through four areas of the Maluku province namely West Seram Regency, Central Maluku Regency, East Seram Regency and Ambon.

== Past winners ==
Year	Country	Rider	Team
2017	Australia	Marcus Culey	St George Continental Cycling Team

== 2017 Tour de Molvccas ==
The first international cycling competition Tour de Molvccas (TdM) 2017 was held September 18 and end on September 23. Cyclists from 20 countries participated the race of five stages with a total distance of 713.7 kilometers. Four stages of the race were located on Seram Island while the other one is located on Ambon.
