= Taiyuan Miogee Cycling Team =

Chinese cycling team

Team information
- UCI code: TMC
- Registered: China
- Founded: 2019
- Discipline: Road
- Status: UCI Continental (2019–)

Key personnel
- General manager: Wu Zhiling
- Team managers: Yang Peng; Chaiya Moondet; Wu Qiang

Team name history
- 2019 2020 2021–: Taiyuan Miogee Cycling Team (TMC); SSOIS Miogee Cycling Team (SMC); Taiyuan Miogee Cycling Team (TMC)

Taiyuan Miogee Cycling Team (UCI team code: TMC) is a UCI Continental team, based in Shanxi, China, that was founded in 2019.

== Team roster ==
As of 25 February 2021.

Rider	Date of birth
Dong Yonglong (CHN)	10 February 2000 (age 26)
Gong Wenkai (CHN)	14 January 1998 (age 28)
Jiao Yuning (CHN)	7 September 2000 (age 25)
Li Daihou (CHN)	6 March 1996 (age 30)
Li Dongliang (CHN)	8 January 2000 (age 26)

Rider	Date of birth
Li Honghai (CHN)	6 May 2000 (age 26)
Qiao Jiakun (CHN)	18 March 2000 (age 26)
Yan Shuaijie (CHN)	30 January 1997 (age 29)
Yang Wei (CHN)	12 August 1997 (age 29)
Zhang Guangyu (CHN)	18 June 1993 (age 33)

== Major wins ==
2019
Overall Tour de Filipinas, Jeroen Meijers

Stage 1, Jeroen Meijers

Stage 2 Tour of Indonesia, Jeroen Meijers
Stage 1 Tour of Xingtai, Amir Kolahdozhagh
Overall Tour of China I, Jeroen Meijers

Stage 4, Jeroen Meijers
