= Team Sapura Cycling =

Malaysian cycling team

Malaysia Pro Cycling
Team information
- UCI code: MPC
- Registered: Malaysia
- Founded: 2017
- Discipline: Road
- Status: UCI Continental
- Bicycles: Trek
- Components: Shimano

Key personnel
- General manager: Sayuti Zahit
- Team manager: Mohd Azlan Jamalludin

Team name history
- 2017–2023 2023-: Team Sapura Cycling; Malaysia Pro Cycling

Malaysia Pro Cycling is a Malaysian UCI Continental cycling team. It was founded in 2017 as Team Sapura Cycling with major backing from Sapura Holdings Berhad, a renowned conglomerate from Malaysia.

The team were forced to close down in June 2023 after their main sponsor, Sapura pulled out from the team on February that year, but the management of the team quickly reformed the team under the new name, Malaysia Pro Cycling and new sponsors, and the new team were announced just 2 months later, in August 2023.

== Team roster ==
As of 9 August 2025.

Rider	Date of birth
Mohamad Saari Amri Abd Rasim (MAS)	4 August 1998 (age 28)
Mohamad Izzat Hilmi Abdul Halil (MAS)	18 September 1995 (age 31)
Ahmad Syazrin Awang Ilah (MAS)	15 October 1997 (age 28)
Muhamad Zawawi Azman (MAS)	3 August 1994 (age 32)
Mior Muhammad Hazwan Hamzah (MAS)	10 February 2001 (age 25)
Muhammad Fahmi Khairul (MAS)	5 April 2001 (age 25)

Rider	Date of birth
Muhammad Syawal Mazlin (MAS)	15 November 2004 (age 21)
Ariff Danial Noor Roseidi (MAS)	24 September 2000 (age 26)
Mohammad Faiz Fakhri Omar (MAS)	14 June 2002 (age 24)
Muhammad Zahin Wahhi (MAS)	23 November 1998 (age 27)
Akmal Hakim Zakaria (MAS)	25 September 1996 (age 30)
Zulfikri Zulkifli (MAS)	10 November 2000 (age 25)

== Major wins ==
2017
Stage 3 Tour de Lombok, Jahir Perez
Stage 2 Tour de Molvccas, Akmal Hakim Zakaria
Stage 4 Jelajah Malaysia, Jahir Perez

2018
Stage 1 Tour of Indonesia, Dylan Page
Prologue Tour of Cartier, Mario Vogt
Stage 2 Tour de Lombok, Muhamad Zawawi Azman
Stage 3 Tour de Siak, Mohamad Izzat Hilmi Abdul Halil
Stage 4 Tour de Siak, Akmal Hakim Zakaria
Stage 3 Tour de Ijen, Jesse Ewart
Overall Tour de Singkarak, Jesse Ewart

Stage 3, Jesse Ewart

2019
Oceania Continental Championships, Road Race, Benjamin Dyball
Oceania Continental Championships, Time Trial, Benjamin Dyball
Stage 1 Tour de Tochigi, Benjamin Dyball
Overall Tour de Langkawi, Benjamin Dyball

Stage 1, Marcus Culey
Stage 4, Benjamin Dyball

Overall Tour de Iskandar Johor, Mario Vogt

Stage 2, Cristian Raileanu

Stage 4 Tour of Taiyuan, Cristian Raileanu
Stages 2 & 5 Tour de Filipinas, Mario Vogt
Malaysia National Time Trial Championships, Muhsin Al Redha Misbah
Moldova National Time Trial Championships, Cristian Raileanu
Moldova National Road Race Championships, Cristian Raileanu
Stage 7 (ITT) Tour of Qinghai Lake, Ben Dyball
Stage 3 Tour of Indonesia, Marcus Culey
Stage 5 Tour of Indonesia, Ben Dyball
Stage 5 Tour of Peninsular, Cristian Raileanu
Overall Tour de Singkarak, Jesse Ewart

Stages 1 & 2, Jesse Ewart
Stage 4, Cristian Raileanu
Stage 9, Muhamad Zawawi Azman

Overall Tour de Selangor, Marcus Culey

Stages 1, 2, 3 & 4, Marcus Culey

2020
Overall Tour de Langkawi, Danilo Celano
Romania National Road Race Championships, Serghei Țvetcov
Moldova National Time Trial Championships, Cristian Raileanu
Moldova National Road Race Championships, Cristian Raileanu
Malaysia National Time Trial Championships, Nur Aiman Rosli
Malaysia National Road Race Championships, Akmal Hakim Zakaria

2021
Turkey National Time Trial Championships, Ahmet Örken
Malaysia National Time Trial Championships, Nur Aiman Rosli

== Continental & national champions ==
2019
Oceanian Time Trial, Ben Dyball
Oceanian Road Race, Ben Dyball
Malaysian Time Trial, Muhsin Al Redha Misbah
Moldavian Time Trial, Cristian Raileanu
Moldavian Road Race, Cristian Raileanu
2020
Romanian Time Trial, Serghei Țvetcov
Moldavian Time Trial, Cristian Raileanu
Moldavian Road Race, Cristian Raileanu
Malaysian Time Trial, Nur Aiman Rosli
Malaysian Road Race, Akmal Hakim Zakaria
2021
Turkey Time Trial, Ahmet Örken
Moldavian Time Trial, Cristian Raileanu
Malaysian Time Trial, Nur Aiman Rosli
Malaysian Road Race, Mohamad Saari Amri Abd Rasim
2022
Malaysian Time Trial, Nur Aiman Rosli
Malaysian Road Race, Muhsin Al Redha Misbah
Malaysian U23 Road Race, Mior Muhammad Hazwan Hamzah
