= Tour de Selangor =

Race details
- Discipline: Road
- Competition: UCI Asia Tour 2.2
- Type: Stage race

History
- First edition: 2017
- Editions: 2 (as of 2019)
- First winner: Muhamad Zawawi Azman (MAS)
- Most recent: Marcus Culey (AUS)

The Tour de Selangor is an annual professional road bicycle racing stage race held in Malaysia since 2017. The race is part of the UCI Asia Tour and was classified by the International Cycling Union (UCI) as a 2.2 category race.

== Past winners ==
Year	Country	Rider	Team
2017	Malaysia	Muhamad Zawawi Azman	Team Sapura Cycling
2018	No race		
2019	Australia	Marcus Culey	Team Sapura Cycling
