= Malaysian National Cycling Federation =

National governing body of cycle racing in Malaysia

Malaysian National Cycling Federation

The Malaysian National Cycling Federation (MNCF) (Malay: Persekutuan Kebangsaan Berbasikal Malaysia (PKBM) is the national governing body of cycling in Malaysia. Founded in 1953, it is a member of the UCI since 1960 and the Asian Cycling Confederation.

The Committee has announced a total of 56 cycling racing tournaments scheduled to take place nationwide for the year 2026 including 11 tournaments offering UCI points involving the discipline of Road, Track, MTB and BMX events.
