= 2017 Hong Kong Challenge =

One-day cycling road race

2017 Sun Hung Kai Properties Hong Kong Challenge
2017 UCI Asia Tour

Race details
- Dates: October 8, 2017
- Distance: 103 km (64.00 mi)
- Winning time: 2h 35' 57"

Results
Jersey awarded to the overall winner	Winner	Matej Mohorič (SLO)	(UAE Team Emirates)
	Second	Robbie Hucker (AUS)	(IsoWhey Sports SwissWellness)
	Third	Yukiya Arashiro (JPN)	(Japan)

The 2017 Sun Hung Kai Properties Hong Kong Challenge was the inaugural edition of the Hong Kong Challenge one-day race. The race was held on October 8, and was rated as a 1.1 event on the UCI Asia Tour.

Matej Mohorič of Slovenia won the race, followed by Robbie Hucker of Australia second and Yukiya Arashiro of Japan third.

== Teams ==
Seventeen teams participated in the race. Each team had a maximum of six riders:

WorldTeams

- Orica–Scott
- UAE Team Emirates

Professional continental team

- Delko–Marseille Provence KTM

Continental teams

- Aisan Racing Team
- Bike Channel–Canyon
- H&R Block Pro Cycling
- Hainan Jilun Cycling Team
- HKSI Pro Cycling Team
- IsoWhey Sports SwissWellness
- Rietumu Banka–Riga
- RTS–Monton Racing Team
- Team Ukyo
- WIGGINS
- Terengganu Cycling Team
- Yunnan Lvshan Landscape–Taishan Pardus

National teams

- Japan
- Romania

== Results ==
=== General classification ===
	Rider	Team	Time
1	(Slovenia) Matej Mohorič	UAE Team Emirates	2h 35' 57"
2	(Australia) Robbie Hucker	IsoWhey Sports SwissWellness	+ 5"
3	(Japan) Yukiya Arashiro	Japan	+ 1' 14"
4	(Australia) Mitchell Docker	Orica–Scott	+ 1' 14"
5	(Australia) Sam Crome	IsoWhey Sports SwissWellness	+ 1' 43"
6	(United Kingdom) Harry Tanfield	Bike Channel–Canyon	+ 1' 53"
7	(Australia) Michael Hepburn	Orica–Scott	+ 2' 21"
8	(France) Quentin Pacher	Delko–Marseille Provence KTM	+ 2' 21"
9	(Canada) Travis Samuel	H&R Block Pro Cycling	+ 2' 23"
10	(Greece) Polychronis Tzortzakis	RTS–Monton Racing Team	+ 2' 39"

== List of teams and riders ==
A total of 18 teams, including two WorldTeams, one Professional Continental team, 13 Continental teams, and 2 national teams, were invited to participate in the 2017 SHKP Hong Kong Challenge. As Kuwaiti continental team Nice Cycling Team was unable to attend, there were 93 riders in remaining 17 teams took part in the race

(Australia) Orica–Scott

- (Slovenia) Luka Mezgec
- (Australia) Mathew Hayman
- (Australia) Luke Durbridge
- (Australia) Mitchell Docker
- (New Zealand) Sam Bewley
- (Australia) Michael Hepburn

(United Arab Emirates) UAE Team Emirates

- (Italy) Andrea Guardini
- (United Kingdom) Ben Swift
- (Slovenia) Matej Mohorič
- (Italy) Seid Lizde

(France) Delko–Marseille Provence KTM

- (Estonia) Martin Laas
- (Spain) Mikel Aristi
- (France) Benjamin Giraud
- (France) Quentin Pacher
- (France) Jonathan Couanon
- (Australia) Ben Dyball

(Japan) Aisan Racing Team

- (Japan) Hayato Okamoto
- (Japan) Kota Sumiyoshi
- (Japan) Shiki Kuroeda
- (Japan) Hiroaki Harada

(United Kingdom) Bike Channel–Canyon

- (United Kingdom) Harry Tanfield
- (United Kingdom) Max Stedman
- (United Kingdom) Chris Opie
- (United Kingdom) Mitchell Webber
- (United Kingdom) Rob Partridge
- (United Kingdom) Dexter Gardias

(Canada) H&R Block Pro Cycling

- (Canada) Travis Samuel
- (Australia) Ryan Macanally
- (Slovenia) Jure Rupnik
- (Canada) Alexis Cartier
- (Canada) Marc-Antonie Nadon
- (Canada) Chris Prendergast

(China) Hainan Jilun Cycling Team

- (China) Yang Tao
- (Colombia) Antonio Jose Alarcon Gonzalez
- (Colombia) Kevin Rios Quintana
- (Colombia) Steven Cuesta
- (Colombia) Juan Carrero

(Hong Kong) HKSI Pro Cycling Team

- (Hong Kong) Leung Chun Wing
- (Hong Kong) Ho Burr
- (Hong Kong) Choy Hiu Fung
- (Hong Kong) Mow Ching Yin
- (Hong Kong) Leung Ka Yu
- (Hong Kong) Ko Siu Wai

(Australia) IsoWhey Sports SwissWellness

- (Australia) Sean Lake
- (Australia) Anthony Giacoppo
- (Australia) Robbie Hucker
- (Australia) Neil Van der Ploeg
- (Australia) Sam Crome

(Latvia) Rietumu Banka–Riga

- (Latvia) Māris Bogdanovičs
- (Latvia) Andris Vosekalns
- (Latvia) Armands Bēcis
- (Latvia) Deins Kaņepējs
- (Latvia) Uldis Ālītis

(Taiwan) RTS–Monton Racing Team

- (Colombia) Mauricio Ortega
- (Italy) Eugenio Bani
- (Italy) Paolo Lunardon
- (Colombia) Oscar Mauricio Pachón
- (Greece) Polychronis Tzortzakis
- (Colombia) Cristian Andres Peña

(Japan) Team Ukyo

- (Spain) Jon Aberasturi
- (Japan) Michimasa Nakai
- (Japan) Yusuke Hatanaka
- (Japan) Eiichi Hirai
- (Japan) Tanzo Tokuda

(United Kingdom) WIGGINS

- (United Kingdom) James Knox
- (United Kingdom) Scott Davies
- (United Kingdom) Joey Walker
- (United Kingdom) Etienne Georgi
- (United Kingdom) Robert Scott
- (United Kingdom) Jake Kelly

(Malaysia) Terengganu Cycling Team

- (Malaysia) Anuar Manan
- (Malaysia) Che ku Mohammad Nazmi Che Ku Romli
- (Mongolia) Maral-Erdene Batmunkh
- (Malaysia) Mohd Nor Umardi Rosdi
- (Singapore) Goh Choon Huat
- (Malaysia) Muhammad Nur Aimin Mohd Zariff

(China) Yunnan Lvshan Landscape–Taishan Pardus

- (China) Fan Xiaojun
- (China) Li Wenjie
- (China) Yu Benneng
- (China) Zhong Zirong
- (China) Meng Juntao
- (China) Zhang Lianshan

Japan

- (Japan) Yukiya Arashiro
- (Japan) Hideto Nakane
- (Japan) Rei Onodera
- (Japan) Shotaro Iribe
- (Japan) Masaki Yamamoto
- (Japan) Masahiro Ishigami

Romania

- (Romania) Lars Pria
- (Romania) Valentin Plesea
- (Romania) Eduard-Michael Grosu
- (Romania) Daniel Crista
- (Romania) Emil Dima
