= Leonel Quintero =

Venezuelan racing cyclist

Personal information
- Full name: Leonel Alexander Quintero Arteaga
- Born: 13 March 1997 (age 29) Nirgua, Venezuela

Cycling career
- Sport: Cycling
- Current team: Victoire Hiroshima
- Discipline: Road
- Role: Rider

Amateur teams
- 2016–2018: Gobierno de Yaracuy–Cavebici
- 2018: Bicicletas Castilla–Fedeindustria
- 2019: Gobernación de Mirand–Trek
- 2020: Venezuela Pais de Futuro–Fina Arroz–NR Osorio

Professional teams
- 2018: St George Continental Cycling Team
- 2019: Inteja Imca–Ridea
- 2019: St George Continental Cycling Team
- 2020: Matrix Powertag
- 2021–2022: Matrix Powertag
- 2023–: Victoire Hiroshima

Leonel Alexander Quintero Arteaga (born 13 March 1997) is a Venezuelan cyclist, who rides for UCI Continental team Victoire Hiroshima.

== Major results ==
2015
National Junior Road Championships

1st Road race
3rd Time trial

2016
3rd Overall Vuelta al Zulia
2017
Vuelta a Venezuela

1st Stage 4
1st Sprints classification

National Under-23 Road Championships

1st Time trial
2nd Road race

3rd Team pursuit, Bolivarian Games
National Road Championships

4th Road race
5th Time trial

10th Road race, Pan American Under-23 Road Championships
2018
2nd Team pursuit, Central American and Caribbean Games
4th Overall Vuelta a Venezuela

1st Young rider classification

2019
1st Clásico Ciudad de Valencia
2020
1st Japan Pro Tour
1st Stage 1 Hiroshima Forest Park Road Race
6th Overall Vuelta al Táchira

1st Points classification
1st Stages 4 & 8

2022
1st Points classification, Tour of Japan
6th Overall Tour de Kumano

1st Stage 2

2023
6th Overall Tour of Japan

1st Mountains classification

6th Overall Tour de Kyushu
2024
8th Overall Tour de Kumano
2025
6th Overall Tour of Japan
8th Oita Urban Classic
