= Ben Dyball =

Australian bicycle racer

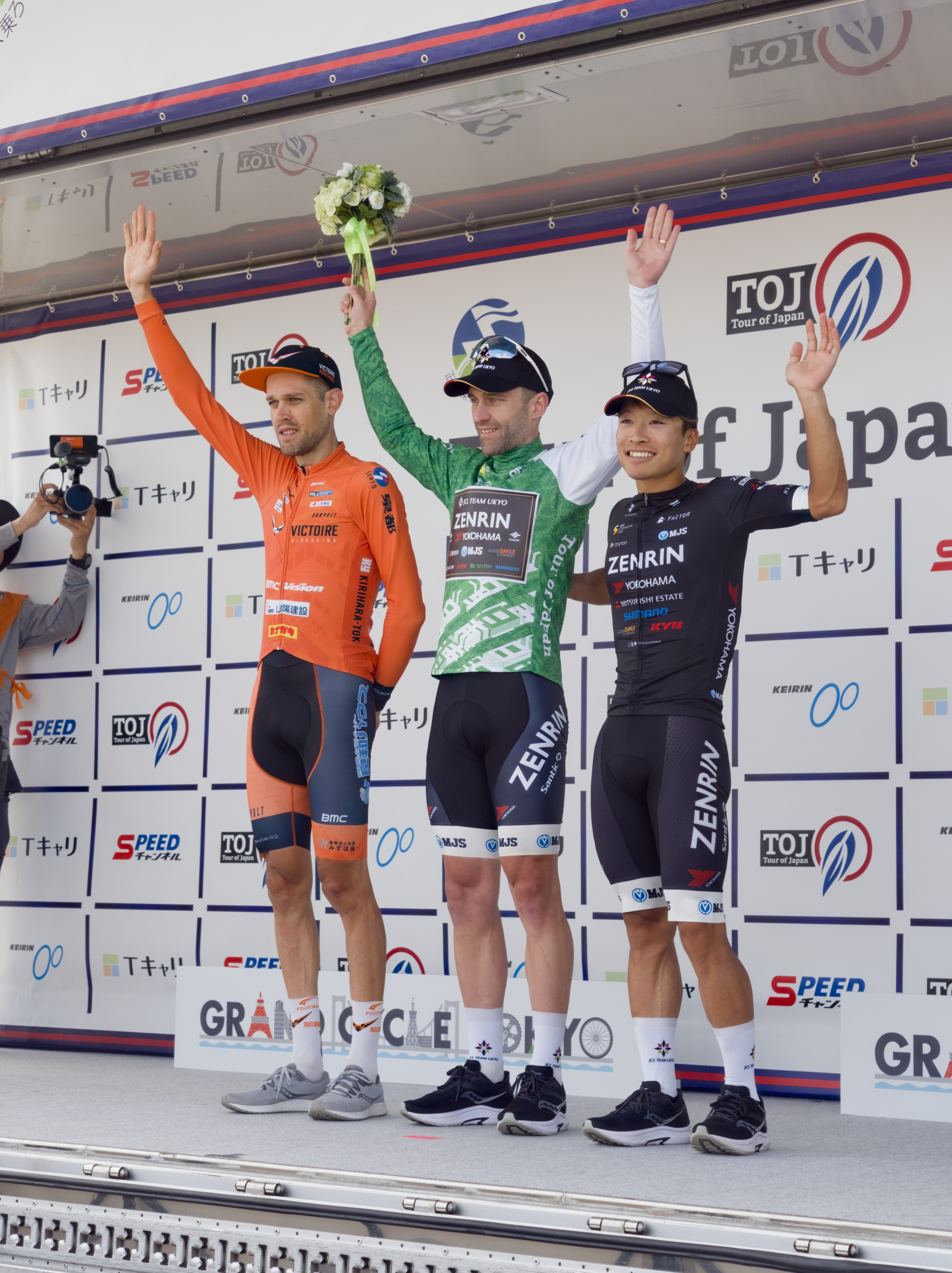
- Dyball (left) at the 2023 Tour of Japan

Personal information
- Full name: Benjamin Dyball
- Born: 20 April 1989 (age 37) Blacktown, Australia
- Height: 1.82 m (6 ft 0 in)
- Weight: 63 kg (139 lb)

Cycling career
- Sport: Cycling
- Current team: Victoire Hiroshima
- Discipline: Road
- Role: Rider
- Rider type: Climber

Amateur team
- 2016: AC Bisontine

Professional teams
- 2011: Team Jayco–AIS
- 2012–2015: Genesys Wealth Advisers
- 2017–2018: St George Continental Cycling Team
- 2017: Delko–Marseille Provence KTM (stagiaire)
- 2019: Team Sapura Cycling
- 2020: NTT Pro Cycling
- 2021–2022: Team UKYO
- 2023–: Victoire Hiroshima

Benjamin Dyball (born 20 April 1989 in Blacktown) is an Australian cyclist, who currently rides for UCI Continental team Victoire Hiroshima. In October 2020, he was named in the startlist for the 2020 Vuelta a España.

== Major results ==
2009
9th Time trial, Oceania Under-23 Road Championships
2011
1st Road race, National Under-23 Road Championships
10th Gran Premio Palio del Recioto
2013
Oceania Road Championships

2nd Time trial
6th Road race

2nd Overall New Zealand Cycle Classic
5th Overall Tour of Japan

1st Stage 4

2014
2nd Overall Tour of Tasmania

1st Stage 1

4th Road race, National Road Championships
Oceania Road Championships

4th Time trial
10th Road race

10th Overall New Zealand Cycle Classic
2015
8th Time trial, Oceania Road Championships
2016
1st Overall Tour of Tasmania

1st Stage 3

3rd Time trial, Oceania Road Championships
3rd Taiwan KOM Challenge
2017
2nd Time trial, Oceania Road Championships
3rd Time trial, National Road Championships
10th Overall Tour du Jura
2018
1st Overall Tour of Thailand

1st Mountains classification
1st Stage 3

1st Overall Tour de Ijen

1st Mountains classification
1st Stage 4

2nd Overall Tour de Kumano
2nd Overall Tour of Taihu Lake
2nd Overall Tour of Fuzhou
2nd Taiwan KOM Challenge
3rd Overall Tour de Langkawi
3rd Overall Tour de Siak

1st Stage 2

8th Overall Tour de Indonesia
2019
Oceania Road Championships

1st Road race
1st Time trial

1st Overall Tour de Langkawi

1st Stage 4

1st Stage 5 Tour de Indonesia
1st Peaks Challenge Falls Creek
2nd Taiwan KOM Challenge
3rd Overall Tour of Qinghai Lake

1st Stage 7 (ITT)

3rd Overall Tour de Tochigi

1st Stage 1 (ITT)

7th Overall Tour de Iskandar Johor
8th Overall Tour de Ijen
2022
1st Overall Tour de Taiwan

1st Stage 2

2nd Overall Tour of Japan

1st Stage 2

3rd Japan Cup
8th Overall Tour de Kumano
2023
1st Taiwan KOM Challenge
2nd Overall Tour of Japan
2nd Mine Akiyoshi-dai Karst International Road Race
4th Time trial, Oceania Road Championships
5th Overall Tour de Kyushu
5th Oita Urban Classic
2024
1st Grand Prix Kaisareia
3rd Time trial, Oceania Road Championships
3rd Overall Tour of Japan
2025
3rd Overall Tour of Japan
4th Tour de Okinawa

=== Grand Tour general classification results timeline ===
Grand Tour	2020
Giro d'Italia	—
Tour de France	—
Vuelta a España	130

Legend
—	Did not compete
DNF	Did not finish
