= Loïc Desriac =

French road cyclist

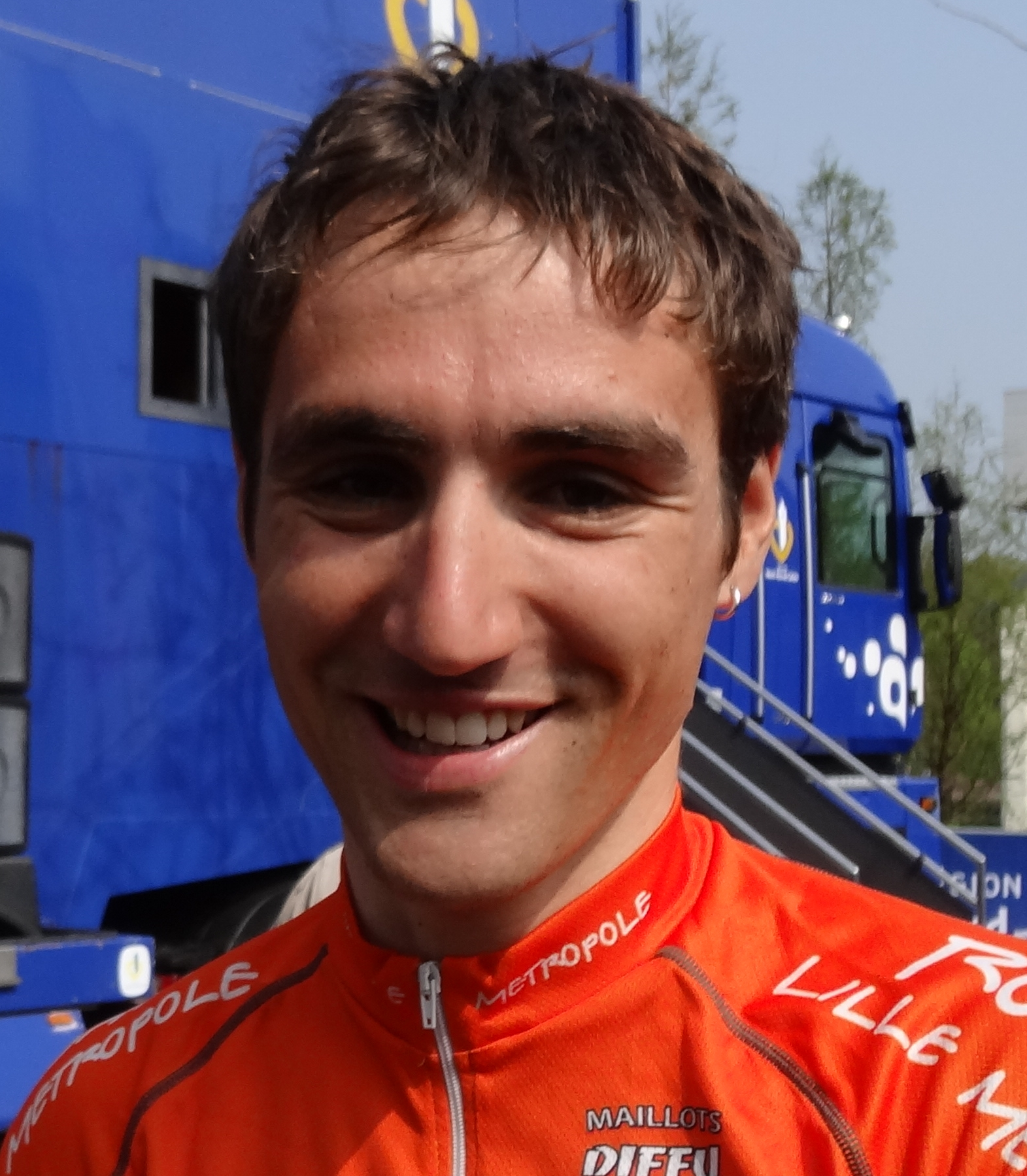
- Desriac at the 2013 Four Days of Dunkirk

Personal information
- Born: 21 July 1989 (age 37) Villeneuve-Saint-Georges, France

Cycling career
- Sport: Cycling
- Current team: Dược Domesco Đồng Tháp
- Discipline: Road
- Role: Rider

Amateur teams
- 2007: Revel SC
- 2008–2009: Albi VS
- 2009: Ag2r–La Mondiale (stagiaire)
- 2010: CC Étupes
- 2014: GSC Blagnac Vélo Sport 31
- 2016: Neilpryde–Nanshin Subaru
- 2017–2018: Bikelife Đồng Nai
- 2019–2021: Bikelife Đồng Nai
- 2022–: Dược Domesco Đồng Tháp

Professional teams
- 2011–2013: Roubaix–Lille Métropole
- 2015: Kinan Cycling Team
- 2016: Singha Infinite Cycling Team
- 2018: Yunnan Lvshan Landscape

Loïc Desriac (born 21 July 1989) is a French road cyclist, who currently rides for Vietnamese amateur team Dược Domesco Đồng Tháp.

== Major results ==
2007
1st Overall Trophée Centre Morbihan
1st Bernaudeau Junior
4th Overall La Coupe du Président de la Ville de Grudziądz
2009
1st Stage 1 Coupe des nations Ville Saguenay
9th Paris–Tours Espoirs
2010
4th Paris–Tours Espoirs
9th Paris–Roubaix Espoirs
10th Paris–Troyes
2011
6th Grand Prix de la ville de Pérenchies
9th Ronde van Vlaanderen U23
2012
3rd Ronde Pévéloise
5th Grand Prix de la Somme
9th Chrono des Nations
10th Overall Boucles de la Mayenne
2013
8th Grand Prix de la Somme
2014
1st Stage 3 Tour du Maroc
2015
1st Mountains classification Tour de Hokkaido
9th Overall Tour du Loir-et-Cher
2016
5th Tour de Jakarta
8th Overall Sharjah International Cycling Tour
10th Overall Tour de Singkarak
2017
4th Overall Tour de Singkarak
4th Overall Tour de Ijen
2019
2nd Overall Tour de Selangor
4th Overall Tour de Siak
4th Overall Tour de Singkarak
