= Ryan Cavanagh =

Australian cyclist (born 1995)

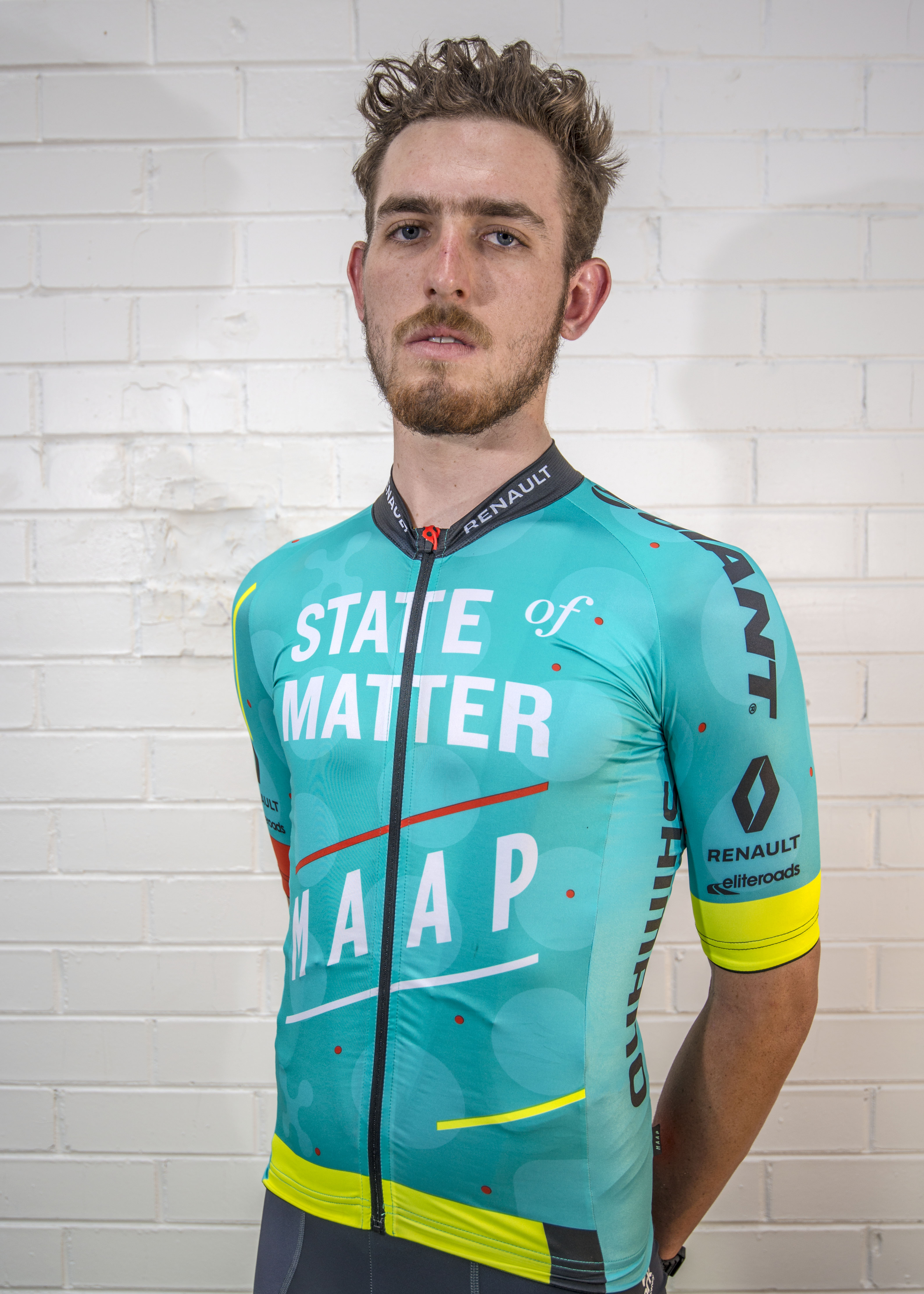

Personal information
- Full name: Ryan Cavanagh
- Nickname: Hoo Haa Cavanagh
- Born: 22 November 1995 (age 30) Sunshine Coast, Queensland, Australia
- Height: 1.83 m (6 ft 0 in)
- Weight: 72 kg (159 lb)

Cycling career
- Sport: Cycling
- Current team: Kinan Racing Team
- Discipline: Road
- Role: Rider

Amateur teams
- 2014: Sunshine Coast CC
- 2015: Jayco–AIS–WTA

Professional teams
- 2016: State of Matter MAAP Racing
- 2017: New South Wales Institute of Sport
- 2018–2021: St George Continental Cycling Team
- 2022: Victoire Hiroshima
- 2023–: Kinan Racing Team

Ryan Cavanagh (born 22 November 1995) is an Australian cyclist, who currently rides for UCI Continental team Kinan Racing Team.

== Major results ==
2013
1st Road race, Oceania Junior Road Championships
2014
1st Overall Tour of Poyang Lake
2016
1st Overall Battle on the Border
2017
1st Team time trial, Queensland State Road Championships
1st Overall Amy's Otway Tour

1st Stage 1

1st Launceston International Classic
1st Stage 3 Tour of Tasmania
2018
1st Charles Coin Memorial
1st Stage 5 Tour de Singkarak
1st Stage 1 Battle Refill
4th Overall Tour de Siak
10th Overall Tour de Kumano
2019
1st Overall Tour of Thailand

1st Stage 3

1st Overall Tour of Quanzhou Bay

1st Points classification

2020
2nd Overall Tour de Taiwan

1st Stage 2

2022
Tour de Kumano

1st Stage 3
1st Points classification

7th Overall Tour of Japan
8th Oita Urban Classic
2023
1st Oita Urban Classic
7th Overall Tour de Kyushu
2024
Oceania Road Championships

1st Road race
6th Time trial

1st Stage 1 Tour de Ijen
7th Overall Tour de Kumano
