= 2021 Delko season =

Delko
- 2021 season
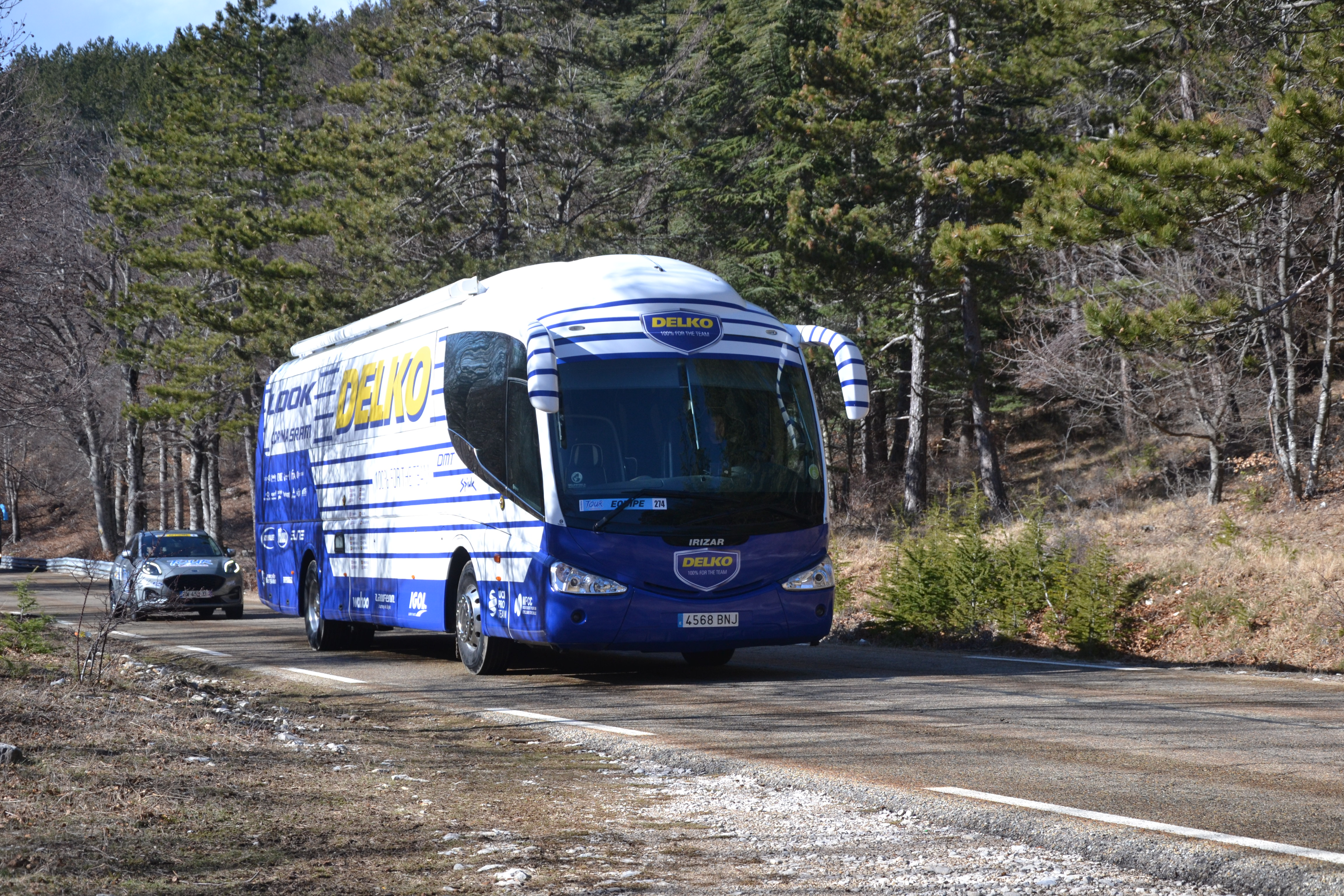
- The Delko team bus near Chalet Reynard on Stage 3 of the 2021 Tour de la Provence
- UCI code: DKO
- Status: UCI ProTeam
- World Tour Rank: 28th
- Manager: Frédéric Rostaing (FRA)
- Main sponsor(s): Delko
- Based: France
- Bicycles: Look
- Groupset: SRAM

Season victories
- Stage race overall: 1
- Stage race stages: 2
- National Championships: 2
- Most wins: José Manuel Díaz (ESP) (2)
- Best ranked rider: José Manuel Díaz (ESP) (181st)
- Jersey

The 2021 season for Delko was the 47th season in the team's existence, the sixth as a UCI ProTeam, and the first under the current name. Japanese construction company Nippo Corporation, which had been a co-title sponsor last season, left the team to sponsor UCI WorldTeam EF Education–Nippo instead.

On 11 October, the team ceased operations with immediate effect due to financial difficulties.

== Team roster ==
As of 9 August 2021.

Rider	Date of birth
Pierre Barbier (FRA)	25 September 1997 (aged 23)
Clément Berthet (Note: Berthet joined AG2R Citroën Team on 1 August.) (FRA)	2 August 1997 (aged 23)
Clément Carisey (FRA)	23 March 1992 (aged 28)
Lucas De Rossi (FRA)	16 August 1995 (aged 25)
Yakob Debesay (ERI)	28 June 1999 (aged 21)
Alexandre Delettre (FRA)	25 October 1997 (aged 23)
José Manuel Díaz (ESP)	18 January 1995 (aged 25)
Alessandro Fedeli (ITA)	2 March 1996 (aged 24)
Delio Fernández (ESP)	17 February 1986 (aged 34)
Mauro Finetto (ITA)	10 May 1985 (aged 35)
Biniam Girmay (Note: Girmay was let go by the team and subsequently joined Intermarché–Wanty–Gobert Matériaux on 6 August.) (ERI)	2 April 2000 (aged 20)

Rider	Date of birth
José Gonçalves (POR)	13 February 1989 (aged 31)
Eduard-Michael Grosu (ROU)	4 September 1992 (aged 28)
Mulu Hailemichael (ETH)	12 January 1999 (aged 21)
August Jensen (NOR)	29 August 1991 (aged 29)
Justin Jules (FRA)	20 September 1986 (aged 34)
Mathias Le Turnier (FRA)	14 March 1995 (aged 25)
Atsushi Oka (Note: Oka was let go by the team on 28 April and subsequently joined their UCI Continental development side Nippo–Provence–PTS Conti two months later.) (JPN)	3 September 1995 (aged 25)
Eduard Prades (ESP)	9 August 1987 (aged 33)
Dušan Rajović (SRB)	19 November 1997 (aged 23)
Evaldas Šiškevičius (LTU)	30 December 1988 (aged 32)
Julien Trarieux (FRA)	19 August 1992 (aged 28)

Riders who joined the team for the 2021 season

Rider	2020 team
Clément Berthet	neo-pro (mountain biker)
Clément Carisey	Pro Immo Nicolas Roux
Yakob Debesay	neo-pro (Équipe Continentale Groupama–FDJ)
Alexandre Delettre	neo-pro (VC Villefranche Beaujolais)
August Jensen	Riwal Securitas
Mathias Le Turnier	Cofidis
Eduard Prades	Movistar Team

Riders who left the team during or after the 2020 season

Rider	2021 team
Fumiyuki Beppu	EF Education–Nippo
Clément Berthet	AG2R Citroën Team
Simon Carr	EF Education–Nippo
Romain Combaud	Team DSM
Julien El Fares	EF Education–Nippo
Biniam Girmay	Intermarché–Wanty–Gobert Matériaux
Masahiro Ishigami	Nippo–Provence–PTS Conti
Riccardo Minali	Intermarché–Wanty–Gobert Matériaux
Hideto Nakane	EF Education–Nippo
Ramūnas Navardauskas	Retired
Atsushi Oka	Nippo–Provence–PTS Conti
Rémy Rochas	Cofidis

== Season victories ==
Date	Race	Competition	Rider	Country	Location	Ref.
7 February	Étoile de Bessèges, Mountains classification	UCI Europe Tour	Alexandre Delettre (FRA)	France		
15 April	Presidential Tour of Turkey, Stage 5	UCI Europe Tour; UCI ProSeries	José Manuel Díaz (ESP)	Turkey	Elmalı	
18 April	Presidential Tour of Turkey, Overall	UCI Europe Tour; UCI ProSeries	José Manuel Díaz (ESP)	Turkey		
18 April	Presidential Tour of Turkey, Team classification	UCI Europe Tour; UCI ProSeries	(Note: The riders in the squad were Pierre Barbier, Clément Berthet, José Manuel Díaz, Delio Fernández, Mauro Finetto, Eduard-Michael Grosu, and Mathias Le Turnier)	Turkey		
30 May	Boucles de la Mayenne, Team classification	UCI Europe Tour; UCI ProSeries	(Note: The riders in the squad were Pierre Barbier, Alexandre Delettre, Alessandro Fedeli, Eduard Prades, Dušan Rajović, and Julien Trarieux.)	France		
27 August	Tour Poitou-Charentes en Nouvelle-Aquitaine, Stage 5	UCI Europe Tour	Clément Carisey (FRA)	France	Poitiers	

== National, Continental, and World Champions ==
Date	Discipline	Jersey	Rider	Country	Location	Ref.
18 June	Lithuanian National Time Trial Championships		Evaldas Šiškevičius (LTU)	Lithuania	Utena	
20 June	Serbian National Road Race Championships		Dušan Rajović (SRB)	Serbia	Kraljevo	
