= Benjamín Prades =

Spanish cyclist

Benjamí Prades
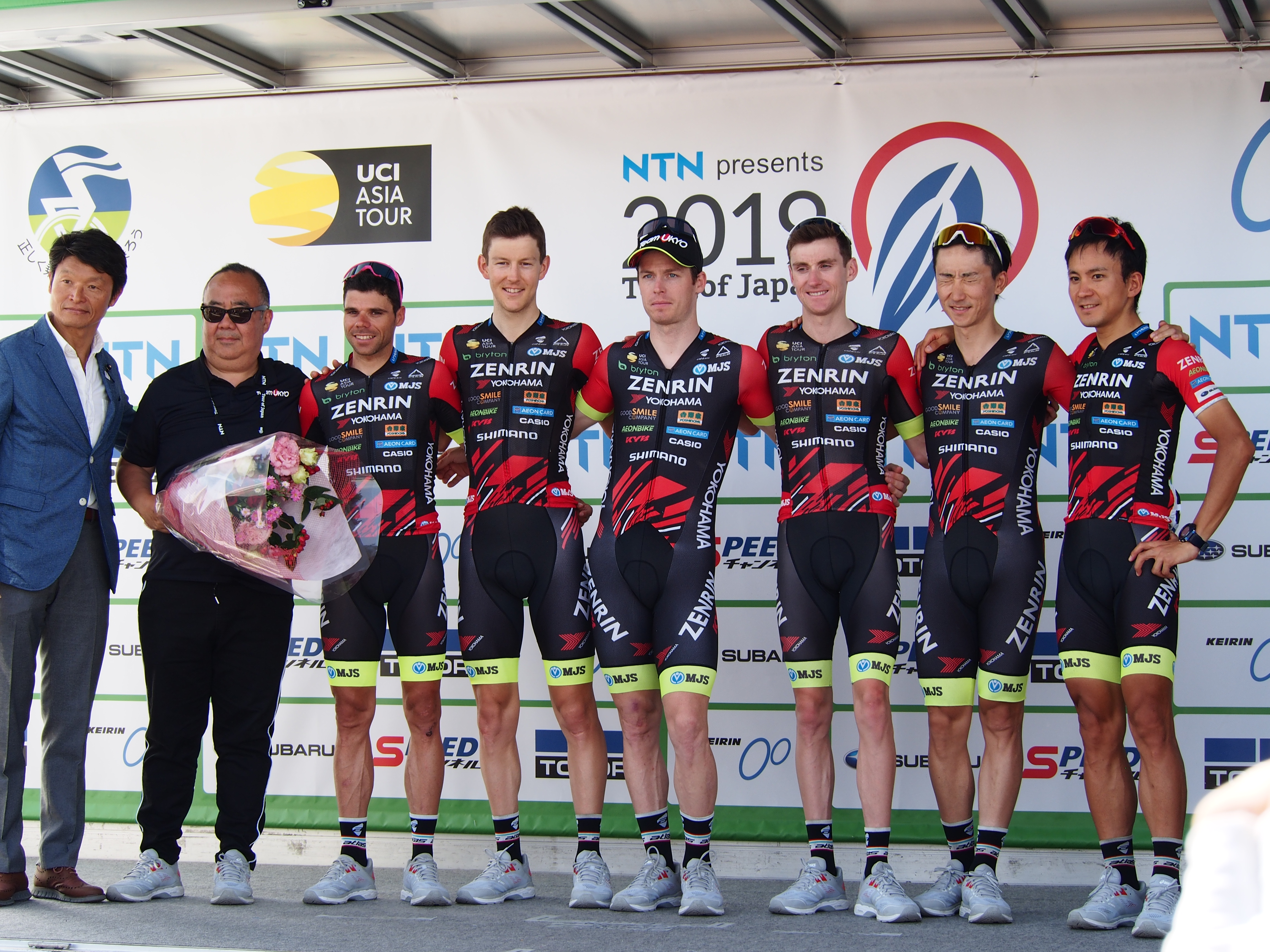
- Benjamín Prades (third from the right) with his JCL Team Ukyo team members after winning the overall team time classification in the 2019 Tour of Japan

Personal information
- Full name: Benjamí Prades Reverte
- Born: October 26, 1983 (age 42) Socuéllamos, Spain
- Height: 1.68 m (5 ft 6 in)
- Weight: 56 kg (123 lb)

Cycling career
- Sport: Cycling
- Current team: VC Fukuoka
- Discipline: Road
- Role: Rider

Amateur teams
- 2021: Vigo Rías Baixas
- 2021: Inteja Imca DCT
- 2022: Controlpack–Badia

Professional teams
- 2014–2015: Matrix Powertag
- 2016–2020: Team UKYO
- 2022–2023: Team UKYO
- 2024–: VC Fukuoka

Benjamí Prades Reverte (born October 26, 1983, in Socuéllamos) is a Spanish cyclist, who currently rides for UCI Continental team VC Fukuoka. His brother Eduard Prades is also a professional cyclist.

== Major results ==
2011
6th Overall Cinturó de l'Empordà
2013
1st Stage 1 Tour of Galicia
2014
9th Overall Tour of Japan
9th Tour de Okinawa
2015
1st Overall Tour de Kumano

1st Stage 2

1st Stage 3 Tour of Japan
2nd Overall Tour de Ijen

1st Points classification
1st Stage 2

3rd Tour de Okinawa
6th Overall Tour de Hokkaido
8th Japan Cup
2016
2nd Overall Tour de Flores

1st Points classification
1st Stage 5

2nd Overall Tour de Kumano
4th Tour de Okinawa
5th Overall Tour de Ijen

1st Stage 2

7th Japan Cup
8th Overall Tour de Taiwan
8th Overall Tour de Hokkaido
2017
1st Overall Tour de Taiwan

1st Mountains classification

2nd Overall Tour of Hainan
2nd Overall Tour de Lombok
2nd Prueba Villafranca de Ordizia
2nd Japan Cup
10th Overall Tour of China I
10th Circuito de Getxo
2018
3rd Overall Tour de Kumano
5th Oita Urban Classic
6th Overall Tour of Hainan
7th Overall Tour of Japan
8th Overall Tour de Tochigi
2019
2nd Overall Tour of Japan
3rd Tour de Okinawa
5th Road race, National Road Championships
5th Overall Tour de Ijen
7th Overall Tour de Kumano
8th Overall Tour de Korea
2021
9th Overall Tour de Guadeloupe
2022
1st Tour de Okinawa
2023
1st Mine Akiyoshi-dai Karst International Road Race
3rd Overall Tour de Taiwan
4th Overall Tour of Japan
4th Overall Tour de Kyushu

1st Mountains classification

6th Overall Tour de Kumano
2024
1st Stage 2 Tour de Kumano
1st Stage 3 Tour of Bostonliq
2nd Tour of Alanya
3rd Grand Prix Syedra Ancient City
3rd Overall Tour of Ijen
4th Overall Tour of Mersin

1st Stage 3

9th Oita Urban Classic
2025
1st Overall Tour de Ijen

1st Stage 4

1st Stage 7 Tour of Japan
2nd The Road Race Tokyo Tama
3rd Grand Prix Syedra Ancient City
3rd Grand Prix Aspendos
4th Grand Prix Antalya
4th Overall Tour de Kumano
7th Tour de Okinawa
9th Oita Urban Classic
2026
2nd Grand Prix Syedra Ancient City
3rd Overall Tour of Japan
4th Grand Prix Apollon Temple
7th Grand Prix Pedalia
