= Marino Kobayashi =

Japanese cyclist (born 1994)

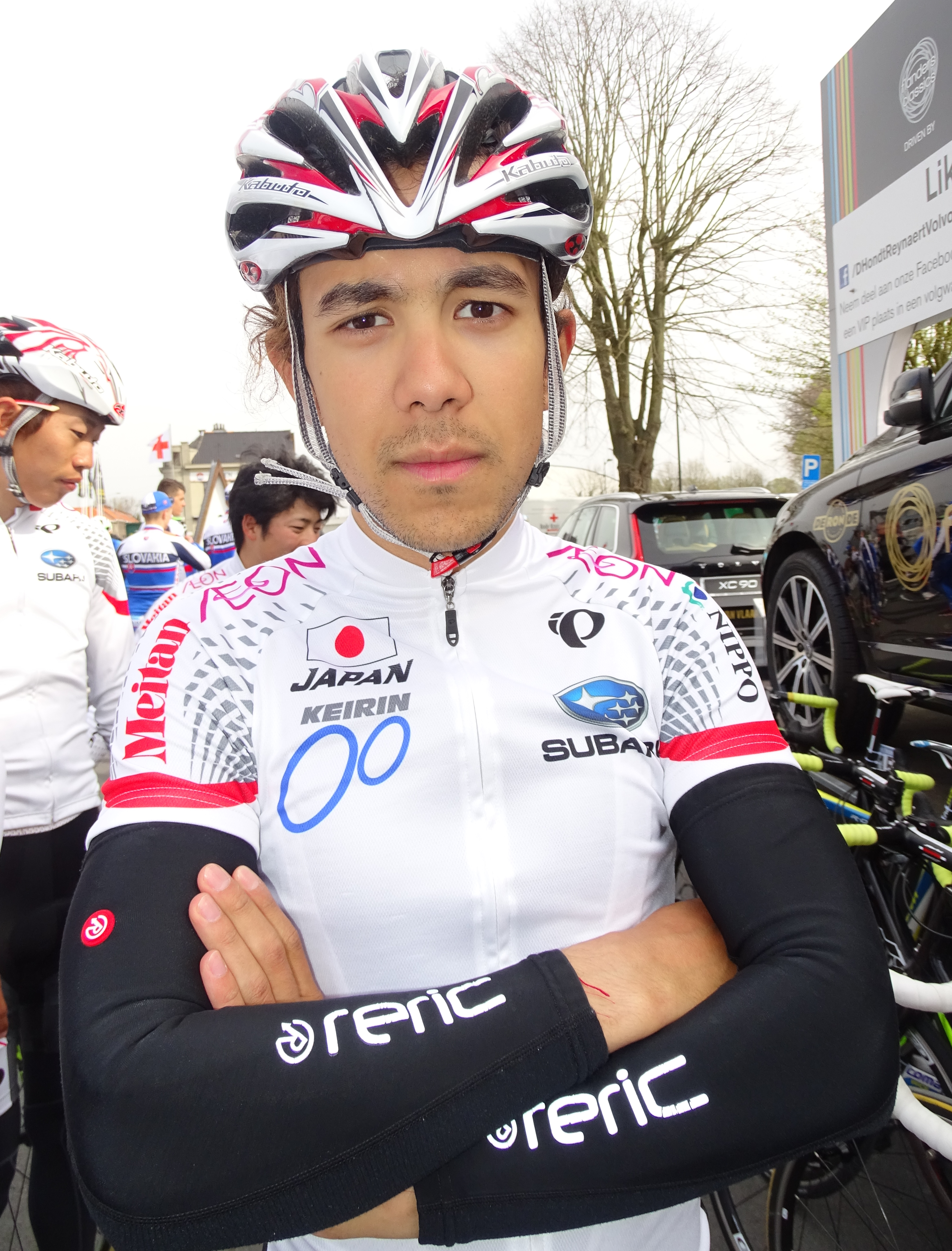
- Kobayashi in 2016.

Personal information
- Full name: Marino Kobayashi
- Born: 1 July 1994 (age 32) Urayasu, Japan

Cycling career
- Sport: Cycling
- Current team: Retired
- Discipline: Road
- Role: Rider

Amateur teams
- 2013: Vax Racing–Saitama
- 2014: Neilpryde–Men's Club
- 2015–2016: Rimo–Costrucciones Paulino

Professional teams
- 2016: Nippo–Vini Fantini (stagiaire)
- 2017–2018: Nippo–Vini Fantini
- 2019–2020: Giotti Victoria–Palomar
- 2021–2024: Matrix Powertag
- 2025: Team UKYO

Major wins
- One-day races and Classics National Road Race Championships (2024, 2025)

Marino Kobayashi (小林 海, Kobayashi Marino; born 1 July 1994) is a former-professional Japanese cyclist, who last rode for UCI Continental team Team UKYO.

== Major results ==
2016
National Under-23 Road Championships

1st Road race
1st Time trial

2017
5th Time trial, National Road Championships
2019
8th Overall Tour of Japan
2021
7th Overall Tour of Japan
7th Oita Urban Classic
2022
3rd Overall Tour de Kumano
5th Overall Tour of Japan

1st Mountains classification

2024
1st Road race, National Road Championships
1st Mountains classification, Tour de Kumano
4th Oita Urban Classic
7th Overall Tour of Japan
2025
1st Road race, National Road Championships
