= José Vicente Toribio =

Spanish bicycle racer

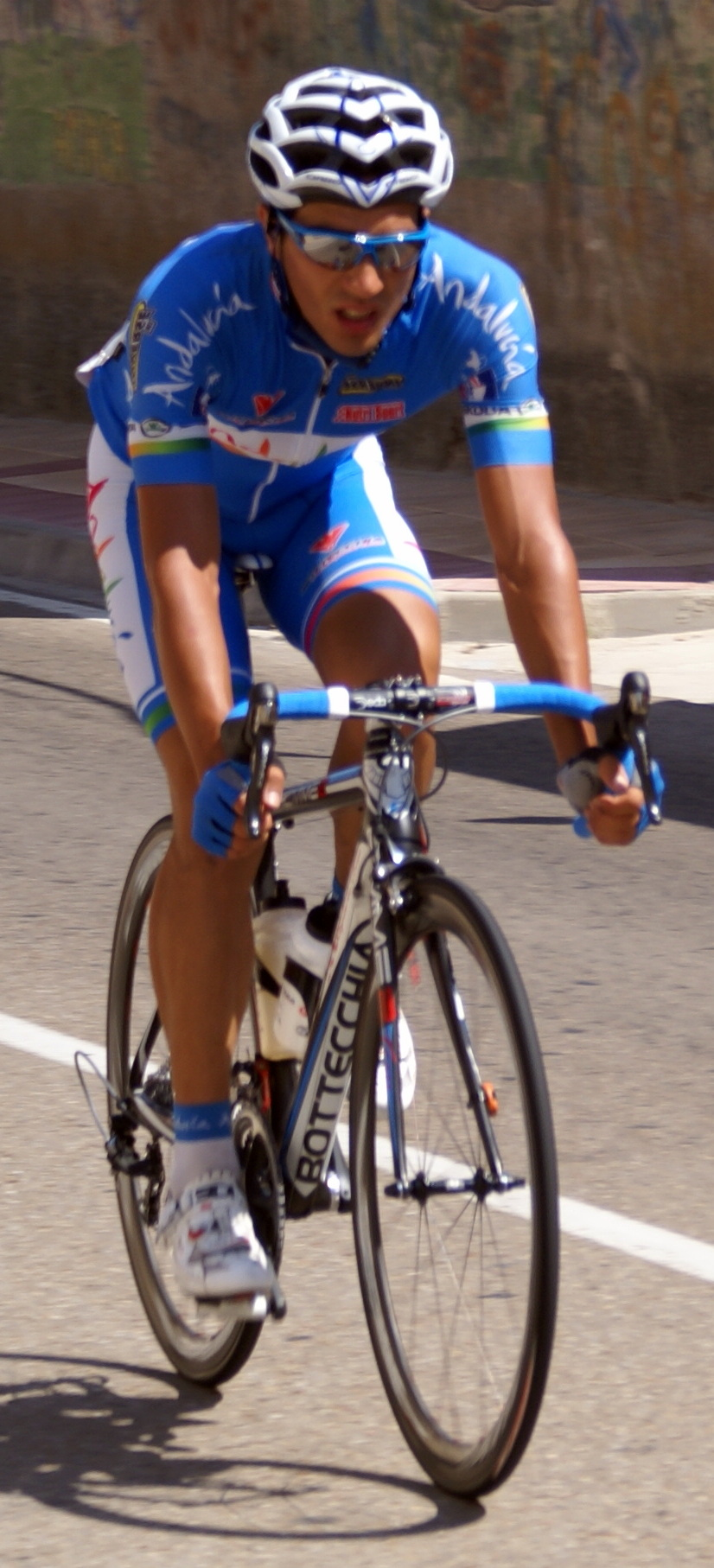
- Toribio at the 2012 Vuelta a España

Personal information
- Full name: José Vicente Toribio Alcolea
- Born: December 22, 1985 (age 40) Socuéllamos, Spain
- Height: 1.75 m (5 ft 9 in)
- Weight: 64 kg (141 lb)

Cycling career
- Sport: Cycling
- Current team: Matrix Powertag
- Discipline: Road
- Role: Rider

Professional teams
- 2008: Burgos Monumental
- 2010–2012: Andalucía–Cajasur
- 2013–2014: Team UKYO
- 2015–: Matrix Powertag

José Vicente Toribio Alcolea (born 22 December 1985 in Socuéllamos) is a Spanish cyclist, who currently rides for UCI Continental team Matrix Powertag. He has ridden in 3 editions of the Vuelta a España.

== Major results ==
2005
9th Gran Premio Área Metropolitana de Vigo
2008
4th Overall Vuelta a Navarra
2009
1st Overall Volta a Coruña

1st Stage 3

2011
1st Stage 4 Volta a Portugal
2012
6th Overall Vuelta a Castilla y León
8th Vuelta a La Rioja
2013
1st Overall Tour de East Java

1st Mountains classification
1st Stage 2

2nd Tour de Okinawa
5th Overall Tour de Hokkaido
7th Overall Tour de Kumano
2014
2nd Overall Tour de Kumano
2nd Tour de Okinawa
4th Overall Tour of Japan
2015
4th Overall Tour de Hokkaido
5th Overall Tour de Kumano
7th Tour de Okinawa
2016
4th Overall Tour de Kumano
2017
1st Overall Tour de Kumano
3rd Overall Tour de Hokkaido
4th Overall Tour of Japan
4th Overall Tour de Tochigi
10th Tour de Okinawa
2018
7th Overall Tour de Kumano
8th Overall Tour of Japan
2019
3rd Overall Tour of Japan
4th Overall Tour de Hokkaido
7th Overall Tour de Tochigi
10th Overall Tour de Kumano
2021
8th Overall Tour of Japan

1st Stage 2

2022
3rd Tour de Okinawa
4th Oita Urban Classic
5th Overall Tour de Kumano
9th Overall Tour de Hokkaido
2023
5th Overall Tour de Kumano
7th Oita Urban Classic
10th Overall Tour of Japan

=== Grand Tour general classification results timeline ===
Grand Tour	2010	2011	2012
Giro d'Italia	—	—	—
Tour de France	—	—	—
Vuelta a España	129	133	133

Legend
—	Did not compete
DNF	Did not finish
