= Matthew Zenovich =

New Zealand bicycle racer

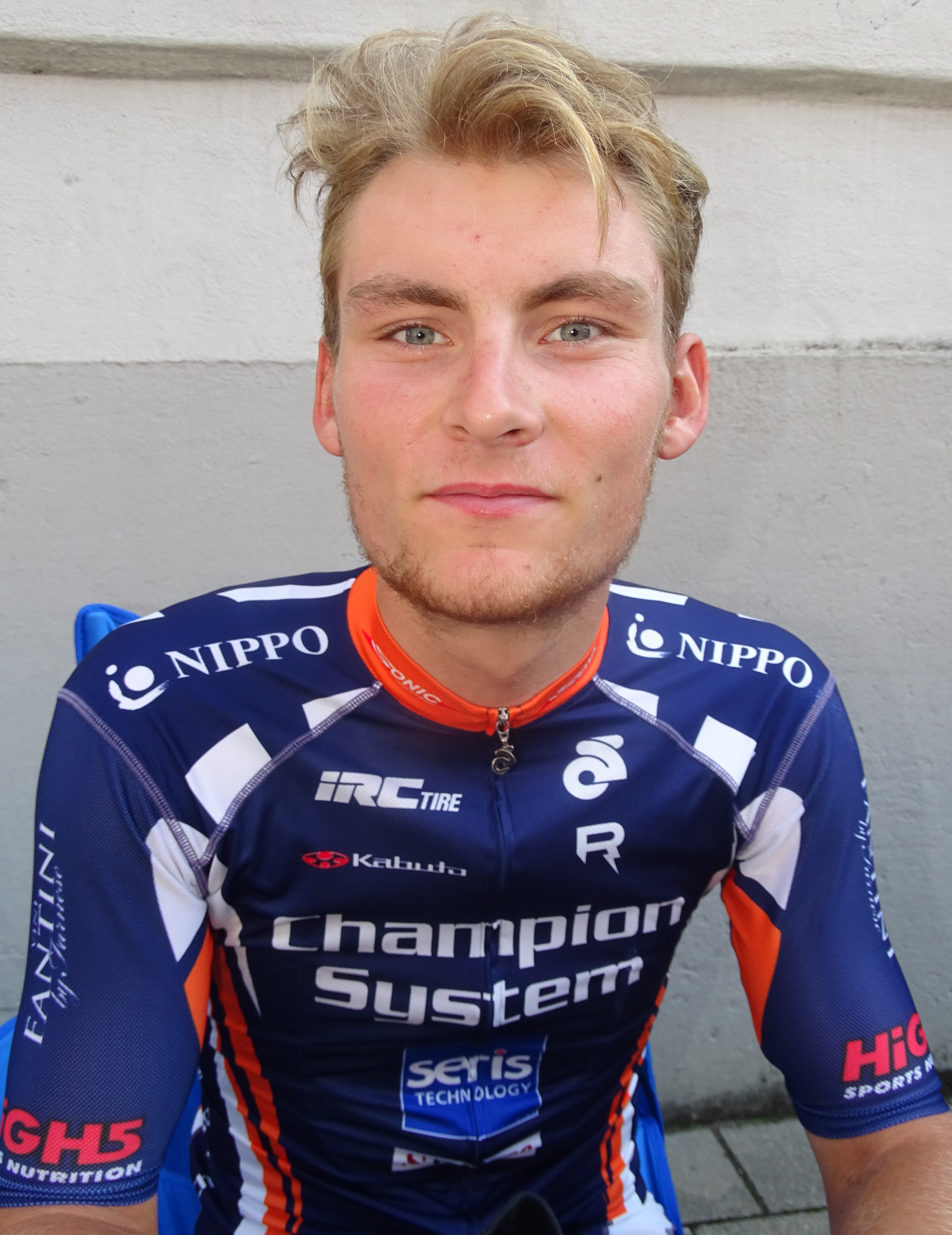
- Zenovich in 2015

Personal information
- Full name: Matthew Zenovich
- Born: 26 February 1994 (age 32)

Cycling career
- Sport: Cycling
- Current team: St George Continental Cycling Team
- Discipline: Road
- Role: Rider

Professional teams
- 2015: CCT p/b Champion System
- 2016: Avanti IsoWhey Sports
- 2017–: St George Continental Cycling Team

Matthew Zenovich (born 16 February 1994) is a New Zealand cyclist, who currently rides for UCI Continental team St George Continental Cycling Team.

== Major results ==
2013
7th Time trial, National Road Championships
2016
4th The REV Classic
2017
1st Stage 2 Tour de Ijen
9th Overall Tour of Taihu Lake
2018
1st Overall Tour de Siak

1st Stage 1

2019
8th Overall Tour de Iskandar Johor

1st Mountains classification

10th Overall New Zealand Cycle Classic
10th Overall Tour of Taihu Lake
