= Matrix Powertag =

Japanese cycling team

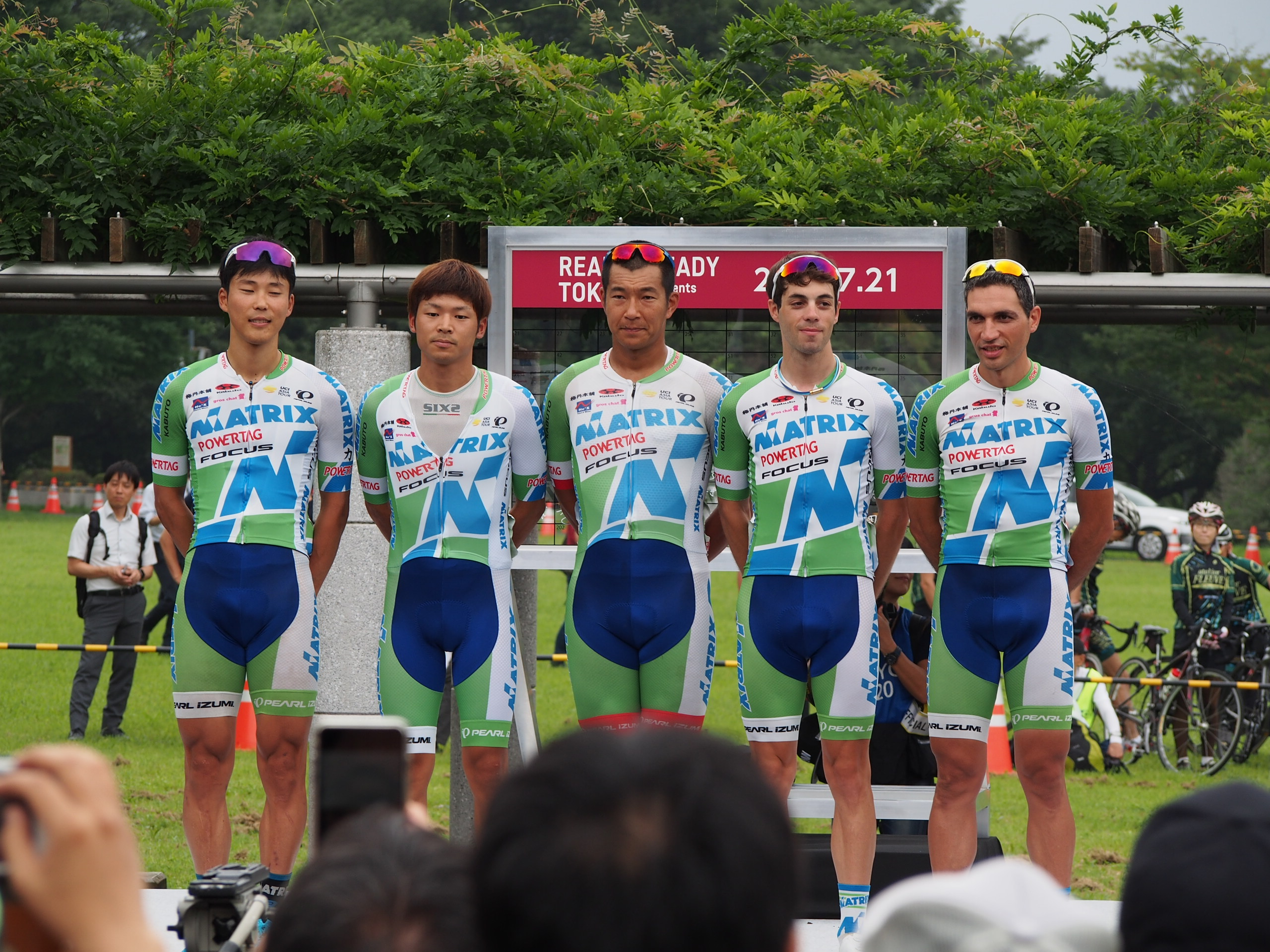
- The team in 2019

Team information
- UCI code: MTR
- Registered: Japan
- Founded: 2006
- Discipline: Road
- Status: Club
- Website: Team home page

Key personnel
- General manager: Masahiro Yasuhara

Team name history
- 2006 2007–: Matrix; Matrix Powertag

Matrix Powertag (マトリックスパワータグ, Matorikkusu Pawātagu) is a cycling team based in Japan formerly registered as UCI continental team in 2006–2025. It was founded in 2006. For the 2014 season, the team added several riders from Spain, including Eduard Prades for the last part of the season. Masahiro Yasuhara is currently the manager of the team.

== Team roster ==
As of 10 June 2023.

Rider	Date of birth
Georgios Bouglas (GRE)	17 November 1990 (age 35)
Tomoya Kano (JPN)	14 July 1973 (age 53)
Marino Kobayashi (JPN)	1 July 1994 (age 32)
Ryohei Komori (JPN)	26 September 1988 (age 37)
Francisco Mancebo (ESP)	9 March 1976 (age 50)

Rider	Date of birth
Edgar Nieto (ESP)	28 July 1986 (age 40)
Junya Sano (JPN)	9 January 1982 (age 44)
Kenji Takubo (JPN)	11 September 1995 (age 30)
José Vicente Toribio (ESP)	22 December 1985 (age 40)
Daiki Yasuhara (JPN)	12 August 1991 (age 35)

== Major wins ==
2007
Stage 2 Tour of Thailand, Masahiko Mifune
2011
Stage 2 Tour de Hokkaido, Takahiro Yamashita
2012
Stage 2 Tour of Małopolska, Mariusz Wiesiak
2014
Stage 5 Tour of Thailand, Sebastián Mora
2015
Stage 2 Tour de Ijen, Benjamín Prades
Stage 4 Tour of Japan, Benjamín Prades
Overall Tour de Kumano, Benjamín Prades

Stage 2, Benjamín Prades

2017
Overall Tour de Kumano, José Vicente Toribio

Young rider classification, Kenji Takubo

Tour de Okinawa, Junya Sano
2018
Stage 3 Tour de Kumano, Junya Sano
2019
Points classification Vuelta al Táchira, Orluis Aular

Stage 3, Orluis Aular

Overall Ronda Pilipinas, Francisco Mancebo

Stage 1, Francisco Mancebo

Overall Tour de Kumano, Orluis Aular

Points classification, Orluis Aular
Stage 1, Orluis Aular

2021
Stage 2 Tour of Japan, José Vicente Toribio
Oita Urban Classic, Francisco Mancebo
2022
Tour of Japan

Points classification, Leonel Quintero
Mountains classification, Marino Kobayashi

Stage 2 Tour de Kumano, Leonel Quintero
2023
Stage 2 Tour of Japan, Georgios Bouglas
