= Robbie Hucker =

Australian cyclist (born 1990)

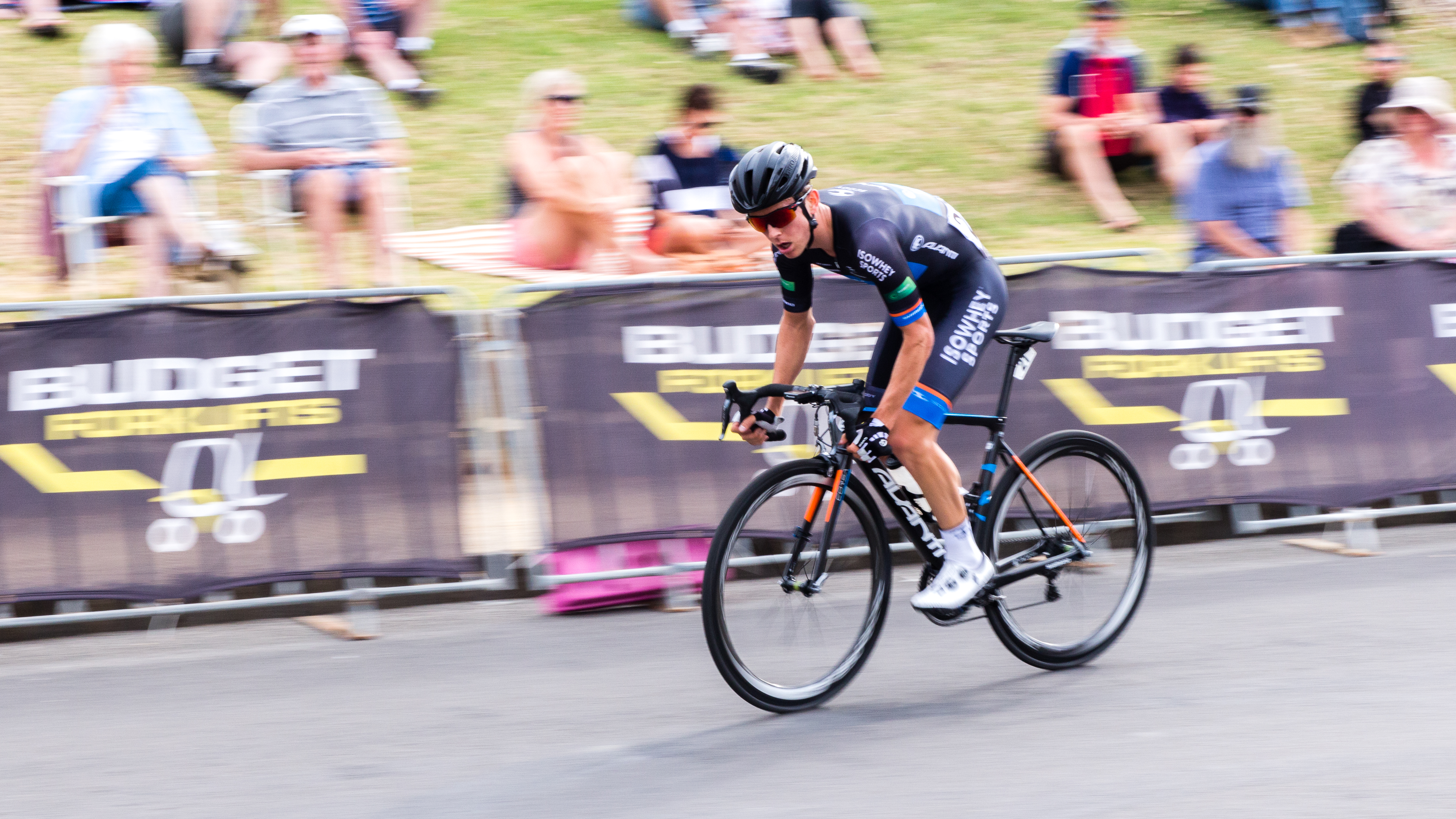
- Hucker in 2016

Personal information
- Full name: Robbie Hucker
- Born: 13 March 1990 (age 36) Australia
- Height: 1.81 m (5 ft 11 1/2 in)
- Weight: 68 kg (150 lb)

Cycling career
- Sport: Cycling
- Discipline: Road
- Role: Rider

Professional teams
- 2013–2015: Drapac Cycling
- 2016–2017: Avanti IsoWhey Sports
- 2018–2020: Team UKYO

Robbie Hucker (born 13 March 1990) is an Australian professional racing cyclist, who most recently rode for UCI Continental team Team UKYO.

== Major results ==
2013
10th Overall Tour of Japan
2016
1st Overall Tour de Taiwan

1st Stage 5

7th Overall Herald Sun Tour
2017
2nd Sun Hung Kai Properties Hong Kong Challenge
8th Road race, National Road Championships
10th Overall Tour of Hainan
2018
1st Stage 2 Tour de Taiwan
4th Overall Tour de Tochigi

1st Mountains classification

10th Japan Cup
2019
1st Overall Tour de Ijen
