= Atsushi Oka =

Japanese bicycle racer (born 1995)

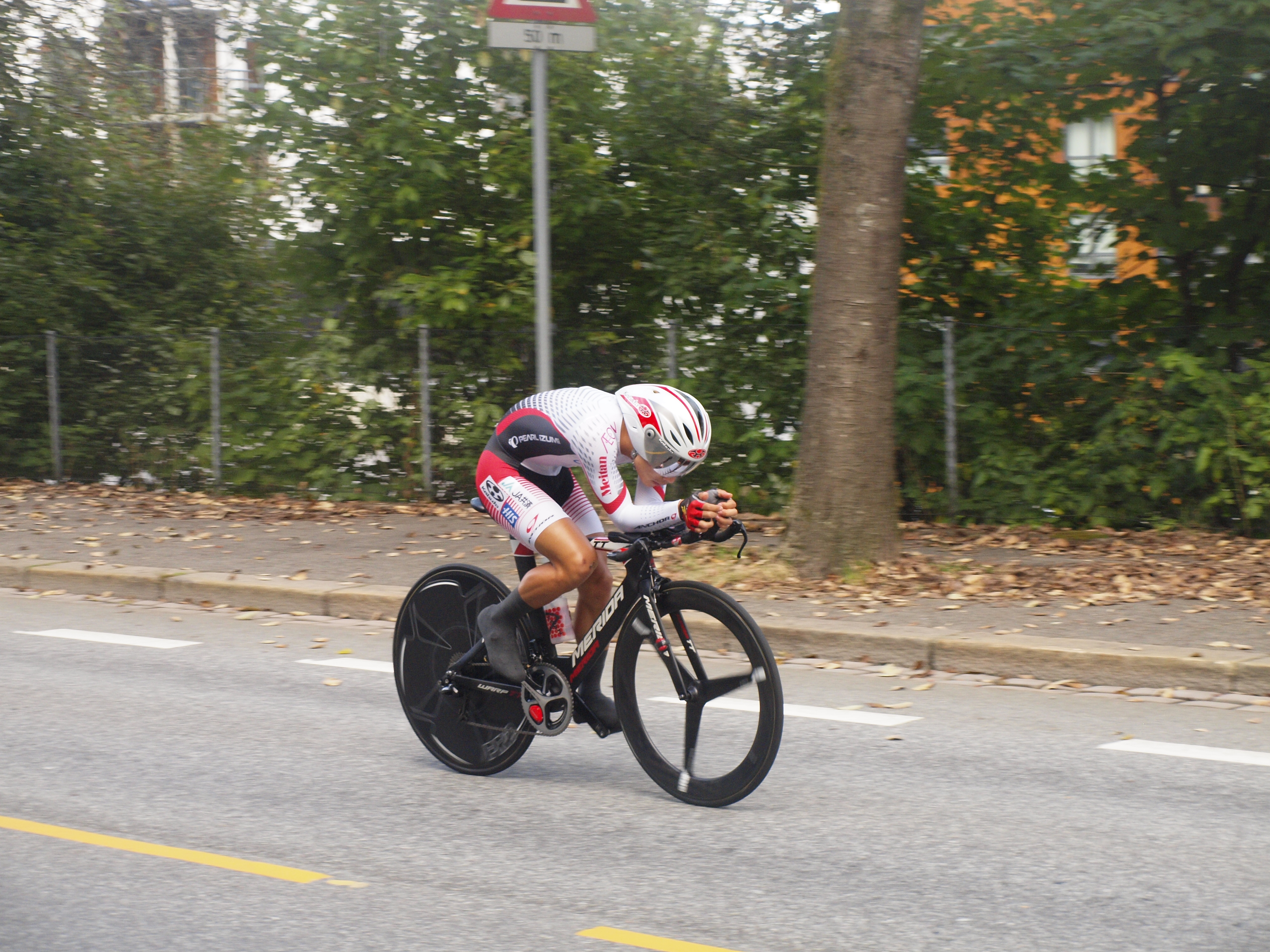
- Oka competing in the under–23 men's time trial at the 2017 UCI Road World Championships

Personal information
- Born: September 3, 1995 (age 31) Tsukuba, Ibaraki Prefecture, Japan
- Height: 1.63 m (5 ft 4 in)
- Weight: 57 kg (126 lb; 9.0 st)

Cycling career
- Sport: Cycling
- Current team: Team UKYO
- Discipline: Road
- Role: Rider
- Rider type: Rouleur; Sprinter

Amateur teams
- 2013: C Project
- 2013: Cannondale–Champion System
- 2014–2015: EQA

Professional teams
- 2017–2019: Utsunomiya Blitzen
- 2020–2021: Nippo–Delko–One Provence
- 2021–2022: Nippo–Provence–PTS Conti
- 2023–2024: JCL Team UKYO
- 2025–: Astemo Utsunomiya Blitzen

Atsushi Oka (岡 篤志, Oka Atsushi; born 3 September 1995) is a Japanese professional cyclist, who currently rides for UCI Continental team Team UKYO.

== Career ==
After three years at Japanese UCI Continental team Utsunomiya Blitzen, Oka signed with French UCI ProTeam Nippo–Delko–One Provence in 2020, joining compatriots Fumiyuki Beppu, Masahiro Ishigami, and Hideto Nakane. Oka made his debut for the team at the 2020 La Tropicale Amissa Bongo.

At the end of the 2020 season, it was reported that Oka was one of several riders who filed complaints to the UCI about team manager Philippe Lannes trying to force them out of the team midway through their contracts and evict them out of the team house, amidst controversies over "missing payments, contracts not being honored, and threatening behavior" towards the riders' futures on the team. Speculation arose that Lannes' actions, especially towards Oka and Ishigami, partially stemmed from his frustrations over Japanese sponsor Nippo leaving the team, further contributing to the team's financial troubles; however, both riders remained registered with team for the 2021 season.

On 28 April 2021, Oka received a four-month suspension from the UCI after an anti-doping control test came back positive for acetazolamide, a drug banned by WADA that is often used to treat altitude sickness. Given the retroactive suspension from the date of the positive on 13 December 2020, Oka was eligible to race again on 24 May 2021.

On 29 June, Oka signed with Nippo–Provence–PTS Conti, joining Delko teammate Masahiro Ishigami, who had signed a month earlier.

== Personal life ==
Oka's older brother Yasumasa is also a professional cyclist.

== Major results ==
2013
1st Time trial, National Junior Road Championships
2nd Road race, National Junior Road Championships
2014
5th Time trial, National Road Championships
2015
7th Time trial, National Road Championships
2016
2nd Time trial, National Under–23 Road Championships
2017
4th Time trial, National Road Championships
6th Overall Tour de Tochigi
2018
4th Oita Urban Classic
9th Overall Tour de Tochigi
10th Tour de Okinawa
2019
1st Prologue Tour of Japan
2nd Time trial, National Road Championships
2nd Overall Tour de Kumano
4th Overall Tour de Tochigi
2021
National Road Championships

4th Time trial
5th Road race

2022
1st Stage 3 Tour of Japan
4th Umag Trophy
2023
1st Overall Tour de Kumano
National Road Championships

2nd Road race
4th Time trial

3rd Overall Tour of Japan

1st Stage 5

2024
1st Overall Tour de Kumano

1st Points classification

1st Active Rider classification, AlUla Tour
1st Stage 2 Tour of Japan
2025
1st Tour de Okinawa
1st Points classification Tour of Japan

1st Stage 2

3rd Overall Tour de Kumano
10th Oita Urban Classic
2026
6th Overall Tour de Kumano
