= Masahiro Yasuhara =

Japanese cyclist

Personal information
- Full name: Masahiro Yasuhara; Japanese: 安原 昌弘
- Born: 4 February 1963 (age 63) Osaka, Japan

Cycling career
- Sport: Cycling
- Current team: Matrix Powertag
- Discipline: Road
- Role: Rider (retired); Team manager; Directeur sportif

Professional teams
- 1991–1993: Japan Proroad Project
- 1994–1995: Inoac–Deki
- 1996: Japan Professional Cyclist Association
- 1997: Ezak

Managerial team
- 2006–: Matrix

Masahiro Yasuhara (安原 昌弘, Yasuhara Masahiro; born 4 February 1963) is a Japanese former cyclist. He competed in the men's points race event at the 1996 Summer Olympics. He is currently the manager of the UCI Continental team Matrix Powertag.
