= 2012 Chrono des Nations =

Race details
- Dates: 21 October 2012
- Stages: 1
- Distance: 48.5 km (30.14 mi)
- Winning time: 58' 07"

Results
	Winner	Tony Martin (GER)
	Second	Sylvain Chavanel (FRA)
	Third	Taylor Phinney (USA)

The 2012 Chrono des Nations was the 31st edition of the Chrono des Nations cycle race and was held on 21 October 2012. The race started and finished in Les Herbiers. The race was won by Tony Martin.

== General classification ==
Final general classification

Rank	Rider	Time
1	Tony Martin (GER)	58' 07"
2	Sylvain Chavanel (FRA)	+ 41"
3	Taylor Phinney (USA)	+ 42"
4	Jérémy Roy (FRA)	+ 1' 45"
5	László Bodrogi (HUN)	+ 3' 23"
6	Carlos Oyarzun (CHI)	+ 3' 35"
7	Manuele Boaro (ITA)	+ 3' 48"
8	Gustav Larsson (SWE)	+ 4' 04"
9	Loïc Desriac (FRA)	+ 4' 42"
10	Franck Vermeulen (FRA)	+ 4' 46"
