= Tour of Quanzhou Bay =

Cycling race in Quanzhou, China

Race details
- Date: November/December
- Region: Quanzhou, China
- Discipline: Road
- Competition: UCI Asia Tour
- Type: Stage race

History
- First edition: 2017
- Editions: 3 (as of 2019)
- First winner: Max Stedman (GBR)
- Most wins: Max Stedman (GBR) (2 wins)
- Most recent: Ryan Cavanagh (AUS)

Tour of Quanzhou Bay is a men's multi-day cycling race which takes place in China. It is rated as a 2.2 event on UCI Asia Tour.

== Overall winners ==
Year	Country	Rider	Team
2017	Great Britain	Max Stedman	Bike Channel–Canyon
2018	Great Britain	Max Stedman	Canyon Eisberg
2019	Australia	Ryan Cavanagh	St George Continental Cycling Team
