= 2012 Vuelta a Castilla y León =

Race details
- Dates: 13–15 April 2012
- Stages: 3
- Distance: 491.4 km (305.3 mi)
- Winning time: 12h 46' 05"

Results
| Jersey awarded to the overall winner | Winner | Javier Moreno (ESP) | (Movistar Team) |
| | Second | Guillaume Levarlet (FRA) | (Saur–Sojasun) |
| | Third | Pablo Urtasun (ESP) | (Euskaltel–Euskadi) |

The 2012 Vuelta a Castilla y León was the 27th edition of the Vuelta a Castilla y León cycle race and was held on 13 April to 15 April 2012. The race started in Salamanca and finished in Segovia. The race was won by Javier Moreno.

== General classification ==
Final general classification

| Rank | Rider | Time |
|---|---|---|
| 1 | Javier Moreno (ESP) | 12h 46' 05" |
| 2 | Guillaume Levarlet (FRA) | + 1" |
| 3 | Pablo Urtasun (ESP) | + 3" |
| 4 | David de la Cruz (ESP) | + 10" |
| 5 | Tiago Machado (POR) | + 19" |
| 6 | José Vicente Toribio (ESP) | + 30" |
| 7 | Jonathan Castroviejo (ESP) | + 1' 36" |
| 8 | Linus Gerdemann (GER) | + 1' 41" |
| 9 | Iván Velasco (ESP) | + 1' 50" |
| 10 | David Blanco (ESP) | + 3' 13" |
