= Peter Pouly =

French cyclist

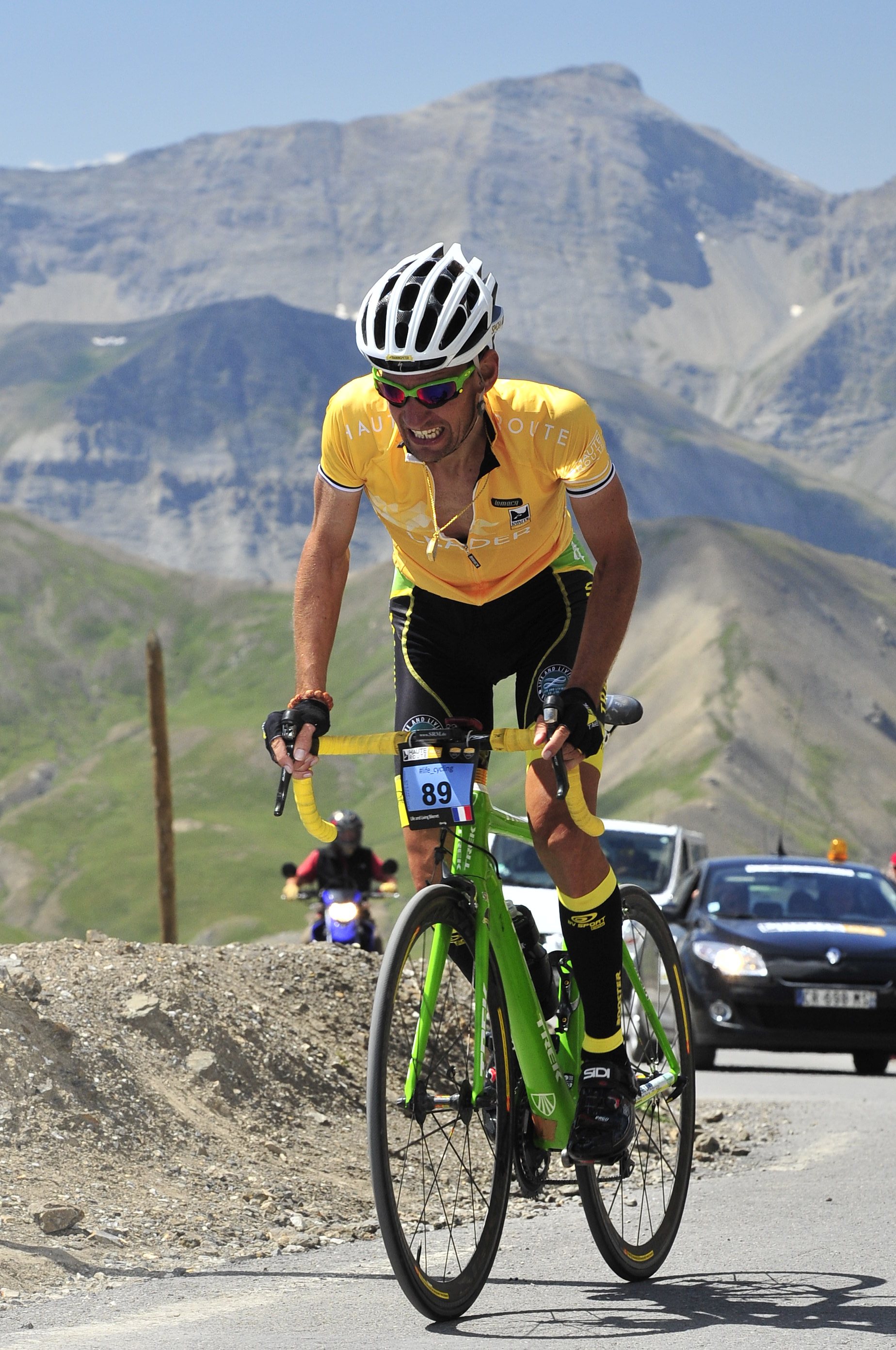
- Pouly in 2013

Personal information
- Full name: Peter Pouly
- Born: 29 June 1977 (age 49) Saint-Étienne, France

Cycling career
- Sport: Cycling
- Current team: Roojai Insurance Winspace
- Disciplines: Road; Mountain biking
- Role: Rider (retired); Directeur sportif

Amateur teams
- 2014–2015: Singha Infinite Cycling Team
- 2018–2019: Roojai.com Cycling Team

Professional teams
- 2015: Pishgaman–Giant
- 2016: Singha Infinite Cycling Team

Managerial team
- 2021–: Roojai.com Cycling Team

Peter Pouly (born 29 June 1977) is a French former professional cyclist, who competed professionally in road racing and mountain biking for Pishgaman–Giant and the Singha Infinite Cycling Team. He now works as a directeur sportif for UCI Continental team Roojai Insurance Winspace.

== Doping ban ==
Pouly served a suspension of one year from 12 December 2002 to 12 December 2003 for doping.

== Major results ==
1995
1st Cross-country, National Junior Mountain Bike Championships
1st Roc Laissagais
4th Cross-country, UCI Junior Mountain Bike World Championships
1998
1st Cross-country, National Under-23 Mountain Bike Championships
1999
1st Cross-country, National Under-23 Mountain Bike Championships
2001
3rd Roc d'Azur
2002
1st Roc d'Azur
1st GP Meyruels
2004
1st Marathon cross-country, National Mountain Bike Championships
2005
1st Marathon cross-country, National Mountain Bike Championships
2nd Roc d'Azur
2011
1st Overall Haute Route
2012
1st Overall Haute Route
1st Doi Inthanon
2nd Taiwan KOM Challenge
2013
1st Overall Haute Route
1st Doi Inthanon
3rd L'Étape du Tour
2014
1st Overall Haute Route
1st Overall Tour de Ijen

1st Mountains classification
1st Stage 3

1st La Marmotte
2nd L'Étape du Tour
2015
1st Overall Tour de Ijen

1st Mountains classification
1st Stage 3

1st Overall Haute Route
2016
9th Overall Sharjah International Cycling Tour
2017
2nd Overall Tour of Poyang Lake
2018
1st Doi Inthanon Challenge #11
