= Victoire Hiroshima =

Japanese cycling team

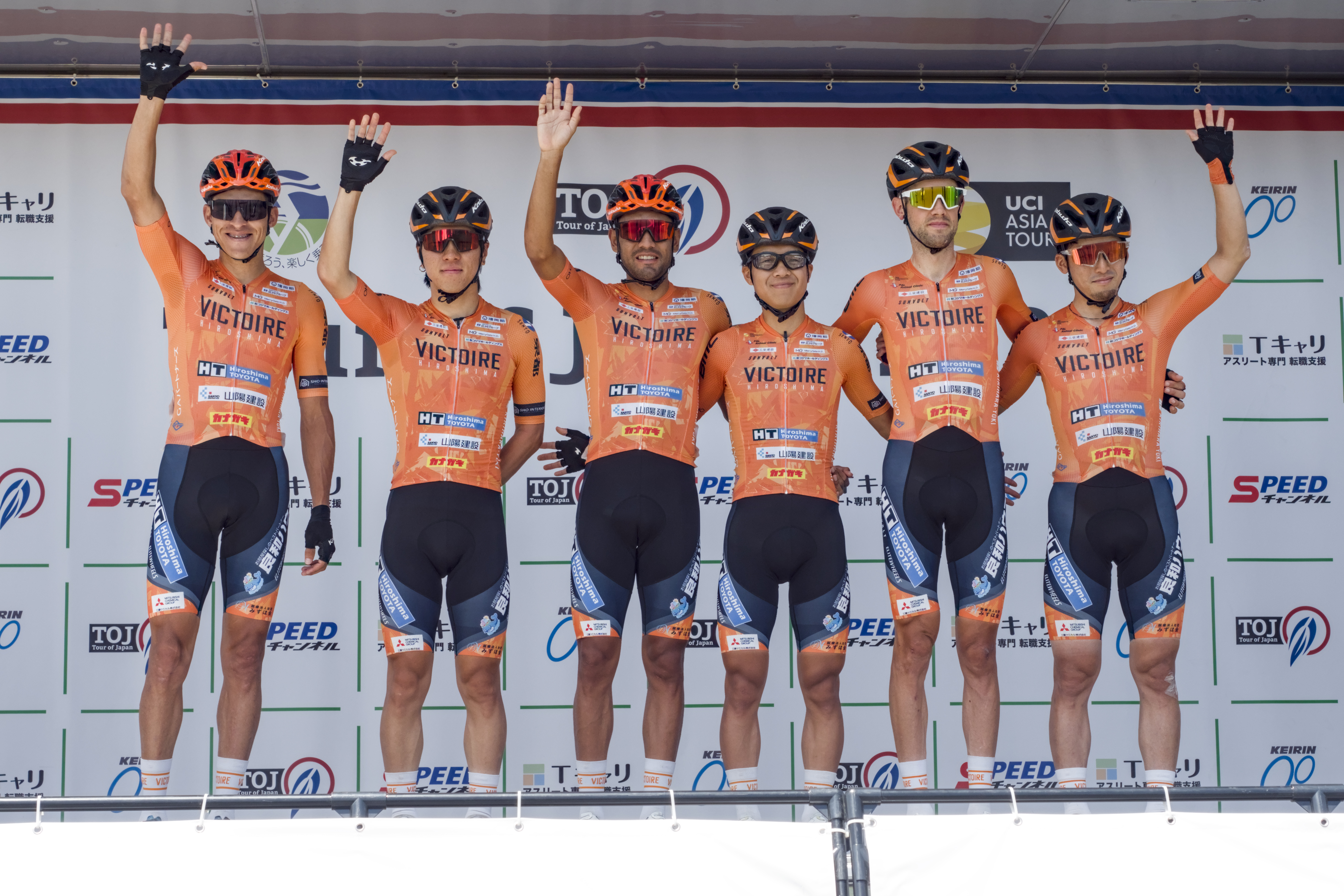
- Victoire Hiroshima before the start of stage 8 of Tour of Japan 2024.

Team information
- UCI code: VCH
- Registered: Japan
- Founded: 2015
- Discipline: Road
- Status: National (2015–2019); UCI Continental (2020); National (2021); UCI Continental (2022 – )
- Bicycles: BMC
- Website: Team home page

Key personnel
- General manager: Takashi Nakayama

Team name history
- 2015–: Victoire Hiroshima

Victoire Hiroshima (ヴィクトワール広島) is a Japanese UCI Continental cycling team established in 2015 as the first professional team in Chugoku and Shikoku. It gained UCI continental status in 2020.

== Team roster ==
As of 22 August 2024.

Rider	Date of birth
José Castillo (VEN)	2 February 1995 (age 31)
Ben Dyball (AUS)	20 April 1989 (age 37)
Yusuke Kubota (JPN)	28 February 1997 (age 29)
Kenta Miyazaki (JPN)	19 September 2000 (age 25)
Keisuke Nakamura (JPN)	25 September 1998 (age 27)
Takuya Nakata (JPN)	3 June 1996 (age 30)

Rider	Date of birth
Rei Onodera (JPN)	3 September 1995 (age 31)
Leonel Quintero (VEN)	13 March 1997 (age 29)
Masayuki Shibata (JPN)	3 November 1994 (age 31)
Kenshiro Yamaguchi (JPN)	23 June 2003 (age 23)
Tetsuro Yoshimoto (JPN)	19 September 1979 (age 46)

== Major results ==
2022
Stage 3 Tour de Kumano, Ryan Cavanagh
2023
Stage 3 Tour of Japan, Carter Bettles
2024
Grand Prix Kaisareia, Ben Dyball
2025
Oita Urban Classic, Elliot Schultz
2026
Overall Tour de Kumano, Luke Burns
Stage 2 Tour de Kumano, Luke Burns
