= St George Continental Cycling Team =

Australian cycling team

Team information
- UCI code: STG
- Registered: Australia
- Founded: 2015
- Discipline: Road
- Status: National (2015); UCI Continental (2016–)

Key personnel
- General manager: Stuart Boyce
- Team managers: Brett Dutton; Anthony Flynn; Michael Henderson; Dan Waluszewski

Team name history
- 2015–2016 2017–: St George Merida Cycling Team; St George Continental Cycling Team

The St George Continental Cycling Team is an Australian road cycling team, founded in 2015 at domestic level. In 2016 the team acquired a UCI Continental licence.

== Team roster ==
As of 24 February 2021.

Rider	Date of birth
Carter Bettles (AUS)	2 September 1998 (age 28)
Ryan Cavanagh (AUS)	22 November 1995 (age 30)
Sam Crome (AUS)	16 December 1993 (age 32)
Jay Dutton (AUS)	22 November 1993 (age 32)
Daniel Gandy (AUS)	3 October 2000 (age 25)

Rider	Date of birth
James Harvey (NZL)	12 May 1990 (age 36)
Dylan Kennett (NZL)	8 December 1994 (age 31)
Connor Reardon (AUS)	23 May 1999 (age 27)
Michael Vink (NZL)	22 November 1991 (age 34)
Matthew Zenovich (NZL)	26 February 1994 (age 32)

== Major results ==
2018
Overall Tour of Thailand, Benjamin Dyball

Mountains classification, Benjamin Dyball
Stage 3, Benjamin Dyball

Overall Tour de Siak, Matthew Zenovich

Stage 1, Matthew Zenovich
Stage 2, Benjamin Dyball

Overall Tour de Ijen, Benjamin Dyball

Stage 1, Marcus Culey
Stage 4, Benjamin Dyball

Prologue & Stage 4 Tour of Taihu Lake, Dylan Kennett
Stage 5 Tour de Singkarak, Ryan Cavanagh
Stage 7 Tour de Singkarak, Jay Dutton

2019
Overall The Princess Maha Chakri Sirindhorn's Cup, Ryan Cavanagh

Stage 3, Ryan Cavanagh

Young rider classification Tour de Kumano, Corbin Strong
Young rider classification Tour de Korea, Corbin Strong
Overall Tour of Taihu Lake, Dylan Kennett

Stage 3, Dylan Kennett

Overall Tour of Quanzhou Bay, Ryan Cavanagh

Points classification, Ryan Cavanagh

2020
Stage 5 New Zealand Cycle Classic, Dylan Kennett
Stage 2 Tour de Taiwan, Ryan Cavanagh

2022
Stage 3 New Zealand Cycle Classic, Nick Kergozou
