= Travis Samuel =

Canadian cyclist (born 1994)

Personal information
- Born: 18 October 1994 (age 31) Peterborough, Ontario, Canada
- Height: 6 ft 1 in (1.85 m)
- Weight: 165 lb (75 kg; 11.8 st)

Cycling career
- Sport: Cycling
- Discipline: Road
- Role: Rider
- Rider type: All-Rounder

Amateur team
- 2020: Toronto Hustle

Professional teams
- 2014: Start–Trigon Cycling Team (stagiaire)
- 2015–2017: H&R Block Pro Cycling
- 2018: Silber Pro Cycling Team
- 2019: DCBank Pro Cycling Team

Travis Samuel is a Canadian bicycle racer, who last rode for Canadian amateur team Toronto Hustle.

== Major results ==
2017
5th Overall Grand Prix Cycliste de Saguenay
9th Hong Kong Challenge
9th Overall Cascade Cycling Classic
10th Overall Tour of Taihu Lake
