= Chris Prendergast =

Canadian cyclist

Personal information
- Full name: Christopher Prendergast
- Born: 19 September 1994 (age 32) Winnipeg, Manitoba, Canada
- Height: 6 ft 1 in (1.85 m)
- Weight: 71 kg (157 lb; 11.2 st)

Cycling career
- Sport: Cycling
- Current team: CRCA–Jamison Capital–Cannondale
- Disciplines: Road; Track
- Role: Rider
- Rider type: Rouleur

Amateur teams
- 2013: UC Aubenas
- 2014: H&R Block
- 2015: Jet Fuel Coffee
- 2021–: CRCA–Jamison Capital–Cannondale

Professional team
- 2016–2017: H&R Block Pro Cycling

Chris Prendergast (born 19 September 1994) is a Canadian bicycle racer, who currently rides for Canadian amateur team CRCA–Jamison Capital–Cannondale.

== Major results ==
2012
1st Road race, National Junior Road Championships
2015
2nd Overall Killington Stage Race
2022
2nd Overall Killington Stage Race

1st Stage 1
