= Hong Kong Challenge =

Race details
- Date: October
- Region: Hong Kong
- Discipline: Road
- Competition: UCI Asia Tour
- Type: One-day race

History
- First edition: 2017
- Editions: 3 (as of 2026)
- First winner: Matej Mohorič (SLO)
- Most wins: No repeat winners
- Most recent: Paul Magnier (FRA)

The Hong Kong Challenge (officially known as the Sun Hung Kai Properties Hong Kong Challenge) is a one-day professional cycling race held annually in Hong Kong since 2017. It is part of UCI Asia Tour in category 1.1.

The race was replaced with Hammer Hong Kong in 2018, and returned in 2023 Hong Kong Cyclothon event.

== Winners ==
| Year | Country | Rider | Team |
|---|---|---|---|
| 2017 | Slovenia | Matej Mohorič | UAE Team Emirates |
| 2023 | Austria | Lukas Pöstlberger | Team Jayco–AlUla |
| 2026 | France | Paul Magnier | Soudal–Quick-Step |
