= Max Stedman =

British cyclist

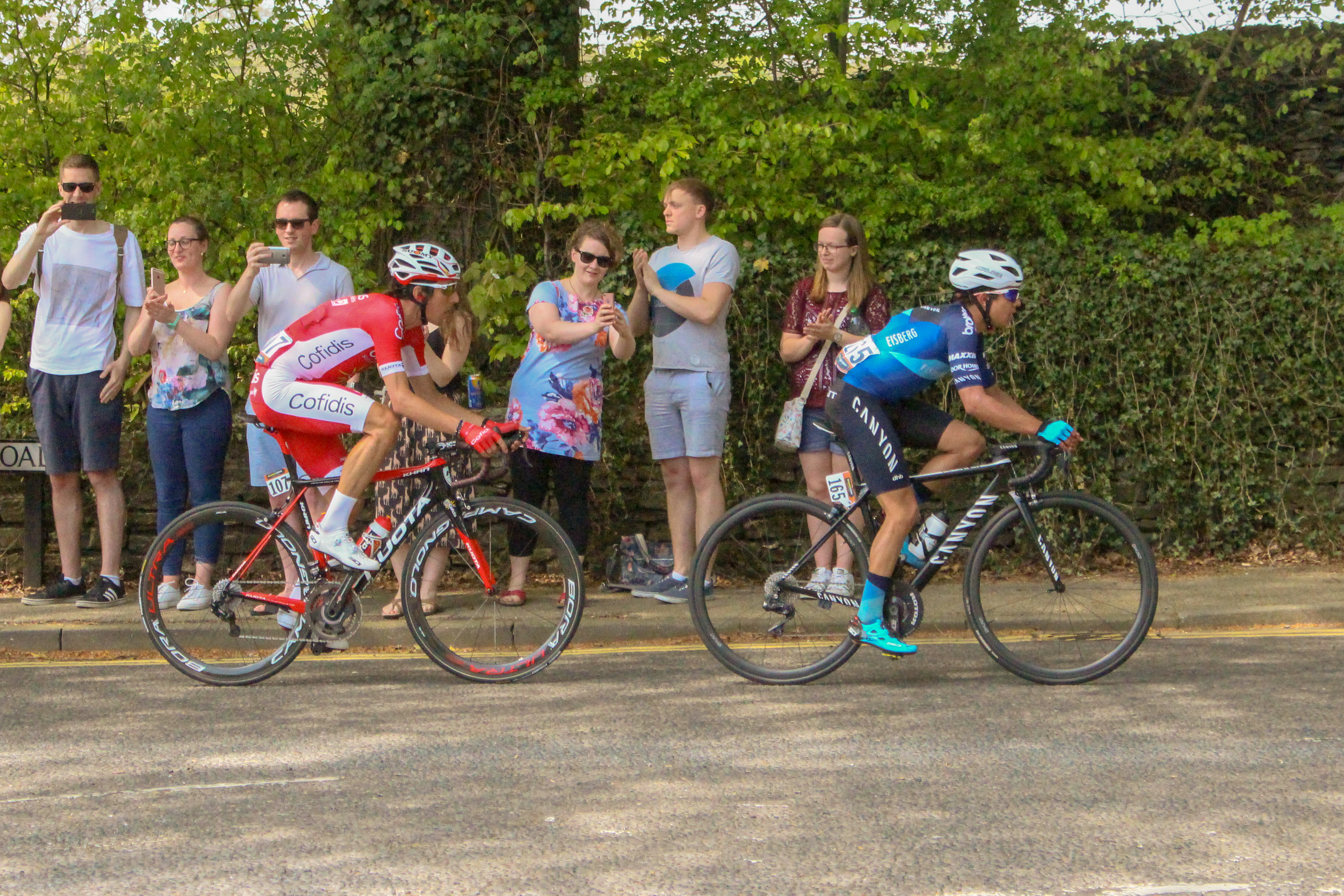
- Stedman (right) at the 2018 Tour de Yorkshire

Personal information
- Full name: Maximilian George Stedman
- Born: 22 March 1996 (age 30) Crowthorne, England
- Height: 1.67 m (5 ft 6 in)
- Weight: 54 kg (119 lb)

Cycling career
- Sport: Cycling
- Current team: Istanbul Büyükșehir Belediye Spor Türkiye
- Discipline: Road
- Role: Rider

Amateur team
- 2015: Pedal Heaven

Professional teams
- 2016: Pedal Heaven
- 2017–2021: Bike Channel–Canyon
- 2022: MG.K Vis Colors for Peace VPM
- 2023: AT85 Pro Cycling
- 2023–2024: Beykoz Belediyesi Spor Kulübü

Maximilian George Stedman (born 22 March 1996) is a retired British cyclist, who finished his career with UCI Continental team Istanbul Büyükșehir Belediye Spor Türkiye.

== Major results ==
2016
7th Velothon Wales
9th Overall Tour of Bulgaria
2017
1st Overall Tour of Quanzhou Bay

1st Stage 2

9th Beaumont Trophy
2018
1st Overall Tour of Quanzhou Bay

1st Mountains classification
1st Stage 2

2020
1st Overall Tour of Antalya
2022
8th GP Gorenjska
2023
1st Overall Tour of Albania

1st Stage 1

1st Overall Tour of Yigido

1st Prologue & Stage 2

1st Grand Prix Erciyes
1st Mountains classification, Tour of Istanbul
4th Overall Tour of The Republic
5th Overall Tour de Maurice

1st Stage 2 (TTT)

5th Grand Prix Kaisareia
6th Classique de l'île Maurice
9th Grand Prix Kültepe
2024
1st Grand Prix Altınkale
5th Overall Tour of Antalya
5th Grand Prix Syedra Ancient City
