= Robert Scott (cyclist) =

British cyclist

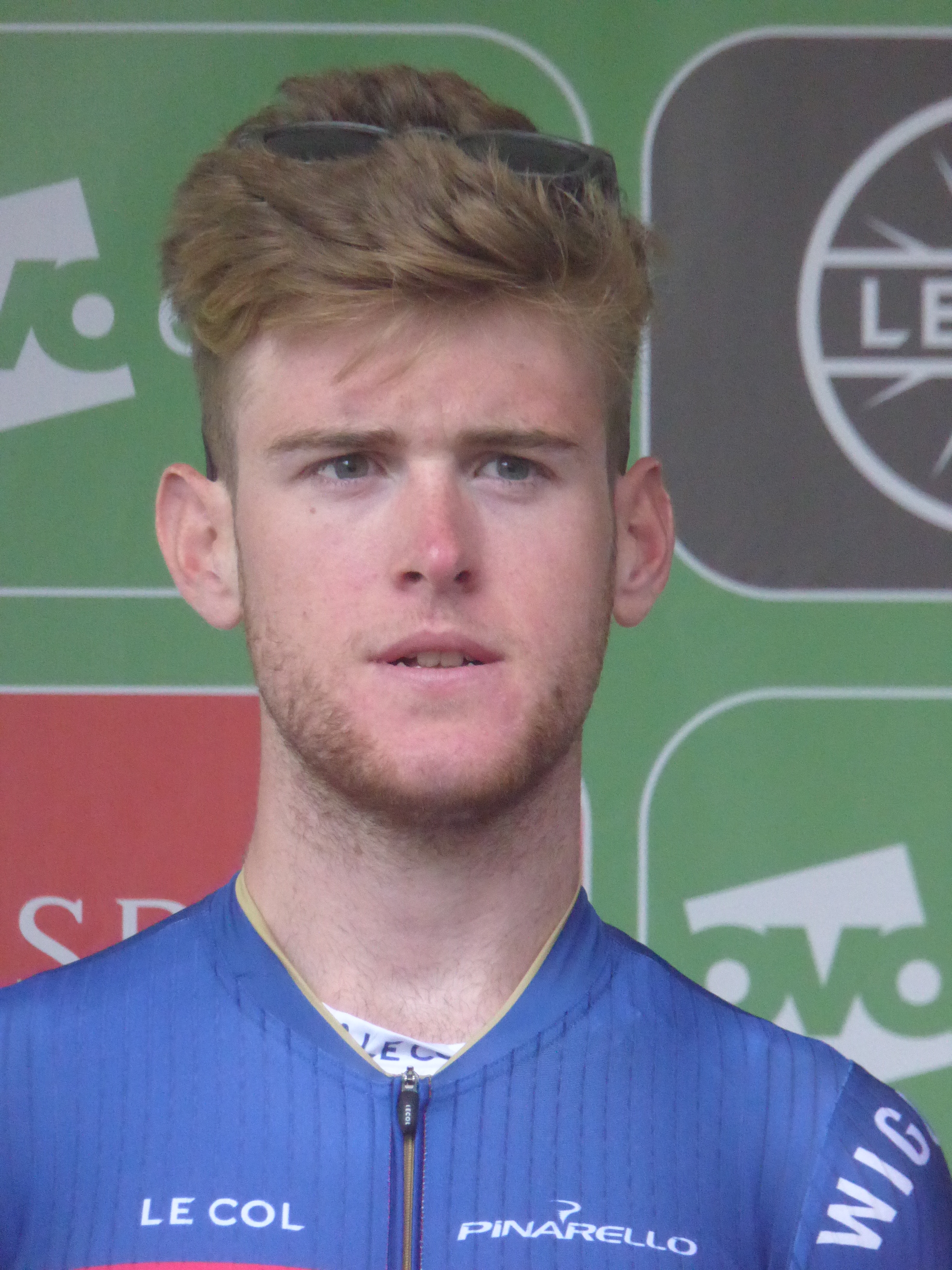

Personal information
- Full name: Robert Wentworth Scott
- Nicknames: The Chin Of Halifax, Syndrome
- Born: 24 July 1998 (age 28) Halifax, England
- Height: 181 cm (5 ft 11 in)

Cycling career
- Sport: Cycling
- Current team: AT85 Pro Cycling
- Discipline: Road
- Role: Rider

Amateur teams
- 2016: VCUK PH-Mas
- 2015: VCUK PH-Mas

Professional teams
- 2017–2019: WIGGINS
- 2020–: Canyon dhb p/b Soreen

Robert Wentworth Scott (born 24 July 1998) is a British cyclist, who currently rides for UCI Continental team AT85 Pro Cycling.

== Major results ==
2015
1st Stage 3 Junior Tour of Wales
2nd Road race, National Junior Road Championships
2016
Isle of Man Junior Tour

1st Stages 1 (ITT) & 3

1st Stage 1 (ITT) Junior Tour of Wales
2018
National Under-23 Road Championships

1st Road race
5th Time trial

4th Road race, National Road Championships
2019
4th Kattekoers
9th Overall Le Triptyque des Monts et Châteaux
2021
10th Ronde van de Achterhoek
2022
1st Overall Tour de la Mirabelle

1st Stage 3

1st Paris–Troyes
1st Overall National Road Series

1st Lancaster GP
1st Colne GP
2nd Overall Manx International

1st Stage 4

2nd Stockton GP

2023
1st Baardegem
1st Hulste
1st Lichtervelde
1st Gits
2nd Moortsele
2024
National Circuit Series

1st Guildford

1st Lister Horsfall Open Grand Prix
2nd Fort Vale Colne Grand Prix
2nd The Rayner Foundation Men's Otley Grand Prix
3rd Dudley Grand Prix
