= AT85 Pro Cycling =

British cycling team

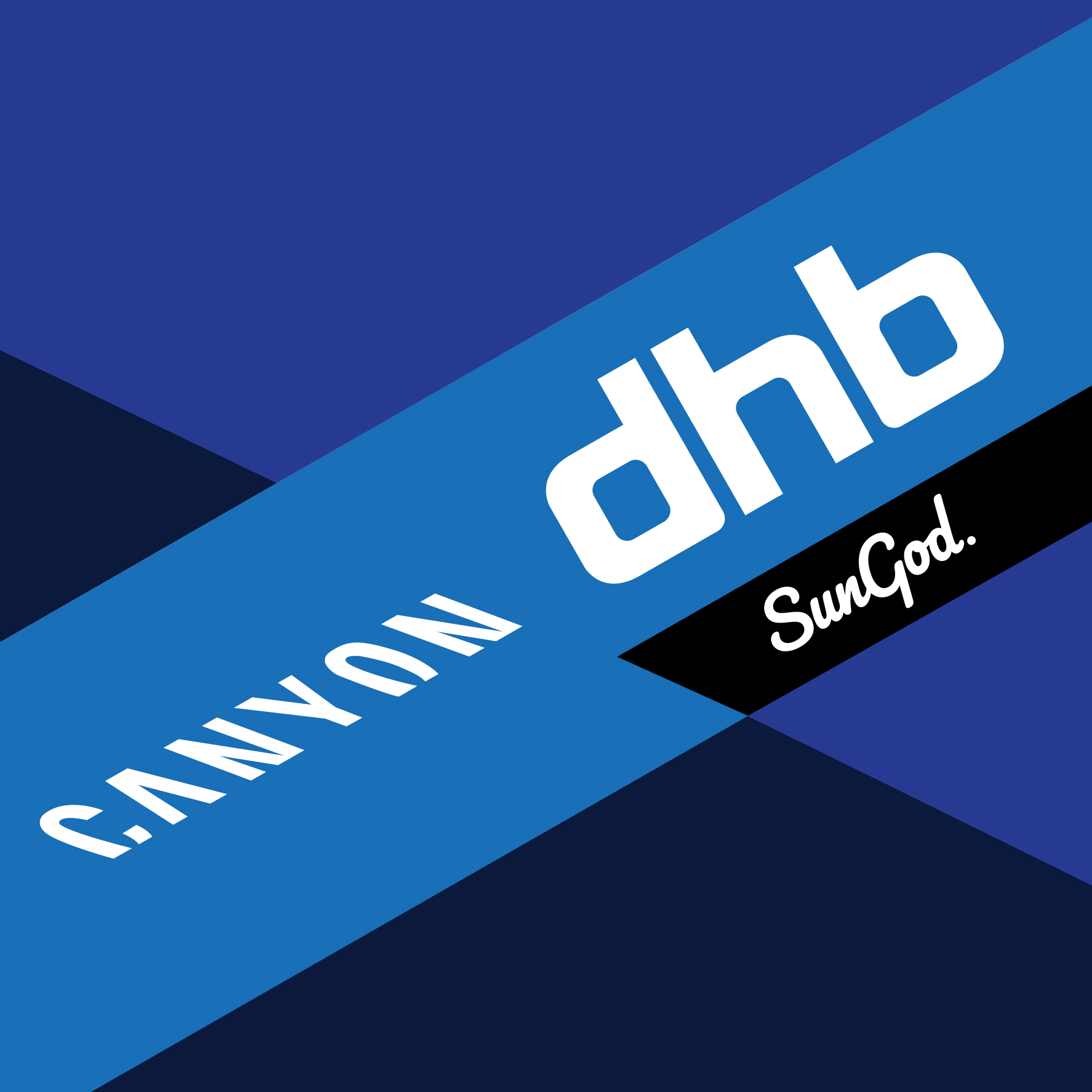

Team information
- UCI code: RDW
- Registered: United Kingdom
- Founded: 2017
- Disbanded: 2023
- Discipline: Road
- Status: UCI Continental
- Bicycles: Canyon
- Website: Team home page

Key personnel
- General manager: Tim Elverson

Team name history
- 2017 2018 2019 2020 2021 2022 2023: Bike Channel–Canyon; Canyon Eisberg; Canyon dhb p/b Bloor Homes; Canyon dhb p/b Soreen; Canyon dhb SunGod; WiV SunGod; AT85 Pro Cycling

AT85 Pro Cycling was a British UCI Continental cycling team founded in 2017 by sports director Tim Elverson. The team folded on 17 March 2023.

== Team history ==
The team formed as Bike Channel–Canyon in 2017. It recorded three wins during its inaugural season, all at the Tour of Quanzhou Bay. Stage 1 was won by Harry Tanfield, with Rory Townsend taking the lead in the minor classifications. Max Stedman won stage 2 of the race taking the lead on the Queen stage, he held the lead at the end of the following stage to win the race overall.

On 1 January 2018, the team announced that Eisberg had stepped up its sponsorship to allow the team to function after Bike Channel went into administration.

The team enjoyed two hugely successful seasons. Some of the highlights of their 2018 campaign include Harry Tanfield winning stage one of the Tour de Yorkshire, which led to him being signed by World Tour team Team Katusha–Alpecin. The team won the overall title in the Tour Series, the UK's premier circuit racing championship. Charlie Tanfield became a world champion in the UCI Track Cycling World Championships team pursuit and won a gold medal in the individual pursuit at the Commonwealth Games. He was also crowned British under-23-time trial champion on the road. Ryan Christensen, Max Stedman, and Charlie Tanfield were selected to race at the under-23 UCI Road World Championships in Austria, the latter in the time trial. At the Tour of Britain, the team recorded three top-10 stage finishes, Max Stedman was 20th in the general classification, and Alex Paton won the Eisberg sprints jersey.

2019 was another successful year for the team with multiple UK and European podiums. Some highlights included winning the Tour Series overall title for a second year running, a top 10 in the Tour de Yorkshire and the Tour of Britain, and the Eisberg sprints jersey at the Tour of Britain for the second time.

In December 2020, Elverson announced that the team had acquired sponsorship from British sunglasses maker 'SunGod' and that the team's name for the 2021 racing season would become Canyon DHB SunGod.

== Team roster ==
As of 14 July 2022.

| Rider | Date of birth |
|---|---|
| Toby Barnes (GBR) | 21 December 2001 (age 24) |
| Matthew Bostock (GBR) | 16 July 1997 (age 29) |
| Jim Brown (GBR) | 2 October 2000 (age 25) |
| Damien Clayton (GBR) | 30 July 1992 (age 34) |
| Matthew Gibson (GBR) | 2 September 1996 (age 30) |
| Gruffudd Lewis (GBR) | 11 November 1987 (age 38) |
| Euan Macleod (GBR) | 29 July 2002 (age 24) |
| Ben Perry (CAN) | 7 March 1994 (age 32) |

| Rider | Date of birth |
|---|---|
| Jacob Scott (GBR) | 14 June 1995 (age 31) |
| Robert Scott (GBR) | 24 July 1998 (age 28) |
| Matthew Teggart (IRE) | 8 January 1996 (age 30) |
| Rory Townsend (GBR) | 30 June 1995 (age 31) |
| Josh Whitehead (GBR) | 1 June 2000 (age 26) |
| Oliver Wood (GBR) | 26 November 1995 (age 30) |
| Reece Wood (GBR) | 28 May 1998 (age 28) |

== Major results ==
2017
Overall Tour of Quanzhou Bay, Max Stedman

Stage 1, Harry Tanfield
Stage 2, Max Stedman

2018
Stage 1 Tour de Yorkshire, Harry Tanfield
Overall Tour of Quanzhou Bay, Max Stedman

Stage 2, Max Stedman

Eisberg Sprints Jersey Winner Tour of Britain, Alex Paton

2019
Arno Wallaard Memorial, Alexandar Richardson
Stage 3 Tour de la Mirabelle, Daniel Pearson
Stage 4 Tour de la Mirabelle, Alexandar Richardson
Sprints classification Tour of Britain, Rory Townsend
Stages 2 & 4 Tour of Fuzhou, Rory Townsend

2020
Tour of Antalya, Max Stedman

2021
Stage 1 Tour de la Mirabelle, Rory Townsend

2022
Stage 1b Olympia's Tour, Matthew Gibson
Stage 4 Olympia's Tour, Jim Brown
Overall Tour de la Mirabelle, Robert Scott

Stage 3, Robert Scott
Stage 4, Matthew Bostock

Paris–Troyes, Robert Scott
Ireland National Road Race Championships, Rory Townsend

== National, continental, world, and Olympic champions ==
2018
British U23 Time Trial, Charlie Tanfield
Team pursuit, UCI Track World Championships Charlie Tanfield
Commonwealth Games

Individual pursuit Charlie Tanfield
