= Infinite AIS Cycling Team =

Thai cycling team

Team information
- UCI code: IAC
- Registered: Thailand
- Founded: 2014
- Discipline: Road
- Status: UCI Continental (2016–2017)
- Bicycles: Infinite
- Website: Team home page

Key personnel
- Team manager: Sébastien Duclos

Team name history
- 2014–2016 2017–: Singha Infinite Cycling Team; Infinite AIS Cycling Team

Infinite AIS Cycling Team (UCI team code: IAC) is a Thai road bicycle racing team. It was known in 2014 as Singha Infinite Cycling Team, Singha is a Thai Boon Rawd Brewery was the first of its kind in Thailand, and produces beer under the Singha brand name. Infinite is a Thai bicycle manufacturer. The team is a member of the UCI Continental cycling team.

== History ==
For the 2014 season the team rode Infinite bikes.

== Team roster ==
| Rider | Date of birth |
|---|---|
| Vincent Ang (SIN) | 5 May 1977 (age 49) |
| Leon Chan (SIN) | 20 November 1992 (age 33) |
| Kritsada Changpad (THA) | 5 April 1991 (age 35) |
| John Ebsen (DNK) | 15 November 1988 (age 37) |
| Konstantin Fast (RUS) | 28 August 1976 (age 50) |
| Wei Jie Lim (SIN) | 13 August 1996 (age 30) |

| Rider | Date of birth |
|---|---|
| Tay Chin Loong (SIN) | 24 September 1996 (age 29) |
| Hong De Low (SIN) | 11 September 1993 (age 32) |
| Khunakon Nonthichan (THA) | 6 January 1993 (age 33) |
| Peter Pouly (FRA) | 29 June 1977 (age 49) |
| Tanaphon Seanaumnuayphon (THA) | 23 September 1996 (age 29) |
| Ronald Yeung (HKG) | 30 July 1988 (age 38) |

== Major results ==
2014
Overall The Haute Route, Peter Pouly

Stages 1, 2 & 3, Peter Pouly

Overall Tour de Ijen, Peter Pouly

Stage 1, Kyosuke Takei
Stage 3, Peter Pouly

2015
Overall Tour de Ijen, Peter Pouly

Stage 3, Peter Pouly
