= JCL Team Ukyo =

Japanese cycling team

Team Ukyo
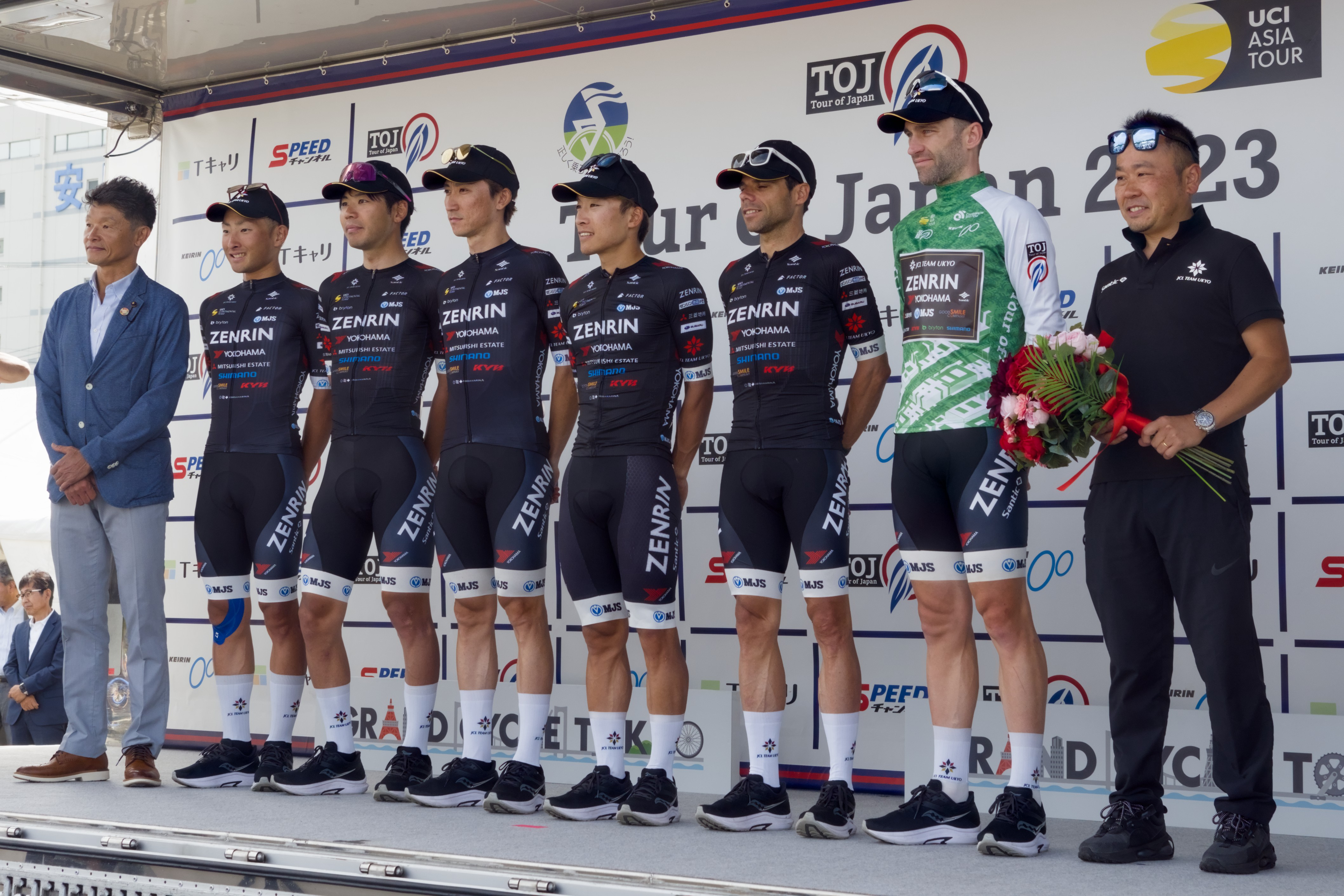
- The team at the 2023 Tour of Japan

Team information
- UCI code: TUK
- Registered: Japan
- Founded: 2012
- Discipline: Road
- Status: UCI Continental
- Bicycles: KUOTA

Key personnel
- General manager: Ukyo Katayama
- Team managers: Alberto Volpi; Manuele Boaro; Keita Onishi

Team name history
- 2012–2020 2021 2022 2023–2025 2025: Team Ukyo (UKO); Team Ukyo Sagamihara (UKO); Team Ukyo (UKO); JCL Team Ukyo (JCL); Team Ukyo (TUK)

Team Ukyo is a Japanese UCI Continental cycling team established in 2012. It is managed by the Japanese racing driver Ukyo Katayama.

== Team roster ==
As of 23 September 2026

| Rider | Date of birth |
|---|---|
| Nahom Zeray Araya (ERI) | 12 September 2002 (age 24) |
| Andrea D'Amato (ITA) | 14 November 2002 (age 23) |
| Tommaso Dati (ITA) | 13 July 2002 (age 24) |
| Nicolò Garibbo (ITA) | 29 June 1999 (age 27) |
| Federico Iacomoni (ITA) | 10 July 2002 (age 24) |
| Manabu Ishibashi (JPN) | 30 November 1992 (age 33) |
| Kazushige Kuboki (JPN) | 6 June 1989 (age 37) |

| Rider | Date of birth |
|---|---|
| Ren Mochizuki (JPN) | 13 August 2006 (age 20) |
| Simone Raccani (ITA) | 2 March 2001 (age 25) |
| Jin Soneda (JPN) | 21 January 2005 (age 21) |
| Yoshiki Terada (JPN) | 23 January 2002 (age 24) |
| Yato Watanabe (JPN) | 22 October 2003 (age 22) |
| Tetsuo Yamamoto (JPN) | 17 March 2000 (age 26) |

== Major wins ==
2013
Overall Tour of East Java, José Vicente Toribio

Stage 2, José Vicente Toribio

2015
Japan National Road Race Championships, Kazushige Kuboki
2016
Stage 2 Tour de Ijen, Benjamin Prades
Stage 5 Tour de Flores, Benjamin Prades
Overall Tour of Japan, Oscar Pujol

Stage 6 Oscar Pujol

Overall Tour de Kumano, Oscar Pujol

Stage 2 Oscar Pujol

Stage1 Tour de Hokkaido, Jon Aberasturi
2017
Overall Tour de Taiwan, Benjamin Prades
Stage 1 Tour de Tochigi, Salvador Guardiola
Stage 3 Tour de Tochigi, Egoitz Fernández
Stage 3 Tour of Thailand, Jon Aberasturi
Overall Tour de Lombok, Nathan Earle

Stages 1 & 2, Nathan Earle

Overall Tour of Japan, Oscar Pujol

Stage 4 Jon Aberasturi
Stage 6 Oscar Pujol

Stages 1 & 4 Tour de Korea, Jon Aberasturi
Japan National Road Race Championships, Yusuke Hatanaka
Stages 1 & 5 Tour of Qinghai Lake, Jon Aberasturi
2018
Stage 2 Tour de Taiwan, Robbie Hucker
Stage 3 Tour de Tochigi, Raymond Kreder
Stage 1 Tour of Thailand, Raymond Kreder
Stage 5 Tour de Korea, Raymond Kreder
Overall Tour de Kumano, Marc de Maar
2019
Overall Tour de Tochigi, Raymond Kreder

Stage 3 Raymond Kreder

Stage 4 Tour of Japan, Raymond Kreder
Stage 1 Tour de Korea, Raymond Kreder
Japan National U23 Road Race Championships, Kosuke Takeyama
Stage 3 Tour de Hokkaido, Raymond Kreder
Overall Tour de Ijen, Robbie Hucker
2022
Overall Tour de Taiwan, Ben Dyball

Stage 2 Ben Dyball
Stage 4 Raymond Kreder

Overall Tour of Japan, Nathan Earle

Stage 1 Nathan Earle
Stage 2 Ben Dyball
Stage 4 Raymond Kreder

Overall Tour de Kumano, Nathan Earle
Oita Urban Classic, Ryuki Uga
Stage 6 Tour of Thailand, Nathan Earle
Tour de Okinawa, Benjamín Prades
2023
Overall Tour of Japan, Nathan Earle

Stage 5, Atsushi Oka
Stage 6, Nathan Earle

Overall Tour de Kumano, Atsushi Oka

Stage 1, Masaki Yamamoto

Mine Akiyoshi-dai Karst International Road Race, Benjamín Prades
Tour de Okinawa, Masaki Yamamoto
2024
Points classification Tour de Taiwan, Matteo Malucelli
Overall Tour de Kumano, Atsushi Oka

Points classification, Atsushi Oka

Overall Tour of Japan, Giovanni Carboni

Stages 2 & 8, Matteo Malucelli
Stages 3 & 6, Giovanni Carboni

Overall Tour of Bulgaria, Matteo Malucelli

Stages 1, 3 & 5, Matteo Malucelli
Stage 2, Giovanni Carboni

Stage 1 Giro della Regione Friuli Venezia Giulia, Matteo Malucelli
Points classification Tour de Langkawi, Matteo Malucelli

Stages 2, 7 & 8, Matteo Malucelli
Best Asian rider classification, Manabu Ishibashi

2025
Overall Tour of Japan, Alessandro Fancellu

Stage 3, Alessandro Fancellu
Stage 5, Simone Raccani
Stage 6, Nahom Zeray

Milano-Rapallo, Alessandro Fancellu
Eritrea National Championships, Road Race, Nahom Zeray
Japan National Championships, Road Race, Marino Kobayashi
Stage 2 Tour de Gyeongnam, Simone Raccani
2026
Stage 1 Giro di Sardegna, Nicolò Garibbo
Stage 3 Settimana Internazionale di Coppi e Bartali, Tommaso Dati
Mountains classification Tour de Kumano, Nicolò Garibbo

Stage 3, Nicolò Garibbo

Stage 1 Tour of Japan, Tommaso Dati
Stage 2 Tour of Japan, Tommaso Dati
Stage 3 Tour of Japan, Nicolò Garibbo
Stage 5 Tour of Japan, Tommaso Dati
Overall Tour de Gyeongnam, Tommaso Dati

Stage 1, Simone Raccani

Overall Giro della Regione Friuli Venezia Giulia, Nicolò Garibbo

Stage 2, Nicolò Garibbo
Stage 3, Tommaso Dati

Overall Tour d'Arménie, Simone Raccani

Stage 2, Federico Iacomoni
