= Jure Rupnik =

Slovenian cyclist

Personal information
- Born: 28 October 1993 (age 32) Logatec, Slovenia
- Height: 6 ft 2 in (1.88 m)
- Weight: 172 lb (78 kg; 12.3 st)

Cycling career
- Sport: Cycling
- Discipline: Road
- Role: Rider
- Rider type: All-rounder

Amateur teams
- 2020–2021: Sables Vendée Cyclisme–Cube
- 2022: Bretagne Sud Cyclisme

Professional teams
- 2013: Radenska
- 2015–2019: H&R Block Pro Cycling

Jure Rupnik (born 28 October 1993) is a Slovenian road cyclist, who last rode for French amateur team Bretagne Sud Cyclisme.

== Major results ==
2017
1st Mountains classification, Grand Prix Cycliste de Saguenay
2018
6th Delta Road Race
