= EF Education–Nippo Development Team =

Swiss cycling team

Team information
- UCI code: EFD
- Registered: United States
- Founded: 2020
- Disbanded: 2023
- Discipline: Road
- Status: UCI Continental
- Bicycles: Cannondale

Key personnel
- General manager: Johan Petersson
- Team managers: Marcello Albasini; Guillaume Boshoff; Hiroshi Daimon

Team name history
- 2021 2022–: Nippo–Provence–PTS Conti; EF Education–Nippo Development Team

EF Education–Nippo Development Team was a UCI Continental cycling team registered in United States, as a development team of EF Education–EasyPost.

It was previously known as Nippo–Provence–PTS Conti, a Swiss UCI Continental team, founded in November 2020, that commenced racing from the 2021 season.

== Team roster ==
As of 6 July 2021.

Rider	Date of birth
Welay Berhe (ETH)	22 October 2001 (age 24)
Jonathan Bögli (SUI)	12 September 2000 (age 25)
Fabio Christen (SUI)	29 June 2002 (age 24)
Jonathan Couanon (FRA)	8 April 1997 (age 29)
Calvin Dik (GER)	25 February 2000 (age 26)
Masahiro Ishigami (JPN)	20 October 1997 (age 28)
Luca Jenni (SUI)	6 May 2002 (age 24)
Iver Knotten (NOR)	17 December 1998 (age 27)

Rider	Date of birth
Kevin Kuhn (SUI)	18 February 1998 (age 28)
Matvey Mamykin (RUS)	31 October 1994 (age 31)
Robin Meyer (FRA)	22 March 1996 (age 30)
Hijiri Oda (JPN)	23 November 1998 (age 27)
Atsushi Oka (JPN)	3 September 1995 (age 31)
Tesfu Redae (ETH)	5 December 2002 (age 23)
Szymon Tracz (POL)	12 November 1998 (age 27)

== Major wins ==
2022
Stage 3 Tour of Japan, Atsushi Oka
Japan Under-23 Time Trial Championships, Yuhi Todome
Overall Tour de Hokkaido, Yusuke Kadota
