= Masahiro Ishigami =

Japanese bicycle racer

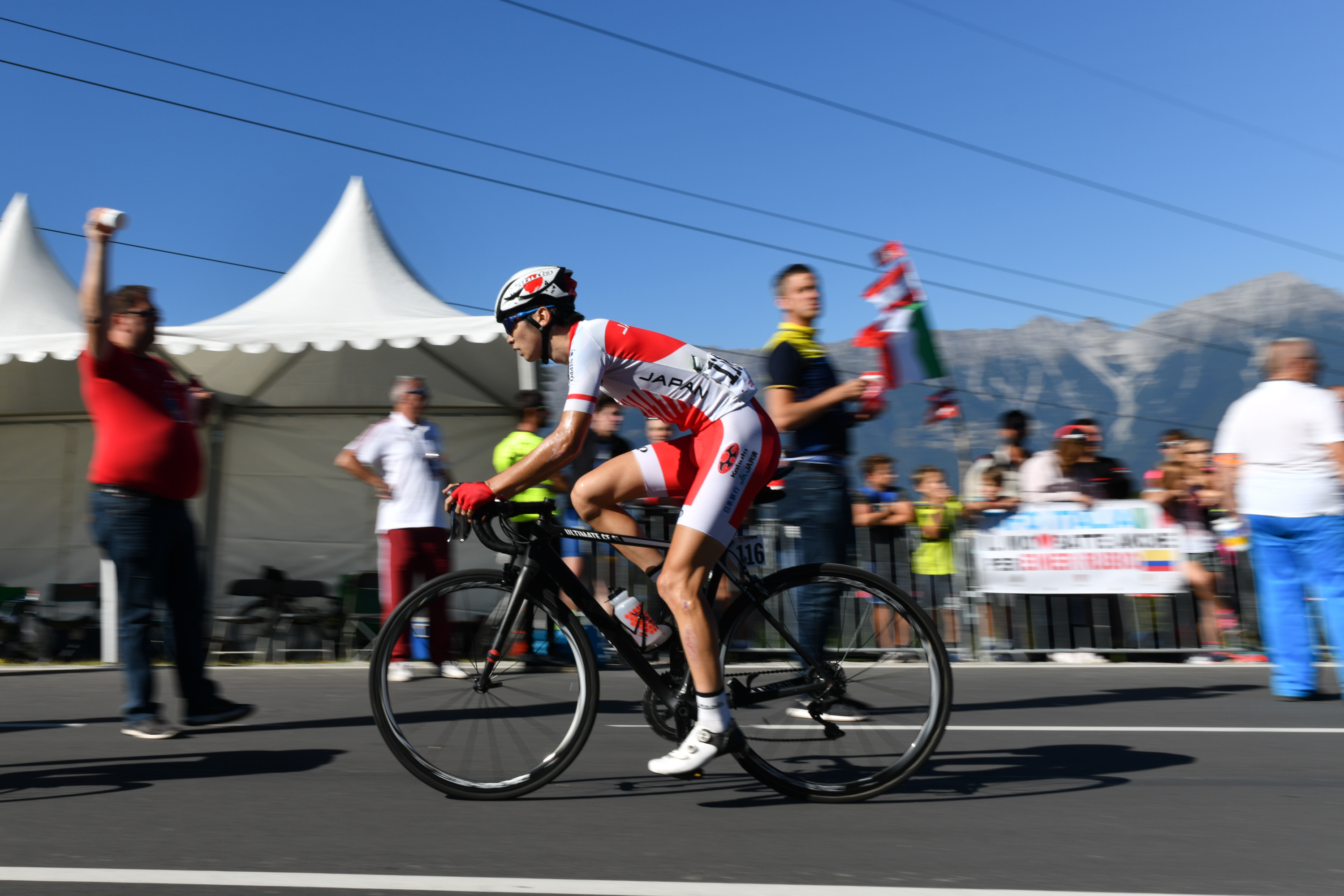
- Ishigami competing in the under–23 men's road race at the 2018 UCI Road World Championships

Personal information
- Born: October 20, 1997 (age 28) Yokohama, Japan
- Height: 1.76 m (5 ft 9 in)
- Weight: 58 kg (128 lb; 9.1 st)

Cycling career
- Sport: Cycling
- Current team: Aisan Racing Team
- Discipline: Road
- Role: Rider
- Rider type: Puncheur

Amateur teams
- 2011–2016: EQA U23
- 2017–2019: AVC Aix-en-Provence
- 2019: Delko–Marseille Provence (stagiaire)

Professional teams
- 2020: Nippo–Delko–One Provence
- 2021–2022: Nippo–Provence–PTS Conti
- 2023–: Aisan Racing Team

Masahiro Ishigami (石上優大, Ishigami Masahiro; born 20 October 1997) is a Japanese professional cyclist, who currently rides for UCI Continental team Aisan Racing Team.

After riding with the team as a stagiaire in 2019, Ishigami signed with French UCI ProTeam Nippo–Delko–One Provence in 2020, joining compatriots Fumiyuki Beppu, Atsushi Oka, and Hideto Nakane.

On 31 May 2021, Ishigami signed with Nippo–Provence–PTS Conti, and was later joined by Delko teammate Atsushi Oka, who signed a month earlier on 29 June.

== Major results ==
2014
7th Road race, Asian Junior Road Championships
2015
2nd Time trial, National Junior Road Championships
6th Time trial, Asian Junior Road Championships
2017
3rd Time trial, National Under–23 Road Championships
2018
1st Road race, National Under–23 Road Championships
1st Oita Urban Classic
4th Road race, Asian Under–23 Road Championships
2019
7th Prueba Villafranca-Ordiziako Klasika
2023
4th Road race, National Road Championships
6th Mine Akiyoshi-dai Karst International Road Race
8th Overall Tour de Kyushu
9th Overall Tour de Kumano
