= DCBank Pro Cycling Team =

H&R Block Pro Cycling
Team information
- UCI code: DCB
- Registered: Canada
- Founded: 2012
- Disbanded: 2019
- Discipline: Road
- Status: National (2012–2014); UCI Continental (2015–2019)
- Bicycles: Fuji

Team name history
- 2012–2014 2015–2018 2019: H&R Block; H&R Block Pro Cycling; DCBank Pro Cycling Team

The DCBank Pro Cycling Team was a Canadian UCI Continental cycling team established in 2012. Their stated goals are to specialize in U23 riders and develop talent. Norco, Axiom, and GS-6 are sponsors of the team. The team was not registered with the UCI in 2020. The five years the team was at the continental level, they did not achieve any UCI category victories.

== 2019 roster ==
Ages at 31 December 2019

Rider	Date of birth
Jake Cullen (CAN)	9 August 1996 (aged 23)
Gregory Daniel (USA)	8 November 1994 (aged 25)
Eder Frayre (MEX)	20 October 1991 (aged 28)
Marc-Antoine Nadon (CAN)	26 April 1994 (aged 25)
Joshua Kropf (CAN)	8 August 1996 (aged 23)
Antoine Leplingard (FRA)	23 March 1995 (aged 24)
Emiliano Mirafuentes (MEX)	27 December 1999 (aged 20)

Rider	Date of birth
Eugenio Mirafuentes (MEX)	27 December 1999 (aged 20)
Marko Pavlič (SLO)	9 February 1993 (aged 26)
Jure Rupnik (SLO)	28 October 1993 (aged 26)
Travis Samuel (CAN)	18 October 1994 (aged 25)
Thomas Schellenberg (CAN)	8 August 2000 (aged 19)
Jean-Denis Thibault (CAN)	11 July 1998 (aged 21)
Matt Zimmer (USA)	24 April 1993 (aged 26)
