= Tour de Siak =

Race details
- Date: September
- Region: Siak Regency
- Discipline: Road
- Competition: UCI Asia Tour
- Type: Stage race

History
- First edition: 2013
- Editions: 8 (as of 2024)
- First winner: Ryan Ariehan (INA)
- Most wins: No repeat winners
- Most recent: Jack Drage (NZL)

The Tour de Siak is a multi-day cycling race held annually in the Siak Regency of Indonesia. It has been part of UCI Asia Tour in category 2.2 since 2018.

This championship is organized by the Siak Regency Government through the Department of Tourism. First held in 2013, the Tour de Siak aims to promote tourism and culture in Siak, which is renowned for the heritage of the Sultanate of Siak Sri Indrapura.

== Winners ==
Year	Country	Rider	Team
2013	Indonesia	Ryan Ariehan	
2014	Iran	Hossein Jahabanian	Tabriz Shahrdari Ranking
2015	Malaysia	Nik Mohamad Azman Zulkifli	
2016	Vietnam	Duc Tam Trinh	
2017	Indonesia	Aiman Cahyadi	
2018	New Zealand	Matthew Zenovich	St George Continental Cycling Team
2019	Malaysia	Nur Amirul Fakhruddin Mazuki	Terengganu Inc. TSG
2020–23	No race		
2024	New Zealand	Jack Drage	Garuda Development
