= Tour de Ijen =

Indonesian multi-day road cycling race

Race details
- Date: December (2012); November (2013); October (2014); May (2015–2016); September (2017–2019)
- Region: Indonesia
- Discipline: Road
- Type: Stage race
- Web site: tourdeijen.com

History
- First edition: 2012
- Editions: 10 (as of 2025)
- First winner: Ki Ho Choi (HKG)
- Most wins: Peter Pouly (FRA) (2 wins)
- Most recent: Benjamín Prades (ESP)

Tour de Ijen, officially known as the International Tour de Banyuwangi Ijen, is a men's cycle race which takes place in Indonesia. Initiated as a stage race in 2012, the Tour de Ijen is rated by the UCI as a 2.2 race, and forms part of the UCI Asia Tour.

== Overall winners ==
Year	Country	Rider	Team
2012	Hong Kong	Choi Ki Ho	Hong Kong (national team)
2013	Iran	Samad Pourseyedi	Tabriz Petrochemical Team
2014	France	Peter Pouly	Singha Infinite Cycling Team
2015	France	Peter Pouly	Singha Infinite Cycling Team
2016	Australia	Jai Crawford	Kinan Cycling Team
2017	Italy	Davide Rebellin	Kuwait–Cartucho.es
2018	Australia	Ben Dyball	St George Continental Cycling Team
2019	Australia	Robbie Hucker	Team Ukyo
2020– 2023	No race		
2024	Eritrea	Merhawi Kudus	Terengganu Polygon Cycling Team
2025	Spain	Benjamín Prades	VC Fukuoka
