= Tour de Tochigi =

Japanese cycling race

Race details
- Date: March/April
- Region: Tochigi Prefecture, Japan
- Local name(s): ツール・ド・とちぎ (in Japanese)
- Discipline: Road
- Competition: UCI Asia Tour
- Type: Stage race
- Web site: www.tourdetochigi.com

History
- First edition: 2017
- Editions: 3 (as of 2019)
- Final edition: 2019
- First winner: Ben Hill (AUS)
- Most wins: No repeat winners
- Final winner: Raymond Kreder (NLD)

The Tour de Tochigi is a road cycling race held annually since 2017. It is part of UCI Asia Tour in category 2.2.

== Winners ==
Year	Country	Rider	Team
2017	Australia	Ben Hill	Attaque Team Gusto
2018	Australia	Michael Potter	ACA–Ride Sunshine Coast
2019	Netherlands	Raymond Kreder	Team Ukyo
2020	No race due to COVID-19 pandemic		
