= Tour de Kumano =

Japanese multi-day road cycling race

Race details
- Date: May
- Region: Shingū, Kumano, and Taiji, Japan
- Local name: ツール・ド・熊野
- Discipline: Road
- Competition: UCI Asia Tour 2.2
- Type: Stage race
- Web site: www.tourdekumano.jp

History
- First edition: 2006
- Editions: 19 (as of 2025)
- First winner: Tomoya Kano (JPN)
- Most wins: Fortunato Baliani (ITA); Atsushi Oka (JPN) (2 wins)
- Most recent: Luke Burns (AUS)

The Tour de Kumano (ツール・ド・熊野, Tsūru do Kumano) is an annual professional road bicycle racing stage race held in Mie Prefecture, Japan, named after Kumano. It was first run in 2006 at the amateur level, and moved to the professional level in 2008, when included into the UCI Asia Tour and classified as a 2.2 category race.

== Past winners ==
Year	Country	Rider	Team
2006	Japan	Tomoya Kano	
2007	Japan	Kazuhiro Mori	Aisan Racing Team
2008	Japan	Miyataka Shimizu	Meitan Hompo-GDR
2009	Kazakhstan	Valentin Iglinsky	Kazakhstan national team
2010	Kazakhstan	Andrey Mizurov	Tabriz Petrochemical Team
2011	Italy	Fortunato Baliani	D'Angelo & Antenucci–Nippo
2012	Italy	Fortunato Baliani	Team Nippo
2013	Colombia	Julián Arredondo	Team Nippo–De Rosa
2014	Spain	Francisco Mancebo	Skydive Dubai Pro Cycling
2015	Spain	Benjamín Prades	Matrix Powertag
2016	Spain	Óscar Pujol	Team Ukyo
2017	Spain	José Vicente Toribio	Matrix Powertag
2018	Netherlands	Marc de Maar	Team Ukyo
2019	Venezuela	Orluis Aular	Matrix Powertag
2020– 2021	No race due to the COVID-19 pandemic in Japan		
2022	Australia	Nathan Earle	Team Ukyo
2023	Japan	Atsushi Oka	JCL Team Ukyo
2024	Japan	Atsushi Oka	JCL Team Ukyo
2025	Great Britain	Mark Stewart	Team Solution Tech–Vini Fantini
2026	Australia	Luke Burns	Victoire Hiroshima
