= Oita Urban Classic =

Road cycling race on Kyushu Island, Japan

Race details
- Region: Ōita, Japan
- Local name: おおいたアーバンクラシック (in Japanese)
- Discipline: Road
- Competition: UCI Asia Tour
- Type: One-day
- Organiser: Oita City / Oita Cycle Fes Organizing Committee / Oita Sports Management
- Race director: Takaaki Yamasaki
- Web site: www.oita-cyclefes.com

History
- First edition: 2018
- Editions: 8 (as of 2026)
- First winner: Masahiro Ishigami (JPN)
- Most wins: No repeat winners
- Most recent: Eduardo Sepúlveda (ARG)

The Oita Urban Classic Road Race is a one-day road cycling race held on the street circuit around the Oita Stadium on Kyushu Island, Japan. It is sanctioned by UCI as a category 1.2 race of UCI Asia Tour since 2018.

The Oita Urban Classic Criterium (formerly Oita Ikoinomichi Criterium) is held on the day before the Oita Urban Classic Road Race.

The race began in 2014 as a JBCF race Oita Cycle Road Race, and it evolved to the UCI-sanctioned race in 2018. In the 2018 season, it was held in October. In the 2019 season, it was held in August to avoid conflict with the 2019 Rugby World Cup which uses Oita Stadium. Due to the COVID-19 pandemic, the UCI race of the 2020 event was canceled, and the JBCF race was held instead.

== Winners ==
| Year | Country | Rider | Team |
|---|---|---|---|
| 2018 | Japan | Masahiro Ishigami | Japan national team |
| 2019 | Australia | Drew Morey | Terengganu Inc. TSG |
| 2020 | No race | | |
| 2021 | Spain | Francisco Mancebo | Matrix Powertag |
| 2022 | Japan | Ryuki Uga | Team UKYO |
| 2023 | Australia | Ryan Cavanagh | Kinan Racing Team |
| 2024 | Netherlands | Jeroen Meijers | Victoria Sports Pro Cycling Team |
| 2025 | Australia | Elliot Schultz | Victoire Hiroshima |
| 2026 | Argentina | Eduardo Sepúlveda | Li-Ning Star |
