= 2010–11 UCI Asia Tour =

Biking Competition

- Seventh edition of the UCI Asia Tour

Details
- Dates: 10 October 2010–30 September 2011
- Location: Asia
- Races: 34

Champions
- Individual champion: Mehdi Sohrabi (IRI) (Tabriz Petrochemical Team)
- Teams' champion: Tabriz Petrochemical Team
- Nations' champion: Iran

The 2010–11 UCI Asia Tour was the 7th season of the UCI Asia Tour. The season began on 10 October 2010 with the Kumamoto International Road Race and ended on 30 September 2011 with the Golan II.

The points leader, based on the cumulative results of previous races, wears the UCI Asia Tour cycling jersey. Mehdi Sohrabi from Iran was the defending champion of the 2009–10 UCI Asia Tour and was crowned as the 2010–11 UCI Asia Tour champion.

Throughout the season, points are awarded to the top finishers of stages within stage races and the final general classification standings of each of the stages races and one-day events. The quality and complexity of a race also determines how many points are awarded to the top finishers, the higher the UCI rating of a race, the more points are awarded.

The UCI ratings from highest to lowest are as follows:

- Multi-day events: 2.HC, 2.1 and 2.2
- One-day events: 1.HC, 1.1 and 1.2

== Events ==
=== 2010 ===
Date	Race Name	Location	UCI Rating	Winner	Team
10 October	Kumamoto International Road Race	Japan	1.2	Takashi Miyazawa (JPN)	CDC–Cavaliere
11–19 October	Tour of Hainan	China	2.HC	Valentin Iglinsky (KAZ)	Astana
22–24 October	Tour de Seoul	South Korea	2.2	Tomasz Marczynski (POL)	CCC–Polsat–Polkowice
23 October	Tour of Taihu Lake	China	1.2	David Kemp (AUS)	Fly V Australia
24 October	Japan Cup	Japan	1.HC	Dan Martin (IRL)	Garmin–Transitions
24 October–3 November	Tour d'Indonesia	Indonesia	2.2	Herwin Jaya (INA)	Polygon Sweet Nice
13–14 November	Tour de Okinawa	Japan	2.2	Shinichi Fukushima (JPN)	Geumsan Ginseng Asia
12 December	Tour of South China Sea	China; Hong Kong; Macau	1.2	Kazuhiro Mori (JPN)	Aisan Racing Team

=== 2011 ===
Date	Race Name	Location	UCI Rating	Winner	Team
23 January–1 February	Tour de Langkawi	Malaysia	2.HC	Jonathan Monsalve (VEN)	Androni Giocattoli
6–11 February	Tour of Qatar	Qatar	2.1	Mark Renshaw (AUS)	HTC–Highroad
11 February	Mumbai Cyclothon I	India	1.1	Elia Viviani (ITA)	Liquigas–Cannondale
13 February	Mumbai Cyclothon II	India	1.1	Robert Hunter (RSA)	Team RadioShack
15–20 February	Tour of Oman	Oman	2.1	Robert Gesink (NED)	Rabobank
17 February	Asian Cycling Championships – Time trial	Thailand	CC	Evgeny Vakker (KGZ)	Kyrgyzstan (national team)
19 February	Asian Cycling Championships – Road race	Thailand	CC	Yukiya Arashiro (JPN)	Japan (national team)
24–28 February	Kerman Tour	Iran	2.2	Mehdi Sohrabi (IRI)	Tabriz Petrochemical Team
8–13 March	Jelajah Malaysia	Malaysia	2.2	Mehdi Sohrabi (IRI)	Tabriz Petrochemical Team
19–28 March	Tour de Taiwan	Taiwan	2.2	Markus Eibegger (AUT)	Tabriz Petrochemical Team
1–6 April	Tour of Thailand	Thailand	2.2	Tobias Erler (GER)	Tabriz Petrochemical Team
15–24 April	Tour de Korea	South Korea	2.2	Choi Ki Ho (HKG)	Hong Kong (national team)
16–19 April	Le Tour de Filipinas	Philippines	2.2	Rahim Ememi (IRI)	Azad University Iran
24 April	Melaka Governor Cup	Malaysia	1.2	Hassan Maleki (IRI)	Suren Cycling Team
13–18 May	Azerbaïjan Tour	Iran	2.2	Mehdi Sohrabi (IRI)	Tabriz Petrochemical Team
25–29 May	International Presidency Tour	Iran	2.2	Samad Pourseyedi (IRI)	Azad University Iran
26–29 May	Tour de Kumano	Japan	2.2	Fortunato Baliani (ITA)	D'Angelo & Antenucci–Nippo
6–12 June	Tour de Singkarak	Indonesia	2.2	Amir Zargari (IRI)	Azad University Iran
1–10 July	Tour of Qinghai Lake	China	2.HC	Gregor Gazvoda (SLO)	Perutnina Ptuj
1–5 September	Tour of Milad du Nour	Iran	2.2	Ghader Mizbani (IRI)	Tabriz Petrochemical Team
7–11 September	Tour de Brunei	Brunei	2.2	Shinichi Fukushima (JPN)	Terengganu Cycling Team
10–20 September	Tour of China	China	2.1	Muradjan Khalmuratov (UZB)	Giant Kenda Cycling Team
16–19 September	Tour de Hokkaido	Japan	2.2	Miguel Ángel Rubiano (COL)	D'Angelo & Antenucci–Nippo
24–25 September	Tour de East Java	Indonesia	2.2	Hossein Jahanbanian (IRI)	Tabriz Petrochemical Team
28 September	Golan I	Syria	1.2	Vladimir Tuychiev (UZB)	Uzbekistan (national team)
30 September	Golan II	Syria	1.2	Fadi Shekhoni (SYR)	Syria (national team)

== Final standings ==
=== Individual classification ===
Rank	Name	Team	Points
1.	Mehdi Sohrabi (IRI)	Tabriz Petrochemical Team	327
2.	Muradjan Khalmuratov (UZB)	Giant Kenda Cycling Team	239
3.	Amir Zargari (IRI)	Azad University Iran	218
4.	Libardo Niño (COL)	LeTua Cycling Team	208
5.	Boris Shpilevsky (RUS)	Tabriz Petrochemical Team	203
6.	Gregor Gazvoda (SLO)	Perutnina Ptuj	183
7.	Yukiya Arashiro (JPN)	Team Europcar	172
8.	Andrea Guardini (ITA)	Farnese Vini–Neri Sottoli	167
9.	Hossein Askari (IRI)	Tabriz Petrochemical Team	153
10.	Rahim Ememi (IRI)	Azad University Iran	149

=== Team classification ===
Rank	Team	Points
1.	Tabriz Petrochemical Team	1183
2.	Azad University Iran	663
3.	Giant Kenda Cycling Team	594.67
4.	Terengganu Cycling Team	371
5.	Farnese Vini–Neri Sottoli	340
6.	Aisan Racing Team	302
7.	LeTua Cycling Team	292
8.	CCC–Polsat–Polkowice	272
9.	Perutnina Ptuj	267
10.	D'Angelo & Antenucci–Nippo	266

=== Nation classification ===
Rank	Nation	Points
1.	Iran	1436
2.	Japan	1012
3.	Uzbekistan	449
4.	Malaysia	374
5.	Kazakhstan	348
6.	South Korea	287
7.	Syria	210
8.	Indonesia	206.34
9.	Hong Kong	200
10.	Kyrgyzstan	160

=== Nation under-23 classification ===
Rank	Nation under-23	Points
1.	Malaysia	169
2.	South Korea	152
3.	Kazakhstan	123
4.	Hong Kong	100
5.	Mongolia	81
6.	China	48
7.	Iran	35
8.	Japan	33
9.	Thailand	26
10.	Indonesia	22
