= Shinri Suzuki =

Japanese cyclist

Personal information
- Full name: Shinri Suzuki; Japanese: 鈴木 真理
- Born: December 25, 1974 (age 51) Japan
- Height: 170 cm (5 ft 7 in)

Cycling career
- Sport: Cycling
- Current team: Retired
- Discipline: Road
- Role: Rider

Professional teams
- 1996–1998: Bridgestone Anchor
- 1999–2004: Shimano Racing
- 2005: Bridgestone Anchor
- 2006–2007: Miyata
- 2008: Skil–Shimano
- 2009–2011: Shimano Racing Team
- 2012: Cannondale Spacezeropoint
- 2013–2017: Utsunomiya Blitzen

Shinri Suzuki (鈴木 真理, Suzuki Shinri; born 25 December 1974) is a Japanese former professional racing cyclist.

== Career ==
Suzuki was born in Kanagawa Prefecture. He turned professional after graduating from Hiratsuka Gakuen High School and has ridden for such teams as Bridgestone Anchor, Skil–Shimano, and Shimano Racing Team. He won the national championship in 2002, the Asian championship in 2003 and 2004, and represented Japan in the 2004 Summer Olympics. In 2012 he rode for a new team, Cannondale Spacepointzero, where he served as both team captain and a coach. From 2013 to 2017, he rode for Utsunomiya Blitzen.

== Major results ==
2001
1st Stage 7 Tour de Korea
1st Stage 6 Tour de Hokkaido
3rd Tour de Okinawa
2002
1st Road race, National Road Championships
1st Stage 3 Tour de Hokkaido
4th Tour de Okinawa
7th Overall Tour of Japan

1st Stage 6

2003
1st Road race, Asian Cycling Championships
1st Stage 7 Vuelta a las Americas
2004
1st Road race, Asian Cycling Championships
2nd Road race, National Road Championships
6th Overall Tour of Japan

1st Stage 5

2005
9th Japan Cup
2006
1st Points classification Tour of Japan
2nd Overall Tour de Hokkaido
3rd Road race, National Road Championships
2008
1st Stage 1 Tour de Korea
10th Overall Tour de Hokkaido
2009
1st Stage 4 Tour de Taiwan
2nd Overall Tour de Kumano
2nd Overall Tour de Hokkaido

1st Stage 6

4th Kumamoto International Road Race
5th Overall Tour de Okinawa
9th Japan Cup
2010
1st Stage 4 Tour of Japan
2nd Road race, National Road Championships
3rd Kumamoto International Road Race
5th Japan Cup
2011
9th Ronde van Noord-Holland
2012
9th Overall Tour de Kumano
2014
4th Tour de Okinawa
9th Overall Tour de Hokkaido
