= Hayato Yoshida =

Japanese bicycle racer

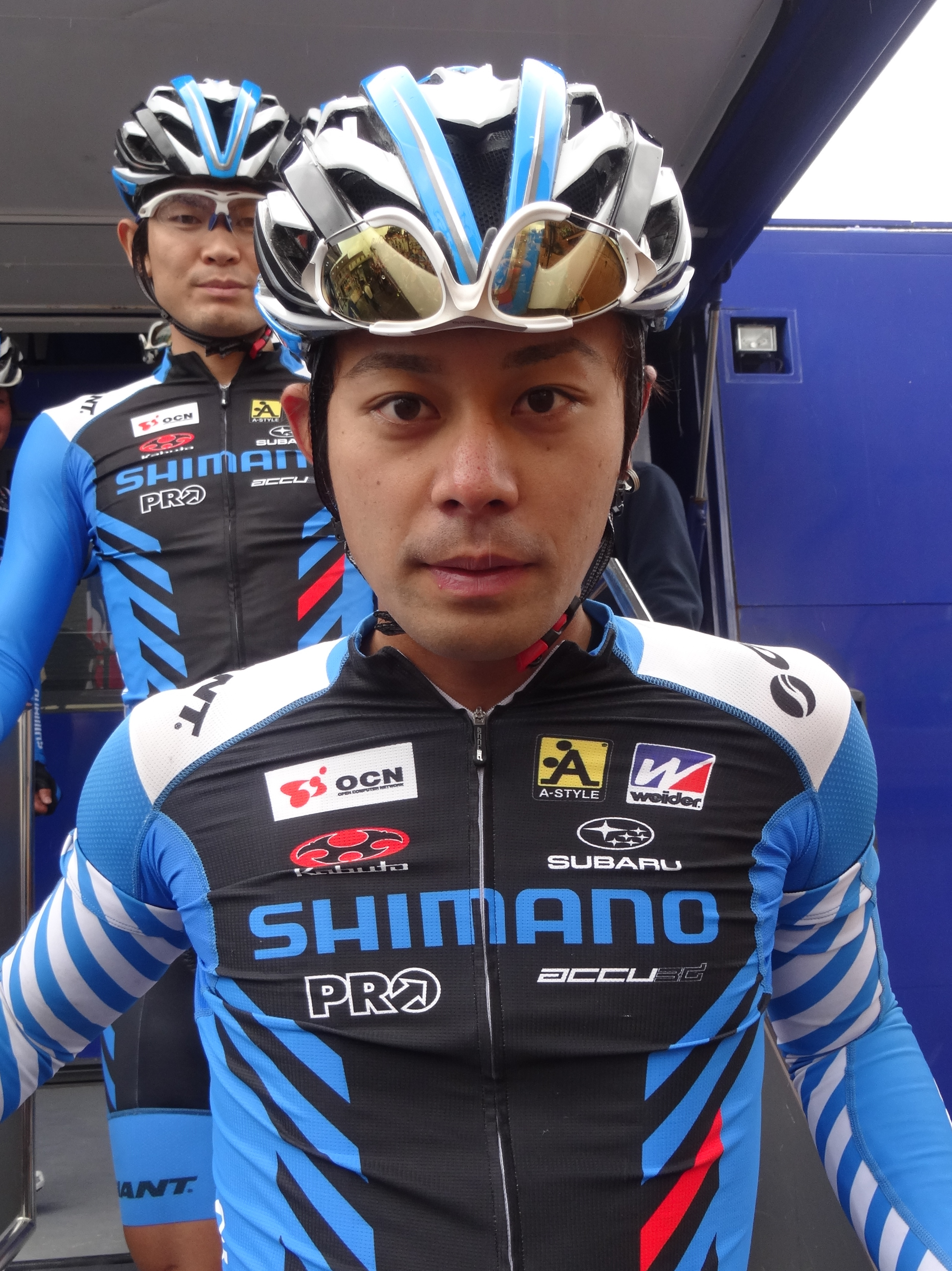
- Yoshida in 2014

Personal information
- Full name: Hayato Yoshida
- Born: 19 May 1989 (age 37) Nara Prefecture, Japan

Cycling career
- Sport: Cycling
- Current team: Retired
- Discipline: Road
- Role: Rider

Amateur team
- 2008–2011: National Institute of Fitness and Sports in Kanoya

Professional teams
- 2012: Bridgestone–Anchor
- 2013–2014: Shimano Racing Team
- 2015–2017: Matrix Powertag
- 2018–2019: Nippo–Vini Fantini–Europa Ovini
- 2020–2022: Matrix Powertag

Hayato Yoshida (吉田 隼人, Yoshida Hayato; born 19 May 1989) is a former-professional Japanese cyclist, who last rode for UCI Continental team Matrix Powertag.

== Major results ==
2007
1st Road race, Junior Asian Games
1st Stage 5 Tour de l'Abitibi
2008
1st Stage 3 Tour of Iran
2009
1st Team time trial, East Asian Games (with Makoto Iijima, Kazuo Inoue and Kazuhiro Mori)
2010
6th Overall Tour de Okinawa
2011
1st Time trial, National Under-23 Road Championships
2012
3rd Grand prix de Ben Guerir, Challenge des phosphates
2013
1st Stage 7 Tour de Taiwan
2015
4th Road race, National Under-23 Road Championships
