= Tashiro =

Tashiro (田代) may refer to:

== Places ==
- Tashiro, Akita
- Tashiro, Kagoshima

== People with the surname ==
- Junya Tashiro, Japanese fashion designer
- Kanami Tashiro (田代 佳奈美, born 1991), Japanese volleyball player
- Kanichirō Tashiro, Japanese general
- Masakazu Tashiro, Japanese footballer
- Masashi Tashiro, Japanese television performer
- Tsuramoto Tashiro, samurai
- Yasutaka Tashiro, Japanese cyclist
- Yoko Akino (real name is Yoko Tashiro), Japanese actress
- Yūzō Tashiro, Japanese footballer

== Other uses ==
- Tashiro's indicator, mixed pH indicator
