= Miyataka Shimizu =

Japanese professional cyclist

Personal information
- Full name: Miyataka Shimizu; Japanese: 清水 都貴
- Born: November 23, 1981 (age 44) Japan
- Height: 1.64 m (5 ft 4 1/2 in)
- Weight: 60 kg (130 lb; 9.4 st)

Cycling career
- Sport: Cycling
- Current team: Retired
- Discipline: Road
- Role: Rider

Professional teams
- 2004–2005: Team Bridgestone Anchor
- 2006: Cycle Racing Team Vang
- 2007: Nippo Corporation
- 2008–2009: Meitan Honpo–GDR
- 2010–2014: Bridgestone–Anchor

Major wins
- Vuelta a León (2007); Tour de Kumano (2008); Paris–Corrèze (2008); Tour de Hokkaido (2010)

Miyataka Shimizu (清水 都貴, Shimizu Miyataka) (born November 23, 1981) is a Japanese former professional racing cyclist.

== Career ==
Shimizu was born in Saitama Prefecture. After beginning cycling at Hatoyama High School, he attended the National Institute of Fitness and Sports in Kanoya before becoming a professional in 2004. Shimizu was in general considered an all-rounder. His victory at Paris–Corrèze in 2008, the first of a UCI category 1 stage race by a Japanese, has been termed "epoch making." In 2014, he was chosen to represent Japan at the 2014 UCI Road World Championships in the men's road race. He announced he would retire at the end of the 2014 season.

== Major results ==
2005
3rd Overall Tour de Hokkaido
2007
1st Overall Vuelta Ciclista a León

1st Stage 1

2008
1st Overall Tour de Kumano

1st Stages 2 & 3

1st Overall Paris–Corrèze

1st Stage 1

2nd Overall Tour de Okinawa
2009
3rd Kumamoto International Road Race
2010
1st Overall Tour de Martinique

1st Stage 7

1st Overall Tour de Hokkaido

1st Stage 2

1st Stage 2 Tour de Taiwan
2011
2nd Overall Tour of Thailand
3rd Road race, National Road Championships
2012
3rd Road race, National Road Championships
2013
1st Mountains classification Tour Alsace
2nd Road race, National Road Championships
3rd Overall Tour de Guadeloupe

1st Combination classification
1st Mountains classification

2014
3rd Overall Tour International de Constantine
3rd Circuit International d'Alger
8th Overall Tour International de Sétif
