= Yusuke Hatanaka =

Japanese cyclist (born 1985)

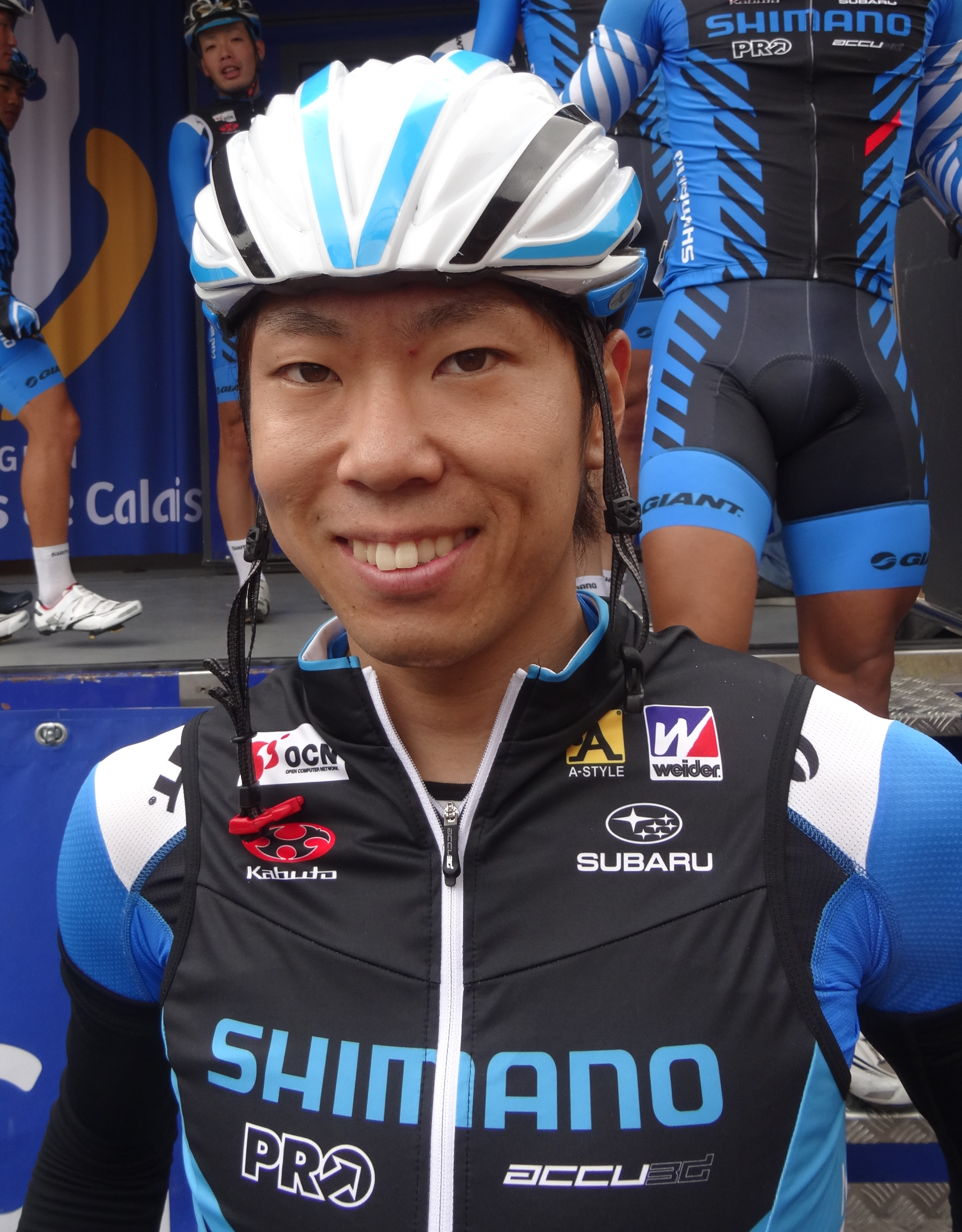
- Hatanaka in 2014

Personal information
- Full name: Yusuke Hatanaka; Japanese: 畑中 勇介
- Born: 21 June 1985 (age 41) Tokyo, Japan
- Height: 1.79 m (5 ft 10 in)
- Weight: 72 kg (159 lb)

Cycling career
- Sport: Cycling
- Current team: Kinan Racing Team
- Discipline: Road
- Role: Rider

Professional teams
- 2008: Skil–Shimano
- 2009–2014: Shimano Racing Team
- 2015–2020: Team UKYO
- 2021–2024: Kinan Cycling Team

Yusuke Hatanaka (畑中 勇介, Hatanaka Yūsuke; born June 21, 1985) is a Japanese former racing cyclist, who competed as a professional from 2008 to 2024.

== Major results ==
2005
2nd Time trial, National Under-23 Road Championships
2006
3rd Time trial, National Under-23 Road Championships
2007
1st Time trial, National Under-23 Road Championships
2008
1st Stage 7 Jelajah Malaysia
1st Stage 1b (TTT) Brixia Tour
2010
2nd Kumamoto International Road Race
3rd Japan Cup Cycle Road Race
8th Overall Tour de Okinawa
2011
1st Shimano Road Race
5th Japan Cup Cycle Road Race
6th Overall Tour de Okinawa

1st Stage 2

9th Overall Tour de Hokkaido
2012
2nd Tour de Okinawa
8th Road race, National Road Championships
9th Overall Tour de Taiwan
9th Overall Tour of Thailand

1st Points classification

9th Japan Cup Cycle Road Race
2014
5th Tour de Okinawa
7th Road race, National Road Championships
2015
2nd Road race, National Road Championships
10th Overall Tour de Ijen
10th Japan Cup Cycle Road Race
2016
9th Tour de Okinawa
2017
1st Road race, National Road Championships
3rd Tour de Okinawa
7th Overall Tour de Tochigi
10th Japan Cup Cycle Road Race
2018
1st Team time trial, Asian Road Championships
6th Tour de Okinawa
2019
9th Tour de Okinawa
