= Hiroki Nishimura =

Japanese cyclist

Personal information
- Full name: Hiroki Nishimura; Japanese: 西村 大輝
- Born: 20 October 1994 (age 31) Tokyo, Japan
- Height: 1.72 m (5 ft 8 in)
- Weight: 59 kg (130 lb)

Cycling career
- Sport: Cycling
- Current team: Astemo Utsunomiya Blitzen
- Discipline: Road
- Role: Rider (retired); Directeur sportif

Amateur team
- 2017: Nippo–Vini Fantini (stagiaire)

Professional teams
- 2013–2017: Shimano Racing Team
- 2018–2019: Nippo–Vini Fantini–Europa Ovini
- 2020–2022: Utsunomiya Blitzen

Managerial team
- 2023–: Utsunomiya Blitzen

Hiroki Nishimura (西村 大輝, Nishimura Hiroki; born 20 October 1994, in Tokyo) is a Japanese former cyclist, who now works as a directeur sportif for UCI Continental team Astemo Utsunomiya Blitzen.

In May 2019, he was named in the startlist for the 2019 Giro d'Italia. On the first stage, he finished outside the time limit and had to leave the race.

== Major results ==
2011
1st Road race, National Junior Road Championships
2012
Asian Junior Road Championships

1st Road race
2nd Time trial

National Junior Road Championships

1st Time trial
2nd Road race

2013
2nd Road race, National Under-23 Road Championships
9th Overall Tour de Hokkaido
2017
5th Road race, National Road Championships
2019
9th Overall Tour of Thailand

=== Grand Tour general classification results timeline ===
Grand Tour	2019
Giro d'Italia	DNF
Tour de France	—
Vuelta a España	—
