= Jun'ya =

- Gender: Male

Origin
- Origin: Japanese
- Meaning: Different meanings depending on the kanji used

Jun'ya or Junya (written: 純也, 純弥, 純彌, 純矢, 順也, 淳也, 淳弥, 淳矢, 淳哉, 惇也, 準也, 潤也, 潤哉 or 準弥) is a masculine Japanese given name. Notable people with the name include:

- Junya Enoki (榎木 淳弥; born 1988), Japanese voice actor
- Junya Hosokawa (細川 淳矢; born 1984), Japanese footballer
- Junya Ikeda (池田 純矢; born 1992), Japanese actor and voice actor
- Junya Inoue (井上 淳哉; born 1971), Japanese manga artist
- Jun'ya Ishigami (石上 純也; born 1974), Japanese architect
- Junya Kato (加藤 潤也; born 1994), Japanese footballer
- Junya Kodo (小堂 準也; born 1983), Japanese mixed martial artist
- Junya Koga (古賀 淳也; born 1987), Japanese swimmer
- Jun'ya Koizumi (小泉 純也; 1904–1969), Japanese politician
- Junya Kuno (久野 純弥; born 1988), Japanese footballer
- Junya Kurose (黒瀬 純哉; born July 9, 1994), Japanese footballer
- Junya Nakano (仲野 順也; born 1971), Japanese video game composer
- Junya Nodake (野嶽 惇也; born 1994), Japanese footballer
- Junya Ogawa (小川 淳也; born 1971), Japanese politician
- Junya Osaki (大﨑 淳矢; born 1991), Japanese footballer
- Junya Ōta (太田 順也; born 1977), Japanese programmer
- Junya Sano (佐野 淳哉; born 1982), Japanese cyclist
- Junya Satō (佐藤 純彌; born 1932), Japanese film director
- Junya Suzuki (footballer, born January 1996) (鈴木 準弥), Japanese footballer
- Junya Suzuki (footballer, born May 1996) (鈴木 順也), Japanese footballer
- Junya Takahashi (高橋 潤哉; born 1997), Japanese footballer
- Junya Tanaka (田中 順也; born 1987), Japanese footballer
- Junya Tashiro (born 1974), Japanese fashion designer
- Junya Watanabe (渡辺 淳弥; born 1961), Japanese fashion designer
- Junya Yamashiro (山城 純也; born 1985), Japanese footballer
- Jun'ya Yokota (横田 順彌; 1945-2019), science fiction writer and cultural historian
