= Takayuki Abe =

Japanese cyclist (born 1986)

Personal information
- Full name: Takayuki Abe; Japanese: 阿部 嵩之
- Born: 12 June 1986 (age 40) Furuu District, Hokkaido, Japan
- Height: 1.77 m (5 ft 10 in)
- Weight: 66 kg (146 lb)

Cycling career
- Sport: Cycling
- Current team: Velolien Matsuyama
- Discipline: Road
- Role: Rider

Amateur teams
- 2007–2008: Dokyu Hokkaido
- 2010–2011: Shimano Racing Team
- 2010–2012: Parkhotel Rooding Valkenburg

Professional teams
- 2009: Shimano Racing Team
- 2012: Shimano Racing Team
- 2013: Team UKYO
- 2014–2023: Utsunomiya Blitzen
- 2024–: Velolien Matsuyama

Takayuki Abe (阿部 嵩之, Abe Takayuki; born 12 June 1986) is a Japanese cyclist, who currently competes for UCI Continental team Velolien Matsuyama.

== Major results ==
2009
2nd Overall Tour de Okinawa
2011
5th Time trial, National Road Championships
2013
1st Mountains classification, Tour de Hokkaido
2014
4th Time trial, National Road Championships
2016
1st Prologue Tour de Kumano
5th Time trial, National Road Championships
2018
1st Prologue Tour de Kumano
2021
5th Time trial, National Road Championships
2022
2nd Oita Urban Classic
6th Tour de Okinawa
