= Yasuharu Nakajima =

Japanese bicycle racer

Personal information
- Full name: Yasuharu Nakajima; Japanese: 中島 康晴
- Born: 27 December 1984 (age 41) Fukui, Japan
- Height: 1.72 m (5 ft 8 in)
- Weight: 64 kg (141 lb)

Cycling career
- Sport: Cycling
- Current team: Retired
- Discipline: Road
- Role: Rider; Directeur sportif
- Rider type: Sprinter

Professional teams
- 2007–2009: Nippo Corporation–Meitan Hompo–Asada
- 2010: Nippo
- 2011–2016: Aisan Racing Team
- 2017–2022: Kinan Cycling Team

Managerial team
- 2023–: Kinan Racing Team

Yasuharu Nakajima (中島 康晴, Nakajima Yasuharu; born 27 December 1984 in Echizen, Fukui) is a Japanese former professional cyclist, who last rode for UCI Continental team Kinan Racing Team. He has won a stage at the HC classified Tour of Hainan and won the overall classification twice in a row at the Tour of Thailand. He now works as a directeur sportif for UCI Continental team Kinan Racing Team.

== Personal life ==
He graduated from the National Institute of Fitness and Sports in Kanoya in 2007.

== Major results ==
2006
1st Young rider classification Tour de Hokkaido
2009
1st Kumamoto International Road Race
9th Overall Tour de Okinawa
2010
3rd Banja Luka–Belgrade I
7th Kumamoto International Road Race
2011
1st Stage 4 Tour de Singkarak
1st Stage 2 Tour of Hainan
2012
1st Stage 6 Tour de Singkarak
3rd Overall Jelajah Malaysia
3rd Tour de Okinawa
2013
3rd Overall Tour of Thailand
4th Overall Tour de Korea
10th Ronde Pévéloise
2014
1st Overall Tour of Thailand

1st Points classification

7th Overall Tour de East Java

1st Points classification
1st Stage 1

2015
1st Overall Tour of Thailand
2017
7th Tour de Okinawa
2018
1st Overall Sri Lanka T-Cup

1st Stage 1

2019
1st Points classification, Tour de Taiwan
9th Overall Tour de Iskandar Johor
