= Kazuyuki Manabe =

Japanese cyclist (born 1970)

Personal information
- Full name: Kazuyuki Manabe; Japanese: 真鍋和幸
- Born: February 16, 1970 (age 56) Mitoyo, Kagawa

Cycling career
- Sport: Cycling
- Discipline: Road
- Role: Rider

Professional teams
- 1992–2004: Miyata Racing Team
- 2005–2007: Team Nippo
- 2008: Nippo–Endeka
- 2009–2018: Matrix Powertag

Kazuyuki Manabe (真鍋和幸, Manabe Kazuyuki; born February 16, 1970 in Mitoyo, Kagawa) is a Japanese road racing cyclist, who last rode for UCI Continental team Matrix Powertag.

Manabe participated in the 1996 Summer Olympics in the men's individual road race, but did not finish. He was third in the Japanese National Road Race Championships in 1998, 2003 and 2005.

== Major results ==
1998
3rd Road race, National Road Championships
3rd Tour de Okinawa
1999
3rd Tour de Hokkaido
2000
2nd Tour de Okinawa
2003
1st Stage 1 Tour de Taiwan
3rd Road race, National Road Championships
3rd Overall Tour of China

1st Stage 3

2004
10th Tour de Okinawa
2005
3rd Road race, National Road Championships
2006
10th Overall Tour de Hokkaido
2008
10th Overall Tour de Kumano
2010
10th Overall Tour de Okinawa
