= Kazuo Inoue =

Japanese bicycle racer (born 1981)

Personal information
- Full name: Kazuo Inoue; Japanese: 井上 和郎
- Born: 17 February 1981 (age 45) Fukui, Fukui, Japan

Cycling career
- Sport: Cycling
- Current team: Retired
- Discipline: Road
- Role: Rider

Amateur team
- 2001–2002: Balba Works

Professional teams
- 2003–2005: Bridgestone Anchor
- 2006: Team Vang
- 2007: Meitan Honpo
- 2008: Nippo Endeka
- 2009: Amica Chips–Knauf
- 2010: Team Nippo
- 2011–2016: Bridgestone–Anchor

Kazuo Inoue (井上 和郎, Inoue Kazuo; born 17 February 1981) is a Japanese former professional racing cyclist. He finished second in the Japanese National Road Race Championships in 2008 and 2014, and represented Japan in the 2008 UCI Road World Championships. He has won the elite road race competition at the National Sports Festival of Japan four times.

== Major results ==
2008
2nd Road race, National Road Championships
2009
1st Road race, East Asian Games
6th Kumamoto International Road Race
8th Overall Tour de Okinawa
2010
4th Kumamoto International Road Race
2011
1st Stage 2 Tour de Filipinas
2012
9th Overall Tour de Hokkaido
2014
2nd Road race, National Road Championships
2015
5th Tour de Okinawa
