= Arashiro =

Arashiro (新城 or 安良城) is a Ryukyuan surname. Its alternative readings include Aragusuku, Aragushiku and Shinjō. Notable people with the surname include:

- Beni Arashiro (安良城 紅, born 1986), Japanese singer
- Yudai Arashiro (新城 雄大, born 1995), Japanese cyclist
- Yukiya Arashiro (新城 幸也, born 1984), Japanese road cyclist

== See also ==
- Okinawan name
- Okinawa Prefecture
