= Takeaki Amezawa =

Japanese cyclist (born 1995)

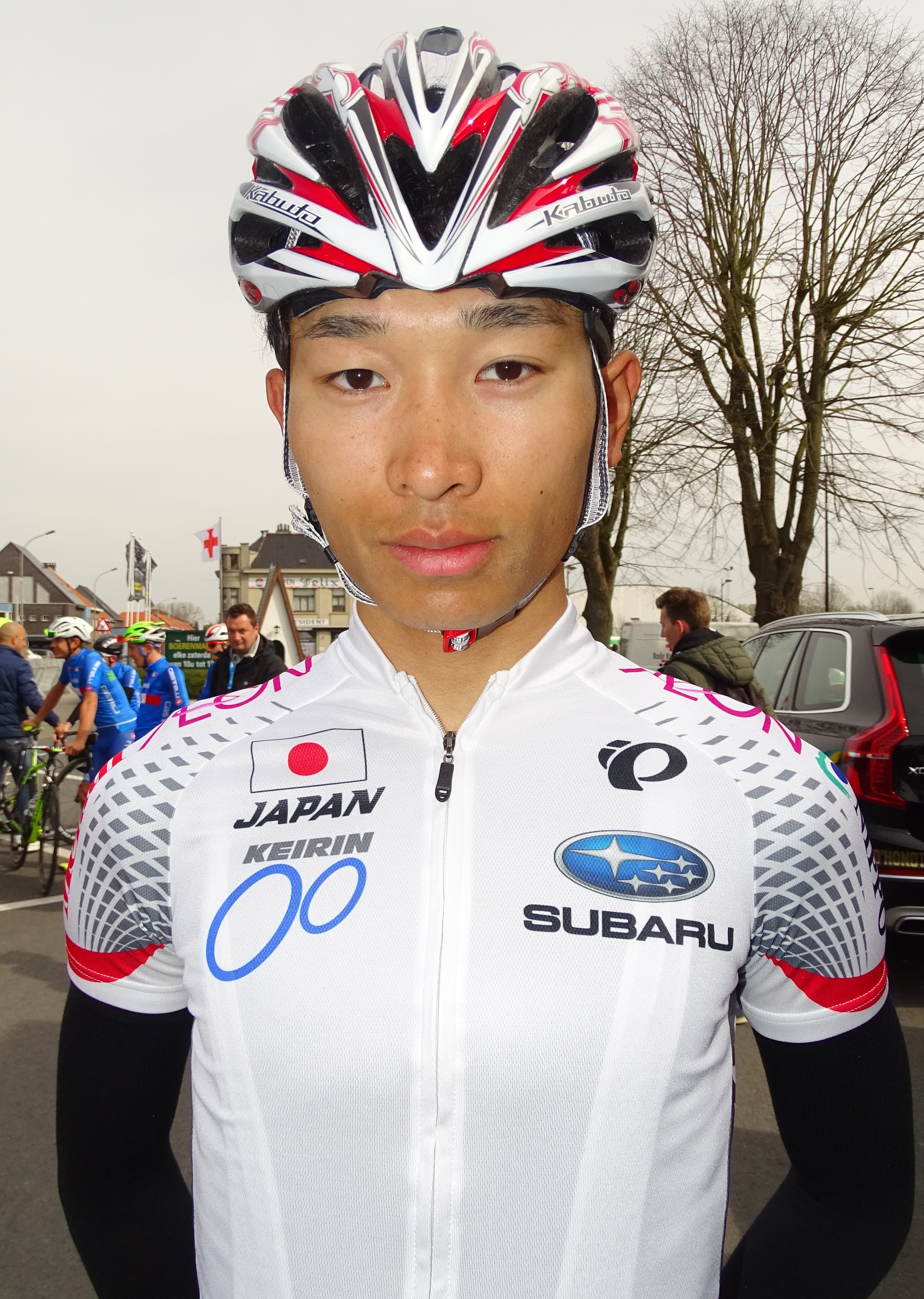
- Amezawa in 2016

Personal information
- Full name: Takeaki Amezawa
- Born: 4 February 1995 (age 31) Shimotsuke, Tochigi, Japan
- Height: 1.73 m (5 ft 8 in)
- Weight: 60 kg (132 lb)

Cycling career
- Sport: Cycling
- Current team: Retired
- Discipline: Road
- Role: Rider

Amateur teams
- 2011–2012: Blau Blitzen
- 2013–2014: Nasu Blasen

Professional teams
- 2015: Nasu Blasen
- 2016–2018: Utsunomiya Blitzen
- 2019–2020: Ljubljana Gusto Santic

Takeaki Amezawa (born 4 February 1995) is a Japanese former professional cyclist, who rode professionally between 2015 and 2020 for the Nasu Blasen, Utsunomiya Blitzen and Ljubljana Gusto Santic teams.

== Major results ==
2016
6th Tour de Okinawa
2017
2nd Team time trial, Asian Road Championships
3rd Japan Cup Cycle Road Race
2018
1st Stage 2 Tour of Japan
9th Overall Tour de Kumano
