= Kyoshi Miura =

Japanese cyclist

Personal information
- Full name: Kyoshi Miura; Japanese: 三浦 恭資
- Born: 9 January 1961 (age 65) Tosu, Saga, Japan

Cycling career
- Sport: Cycling
- Current team: Retired
- Disciplines: Road; Mountain biking
- Role: Rider

Professional teams
- 1991–1993: Japan ProRoad Project
- 1994: Inoac–Deki
- 1995–1997: Tönissteiner–Saxon
- 2002: Giant Asia Racing Team
- 2005: Kinan CCD
- 2006: Matrix

Kyoshi Miura (三浦 恭資, Miura Kyōshi; born 9 January 1961) is a Japanese former cyclist. He was eight times national road race champion, raced professionally in Europe, represented Japan at world track championships, and even became national champion in mountain biking. He competed at the 1988 Summer Olympics and the 1996 Summer Olympics, the first in the men's individual road race, the second in men's cross-country mountain biking. He won the second edition of the Tour de Okinawa in 1990. After retirement, he began coaching and served as a coach for the national team at the 2008 Summer Olympics.

== Major results ==
1990
1st Tour de Okinawa
1991
1st Road race, National Road Championships
1992
1st Road race, National Road Championships
2001
5th Tour de Okinawa
