= Genki Yamamoto =

Japanese cyclist

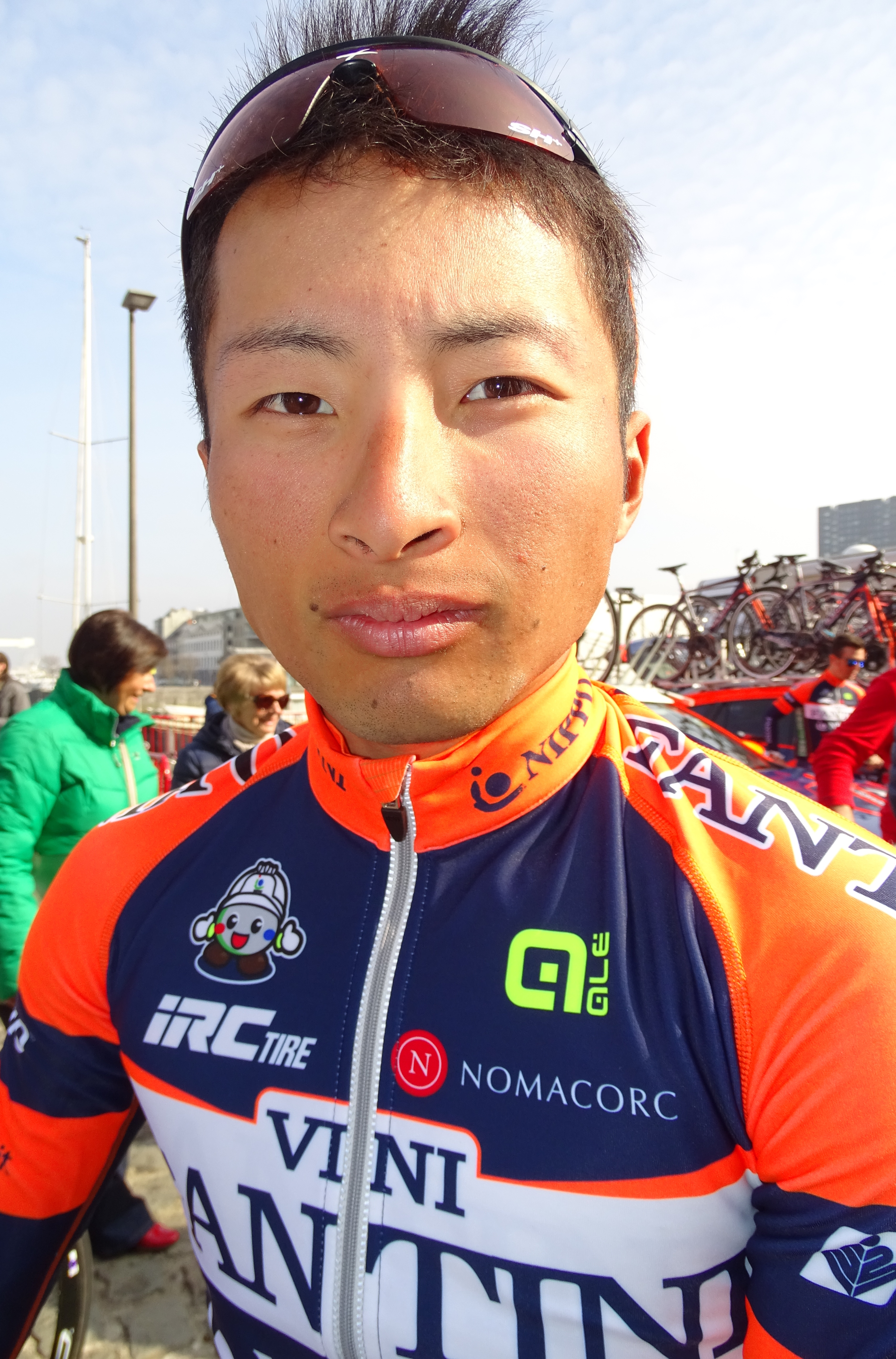
- Genki Yamamoto at the 2015 Scheldeprijs.

Personal information
- Full name: Genki Yamamoto; Japanese: 山本 元喜
- Born: 19 November 1991 (age 34) Heguri, Nara, Japan
- Height: 163 cm (5 ft 4 in)
- Weight: 62 kg (137 lb)

Cycling career
- Sport: Cycling
- Current team: Kinan Racing Team
- Discipline: Road
- Role: Rider
- Rider type: Puncheur

Amateur teams
- 2010–2013: NIFS in Kanoya
- 2014: Ikaruga AsTifo

Professional teams
- 2014–2016: Vini Fantini–Nippo
- 2017–: Kinan Cycling Team

Major wins
- One-day races and Classics National Road Race Championships (2018)
Medal record
Representing Japan
Men's road bicycle racing
Asian Under-23 Championships
Silver medal – second place	2012 Kuala Lumpur	Time trial
Summer Universiade
Bronze medal – third place	2011 Shenzhen	Road race

Genki Yamamoto (山本 元喜, Yamamoto Genki; born 19 November 1991) is a Japanese professional racing cyclist, who currently rides for UCI Continental team Kinan Racing Team.

== Career ==
Yamamoto won the third stage of the Tour de Hokkaido twice while still a student at the National Institute of Fitness and Sports in Kanoya, first in 2010 and again in 2013. He won the Under-23 Japanese National Road Race Championships twice in a row in 2010 and 2011. He joined Vini Fantini–Nippo in 2014 and stayed on as it became a Professional Continental team starting in the 2015 season. He was named in the start list for the 2016 Giro d'Italia. He transferred to the Kinan Cycling Team for the 2017 season.

== Major results ==
2009
2nd Road race, National Junior Road Championships
Asian Junior Road Championships

7th Time trial
8th Road race

2010
1st Road race, National Under-23 Road Championships
1st Stage 3 Tour de Hokkaido
2011
1st Road race, National Under-23 Road Championships
3rd Road race, Summer Universiade
3rd Japan Cup Open Road Race
6th Overall Tour de Hokkaido
2012
2nd Time trial, Asian Under-23 Road Championships
6th Time trial, National Under-23 Road Championships
8th Overall Tour de Singkarak
2013
National Under-23 Road Championships

1st Time trial
3rd Road race

1st Stage 3 Tour de Hokkaido
4th Time trial, Asian Under-23 Road Championships
2014
National Road Championships

3rd Time trial
3rd Road race

2015
6th Time trial, National Road Championships
6th Overall Tour de Korea
2017
5th Overall Tour de Flores
7th Overall Tour de Kumano
2018
1st Road race, National Road Championships
5th Overall Tour de Ijen
2019
5th Overall Tour de Hokkaido
5th Overall Tour de Siak
7th Oita Urban Classic
2022
2nd Tour de Okinawa
10th Overall Tour of Japan
2023
1st Stage 2 Tour de Kumano
3rd Road race, National Road Championships
10th Mine Akiyoshi-dai Karst International Road Race

=== Grand Tour general classification results timeline ===
Grand Tour	2016
Giro d'Italia	151
Tour de France	—
Vuelta a España	—

Legend
—	Did not compete
DNF	Did not finish
