= Yudai Arashiro =

Japanese cyclist (born 1995)

Personal information
- Full name: Yudai Arashiro
- Born: 3 July 1995 (age 31) Ishigaki, Japan
- Height: 1.76 m (5 ft 9 in)
- Weight: 65 kg (143 lb)

Cycling career
- Sport: Cycling
- Current team: Kinan Racing Team
- Discipline: Road
- Role: Rider

Amateur teams
- 2014: Nasu Blasen
- 2016–2017: EQA

Professional teams
- 2015: Nasu Blasen
- 2018–: Kinan Cycling Team

Yudai Arashiro (born 3 July 1995) is a Japanese cyclist, who currently rides for UCI Continental team Kinan Racing Team.

== Major results ==
2017
1st Time trial, National Under-23 Road Championships
2018
3rd Road race, National Road Championships
2022
2nd Road race, National Road Championships
2024
7th Oita Urban Classic
2025
7th Oita Urban Classic
8th Tour de Okinawa
