= Yuzuru Suzuki =

Japanese cyclist

Personal information
- Full name: Yuzuru Suzuki; Japanese: 鈴木 譲
- Born: 6 November 1985 (age 40) Kawasaki, Kanagawa, Japan
- Height: 1.70 m (5 ft 7 in)
- Weight: 57 kg (126 lb)

Cycling career
- Sport: Cycling
- Current team: Velolien Matsuyama
- Discipline: Road
- Role: Rider

Amateur teams
- 2004–2005: Tokai University
- 2006: You Can–Specialized–Nissyo

Professional teams
- 2007: Team Miyata
- 2008: Aisan Racing Team
- 2009–2013: Shimano Racing Team
- 2014–2020: Utsunomiya Blitzen
- 2021–2023: Aisan Racing Team
- 2024–: Velolien Matsuyama

Yuzuru Suzuki (鈴木 譲, Suzuki Yuzuru; born 6 November 1985) is a Japanese cyclist, who currently competes for UCI Continental team Velolien Matsuyama. He turned professional in 2007 with Team Miyata.

== Major results ==
2008
7th Overall Tour of Hong Kong Shanghai
2009
9th Overall Tour de Kumano
2011
8th Overall Tour de Taiwan
10th Overall Tour de Hokkaido
2012
6th Overall Tour of Japan
8th Overall Tour de Hokkaido
2015
6th Overall Tour de Kumano
2016
4th Time trial, National Road Championships
9th Overall Tour de Hokkaido
2017
3rd Overall Tour de Tochigi
2018
1st Mountains classification, Tour of Japan
4th Overall Tour de Kumano
6th Overall Tour de Tochigi
2019
5th Time trial, National Road Championships
