= Keigo Kusaba =

Japanese cyclist

Personal information
- Born: 8 September 1996 (age 30) Kasugai, Aichi, Japan

Cycling career
- Sport: Cycling
- Current team: Aisan Racing Team
- Discipline: Road
- Role: Rider

Professional teams
- 2019–: Aisan Racing Team
- 2019: Nippo–Vini Fantini–Faizanè (stagiaire)

Major wins
- One-day races and Classics National Road Race Championships (2021)

Keigo Kusaba (草場 啓吾, Kusaba Keigo; born 8 September 1996) is a Japanese cyclist, who currently rides for UCI Continental team Aisan Racing Team. He won the Japanese National Road Race Championships in 2021.

== Major results ==
2014
2nd Time trial, National Junior Road Championships
3rd Time trial, Asian Junior Road Championships
2017
10th Road race, Asian Under-23 Road Championships
4th Road race, National Under-23 Road Championships

2nd Team time trial

2021
1st Road race, National Road Championships
2023
5th Tour de Okinawa
7th Road race, National Road Championships
