= Shōtarō Iribe =

Japanese bicycle racer (born 1989)

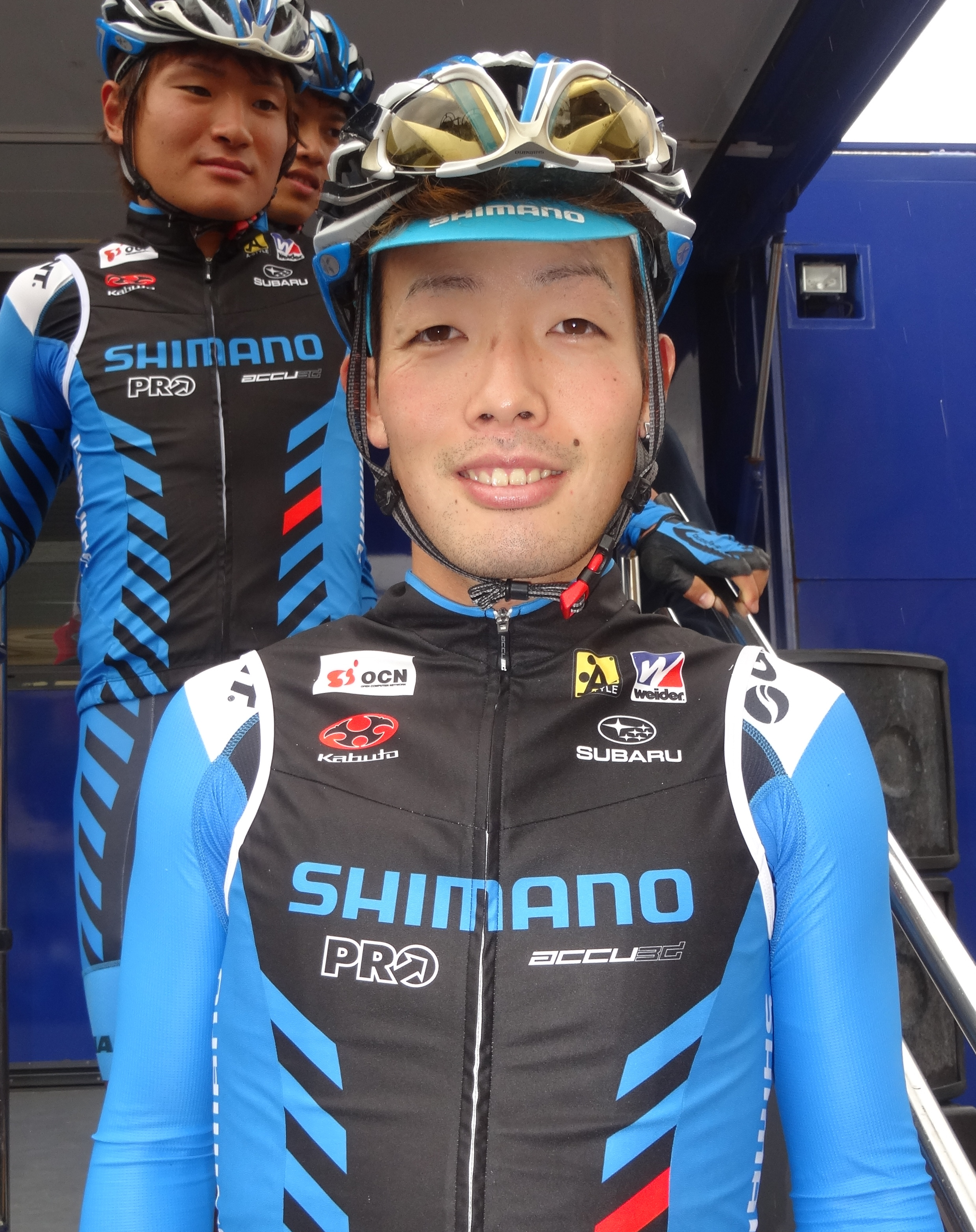
- Iribe at the Ronde Pévéloise 2014

Personal information
- Born: August 1, 1989 (age 37) Nara Prefecture, Japan
- Height: 1.68 m (5 ft 6 in)
- Weight: 61 kg (134 lb)

Cycling career
- Sport: Cycling
- Current team: Shimano Racing Team
- Discipline: Road
- Role: Rider

Amateur team
- 2021–2022: Yowamushi Pedal Cycling Team

Professional teams
- 2012–2019: Shimano Racing Team
- 2020: NTT Pro Cycling
- 2023–: Shimano Racing

Major wins
- One-day races and Classics National Road Race Championships (2019)

Shōtarō Iribe (入部 正太朗, Iribe Shōtarō; born 1 August 1989) is a Japanese professional cyclist, who currently rides for UCI Continental team Shimano Racing Team.

In 2019 he won the Japanese National Road Race Championships. For the 2021 season, he rode for amateur team Yowamushi Pedal Cycling Team.

== Major results ==
2014
3rd Tour de Okinawa
2015
2nd Tour de Okinawa
8th Overall Tour de Hokkaido
2016
9th Overall Tour de Kumano
10th Tour de Okinawa
2017
1st Stage 1 Tour de Kumano
7th Overall Tour of Thailand
2018
1st Stage 2 Tour of Thailand
1st Stage 2 Tour de Kumano
4th Road race, National Road Championships
5th Overall Tour de Tochigi
2019
1st Road race, National Road Championships
2021
9th Road race, National Road Championships
2024
6th Overall Tour de Kyushu
2025
3rd Oita Urban Classic
