= Jin Okubo =

Japanese cyclist

Personal information
- Full name: Jin Okubo; Japanese: 大久保 陣
- Born: 8 October 1988 (age 38) Osaka, Japan
- Height: 1.84 m (6 ft 0 in)
- Weight: 66 kg (146 lb)

Cycling career
- Sport: Cycling
- Discipline: Road
- Role: Rider

Amateur teams
- 2007–2010: Hosei University
- 2011–2012: Pearl Izumi–Sumita–Ravanello

Professional teams
- 2013: Team UKYO
- 2014–2016: Utsunomiya Blitzen
- 2017–2018: Bridgestone–Anchor
- 2019: Kinan Cycling Team
- 2020: Utsunomiya Blitzen

Jin Okubo (大久保 陣, Ōkubo Jin; born 8 October 1988) is a Japanese road cyclist, who most recently rode for UCI Continental team Utsunomiya Blitzen.

== Major results ==
2016
1st Stage 3 Tour de Kumano
