= Nasu Blasen =

Japanese cycling team

Team information
- UCI code: NAS
- Registered: Japan
- Founded: 2013
- Disbanded: 2023
- Discipline: Road
- Status: National (2013–2014); UCI Continental (2015–2022)
- Bicycles: Boma
- Website: Team home page

Key personnel
- General manager: Kota Iwai
- Team managers: Atsuhito Wakasugi; Takaaki Higuchi

Team name history
- 2013–2022: Nasu Blasen

Nasu Blasen (那須ブラーゼン, Nasu Burāzen) is a Japanese UCI Continental cycling team established in 2013. It gained UCI continental status in 2015, and the team was led by 2014 Japanese National Road Race Championships winner Junya Sano.

In 2023, the team joined with Saitama Dreve and raced as the Saitama Nasu Sunbrave. In 2024, the operating company NASPO stopped business by the end of February and it was reported to file bankruptcy. A new amateur team, Blasen Cycling Club, inherited the name and emblem, managed by a former Blasen rider Takeaki Amezawa.

== Team roster ==
As of 21 February 2021.

Rider	Date of birth
Daisuke Kaneko (JPN)	13 November 1991 (age 34)
Daigo Kon (JPN)	13 March 1998 (age 28)
Hayato Nishio (JPN)	9 January 1994 (age 32)
Keito Nishio (JPN)	6 July 1995 (age 31)
Hiroshi Sato (JPN)	9 December 1999 (age 26)
Takashi Sato (JPN)	9 December 1999 (age 26)
Masayuki Shibata (JPN)	3 November 1994 (age 31)

Rider	Date of birth
Shota Shimano (JPN)	4 September 2000 (age 26)
Ryuji Shinkai (JPN)	14 July 2000 (age 26)
Taku Takemura (JPN)	28 September 1997 (age 28)
Junsei Tani (JPN)	4 August 1994 (age 32)
Shotaro Watanabe (JPN)	29 August 1994 (age 32)
Ryuta Yamashina (JPN)	12 January 2002 (age 24)

== Major results ==
2022
1st Stage 2 Tour de Hokkaido, Junsei Tani
