= Masaki Yamamoto (cyclist) =

Japanese cyclist

Personal information
- Full name: Masaki Yamamoto
- Born: 8 January 1996 (age 30) Uda, Japan
- Height: 1.71 m (5 ft 7 in)
- Weight: 68 kg (150 lb)

Cycling career
- Sport: Cycling
- Current team: Team UKYO
- Discipline: Road
- Role: Rider

Amateur teams
- 2015–2016: NIFS in Kanoya
- 2017: Eurasia–IRC Tire

Professional teams
- 2018–2022: Kinan Cycling Team
- 2023–: JCL Team UKYO

Major wins
- One-day races and Classics National Road Race Championships (2023)

Masaki Yamamoto (Japanese: 山本大喜, Hepburn: Yamamoto Masaki) (born 8 January 1996) is a Japanese cyclist, who currently rides for UCI Continental team Team UKYO.

== Major results ==
2013
2nd Time trial, Asian Junior Road Championships
3rd Time trial, National Junior Road Championships
2014
1st Time trial, National Junior Road Championships
2015
2nd Time trial, National Under-23 Road Championships
2016
3rd Time trial, Asian Under-23 Road Championships
2017
3rd Road race, National Under-23 Road Championships
2018
Asian Road Championships

1st Team time trial
1st Under-23 road race

2021
2nd Oita Urban Classic
3rd Overall Tour of Japan
National Road Championship

2nd Time trial
4th Road race

2022
3rd Road race, National Road Championship
7th Overall Tour de Kumano

1st Mountains classification

8th Overall Tour of Japan
2023
National Road Championships

1st Road race
2nd Time trial

1st Tour de Okinawa
2nd Overall Tour de Kumano

1st Mountains classification
1st Stage 1

2024
2nd Oita Urban Classic
3rd Overall Tour de Kumano
National Road Championship

3rd Road race
4th Time trial

5th Asian Road Championships
