= Kinan Racing Team =

Japanese cycling team

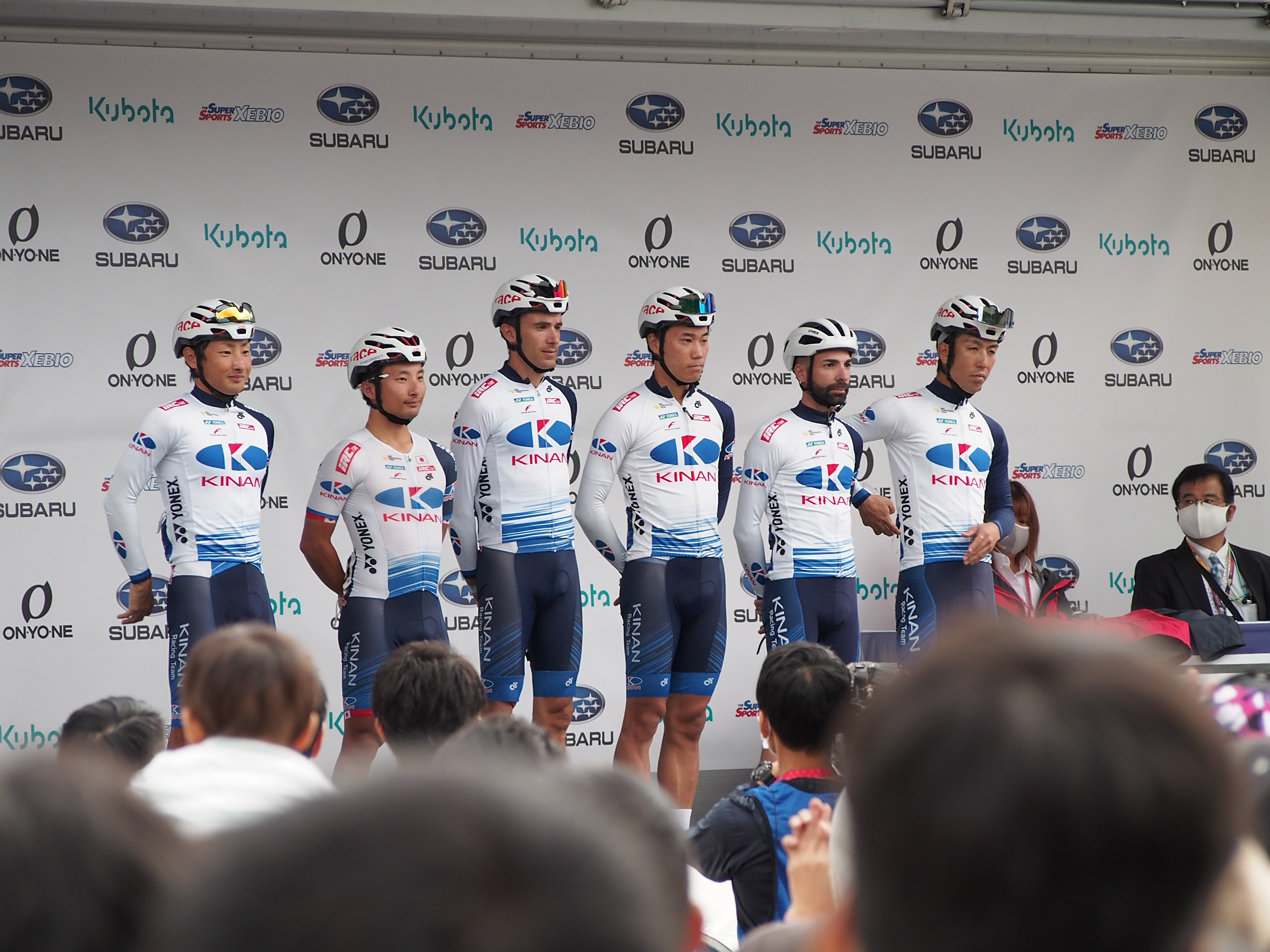
- The team at the 2022 Japan Cup

Team information
- UCI code: KIN
- Registered: Japan
- Founded: 2015
- Discipline: Road
- Status: UCI Continental
- Bicycles: Colnago
- Website: Team home page

Key personnel
- General manager: Tetsuya Ishida
- Team managers: Tetsuya Ishida; Takeaki Ayabe; Shinji Suzuki

Team name history
- 2015–2021 2022–: Kinan Cycling Team; Kinan Racing Team

Kinan Racing Team is a Japanese UCI Continental cycling team established in 2015. Before registering as a UCI Continental team, the team was known as "Kinan AACA". The 2015 team featured three foreign riders, including Jai Crawford.

== Team roster ==
As of 27 January 2024.

Rider	Date of birth
Yudai Arashiro (JPN)	3 July 1995 (age 31)
Ryan Cavanagh (AUS)	22 November 1995 (age 30)
Shinpei Fukuda (JPN)	22 November 1987 (age 38)
Yusuke Hatanaka (JPN)	21 June 1985 (age 41)
Raymond Kreder (NED)	26 October 1989 (age 36)
Thomas Lebas (FRA)	14 December 1985 (age 40)

Rider	Date of birth
Daiki Magosaki (JPN)	18 July 1996 (age 30)
Taishi Miyazaki (JPN)	5 September 1999 (age 27)
Drew Morey (AUS)	27 November 1996 (age 29)
Koki Shirakawa (JPN)	15 May 1997 (age 29)
Genki Yamamoto (JPN)	19 November 1991 (age 34)
Shingen Yunoki (JPN)	5 November 2004 (age 21)

== Major wins ==
2016
Overall Tour de Ijen, Jai Crawford
Stage 4 Tour de Ijen, Jai Crawford
Stage 3 Le Tour de Filipinas, Wesley Sulzberger
Stage 3 Tour de Singkarak, Ricardo Garcia Ambroa
2017
Overall Le Tour de Filipinas, Jai Crawford
Stage 7 Tour of Japan, Marcos Garcia
Stage 2 Tour de Kumano, Thomas Lebas
Overall Tour de Flores, Thomas Lebas

Stage 6, Thomas Lebas

Overall Tour de Hokkaido, Marcos Garcia

Stage 3, Marcos Garcia

2018
Asian Continental U23 Road Race Championships, Masaki Yamamoto
Overall Sri Lanka T-Cup, Yasuharu Nakajima

Stage 1, Yasuharu Nakajima

Overall Tour of Japan, Marcos Garcia

Stage 5, Thomas Lebas
Stage 6, Marcos García

Japan National Road Championship, Genki Yamamoto
Japan U23 Time Trial, National Road Championships, Masaki Yamamoto
2019
Points classification Tour de Taiwan, Yasuharu Nakajima
Mountains classification Tour de Kumano, Marcos Garcia

Stage 2, Thomas Lebas

Overall Tour de Indonesia, Thomas Lebas
Stage 4 Tour de Ijen, Thomas Lebas
Overall Tour of Peninsular, Marcos García

Mountains classification, Marcos García
Stage 4, Marcos García

2022
Mountains classification Tour de Kumano, Masaki Yamamoto
2023
Stage 2 Tour de Kumano, Genki Yamamoto
2024
Oceania Road Championships, Ryan Cavanagh
2025
National Road Championships, Time trial, Rein Taaramäe
Grand Prix Ordu, Rein Taaramäe
2026
Overall Tour of Sharjah, Rein Taaramäe

Stage 2, Rein Taaramäe

Stage 5 Tour de Taiwan, Lucas Carstensen
Stage 8 Tour of Japan, Lucas Carstensen
