= Sri Lanka T-Cup =

Race details
- Date: May
- Region: Sri Lanka
- Discipline: Road
- Competition: UCI Asia Tour
- Type: Stage race
- Web site: tcup.lsrtravel.com

History
- First edition: 2017
- Editions: 2 (as of 2018)
- First winner: George Oconer (PHI)
- Most wins: No repeat winners
- Most recent: Yasuharu Nakajima (JPN)

The Sri Lanka T-Cup is a multi-day cycling race in Sri Lanka. The race was created as an amateur event in 2017, and was upgraded to the UCI Asia Tour in category 2.2 in 2018.

The event for 2019 was canceled due to the 2019 Sri Lanka Easter bombings.

== Winners ==
Year	Country	Rider	Team
2017	Philippines	George Luis Oconer	
2018	Japan	Yasuharu Nakajima	Kinan Cycling Team
2019	No race		
