= Junya Sano =

Japanese road racing cyclist

Personal information
- Full name: Junya Sano; Japanese: 佐野 淳哉
- Born: January 9, 1982 (age 44) Shimizu, Shizuoka, Japan
- Height: 1.78 m (5 ft 10 in)
- Weight: 76 kg (168 lb; 12.0 st)

Cycling career
- Sport: Cycling
- Current team: Retired
- Discipline: Road
- Role: Rider
- Rider type: All-rounder

Amateur teams
- 2014: Nasu Blasen
- 2020–2022: Levante Fuji Shizuoka

Professional teams
- 2005: Bridgestone Anchor
- 2006–2007: Cycle Racing Team Vang
- 2008: Nippo–Endeka
- 2009: Nippo–Colnago
- 2010: Team Nippo
- 2011–2012: D'Angelo & Antenucci–Nippo
- 2013: Vini Fantini–Selle Italia
- 2015: Nasu Blasen
- 2016–2019: Matrix Powertag
- 2023: Matrix Powertag

Junya Sano (佐野 淳哉, Sano Jun'ya; born January 9, 1982) is a Japanese former-professional road bicycle racer, who last rode for the cycling team Matrix Powertag.

== Career ==
Born in Shimizu, Shizuoka, Sano begin his career in 2005 with the Japanese continental team Bridgestone Anchor. In the 2008 season, he changed over to Team Nippo–Endeka, based in San Marino, with which he placed fourth at the Japanese National Road Race Championships. The following year, for the 28th Asian Cycling Championships held in Tenggarong, inn Borneo, Indonesia, Sano ranked sixth in the individual time trial and fifth in the road race.

In 2010, Sano rode with Team Nippo, ranking seventh in the general classification of the Tour of Japan, third in the general classification of the Vuelta Ciclista a León, in Spain, third overall in the Tour de Kumano and second overall in the Tour de Hokkaido, both in Japan.

In 2012, he finished second in the Japanese National Time Trial Championships. Four months later, he was third in the Tour de Guadeloupe general classification. He joined Vini Fantini–Selle Italia for the 2013 season.

For the 2014 season, Sano competed with Nasu Blasen. In June 2014, he won the Japanese National Road Race Championships for the first time.

== Major results ==
2008
4th Road race, National Road Championships
2009
Asian Road Championships

5th Road race
6th Individual time trial

5th Kumamoto International Road Race
6th Overall Tour de Okinawa
8th Overall Tour of Japan
2010
2nd Overall Tour de Hokkaido
3rd Overall Vuelta Ciclista a León
3rd Overall Tour de Okinawa
4th Road race, National Road Championships
5th Kumamoto International Road Race
7th Overall Tour of Japan
10th Overall Tour de Kumano

1st Stage 2

2011
2nd Time trial, National Road Championships
3rd Overall Tour de Taiwan
3rd Overall Tour de Okinawa
3rd Japan Cup
4th Overall Tour de Hokkaido

1st Stage 3

2012
2nd Time trial, National Road Championships
3rd Overall Tour de Guadeloupe
7th Overall Tour de Kumano
7th Tour de Okinawa
9th Overall Tour of Japan
2014
National Road Championships

1st Road race
2nd Time trial

8th Overall Tour de Hokkaido
2015
5th Time trial, Asian Road Championships
2016
2nd Time trial, National Road Championships
2017
1st Tour de Okinawa
2nd Time trial, National Road Championships
2018
1st Stage 3 Tour de Kumano
2nd Road race, National Road Championships
2019
5th Overall Ronda Pilipinas
