= Kim Woo-gyeom =

South Korean cyclist (born 1995)

Personal information
- Full name: Kim Woo-gyeom
- Born: 8 February 1995 (age 31)

Cycling career
- Sport: Cycling
- Current team: Geumsan Insam Cello
- Disciplines: Road; Track
- Role: Rider

Professional team
- 2020–: Geumsan Insam Cello
Medal record
Representing South Korea
Men's track cycling
Asian Championships
Bronze medal – third place	2016 Izu	1 km time trial

Kim Woo-gyeom (born 8 February 1995) is a South Korean road and track cyclist, who currently rides for UCI Continental team Geumsan Insam Cello. He won the bronze medal in the 1 km time trial at the 2016 Asian Cycling Championships.
