= Tomokazu Fujino =

Japanese racing cyclist (born 1967)

Personal information
- Full name: Tomokazu Fujino; Japanese: 藤野智一
- Born: 25 January 1967 (age 59) Japan

Cycling career
- Sport: Cycling
- Current team: Retired
- Discipline: Road
- Role: Rider; Team manager

Professional teams
- 1993: Japan Proroad Project
- 1993–1995: Inoac–Deki
- 1996: Japan Professional Cyclist Association
- 1997: Ezak
- 1999–2002: Team Bridgestone Anchor

Managerial team
- 2008–2011: Bridgestone–Anchor

Major wins
- Japanese National Road Race Championship (1998, 1999)

Tomokazu Fujino (藤野智一, Fujino Tomokazu) (born 25 January 1967) is a Japanese former professional racing cyclist. In his active years, he represented Japan in the 1992 Summer Olympics, with his 21st-place finish in the road race being the highest for a Japanese rider to date in that event. He became Japanese national champion in the road race in 1998 and 1999 and retired in 2002.

== Major results ==
1994
1st Tour de Okinawa
1995
1st Affoltern am Albis
1997
1st Tour de Okinawa
1998
1st Road race, National Road Championships
2nd Tour de Okinawa
1999
1st Road race, National Road Championships
