= Yuka Uda =

Japanese cyclist

Personal information
- Born: 11 January 1982 Minoh, Osaka, Japan
- Died: 2 July 2010 (aged 28)

Cycling career
- Sport: Cycling
- Discipline: Road cycling

Yuka Uda (宇田 由香, Uda Yuka; 11 January 1982 – 2 July 2010) was a road cyclist from Japan. Her maiden name was Yuka Yamashima (山島由香, Yamashima Yuka). She finished second in the Japanese National Road Race Championships in 2008, and represented her nation at the 2008 UCI Road World Championships. She was diagnosed with acute myeloid leukemia in February 2009 and died of the disease on 2 July 2010.
