= Yoo Ki-hong =

South Korean bicycle racer

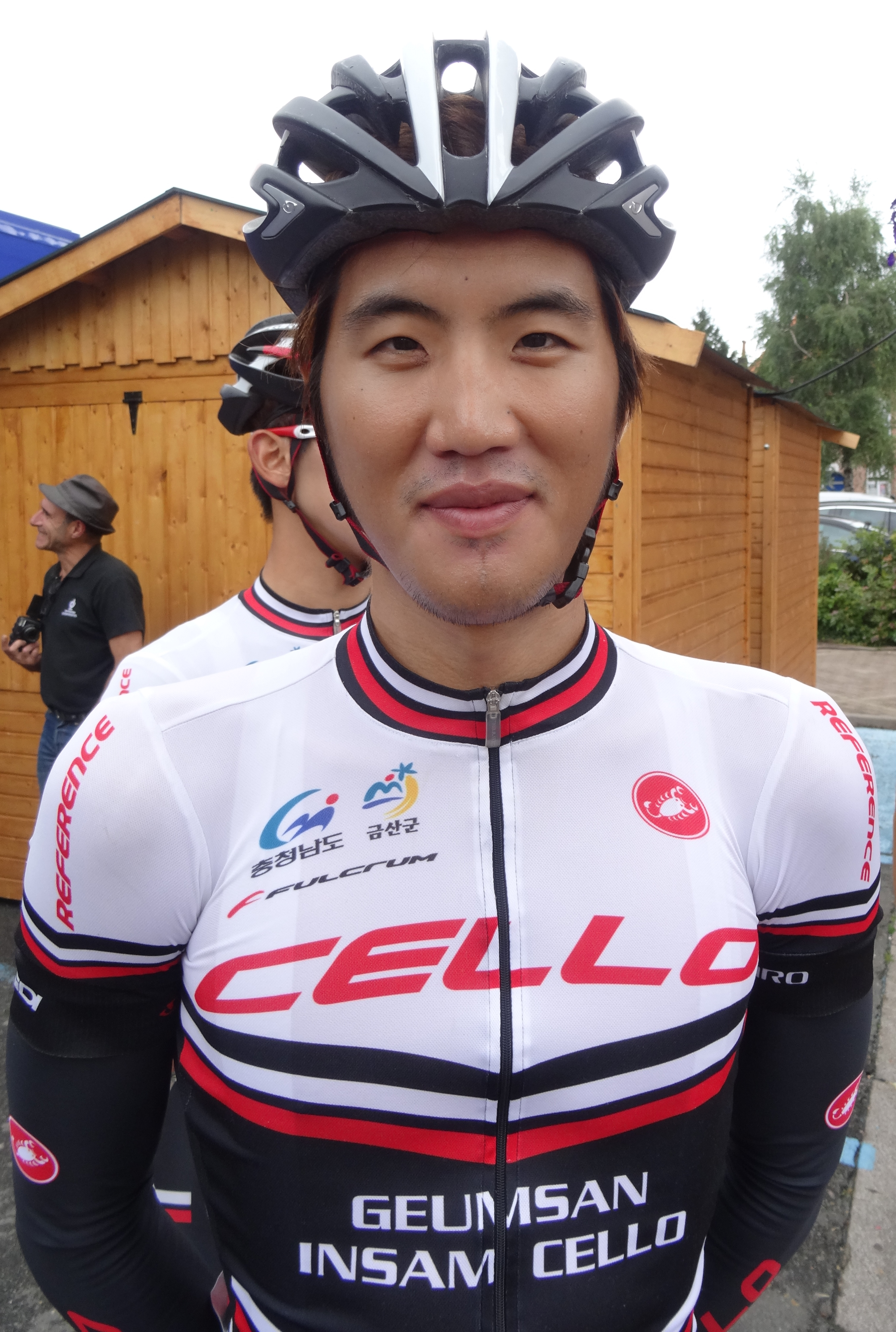
- Yoo in 2014

Personal information
- Full name: Yoo Ki-hong
- Born: March 24, 1988 (age 38) South Korea

Cycling career
- Sport: Cycling
- Current team: Retired
- Discipline: Road
- Role: Rider

Professional teams
- 2008–2009: Seoul Cycling Team
- 2010–2015: Geumsan Ginseng Asia

Yoo Ki-hong (born March 24, 1988) is a South Korean former professional cyclist.

== Major results ==
2009
1st Stage 9 Tour de Korea
2010
1st Overall Daetongryeonggi Gapyeong Stage Race

1st Stage 1

1st Stage 2 Tour de Korea
2011
1st Stage 7 Tour de Korea
