= Geumsan Insam Cello =

South Korean cycling team

Team information
- UCI code: GIC
- Registered: South Korea
- Founded: 2010
- Discipline: Road
- Status: UCI Continental Team

Key personnel
- Team manager: Choi Heedong

Team name history
- 2010–2011 2012 2013–: Geumsan Ginseng Asia; Geumsan Ginseng Cello; Geumsan Insam Cello

Geumsan Insam Cello (UCI team code: GIC) is a UCI Continental cycling team from South Korea, founded in 2010.

== Team roster ==
As of 10 February 2021.

Rider	Date of birth
Bae Jun-pyo (KOR)	17 June 2002 (age 24)
Choi Jae-woong (KOR)	28 March 1997 (age 29)
Choi Sang-jin (KOR)	27 May 2000 (age 26)
Jang Jun-hyeok (KOR)	30 May 2002 (age 24)
Jang Young-kyu (KOR)	19 October 1999 (age 26)

Rider	Date of birth
Kim Ok-cheol (KOR)	16 November 1994 (age 31)
Kim Woo-gyeom (KOR)	8 February 1995 (age 31)
Lee Jae-ha (KOR)	27 December 1996 (age 29)
Moonshin Jun-seo (KOR)	28 October 2000 (age 25)
Son Je-yong (KOR)	12 January 1994 (age 32)

== Major wins ==
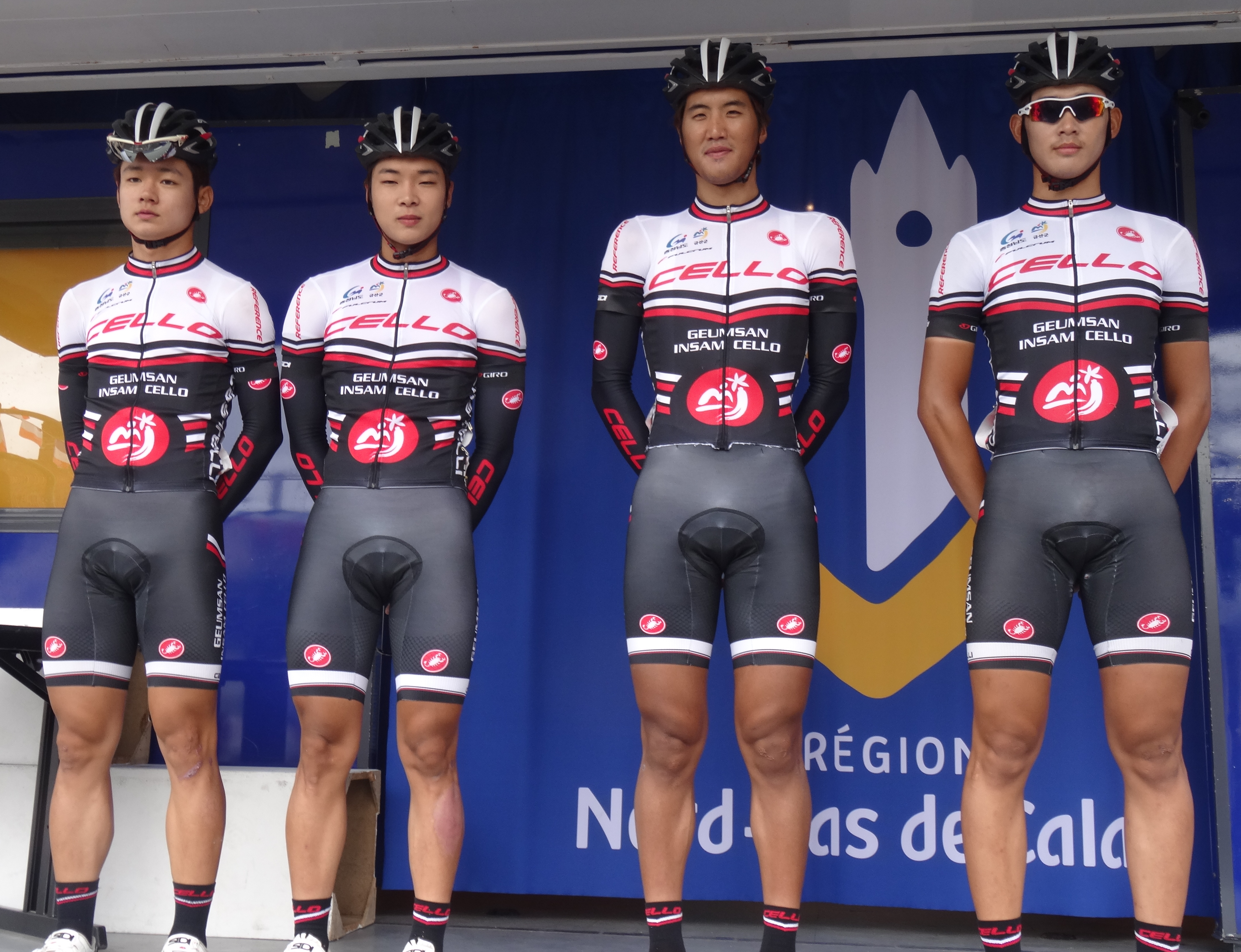
The team at the 2014 Ronde Pévéloise.

2010
Stage 5 Tour de Langkawi, Anuar Manan
Stage 2 & 3 Tour of Thailand, Anuar Manan
Stage 2 Tour de Korea, Yoo Ki-Hong
Japan Time Trial Championships, Shinichi Fukushima
Stage 2 Tour of East Java, Anuar Manan
Overall Tour de Okinawa, Shinichi Fukushima

Stage 2, Shinichi Fukushima

2011
Stage 7 Tour de Korea, Yoo Ki-Hong
South Korea Time Trial Championships, Choe Hyeong-Min
2016
South Korea Time Trial Championships, Choe Hyeong-Min
2018
Stage 1 Tour de Korea, Choe Hyeong-min

== National champions ==
2010
Japan Time Trial, Shinichi Fukushima
2011
Korean Time Trial, Choe Hyeong-Min
2016
Korean Time Trial, Choe Hyeong-Min
