= Shinichi Fukushima =

Japanese racing cyclist

Personal information
- Full name: Shinichi Fukushima
- Born: September 13, 1971 (age 55) Nagano Prefecture, Japan
- Height: 1.71 m (5 ft 7 1/2 in)
- Weight: 62 kg (137 lb; 9.8 st)

Cycling career
- Sport: Cycling
- Current team: Retired
- Discipline: Road
- Role: Rider; Directeur sportif

Professional teams
- 1996–2002: Bridgestone–Anchor
- 2002: Marlux ville de Charleroi–TT2
- 2003–2005: Bridgestone–Anchor
- 2006: Cycle Racing Team Vang
- 2007: Nippo Corporation
- 2008–2009: Meitan Honpo-GDR
- 2010: Geumsan Ginseng Asia
- 2011–2012: Terengganu Cycling Team
- 2013: Team Nippo–De Rosa

Managerial teams
- 2014–2015: Team La Pomme Marseille 13
- 2016–2018: Nippo–Vini Fantini

Major wins
- National Road Race Championships (2003); Tour of Japan (2004); National Time Trial Championships (2010)

Shinichi Fukushima (福島 晋一, Fukushima Shin'ichi; born September 13, 1971) is a Japanese former professional racing cyclist and directeur sportif, active in cycling between 1996 and 2018.

== Biography ==
Born in Nagano Prefecture, Fukushima started cycling at Shinshu University and practised road racing in the Netherlands before becoming professional with Team Bridgestone Anchor in 1996. He has competed around the world, winning races in both Asia and Europe. He became national champion in 2003 and became the first and still only Japanese to win the overall classification at the Tour of Japan in 2004. He won the overall at the 2005 Tour of Siam and became only the third Asian to win a stage at the Tour de Langkawi in 2007, where he also won the blue jersey as the best Asian rider in 2008.

With his brother Koji Fukushima, also a professional cyclist, he has been involved in the development of young riders, in part by starting the development team Bonne Chance, with the help of Daihatsu, where their father works. In 2010, at the age of 38 and even after suffering a tire puncture, Fukushima won the Japanese National Road Racing Time Trial Championship with a course record.

In October 2013, Fukushima announced that he would retire at the end of the season.

== Major results ==
1999
3rd Tour de Okinawa
2001
2nd Prix d'Armorique
2002
1st Stage 5 Tour of Japan
2nd Men's Madison Asian Games
3rd Overall Circuit de Saône-et-Loire
2003
1st Road race, National Road Championships
1st Stage 4 Tour de Hokkaido
2004
1st Overall Tour of Japan
1st GP Saint-Etienne Loire
1st Stage 2 Tour of Serbia
2nd Overall Tour of China
2nd Tour de Okinawa
3rd Overall Circuit des Ardennes

1st Stage 1

2005
1st Overall Tour of Siam

1st Stage 3

2006
1st Stage 1 Vuelta Ciclista a León
2nd Road race, Asian Road Championships
2nd Overall Tour of Siam

1st Stage 1

3rd Flèche Hesbignonne Cras Avernas
3rd Châteauroux Classic
2007
1st Stage 7 Tour de Langkawi
2nd Overall Tour de Korea

1st Stage 1

2008
1st Stage 3 Tour of Japan
2009
2nd Kumamoto International Road Race
3rd Overall Tour de Okinawa
2010
1st Time trial, National Road Championships
1st Overall Tour de Okinawa

1st Stage 2

3rd Overall Tour de Kumano
2011
1st Overall Tour de Brunei
Tour d'Indonesia

1st Stages 8 & 10

1st Stage 5 Tour de Taiwan
2012
Jelajah Malaysia

1st Stages 1 & 6
