= Kanako Nishi =

Japanese cyclist

Kanako Nishi 西加南子
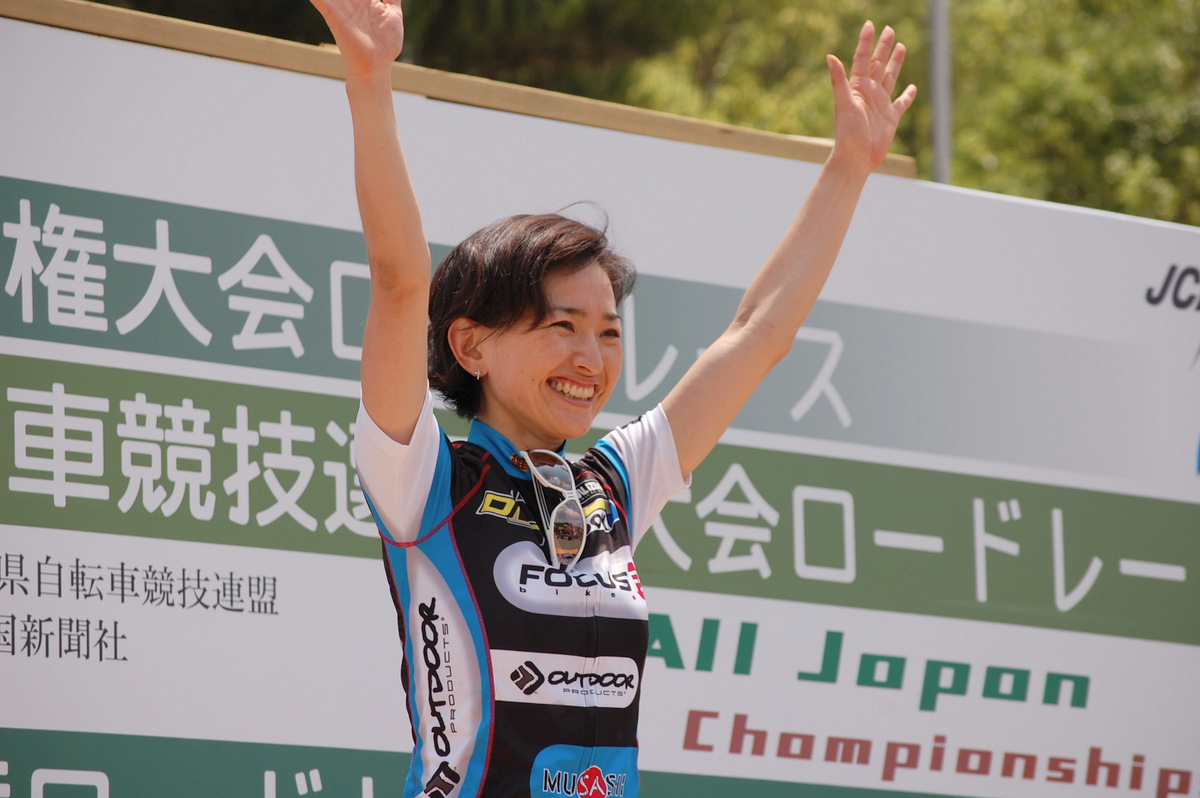
- Kanako Nishi in 2009

Personal information
- Born: 13 December 1970 (age 55) Kakegawa, Shizuoka, Japan

Cycling career
- Sport: Cycling
- Current team: Luminaria
- Discipline: Road
- Role: Rider

Major wins
- Japanese National Road Race Championships, Women, 2009

Kanako Nishi (西加南子, Nishi Kanako; born 13 December 1970, in Kakegawa, Shizuoka, Japan) is a Japanese women's racing cyclist who currently rides for Luminaria. She won the Japanese National Road Race Championships for women in 2009, the first to win the national title after Miho Oki's eleven straight victories.
