= Hiromi Kaneko =

Japanese racing cyclist (born 1980)

Personal information
- Born: 9 September 1980 (age 46)

Cycling career
- Sport: Cycling
- Discipline: Road
- Role: Rider

Amateur team
- 2021–2022: Igname Shinano Yamagata

Hiromi Kaneko (金子 広美, Kaneko Hiromi; born 9 September 1980) is a Japanese racing cyclist. She rode in the women's road race event at the 2018 UCI Road World Championships. She was selected to the 2020 Summer Olympics team, and finished in 43rd place in the women's road race.

== Major results ==
2012
3rd Road race, National Road Championships
2013
2nd Road race, National Road Championships
9th Overall Tour of Thailand
2015
National Road Championships

3rd Time trial
3rd Road race

2016
9th Road race, Asian Road Championships
2017
3rd Road race, National Road Championships
5th Overall Tour of Thailand
2018
2nd Road race, National Road Championships
2019
2nd Road race, National Road Championships
2021
2nd Road race, National Road Championships
2022
3rd Road race, National Road Championships
2023
4th Road race, National Road Championships
