= Rie Katayama =

Japanese cyclist (born 1979)

Personal information
- Full name: Rie Katayama 片山梨絵
- Born: 13 September 1979 (age 47) Suita, Japan

Cycling career
- Sport: Cycling
- Discipline: Mountain bike
- Role: Rider
- Rider type: Cross-country

Rie Katayama (片山梨絵, Katayama Rie; born 13 September 1979) is a Japanese cross-country mountain biker. At the 2008 Summer Olympics, she competed in the women's cross-country event, finishing in 20th place. At the 2012 Summer Olympics, she competed in the Women's cross-country at Hadleigh Farm, finishing in 20th place again. In October 2012, she announced she would be retiring as a professional cyclist.
