= Yasutaka Tashiro =

Japanese cyclist (born 1974)

Personal information
- Full name: Yasutaka Tashiro; Japanese: 田代 恭崇
- Born: June 7, 1974 (age 52) Japan
- Height: 168 cm (5 ft 6 in)

Cycling career
- Sport: Cycling
- Current team: Retired
- Discipline: Road

Professional team
- 1998–2007: Bridgestone–Anchor

Yasutaka Tashiro (田代 恭崇, Tashiro Yasutaka; born 7 June 1974, in Tokyo) is a retired Japanese professional racing cyclist. After graduating from Josai University, Tashiro turned professional and rode in Europe and Asia, mostly for the Bridgestone Anchor team. He was twice national champion, and also represented Japan in the 2004 Summer Olympics. He retired in 2007. He is now an employee of Bridgestone.

== Major results ==
2001
1st Road race, National Road Championships
2002
1st Stage 5 Tour de Hokkaido
2003
1st Prix d'Amourique
2004
1st Road race, National Road Championships
2005
1st Tour de Okinawa
2006
Tour de Taiwan

1st Stages 4 & 6
