= Takashi Miyazawa =

Japanese cyclist

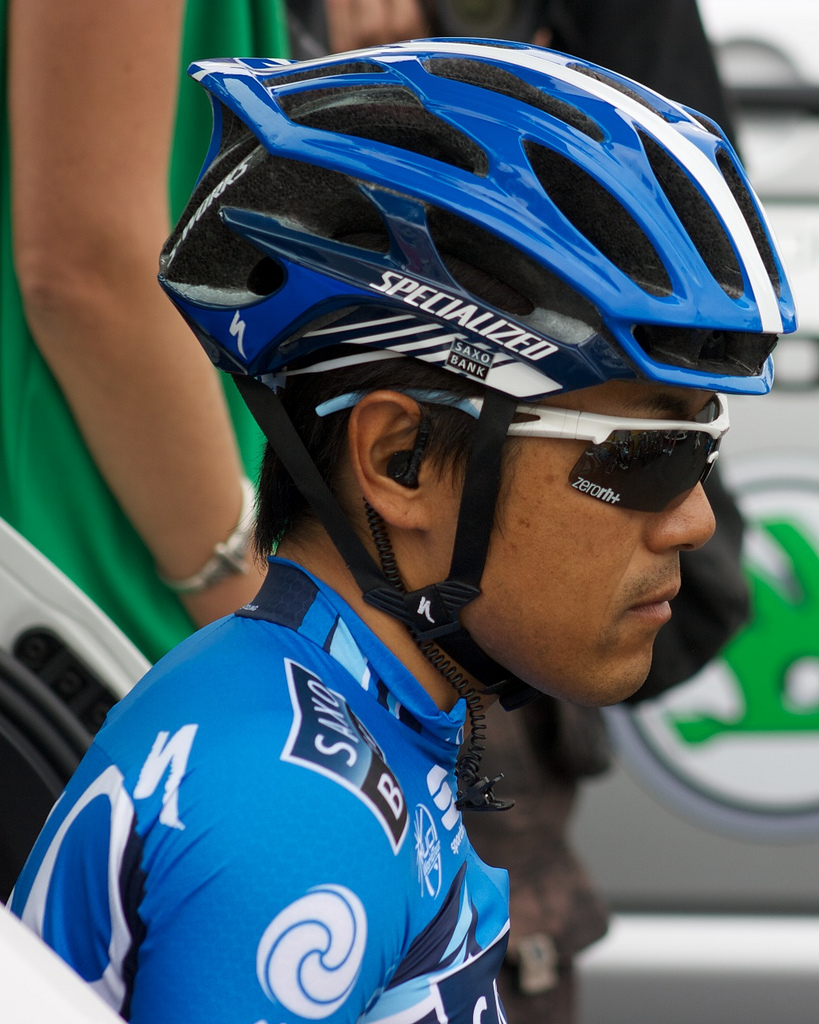
- Miyazawa at the 2012 Tour Down Under.

Personal information
- Full name: Takashi Miyazawa; Japanese: 宮澤崇史
- Born: 27 February 1978 (age 48) Japan
- Height: 1.65 m (5 ft 5 in)
- Weight: 60 kg (132 lb; 9 st 6 lb)

Cycling career
- Sport: Cycling
- Current team: Leomo Bellmare
- Discipline: Road
- Role: Rider (retired); Team manager
- Rider type: Sprinter

Amateur team
- 2015–2019: Lemonade Bellmare

Professional teams
- 2003: Team Bridgestone Anchor
- 2005: Team Bridgestone Anchor
- 2006: Cycle Racing Team Vang
- 2007: Nippo Corporation
- 2008: Meitan Honpo-GDR
- 2009: Amica Chips
- 2009: EQA-Meitan Honpo
- 2010: CDC–Cavaliere
- 2011: Farnese Vini–Neri Sottoli
- 2012–2013: Team Saxo Bank
- 2014: Vini Fantini–Nippo

Managerial team
- 2015–: Lemonade Bellmare

Major wins
- National Road Race Championships (2010); Asian Cycling Championship (2007); Tour de Hokkaido (2008, 2009)

Takashi Miyazawa (宮澤崇史, Miyazawa Takashi) (born 27 February 1978 in Nagano City) is a Japanese former professional racing cyclist, who competed as a professional between 2003 and 2014.

== Career ==
Miyazawa had a varied early career, riding cyclocross at first, then participating on various teams in Japan, Italy, and France, and even riding independently at times. He once quit road cycling to participate in the keirin school. Finally settling on road cycling with Bridgestone Anchor in 2005, Miyazawa quickly established himself as one of Japan's top sprinters, reaching the podium not only in Japan, but in Asia and Europe as well. He was Asian champion in 2007 and represented Japan in the 2008 Summer Olympics. He was hired by the UCI Professional Continental team Amica Chips-Knauf in 2009 but returned to his Japanese team when Amica Chips floundered due to financial difficulties. Joining Team Nippo in 2010, he won the Japanese national championship that year. On 28 October 2010, it was announced that Miyazawa had signed to ride with the new Italian Pro Continental team, Farnese Vini–Neri Sottoli, for the 2011 season. On 21 October 2011, it was announced that Miyazawa signed a one-year contract with UCI World Tour team Team Saxo Bank for the 2012 season.

For the 2014 season, Miyazawa rejoined Vini Fantini–Nippo, but announced his retirement at the end of that season. After his retirement, he assumed the post of manager of the Lemonade Bellmare cycling team.

== Major results ==
2006
1st Tour de Okinawa
1st Stage 4 Tour of Siam
1st Stage 2 Tour de Hokkaido
5th Flèche Hesbignonne
7th Japan Cup
2007
1st Road race, Asian Road Championships
1st Tour de Okinawa
1st Stage 1 Tour of Japan
2nd Ronde van Overijssel
2nd Circuito de Getxo
3rd Road race, National Road Championships
6th Overall Vuelta Ciclista a León
6th Tro-Bro Léon
8th Grand Prix de Rennes
9th Châteauroux Classic
10th Japan Cup
2008
1st Overall Tour de Hokkaido

1st Points classification

3rd Road race, Asian Road Championships
3rd Overall Tour de Taiwan
6th Grand Prix de Rennes
2009
1st Overall Tour de Hokkaido

1st Stages 1 (TTT) & 5

2nd Road race, National Road Championships
4th Circuito de Getxo
10th Châteauroux Classic
2010
1st Road race, National Road Championships
1st Kumamoto International Road Race
1st Stage 2 Vuelta Ciclista a León
2nd Road race, Asian Games
2nd Road race, Asian Road Championships
2nd Overall Tour de Kumano

1st Prologue

4th Overall Tour de Taiwan

1st Stages 3 & 4

6th Japan Cup
7th Overall Tour de Okinawa
2011
1st Izegem Koerse
5th Paris–Brussels
6th Road race, Asian Road Championships
6th Gran Premio Nobili Rubinetterie
2012
5th Overall Tour de Picardie
2013
5th Grand Prix de Denain
2014
4th Road race, Asian Road Championships
5th GP Izola
7th Road race, Asian Games

== Personal life ==
In 2001, Miyazawa donated half his liver to his mother, who was suffering from cirrhosis of the liver.
