= Osamu Sumida =

Japanese cyclist

Personal information
- Born: 14 October 1969 (age 57)

Cycling career
- Sport: Cycling

Osamu Sumida (住田 修, Sumida Osamu; born 14 October 1969) is a Japanese cyclist. He competed in the men's individual road race at the 1996 Summer Olympics.
