= Akemi Morimoto =

Japanese cyclist

Personal information
- Born: 22 February 1968 (age 58)

Cycling career
- Sport: Cycling

Akemi Morimoto (森本 朱美, Morimoto Akemi; born 22 February 1968) is a Japanese former cyclist. She competed in the women's points race at the 2000 Summer Olympics.
