= Shimano Racing Team =

Japanese cycling team

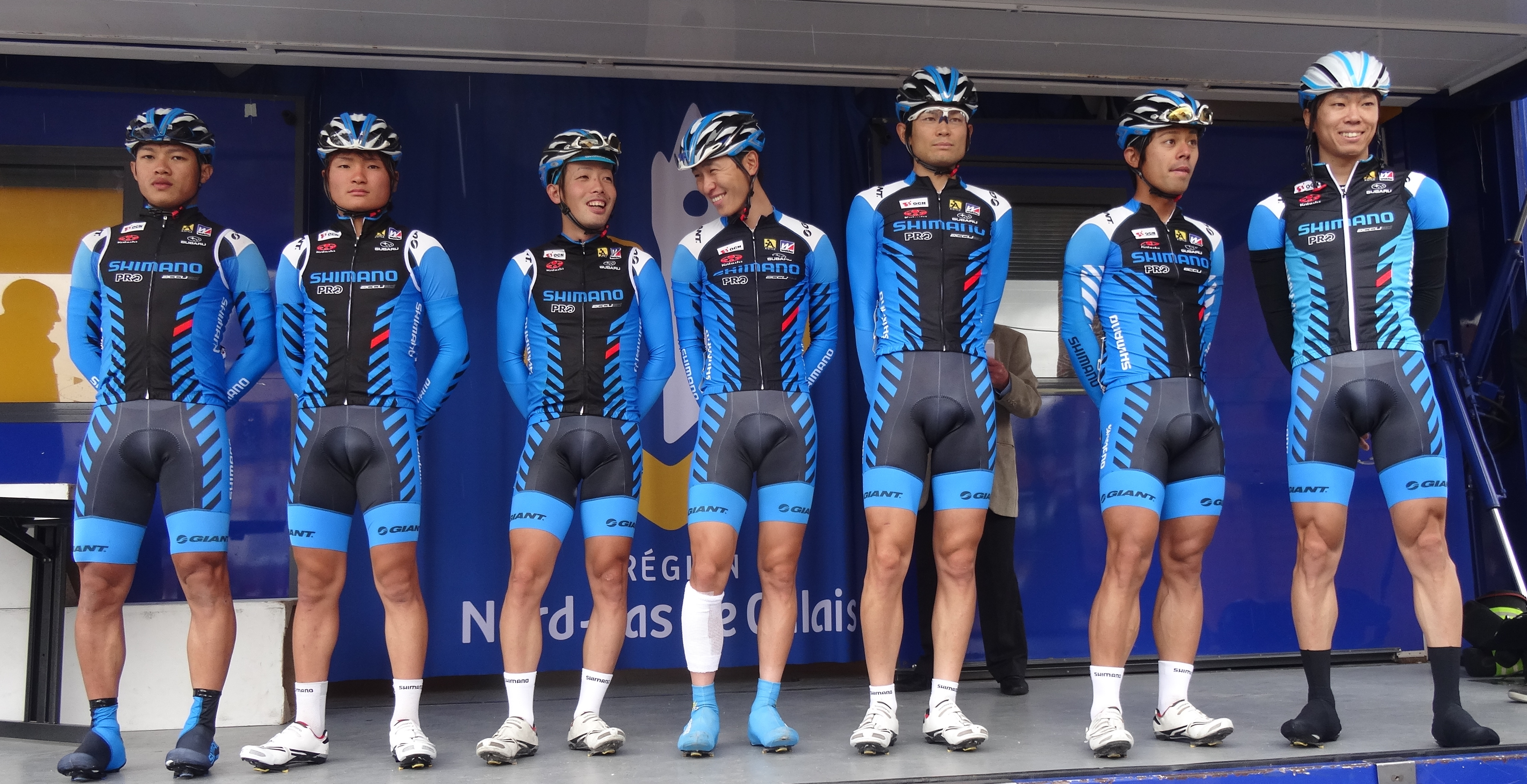

Team information
- UCI code: SMN
- Registered: Japan
- Founded: 2009
- Discipline: Road
- Status: UCI Continental
- Website: Team home page

Key personnel
- General manager: Hisafumi Imanishi
- Team manager: Hidenori Nodera

Team name history
- 2009–: Shimano Racing Team

Shimano Racing Team (シマノレーシング) is a Japanese UCI Continental cycling team established in 2009. It traces its history back to 1973.

== Team roster ==
As of 24 February 2021.

Rider	Date of birth
Shogo Ichimaru (JPN)	4 January 1992 (age 34)
Shoma Kazama (JPN)	22 May 1996 (age 30)
Keisuke Kimura (JPN)	15 December 1991 (age 34)
Ryo Minato (JPN)	12 April 1992 (age 34)
Tadaaki Nakai (JPN)	12 December 1996 (age 29)

Rider	Date of birth
Takuya Nakata (JPN)	3 June 1996 (age 30)
Takahiko Ogata (JPN)	5 December 1998 (age 27)
Jo Shigemitsu (JPN)	30 May 1998 (age 28)
Ryota Tokoi (JPN)	11 December 1998 (age 27)
Kota Yokoyama (JPN)	20 August 1995 (age 31)

== Major wins ==
2009
Stage 4 Tour de Taiwan, Shinri Suzuki
Stage 6 Tour de Hokkaido, Shinri Suzuki
2010
Stage 4 Tour of Japan, Shinri Suzuki
2011
Stage 1 Tour de Hokkaido, Hayato Yoshida
Taiwan Cup, Kazuki Aoyanagi
Stage 2 Tour de Okinawa, Yusuke Hatanaka
2013
Stage 7 Tour de Taiwan, Hayato Yoshida
2014
Japan National Under-23 Cyclo-Cross Championships, Kota Yokoyama
2017
Stage 1 Tour de Kumano, Shōtarō Iribe
2018
Stage 2 The Princess Maha Chackri Sirindhorn's Cup "Tour of Thailand", Shotaro Iribe
Stage 2 Tour de Kumano, Shotaro Iribe
2019
Road Race, National Road Championships, Shōtarō Iribe
2023
Time Trial, Japan National Under-23 Road Championships, Yoshiki Terada
2024
Tour of Japan

Points classification, Yoshiki Terada
Mountains classification, Tadaaki Nakai
