= Astemo Utsunomiya Blitzen =

Japanese cycling team

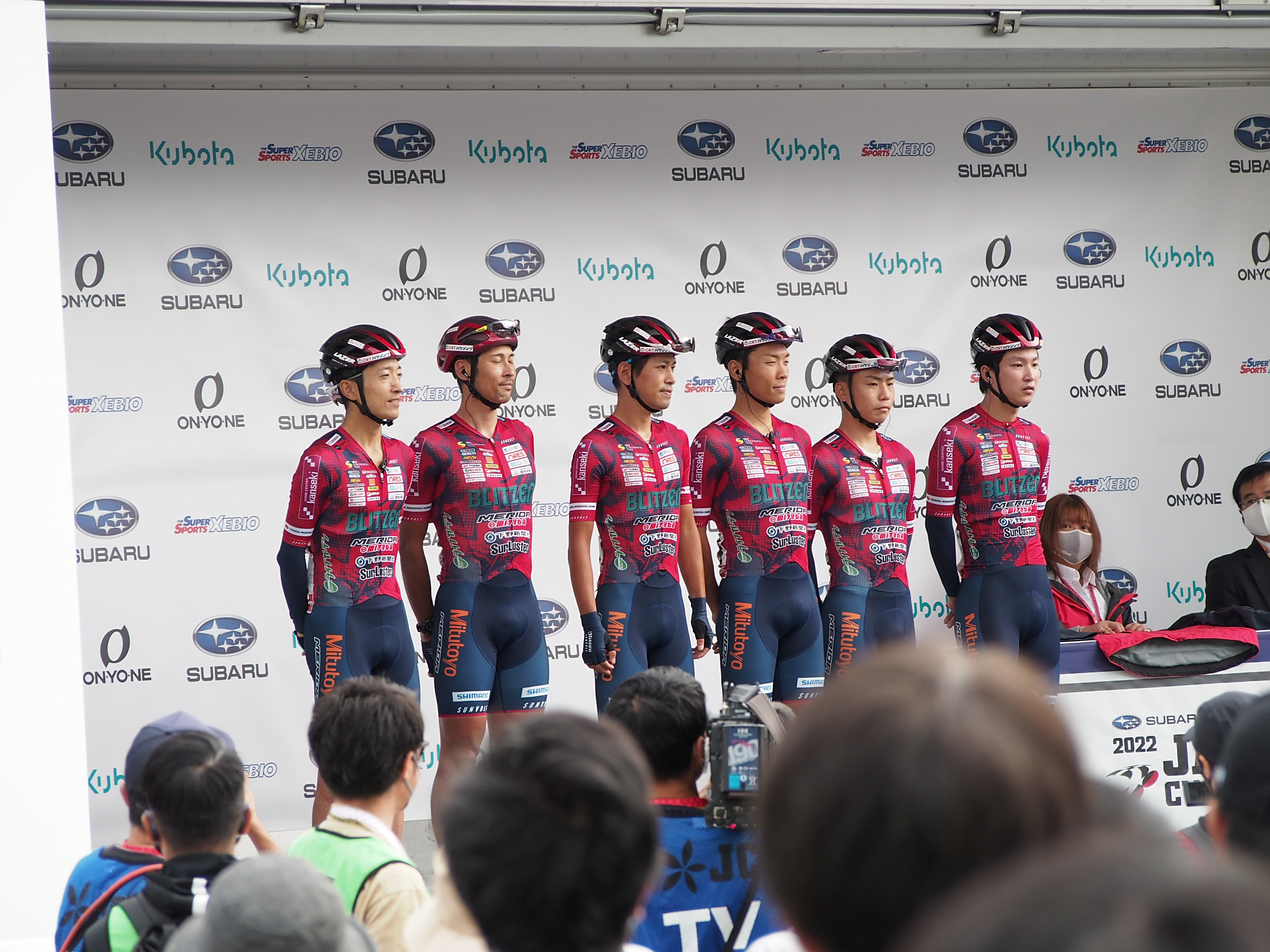
- The team at the 2022 Japan Cup

Team information
- UCI code: ABZ
- Registered: Japan
- Founded: 2009
- Discipline: Road
- Status: UCI Continental
- Website: Team home page

Key personnel
- General manager: Yoshimasa Hirose
- Team manager: Yasutaka Tashiro

Team name history
- 2009 2010–2025 2025–: Blitzen Utsunomiya Pro Racing (BLZ); Utsunomiya Blitzen (BLZ); Astemo Utsunomiya Blitzen (ABZ)

Astemo Utsunomiya Blitzen (Astemo宇都宮ブリッツェン, Astemo Utsunomiya Burittsen) is a Japanese UCI Continental cycling team. It was established in 2009 with a home base in Utsunomiya, Tochigi, the location of the Japan Cup cycling race.

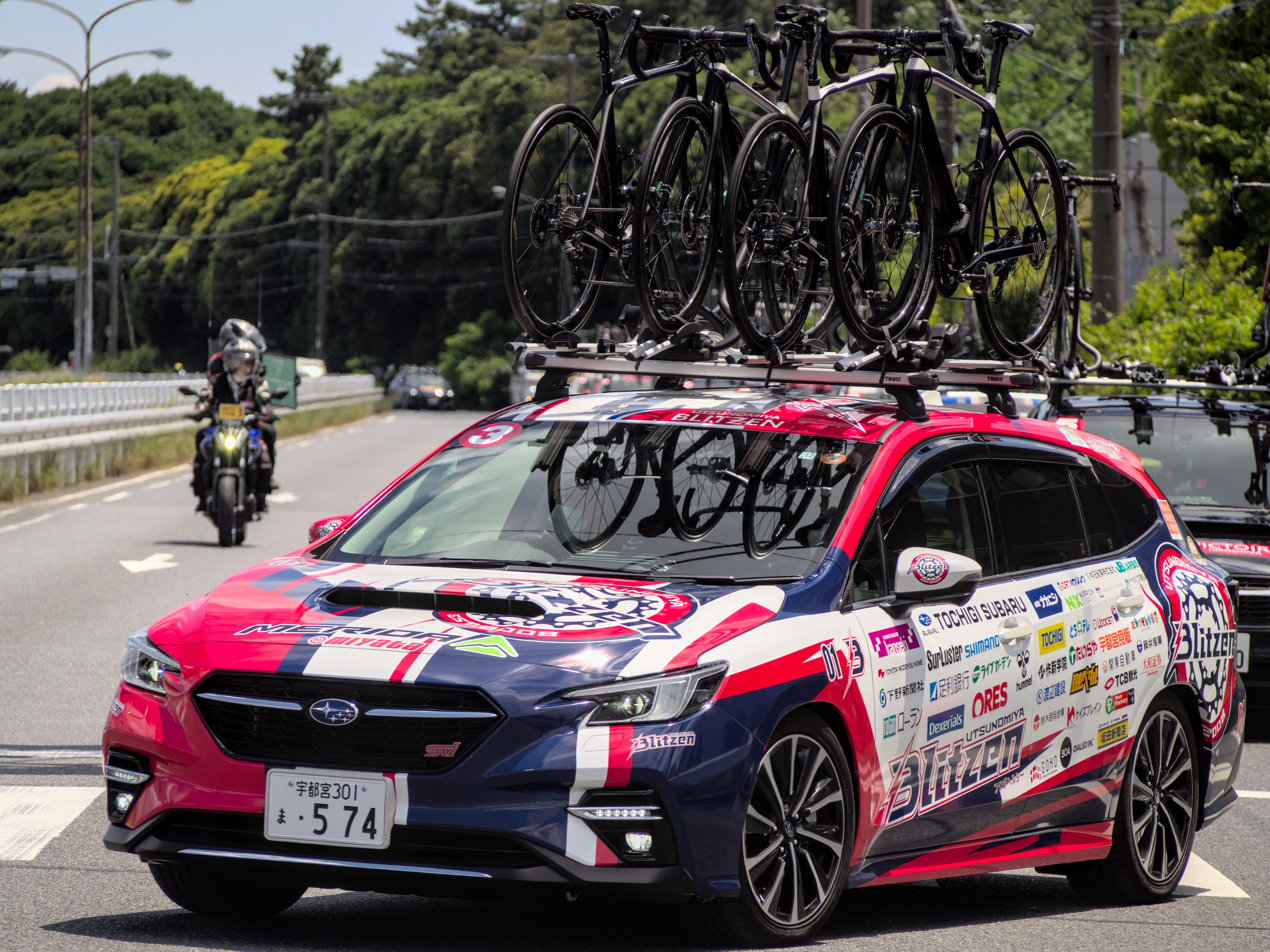
A team car at the 2022 Tour of Japan

== Team roster ==
As of 15 September 2026.

Rider	Date of birth
Ao Akimoto (JPN)	10 March 2007 (age 19)
Raimu Aso (JPN)	10 February 2005 (age 21)
Chun Kai Feng (TWN)	2 November 1988 (age 37)
Nariyuki Masuda (JPN)	23 October 1983 (age 42)
Taishi Miyazaki (JPN)	5 September 1999 (age 27)
Atsushi Oka (JPN)	3 September 1995 (age 31)

Rider	Date of birth
Toki Sawada (JPN)	12 January 1994 (age 32)
Aira Sugeno (JPN)	1 April 2004 (age 22)
Kosuke Takeyama (JPN)	22 November 1997 (age 28)
Junsei Tani (JPN)	4 August 1994 (age 32)
Sergio Tu (TWN)	24 February 1997 (age 29)

== Major wins ==
2010
Stage 1 Tour de Kumano, Yoshimitsu Tsuji
2014
Tour de Okinawa, Nariyuki Masuda
2016
Overall Tour de Hokkaido, Nariyuki Masuda

Stage 2, Nariyuki Masuda

Prologue Tour de Kumano, Takayuki Abe
Stage 3 Tour de Kumano, Jin Okubo
Tour de Okinawa, Nariyuki Masuda
2017
U23 Asian Time Trial Cycling Championships, Rei Onodera
Points classification Tour de Kumano, Takayuki Abe
2018
Mountains classification Tour of Japan, Yuzuru Suzuki

Stage 2, Takeaki Amezawa

Prologue Tour de Kumano, Takayuki Abe
2019
Prologue Tour of Japan, Atsushi Oka
Japan National Time Trial Championships, Nariyuki Masuda
Tour de Okinawa, Nariyuki Masuda
2021
Overall Tour of Japan, Nariyuki Masuda

Stage 1, Nariyuki Masuda
Mountains classification, Nariyuki Masuda

2022
Young rider classification Tour of Japan, Taishi Miyazaki
2025
Points classification Tour of Japan, Atsushi Oka

Stage 2, Atsushi Oka

Tour de Okinawa, Atsushi Oka
