= Japanese National Road Race Championships =

National road cycling championship in Japan

The Japanese National Road Race Championships are conducted every year under the auspices of the Japan Cycling Federation.

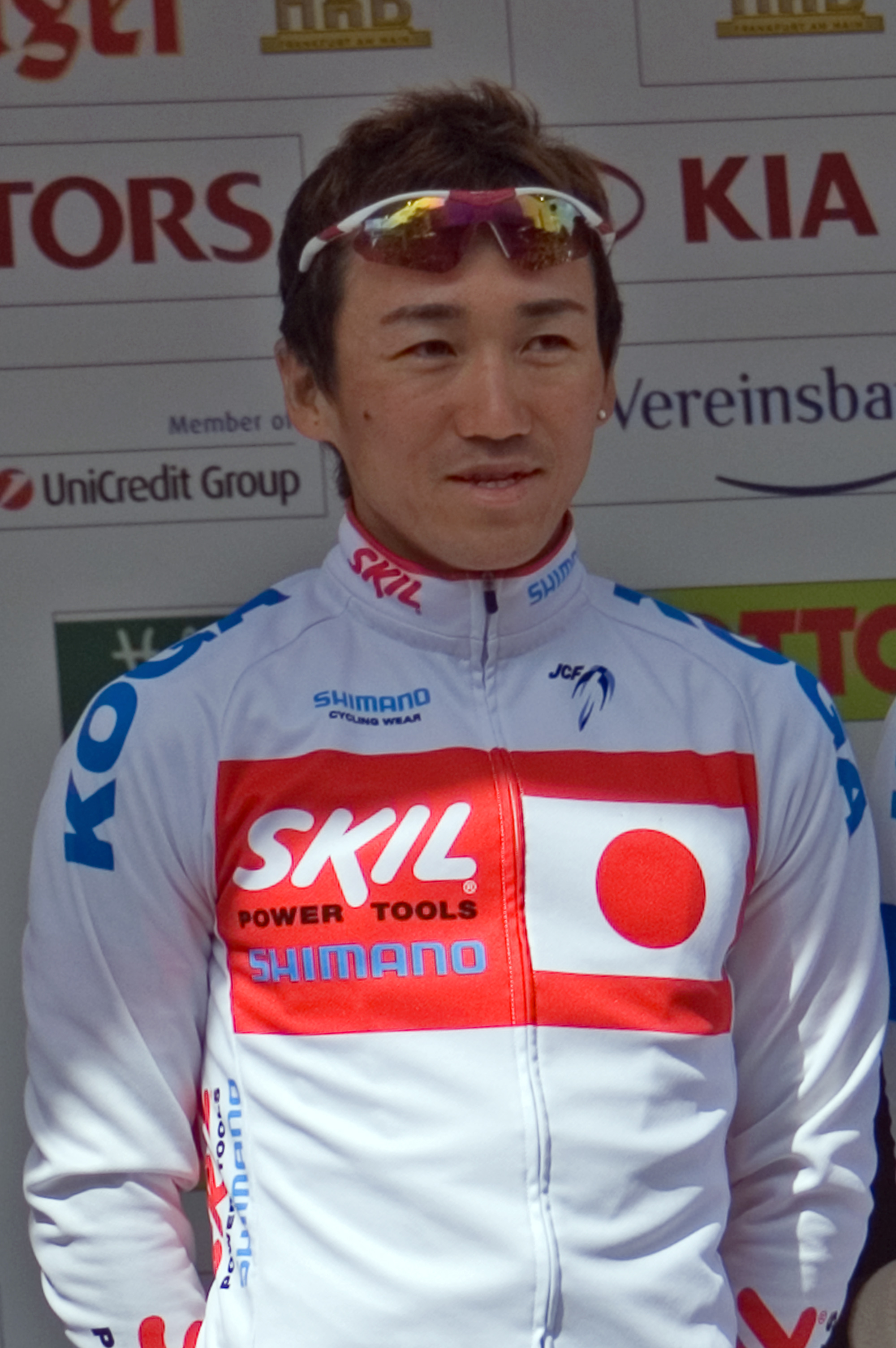
Hidenori Nodera, wearing the Japanese champion's jersey in 2006

== Men ==
=== Elite ===
Year	Gold	Silver	Bronze
1998	Tomokazu Fujino	Yoshiyuki Abe	Kazuyuki Manabe
1999	Tomokazu Fujino	Junichi Shibuya	Osamu Sumida
2000	Yoshiyuki Abe	Osamu Sumida	Kazuya Okazaki
2001	Yasutaka Tashiro	Mitsuteru Tanaka	Tomoya Kano
2002	Shinri Suzuki	Kazuya Okazaki	Junichi Shibuya
2003	Shinichi Fukushima	Hidenori Nodera	Kazuyuki Manabe
2004	Yasutaka Tashiro	Shinri Suzuki	Hidenori Nodera
2005	Hidenori Nodera	Yasutaka Tashiro	Kazuyuki Manabe
2006	Fumiyuki Beppu	Hidenori Nodera	Shinri Suzuki
2007	Yukiya Arashiro	Hidenori Nodera	Takashi Miyazawa
2008	Hidenori Nodera	Kazuo Inoue	Shinichi Fukushima
2009	Taiji Nishitani	Takashi Miyazawa	Hidenori Nodera
2010	Takashi Miyazawa	Shinri Suzuki	Hidenori Nodera
2011	Fumiyuki Beppu	Yukiya Arashiro	Miyataka Shimizu
2012	Yukihiro Doi	Nariyuki Masuda	Miyataka Shimizu
2013	Yukiya Arashiro	Miyataka Shimizu	Nariyuki Masuda
2014	Junya Sano	Kazuo Inoue	Genki Yamamoto
2015	Kazushige Kuboki	Yusuke Hatanaka	Nariyuki Masuda
2016	Sho Hatsuyama	Ryota Nishizono	Keisuke Kimura
2017	Yusuke Hatanaka	Fumiyuki Beppu	Keisuke Kimura
2018	Genki Yamamoto	Junya Sano	Yudai Arashiro
2019	Shōtarō Iribe	Yukiya Arashiro	Kohei Yokotsuka
2020	No race due to the COVID-19 pandemic in Japan		
2021	Keigo Kusaba	Nariyuki Masuda	Hideto Nakane
2022	Yukiya Arashiro	Yudai Arashiro	Masaki Yamamoto
2023	Masaki Yamamoto	Atsushi Oka	Genki Yamamoto
2024	Marino Kobayashi	Sohei Kaneko	Masaki Yamamoto
2025	Marino Kobayashi	Genki Yamamoto	Sohei Kaneko

=== U23 ===
Year	Gold	Silver	Bronze
2005	Yukiya Arashiro	Makoto Nakamura	Daichi Nemoto
2006			
2007	Jumpei Murakami	Futoshi Morisawa	Masakazu Ito
2008			
2009	Eiichi Hirai	Takashi Nakayama	Yu Takenouchi
2010	Genki Yamamoto	Kosuke Harakawa	Masanori Noguchi
2011	Genki Yamamoto	Masaki Amemiya	Keisuke Nakao
2012	Yasumasa Adachi	Toshiki Omote	Chikara Wada
2013	Tanzō Tokuda	Hiroki Nishimura	Genki Yamamoto
2014	Tanzō Tokuda	Suguru Tokuda	Tokuma Akita
2015	Michimasa Nakai	Saya Kuroeda	Hayato Okamoto
2016	Marino Kobayashi	Suguru Tokuda	Yūsuke Matsumoto
2017	Kota Yokoyama	Sora Nomoto	Masaki Yamamoto
2018	Masahiro Ishigami	Shoi Matsuda	Kakeru Omae
2019	Kosuke Takeyama	Keitaro Sawada	Shunsuke Imamura
2020	No race due to the COVID-19 pandemic in Japan		
2021	Naoki Kojima	Tetsuo Yamamoto	Yoshiki Terada
2022	Kazutoshi Kariya	Seiya Iwata	Hiryu Kayama
2023	Koki Kamada	Yugi Tsuda	Hayato Uwano
2024	Yoshiki Terada	Koki Kamada	George Matsui
2025	Toa Morita	Jo Hashikawa	George Matsui

== Women ==
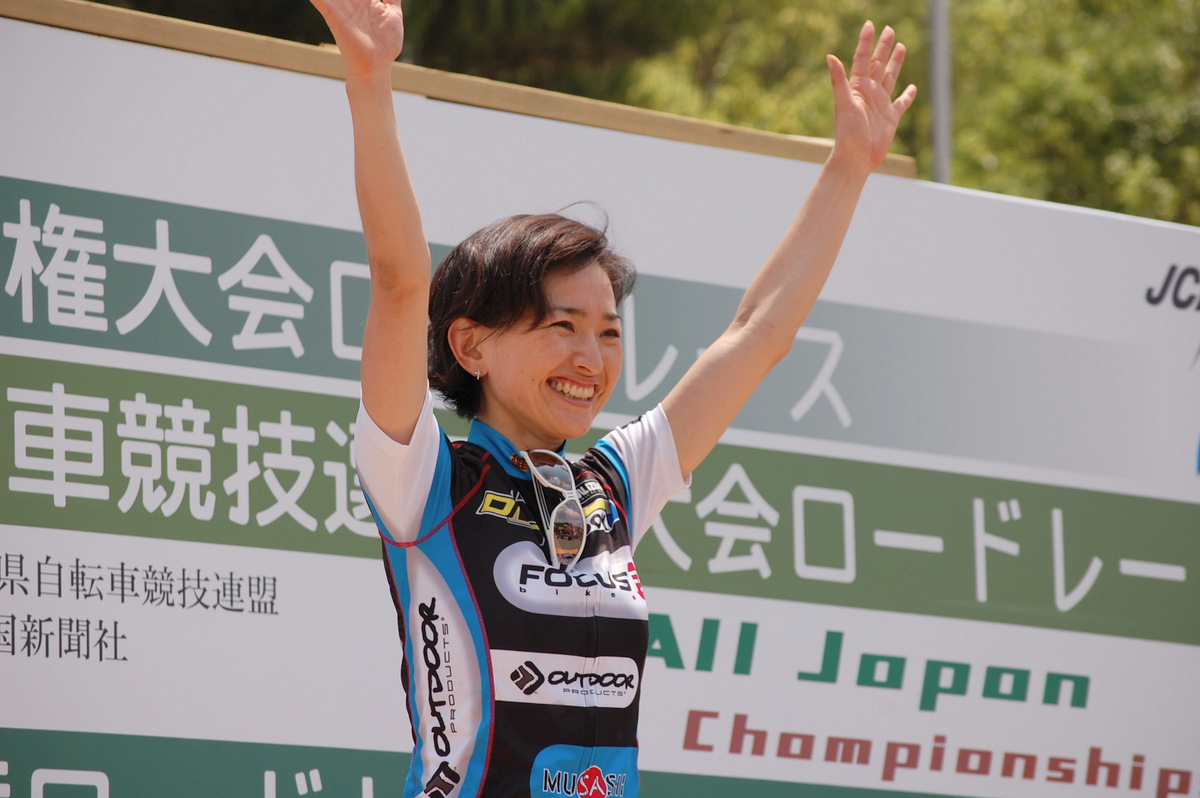
Kanako Nishi

Year	Gold	Silver	Bronze
1998	Miho Oki	Ayumu Otsuka	Kaori Sakashita
1999	Miho Oki	Ayumu Otsuka	Akemi Morimoto
2000	Miho Oki	Akemi Morimoto	Kanako Nishi
2001	Miho Oki	Akemi Morimoto	Tamamo Nakamura
2002	Miho Oki	Miyoko Karami	Ayumu Otsuka
2003	Miho Oki	Akemi Morimoto	Hiroko Nambu
2004	Miho Oki	Miyoko Karami	Akemi Morimoto
2005	Miho Oki	Miyoko Karami	Masami Mashimo
2006	Miho Oki	Mayuko Hagiwara	Satomi Wadami
2007	Miho Oki	Ayako Toyooka	Masami Mashimo
2008	Miho Oki	Yuka Yamashima	Mayuko Hagiwara
2009	Kanako Nishi	Akemi Morimoto	Rie Katayama
2010	Mayuko Hagiwara	Kanako Nishi	Rie Katayama
2011	Mayuko Hagiwara	Rie Katayama	Kanako Nishi
2012	Mayuko Hagiwara	Eri Yonamine	Hiromi Kaneko
2013	Eri Yonamine	Hiromi Kaneko	Mayuko Hagiwara
2014	Mayuko Hagiwara	Eri Yonamine	Yumiko Gōda
2015	Mayuko Hagiwara	Eri Yonamine	Hiromi Kaneko
2016	Eri Yonamine	Mayuko Hagiwara	Yūmi Kajihara
2017	Eri Yonamine	Miyoko Karami	Hiromi Kaneko
2018	Eri Yonamine	Hiromi Kaneko	Tsubasa Makise
2019	Eri Yonamine	Hiromi Kaneko	Shoko Kashiki
2020	No race due to the COVID-19 pandemic in Japan		
2021	Miki Uetake	Hiromi Kaneko	Urara Kawaguchi
2022	Shoko Kashiki	Eri Yonamine	Hiromi Kaneko
2023	Eri Yonamine	Tsubasa Makise	Akari Kobayashi
2024	Eri Yonamine	Yurina Kinoshita	Yui Ishida
2025	Akari Kobayashi	Akari Kawada	Yoshiko Ishii

== See also ==
- Japanese National Time Trial Championships
