= Junya Tashiro =

Japanese fashion designer

- Born: 1974 (age 51–52)
- Occupation: fashion designer

Junya Tashiro (born 1974 in Saga Prefecture, Japan) is a Japanese fashion designer based in Fukuoka City. Tashiro creates women's apparel (mainly dresses and skirts) as well as handbags and ladies' accessories. Tashiro often works in natural fabrics such as linen in earthy colors. He has presented his fashion creations in Japan Fashion Week in Tokyo.
