= Kumamoto International Road Race =

Race details
- Region: Japan
- Discipline: Road race
- Competition: UCI Asia Tour
- Type: One day race
- Web site: kumamoto-road.net

History
- First edition: 2009
- Editions: 2
- Final edition: 2010
- First winner: Yasuharu Nakajima (JPN)
- Most wins: No repeat winners
- Final winner: Takashi Miyazawa (JPN)

The Kumamoto International Road Race was a professional cycling race held annually in Japan. It was part of UCI Asia Tour in category 1.2.

== Winners ==
| Year | Country | Rider | Team |
|---|---|---|---|
| 2009 | Japan | Yasuharu Nakajima | |
| 2010 | Japan | Takashi Miyazawa | Team Nippo |
