= Tour de Okinawa =

Japanese one-day road cycling race

Race details
- Date: November
- Region: Okinawa Prefecture, Japan
- Local name: ツール・ド・おきなわ
- Discipline: Road
- Competition: UCI Asia Tour 1.2
- Type: Classic one-day race
- Organiser: Japan Cycling Federation
- Web site: tour-de-okinawa.jp/english/

History
- First edition: 1989
- Editions: 34 (as of 2025)
- First winner: Kazuo Ōishi (JPN)
- Most wins: Wong Kam-po (HKG) (4 wins)
- Most recent: Atsushi Oka (JPN)

The Tour de Okinawa (ツール・ド・おきなわ, Tsūru do Okinawa) is an annual professional road bicycle racing classic one-day race held in Okinawa Prefecture, Japan. It was first started in 1989 as an amateur race, but became professional in 1999. It became part of the UCI Asia Tour in 2005. Until 2007, it was a one-day race, billing itself as the longest single-day course in Japan, but was transformed into a two-day stage race in 2008, its UCI category changing from 1.2 to 2.2. In 2008, the first day was a criterium, but from 2009, it was changed to a time trial run on the streets of Nago. The 2010 edition extended the second stage to 210 kilometers. The 2012 edition again returned to a single-day event.

In addition to the main international champion race, there is also a women's and junior international race, as well as several amateur races.

== Past winners ==
=== Men's winners ===
Year	Country	Rider	Team
1989	Japan	Kazuo Ōishi	
1990	Japan	Kyōshi Miura	
1991	Japan	Takahiro Yamada	
1992	Italy	Gianluca Tarocco	
1993	Japan	Takahiro Yamada	
1994	Japan	Tomokazu Fujino	
1995	Hong Kong	Wong Kam-po	
1996	Japan	Ken Hashikawa	
1997	Japan	Tomokazu Fujino	
1998	Hong Kong	Wong Kam-po	
1999	Canada	Mark Walters	Canada (national team)
2000	Hong Kong	Wong Kam-po	Hong Kong (national team)
2001	Japan	Makoto Iijima	Sumita Ravanello Pearl Izumi
2002	Australia	Paul Redenbach	Giant Asia Racing Team
2003	Japan	Kazuya Okazaki	Team Nippon Hodo
2004	Hong Kong	Wong Kam-po	Hong Kong (national team)
2005	Japan	Yasutaka Tashiro	Team Bridgestone Anchor
2006	Japan	Takashi Miyazawa	Cycle Racing Team Vang
2007	Japan	Takashi Miyazawa	Nippo Corporation-Meitan Hompo co. LTD-Asada
2008	Japan	Yukiya Arashiro	Meitan Hompo-GDR
2009	Japan	Kenji Itami	Bridgestone–Anchor
2010	Japan	Shinichi Fukushima	Geumsan Ginseng Asia
2011	Japan	Kazuhiro Mori	Aisan Racing Team
2012	Australia	Thomas Palmer	Drapac Cycling
2013	Japan	Sho Hatsuyama	Bridgestone–Anchor
2014	Japan	Nariyuki Masuda	Utsunomiya Blitzen
2015	New Zealand	Jason Christie	Avanti Racing Team
2016	Japan	Nariyuki Masuda	Utsunomiya Blitzen
2017	Japan	Junya Sano	Matrix Powertag
2018	Italy	Alan Marangoni	Nippo–Vini Fantini–Europa Ovini
2019	Japan	Nariyuki Masuda	Utsunomiya Blitzen
2020	No race due to COVID-19 pandemic		
2021	No race due to COVID-19 pandemic		
2022	Spain	Benjamín Prades	Team UKYO
2023	Japan	Masaki Yamamoto	JCL Team UKYO
2024	No race due to bad weather		
2025	Japan	Atsushi Oka	Astemo Utsunomiya Blitzen

=== Women's winners ===
Year	Country	Rider	Team
1989			
2008	Taiwan	Ke Xin Zeng	
2009	Hong Kong	Wan Yiu Jamie Wong	Giant Pro Cycling
2010	United States	Carmen Small	Colavita–Baci p/b Cooking Light
2011	Taiwan	Ho Hsiung Huang	
2012	Japan	Eri Yonamine	
2013	China	Dongyan Huang	China Chongming–Giant Pro Cycling
2014	Japan	Hiromi Kaneko	
2015	Taiwan	Huang Ting-ying	
2016	Taiwan	Huang Ting-ying	Servetto Footon
2017	Netherlands	Ellen van Dijk	WTC de Amstel
2018	Japan	Eri Yonamine	Wiggle High5
2019	Taiwan	Ke Xin Zeng	Chinese Taipei (national team)
2020	No race due to COVID-19 pandemic		
2021	No race due to COVID-19 pandemic		
2022	Japan	Hiromi Kaneko	Igname Shinano Yamagata
2023	South Korea	Ah-reum Na	High Ambition 2022 jp
2024	No race due to bad weather		
2025	Japan	Etsuko Tezuka	IME Racing
