= 2013 Tour de Langkawi =

2012–13 UCI Asia Tour, race 10 of 32

Race details
- Dates: 21 February–2 March 2013
- Stages: 10
- Distance: 1,469.7 km (913.2 mi)
- Winning time: 34h 53' 07"

Results
| Jersey awarded to the overall winner | Winner | Julián Arredondo (COL) | (Team Nippo–De Rosa) |
| | Second | Pieter Weening (NED) | (Orica–GreenEDGE) |
| | Third | Sergio Pardilla (ESP) | (MTN–Qhubeka) |
| Jersey awarded to the points classification winner | Points | Francesco Chicchi (ITA) | (Vini Fantini–Selle Italia) |
| Jersey awarded to the mountains classification winner | Mountains | Wang Meiyin (CHN) | (Hengxiang Cycling Team) |
| | Team | MTN–Qhubeka | |

The 2013 Tour de Langkawi was the 18th edition of the Tour de Langkawi, a cycling stage race that took place in Malaysia. The LTdL 2013, which carries the slogan "Can You Feel The Heat?" and "The Heat is On!", was officially begun on 21 February in Kangar and ended on 2 March in Kuala Terengganu.

The race was sanctioned by the Union Cycliste Internationale (UCI) as a 2.HC (hors category) race on the 2012–13 UCI Asia Tour calendar. The race was organised by the Ministry of Youth and Sports, via the National Sports Council (NSC) in association with the Malaysian National Cycling Federation (MNCF).

Julián Arredondo of Colombia won the overall race, 1' 15" clear of Dutch cyclist Pieter Weening and Sergio Pardilla of Spain was third overall. In the race's other classifications, Italian rider Francesco Chicchi won the blue jersey for points classification and Wang Meiyin of China won the red jersey for mountains classification and white jersey for Asian rider classification. MTN–Qhubeka won the teams classification and Tabriz Petrochemical Team won the Asian teams classification.

== Teams ==
22 teams accepted invitations to participate in the 2013 Tour de Langkawi. Five UCI ProTeams were invited to the race, along with six UCI Professional Continental and nine UCI Continental teams. The field was completed by two national selection teams.

UCI ProTour teams

- Astana
- Blanco Pro Cycling
- Garmin–Sharp
- Omega Pharma–Quick-Step
- Orica–GreenEDGE

UCI Professional Continental teams

- Androni Giocattoli–Venezuela
- Champion System
- MTN–Qhubeka
- Team Europcar
- UnitedHealthcare
- Vini Fantini–Selle Italia

UCI Continental teams

- Aisan Racing Team
- Hengxiang Cycling Team
- KSPO
- OCBC Singapore Continental Cycling Team
- RTS Racing Team
- Synergy Baku
- Tabriz Petrochemical Team
- Team Nippo–De Rosa
- Terengganu Cycling Team

National teams

- Indonesia
- Malaysia

== Stages ==
The race comprises 10 stages, covering 1469.7 kilometres.

| Stage | Date | Course | Distance | Stage result | | |
| Stage | Date | Course | Distance | Winner | Second | Third |
|---|---|---|---|---|---|---|
| 1 | 21 February | Kangar to Kulim | 162.7 km (101.1 mi) | (Netherlands) Theo Bos; Blanco Pro Cycling | (France) Bryan Coquard; Team Europcar | (Italy) Andrea Guardini; Astana |
| 2 | 22 February | Serdang to Kuala Kangsar | 117.8 km (73.2 mi) | (Netherlands) Theo Bos; Blanco Pro Cycling | (Italy) Andrea Guardini; Astana | (Lithuania) Aidis Kruopis; Orica–GreenEDGE |
| 3 | 23 February | Sungai Siput to Cameron Highlands | 140.7 km (87.4 mi) | (China) Wang Meiyin; Hengxiang Cycling Team | (Colombia) Julián Arredondo; Team Nippo–De Rosa | (Australia) Nathan Haas; Garmin–Sharp |
| 4 | 24 February | Tapah to Kapar | 168.0 km (104.4 mi) | (Italy) Francesco Chicchi; Vini Fantini–Selle Italia | (Italy) Andrea Guardini; Astana | (Lithuania) Aidis Kruopis; Orica–GreenEDGE |
| 5 | 25 February | Proton, Shah Alam to Genting Highlands | 110.3 km (68.5 mi) | (Colombia) Julián Arredondo; Team Nippo–De Rosa | (Netherlands) Pieter Weening; Orica–GreenEDGE | (Colombia) Víctor Niño; RTS Racing Team |
| 6 | 26 February | Mentakab to Kuantan | 217.5 km (135.1 mi) | (Netherlands) Tom Leezer; Blanco Pro Cycling | (South Korea) Jung Ji-Min; KSPO Cycling Team | (Poland) Michał Gołaś; Omega Pharma–Quick-Step |
| 7 | 27 February | Kuantan to Dungun | 149.8 km (93.1 mi) | (Italy) Andrea Guardini; Astana | (Italy) Francesco Chicchi; Vini Fantini–Selle Italia | (Lithuania) Aidis Kruopis; Orica–GreenEDGE |
| 8 | 28 February | Kuala Terengganu to Tanah Merah | 164.5 km (102.2 mi) | (France) Bryan Coquard; Team Europcar | (United Kingdom) Andrew Fenn; Omega Pharma–Quick-Step | (Italy) Francesco Chicchi; Vini Fantini–Selle Italia |
| 9 | 1 March | Pasir Puteh to Kuala Berang | 123.6 km (76.8 mi) | (France) Bryan Coquard; Team Europcar | (Italy) Francesco Chicchi; Vini Fantini–Selle Italia | (Australia) Allan Davis; Orica–GreenEDGE |
| 10 | 2 March | Tasik Kenyir to Kuala Terengganu Criterium | 114.8 km (71.3 mi) | (Italy) Francesco Chicchi; Vini Fantini–Selle Italia | (New Zealand) Rico Rogers; Synergy Baku Cycling Project | (Australia) Graeme Brown; Blanco Pro Cycling |

== Classification leadership ==
| Stage | Stage winner | General classification | Points classification | Mountains classification | Asian rider classification | Team classification | Asian team classification |
|---|---|---|---|---|---|---|---|
| 1 | Theo Bos | Theo Bos | Theo Bos | Wang Meiyin | Wang Meiyin | UnitedHealthcare | KSPO Cycling Team |
| 2 | Theo Bos | Theo Bos | Theo Bos | Seo Joon-yong | Wang Meiyin | Garmin–Sharp | KSPO Cycling Team |
| 3 | Wang Meiyin | Wang Meiyin | Wang Meiyin | Wang Meiyin | Wang Meiyin | MTN–Qhubeka | Tabriz Petrochemical Team |
| 4 | Francesco Chicchi | Wang Meiyin | Andrea Guardini | Wang Meiyin | Wang Meiyin | MTN–Qhubeka | Tabriz Petrochemical Team |
| 5 | Julián Arredondo | Julián Arredondo | Andrea Guardini | Julián Arredondo | Wang Meiyin | MTN–Qhubeka | Tabriz Petrochemical Team |
| 6 | Tom Leezer | Julián Arredondo | Andrea Guardini | Wang Meiyin | Wang Meiyin | MTN–Qhubeka | Tabriz Petrochemical Team |
| 7 | Andrea Guardini | Julián Arredondo | Andrea Guardini | Wang Meiyin | Wang Meiyin | MTN–Qhubeka | Tabriz Petrochemical Team |
| 8 | Bryan Coquard | Julián Arredondo | Andrea Guardini | Wang Meiyin | Wang Meiyin | MTN–Qhubeka | Tabriz Petrochemical Team |
| 9 | Bryan Coquard | Julián Arredondo | Andrea Guardini | Wang Meiyin | Wang Meiyin | MTN–Qhubeka | Tabriz Petrochemical Team |
| 10 | Francesco Chicchi | Julián Arredondo | Francesco Chicchi | Wang Meiyin | Wang Meiyin | MTN–Qhubeka | Tabriz Petrochemical Team |
| Final | | Julián Arredondo | Francesco Chicchi | Wang Meiyin | Wang Meiyin | MTN–Qhubeka | Tabriz Petrochemical Team |

== Final standings ==
=== General classification ===
Final general classification (1–10)
| | Rider | Team | Time |
|---|---|---|---|
| 1 | Julián Arredondo (COL) | Team Nippo–De Rosa | 34h 53' 07" |
| 2 | Pieter Weening (NED) | Orica–GreenEDGE | + 1' 15" |
| 3 | Sergio Pardilla (ESP) | MTN–Qhubeka | + 2' 10" |
| 4 | Peter Stetina (USA) | Garmin–Sharp | + 2' 30" |
| 5 | Wang Meiyin (CHN) | Hengxiang Cycling Team | + 2' 40" |
| 6 | Nathan Haas (AUS) | Garmin–Sharp | + 2' 43" |
| 7 | Fortunato Baliani (ITA) | Team Nippo–De Rosa | + 2' 49" |
| 8 | John Ebsen (DEN) | Synergy Baku | + 2' 55" |
| 9 | Tsgabu Grmay (ETH) | MTN–Qhubeka | + 2' 58" |
| 10 | Amir Kolahdozhagh (IRI) | Tabriz Petrochemical Team | + 2' 58" |

Final general classification (11–109)
| | Rider | Team | Time |
|---|---|---|---|
| 11 | Víctor Niño (COL) | RTS Racing Team | + 3' 19" |
| 12 | Jonathan Monsalve (VEN) | Vini Fantini–Selle Italia | + 3' 30" |
| 13 | Ghader Mizbani (IRI) | Tabriz Petrochemical Team | + 3' 38" |
| 14 | Jacques Janse van Rensburg (RSA) | MTN–Qhubeka | + 3' 58" |
| 15 | Alexsandr Dyachenko (KAZ) | Astana | + 4' 24" |
| 16 | Serge Pauwels (BEL) | Omega Pharma–Quick-Step | + 4' 34" |
| 17 | Tomás Gil (VEN) | Androni Giocattoli–Venezuela | + 4' 38" |
| 18 | Lucas Euser (USA) | UnitedHealthcare | + 5' 24" |
| 19 | Jackson Rodríguez (VEN) | Androni Giocattoli–Venezuela | + 5' 38" |
| 20 | Pierre Rolland (FRA) | Team Europcar | + 5' 40" |
| 21 | Andrey Kashechkin (KAZ) | Astana | + 7' 06" |
| 22 | Chris Butler (USA) | Champion System | + 8' 44" |
| 23 | Kirill Pozdnyakov (RUS) | Synergy Baku Cycling Project | + 9' 12" |
| 24 | Dennis Van Niekerk (RSA) | MTN–Qhubeka | + 10' 53" |
| 25 | Yukiya Arashiro (JPN) | Team Europcar | + 11' 09" |
| 26 | Connor McConvey (IRL) | Synergy Baku Cycling Project | + 12' 02" |
| 27 | Marc Goos (NED) | Blanco Pro Cycling | + 12' 06" |
| 28 | Adiq Husainie Othman (MAS) | Champion System | + 12' 09" |
| 29 | Jani Tewelde (ETH) | MTN–Qhubeka | + 12' 14" |
| 30 | Chad Beyer (USA) | Champion System | + 12' 28" |
| 31 | Carlos Verona (ESP) | Omega Pharma–Quick-Step | + 13' 03" |
| 32 | Alex Destribois (FRA) | RTS Racing Team | + 13' 29" |
| 33 | Patrick Facchini (ITA) | Androni Giocattoli–Venezuela | + 13' 35" |
| 34 | Xing Fu (CHN) | Hengxiang Cycling Team | + 13' 54" |
| 35 | Saufi Mat Senan (MAS) | Terengganu Cycling Team | + 14' 17" |
| 36 | Hari Fitrianto (INA) | Indonesia | + 14' 36" |
| 37 | Saeid Safarzadeh (IRI) | Tabriz Petrochemical Team | + 15' 40" |
| 38 | Masakazu Ito (JPN) | Aisan Racing Team | + 16' 16" |
| 39 | Assan Bazayev (KAZ) | Astana | + 16' 18" |
| 40 | Liu Jianpeng (CHN) | Hengxiang Cycling Team | + 16' 47" |
| 41 | Lutfi Md Fauzan (MAS) | Malaysia | + 17' 21" |
| 42 | Rauf Nur Misbah (MAS) | Malaysia | + 17' 54" |
| 43 | Diego Rosa (ITA) | Androni Giocattoli–Venezuela | + 18' 32" |
| 44 | Dadi Suryadi (INA) | Indonesia | + 20' 00" |
| 45 | Aiman Cahyadi (INA) | Indonesia | + 20' 04" |
| 46 | Phuchong Sai-Udomsin (THA) | OCBC Singapore Continental Cycling Team | + 20' 26" |
| 47 | Bert Grabsch (GER) | Omega Pharma–Quick-Step | + 20' 29" |
| 48 | Gregor Gazvoda (SLO) | Champion System | + 21' 43" |
| 49 | Endra Wijaya (INA) | Indonesia | + 21' 59" |
| 50 | Jung Ji-Min (KOR) | KSPO Cycling Team | + 22' 40" |
| 51 | Robin Manulang (INA) | Indonesia | + 23' 59" |
| 52 | Kwon Soon-Yeong (KOR) | KSPO Cycling Team | + 24' 06" |
| 53 | Yasuharu Nakajima (JPN) | Aisan Racing Team | + 25' 09" |
| 54 | Park Sung-Baek (KOR) | KSPO Cycling Team | + 25' 55" |
| 55 | Ruslan Tleubayev (KAZ) | Astana | + 26' 02" |
| 56 | Michał Gołaś (POL) | Omega Pharma–Quick-Step | + 30' 10" |
| 57 | Carlos José Ochoa (VEN) | Androni Giocattoli–Venezuela | + 32' 07" |
| 58 | Meron Russom (ERI) | MTN–Qhubeka | + 32' 22" |
| 59 | Perrig Quémeneur (FRA) | Team Europcar | + 33' 42" |
| 60 | Craig Lewis (USA) | Champion System | + 34' 16" |
| 61 | Óscar Pujol (ESP) | RTS Racing Team | + 35' 57" |
| 62 | Shinichi Fukushima (JPN) | Team Nippo–De Rosa | + 36' 18" |
| 63 | Saiful Anuar Aziz (MAS) | Terengganu Cycling Team | + 37' 31" |
| 64 | Yusrizal Usoff (MAS) | Malaysia | + 37' 41" |
| 65 | Bryan Coquard (FRA) | Team Europcar | + 37' 50" |
| 66 | Travis Meyer (AUS) | Orica–GreenEDGE | + 38' 35" |
| 67 | Yeon Je-Sung (KOR) | KSPO | + 39' 12" |
| 68 | Umardi Rosdi (MAS) | Terengganu Cycling Team | + 39' 27" |
| 69 | Mohd Nur Rizuan Zainal (MAS) | Malaysia | + 39' 42" |
| 70 | Liu Yilin (CHN) | Hengxiang Cycling Team | + 40' 19" |
| 71 | Li Fuyu (CHN) | Hengxiang Cycling Team | + 40' 25" |
| 72 | Alexey Lutsenko (KAZ) | Astana | + 41' 16" |
| 73 | Ng Yong Li (MAS) | RTS Racing Team | + 41' 31" |
| 74 | Stefano Borchi (ITA) | Vini Fantini–Selle Italia | + 41' 54" |
| 75 | Jonathan Clarke (AUS) | UnitedHealthcare | + 41' 54" |
| 76 | Dan Craven (NAM) | Synergy Baku | + 42' 09" |
| 77 | Kévin Reza (FRA) | Team Europcar | + 42' 35" |
| 78 | Koldo Fernández (ESP) | Garmin–Sharp | + 42' 54" |
| 79 | Andrew Fenn (GBR) | Omega Pharma–Quick-Step | + 43' 47" |
| 80 | Omar Bertazzo (ITA) | Androni Giocattoli–Venezuela | + 43' 56" |
| 81 | Junya Sano (JPN) | Vini Fantini–Selle Italia | + 44' 55" |
| 82 | Seo Joon-Yong (KOR) | KSPO Cycling Team | + 45' 06" |
| 83 | Choi Seung-Woo (KOR) | KSPO Cycling Team | + 45' 42" |
| 84 | Jang Sun-jae (KOR) | RTS Racing Team | + 45' 45" |
| 85 | Anuar Manan (MAS) | Synergy Baku Cycling Project | + 46' 23" |
| 86 | Rico Rogers (NZL) | Synergy Baku Cycling Project | + 46' 43" |
| 87 | Manabu Ishibashi (JPN) | Team Nippo–De Rosa | + 46' 44" |
| 88 | Hossein Nateghi (IRI) | Tabriz Petrochemical Team | + 46' 49" |
| 89 | Mehdi Sohrabi (IRI) | Tabriz Petrochemical Team | + 46' 55" |
| 90 | Harrif Salleh (MAS) | Terengganu Cycling Team | + 47' 10" |
| 91 | Andrea Guardini (ITA) | Astana | + 47' 43" |
| 92 | Afif Ahmad Zamri (MAS) | Malaysia | + 47' 46" |
| 93 | Allan Davis (AUS) | Orica–GreenEDGE | + 48' 07" |
| 94 | Zamri Salleh (MAS) | Terengganu Cycling Team | + 48' 20" |
| 95 | Francesco Chicchi (ITA) | Vini Fantini–Selle Italia | + 48' 46" |
| 96 | Low Ji Wen (SIN) | OCBC Singapore Continental Cycling Team | + 49' 14" |
| 97 | Shimpei Fukuda (JPN) | Aisan Racing Team | + 49' 20" |
| 98 | Aldo Ino Ilešič (SLO) | UnitedHealthcare | + 49' 20" |
| 99 | Jacob Keough (USA) | UnitedHealthcare | + 49' 20" |
| 100 | Kazuhiro Mori (JPN) | Aisan Racing Team | + 49' 20" |
| 101 | Raymond Kreder (NED) | Garmin–Sharp | + 50' 03" |
| 102 | Fatahillah Abdullah (INA) | Indonesia | + 50' 13" |
| 103 | Fabian Schnaidt (GER) | Champion System | + 50' 29" |
| 104 | Graeme Brown (AUS) | Blanco Pro Cycling | + 50' 33" |
| 105 | Michele Merlo (ITA) | Vini Fantini–Selle Italia | + 54' 42" |
| 106 | Mauro Abel Richeze (ARG) | Team Nippo–De Rosa | + 56' 11" |
| 107 | Loh Sea Keong (MAS) | OCBC Singapore Continental Cycling Team | + 56' 52" |
| 108 | Wang Bo (CHN) | Hengxiang Cycling Team | + 01h 00' 02" |
| 109 | Tanzou Tokuda (JPN) | Team Nippo–De Rosa | + 01h 10' 31" |

=== Points classification ===
| | Rider | Team | Points |
|---|---|---|---|
| 1 | Francesco Chicchi (ITA) | Vini Fantini–Selle Italia | 96 |
| 2 | Andrea Guardini (ITA) | Astana | 89 |
| 3 | Anuar Manan (MAS) | Synergy Baku Cycling Project | 76 |
| 4 | Andrew Fenn (GBR) | Omega Pharma–Quick-Step | 69 |
| 5 | Bryan Coquard (FRA) | Team Europcar | 64 |
| 6 | Allan Davis (AUS) | Orica–GreenEDGE | 51 |
| 7 | Harrif Salleh (MAS) | Terengganu Cycling Team | 47 |
| 8 | Rico Rogers (NZL) | Synergy Baku Cycling Project | 46 |
| 9 | (Australia) Travis Meyer | Orica–GreenEDGE | 39 |
| 10 | Hossein Nateghi (IRI) | Tabriz Petrochemical Team | 37 |
| 10 | Raymond Kreder (NED) | Garmin–Sharp | 37 |

=== Mountains classification ===
| | Rider | Team | Points |
|---|---|---|---|
| 1 | Wang Meiyin (CHN) | Hengxiang Cycling Team | 48 |
| 2 | Julián Arredondo (COL) | Team Nippo–De Rosa | 45 |
| 3 | Pieter Weening (NED) | Androni Giocattoli–Venezuela | 32 |
| 4 | Víctor Niño (COL) | RTS Racing Team | 24 |
| 5 | Nathan Haas (AUS) | Garmin–Sharp | 19 |
| 6 | Peter Stetina (USA) | Garmin–Sharp | 16 |
| 6 | Jonathan Monsalve (VEN) | Vini Fantini–Selle Italia | 16 |
| 8 | Sergio Pardilla (ESP) | MTN–Qhubeka | 13 |
| 9 | Seo Joon-Yong (KOR) | KSPO Cycling Team | 12 |
| 10 | Fortunato Baliani (ITA) | Team Nippo–De Rosa | 10 |
| 10 | Tsgabu Grmay (ETH) | MTN–Qhubeka | 10 |
| 10 | Loh Sea Keong (MAS) | OCBC Singapore Continental Cycling Team | 10 |

=== Asian rider classification ===
| | Rider | Team | Time |
|---|---|---|---|
| 1 | Wang Meiyin (CHN) | Hengxiang Cycling Team | 34h 55' 47" |
| 2 | Amir Kolahdozhagh (IRI) | Tabriz Petrochemical Team | + 18" |
| 3 | Ghader Mizbani (IRI) | Tabriz Petrochemical Team | + 58" |
| 4 | Alexsandr Dyachenko (KAZ) | Astana | + 1' 44" |
| 5 | Andrey Kashechkin (KAZ) | Astana | + 4' 26" |
| 6 | Yukiya Arashiro (JPN) | Team Europcar | + 8' 29" |
| 7 | Adiq Husainie Othman (MAS) | Champion System | + 9' 29" |
| 8 | Xing Fu (CHN) | Hengxiang Cycling Team | + 11' 14" |
| 9 | Saufi Mat Senan (MAS) | Terengganu Cycling Team | + 11' 37" |
| 10 | Hari Fitrianto (INA) | Indonesia | + 11' 56" |

=== Team classification ===
| | Team | Time |
|---|---|---|
| 1 | MTN–Qhubeka | 104h 48' 19" |
| 2 | Tabriz Petrochemical Team | + 09' 00" |
| 3 | Androni Giocattoli–Venezuela | + 13' 00" |
| 4 | Synergy Baku Cycling Project | + 15' 00" |
| 5 | Astana | + 16' 28" |
| 6 | Omega Pharma–Quick-Step | + 17' 01" |
| 7 | Team Nippo–De Rosa | + 17' 59" |
| 8 | Team Europcar | + 18' 02" |
| 9 | Garmin–Sharp | + 21' 55" |
| 10 | Champion System | + 23' 51" |

=== Asian team classification ===
| | Team | Time |
|---|---|---|
| 1 | Tabriz Petrochemical Team | 104h 57' 19" |
| 2 | Astana | + 7' 34" |
| 3 | Hengxiang Cycling Team | + 15' 29" |
| 4 | Indonesia | + 27' 09" |
| 5 | Malaysia | + 35' 46" |
| 6 | KSPO | + 36' 42" |
| 7 | Aisan Racing Team | + 40' 40" |
| 8 | Terengganu Cycling Team | + 50' 25" |
| 9 | OCBC Singapore Continental Cycling Team | + 01h 30' 17" |
| 10 | Team Nippo–De Rosa | + 02h 15' 40" |

== Stage results ==
=== Stage 1 ===
21 February 2014 — Kangar to Kulim, 162.7 km (101.1 mi)

| | Rider | Team | Time |
|---|---|---|---|
| 1 | (Netherlands) Theo Bos | Blanco Pro Cycling | 4h 00' 17" |
| 2 | (France) Bryan Coquard | Team Europcar | + 0" |
| 3 | (Italy) Andrea Guardini | Astana | + 0" |
| 4 | (Australia) Steele Von Hoff | Garmin–Sharp | + 0" |
| 5 | (United States) Jacob Keough | UnitedHealthcare | + 0" |
| 6 | (Slovakia) Aldo Ino Ilesic | UnitedHealthcare | + 0" |
| 7 | (Malaysia) Anuar Manan | Synergy Baku | + 0" |
| 8 | (Italy) Francesco Chicchi | Vini Fantini–Selle Italia | + 0" |
| 9 | (Iran) Hossein Najafi | Tabriz Petrochemical Team | + 0" |
| 10 | (Argentina) Mauro Abel Richeze | Team Nippo–De Rosa | + 0" |

=== Stage 2 ===
28 February 2014 — Serdang to Kuala Kangsar, 117.8 km (73.2 mi)

| | Rider | Team | Time |
|---|---|---|---|
| 1 | (Netherlands) Theo Bos | Blanco Pro Cycling | 2h 54' 48" |
| 2 | (Italy) Andrea Guardini | Astana | + 0" |
| 3 | (Lithuania) Aidis Kruopis | Orica–GreenEDGE | + 0" |
| 4 | (France) Bryan Coquard | Team Europcar | + 0" |
| 5 | (United Kingdom) Andrew Fenn | Omega Pharma–Quick-Step | + 0" |
| 6 | (Italy) Francesco Chicchi | Vini Fantini–Selle Italia | + 0" |
| 7 | (Australia) Steele Von Hoff | Garmin–Sharp | + 0" |
| 8 | (Iran) Hossein Nateghi | Tabriz Petrochemical Team | + 0" |
| 9 | (Germany) Fabian Schnaidt | Champion System | + 0" |
| 10 | (Italy) Omar Bertazzo | Androni Giocattoli–Venezuela | + 0" |

=== Stage 3 ===
23 February 2013 — Sungai Siput to Cameron Highlands, 140.7 km (87.4 mi)

| | Rider | Team | Time |
|---|---|---|---|
| 1 | (China) Wang Meiyin | Hengxiang Cycling Team | 3h 50' 01" |
| 2 | (Colombia) Julián Arredondo | Team Nippo–De Rosa | + 0" |
| 3 | (Australia) Nathan Haas | Garmin–Sharp | + 0" |
| 4 | (Australia) Wesley Sulzberger | Orica–GreenEDGE | + 0" |
| 5 | (Netherlands) Pieter Weening | Orica–GreenEDGE | + 0" |
| 6 | (Venezuela) Yonathan Monsalve | Vini Fantini–Selle Italia | + 0" |
| 7 | (Belgium) Pieter Serry | Omega Pharma–Quick-Step | + 0" |
| 8 | (Italy) Fortunato Baliani | Team Nippo–De Rosa | + 0" |
| 9 | (Ethiopia) Tsgabu Grmay | MTN–Qhubeka | + 0" |
| 10 | (South Africa) Dennis Van Niekerk | MTN–Qhubeka | + 0" |

=== Stage 4 ===
24 February 2013 — Tapah to Kapar, 168.0 km (104.4 mi)

| | Rider | Team | Time |
|---|---|---|---|
| 1 | (Italy) Francesco Chicchi | Vini Fantini–Selle Italia | 3h 44' 22" |
| 2 | (Italy) Andrea Guardini | Astana | + 0" |
| 3 | (Lithuania) Aidis Kruopis | Orica–GreenEDGE | + 0" |
| 4 | (Netherlands) Raymond Kreder | Garmin–Sharp | + 0" |
| 5 | (United Kingdom) Andrew Fenn | Orica–GreenEDGE | + 0" |
| 6 | (Slovakia) Aldo Ino Ilesic | UnitedHealthcare | + 0" |
| 7 | (Kazakhstan) Ruslan Tleubayev | Astana | + 0" |
| 8 | (Malaysia) Anuar Manan | Synergy Baku | + 0" |
| 9 | (Japan) Takeaki Ayabe | Aisan Racing Team | + 0" |
| 10 | (Japan) Kazuhiro Mori | Aisan Racing Team | + 0" |

=== Stage 5 ===
25 February 2013 — Proton, Shah Alam to Genting Highlands, 110.3 km (68.5 mi)

| | Rider | Team | Time |
|---|---|---|---|
| 1 | (Colombia) Julián Arredondo | Team Nippo–De Rosa | 3h 11' 41" |
| 2 | (Netherlands) Pieter Weening | Orica–GreenEDGE | + 0" |
| 3 | (Colombia) Víctor Niño | RTS Racing Team | + 0" |
| 4 | (Spain) Sergio Pardilla | MTN–Qhubeka | + 0" |
| 5 | (United States) Peter Stetina | Garmin–Sharp | + 0" |
| 6 | (Iran) Amir Kolahdozhagh | Tabriz Petrochemical Team | + 0" |
| 7 | (Ethiopia) Tsgabu Grmay | MTN–Qhubeka | + 0" |
| 8 | (Italy) Fortunato Baliani | Team Nippo–De Rosa | + 0" |
| 9 | (Denmark) John Ebsen | Synergy Baku | + 0" |
| 10 | (Australia) Nathan Haas | Garmin–Sharp | + 0" |

=== Stage 6 ===
26 February 2013 — Mentakab to Kuantan, 217.5 km (135.1 mi)

| | Rider | Team | Time |
|---|---|---|---|
| 1 | (Netherlands) Tom Leezer | Blanco Pro Cycling | 4h 33' 42" |
| 2 | (South Korea) Jung Ji-Min | KSPO Cycling Team | + 0" |
| 3 | (Poland) Michał Gołaś | Omega Pharma–Quick-Step | + 0" |
| 4 | (Venezuela) Jackson Rodríguez | Androni Giocattoli–Venezuela | + 0" |
| 5 | (Australia) Travis Meyer | Orica–GreenEDGE | + 0" |
| 6 | (Italy) Andrea Guardini | Astana | + 0" |
| 7 | (Australia) Allan Davis | Orica–GreenEDGE | + 0" |
| 8 | (United States) Jacob Keough | UnitedHealthcare | + 0" |
| 9 | (Malaysia) Harrif Salleh | Terengganu Cycling Team | + 0" |
| 10 | (Malaysia) Anuar Manan | Synergy Baku | + 0" |

=== Stage 7 ===
27 February 2013 — Kuantan to Dungun, 149.8 km (93.1 mi)

| | Rider | Team | Time |
|---|---|---|---|
| 1 | (Italy) Andrea Guardini | Astana | 3h 37' 17" |
| 2 | (Italy) Francesco Chicchi | Vini Fantini–Selle Italia | + 0" |
| 3 | (Lithuania) Aidis Kruopis | Orica–GreenEDGE | + 0" |
| 4 | (Australia) Allan Davis | Orica–GreenEDGE | + 0" |
| 5 | (United Kingdom) Andrew Fenn | Omega Pharma–Quick-Step | + 0" |
| 6 | (Australia) Steele Von Hoff | Garmin–Sharp | + 0" |
| 7 | (Australia) Graeme Brown | Blanco Pro Cycling | + 0" |
| 8 | (France) Bryan Coquard | Team Europcar | + 0" |
| 9 | (Japan) Taiji Nishitani | Aisan Racing Team | + 0" |
| 10 | (New Zealand) Rico Rogers | Synergy Baku | + 0" |

=== Stage 8 ===
28 February 2013 — Kuala Terengganu to Tanah Merah, 164.5 km (102.2 mi)

| | Rider | Team | Time |
|---|---|---|---|
| 1 | (France) Bryan Coquard | Team Europcar | 3h 36' 47" |
| 2 | (United Kingdom) Andrew Fenn | Orica–GreenEDGE | + 0" |
| 3 | (Italy) Francesco Chicchi | Vini Fantini–Selle Italia | + 0" |
| 4 | (Italy) Andrea Guardini | Astana | + 0" |
| 5 | (New Zealand) Rico Rogers | Synergy Baku | + 0" |
| 6 | (Italy) Omar Bertazzo | Androni Giocattoli–Venezuela | + 0" |
| 7 | (Netherlands) Raymond Kreder | Garmin–Sharp | + 0" |
| 8 | (Iran) Hossein Nateghi | Tabriz Petrochemical Team | + 0" |
| 9 | (Malaysia) Anuar Manan | Synergy Baku | + 0" |
| 10 | (Eritrea) Jani Tewelde Weldegabir | MTN–Qhubeka | + 0" |

=== Stage 9 ===
1 March 2013 — Pasir Puteh to Kuala Berang, 123.6 km (76.8 mi)

| | Rider | Team | Time |
|---|---|---|---|
| 1 | (France) Bryan Coquard | Team Europcar | + 02h 42' 11" |
| 2 | (Italy) Francesco Chicchi | Vini Fantini–Selle Italia | + 0" |
| 3 | (Australia) Allan Davis | Orica–GreenEDGE | + 0" |
| 4 | (Netherlands) Raymond Kreder | Garmin–Sharp | + 0" |
| 5 | (Germany) Fabian Schnaidt | Champion System | + 0" |
| 6 | (United States) Jacob Keough | UnitedHealthcare | + 0" |
| 7 | (Malaysia) Anuar Manan | Synergy Baku | + 0" |
| 8 | (South Korea) Park Sung Baek | KSPO | + 0" |
| 9 | (New Zealand) Rico Rogers | Synergy Baku | + 0" |
| 10 | (Iran) Hossein Nateghi | Tabriz Petrochemical Team | + 0" |

=== Stage 10 ===
2 March 2013 — Tasik Kenyir to Kuala Terengganu, 114.8 km (71.3 mi)

| | Rider | Team | Time |
|---|---|---|---|
| 1 | (Italy) Francesco Chicchi | Vini Fantini–Selle Italia | 2h 39' 04" |
| 2 | (New Zealand) Rico Rogers | Synergy Baku | + 0" |
| 3 | (Australia) Graeme Brown | Blanco Pro Cycling | + 0" |
| 4 | (Australia) Allan Davis | Orica–GreenEDGE | + 0" |
| 5 | (United Kingdom) Andrew Fenn | Omega Pharma–Quick-Step | + 0" |
| 6 | (Malaysia) Anuar Manan | Synergy Baku | + 0" |
| 7 | (Germany) Fabian Schnaidt | Champion System | + 0" |
| 8 | (Italy) Omar Bertazzo | Androni Giocattoli–Venezuela | + 0" |
| 9 | (Japan) Kazuhiro Mori | Aisan Racing Team | + 0" |
| 10 | (Malaysia) Mohamed Harrif Salleh | Terengganu Cycling Team | + 0" |

== List of teams and riders ==
A total of 22 teams were invited to participate in the 2013 Tour de Langkawi. Out of the 132 riders, a total of 109 riders made it to the finish in Kuala Terengganu.

Garmin–Sharp

- (Spain) Koldo Fernández
- (Australia) Nathan Haas
- (Netherlands) Raymond Kreder
- (United States) Caleb Fairly
- (United States) Peter Stetina
- (Australia) Steele Von Hoff

Astana

- (Italy) Andrea Guardini
- (Kazakhstan) Alexsandr Dyachenko
- (Kazakhstan) Assan Bazayev
- (Kazakhstan) Alexey Lutsenko
- (Kazakhstan) Andrey Kashechkin
- (Kazakhstan) Ruslan Tleubayev

Orica–GreenEDGE

- (Australia) Allan Davis
- (Australia) Luke Durbridge
- (Lithuania) Aidis Kruopis
- (Australia) Travis Meyer
- (Australia) Wesley Sulzberger
- (Netherlands) Pieter Weening

Blanco Pro Cycling

- (Netherlands) Theo Bos
- (Australia) Graeme Brown
- (Netherlands) Jetse Bol
- (Netherlands) Tom Leezer
- (Netherlands) Jos van Emden
- (Netherlands) Marc Goos

Omega Pharma–Quick-Step

- (Germany) Bert Grabsch
- (United Kingdom) Andrew Fenn
- (Poland) Michał Gołaś
- (Belgium) Serge Pauwels
- (Belgium) Pieter Serry
- (Spain) Carlos Verona

Vini Fantini–Selle Italia

- (Italy) Francesco Chicchi
- (Italy) Pierpaolo De Negri
- (Italy) Stefano Borchi
- (Italy) Michele Merlo
- (Venezuela) Jonathan Monsalve
- (Japan) Junya Sano

UnitedHealthcare

- (United States) Jacob Keough
- (Slovenia) Aldo Ino Ilešič
- (United States) John Murphy
- (United States) Jeff Louder
- (Australia) Jonathan Clarke
- (United States) Lucas Euser

Champion System

- (Malaysia) Adiq Husainie Othman
- (United States) Chad Beyer
- (United States) Chris Butler
- (Slovenia) Gregor Gazvoda
- (United States) Craig Lewis
- (Germany) Fabian Schnaidt

Team Europcar

- (Japan) Yukiya Arashiro
- (France) Bryan Coquard
- (France) Cyril Gautier
- (France) Perrig Quémeneur
- (France) Kévin Reza
- (France) Pierre Rolland

Androni Giocattoli–Venezuela

- (Venezuela) Tomás Gil
- (Venezuela) Carlos José Ochoa
- (Venezuela) Jackson Rodríguez
- (Italy) Omar Bertazzo
- (Italy) Patrick Facchini
- (Italy) Diego Rosa

MTN–Qhubeka

- (South Africa) Dennis Van Niekerk
- (South Africa) Jacques Janse van Rensburg
- (Eritrea) Jani Tewelde
- (Eritrea) Meron Russom
- (Spain) Sergio Pardilla
- (Ethiopia) Tsgabu Grmay

Synergy Baku Cycling Project

- (Malaysia) Anuar Manan
- (New Zealand) Rico Rogers
- (Russia) Kirill Pozdnyakov
- (Namibia) Dan Craven
- (Denmark) John Ebsen
- (Republic of Ireland) Connor McConvey

Tabriz Petrochemical Team

- (Iran) Ghader Mizbani
- (Iran) Hossein Nateghi
- (Iran) Mehdi Sohrabi
- (Iran) Saeid Safarzadeh
- (Iran) Alireza Asgharzadeh
- (Iran) Amir Kolahdozhagh

RTS Racing Team

- (Malaysia) Ng Yong Li
- (South Korea) Jang Sun-jae
- (Colombia) Víctor Niño
- (Spain) Vidal Celis Zabala
- (France) Alex Destribois
- (Spain) Óscar Pujol

Terengganu Cycling Team

- (Malaysia) Harrif Salleh
- (Malaysia) Zamri Salleh
- (Malaysia) Umardi Rosdi
- (Malaysia) Saiful Anuar Aziz
- (Malaysia) Saufi Mat Senan
- (Malaysia) Shahrul Mat Amin

OCBC Singapore Continental Cycling Team

- (Malaysia) Loh Sea Keong
- (Netherlands) Josapheus Rabou
- (Thailand) Phuchong Sai-Udomsin
- (Singapore) Goh Choon Huat
- (Singapore) Ho Jun Rong
- (Singapore) Low Ji Wen

Team Nippo–De Rosa

- (Colombia) Julián Arredondo
- (Italy) Fortunato Baliani
- (Japan) Shinichi Fukushima
- (Japan) Manabu Ishibashi
- (Argentina) Mauro Abel Richeze
- (Japan) Tanzou Tokuda

Aisan Racing Team

- (Japan) Takeaki Ayabo
- (Japan) Taiji Nishitani
- (Japan) Kazuhiro Mori
- (Japan) Yasuharu Nakajima
- (Japan) Shimpei Fukuda
- (Japan) Masakazu Ito

KSPO

- (South Korea) Park Sung-Baek
- (South Korea) Choi Seung-Woo
- (South Korea) Seo Joon-Yong
- (South Korea) Yeon Je-Sung
- (South Korea) Jung Ji-Min
- (South Korea) Kwon Soon-Yeong

Hengxiang Cycling Team

- (China) Wang Meiyin
- (China) Li Fuyu
- (China) Xing Fu
- (China) Liu Yilin
- (China) Liu Jianpeng
- (China) Wang Bo

Malaysia

- (Malaysia) Lutfi Md Fauzan
- (Malaysia) Amir Mustafa Rusli
- (Malaysia) Rauf Nur Misbah
- (Malaysia) Mohd Nur Rizuan Zainal
- (Malaysia) Afif Ahmad Zamri
- (Malaysia) Yusrizal Usoff

Indonesia

- (Indonesia) Aiman Cahyadi
- (Indonesia) Dadi Suryadi
- (Indonesia) Hari Fitrianto
- (Indonesia) Endra Wijaya
- (Indonesia) Robin Manulang
- (Indonesia) Fatahillah Abdullah
