= Sport in Malaysia =

Sports in Malaysia are an important part of Malaysian culture. Sports in Malaysia are popular from both the participation and spectating aspect. Malaysians from different walks of life join in a wide variety of sports for recreation as well as for competition. In the broadest definition of sports—physical exercise of all sorts—the four most popular recreational sports among the general population of Malaysia are exercise walking, aerobic exercise, strength training, and running. Other most popular sports are bicycling, swimming, climbing, camping, bowling, hiking, fishing, scuba diving and paragliding.

In the spectating aspect, the spectator sports with most fans are association football, cricket, field hockey, rugby union, handball and mixed martial arts. Malaysia has hosted several major sports events including the Commonwealth Games in 1998.

== Individual sports ==
=== Outdoor sports ===
In the broadest definition of sports—physical exercise of all sorts—the four most popular recreational sports among the general population of Malaysia are exercise walking, aerobic exercise, strength training, and running. Most Malaysians live in housing areas with amenities such as public parks, pedestrian zone, health clubs and sport complexes nearby.

Other popular sports are bicycling, swimming, climbing, camping, bowling, hiking and fishing. Scuba diving is another recreation, particularly around the southeastern region of Sabah (on the island of Borneo). Paragliding was recently introduced sport in Malaysia.

=== Racquet sports ===
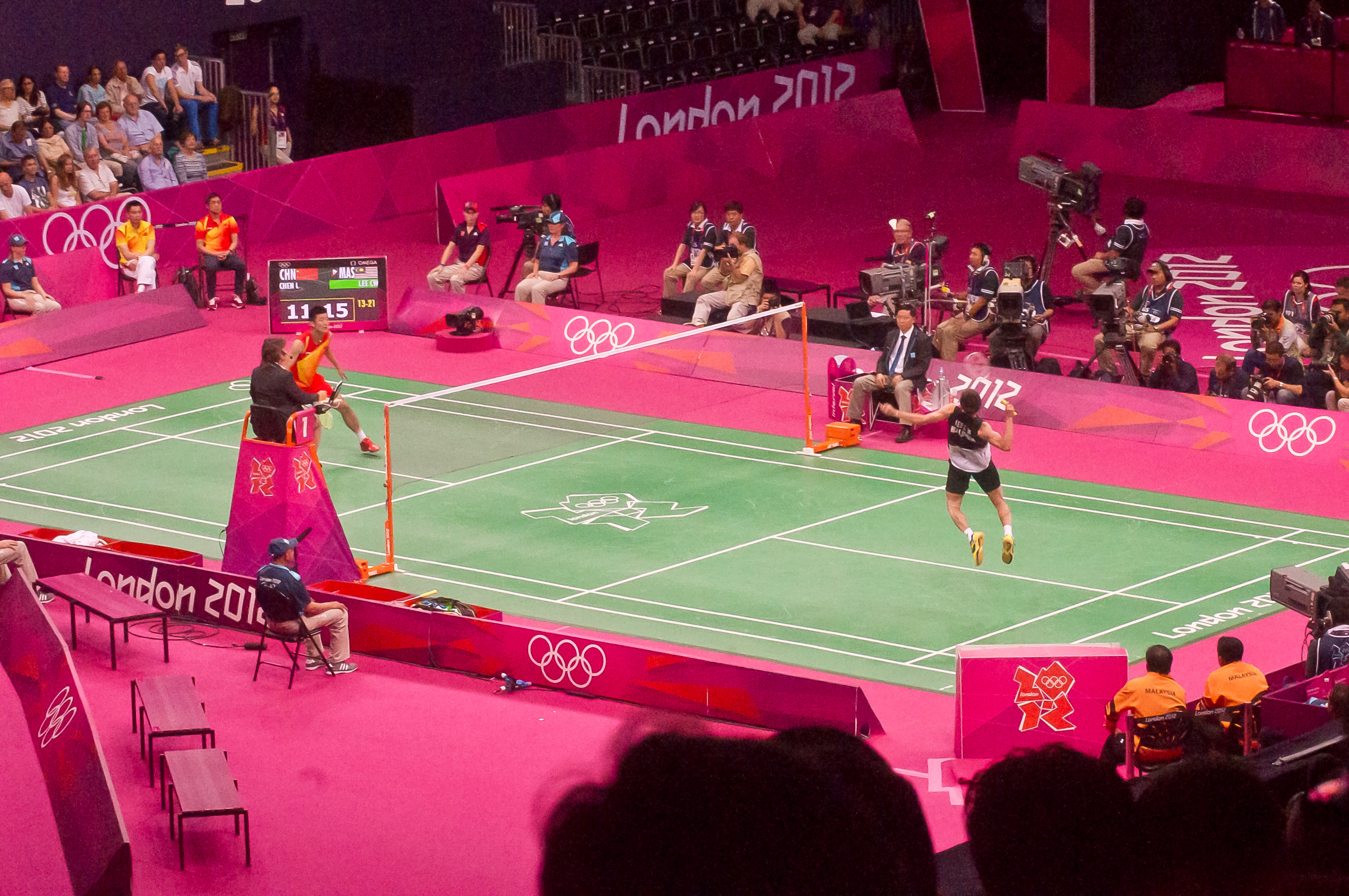
Lee Chong Wei

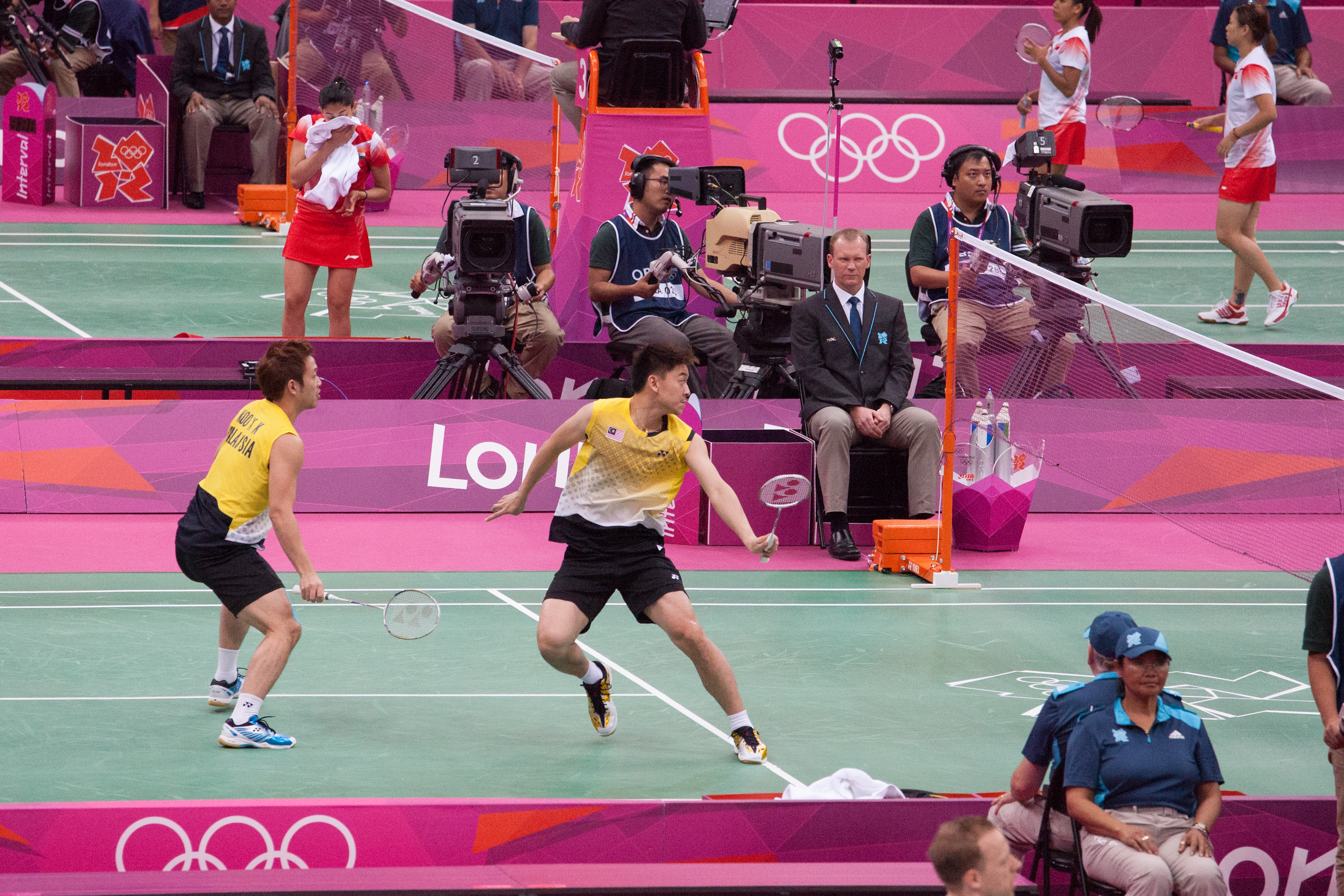
Koo Kien Keat and Tan Boon Heong

The Malaysia national badminton team has won 6 silver medals and 5 bronze medals in badminton in the Olympic Games since the sport was first introduced to the Olympics in 1992. In 1992, Razif Sidek and Jalani Sidek became the first ever Malaysian Olympic medallists, winning the bronze medal in men's doubles. In 1996, Rashid Sidek won the bronze medal in men's singles while Cheah Soon Kit and Yap Kim Hock won the silver medal in men's doubles. Lee Chong Wei won three silver medals in men's singles each in 2008, 2012 and 2016. In 2016, Chan Peng Soon and Goh Liu Ying won silver medals in mixed doubles while Tan Wee Kiong and Goh V Shem won silver medals in men's doubles. Aaron Chia and Soh Wooi Yik won two bronze medals in men's doubles each in 2021 and 2024. In 2024, Lee Zii Jia won bronze medal in men's singles.

In singles, where Malaysia has a weaker team than the doubles, the top men's shuttler is world number 10 Lee Zii Jia, followed by world number 24 Leong Jun Hao and world number 45 Justin Hoh. while Malaysia's best women's singles shuttler is Goh Jin Wei ranked world number 43, followed by world number 50 Letshanaa Karupathevan and world number 75 Kisona Selvaduray. National top men's doubles pair, Goh Sze Fei and Nur Izzuddin are placed world number 2, followed by Aaron Chia and Soh Wooi Yik who are ranked world number 5 as well as Man Wei Chong and Tee Kai Wun who are ranked world number 7 while the top women's doubles pair, Pearly Tan and Thinaah Muralitharan are ranked world number 4, followed by Go Pei Kee and Teoh Mei Xing at 25 and Ong Xin Yee and Carmen Ting at 60. Top mixed doubles pair, Goh Soon Huat and Shevon Jemie Lai are ranked world number 3 followed by world number 5 pair Chen Tang Jie and Toh Ee Wei as well as world number 14 pair Hoo Pang Ron and Cheng Su Yin in the BWF World Ranking (as of 6 May 2025). The Malaysia national badminton team is ranked world number 4 alongside Japan national badminton team in the BWF World Team Ranking (as of 1 April 2025).

Malaysia has won the Thomas Cup, the world men's team trophy, five times since it was first contested in 1949 and has been runner-up nine times as of 2014. In 2022, Aaron Chia and Soh Wooi Yik won gold medal in the men's doubles sector at the BWF World Championships, making history as the first ever Malaysian badminton player to win gold at the prestigious event. Malaysia also holds its own annual international badminton tournament, the Malaysia Open, which is now part of the Badminton World Federation's World Tour Super 1000 event and the Malaysia Masters, which is now part of the Badminton World Federation's World Tour Super 500 event.

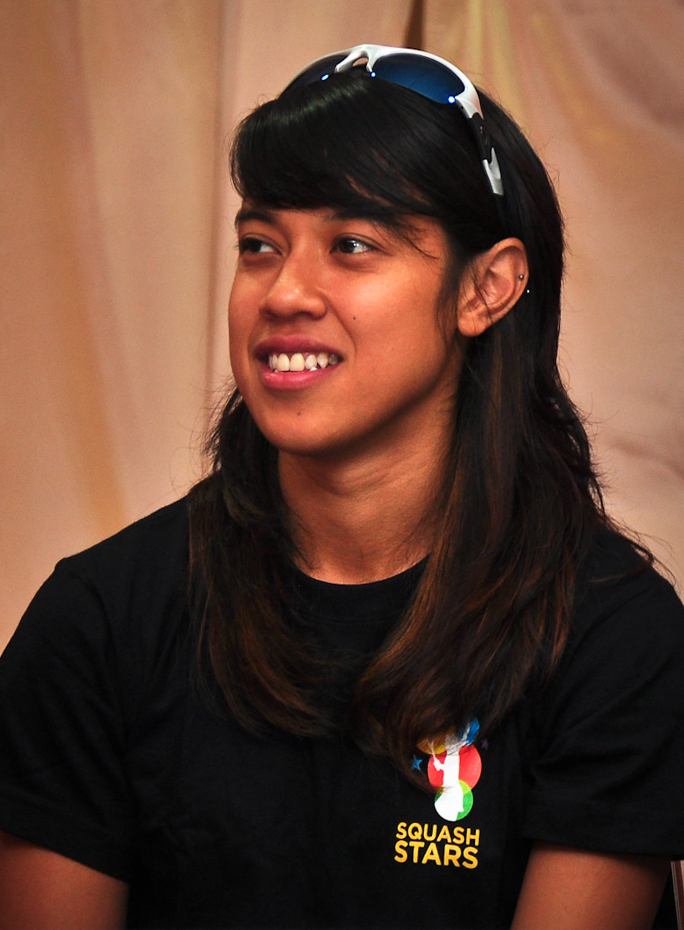
Nicol David

Squash in Malaysia is governed by the Squash Racquets Association of Malaysia (SRAM). The Kuala Lumpur Open and Malaysian Open are annual squash tournaments held in Malaysia. The Malaysia men's national squash team has reached the quarterfinal stage at the World Team Squash Championships six times. The men's team has won the Asian Squash Team Championships three times. The Malaysia women's national squash team has won the silver medal once and bronze medal at the World Team Squash Championships four times. The women's team has won the Asian Squash Team Championships seven times.

Nicol David is an eight-time world champion and ranked world number 1 in woman squash since 2006. Her compatriots Low Wee Wern and Delia Arnold are ranked world number 7 and 28, respectively in the WSA World Rankings (as of January 2015). Male squash players Mohd Nafiizwan Adnan and Ong Beng Hee are ranked world number 32 and 34, respectively in the PSA World Rankings (as of January 2015).

=== Precision sports ===
Hizlee Rais is ranked world number three in the World Bowls Singles Ranking List (as of 20 April 2013).

=== Cycle sports ===
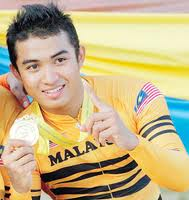
Azizulhasni Awang

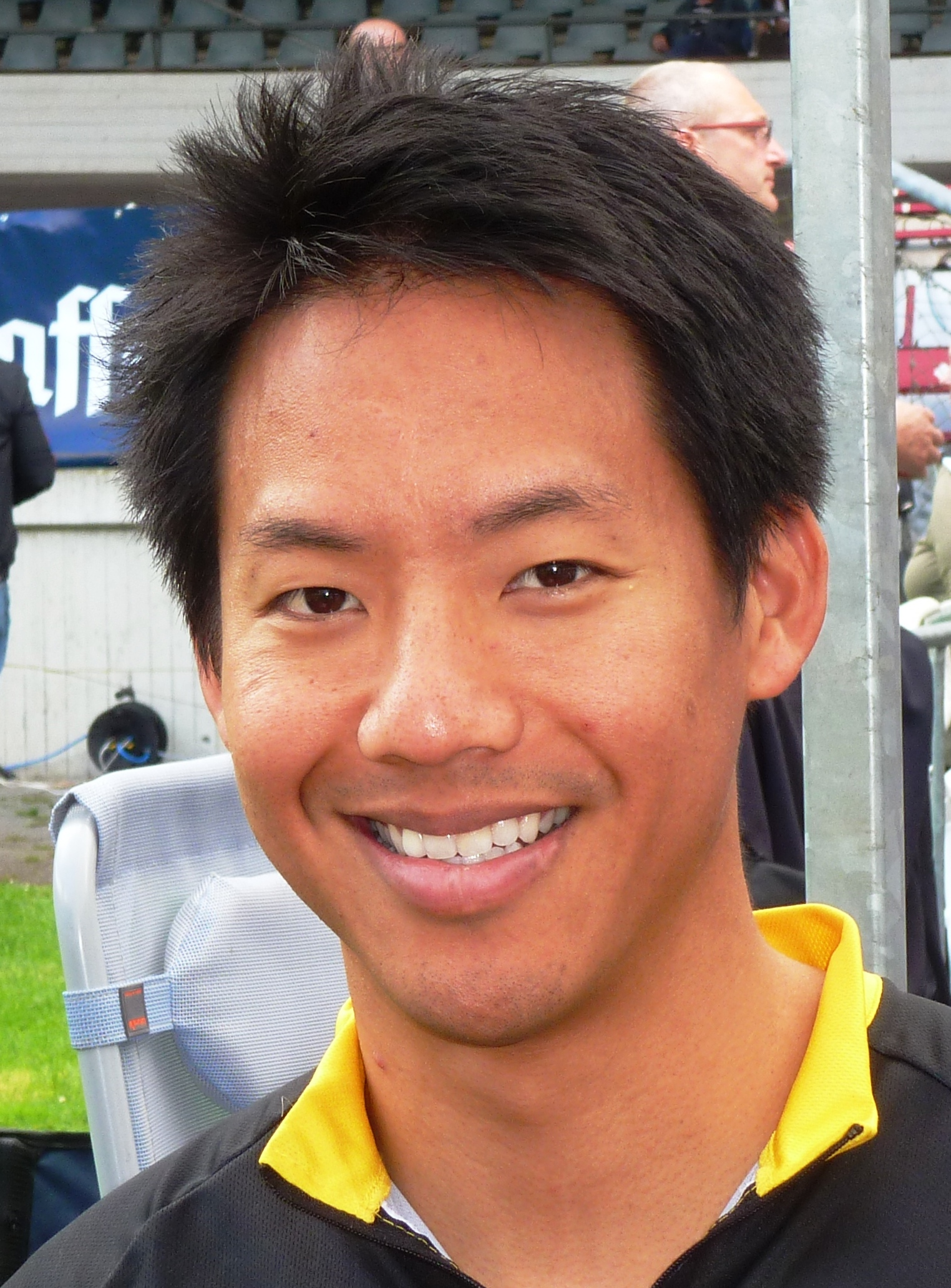
Josiah Ng

In 2016, Azizulhasni Awang made history for winning the first Olympic bronze medal in a cycling event. In 2021, Azizulhasni Awang made history again for winning the silver medal in 2021 Olympic men's keirin final. Malaysia hosts two international road cycling tours: the annual Tour de Langkawi and Jelajah Malaysia. Both races are part of the UCI Asia Tour. The Tour de Langkawi is the biggest cycling event in Asia and it is the one of five two hors-category (2.HC) classified races in Asia.

Track cycling is a growing sport in Malaysia. Malaysia has velodromes such as National Velodrome at Nilai and Velodrome Rakyat at Ipoh The Velodrome Rakyat is also Malaysia's first velodrome.

Azizulhasni Awang, Josiah Ng, Mohd Rizal Tisin, Muhammad Shah Firdaus Sahrom, Fatehah Mustapa and Jupha Somnet are among the top track cyclists in Malaysia. Loh Sea Keong won the general classification and Asian rider classification at the 2013 Jelajah Malaysia. Mohamed Harrif Salleh and Mohamed Zamri Salleh won the points classification and mountain classification respectively at the 2013 Jelajah Malaysia.

=== Water sports ===
Pandelela Rinong took a bronze medal in 10-metre platform event at the 2012 Summer Olympics. She became the first female Malaysian athlete to win a medal at the Olympics, as well as the first to win an Olympic medal in any sport other than Badminton. Bryan Nickson Lomas, Yeoh Ken Nee, Leong Mun Yee, Cheong Jun Hoong, Traisy Vivien Tukiet and Nur Dhabitah Sabri are among the top divers in Malaysia.

=== Extreme sports ===
Abdil Mahzan was the leader of 2012 World Cup Points final standings. Abdil Mahzan earned the title of IGSA World Cup Series Champion in the street luge event. His personal best maximum speed is 131 km/h, achieved at the 2011 IGSA World Championship in Teutonia, Brazil.

=== Endurance sports ===
Malaysia host some international marathon event such as the Kuala Lumpur Marathon, Borneo International Marathon and Penang Bridge International Marathon.

=== Combat sports ===
The indigenous martial art of Silat is widely practiced throughout Malaysia. Among Malaysian Chinese and Malaysian Indians, a wide variety of Chinese and Indian martial arts is also popular, such as the art of Silambam among Malaysians of Tamil Indian origin.

In the northern states of peninsular Malaysia, i.e., Perlis, Kedah, Kelantan and Terengganu, which were historically influenced by the neighbouring Thai culture, the Thai national sport of muay Thai is practiced. Locally, it is known as tomoi, which is the Malay rendition of the term toi muay (Thai: ต่อยมวย, RTGS: toi muai), an alternative name for muay Thai.

=== Motor sports ===
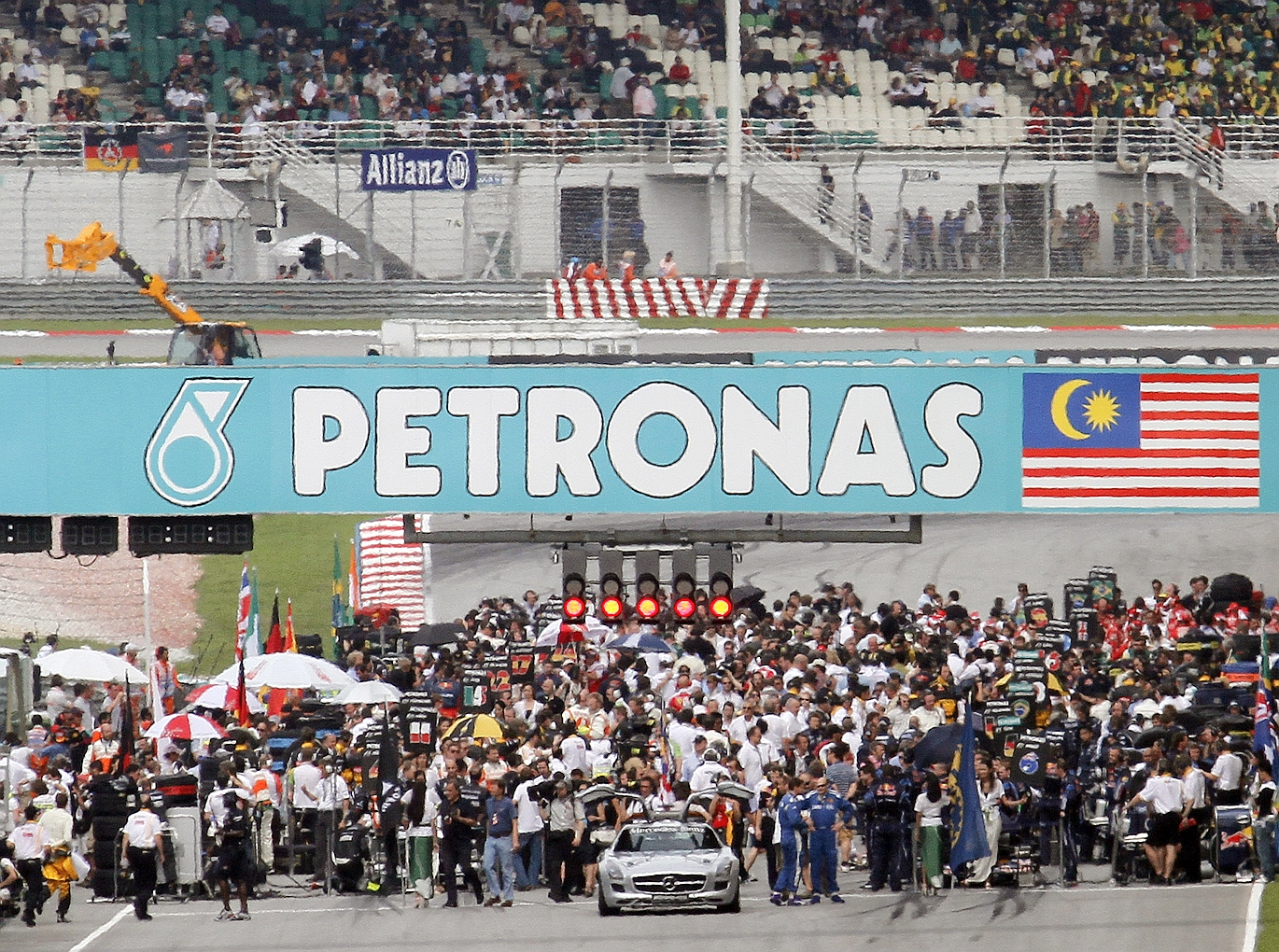
The starting grid of the Sepang International Circuit in 2010.

Malaysia's largest motorsports venue is the Sepang International Circuit in the Sepang district, which opened in 1999. The track hosted the Formula One Malaysian Grand Prix from 1999 to 2017.

A1 Team Malaysia was the Malaysian A1 Grand Prix team. Alex Yoong, Fairuz Fauzy, Nabil Jeffri, Jazeman Jaafar, Nazim Azman and Weiron Tan are among the top race car drivers in Malaysia.

In 2018, the Malaysian trio of Nabil Jeffri, Jazeman Jaafar and Weiron Tan won the 2018 6 Hours of Fuji in the LMP2 Class during the fourth round of 2018–19 FIA World Endurance Championship, becoming the first Malaysian drivers to win a FIA World Endurance Championship race.

The Malaysian motorcycle Grand Prix is part of the Grand Prix motorcycle racing season. Zulfahmi Khairuddin, Hafizh Syahrin and Khairul Idham Pawi are the top Malaysian motorcycle racers.

Khairul Idham Pawi became the first ever Malaysian to win a Grand Prix motorcycle racing in the Moto3 class in 2016 Moto3 in 2016 Argentine motorcycle Grand Prix at Autódromo Termas de Río Hondo and 2016 German motorcycle Grand Prix at Sachsenring.

Hafizh Syahrin became the first Malaysian and Southeast Asian rider to compete in the MotoGP premier class in 2018 for Yamaha Tech3 and 2019 for KTM Tech3.

=== Air sports ===
Paragliders Malaysia (PGMY), Malaysia Sports Aviation Federation (MSAF), Persatuan Luncur Udara Malaysia (PLUM), Persatuan Luncur Udara Terangganu (PLUT) and Persatuan Luncur Udara Sabah (PLUS) are among the many established organisations working together to develop the paragliding sport in Malaysia.

Several international paragliding competitions were held in Malaysia since 2013 such as Bahau International Paragliding Competition (2013), Jugra International Paragliding Accuracy Championship (2015), Paragliding Accuracy World Championship (2015).

== Team sports ==
=== Football ===
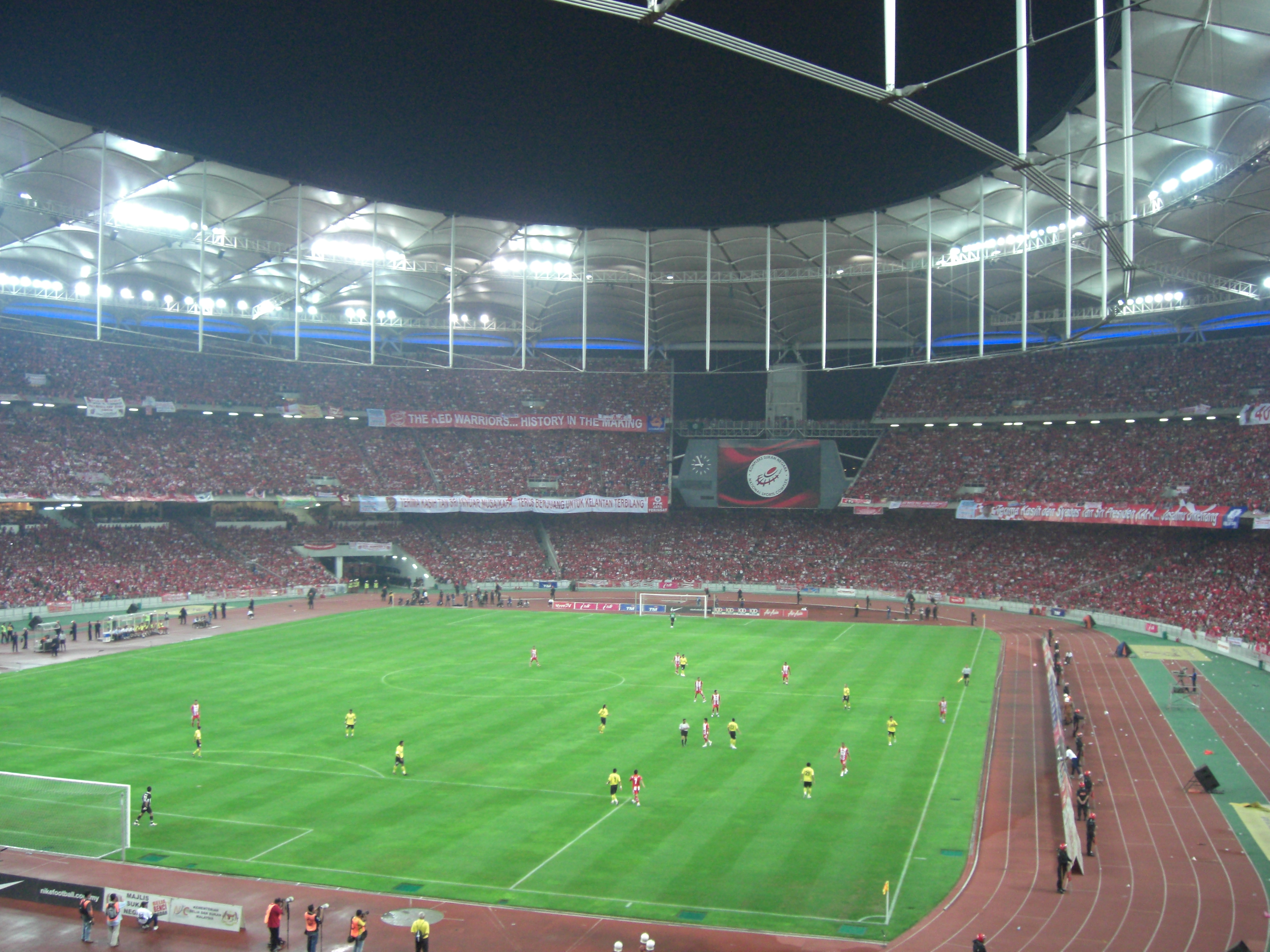
Bukit Jalil National Stadium

The Malaysia national football team (nicknamed Harimau Malaya) represents Malaysia at an international level. The national team captured the country's first major international football title when they became the champion of 2010 AFF Suzuki Cup. The Malaysia national under-23 football team won a gold medal in 2009 and 2011 Southeast Asian Games. The Malaysia national team has qualified for the Asian Cup in 1976, 1980 and 2007 AFC Asian Cup, however, they have never been able to go through to next stage. In the FIFA World Rankings, Malaysia's highest standing was in the first release of the figures, in August 1993, at 75th. It is ranked 153rd in the world and 31st in Asia (as of 18 February 2021). The Malaysia women's national football team is ranked 92nd in the world and 18th in Asia in the FIFA Women's World Rankings (as of 25 June 2021).

The Football Association of Malaysia (FAM) is the governing body for football in Malaysia. The home stadium of Malaysia national football team is the Bukit Jalil National Stadium. Malaysia Super League, Malaysia Premier League and Malaysia FAM League is a professional football league in Malaysia. Some of the major teams include: Melaka United F.C., Kelantan FA, Terengganu FA, Selangor FA, Penang FA, Kedah FA, Perak FA, Johor Darul Ta'zim F.C., Kuala Lumpur FA and Negeri Sembilan FA. Johor Darul Ta'zim as the 2016 Malaysia Super League champions and the 2016 Malaysia FA Cup then became the only club from Malaysia to become the 2015 AFC Cup champion after beating FC Istiklol 1–0.

In 2022 AFC Champions League, Johor Darul Ta'zim F.C. became the first club from Malaysia to reach the Round of 16 in AFC Champions League after beating the likes of Ulsan Hyundai FC, Kawasaki Frontale and Guangzhou Evergrande to top the group of Group I in 2022 AFC Champions League

=== Cricket ===
The Malaysia national cricket team represents Malaysia in international cricket. It is an associate member of the International Cricket Council (ICC) since 1967. Cricket has been played in what is now Malaysia since the 1880s. Various teams represented Malaya, the Federated Malay States and the Straits Settlements, formed in 1884 by the British. Royal Selangor Club (RSC) is the first cricket club founded in present Malaysia (locally called a padang also in Singapore e.g. Padang, Singapore). The Singapore Cricket Club, a former affiliate of the Malayan Cricket Association, is the oldest cricket club in the region (founded in 1852).

=== Sepaktakraw ===
Sepak Takraw in Malaysia is governed by Persatuan Sepaktakraw Malaysia (PSM). The men's team is ranked world number two in the ISTAF World Ranking (as of 13 November 2014). The women's team is ranked world number three in the ISTAF World Ranking (as of 13 November 2014).

=== Hockey ===
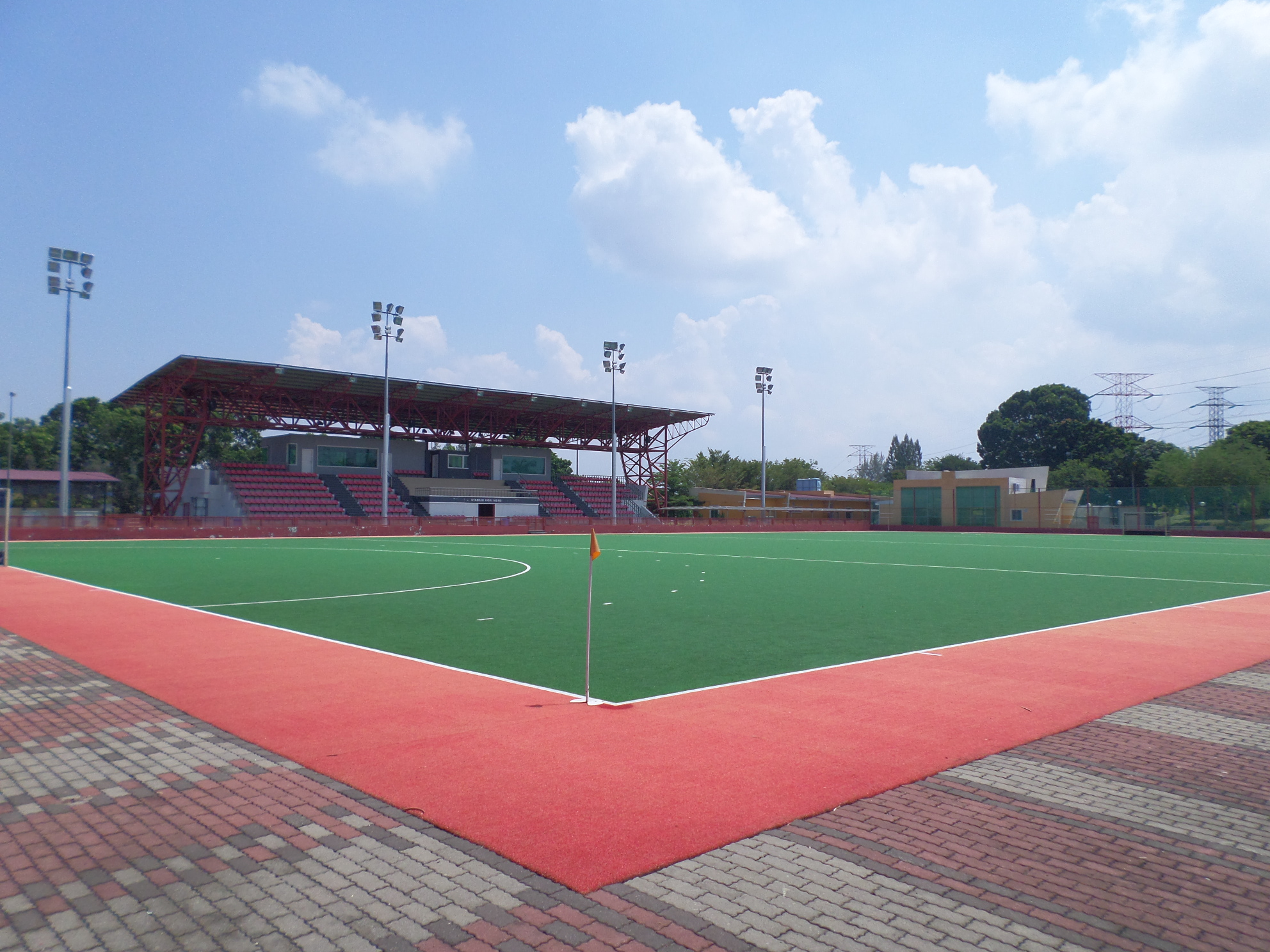
Hockey stadium in Malacca.

Malaysia was a founding member of the Asian Hockey Federation. The national team is Malaysia's representative in field hockey tournaments around the world. In the usual course of things, the team is made up of the best field hockey players in Malaysia. The governing body for the sports is the Malaysian Hockey Confederation. The Malaysia Hockey League (MHL) is a top league competition for field hockey clubs in the Malaysian hockey league system.

At the present time, the men's hockey team is ranked 13th in the world and 3rd in Asia in the FIH World Rankings (as of May 2019). The team won a silver medal in 2010 Asian Games. The Malaysia women's national field hockey team is ranked 22nd in the world and 5th in Asia in the FIH World Rankings (as of May 2019).

=== Basketball ===
Malaysia features multiple national teams for men and women, senior and junior levels. The women's national team has traditionally been more successful than the men's team as it has dominated the Women's tournament at the Southeast Asian Games on many occasions.

=== Netball ===
The Malaysia national netball team represents Malaysia in international competition. Malaysian Netball Association is the governing body for netball in Malaysia. The team is ranked 23rd in the world and 2nd in Asia in the INF World Rankings (as of 31 October 2014).

=== Rugby union ===
The Malaysia national rugby union team represents Malaysia in international rugby union. The governing body is the Malaysian Rugby Union. The team is ranked 50th in the world and 4th in Asia in the IRB World Rankings (as of 2 August 2021). Malaysia have yet to make their debut at the Rugby World Cup, but have attempted to qualify since the South African World Cup in 1995. MRU Super League is the top flight of rugby union league in Malaysia.

== Major sport events ==
Malaysia participates in international sporting events such as the Olympic Games, the Asian Games, the Commonwealth Games and the Southeast Asian Games. Malaysia has hosted the 1998 Commonwealth Games and came in fourth place in the medal tally. Malaysia also has hosted Southeast Asian Games five times and has become the overall champion in the gold medal tally in the 2001 Southeast Asian Games. Malaysian athletes have won a total of eleven Olympic medals, in badminton, cycling and diving.

=== National Sports Day ===
The National Sports Day (Malay: Hari Sukan Negara) is a national sports day in Malaysia, held annually on the second Saturday in October, with the main objective of promoting a healthy lifestyle among its population. The first National Sports Day was held in 2015.

=== Sukma Games ===
The Sukma Games (Malay: Sukan Malaysia) are a national biannual multi-sport event held since 1986, involving young athletes from Malaysian 13 member states and the Federal territory. The games is regulated by the National Sports Council of Malaysia, the state sports council of the respective member states, the Olympic Council of Malaysia and the National Sports association of the games respective sporting event.

=== Para Sukma Games ===
Para Sukma Games (Malay: Para Sukan Malaysia), are a multi-sport event held for Malaysian athletes with disabilities. The games was previously known as the National Games of Malaysia For the Disabled (Malay: Sukan Kebangsaan Bagi Orang Cacat Anggota Malaysia) from 1982 until 1998 and the Malaysian Paralympiad (Malay: Paralimpiad Malaysia) from 1998 until 2018 and held separately with Sukma Games until 2010.

=== Sopma Games ===
Sopma Games (Malay: Sukan Orang Pekak Malaysia) are a national biannual event held for deaf athletes. It was previously known as the Deaf Interclub Sports Championship (Malay: Kejohanan Sukan Antara Kelab Pekak, KSAKP) from 1985 until 1990 and the National Deaf Games (Malay: Sukan Kebangsaan Orang Pekak, SKOP) from 1990 until 2009.

| Edition | Year | Host | Teams | Competitors | Sports |
|---|---|---|---|---|---|
| KSAKP I | 1985 | Kuala Lumpur | 4 | 127 | 2 |
| KSAKP II | 1986 | Penang | 5 | 100 | 2 |
| KSAKP III | 1987 | Selangor | 4 | 111 | 3 |
| KSAKP IV | 1988 | Kedah | 4 | 80 | 3 |
| KSAKP V | 1989 | Kuala Lumpur | 5 | 102 | 3 |
| SKOP VI | 1990 | Johor | 10 | 250 | 5 |
| SKOP VII | 1991 | Selangor | 9 | 320 | 7 |
| SKOP VIII | 1992 | Penang | 10 | 325 | 6 |
| SKOP IX | 1993 | Pahang | 7 | 313 | 4 |
| SKOP X | 1995 | Kedah | 9 | 450 | 5 |
| SKOP XI | 1997 | Selangor | 8 | 330 | 5 |
| SKOP XII | 1999 | Johor | 8 | 410 | 4 |
| SKOP XIII | 2001 | Kelantan | 12 | 560 | 7 |
| SKOP XIV | 2003 | Kedah | 13 | 620 | 7 |
| SKOP XV | 2006 | Perak | 11 | 394 | 5 |
| SOPMA XVI | 2009 | Terengganu | 11 | 243 | 4 |
| SOPMA XVII | 2012 | Kuala Lumpur | 13 | 600 | 5 |
| SOPMA XVIII | 2014 | Malacca | 14 | 734 | 7 |
| SOPMA XIX | 2016 | Sarawak | 12 | 980 | 4 |
| SOPMA XX | 2018 | Perak | 14 | 1000 | 5 |

=== Olympics, Paralympics and Deaflympics ===
Malaysia first participated at the 1964 Summer Olympics, and has sent athletes to compete in every Summer Olympic Games since then, except the 1980 Summer Olympics, which it boycotted. Malaysia, since 2018, has taken part in the Winter Olympic Games. The Olympic Council of Malaysia is the National Olympic Committee for Malaysia. Malaysian athletes have won a total of eleven medals at the Summer Olympic Games. Eight medals have been won in badminton, two medals have been won in diving and one medal has been won in cycling.

Malaysia made its Paralympic Games debut at the 1972 Summer Paralympics. The country was then absent for three consecutive editions of the Summer Paralympics, before making its return at the 1988 Summer Paralympics. Malaysia has participated in every subsequent edition of the Summer Paralympics, but has never entered the Winter Paralympics. Malaysian Paralympic Council is the National Paralympic Committee for Malaysia. Malaysian athletes have won a total of seven medals at the Paralympic Games: three gold, two silver and five bronze.

Malaysia first participated at the 1993 Summer Deaflympics, and has sent athletes to compete in every Summer Deaflympic Games since then, except the 1997 and the 2013 Summer Deaflympics. The nation has never competed at the Winter Deaflympics. Malaysian Deaf Sports Association is the governing body of deaf sports for Malaysia. Malaysian athletes have won a total of eleven medals at the Deaflympic Games: one gold, seven silver and three bronze.

=== Hosted sports competitions ===
Commonwealth Games

- 1998 Commonwealth Games
Southeast Asian Games

- 1965 Southeast Asian Peninsular Games
- 1971 Southeast Asian Peninsular Games
- 1977 Southeast Asian Games
- 1989 Southeast Asian Games
- 2001 Southeast Asian Games
- 2017 Southeast Asian Games
Association football

- 2007 AFC Asian Cup
- Merdeka Tournament
- Malaysia Super League
- Malaysia Premier League
- Malaysia FAM League
- Malaysia Cup
- Malaysia FA Cup
- Sultan Haji Ahmad Shah Cup
- Malaysian President's Cup
Athletics

- 1991 Asian Athletics Championships
- 2004 Asian Junior Athletics Championships
Badminton

- 1970 Thomas Cup
- 1984 Thomas & Uber Cup
- 1988 Thomas & Uber Cup
- 1992 Thomas & Uber Cup
- 2000 Thomas & Uber Cup
- 2010 Thomas & Uber Cup
- 2007 BWF World Championships
- Malaysia Super Series
- Malaysia Open Grand Prix Gold
- Malaysian National Badminton Championships
Baseball

- Malaysian All-Star League Baseball
Basketball

- 1998 ABC Champions Cup
- 2002 ABC Champions Cup
- 2003 ABC Champions Cup
- Malaysia National Basketball League
Cycling

- Tour de Langkawi
- Jelajah Malaysia
- Tour de Borneo
- Melaka Governor Cup
Darts

- Malaysian Open (darts)
Field hockey

- Sultan Azlan Shah Cup
- Malaysia Hockey League
- Malaysia Junior Hockey League
Futsal

- National Futsal League Malaysia
- Women's National Futsal League Malaysia
Golf

- Malaysian Open (golf)
- Iskandar Johor Open
- CIMB Classic
Ice hockey

- Malaysian Ice Hockey League
Karate

- 1994 World Karate Championships
- 2007 Asian Karate Championships
Marathon

- Borneo International Marathon
- Kuala Lumpur Marathon
- Penang Bridge International Marathon
- Sultan Mahmud International Bridge Run
Motor sports

- Malaysian motorcycle Grand Prix
- Malaysian Formula One Grand Prix
- Kuala Lumpur City Grand Prix
Mixed martial arts

- Malaysian Invasion Mixed Martial Arts
Rugby union

- MRU Super League
Sailing

- Monsoon Cup
Squash

- Kuala Lumpur Open Squash Championships
- Malaysian Open Squash Championships
Tennis

- ATP Malaysian Open
- BMW Malaysian Open
Wushu

- 2013 World Wushu Championships
ASEAN Para Games

- 2001 ASEAN Para Games
- 2009 ASEAN Para Games
- 2017 ASEAN Para Games

== Sport media in Malaysia ==
On 28 July 1984, TV3 became the first commercial channel in collaboration with RTM bringing Malaysians the live coverage of the Los Angeles Olympics.

On 25 March 2010, Astro Arena, the country's first local sports channel went on air. Astro Arena (Channel 801) a 24-hour local sports channel will be delivered predominantly in Malay and available to all Astro customers under its Family Pack..

== See also ==
- Anugerah Sukan Negara
- List of Malaysian records in archery
- List of Malaysian records in athletics
- List of Malaysian records in swimming
