= 2013 Jelajah Malaysia =

2013 Jelajah 1Malaysia
2012–13 UCI Asia Tour

Race details
- Dates: 26–30 June 2013
- Stages: 5
- Distance: 856.1 km (532.0 mi)
- Winning time: 20h 11' 58"

Results
Jersey awarded to the overall winner	Winner	Loh Sea Keong (MAS)	(OCBC Singapore Continental; Cycling Team)
	Second	Sergey Kuzmin (KAZ)	(Polygon Sweet Nice Team)
	Third	Kiril Pozdnyakov (RUS)	(Synergy Baku Cycling Project)
Jersey awarded to the points classification winner	Points	Mohamed Harrif Salleh (MAS)	(Terengganu Cycling Team)
Jersey awarded to the mountains classification winner	Mountains	Mohamed Zamri Salleh (MAS)	(Terengganu Cycling Team)
	Team	Synergy Baku Cycling Project	

The 2013 Jelajah Malaysia, a cycling stage race that took place in Malaysia. It was held from 26 to 30 June 2013. There were five stages with a total of 856.1 kilometres. In fact, the race was sanctioned by the Union Cycliste Internationale as a 2.2 category race and was part of the 2012–13 UCI Asia Tour calendar.

Loh Sea Keong of Malaysia won the race, followed by Sergey Kuzmin of Kazakhstan second and Kiril Pozdnyakov of Russia third overall. Mohamed Harrif Salleh of Malaysia won the points classification and Mohamed Zamri Salleh of Malaysia won the mountains classification. Synergy Baku Cycling Project won the team classification.

== Stages ==
Stage	Date	Course	Distance	Stage result		
Stage	Date	Course	Distance	Winner	Second	Third
1	26 June	National Sports Complex, Bukit Jalil to Rembau	187.7 km (116.6 mi)	Kiril Pozdnyakov (RUS)	Adiq Husainie Othman (MAS)	Kazushige Kuboki (JPN)
2	27 June	Rembau to Batu Pahat	197.6 km (122.8 mi)	Aaron Donnelly (AUS)	Lex Nederlof (NED)	Loh Sea Keong (MAS)
3	28 June	Batu Pahat to Pontian	94.7 km (58.8 mi)	Mohamed Harrif Salleh (MAS)	Paul Van Der Ploeg (AUS)	Mohamed Zamri Salleh (MAS)
4	29 June	Plaza Angsana, Johor Bahru to Bukit Katil, Malacca	206.3 km (128.2 mi)	Anthony Giacoppo (AUS)	Mohamed Harrif Salleh (MAS)	Mariusz Wiesiak (POL)
5	30 June	Bukit Katil, Malacca to Putra Square, Putrajaya	169.8 km (105.5 mi)	Samir Jabrayilov (AZE)	Ronald Oranza (PHI)	Galedo Mark Lexer (PHI)

== Classification leadership ==
Stage	Stage winner	General classification	Points classification	Mountains classification	Asian rider classification	Malaysian rider classification	Team classification	Asian team classification	Malaysian team classification
1	Kiril Pozdnyakov	Kiril Pozdnyakov	Adiq Husainie Othman	Adiq Husainie Othman	Adiq Husainie Othman	Adiq Husainie Othman	Synergy Baku Cycling Project	Matrix Powertag	Malaysia National Cycling Team
2	Aaron Donnelly	Loh Sea Keong	Loh Sea Keong	Rustom Lim	Loh Sea Keong	Loh Sea Keong	OCBC Singapore Continental Cycling Team	Matrix Powertag	PDRM Cycling Team
3	Mohamed Harrif Salleh	Loh Sea Keong	Mohamed Harrif Salleh	Rustom Lim	Loh Sea Keong	Loh Sea Keong	OCBC Singapore Continental Cycling Team	Matrix Powertag	PDRM Cycling Team
4	Anthony Giacoppo	Loh Sea Keong	Mohamed Harrif Salleh	Mohamed Zamri Salleh	Loh Sea Keong	Loh Sea Keong	OCBC Singapore Continental Cycling Team	Matrix Powertag	PDRM Cycling Team
5	Samir Jabrayilov	Loh Sea Keong	Mohamed Harrif Salleh	Mohamed Zamri Salleh	Loh Sea Keong	Loh Sea Keong	Synergy Baku Cycling Project	Matrix Powertag	PDRM Cycling Team
Final		Loh Sea Keong	Mohamed Harrif Salleh	Mohamed Zamri Salleh	Loh Sea Keong	Loh Sea Keong	Synergy Baku Cycling Project	Matrix Powertag	PDRM Cycling Team

== Stage results ==
=== Stage 1 ===
26 June 2013 — National Sports Complex, Bukit Jalil to Rembau, 187.7 km (116.6 mi)

Stage 1 Result

	Rider	Team	Time
1	Kiril Pozdnyakov (RUS)	Synergy Baku Cycling Project	4h 13' 40"
2	Adiq Husainie Othman (MAS)	Malaysia National Cycling Team	+ 12"
3	Kazushige Kuboki (JPN)	Matrix Powertag	+ 12"
4	Elchin Asadov (AZE)	Synergy Baku Cycling Project	+ 12"
5	Sergey Kuzmin (KAZ)	Polygon Sweet Nice Team	+ 12"
6	Samuel Davis (AUS)	Huon Salmon–Genesys Wealth Advisers	+ 12"
7	Loh Sea Keong (MAS)	OCBC Singapore Continental Cycling Team	+ 12"
8	Mohd Fauzan Ahmad Lutfi (MAS)	PDRM Cycling Team	+ 17"
9	Mohd Harrif Saleh (MAS)	Terengganu Cycling Team	+ 1' 50"
10	Paul Van Der Ploeg (AUS)	Team Corbusier	+ 1' 50"

General Classification after Stage 1

	Rider	Team	Time
1	Kiril Pozdnyakov (RUS)	Synergy Baku Cycling Project	4h 13' 30"
2	Adiq Husainie Othman (MAS)	Malaysia National Cycling Team	+ 12"
3	Kazushige Kuboki (JPN)	Matrix Powertag	+ 18"
4	Elchin Asadov (AZE)	Synergy Baku Cycling Project	+ 22"
5	Sergey Kuzmin (KAZ)	Polygon Sweet Nice Team	+ 22"
6	Samuel Davis (AUS)	Huon Salmon–Genesys Wealth Advisers	+ 22"
7	Loh Sea Keong (MAS)	OCBC Singapore Continental Cycling Team	+ 22"
8	Mohd Fauzan Ahmad Lutfi (MAS)	PDRM Cycling Team	+ 27"
9	Mohd Harrif Saleh (MAS)	Terengganu Cycling Team	+ 1' 54"
10	Mariusz Wiesiak (POL)	Matrix Powertag	+ 1' 59"

=== Stage 2 ===
27 June 2013 — Rembau to Batu Pahat, 197.6 km (122.8 mi)

Stage 2 Result

	Rider	Team	Time
1	Aaron Donnelly (AUS)	Huon Salmon–Genesys Wealth Advisers	4h 44' 53"
2	Lex Nederlof (NED)	CCN Cycling Team	+ 3"
3	Loh Sea Keong (MAS)	OCBC Singapore Continental Cycling Team	+ 9"
4	Jason Christie (NZL)	OCBC Singapore Continental Cycling Team	+ 9"
5	Mohamad Faris Abdul Razak (MAS)	PDRM Cycling Team	+ 13"
6	Muhamad Rauf Nur Misbah (MAS)	Malaysia National Cycling Team	+ 13"
7	Mark Galedo (PHI)	Team 7 Eleven Presented By Roadbike Philippines	+ 13"
8	Mohd Saiful Anuar Aziz (MAS)	Terengganu Cycling Team	+ 13"
9	Aldi Apriani (INA)	Customs Cycling Club	+ 19"
10	Sergey Kuzmin (KAZ)	Polygon Sweet Nice Team	+ 19"

General Classification after Stage 2

	Rider	Team	Time
1	Loh Sea Keong (MAS)	OCBC Singapore Continental Cycling Team	8h 58' 50"
2	Sergey Kuzmin (KAZ)	Polygon Sweet Nice Team	+ 14"
3	Kiril Pozdnyakov (RUS)	Synergy Baku Cycling Project	+ 41"
4	Adiq Husainie Othman (MAS)	Malaysia National Cycling Team	+ 53"
5	Kazushige Kuboki (JPN)	Matrix Powertag	+ 59"
6	Elchin Asadov (AZE)	Synergy Baku Cycling Project	+ 1' 03"
7	Samuel Davis (AUS)	Huon Salmon–Genesys Wealth Advisers	+ 1' 03"
8	Mohd Fauzan Ahmad Lutfi (MAS)	PDRM Cycling Team	+ 1' 08"
9	Lex Nederlof (NED)	CCN Cycling Team	+ 1' 30"
10	Jason Christie (NZL)	OCBC Singapore Continental Cycling Team	+ 1' 42"

=== Stage 3 ===
28 June 2013 — Batu Pahat to Pontian, 94.7 km (58.8 mi)

Stage 3 Result

	Rider	Team	Time
1	Mohd Harrif Saleh (MAS)	Terengganu Cycling Team	2h 08' 11"
2	Paul Van Der Ploeg (AUS)	Team Corbusier	s.t.
3	Mohamed Zamri Salleh (MAS)	Terengganu Cycling Team	s.t.
4	Brenton Jones (AUS)	Huon Salmon–Genesys Wealth Advisers	s.t.
5	Anthony Giacoppo (AUS)	Huon Salmon–Genesys Wealth Advisers	s.t.
6	Ahmad Haidar Anuawar (MAS)	OCBC Singapore Continental Cycling Team	s.t.
7	Adiq Husainie Othman (MAS)	Malaysia National Cycling Team	s.t.
8	Lex Nederlof (NED)	CCN Cycling Team	s.t.
9	Low Ji Wen (SIN)	OCBC Singapore Continental Cycling Team	s.t.
10	Mohamad Faris Abdul Razak (MAS)	PDRM Cycling Team	s.t.

General Classification after Stage 3

	Rider	Team	Time
1	Loh Sea Keong (MAS)	OCBC Singapore Continental Cycling Team	11h 07' 01"
2	Sergey Kuzmin (KAZ)	Polygon Sweet Nice Team	+ 14"
3	Kiril Pozdnyakov (RUS)	Synergy Baku Cycling Project	+ 41"
4	Adiq Husainie Othman (MAS)	Malaysia National Cycling Team	+ 53"
5	Kazushige Kuboki (JPN)	Matrix Powertag	+ 59"
6	Elchin Asadov (AZE)	Synergy Baku Cycling Project	+ 1' 03"
7	Samuel Davis (AUS)	Huon Salmon–Genesys Wealth Advisers	+ 1' 03"
8	Mohd Fauzan Ahmad Lutfi (MAS)	PDRM Cycling Team	+ 1' 08"
9	Lex Nederlof (NED)	CCN Cycling Team	+ 1' 30"
10	Jason Christie (NZL)	OCBC Singapore Continental Cycling Team	+ 1' 42"

=== Stage 4 ===
29 June 2013 — Plaza Angsana, Johor Bahru to Bukit Katil, Malacca, 206.3 km (128.2 mi)

Stage 4 Result

	Rider	Team	Time
1	Anthony Giacoppo (AUS)	Huon Salmon–Genesys Wealth Advisers	5h 03' 23"
2	Mohd Harrif Saleh (MAS)	Terengganu Cycling Team	s.t.
3	Mariusz Wiesiak (POL)	Matrix Powertag	s.t.
4	Mohd Nur Rizuan Zainal (MAS)	ATM Cycling Team	s.t.
5	Adiq Husainie Othman (MAS)	Malaysia National Cycling Team	s.t.
6	Paul Van Der Ploeg (NED)	Team Corbusier	s.t.
7	Endre Wijaya (INA)	Customs Cycling Club	s.t.
8	Mohamad Faris Abdul Razak (MAS)	PDRM Cycling Team	s.t.
9	Hamdan Hamidun (MAS)	Majlis Sukan Negara	s.t.
10	Muhammed Syafiq Syazwan Zainuddin (MAS)	Majlis Sukan Negara	s.t.

General Classification after Stage 4

	Rider	Team	Time
1	Loh Sea Keong (MAS)	OCBC Singapore Continental Cycling Team	16h 10' 24"
2	Sergey Kuzmin (KAZ)	Polygon Sweet Nice Team	+ 14"
3	Kiril Pozdnyakov (RUS)	Synergy Baku Cycling Project	+ 41"
4	Adiq Husainie Othman (MAS)	Malaysia National Cycling Team	+ 53"
5	Kazushige Kuboki (JPN)	Matrix Powertag	+ 59"
6	Elchin Asadov (AZE)	Synergy Baku Cycling Project	+ 1' 00"
7	Samuel Davis (AUS)	Huon Salmon–Genesys Wealth Advisers	+ 1' 03"
8	Mohd Fauzan Ahmad Lutfi (MAS)	PDRM Cycling Team	+ 1' 08"
9	Lex Nederlof (NED)	CCN Cycling Team	+ 1' 30"
10	Jason Christie (NZL)	OCBC Singapore Continental Cycling Team	+ 1' 42"

=== Stage 5 ===
30 June 2013 — Bukit Katil, Malacca to Putra Square, Putrajaya, 169.8 km (105.5 mi)

Stage 5 Result

	Rider	Team	Time
1	Samir Jabrayilov (AZE)	Synergy Baku Cycling Project	4h 01' 23"
2	Ronald Oranza (PHI)	LBC-MVPSF Cycling Pilipinas	s.t.
3	Mark Galedo (PHI)	Team 7 Eleven Presented By Roadbike Philippines	s.t.
4	Mohd Harrif Saleh (MAS)	Terengganu Cycling Team	+ 11"
5	Mohamed Zamri Salleh (MAS)	Terengganu Cycling Team	+ 11"
6	Anthony Giacoppo (AUS)	Huon Salmon–Genesys Wealth Advisers	+ 11"
7	Rustom Lim (PHI)	LBC-MVPSF Cycling Pilipinas	+ 11"
8	Mariusz Wiesiak (POL)	Matrix Powertag	+ 11"
9	Ronnel Hualda (PHI)	Team 7 Eleven Presented By Roadbike Philippines	+ 11"
10	Caleb Jones (AUS)	CCN Cycling Team	+ 11"

Final General Classification

	Rider	Team	Time
1	Loh Sea Keong (MAS)	OCBC Singapore Continental Cycling Team	20h 11' 58"
2	Sergey Kuzmin (KAZ)	Polygon Sweet Nice Team	+ 14"
3	Kiril Pozdnyakov (RUS)	Synergy Baku Cycling Project	+ 41"
4	Adiq Husainie Othman (MAS)	Malaysia National Cycling Team	+ 53"
5	Kazushige Kuboki (JPN)	Matrix Powertag	+ 59"
6	Elchin Asadov (AZE)	Synergy Baku Cycling Project	+ 1' 00"
7	Samuel Davis (AUS)	Huon Salmon–Genesys Wealth Advisers	+ 1' 03"
8	Mohd Fauzan Ahmad Lutfi (MAS)	PDRM Cycling Team	+ 1' 08"
9	Mark Galedo (PHI)	Team 7 Eleven Presented By Roadbike Philippines	+ 1' 28"
10	Lex Nederlof (NED)	CCN Cycling Team	+ 1' 30"

== Final standings ==
=== General classification ===
	Rider	Team	Time
1	(Malaysia) Loh Sea Keong	OCBC Singapore Continental Cycling Team	20h 11' 58"
2	(Kazakhstan) Sergey Kuzmin	Polygon Sweet Nice Team	+ 14"
3	(Russia) Kiril Pozdnyakov	Synergy Baku Cycling Project	+ 41"
4	(Malaysia) Adiq Husainie Othman	Malaysia National Cycling Team	+ 53"
5	(Japan) Kazushige Kuboki	Matrix Powertag	+ 59"
6	(Azerbaijan) Elchin Asadov	Synergy Baku Cycling Project	+ 1' 00"
7	(Australia) Samuel Davis	Huon Salmon–Genesys Wealth Advisers	+ 1' 03"
8	(Malaysia) Mohd Fauzan Ahmad Lutfi	PDRM Cycling Team	+ 1' 08"
9	(Philippines) Mark Galedo	Team 7 Eleven Presented By Roadbike Philippines	+ 1' 28"
10	(Netherlands) Lex Nederlof	CCN Cycling Team	+ 1' 30"

=== Points classification ===
	Rider	Team	Points
1	(Malaysia) Mohd Harrif Saleh	Terengganu Cycling Team	66
2	(Malaysia) Adiq Husainie Othman	Malaysia National Cycling Team	45
3	(Australia) Paul Van Der Ploeg	Team Corbusier	37
4	(Australia) Anthony Giacoppo	Huon Salmon–Genesys Wealth Advisers	36
5	(Poland) Mariusz Wiesiak	Matrix Powertag	29
6	(Philippines) Mark Galedo	Team 7 Eleven Presented By Roadbike Philippines	27
7	(Malaysia) Mohamad Faris Abdul Razak	PDRM Cycling Team	25
8	(Philippines) Ronald Oranza	LBC-MVPSF Cycling Pilipinas	24
9	(Malaysia) Mohamed Zamri Salleh	Terengganu Cycling Team	24
10	(Malaysia) Loh Sea Keong	OCBC Singapore Continental Cycling Team	22

=== Mountains classification ===
	Rider	Team	Points
1	(Malaysia) Mohamed Zamri Salleh	Terengganu Cycling Team	9
2	(Philippines) Rustom Lim	LBC-MVPSF Cycling Pilipinas	6
3	(Malaysia) Adiq Husainie Othman	Malaysia National Cycling Team	4
4	(Philippines) Ronnel Hualda	Team 7 Eleven Presented By Roadbike Philippines	4
5	(Malaysia) Mohd Salahuddin Mat Saman	PDRM Cycling Team	2
6	(Philippines) Ronald Oranza	LBC-MVPSF Cycling Pilipinas	2
7	(Australia) Paul Van Der Ploeg	Team Corbusier	2
8	(Indonesia) Endre Wijaya	Customs Cycling Club	2
9	(Malaysia) Sofian Nabil Omar Mohd Bakri	Majlis Sukan Negara	2
10	(Malaysia) Mohamad Azrul Taufiq Annuar	Team Corbusier	1

=== Team classification ===
	Team	Time
1	Synergy Baku Cycling Project	60h 40' 18"
2	OCBC Singapore Continental Cycling Team	+ 3"
3	Huon Salmon–Genesys Wealth Advisers	+ 53"
4	Matrix Powertag	+ 2' 01"
5	PDRM Cycling Team	+ 12' 55"
6	Malaysia National Cycling Team	+ 14' 12"
7	CCN Cycling Team	+ 15' 10"
8	Terengganu Cycling Team	+ 15' 41"
9	Polygon Sweet Nice Team	+ 17' 48"
10	LBC-MVPSF Cycling Pilipinas	+ 28' 27"

=== Asian rider classification ===
	Rider	Team	Time
1	(Malaysia) Loh Sea Keong	OCBC Singapore Continental Cycling Team	20h 11' 58"
2	(Kazakhstan) Sergey Kuzmin	Polygon Sweet Nice Team	+ 14"
3	(Malaysia) Adiq Husainie Othman	Malaysia National Cycling Team	+ 53"
4	(Japan) Kazushige Kuboki	Matrix Powertag	+ 59"
5	(Malaysia) Mohd Fauzan Ahmad Lutfi	PDRM Cycling Team	+ 1' 08"
6	(Philippines) Mark Galedo	Team 7 Eleven Presented By Roadbike Philippines	+ 1' 28"
7	(Philippines) Ronald Oranza	LBC-MVPSF Cycling Pilipinas	+ 1' 44"
8	(Malaysia) Muhamad Rauf Nur Misbah	Malaysia National Cycling Team	+ 1' 46"
9	(Malaysia) Mohd Harrif Saleh	Terengganu Cycling Team	+ 2' 14"
10	(Malaysia) Mohd Salahuddin Mat Saman	PDRM Cycling Team	+ 2' 15"

=== Asian team classification ===
	Team	Time
1	Matrix Powertag	60h 42' 40"
2	PDRM Cycling Team	+ 10' 33"
3	OCBC Singapore Continental Cycling Team	+ 11' 07"
4	Malaysia National Cycling Team	+ 11' 50"
5	Terengganu Cycling Team	+ 13' 19"
6	LBC-MVPSF Cycling Pilipinas	+ 26' 05"
7	Team 7 Eleven Presented By Roadbike Philippines	+ 26' 06"
8	Customs Cycling Club	+ 26' 11"
9	Majlis Sukan Negara	+ 27' 04"
10	CCN Cycling Team	+ 27' 25"

=== Malaysian rider classification ===
	Rider	Team	Time
1	Loh Sea Keong	OCBC Singapore Continental Cycling Team	20h 11' 58"
2	Adiq Husainie Othman	Malaysia National Cycling Team	+ 53"
3	Mohd Fauzan Ahmad Lutfi	PDRM Cycling Team	+ 1' 08"
4	Muhamad Rauf Nur Misbah	Malaysia National Cycling Team	+ 1' 46"
5	Mohd Harrif Saleh	Terengganu Cycling Team	+ 2' 14"
6	Mohd Salahuddin Mat Saman	PDRM Cycling Team	+ 2' 15"
7	Sofian Nabil Omar Mohd Bakri	Majlis Sukan Negara	+ 2' 40"
8	Nur Amirul Fakhruddin Marzuki	Terengganu Cycling Team	+ 4' 06"
9	Mohd Salahuddin Mat Saman	PDRM Cycling Team	+ 14' 15"
10	Mohd Nur Rizuan Zainal	ATM Cycling Team	+ 15' 07"

=== Malaysian team classification ===
	Team	Time
1	PDRM Cycling Team	60h 53' 13"
2	Malaysia National Cycling Team	+ 1' 17"
3	Terengganu Cycling Team	+ 2' 46"
4	Majlis Sukan Negara	+ 16' 31"
5	Negeri Sembilan State Cycling Team	+ 31' 30"
6	Terengganu State Cycling Team	+ 32' 53"
7	ATM Cycling Team	+ 34' 36"

== List of teams and riders ==
A total of 20 teams were invited to participate in the 2013 Jelajah Malaysia. Out of 116 riders, a total of 107 riders made it to the finish in Putra Square, Putrajaya.

(Malaysia) Terengganu Cycling Team

- (Malaysia) Mohamed Harrif Salleh
- (Malaysia) Mohamed Zamri Salleh
- (Malaysia) Mohd Saiful Anuar Aziz
- (Malaysia) Mohd Shahrul Mat Amin
- (Malaysia) Yusrizal Usoff
- (Malaysia) Nur Amirul Fakhruddin Marzuki

(Azerbaijan) Synergy Baku Cycling Project

- (Denmark) John Kronborg Ebsen
- (Russia) Kiril Pozdnyakov
- (Azerbaijan) Samir Jabrayilov
- (Azerbaijan) Aqshin Ismayilov
- (Azerbaijan) Tural Isgandarov
- (Azerbaijan) Elchin Asadov

(Brunei) CCN Cycling Team

- (Netherlands) Lex Nederlof
- (Australia) Caleb Jones
- (Chinese Taipei) Wang Yin-Chih
- (United States) Robert Gitelis
- (Indonesia) Fito Bakdo Prilanji
- (Indonesia) Hari Fitrianto

(Australia) Huon Salmon–Genesys Wealth Advisers

- (Australia) Anthony Giacoppo
- (Australia) Jack Beckinsale
- (Australia) Aaron Donnelly
- (Australia) Samuel Davis (cyclist)
- (Australia) Brenton Jones
- (Australia) Tom Robinson

(Japan) Matrix Powertag

- (Poland) Mariusz Wiesiak
- (Japan) Kazushige Kuboki
- (South Korea) Kim Do-Hyeong
- (Japan) Naoki Mukaigawa
- (Japan) Sota Ikebe

OCBC Singapore Continental Cycling Team

- (Malaysia) Ahmad Haidar Anuawar
- (Singapore) Low Ji Wen
- (Singapore) Ho Jun Rong
- (Singapore) Goh Choon Huat
- (New Zealand) Jason Christie
- (Malaysia) Loh Sea Keong

Team 7 Eleven Presented By Roadbike Philippines

- (Philippines) Ronnel Hualda
- (Philippines) Jonipher Ravina
- (Philippines) Galedo Mark Lexer
- (Philippines) John Mark Camingao
- (Philippines) Jerry Aquino Jr.

(Philippines) LBC-MVPSF Cycling Pilipinas

- (Philippines) Ronald Oranza
- (Philippines) Rustom Lim
- (Philippines) El Joshua Carino
- (Philippines) Jemico Brioso
- (Philippines) Junrey A Navarra
- (Philippines) Denver Casayuran

(Indonesia) Polygon Sweet Nice Team

- (Spain) Edgar Nohales Nieto
- (Indonesia) Dealton Nur Arif Prayoga
- (Indonesia) Agung Riyanto
- (Indonesia) Jimmy Pranata
- (Indonesia) Antonius Christopher Tjondrokusumo
- (Kazakhstan) Sergey Kuzmin

Malaysia National Cycling Team

- (Malaysia) Ahmad Fakhrullah Alias
- (Malaysia) Ahmad Fahmi Farhan Ahmad Fuat
- (Malaysia) Muhd Nasrullah Ismanizam
- (Malaysia) Muhamad Rauf Nur Misbah
- (Malaysia) Adiq Husainie Othman
- (Malaysia) Shahrin Amir

Bahrain National Cycling Team

- (Bahrain) Mansoor Mohamed
- (Bahrain) Maki Hussain Mohammed
- (Bahrain) Ismail Isa Ayoob
- (Bahrain) Alawi Sayed Ahmed Khalil
- (Bahrain) Adnan Taha Sayed Alawi
- (Bahrain) Salman Ali Abdul Abbas

Singapore National Cycling Team

- (Singapore) Ang Kee Meng
- (Singapore) Syed Amir Haziq Syed Ahmad
- (Singapore) Joel Foo Yuan Sheng
- (Singapore) Alan Soh Yoong Han
- (Singapore) Danny Feng

Team Putra Perjuangan Bandung Indonesia

- (Indonesia) Elan Riyadi
- (Indonesia) Chelly Aristya
- (Indonesia) Tonton Susanto
- (Indonesia) Arin Iswana
- (Indonesia) Suherman Haryadi
- (Indonesia) Rastra Patria Dinawan

(Indonesia) Customs Cycling Club

- (Indonesia) Endre Wijaya
- (Indonesia) Agung Ali Sahbana
- (Indonesia) Heksa Priya Prasetya
- (Indonesia) Muhamad Nur Fathoni
- (Indonesia) Aldi Apriani
- (Indonesia) Jefri Irawan

(Malaysia) Negeri Sembilan State Cycling Team

- (Malaysia) Mohammad Fairet Rusli
- (Malaysia) Amirul Anuar Jefri
- (Malaysia) Mohd Ekbar Zamanhuri
- (Malaysia) Abdul Rashid Ibrahim
- (Malaysia) Muhamad Zul Ashraf Zamlan
- (Malaysia) Muhamad Nur Syafiq Suhaimy

(Malaysia) Terengganu State Cycling Team

- (Malaysia) Ahmad Fallanie Ali
- (Malaysia) Mohd Fahmi Irfan Zailani
- (Malaysia) M. Iskandar Fitri Ahmad Sabti
- (Malaysia) Mohd Syazwan Alif Zaidy
- (Malaysia) Mohamad Asmui Ali Awang
- (Malaysia) Mohd Shahrazy Mohd Fuad

(Malaysia) Majlis Sukan Negara

- (Malaysia) Sofian Nabil Omar Mohd Bakri
- (Malaysia) Hamdann Hamidun
- (Malaysia) Wan Shazwan Afiq Wan Shahril Anwar
- (Malaysia) Mohammad Al-Ghazali Hamid
- (Malaysia) Muhamad Zawawi Azman
- (Malaysia) Muhammed Syafiq Syazwan Zainuddin

(Malaysia) ATM Cycling Team

- (Malaysia) Mohd Nor Rizuan Zainal
- (Malaysia) Mohd Fadzli Anuar Mohd Fauzi
- (Malaysia) Muhammad Elmi Jumari
- (Malaysia) Mohd Shahrul Afiza Fauizan
- (Malaysia) Muhammad Azman Shahudin
- (Malaysia) Mohd Shahrul Nizam Che Samsudin

(Malaysia) PDRM Cycling Team

- (Malaysia) Mohd Fauzan Ahmad Lutfi
- (Malaysia) Nik Mohd Azwan Zulkifle
- (Malaysia) Mohamad Faris Abdul Razak
- (Malaysia) Mohd Salahuddin Mat Saman
- (Malaysia) Azmirul Hafeez Aziz

(Malaysia) Team Corbusier

- (Malaysia) Syelvester Ding
- (Malaysia) Laurel Lauridsen Adrian
- (Malaysia) Mohamad Azrul Taufiq Annuar
- (Malaysia) Ahmad Firdaus Abdul Karim
- (Australia) Daniel Bonello
- (Australia) Paul Van Der Ploeg
