= Arnaud Molmy =

French cyclist

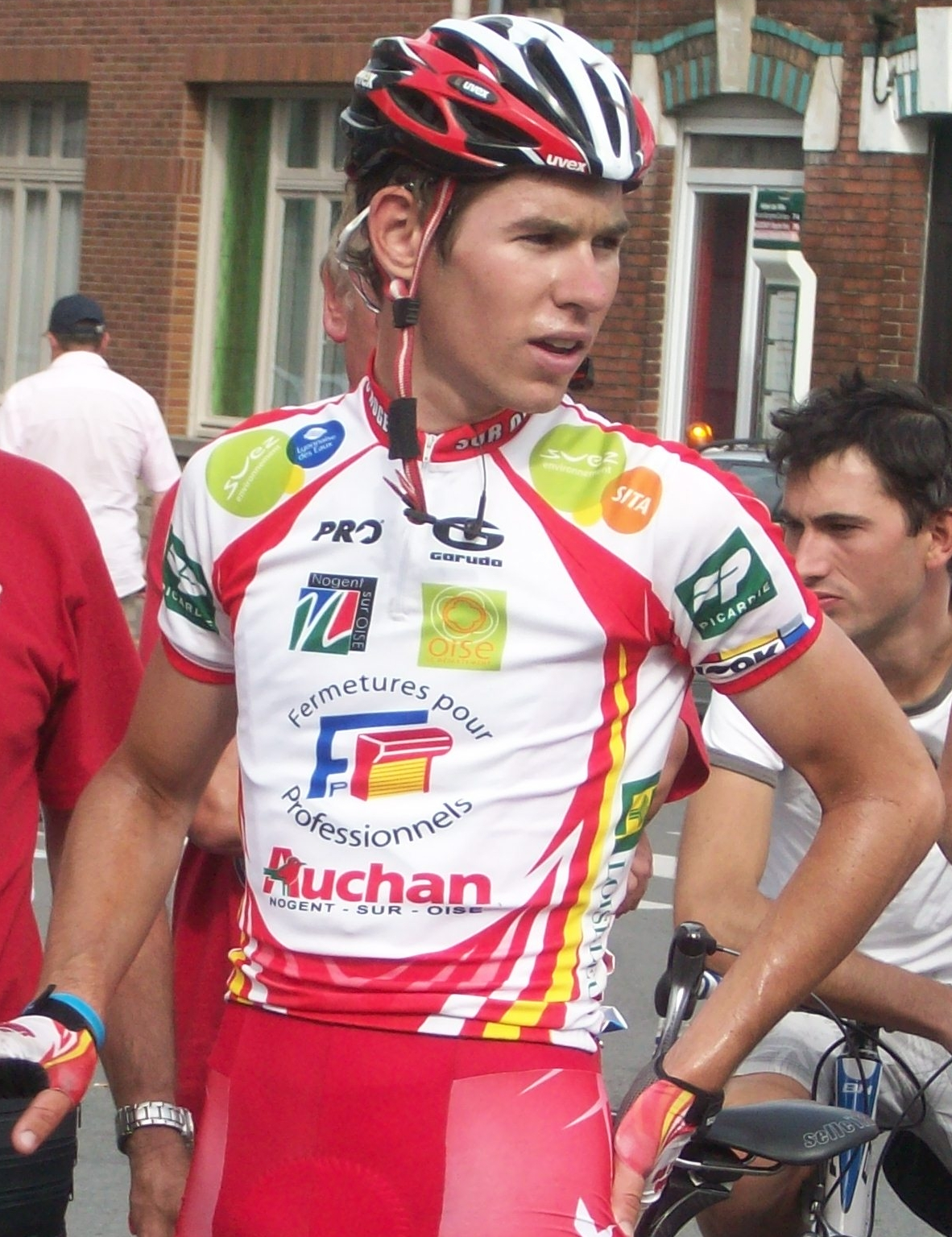
- Molmy in 2009

Personal information
- Full name: Arnaud Molmy
- Born: 7 August 1988 (age 38) Calais, France

Cycling career
- Sport: Cycling
- Current team: Retired
- Discipline: Road
- Role: Rider

Amateur teams
- 2004: AS Marck
- 2005–2008: Olympique Grande-Synthe
- 2009: CC Nogent-sur-Oise
- 2009: Cofidis (stagiaire)

Professional teams
- 2010: Roubaix–Lille Métropole
- 2011: BigMat–Auber 93
- 2012: Véranda Rideau–Super U

Arnaud Molmy (born 7 August 1988) is a French former professional cyclist.

== Major results ==
2009
1st La Roue Tourangelle
2010
1st Stage 4 Étoile de Bessèges
4th Road race, National Road Championships
