= La Roue Tourangelle =

French one-day road cycling race

Race details
- Date: Mid-March
- Region: Région Centre, France
- Local name: La Roue Tourangelle (in French)
- Discipline: Road race
- Competition: UCI Europe Tour
- Type: Single-day
- Web site: www.larouetourangelle.com

History
- First edition: 2002
- Editions: 24 (as of 2026)
- First winner: Mariusz Wiesiak (POL)
- Most wins: No repeat winners
- Most recent: Clément Venturini (FRA)

La Roue Tourangelle is a road bicycle race held annually in the Region Centre-Val de Loire, France. The editions 2002–2004 were reserved for amateurs; from 2005 until 2012, it was organized as a 1.2 event on the UCI Europe Tour; in 2013 it became a 1.1 event, and as of 2015 it became part of the French Road Cycling Cup.

== Winners ==
Year	Country	Rider	Team
2002	Poland	Mariusz Wiesiak	Polonia–Pacific
2003	Uzbekistan	Sergey Lagutin	Zoccorinese–Vellutex
2004	Poland	Błażej Janiaczyk	Norda Volvo Dorini
2005	France	Gilles Canouet	Agritubel–Loudun
2006	Russia	Sergey Kolesnikov	Omnibike Dynamo Moscow
2007	Russia	Yuri Trofimov	Moscow Stars
2008	Ukraine	Vitaliy Kondrut	ISD Sport Donetsk
2009	France	Arnaud Molmy	CC Nogent-sur-Oise
2010	France	Yann Guyot	Sojasun–AC Noyal
2011	Canada	David Veilleux	Team Europcar
2012	Russia	Vyacheslav Kuznetsov	Itera–Katusha
2013	France	Mickaël Delage	FDJ
2014	France	Angelo Tulik	Team Europcar
2015	France	Lorrenzo Manzin	FDJ
2016	France	Samuel Dumoulin	AG2R La Mondiale
2017	France	Flavien Dassonville	HP BTP–Auber93
2018	France	Marc Sarreau	Groupama–FDJ
2019	Belgium	Lionel Taminiaux	Wallonie Bruxelles
2020	No race due to the COVID-19 pandemic		
2021	France	Arnaud Démare	Groupama–FDJ
2022	France	Nacer Bouhanni	Arkéa–Samsic
2023	Ireland	Rory Townsend	Bolton Equities Black Spoke
2024	France	Jason Tesson	Team TotalEnergies
2025	Norway	Erlend Blikra	Uno-X Mobility
2026	France	Clément Venturini	Unibet Rose Rockets
