= Low Ji Wen =

Singaporean professional cyclist

Personal information
- Full name: Low Ji Wen
- Born: October 27, 1989 (age 36) Singapore
- Height: 1.70 m (5 ft 7 in)

Cycling career
- Sport: Cycling
- Current team: Retired
- Discipline: Road
- Role: Rider

Professional teams
- 2005–2007: Singapore National Cycling Team
- 2008–2009: LeTua Cycling Team
- 2010–2011: Geumsan Ginseng Asia
- 2012–2014: OCBC Singapore Continental Cycling Team
- 2015–2016: CCN Cycling Team

Low Ji Wen (simplified Chinese: 刘继文; traditional Chinese: 劉繼文; pinyin: Liú Jìwén, born October 27, 1989) is a Singaporean former professional road racing cyclist.

== Career ==
=== Early life and career ===
Low was born at Thomson Medical Centre in Singapore to Lee Tang Yin, a general practitioner, and Low Wye Mun, a Sports Medicine physician. His siblings are Ji Zhen, a veterinarian and Ji Yin, an early childhood educator. Low's name, which means "to follow in his father's footsteps", was given to him by his grandfather, Lee Ting Hui, an author and poet.

Low attended Anglo-Chinese School (Junior), Anglo-Chinese School (Barker Road) and Anglo-Chinese Junior College. He began cycling professionally in July 2004 and after completing one year of junior college studies, he left the school to focus on his career in cycling. He was previously a member of LeTua Cycling Team and Team Guemsan Ginseng Asia.

Low was crowned 2005 Singapore Men's Junior National Champion in the Under-19 category. He has also competed in the 2005 Southeast Asian Games, the 2007 Union Cycliste Internationale Juniors World Road and Track Championships and the Tour of Egat in Thailand, where he posted the best time for the LeTua Cycling Team, and ultimately won the team an overall position of fifth place.

In 2009, at the age of 19 years, Low won the Singapore National Road Cycling Championships, beating local riders as well as international cyclists.

=== Professional racing ===
During his professional career, he raced in the UCI Asian Pro Circuit races including the Tour de Langkawi, the Tour of Japan, the Tour de Kumano, and the Tour de Korea. He led an exciting breakaway in Stage 8 of the 2013 Tour de Langkawi that was only chased down in the last 6 kilometres (3.7 miles). He finished sixth at the 2010 Tour de Jakarta, fourth at the 2014 Critérium International de Blida and seventh in the road race at the 2015 Southeast Asian Games.

== Personal life ==
Ji Wen previously owns Red Kite Cycling, providing cycling instruction, cycling training and performance bicycles. His company is based in Singapore. He is currently a brand manager for Decathlon Singapore, he is based in the Bedok outlet.
