= List of Malaysian records in archery =

There are two different kinds of archery records in Malaysia and certified by the National Archery Association of Malaysia (NAAM):

- National record, more commonly referred to in Malaysia as the rekod kebangsaan: the best score recorded anywhere in the world by an archer or team holding Malaysian citizenship.
- Malaysian All-Comers record: the best score recorded within Malaysia by an archer or team regardless of nationality.

Key to tables:

Legend: # – Record awaiting ratification by National Archery Association of Malaysia; WR – World record; AS – Asian record; CR – Commonwealth record

== Current Malaysian national records ==
=== Men ===
Event	Record	Athlete	Date	Meet	Place	Ref
Recurve
90 m (36 arrows)	323	Khairul Anuar Mohamad	2013	World Cup Stage 1	Shanghai, China	
70 m (36 arrows)	348	Khairul Anuar Mohamad	2012	National Circuit	Lumut, Malaysia	
50 m (36 arrows)	342	Cheng Chu Sian	2006	Asian Grand Prix	Bangkok, Thailand	
30 m (36 arrows)	359	Cheng Chu Sian	2011	World Championships	Turin, Italy	
Overall (144 arrows)	1346	Khairul Anuar Mohamad	2013	World Cup Stage 1	Shanghai, China	
Individual elimination (18 arrows)	167	Cheng Chu Sian	2004	Sukma Games	Negeri Sembilan, Malaysia	
Individual elimination (12 arrows)	117	Cheng Chu Sian	2008	ASEAN University Games	Kuala Lumpur, Malaysia	
Team elimination (27 arrows)	244	Muhammad Marbawi Sulaiman; Cheng Chu Sian; Amirnullah Ahmad; Syahmi Mohd Fahuzi	2003	Southeast Asian Games	Hanoi, Vietnam	
Team elimination (24 arrows)	228	Haziq Kamaruddin; Khairul Anuar Mohamad; Fazli Hisham Fauzi	2011	Asian Grand Prix	Laos	
Double 70 m	678	Khairul Anuar Mohamad	2012	World Cup	Antalya, Turkey	

Event	Record	Athlete	Date	Meet	Place	Ref
Compound
90 m (36 arrows)	342	Mohd Zaki Mahazan	2012	National Circuit	Kuala Lumpur, Malaysia	
70 m (36 arrows)	351	Lang Hong Keong	2009	Asian Grand Prix	Bangkok, Thailand	
50 m (36 arrows)	354	Wong Co Wan	2016	Muafakat Johor International Tournament	Johor, Malaysia	
50 m (36 arrows)	354	Mohd Juwaidi Mazuki	2015	UPM Open	Kuala Lumpur, Malaysia	
30 m (36 arrows)	359	Khambeswaran Mohanaraja	25 July 2016	Sukma Games	Sarawak, Malaysia	
Overall (144 arrows)	1393	Lang Hong Keong	2009	National Circuit	Kedah, Malaysia	
Individual elimination (15 arrows)	149	Mohd Juwaidi Mazuki	2016	World Cup Stage 2	Shanghai, China	
Individual elimination (12 arrows)	120	Lang Hong Keong	2009	Asian Grand Prix	Kuala Lumpur, Malaysia	
Individual elimination (12 arrows)	120	Michael Soo	2016	National Circuit	China	
Team elimination (24 arrows)	234	Zulfadhli Ruslan; Mohd Juwaidi Mazuki; Ahmad Syafiq Azim	2016	ASEAN University Games	Singapore	
Double 70 m	699	Lang Hong Keong	2009	Asian Grand Prix	Bangkok, Thailand	
Double 50 m	704	Mohd Juwaidi Mazuki	2015	UPM Open	Kuala Lumpur, Malaysia	

=== Women ===
Event	Record	Athlete	Date	Meet	Place	Ref
Recurve
70 m (36 arrows)	331	Nur Aqilah Yusof	24 July 2016	Sukma Games	Sarawak, Malaysia	
60 m (36 arrows)	335	Fairus Hanisah Che Ibrahim		Asian Championships	Hong Kong	
50 m (36 arrows)	335	Nur Aliya Ghapar	2014	National Junior Championships	Kedah, Malaysia	
30 m (36 arrows)	350	Farah Amalina Azhar	25 July 2016	Sukma Games	Sarawak, Malaysia	
Overall (144 arrows)	1329	Nur Aliya Ghapar	2014	National Junior Championships	Kedah, Malaysia	
Individual elimination (18 arrows)	167	Shamani Ganesan		Asian Grand Prix	Bangkok, Thailand	
Individual elimination (12 arrows)	114	Mon Redee Sut Txi	2004	Asian Championships	Myanmar	
Team elimination (27 arrows)	243	Mon Redee Sut Txi; Anbarasi Subramaniam; Fairuz Hanisah Che Ibrahim; Shamani Ganesan	2004	Asian Championships	Myanmar	
Team elimination (24 arrows)	215	Anbarasi Subramaniam; Nor Aziera Taip	2006	Asian Grand Prix	Kuala Lumpur, Malaysia	
Double 70 m	649	Shamani Ganesan	2004	Southeast Asian Championships	Myanmar	

Event	Record	Athlete	Date	Meet	Place	Ref
Compound
70 m (36 arrows)	347	Fatin Nurfatehah Mat Salleh	2009	Southeast Asian Games	Vientiane, Laos	
60 m (36 arrows)	355	Fatin Nurfatehah Mat Salleh	2010	National Grand Prix	Sarawak, Malaysia	
50 m (36 arrows)	351	Fatin Nurfatehah Mat Salleh	2012	Asian Grand Prix	Bangkok, Thailand	
30 m (36 arrows)	360	Fatin Nurfatehah Mat Salleh	2013	MASUM	Kuala Lumpur, Malaysia	
Overall (144 arrows)	1391	Fatin Nurfatehah Mat Salleh	2010	National Circuit	Sarawak, Malaysia	
Individual elimination (15 arrows)	144	Norizah Ishak	2010	Asian Grand Prix	Kuala Lumpur, Malaysia	
Team elimination (24 arrows)	232	Norizah Ishak; Fatin Nurfatehah Mat Salleh; Norhayati Al-Madinah Hashim	2010	Asian Grand Prix	Kuala Lumpur, Malaysia	
Double 50 m	695	Fatin Nurfatehah Mat Salleh	2012	Asian Grand Prix	Bangkok, Thailand	

== Current Malaysian All-Comers records ==
=== Men ===
Event	Record	Athlete	Date	Meet	Place	Ref
Recurve
90 m (36 arrows)						
70 m (36 arrows)						
50 m (36 arrows)						
30 m (36 arrows)						
Overall (144 arrows)						
Individual elimination (18 arrows)						
Individual elimination (12 arrows)						
Team elimination (27 arrows)						
Team elimination (24 arrows)						
Double 70 m						

Event	Record	Athlete	Date	Meet	Place	Ref
Compound
90 m (36 arrows)						
70 m (36 arrows)						
50 m (36 arrows)						
30 m (36 arrows)						
Overall (144 arrows)						
Individual elimination (15 arrows)						
Individual elimination (12 arrows)						
Team elimination (24 arrows)						
Double 70 m						
Double 50 m						

=== Women ===
Event	Record	Athlete	Date	Meet	Place	Ref
Recurve
70 m (36 arrows)						
60 m (36 arrows)						
50 m (36 arrows)						
30 m (36 arrows)						
Overall (144 arrows)						
Individual elimination (18 arrows)						
Individual elimination (12 arrows)						
Team elimination (27 arrows)						
Team elimination (24 arrows)						
Double 70 m						

Event	Record	Athlete	Date	Meet	Place	Ref
Compound
70 m (36 arrows)						
60 m (36 arrows)						
50 m (36 arrows)						
30 m (36 arrows)						
Overall (144 arrows)						
Individual elimination (15 arrows)						
Team elimination (24 arrows)						
Double 50 m						

== See also ==
- List of Sukma records in archery
