= Stefano Borchi =

Italian cyclist

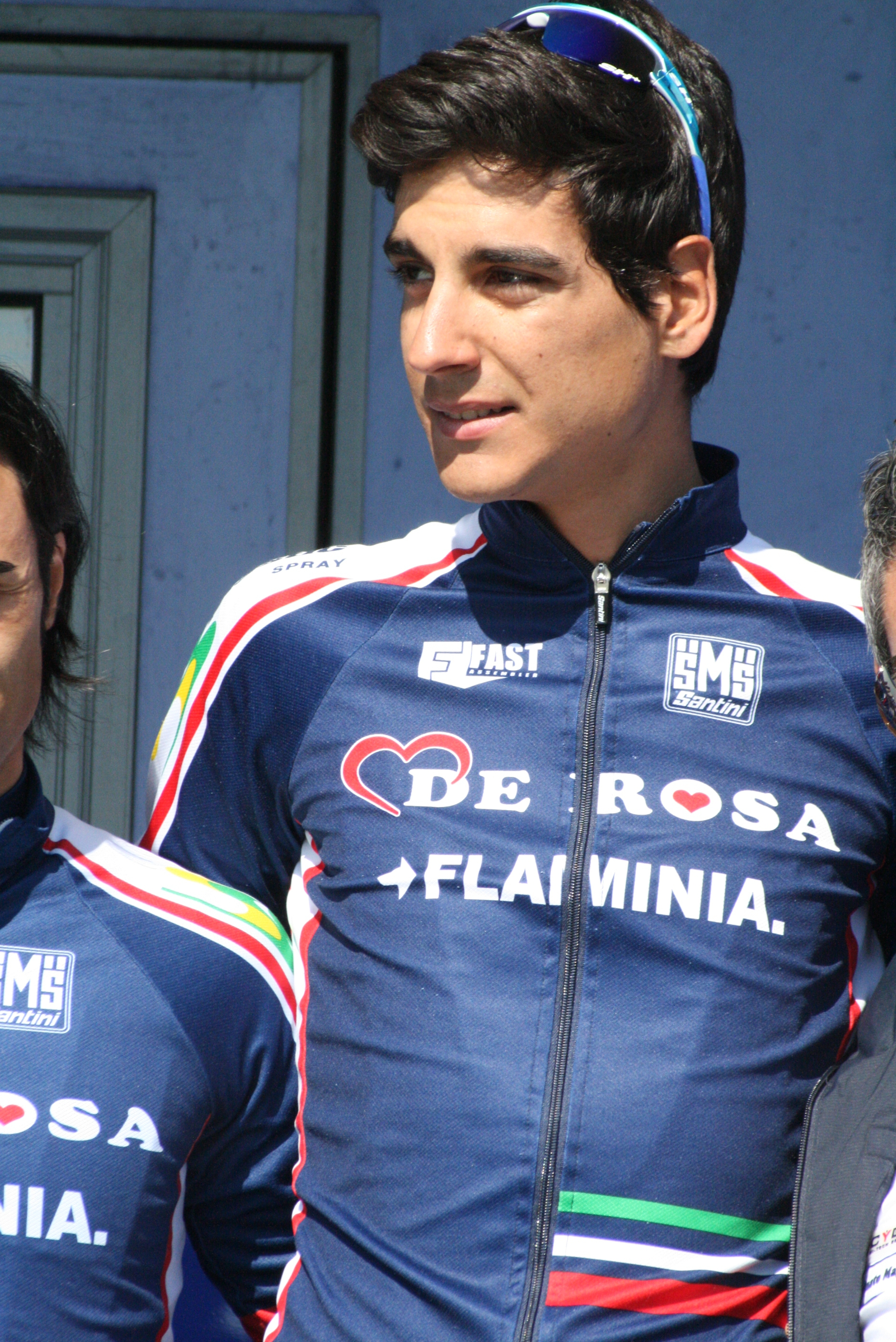
- Borchi in 2011

Personal information
- Born: 9 March 1987 (age 39) Prato, Italy

Cycling career
- Sport: Cycling
- Discipline: Road
- Role: Rider

Professional teams
- 2010–2011: De Rosa–Stac Plastic
- 2012–2013: Farnese Vini–Selle Italia

Stefano Borchi (born 9 March 1987) is an Italian racing cyclist. He rode at the 2013 UCI Road World Championships.

== Major results ==
2008
5th Time trial, UCI Road World Under–23 Championships
2009
5th Memorial Davide Fardelli
2013
1st Stage 8 Vuelta a Venezuela
