= Mariusz Wiesiak =

Polish bicycle racer

Personal information
- Full name: Mariusz Wiesiak
- Born: 1 April 1981 (age 45)

Cycling career
- Sport: Cycling
- Current team: Retired
- Discipline: Road
- Role: Rider

Amateur teams
- 2002: Daver Piaggio
- 2003: Pacific–Da-Ver

Professional teams
- 2004–2005: Team Nippo
- 2007: Nippo Corporation–Meitan Hompo–Asada
- 2008: Nippo–Endeka
- 2010: Team Nippo
- 2011–2013: Matrix Powertag

Mariusz Wiesiak (born 1 April 1981) is a Polish former professional cyclist.

== Major results ==
2002
1st La Roue Tourangelle
3rd Giro del Mendrisiotto
3rd Gran Premio della Liberazione
2003
1st Giro del Mendrisiotto
3rd Trofeo Internazionale Bastianelli
3rd Road race, National Under-23 Road Championships
5th Trofeo Banca Popolare di Vicenza
2004
1st Stage 4 Paths of King Nikola
1st Stage 3 Szlakiem Grodów Piastowskich
1st Stage 1 Tour of Japan
2005
1st Memoriał Romana Siemińskiego
Tour du Cameroun

1st Stages 7 & 10

1st Stage 2 Tour de Hokkaido
2006
1st Archer Grand Prix
Tour de Hokkaido

1st Stages 4 & 5

2nd Overall Tour du Loir-et-Cher
2007
6th La Roue Tourangelle
2008
7th Gran Premio Bruno Beghelli
2009
1st Prologue Tour de Kumano
4th Overall Tour de Hokkaido
2011
5th Overall Tour de Okinawa
7th Overall Tour de Hokkaido
2012
1st Stage 1 Tour of Malopolska
5th Tour de Okinawa
5th Memoriał Andrzeja Trochanowskiego
