= Fabian Schnaidt =

German former road bicycle racer (born 1990)

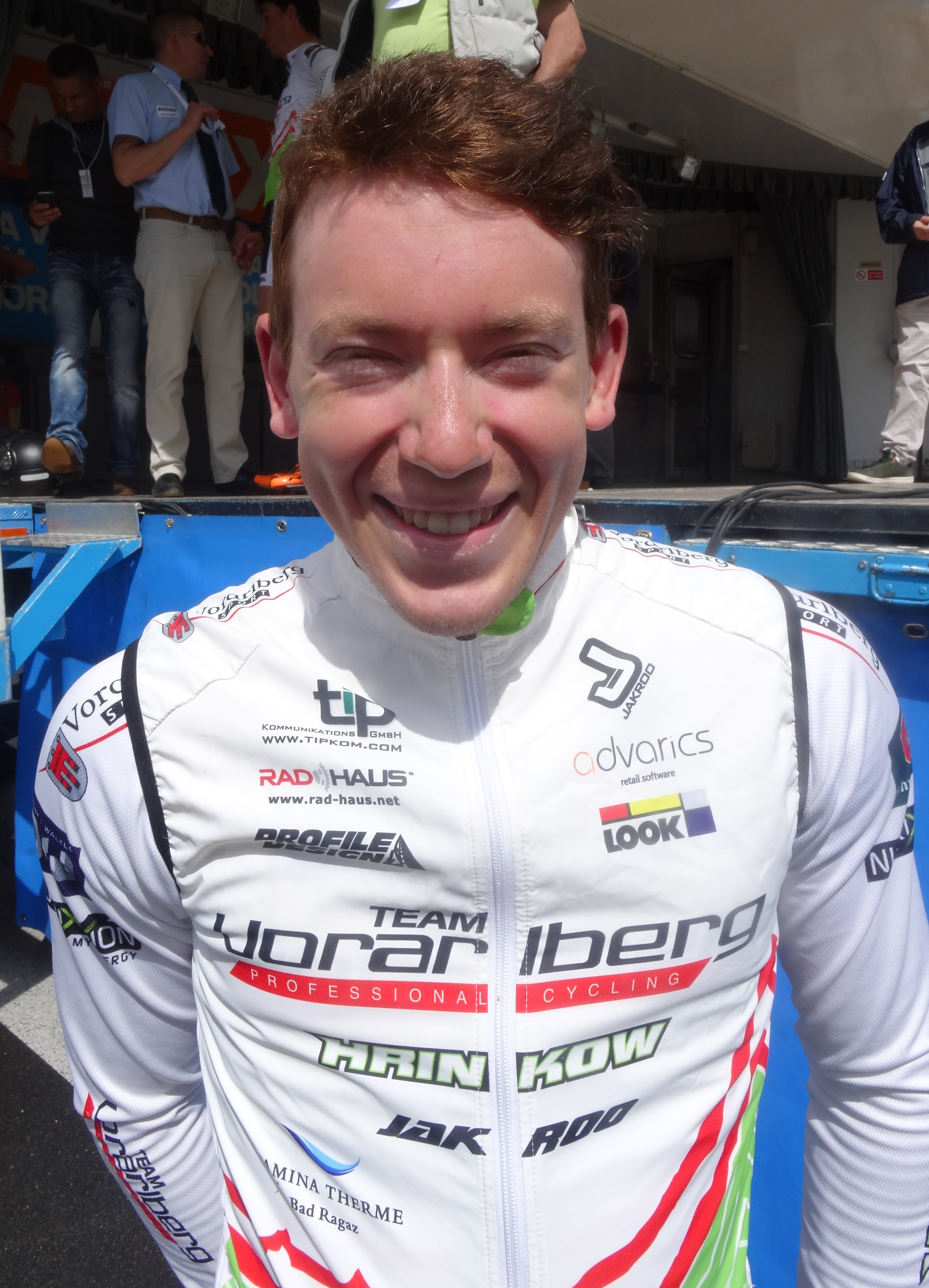
- Schnaidt at the 2014 Paris-Arras Tour.

Personal information
- Born: 27 October 1990 (age 35) Germany

Cycling career
- Sport: Cycling
- Current team: Retired
- Discipline: Road
- Role: Rider

Amateur teams
- 2010: Team Bergstrasse
- 2012: Team Specialized Concept Store

Professional teams
- 2013: Champion System
- 2014: Team Vorarlberg

Fabian Schnaidt (born 27 October 1990) is a German former road bicycle racer, who rode competitively between 2010 and 2014 for Team Bergstrasse, Team Specialized Concept Store, Champion System, and Team Vorarlberg.

== Major results ==
2006
2nd National Novice Team Pursuit Championships
2010
2nd LBS Cup Reute
2nd Grosser Silber-Pils Preiss
3rd Baden-Württembergische Strassenmeisterschaften
2011
1st National Under-23 Road Race Championships
1st Cottbus–Görlitz–Cottbus
4th Antwerpse Havenpijl
8th Eschborn-Frankfurt City Loop U23
2012
1st Stage 6 La Tropicale Amissa Bongo
1st Stage 2 Oberösterreichrundfahrt
1st Stage 1 Tour of Qinghai Lake
8th ProRace Berlin
2014
Tour of Iran

1st Stages 1 & 6

1st Stage 5 Tour de Taiwan
1st Stage 2 Paris–Arras Tour
2nd Banja Luka–Belgrad I
3rd GP Izola
8th Rutland–Melton International CiCLE Classic
