= Rico Rogers =

New Zealand bicycle racer

Personal information
- Full name: Rico Dene Thomas Rogers
- Born: 15 April 1978 (age 48) Palmerston North, New Zealand

Cycling career
- Sport: Cycling
- Current team: retired
- Discipline: Road
- Role: Rider
- Rider type: Sprinter

Professional teams
- 2010–2011: Giant Asia Racing Team
- 2012: Node 4-Giordana Racing
- 2013: Synergy Baku Cycling Project
- 2014: OCBC Singapore Continental
- 2015: African Wildlife Safaris
- 2016: Attaque Team Gusto

Rico Dene Thomas Rogers (born 25 April 1978, in Palmerston North) is a retired New Zealand cyclist who last rode for Attaque Team Gusto.

== Palmares ==
2010
1st Stages 4 & 6 Tour of China
2011
1st Stage 7 Tour de Taiwan
1st Stage 8 Tour of Qinghai Lake
1st Stage 1 Tour of China
2012
1st Grand Prix de la ville de Pérenchies
2013
1st Stage 1 Tour of Thailand
1st Stage 6 An Post Rás
1st Stage 6 Tour of China I
3rd Jurmala Grand Prix
4th Riga Grand Prix
