= OCBC Singapore Continental Cycling Team =

Team information
- UCI code: TSI
- Registered: Singapore
- Founded: 2012
- Disbanded: 2014
- Discipline: Road
- Status: UCI Continental Team

Key personnel
- Team manager: Justin Cheong Weiwen

Team name history
- 2012–2014: OCBC Singapore Continental Cycling Team (TSI)

OCBC Singapore Continental Cycling Team (UCI team code: TSI) was a Singaporean UCI Continental cycling team managed by Justin Cheong Weiwen and sponsored by Oversea-Chinese Banking Corporation (OCBC).

== Major wins ==
2013
Stage 3 New Zealand Cycle Classic, Jason Christie
Stage 2 Tour of Thailand, Loh Sea Keong
Stage 4 Tour de Singkarak, Loh Sea Keong
Overall Jelajah Malaysia, Loh Sea Keong
SIN National Road Champion, Low Ji Wen
SIN National TT Champion HO Junrong
Stage 1 Tour de Ijen, Jason Christie
2014
Critérium international d'Alger, Thomas Rabou
Stage 2 Tour International de Blida, Thomas Rabou
Stage 1 Tour International de Sétif, Ronald Yeung
Stage 1 Le Tour de Filipinas, Eric Sheppard

== 2014 Team roster ==
As of 31 December 2014.

Rider	Date of birth
Ang Kee Meng (SIN)	17 October 1986 (aged 28)
Ahmad Haidar Anuawar (MAS)	25 April 1986 (aged 28)
Cameron Bayly (AUS)	11 October 1990 (aged 24)
Ryan Chan Zhi-Ming (SIN)	9 August 1994 (aged 20)
Goh Choon-Huat (SIN)	14 December 1990 (aged 24)
Ho Jun-Rong (SIN)	28 August 1990 (aged 24)
Jang Chan Jae (KOR)	6 January 1989 (aged 25)
Benedict Lee Shern-Mun (SIN)	3 January 1995 (aged 19)

Rider	Date of birth
Lemuel Lee Yun-Jie (SIN)	8 July 1991 (aged 23)
Low Ji Wen (SIN)	27 October 1989 (aged 25)
Mitchell Mulhern (AUS)	22 January 1991 (aged 23)
Thomas Rabou (NED)	12 December 1983 (aged 31)
Rico Rogers (NZL)	25 April 1978 (aged 36)
Eric Sheppard (AUS)	16 October 1991 (aged 23)
Calvin Sim Teck-Kwang (SIN)	14 October 1989 (aged 25)
Ronald Yeung (HKG)	30 July 1988 (aged 26)
