= Loh Sea Keong =

Malaysian cyclist

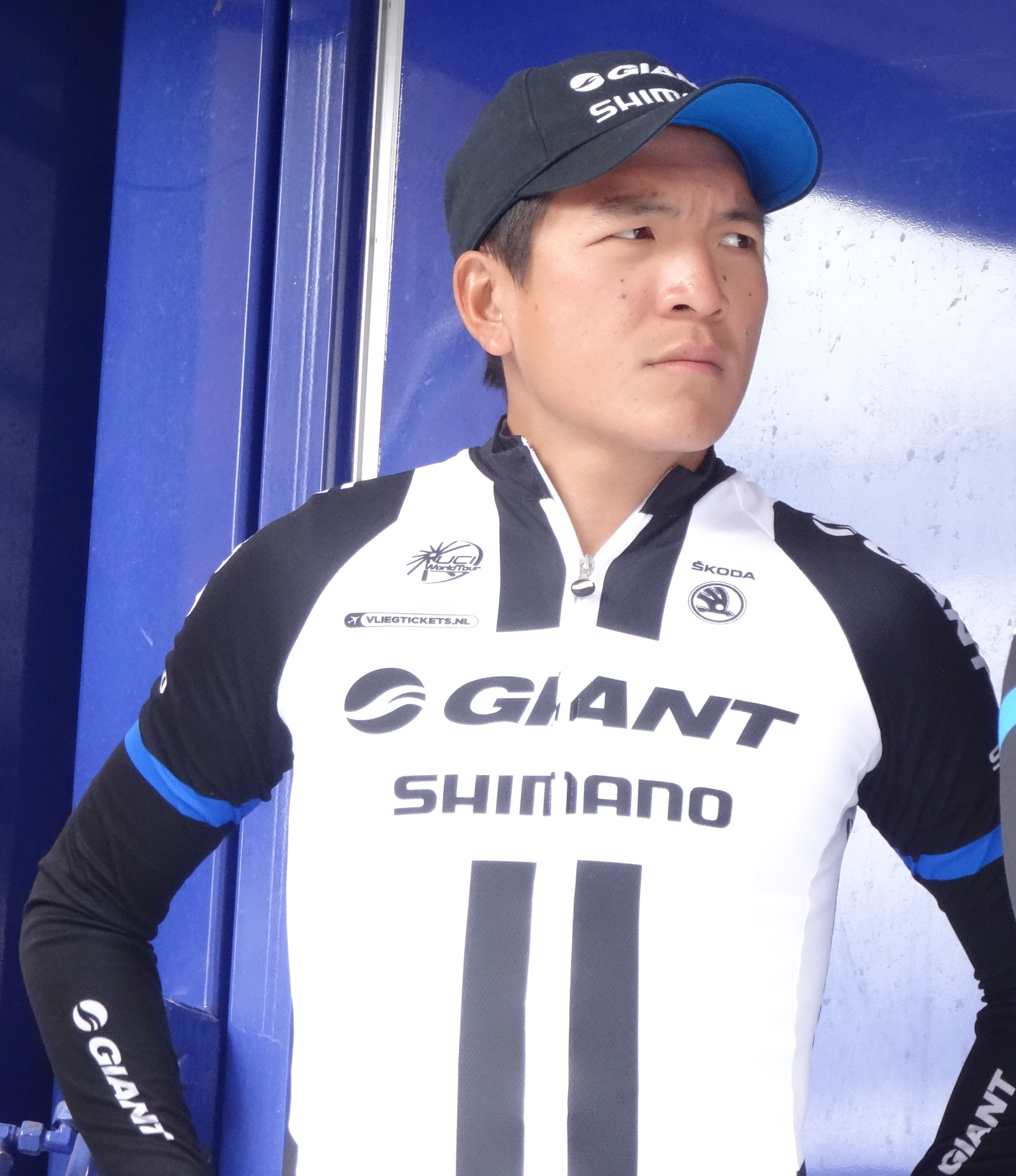
- Loh in 2014

Personal information
- Full name: Loh Sea Keong
- Born: 11 February 1986 (age 40) Kuala Krai, Malaysia
- Height: 1.76 m (5 ft 9 in)
- Weight: 68 kg (150 lb)

Cycling career
- Sport: Cycling
- Current team: Retired
- Discipline: Road
- Role: Rider

Professional teams
- 2006–2011: Marco Polo
- 2012–2013: OCBC Singapore Continental Cycling Team
- 2014: Giant–Shimano
- 2015: SEG Racing
- 2017–2021: Thailand Continental Cycling Team
- 2023: Roojai Online Insurance

Major wins
- Jelajah Malaysia (2013)

Loh Sea Keong (simplified Chinese: 罗熙强; traditional Chinese: 羅熙強; pinyin: Luó Xīqiáng; Jyutping: Lo4 Hei1 Koeng4; Pe̍h-ōe-jī: Lô Hi-kiông; born 11 February 1986) is a Malaysian former professional cyclist, who competed as a professional from 2006 to 2023. In the 2013 Jelajah Malaysia race, Loh made history by becoming the first Malaysian rider to win the competition, a Union Cycliste Internationale (UCI) race.

== Career ==
=== Marco Polo Cycling Team ===
In 2005, Loh left Malaysia at the age of 19 to become a full-time professional cyclist. He joined the Chinese team, Marco Polo, based in Europe. He rode for the team until the end of 2011.

=== OCBC Singapore Continental Cycling Team ===
After failing to sign a contract with any foreign team, Loh returned to Malaysia consider his options. Loh then accepted an offer from the first Singaporean UCI Continental team, OCBC Singapore Continental Cycling Team to ride for them.

=== Argos–Shimano ===
At the Shimano Highway Challenge in Malaysia on 24 November 2013, it was announced that he would be the first South East Asian to join a ProTour Team with Giant–Shimano.

== Major results ==
2008
1st Stage 3 Tour of Thailand
2012
2nd Overall Tour de Filipinas
8th Overall Tour of Thailand
2013
1st Overall Jelajah Malaysia
1st Stage 2 Tour of Thailand
1st Stage 4 Tour de Singkarak
2nd Melaka Governor's Cup
4th Road race, Southeast Asian Games
9th Tour de Okinawa
2014
10th Road race, Asian Road Championships
2015
5th Overall Tour of Thailand
