= 2012 Tour de Borneo =

2011–12 UCI Asia Tour

Race details
- Dates: 27 April–1 May 2012
- Stages: 5
- Distance: 755.8 km (469.6 mi)
- Winning time: 19h 32' 04"

Results
	Winner	Michael Torckler (NZL)	(New Zealand)
	Second	Nathan Earle (AUS)	(Genesys Wealth Advisers)
	Third	Jonathan Lovelock (AUS)	(Genesys Wealth Advisers)

The 2012 Tour de Borneo, a cycling stage race that took place in Malaysia. It was held from 27 April to 1 May 2012. There were five stages, covering 755.8 kilometres. In fact, the race was sanctioned by the Union Cycliste Internationale as a 2.2 category race and was part of the 2011–12 UCI Asia Tour calendar.

Michael Torckler of New Zealand won the race, followed by Nathan Earle of Australia second and Jonathan Lovelock of Australia third overall. Out of 102 riders, a total 72 riders made it to the finish in Kota Kinabalu.

== Stages ==
Stage	Date	Course	Distance	Stage result		
Stage	Date	Course	Distance	Winner	Second	Third
1	27 April	Semporna to Tawau	102.8 km (63.9 mi)	Michael Torckler (NZL)	Louis Crosby (NZL)	Roman van Uden (NZL)
2	28 April	Tawau to Lahad Datu	146 km (90.7 mi)	Nathan Earle (AUS)	Mohamed Shahrul Afiza Fauzan (MAS)	Michael Torckler (NZL)
3	29 April	Lahad Datu to Sandakan	181 km (112.5 mi)	Anthony Giacoppo (AUS)	Mohamed Harrif Salleh (MAS)	Azamat Turaev (UZB)
4	30 April	Sepilok to Kundasang	214 km (133.0 mi)	Nathan Earle (AUS)	Michael Torckler (NZL)	Bambang Suryadi (INA)
5	1 May	Kundasang to Kota Kinabalu	112 km (69.6 mi)	Volodymyr Zagorodniy (UKR)	Luke Joyce (AUS)	Black Hose (AUS)

== Final standings ==
=== General classification ===
	Rider	Team	Time
1	(New Zealand) Michael Torckler	New Zealand	19h 32' 04"
2	(Australia) Nathan Earle	Genesys Wealth Advisers	+ 06"
3	(Australia) Jonathan Lovelock	Genesys Wealth Advisers	+ 44"
4	(Australia) Caleb Jones	Australia	+ 53"
5	(Australia) Blake Hose	Genesys Wealth Advisers	+ 01' 00"
6	(Kazakhstan) Sergey Kuzmin	Kazakhstan	+ 01' 13"
7	(Indonesia) Tonton Susanto	Indonesia	s.t.
8	(Malaysia) Mohamed Shahrul Mat Amin	Terengganu Cycling Team	+ 01' 16"
9	(Indonesia) Bambang Suryadi	Indonesia	+ 02' 48"
10	(Germany) Timo Scholz	CCN Cycling Team	+ 02' 51"

== Stage results ==
=== Stage 1 ===
27 April 2012 — Semporna to Tawau, 102.8 km (63.9 mi)

	Rider	Team	Time
1	(New Zealand) Michael Torckler	New Zealand	02h 23' 06"
2	(New Zealand) Louis Crosby	New Zealand	s.t.
3	(New Zealand) Roman van Uden	New Zealand	s.t.
4	(Malaysia) Mohamed Harrif Salleh	Terengganu Cycling Team	s.t.
5	(Uzbekistan) Azamat Turaev	Uzbekistan Suren Team	s.t.
6	(Australia) Anthony Giacoppo	Genesys Wealth Advisers	s.t.
7	(Brunei) Muhammad Raihaan Abd Aziz	CCN Cycling Team	s.t.
8	(Ukraine) Volodymyr Zagorodniy	Uzbekistan Suren Team	s.t.
9	(New Zealand) James Williamson	New Zealand	s.t.
10	(Philippines) Ericson Obosa	Philippines	s.t.

=== Stage 2 ===
28 April 2012 — Tawau to Lahad Datu, 146 km (90.7 mi)

	Rider	Team	Time
1	(Australia) Nathan Earle	Genesys Wealth Advisers	03h 38' 44"
2	(Malaysia) Mohamed Shahrul Afiza Fauzan	Malaysia	s.t.
3	(New Zealand) Michael Torckler	New Zealand	s.t.
4	(Ukraine) Volodymyr Zagorodniy	Uzbekistan Suren Team	s.t.
5	(Australia) Anthony Giacoppo	Genesys Wealth Advisers	s.t.
6	(Australia) Caleb Jones	Australia	s.t.
7	(Netherlands) Lex Nederlof	CCN Cycling Team	s.t.
8	(Indonesia) Arin Iswanna	Indonesia	s.t.
9	(Germany) Timo Scholz	CCN Cycling Team	s.t.
10	(Uzbekistan) Azamat Turaev	Uzbekistan Suren Team	s.t.

=== Stage 3 ===
29 April 2012 — Lahad Datu to Sandakan, 181 km (112.5 mi)

	Rider	Team	Time
1	(Australia) Anthony Giacoppo	Genesys Wealth Advisers	04h 35' 49"
2	(Malaysia) Mohamed Harrif Salleh	Terengganu Cycling Team	s.t.
3	(Uzbekistan) Azamat Turaev	Uzbekistan Suren Team	s.t.
4	(Malaysia) Mohamed Shahrul Mat Amin	Terengganu Cycling Team	s.t.
5	(New Zealand) Roman van Uden	New Zealand	s.t.
6	(Malaysia) Ahmad Haidar Anuawar	OCBC Singapore Continental Cycling Team	s.t.
7	(Indonesia) Bambang Suryadi	Indonesia	s.t.
8	(Australia) Caleb Jones	Australia	s.t.
9	(Netherlands) Lex Nederlof	CCN Cycling Team	s.t.
10	(Germany) Timo Scholz	CCN Cycling Team	s.t.

=== Stage 4 ===
30 April 2012 — Sepilok to Kundasang, 214 km (133.0 mi)

	Rider	Team	Time
1	(Australia) Nathan Earle	Genesys Wealth Advisers	06h 11' 48"
2	(New Zealand) Michael Torckler	New Zealand	s.t.
3	(Indonesia) Bambang Suryadi	Indonesia	+ 18"
4	(Malaysia) Mohamed Shahrul Mat Amin	Terengganu Cycling Team	+ 27"
5	(Australia) Caleb Jones	Australia	s.t.
6	(Philippines) Mark Guevarra	Philippines	+ 34"
7	(Kazakhstan) Sergey Kuzmin	Kazakhstan	+ 47"
8	(Indonesia) Tonton Susanto	Indonesia	s.t.
9	(Germany) Timo Scholz	CCN Cycling Team	+ 01' 21"
10	(Australia) Jonathan Lovelock	Genesys Wealth Advisers	+ 01' 53"

=== Stage 5 ===
1 May 2012 — Kundasang to Kota Kinabalu, 112 km (69.6 mi)

	Rider	Team	Time
1	(Ukraine) Volodymyr Zagorodniy	Uzbekistan Suren Team	02h 40' 30"
2	(Australia) Luke Joyce	Australia	s.t.
3	(Australia) Blake Hose	Genesys Wealth Advisers	s.t.
4	(Indonesia) Dadi Suryadi	Indonesia	+ 13"
5	(Australia) Trent Morley	Australia	s.t.
6	(Kazakhstan) Ivan Chernyavskiy	Kazakhstan	s.t.
7	(Indonesia) Bambang Suryadi	Indonesia	s.t.
8	(Ukraine) Valery Kobzarenko	Uzbekistan Suren Team	s.t.
9	(Malaysia) Ahmad Fahmi Farhan Ahmad Fuat	Malaysia	s.t.
10	(Australia) Jonathan Lovelock	Genesys Wealth Advisers	s.t.
