= 2012 Jelajah Malaysia =

2011–12 UCI Asia Tour

Race details
- Dates: 8–13 May 2012
- Stages: 6
- Distance: 1,042.1 km (647.5 mi)
- Winning time: 25h 04' 20"

Results
Jersey awarded to the overall winner	Winner	Yusuf Abrekov (UZB)	(Uzbekistan Suren Team)
	Second	Jai Crawford (AUS)	(RTS Racing Team)
	Third	Yasuharu Nakajima (JPN)	(Aisan Racing Team)
Jersey awarded to the points classification winner	Points	Adiq Husainie Othman (MAS)	(Malaysia Development Team)
Jersey awarded to the mountains classification winner	Mountains	Dadi Suryadi (INA)	(Putra Perjuangan)
	Team	Putra Perjuangan	

The 2012 Jelajah Malaysia, a cycling stage race that took place in Malaysia. It was held from 8 to 13 May, 2012. There were six stages with a total of 1,042.1 kilometres. In fact, the race was sanctioned by the Union Cycliste Internationale as a 2.2-category race and was part of the 2011–12 UCI Asia Tour calendar.

Yusuf Abrekov of Uzbekistan won the race, followed by Jai Crawford of Australia in second and Yasuharu Nakajima of Japan in third overall. Adiq Husainie Othman of Malaysia won the points classification, and Dadi Suryadi of Indonesia won the mountains classification. Putra Perjuangan won the team classification.

== Stages ==
Stage	Date	Course	Distance	Stage result		
Stage	Date	Course	Distance	Winner	Second	Third
1	8 May	Merdeka Stadium, Kuala Lumpur to Bandar Baru Kampar	161.5 km (100.4 mi)	Shinichi Fukushima (JPN)	Michael Torckler (NZL)	Hari Fitrianto (INA)
2	9 May	Bandar Baru Kampar to Kulim	201.8 km (125.4 mi)	Jai Crawford (AUS)	Yasuharu Nakajima (JPN)	Tonton Susanto (INA)
3	10 May	Kulim to FELDA Chuping	168.8 km (104.9 mi)	Mohd Shahrul Mat Amin (MAS)	Dani Lesmana (INA)	Adiq Husainie Othman (MAS)
4	11 May	Kangar to Sungai Petani	98 km (60.9 mi)	Mohamed Harrif Salleh (MAS)	Shinpei Fukuda (JPN)	Joel Pearson (AUS)
5	12 May	Sungai Petani to Ipoh	193 km (119.9 mi)	Mohamed Harrif Salleh (MAS)	Mohd Nur Rizuan Zainal (MAS)	Alex Carver (AUS)
6	13 May	Ipoh to Merdeka Square, Kuala Lumpur	199.5 km (124.0 mi)	Shinichi Fukushima (JPN)	Mohamed Harrif Salleh (MAS)	Mohamed Zamri Salleh (MAS)

== Classification leadership ==
Stage	Stage winner	General classification	Points classification	Mountains classification	Asian rider classification	Team classification	Asian team classification
1	Shinichi Fukushima	Shinichi Fukushima	Adiq Husainie Othman	Mohd Saufi Mat Senan	Shinichi Fukushima	Uzbekistan Suren Team	Putra Perjuangan
2	Jai Crawford	Yusuf Abrekov	Adiq Husainie Othman	Dadi Suryadi	Yusuf Abrekov	Putra Perjuangan	Putra Perjuangan
3	Mohd Shahrul Mat Amin	Yusuf Abrekov	Adiq Husainie Othman	Dadi Suryadi	Yusuf Abrekov	Putra Perjuangan	Putra Perjuangan
4	Mohamed Harrif Salleh	Yusuf Abrekov	Adiq Husainie Othman	Dadi Suryadi	Yusuf Abrekov	Putra Perjuangan	Putra Perjuangan
5	Mohamed Harrif Salleh	Yusuf Abrekov	Adiq Husainie Othman	Dadi Suryadi	Yusuf Abrekov	Putra Perjuangan	Putra Perjuangan
6	Shinichi Fukushima	Yusuf Abrekov	Adiq Husainie Othman	Dadi Suryadi	Yusuf Abrekov	Putra Perjuangan	Putra Perjuangan
Final		Yusuf Abrekov	Adiq Husainie Othman	Dadi Suryadi	Yusuf Abrekov	Putra Perjuangan	Putra Perjuangan

== Stage results ==
=== Stage 1 ===
8 May 2012 — Merdeka Stadium, Kuala Lumpur to Bandar Baru Kampar, 161.5 km (100.4 mi)

	Rider	Team	Time
1	(Japan) Shinichi Fukushima	Terengganu Cycling Team	03h 50' 38"
2	(New Zealand) Michael Torckler	Pure Black Racing Team	s.t.
3	(Indonesia) Hari Fitrianto	Polygon Sweet Nice	s.t.
4	(Ukraine) Volodymyr Zagorodny	Uzbekistan Suren Team	s.t.
5	(Kazakhstan) Andrey Mizurov	RTS Racing Team	s.t.
6	(Germany) Timo Scholz	CCN Cycling Team	+ 18"
7	(Uzbekistan) Yusuf Abrekov	Uzbekistan Suren Team	s.t.
8	(Japan) Kazuhiro Mori	Aisan Racing Team	+ 48"
9	(Malaysia) Adiq Husainie Othman	Malaysia Development Team	s.t.
10	(Australia) Jai Crawford	RTS Racing Team	s.t.

=== Stage 2 ===
9 May 2012 — Bandar Baru Kampar to Kulim, 201.8 km (125.4 mi)

	Rider	Team	Time
1	(Australia) Jai Crawford	RTS Racing Team	05h 07' 42"
2	(Japan) Yasuharu Nakajima	Aisan Racing Team	s.t.
3	(Indonesia) Tonton Susanto	Putra Perjuangan	s.t.
4	(Indonesia) Dadi Suryadi	Putra Perjuangan	s.t.
5	(Uzbekistan) Yusuf Abrekov	Uzbekistan Suren Team	s.t.
6	(Japan) Kazuhiro Mori	Aisan Racing Team	+ 03' 08"
7	(Japan) Shinpei Fukuda	Aisan Racing Team	s.t.
8	(Malaysia) Adiq Husainie Othman	Malaysia Development Team	s.t.
9	(Australia) Joel Pearson	Genesys Wealth Advisers	s.t.
10	(Malaysia) Mohamed Zulhilmi Afif Ahmad Zamri	Terengganu	s.t.

=== Stage 3 ===
10 May 2012 — Kulim to FELDA Chuping, 168.8 km (104.9 mi)

	Rider	Team	Time
1	(Malaysia) Mohd Shahrul Mat Amin	Terengganu Cycling Team	04h 23' 36"
2	(Indonesia) Dani Lesmana	Polygon Sweet Nice	s.t.
3	(Malaysia) Adiq Husainie Othman	Malaysia Development Team	+ 21"
4	(Malaysia) Mohamed Harrif Salleh	Terengganu Cycling Team	+ 01' 58"
5	(Japan) Kazuhiro Mori	Aisan Racing Team	s.t.
6	(Malaysia) Mohamed Zamri Salleh	Terengganu Cycling Team	s.t.
7	(Australia) Alex Carver	Genesys Wealth Advisers	s.t.
8	(Japan) Shinpei Fukuda	Aisan Racing Team	s.t.
9	(New Zealand) Roman van Uden	Pure Black Racing Team	s.t.
10	(Malaysia) Mohd Nur Rizuan Zainal	Malaysian Armed Forces	s.t.

=== Stage 4 ===
11 May 2012 — Kangar to Sungai Petani, 98 km (60.9 mi)

	Rider	Team	Time
1	(Malaysia) Mohamed Harrif Salleh	Terengganu Cycling Team	02h 40' 56"
2	(Japan) Shinpei Fukuda	Aisan Racing Team	s.t.
3	(Australia) Joel Pearson	Genesys Wealth Advisers	s.t.
4	(Malaysia) Mohamed Zamri Salleh	Terengganu Cycling Team	s.t.
5	(New Zealand) Roman van Uden	Pure Black Racing Team	s.t.
6	(Malaysia) Adiq Husainie Othman	Malaysia Development Team	s.t.
7	(Malaysia) Mohd Fauzan Ahmad Lutfi	Royal Malaysia Police	s.t.
8	(Malaysia) Mohamed Zulhilmi Afif Ahmad Zamri	Terengganu	s.t.
9	(Malaysia) Mohamed Fakhrudin Daud	Malaysia Development Team	s.t.
10	(Brunei) Muhammad Raihan Abd Aziz	CCN Cycling Team	s.t.

=== Stage 5 ===
12 May 2012 — Sungai Petani to Ipoh, 193 km (119.9 mi)

	Rider	Team	Time
1	(Malaysia) Mohamed Harrif Salleh	Terengganu Cycling Team	+ 04h 34' 40"
2	(Malaysia) Mohd Nur Rizuan Zainal	Malaysian Armed Forces	s.t.
3	(Australia) Alex Carver	Genesys Wealth Advisers	s.t.
4	(Malaysia) Adiq Husainie Othman	Malaysia Development Team	s.t.
5	(Malaysia) Mohd Saufi Mat Senan	Terengganu Cycling Team	s.t.
6	(New Zealand) Roman van Uden	Pure Black Racing Team	s.t.
7	(Kazakhstan) Andrey Mizurov	RTS Racing Team	s.t.
8	(Netherlands) Lex Nederlof	CCN Cycling Team	s.t.
9	(Australia) Jai Crawford	RTS Racing Team	s.t.
10	(Malaysia) Mohamed Zulhilmi Afif Ahmad Zamri	Terengganu	s.t.

=== Stage 6 ===
13 May 2012 — Ipoh to Merdeka Square, Kuala Lumpur, 199.5 km (124.0 mi)

	Rider	Team	Time
1	(Japan) Shinichi Fukushima	Terengganu Cycling Team	04h 24' 31"
2	(Malaysia) Mohamed Harrif Salleh	Terengganu Cycling Team	+ 03"
3	(Malaysia) Mohamed Zamri Salleh	Terengganu Cycling Team	s.t.
4	(Malaysia) Mohd Nur Rizuan Zainal	Malaysian Armed Forces	s.t.
5	(Malaysia) Adiq Husainie Othman	Malaysia Development Team	s.t.
6	(Malaysia) Suhardi Hassan	Kuala Lumpur	s.t.
7	(Australia) Joel Pearson	Genesys Wealth Advisers	s.t.
8	(Malaysia) Mohamed Zulhilmi Afif Ahmad Zamri	Terengganu	s.t.
9	(Malaysia) Mohd Fauzan Ahmad Lutfi	Royal Malaysia Police	s.t.
10	(Netherlands) Lex Nederlof	CCN Cycling Team	s.t.

== Final standings ==
=== General classification ===
	Rider	Team	Time
1	(Uzbekistan) Yusuf Abrekov	Uzbekistan Suren Team	25h 04' 20"
2	(Australia) Jai Crawford	RTS Racing Team	+ 18"
3	(Japan) Yasuharu Nakajima	Aisan Racing Team	+ 23"
4	(Indonesia) Tonton Susanto	Putra Perjuangan	+ 28"
5	(Indonesia) Dadi Suryadi	Putra Perjuangan	+ 50"
6	(Malaysia) Adiq Husainie Othman	Malaysia Development Team	+ 01' 42"
7	(Japan) Shinichi Fukushima	Terengganu Cycling Team	+ 02' 29"
8	(New Zealand) Michael Torckler	Pure Black Racing Team	+ 02' 46"
9	(Indonesia) Hari Fitrianto	Polygon Sweet Nice	+ 02' 48"
10	(Ukraine) Volodymyr Zagorodniy	Uzbekistan Suren Team	+ 02' 51"

=== Points classification ===
	Rider	Team	Points
1	(Malaysia) Adiq Husainie Othman	Malaysia Development Team	89
2	(Malaysia) Mohamed Harrif Salleh	Terengganu Cycling Team	58
3	(Japan) Kazuhiro Mori	Aisan Racing Team	38
4	(Australia) Jai Crawford	RTS Racing Team	36
5	(Malaysia) Mohamed Zulhilmi Afif Ahmad Zamri	Terengganu	36
6	(Malaysia) Mohamed Zamri Salleh	Terengganu Cycling Team	35
7	(Uzbekistan) Yusuf Abrekov	Uzbekistan Suren Team	33
8	(Japan) Shinichi Fukushima	Terengganu Cycling Team	32
9	(Malaysia) Mohd Nur Rizuan Zainal	Malaysian Armed Forces	32
10	(Japan) Shinpei Fukuda	Aisan Racing Team	31

=== Mountains classification ===
	Rider	Team	Points
1	(Indonesia) Dadi Suryadi	Putra Perjuangan	15
2	(Australia) Jai Crawford	RTS Racing Team	10
3	(Uzbekistan) Yusuf Abrekov	Uzbekistan Suren Team	7
4	(Malaysia) Mohd Saufi Mat Senan	Terengganu Cycling Team	6
5	(Indonesia) Tonton Susanto	Putra Perjuangan	6
6	(Indonesia) Ali Shahbana Agung	Putra Perjuangan	4
7	(Malaysia) Mohd Shahrul Mat Amin	Terengganu Cycling Team	4
8	(New Zealand) Michael Torckler	Pure Black Racing Team	4
9	(Malaysia) Adiq Husainie Othman	Malaysia Development Team	2
10	(Japan) Shinichi Fukushima	Terengganu Cycling Team	2

=== Team classification ===
	Team	Time
1	Putra Perjuangan	75h 17' 44"
2	Uzbekistan Suren Team	+ 01' 50"
3	RTS Racing Team	+ 02' 37"
4	Aisan Racing Team	+ 12' 38"
5	Pure Black Racing Team	+ 22' 35"
6	Polygon Sweet Nice	+ 22' 47"
7	Team LBC Cycling	+ 29' 20"
8	Kazakhstan Cycling Federation	+ 31' 29"
9	CCN Cycling Team	+ 33' 47"
10	Terengganu	+ 34' 59"

=== Asian rider classification ===
	Rider	Team	Time
1	(Uzbekistan) Yusuf Abrekov	Uzbekistan Suren Team	25h 04' 20"
2	(Japan) Yasuharu Nakajima	Aisan Racing Team	+ 23"
3	(Indonesia) Tonton Susanto	Putra Perjuangan	+ 28"
4	(Indonesia) Dadi Suryadi	Putra Perjuangan	+ 50"
5	(Malaysia) Adiq Husainie Othman	Malaysia Development Team	+ 01' 42"
6	(Japan) Shinichi Fukushima	Terengganu Cycling Team	+ 02' 29"
7	(Indonesia) Hari Fitrianto	Polygon Sweet Nice	+ 02' 48"
8	(Kazakhstan) Andrey Mizurov	RTS Racing Team	+ 02' 52"
9	(Malaysia) Mohamed Zulhilmi Afif Ahmad Zamri	Terengganu	+ 03' 38"
10	(Kazakhstan) Sergey Kuzmin	Kazakhstan Cycling Federation	+ 03' 40"

=== Asian team classification ===
	Team	Time
1	Putra Perjuangan	75h 17' 44"
2	Aisan Racing Team	+ 12' 38"
3	Polygon Sweet Nice	+ 22' 47"
4	Team LBC Cycling	+ 29' 20"
5	Kazakhstan Cycling Federation	+ 31' 29"
6	Terengganu	+ 34' 59"
7	Terengganu Cycling Team	+ 36' 05"
8	Royal Malaysia Police	+ 39' 40"
9	Malaysian Armed Forces	+ 58' 23"
10	Malaysia Development Team	+ 59' 48"

=== Malaysian rider classification ===
	Rider	Team	Time
1	(Malaysia) Adiq Husainie Othman	Malaysia Development Team	25h 06' 02"
2	(Malaysia) Mohamed Zulhilmi Afif Ahmad Zamri	Terengganu	+ 01' 56"
3	(Malaysia) Mohd Salahuddin Mat Saman	Royal Malaysia Police	+ 11' 30"
4	(Malaysia) Mohd Saufi Mat Senan	Terengganu Cycling Team	+ 13' 36"
5	(Malaysia) Mohd Shahrul Afiza Fauizan	Malaysian Armed Forces	+ 14' 16"
6	(Malaysia) Mohd Nur Rizuan Zainal	Malaysian Armed Forces	+ 15' 49"
7	(Malaysia) Khairul Azhar	Kedah	+ 15' 52"
8	(Malaysia) Mohd Fauzan Ahmad Lutfi	Royal Malaysia Police	+ 16' 12"
9	(Malaysia) Ahmad Huzairi Abu Bakar	Royal Malaysia Police	s.t.
10	(Malaysia) Muhammad Khairul Azizi Abdullah	Terengganu	+ 16' 20"

=== Malaysian team classification ===
	Team	Time
1	Terengganu	75h 52' 43"
2	Terengganu Cycling Team	+ 04' 41"
3	Royal Malaysia Police	+ 23' 24"
4	Malaysian Armed Forces	+ 23' 51"
5	Malaysia Development Team	+ 24' 49"
6	Kuala Lumpur	+ 01h 02' 01"
7	Selangor	+ 01h 02' 39"

== List of teams and riders ==
A total of 18 teams were invited to participate in the 2012 Jelajah Malaysia. Out of 117 riders, a total of 84 riders made it to the finish in Merdeka Square, Kuala Lumpur.

Terengganu Cycling Team

- (Malaysia) Mohd Shahrul Mat Amin
- (Malaysia) Mohamed Harrif Salleh
- (Malaysia) Mohamed Zamri Salleh
- (Malaysia) Mohd Saufi Mat Senan
- (Japan) Shinichi Fukushima
- (Malaysia) Mohd Nor Umardi Rosdi

Aisan Racing Team

- (Japan) Takeaki Ayabe
- (Japan) Kenichi Suzuki
- (Japan) Kazuhiro Mori
- (Japan) Yasuharu Nakajima
- (Japan) Shinpei Fukuda
- (Japan) Nozomu Kimori

CCN Cycling Team

- (United States) Robert Gitelis
- (Germany) Timo Scholz
- (Netherlands) Lex Nederlof
- (Indonesia) Fito Bako Prilanji
- (Brunei) Muhammad Nurhaimin Awang
- (Brunei) Muhammad Raihan Abd Aziz

Genesys Wealth Advisers

- (Australia) Thomas Robinson
- (Australia) Kane Walker
- (Australia) Kyle Marwood
- (Australia) Alex Carver
- (Australia) Joel Pearson
- (Australia) Nicholas Sanderson

RTS Racing Team

- (Kazakhstan) Andrey Mizurov
- (United Kingdom) Alex Coutts
- (Australia) Jai Crawford
- (United Kingdom) Lee Rodgers
- (Chinese Taipei) Chang Wei Kei

Uzbekistan Suren Team

- (Uzbekistan) Vadim Shaekov
- (Uzbekistan) Valeriy Kobzarenko
- (Uzbekistan) Yusuf Abrekov
- (Ukraine) Volodymyr Starchyk
- (Uzbekistan) Azamat Turaev
- (Ukraine) Volodymyr Zagorodniy

Malaysia Development Team

- (Malaysia) Adiq Husainie Othman
- (Malaysia) Mohammad Al-Ghazali Abd Hamid
- (Malaysia) Wan Syazwan Afiq Wan Shahril Anwar
- (Malaysia) Ahmad Fahmi Farhan Ahmad Fuat
- (Malaysia) Mohd Fakhruddin Daud

Kazakhstan Cycling Federation

- (Kazakhstan) Sergey Kuzmin
- (Kazakhstan) Ivan Chernyavskiy
- (Kazakhstan) Ilya Chaplygin
- (Kazakhstan) Ivan Sivash

Malaysian Armed Forces

- (Malaysia) Mohd Nur Rizuan Zainal
- (Malaysia) Mohd Shahrul Nizam Che Shamsudin
- (Malaysia) Mohd Fadhli Anwar Mohd Fauzi
- (Malaysia) Mohd Shahrul Afiza Fauizan
- (Malaysia) Amirul Aswandi Amran

Royal Malaysia Police

- (Malaysia) Mohd Fauzan Ahmad Lutfi
- (Malaysia) Nik Mohd Azwan Zulkifle
- (Malaysia) Mohd Salahuddin Mat Saman
- (Malaysia) Ahmad Huzairi Abu Bakar

Kedah

- (Malaysia) Khairul Azhar

Kuala Lumpur

- (Malaysia) Ahmad Fallanie Ali
- (Malaysia) Suhardi Hassan
- (Malaysia) Wan Mohamed Najmee Wan Mohammed
- (Malaysia) Thum Weng Kin
- (Malaysia) Mohammed Razif Salleh
- (Malaysia) Hoh Jin Cheng

Negeri Sembilan

- (Malaysia) Amirul Anuar Jafri
- (Malaysia) Mohd Ekbar Zamanhuri
- (Malaysia) Abdul Rashid Ibrahim

Selangor

- (Malaysia) Muhammad Rauf Nur Misbah
- (Malaysia) Muhammad Akmal Amrun
- (Malaysia) Muhammad Faiz Izzuddin Omar
- (Malaysia) Abdul Azim Abdul Latif
- (Malaysia) Muhammad Hazwan Azmen

Terengganu

- (Malaysia) Muhammad Zulhilmie Afif Ahmad Zamri
- (Malaysia) Muhammad Khairul Azizi Abdullah
- (Malaysia) Sofian Nabil Omar Mohd Bakri
- (Malaysia) Mohamad Harif Murlis
- (Malaysia) Mohd Fahmi Irfan M. Zailani
- (Malaysia) Che Ku Mohd Wafiuddin Che Ku Zuki

Polygon Sweet Nice

- (Indonesia) Hari Fitrianto
- (Indonesia) Dani Lesmana
- (Indonesia) Bambang Suryadi
- (Indonesia) Dealton Nur Arif Prayogo
- (Indonesia) Agung Riyanto
- (Indonesia) Antonius Christopher Tjondrokusumo

Pure Black Racing Team

- (New Zealand) Roman van Uden
- (New Zealand) James Williamson
- (New Zealand) Michael Torckler
- (New Zealand) Louis Crosby
- (New Zealand) Shem Rodger

Putra Perjuangan

- (Indonesia) Tonton Susanto
- (Indonesia) Suherman Heryadi
- (Indonesia) Dadi Suryadi
- (Indonesia) Ali Shahbana Agung
- (Indonesia) Arin Iswana
- (Indonesia) Chelly Aristya

Team LBC Cycling

- (Philippines) Mark Julius S. Bonzo
- (Philippines) Jemico Brioso
- (Philippines) Jay Bob P. Pagnanawon
- (Philippines) John Gerald Mendoza
- (Philippines) Kelvin John T. Mendoza
- (Philippines) George Luis Oconer
