= 2011–12 UCI Asia Tour =

- Eighth edition of the UCI Asia Tour

Details
- Dates: 2 October 2011–30 September 2012
- Location: Asia
- Races: 27

Champions
- Individual champion: Hossein Alizadeh (IRI) (Tabriz Petrochemical Team)
- Teams' champion: Terengganu Cycling Team
- Nations' champion: Kazakhstan

The 2011–12 UCI Asia Tour was the 8th season of the UCI Asia Tour. The season began on 2 October 2011 with the Tour d'Indonesia and ended on 30 September 2012 with the Tour de Brunei.

The points leader, based on the cumulative results of previous races, wears the UCI Asia Tour cycling jersey. Mehdi Sohrabi from Iran was the defending champion of the 2010–11 UCI Asia Tour. Hossein Alizadeh of Iran was crowned as the 2011–12 UCI Asia Tour champion.

Throughout the season, points are awarded to the top finishers of stages within stage races and the final general classification standings of each of the stages races and one-day events. The quality and complexity of a race also determines how many points are awarded to the top finishers, the higher the UCI rating of a race, the more points are awarded.

The UCI ratings from highest to lowest are as follows:

- Multi-day events: 2.HC, 2.1 and 2.2
- One-day events: 1.HC, 1.1 and 1.2

== Events ==
=== 2011 ===
Date	Race Name	Location	UCI Rating	Winner	Team
2–12 October	Tour d'Indonesia	Indonesia	2.2	Eric Sheppard (AUS)	Plan B Racing Team
20–28 October	Tour of Hainan	China	2.HC	Valentin Iglinsky (KAZ)	Astana
23 October	Japan Cup	Japan	1.HC	Ivan Basso (ITA)	Liquigas–Cannondale
1–5 November	Tour of Taihu Lake	China	2.2	Boris Shpilevsky (RUS)	Tabriz Petrochemical Team
12–13 November	Tour de Okinawa	Japan	2.2	Kazuhiro Mori (JPN)	Aisan Racing Team

=== 2012 ===
Date	Race Name	Location	UCI Rating	Winner	Team
5–10 February	Tour of Qatar	Qatar	2.HC	Tom Boonen (BEL)	Omega Pharma–Quick-Step
14–19 February	Tour of Oman	Oman	2.1	Peter Velits (SVK)	Omega Pharma–Quick-Step
15 February	Asian Cycling Championships – Time trial	Malaysia	CC	Eugen Wacker (KGZ)	Kyrgyzstan (national team)
18 February	Asian Cycling Championships – Road race	Malaysia	CC	Wong Kam-po (HKG)	Hong Kong (national team)
24 February–4 March	Tour de Langkawi	Malaysia	2.HC	José Serpa (COL)	Androni Giocattoli–Venezuela
10–16 March	Tour de Taiwan	Taiwan	2.1	Rhys Pollock (AUS)	Drapac Cycling
1–6 April	Tour of Thailand	Thailand	2.2	Mitchell Lovelock-Fay (AUS)	Australia (national team)
14–17 April	Le Tour de Filipinas	Philippines	2.2	Baler Ravina (PHI)	GO21
22–29 April	Tour de Korea	South Korea	2.2	Park Sung-Baek (KOR)	KSPO Cycling Team
27 April–1 May	Tour de Borneo	Malaysia	2.2	Michael Torckler (NZL)	PureBlack Racing
8–13 May	Jelajah Malaysia	Malaysia	2.2	Yusuf Abrekov (UZB)	Uzbekistan Suren Team
11–16 May	Azerbaïjan Tour	Iran	2.2	Javier Ramírez (ESP)	Andalucía
20–27 May	Tour of Japan	Japan	2.2	Fortunato Baliani (ITA)	Team Nippo
31 May–3 June	Tour de Kumano	Japan	2.2	Fortunato Baliani (ITA)	Team Nippo
4–10 June	Tour de Singkarak	Indonesia	2.2	Óscar Pujol (ESP)	Azad University Cross Team
17 June	Tour de Jakarta	Indonesia	1.2	Chris Joven (PHI)	American Vinyl–LPGMA's
29 June–12 July	Tour of Qinghai Lake	China	2.HC	Hossein Alizadeh (IRI)	Tabriz Petrochemical Team
29 August–1 September	Tour de East Java	Indonesia	2.2	Ivan Tsissaruk (KAZ)	Astana Track Team
7–13 September	Tour of China I	China	2.1	Martin Pedersen (DEN)	Christina Watches–Onfone
15–17 September	Tour de Hokkaido	Japan	2.2	Maximiliano Richeze (ARG)	Team Nippo
16–23 September	Tour of China II	China	2.1	Stefan Schumacher (GER)	Christina Watches–Onfone
26–30 September	Tour de Brunei	Brunei	2.2	Hossein Askari (IRI)	Tabriz Petrochemical Team

== Final standings ==
=== Individual classification ===
Rank	Name	Team	Points
1.	Hossein Alizadeh (IRI)	Tabriz Petrochemical Team	223
2.	Stefan Schumacher (GER)	Christina Watches–Onfone	221.33
3.	Andrea Guardini (ITA)	Farnese Vini–Selle Italia	216
4.	Wong Kam-po (HKG)	Hong Kong (national team)	210
5.	Taiji Nishitani (JPN)	Aisan Racing Team	207
6.	Luka Mezgec (SLO)	Sava	186
7.	José Serpa (COL)	Androni Giocattoli–Venezuela	180
8.	Mohamed Harrif Salleh (MAS)	Terengganu Cycling Team	145
9.	Maximiliano Richeze (ARG)	Team Nippo	129
10.	Cameron Wurf (AUS)	Champion System	121.33

=== Team classification ===
Rank	Team	Points
1.	Terengganu Cycling Team	539
2.	Tabriz Petrochemical Team	440
3.	Christina Watches–Onfone	432.98
4.	Team Nippo	417
5.	Champion System	414.99
6.	Aisan Racing Team	346
7.	Androni Giocattoli–Venezuela	290
8.	Team Type 1–Sanofi	288
9.	Genesys Wealth Advisers	267
10.	Farnese Vini–Selle Italia	258

=== Nation classification ===
Rank	Nation	Points
1.	Kazakhstan	856.84
2.	Japan	841
3.	Malaysia	592
4.	Iran	557
5.	Hong Kong	449
6.	South Korea	289
7.	Uzbekistan	245
8.	Indonesia	207
9.	Philippines	183
10.	Kyrgyzstan	170

=== Nation under-23 classification ===
Rank	Nation under-23	Points
1.	Kazakhstan	613.34
2.	Malaysia	183
3.	Japan	116
4.	Indonesia	92
5.	Iran	73
5.	Hong Kong	73
7.	Vietnam	53
8.	South Korea	46
9.	Philippines	43
10.	Singapore	35
