= Lake Taupo Cycle Challenge =

Annual cycling event in New Zealand

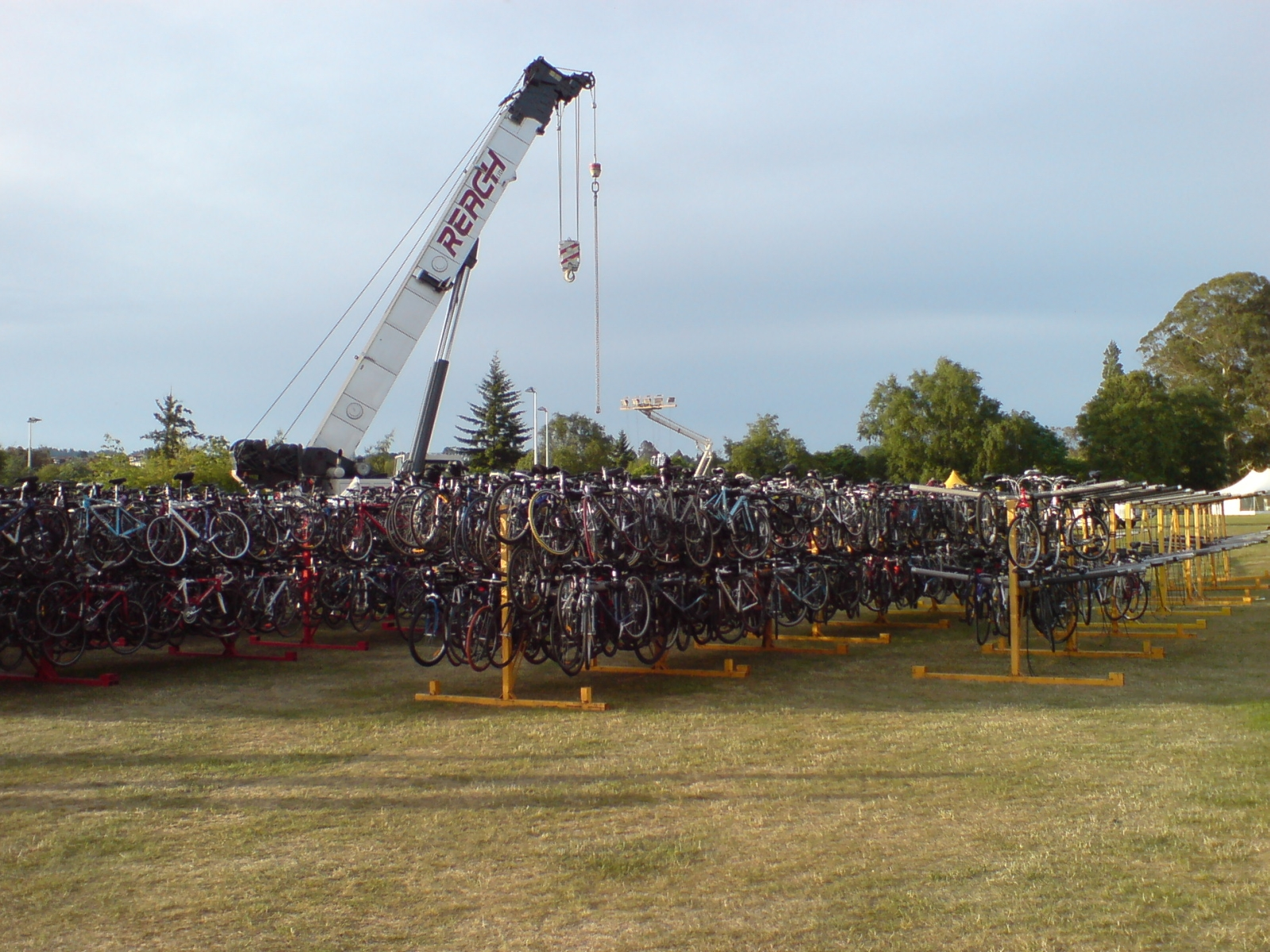
Relay bikes being prepared for transport (2007).

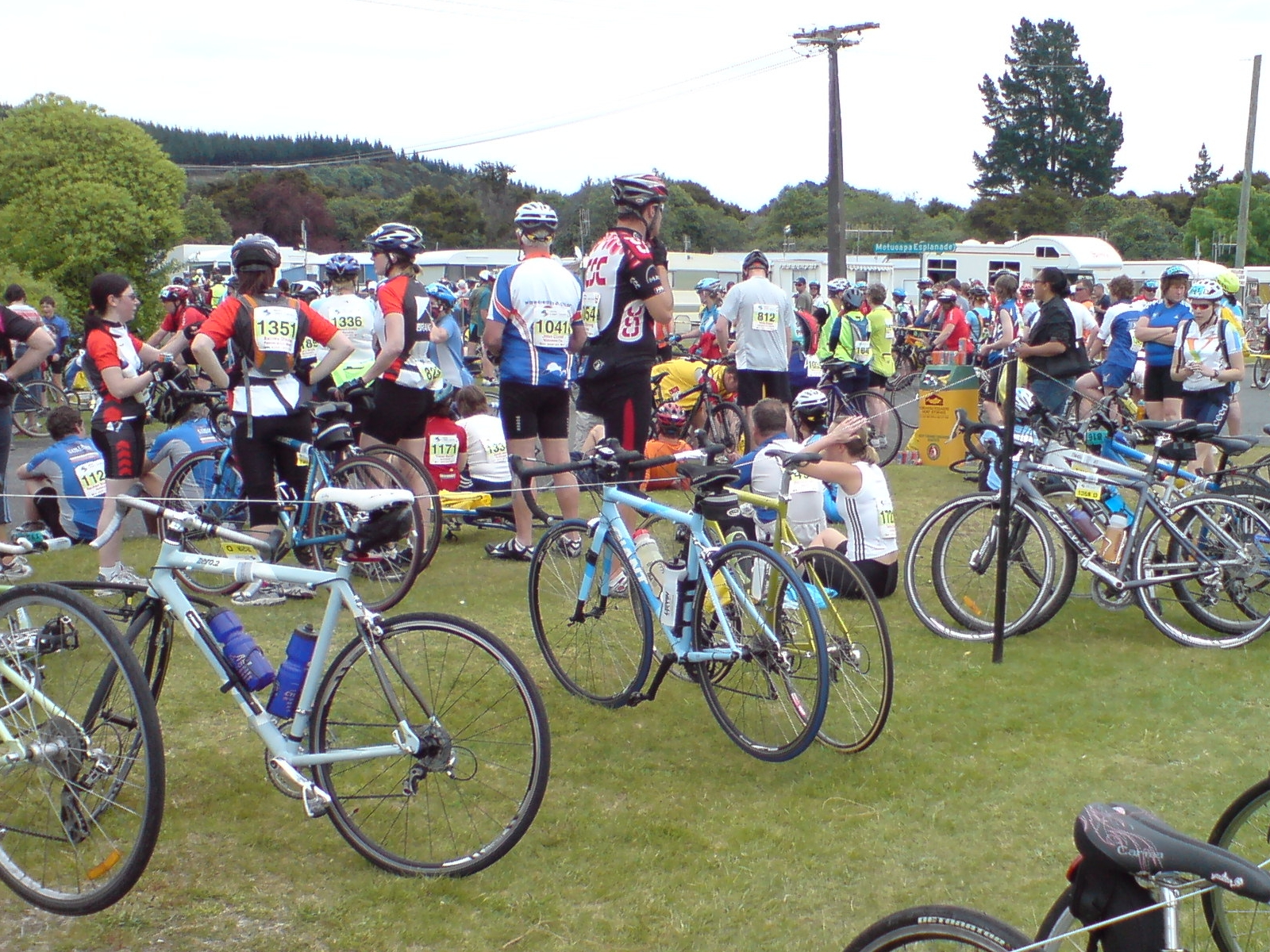
Relay riders waiting for their teammates (2007).

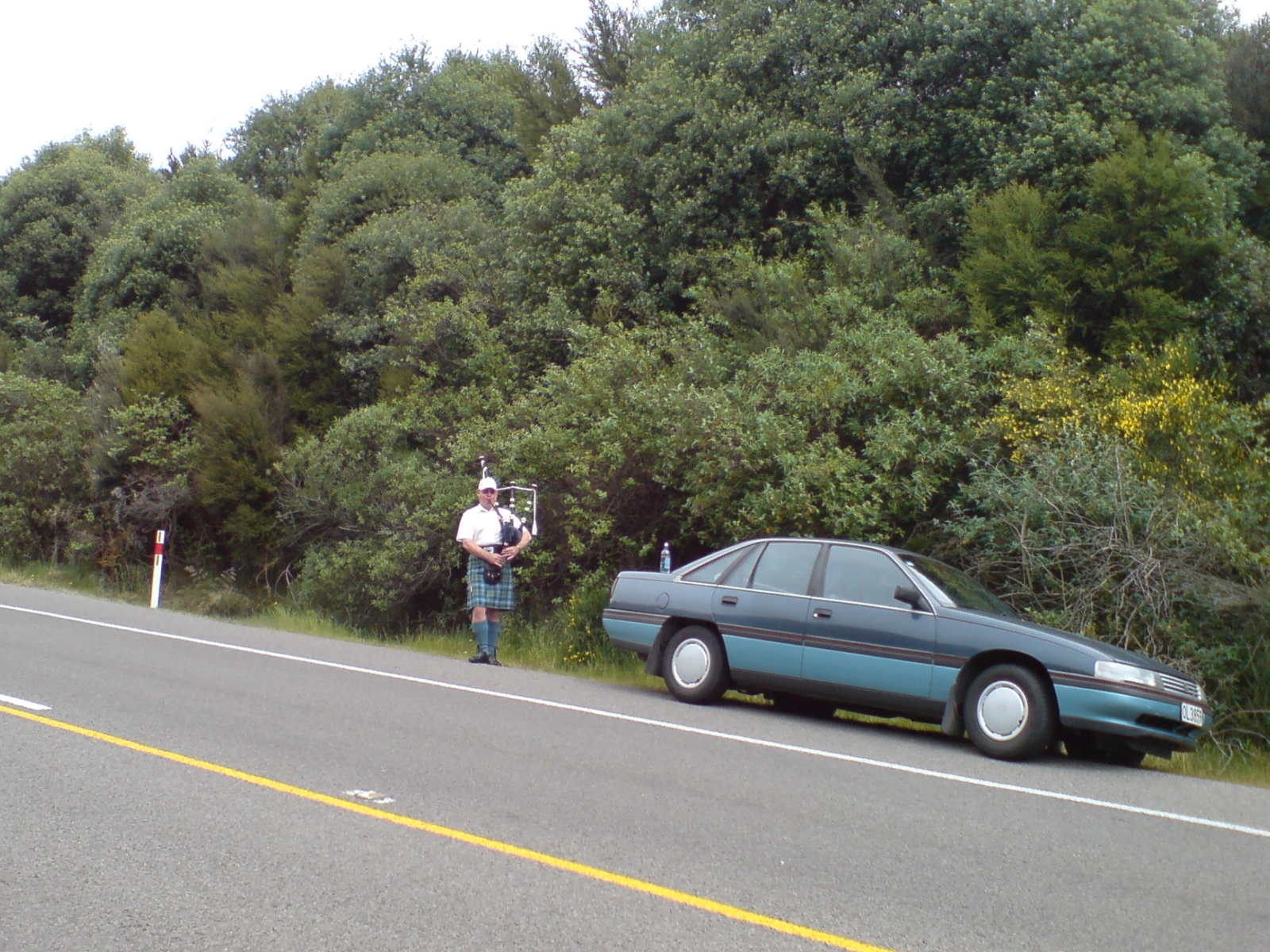
The bagpiper on Hatepe Hill (2007).

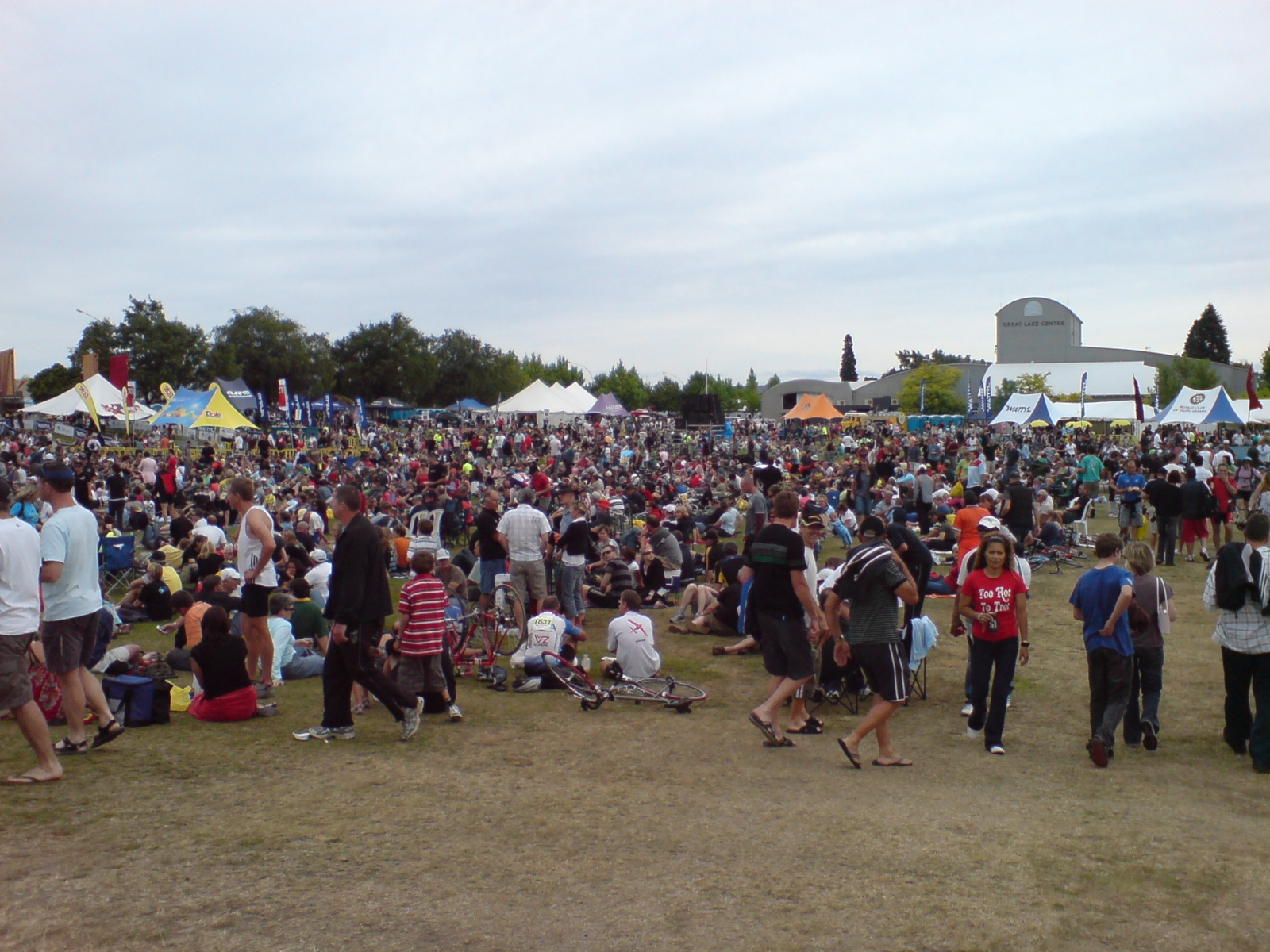
Aftermath crowds on the Taupo Domain (2007).

The Lake Taupo Cycle Challenge is New Zealand's largest mass participation cycling event. First held in 1977, it takes place on the last Saturday of each November and circumnavigates Lake Taupō, a volcanic crater lake in the centre of the North Island. The ride starts and finishes in Taupō with one full circuit being approximately 160 km. Around 7,000 riders take part each year.

== Categories ==
The event aims to cater for all riders, from the elite racers to those just wishing to make it around. This is reflected in the range of finishing times - from under 4 to over 10 hours. Riders are asked to nominate finishing times and staggered starts are used to group riders by ability.

Subcategories of the event are (2022 data):

- Round The Lake: A one lap circuit of Lake Taupō, starting and finishing in Taupō and following Poihipi Road and State Highways 32, 41 and 1. Approximately 160 km.
- Length Of The Lake: One half of the full circuit, starting at Tūrangi and finishing in Taupō. Approximately 80 km.
- Lakesider: A 16 km leisure ride for recreational cyclists, mostly off-road.
- Enduro: An option for individuals who ride multiple laps of the lake circuit (normally either two, four or eight, - this is certified as a qualifying brevet for Paris–Brest–Paris and RAAM).
- Huka Mountain Bike: Mountain bike challenges of 35 km, 60 km or 85 km, and an 85 km elite licensed rider race.
- Men's Classic Road Race: An official BikeNZ sanctioned race. Participants set off before the rest of the riders, competing in a full-on race, with a current racing license required, and entry limited to 100 riders. Riders must have a previous best time in the main event of under 4:30.
- Women's Classic Road Race: A women's only 100 km race for licensed riders from Taupō to Tūrangi and return.

== Records ==
- Fastest Round the Lake (male): Sam Gaze 3:37 (2017 Men's Classic winner)
- Fastest Round the Lake (female): Susy Pryde 3:57 (1999)

== Past winners ==
Year	Men's winner	Women's winner
1998	(New Zealand) Darren Murray	(New Zealand) Susy Pryde
1999	(New Zealand) Lee Vertongen	(New Zealand) Susy Pryde
2000	(New Zealand) Jason Kelly, Patrick Kelly & John Barry (Tridem)	(New Zealand) Susy Pryde
2001	(New Zealand) Marcel Hollenstein	(New Zealand) Michelle Hyland
2002	(Netherlands) Paul de Rijk	(New Zealand) Melissa Pilla
2003	(New Zealand) Matthew Yates	(New Zealand) Roz Reekie-May
2004	(New Zealand) Jeremy Yates	(New Zealand) Nadene Boyle
2005	(New Zealand) Peter Latham	(New Zealand) Meshy Holt
2006	(New Zealand) Hamish Bond	(New Zealand) Brei Gudsell
2007	(New Zealand) Gordon McCauley	(New Zealand) Kerri-Anne Torckler
2008	(New Zealand) Peter Latham	(New Zealand) Kaytee Boyd
2009	(New Zealand) Jeremy Yates	(New Zealand) Melissa Holt
2010	(New Zealand) Roman Van Uden	(New Zealand) Karen Fulton
2011	(New Zealand) Michael Torckler	(New Zealand) Kaytee Boyd
2012	(New Zealand) Mike Northey	(New Zealand) Rushlee Buchanan
2013	(New Zealand) Michael Torckler	(New Zealand) Reta Trotman
2014	(New Zealand) Patrick Bevin	(New Zealand) Ruby Livingstone
2015	(New Zealand) Dion Smith	(New Zealand) Racquel Sheath
2016	(New Zealand) Aaron Gate	(New Zealand) Racquel Sheath
2017	(New Zealand) Sam Gaze	(Australia) Matilda Raynolds
2018	(New Zealand) Hamish Bond	(New Zealand) Ione Johnson
2019	(New Zealand) Kees Duyvesteyn	(New Zealand) Sharlotte Lucas
2020	No race due COVID-19 pandemic in New Zealand	
2021	No race due COVID-19 pandemic in New Zealand	
2022	(New Zealand) Michael Torckler	(New Zealand) Claudia Weidekam
