= 2009 Tour de Langkawi =

2008–09 UCI Asia Tour, race 17 of 31

Race details
- Dates: 9–15 February 2009
- Stages: 7
- Distance: 1,031.7 km (641.1 mi)
- Winning time: 24h 22' 12"

Results
Jersey awarded to the overall winner	Winner	José Serpa (COL)	(Diquigiovanni–Androni)
	Second	Jai Crawford (AUS)	(Australia)
	Third	Jackson Rodríguez (VEN)	(Diquigiovanni–Androni)
Jersey awarded to the points classification winner	Points	Mattia Gavazzi (ITA)	(Diquigiovanni–Androni)
Jersey awarded to the mountains classification winner	Mountains	José Serpa (COL)	(Diquigiovanni–Androni)
	Team	Diquigiovanni–Androni	

The 2009 Tour de Langkawi was the 14th edition of the Tour de Langkawi, a cycling stage race that took place in Malaysia. The race began on 9 February in Putrajaya and ended on 15 February in Dataran Merdeka, Kuala Lumpur. In fact this race was sanctioned by the Union Cycliste Internationale (UCI) as a 2.HC (hors category) race on the 2008–09 UCI Asia Tour calendar.

Colombian cyclist, José Serpa emerged as the winner of the race, followed by Jai Crawford second and Jackson Rodríguez third. Mattia Gavazzi won the points classification category and José Serpa won the mountains classification category. Diquigiovanni–Androni won the team classification category.

== Teams ==
20 teams accepted invitations to participate in the 2009 Tour de Langkawi.

- Diquigiovanni–Androni
- Bbox Bouygues Telecom
- Garmin–Slipstream
- Ag2r–La Mondiale
- Fuji–Servetto
- Cervélo TestTeam
- CSF Group–Navigare
- ISD
- Vorarlberg–Corratec
- EQA-Meitan Hompo-Graphite Design
- Seoul Cycling Team
- Doha Team
- LeTua Cycling Team
- MNCF Cycling Team
- Malaysia ‡
- Australia ‡
- South Africa ‡
- Iran ‡
- Kazakhstan
- China ‡

‡: National teams

== Stages ==
The cyclists competed in 7 stages, covering a distance of 1031.7 kilometres.

Stage	Date	Course	Distance	Stage result		
Stage	Date	Course	Distance	Winner	Second	Third
1	9 February	Putrajaya to Senawang	133.8 km (83.1 mi)	Mattia Gavazzi (ITA)	Chris Sutton (AUS)	Nolan Hoffman (RSA)
2	10 February	Senawang to Malacca	160.9 km (100.0 mi)	Mattia Gavazzi (ITA)	Nolan Hoffman (RSA)	Aurélien Clerc (SUI)
3	11 February	Malacca	186 km (115.6 mi)	Mattia Gavazzi (ITA)	Chris Sutton (AUS)	Aurélien Clerc (SUI)
4	12 February	Malacca to Bangi	221 km (137.3 mi)	Samai Amari (INA)	Mattia Gavazzi (ITA)	Nolan Hoffman (RSA)
5	13 February	Petaling Jaya to Genting Highlands	102 km (63.4 mi)	José Serpa (COL)	Jai Crawford (AUS)	Jackson Rodríguez (VEN)
6	14 February	Batang Kali to Shah Alam	147.6 km (91.7 mi)	Mattia Gavazzi (ITA)	Aurélien Clerc (SUI)	Chris Sutton (AUS)
7	15 February	Kuala Lumpur Criterium	80.4 km (50.0 mi)	Yohann Gène (FRA)	Guillermo Bongiorno (ARG)	Mattia Gavazzi (ITA)

== Classification leadership ==
Stage	Winner	General classification	Points classification	Mountains classification	Asian rider classification	Team classification	Asian team classification
1	Mattia Gavazzi	Mattia Gavazzi	Mattia Gavazzi	Jaco Venter	Dmitriy Gruzdev	South Africa	Malaysia
2	Mattia Gavazzi	Mattia Gavazzi	Mattia Gavazzi	Jacques Janse van Rensburg	Dmitriy Gruzdev	South Africa	Malaysia
3	Mattia Gavazzi	Mattia Gavazzi	Mattia Gavazzi	Jacques Janse van Rensburg	Dmitriy Gruzdev	South Africa	Malaysia
4	Samai Amari	Mattia Gavazzi	Mattia Gavazzi	Jeremy Yates	Samai Amari	South Africa	EQA-Meitan Hompo-Graphite Design
5	José Serpa	José Serpa	Mattia Gavazzi	José Serpa	Tonton Susanto	Diquigiovanni–Androni	Iran
6	Mattia Gavazzi	José Serpa	Mattia Gavazzi	José Serpa	Tonton Susanto	Diquigiovanni–Androni	Iran
7	Yohann Gène	José Serpa	Mattia Gavazzi	José Serpa	Tonton Susanto	Diquigiovanni–Androni	Iran
Final		José Serpa	Mattia Gavazzi	José Serpa	Tonton Susanto	Diquigiovanni–Androni	Iran

== Final standings ==
=== General classification ===
	Rider	Team	Time
1	José Serpa (COL)	Diquigiovanni–Androni	24h 22' 12"
2	Jai Crawford (AUS)	Australia	+ 27"
3	Jackson Rodríguez (VEN)	Diquigiovanni–Androni	+ 47"
4	Fredrik Kessiakoff (SWE)	Fuji–Servetto	+ 54"
5	Johann Tschopp (SUI)	Bbox Bouygues Telecom	+ 01' 22"
6	Jacques Janse van Rensburg (RSA)	South Africa	+ 02' 29"
7	Tonton Susanto (INA)	LeTua Cycling Team	+ 02' 44"
8	Lucas Euser (USA)	Garmin–Slipstream	+ 03' 16"
9	José Ángel Gómez Marchante (ESP)	Cervélo TestTeam	+ 03' 37"
10	Richie Porte (AUS)	Australia	+ 03' 44"

=== Points classification ===
	Rider	Team	Points
1	(Italy) Mattia Gavazzi	Diquigiovanni–Androni	97
2	(South Africa) Nolan Hoffman	South Africa	82
3	(Switzerland) Aurélien Clerc	Ag2r–La Mondiale	62
4	(Australia) Chris Sutton	Garmin–Slipstream	49
5	(Australia) Hilton Clarke	Fuji–Servetto	37
6	(Austria) René Haselbacher	Vorarlberg–Corratec	34
7	(Japan) Miyataka Shimizu	EQA-Meitan Hompo-Graphite Design	33
8	(Japan) Yukiya Arashiro	Bbox Bouygues Telecom	30
9	(South Africa) Christoff Van Heerden	South Africa	27
10	(Germany) Daniel Musiol	Vorarlberg–Corratec	27

=== Mountains classification ===
	Rider	Team	Points
1	(Colombia) José Serpa	Diquigiovanni–Androni	25
2	(Australia) Jai Crawford	Australia	22
3	(Venezuela) Jackson Rodríguez	Diquigiovanni–Androni	20
4	(New Zealand) Jeremy Yates	LeTua Cycling Team	17
5	(South Africa) Jacques Janse van Rensburg	South Africa	12
6	(Sweden) Fredrik Kessiakoff	Fuji–Servetto	12
7	(South Africa) Christoff Van Heerden	South Africa	11
8	(Switzerland) Johann Tschopp	Bbox Bouygues Telecom	10
9	(Venezuela) Carlos José Ochoa	Diquigiovanni–Androni	8
10	(Indonesia) Tonton Susanto	LeTua Cycling Team	5

=== Asian rider classification ===
	Rider	Team	Time
1	(Indonesia) Tonton Susanto	LeTua Cycling Team	24h 24' 56"
2	(Iran) Hossein Askari	Iran	+ 02' 13"
3	(South Korea) Gong Hyo-Suk	Seoul Cycling Team	+ 03' 12"
4	(Iran) Ghader Mizbani	Iran	+ 03' 37"
5	(China) Ji Jianhua	China	+ 03' 58"
6	(Kazakhstan) Alexandr Shushemoin	Kazakhstan	+ 04' 13"
7	(South Korea) Hong Yoo-Ki	Seoul Cycling Team	+ 06' 17"
8	(Kazakhstan) Nazar Jumabekov	Kazakhstan	+ 06' 20"
9	(Japan) Shinichi Fukushima	EQA-Meitan Hompo-Graphite Design	+ 07' 03"
10	(Kazakhstan) Roman Zhiyentayev	Kazakhstan	+ 07' 35"

=== Team classification ===
	Team	Time
1	Diquigiovanni–Androni	73h 09' 16"
2	Australia	+ 07' 19"
3	Fuji–Servetto	+ 11' 19"
4	Cervélo TestTeam	+ 11' 30"
5	Garmin–Slipstream	+ 15' 14"
6	South Africa	+ 18' 32"
7	Iran	+ 19' 04"
8	Ag2r–La Mondiale	+ 20' 45"
9	LeTua Cycling Team	+ 22' 22"
10	Kazakhstan	+ 23' 24"

=== Asian team classification ===
	Team	Time
1	Iran	73h 28' 20"
2	LeTua Cycling Team	+ 03' 18"
3	Kazakhstan	+ 04' 20"
4	Seoul Cycling Team	+ 05' 17"
5	EQA-Meitan Hompo-Graphite Design	+ 13' 23"
6	China	+ 14' 33"
7	MNCF Cycling Team	+ 18' 33"
8	Malaysia	+ 50' 09"
