= Ryan Ariehaan =

Indonesian cyclist (born 1979)

Personal information
- Full name: Ryan Ariehaan
- Born: March 4, 1979 (age 47) Bengkulu, Indonesia

Cycling career
- Sport: Cycling
- Discipline: Road
- Role: Rider

Amateur teams
- 2016: Customs Cycling Club
- 2017: Nex

Professional teams
- 2008–2009: LeTua Cycling Team
- 2018: Nex CCN
Medal record
Men's Cycling
Representing Indonesia
SEA Games
| Gold medal – first place | 2007 SEA Games | Men's road race |
| Gold medal – first place | 2009 SEA Games | Men's time trial |

Ryan Ariehaan (born March 4, 1979) is an Indonesian professional racing cyclist.

== Major results ==
2004
1st Stage 6 Tour d'Indonesia
2005
4th Overall Tour d'Indonesia
2007
1st Road Race, Southeast Asian Games
2008
2nd National Road Race Championships
2009
Southeast Asian Games

1st Time trial
8th Road race

2010
9th Tour de Jakarta
2011
6th Road race, Southeast Asian Games
2013
4th Time trial, Southeast Asian Games
2016
6th Tour de Jakarta
2017
4th Overall Tour de Selangor
