= Hari Fitrianto =

Indonesian cyclist

Personal information
- Born: 20 June 1985 (age 41)

Cycling career
- Sport: Cycling
- Current team: Banyuwangi RC
- Discipline: Road
- Role: Rider

Amateur team
- 2019–: Banyuwangi RC

Professional teams
- 2006–2010: Polygon Sweet Nice
- 2013–2018: CCN

Hari Fitrianto (born 20 June 1985) is an Indonesian cyclist riding for Banyuwangi RC.

== Major results ==
2007
8th Overall Tour of Hong Kong Shanghai
2008
5th Overall Tour d'Indonesia
5th Overall Jelajah Negeri Sembilan
8th Overall Tour de East Java
8th Overall Jelajah Malaysia
2009
7th Overall Jelajah Malaysia
10th Overall Tour d'Indonesia
2010
3rd Overall Tour de East Java
6th Overall Tour d'Indonesia

1st Stage 1 (TTT)

2011
1st Road race, Southeast Asian Games
8th Overall Tour of Singkarak
2012
2nd Tour de Jakarta
4th Overall Tour of East Java
5th Overall Tour de Ijen
9th Overall Jelajah Malaysia
2013
2nd Overall Tour de East Java
2014
8th Melaka Chief Minister Cup
10th Overall Tour de Filipinas
2015
2nd Overall Tour de Borneo
2016
7th Overall Tour de Ijen
2017
4th Overall Jelajah Malaysia
