= 2007 Tour of Siam =

Cycling stage race

The 2007 Tour of Siam was the third and last edition of Tour of Siam, a cycling stage race that took place in Thailand. It began on 20 January in Suphanburi and ended on 25 January 2007 in Phetchaburi. The race was sanctioned by International Cycling Union as a 2.2 race category as part of the 2006–07 UCI Asia Tour.

== Stages ==
Stage	Date	Course	Distance	Stage result		
Stage	Date	Course	Distance	Winner	Second	Third
1	20 January	Suphanburi to Don Chedi	128.9 km (80.1 mi)	Ger Soepenberg (NED)	Sergey Koudentsov (RUS)	Takashi Miyazawa (JPN)
2	21 January	Kanchanaburi to Si Nakharindra Dam	160.1 km (99.5 mi)	Koji Fukushima (JPN)	Hossein Askari (IRI)	Wong Kam-po (HKG)
3	22 January	Si Nakharindra Dam to Wachiralongkorn Dam	133.3 km (82.8 mi)	Ahmad Haidar Anuawar (MAS)	Takashi Miyazawa (JPN)	Ger Soepenberg (NED)
4	23 January	Wachiralongkorn Dam	184.1 km (114.4 mi)	Ghader Mizbani (IRI)	Jai Crawford (AUS)	Pol Nabben (NED)
5	24 January	Wachiralongkorn Dam to Kanchanaburi	169.0 km (105.0 mi)	Stephen Wooldridge (AUS)	Takashi Miyazawa (JPN)	Kai Tsun Lam (HKG)
6	25 January	Kanchanaburi to Phetchaburi	186.4 km (115.8 mi)	Ger Soepenberg (NED)	Sergey Koudentsov (RUS)	Serguei Timofeev (RUS)

== Final standings ==
=== General classification ===
	Rider	Team	Time
1	Jai Crawford (AUS)	Giant Asia Racing Team	24h 04' 43"
2	Yukihiro Doi (JPN)	Skil–Shimano	+ 26"
3	William Ford (AUS)	Savings & Loans Cycling Team	+ 53"
4	Koji Fukushima (JPN)	Giant Asia Racing Team	+ 56"
5	Ghader Mizbani (IRI)	Giant Asia Racing Team	+ 1' 03"
6	Hossein Askari (IRI)	Giant Asia Racing Team	+ 1' 29"
7	Lex Nederlof (NED)		+ 1' 31"
8	Wong Kam-po (HKG)	Hong Kong (national team)	+ 1' 51"
9	Yevgeniy Yakovlev (KAZ)	Polygon Sweet Nice	+ 1' 53"
10	Jacob Nielsen (DEN)	Glud & Marstrand	+ 1' 56"
