= Tonton Susanto =

Indonesian cyclist

Personal information
- Full name: Tonton Susanto
- Born: 24 September 1972 (age 54) Indonesia

Cycling career
- Sport: Cycling
- Current team: Retired
- Discipline: Road
- Role: Rider

Professional teams
- 2002: Telekom Malaysia Cycling Team
- 2002–2003: Giant Asia Racing Team
- 2004–2006: Wismilak Cycling Team
- 2007–2009: LeTua Cycling Team
- 2010–2011: Azad University Iran
- 2014: Pegasus Continental Cycling Team

Major wins
- WCS seri ke XI di Solo (2004); Tour de Jakarta (2005); Jelajah Malaysia (2008)
Medal record
Men's road cycling
Representing Indonesia
Southeast Asian Games
Gold medal – first place	2011 Jakarta–Palembang	Time trial
Silver medal – second place	2007 Nakhon Ratchasima	Time trial
Silver medal – second place	2005 Manila	Time trial
Asian Cycling Championships
Silver medal – second place	2002 Bangkok	Time trial

Tonton Susanto (born 24 September 1972) is an Indonesian former professional racing cyclist.

== Major results ==
1997
1st Stage 13 Tour de Filipinas
2001
2nd Overall Perlis Open
2002
2nd Time trial, Asian Road Championships
3rd Overall Tour of China
4th Time trial, Asian Games
2004
1st WCS seri ke XI di Solo
2005
1st Tour de Jakarta
2nd Time trial, Southeast Asian Games
2006
7th Overall Tour de East Java
10th Time trial, Asian Games
2007
Southeast Asian Games

2nd Time trial
9th Road race

2nd Overall Tour of Thailand
5th Time trial, Asian Road Championships
10th Overall Tour de East Java
2008
1st Overall Jelajah Malaysia
5th Overall Tour de East Java

1st Stage 1

7th Overall Tour de Indonesia
2009
7th Overall Tour de Langkawi
10th Overall Jelajah Malaysia
10th Overall Tour de Singkarak
2011
Southeast Asian Games

1st Time trial
7th Road race

2012
4th Overall Jelajah Malaysia
7th Overall Tour de Singkarak
7th Overall Tour de Borneo
10th Tour de Jakarta
2013
9th Overall Tour de Ijen
2015
7th Time trial, Southeast Asian Games
