= Peter Latham (cyclist) =

New Zealand racing cyclist

Personal information
- Full name: Peter David Latham
- Born: 8 January 1984 (age 42) Te Awamutu, New Zealand

Cycling career
- Sport: Cycling
- Current team: Retired (rider); Whoosh–NZ Cycling Project

Amateur teams
- 2005–2006: Cotes d'Armor Cyclisme
- 2007–2008: Albi Velo Sport

Professional teams
- 2009–2010: Bissell
- 2011–2012: Subway Pro Cycling Team

Managerial team
- 2022–: MitoQ–NZ Cycling Project
Medal record
Representing New Zealand
Men's track cycling
Commonwealth Games
Bronze medal – third place	2006 Melbourne	Team pursuit
World Championships
Bronze medal – third place	2009 Pruszków	Team Pursuit
Bronze medal – third place	2010 Ballerup	Team Pursuit
Men's road cycling
World Championships
Bronze medal – third place	2005 Madrid	Under-23 Time Trial

Peter David Latham (born 8 January 1984) is a New Zealand former professional racing cyclist. He competed in the team pursuit at the 2004 Summer Olympics, where New Zealand finished tenth. In 2005, Latham won the bronze medal in the Under 23 Individual Time Trial at the Road World Championships in Madrid. He competed at the 2006 Commonwealth Games in Melbourne where along with Tim Gudsell, Hayden Godfrey and Marc Ryan he won a bronze medal in the Team pursuit.

== Career ==
In 2005, Latham went to the UCI Road World Championships to compete in the Under-23 category. In the time trial Latham came third 37 seconds behind winner Mikhail Ignatiev. Later in November Latham rode the Lake Taupo Cycle Challenge winning the event in a sprint against Jeremy Yates and Gordon McCauley. After breaking his back in a crash in 2007, Latham came back to represent New Zealand at the 2008 Summer Olympics. At the 2009 UCI Track Cycling World Championships in Poland, Latham along with Marc Ryan, Jesse Sergent, and Westley Gough claimed the bronze medal in the team pursuit. The following year Latham was part of the New Zealand team pursuit that won bronze again at the 2010 UCI Track Cycling World Championships in Denmark.

At the 2011-2012 UCI Track Cycling World Cup Classics, Latham won the Individual Pursuit at the Beijing round. He was the overall World Cup series winner in the Individual Pursuit that season. He finished the season ranked World Number One in the Individual pursuit by the Union Cycliste International.

Latham retired at the end of 2012. He currently works as a Fixed Income trader with the Bank of New Zealand.

== Major results ==
2003
National Under-23 Road Championships

1st Time trial
2nd Road race

2004
National Under-23 Road Championships

1st Time trial
1st Road race

1st Stage 1 (TTT) Tour of Wellington
6th Overall Tour of Southland

1st Stage 5 (ITT)

2005
1st Stage 1 (TTT) Tour of Southland
1st Lake Taupo Cycle Challenge
3rd Overall Tour of Wellington

1st Stages 2, 3 & 6 (ITT)

3rd Under-23 time trial UCI Road World Championships
2006
3rd Chrono Champenois
9th Overall Tour of Wellington
2007
1st Stage 2 Kreiz Breizh Elites
2009
5th Overall Tour of Southland
