= Tour of Siam =

Race details
- Date: January
- Region: Thailand
- Local name(s): ทัวร์ ออฟ สยาม (in Thai)
- Discipline: Road
- Competition: UCI Asia Tour 2.2
- Type: Stage race
- Web site: www.tourofsiam.com/default.asp?lang=en

History
- First edition: 2005
- Editions: 3
- Final edition: 2007
- First winner: Shinichi Fukushima (JPN)
- Final winner: Jai Crawford (AUS)

The Tour of Siam was an annual professional road bicycle racing stage race held in Thailand from 2005 to 2007 as part of the UCI Asia Tour.

== Past winners ==
=== General classification ===
Year	Country	Rider	Team
2005	Japan	Shinichi Fukushima	Bridgestone Anchor
2006	Netherlands	Thomas Rabou	Marco Polo
2007	Australia	Jai Crawford	Giant Asia Racing Team

=== Points classification ===
Year	Country	Rider	Team
2005	Australia	Eddy Hollands	Bridgestone Anchor
2006	Denmark	Dean Iversen	Team Farso
2007	Japan	Takashi Miyazawa	Nippo-Meitan Hompo

=== Mountains classification ===
Year	Country	Rider	Team
2005	Japan	Shinichi Fukushima	Bridgestone Anchor
2006	No race		
2007	Australia	Jai Crawford	Giant Asia Racing Team

=== Asian rider classification ===
Year	Country	Rider	Team
2005	Singapore	Wei Sheng Yang	Singapore (national team)
2006	Indonesia	Robert Wijaya	Polygon Sweet Nice
2007	Indonesia	Iman Suparman	Benteng Muda Tangerang

=== Young rider classification ===
Year	Country	Rider	Team
2005	South Korea	Dong Hun Kim	Seoul City
2006	Indonesia	Robert Wijaya	Polygon Sweet Nice
2007	Australia	Jai Crawford	Giant Asia Racing Team

=== Team classification ===
Year	Team
2005	Marco Polo
2006	Marco Polo
2007	Polygon Sweet Nice
