= Ric Reid =

New Zealand cyclist (born 1969)

Richard Dickson Reid (born 20 November 1969 in Auckland) is a New Zealand road cyclist who competed for New Zealand in the road race events at the 1994 Commonwealth Games and the 1996 Summer Olympics.
