= Cycling at the 2009 SEA Games =

The Cycling Events will be held from 9 December to 14 December 2009 with 8 gold medals up for contention.

== Medal table ==
* Host nation (Laos)

Rank	Nation	Gold	Silver	Bronze	Total
1	Thailand	3	5	2	10
2	Indonesia	3	1	1	5
3	Vietnam	2	1	2	5
4	Malaysia	0	1	2	3
5	Singapore	0	0	1	1
Totals (5 entries)		8	8	8	24

== Medalists ==
=== Road cycling ===
Event	Gold	Silver	Bronze
Men's 50 km individual time trial	Ryan Ariehaan Hilmant; Indonesia	Tonton Sutanto; Indonesia	Mai Công Hiếu; Vietnam
Men's 160.3 Km road race	Bùi Minh Thụy; Vietnam	Mai Nguyễn Hưng; Vietnam	Mohd Zamri Saleh; Malaysia
Women's 25 km individual time trial	Monrudee Chapookam; Thailand	Chanpeng Nontasin; Thailand	Dinah Chan; Singapore
Women's 116.1 Km road race	Jutatip Maneephan; Thailand	Noor Azian Alias; Malaysia	Phạm Thị Thùy Trang; Vietnam

=== Mountain biking ===
Event	Gold	Silver	Bronze
Men's downhill	Popo Ariyo Sejati; Indonesia	Tanaphon Jarupeng; Thailand	Sitichai Ketkaewmanee; Thailand
Men's cross country	Tawatchai Masae; Thailand	Keerati Sukprasart; Thailand	Dadi Nurchanyadi; Indonesia
Women's downhill	Risa Suseanty; Indonesia	Ausanee Pradupyard; Thailand	Vipavee Deekaballes; Thailand
Women's cross country	Nguyễn Thanh Đàm; Vietnam	Hataichanok Srisuwan; Thailand	Masziyaton Mohd Radzi; Malaysia

== Results ==
=== Road Cycling ===
==== Men ====
===== 50 Km. Individual Time Trial =====
December 13
Location : That Luang – Lan Xang Avenue – Samsenethai – Thadeua 10KM-T 4

Rider	NOC	Time Start	Time End	Total Time
Ryan Ariehaan Hilmant	(Indonesia)	10:30:00:00	11:31:58:00	01:01:58:00
Tonton Sutanto	(Indonesia)	10:36:00:00	11:38:08:00	01:02:08:00
Mai Cong Hieu	(Vietnam)	10:46:00:00	11:48:19:00	01:02:19:00
Prajak Mahawong	(Thailand)	10:38:00:00	11:40:53:00	01:02:53:00
Phuchong Sai-Udomsn	(Thailand)	10:32:00:00	11:35:50:00	01:03:50:00
Yong Li Ng	(Malaysia)	10:44:00:00	11:48:45:00	01:04:45:00
Anousay Khochaleune	(Laos)	10:34:00:00	11:40:39:00	01:06:39:00
Jacinto De Jesus Da Costa	(Timor-Leste)	10:40:00:00	12:03:49:00	01:23:49:00
Somphavanh Phommala	(Laos)			DNF

===== 160.3 Km. Massed Start =====
December 14
Location : Done Noune Tri Square, Ban Keun and return at Thalath
Distance : 156.6 km.

Rider	NOC	Time
Bui Minh Thuy	(Vietnam)	04:01:43.00
Mai Nguyen Hung	(Vietnam)	04:02:56.00
Mohd Zamri Saleh	(Malaysia)	04:02:56.00
Ahmad Fallanie	(Malaysia)	04:03:15.00
Natthapon Jeebthaworn	(Thailand)	04:03:24.00
Junaidi Hashim	(Singapore)	04:09:01.00
Nguyen Van Tai	(Vietnam)	04:09:01.00
Ryan Ariehaan Hilmant	(Indonesia)	04:09:01.00
Phuchong Sai-Udomsin	(Thailand)	04:09:02.00
Kaswanto	(Indonesia)	04:09:02.00
Thurakit Boonratanathanakorn	(Thailand)	04:09:03.00
Prajak Mahawong	(Thailand)	04:11:09.00
Mohd Razif Salleh	(Malaysia)	04:11:58.00
Low Ji Wen	(Singapore)	04:11:58.00
Lieo Bouakeo	(Laos)	04:12:13.00
Anuar Manan	(Malaysia)	04:16:52.00
Daniel Loy	(Singapore)	04:16:53.00
Ariya Poonsavath	(Laos)	04:12:13.00
Soulivong Piempanya	(Laos)	04:16:59.00
Le Van Duan	(Vietnam)	04:17:00.00
Samai	(Indonesia)	04:17:00.00
Calvin Sim	(Singapore)	04:17:01.00
Tonton Sutanto	(Indonesia)	DNF
Jesus Da Costa	(Timor-Leste)	DNF
Kengchai Pathoumphanh	(Laos)	DNF

==== Women ====
===== 25 Km. Individual Time Trial =====
December 13
Location : That Luang – Lan Xang Avenue – Samsenethai – Thadeua 10KM-T 4

Rider	NOC	Time Start	Time End	Total Time
Monrudee Chapookam	(Thailand)	09:08:00:00	09:42:28:06	00:34:28:06
Chanpeng Nontasin	(Thailand)	09:20:00:00	09:55:06:84	00:35:06:84
Chan Siew Kheng Dinah	(Singapore)	09:12:00:00	09:47:19:78	00:35:19:78
Nurhayati	(Indonesia)	09:02:00:00	09:37:32:34	00:35:32:34
Santia Tri Kusuma	(Indonesia)	09:14:00:00	09:50:18:87	00:36:18:87
Pham Thi Kim Loan	(Vietnam)	09:18:00:00	09:55:06:59	00:37:06:59
Mariana Mohammad	(Malaysia)	09:04:00:00	09:41:11:05	00:37:11:05
Pham Thi Thuy Lien	(Vietnam)	09:06:00:00	09:43:15:15	00:37:15:15
Nor Azian Alias	(Malaysia)	09:16:00:00	09:53:57:45	00:37:57:45
Vilayvone Phetsalad	(Laos)	09:10:00:00	09:48:26:50	00:38:26:50
Toon Sithaphanh	(Laos)	09:00:00:00	09:38:34:43	00:38:34:43

===== 116.1 Km. Massed Start =====
December 14
Location : Dane Soung, Saythany District
Distance : 120 km.

Rider	NOC	Time
Jutatip Maneephan	(Thailand)	03:36:33.00
Nor Azian Alias	(Malaysia)	03:36:33.00
Pham Thi Thuy Trang	(Vietnam)	03:36:33.00
Monrudee Chapookam	(Thailand)	03:36:34.00
Santia Tri Kusuma	(Indonesia)	03:36:34.00
Pham Thi Kim Loan	(Vietnam)	03:36:34.00
Nurul Ahmar	(Malaysia)	03:36:34.00
Yanthi Fuchianty	(Indonesia)	03:36:34.00
Vo Thi Phuong Phi	(Vietnam)	03:36:36.00
Nguyen Hoang Oanh	(Vietnam)	03:36:36.00
Masziyaton Radzi	(Malaysia)	03:36:36.00
Chanpeng Nontasin	(Thailand)	03:36:36.00
Pham Thi Thuy Lien	(Vietnam)	03:36:36.00
Mariana Mohammad	(Malaysia)	03:36:36.00
Dahlina Rosyda	(Indonesia)	03:36:38.00
Thatsani Wichana	(Thailand)	03:36:38.00
Toon Sithaphanh	(Laos)	03:36:40.00
Nurhayati	(Indonesia)	03:36:43.00
Buala Phengsakoun	(Laos)	03:36:43.00
Vilayvone Phetsalad	(Laos)	03:36:52.00
Maniphone Phimmasene	(Laos)	DNS

=== Mountain biking ===
==== Men ====
===== Down Hill =====
- December 9 - Seeding Run
- December 10 - Final

Location : Dane Soung, Saythany District.

Athlete	NOC	Seeding Run	Final
Popo Ariyo Sejati	(Indonesia)	02:53.15	02:49.45
Tanaphon Jarupeng	(Thailand)	02:53.08	02:50.84
Sitichai Ketkaewmanee	(Thailand)	02:52.64	02:53.92
Agus Suherlan	(Indonesia)	02:56.57	02:54.30
Tan Hong Chun	(Singapore)	03:00.15	02:54.58
Anousay Khochaleune	(Laos)	03:03.65	03:01.64
Jr. Stanly Jalip	(Malaysia)	03:15.56	03:04.59
Ghazali Hakiki Bin Ali Samson	(Malaysia)	03:11.95	03:07.79
Kengchai Pathoumphanh	(Laos)	03:17.43	03:11.12
Ha The Long	(Vietnam)	03:17.00	03:13.58

===== Cross Country =====
December 11
Venue :Tad Song, Saythany District.
Distance : 49.7 km.

Athlete	NOC	Total Time
Tawatchai Masae	(Thailand)	02:21:00.00
Keerati Sukprasart	(Thailand)	02:21:57.00
Peerapol Chawchiangkwang	(Thailand)	02:23:11.00
Dadi Nurchanyadi	(Indonesia)	02:28:33.00
Bandi Sugito	(Indonesia)	02:30:31.00
Chandra Rafsanzani	(Indonesia)	02:32:31.00
Apisit Charoenkit	(Thailand)	02:32:47.00
Chu Quang Thang	(Vietnam)	02:36:28.00
Phung Van Loc	(Vietnam)	
Popo Ariyo Sejati	(Indonesia)	
Shahrin Amir	(Malaysia)	
Kengchai Pathoumphanh	(Laos)	
Jeoffrey Jerry Jemie	(Malaysia)	
Ounheuan Thepvongsa	(Laos)	
Sikko Milakong	(Laos)	
Thanongsak Phimmasenh	(Laos)	
Muhammad Aim Mohamad Fauzi	(Malaysia)	
Norshahriel Haizat Ahmad Nazali	(Malaysia)	

==== Women ====
===== Down Hill =====
- December 9 - Seeding Run
- December 10 - Final

Location : Dane Soung, Saythany District.

Athlete	NOC	Seeding Run	Final
Risa Suseanty	(Indonesia)	03:16.99	03:13.22
Ausanee Pradupyard	(Thailand)	03:22.38	03:16.53
Vipavee Deekaballes	(Thailand)	03:20.50	03:16.76
Bui Thi Quyen	(Vietnam)	03:48.08	03:38.70
Vansy Keoheuangprasurth	(Laos)	04:35.21	03:55.45
Maniphone Phimmasene	(Laos)	DNF	DNS

===== Cross Country =====
December 11
Venue :Tad Song, Saythany District.
Distance : 28.4 km.

Athlete	NOC	Total Time
Nguyen Thanh Dam	(Vietnam)	01:35:15.00
Hataichanok Srisuwan	(Thailand)	01:38:57.00
Masziyaton Mohd Radzi	(Malaysia)	01:40:28.00
Apinya Saisamorn	(Thailand)	01:42:10.00
Vu Thi Thuong	(Vietnam)	01:42:57.00
Junaidah Juss	(Malaysia)	01:43:05.00
Kusmawati Yazid	(Indonesia)	01:45:02.00
Toon Sithaphana	(Laos)	01:47:01.00
Jutamas Wongpadklang	(Thailand)	01:51:03.00
Risa Suseanty	(Indonesia)	01:51:05.00
Ausanee Pradupyard	(Thailand)	01:51:05.00
Vilayvone Phetsalad	(Laos)	
Maniphone Phimmasene	(Laos)	
Vansy Keoheuangprasurth	(Laos)	

Preceded by 2007	Cycling at the SEA Games; 2009 SEA Games	Succeeded by 2011
