= Brandenburg Rundfahrt =

German cycling race

Brandenburg-Rundfahrt
Race details
- Date: September
- Region: Brandenburg, Germany
- English name: Tour of Brandenburg
- Discipline: road
- Competition: National
- Type: Stage race

History
- First edition: 2001
- Editions: 5
- Final edition: 2008
- First winner: Christian Lademann (GER)
- Most wins: Roger Kluge (GER)
- Final winner: Roger Kluge (GER)

The Brandenburg-Rundfahrt was a stage road cycling race that was held in Brandenburg, Germany. The race was on the UCI calendar in category 2.5 from 2001 to 2003. It was not held from 2004 through 2006, but returned for 2007 and 2008 as a national level race.

== Winners ==
Year	Winner	Second	Third
2001	(Germany) Christian Lademann	(Germany) Timo Scholz	(Sweden) Gustav Larsson
2002	(Germany) Timo Scholz	(Germany) Christian Müller	(United States) Mark Fitzgerald
2003	(Switzerland) Jean Nuttli	(Australia) Luke Roberts	(Germany) Martin Müller
2004-2006	No race		
2007	(Germany) Roger Kluge	(Germany) Christian Kux	(Germany) Jörg Lehmann
2008	(Germany) Roger Kluge	(Germany) Marcel Kittel	(Germany) John Degenkolb
