= Jai Crawford =

Australian bicycle racer

Personal information
- Full name: David Jai Crawford
- Born: 4 August 1983 (age 43) Hobart, Australia
- Height: 1.72 m (5 ft 8 in)
- Weight: 59 kg (130 lb; 9.3 st)

Cycling career
- Sport: Cycling
- Current team: Retired
- Discipline: Road
- Role: Rider
- Rider type: Climber

Professional teams
- 2005: Driving Force Logistics
- 2007: Giant Asia Racing Team
- 2008: Trek–Marco Polo
- 2009: Savings & Loans
- 2010: Fly V Australia
- 2011: Giant Kenda Cycling Team
- 2012–2013: Genesys Wealth Advisers
- 2014: Drapac Professional Cycling
- 2015–2018: Kinan Cycling Team

David Jai Crawford (born 4 August 1983) is an Australian former professional road cyclist. He was born in Hobart.

== Major results ==
2007
1st Overall Tour of Siam
2nd Overall Tour de East Java
5th Overall Tour de Langkawi
2008
2nd Overall Tour of Japan
3rd Overall Tour de East Java
8th Overall Tour de Kumano
2009
2nd Overall Tour de Langkawi
2nd Overall Jelajah Malaysia
2nd Overall Tour de Korea
8th Overall Tour of Wellington

1st Stage 3

2010
4th Overall Tour of Utah

1st Stage 5

8th Overall Tour of Wellington
2011
4th Overall Tour de Filipinas
7th Overall Tour de Kumano
9th Overall Tour de Taiwan
2012
2nd Overall Jelajah Malaysia

1st Stage 2

2nd Overall Tour de Singkarak
2013
7th Overall Tour of Borneo
10th Overall Tour de Kumano
2014
7th Overall Tour de Kumano
8th Overall New Zealand Cycle Classic
2015
7th Overall Tour de Singkarak
8th Overall Tour de Kumano
10th Tour de Okinawa
2016
1st Overall Tour de Ijen

1st Stage 4

2nd Tour de Okinawa
4th Overall Tour de Flores

1st Mountains classification

6th Overall Tour de Kumano
7th Overall Tour de Hokkaido
2017
1st Overall Tour de Filipinas
2nd Overall Tour de Tochigi
2nd Overall Tour de Molvccas
4th Overall Tour de Lombok
4th Tour de Okinawa
6th Overall Tour de Ijen
10th Overall Tour de Flores
2018
9th Overall Sharjah Tour
