= Timothy Gudsell =

New Zealand cyclist (born 1984)

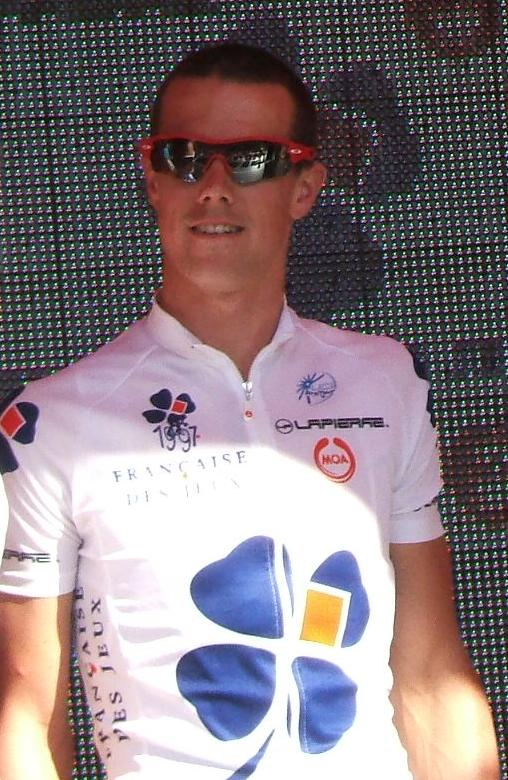

Personal information
- Full name: Timothy Gudsell
- Born: 17 February 1984 (age 42) Feilding, New Zealand
- Height: 187 cm (6 ft 2 in)
- Weight: 77 kg (170 lb)

Cycling career
- Sport: Cycling
- Disciplines: Road and Track
- Role: Rider

Amateur teams
- 2006: Albi Vélo Sport
- 2006: Française des Jeux (Stagiaire)

Professional teams
- 2007–2010: Française des Jeux
- 2011: PureBlack Racing

Timothy Gudsell (born 17 February 1984) is a retired New Zealand track and road racing cyclist who last rode for the PureBlack Racing team. Gudsell turned professional in 2007 and after retiring in 2012 runs a Cycling tour company.

Gudsell was educated at Te Awamutu College in Te Awamutu. While at the college he joined the cycling team racing with Peter Latham where they won the New Zealand Secondary Schools National Cycling Championship Team time trial.

== Career ==
=== Amateur ===
Timothy started his cycling career in 2002 at the Tour of Southland he finished in 17th Overall almost 10 minutes behind winner John Lieswyn. The following year he improved his result to finish 10th overall and also a 3rd Overall in the New Zealand Cycle Classic.

2004 brought about Gudsell's first victory's although they were Team time trial's they were still wins.

On 13 May 2005 New Zealand announced their 'long-list' of participants for the 2006 Commonwealth Games with Gudsell being included in the potential track cyclists. Gudsell competed in the Under-23 events at the 2005 UCI Road World Championships, during the road race Gudsell crashed with 20 kilometres to go eventually finishing in 111th.

On 25 January 2006 it was announced that Gudsell would ride in the 2006 Commonwealth games for New Zealand on the track. At the games Gudsell was part of the Team Pursuit winning the bronze medal with Marc Ryan, Peter Latham & Hayden Godfrey. On 16 July 2006 it was announced Gudsell would join Française des Jeux as a Stagiaire from 1 August with the hopes of stepping up in 2007 to become professional with them. In September after impressing the team as stagiaire Gusell earned a Pro-contract with Française des Jeux for the next two seasons. On 18 October it was announced that New Zealand had earned a spot to enter their National Team in the 2007 Tour Down Under with Gudsell being selected to participate. As part of a training camp for the FDJ team Gudsell performed a Haka for his new teammates.

=== FDJ (2007 to 2010) ===
Now a professional, Gudsell started the 2007 season with the National Road Race Championships where he finished fourth 30 seconds behind winner Julian Dean. Then he went to the Tour Down Under with the New Zealand National team where he finished in 80th position. As part of the New Zealand track team he was expected to race the World championships however he came down with a case of the flu. His first major race of the season was a Cycling monument the 2007 Paris–Roubaix where he worked as a domestique for Philippe Gilbert who finished in 52nd. Gudsell began his first Grand Tour in May the 2007 Giro d'Italia. Sadly during Stage 7 he crashed out of the race ending up in hospital with a deep cut in his left thigh. Gudsell didn't race again until the end of August in the Tour Poitou-Charentes en Nouvelle-Aquitaine. Because of his injury he missed selection for the UCI Road World Championships. Gudsell finished the season with an 8th Overall in the Tour of Southland.

2008 started out once again with the National championships with Gudsell finishing in 8th once again behind Julian Dean. Then Across the ditch to Australia for the 2008 Tour Down Under where this timeriding for Française des Jeux he rode in support of Mickaël Delage who finished in fourth. Following the same as last year he rode Paris–Roubaix followed by the Tour de Romandie and the Giro d'Italia which he this time completed, finishing in 136th. Gudsell was named as part of the team riding in the 2008 Summer Olympics Road race; he did not finish the race.

For his third year at Française des Jeux Gudsell began his season at the National champs finishing in 16th behind winner Gordon McCauley and hi dominant Subway–Avanti Cycling Team team. Then across to Aussie once again for the 2009 Tour Down Under after finishing 8th in stage 1, he crashed on stage 3 and had to abandon. He ended up with a collarbone broken in 4 places and was out from racing till Gent–Wevelgem in April. In the hopes of the end of his crash marred season Gudsell was called up as a last minute selection for the Vuelta a España being given a free role to show the managers what he can do.

Gudsell was selected to lead Française des Jeux at the 2010 Tour Down Under but did not end up participating. He had another major crash this year in the Tour de Pologne and after a year of bumps and breaks his team chose not to renew his contract.

=== PureBlack Racing (2011) ===
The 2011 season started with Gudsell being announced as the leader of PureBlack Racing. With a team now built around him Gudsell achieved good results, 8th in the Tour of Wellington, 9th in Herald Sun Tour and 3rd in the Tour of Southland with a stage win on stage 6.

== Post Cycling ==
After his 2011 team folded unexpectedly Gudsell had to find something to do other than racing, he started a cycling tour and coaching business called Ventouro. Gudsell still runs the business to today.

== Major results ==
2003
3rd Overall New Zealand Cycle Classic
10th Overall Tour of Southland
2004
1st Stage 1 TTT New Zealand Cycle Classic
1st Stage 1 TTT Tour of Southland
2005
1st Stage 1 TTT Tour of Southland
1st Team Pursuit Manchester Track World Cup (Note: Teammates were Jason Allen, Hayden Godfrey and Marc Ryan.)
2006
1st Overall Tour du Haut-Anjou

1st Stage 2

2nd Overall New Zealand Cycle Classic

1st Stage 1

3rd (bronze) Commonwealth Games, Team Pursuit (with Marc Ryan, Peter Latham & Hayden Godfrey)
9th Châteauroux Classic
2007
8th Overall Tour of Southland
2011
1st Tour of Somerville
3rd Overall Tour of Southland

1st Stage 6

8th Overall Tour of Wellington
9th Overall Herald Sun Tour

=== Grand Tour general classification results timeline ===
Grand Tour	2007	2008	2009
Giro d'Italia	DNF	136	—
Tour de France	—	—	—
Vuelta a España	—	—	136

Legend
—	Did not compete
DNF	Did not finish

== Gallery ==
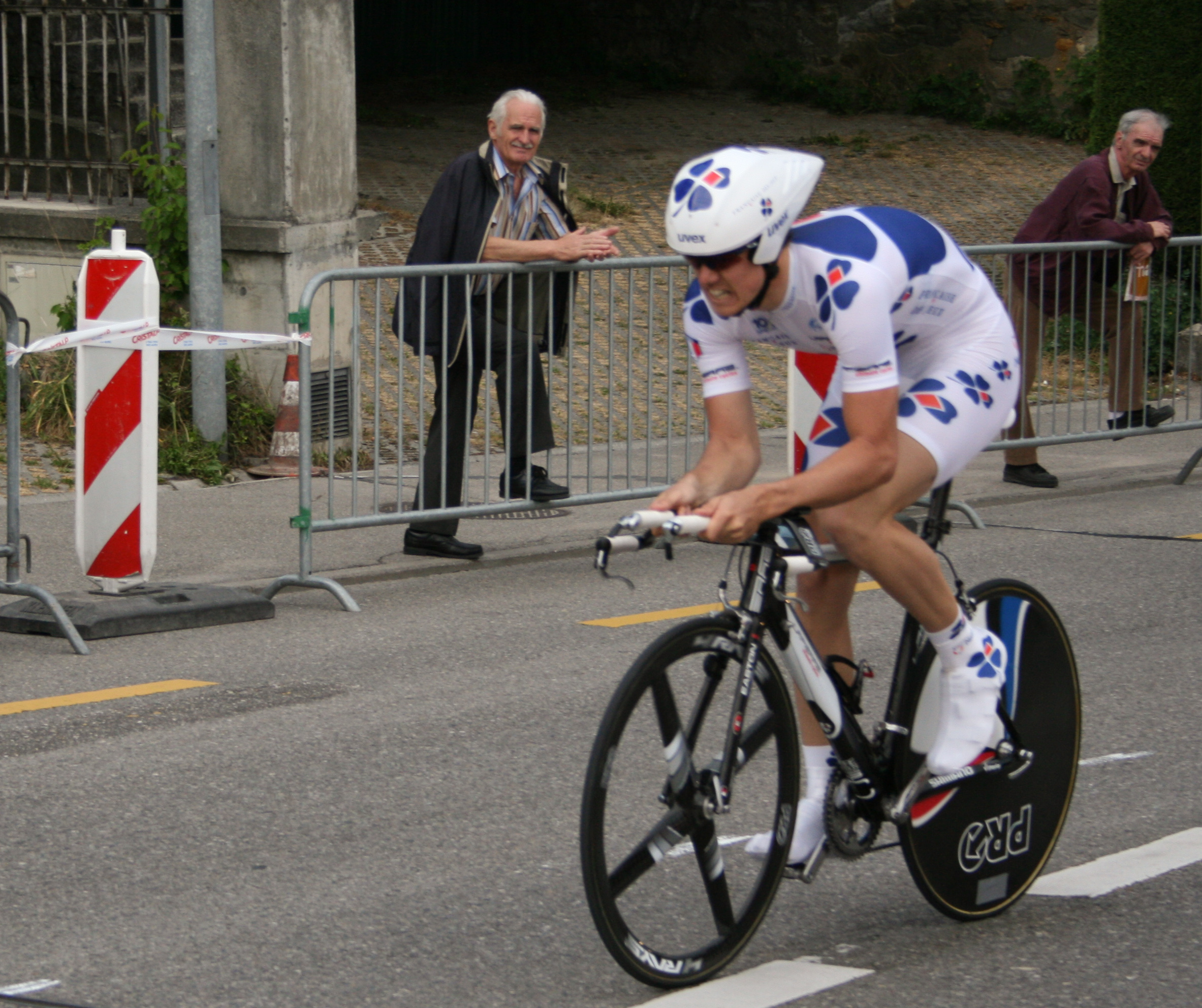
Gudsell at the 2007 Tour de Romandie prologue

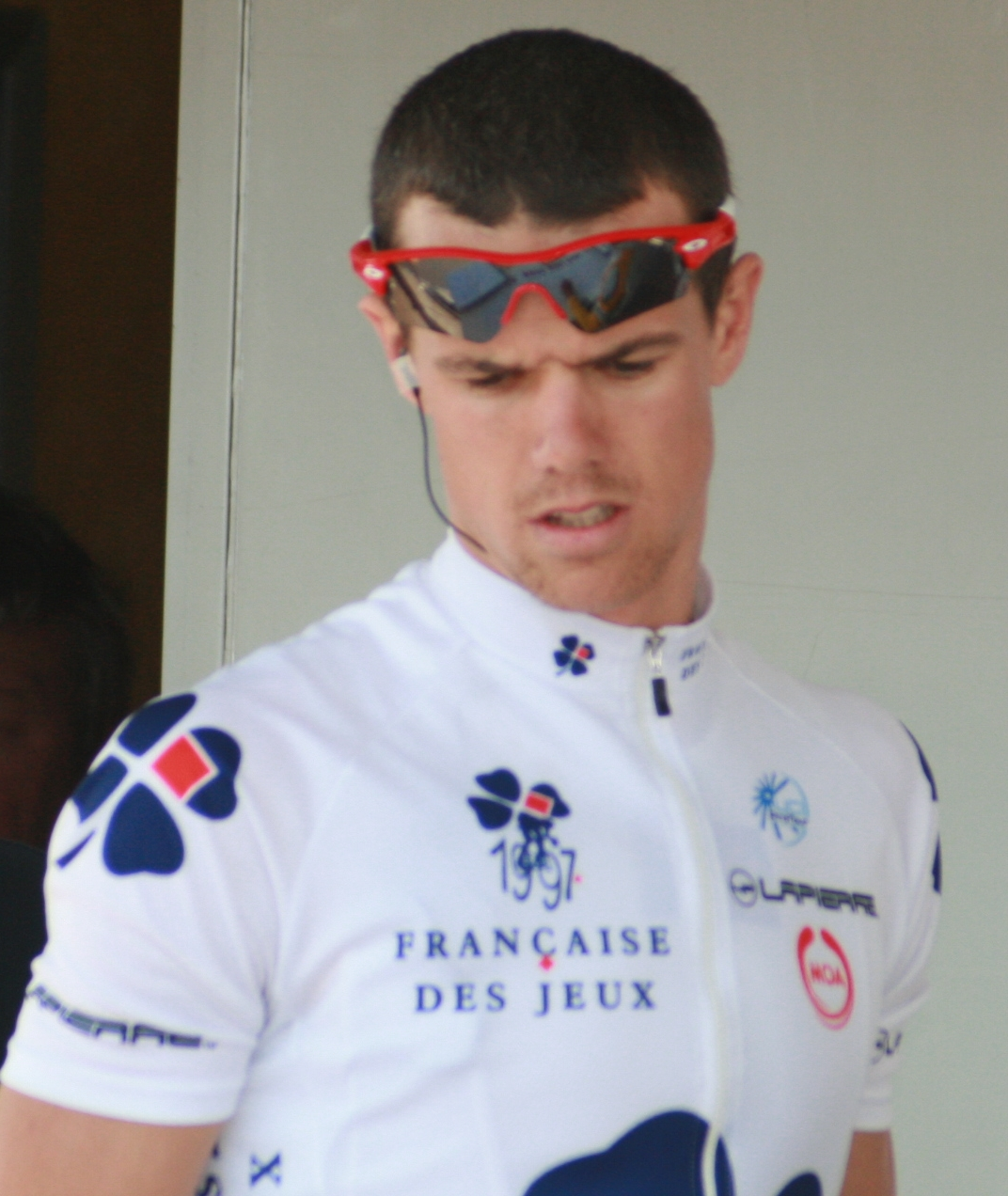
Gudsell in 2008

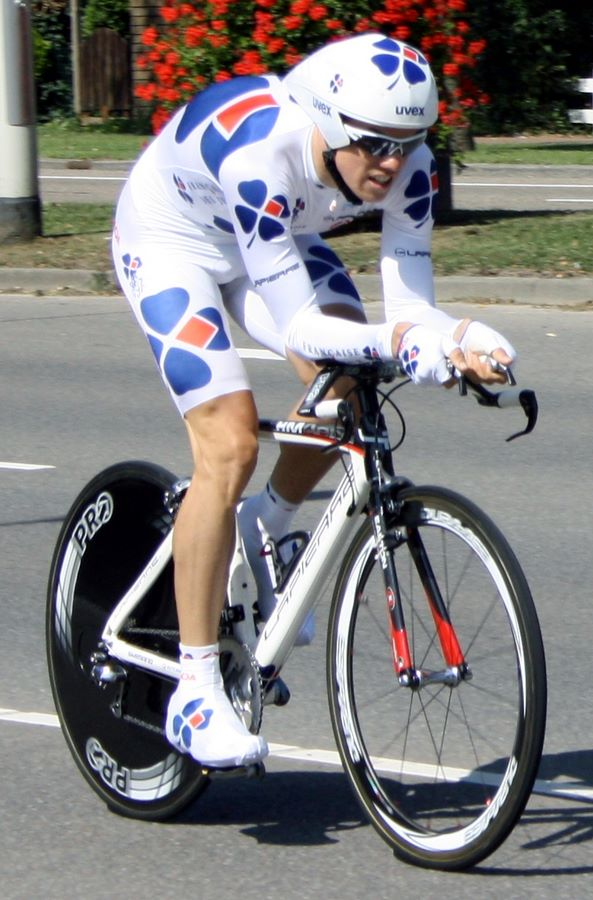
Gudsell at the 2009 Eneco tour prologue
