= Mohd Zamri Saleh =

Malaysian cyclist

Zamri Saleh
Personal information
- Full name: Mohamed Zamri Saleh
- Born: 10 December 1983 (age 42)

Cycling career
- Sport: Cycling

Professional teams
- 2008–2010: MNCF Cycling Team
- 2011–2022: Terengganu Cycling Team

Major wins
- One-day races and Classics National Road Race Championships (2012,2015)
Medal record
Men's Road bicycle race
Representing Malaysia
Southeast Asian Games
Bronze medal – third place	2009 Vientiane	Road race
Bronze medal – third place	2017 Kuala Lumpur	Criterium

Mohamed Zamri Saleh (born 10 December 1983) is a Malaysian former professional racing cyclist, who last ride for UCI Continental team Terengganu Cycling Team. He is the eldest brother of Harrif Saleh.

After retiring from professional cycling in 2022, he opens a cafe shop in Terengganu. He also were the sports director of Terengganu Cycling Team since 2023.

== Major results ==
2007
1st Stage 4 Perlis Open
2009
3rd Road race, Southeast Asian Games
2010
6th Overall Melaka Governor's Cup
2011
1st Stage 3 Tour de Bintan
2nd Road race, National Road Championships
2012
1st Road race, National Road Championships
1st Stage 2 King's Cup 2
1st Stage 7 Tour de Singkarak
1st Stage 4 Tour de East Java
1st Stage 5 Tour de Brunei
4th Road race, Asian Cycling Championships
2013
Tour de Singkarak

1st Points classification
1st Stage 6

1st Mountains classification Jelajah Malaysia
4th Road race, National Road Championships
8th Road race, Asian Cycling Championships
2014
Jelajah Malaysia

1st Stages 2 & 3

2015
3rd Road race, National Road Championships
2016
1st Road race, National Road Championships
2nd Tour de Jakarta
10th UAE Cup
2017
1st Stage 5 Tour de Selangor
3rd Criterium, Southeast Asian Games
