= Timo Scholz =

German cyclist

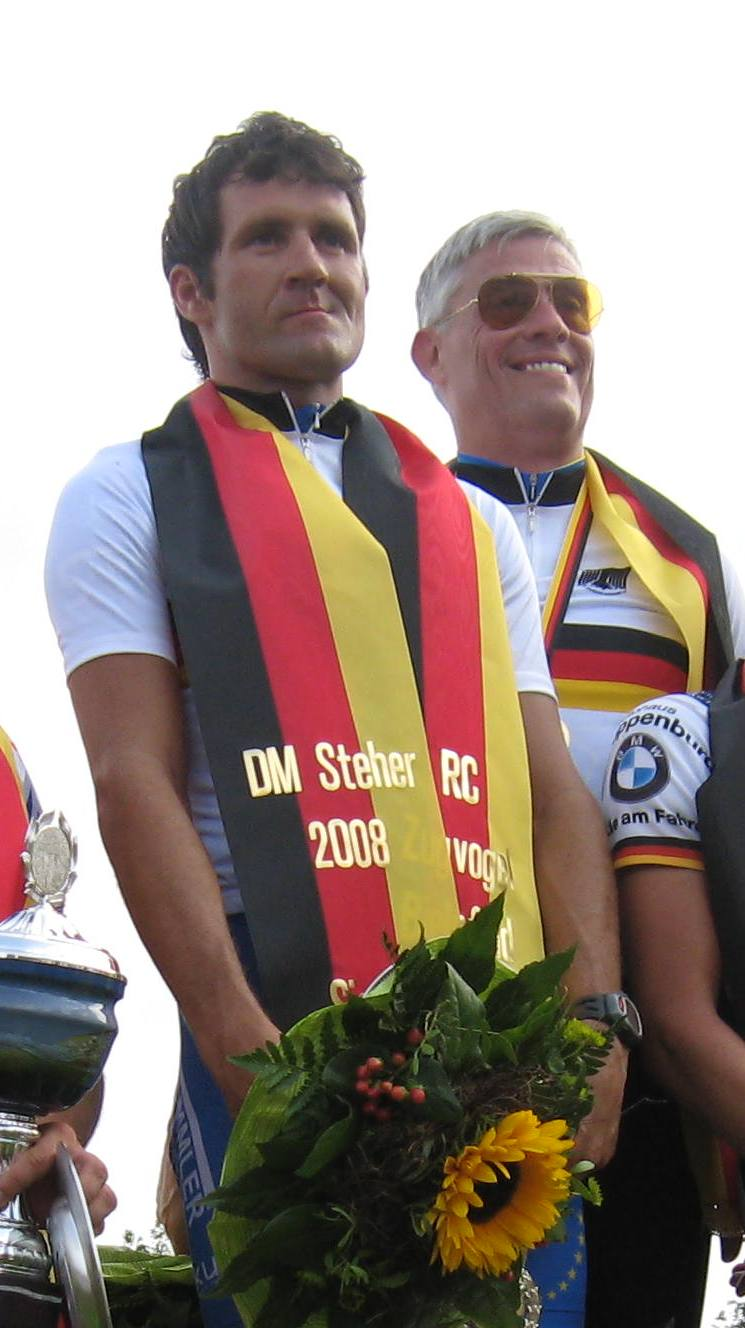

Personal information
- Born: 30 June 1972 (age 54) Leipzig, Germany

Cycling career
- Sport: Cycling
- Current team: Retired
- Disciplines: Road, track
- Role: Rider

Amateur team
- 2000: Bunte Berte Leipzig

Professional teams
- 1998–1999: Die Continentale–Olympia
- 2001–2003: Wiesenhof–Leipzig
- 2004–2005: Winfix–Arnolds Sicherheit
- 2006–2007: Notebooksbilliger.de
- 2012: CCN

Timo Scholz (born 30 June 1972 in Leipzig) is a German former cyclist.

== Major results ==
=== Road ===
1995
1st Overall Bayern Rundfahrt
2nd Overall Sachsen Tour
3rd Overall Thüringen Rundfahrt der U23
1997
1st Overall Thüringen Rundfahrt der U23
1999
1st Rund um Sebnitz
3rd Rund um die Nürnberger Altstadt
2000
1st Stage 3 Vuelta a Costa Rica
2001
2nd Overall Flèche du Sud
2nd Overall Brandenburg-Rundfahrt
4th Overall Sachsen Tour
2002
1st Overall Brandenburg-Rundfahrt

1st Stage 1

1st Stage 8 Vuelta a Cuba
10th Overall Sachsen Tour
2003
9th GP Triberg-Schwarzwald
2004
7th Overall Herald Sun Tour
2007
1st Stage 1B Tour du Maroc
2008
2nd Tobago Cycling Classic
2009
3rd Tobago Cycling Classic
10th Overall Tour of Thailand
2012
3rd Overall Tour de Ijen

1st Points classification

4th Overall Le Tour de Filipinas
7th Overall Tour of Vietnam
10th Overall Tour de Borneo

=== Track ===
1997
1st National Team Pursuit Championships (with Holger Roth, Jens Lehmann and Thomas Liese)
2006
3rd European Middle Distance Championships
2007
1st European Middle Distance Championships
2008
1st European Middle Distance Championships
1st National Middle Distance Championships
2009
1st National Derny Championships
2011
1st National Derny Championships
