= Vladimir Zagorodniy =

Ukrainian cyclist (born 1981)

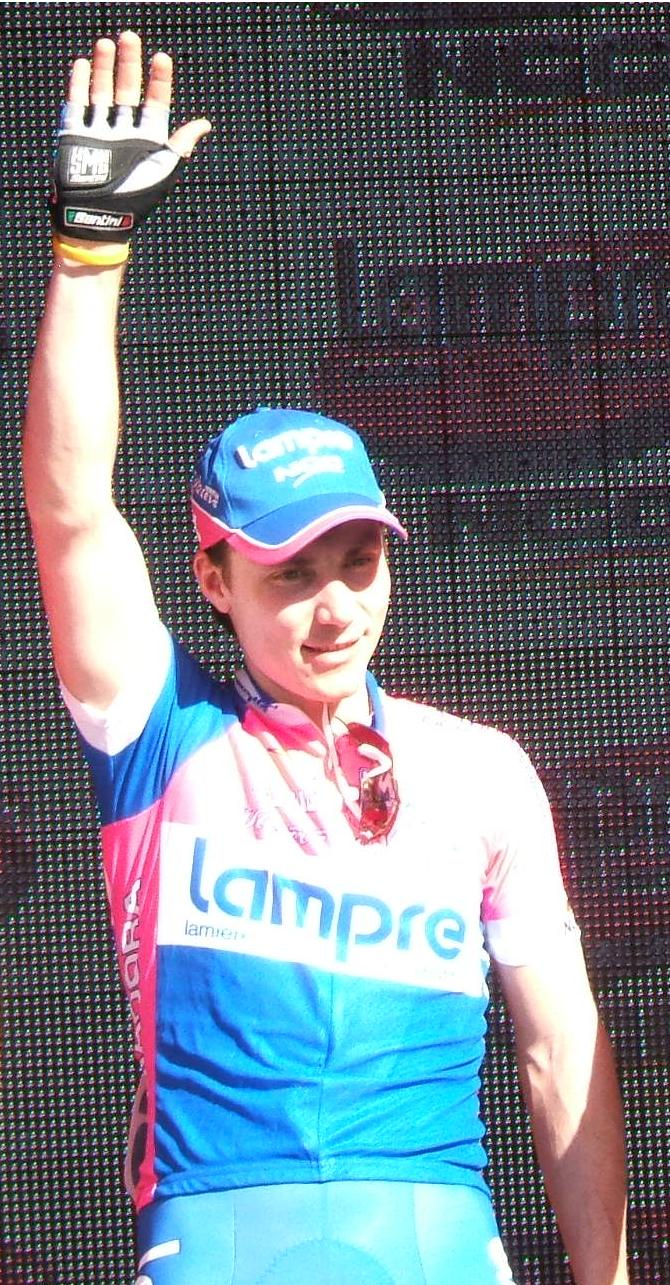

Personal information
- Full name: Vladimir Anatolyevich Zagorodniy
- Born: 27 June 1981 (age 45) Simferopol, Crimean Oblast, Ukrainian SSR, Soviet Union
- Height: 1.73 m (5 ft 8 in)
- Weight: 64 kg (141 lb)

Cycling career
- Sport: Cycling
- Discipline: Road
- Role: Rider

Amateur teams
- 2005: Domina Vacanze (stagiaire)
- 2006: S. C. Pagnoncelli-NGC-Perrel

Professional teams
- 2007–2008: OTC Doors–Lauretana
- 2009: Lampre–NGC
- 2010–2011: Miche
- 2012: Uzbekistan Suren Team
- 2013–2014: Kolss Cycling Team
- 2015: RTS–Santic Racing Team

Vladimir Anatolyevich Zagorodniy (Russian: Владимир Анатольевич Загородний; Ukrainian: Володимир Анатолійович Загородній, romanized: Volodymyr Anatoliovych Zahorodniy; born 27 June 1981) is a Ukrainian (until 2014) and Russian (since 2015) road bicycle racer. He was professional from 2007 to 2015.

== Major results ==
2005
3rd Giro della Valsesia 2
8th Cronoscalata Internazionale Gardone
2006
1st Road race, National Road Championships
1st Overall Giro della Provincia di Cosenza

1st Stage 2

2007
1st Road race, National Road Championships
3rd Trofeo Melinda
3rd Coppa Placci
7th Trofeo Matteotti
2008
1st Stage 5 Tour of Qinghai Lake
1st Stage 1 (ITT) Giro del Trentino
3rd Road race, National Road Championships
3rd GP Industria & Commercio di Prato
2009
4th Road race, National Road Championships
10th Overall Tour of Hainan
2012
1st Stage 5 Tour of Borneo
10th Overall Jelajah Malaysia
2013
3rd Road race, National Road Championships
8th Overall Tour of Romania

1st Prologue (TTT)

9th Overall Tour of Hainan
2014
7th Race Horizon Park 1
