= Ji Jianhua =

Chinese cyclist

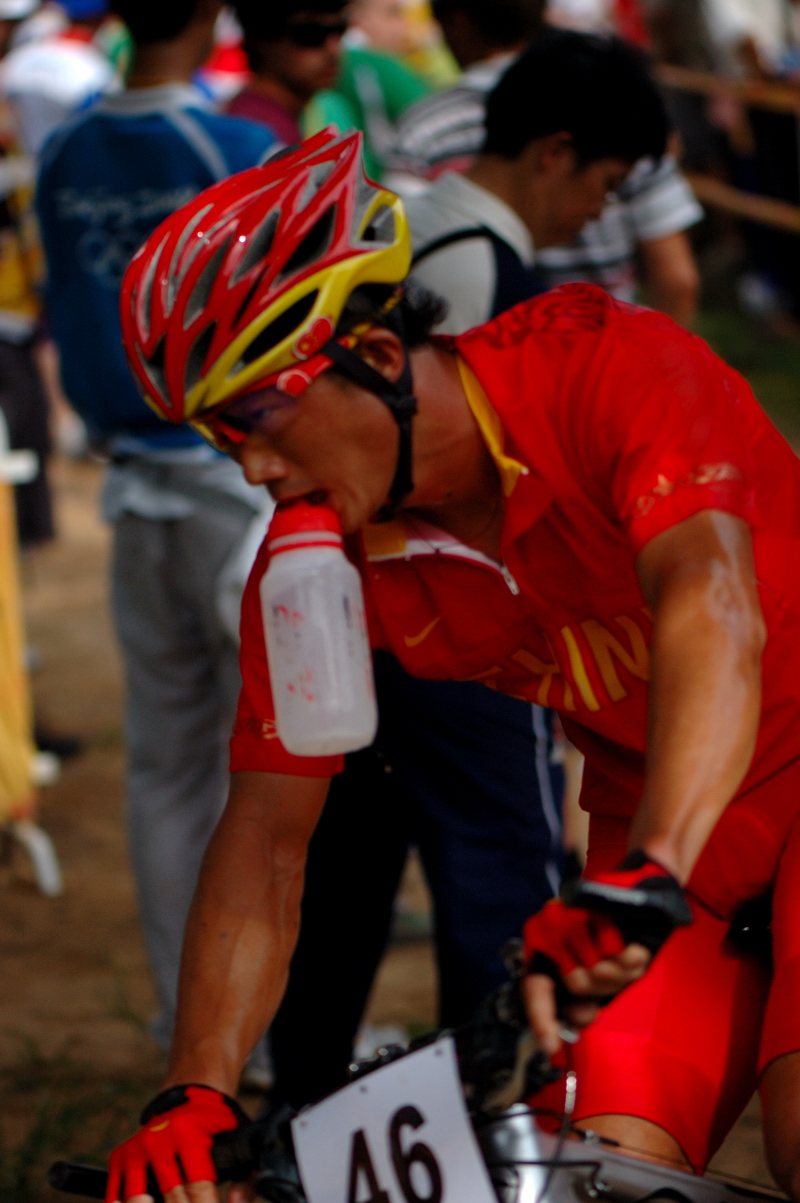
Ji Jianhua in 2008

Ji Jianhua (Chinese: 姬建华; born January 29, 1982, in Xinjiang) is a male Chinese Olympic cyclist, who has competed for Team China at the 2008 Summer Olympics.

== Sports career ==
- 2000 Xinjiang Kuerle Athletics Team
- 2002 Anhui Provincial Cycling Team
- 2007 National Team
- 2008 Skil–Shimano

== Major performances ==
- 2004 Mountain Bike National Championships – 1st
- 2005 National Games – 3rd mountain bike
- 2007 National Championships/Asian Championships – 1st mountain bike
