= Nathan Earle (cyclist) =

Australian cyclist (born 1988)

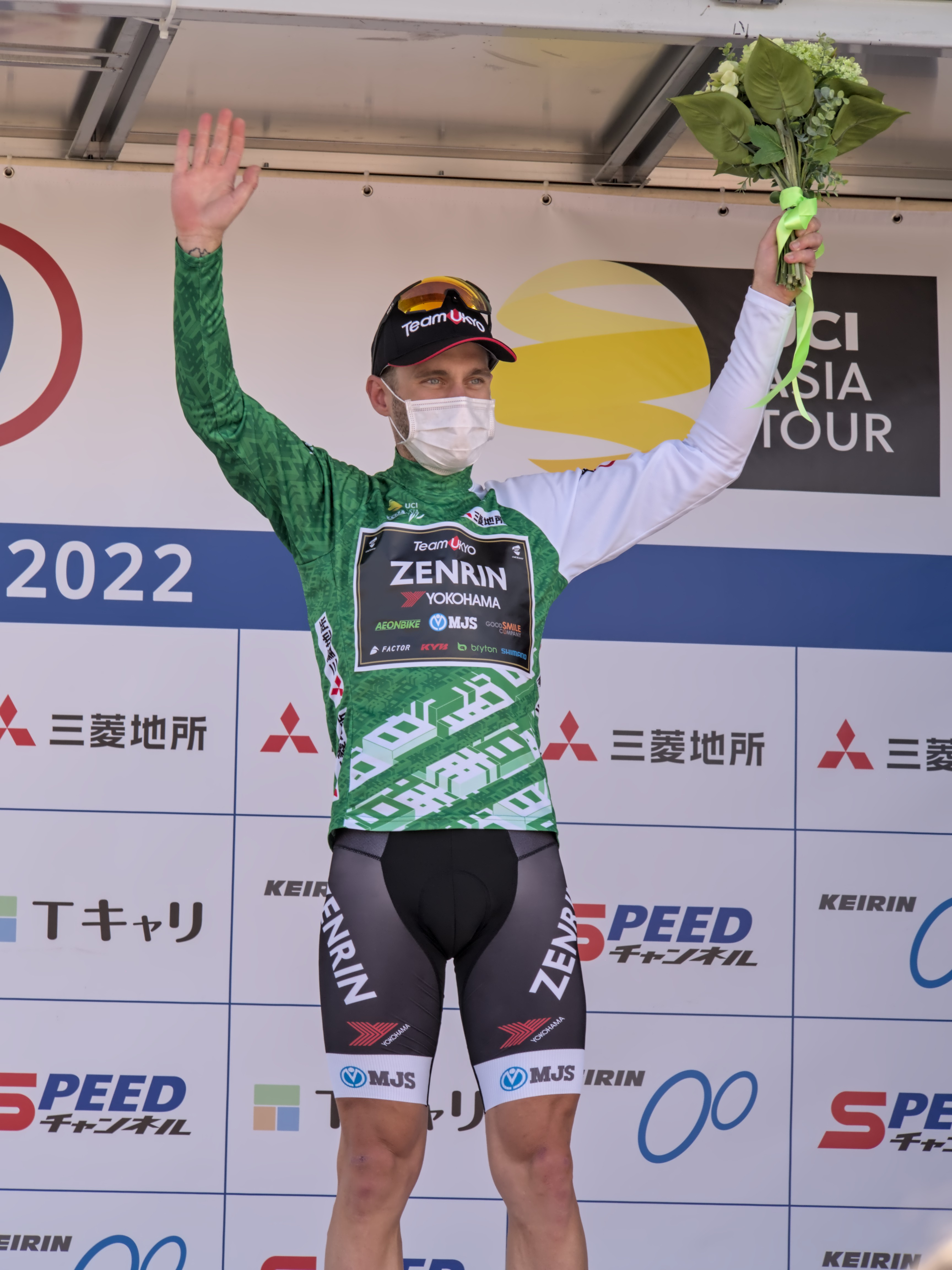
- Earle in 2022.

Personal information
- Full name: Nathan Earle
- Born: 4 June 1988 (age 38) Tasmania, Australia
- Height: 1.80 m (5 ft 11 in)
- Weight: 70 kg (150 lb)

Cycling career
- Sport: Cycling
- Current team: Kinan Racing Team
- Discipline: Road
- Role: Rider

Professional teams
- 2008–2013: Praties
- 2014–2015: Team Sky
- 2016: Drapac Professional Cycling
- 2017: Team UKYO
- 2018–2019: Israel Cycling Academy
- 2020–2024: Team UKYO
- 2025: Kinan Racing Team

Nathan Earle (born 4 June 1988) is an Australian cyclist, who currently rides for UCI Continental team Kinan Racing Team.

== Career ==
Earle rode for Team Sky in 2014 and 2015. He transferred to the Australian team Drapac Professional Cycling for the 2016 season. Subsequently, he made a move to the Japanese Team UKYO for the 2017 season. In October 2017, the Israel Cycling Academy team announced Earle's signing, securing him on a two-year deal starting from 2018. His primary role within the team was to serve as a domestique for riders Ben Hermans and Rubén Plaza.

He reunited with Team UKYO for the 2020 season.

Notably, Earle achieved the third fastest 'Everesting' time, a feat he accomplished in October 2020.

== Major results ==
2010
10th Overall Tour of Wellington
2011
5th Overall Tour of Wellington

1st Stages 2, 3 & 4

7th Coppa della Pace – Trofeo F.lli Anelli
9th Trofeo Alcide Degasperi
2012
1st Stage 3 Mersey Valley Tour
2nd Overall Tour de Borneo

1st Mountains classification
1st Stages 2 & 4

2013
1st Overall New Zealand Cycle Classic

1st Stages 2 & 4

1st Overall Tour of Toowoomba

1st Stages 2 & 3 (TTT)

1st Overall Santos North West Tour

1st Stage 4

1st Stage 3 Tour de Perth
3rd Overall Tour de Kumano
5th Overall Tour de Taiwan

1st Stage 2

5th Overall Tour de Borneo
9th Overall Tour of Japan

1st Stage 5

2016
10th Overall Tour de Taiwan
2017
1st Overall Tour de Lombok

1st Mountains classification
1st Sprints classification
1st Stages 1 & 2

1st Mountains classification Tour of Thailand
2nd Overall Tour of Japan
5th Road race, National Road Championships
8th Overall Herald Sun Tour
10th Overall Tour de Filipinas
2018
6th Overall Vuelta a Asturias
2019
4th Overall Tour de Taiwan
2022
1st Overall Tour of Japan

1st Stage 1

1st Overall Tour de Kumano
Tour of Thailand

1st Mountains classification
1st Stage 6

2023
1st Overall Tour of Japan

1st Stage 6

4th Mine Akiyoshi-dai Karst International Road Race
2024
8th Oita Urban Classic
2025
2nd Oita Urban Classic
