= Bambang Suryadi =

Indonesian politician (1968–2021)

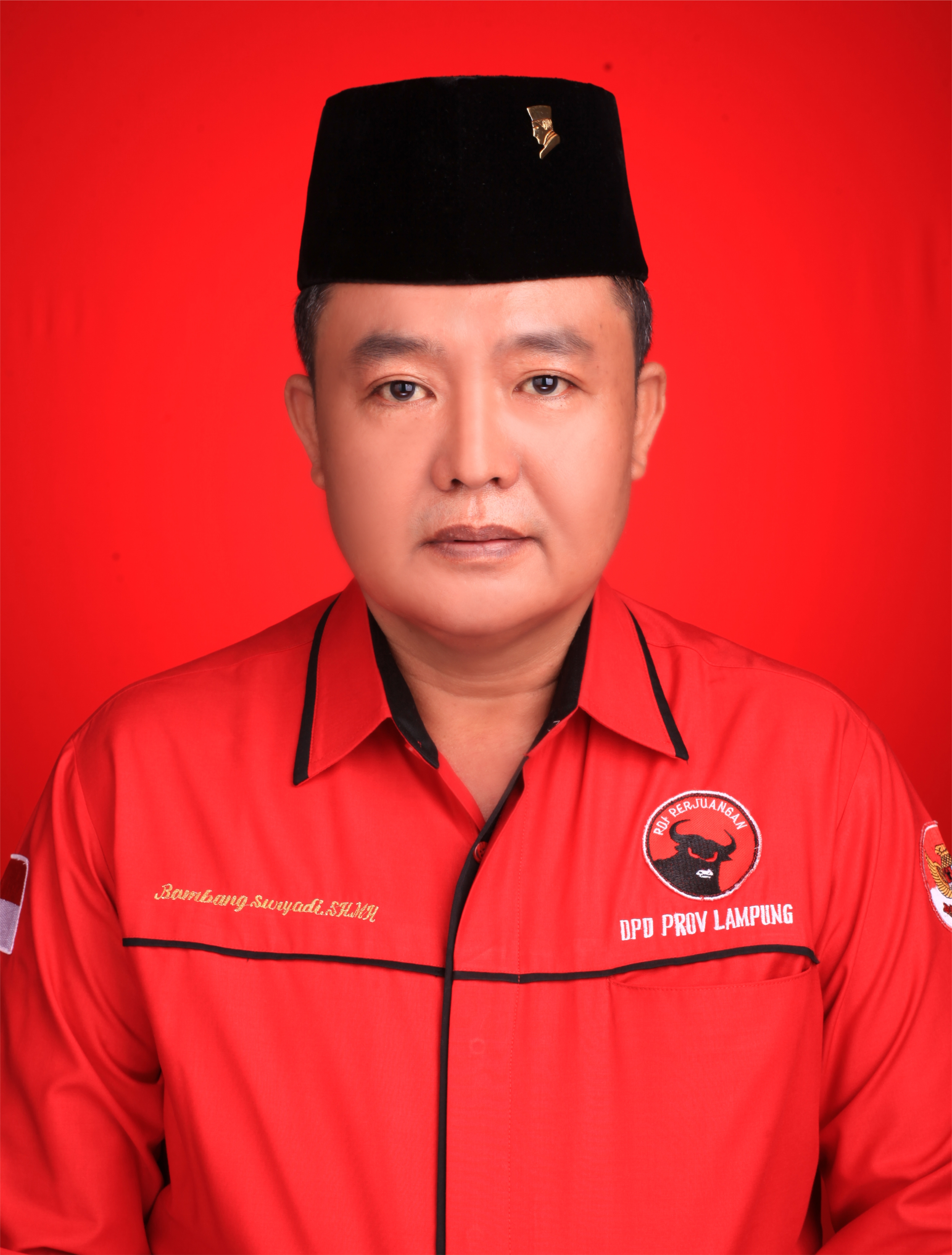

Member of the People's Representative Council
- In office 1 October 2019 – 4 January 2021
- Constituency: Lampung II (Lampung Timur, Lampung Tengah, Lampung Utara, Way Kanan, Tulangbawang, Mesuji, Tulang Bawang Barat)

Member of Lampung Regional People's Representative Council
- In office 1 September 2014 – 2 September 2019
- Constituency: Lampung 7

Member of Central Lampung Regional People's Representative Council
- In office 2004–2014

Personal details
- Born: 1 October 1968 Blitar, East Java, Indonesia
- Died: 4 January 2021 (aged 52) Jakarta, Indonesia
- Cause of death: COVID-19
- Party: Indonesian Democratic Party of Struggle
- Education: Tulang Bawang University (S.H.); Lampung University (M.H.)

Bambang Suryadi, also known by his nickname Basur (1 October 1968 – 4 January 2021) was an Indonesian politician from the Indonesian Democratic Party of Struggle who served as a member of the Central Lampung Regional People's Representative Council from 2004 until 2014, Member of the Lampung Regional People's Representative Council from 2014 until 2019, and Member of the People's Representative Council from 2019 until his death.

== Early life and education ==
Bambang Suryadi was born on 1 October 1968, in Blitar, East Java. Bambang began his education at the Sumberdiren Garun State Elementary School in 1975 and finished in 1981. He continued his studies at the State Catholic Junior High School Number 1 in Blitar from 1981 until 1984 and at the Taman Siswa High School in Blitar from 1984 until 1987.

In 2008, whilst still serving in the Central Lampung Regional People's Representative Council, Bambang enrolled at the Law Faculty of the Tulang Bawang University and graduated with a law degree (S.H.) three years later. In the same year after he graduated from the university, he enrolled at the Lampung University to pursue a law magister and graduated in 2015.

In 2018, Bambang enrolled at the Lampung University to pursue a doctorate degree in law. He became a doctoral candidate after finishing a prerequisite test on 23 September 2019. However, his death in January 2021 prevented him from graduating with a doctorate degree. Bambang stated in a 2019 interview that he would have obtained his doctorate degree in March 2021, a year and a half after the prerequisite test.

== Political career ==
=== In the Indonesian Democratic Party of Struggle ===
Bambang joined the party in 1999 when he became the chairman of the party's branch in Bandar Jaya district until 2002. In the same year, he was appointed the secretary of the Central Lampung branch of the party. He became the chairman of the Central Lampung branch of the party for two terms, from 2005 until 2010 and from 2010 until 2015.

=== Parliamentary career ===
Bambang began his career in lawmaking when he was elected to the Central Lampung Regional People's Representative Council in the 2004 Indonesian legislative election. He was subsequently elected for a second term in the next election. After his second term ended, Bambang ran as a candidate for the Lampung Regional People's Representative Council from the Lampung 7 electoral district in the 2014 Indonesian legislative election. He obtained 31,414 in the election; the most of any candidate in the district. He ended his term in the council five years later on 2 September 2019.

Bambang ran again as a candidate for the People's Representative Council from the Lampung II electoral district, which covers Lampung Timur, Lampung Tengah, Lampung Utara, Way Kanan, Tulangbawang, Mesuji, and Tulang Bawang Barat. He obtained 86,875 votes in the election and won a seat for the council. Bambang was seated in the Commission V of the council, which handles infrastructure, transportation, disadvantaged areas, transmigration, meteorology, climatology, geophysics, and search and rescue.

== Personal life ==
Bambang was married to Dahlia Afriani. The couple has five children.

=== Death ===
Bambang died from COVID-19 at 03.40 in Fatmawati Hospital, Jakarta, on 4 January 2021, during the COVID-19 pandemic in Indonesia.

He was buried in Nambahdadi Village, Central Lampung, at 15.30. His funeral procession was attended by 50 people, including the Regent of Central Lampung Loekman Djoyosoemarto, in compliance with COVID-19 prevention guidelines. When his body was about to be buried, mourners sang the hymn of the Indonesian Democratic Party of Struggle. After his body was lowered to the ground, gravediggers put the flag of the Indonesian Democratic Party of Struggle, and Bambang was buried with the flag above him.
