= PureBlack Racing =

New Zealand road cycling team

Team information
- Registered: New Zealand
- Founded: 2010
- Disbanded: 2012
- Discipline: Road
- Status: UCI Continental

Team name history
- 2010–2012: PureBlack Racing

PureBlack Racing was launched in July 2010, aiming to become New Zealand's first international UCI ProTour road cycling team. Olympians, professional athletes, business figures, politicians and government agencies from around the country showed strong support for the venture by attending the launch in Auckland.

Led by America's Cup yachtsman, Star Class World Champion and Olympian, Carl Williams, PureBlack Racing competed in UCI’s US Continental Tour in 2011 with the ultimate aim of becoming a ProTour Team with entry to the Tour de France by 2015. In December 2011, PureBlack Racing announced the team's proposed race program was in jeopardy due to lack of funding, and they were seeking further sponsorship.

Team PureBlack Racing grew out of Team Bici Vida, a domestic high performance cycling team, which Williams launched on his return from Valencia. From day one Williams’ vision was to build a world-class international cycle team in New Zealand, establishing it as a fully professional sports organisation.

== Pro Roster ==
As at 1 January 2011

Rider	Date of birth
Daniel Barry (NZL)	29 January 1988 (aged 22)
Glen Chadwick (NZL)	17 October 1976 (aged 34)
Louis Crosby (NZL)	31 December 1989 (aged 21)
Timothy Gudsell (NZL)	17 February 1984 (aged 26)
Taylor Gunman (NZL)	14 March 1991 (aged 19)
Marc Langlands (NZL)	9 June 1987 (aged 23)
Scott Lyttle (NZL)	8 February 1984 (aged 26)

Rider	Date of birth
James McCoy (NZL)	14 June 1990 (aged 20)
Mike Northey (NZL)	24 March 1987 (aged 23)
Shem Rodger (NZL)	4 December 1988 (aged 22)
Michael Torckler (NZL)	12 April 1987 (aged 23)
Roman van Uden (NZL)	29 October 1988 (aged 22)
James Williamson (NZL)	27 March 1989 (aged 21)

== Development Roster ==
Rider	Date of birth
Scott Creighton (NZL)	2 May 1993 (aged 17)
Fraser Gough (NZL)	9 February 1993 (aged 17)
Nicholas Hand (NZL)	Unknown
James Northey (NZL)	Unknown

Rider	Date of birth
James Oram (NZL)	17 June 1993 (aged 17)
Alexander Ray (NZL)	3 October 1990 (aged 20)
Dion Smith (NZL)	3 March 1993 (aged 17)
Nick Sutton (NZL)	Unknown

== Major wins ==
2011
Points classification Tour of Utah, Roman van Uden
