= Lex Nederlof =

Dutch cyclist

Personal information
- Full name: Leendert Arie Nederlof
- Nickname: Lex
- Born: 10 June 1966 (age 60) Oostvoorne, Netherlands

Cycling career
- Sport: Cycling
- Discipline: Road
- Role: Rider

Professional teams
- 1988: Superconfex–Yoko–Opel–Colnago (stagiaire)
- 2005: Fondas Imabo–Doorisol
- 2012–2018: CCN

Leendert Arie Nederlof (born 10 June 1966 in Oostvoorne) is a retired Dutch cyclist. He was the oldest active professional cyclist until his retirement in 2018.

== Major results ==
1993
1st Flèche du Sud
2001
3rd Dorpenomloop Rucphen
2006
2nd Overall Tour of Hong Kong Shanghai
2007
7th Tour of Siam
2013
1st Melaka Governor's Cup
10th Overall Jelajah Malaysia
