= Nex CCN Cycling Team =

Laotian cycling team

Team information
- UCI code: CCN
- Registered: Brunei (2012–2014); Laos (2015– )
- Founded: 2012
- Discipline: Road
- Status: UCI Continental

Team name history
- 2012–2015 2016 2017 2018–: CCN Cycling Team; Black Inc Cycling Team; CCN Cycling Team; Nex CCN Cycling Team

Nex CCN Cycling Team is a UCI Continental cycling team established in 2012 based in Laos.

== Team roster ==
Rider	Date of birth
Ryan Ariehaan (IDN)	4 March 1979 (age 47)
Dodo Choumaly (LAO)	5 April 1997 (age 29)
Konstantin Fast (RUS)	28 August 1976 (age 50)
Hari Fitrianto (IDN)	12 May 1985 (age 41)
Logan Griffin (NZL)	19 May 1995 (age 31)
Changpad Kritsada (THA)	5 April 1991 (age 35)

Rider	Date of birth
Lex Nederlof (NED)	10 June 1966 (age 60)
Stephen Ong (Malaysia)	9 June 1975 (age 51)
Thavone Phonasa (LAO)	12 January 1994 (age 32)
Soutisack Vandila (LAO)	8 August 1996 (age 30)
Phyuth Yoeun (CAM)	5 March 1996 (age 30)

== Major wins ==
2012
Stage 4 Tour of Singkarak, John Ebsen
2013
Asian Cycling Time Trial Championships, Muradian Halmuratov
Asian Cycling Road Race Championships, Muradian Halmuratov
Stage 6 The Maha Chackri Sirindhon's Cup Tour of Thailand, Ki Seok Lee
Stage 1 Le Tour de Filipinas, Ki Seok Lee
Melaka Governor's Cup, Lex Nederlof
2014
Stage 4 Le Tour de Filipinas, Ariya Phounsavath
Prologue Tour of Al Zubarah, Roman Van Uden
2015
Stage 2 Tour de Borneo, Jos Koop
2017
Stage 5 Tour de Flores, Daniel Whitehouse
