= Michael Torckler =

New Zealand cyclist (born 1987)

Personal information
- Full name: Michael Torckler
- Born: 12 April 1987 (age 39)

Cycling career
- Sport: Cycling
- Current team: GD Pringle p/b Spoken Cycles
- Discipline: Road
- Role: Rider
- Rider type: All-rounder

Amateur teams
- 2008: The Southland Times–Trek
- 2009–2010: Azysa–Conor WRC
- 2012: PureBlack Racing
- 2016: Trust House
- 2017–2018: Blindz Direct
- 2019–: GD Pringle Building–Spoken Cycles

Professional teams
- 2011: PureBlack Racing
- 2013: Bissell
- 2014: Team SmartStop
- 2015: Team Budget Forklifts

Michael Torckler (born 12 April 1987) is a New Zealand cyclist, who currently rides for New Zealand amateur team GD Pringle p/b Spoken Cycles.

== Career ==
During 2012, Torckler was staying at Santa Rosa, California to train for upcoming competitions. On one of his training rides, on 30 June, he was hit by a car coming around a bend. He was thrown off his bike and hit the car windshield, breaking his arm and almost killing him.

The driver fled the scene but was later caught and was sentenced to 10 years and four months in prison. Meanwhile, Torckler was airlifted to the nearest hospital, where he arrived in critical condition, close to death. Although he was not brain damaged from the accident, he had no recollection of the accident. He was immediately moved to intensive care, and was discharged after only 12 days.

After returning to New Zealand after only a month after his accident, Torckler was back on his bike and starting to train again. After four months, he returned to racing at the 2012 Tour of Southland and finished the race in 61st place. Known as 'King of the Comebacks', Torckler raced in the Tour of Utah, and even won the King of the Mountains title.

In November 2014 Torckler was announced as part of the Team Budget Forklifts line-up for 2015.

== Major results ==
2005
5th Road race, Oceania Under-23 Road Championships
2009
1st Time trial, National Under-23 Road Championships
2nd Overall Vuelta a la Montaña Central de Asturias
6th Overall Tour of Wellington
2010
1st Overall Tour of Wellington

1st Stage 2

1st Overall San Martin Proba de Ataun
1st Overall Clásica Ciudad de Torredonjimeno
2012
1st Overall Tour of Borneo

1st Points classification
1st Stage 1

8th Overall Jelajah Malaysia
2013
1st Mountains classification Tour of Utah
4th Overall New Zealand Cycle Classic
2015
3rd The REV Classic
2016
6th Overall New Zealand Cycle Classic
2017
10th Overall New Zealand Cycle Classic
2018
2nd Gravel and Tar
3rd Road race, National Road Championships
9th Overall New Zealand Cycle Classic
2019
7th Overall New Zealand Cycle Classic
2021
2nd Road race, National Road Championships
