= Roman Van Uden =

New Zealand cyclist

Roman van Uden
Personal information
- Born: 29 October 1988 (age 37)

Cycling career
- Sport: Cycling
- Discipline: Road
- Role: Rider

Amateur teams
- 2014: Carbon Wheels
- 2017: CCN Factory Racing
- 2018: New Zealand Cycling Project

Professional teams
- 2009: Land Rover-Orbea
- 2011–2012: PureBlack Racing
- 2013: Node 4–Giordana Racing
- 2014–2015: CCN

Roman van Uden (born 29 October 1988) is a New Zealand professional cyclist.

== Major results ==
2009
1st Stage 4 Tour of the Gila
2010
5th Time trial, National Road Championships
2011
1st Points classification Tour of Utah
9th Road race, National Road Championships
2013
1st Overall Sharjah International Cycling Tour

1st Stage 1

5th Overall New Zealand Cycle Classic
7th Overall Tour of Al Zubarah

1st Stage 3

9th Road race, National Road Championships
2014
5th Overall Sharjah International Cycling Tour
7th Overall Tour of Al Zubarah

1st Prologue

2015
9th The REV Classic
