= Tour de Jakarta =

Race details
- Date: July
- Region: Indonesia
- Discipline: Road
- Competition: UCI Asia Tour
- Type: One day race

History
- First edition: 2016
- Editions: 1
- First winner: Ryan MacAnally (AUS)
- Most wins: No repeat winners
- Most recent: Ryan MacAnally (AUS)

The Tour de Flores is a one-day cycling race in Indonesia. It is part of UCI Asia Tour in category 1.2.

== Winners ==
Year	Country	Rider	Team
2016	Australia	Ryan MacAnally	Pegasus Continental Cycling Team
