= Tour of Borneo =

Malaysian bike race

Tour de Borneo
Race details
- Date: April (2012); August (2013); October-November (2015)
- Region: Sabah and Federal Territory of Labuan
- English name: Tour of Borneo
- Local name: Jelajah Borneo (in Malay)
- Discipline: Road
- Competition: UCI Asia Tour 2.2
- Type: Stage race
- Organiser: Malaysian National Cycling Federation
- Web site: www.tourofborneo.com/index.asp

History
- First edition: 2012
- Editions: 3 (as of 2015)
- First winner: Michael Torckler (NZL)
- Most recent: Peeter Pruus (EST)

The Tour de Borneo was an annual professional road bicycle racing stage race held in the state of Sabah and the Federal Territory of Labuan in East Malaysia since 2012, named after Borneo where they are located. The race was part of the UCI Asia Tour and was classified by the International Cycling Union (UCI) as a 2.2 category races. The 2013 edition of the race was won by Ghader Mizbani of Iran.

== Past winners ==
Years	Winner	Second	Third
2012	(New Zealand) Michael Torckler	(Australia) Nathan Earle	(Australia) Jonathan Lovelock
2013	(Iran) Ghader Mizbani	(Iran) Samad Pourseyedi	(New Zealand) Joseph Cooper
2015	(Estonia) Peeter Pruus	(Indonesia) Hadi Fitrianto	(Philippines) Mark Galedo
