= 2008 Jelajah Malaysia =

2007–08 UCI Asia Tour

Race details
- Dates: 7–13 January 2008
- Stages: 7
- Distance: 1,352.2 km (840.2 mi)
- Winning time: 21h 32' 38"

Results
Jersey awarded to the overall winner	Winner	Tonton Susanto (INA)	(LeTua Cycling Team)
	Second	Ghader Mizbani (IRI)	(Tabriz Petrochemical Team)
	Third	Fredrik Johansson (SWE)	(Differdange–Apiflo Vacances)
Jersey awarded to the points classification winner	Points	Anuar Manan (MAS)	(LeTua Cycling Team)
Jersey awarded to the mountains classification winner	Mountains	Hossein Askari (IRI)	(Tabriz Petrochemical Team)
	Team	Tabriz Petrochemical Team	

The 2008 Jelajah Malaysia, a cycling stage race that took place in Malaysia. It was held from 7 to 13 January 2008. There were seven stages with a total of 1,352.2 kilometres. In fact, the race was sanctioned by the Union Cycliste Internationale as a 2.2 category race and was part of the 2007–08 UCI Asia Tour calendar.

Tonton Susanto of Indonesia won the race, followed by Ghader Mizbani of Iran second and Fredrik Johansson of Sweden third overall. Anuar Manan of Malaysia won the points classification and Hossein Askari of Iran won the mountains classification. Tabriz Petrochemical Team won the team classification.

A total of 20 teams were invited to participate in the 2008 Jelajah Malaysia. Out of 120 riders, a total of 91 riders made it to the finish in Kuala Lumpur.

== Stages ==
Stage	Date	Course	Distance	Stage result		
Stage	Date	Course	Distance	Winner	Second	Third
1	7 January	Putrajaya to Port Dickson	179.7 km (111.7 mi)	Li Fuyu (CHN)	Marcel Strauss (SUI)	Jacob Nielsen (DEN)
2	8 January	Seremban to Malacca	139.5 km (86.7 mi)	Anuar Manan (MAS)	Serguei Kudentsov (RUS)	Kohei Uchima (JPN)
3	9 January	Malacca to Batu Pahat	163.8 km (101.8 mi)	Anuar Manan (MAS)	Hossein Nateghi (IRI)	Serguei Kudentsov (RUS)
4	10 January	Batu Pahat to Muar	178.8 km (111.1 mi)	Fredrik Johansson (SWE)	Kohei Uchima (JPN)	Tonton Susanto (INA)
5	11 January	Gemas to Karak	133.7 km (83.1 mi)	Anuar Manan (MAS)	Hossein Nateghi (IRI)	Cyrille Heymans (LUX)
6	12 January	Kuala Kubu Bharu to Genting Highlands	122.2 km (75.9 mi)	Hossein Askari (IRI)	David McCann (IRI)	Tonton Susanto (INA)
7	13 January	Kuala Lumpur Criterium	58 km (36.0 mi)	Yusuke Hatanaka (JPN)	Hossein Nateghi (IRI)	Hari Fitrianto (INA)

== Classification leadership ==
Stage	Stage winner	General classification	Points classification	Mountains classification	Malaysian rider classification	Team classification
1	Li Fuyu	Li Fuyu	Anuar Manan	Hossein Askari	Amir Rusli	Team Stegcomputer-CKT-Cogeas
2	Anuar Manan	Li Fuyu	Anuar Manan	Hossein Askari	Amir Rusli	Team Stegcomputer-CKT-Cogeas
3	Anuar Manan	Li Fuyu	Anuar Manan	Hossein Askari	Amir Rusli	Team Stegcomputer-CKT-Cogeas
4	Fredrik Johansson	Tonton Susanto	Anuar Manan	Hossein Askari	Suhardi Hassan	Japan
5	Anuar Manan	Tonton Susanto	Anuar Manan	Hossein Askari	Suhardi Hassan	Japan
6	Hossein Askari	Tonton Susanto	Anuar Manan	Hossein Askari	Suhardi Hassan	Tabriz Petrochemical Team
7	Yusuke Hatanaka	Tonton Susanto	Anuar Manan	Hossein Askari	Suhardi Hassan	Tabriz Petrochemical Team
Final		Tonton Susanto	Anuar Manan	Hossein Askari	Suhardi Hassan	Tabriz Petrochemical Team

== Final standings ==
=== General classification ===
	Rider	Team	Time
1	(Indonesia) Tonton Susanto	LeTua Cycling Team	21h 32' 38"
2	(Iran) Ghader Mizbani	Tabriz Petrochemical Team	+ 11"
3	(Sweden) Fredrik Johansson	Differdange–Apiflo Vacances	+ 04' 16"
4	(Iran) Hossein Askari	Tabriz Petrochemical Team	+ 05' 11"
5	(Malaysia) Suhardi Hassan	Kuala Lumpur	+ 06' 22"
6	(Liechtenstein) Dimitri Jiriakov	Team Stegcomputer-CKT-Cogeas	+ 07' 01"
7	(Republic of Ireland) Paul Griffin	Giant Asia Racing Team	+ 07' 08"
8	(Indonesia) Hari Fitrianto	Polygon Sweet Nice	+ 08' 14"
9	(Malaysia) Mohd Fauzan Ahmad Lutfi	Majlis Sukan Negara Malaysia	+ 08' 15"
10	(Republic of Ireland) David McCann	Giant Asia Racing Team	+ 08' 42"

=== Points classification ===
	Rider	Team	Points
1	(Malaysia) Anuar Manan	LeTua Cycling Team	29
2	(Iran) Hossein Jahanbanian	Tabriz Petrochemical Team	21
3	(Malaysia) Suhardi Hassan	Kuala Lumpur	15
4	(Japan) Makoto Iijima	Japan	13
5	(Malaysia) Mohd Sayuti Mohd Zahit	LeTua Cycling Team	12
6	(Malaysia) Mohamed Harrif Salleh	MNCF Continental Team	12
7	(Iran) Abbas Saeidi Tanha	Islamic Azad University Cycling Team	8
8	(Denmark) Jacob Nielsen	Team Farso	6
9	(Japan) Shinpei Fukuda	Japan	6
10	(Malaysia) Mohamed Zamri Salleh	Majlis Sukan Negara Malaysia	6

=== Mountains classification ===
	Rider	Team	Points
1	(Iran) Hossein Askari	Tabriz Petrochemical Team	16
2	(Indonesia) Tonton Susanto	LeTua Cycling Team	8
3	(Republic of Ireland) David McCann	Giant Asia Racing Team	6
4	(Republic of Ireland) Paul Griffin	Giant Asia Racing Team	5
5	(Iran) Farshad Salehian	Islamic Azad University Cycling Team	3
6	(Indonesia) Agung Ali Sahbana	Indonesia	3
7	(Iran) Ghader Mizbani	Tabriz Petrochemical Team	3
8	(Liechtenstein) Dimitri Jiriakov	Team Stegcomputer-CKT-Cogeas	3
9	(Malaysia) Suhardi Hassan	Kuala Lumpur	2
10	(Indonesia) Hari Fitrianto	Polygon Sweet Nice	2

=== Malaysian rider classification ===
	Rider	Team	Time
1	(Malaysia) Suhardi Hassan	Kuala Lumpur	21h 39' 00"
2	(Malaysia) Mohd Fauzan Ahmad Lutfi	Majlis Sukan Negara Malaysia	+ 01' 53"
3	(Malaysia) Loh Sea Keong	Trek–Marco Polo	+ 07' 15"
4	(Malaysia) Mohd Rauf Nor Misbah	Majlis Sukan Negara Malaysia	+ 07' 22"
5	(Malaysia) Mohd Faris Abd Razak	Majlis Sukan Negara Malaysia	+ 07' 43"
6	(Malaysia) Weng Kin Thum	MNCF Continental Team	+ 08' 39"
7	(Malaysia) Amir Rusli	MNCF Continental Team	+ 09' 57"
8	(Malaysia) Mohd Saiful Anuar Aziz	MNCF Continental Team	+ 11' 55"
9	(Malaysia) Mohd Nor Umardi Rosdi	Putrajaya Cycling Team	+ 12' 01"
10	(Malaysia) Ahmad Haidar Anuawar	LeTua Cycling Team	+ 13' 01"

=== Team classification ===
	Team	Time
1	Tabriz Petrochemical Team	64h 54' 33"
2	Japan	+ 09' 35"
3	LeTua Cycling Team	+ 09' 50"
4	Trek–Marco Polo	+ 16' 47"
5	Majlis Sukan Negara Malaysia	+ 19' 32"
6	Giant Asia Racing Team	+ 21' 27"
7	Polygon Sweet Nice	+ 22' 00"
8	Differdange–Apiflo Vacances	+ 22' 34"
9	Islamic Azad University Cycling Team	+ 23' 35"
10	Team Stegcomputer-CKT-Cogeas	+ 27' 04"

== Stage results ==
=== Stage 1 ===
7 January 2008 — Putrajaya to Port Dickson, 179.7 km (111.7 mi)

	Rider	Team	Time
1	(China) Li Fuyu	Trek–Marco Polo	04h 12' 19"
2	(Switzerland) Marcel Strauss	Team Stegcomputer-CKT-Cogeas	s.t.
3	(Denmark) Jacob Nielsen	Team Farso	s.t.
4	(Republic of Ireland) Paul Griffin	Giant Asia Racing Team	s.t.
5	(Iran) Hossein Askari	Tabriz Petrochemical Team	s.t.
6	(Liechtenstein) Dimitri Jiriakov	Team Stegcomputer-CKT-Cogeas	s.t.
7	(Japan) Makoto Iijima	Bridgestone Anchor	+ 01' 07"
8	(Iran) Mehdi Sohrabi	Islamic Azad University Cycling Team	s.t.
9	(Indonesia) Ryan Ariehan	LeTua Cycling Team	s.t.
10	(Indonesia) Taufik Mohamad	Benteng Muda Selangor Cycling Team	s.t.

=== Stage 2 ===
8 January 2008 — Seremban to Malacca, 139.5 km (86.7 mi)

	Rider	Team	Time
1	(Malaysia) Anuar Manan	LeTua Cycling Team	03h 07' 55"
2	(Russia) Serguei Kudentsov	Trek–Marco Polo	s.t.
3	(Japan) Kohei Uchima	Japan	s.t.
4	(Malaysia) Mohamed Harrif Salleh	MNCF Continental Team	s.t.
5	(Malaysia) Mohamed Zamri Salleh	Malaysia	s.t.
6	(China) Li Fuyu	Trek–Marco Polo	s.t.
7	(Japan) Shinpei Fukuda	Bridgestone Anchor	s.t.
8	(Japan) Masakazu Ito	Japan	s.t.
9	(Iran) Hossein Nateghi	Tabriz Petrochemical Team	s.t.
10	(Netherlands) Lex Nederlof	Putrajaya Cycling Team	s.t.

=== Stage 3 ===
9 January 2008 — Malacca to Batu Pahat, 163.8 km (101.8 mi)

	Rider	Team	Time
1	(Malaysia) Anuar Manan	LeTua Cycling Team	03h 55' 35"
2	(Iran) Hossein Nateghi	Tabriz Petrochemical Team	s.t.
3	(Russia) Serguei Kudentsov	Trek–Marco Polo	s.t.
4	(Germany) Stefan Löffler	Giant Asia Racing Team	s.t.
5	(Japan) Kohei Uchima	Japan	s.t.
6	(Malaysia) Suhardi Hassan	Kuala Lumpur	s.t.
7	(Japan) Shinpei Fukuda	Bridgestone Anchor	s.t.
8	(Netherlands) Tjarco Cuppens	Differdange–Apiflo Vacances	s.t.
9	(Indonesia) Heksa Priya Prasetya	Indonesia	s.t.
10	(Malaysia) Mohammad Akmal Amrun	MNCF Continental Team	s.t.

=== Stage 4 ===
10 January 2008 — Batu Pahat to Muar, 178.8 km (111.1 mi)

	Rider	Team	Time
1	(Sweden) Fredrik Johansson	Differdange–Apiflo Vacances	04h 04' 31"
2	(Japan) Kohei Uchima	Japan	+ 03"
3	(Indonesia) Tonton Susanto	LeTua Cycling Team	s.t.
4	(Hong Kong) Lam Kai Tsun	Trek–Marco Polo	s.t.
5	(Malaysia) Suhardi Hassan	Kuala Lumpur	s.t.
6	(Iran) Abbas Saeidi Tanha	Islamic Azad University Cycling Team	s.t.
7	(Iran) Ghader Mizbani	Tabriz Petrochemical Team	s.t.
8	(Japan) Kazushige Kuboki	Japan	s.t.
9	(Japan) Tomoya Kano	Skil–Shimano	s.t.
10	(Japan) Masakazu Ito	Japan	s.t.

=== Stage 5 ===
11 January 2008 — Gemas to Karak, 133.7 km (83.1 mi)

	Rider	Team	Time
1	(Malaysia) Anuar Manan	LeTua Cycling Team	03h 00' 54"
2	(Iran) Hossein Nateghi	Tabriz Petrochemical Team	s.t.
3	(Luxembourg) Cyrille Heymanns	Differdange–Apiflo Vacances	s.t.
4	(Iran) Mehdi Sohrabi	Islamic Azad University Cycling Team	s.t.
5	(Netherlands) Tjarco Cuppens	Differdange–Apiflo Vacances	s.t.
6	(Japan) Masahiko Mifune	Matrix Powertag	s.t.
7	(China) Li Fuyu	Trek–Marco Polo	s.t.
8	(Hong Kong) Lam Kai Tsun	Trek–Marco Polo	s.t.
9	(Netherlands) Lex Nederlof	Putrajaya Cycling Team	s.t.
10	(Malaysia) Mohamed Harrif Salleh	MNCF Continental Team	s.t.

=== Stage 6 ===
12 January 2008 — Kuala Kubu Bharu to Genting Highlands, 122.2 km (75.9 mi)

	Rider	Team	Time
1	(Iran) Hossein Askari	Tabriz Petrochemical Team	03h 10' 11"
2	(Republic of Ireland) David McCann	Giant Asia Racing Team	+ 10"
3	(Indonesia) Tonton Susanto	LeTua Cycling Team	+ 12"
4	(Iran) Ghader Mizbani	Tabriz Petrochemical Team	+ 14"
5	(Indonesia) Hari Fitrianto	Polygon Sweet Nice	+ 01' 37"
6	(Liechtenstein) Dimitri Jiriakov	Team Stegcomputer-CKT-Cogeas	s.t.
7	(Malaysia) Mohd Fauzan Ahmad Lutfi	Majlis Sukan Negara Malaysia	+ 01' 41"
8	(Republic of Ireland) Paul Griffin	Giant Asia Racing Team	+ 01' 46"
9	(China) Liu Yilin	Trek–Marco Polo	+ 01' 59"
10	(Denmark) Søren Petersen	Team Farso	+ 02' 22"

=== Stage 7 ===
13 January 2008 — Kuala Lumpur Criterium, 58 km (36.0 mi)

	Rider	Team	Time
1	(Japan) Yusuke Hatanaka	Skil–Shimano	01h 07' 57"
2	(Iran) Hossein Nateghi	Tabriz Petrochemical Team	s.t.
3	(Indonesia) Hari Fitrianto	Polygon Sweet Nice	s.t.
4	(Malaysia) Mohd Rauf Nor Misbah	Majlis Sukan Negara Malaysia	s.t.
5	(Germany) Stefan Löffler	Giant Asia Racing Team	+ 17"
6	(Malaysia) Ahmad Haidar Anuawar	LeTua Cycling Team	s.t.
7	(Luxembourg) Cyrille Heymanns	Differdange–Apiflo Vacances	s.t.
8	(Japan) Masahiko Mifune	Matrix Powertag	s.t.
9	(Malaysia) Mohamed Harrif Salleh	MNCF Continental Team	s.t.
10	(Iran) Mehdi Sohrabi	Islamic Azad University Cycling Team	s.t.
