= 2010 Jelajah Malaysia =

2009–10 UCI Asia Tour

Race details
- Dates: 27 April–1 May 2010
- Stages: 5
- Distance: 822.1 km (510.8 mi)
- Winning time: 18h 56' 40"

Results
Jersey awarded to the overall winner	Winner	David McCann (IRL)	(Giant Asia Racing Team)
	Second	Takumi Beppu (JPN)	(Aisan Racing Team)
	Third	Amir Rusli (MAS)	(Malaysia)
Jersey awarded to the points classification winner	Points	Malcolm Lange (RSA)	(Medscheme Cycling Team)
Jersey awarded to the mountains classification winner	Mountains	Matnur (INA)	(Polygon Sweet Nice)
	Team	LeTua Cycling Team	

The 2010 Jelajah Malaysia, a cycling stage race that took place in Malaysia. It was held from 27 April to 1 May 2010. There were five stages with a total of 822.1 kilometres. In fact, the race was sanctioned by the Union Cycliste Internationale as a 2.2 category race and was part of the 2009–10 UCI Asia Tour calendar.

David McCann of Ireland won the race, followed by Takumi Beppu of Japan second and Amir Rusli of Malaysia third overall. Malcolm Lange of South Africa won the points classification and Matnur of Indonesia won the mountains classification. LeTua Cycling Team won the team classification.

== Stages ==
Stage	Date	Course	Distance	Stage result		
Stage	Date	Course	Distance	Winner	Second	Third
1	27 April	Kuala Selangor to Teluk Batik	192.4 km (119.6 mi)	Mohd Shahrul Mat Amin (MAS)	Ahmad Fallanie Ali (MAS)	Amir Rusli (MAS)
2	28 April	Teluk Batik to Taiping	205.4 km (127.6 mi)	Johann Rabie (RSA)	David McCann (IRL)	Mark O'Brien (AUS)
3	29 April	Taiping to Juru	126.1 km (78.4 mi)	Malcolm Lange (RSA)	Arran Brown (RSA)	Mohamed Zamri Salleh (MAS)
4	30 April	Juru to Sungai Petani	93.1 km (57.8 mi)	Suhardi Hassan (MAS)	Parno (INA)	Adiq Husainie Othman (MAS)
5	1 May	Sungai Petani to Kuala Perlis	205.3 km (127.6 mi)	Mark O'Brien (AUS)	Mohammad Zangi Abadi (IRI)	Waylon Woolcock (RSA)

== Classification leadership ==
Stage	Stage winner	General classification	Points classification	Mountains classification	Asian rider classification	Team classification	Asian team classification
1	Mohd Shahrul Mat Amin	Mohd Shahrul Mat Amin	Ahmad Fallanie Ali	not available	Mohd Shahrul Mat Amin	Malaysian Armed Forces	Malaysian Armed Forces
2	Johann Rabie	David McCann	Malcolm Lange	Matnur	Amir Rusli	LeTua Cycling Team	LeTua Cycling Team
3	Malcolm Lange	David McCann	Malcolm Lange	Matnur	Amir Rusli	LeTua Cycling Team	LeTua Cycling Team
4	Suhardi Hassan	David McCann	Malcolm Lange	Matnur	Amir Rusli	LeTua Cycling Team	LeTua Cycling Team
5	Mark O'Brien	David McCann	Malcolm Lange	Matnur	Amir Rusli	LeTua Cycling Team	LeTua Cycling Team
Final		David McCann	Malcolm Lange	Matnur	Amir Rusli	LeTua Cycling Team	LeTua Cycling Team

== Final standings ==
=== General classification ===
	Rider	Team	Time
1	(Republic of Ireland) David McCann	Giant Asia Racing Team	18h 56' 40"
2	(Japan) Takumi Beppu	Aisan Racing Team	+ 20"
3	(Malaysia) Amir Rusli	Malaysia	+ 01' 01"
4	(Indonesia) Dadi Suryadi	Indonesia	+ 03' 30"
5	(South Africa) Malcolm Lange	Medscheme Cycling Team	+ 03' 31"
6	(Iran) Alireza Asgharzadeh	Vali ASR Kerman Cycling Team	+ 04' 11"
7	(Malaysia) Adiq Husainie Othman	Malaysia	+ 04' 13"
8	(Indonesia) Parno	Customs Cycling Club	+ 04' 46"
9	(Iran) Saied Nateghi	Vali ASR Kerman Cycling Team	+ 05' 22"
10	(Malaysia) Adrian Chuah Wye Kit	LeTua Cycling Team	+ 06' 21"

=== Points classification ===
	Rider	Team	Time
1	(South Africa) Malcolm Lange	Medscheme Cycling Team	53
2	(Malaysia) Mohamed Zamri Salleh	Malaysian Armed Forces	43
3	(Malaysia) Suhardi Hassan	Kuala Lumpur	40
4	(Malaysia) Amir Rusli	Malaysia	32
5	(Russia) Serguei Kudentsov	Polygon Sweet Nice	30
6	(Australia) Mark O'Brien	LeTua Cycling Team	28
7	(Malaysia) Mohamed Harrif Salleh	Malaysia	27
8	(South Africa) Arran Brown	Medscheme Cycling Team	26
9	(Malaysia) Mohd Shahrul Mat Amin	Malaysian Armed Forces	24
10	(Malaysia) Wan Mohd Najmee Wan Mohamad	Kuala Lumpur	23

=== Mountains classification ===
	Rider	Team	Time
1	(Indonesia) Matnur	Polygon Sweet Nice	8
2	(South Africa) Johann Rabie	Medscheme Cycling Team	7
3	(Malaysia) Suhardi Hassan	Kuala Lumpur	4
4	(Indonesia) Endra Wisaya	Customs Cycling Club	4
5	(Malaysia) Yusrizal Yusof	Terengganu	4
6	(Malaysia) Muaz Abd. Rahim	Majlis Sukan Negara Malaysia	2
7	(Indonesia) Hari Fitrianto	Polygon Sweet Nice	2
8	(Japan) Takumi Beppu	Aisan Racing Team	1
9	(Japan) Shinpei Fukuda	Aisan Racing Team	1
10	(Iran) Mohammad Zangi Abadi	Vali ASR Kerman Cycling Team	1

=== Team classification ===
	Team	Time
1	LeTua Cycling Team	56h 57' 24"
2	Medscheme Cycling Team	+ 04' 28"
3	Giant Asia Racing Team	+ 06' 53"
4	Malaysia	+ 08' 03"
5	Aisan Racing Team	+ 10' 30"
6	Vali ASR Kerman Cycling Team	+ 11' 38"
7	Polygon Sweet Nice	+ 12' 51"
8	Malaysian Armed Forces	+ 14' 06"
9	Customs Cycling Club	+ 14' 50"
10	Kuala Lumpur	+ 17' 27"

=== Asian rider classification ===
	Rider	Team	Time
1	(Malaysia) Amir Rusli	Malaysia	18h 57' 41"
2	(Indonesia) Dadi Suryadi	Indonesia	+ 02' 29"
3	(Malaysia) Adiq Husainie Othman	Malaysia	+ 03' 12"
4	(Indonesia) Parno	Custom Cycling Club	+ 03' 45"
5	(Malaysia) Adrian Chuah Wye Kit	LeTua Cycling Team	+ 05' 20"
6	(Malaysia) Yusrizal Yusof	Terengganu	+ 05' 23"
7	(Malaysia) Mohd Shahrul Mat Amin	Malaysian Armed Forces	+ 05' 52"
8	(Malaysia) Suhardi Hassan	Kuala Lumpur	+ 05' 56"
9	(Malaysia) Sarham Miswan	Selangor	+ 06' 16"
10	(Thailand) Prajak Mahawong	Giant Asia Racing Team	+ 06' 17"

=== Asian team classification ===
	Team	Time
1	LeTua Cycling Team	56h 57' 24"
2	Malaysia	+ 08' 03"
3	Polygon Sweet Nice	+ 12' 51"
4	Malaysian Armed Forces	+ 14' 06"
5	Customs Cycling Club	+ 14' 50"
6	Kuala Lumpur	+ 17' 27"
7	Terengganu	+ 22' 07"
8	Indonesia	+ 22' 57"
9	Johor	+ 33' 57"
10	OCBC Singapore Continental Cycling Team	+ 38' 02"

=== Malaysian rider classification ===
	Rider	Team	Time
1	(Malaysia) Amir Rusli	Malaysia	18h 57' 41"
2	(Malaysia) Adiq Husainie Othman	Malaysia	+ 03' 12"
3	(Malaysia) Adrian Chuah Wye Kit	LeTua Cycling Team	+ 05' 20"
4	(Malaysia) Yusrizal Yusof	Terengganu	+ 05' 23"
5	(Malaysia) Mohd Shahrul Mat Amin	Malaysian Armed Forces	+ 05' 52"
6	(Malaysia) Suhardi Hassan	Kuala Lumpur	+ 05' 56"
7	(Malaysia) Sarham Miswan	Selangor	+ 06' 16"
8	(Malaysia) Mohamed Zamri Salleh	Malaysian Armed Forces	+ 06' 17"
9	(Malaysia) Mohd Hafiz Rozli	LeTua Cycling Team	+ 06' 32"
10	(Malaysia) Wan Mohd Najmee Wan Mohamad	Kuala Lumpur	+ 06' 42"

=== Malaysian team classification ===
	Team	Time
1	LeTua Cycling Team	56h 57' 24"
2	Malaysia	+ 08' 03"
3	Malaysian Armed Forces	+ 14' 06"
4	Kuala Lumpur	+ 17' 27"
5	Terengganu	+ 22' 07"
6	Johor	+ 33' 57"
7	Majlis Sukan Negara Malaysia	+ 38' 32"

== Stage results ==
=== Stage 1 ===
27 April 2010 — Kuala Selangor to Teluk Batik, 192.4 km (119.6 mi)

	Rider	Team	Time
1	(Malaysia) Mohd Shahrul Mat Amin	Malaysian Armed Forces	04h 19' 37"
2	(Malaysia) Ahmad Fallanie Ali	Kuala Lumpur	+ 02"
3	(Malaysia) Amir Rusli	Malaysia	+ 14"
4	(Malaysia) Wan Mohd Najmee Wan Mohamad	Kuala Lumpur	s.t.
5	(Malaysia) Mohamed Zamri Salleh	Malaysian Armed Forces	s.t.
6	(Indonesia) Nunung Burhanudin	Indonesia	s.t.
7	(United Kingdom) Alex Coutts	Giant Asia Racing Team	s.t.
8	(Malaysia) Mohd Nur Rizuan Zainal	Malaysian Armed Forces	s.t.
9	(Japan) Takumi Beppu	Aisan Racing Team	s.t.
10	(Malaysia) Mohammad Akmal Amrun	Malaysia	s.t.

=== Stage 2 ===
28 April 2010 — Teluk Batik to Taiping, 205.2 km (127.5 mi)

	Rider	Team	Time
1	(South Africa) Johann Rabie	Medscheme Cycling Team	04h 49' 51"
2	(Republic of Ireland) David McCann	Giant Asia Racing Team	+ 03"
3	(Australia) Mark O'Brien	LeTua Cycling Team	+ 14"
4	(Japan) Takumi Beppu	Aisan Racing Team	+ 17"
5	(Malaysia) Yusrizal Yusof	Terengganu	+ 01' 03"
6	(Malaysia) Amir Rusli	Malaysia	s.t.
7	(Indonesia) Matnur	Polygon Sweet Nice	+ 03' 15"
8	(Indonesia) Herwin Jaya	Polygon Sweet Nice	+ 03' 22"
9	(Indonesia) Dadi Suryadi	Indonesia	+ 03' 27"
10	(Malaysia) Adrian Chuah Wye Kit	LeTua Cycling Team	s.t.

=== Stage 3 ===
29 April 2010 — Taiping to Juru, 205.2 km (127.5 mi)

	Rider	Team	Time
1	(South Africa) Malcolm Lange	Medscheme Cycling Team	02h 59' 02"
2	(South Africa) Arran Brown	Medscheme Cycling Team	s.t.
3	(Malaysia) Mohamed Zamri Salleh	Malaysian Armed Forces	s.t.
4	(Malaysia) Mohamed Harrif Salleh	Malaysia	s.t.
5	(Russia) Serguei Kudentsov	Polygon Sweet Nice	s.t.
6	(Malaysia) Suhardi Hassan	Kuala Lumpur	s.t.
7	(Malaysia) Mohd Nur Rizuan Zainal	Malaysian Armed Forces	s.t.
8	(Malaysia) Ahmad Fakrullah Alias	Pahang	s.t.
9	(Malaysia) Amir Rusli	Malaysia	s.t.
10	(Malaysia) Mohd Shobry Abdullah	Terengganu	s.t.

=== Stage 4 ===
30 April 2010 — Juru to Sungai Petani, 93.1 km (57.8 mi)

	Rider	Team	Time
1	(Malaysia) Suhardi Hassan	Kuala Lumpur	02h 06' 36"
2	(Indonesia) Parno	Customs Cycling Club	s.t.
3	(Malaysia) Adiq Husainie Othman	Malaysia	s.t.
4	(Malaysia) Mohd Shahrul Afiza Fauzan	Malaysian Armed Forces	s.t.
5	(Malaysia) Ng Yong Li	LeTua Cycling Team	s.t.
6	(South Africa) Malcolm Lange	Medscheme Cycling Team	+ 02' 53"
7	(Russia) Serguei Kudentsov	Polygon Sweet Nice	s.t.
8	(Malaysia) Mohamed Harrif Salleh	Malaysia	s.t.
9	(South Africa) Arran Brown	Medscheme Cycling Team	s.t.
10	(South Africa) Hanco Kachelhoffer	Medscheme Cycling Team	s.t.

=== Stage 5 ===
1 May 2010 — Sungai Petani to Kuala Perlis, 205.3 km (127.6 mi)

	Rider	Team	Time
1	(Australia) Mark O'Brien	LeTua Cycling Team	04h 37' 10"
2	(Iran) Mohammad Zangi Abadi	Vali ASR Kerman Cycling Club	+ 39"
3	(South Africa) Waylon Woolcock	Medscheme Cycling Team	s.t.
4	(Indonesia) Hari Fitrianto	Polygon Sweet Nice	s.t.
5	(South Africa) Malcolm Lange	Medscheme Cycling Team	+ 01' 20"
6	(Russia) Serguei Kudentsov	Polygon Sweet Nice	s.t.
7	(Russia) Roman Krasilnikov	Polygon Sweet Nice	s.t.
8	(Malaysia) Mohd Hafiz Rozli	LeTua Cycling Team	s.t.
9	(Malaysia) Mohamed Harrif Salleh	Malaysia	s.t.
10	(Malaysia) Mohamed Zamri Salleh	Malaysian Armed Forces	s.t.

== List of teams and riders ==
A total of 19 teams were invited to participate in the 2010 Jelajah Malaysia. Out of 112 riders, a total of 80 riders made it to the finish in Kuala Perlis.

Aisan Racing Team

- (Japan) Takumi Beppu
- (Japan) Masahiro Shinagawa
- (Japan) Kenichi Suzuki
- (Japan) Mitsuhiro Matsumura
- (Japan) Shinpei Fukuda
- (Japan) Kazuhiro Mori

Giant Asia Racing Team

- (Republic of Ireland) David McCann
- (Thailand) Prajak Mahawong
- (Taiwan) Chang Wei Kei
- (Iran) Rasoul Barati
- (Taiwan) Peng Kuei Hsiang
- (United Kingdom) Alex Coutts

LeTua Cycling Team

- (Malaysia) Ng Yong Li
- (Malaysia) Mohd Hafiz Rozli
- (Malaysia) Adrian Chuah Wye Kit
- (Malaysia) Mohd Razif Mohd Salleh
- (Australia) Mark O'Brien
- (Australia) Paul Witmitz Samuel

Polygon Sweet Nice

- (Russia) Serguei Kudentsov
- (Indonesia) Hari Fitrianto
- (Indonesia) Rastra Patria Dinawan
- (Indonesia) Herwin Jaya
- (Indonesia) Matnur
- (Russia) Roman Krasilnikov

Vali ASR Kerman Team

- (Iran) Saied Nateghi
- (Iran) Jalil Eslami
- (Iran) Mohammad Zangi Abadi
- (Iran) Alireza Asgharzadeh
- (Iran) Seyed Mostafa Seyedrezaei
- (Iran) Seyed Moezeddin Seyedrezaei

Medscheme Cycling Team

- (South Africa) Malcolm Lange
- (South Africa) Hanco Kachelhoffer
- (South Africa) Johann Rabie
- (South Africa) Waylon Woolcock
- (South Africa) Luthando Kaka
- (South Africa) Arran Brown

OCBC Singapore Continental Cycling Team

- (Singapore) Junaidi Hashim
- (Singapore) Ang Kee Meng
- (Singapore) Lemnel Lee Yun Jie
- (Singapore) Vincent Ang
- (Singapore) Melvin Kow
- (Singapore) Goh Choon Huat

Custom Cycling Club

- (Indonesia) Erik Suprianto
- (Indonesia) Heksa Priya Prasetya
- (Indonesia) Iwan Setiawan
- (Indonesia) Parno
- (Indonesia) A. Agung Syahbana
- (Indonesia) Endra Wisaya

Malaysia

- (Malaysia) Mohd Rizal Tisin
- (Malaysia) Muhd Syamil Baharum
- (Malaysia) Mohamed Harrif Salleh
- (Malaysia) Adiq Husainie Othman
- (Malaysia) Mohammad Akmal Amrun
- (Malaysia) Amir Rusli

Brunei

- (Brunei) Mohd Halid Sata
- (Brunei) Reduan Yusop
- (Brunei) Muhammad Raihaan Abd Aziz
- (Brunei) Md Arbe Shadatul Farrani Zainul Ariffin
- (Brunei) Md. Rafiuddin Zakaria

Indonesia

- (Indonesia) Muhamad Taufik
- (Indonesia) Nugroho Kisnanto
- (Indonesia) Didit Purwanto
- (Indonesia) Dadi Suryadi
- (Indonesia) Nunung Burhanudin
- (Indonesia) Arin Iswana

Majlis Sukan Negara Malaysia

- (Malaysia) Muaz Abd Rahim
- (Malaysia) Aeliff Mohd Amin Alimen
- (Malaysia) Mohd Anaz Norman
- (Malaysia) Mohd Shahidan Shariff
- (Malaysia) Mohd Farhan Amri Zaid
- (Malaysia) Mohd Hafiz Mohd Zarawi

Kuala Lumpur

- (Malaysia) Wan Mohd Najmee Wan Mohamad
- (Malaysia) Ahmad Fallanie Ali
- (Malaysia) Mohd Khuzairi Abu Bakar
- (Malaysia) Suhardi Hassan
- (Malaysia) Mohd Amin Amiruddin
- (Malaysia) Mohd Hassannudin Wan
- (Malaysia) Mohd Syami Faris Tajuddin

Selangor

- (Malaysia) Mohamad Hafiz Mohamed Sufian
- (Malaysia) Sarham Miswan
- (Malaysia) Muhammad Azmi Mohammad Ali
- (Malaysia) Shahrin Amir
- (Malaysia) Norshahriel Haizat Ahmad Nazali
- (Malaysia) Muhammad Elmi Jumari

Terengganu

- (Malaysia) Syed Mohd Hussaini Syed Mazlan
- (Malaysia) Mohd Nor Umardi Rosdi
- (Malaysia) Mohd Saufie Mat Senan
- (Malaysia) Mohd Faiz Syarifuddin Abd Kadir
- (Malaysia) Mohd Shobry Abdullah
- (Malaysia) Yusrizal Yusof

Sabah

- (Malaysia) Nicklos Minol
- (Malaysia) Marvin George
- (Malaysia) Muhd Nur Hafiah Osman
- (Malaysia) Chai Eng Hou
- (Malaysia) Mohamad Zulkifli Mohamad Rosejati
- (Malaysia) Raijesy Ryner R. Anang

Malaysian Armed Forces

- (Malaysia) Mohamed Zamri Salleh
- (Malaysia) Mohd Nur Rizuan Zainal
- (Malaysia) Mohd Shahrul Mat Amin
- (Malaysia) Mohd Shahrul Afiza Fauzan
- (Malaysia) Mohd Fadhli Anwar Mohd Fauzi
- (Malaysia) Amirul Aswandi Amran

Pahang

- (Malaysia) Mohamad Aim Mohamad Fauzi
- (Malaysia) Mohd Yazrul Hisham Zulkifli
- (Malaysia) Mohad Shawal Mohd Shafee
- (Malaysia) Mohd Zarif Mohd Hashim
- (Malaysia) Ahmad Fakrullah Alias
- (Malaysia) Mohd Hazfiz Azeman

Johor

- (Malaysia) Muhamad Firdaus Daud
- (Malaysia) Muhamad Rizal Muhamad
- (Malaysia) Mohd Shahelmie Abd Karim
- (Malaysia) Mohd Nazri Muhamad
- (Malaysia) Khairul Naim Azhar
- (Malaysia) M. Fakhruddin Daud
