= 2009 Jelajah Malaysia =

2008–09 UCI Asia Tour

Race details
- Dates: 19–26 April 2009
- Stages: 8
- Distance: 1,256.8 km (780.9 mi)
- Winning time: 29h 31' 28"

Results
Jersey awarded to the overall winner	Winner	Timothy Roe (AUS)	(Savings & Loans Cycling Team)
	Second	Jai Crawford (AUS)	(Savings & Loans Cycling Team)
	Third	Ghader Mizbani (IRI)	(Tabriz Petrochemical Team)
Jersey awarded to the points classification winner	Points	Anuar Manan (MAS)	(Azad University Iran)
Jersey awarded to the mountains classification winner	Mountains	Abbas Saeiditanha (IRI)	(Azad University Iran)
	Team	Tabriz Petrochemical Team	

The 2009 Jelajah Malaysia, a cycling stage race that took place in Malaysia. It was held from 19 to 26 April 2009. There were eight stages with a total of 1,256.8 kilometres. In fact, the race was sanctioned by the Union Cycliste Internationale as a 2.2 category race and was part of the 2008–09 UCI Asia Tour calendar.

Timothy Roe of Australia won the race, followed by Jai Crawford of Australia second and Ghader Mizbani of Iran third overall. Anuar Manan of Malaysia won the points classification and Abbas Saeiditanha of Iran won the mountains classification. Azad University Iran won the team classification.

== Stages ==
Stage	Date	Course	Distance	Stage result		
Stage	Date	Course	Distance	Winner	Second	Third
1	19 April	Kuala Selangor to Ipoh	176.8 km (109.9 mi)	Makoto Iijima (JPN)	Amir Zargari (IRI)	Ahmad Haidar Anuawar (MAS)
2	20 April	Ipoh to Sungai Petani	192.7 km (119.7 mi)	Mehdi Sohrabi (IRI)	Anuar Manan (MAS)	Rafaâ Chtioui (TUN)
3	21 April	Gerik to Tanah Merah	172.3 km (107.1 mi)	Hossein Nateghi (IRI)	Rafaâ Chtioui (TUN)	Mehdi Sohrabi (IRI)
4	22 April	Pasir Mas to Kuala Terengganu	177.5 km (110.3 mi)	Anuar Manan (MAS)	Rafaâ Chtioui (TUN)	Serguei Kudentsov (RUS)
5	23 April	Kuala Terengganu to Kuantan	204.8 km (127.3 mi)	Anuar Manan (MAS)	Mohamed Harrif Salleh (MAS)	Serguei Kudentsov (RUS)
6	24 April	Gambang to Bera	136.1 km (84.6 mi)	Taiji Nishitani (JPN)	Joel Pearson (AUS)	Shaun McCarthy (AUS)
7	25 April	Tanjung Malim to Genting Highlands	117 km (72.7 mi)	Timothy Roe (AUS)	Ghader Mizbani (IRI)	Jai Crawford (AUS)
8	26 April	Kuala Lumpur Criterium	70.4 km (43.7 mi)	Hossein Nateghi (IRI)	Mehdi Sohrabi (IRI)	Rafaâ Chtioui (TUN)

== Classification leadership ==
Stage	Stage winner	General classification	Points classification	Mountains classification	Malaysian rider classification	Team classification	Malaysian team classification
1	Makoto Iijima	Makoto Iijima	Ahmad Haidar Anuawar	Makoto Iijima	Ahmad Haidar Anuawar	Azad University Iran	MNCF Continental Team
2	Mehdi Sohrabi	Makoto Iijima	Mehdi Sohrabi	Makoto Iijima	Ahmad Haidar Anuawar	Azad University Iran	Malaysia
3	Hossein Nateghi	Mehdi Sohrabi	Mehdi Sohrabi	Abbas Saeiditanha	Suhardi Hassan	Azad University Iran	Malaysia
4	Anuar Manan	Mehdi Sohrabi	Mehdi Sohrabi	Abbas Saeiditanha	Suhardi Hassan	Azad University Iran	Malaysia
5	Anuar Manan	Mehdi Sohrabi	Mehdi Sohrabi	Abbas Saeiditanha	Suhardi Hassan	Azad University Iran	Malaysia
6	Taiji Nishitani	Mehdi Sohrabi	Mehdi Sohrabi	Abbas Saeiditanha	Suhardi Hassan	Azad University Iran	Malaysia
7	Timothy Roe	Timothy Roe	Mohd Nur Rizuan Zainal	Abbas Saeiditanha	Muhammad Rauf Nur Misbah	Tabriz Petrochemical Team	LeTua Cycling Team
8	Hossein Nateghi	Timothy Roe	Anuar Manan	Abbas Saeiditanha	Muhammad Rauf Nur Misbah	Tabriz Petrochemical Team	LeTua Cycling Team
Final		Timothy Roe	Anuar Manan	Abbas Saeiditanha	Muhammad Rauf Nur Misbah	Tabriz Petrochemical Team	LeTua Cycling Team

== Final standings ==
=== General classification ===
	Rider	Team	Time
1	(Australia) Timothy Roe	Savings & Loans Cycling Team	29h 31' 28"
2	(Australia) Jai Crawford	Savings & Loans Cycling Team	+ 24"
3	(Iran) Ghader Mizbani	Tabriz Petrochemical Team	+ 25"
4	(Iran) Hossein Askari	Tabriz Petrochemical Team	+ 47"
5	(Republic of Ireland) David McCann	Ride Sport Racing	+ 01' 54"
6	(Tunisia) Rafaâ Chtioui	Doha Cycling Team	+ 02' 12"
7	(Indonesia) Hari Fitrianto	Polygon Sweet Nice	+ 02' 32"
8	(Iran) Mehdi Sohrabi	Tabriz Petrochemical Team	+ 02' 42"
9	(Canada) Will Routley	Jelly Belly Cycling Team	+ 02' 47"
10	(Indonesia) Tonton Susanto	LeTua Cycling Team	+ 03' 12"

=== Points classification ===
	Rider	Team	Points
1	(Malaysia) Anuar Manan	Azad University Iran	29
2	(Malaysia) Mohd Nor Rizuan Zainal	Malaysian Armed Forces Cycling Team	24
3	(Iran) Mehdi Sohrabi	Tabriz Petrochemical Team	20
4	(Japan) Yusutuke Tanaka	Shimano Racing Team	16
5	(Malaysia) Suhardi Hassan	Malaysia	15
6	(Iran) Abbas Saeiditanha	Azad University Iran	12
7	(China) Xing Yandong	Trek–Marco Polo	10
8	(Malaysia) Ahmad Fallanie Ali	Malaysia	10
9	(Iran) Hossein Nateghi	Azad University Iran	9
10	(Australia) David Pell	Savings & Loans Cycling Team	7

=== Mountains classification ===
	Rider	Team	Points
1	(Iran) Abbas Saeiditanha	Azad University Iran	15
2	(Iran) Mehdi Sohrabi	Tabriz Petrochemical Team	14
3	(Iran) Hossein Nateghi	Azad University Iran	11
4	(Algeria) Ezzedine Lagab	Doha Cycling Team	9
5	(Australia) Timothy Roe	Savings & Loans Cycling Team	8
6	(Republic of Ireland) David McCann	Ride Sport Racing	8
7	(Iran) Ghader Mizbani	Tabriz Petrochemical Team	6
8	(Australia) Jai Crawford	Savings & Loans Cycling Team	5
9	(Malaysia) Ng Yong Li	LeTua Cycling Team	5
10	(Iran) Hossein Askari	Tabriz Petrochemical Team	4

=== Malaysian rider classification ===
	Rider	Team	Time
1	(Malaysia) Muhammad Rauf Nur Misbah	Malaysia	29h 52' 24"
2	(Malaysia) Suhardi Hassan	Malaysia	+ 17"
3	(Malaysia) Mohd Saufi Mat Senan	Terengganu Toshiba Bike Labz Cycling Team	+ 03' 07"
4	(Malaysia) Mohd Shahrul Mat Amin	Terengganu Toshiba Bike Labz Cycling Team	+ 04' 50"
5	(Malaysia) Mohd Faris Abdul Razak	Malaysia	+ 14' 23"
6	(Malaysia) Ng Yong Li	LeTua Cycling Team	+ 16' 02"
7	(Malaysia) Ahmad Fallanie Ali	Malaysia	+ 20' 13"
8	(Malaysia) Mohd Saiful Anuar Aziz	Terengganu Toshiba Bike Labz Cycling Team	+ 20' 49"
9	(Malaysia) Mohd Nor Rizuan Zainal	Malaysian Armed Forces Cycling Team	+ 21' 11"
10	(Malaysia) Loh Sea Keong	Trek–Marco Polo	+ 21' 17"

=== Team classification ===
	Team	Time
1	Tabriz Petrochemical Team	88h 37' 12"
2	Azad University Iran	+ 09' 45"
3	Savings & Loans Cycling Team	+ 21' 35"
4	Ride Sport Racing	+ 23' 37"
5	Jelly Belly Cycling Team	+ 42' 01"
6	Shimano Racing Team	+ 44' 16"
7	Bridgestone–Anchor	+ 44' 54"
8	Trek–Marco Polo	+ 48' 56"
9	LeTua Cycling Team	+ 50' 39"
10	Malaysia	+ 55' 44"

=== Malaysian team classification ===
	Team	Time
1	LeTua Cycling Team	89h 27' 51"
2	Malaysia	+ 05' 05"
3	Terengganu Toshiba Bike Labz Cycling Team	+ 35' 26"
4	Malaysian Armed Forces Cycling Team	+ 01h 19' 17"
5	MNCF Continental Team	+ 01h 33' 55"

== Stage results ==
=== Stage 1 ===
19 April 2009 — Kuala Selangor to Ipoh, 176.8 km (109.9 mi)

	Rider	Team	Time
1	(Japan) Makoto Iijima	Bridgestone–Anchor	03h 59' 55"
2	(Iran) Amir Zargari	Azad University Iran	s.t.
3	(Malaysia) Ahmad Haidar Anuawar	Trek–Marco Polo	+ 34"
4	(Iran) Hossein Nateghi	Azad University Iran	s.t.
5	(Japan) Yusuke Hatanaka	Shimano Racing Team	s.t.
6	(Japan) Hidenori Nodera	Shimano Racing Team	s.t.
7	(Malaysia) Mohammad Akmal Amrun	MNCF Continental Team	s.t.
8	(Japan) Masamichi Yamamoto	Bridgestone–Anchor	s.t.
9	(Indonesia) Parno	Indonesia	s.t.
10	(Malaysia) Mohamed Harrif Salleh	Terengganu Toshiba Bike Labz Cycling Team	s.t.

=== Stage 2 ===
20 April 2009 — Ipoh to Sungai Petani, 192.7 km (119.7 mi)

	Rider	Team	Time
1	(Iran) Mehdi Sohrabi	Tabriz Petrochemical Team	04h 36' 09"
2	(Malaysia) Anuar Manan	Azad University Iran	s.t.
3	(Tunisia) Rafaâ Chtioui	Doha Cycling Team	s.t.
4	(Australia) Matthew Rice	Jelly Belly Cycling Team	s.t.
5	(Australia) Jai Crawford	Savings & Loans Cycling Team	s.t.
6	(Republic of Ireland) David McCann	Ride Sport Racing	s.t.
7	(Canada) Will Routley	Jelly Belly Cycling Team	s.t.
8	(United Kingdom) James Spragg	Trek–Marco Polo	s.t.
9	(Australia) Brad Hall	Tinelli Colossi Cycling Team	s.t.
10	(Indonesia) Rastra Patria	Indonesia	s.t.

=== Stage 3 ===
21 April 2009 — Gerik to Tanah Merah, 172.3 km (107.1 mi)

	Rider	Team	Time
1	(Iran) Hossein Nateghi	Azad University Iran	04h 05' 30"
2	(Tunisia) Rafaâ Chtioui	Doha Cycling Team	s.t.
3	(Iran) Mehdi Sohrabi	Tabriz Petrochemical Team	s.t.
4	(Canada) Will Routley	Jelly Belly Cycling Team	s.t.
5	(Japan) Yusuke Hatanaka	Shimano Racing Team	s.t.
6	(Malaysia) Mohd Saufi Mat Senan	Terengganu Toshiba Bike Labz Cycling Team	s.t.
7	(Australia) Deon Locke	Ride Sport Racing	s.t.
8	(Japan) Hidenori Nodera	Shimano Racing Team	s.t.
9	(Indonesia) Hari Fitrianto	Polygon Sweet Nice	s.t.
10	(Australia) David Pell	Savings & Loans Cycling Team	s.t.

=== Stage 4 ===
22 April 2009 — Pasir Mas to Kuala Terengganu, 177.5 km (110.3 mi)

	Rider	Team	Time
1	(Malaysia) Anuar Manan	Azad University Iran	04h 09' 21"
2	(Tunisia) Rafaâ Chtioui	Doha Cycling Team	s.t.
3	(Russia) Serguei Kudentsov	Polygon Sweet Nice	s.t.
4	(Japan) Masamichi Yamamoto	Bridgestone–Anchor	s.t.
5	(Republic of Ireland) David McCann	Ride Sport Racing	s.t.
6	(Iran) Mehdi Sohrabi	Tabriz Petrochemical Team	s.t.
7	(Malaysia) Muhamad Firdaus Daud	MNCF Continental Team	s.t.
8	(Malaysia) Mohd Faris Abdul Razak	Malaysia	s.t.
9	(Malaysia) Muhammad Zamani Mustarudin	MNCF Continental Team	s.t.
10	(Tunisia) Aymen Ben Hassine	Doha Cycling Team	s.t.

=== Stage 5 ===
23 April 2009 — Kuala Terengganu to Kuantan, 204.8 km (127.3 mi)

	Rider	Team	Time
1	(Malaysia) Anuar Manan	Azad University Iran	04h 49' 40"
2	(Malaysia) Mohamed Harrif Salleh	Terengganu Toshiba Bike Labz Cycling Team	s.t.
3	(Russia) Serguei Kudentsov	Polygon Sweet Nice	s.t.
4	(Thailand) Nattaphon Jeebtahwora	Thailand	s.t.
5	(Australia) Joel Pearson	Savings & Loans Cycling Team	s.t.
6	(Japan) Shinpei Fukuda	Bridgestone–Anchor	s.t.
7	(Iran) Mehdi Sohrabi	Tabriz Petrochemical Team	s.t.
8	(Japan) Taiji Nishitani	Aisan Racing Team	s.t.
9	(Japan) Yusuke Hatanaka	Shimano Racing Team	s.t.
10	(Iran) Hossein Nateghi	Azad University Iran	s.t.

=== Stage 6 ===
24 April 2009 — Gambang to Bera, 136.1 km (84.6 mi)

	Rider	Team	Time
1	(Japan) Taiji Nishitani	Aisan Racing Team	02h 52' 03"
2	(Australia) Joel Pearson	Savings & Loans Cycling Team	s.t.
3	(Australia) Shaun McCarthy	Ride Sport Racing	s.t.
4	(Canada) Will Routley	Jelly Belly Cycling Team	s.t.
5	(Algeria) Ezzedine Lagab	Doha Cycling Team	s.t.
6	(Malaysia) Wan Mohd Najmee Wan Mohd	Malaysia	s.t.
7	(Japan) Masahiro Shinagawa	Aisan Racing Team	s.t.
8	(Japan) Yoshinori Iino	Shimano Racing Team	s.t.
9	(Japan) Shinpei Fukuda	Bridgestone–Anchor	s.t.
10	(United Kingdom) James Spragg	Trek–Marco Polo	s.t.

=== Stage 7 ===
25 April 2009 — Tanjung Malim to Genting Highlands, 117 km (72.7 mi)

	Rider	Team	Time
1	(Australia) Timothy Roe	Savings & Loans Cycling Team	03h 01' 21"
2	(Iran) Ghader Mizbani	Tabriz Petrochemical Team	s.t.
3	(Australia) Jai Crawford	Savings & Loans Cycling Team	s.t.
4	(Iran) Hossein Askari	Tabriz Petrochemical Team	+ 35"
5	(Kazakhstan) Andrey Mizurov	Tabriz Petrochemical Team	+ 54"
6	(Republic of Ireland) David McCann	Ride Sport Racing	+ 01' 23"
7	(Tunisia) Rafaâ Chtioui	Doha Cycling Team	+ 01' 59"
8	(Indonesia) Hari Fitrianto	Polygon Sweet Nice	s.t.
9	(Japan) Takumi Beppu	Aisan Racing Team	+ 02' 02"
10	(Canada) Will Routley	Jelly Belly Cycling Team	+ 02' 35"

=== Stage 8 ===
26 April 2009 — Kuala Lumpur Criterium 70.4 km (43.7 mi)

	Rider	Team	Time
1	(Iran) Hossein Nateghi	Azad University Iran	01h 57' 08"
2	(Iran) Mehdi Sohrabi	Tabriz Petrochemical Team	s.t.
3	(Tunisia) Rafaâ Chtioui	Doha Cycling Team	s.t.
4	(Malaysia) Mohd Faris Abdul Razak	Malaysia	s.t.
5	(Japan) Masahiro Shinagawa	Aisan Racing Team	s.t.
6	(Republic of Ireland) David McCann	Ride Sport Racing	s.t.
7	(Japan) Yusuke Hatanaka	Shimano Racing Team	s.t.
8	(Japan) Hidenori Nodera	Shimano Racing Team	s.t.
9	(Australia) Joel Pearson	Savings & Loans Cycling Team	s.t.
10	(Taiwan) Kuei Hsiang Peng	Giant Asia Racing Team	s.t.

== List of teams and riders ==
A total of 21 teams were invited to participate in the 2009 Jelajah Malaysia. Out of 122 riders, a total of 97 riders made it to the finish in Kuala Lumpur.

Tabriz Petrochemical Team

- (Kazakhstan) Andrey Mizurov
- (Iran) Ghader Mizbani
- (Iran) Hossein Askari
- (Iran) Mehdi Sohrabi
- (Iran) Samad Pourseyedi
- (Iran) Hossein Jahanbanian

Jelly Belly Cycling Team

- (Australia) Matthew Rice
- (United States) Bernard Van Ulden
- (United States) Kel Reijnen
- (United States) Charles Huff
- (United States) Matthew Crane
- (Canada) Will Routley

LeTua Cycling Team

- (Malaysia) Ng Yong Li
- (Malaysia) Mohd Razif Mohd Salleh
- (Singapore) Low Ji Wen
- (Indonesia) Tonton Susanto
- (Indonesia) Samai Samai
- (New Zealand) Jeremy Yates

Trek–Marco Polo

- (Malaysia) Ahmad Haidar Anuawar
- (Malaysia) Loh Sea Keong
- (Japan) Genta Nakamura
- (United Kingdom) James Spragg
- (Netherlands) Eric Van de Meent
- (China) Xing Yandong

Savings & Loans Cycling Team

- (Australia) Jai Crawford
- (Australia) David Pell
- (Australia) Timothy Roe
- (Australia) Steve Robb
- (Australia) Will Dickeson
- (Australia) Joel Pearson

Giant Asia Racing Team

- (Taiwan) Lai Kuan-Hua
- (Taiwan) Peng Kuei-Hsiang
- (Taiwan) Chiang Chun-Te
- (Taiwan) Huang Yen-Lin
- (Taiwan) Chang Wei-Yi

Polygon Sweet Nice

- (Russia) Serguei Kudentsov
- (Indonesia) Hari Fitrianto
- (Indonesia) Herwin Jaya
- (Russia) Artemiy Timofeev
- (Kazakhstan) Artyom Golovaschenko
- (Kazakhstan) Kiril Kavantsev

Shimano Racing Team

- (Japan) Shinri Suzuki
- (Japan) Hidenori Nodera
- (Japan) Tomoya Kano
- (Japan) Yusuke Hatanaka
- (Japan) Yoshinori Iino
- (Japan) Suzuki Yuzuru

Azad University Iran

- (Iran) Amir Zargari
- (Iran) Abbas Saeiditanha
- (Iran) Hossein Nateghi
- (Kyrgyzstan) Evgeny Vakker
- (Malaysia) Anuar Manan
- (Iran) Hamid Shiriseysan

Malaysian Armed Forces Cycling Team

- (Malaysia) Mohd Nor Rizuan Zainal
- (Malaysia) Mohamed Zamri Salleh
- (Malaysia) Mohd Shafrul Afiza Fauzian
- (Malaysia) Muhamad Hazwan Azeman
- (Malaysia) Amirul Aswandi Imran
- (Malaysia) Mohd Fadhli Anwar Fauzi

Malaysia

- (Malaysia) Suhardi Hassan
- (Malaysia) Mohd Faris Abdul Razak
- (Malaysia) Muhammad Fauzan Ahmad Lutfi
- (Malaysia) Muhamad Rauf Nur Misbah
- (Malaysia) Ahmad Fallanie Ali
- (Malaysia) Wan Mohd Najmee Wan Mohd

Thailand

- (Thailand) Prajak Mahawong
- (Thailand) Jatupoom Lekawat
- (Thailand) Phanupan Koolrungrueangkit
- (Thailand) Thurakit Boonratanathanakorn
- (Thailand) Nattaphon Jeebtahwora
- (Thailand) Phucong Sai-Udomsin

Terengganu Toshiba Bike Labz

- (Malaysia) Mohd Jasmin Roslan
- (Malaysia) Mohamed Harrif Salleh
- (Malaysia) Mohd Saiful Anuar Aziz
- (Malaysia) Mohd Nur Umardi Rosli
- (Malaysia) Mohd Saufi Mat Senan
- (Malaysia) Mohd Shahrul Mat Amin
- (Malaysia) Iman Firdaus Nasiruddin

Indonesia

- (Indonesia) Parno
- (Indonesia) Edi Purnomo
- (Indonesia) Iwan Setyawan
- (Indonesia) Heksa Priya Prasetya
- (Indonesia) Rastra Patria

Doha Cycling Team

- (Algeria) Ezzedine Lagab
- (Algeria) Farid Belhani
- (Tunisia) Aymen Ben Hassine
- (Tunisia) Rafaâ Chtioui
- (Algeria) Abdelmalek Madani
- (Syria) Fadi Shekhoni

Aisan Racing Team

- (Japan) Takaeaki Ayabe
- (Japan) Kenichi Suzuki
- (Japan) Takumi Beppu
- (Japan) Taiji Nishitani
- (Japan) Masahiro Shinagawa
- (Japan) Kazuhiro Mori

Bridgestone–Anchor

- (Japan) Makoto Iijima
- (Japan) Masamichi Yamamoto
- (Japan) Masaru Fukuhara
- (Japan) Sho Aikawa
- (Japan) Shinpei Fukuda
- (Japan) Yoshiaki Shimada

Tinelli Colossi Cycling Team

- (Romania) Lars Pria
- (Australia) Brad Hall
- (New Zealand) David Ayre
- (New Zealand) Nathan Dahlberg
- (New Zealand) Michael Naylor
- (Australia) James Langedyk

Team Jazysports Beacon Philippines

- (Philippines) Renato Sambrano
- (Philippines) Ericson Obosa
- (Philippines) Emelito Atilano
- (Philippines) Irish Valenzuela
- (Philippines) Sherwin Carrera
- (Philippines) Merculio Ramos Jr.

MNCF Continental Team

- (Malaysia) Mohammad Akmal Amrun
- (Malaysia) Amir Rusli
- (Malaysia) Thum Weng Kin
- (Malaysia) Muhamad Firdaus Daud
- (Malaysia) Sarham Miswan
- (Malaysia) Muhammad Zamani Mustarudin

Ride Sport Racing

- (Australia) Kris Koke
- (Australia) Deon Locke
- (New Zealand) Scott Lyttle
- (Republic of Ireland) David McCann
- (Australia) Shaun McCarthy
- (Australia) Trent Stevenson
