= 2011 Jelajah Malaysia =

2010–11 UCI Asia Tour

Race details
- Dates: 8–13 March 2011
- Stages: 6
- Distance: 1,011 km (628 mi)
- Winning time: 23h 07' 31"

Results
Jersey awarded to the overall winner	Winner	Mehdi Sohrabi (IRI)	(Tabriz Petrochemical Team)
	Second	David McCann (IRL)	(Giant Kenda Cycling Team)
	Third	Ioannis Tamouridis (GRE)	(SP Tableware)
Jersey awarded to the points classification winner	Points	Mohamed Harrif Salleh (MAS)	(Terengganu Cycling Team)
Jersey awarded to the mountains classification winner	Mountains	Adiq Husainie Othman (MAS)	(Malaysia)
	Team	Tabriz Petrochemical Team	

The 2011 Jelajah Malaysia, a cycling stage race that took place in Malaysia. It was held from 8 to 13 March 2011. There were six stages with a total of 1,011 kilometres. In fact, the race was sanctioned by the Union Cycliste Internationale as a 2.2 category race and was part of the 2010–11 UCI Asia Tour calendar.

Mehdi Sohrabi of Iran won the race, followed by David McCann of Ireland second and Ioannis Tamouridis of Greece third overall. Mohamed Harrif Salleh of Malaysia won the points classification and Adiq Husainie Othman of Malaysia won the mountains classification. Tabriz Petrochemical Team won the team classification.

== Stages ==
Stage	Date	Course	Distance	Stage result		
Stage	Date	Course	Distance	Winner	Second	Third
1	8 March	Kota Iskandar to Bandar Penawar	166.1 km (103.2 mi)	Mehdi Sohrabi (IRI)	Mart Ojavee (EST)	Mohamed Harrif Salleh (MAS)
2	9 March	Bandar Penawar to Kluang	193.9 km (120.5 mi)	Félix Vidal Celis Zabala (ESP)	Anuar Manan (MAS)	Mohamed Harrif Salleh (MAS)
3	10 March	Kluang to Kuala Rompin	163.8 km (101.8 mi)	Ioannis Tamouridis (GRE)	Mohamed Harrif Salleh (MAS)	Anuar Manan (MAS)
4	11 March	Kuala Rompin to Pekan	89.5 km (55.6 mi)	Anuar Manan (MAS)	Hossein Nateghi (IRI)	Boris Sphilevsky (RUS)
5	12 March	Pekan to Bentong	222.5 km (138.3 mi)	Félix Vidal Celis Zabala (ESP)	David Kopp (GER)	Kazuhiro Mori (JPN)
6	13 March	Batu Caves to Nilai	175.2 km (108.9 mi)	Mehdi Sohrabi (IRI)	David McCann (IRL)	Ioannis Tamouridis (GRE)

== Classification leadership ==
Stage	Stage winner	General classification	Points classification	Mountains classification	Asian rider classification	Team classification	Asian team classification
1	Mehdi Sohrabi	Mehdi Sohrabi	Mohamed Harrif Salleh	Mark John Lexer Galedo	Mehdi Sohrabi	Tabriz Petrochemical Team	Tabriz Petrochemical Team
2	Félix Vidal Celis Zabala	Mehdi Sohrabi	Mohamed Harrif Salleh	Daniel Westmattelmann	Mehdi Sohrabi	Tabriz Petrochemical Team	Tabriz Petrochemical Team
3	Ioannis Tamouridis	Mohamed Harrif Salleh	Mohamed Harrif Salleh	Kenichi Suzuki	Mohamed Harrif Salleh	Tabriz Petrochemical Team	Tabriz Petrochemical Team
4	Anuar Manan	Anuar Manan	Mohamed Harrif Salleh	Kenichi Suzuki	Anuar Manan	Tabriz Petrochemical Team	Tabriz Petrochemical Team
5	Félix Vidal Celis Zabala	Félix Vidal Celis Zabala	Mohamed Harrif Salleh	Kenichi Suzuki	Mehdi Sohrabi	Tabriz Petrochemical Team	Tabriz Petrochemical Team
6	Mehdi Sohrabi	Mehdi Sohrabi	Mohamed Harrif Salleh	Adiq Husainie Othman	Mehdi Sohrabi	Tabriz Petrochemical Team	Tabriz Petrochemical Team
Final		Mehdi Sohrabi	Mohamed Harrif Salleh	Adiq Husainie Othman	Mehdi Sohrabi	Tabriz Petrochemical Team	Tabriz Petrochemical Team

== Final standings ==
=== General classification ===
	Rider	Team	Time
1	(Iran) Mehdi Sohrabi	Tabriz Petrochemical Team	23h 07' 31"
2	(Republic of Ireland) David McCann	Giant Kenda Cycling Team	+ 29"
3	(Greece) Ioannis Tamouridis	SP Tableware	+ 1' 40"
4	(Germany) David Kopp	Team Eddy Merckx-Indeland	+ 1' 53"
5	(Spain) Félix Vidal Celis Zabala	LeTua Cycling Team	+ 3' 43"
6	(Japan) Kazuhiro Mori	Aisan Racing Team	+ 3' 58"
7	(Uzbekistan) Muradjan Khalmuratov	Uzbekistan	+ 3' 58"
8	(Austria) Markus Eibegger	Tabriz Petrochemical Team	+ 3' 59"
9	(United States) Jesse Anthony	Kelly Benefit Strategies–OptumHealth	+ 3' 59"
10	(Malaysia) Amir Rusli	Royal Malaysia Police	+ 4' 01"

=== Points classification ===
	Rider	Team	Points
1	(Malaysia) Mohamed Harrif Salleh	Terengganu Cycling Team	66
2	(Greece) Ioannis Tamouridis	SP Tableware	65
3	(Malaysia) Anuar Manan	Terengganu Cycling Team	62
4	(Germany) David Kopp	Team Eddy Merckx-Indeland	56
5	(Iran) Mehdi Sohrabi	Tabriz Petrochemical Team	48
6	(Spain) Félix Vidal Celis Zabala	LeTua Cycling Team	41
7	(Japan) Kazuhiro Mori	Aisan Racing Team	40
8	(New Zealand) Rico Rogers	Giant Kenda Cycling Team	39
9	(Iran) Hossein Nateghi	Vali ASR Kerman Cycling Team	34
10	(Australia) Steele Von Hoff	Genesys Wealth Advisers	31

=== Mountains classification ===
	Rider	Team	Points
1	(Malaysia) Adiq Husainie Othman	Malaysia	12
2	(Philippines) Mark John Lexer Galedo	7 Eleven Racing Team By RoadBike Philippines	9
3	(Japan) Kenichi Suzuki	Aisan Racing Team	8
4	(Japan) Kazuhiro Mori	Aisan Racing Team	6
5	(United States) Jesse Anthony	Kelly Benefit Strategies–OptumHealth	6
6	(Germany) Daniel Westmattelmann	Team Eddy Merckx-Indeland	6
7	(Malaysia) Mohamed Zamri Salleh	Malaysian Armed Forces	4
8	(Japan) Shinpei Fukuda	Aisan Racing Team	3
9	(Iran) Hossein Askari	Tabriz Petrochemical Team	2
10	(Australia) Patrick Shaw	Genesys Wealth Advisers	2

=== Team classification ===
	Team	Time
1	Tabriz Petrochemical Team	69h 31' 05"
2	Giant Kenda Cycling Team	+ 11"
3	Team Eddy Merckx-Indeland	+ 1' 37"
4	Maramnde 47-F2P	+ 3' 40"
5	SP Tableware	+ 4' 07"
6	Kelly Benefit Strategies–OptumHealth	+ 5' 38"
7	Uzbekistan	+ 5' 40"
8	Aisan Racing Team	+ 5' 43"
9	LeTua Cycling Team	+ 5' 43"
10	Customs Cycling Club	+ 8' 44"

=== Asian rider classification ===
	Rider	Team	Time
1	(Iran) Mehdi Sohrabi	Tabriz Petrochemical Team	23h 07' 31"
2	(Japan) Kazuhiro Mori	Aisan Racing Team	+ 3' 58"
3	(Uzbekistan) Muradjan Khalmuratov	Uzbekistan	+ 3' 58"
4	(Malaysia) Amir Rusli	Royal Malaysia Police	+ 4' 01"
5	(Philippines) Toots Oledan	7 Eleven Racing Team By RoadBike Philippines	+ 4' 01"
6	(Iran) Moezeddin Seyed-Rezaei	Vali ASR Kerman Cycling Team	+ 4' 02"
7	(Indonesia) Iwan Setiawan	Customs Cycling Club	+ 4' 03"
8	(Indonesia) Bambang Suriyadi	Polygon Sweet Nice	+ 4' 04"
9	(Kyrgyzstan) Evgeny Vakker	LeTua Cycling Team	+ 4' 04"
10	(Iran) Hossein Askari	Tabriz Petrochemical Team	+ 4' 04"

=== Asian team classification ===
	Team	Time
1	Tabriz Petrochemical Team	69h 31' 10"
2	Uzbekistan	+ 5' 35"
3	Aisan Racing Team	+ 5' 38"
4	Customs Cycling Club	+ 8' 39"
5	Polygon Sweet Nice	+ 14' 01"
6	7 Eleven Racing Team By RoadBike Philippines	+ 14' 01"
7	Terengganu Cycling Team	+ 19' 42"
8	LeTua Cycling Team	+ 21' 45"
9	Vali ASR Kerman Cycling Team	+ 22' 25"
10	Malaysia	+ 28' 05"

=== Malaysian rider classification ===
	Rider	Team	Time
1	(Malaysia) Amir Rusli	Royal Malaysia Police	23h 11' 32"
2	(Malaysia) Mohd Shahrul Mat Amin	Terengganu Cycling Team	+ 3"
3	(Malaysia) Yusrizal Usoff	Terengganu Cycling Team	+ 2' 06"
4	(Malaysia) Loh Sea Keong	Kuala Lumpur	+ 2' 16"
5	(Malaysia) Khairul Naim Azhar	Sabah	+ 4' 43"
6	(Malaysia) Mohd Faris Abdul Razak	Royal Malaysia Police	+ 8' 26"
7	(Malaysia) Wan Mohd Najmee Wan Mohamad	Kuala Lumpur	+ 8' 26"
8	(Malaysia) Gan Hock Seng	Pusat Sukan Tumpuan Berbasikal KPT-UTEM Cycling Team	+ 8' 26"
9	(Malaysia) Mohd Sayuti Mohd Zahit	Pusat Sukan Tumpuan Berbasikal KPT-UTEM Cycling Team	+ 8' 26"
10	(Malaysia) Adiq Husainie Othman	Malaysia	+ 15' 02"

=== Malaysian team classification ===
	Team	Time
1	Terengganu Cycling Team	69h 52' 55"
2	Malaysia	+ 6' 20"
3	Royal Malaysia Police	+ 6' 20"
4	Kuala Lumpur	+ 6' 20"
5	Pusat Sukan Tumpuan Berbasikal KPT-UTEM Cycling Team	+ 14' 43"
6	Negeri Sembilan	+ 30' 11"
7	Malaysian Armed Forces	+ 32' 05"

== Stage results ==
=== Stage 1 ===
8 March 2011 — Kota Iskandar to Bandar Penawar, 166.1 km (103.2 mi)

	Rider	Team	Time
1	(Iran) Mehdi Sohrabi	Tabriz Petrochemical Team	3h 39' 34"
2	(Estonia) Mart Ojavee	Champion System	+ 2"
3	(Malaysia) Mohamed Harrif Salleh	Terengganu Cycling Team	+ 4"
4	(Australia) Steele Von Hoff	Genesys Wealth Advisers	+ 4"
5	(Russia) Serguei Kudentsov	Polygon Sweet Nice	+ 4"
6	(Russia) Boris Shpilevsky	Tabriz Petrochemical Team	+ 4"
7	(Greece) Ioannis Tamouridis	SP Tableware	+ 4"
8	(Iran) Hossein Nateghi	Vali ASR Kerman Cycling Team	+ 4"
9	(New Zealand) Rico Rogers	Giant Kenda Cycling Team	+ 4"
10	(Malaysia) Anuar Manan	Terengganu Cycling Team	+ 4"

=== Stage 2 ===
9 March 2011 — Bandar Penawar to Kluang, 193.9 km (120.5 mi)

	Rider	Team	Time
1	(Spain) Félix Vidal Celis Zabala	LeTua Cycling Team	4h 53' 14"
2	(Malaysia) Anuar Manan	Terengganu Cycling Team	+ 0"
3	(Malaysia) Mohamed Harrif Salleh	Terengganu Cycling Team	+ 0"
4	(Greece) Ioannis Tamouridis	SP Tableware	+ 0"
5	(Malaysia) Ahmad Fakhrullah Alias	Malaysia	+ 0"
6	(Japan) Kazuhiro Mori	Aisan Racing Team	+ 0"
7	(New Zealand) Rico Rogers	Giant Kenda Cycling Team	+ 0"
8	(Germany) David Kopp	Team Eddy Merckx-Indeland	+ 0"
9	(France) Sylvain Pandele	Maramnde 47-F2P	+ 0"
10	(Estonia) Jaan Kirsipuu	Champion System	+ 0"

=== Stage 3 ===
10 March 2011 — Kluang to Kuala Rompin, 163.8 km (101.8 mi)

	Rider	Team	Time
1	(Greece) Ioannis Tamouridis	SP Tableware	3h 29' 54"
2	(Malaysia) Mohamed Harrif Salleh	Terengganu Cycling Team	+ 0"
3	(Malaysia) Anuar Manan	Terengganu Cycling Team	+ 0"
4	(New Zealand) Rico Rogers	Giant Kenda Cycling Team	+ 0"
5	(Japan) Takeaki Ayabe	Aisan Racing Team	+ 0"
6	(Germany) Matthias Friedemann	Champion System	+ 0"
7	(Germany) David Kopp	Team Eddy Merckx-Indeland	+ 0"
8	(Iran) Hossein Nateghi	Vali ASR Kerman Cycling Team	+ 0"
9	(France) Sylvain Pandele	Maramnde 47-F2P	+ 0"
10	(Australia) Steele Von Hoff	Genesys Wealth Advisers	+ 0"

=== Stage 4 ===
11 March 2011 — Kuala Rompin to Pekan, 89.5 km (55.6 mi)

	Rider	Team	Time
1	(Malaysia) Anuar Manan	Terengganu Cycling Team	1h 52' 24"
2	(Iran) Hossein Nateghi	Vali ASR Kerman Cycling Team	+ 0"
3	(Russia) Boris Shpilevsky	Tabriz Petrochemical Team	+ 0"
4	(Malaysia) Mohamed Harrif Salleh	Terengganu Cycling Team	+ 0"
5	(New Zealand) Rico Rogers	Giant Kenda Cycling Team	+ 0"
6	(Japan) Kazuhiro Mori	Aisan Racing Team	+ 0"
7	(Germany) Matthias Friedemann	Champion System	+ 0"
8	(Spain) Félix Vidal Celis Zabala	LeTua Cycling Team	+ 0"
9	(Australia) Steele Van Hoff	Genesys Wealth Advisers	+ 0"
10	(Japan) Yasuharu Nakajima	Aisan Racing Team	+ 0"

=== Stage 5 ===
12 March 2011 — Pekan to Bentong, 222.5 km (138.3 mi)

	Rider	Team	Time
1	(Spain) Félix Vidal Celis Zabala	LeTua Cycling Team	5h 13' 10"
2	(Germany) David Kopp	Team Eddy Merckx-Indeland	+ 0"
3	(Japan) Kazuhiro Mori	Aisan Racing Team	+ 0"
4	(Austria) Markus Eibegger	Tabriz Petrochemical Team	+ 0"
5	(Republic of Ireland) David McCann	Giant Kenda Cycling Team	+ 0"
6	(Malaysia) Mohd Shahrul Mat Amin	Terengganu Cycling Team	+ 0"
7	(Philippines) Toots Oledan	7 Eleven Racing Team By RoadBike Philippines	+ 0"
8	(Greece) Ioannis Tamouridis	SP Tableware	+ 0"
9	(Uzbekistan) Muradjan Khalmuratov	Uzbekistan	+ 0"
10	(Japan) Shinpei Fukuda	Aisan Racing Team	+ 0"

=== Stage 6 ===
8 March 2011 — Batu Caves to Nilai, 175.2 km (108.9 mi)

	Rider	Team	Time
1	(Iran) Mehdi Sohrabi	Tabriz Petrochemical Team	3h 59' 44"
2	(Republic of Ireland) David McCann	Giant Kenda Cycling Team	+ 2"
3	(Greece) Ioannis Tamouridis	SP Tableware	+ 1' 26"
4	(Germany) David Kopp	Team Eddy Merckx-Indeland	+ 1' 31"
5	(United States) Jesse Anthony	Kelly Benefit Strategies–OptumHealth	+ 3' 26"
6	(Austria) Markus Eibegger	Tabriz Petrochemical Team	+ 3' 26"
7	(Uzbekistan) Muradjan Khalmuratov	Uzbekistan	+ 3' 28"
8	(Germany) Matthias Friedemann	Champion System	+ 3' 28"
9	(Germany) Alexander Schmitt	Team Eddy Merckx-Indeland	+ 3' 28"
10	(Australia) Steele Von Hoff	Genesys Wealth Advisers	+ 3' 31"

== List of teams and riders ==
A total of 28 teams were invited to participate in the 2011 Jelajah Malaysia. Out of 171 riders, a total of 109 riders made it to the finish in Nilai.

Giant Kenda Cycling Team

- (Republic of Ireland) David McCann
- (New Zealand) Rico Rogers
- (Australia) Jai Crawford
- (United Kingdom) Alex Coutts
- (Republic of Ireland) Ryan Sherlock

Aisan Racing Team

- (Japan) Takeaki Ayabe
- (Japan) Kenichi Suzuki
- (Japan) Masahiro Shinagawa
- (Japan) Kazuhiro Mori
- (Japan) Yasuharu Nakajima
- (Japan) Shinpei Fukuda

Champion System

- (Hong Kong) Chau Dor Ming
- (Austria) Clemens Fankhauser
- (Germany) Matthias Friedemann
- (Estonia) Jaan Kirsipuu
- (Estonia) Mart Ojavee
- (Australia) Christopher Williams

Genesys Wealth Advisers

- (Australia) Jonathan Lovelock
- (Australia) Patrick Shaw
- (Australia) Anthony Giacoppo
- (Australia) Steele Von Hoff
- (Australia) Nathan Haas
- (Australia) Nathan Earle

Holy Brother Cycling Team

- (China) Man Jianren
- (China) Li Chao
- (China) Wei Baoxin
- (China) Zhao Yiming
- (China) Jin Long
- (China) Xu Junheng

Kelly Benefit Strategies–OptumHealth

- (United States) Jesse Anthony
- (Canada) Marsh Cooper
- (United States) Michael Creed
- (United States) Jason Donald
- (United States) Daniel Holloway
- (United States) Reid Mumford

LeTua Cycling Team

- (Malaysia) Ng Yong Li
- (Malaysia) Mohd Hafiz Rozli
- (Malaysia) Mohd Shawal Mohd Shafee
- (Kyrgyzstan) Evgeny Vakker
- (Spain) Félix Vidal Celis Zabala
- (Australia) Sam Witmitz

Tabriz Petrochemical Team

- (Iran) Ghader Mizbani
- (Iran) Hossein Askari
- (Iran) Mehdi Sohrabi
- (Austria) Markus Eibegger
- (Iran) Behnam Khalilikhosroshahi
- (Russia) Boris Shpilevsky

Team Eddy Merckx-Indeland

- (Germany) Stefan Ganser
- (Germany) Dirk Finders
- (Germany) Alexander Schmitt
- (Germany) Daniel Westmattelmann
- (Netherlands) Luc Hagenaars
- (Germany) David Kopp

SP Tableware

- (Greece) Ioannis Tamouridis
- (Germany) Christoph Springer
- (Australia) Mark O'Brien
- (Greece) Periklis Ilias
- (France) Guillaume Pont

Terengganu Cycling Team

- (Malaysia) Yusrizal Usoff
- (Malaysia) Anuar Manan
- (Japan) Motoi Nara
- (Malaysia) Mohamed Harrif Salleh
- (Malaysia) Mohd Shahrul Mat Amin
- (Malaysia) Mohd Saufi Mat Senan

Vali ASR Kerman Team

- (Iran) Jalil Eslami
- (Iran) Mohammad Zangi Abadi
- (Iran) Moezeddin Seyed-Rezaei
- (Iran) Saeed Nateghi
- (Iran) Amin Eslampour
- (Iran) Hossein Nateghi

Brunei

- (Brunei) Muhammad Halid Sata
- (Brunei) Reduan Yusop
- (Brunei) Azmi Abd Hadzid
- (Brunei) Muhammad Nurhaimin Awang
- (Brunei) Faizal Ahmad
- (Brunei) Arbe Shadatul Farrani

Malaysia

- (Malaysia) Ahmad Fakhrullah Alias
- (Malaysia) Mohamad Akmal Amrun
- (Malaysia) Adiq Husainie Othman
- (Malaysia) Sarham Miswan
- (Malaysia) Mohd Zulhilmie Afif Ahmad Zamri
- (Malaysia) Mohd Al-Ghazali Abd. Hamid

Thailand

- (Thailand) Sarawut Sirironnachai
- (Thailand) Nawuti Lihongyu
- (Thailand) Thurakit Boonratanathanakorn
- (Thailand) Nattapon Jeebthaworn
- (Thailand) Okart Bualoi
- (Thailand) Jakapan Ruanpae

Uzbekistan

- (Uzbekistan) Muradjan Khalmuratov
- (Uzbekistan) Vadim Shaekhov
- (Uzbekistan) Yusup Abrekov
- (Uzbekistan) Abdullojon Akparov
- (Uzbekistan) Vladimir Tuychiev
- (Uzbekistan) Gleb Gorbachev

7 Eleven Racing Team By RoadBike Philippines

- (Philippines) Lloyd Lucien Reynante
- (Philippines) Tomaz Matinez
- (Philippines) Ericson Obosa
- (Philippines) Mark John Lexer Galedo
- (Philippines) Irish Valenzuela
- (Philippines) Toots Oledan

FELDA-T Cycling Team

- (Malaysia) Khairul Anuar Ibrahim
- (Malaysia) Muhamad Harif Muralis
- (Malaysia) Muhammad Zulhilmie Ahmad Zamri
- (Malaysia) Mohd Syairazy Mohamad Puad
- (Malaysia) Mohd Fahmi Irfan Mohd Zailani
- (Malaysia) Muhamad Khairul Azizi Abdullah

Johor

- (Malaysia) Mohd Firdaus Daud
- (Malaysia) Mohd Fakhruddin Daud
- (Malaysia) Muhamad Rizal Muhamad
- (Malaysia) Mohd Shahelmie Abd Karim
- (Malaysia) Matthew Chong Soon Leong
- (Malaysia) Shaiful Ahmad

Malaysian Armed Forces

- (Malaysia) Mohd Nur Rizuan Zainal
- (Malaysia) Mohamed Zamri Salleh
- (Malaysia) Mohd Shahrul Afiza Fauizan
- (Malaysia) Mohd Fadhli Anwar Mohd Fauzi
- (Malaysia) Mohd Shahrul Nizam Che Shamsudin
- (Malaysia) Mohd Hazwan Azeman

Maramnde 47-F2P Team

- (France) Jean Mespoulede
- (France) Maxime Martin
- (France) Jonathan Mouchel
- (France) Sylvain Pandele
- (France) Florent Sentuco
- (France) Yohan Baudrit

Negeri Sembilan

- (Malaysia) Mohamad Fairet Rusli
- (Malaysia) Amirul Anuar Jefri
- (Malaysia) Mohd Ekbar Zamanhuri
- (Malaysia) Abdul Rashid Ibrahim
- (Malaysia) Wan Shazwan Afiq Wan Shahril Anuar
- (Malaysia) Mohd Nurshafiq Suhaimi

OCBC Singapore Continental Cycling Team

- (Singapore) Ang Kee Meng
- (Singapore) Ho Jun Rong
- (Singapore) Calvin Sim
- (Singapore) Marcus Leong
- (Singapore) Junaidi Hashim
- (Singapore) Adi Putera Yusoff

Pahang

- (Malaysia) Mohamad Aim Mohamad Fauzi
- (Malaysia) Mohd Yazrul Hisham Zulkifli
- (Malaysia) Mohd Saifullah Jamal Alias
- (Malaysia) Wan Ahmad Zarif Wan Abdul Halim
- (Malaysia) Mohamad Faris Moher Affendy
- (Malaysia) Muhamad Ayub Mohd Radzi

Royal Malaysia Police

- (Malaysia) Amir Rusli
- (Malaysia) Mohd Fauzan Ahmad Lutfi
- (Malaysia) Salahuddin Mat Saman
- (Malaysia) Mohd Faris Abdul Razak
- (Malaysia) Nik Mohd Azwan Zulfikle
- (Malaysia) Ahmad Huzairi Abu Bakar

Polygon Sweet Nice

- (Indonesia) Herwin Jaya
- (Indonesia) Jimmy Pranata
- (Indonesia) Antonius Christopher Tjondrokusumo
- (Indonesia) Dani Lesmana
- (Indonesia) Bambang Suriyadi
- (Russia) Serguei Kudentsov

Pusat Sukan Tumpuan Berbasikal KPT-UTEM Cycling Team

- (Malaysia) Gan Hock Seng
- (Malaysia) Muhammad Amin Amiruddin
- (Malaysia) Mohd Sayuti Mohd Zahit
- (Malaysia) Amirrudin Jamaluddin
- (Malaysia) Mohammad Zaki Ramlee
- (Malaysia) Mohammad Amirul Mohamed Ali

Sabah

- (Malaysia) Raijesy Ryner R. Anang
- (Malaysia) Abdul Rahman Abu Hasan
- (Malaysia) Khairul Naim Azhar
- (Malaysia) Shahrizan Selamat

Customs Cycling Club

- (Indonesia) Erik Suprianto
- (Indonesia) Fajar Mulia Ramli
- (Indonesia) Iwan Setiawan
- (Indonesia) Heksa Priya Prasetya
- (Indonesia) Hartono Gunawan
- (Indonesia) Muhamad Nur Fatoni

Kuala Lumpur

- (Malaysia) Suhardi Hassan
- (Malaysia) Ahmad Fallanie Ali
- (Malaysia) Wan Mohd Najmee Wan Mohamad
- (Malaysia) Nazri Mohamad
- (Malaysia) Mohd Shafari Abdul Malik
- (Malaysia) Loh Sea Keong
