= Jelajah Malaysia =

Malaysian multi-day road cycling race

- Logo of the Jelajah Malaysia

Race details
- Date: January (2007–2008); April (2009–2010); March (2011); May (2012); June (2013); December (2014–2015); October (2016–2017)
- Region: Peninsular Malaysia
- English name: Tour of Malaysia
- Local name: Jelajah Malaysia (in Malay)
- Discipline: Road
- Competition: UCI Asia Tour 2.2
- Type: Stage race
- Organiser: Malaysian National Cycling Federation
- Web site: www.jelajahmalaysia.com.my

History
- First edition: 1963
- Editions: 53 (as of 2017)
- Final edition: 2017
- Most wins: Mehdi Sohrabi (IRI) (2 wins)
- Final winner: Brendon Davids (RSA)

The Jelajah Malaysia was an annual professional road bicycle racing stage race held in Malaysia since 1963. The race was part of the UCI Asia Tour and was classified by the International Cycling Union (UCI) as a 2.2 category race. The race consisted of only a men's competition over seven stages.

== History ==
Jelajah Malaysia was the oldest bicycle race in Malaysia and it was ranked 2.2 class by UCI.

It was last organized in 2017, after which the event were cancelled thereafter due to lack of sponsors. As of 2025, the event is not held, although there was an attempt to organize it in 2023 but failed due to lack of funding.

== Past winners ==
=== General classification ===
Year	Country	Rider	Team
1999	Switzerland	Peter Jörg	Switzerland (national team)
2000	Germany	Rafael Chyla	Hohenfelder-Concorde
2001	Ireland	Tommy Evans	Republic of Ireland (national team)
2002	Italy	Simone Mori	Jura Suisse-Nippon Hodo
2003	Japan	Hidenori Nodera	Shimano Racing Team
2004	Malaysia	Suhardi Hassan	Kuala Lumpur
2007	Iran	Mehdi Sohrabi	Iran (national team)
2008	Indonesia	Tonton Susanto	LeTua Cycling Team
2009	Australia	Timothy Roe	Savings & Loans Cycling Team
2010	Ireland	David McCann	Giant Asia Racing Team
2011	Iran	Mehdi Sohrabi	Tabriz Petrochemical Team
2012	Uzbekistan	Yusuf Abrekov	Uzbekistan Suren Team
2013	Malaysia	Loh Sea Keong	OCBC Singapore Continental Cycling Team
2014	Tunisia	Rafaâ Chtioui	Skydive Dubai Pro Cycling
2015	Spain	Francisco Mancebo	Skydive Dubai–Al Ahli
2016	Iran	Arvin Moazzami	Pishgaman–Giant
2017	South Africa	Brendon Davids	Oliver's Real Food

=== Points classification ===
Year	Country	Rider	Team
2007	Malaysia	Anuar Manan	LeTua Cycling Team
2008	Malaysia	Anuar Manan	LeTua Cycling Team
2009	Malaysia	Anuar Manan	Azad University Iran
2010	South Africa	Malcolm Lange	Medscheme Cycling Team
2011	Malaysia	Mohamed Harrif Salleh	Terengganu Cycling Team
2012	Malaysia	Adiq Husainie Othman	Malaysia Development Team
2013	Malaysia	Mohamed Harrif Salleh	Terengganu Cycling Team
2014	Malaysia	Mohamed Harrif Salleh	Terengganu Cycling Team
2015	Italy	Andrea Palini	Skydive Dubai–Al Ahli
2016	South Korea	Park Sung-baek	KSPO
2017	Malaysia	Nur Amirul Fakhruddin Marzuki	Terengganu Cycling Team

=== Mountains classification ===
Year	Country	Rider	Team
2007	Iran	Ghader Mizbani	Giant Asia Racing Team
2008	Iran	Hossein Askari	Tabriz Petrochemical Team
2009	Iran	Abbas Saeiditanha	Azad University Iran
2010	Indonesia	Matnur	Polygon Sweet Nice
2011	Malaysia	Adiq Husainie Othman	Malaysia Development Team
2012	Indonesia	Dadi Suryadi	Putra Perjuangan
2013	Malaysia	Mohamed Zamri Salleh	Terengganu Cycling Team
2014	Indonesia	Dani Lesmana	Pegasus Continental Cycling Team
2015	Malaysia	Nur Amirul Fakhruddin Mazuki	Terengganu Cycling Team
2016	Iran	Amir Kolahdozhagh	Pishgaman–Giant
2017	Colombia	Jahir Pérez	Team Sapura Cycling

=== Asian rider classification ===
Year	Country	Rider	Team
1999	Indonesia	Herry Janto Setiawan	Indonesia (national team)
2003	Japan	Hidenori Nodera	Shimano Racing Team
2004	Malaysia	Suhardi Hassan	Kuala Lumpur
2007	Iran	Mehdi Sohrabi	Iran (national team)
2008	Indonesia	Tonton Susanto	LeTua Cycling Team
2009	Iran	Ghader Mizbani	Tabriz Petrochemical Team
2010	Japan	Takumi Beppu	Aisan Racing Team
2011	Iran	Mehdi Sohrabi	Tabriz Petrochemical Team
2012	Uzbekistan	Yusuf Abrekov	Uzbekistan Suren Team
2013	Malaysia	Loh Sea Keong	OCBC Singapore Continental Cycling Team
2014	Hong Kong	Ho Burr	Hong Kong (national team)
2015	Hong Kong	Cheung King Lok	HKSI Pro Cycling Team
2016	Iran	Arvin Moazzami	Pishgaman–Giant
2017	Philippines	Rustom Lim	7 Eleven Roadbike Philippines

=== Malaysian rider classification ===
Year	Country	Rider	Team
1999	Malaysia	Tsen Seong Hoong	Malaysia (national team)
2004	Malaysia	Suhardi Hassan	Kuala Lumpur
2007	Malaysia	Suhardi Hassan	Kuala Lumpur
2008	Malaysia	Suhardi Hassan	Kuala Lumpur
2009	Malaysia	Muhammad Rauf Nur Misbah	Malaysia (national team)
2010	Malaysia	Amir Rusli	Malaysia (national team)
2011	Malaysia	Amir Rusli	Royal Malaysia Police
2012	Malaysia	Adiq Husainie Othman	Malaysia Development Team
2013	Malaysia	Loh Sea Keong	OCBC Singapore Continental Cycling Team
2014	Malaysia	Muhd Shaiful Anuar Azis	Terengganu Cycling Team
2015	Malaysia	Muhd Shaiful Anuar Azis	Terengganu Cycling Team
2016	Malaysia	Nik Mohamad Azman Zulkifli	Malaysia (national team)
2017	Malaysia	Muhamad Zawawi Azman	Team Sapura Cycling

=== Team classification ===
Year	Based	Team
2007	(Taiwan)	Giant Asia Racing Team
2008	(Iran)	Tabriz Petrochemical Team
2009	(Iran)	Tabriz Petrochemical Team
2010	(Malaysia)	LeTua Cycling Team
2011	(Iran)	Tabriz Petrochemical Team
2012	(Indonesia)	Putra Perjuangan
2013	(Azerbaijan)	Synergy Baku
2014	(United Arab Emirates)	Skydive Dubai Pro Cycling
2015	(United Arab Emirates)	Skydive Dubai–Al Ahli
2016	(Iran)	Pishgaman–Giant
2017	(Malaysia)	Team Sapura Cycling

=== Asian team classification ===
Year	Based	Team
2007	(Taiwan)	Giant Asia Racing Team
2008	(Iran)	Tabriz Petrochemical Team
2009	(Iran)	Tabriz Petrochemical Team
2010	(Malaysia)	LeTua Cycling Team
2011	(Iran)	Tabriz Petrochemical Team
2012	(Indonesia)	Putra Perjuangan
2013	(Japan)	Matrix Powertag
2014	(Indonesia)	Pegasus Continental Cycling Team
2015	(Philippines)	Team 7 Eleven Road Bike Philippines
2016	(Iran)	Pishgaman–Giant
2017	(Malaysia)	Team Sapura Cycling

=== Malaysian team classification ===
Year	Based	Team
2007	(Malaysia)	LeTua Cycling Team
2008	(Malaysia)	LeTua Cycling Team
2009	(Malaysia)	LeTua Cycling Team
2010	(Malaysia)	LeTua Cycling Team
2011	(Malaysia)	Terengganu Cycling Team
2012	(Malaysia)	Terengganu Cycling Team
2013	(Malaysia)	Polis Diraja Malaysia
2014	(Malaysia)	Terengganu Cycling Team
2015	(Malaysia)	Terengganu Cycling Team
2016	(Malaysia)	Malaysia (national team)
2017	(Malaysia)	Team Sapura Cycling
