= 2007–08 UCI Asia Tour =

Cycling competition

- Fourth edition of the UCI Asia Tour

Details
- Dates: 28 October 2007–15 September 2008
- Location: Asia
- Races: 26

Champions
- Individual champion: Hossein Askari (IRI) (Tabriz Petrochemical Team)
- Teams' champion: Tabriz Petrochemical Team
- Nations' champion: Japan

The 2007–08 UCI Asia Tour was the 4th season of the UCI Asia Tour. The season began on 28 October 2007 with the Japan Cup and ended on 15 September 2008 with the Tour de Hokkaido.

The points leader, based on the cumulative results of previous races, wears the UCI Asia Tour cycling jersey. Hossein Askari from Iran was the defending champion of the 2006–07 UCI Asia Tour and was crowned as the 2007–08 UCI Asia Tour champion.

Throughout the season, points are awarded to the top finishers of stages within stage races and the final general classification standings of each of the stages races and one-day events. The quality and complexity of a race also determines how many points are awarded to the top finishers, the higher the UCI rating of a race, the more points are awarded.

The UCI ratings from highest to lowest are as follows:

- Multi-day events: 2.HC, 2.1 and 2.2
- One-day events: 1.HC, 1.1 and 1.2

== Events ==
=== 2007 ===
Date	Race name	Location	UCI Rating	Winner	Team
28 October	Japan Cup	Japan	1.1	Manuele Mori (ITA)	Saunier Duval–Prodir
3–10 November	Tour of Hainan	China	2.1	Robert Radosz (POL)	Intel–Action
11 November	Tour de Okinawa	Japan	1.2	Takashi Miyazawa (JPN)	Nippo Corporation-Meitan Honpo co. Ltd-Asada
16–21 December	Tour of Thailand	Thailand	2.2	Ahad Kazemi (IRI)	Tabriz Petrochemical Team
23–30 December	Tour of South China Sea	China; Hong Kong; Macau	2.2	Tang Wang Yip (HKG)	Hong Kong Pro Cycling

=== 2008 ===
Date	Race name	Location	UCI Rating	Winner	Team
7–13 January	Jelajah Malaysia	Malaysia	2.2	Tonton Susanto (INA)	LeTua Cycling Team
26 January	H. H. Vice President Cup	United Arab Emirates	1.2	Badr Mohamed Mirza Bani Hammad (UAE)	Doha Team
27 January–1 February	Tour of Qatar	Qatar	2.1	Tom Boonen (BEL)	Quick-Step
9–17 February	Tour de Langkawi	Malaysia	2.HC	Ruslan Ivanov (MDA)	Diquigiovanni–Androni
21–24 February	UAQ International Race	United Arab Emirates	2.2	Hossein Askari (IRI)	Tabriz Petrochemical Team
2–7 March	Taftan Tour	Iran	2.2	Hossein Nateghi (IRI)	Tabriz Petrochemical Team
9–16 March	Tour de Taiwan	Taiwan	2.2	John Murphy (USA)	Health Net–Maxxis
2–6 April	Tour de East Java	Indonesia	2.2	Ghader Mizbani (IRI)	Tabriz Petrochemical Team
15 April	Asian Cycling Championships – Time trial	Japan	CC	Eugen Wacker (KGZ)	Kyrgyzstan (national team)
17 April	Asian Cycling Championships – Road race	Japan	CC	Fumiyuki Beppu (JPN)	Japan (national team)
9–11 May	Tour de Kumano	Japan	2.2	Miyataka Shimizu (JPN)	Meitan Hompo-GDR
9–13 May	President Tour of Iran	Iran	2.2	Ahad Kazemi (IRI)	Tabriz Petrochemical Team
18–25 May	Tour of Japan	Japan	2.2	Cameron Meyer (AUS)	Southaustralia.com–AIS
21–29 May	Azerbaïjan Tour	Iran	2.2	Hossein Askari (IRI)	Tabriz Petrochemical Team
21 June–4 July	Tour de Korea-Japan	South Korea; Japan	2.2	Sergey Lagutin (UZB)	Cycle Collstrop
11–20 July	Tour of Qinghai Lake	China	2.HC	Tyler Hamilton (USA)	Rock Racing
13–22 July	Way to Pekin	Russia	2.2	Sergey Firsanov (RUS)	Rietumu Banka–Riga
19–20 July	His Excellency Gabenor of Malacca Cup	Malaysia	2.2	Mehdi Sohrabi (IRI)	Islamic Azad University Cycling Team
23–25 July	Jelajah Negeri Sembilan	Malaysia	2.2	Vadim Shaekhov (UZB)	Uzbekistan (national team)
1–6 September	Tour of Thailand The Northern Adventure	Thailand	2.2	Alex Coutts (GBR)	Giant Asia Racing Team
11–15 September	Tour de Hokkaido	Japan	2.2	Takashi Miyazawa (JPN)	Meitan Hompo-GDR

== Final standings ==
=== Individual classification ===
Rank	Name	Team	Points
1.	Hossein Askari (IRI)	Tabriz Petrochemical Team	240.66
2.	Ghader Mizbani (IRI)	Tabriz Petrochemical Team	205.66
3.	Hossein Nateghi (IRI)	Tabriz Petrochemical Team	204
4.	Mehdi Sohrabi (IRI)	Islamic Azad University Cycling Team	195
5.	Takashi Miyazawa (JPN)	Meitan Hompo-GDR	192
6.	Ahad Kazemi (IRI)	Tabriz Petrochemical Team	175.66
7.	Robert Radosz (POL)		163
8.	Tyler Hamilton (USA)	Rock Racing	154
9.	Taiji Nishitani (JPN)	Aisan Racing Team	132
10.	Sergey Lagutin (UZB)	Cycle Collstrop	131

=== Team classification ===
Rank	Team	Points
1.	Tabriz Petrochemical Team	909.64
2.	Meitan Hompo-GDR	545
3.	Skil–Shimano	338.6
4.	LeTua Cycling Team	279
5.	Trek–Marco Polo	278
6.	Diquigiovanni–Androni	273
7.	Giant Asia Racing Team	252
8.	Aisan Racing Team	242
9.	Rock Racing	204
10.	Katyusha	182

=== Nation classification ===
Rank	Nation	Points
1.	Japan	1181.2
2.	Iran	1160.98
3.	Uzbekistan	502.66
4.	Kazakhstan	401.66
5.	China	296
6.	Malaysia	269
7.	Indonesia	260
8.	United Arab Emirates	248
9.	Kyrgyzstan	172
10.	Mongolia	157

=== Nation under-23 classification ===
Rank	Nation under-23	Points
1.	Iran	386
2.	Malaysia	233
3.	Uzbekistan	186
4.	United Arab Emirates	106
5.	South Korea	62
6.	Kazakhstan	48
7.	Japan	27
8.	Indonesia	22
9.	Mongolia	19
10.	Lebanon	16
