= 1999 Jelajah Malaysia =

Race details
- Dates: 3–11 November 1999
- Stages: 8+Prologue
- Distance: 863.8 km (536.7 mi)
- Winning time: 16h 25' 48"

Results
	Winner	Peter Jörg (SUI)
	Second	Herry Janto Setiawan (INA)
	Third	Suyinto (INA)

The 1999 Jelajah Malaysia was a cycling stage race that took place in Malaysia. It was held from 3 to 11 November 1999. There were eight stages with a prologue. The race was sanctioned by the Union Cycliste Internationale as a 2.2 category race.

Peter Jörg of Switzerland won the race, followed by Herry Janto Setiawan of Indonesia second and Suyinto of Indonesia third overall.

== Stages ==
Stage	Date	Start	Finish	Distance	Stage winner
P	3 November	Muar Individual Time Trial		4 km (2.5 mi)	(Malaysia) Musairi Musa
1	4 November	Muar		92 km (57.2 mi)	(Indonesia) Herry Janto Setiawan
2	5 November	Malacca		105 km (65.2 mi)	(Indonesia) Herry Janto Setiawan
3	6 November	Negeri Sembilan		63 km (39.1 mi)	(Kazakhstan) Serguei Derevyanov
4	7 November	Kuala Selangor		100 km (62.1 mi)	(Indonesia) Wawan Setyobudi
5	8 November	Ipoh		77 km (47.8 mi)	(Indonesia) Matnur
6	9 November	Penang		74 km (46.0 mi)	(Indonesia) Samai
7	10 November	Sungai Petani		96 km (59.7 mi)	(Indonesia) Heryawan Sutjahjanto
8	11 November	Kangar		105 km (65.2 mi)	(Indonesia) Sulistiyono

== Final standings ==
=== General classification ===
Rank	Rider	Team	Time
1	(Switzerland) Peter Jörg		16h 25' 48"
2	(Indonesia) Herry Janto Setiawan		s.t.
3	(Indonesia) Suyinto		s.t.
4	(Malaysia) Tsen Seong Hoong		s.t.
5	(Malaysia) Shahrulneeza Mohd Razali		s.t.
6	(Kazakhstan) Serguei Derevyanov		s.t.
7	(Indonesia) Wawan Setyobudi		s.t.
8	(Indonesia) Matnur		s.t.
9	(Malaysia) Musairi Musa		s.t.
10	(Switzerland) Urs Spycher		s.t.
