= Patrick Shaw =

Patrick Shaw may refer to:

- Patrick Shaw (diplomat) (1913–1975), Australian diplomat
- Patrick Shaw (legal writer) (1796–1872), Scottish lawyer and legal writer
- Patrick Shaw (politician) (1872–1940), Irish politician
- Patrick Shaw (cyclist) (born 1986), Australian cyclist

== See also ==
- Patrick Shaw-Stewart (1888–1917), British scholar and poet
