= 2003 Jelajah Malaysia =

Race details
- Dates: 6–15 October 2003
- Stages: 10

Results
	Winner	Hidenori Nodera (JPN)
	Second	Wawan Setyobudi (INA)

The 2003 Jelajah Malaysia, a cycling stage race that took place in Malaysia. It was held from 6 to 15 October 2003. There were ten stages. In fact, the race was sanctioned by the Union Cycliste Internationale as a 2.2 category race.

Hidenori Nodera of Japan won the race, followed by Wawan Setyobudi of Indonesia second overall.

== Stages ==
Stage	Date	Start	Finish	Stage Top 3
1	6 October	Alor Setar	Pendang	(Kazakhstan) Yuriy Yuda (Japan) Hidenori Nodera (Hong Kong) Wong Ngai Ching
2	7 October	Kangar	Butterworth	(Indonesia) Samai Samai (Indonesia) Wawan Setyobudi (Kazakhstan) Vladimir Bushanskiy
3	8 October	Butterworth	Ipoh	(Uzbekistan) Ulugbek Salamov (Hong Kong) Wong Ngai Ching (Malaysia) Suhardi Hassan
4	9 October	Ipoh	Kuala Kubu Bharu	
5	10 October	Putrajaya		(Indonesia) Wandra Suwandra (Indonesia) Matnur (Uzbekistan) Ulugbek Salamov
6	11 October	Bangi	Malacca	(Indonesia) Samai Samai (Hong Kong) Chan Chun Hing (Hong Kong) Wong Ngai Ching
7	12 October	Malacca	Sungai Mati	(Indonesia) Samai Samai (Philippines) Paolo Manupol (Indonesia) Kaswanto
8	13 October			
9	14 October	Kota Tinggi		(Indonesia) Wawan Setyobudi (Indonesia) (Hong Kong) Wong Ngai Ching
10	15 October	Kota Tinggi		(Germany) Felix Rohrbach (Kazakhstan) Vladimir Bushanskiy (China) Xu Gang

== Final standings ==
=== General classification ===
Rank	Rider	Team	Time
1	(Japan) Hidenori Nodera		
2	(Indonesia) Wawan Setyobudi		
