= Sweet Nice Continental Cycling Team =

Malaysian cycling team

Team information
- UCI code: SNC
- Registered: Malaysia
- Founded: 2020
- Disbanded: 2022
- Discipline: Road
- Status: UCI Continental
- Website: Team home page

Team name history
- 2021–2022: Sweet Nice Continental Cycling Team

Sweet Nice Continental Cycling Team is a former Malaysian UCI Continental cycling team focusing on road bicycle racing. Teng Soon Sik and Fariman Zulkifli are the founders.

The team was active in 2021 and 2022, after which no further updates of the team activity were announced in any media.

== Team roster ==
As of 27 February 2022

Rider	Date of birth
Mohd Hafidz Abd Hamid (MAS)	31 August 1992 (age 34)
Laurel Lauridsen Adrian (MAS)	22 November 1992 (age 33)
Ahmad Haidar Anuawar (MAS)	25 April 1986 (age 40)
Muhammad Al Azim Bin Zahari (MAS)	25 December 2001 (age 24)
Charles Kin (MAS)	8 September 1993 (age 32)

Rider	Date of birth
Konosuke Nagashio (JPN)	18 March 2002 (age 24)
Lim Ren Jie (MAS)	4 September 1990 (age 36)
Tuan Muhammad Amsyar Tuan Daud (MAS)	11 August 2003 (age 23)
Wan Mohamad Ali Wan Zulkifli (MAS)	3 October 1999 (age 26)
Muhamad Aimanfitri Zainol Abidin (MAS)	19 January 1999 (age 27)

== Major wins ==
2020

Uzbekistan National Time Trial Championships, Muradjan Khalmuratov

== National champions ==
2020

Uzbekistan Time trial champion, Muradjan Khalmuratov
