= Adiq Husainie Othman =

Malaysian cyclist

Mohammed Adiq Husainie Othman
Personal information
- Full name: Mohammed Adiq Husainie Othman
- Born: 29 April 1991 (age 35) Terengganu, Malaysia
- Height: 173 cm (5 ft 8 in)
- Weight: 64 kg (141 lb)

Cycling career
- Sport: Cycling
- Discipline: Road
- Role: Rider

Professional teams
- 2010–2011: Drapac–Porsche Cycling
- 2012–2013: Champion System
- 2014–2017: Terengganu Cycling Team
- 2018: Team Sapura Cycling

Mohammed Adiq Husainie Othman (born 29 April 1991) is a Malaysian professional racing cyclist, who last rode for UCI Continental team Team Sapura Cycling. He competed for Malaysia at the 2012 Olympic Games, in the men's road race. He also competed at the 2010 and 2018 Commonwealth Games, in track cycling.

== Major results ==
2007
3rd Overall Tour of Terengganu
2008
1st Road race, National Junior Road Championships
3rd Time trial, Asian Junior Road Championships
2009
Asian Junior Cycling Championships

2nd Road race
3rd Madison
3rd Scratch

3rd Scratch, UCI Juniors Track World Championships
2010
1st Road race, National Road Championships
7th Overall Jelajah Malaysia
2011
Southeast Asian Games

1st Team pursuit
2nd Points race

1st Stage 6 Tour de Korea
1st Mountains classification Jelajah Malaysia
2nd Overall Tour de Brunei

1st Stage 1

3rd Points race, Asian Track Championships
9th Overall Tour of Hainan
2012
2nd Road race, Asian Under-23 Road Championships
6th Overall Jelajah Malaysia

1st Points classification

10th Overall Tour de Taiwan
2013
3rd Team time trial, Southeast Asian Games
3rd Road race, National Road Championships
4th Overall Jelajah Malaysia
9th Road race, Asian Under-23 Road Championships
2014
7th Overall Sharjah International Cycling Tour
8th Overall Jelajah Malaysia
2015
5th Time trial, Southeast Asian Games
3rd Stage 5 2015 Tour de Langkawi

2016
1st Asian rider classification Tour de Langkawi
2017
1st Stage 2 Jelajah Malaysia
8th Road race, Southeast Asian Games

== Honours ==
- Terengganu
  - Recipient of the Meritorious Service Medal (PJK) (2012)
