= Dimitri Jiriakov =

Liechtenstein cyclist (born 1985)

Personal information
- Born: 8 November 1985 (age 40) Moscow, Russia

Cycling career
- Sport: Cycling
- Current team: Retired
- Discipline: Road
- Role: Rider

Professional teams
- 2006: Rufalex
- 2008: Team Stegcomputer–CKT–Cogeas

Dimitri Jiriakov (born 8 November 1985 in Moscow) is a Liechtenstein cyclist.

== Major results ==
2001
1st Road race, Games of the Small States of Europe
2006
1st Road race, National Road Championships
2007
National Road Championships

1st Road race
1st Time trial

2008
National Road Championships

1st Road race
1st Time trial

6th Overall Jelajah Malaysia
