= Anuar Manan =

Malaysian cyclist

Personal information
- Full name: Anuar Manan
- Born: 11 October 1986 (age 40) Kuala Terengganu, Malaysia
- Height: 168 cm (5 ft 6 in)

Cycling career
- Sport: Cycling
- Discipline: Road
- Role: Rider

Amateur team
- 2019: Amskins Cycling Club

Professional teams
- 2007–2008: LeTua Cycling Team
- 2009: Azad University Iran
- 2010: Geumsan Ginseng Asia
- 2011: Terengganu Cycling Team
- 2012: Champion System
- 2013: Synergy Baku
- 2013: CCN
- 2014–2017: Terengganu Cycling Team
- 2018: Forca Amskins Racing

Anuar Manan (born 11 October 1986) is a Malaysian professional cyclist, who last rode for Malaysian amateur team Amskins Cycling Club.

== Career ==
=== LeTua Cycling Team ===
Anuar started his career with the LeTua Cycling Team and won two stages of the 2007 Jelajah Malaysia and the blue jersey. In the same year, he also won one stage in the Azerbaijan Tour and the Tour of Hainan. In the 2008 Jelajah Malaysia, he retained his blue jersey and won three stages.

=== Azad University Iran ===
Anuar made a decision to join Iranian team Azad University Iran. Anuar won three stages in the 2009 Jelajah Malaysia and became first rider to win the blue jersey – for the sprints classification – for three successive years.

=== Geumsan Ginseng Asia ===
Anuar had to leave Iran because of a visa problem and then signed a contract with Korean team Geumsan Ginseng Asia. Anuar became the first Malaysian rider to win a stage in the Tour de Langkawi, winning stage five, and also became the first Malaysian rider to win the points classification, in the race. He also won two stages in the Tour of Thailand and one each in the Tour of East Java and the Tour of Ganzhou Songcheng.

=== Terengganu Cycling Team ===
Anuar returned to Malaysia and joined the Terengganu Cycling Team, winning stages in the Jelajah Malaysia, the Tour de Brunei and the Tour of Hainan.

=== Champion System ===
For the 2012 season, Anuar was signed by Asian team Champion System, joining the likes of Jaan Kirsipuu in the team.

=== Synergy Baku ===
For the 2013 season, Anuar joined Synergy Baku. Prior to the end of 2013, he joined CCN on a loan move ahead of the Tour of Poyang Lake.

=== Return to Terengganu Cycling Team ===
He would later rejoin the Terengganu Cycling Team for the 2014 season.

=== Forca Amskins Racing ===
Anuar were released from Terengganu Cycling Team at the end of 2017. He later founded his own team Forca Amskins Racing as a platform mainly to ride the 2018 Tour de Langkawi.

Unfortunately the team faced financial difficulties and failed to register for the 2019 Tour de Langkawi. The team also failed to be registered for the 2020 UCI road race calendar, and the professional team were dissolved soon after.

== Major results ==
2007
Jelajah Malaysia

1st Sprints classification
1st Stages 3 & 6

1st Stage 9 Tour of Azerbaijan (Iran)
1st Stage 5 Tour de East Java
1st Stage 2 Tour of Hainan
6th Road race, Southeast Asian Games
2008
Jelajah Malaysia

1st Sprints classification
1st Stages 2, 3 & 5

1st Sprints classification Tour de Langkawi
2009
Jelajah Malaysia

1st Points classification
1st Stages 4 & 5

2010
1st Stage 2 Tour de East Java
Tour de Langkawi

1st Points classification
1st Stage 5

Tour of Thailand

1st Stages 3 & 4

2011
1st Stage 4 Jelajah Malaysia
1st Stage 2 Tour de Brunei
1st Stage 5 Tour of Hainan
8th Melaka Governor's Cup
2013
Tour of Poyang Lake

1st Stages 1, 2, 3 & 4

1st Stage 1 Tour de East Java
1st Points classification Tour of Borneo
5th Melaka Governor's Cup
2015
Jelajah Malaysia

1st Stages 3 & 5

3rd Road race, Southeast Asian Games
