= Kohei Uchima =

Japanese bicycle racer

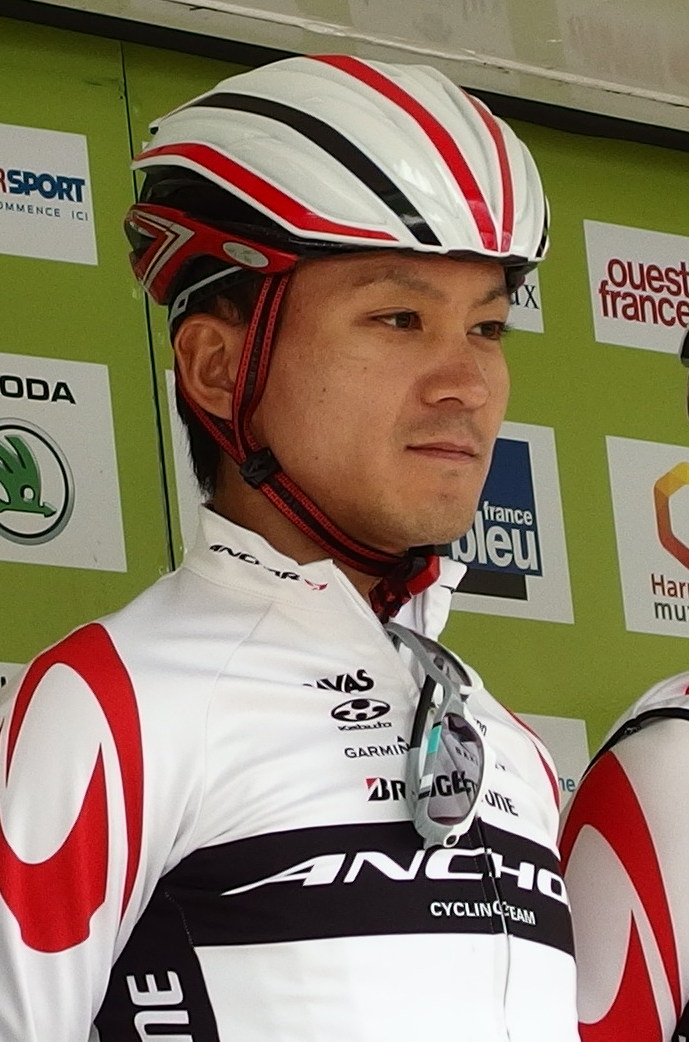
- Uchima in 2015.

Personal information
- Full name: Kohei Uchima; Japanese: 内間 康平
- Born: November 8, 1988 (age 37) Urasoe, Japan

Cycling career
- Sport: Cycling
- Disciplines: Road; Track
- Role: Rider

Professional teams
- 2011–2013: D'Angelo & Antenucci–Nippo
- 2014–2016: Bridgestone–Anchor
- 2017–2018: Nippo–Vini Fantini
- 2019–2020: Team UKYO

Kohei Uchima (内間 康平, Uchima Kōhei; born November 8, 1988, in Urasoe) is a Japanese cyclist, who was selected to represent Japan in the 2015 UCI Road World Championships.

After ten years as a professional – competing with Bridgestone–Anchor, Nippo–Vini Fantini–Europa Ovini (two spells) and Team UKYO – Uchima retired from road cycling in August 2020, aiming to enter Keirin racing.

== Major results ==
2008
2nd Road race, National Under-23 Road Championships
2010
7th Overall Tour of Thailand

1st Stage 5

7th Overall Tour de Hokkaido
2011
7th Overall Tour de Okinawa
2014
Tour de Singkarak

1st Stages 1 & 6

3rd Overall Tour de Hokkaido
7th Tour de Okinawa
8th Overall Tour of Thailand
9th Overall Tour de Taiwan
2015
1st Prologue (TTT) Tour de Guadeloupe
2nd Overall Tour of Thailand

1st Stage 1

3rd Road race, Asian Road Championships
7th Overall Tour de Hokkaido
2016
3rd Tour de Okinawa
8th Overall Tour de Kumano
2019
2nd Overall Tour de Iskandar Johor
2nd Tour de Okinawa
