= Fredrik Johansson (cyclist) =

Swedish cyclist (born 1978)

Personal information
- Born: 18 March 1978 (age 48) Uppsala, Sweden

Cycling career
- Sport: Cycling
- Discipline: Racing
- Role: Rider

Fredrik Johansson (born 18 March 1978) is a Swedish professional racing cyclist.

== Career highlights ==
2003
1st in Stage 4 3 dagars Hammarö, Hammarö (SWE)

2004
3rd in General Classification Tour du Brabant Wallon, Ottignies (BEL)
3rd in National Championship, Road, ITT, Elite, Sweden, Sollerön (SWE)
3rd in GP Demy-Cars (LUX)
3rd in GP Claude Criquielion (BEL)

2006
1st in Boucles de la Marne (FRA)
1st in GP Demy-Cars (LUX)
2nd in General Classification Tour de Namur, Namur-Citadel (BEL)
2nd in Vlaamse/Antwerpse Havenpijl (BEL)
2nd in Prix de la Ville de Nogent-sur-Oise (FRA)
3rd in GP Faber (LUX)
3rd in Internatie Reningelst, Reningelst (BEL)

2007
1st in General Classification Ronde de l'Oise (FRA)
2nd in Padborg/Bov CC, Padborg (DEN)
3rd in Herning (b) (DEN)

2008
1st in Stage 4 Jelajah Malaysia, Muar (MAS)
3rd in General Classification Jelajah Malaysia (MAS)
