= Takumi Beppu =

Japanese racing cyclist

Personal information
- Full name: Takumi Beppu
- Born: September 29, 1979 (age 47) Chigasaki, Kanagawa, Japan
- Height: 1.68 m (5 ft 6 in)
- Weight: 60 kg (130 lb)

Cycling career
- Sport: Cycling
- Current team: Aisan Racing Team
- Discipline: Road
- Role: Rider (retired); Directeur sportif

Amateur team
- 2002–2003: Jura Suisse–Nippon Hodo

Professional team
- 2006–2010: Aisan Racing Team

Managerial team
- 2011–: Aisan Racing Team

Takumi Beppu (別府匠, Beppu Takumi; born September 9, 1979 in Chigasaki, Kanagawa) is a Japanese former racing cyclist, who currently works as a directeur sportif for UCI Continental team Aisan Racing Team. His younger brother Fumiyuki Beppu is also former professional cyclist.

== Major results ==
2002
9th Tour de Okinawa
2004
1st Stage 2 Tour of Japan
6th Tour de Okinawa
2005
6th Tour de Okinawa
8th Overall Tour of Japan
10th Tour du Lac Léman
2006
1st Challenge Cycle Road Race
4th Overall Tour of Hong Kong Shanghai
5th Tour de Okinawa
6th Overall Tour of South China Sea
10th Overall Tour of Japan
2007
5th Overall Tour de East Java
2009
7th Overall Tour de East Java
2010
2nd Overall Jelajah Malaysia
9th Kumamoto International Road Race
