= Ahmad Haidar Anuawar =

Malaysian cyclist (born 1986)

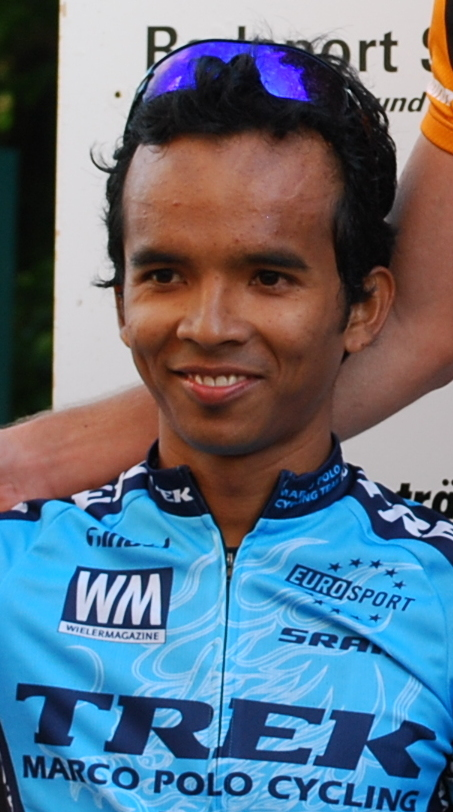

Personal information
- Full name: Ahmad Haidar Anuawar
- Born: 25 April 1986 (age 40) Malaysia

Cycling career
- Sport: Cycling
- Current team: Sweet Nice Continental Cycling Team
- Discipline: Road
- Role: Rider

Amateur teams
- 2006: LeTua Cycling Team
- 2019–2020: Kelantan Kembang Jaya Emas

Professional teams
- 2007–2008: LeTua Cycling Team
- 2009–2010: Trek–Marco Polo
- 2012–2014: OCBC Singapore Continental Cycling Team
- 2021–: Sweet Nice Continental Cycling Team

Ahmad Haidar Anuawar (born 25 April 1986) is a Malaysian professional racing cyclist, who currently rides for UCI Continental team Sweet Nice Continental Cycling Team.

== Major results ==
2007
1st Stage 3 Tour of Siam
1st Stage 3 Cepa Tour
2014
6th Critérium International de Blida
