= Herry Janto Setiawan =

Indonesian cyclist

Personal information
- Born: 10 August 1973
- Died: 10 October 2013 (aged 40)

Cycling career
- Sport: Cycling

Herry Janto Setiawan (10 August 1973 – 10 October 2013) was an Indonesian cyclist. He competed in the track time trial at the 1992 Summer Olympics.
