= Patrick Shaw (cyclist) =

Australian cyclist

Pat Shaw
Personal information
- Full name: Patrick Shaw
- Born: 19 February 1986 (age 40) Victoria, Australia

Cycling career
- Sport: Cycling
- Current team: Retired
- Discipline: Road
- Role: Rider

Amateur teams
- 2005–2007: Victorian Institute of Sport
- 2008–2009: Fracor Modolo Prosciutto Pratomagno
- 2010: Virgin Blue–RBS Morgans
- 2013: Satalyst Giant Racing

Professional teams
- 2011–2012: Genesys Wealth Advisers
- 2014–2016: Avanti Racing Team

Patrick Shaw (born 19 February 1986) is an Australian former racing cyclist.

== Career ==
Shaw's first victory was stage race Tour of the Southern Grampians in 2007. At the end of the 2009 season, he considered retiring due to failing to get a contract with a European team, but decided to continue riding. 2010 was a successful season for Shaw, as he won stage races Tour of Toowoomba and Tour of Gippsland, along with a stage victory and second place in the Tour of Geelong and one day race Launceston to New Norfolk Classic. These victories gave him first in the Scody Cup National Road Series.

The following year was Shaw's first year as a professional with UCI Continental team Genesys Wealth Advisers. During this season, he booked the overall win of the Tour of Toowoomba, along with the second stage. Shaw left the team for the 2013 season, when he rode for amateur team Satalyst Giant Racing. Shaw announced that he would retire at the end of the 2013 season, but decided to return to Genesys Wealth Advisers the following season and hold off his retirement. Shaw made his UCI World Tour debut in the 2016 Tour Down Under when he was selected for the UniSA-Australia team. He retired at the end of 2016.

== Major results ==
2007
1st Overall Tour of the Southern Grampians

1st Stage 1

2010
1st Scody Cup National Road Series
1st Overall Tour of Toowoomba
1st Overall Tour of Gippsland
1st Stage 2 Tour of Geelong
1st Launceston to New Norfolk Classic
2011
1st Overall Tour of Toowoomba

1st Stage 2

2012
6th Overall Tour de Kumano
2013
1st Melbourne to Ballarat Classic
6th Overall New Zealand Cycle Classic
2014
6th Overall New Zealand Cycle Classic
2015
1st Stage 1 Tour of the Great South Coast
2016
1st Stage 3 Mitchelton Bay Classic
9th Overall Tour de Korea
9th Oceanian Road Race Championships
