= David McCann (cyclist) =

Irish cyclist (born 1973)

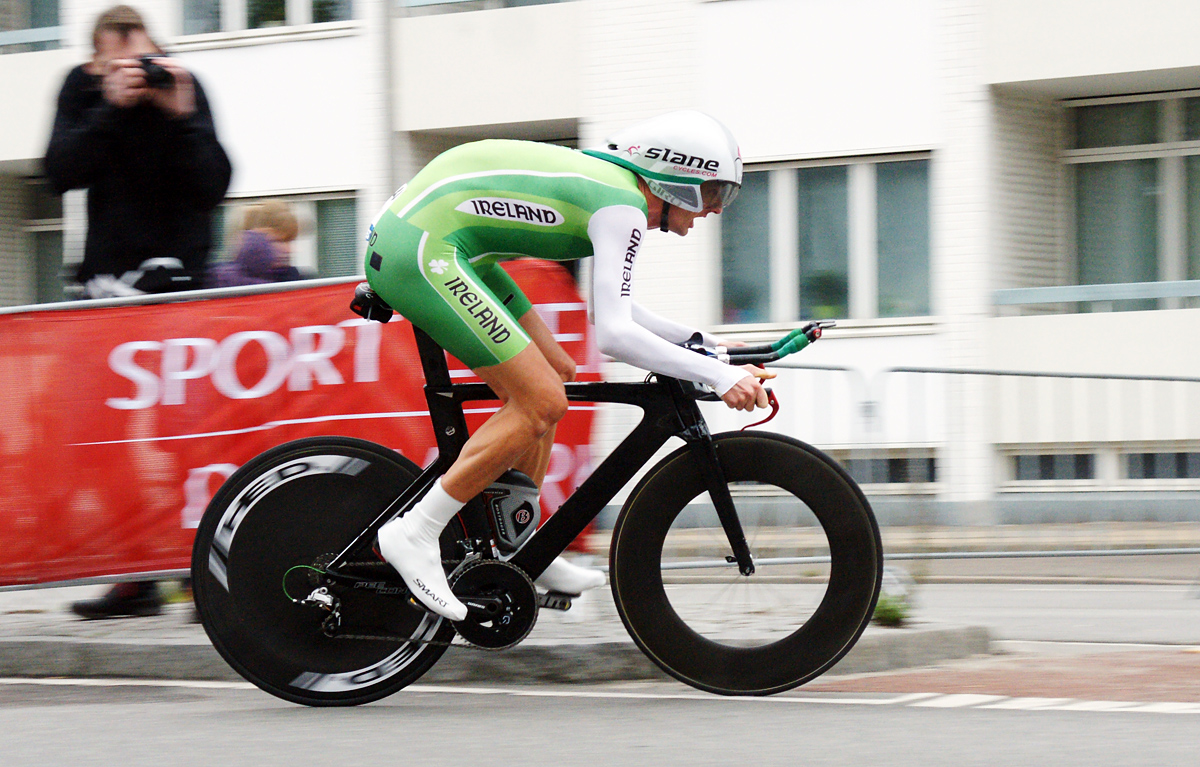
- McCann during the time trial at the 2011 UCI Road World Championships

Personal information
- Full name: David McCann
- Born: 17 March 1973 (age 53) Belfast, Northern Ireland
- Height: 1.86 m (6 ft 1 in)
- Weight: 73 kg (161 lb)

Cycling career
- Sport: Cycling
- Current team: Retired
- Disciplines: Road; Track
- Role: Rider
- Rider type: Time trialist

Amateur team
- 2000: Phoenix CC

Professional teams
- 2001: Ceresit–CCC–Mat
- 2002: Volksbank–Ideal
- 2003: Team Endurasport.com–Principia
- 2004–2006: Giant Asia Racing Team
- 2007: Colavita–Sutter Home
- 2008: Giant Asia Racing Team
- 2009: Ride Sport Racing
- 2010–2012: Giant Asia Racing Team
- 2013: Synergy Baku Cycling Project

Major wins
- Irish National Road Race Championships (2000, 2001, 2006); Irish National Time Trial Championships (2001, 2002, 2004, 2005, 2009, 2010)
Medal record
Men's track cycling
Representing Northern Ireland
Commonwealth Games
Bronze medal – third place	2010 Delhi	Team pursuit

David McCann (born 17 March 1973 in Belfast) is an Irish former professional road bicycle racer, who rode in the 1996, 2000 and 2012 Olympic Games. He was the Irish national road race champion in 2000, 2001 and 2006, and won the Irish national time trial championships a record 6 times (2001, 2002, 2004, 2005, 2009 & 2010). He last rode for the Synergy Baku Cycling Project, an Azerbaijan-registered UCI Continental team.

== Biography ==
In 2005, McCann captured the overall title at the Tour de Korea. In 2006 he won the Tour of Indonesia; 2 stages in the Tour of Thailand; 1 stage at the Tour of Qinghai Lake and 1 stage in the Tour of Azerbaijan. He represented Northern Ireland at the Commonwealth Games time trial, finishing 5th.

On 20 September 2009, McCann broke Chris Boardman's long-standing British 25 mile time trial record in Port Talbot. Later that week, he finished in 11th in the World Championships Elite Time Trial in Mendrisio, Switzerland. His time of 1:01:36.35 was 3 minutes 40 seconds behind the gold medallist Fabian Cancellara. This was McCann's best ever performance at the World Championships. He was UCI ranked 31st on the 2009 Asian Tour, and ranked 4th for the 2010 season with 298.66 points after 11 wins.

He was UCI ranked 42nd on the 2011 UCI Asia Tour (75 pts), thanks mainly to 2nd place GC finishes in the Jelajah Malaysia and in the Tour de Taiwan.

He rode on the Irish three man team for the 2010 World Championships alongside Nicolas Roche and Matt Brammeier, finishing 68th. He won a team pursuit bronze with Northern Ireland at the Commonwealth Games in Delhi, and followed this up with 5th in the Commonwealth Road Race.

In 2002, McCann received a six-month suspension following a positive test for Norandrosterone. He claimed a contaminated glutamine supplement led to the finding. Like several other athletes suspended around this time, McCann was sponsored by sport nutrition company Maximmuscle. After testing 3 nanograms above the permitted level, Laboratory tests showed a legal glutamine supplement he was using contained a minute amount of norandrosterone not listed on the label. This led to him being given the minimum allowed six-month suspension.

== Major results ==
1996
1st Overall Tour of Ulster
1st Shay Elliott Memorial Race
1st Manx Trophy
2nd Overall FBD Insurance Rás
1997
2nd Road race, National Road Championships
1998
National Road Championships

2nd Road race
2nd Time trial

2000
1st Road race, National Road Championships
1st Stage 8 Tour de Guadeloupe
2nd Manx Trophy
2nd Archer Grand Prix
6th Overall FBD Insurance Rás

1st Stage 6

2001
National Road Championships

1st Road race
1st Time trial

1st Overall FBD Insurance Rás

1st Points classification
1st Mountains classification
1st Stage 1

1st Overall Tour de Hokkaido

1st Points classification
1st Stages 1, 3 & 5

2002
1st Time trial, National Road Championships
1st Manx Trophy
8th Time trial, Commonwealth Games
2003
3rd Road race, UCI B World Championships
3rd Manx Trophy
7th Tour de Okinawa
2004
National Road Championships

1st Time trial
2nd Road race

1st Overall FBD Insurance Rás

1st Stages 4 & 7

5th Overall Tour de Korea

1st Stages 1 & 2

5th Havant International GP
6th Lincoln Grand Prix
7th Archer Grand Prix
9th GP Stad Vilvoorde
2005
National Road Championships

1st Time trial
3rd Road race

1st Overall Tour de Korea

1st Stage 2

1st Overall Tour of Milad du Nour

1st Stage 1

1st Overall Tour of Ulster

1st Stage 3

1st Stage 2 Tour of Indonesia
1st Stages 3 & 4 Rás Mumhan
2nd Overall Tour of Siam
3rd Overall Herald Sun Tour

1st Stage 6 (ITT)

3rd Shay Elliott Memorial Race
4th Overall Kerman Tour
5th Overall Tour of Azerbaijan (Iran)

1st Stage 3

6th Overall Tour de Taiwan
7th Tour de Okinawa
2006
1st Road race, National Road Championships
1st Overall Tour of Indonesia
1st Stage 6 Tour of Qinghai Lake
1st Stages 1 (ITT) & 4 Tour of Thailand
3rd Overall Herald Sun Tour
5th Time trial, Commonwealth Games
5th Overall Tour de Taiwan
2007
2nd Time trial, National Road Championships
9th Overall FBD Insurance Rás
2008
1st Stage 5 Tour de Korea-Japan
1st Stage 4 FBD Insurance Rás
2nd Overall Tour of Hainan
4th Overall Tour of Qinghai Lake
6th Chrono Champenois
10th Overall Jelajah Malaysia
2009
1st Time trial, National Road Championships
1st Overall Suir Valley Three Day

1st Points classification
1st Stage 1

3rd Chrono Champenois
5th Overall Jelajah Malaysia
8th Overall FBD Insurance Rás
10th Time trial, UCI Road World Championships
2010
National Road Championships

1st Time trial
4th Road race

1st Overall Tour de Taiwan

1st Stage 1

1st Overall Jelajah Malaysia
1st Overall Tour de Filipinas

1st Stages 1 & 4

1st Overall Melaka Governor Cup

1st Stage 1

1st Stage 2 Tour of Thailand
Commonwealth Games

3rd Team pursuit
5th Road race

5th Overall Tour of Qinghai Lake
8th Overall Tour of Singkarak
9th Overall Tour of China
2011
1st Stage 8 An Post Rás
National Road Championships

2nd Time trial
3rd Road race

2nd Overall Tour de Taiwan
2nd Overall Jelajah Malaysia
8th Overall Tour of Ulster

1st Stage 1

2012
2nd Overall Tour of Fuzhou
3rd Taiwan KOM Challenge
5th Overall Tour of Taihu Lake
2013
2nd Time trial, National Road Championships
