= Ng Yong Li =

Malaysian cyclist

Personal information
- Full name: Ng Yong Li
- Born: 6 October 1985 (age 41) Johor, Malaysia

Cycling career
- Sport: Cycling
- Current team: Kuwait Pro Cycling Team
- Discipline: Road
- Role: Rider (retired); Directeur sportif

Amateur team
- 2013: Team Corbusier

Professional teams
- 2005–2006: Proton T-Bikes Cycling Team
- 2007: Vitória–ASC
- 2008: Meitan Hompo-GDR
- 2009–2011: LeTua Cycling Team
- 2012: Azad University Cross Team
- 2013: RTS Racing Team
- 2014: RTS–Santic Racing Team

Managerial teams
- 2018: Forca Amskins Racing
- 2019: Brunei Continental Cycling Team
- 2021–: Kuwait Pro Cycling Team

Ng Yong Li (Chinese: 黄永利, born 6 October 1985) is a Malaysian former professional racing cyclist, who rode professionally between 2005 and 2014 for six different teams. He now works as a directeur sportif for UCI Continental team Kuwait Pro Cycling Team.

== Career ==
Ng made history in 2007 when he became the first Malaysian rider to sign with European team Vitoria-ASC from Portugal. He then raced for Japanese team Meitan Hompo-GDR before returning to Malaysia to spend three years with LeTua Cycling Team. He joined Azad University Cross Team in 2012.

Ng had been due to join Start-Trigon for the 2014 season, but returned to RTS–Santic Racing Team in June 2014.

== Major results ==
2009
1st Stage 1 Tour of Terengganu
2nd Overall Tengku Mahkota Pahang Trophy
2013
1st Stage 2 Satu GP
