= Shinpei Fukuda =

Japanese cyclist (born 1987)

Personal information
- Full name: Shinpei Fukuda; Japanese: 福田 真平
- Born: 22 November 1987 (age 38) Fujisawa, Kanagawa, Japan
- Height: 1.67 m (5 ft 6 in)
- Weight: 70 kg (154 lb)

Cycling career
- Sport: Cycling
- Current team: Kinan Racing Team
- Discipline: Road
- Role: Rider
- Rider type: Sprinter

Professional teams
- 2007: Team Miyata–Subaru
- 2008–2009: Bridgestone–Anchor
- 2010–2016: Aisan Racing Team
- 2020–: Kinan Cycling Team

Shinpei Fukuda (Japanese: 福田 真平; born 22 November 1987) is a Japanese road cyclist, who currently rides for UCI Continental team Kinan Racing Team.

== Major results ==
2007
10th Tour de Okinawa
2008
9th Overall Tour de Okinawa
2011
1st Stage 1 Tour de Kumano
2013
1st Stage 3 Tour de Ijen
