= Sergey Kudentsov =

Russian bicycle racer

Personal information
- Full name: Sergey Kudentsov
- Born: 29 September 1978 (age 48)

Cycling career
- Sport: Cycling
- Current team: Retired
- Discipline: Road
- Role: Rider
- Rider type: Sprinter

Professional teams
- 2006: Premier
- 2006–2008: Marco Polo
- 2009–2010: Polygon Sweet Nice Team
- 2011–2012: Giant Kenda Cycling Team
- 2014: Ningxia Sports Lottery Cycling Team

Sergey Kudentsov (born 29 July 1978) is a Russian former professional cyclist.

== Major results ==
1999
1st Overall Five Rings of Moscow
2003
1st Stage 3 Tour of South China Sea
2004
Tour of South China Sea

1st Stages 7 & 8

2006
Tour of Chongming Island

1st Stages 2 & 4

Tour d'Indonesia

1st Stages 2 & 8

2007
1st Stage 6 Tour de Korea
Tour of Hainan

1st Stages 1 & 4

2008
Tour of South China Sea

1st Stages 5 & 6

1st Stage 1 Tour de East Java
2009
Tour d'Indonesia

1st Stages 3 & 8

2010
1st Overall Tour of Poyang Lake

1st Stages 2, 4 & 5

1st Stage 2 Melaka Governor Cup
Tour d'Indonesia

1st Stages 1 (TTT), 4 & 9
