= Polygon Sweet Nice =

Team information
- UCI code: PSN
- Registered: Indonesia (2006–2012); Ireland (2013)
- Founded: 2006
- Disbanded: 2013
- Discipline: Road
- Status: UCI Continental (2006–2010, 2013); Club (2011–2012)

Key personnel
- General manager: Stewart Carr
- Team manager: Sastra Tjondrokusumo Harijanto

Team name history
- 2006–2008 2009–2013: Polygon Sweet Nice; Polygon Sweet Nice Team

Polygon Sweet Nice was an Indonesian and Irish-registered UCI Continental cycling team that was founded in 2006 and disbanded in 2013.

For the 2013 season the team rejoined the UCI Continental ranks after being an amateur team for the previous three seasons.

== 2013 team roster ==
Rider	Date of birth
Dealton Nur Arif Prayogo (IDN)	27 November 1992 (aged 21)
Daniel Clifford (IRE)	10 September 1987 (aged 26)
Mark Dowling (IRE)	18 July 1986 (aged 27)
Stephen Halpin (IRE)	16 July 1986 (aged 27)
Sergey Kuzmin (KAZ)	1 July 1990 (aged 23)
Edgar Nohales Nieto (ESP)	28 July 1986 (aged 27)

Rider	Date of birth
Jimmy Pranata (IDN)	28 August 1990 (aged 23)
Charles Prendergast (IRE)	29 January 1991 (aged 22)
Óscar Pujol (ESP)	16 October 1983 (aged 30)
Agung Riyanto (IDN)	24 November 1992 (aged 21)
Ryan Sherlock (IRE)	20 January 1982 (aged 31)
Antonius Christopher Tjondrokusumo (IDN)	29 October 1987 (aged 26)

== Major wins ==
2008
Stage 1 Tour de Indonesia, Artem Timofeev
2009
Stage 2 Perlis Open, Herwin Wijaya
Stage 1 Tour de East Java, Sergey Kudentsov
Stages 3 & 8 Tour de Indonesia, Sergey Kudentsov
2013
Stage 1 Tour de Singkarak, Óscar Pujol
