= Suhardi Hassan =

Malaysian racing cyclist

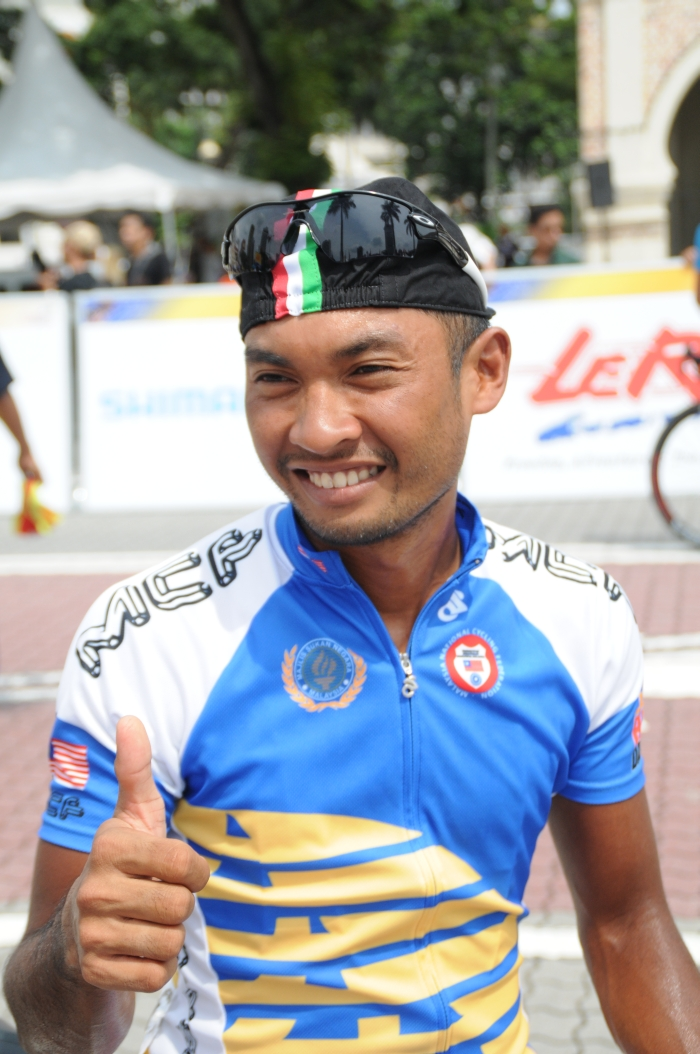

Personal information
- Full name: Suhardi Hassan
- Born: 7 April 1982 (age 44) Kangar, Perlis, Malaysia

Cycling career
- Sport: Cycling
- Current team: Kuala Lumpur Cycling Team
- Discipline: Road
- Role: Rider

Professional teams
- 2005–2006: Proton T-Bikes Cycling Team
- 2007–present: Kuala Lumpur Cycling Team

Major wins
- Jelajah Malaysia (2008)

Suhardi Hassan (born 7 April 1982) is a Malaysian professional racing cyclist, in 2011 riding for the Kuala Lumpur Cycling Team.

== Career highlights ==
- 2003: 3rd in Stage 3 Jelajah Malaysia, Ipoh (Malaysia)
- 2004: 1st in General classification Jelajah Malaysia (Malaysia)
- 2005: Gold medal Sea Game 2005 Philippines
- 2007: 1st in Stage 6 Tour of Negri Sembilan (Malaysia)
- 2007: 2nd in South East Asian Games, Road, Elite (Thailand)
- 2010: 1st in Stage 4 Jelajah Malaysia
