= Amir Mustafa Rusli =

Malaysian cyclist (born 1987)

Amir Mustafa Rusli PPN PJK OLY
Personal information
- Full name: Amir Mustafa Bin Rusli
- Nationality: Malaysian
- Born: 5 February 1987 (age 39) Dungun, Terengganu, Malaysia
- Height: 173 cm (5 ft 8 in)

Sport
- Country: Malaysia
- Event: Road cycling
- Club: Majlis Sukan Negara
- Retired: 2018

Amir Mustafa Rusli (born 5 February 1987, Kuala Dungun) is a Malaysian national cyclist. He competed at the 2012 Summer Olympics in the Men's road race. Amir cycled for Drapac Professional Cycling from 2011 to 2012. He is now a coach for Malaysia Cycling Team (Track endurance and road).

== Honours ==
- Terengganu :
  - Recipient of the Meritorious Service Medal (PJK) (2012)
