= LeTua Cycling Team =

Malaysian cycling team

Team information
- UCI code: L2A
- Registered: Malaysia
- Founded: 2004
- Discipline: Road
- Status: UCI Continental Team

Key personnel
- General manager: Yassin Shukor

Team name history
- 2007-: LeTua Cycling Team

LeTua Cycling Team (UCI team code: L2A) is a Malaysian UCI Continental cycling team managed by Yassin Shukor and sponsored by PanGlobal Insurance, PowerBar, Merpati, Castrol and Amerstrand Engineering.

== Major wins ==
2007
Stage 3 & 6 Jelajah Malaysia, Anuar Manan
Stage 3 Tour of Siam, Ahmad Haidar Anuawar
Stage 9 Azerbaijan Tour, Anuar Manan
Stage 3b Tour of Hong Kong, Ahmad Haidar Anuawar
Stage 2 Tour of Hainan, Anuar Manan
2008
Overall Jelajah Malaysia, Tonton Susanto

Stage 2, 3 & 5, Anuar Manan

Stage 1 Tour of East Java, Tonton Susanto
Stage 2 Malacca Cup, Anuar Manan
Stage 8 & 11 Tour of Indonesia, Mohamed Ridzuan Zainal
2009
Stage 4 Tour de Langkawi, Samai Samai
Stage 3 & 4 Tour de Hokkaido, Jaan Kirsipuu
Singapore, Road Race Championship, Low Ji Wen
Stage 1 Herald Sun Tour, Jaan Kirsipuu
Stage 6 Tour of Southland, Jeremy Yates
2010
Stage 5 Jelajah Malaysia, Mark O'Brien

== 2011 squad ==
Rider	Date of birth
Muhammad Afiz Azeman (MAS)	2 November 1990 (age 35)
Vidal Celis (ESP)	21 August 1982 (age 44)
Adrian Chuah (MAS)	21 March 1989 (age 37)
Ahmad Syakir Ismail (MAS)	21 November 1989 (age 36)
Muhamad Faiz Mohamad Roslan (MAS)	11 March 1992 (age 34)
Ng Yong Li (MAS)	6 October 1985 (age 40)
Libardo Niño (COL)	26 September 1968 (age 57)

Rider	Date of birth
Miguel Ángel Niño (COL)	25 January 1971 (age 55)
Alexis Rodríguez (ESP)	27 April 1977 (age 49)
Mohammad Omar Rosli (MAS)	5 January 1992 (age 34)
Mohamed Shawal Shafee (MAS)	23 May 1983 (age 43)
Sam Witmitz (AUS)	17 March 1985 (age 41)
Azhar Zulaily (MAS)	31 October 1992 (age 33)
