= Mount Washington Auto Road Bicycle Hillclimb =

Cycle race held in New Hampshire, United States

Coordinates: 44°16′52.9″N 71°16′36.5″W

Race details
- Date: August
- Region: Mt. Washington, New Hampshire, United States
- Discipline: Road race
- Type: One-day race

History
- First edition: 1973
- Editions: 51
- First winner: John Allis (USA)
- Most wins: Tyler Hamilton (USA); Phillip Gaimon (USA) (4 wins each); Aimee Vasse (USA) (5 wins)
- Most recent: Ian Boswell (USA); Illi Gardner (GBR)

The Mount Washington Auto Road Bicycle Hillclimb is an annual American cycle racing event held in New Hampshire. The event raises money for the Tin Mountain Conservation Center, which promotes appreciation of the environment.

== Background ==
In August of each year, up to six hundred riders take part in the race which centers around a 7.6 mile (12.2 km) climb to the top of New Hampshire's Mount Washington—the highest peak in New England. The Mount Washington Auto Road has an average gradient of 12% and reaches gradients of up to 22%.

The race's most famous victor is Tyler Hamilton who got his fourth victory in the race in 2006 in a time of 52:21, beating out Ned Overend by 2:20. Jeannie Longo held the women's record at 58:14 prior to the records being reset in 2022, while Tom Danielson owned the men's record of 49:24 prior to the records being reset in 2022.

In June 2011 Mount Washington Auto Road race organizers announced that the times ridden by Tyler Hamilton of the United States and Genevieve Jeanson of Canada would no longer be considered official records. Both Jeanson and Hamilton admitted to using performance-enhancing drugs throughout their career, which led to the record loss.

As of 2022, the road is completely paved, whereas previously portions of the climb was gravel. The process of paving the road began in the 1970s. Due to the road change, race organizers chose to reset the records in 2022. Because of this, the current male record is 50:15, made by Ian Boswell in 2025, and the current female record is 58:01, made by Illi Gardner in 2025.

== Past winners ==
Year	Men		Women	
1973	(United States) John Allis	1:15:05	Unknown	
1974	(United States) John Allis	1:01:39	Unknown	
1975	Results unknown			
1976	John Howard		Barbara Amburgey	
1977	Mike Hogan	58:24	Ester Salmi	
1978	(Canada) Martin Ernst Bruhn	1:03:21	Unknown	
1979	Steve Pyle	1:01:29	Unknown	
1980	Dale Stetina	0:57:41	Unknown	
1981	Steve Pyle	Unknown	Beth Heiden	1:16:30 (new wm's record)
1982	Matt VonWahzle	1:06:22	Murrie Green	1:14:24 (new wm's record)
1983	Gary Evans		Unknown	
1984	(United States) Chuck Canfield	1:03:45	Martha Tuttle	1:29:46
1985	(United States) Chuck Canfield	0:59:59	Martha Pitman	1:18:58
1986	(United States) Chuck Canfield	0:28:22	Kathy Swanson	0:31:52 (shortened due to weather)
1987	Dan Works	1:06:20	Kathy Swanson	1:23:12
1988	Dan Works	1:07:48	Debbie Jensen	1:21:31
1989	Tai Roulston	1:10:16	Megan Hayes	1:22:48
1990	Douglas Tanner	1:05:13	Kathy Swanson	1:19:25
1991	(United States) Andrew de Garmo	1:01:30	Mary Serreze	1:24:40
1992	Mike Nelson	1:02:47	Suzy West	1:16:17
1993	(United States) Joe Bucciaglia	1:02:33	Jodi Groesbeck	1:16:51
1994	Race cancelled due to weather			
1995	Race cancelled due to weather			
1996	(United States) Joe Bucciaglia	1:00:30	Marilyn Ruseckas	1:14:19
1997	(United States) Tyler Hamilton	0:51:56	(United States) Marilyn Ruseckas	1:11:38
1998	(United States) Robert Dapice	0:59:19	(United States) Dorrie Martell	1:11:56
1999	(United States) Tyler Hamilton	0:50:21	(Canada) Geneviève Jeanson	1:01:57
2000	(United States) Tim Johnson	0:55:46	(France) Jeannie Longo	0:58:14 (record)
2001	(United States) Tim Johnson	0:53:31	(Germany) Karen Bockel	1:09:20
2002	(United States) Tom Danielson	0:49:24 (record invalidated in 2011)	(Canada) Geneviève Jeanson	0:54:02 (record invalidated in 2011)
2003	(United States) Tom Danielson	0:51:05	(Canada) Geneviève Jeanson	0:59:58
2004	(United States) Justin England	0:58:50	(United States) Aimee Vasse	1:10:44
2005	(United States) Tyler Hamilton	0:51:11	(United States) Aimee Vasse	1:12:38
2006	(United States) Tyler Hamilton	0:52:21	(United States) Aimee Vasse	1:08:31
2007	Race cancelled due to weather			
2008	(United States) Phillip Gaimon	0:54:57	(Brazil) Flavia Lepene	1:08:52
2009	(United States) Phillip Gaimon	0:54:37	(Canada) Sue Schlatter	1:07:43
2010	(United States) Nico Toutenhoofd	0:57:26	(United States) Marti Shea	1:05:42
2011	(United States) Ned Overend	0:55:03	(United States) Marti Shea	1:04:12
2012	(United States) Cameron Cogburn	0:52:28	(United States) Marti Shea	1:03:14
2013	(United States) Cameron Cogburn	0:50:48	(United States) Silke Wunderwald	1:09:56
2014	(Denmark) John Kronborg Ebsen	0:52:53	(United States) Marti Shea	1:06:01
2015	(United States) Eneas Freyre	0:53:00	(Canada) Véronique Fortin	1:05:58
2016	(United States) Eneas Freyre	0:52:10	(United States) Victoria DiSavino	1:07:32
2017	(United States) Phillip Gaimon	0:52:10	(United States) Aimee Vasse	1:07:32
2018	(United States) Barry Miller	0:53:34	(United States) Aimee Vasse	1:04:05
2019	(United States) Erik Levinsohn	0:53:42	(United States) Stefanie Sydlik	1:10:32
2020	Race canceled due to COVID-19			
2021	(United States) Erik Levinsohn	0:51:59	(United States) Aimee Vasse	1:13:24
2022	(United States) Phillip Gaimon	0:50:38	(United States) Courtney Nelson	1:09:35
2023	Race cancelled due to weather			
2024	(United States) Cameron Cogburn	0:52:01	(United States) Kristen Kulchinsky	1:06:08
2025	(United States) Ian Boswell	0:50:15 (Record)	(United Kingdom) Illi Gardner	0:58:01 (Record)

== See also ==
- Mount Washington Hillclimb Auto Race
- Mount Washington Road Race
