= Team Florida =

Team Florida may refer to:

- Team Florida (AAFL), American football team in the All American Football League
- Team Florida (Cycling), University of Florida Cycling Club
- Team Florida (inline skating), Inline speed skating team sanctioned by USA Roller Sports
