= John Ebsen =

Danish cyclist

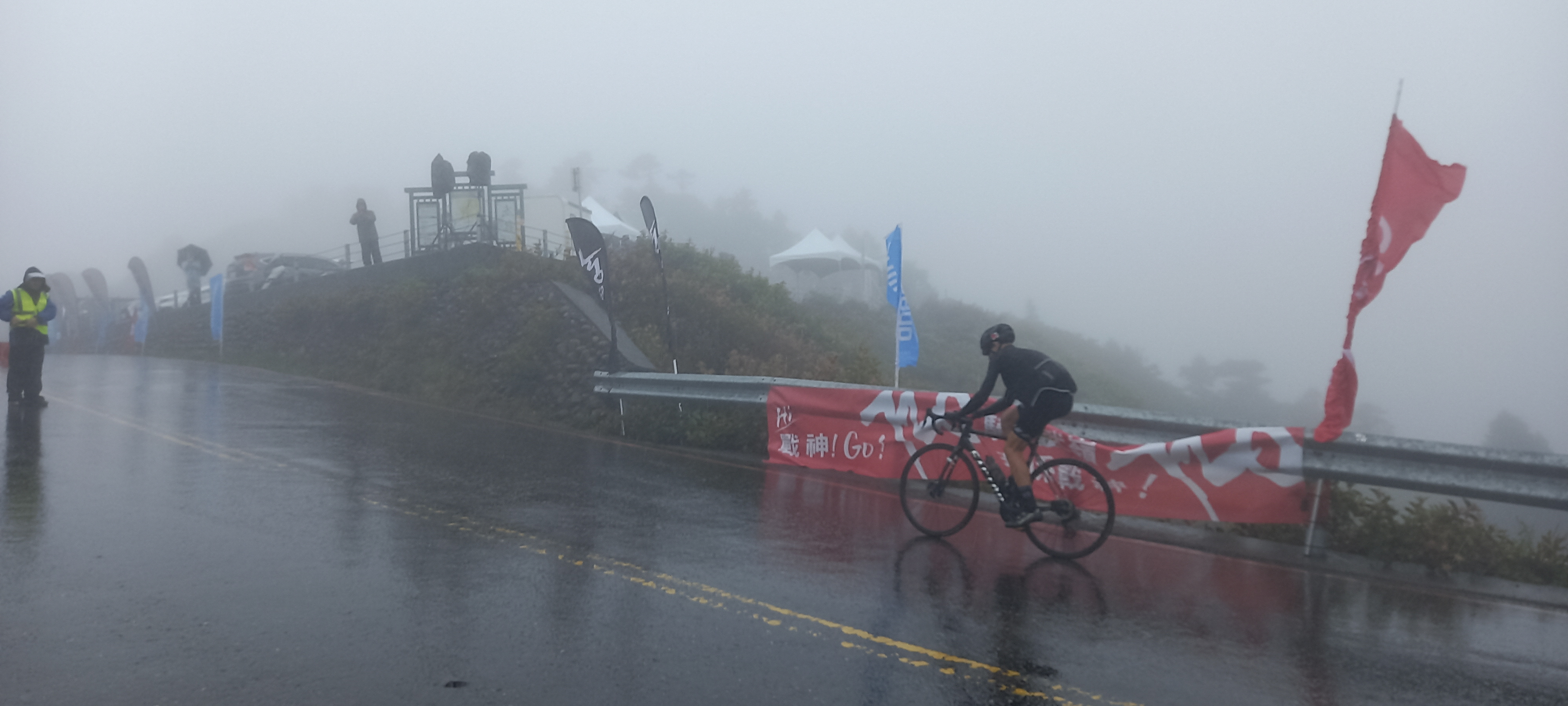
- 1st Taiwan K.O.M. Challenge 2020

Personal information
- Full name: John Bohn Ebsen Kronborg
- Born: 15 November 1988 (age 37)
- Height: 1.76 m (5 ft 9 in)
- Weight: 58 kg (128 lb; 9.1 st)

Cycling career
- Sport: Cycling
- Current team: Retired
- Discipline: Road
- Role: Rider
- Rider type: Climber

Amateur teams
- 2010: Crédito Agrícola
- 2011: AC Lanester 56
- 2012: J.Jensen–Sandstød Salg og Event

Professional teams
- 2012: CCN
- 2013: Synergy Baku
- 2014: CCN
- 2015: Androni Giocattoli
- 2016: ONE Pro Cycling
- 2017: Infinite AIS Cycling Team
- 2018: Forca Amskins Racing

John Bohn Ebsen Kronborg (born 15 November 1988) is a Danish former professional cyclist, who rode professionally between 2012 and 2018. He still competes as an amateur, notably in the Taiwan KOM Challenge, which he has won five times.

== Major results ==
2012
1st Taiwan KOM Challenge
5th Overall Tour of Thailand

1st Mountains classification

6th Overall Tour de Singkarak

1st Stage 4

2013
2nd Overall Tour de Ijen
3rd Overall Tour de Filipinas
5th Overall Tour de East Java

1st Stage 3

6th Overall Tour of Borneo
8th Overall Tour de Langkawi
9th Melaka Governor's Cup
2014
1st Miaoli District Club Race
1st Mount Washington Auto Road Bicycle Hillclimb
1st Taiwan KOM Challenge
2nd Overall Tour de East Java
4th Overall Tour de Filipinas
2017
1st Mountains classification Tour de Langkawi
3rd Taiwan KOM Challenge
2018
1st Taiwan KOM Challenge
5th Overall Tour de Filipinas
2019
8th Taiwan KOM Challenge
2020
1st Taiwan KOM Challenge
2022
1st Taiwan KOM Challenge
