= Phil Gaimon =

American racing cyclist

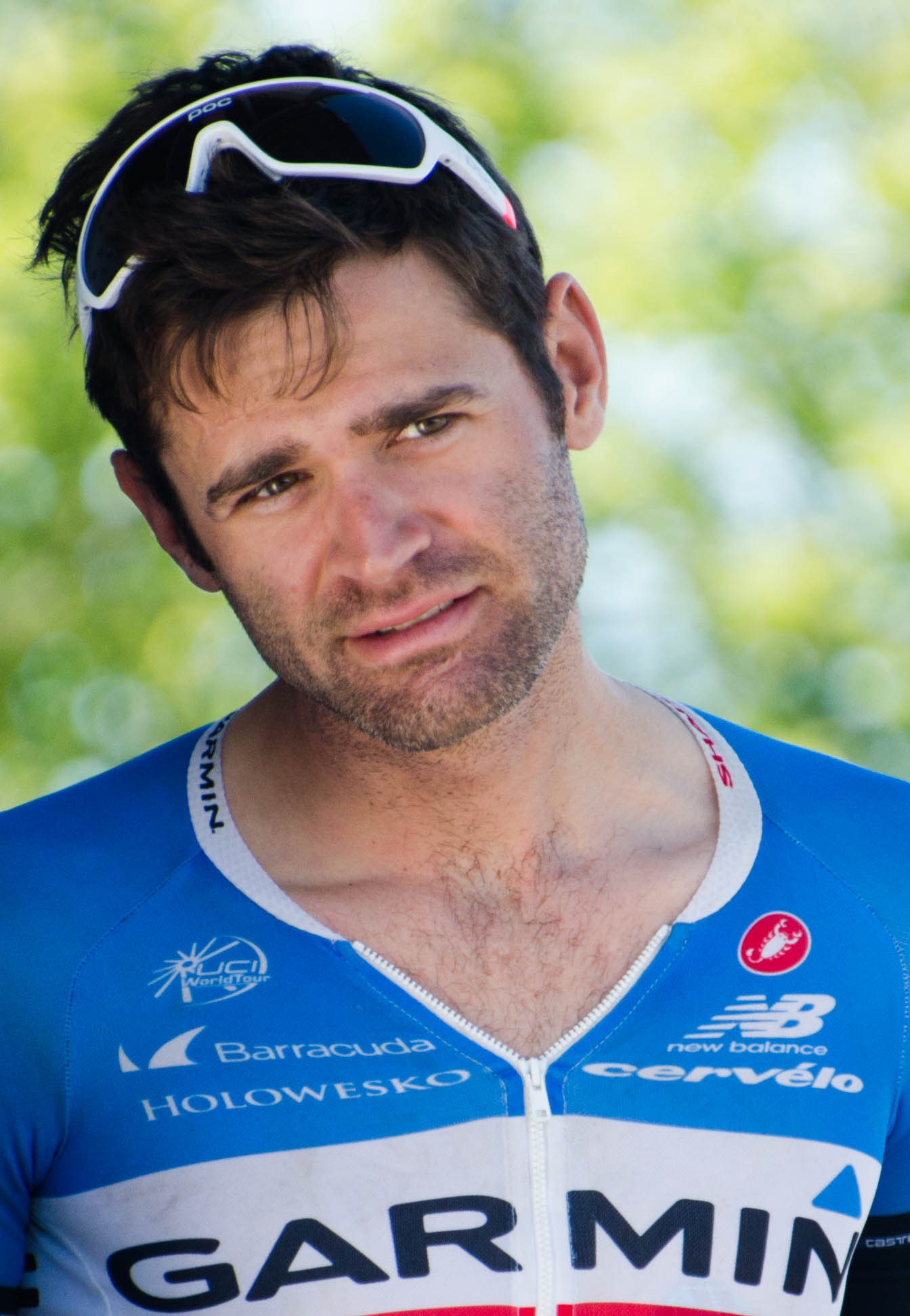
- Gaimon at the 2014 Tour of Alberta

Personal information
- Full name: Phillip Gaimon
- Nickname: Cookie Monster
- Born: January 28, 1986 (age 40) Columbus, Ohio, U.S.
- Height: 1.85 m (6 ft 1 in)
- Weight: 67 kg (148 lb)

Cycling career
- Sport: Cycling
- Discipline: Road
- Role: Rider
- Rider type: All-rounder/climber

Amateur teams
- 2005: AG Edwards
- 2006: VMG Racing
- 2007: CRCA/Sakonnet Technology U25
- 2008–2009: Fiordifrutta
- 2022–: Jukebox Cycling

Professional teams
- 2009: Jelly Belly Cycling Team
- 2010–2012: Kenda–Gear Grinder
- 2013: Bissell
- 2014: Garmin–Sharp
- 2015: Optum–Kelly Benefit Strategies
- 2016: Cannondale

Major wins
- Stage races Redlands Bicycle Classic (2012, 2015) One-day races and Classics USA Cycling Hillclimb National Championship (2017)

Phillip Gaimon (born January 28, 1986) is an American former professional road racing cyclist, who rode professionally between 2009 and 2016. He is currently part of Jukebox Cycling, a multi-discipline team of six riders. He began his racing career while attending the University of Florida and competed in collegiate races as part of the University's Cycling Club. As a professional, Gaimon rode for Jelly Belly Cycling Team, Kenda–5-hour Energy, Bissell, Optum–Kelly Benefit Strategies and Cannondale–Drapac. A noted blogger, Gaimon has written for VeloNews; he formerly posted at Bicycling, ESPN, and Sports Illustrated.

== Career ==
Gaimon was born in Columbus, Ohio, United States and spent his adolescence in Atlanta. As of 2026, Gaimon resides in Los Angeles, United States.

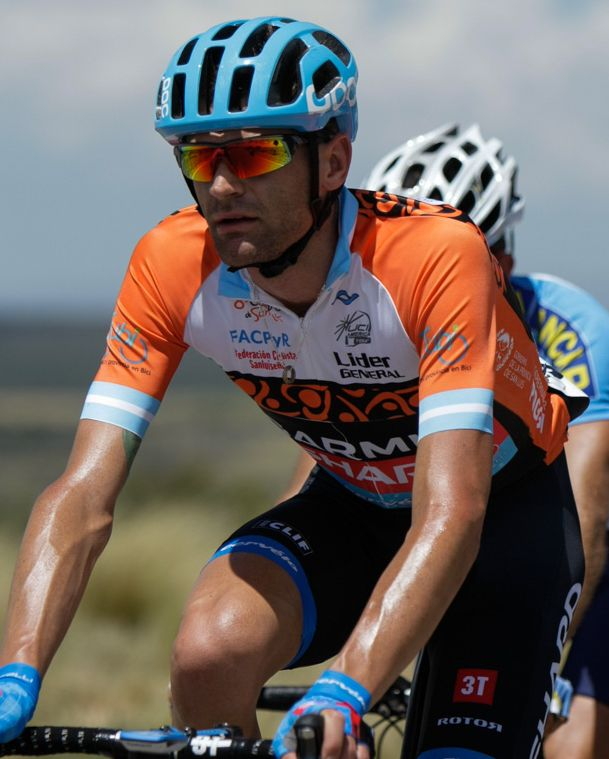
Gaimon at the 2014 Tour de San Luis

After five seasons competing domestically with the Jelly Belly Cycling Team, Kenda–Gear Grinder and Bissell teams, Gaimon signed with the Garmin–Sharp squad for the 2014 season. Gaimon won his very first race with his new team, stage 1 of the 2014 Tour de San Luis, and managed to hold on throughout the race to finish second overall, behind Nairo Quintana, who claimed the leader's jersey during an individual time trial. Gaimon went back to the American scene in 2015, riding for Optum–Kelly Benefit Strategies on a one-year contract. After riding the 2015 season at UCI Continental level, Gaimon announced he would be returning to the World Tour with Cannondale for 2016. Gaimon announced his retirement at the end of 2016. In June 2019, while training for the 2020 Olympics in the Team pursuit, Gaimon suffered a serious crash breaking his collarbone, scapula, 5 ribs, and partially collapsing a lung.

Gaimon began authoring books during his professional career, including Pro Cycling on $10 a Day: From Fat Kid to Euro Pro, which was released in 2014 by VeloPress. He continued writing in retirement, including 2017's Ask a Pro: Deep Thoughts and Unreliable Advice from America's Foremost Cycling Sage (also published by VeloPress) and Draft Animals: Living the Pro Cycling Dream (Once in a While) released by Penguin Books. Gaimon also hosts a weekly podcast called The Peloton Brief and an annual charity event ride in Simi Valley, California called Phil's Cookie Fondo.

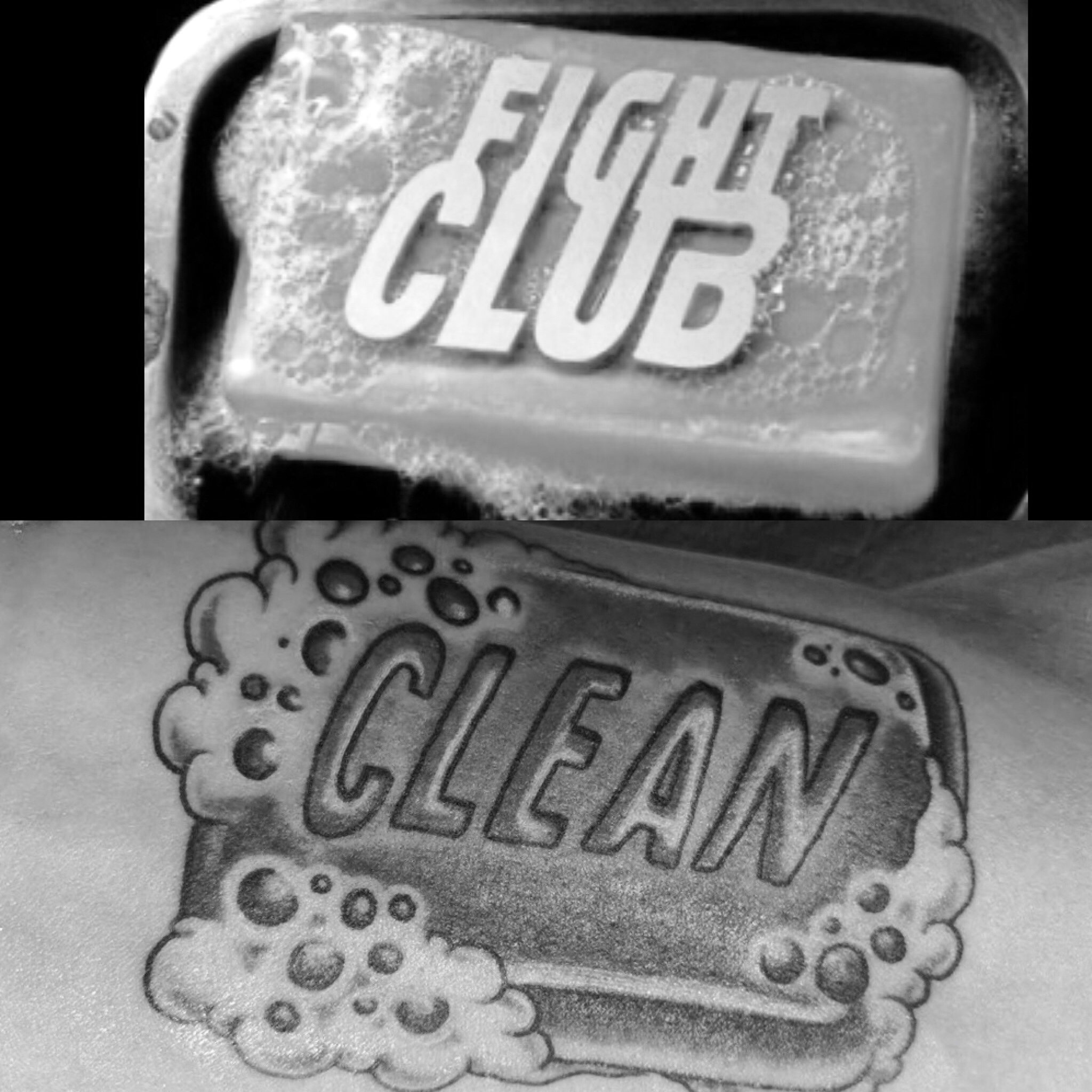
"The first rule of Fight Club is: you do not talk about Fight Club." Fight Club film 1999. Soap bar logo from movie poster. (above) Cyclist Phil Gaimon's "clean" tattoo (below).

Gaimon is vocal about performing without performance-enhancing drugs, and commissioned a tattoo of a bar of soap with the word "CLEAN" on his right bicep. Since retiring from participating in professional event brands, Gaimon has generated social media engagement by attempting to beat "king-of-the-mountain" (KOM) records on the digital app Strava. He also has created a video series called "Worst Retirement Ever" of his KOM attempts on YouTube.

In 2022 Gaimon became part of the newly formed Jukebox Cycling team.

== Major results ==
2006
8th Overall Tour of the Bahamas
2007
7th Univest Grand Prix

1st Youth classification

2008
1st Mount Washington Hillclimb
2009
1st Mount Washington Hillclimb
2010
2nd Overall Tour de Taiwan
2011
6th Overall Tour de Beauce
8th Overall Cascade Cycling Classic
2012
1st Overall Redlands Bicycle Classic

1st Stage 1 (ITT)

4th Overall Cascade Cycling Classic
2013
2nd Overall Tour of the Gila
6th Overall Cascade Cycling Classic

1st Stage 1

2014
2nd Overall Tour de San Luis

1st Stage 1

2015
1st Overall Redlands Bicycle Classic
2017
1st USA Cycling Hill Climb National Championship
1st Mount Washington Hillclimb
2022
1st Overall (with new official record of 50:38) Mount Washington Hillclimb

== Bibliography ==
- Gaimon, Phil (2014). Pro Cycling on $10 a Day: From Fat Kid to Euro Pro. Boulder, Colorado: VeloPress. ISBN 978-1-937715-24-3.
- Gaimon, Phil (2017). Ask a Pro: Deep Thoughts and Unreliable Advice from America's Foremost Cycling Sage. Boulder, Colorado: VeloPress. ISBN 978-1-937715-72-4.
- Gaimon, Phil (2017). Draft Animals: Living the Pro Cycling Dream (Once in a While). New York: Penguin Books. ISBN 978-0-1431312-4-3.
