= John Allis =

American cyclist

Personal information
- Full name: John Cotton Allis
- Born: May 31, 1942 (age 84) Boston, Massachusetts, U.S.
- Height: 5 ft 8 1/2 in (174 cm)
- Weight: 148 lb (67 kg)

Cycling career
- Sport: Cycling
- Discipline: Road
- Role: Rider

Amateur teams
- Century Road Club
- 1964: ACBB

John Cotton Allis (born May 31, 1942) is an American cyclist who entered into international road cycling competition in the 1960s. He was one of the strongest competitive cyclists in the United States in the early 1970s, winning the United States National Road Race Championships in 1974. He is an inductee of the United States Bicycling Hall of Fame.

== Biography ==
Born in Boston, Massachusetts, Allis began racing while a student at Princeton University, and had not yet graduated when he led three of his Princeton teammates to compete in the world road championships in Ronse, Belgium. The team performed poorly in the road race, but better in the time trial, where they took 20th place. This was the first American presence in international cycling competition since the era of Major Taylor.

Allis stayed to race in Europe when his teammates returned to the United States, signing on as a category 1 amateur with the Paris club, AC Boulogne-Billancourt (ACBB). He was the first English speaker to ride for the team.

Despite the skepticism of French cycling enthusiasts, who informed him that Americans were biologically unfit to compete, Allis did achieve victories, including Paris to Cayeux-sur-Mer in 1964. The team was so surprised to see their American rider win that they had to scramble to find him a clean jersey to wear on the podium; he had been given the worst one in the shop. His victory was covered in L'Équipe and mentioned in The New York Times.

Allis returned home to complete his Princeton degree. In the fall of his senior year, he participated in the 1964 Olympics in Tokyo, the first of three Games he competed in. After placing fourth in trials in Central Park, he was selected for the men's individual road race, but was under academic probation and the school almost declined to allow him to attend. However, somebody pointed out to the administration that Harvard and Yale each had two Olympians that year and that, without Allis, Princeton would have had only one (Bill Bradley). Allis produced the best American result in the event that year, 70th out of 126 riders. In the spring of 1965, he placed second in the national collegiate road championship. Allis also raced in the team time trial in the 1968 Olympics in Mexico City and the road race at the 1972 Olympics in Munich, where he took 63rd. In 2005, Allis said that his failure to gain success at the Olympics was the biggest disappointment of his career.

After a brief stint in the Army, Allis shone in American racing in the early 1970s, organizing along with Dave Chauner the Raleigh team that dominated American racing, and winning the national road championship in 1974, which he won by applying brutal tactics against the newcomer Tommy Officer, the 175-mile (282 km) Quebec-Montreal race in 1973, and two runnings of the Mount Washington Auto Road Bicycle Hillclimb. He retired from national competition in 1976.

Allis achieved all his victories as an amateur. He later recounted that in 1969 he raised the possibility of turning professional with ACBB, but they told him he was too old. He was inducted into the United States Bicycling Hall of Fame in 1993.

As of 2005, Allis lived in Belmont, Massachusetts, where he was a partner at a local bike store, and had been working with the Harvard University cycling team for over 20 years. As of 2022, Allis lives in Dublin, New Hampshire.

== See also ==
- List of Princeton University Olympians

== Other sources ==
- The Ride magazine, issue 103, 2002
- History of the Princeton Cycling Team
- Outside magazine, September 2004
- conversations with John Allis, 1992
