= Taiwan KOM Challenge =

Annual cycle race in Taiwan

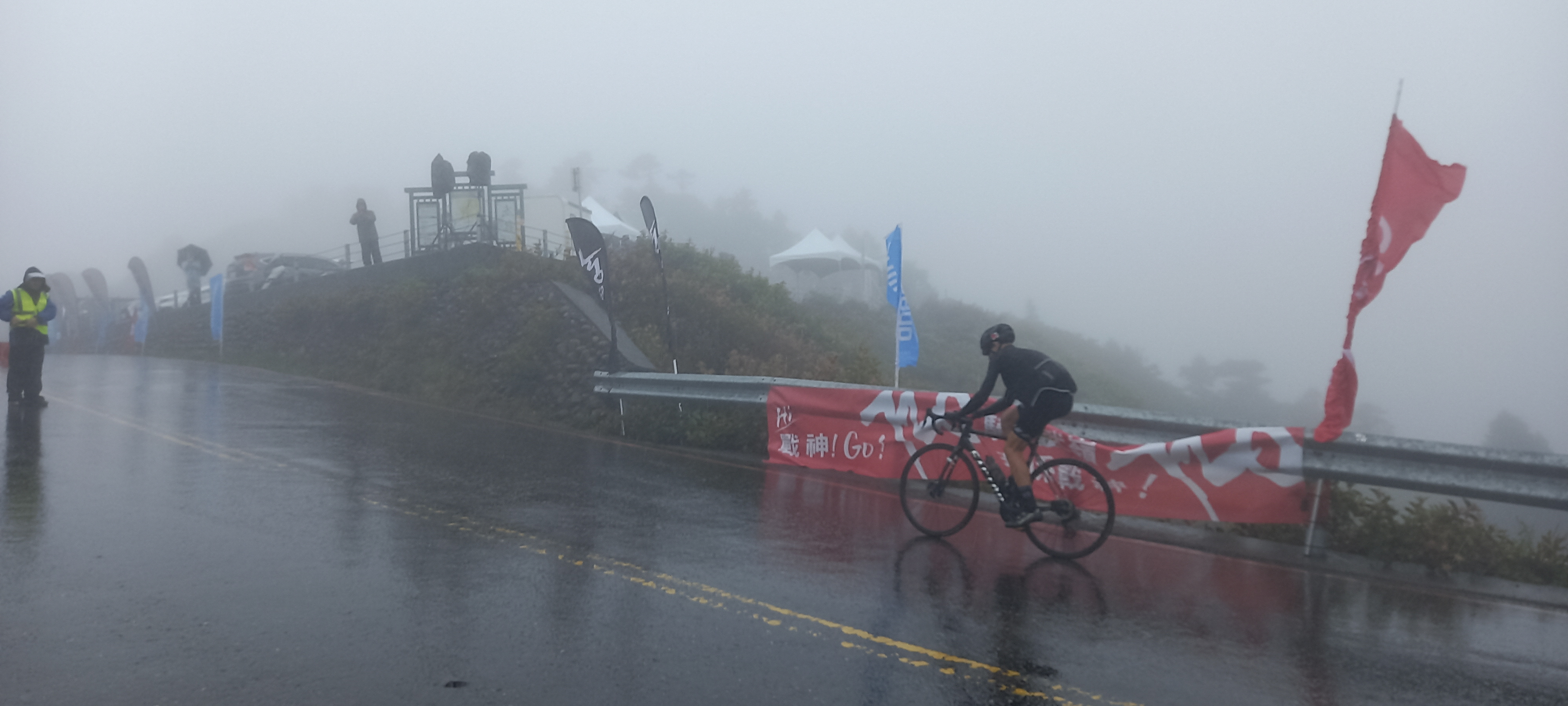
- John Ebsen in the 2020 edition, which he won

Race details
- Date: October/November
- Region: Taiwan (Qixingtan Beach -> Wuling)
- Local name: 臺灣自行車登山王挑戰 (in Chinese)
- Discipline: Road
- Type: One-day race
- Organiser: Taiwan Cycling Federation
- Web site: www.taiwankom.org/en/

History
- First edition: 2012
- Editions: 13 (as of 2025)
- First winner: John Ebsen (DEN)
- Most wins: John Ebsen (DEN) (5 wins)
- Most recent: Feng Chun-kai (TWN)

History (women)
- First winner: Eri Yonamine (JPN)
- Most wins: Eri Yonamine (JPN); Emma Pooley (GBR) (2 wins)
- Most recent: Shoko Kashiki (JPN)

The Taiwan KOM Challenge is a one-day road cycling race held annually in Taiwan. Created in 2012, the event is recognized as one of the most difficult cycling races in the world due having nearly 3500m of climbing over a 105 kilometer course. Vincenzo Nibali, the 2017 winner, holds the record for the fastest time, with a time of 3:19:54.

== Route ==
The route starts in the coastal eastern city of Hualien at around sea level, heads north on Highway 9, and turns left into Highway 8, where it enters Tarako National Park, which is a deep gorge. The route gradually gains elevation as it goes westwards, ultimately ending above the clouds in Wuling, near Mt Heuhansan, which at 3275m (10,744 ft) is the highest paved road in Taiwan. Because of the significant increase in elevation, altitude sickness is a concern as well as the sudden change in temperature and weather.

== Winners ==
=== Men ===
Year	Winner	Second	Third
2012	(Denmark) John Ebsen	(France) Peter Pouly	(Republic of Ireland) David McCann
2013	(Iran) Rahim Ememi	(Iran) Amir Zargari	(Taiwan) Wang Yin-chih
2014	(Denmark) John Ebsen	(Hong Kong) Ronald Yeung	(Laos) Ariya Phounsavath
2015	(France) Damien Monier	(Denmark) John Ebsen	(Republic of Ireland) Mark Dowling
2016	(Spain) Óscar Pujol	(Australia) Jai Hindley	(Australia) Ben Dyball
2017	(Italy) Vincenzo Nibali	(Spain) Óscar Pujol	(Denmark) John Ebsen
2018	(Denmark) John Ebsen	(Australia) Ben Dyball	(France) Damien Monier
2019	(Denmark) Anthon Charmig	(Australia) Ben Dyball	(Italy) Pierpaolo Ficara
2020	(Denmark) John Ebsen	(Bulgaria) Christian Trenchev	(Taiwan) Huang Guan-Lin
2021	(Taiwan) Feng Chun-kai	(Taiwan) Lu Shao-hsuan	(Taiwan) Huang Kuan-lin
2022	(Denmark) John Ebsen	(Taiwan) Huang Kuan-lin	(Taiwan) Lu Shao-hsuan
2023	(Australia) Ben Dyball	(Colombia) Jesús David Peña	(Japan) Sohei Kaneko
2024	Race cancelled due to risk of landslides.
2025	(Taiwan) Feng Chun-kai	(Taiwan) Li Guan-xian	(Taiwan) He Yan-yi

=== Women ===
Year	Winner	Second	Third
2013	(Japan) Eri Yonamine	(Australia) Tiffany Cromwell	(Taiwan) Lian Yin Yi Ch
2014	(Canada) Marg Fedyna	(Taiwan) Qin Xin	(Taiwan) Guo Nian Wen
2015	(Japan) Eri Yonamine	(Canada) Marg Fedyna	(Taiwan) Tseng Hsiao-chia
2016	(United Kingdom) Emma Pooley	(Japan) Yumiko Goda	(Taiwan) Cheung Zi Yin
2017	(United Kingdom) Emma Pooley	(United Kingdom) Hayley Simmonds	(United Kingdom) Emily-Grace Collinge
2018	(Australia) Lucy Kennedy	(United Kingdom) Emma Pooley	(France) Edwige Pitel
2019	(South Africa) Ashleigh Moolman	(Netherlands) Marianne Vos	(New Zealand) Kate McIlroy
2020	(Taiwan) Kuo Chia-chi	(Taiwan) Chen Zih-yin	(Switzerland) Sandra Boesiger
2021	(Taiwan) Zeng Ke-xin	(Taiwan) Wang Hsin-hui	(Taiwan) Chen Tzi-yin
2022	(Taiwan) Chiu Xen-xin	(Taiwan) Cheng Shi-xuan	(Taiwan) Wang Xin-hui
2023	(Japan) Shoko Kashiki	(Japan) Tsubasa Makise	(Taiwan) Hsu Shu-wei
2024	Race cancelled due to risk of landslides.

== See also ==
- List of sporting events in Taiwan
