= Aimee Vasse =

American cyclist

Personal information
- Born: July 22, 1978 (age 48)

Cycling career
- Sport: Cycling
- Role: Rider

Aimee Vasse (born July 22, 1978) is an American professional racing cyclist. She signed to ride for the UCI Women's Team Hagens Berman–Supermint for the 2019 women's road cycling season.
