= University of Florida cycling club =

US cycling club

University of Florida Cycling Club
- Predecessor: Gainesville Cycling Club
- Formation: 1985
- Founded at: Gainesville, Florida
- Website: Team Florida

The University of Florida Cycling Club (also known as Team Florida during competitions) is a cycling club and student organization of the University of Florida. The club was established in 1985. The organization has won numerous Southeastern Collegiate Cycling Conference and National Collegiate Cycling Association championships.

== History ==
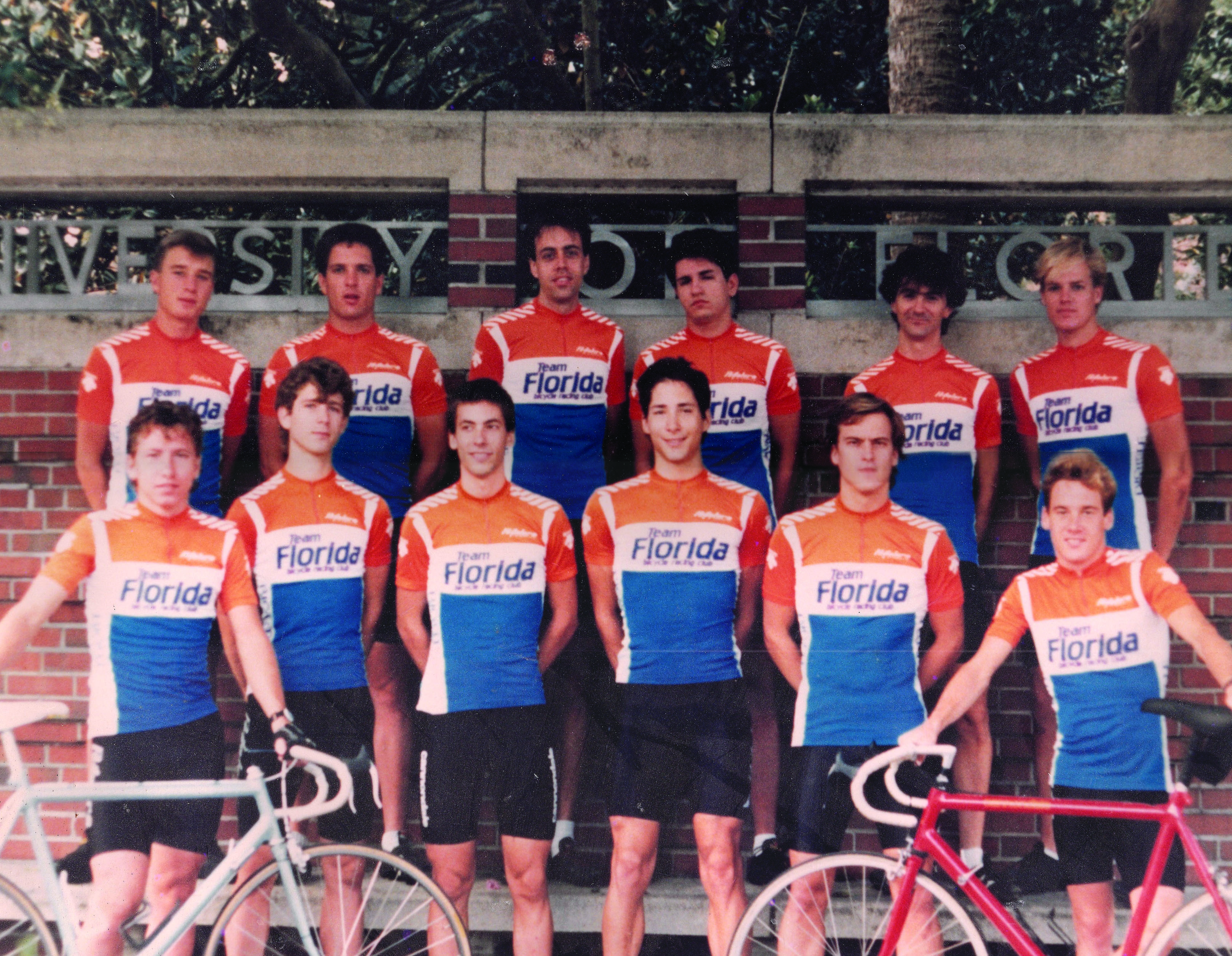
First team photo of the University of Florida Cycling Team, taken in 1986

The first known Cycling Club at the University of Florida was started in the late 1970s by a group of students who began meeting informally for recreational rides. By 1981, they were still meeting, but since almost all had graduated, they changed the group's name to the Gainesville Cycling Club.

In Fall 1985, students of Richard Beck's Cycling Class and other racers organized a separate, university sanctioned bicycle racing sports club, Team Florida. From 1986-1988, with significant funding from student government, and sponsor support from various local and national brands and organizations, the team's top riders competed in pro-am United States Cycling Federation (USCF) races throughout the United States, but primarily within the Southeast. Team Florida joined the Southeastern Collegiate Cycling Conference (SECCC) of the National Collegiate Cycling Association (NCCA) in 1989 and began racing in both USCF and NCCA races.

Team Florida's first participation in an organized race was a Primo Bike Works' 10 mile time trial starting and finishing at the Hopewell Baptist Church on Wacahoota Road Southwest of Gainesville in late 1985 or early 1986. The first Team Florida win was achieved by Paul Chludzinski in a Citizen's Class criterium in Cocoa Beach in spring 1986. The team's first USCF licensed win was secured by Michael Franovich in a Category IV road race on the Sawgrass Expressway, prior to its July 3, 1986 opening. The first collegiate race win was accomplished by Geoff Rogers in a “B” Category Race at the University of Georgia in 1989.

Although bike races had been held on campus as early as the 1950s, the first race hosted by Team Florida was held in Fall 1986. The six turn USCF sanctioned criterium ran clockwise. It featured a start/finish in front of the Florida Gym on Stadium Road, turned right onto North South Drive (now known as Gale Lemerand Drive) pass the stadium, turned right onto East West Drive (turn no longer exists due to North stadium stands construction), from East West Drive right onto Fletcher Drive, left on what was a road between Pugh and Dauer Halls, right onto Buckman Drive which becomes Stadium Road, and past the Hub before returning to the start/finish. Andy Woodruff, who would eventually ride for Team Florida in the early 1990s, won the Men's Pro, 1,2,3 race. Team sponsored circuit races around Lake Alice were held in 1987 and 1988. The first Stage Race was held in 1989 and featured a downtown twilight criterium and a road race on Dungarvin Road.

In 1992, a Team Florida cyclist, Tom Hayes, was killed in an accident while cycling through Paynes Prairie. Team uniforms the following year included a memorial black armband in the cyclist's honor.

Team Florida was recognized as the University of Florida's Sports Club of the Year for 2015-2016. In 2017, with student interest in racing declining, Team Florida leadership chose to have the club focus on noncompetitive recreational riding, the team lost its standing as a sports club, and stopped participating in SECCC events. As of October 2019 however, the team had regained its status as a UF Sports Club. Following a lengthy delay associated with the pandemic, Team Florida began competing in SECCC collegiate races again in Fall 2021. In 2022 Team Florida returned to the top of the SECCC Standings with a conference win for Tyler Austhof in Cyclocross.

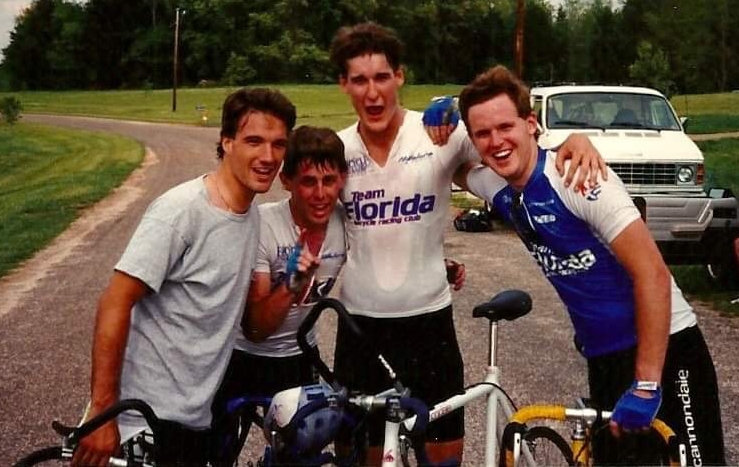
Team Florida participants at the 1989 SECCC Team Time Trial Champions, the first SECCC Championship for the club

== Southeastern Collegiate Cycling Conference Championships ==
=== Road ===
- 1989 Team Time Trial (Phil Huckabee, Tim Hefner, David Suro and Geoff Rogers)
- 1990 Women's A (Julie Maupin)
- 1994 Men's A (Jamie Bennett)
- 1994 Men's C (Dennis Angelo)
- 1996 Team
- 1996 Women's A (Marjon Marik)
- 1996 Men's B (Eric Gerolstein)
- 1996 Men's C (Dave Daniel)
- 1997 Team
- 1997 Women's A (Marjon Marik)
- 1997 Men's A (Saul Yeaton)
- 1997 Men's C (Rob Murray)
- 1998 Team
- 1998 Women's A (Marjon Marik)
- 1998 Men's B (Paul Brushwood)
- 1998 Men's C (Chad Mallory)
- 2000 Team
- 2000 Men's C (Philip Thompson)
- 2001 Team
- 2002 Team
- 2003 Team
- 2004 Team
- 2005 Men's B (Rob Newsom)
- 2006 Women's B (Courtney Dehon)
- 2007 Team D1 Non-varsity Champs
- 2012 Men's A (Neal Shepard)
- 2013 Team
- 2014 Team

=== Mountain Bike ===
- 1999 Team
- 1999 Women's A (Karen Kolinski)
- 1999 Men's B (Victor Gonzalez)
- 1999 Men's C (Javier Barrio)
- 2000 Team
- 2000 Women's A (Karen Kolinski)
- 2000 Men's A (Cody Ward)
- 2001 Team
- 2001 Women's A (Andrea Martin)
- 2001 Men's A (Erik DeKold)
- 2001 Men's C (Austin Gregorzek)
- 2004 Men's A (Ryan Fisher)
- 2004 Women's A (Teresa Garcia)
- 2004 Men's C (Eric Oppenheimer)
- 2005 Team
- 2005 Men's A (Jason Codding)
- 2005 Women's A (Teresa Garcia)
- 2005 Women's B (Natalia Shelton)
- 2005 Men's C (Ian Knabe)
- 2006 Team D1 Non-varsity Champs
- 2006 Women's A (Tracey Wallace)
- 2006 Women's B (Stephanie Sherril)
- 2006 Men's C (Konstantinos Charizanis)
- 2007 Team D1 Non-varsity Champs
- 2007 Men's A (Chris Janiszewski)
- 2007 Men's B (Ian Knabe)
- 2007 Men's C (Brian Fane)
- 2008 Team D1 Non-varsity Champs
- 2009 Team D1 Non-varsity Champs
- 2012 Men's A (Victor Alber)

=== Cyclocross ===
- 2012 Men's A (Dustin White)
- 2013 Men's A (Dustin White)
- 2013 Men's B (Justin Runac)
- 2022 Men's A (Tyler Austhof)
- 2023 Women's A (Mollie Brewer)
- 2023 Team

== National Collegiate Cycling Championships ==
=== Road ===
- 1998 Women's A Criterium (Jody Radkewich)
- 2005 Women's A Overall (Rebecca Larson)
- 2005 Women's A Criterium (Rebecca Larson)
- 2006 Women's A Overall (Rebecca Larson)
- 2007 Women's A Road Race (Rebecca Larson)
- 2009 Men's A Overall (Bobby Sweeting)

=== Track ===
- 1997 Women's A Points Race (Marjon Marik)
- 1998 Men's A Point's Race (Dan Larson)
- 2003 Women's A Sprints (Rebecca McClintock)
- 2003 Women's A 2K Pursuit (Rebecca McClintock)
- 2003 Women's A Overall (Rebecca McClintock)
- 2003 Women's A Italian Pursuit (Rebecca McClintock, Lori Palmer)
- 2003 Men's A Italian Pursuit (Dan Larson, Steve Heal, Marco Verwijs, David Suarez)

== Notable alumni ==
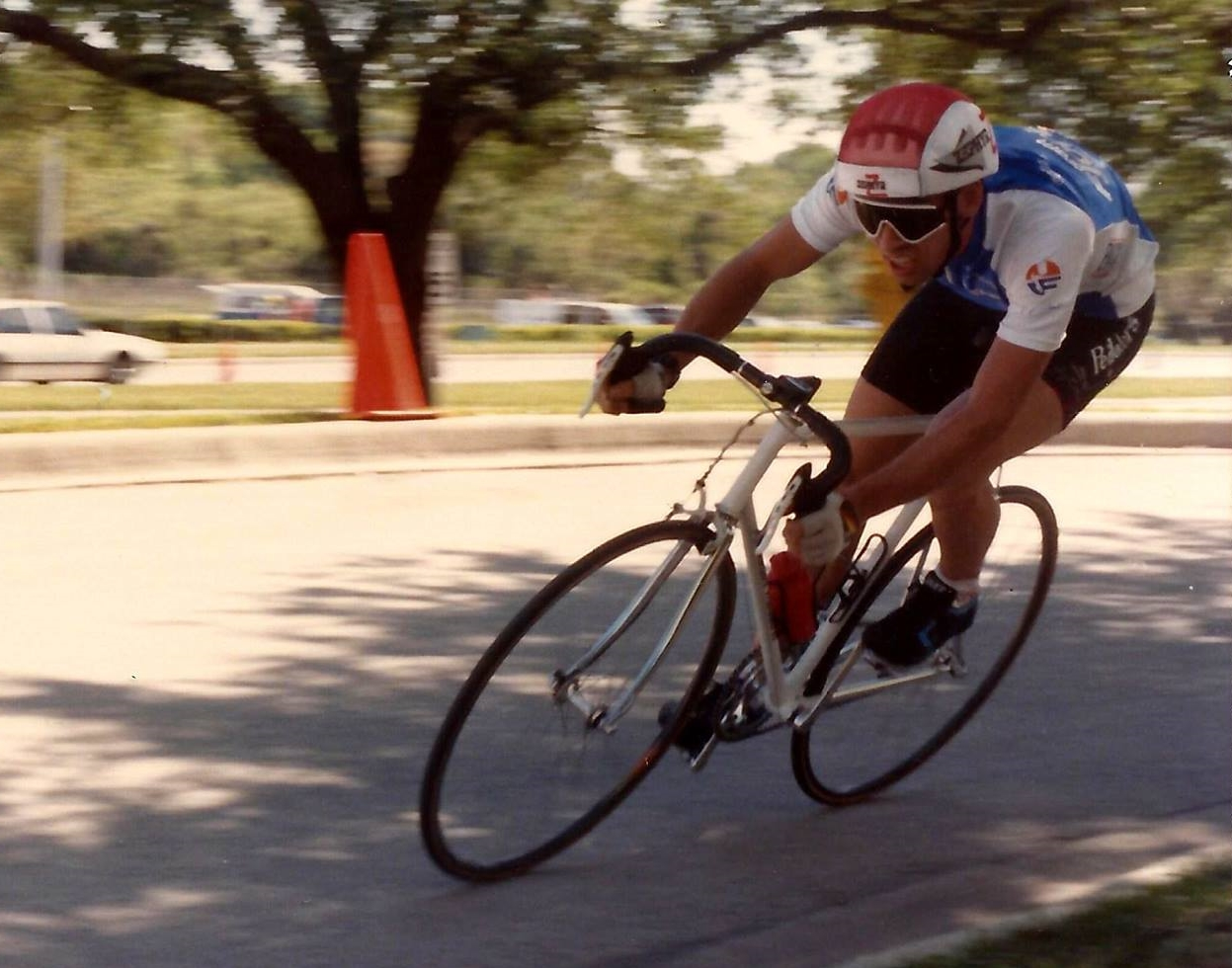
Cyclist John Lieswyn competing for Team Florida

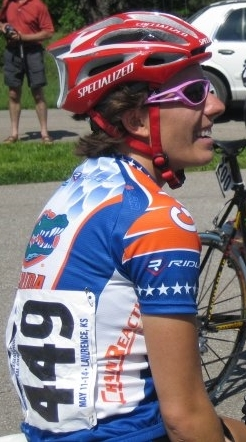
National road champion Rebecca Larson in a Team Florida uniform

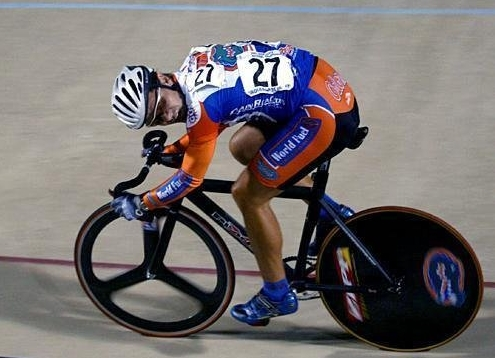
National track champion and club president Dan Larson in club uniform

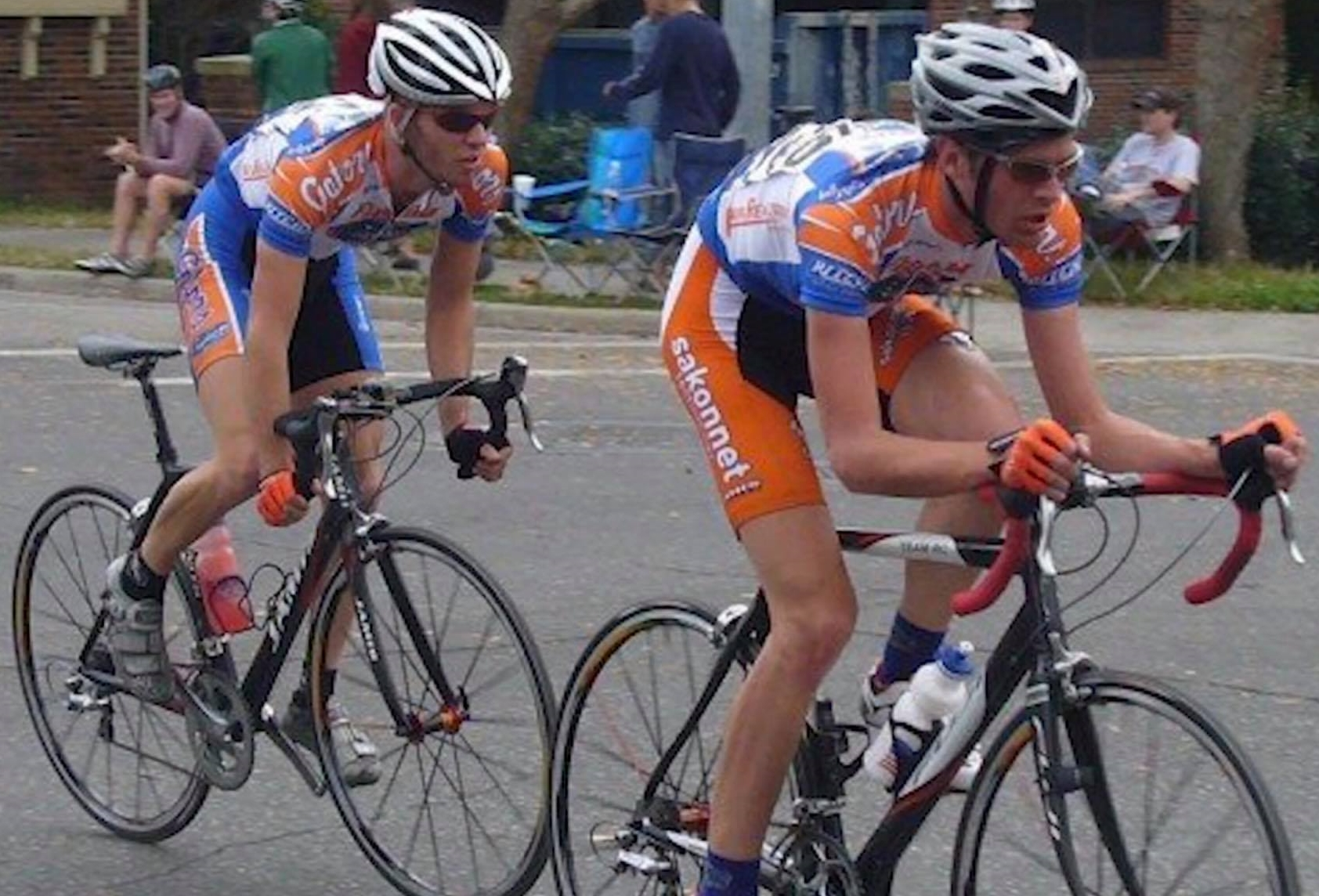
Team Florida cyclists competing

- Karen Bliss - Team Coach (US Bicycling Hall of Fame inductee, Multi time US National Champion)
- Jacquelyn Crowell (Multi time US National Champion)
- Phil Gaimon (World Tour Rider and former Everesting world record holder)
- John Lieswyn (US Professional ITT and TTT Champion, represented the United States 5 times in the UCI Road World Championships Elite Men's Road Race)
- Bobby Livingston - Team Coach (US Olympian)

== Club Presidents ==
- 1985-1986 Thom Cerny
- 1986-1987 J.C. Conte
- 1987-1988 Tony McKnight
- 1988-1989 Kevin Claney
- 1989-1990 Chris Furlow
- 1990-1991 Sean Gregoryck
- 1991-1992 Chris Putman
- 1992-1993 Mike Gann
- 1993 Basil Moutsopolous
- 1994 Phil Weber
- 1994-1995 Jamie Kreminski
- 1995-1996 Matt Mercer
- 1996-1997 Doug Zerbarini
- 1997-1998 Jared Zimlin
- 1998 Dan Larson
- 1998-1999 Eric Gerolstein
- 1999 Chad Mallory
- 2000 Angelo Matthews
- 2000 2001 Erik DeKold
- 2001-2002 Alex Rodriguez
- 2002-2003 Steve Heal
- 2003-2004 J.D. Herlihy
- 2004-2005 Brad Davis
- 2005-2006 Elizabeth Heal
- 2006-2007 Phil Bailey
- 2007-2008 Eric Shields
- 2008-2009 David Reich
- 2009-2010 Thomas Tran
- 2010-2011 Kristin Donahue
- 2011-2012 Derek Schanze
- 2012-2013 Dustin White
- 2013-2014 Chistian Trucco
- 2014-2015 Tony Cofrancesco
- 2015-2016 Maria Hyde
- 2016-2017 Benjamin Matalon
- 2017-2018 Blake Norman
- 2018-2019 Andrew Marques
- 2019-2020 Akram Weheba
- 2020-2021 Akram Weheba
- 2021-2022 Sofia Rodriguez
- 2022-2023 Manuel J Hernandez
- 2023-2024 Tyler Austhof
- 2024-2025 Noah Adelson
- 2025-2026 Noah Adelson

== Gallery ==
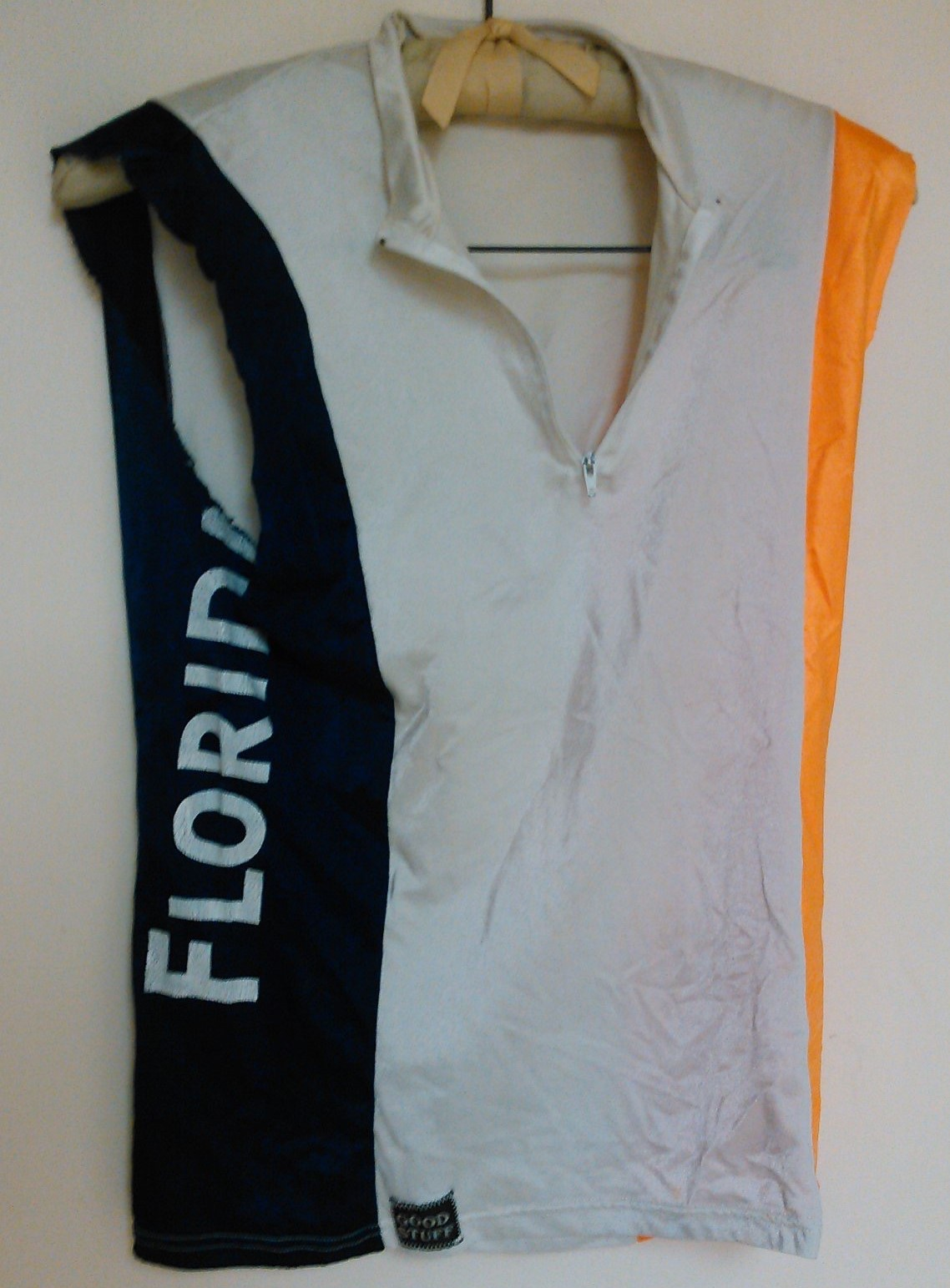
1985 Original Team Florida Jersey (sleeves removed/missing)

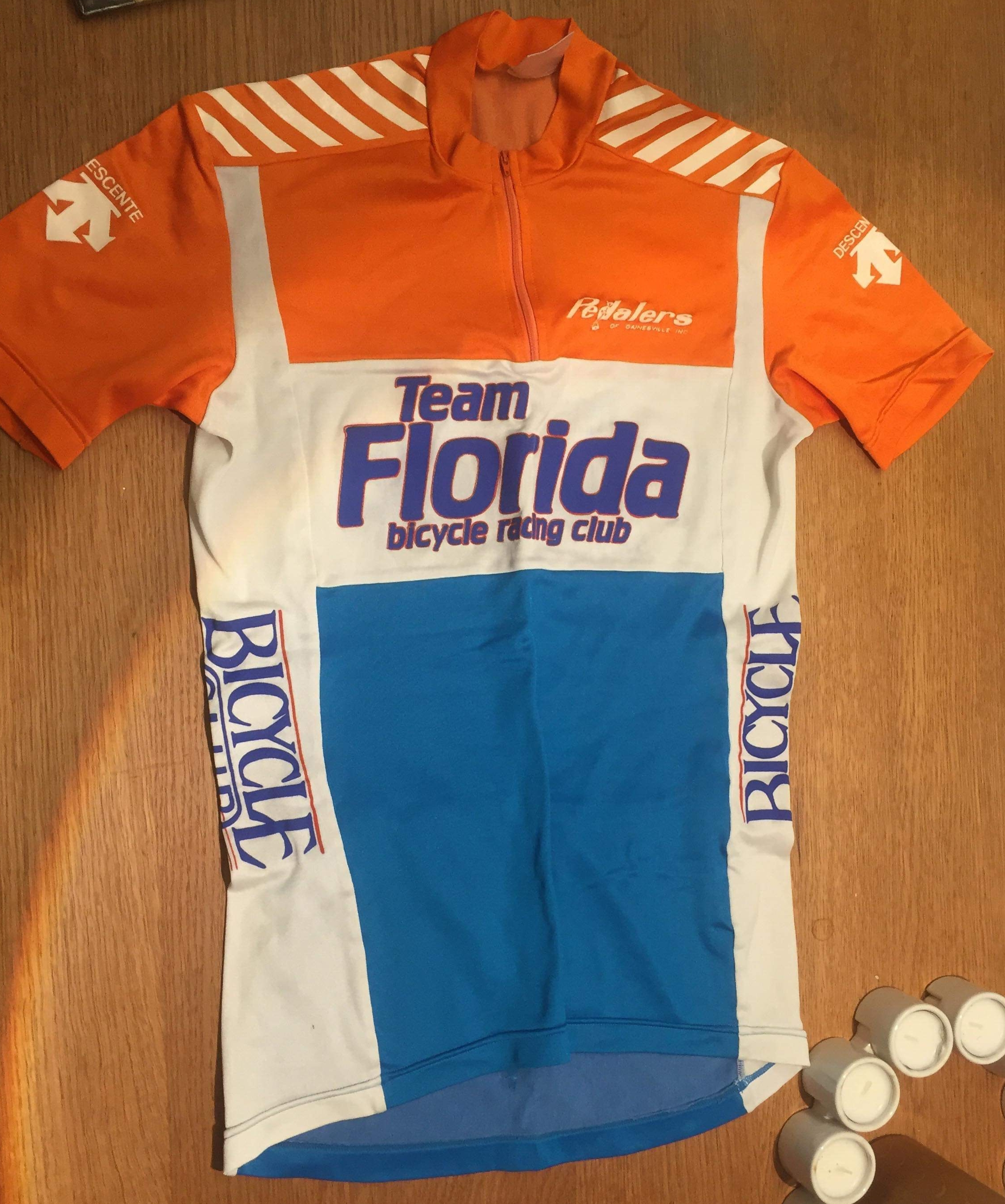
1986 Team Florida Jersey (Bicycle Club Apartments logo was accidentally printed upside down)

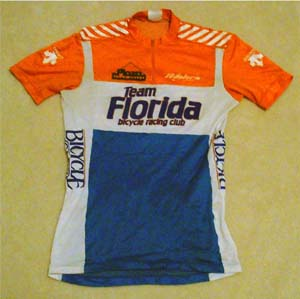
1986-1987 Team Florida "Colorado Summer Road Trip Special" Jersey (includes Plaza at Wood Creek Logo)

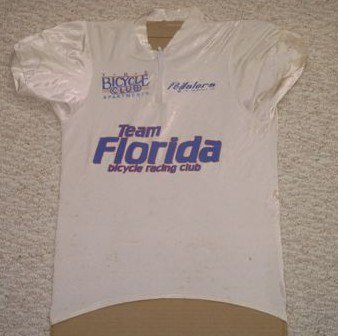
1987 Team Florida Jersey

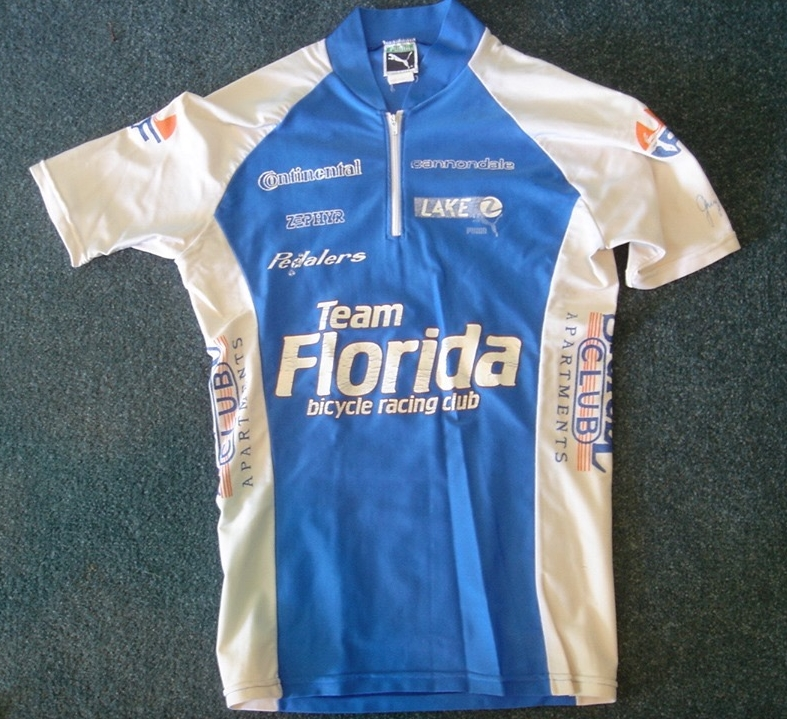
1988 Team Florida Jersey. (First time UF logo was used - sleeves)

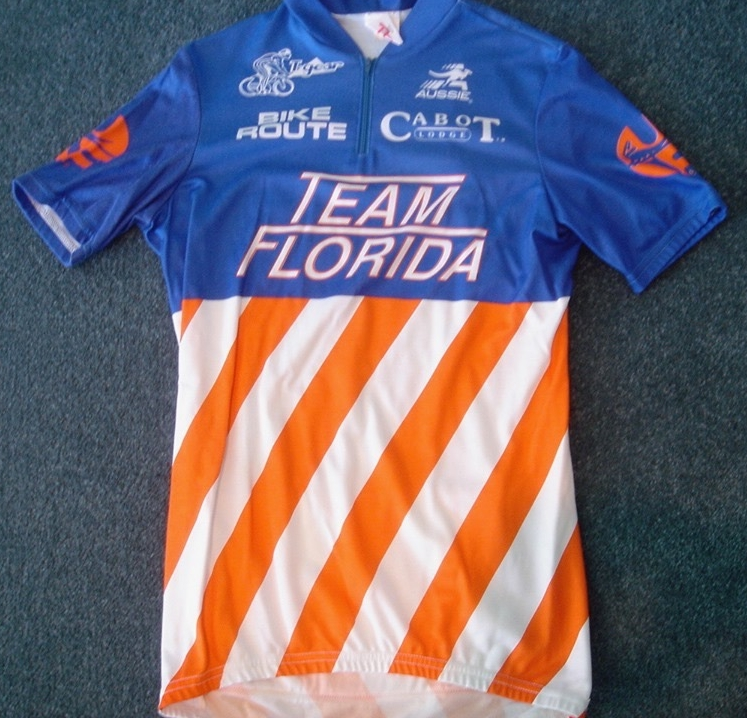
1989 Team Florida Jersey

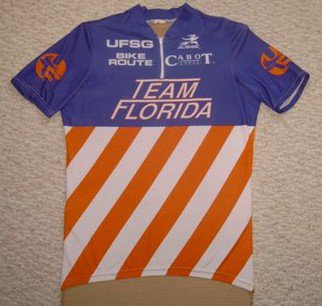
1990 Team Florida Jersey

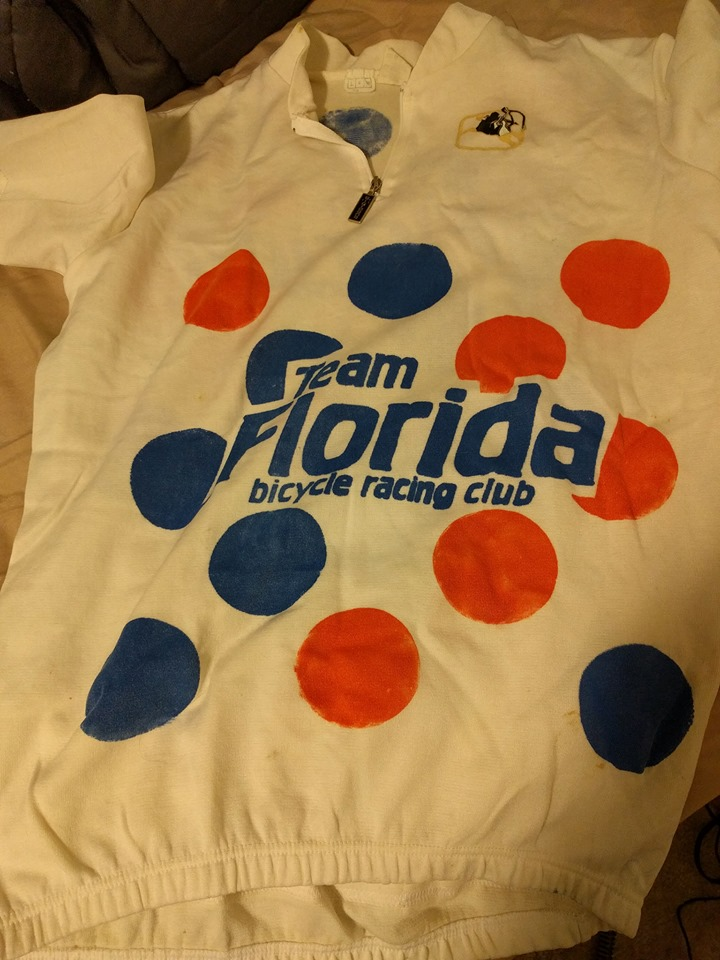
1990-1991 Team Florida Jersey

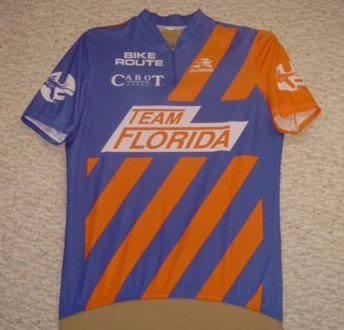
1992 Team Florida Jersey

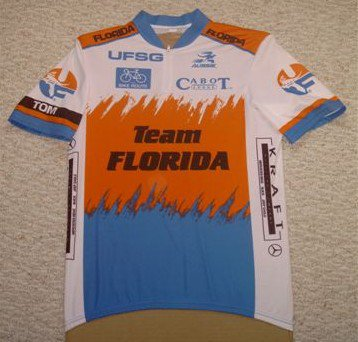
1993 Team Florida Jersey (Note black armband in memory of Tom Hayes who was a student in the College of Health and Human Performance. Hayes was killed while cycling across Payne's Prairie.)

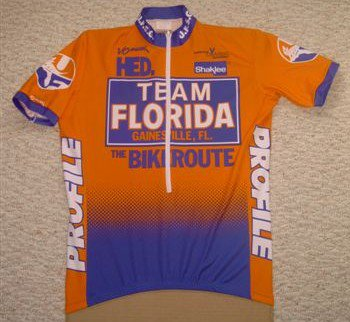
1994 Team Florida Jersey

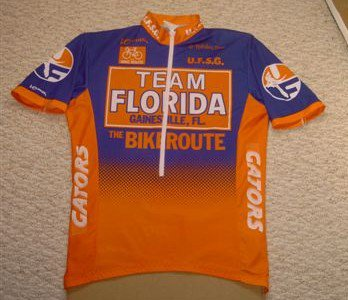
1995 Team Florida Jersey

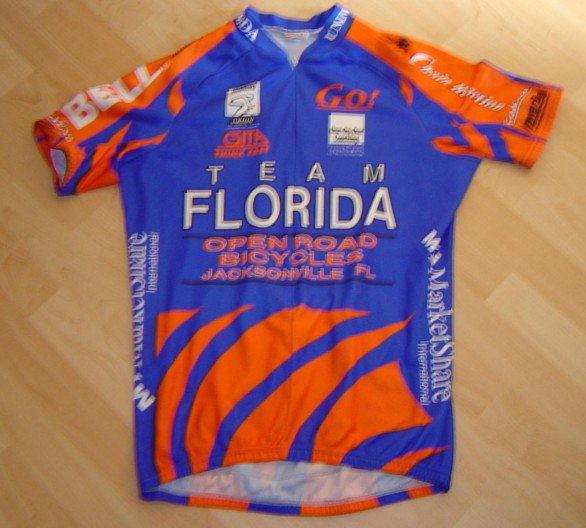
1997 Team Florida Jersey (blurry)

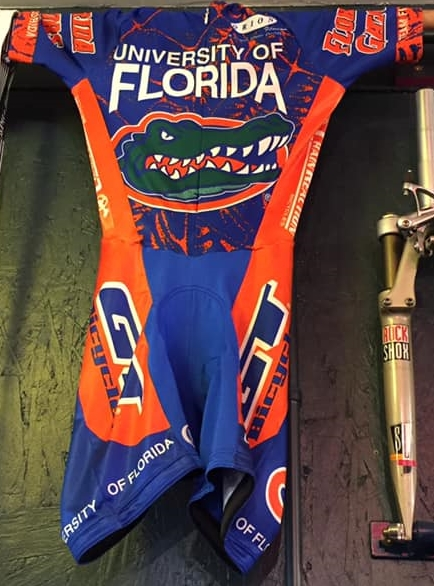
1998-1999 Team Florida Kit

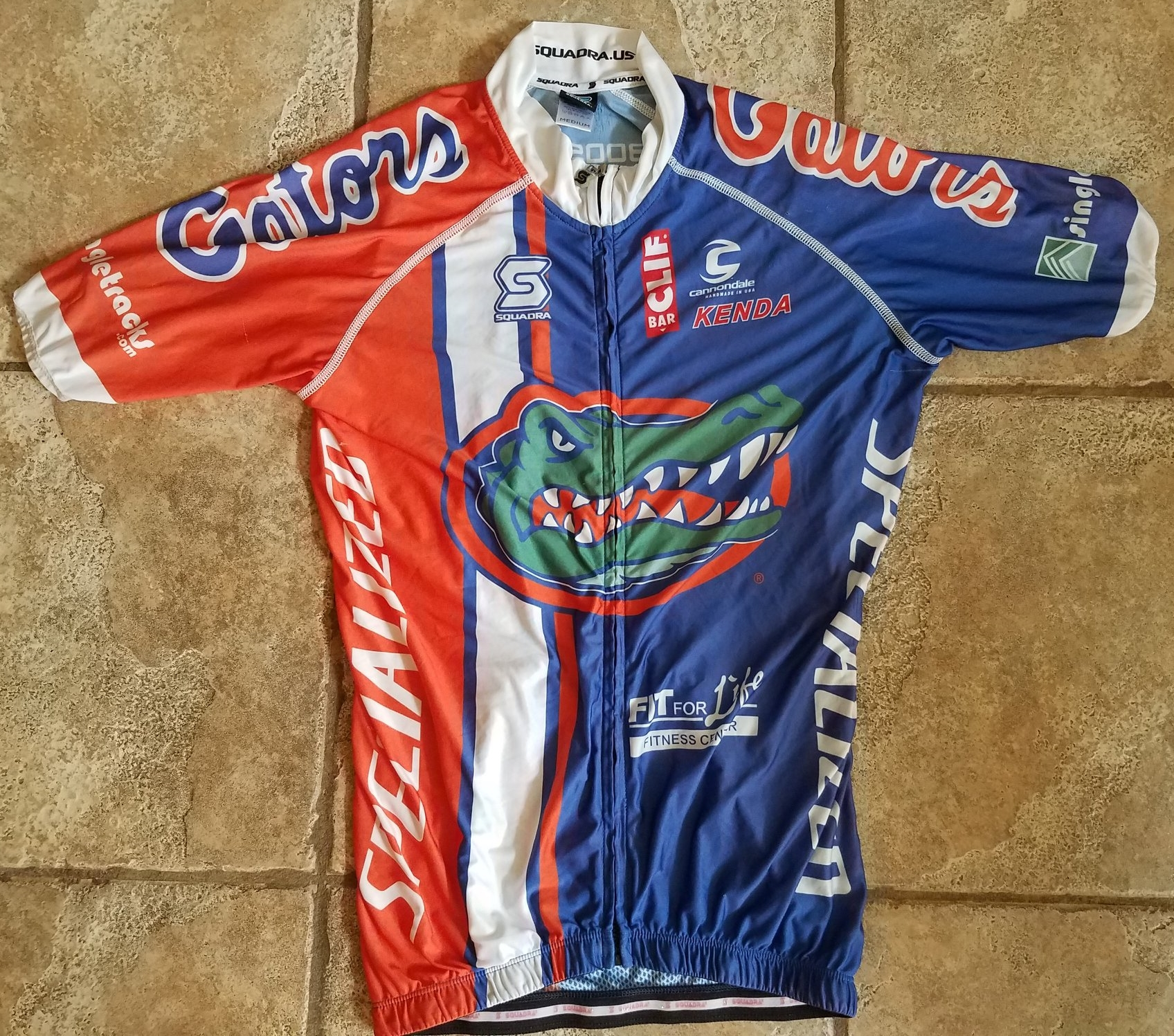
2012-2013 Team Florida Jersey

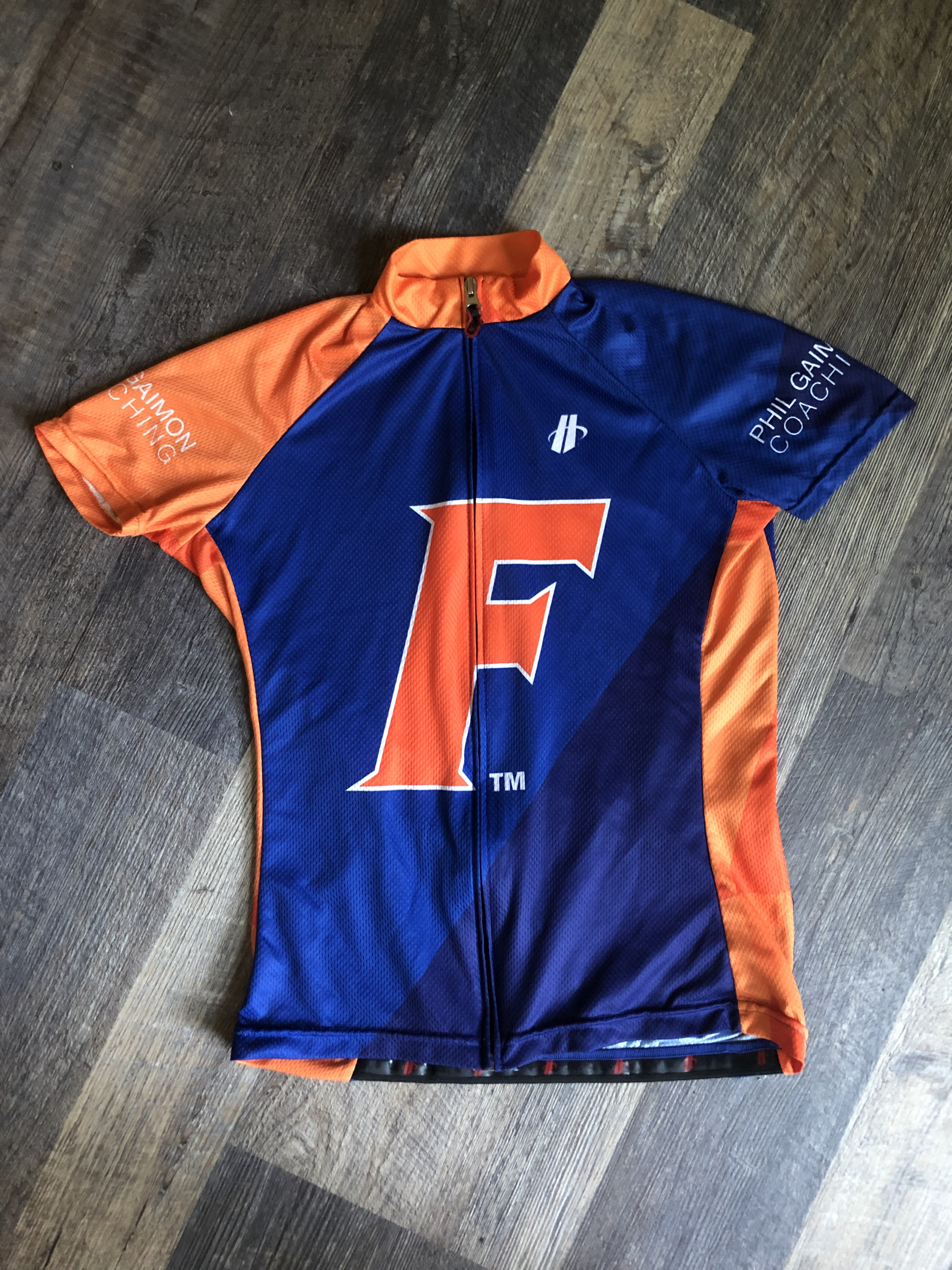
2015-2016 Team Florida Jersey
