= Cameron Cogburn =

American cyclist

Personal information
- Full name: Cameron Valier Cogburn
- Born: April 24, 1986 (age 40) Asheville, North Carolina, United States

Cycling career
- Sport: Cycling
- Current team: Retired
- Disciplines: Road; Mountain biking
- Role: Rider

Professional teams
- 2011: Jelly Belly–Kenda
- 2014: Team SmartStop

Cameron Valier Cogburn (born April 24, 1986) is an American former professional cyclist, who raced professionally with Jelly Belly–Kenda in 2011 and Team SmartStop in 2014. He was a physics Ph.D. candidate at the Massachusetts Institute of Technology before joining SmartStop. He is now a physics professor at Rensselaer Polytechnic Institute.

== Major results ==
2011
9th Overall Tour de Toona

1st Mountains classification

2012
1st Mt. Washington Hillclimb
1st Newton's Revenge
2013
1st Road race, National Collegiate Road Championships
1st Overall Green Mountain Stage Race

1st Stage 1

1st Overall Mt. Hood Cycling Classic
1st Mount Washington Hillclimb
1st Wilmington-Whiteface 100k MTB
National Amateur Road Championships

2nd Road race
3rd Time trial

4th Leadville Trail 100 MTB
2014
1st Overall SRS No. 3: Asheville Omnium

1st Stages 1 & 3

3rd Wilmington-Whiteface 100k MTB
8th Time trial, National Road Championships
