= Steve Pyle =

Steve Pyle (Steven Ross Pyle) is a former United States Junior and Senior National Team cyclist (1976–1990) who competed at the national and international level and rode to many victories. He was known for his endurance and time trialing ability. He was a member of the U.S. cycling team for the 1980 Olympics, but the United States boycotted the event. After retiring from cycling he began competing in multisport, racing duathlon and triathlon, and worked as a professional endurance sport coach for 20-years. Steve won U.S. National Championships in cycling, duathlon, and triathlon. Competing as age group athlete at numerous World Championships, he finished 'on the podium' several times for duathlon and triathlon. Steve is retired from endurance sport competition and coaching, now putting his energy into fine art photography, focusing on travel, landscape, and night sky images. His photography website is here: http://www.pylepix.com
