= 2023 Bolton Equities Black Spoke season =

Bolton Equities Black Spoke
- UCI code: BEB
- Status: UCI ProTeam
- Manager: Scott Guyton
- Main sponsor(s): Bolton Equities
- Bicycles: Pinarello
- Groupset: Shimano

Season victories
- Stage race overall: 1
- Stage race stages: 3
- National Championships: 3

The 2023 season for Bolton Equities Black Spoke started in New Zealand with the New Zealand Cycle Classic in January. This is the first season for the team as a UCI ProTeam having spent the last three years as a UCI Continental team.

== 2023 roster ==
As of 14 January 2023

Rider	Date of birth
Ethan Batt (NZL)	20 August 1998 (aged 24)
Matthew Bostock (GBR)	16 July 1997 (aged 25)
Josh Burnett (NZL)	26 October 2000 (aged 22)
Ryan Christensen (NZL)	12 September 1996 (aged 26)
Logan Currie (NZL)	24 June 2001 (aged 21)
Mitchel Fitzsimons (NZL)	9 January 2003 (aged 20)
James Fouché (NZL)	28 March 1998 (aged 24)
Aaron Gate (NZL)	26 November 1990 (aged 32)
Regan Gough (NZL)	6 October 1996 (aged 26)
George Jackson (NZL)	20 February 2000 (aged 22)

Rider	Date of birth
Ollie Jones (NZL)	23 April 1996 (aged 26)
Josh Kench (NZL)	6 May 2001 (aged 21)
Luke Mudgway (NZL)	12 June 1996 (aged 26)
Bailey O'Donnell (NZL)	25 September 2000 (aged 22)
James Oram (NZL)	17 June 1993 (aged 29)
Jacob Scott (GBR)	14 June 1995 (aged 27)
Thomas Sexton (NZL)	19 November 1998 (aged 24)
Mark Stewart (GBR)	25 August 1995 (aged 27)
Rory Townsend (IRL)	30 June 1995 (aged 27)
Paul Wright (NZL)	3 February 1998 (aged 24)

Riders who joined the team for the 2023 season

Rider	2022 team
Matthew Bostock	WiV SunGod
Josh Burnett	MitoQ–NZ Cycling Project
George Jackson	MitoQ–NZ Cycling Project
Ollie Jones	St George Continental Cycling Team
Jacob Scott	WiV SunGod
Rory Townsend	WiV SunGod
Paul Wright	MG.K vis Colors for Peace VPM

Riders who left the team during or after the 2022 season

Rider	2023 team
Dylan McCullough	
Michael Vink	UAE Team Emirates

== January ==
The team started at the New Zealand Cycle Classic with the aim to take victory again after Mark Stewart won last year. With Stewart not there the team had James Oram as their leader. Stage 1 was a flat race with a small punchy hill at the end. With 30 km to go there were four riders up the road when Oram jumped across to make it five. The five made it to the line together holding off the bunch by 17 seconds with Oram taking the sprint. Stage 2 was a flat stage which ended in a mass bunch sprint where Luke Mudgway finished third in the same time as the winner. oram was safely in the bunch and retained the overall lead. The Queen stage was Stage 3 which finished up Admiral Hill. Black Spoke controlled the breaks for most of the day making sure no one had an advantage for the climb. At the bottom of the climb Josh Burnett attacked taking Dutch rider Adne van Engelen (Roojai Online Insurance) with him. The two fought hard over the last few kilometres with Burnett attacking just before the line to take the stage. Burnett moved up to second overall now five seconds behind Oram who kept his yellow jersey going into Stage 4. Stage 4 was a 126 km stage which ended in a mass bunch sprint. Mudgway started sprinting with 300m to go and held off the others to win the stage. With Oram in yellow going into the final stage, Bolton Equities Black Spoke worked hard to not let any break get too large a gap on the 49.6 km stage. The race ended in another mass sprint where Mudgway was edged out by Lucas Carstensen (Roojai Online Insurance). With that second place Mudway won the Points classification and Oram won the overall title.

The second race for the team was the Gravel and Tar Classic. Black Spoke was one of three teams to field six riders out of the 63 who started, of those only 30 finished the race. With 80 km of the 137.4 km route to go there was a bunch of eight riders leading the race. Four riders from the team were in the bunch; Burnett, James Fouché, Mudgway and Paul Wright. On one of the Gravel climbs with 40 km to go Fouché and Ben Oliver (MitoQ–NZ Cycling Project) rode away from the other six. The pair held a decent gap until Fouché punctured and he had to wait for assistance. Oliver made it all the way to the finish line solo with Fouché finishing 3' 16" down in second place. Wright was the third man home finishing 3' 31" down on Oliver. Burnett and Mudgway finished fifth and sixth respectively with their other two team members finishing in the top 15.

It was then off to the New Zealand National Criterium Championships. The race was controlled by the team stopping nay major breaks from getting too much time. Fouché pulled the leadout over the final climb splitting the bunch, Wright then started the leadout before swinging off with 600m to go letting George Jackson lead Mudgway to the final 300m. Mudgway opened the sprint easily winning the national title ahead of Jackson and Kiaan Watts.

The final race in January for the team was the Cadel Evans Great Ocean Road Race, the team's first UCI World Tour event. The team was one of two UCI ProTeams invited to participate in the event. The circuit race had a tough hill in it with Mudgway being distanced on the penultimate lap. When a small group attacked off the front Fouché helped Arkéa–Samsic bring the peloton back together. Ultimately the race ended in a 33-man bunch sprint with Aaron Gate the first from the team to cross the line, coming in 12th in the same time as the winner. Fouché commented on the team's efforts after the race saying; "All the boys rode super well and I think we showed we belong at this level." This was backed up by three riders finishing within eight seconds of the winner and Gate just outside the top 10.

== February ==
With the 2023 edition of the Tour of Antalya cancelled due to the earthquakes that occurred three days previously. The first race of February became the New Zealand National Time Trial Championships. The team had four riders start in the elite men category and one in the Under-23. Aaron Gate won the Elite title beating George Bennett (UAE Team Emirates) by six seconds. Gate dropped his chain on the course and had to stop and fix it losing time to Bennett. In the under-23 time trial Logan Currie defended his title winning with the fastest time of the day even beating the time of Gate in the elite race. The New Zealand National Road Race Championships were held two days later on 12 February 2023. The Team had a strong presence with 12 members starting the race. The team managed to get five riders into the break of the day with two other riders bridging across with George Bennett and Alex Heaney. Over the top of a hill the two groups joined. Straight away Ethan Batt, Ryan Christensen, James Oram and Tom Sexton attacked taking Reuben Thompson (Groupama–FDJ) with them. Over the penultimate climb Sexton and Batt were dropped leaving a group of three out in front. Logan Currie comes from out of nowhere and jumps up to the front bunch then attacking straight past forcing Thompson to chase. Oram then counters with Christensen following and the two get a gap. The pair make it a genuine sprint for the finish with Oram winning by a bike throw. Christensen takes second with Currie out sprinting Thompson for third. This made Oram the Elite Road Race champion and Currie the Under-23 champion.

The first race outside of Oceania was the Tour du Rwanda.

== Season victories ==
Date	Race	Competition	Rider	Country	Location	Ref
11 January	New Zealand Cycle Classic, Stage 1	UCI Oceania Tour	James Oram (NZL)	New Zealand	Masterton	
13 January	New Zealand Cycle Classic, Stage 3	UCI Oceania Tour	Josh Burnett (NZL)	New Zealand	Masterton	
14 January	New Zealand Cycle Classic, Stage 4	UCI Oceania Tour	Luke Mudgway (NZL)	New Zealand	Wellington	
15 January	New Zealand Cycle Classic, Overall	UCI Oceania Tour	James Oram (NZL)	New Zealand		
15 January	New Zealand Cycle Classic, Points classification	UCI Oceania Tour	Luke Mudgway (NZL)	New Zealand		
15 January	New Zealand Cycle Classic, Team classification	UCI Oceania Tour	(Note: The riders on the squad were James Oram, Luke Mudgway, Josh Burnett, Logan Currie, Ethan Batt, Ollie Jones.)	New Zealand		
26 March	La Roue Tourangelle	UCI Europe Tour	Rory Townsend (IRL)	France	Tours	
30 April	Vuelta a Asturias, Mountains classification	UCI EuropeTour	Ollie Jones (NZL)	Spain		
1 May	Tour of Greece, Prologue	UCI Europe Tour	Aaron Gate (NZL)	Greece	Heraklion	
6 May	Tour of Greece, Young rider classification	UCI Europe Tour	Logan Currie (NZL)	Greece		
19 August	Danmark Rundt, Young rider classification	UCI ProSeries	Logan Currie (NZL)	Denmark		
25 August	Tour Poitou-Charentes en Nouvelle-Aquitaine, Mountains classification	UCI Europe Tour	James Fouché (NZL)	France		

== National, Continental and World champions 2023 ==
Date	Discipline	Jersey	Rider	Country	Location	Ref
23 January	New Zealand National Criterium Championships		Luke Mudgway (NZL)	New Zealand	Palmerston North	
10 February	New Zealand National Time Trial Championships		Aaron Gate (NZL)	New Zealand	Tokoroa	
10 February	New Zealand National Under-23 Time Trial Championships		Logan Currie (NZL)	New Zealand	Tokoroa	
12 February	New Zealand National Road Race Championships		James Oram (NZL)	New Zealand	Tokoroa	
12 February	New Zealand National Under-23 Road race Championships		Logan Currie (NZL)	New Zealand	Tokoroa	
