= 2023 UCI Oceania Tour =

- Nineteenth edition of the UCI Oceania Tour

Details
- Dates: 11–21 January
- Location: New Zealand
- Races: 2

The 2023 UCI Oceania Tour was the 19th season of the UCI Oceania Tour.

The UCI ratings from highest to lowest were are as follows:

- Multi-day events: 2.1 and 2.2
- One-day events: 1.1 and 1.2

== Events ==
Races in the 2023 UCI Oceania Tour
Race	Rating	Date	Winner	Team	Ref
New Zealand Cycle Classic	2.2	11–15 January	James Oram (NZL)	Bolton Equities Black Spoke	
(New Zealand) Gravel and Tar Classic	1.2	21 January	Ben Oliver (NZL)	MitoQ–NZ Cycling Project	
