= Dan Gardner (cyclist) =

British cyclist

Personal information
- Full name: Daniel Gardner
- Born: 6 March 1996 (age 30) Haywards Heath, England

Cycling career
- Sport: Cycling
- Discipline: Road
- Role: Rider

Amateur teams
- 2013–2014: Project 51
- 2018–2019: Baguet–MIBA Poorten–Indulek
- 2022: Mitre 10 MEGA Masterton
- 2023: Embark Spirit–BSS Rotor

Professional teams
- 2015–2016: Astellas
- 2017: An Post–Chain Reaction
- 2020: Tarteletto–Isorex
- 2023: Bolton Equities Black Spoke (stagiaire)

Daniel Gardner (born 6 March 1996) is a British professional racing cyclist. He rode in the men's team time trial at the 2015 UCI Road World Championships.

== Major results ==
2022
1st Stage 5 Tour of Southland
2023
1st Overall Tour of Southland

1st Stage 5

1st Sinksenkermis Oosterzele
7th Overall New Zealand Cycle Classic
9th Gravel and Tar Classic
1st Overall Tour of Southland
