= Hayden McCormick =

New Zealand cyclist (born 1994)

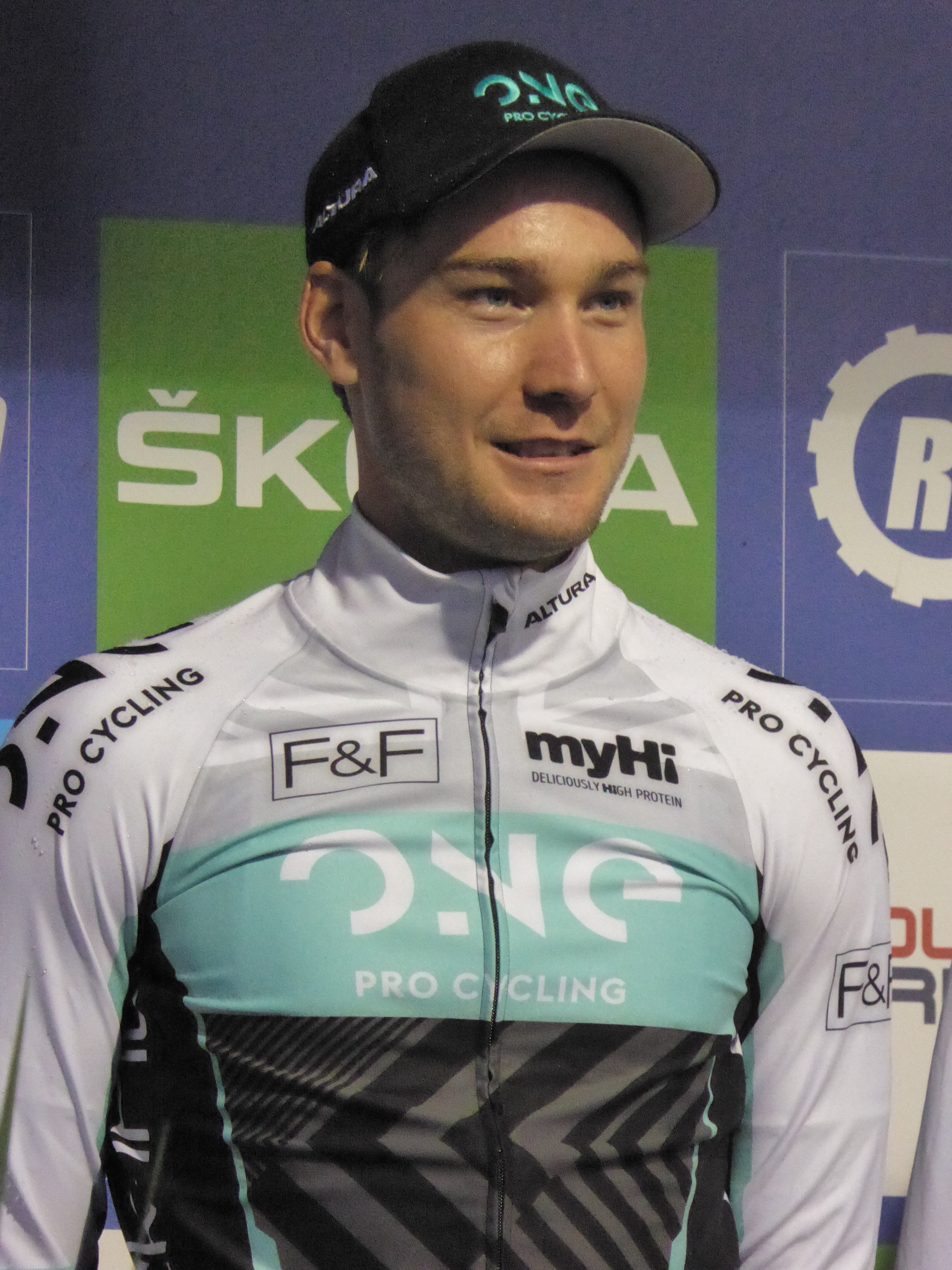
- McCormick at the 2016 Tour of Britain.

Personal information
- Born: 1 January 1994 (age 32) Cambridge, New Zealand

Cycling career
- Sport: Cycling
- Current team: Whoosh–NZ Cycling Project
- Discipline: Road
- Role: Rider

Amateur teams
- 2012: DCM–GB Vorselaar
- 2013–2015: Lotto–Belisol U23
- 2021: Kiwi Velo

Professional teams
- 2016–2018: ONE Pro Cycling
- 2019: Team BridgeLane
- 2020–2021: Black Spoke Pro Cycling Academy
- 2022–: MitoQ–NZ Cycling Project

Hayden McCormick (born 1 January 1994 in Cambridge, New Zealand) is a New Zealand cyclist, who currently rides for UCI Continental team Whoosh–NZ Cycling Project.

== Major results ==
2012
1st Criterium, National Road Championships
1st Overall Trophée Centre Morbihan

1st Points classification
1st Stage 1

1st Stage 1 Tour of Canterbury
2014
1st Road race, National Under-23 Road Championships
3rd Tour of Southland
9th Overall New Zealand Cycle Classic
2015
3rd Road race, National Under-23 Road Championships
9th Overall Tour de Berlin
10th Liège–Bastogne–Liège U23
2016
National Under-23 Road Championships

1st Time trial
2nd Road race

1st Stage 1 (TTT) Ronde van Midden-Nederland
8th Rutland–Melton CiCLE Classic
2017
2nd Rutland–Melton CiCLE Classic
5th Overall Ronde van Midden-Nederland

1st Stage 1 (TTT)

9th Velothon Wales
2018
1st Overall New Zealand Cycle Classic
2nd Road race, National Road Championships
3rd Gravel and Tar
5th Road race, Commonwealth Games
10th Overall Tour of Małopolska
2019
1st Mountains classification Tour of Utah
3rd Time trial, National Road Championships
4th Overall Tour of China I
5th Overall Tour of China II
2020
1st Gravel and Tar
4th Overall New Zealand Cycle Classic
2021
1st Tuatara 1000
7th Gravel and Tar Classic
