= James Williamson (New Zealand cyclist) =

New Zealand bicycle racer

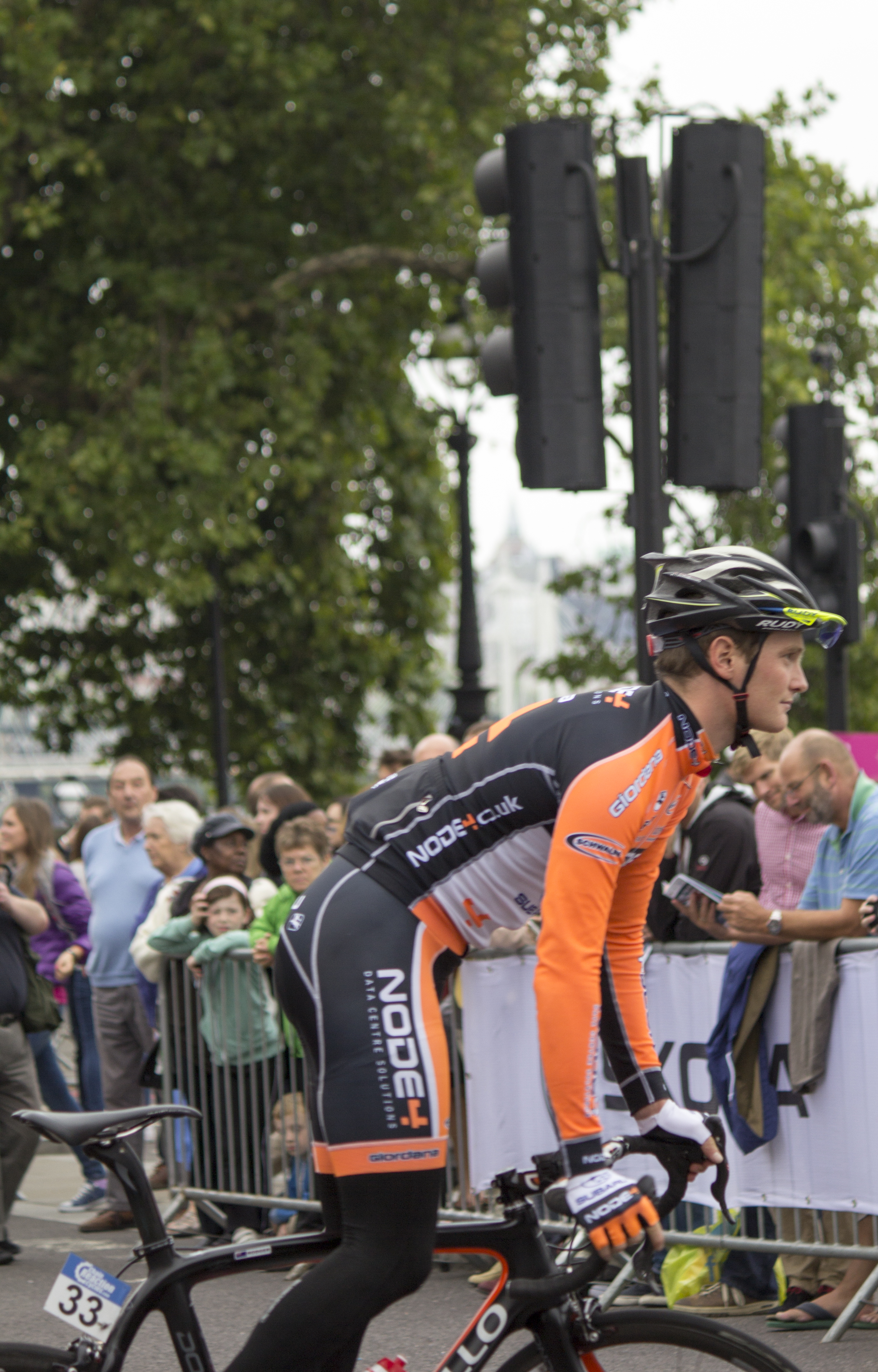
- James Williamson at the 2013 Tour of Britain

Personal information
- Full name: James Williamson
- Born: 27 March 1989 (age 37) Auckland, New Zealand

Cycling career
- Sport: Cycling
- Current team: Whoosh–NZ Cycling Project
- Discipline: Road
- Role: Rider

Amateur teams
- 2008–2010: Subway-Avanti
- 2012: PureBlack Racing
- 2014–2015: L&M Group Racing
- 2016–2021: New Zealand Cycling Project

Professional teams
- 2009–2010: Subway–Avanti Cycling Team
- 2011: PureBlack Racing
- 2013: Giordana Racing Team
- 2022–: MitoQ–NZ Cycling Project

James Williamson (born 27 March 1989) is a New Zealand professional road cyclist who currently rides for UCI Continental team Whoosh–NZ Cycling Project.

== Major results ==
Source;

2005
2nd Time trial, National Novice Road Championships
2006
2nd Road race, National Junior Road Championships
2008
3rd Le Race
2009
1st Road race, National Under-23 Road Championships
2010
1st Stage 3 Tour of the Murray River
2nd Road race, National Under-23 Road Championships
2011
2nd Road race, National Under-23 Road Championships
3rd Overall Tour of Wellington

1st Stage 1

6th Philadelphia International Cycling Classic
2012
2nd Road race, National Road Championships
10th Overall Tour de Filipinas
2014
5th Road race, National Road Championships
2020
8th Gravel and Tar
