= James Oram =

New Zealand bicycle racer (born 1993)

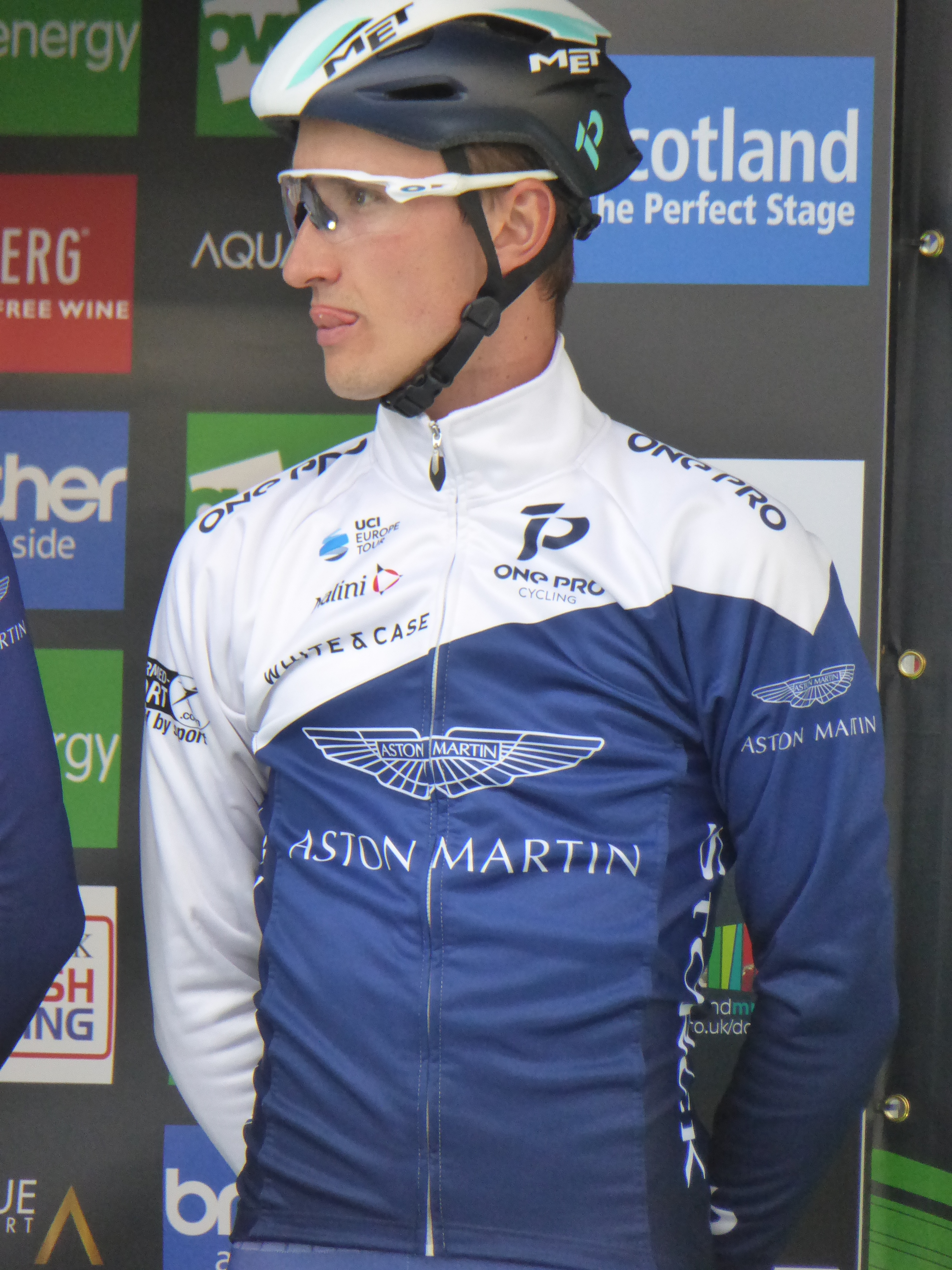
- Oram in 2018

Personal information
- Full name: James Oram
- Born: 17 June 1993 (age 33) Palmerston North, New Zealand
- Height: 1.83 m (6 ft 0 in)
- Weight: 68 kg (150 lb)

Cycling career
- Sport: Cycling
- Current team: Retired
- Discipline: Road
- Role: Rider

Amateur team
- 2011: PureBlack Racing

Professional teams
- 2012–2015: Bontrager–Livestrong
- 2016–2018: ONE Pro Cycling
- 2019: Mitchelton–BikeExchange
- 2020–2023: Black Spoke Pro Cycling Academy

Major wins
- One-day races and Classics National Road Race Championships (2023)
Medal record
Men's road cycling
Representing New Zealand
World Championships
Silver medal – second place	2011 Copenhagen	Junior time trial

James Oram (born 17 June 1993) is a New Zealand former cyclist, who competed as a professional from 2012 to 2023. His career took him from the American development team Bontrager–Livestrong, to British UCI continental team ONE Pro Cycling, before a year with Chinese Mitchelton–BikeExchange and finally riding for New Zealand Bolton Equities Black Spoke. He achieved one professional win in his career, the national road race championship in 2023.

== Career ==
=== Early years ===
Oram started cycling to school but didn't get into competitive cycling until high school where he met his first coach Scott Guyton. Oram rode for PureBlack Racing's development squad for the 2011 season. He won stage 1 of the Tour de l'Abitibi from a sprint of eight riders. His teammate Dion Smith took second and the pair held their positions over the seven-day race to take first and second overall. At the end of the year Oram rode the time trial at the UCI Junior Road World Championships. He set the best time of the early starters so was in the Hot-seat most of the day. Mads Würtz Schmidt beat Oram's time by 4 seconds to take the win with Oram moved to second.

=== Bontrager–Livestrong (2012 to 2015) ===
Oram's plan for the 2012 season was to originally ride for the professional PureBlack Racing team but they folded late 2011 leaving him without a contract. Instead he rode for Bontrager–Livestrong run by Axel Merckx. At the end of the 2013 season Oram rode the National event Tour of Southland. He won the Queen stage 2 up Bluff hill to take the lead, which he held onto over the following six stages.

=== ONE pro cycling (2016 to 2018) ===
Oram moved to his first 'Professional' team in 2016 with UCI Professional Continental team ONE Pro Cycling. His only win for the team came at the UCI rated 2.2 race Kreiz Breizh Elites where he attacked with just over 1.5 km to go and held off the chasing peloton to win. He placed third overall at the New Zealand Cycle Classic after leading for two days and won the Mountain classification.

=== Mitchelton–BikeExchange (2019) ===
After ONE Pro Cycling folded at the end of 2018 Oram was once again looking for a team. He approached Australian Mitchelton–Scott but they did not have space. While searching for a team Oram raced the New Zealand Cycle Classic for Team Skoda-Fruzio an amateur team, where he placed ninth. It wasn't until early March that he found a team the development team of UCI WorldTeam Mitchelton–Scott, Mitchelton–BikeExchange. The team focused on Chinese races which was an area of the world Oram was not familiar with.

=== Black Spoke (2020 to 2023) ===
In 2023 Oram won the overall of the New Zealand Cycle Classic a race where he had finished in the top 10 on 8 previous occasions and on the podium twice. Oram won the opening stage out-sprinting four other on the hill-top finish. He held the lead all the way to the end. The following month Oram took his only professional win of his career in the New Zealand National Road Race Championships sprinting team-mate Ryan Christensen on the line. While 2023 was the best year for Bolton Equities Black Spoke Murray Bolton pulled his funding and the team disbanded leaving Oram without a team for 2024. Because of this Oram decided to retire from professional cycling.

== Major results ==
2010
4th Overall Tour de l'Abitibi
2011
1st Overall Tour de l'Abitibi

1st Stage 1

1st Overall BDO Tour of Northland

1st Stage 1

2nd Time trial, UCI Junior Road World Championships
2012
10th Chrono Champenois
2013
National Road Championships

1st Under-23 road race
2nd Under-23 time trial
3rd Road race

1st Overall Tour of Southland

1st Stage 2

5th Chrono Champenois
2014
1st Stage 1 San Dimas Stage Race
National Under-23 Road Championships

2nd Time trial
3rd Road race

2nd Overall New Zealand Cycle Classic

1st Stage 5

10th Time trial, UCI Road World Under-23 Championships
10th Overall Tour of Alberta
2015
1st Time trial, National Under-23 Road Championships
2nd The REV Classic
3rd Overall Volta ao Alentejo

1st Young rider classification
1st Stage 1

4th Overall GP Liberty Seguros
6th Time trial, UCI Road World Under-23 Championships
7th Overall Tour de Beauce
8th Overall New Zealand Cycle Classic

1st Stage 3

2016
4th Overall New Zealand Cycle Classic
6th Beaumont Trophy
2017
3rd Overall New Zealand Cycle Classic

1st Mountains classification

4th Overall Ronde van Midden-Nederland

1st Stage 1 (TTT)

5th Overall Kreiz Breizh Elites

1st Stage 2

6th Velothon Wales
8th Overall Szlakiem Grodów Piastowskich
2018
5th Time trial, Commonwealth Games
5th Gravel and Tar
6th Overall New Zealand Cycle Classic
7th Overall Tour of Małopolska
9th Overall Kreiz Breizh Elites
2019
1st Mountains classification, Tour de Korea
4th Gravel and Tar
9th Overall New Zealand Cycle Classic
9th Overall Tour of Quanzhou Bay
10th Overall Tour of Taiyuan
2020
7th Overall New Zealand Cycle Classic
10th Overall Herald Sun Tour
2021
6th Overall New Zealand Cycle Classic
2022
6th Overall Tour de la Mirabelle
2023
1st Road race, National Road Championships
1st Overall New Zealand Cycle Classic

1st Stage 1

10th Overall Tour de Kyushu
