= 2011 UCI Road World Championships – Men's junior road race =

Men's junior road race
2011 UCI Road World Championships

Race details
- Dates: 24 September 2011
- Stages: 1
- Distance: 126 km (78.29 mi)

The Men's junior road race of the 2011 UCI Road World Championships was a cycling event that took place on 24 September 2011 in Copenhagen, Denmark.

== Final classification ==
	Cyclist	Nation		Time
1st place, gold medalist(s)	Pierre-Henri Lecuisinier	France	in	2 h 48 min 58 s
2nd place, silver medalist(s)	Martijn Degreve	Belgium	+	0 s
3rd place, bronze medalist(s)	Steven Lammertink	Netherlands		0 s
4	Florian Sénéchal	France		3 s
5	Rick Zabel	Germany		3 s
6	Roman Ivlev	Russia		3 s
7	Daniel Hoelgaard	Norway		3 s
8	Nicolas Marini	Italy		3 s
9	Stan Godrie	Netherlands		3 s
10	Frederik Plesner	Denmark		3 s
