= Ethan Batt =

New Zealand cyclist (born 1998)

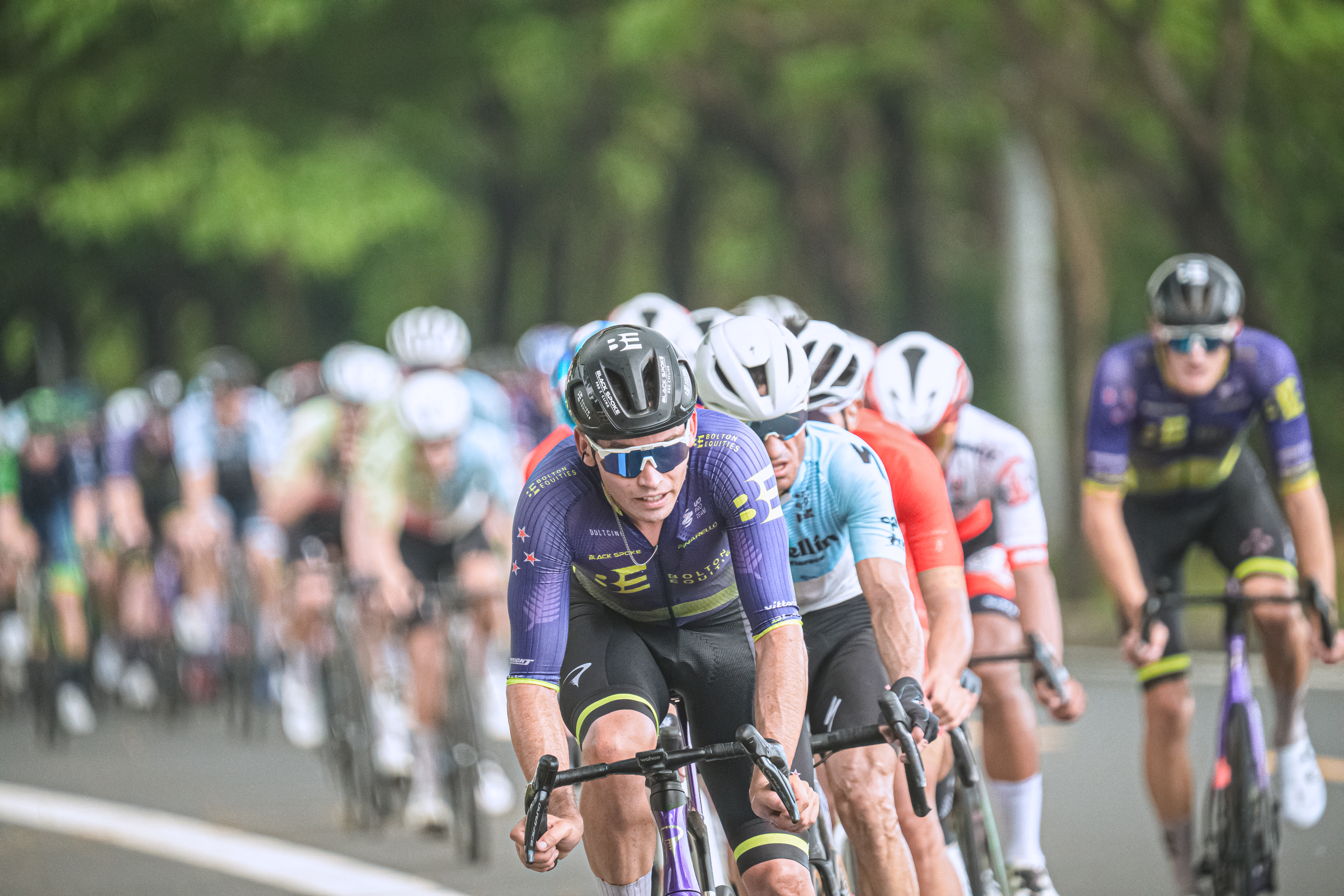
- Batt riding the front at the 2023 Tour of Hainan

Personal information
- Born: 20 August 1998 (age 28) Nelson, New Zealand
- Height: 1.88 m (6 ft 2 in)
- Weight: 76 kg (168 lb)

Cycling career
- Sport: Cycling
- Current team: FNIX–SCOM–Hengxiang Cycling Team
- Discipline: Road
- Role: Rider

Amateur teams
- 2017–2018: SoCalCycling.com
- 2019: Willebord Wil Vooruit
- 2025: Maxxis Le Fruit Dong Nai

Professional teams
- 2018: Mobius–BridgeLane
- 2020–2023: Black Spoke Pro Cycling Academy
- 2024–: Hengxiang Cycling Team

Ethan Batt (born 20 August 1998) is a New Zealand professional racing cyclist, who currently rides for UCI Continental team FNIX–SCOM–Hengxiang Cycling Team.

== Career ==
Ethan Batt started cycling in 2009.

In 2018 he rode for the SoCalCycling.com team taking wins in the Redlands Downtown Criterium and Victorville Stage Race. Later Batt rode for UCI Continental team Mobius–BridgeLane where he rode in the Australian national road series. In 2018 he finished seventh overall in the Tour of Southland also winning the mountain and young rider classifications.

In 2019 Batt won the opening race in the Calder Cycling Stewart Series.

== Major results ==
2016
1st Overall Junior Tour of Southland

1st Mountains classification
1st Stages 1 & 6

1st Overall Victorville Stage Race

1st Stages 1, 2 & 3

1st LA Circuit race
2018
2nd Michelob ULTRA Sequoia Cycling Classic
7th Overall Tour of Southland

1st Mountains classification
1st Young rider classification

2019
1st Stage 1 Calder Cycling Stewart Series
1st Stage 2 Tour de Vysočina
1st Prologue (TTT) Tour of Southland
2nd Criterium, National Road Championships
2020
2nd Time trial, National Under-23 Road Championships
2nd Stage 5 Tour of Southland
2023
7th Road race, National Road Championships
2025
1st Stage 10, Stage 13 HTV Cup
