= 2011 UCI Road World Championships – Men's junior time trial =

Men's junior time trial
2011 UCI Road World Championships

Race details
- Dates: 20 September 2011
- Stages: 1
- Distance: 27.8 km (17.27 mi)

The Men's junior time trial of the 2011 UCI Road World Championships was a cycling event that took place on 20 September 2011 in Copenhagen, Denmark.

== Final classification ==
	Cyclist	Nation		Time
1st place, gold medalist(s)	Mads Würtz Schmidt	Denmark	in	35 min 07 s 68
2nd place, silver medalist(s)	James Oram	New Zealand	+	4 s 11
3rd place, bronze medalist(s)	David Edwards	Australia		20 s 79
4	Markus Fäglum-Karlsson	Sweden		32 s 91
5	Yuriy Vasyliv	Germany		39 s 01
6	Casper von Folsach	Denmark		39 s 61
7	Kristopher Jorgenson	United States		46 s 65
8	Jonathan Dibben	Great Britain		48 s 04
9	Pierre-Henri Lecuisinier	France		49 s 08
10	Sondre Holst Enger	Norway		49 s 64
