= Logan Currie =

New Zealand cyclist (born 2001)

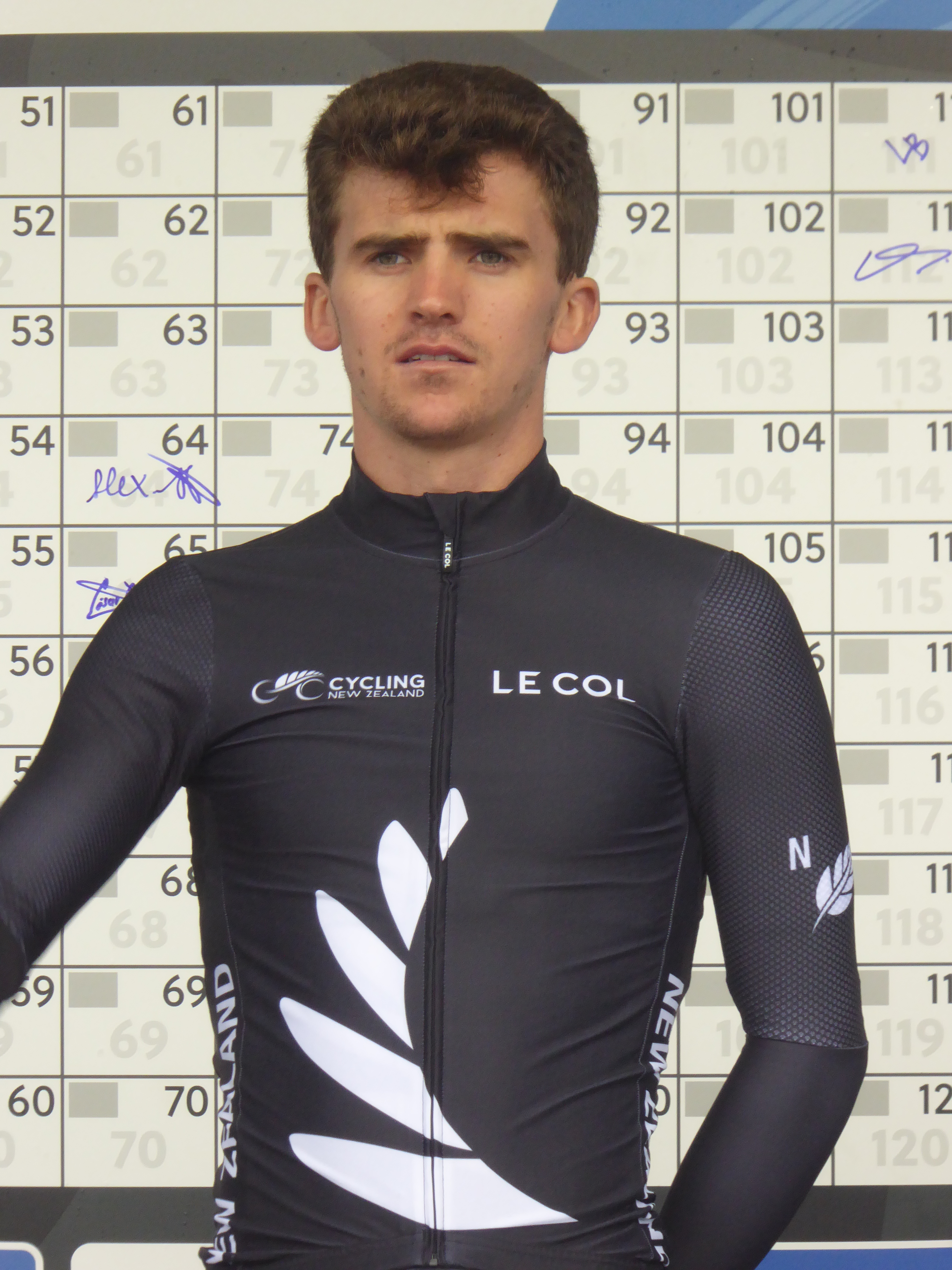
- Currie in 2023

Personal information
- Born: 24 June 2001 (age 25) Ashburton, New Zealand
- Height: 1.68 m (5 ft 6 in)

Cycling career
- Sport: Cycling
- Current team: Lotto–Intermarché
- Discipline: Road
- Role: Rider
- Rider type: Time trialist

Amateur teams
- 2019: Isorex Cycling Team
- 2020: Mysenlan–Baboco–Douterloigne CT
- 2020: Transport Engineering Southland
- 2021: Kiwi Velo

Professional teams
- 2021–2023: Black Spoke Pro Cycling
- 2024–: Lotto–Dstny

Major wins
- One-day races and Classics National Time Trial Championships (2024)

Logan Currie (born 24 June 2001) is a New Zealand road cyclist, who currently rides for UCI ProTeam Lotto–Intermarché.

== Major results ==
2019
1st Time trial, National Junior Road Championships
7th Johan Museeuw Classic
2020
3rd Time trial, National Under-23 Road Championships
8th Overall Tour of Southland
2021
2nd Time trial, National Under-23 Road Championships
3rd Overall Tour of Southland

1st Prologue (TTT)

3rd Stadprijs Geraardsbergen
2022
1st Time trial, Oceania Under-23 Road Championships
1st Time trial, National Under-23 Road Championships
1st Stage 1 (TTT) New Zealand Cycle Classic
4th Time trial, UCI Under-23 Road World Championships
4th Overall Tour de la Mirabelle

1st Young rider classification

9th Overall Course de Solidarność et des Champions Olympiques

1st Young rider classification

9th GP Raf Jonckheere Westrozebeke
2023
1st Time trial, National Under-23 Road Championships
3rd Road race, National Road Championships
7th Overall International Tour of Hellas

1st Young rider classification

7th Overall Ronde de l'Oise
8th Time trial, UCI Road World Under-23 Championships
2024
National Road Championships

1st Time trial
5th Road race

4th Overall New Zealand Cycle Classic
2025
National Road Championships

4th Time trial
4th Road race
