= James Fouché =

New Zealand cyclist (born 1998)

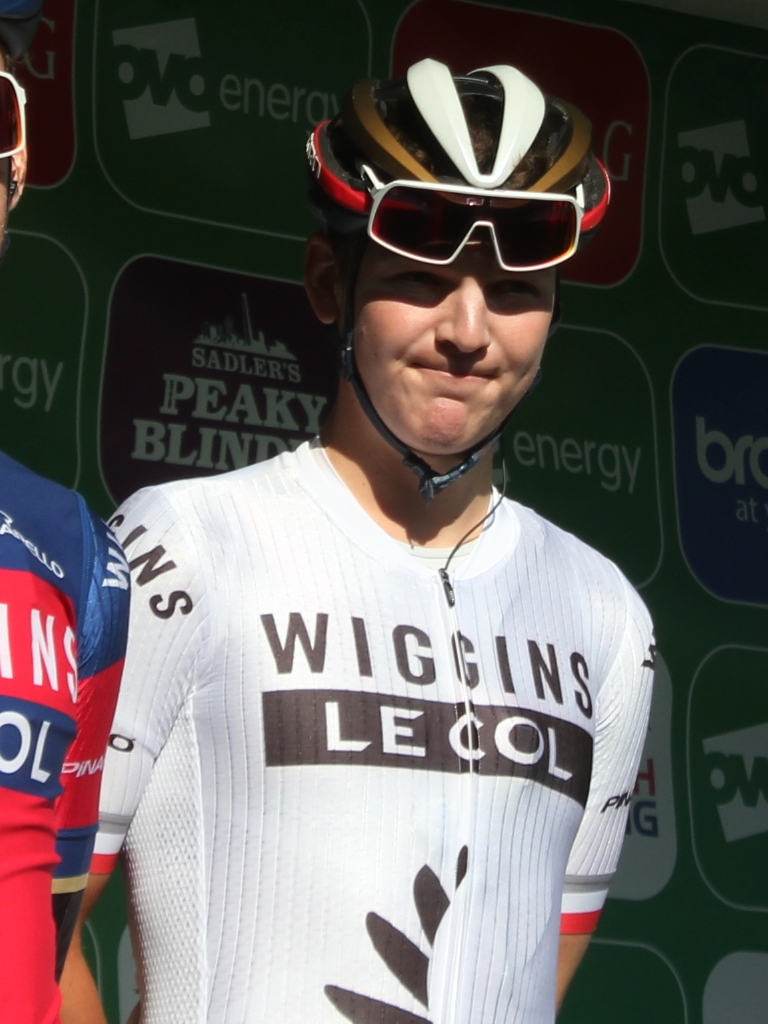
- Fouché at the 2019 Tour of Britain

Personal information
- Born: 28 March 1998 (age 28) Christchurch, New Zealand
- Height: 184 cm (6 ft 0 in)
- Weight: 69 kg (152 lb)

Cycling career
- Sport: Cycling
- Discipline: Road
- Role: Rider

Amateur team
- 2013–2016: SBS Ricoh NZ

Professional teams
- 2018–2019: WIGGINS
- 2019: Mitchelton–Scott (stagiaire)
- 2020: Hagens Berman Axeon
- 2021–2023: Black Spoke Pro Cycling
- 2024: Euskaltel–Euskadi
- 2025: MitoQ–NZ Cycling Project

Major wins
- One-day races and Classics National Road Race Championships (2019, 2022)

James Fouché (born 28 March 1998) is a New Zealand professional racing cyclist. In 2019 Fouche won the combined under-23 and elite New Zealand National Road Race Championships.

== Career ==
=== Amateur years ===
Fouché starting road cycling in his youth. He won the Under 19 New Zealand national time trial championships in 2016 after coming second in 2015.

=== WIGGINS/Team Wiggins Le Col 2018 to 2019 ===
At the New Zealand National Road Race Championships in 2019, Fouché attacked with 40 km to go. The bunch behind could not work well together so his lead grew. He managed to hold them off to win the combined Under-23 and Elite titles. Fouché crashed out of the winning move in the Ronde van Vlaanderen U23.

From August 2019 he rode as a Stagaire for Mitchelton–Scott, experiencing racing at a higher level.

=== Black Spoke 2021 to 2023 ===
2022 for Fouché started with the New Zealand national road championships. He didn't place in the Criterium but came fourth in the time trial. In the Road race Fouché attacked on the second lap going clear from the peloton, due to Cyclone Dovi the race length was shortened and the peloton was unable to catch Fouché resukling in him taking his second National Road race victory. In April he rode the Oceania Cycling Championships where he won the road race in the final sprint.

His Bolton Equities Black Spoke became a UCI ProTeam for the 2023 season allowing access to more races.

At the UCI ProSeries race the Tour of Britain Fouché was in the breakaway for four of the seven stages. In the process of doing so he gained the most points in the King of the Mountains classification to win the Black jersey overall.

=== Euskaltel–Euskadi 2024 ===
Fouché was the final rider added to Euskaltel–Euskadi's roster for the 2024 season after signing a one-year contract. At the time of his signing, he was only the second non-Spanish rider to sign for the team since the team restarted in 2018.

=== MitoQ-NZ 2025 ===
Fouché returned to New Zealand to sign for Continental team MitoQ–NZ Cycling Project for the 2025 season.

== Major results ==
2016
Oceania Junior Road Championships

1st Road race
2nd Time trial

2017
National Under-23 Road Championships

2nd Road race
2nd Time trial

2018
National Under-23 Road Championships

1st Road race
3rd Time trial

2nd Clássica da Arrábida
7th Overall Le Triptyque des Monts et Chateaux

1st Mountains classification

2019
1st Road race, National Road Championships
National Under-23 Road Championships

1st Road race
1st Time trial

1st Mountains classification, Tour of Antalya
1st Mountains classification, Le Triptyque des Monts et Chateaux
1st Mountains classification, Volta ao Alentejo
5th Overall Paris–Arras Tour
5th Clássica da Arrábida
6th Kattekoers
2021
1st Mountains classification, Tour d'Eure-et-Loir
1st Mountains classification, Tour de la Mirabelle
1st Mountains classification, Kreiz Breizh Elites
8th Overall Course Cycliste de Solidarnosc et des Champions Olympiques
9th Overall Oberösterreich Rundfahrt
2022
1st Road race, Oceania Road Championships
National Road Championships

1st Road race
4th Time trial

1st Overall Ronde de l'Oise

1st Stage 1

2023
1st Grand Prix Cerami
1st Mountains classification, Tour of Britain
1st Mountains classification, Tour Poitou-Charentes en Nouvelle-Aquitaine
2nd Gravel and Tar Classic
2024
9th Grand Prix Criquielion
