= Ben Oliver (cyclist) =

New Zealand cyclist (born 1996)

Personal information
- Born: 17 December 1996 (age 29) Christchurch, New Zealand
- Height: 1.83 m (6 ft 0 in)
- Weight: 71 kg (157 lb)

Cycling career
- Sport: Cycling
- Current team: Modern Adventure Pro Cycling
- Disciplines: Road; Mountain biking; Track
- Role: Rider

Amateur teams
- 2019: Team Skoda–Fruzio
- 2020: Central Benchmakers
- 2021: NZ Cycling Project p/b MitoQ
- 2024: Southern Cross Racing

Professional teams
- 2022–2023: MitoQ–NZ Cycling Project
- 2024: Denver Disruptors
- 2025: MitoQ–NZ Cycling Project
- 2026–: Modern Adventure Pro Cycling

Major wins
- Stage races Tour de Wallonie (2026)
Medal record
Representing New Zealand
Men's cycle racing
Commonwealth Games
Silver medal – second place	2022 Birmingham	Cross-country

Ben Oliver (born 17 December 1996) is a New Zealand racing cyclist, who currently rides for UCI ProTeam Modern Adventure Pro Cycling.

Oliver specializes in road racing and mountain biking. He also occasionally competes on the track, having ridden in the individual pursuit at the 2025 UCI Track Cycling World Championships.

His brother Craig is also a professional cyclist.

== Major results ==
=== Road ===
2019
7th Gravel and Tar Classic
2020
3rd Criterium, National Championships
2021
4th Overall New Zealand Cycle Classic
6th Gravel and Tar Classic
2022
2nd Criterium, National Championships
4th Overall Tour of Southland

1st Prologue (TTT)

2023
1st Overall Intelligentsia Cup

1st Stages 2, 4 & 5

1st Gravel and Tar Classic
1st Tighthead Mundelein Grand Prix
1st Lombard Cycling Classic
4th Criterium, National Championships
4th Overall Tour of Southland

1st Stage 7 (ITT)

4th Overall New Zealand Cycle Classic
2024
1st Melon City Criterium
2nd Snake Alley Criterium
2nd Kwik Star Criterium
5th Criterium, National Championships
6th Overall Tour of Southland

1st Prologue (TTT)

2025
1st Overall Tour of America's Dairyland

1st Stages 1, 3, 4 & 7

1st Tour of the Battenkill
1st Easton Twilight Criterium
1st Stage 5 Tour de Beauce
National Championships

2nd Road race
3rd Criterium

2nd Tour of Somerville
2026 (3 pro wins)
1st Overall Tour de Wallonie

1st Points classification
1st Stages 2 & 5

3rd Time trial, National Championships
7th Philadelphia Cycling Classic

=== Mountain bike ===
2013
3rd Cross-country, Oceanian Junior Championships
2014
Oceanian Championships

1st Junior cross-country
2nd Eliminator

1st Cross-country, National Junior Championships
2016
1st Cross-country, Oceanian Junior Championships
3rd Cross-country, National Championships
2017
2nd Cross-country, National Championships
2018
2nd Cross-country, National Championships
2019
2nd Cross-country, Oceanian Championships
2nd Cross-country, National Championships
2021
2nd Cross-country, National Championships
2022
National Championships

1st Marathon
2nd Cross-country

2nd Cross-country, Commonwealth Games
3rd Cross-country, Oceanian Championships
2023
National Championships

1st Short track
3rd Cross-country

2nd Cross-country, Oceanian Championships
2024
National Championships

2nd Short track
3rd Cross-country
