= Pune Grand Tour =

Indian multi-day road cycling race

Race details
- Date: January
- Region: Pune district, India
- Discipline: Road
- Competition: UCI Asia Tour 2.2
- Type: Stage race
- Organiser: Cycling Federation of India
- Web site: punegrandtour.in

History
- First edition: 2026
- First winner: Luke Mudgway (2026)

The Pune Grand Tour is an annual professional road bicycle stage race held across various locations in Pune district. It was rated by the International Cycling Union (UCI) as a 2.2 category race. The inaugural edition of the race took place from 19 to 23 January 2026.

== Background ==
The Pune Grand Tour was initiated by the administrators of Pune district, as a way to tie sporting legacy with the development of the district's infrastructure while attracting tourism and potential for more revenues in the district. The district administration, together with Cycling Federation of India (CFI), presented the race proposal to UCI in June 2025, who granted approval of the race with category 2.2. The race is the first UCI-sanctioned stage race in India.

=== Race route ===
The race spans a total 437 kilometres (272 mi) divided into four stages across various locations in Pune district including Pune, Pimpri-Chinchwad, Maval, Mulshi, Bhor, Baramati and Velhe. It is designed to cover various terrains through the Western Ghats, Deccan Plateau and the urban area.

=== Infrastructure ===
The Pune Municipal Corporation spent ₹123 crore (equivalent to ₹127 crore or US$13 million in 2026) for upgrading the infrastructure within its jurisdiction. This included resurfacing of the roads, manhole cover alignment, along with signage placement on a stretch of 75 kilometres (47 mi).

=== Other details ===
The logo and mascot named Indu (inspired by Indian giant squirrel, the state animal of Maharashtra) of the race was unveiled on 29 October 2025. Being a UCI sanctioned race, the 2026 edition provided ranking points for qualification to the 2028 Summer Olympics.

== Race overview ==
The inaugural race was divided into four stages with a prologue on the first day of the event. Starting from Goodluck Chowk on Fergusson College Road to Deccan Gymkhana bus station via Ganeshkhind Road, the prologue was a 7.5 kilometres (4.7 mi) time trial to decide the start list for the first stage. Fergus Browning (Terengganu Cycling Team) was the fastest overall and thus became the first holder of the yellow jersey. After winning the first stage, Luke Mudgway (Li-Ning Star Cycling Team) claimed the yellow jersey. In the second stage, Mudgway finished the race again at the first position and retained the yellow jersey. Stage three saw Cameron Scott (Li-Ning Star Cycling Team) as the winner, with Mudgway still at the top of the general classification.

== Winners ==
Year	Country	Rider	Team
2026	New Zealand	Luke Mudgway	Li-Ning Star
