= 2015 UCI Road World Championships – Men's under-23 time trial =

Men's under-23 time trial
2015 UCI Road World Championships
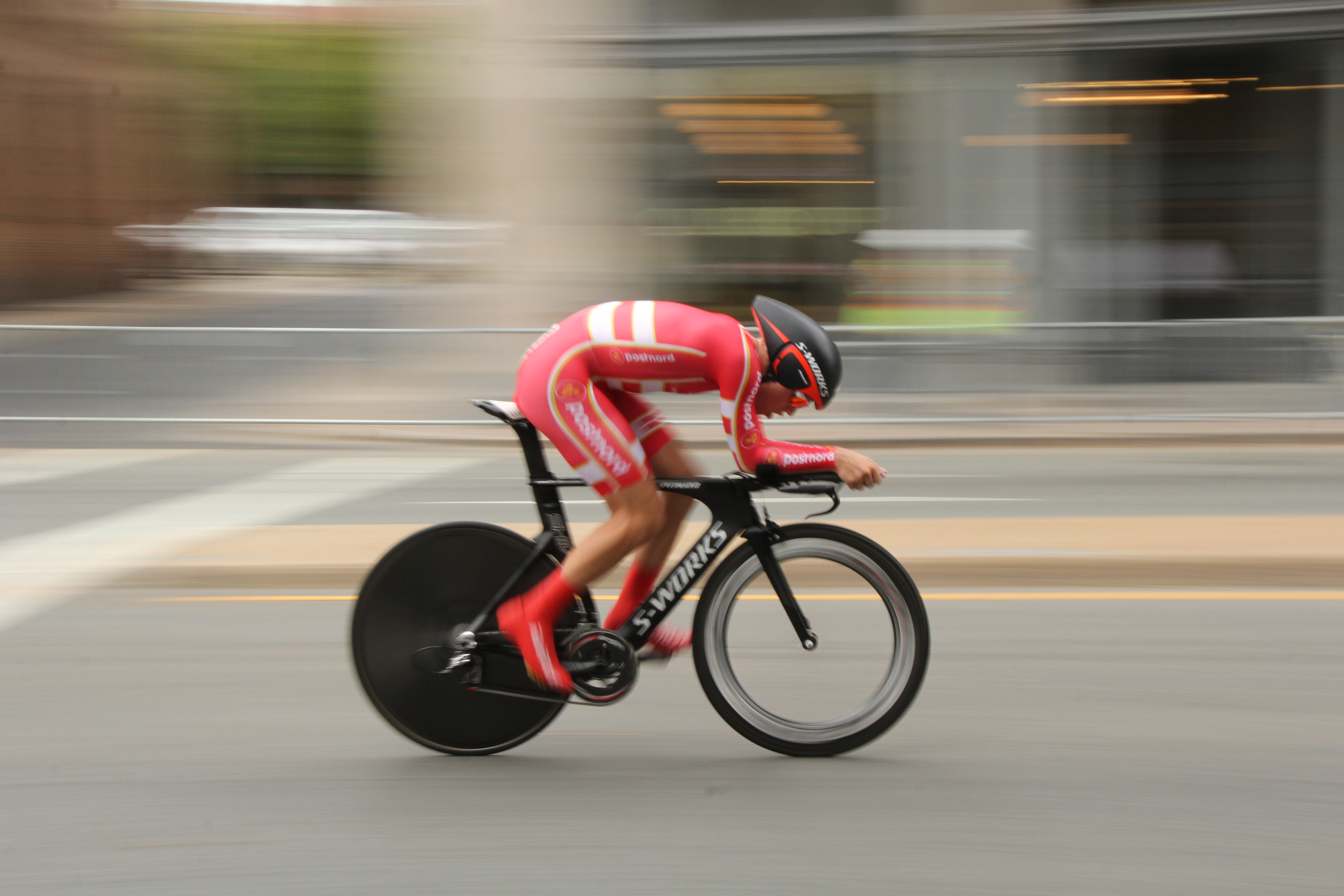
- Mads Würtz Schmidt won the time trial

Race details
- Dates: September 21, 2015
- Stages: 1
- Distance: 29.9 km (18.58 mi)
- Winning time: 37' 10.96"

Medalists
	Gold	Mads Würtz Schmidt (DEN)
	Silver	Maximilian Schachmann (GER)
	Bronze	Lennard Kämna (GER)

The Men's under-23 time trial of the 2015 UCI Road World Championships took place in and around Richmond, Virginia, United States on September 21, 2015. The course of the race was 29.9 km (18.6 mi) with the start and finish in Richmond.

The gold medal was by won former junior world champion Mads Würtz Schmidt of Denmark, beating German pair Maximilian Schachmann and Lennard Kämna – the reigning junior world champion – by 12.2 and 21.02 seconds respectively.

== Qualification ==
All National Federations were allowed to enter four riders for the race, with a maximum of two riders to start. In addition to this number, the outgoing World Champion and the current continental champions were also able to take part. The outgoing world champion Campbell Flakemore did not compete, as he was no longer eligible to contest under-23 races.

Champion	Name	Note
Pan American Champion	Ignacio Prado (MEX)	
Asian Champion	Sang-Hoon Park (KOR)	
European Champion	Steven Lammertink (NED)	
Oceanian Champion	Harry Carpenter (AUS)	

== Course ==
The individual time trial was contested on a circuit of 15 km (9.3 mi) and has a total elevation of 96 meters (315 feet). The under-23 men rode two laps of the circuit.

The circuit was a technical course that went through the city of Richmond. From the start, the route headed west from downtown to Monument Avenue, a paver-lined, historic boulevard that's been named one of the "10 Great Streets in America." From there, the course made a 180-degree turn at N. Davis Avenue and continued in the opposite direction. The race then cut through the Uptown district before coming back through Virginia Commonwealth University and then crossing the James River. After a technical turnaround, the race came back across the river and worked its way through downtown Richmond, eventually heading up to ascend 300 meters (980 feet) on Governor Street. At the top, the riders had to take a sharp left turn onto the false-flat finishing straight, 680 meters (2,230 feet) to the finish.

== Schedule ==
All times are in Eastern Daylight Time (UTC-4).

Date	Time	Event
September 21, 2015	11:30–15:50	Men's under-23 time trial

== Participating nations ==
50 cyclists from 34 nations took part in the men's under-23 time trial. The number of cyclists per nation is shown in parentheses.

- Algeria (2)
- Australia (1)
- Austria (1)
- Belgium (2)
- Canada (2)
- Chile (1)
- Colombia (2)
- Czech Republic (2)
- Denmark (2)
- Eritrea (1)
- Spain (1)
- France (1)
- Great Britain (2)
- Germany (2)
- Ireland (2)
- Italy (2)
- Japan (2)
- Kazakhstan (2)
- South Korea (1)
- Latvia (1)
- Luxembourg (1)
- Morocco (1)
- Mexico (1)
- Mongolia (1)
- Netherlands (1)
- Norway (1)
- New Zealand (1)
- South Africa (2)
- Russia (2)
- Rwanda (2)
- Switzerland (1)
- Sweden (1)
- Ukraine (1)
- United States (2)

== Final classification ==
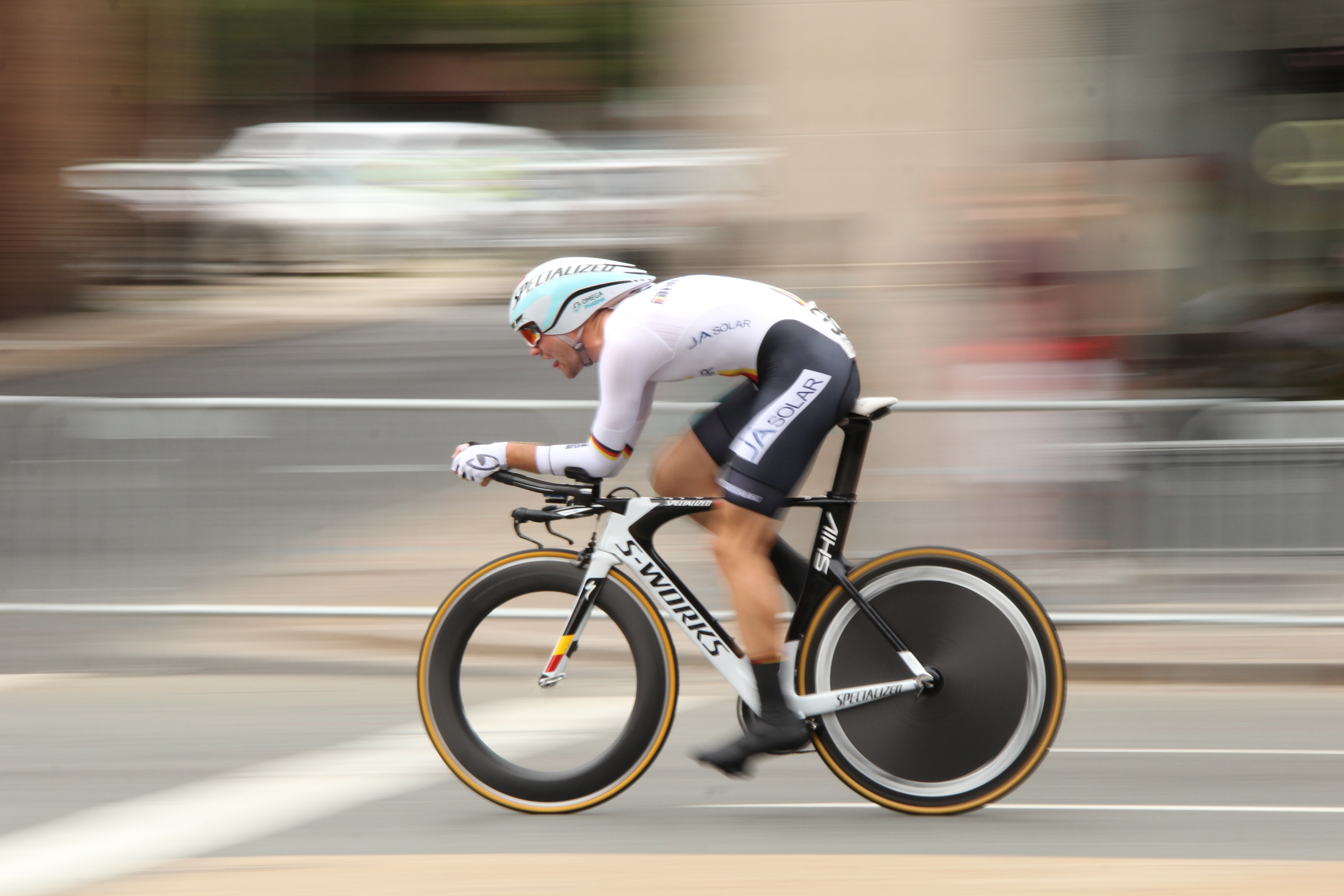
Maximilian Schachmann won the silver medal

Rank	Rider	Time
1	(Denmark) Mads Würtz Schmidt (DEN)	37' 10.96"
2	(Germany) Maximilian Schachmann (GER)	+ 12.20"
3	(Germany) Lennard Kämna (GER)	+ 21.02"
4	(Norway) Truls Engen Korsæth (NOR)	+ 36.10"
5	(United Kingdom) Owain Doull (GBR)	+ 36.25"
6	(New Zealand) James Oram (NZL)	+ 37.48"
7	(Australia) Miles Scotson (AUS)	+ 40.52"
8	(Switzerland) Théry Schir (SUI)	+ 41.13"
9	(Ukraine) Marlen Zmorka (UKR)	+ 42.68"
10	(United States) Daniel Eaton (USA)	+ 43.93"
11	(Republic of Ireland) Ryan Mullen (IRL)	+ 49.99"
12	(Italy) Davide Martinelli (ITA)	+ 58.03"
13	(Italy) Filippo Ganna (ITA)	+ 59.88"
14	(Netherlands) Steven Lammertink (NED)	+ 1' 03.92"
15	(Sweden) Marcus Fåglum (SWE)	+ 1' 11.40"
16	(Denmark) Søren Kragh Andersen (DNK)	+ 1' 18.53"
17	(Belgium) Nathan Van Hooydonck (BEL)	+ 1' 26.19"
18	(Chile) José Luis Rodríguez (CHI)	+ 1' 27.84"
19	(United States) Gregory Daniel (USA)	+ 1' 30.76"
20	(Canada) Sean Mackinnon (CAN)	+ 1' 36.10"
21	(Eritrea) Merhawi Kudus (ERI)	+ 1' 42.43"
22	(Kazakhstan) Stepan Astafyev (KAZ)	+ 1' 45.54"
23	(France) Marc Fournier (FRA)	+ 1' 45.87"
24	(Latvia) Krists Neilands (LAT)	+ 1' 46.42"
25	(Czech Republic) Josef Černý (CZE)	+ 1' 47.20"
26	(Luxembourg) Tom Wirtgen (LUX)	+ 1' 48.72"
27	(Mexico) Ignacio Prado (MEX)	+ 1' 50.92"
28	(Russia) Nikolay Cherkasov (RUS)	+ 1' 53.70"
29	(Austria) Gregor Mühlberger (AUT)	+ 1' 57.72"
30	(Belgium) Ruben Pols (BEL)	+ 1' 59.28"
31	(Czech Republic) Michal Schlegel (CZE)	+ 2' 06.86"
32	(South Africa) Nicholas Dlamini (RSA)	+ 2' 13.40"
33	(Canada) Alexander Cataford (CAN)	+ 2' 17.14"
34	(United Kingdom) Scott Davies (GBR)	+ 2' 19.69"
35	(Colombia) Jhonatan Ospina (COL)	+ 2' 28.42"
36	(Colombia) Jhonatan Restrepo (COL)	+ 2' 31.09"
37	(South Africa) Morne van Niekerk (RSA)	+ 2' 32.24"
38	(Republic of Ireland) Eddie Dunbar (IRL)	+ 2' 34.55"
39	(Russia) Roman Kustadinchev (RUS)	+ 2' 39.34"
40	(Kazakhstan) Oleg Zemlyakov (KAZ)	+ 2' 55.22"
41	(Algeria) Adil Barbari (ALG)	+ 2' 57.87"
42	(Morocco) Anass Ait El Abdia (MAR)	+ 3' 08.21"
43	(South Korea) Kyeong-Ho Min (KOR)	+ 3' 14.18"
44	(Mongolia) Altan Ochir Erdenebat (MGL)	+ 4' 18.35"
45	(Spain) Xavier San Sebastián (ESP)	+ 4' 24.69"
46	(Algeria) Abderrahmane Mansouri (ALG)	+ 4' 30.97"
47	(Rwanda) Bonaventure Uwizeyimana (RWA)	+ 4' 32.85"
48	(Rwanda) Valens Ndayisenga (RWA)	+ 4' 48.10"
49	(Japan) Atsushi Oka (JPN)	+ 5' 20.89"
50	(Japan) Yuma Koishi (JPN)	+ 5' 29.25"
	(North Macedonia) Andrej Petrovski (MKD)	DNS
	(Eritrea) Amanuel Ghebreigzabhier (ERI)	DNS
