= Brian Fowler (cyclist) =

New Zealand cyclist (born 1962)

Personal information
- Full name: Brian Andrew Fowler
- Born: 13 September 1962 (age 64) Christchurch, New Zealand

Cycling career
- Sport: Cycling

Major wins
- Stage races Tour of Southland (1985, 1986, 1987, 1988, 1989, 1990, 1992, 1995) Tour of Wellington (1989, 1990, 1991, 1992) One-day races and Classics National Road race Championships (1988, 1989) National Time trial Championships (1995)
Medal record
Men's cycling
Representing New Zealand
Commonwealth Games
Gold medal – first place	1990 Auckland	Team Time Trial
Silver medal – second place	1982 Brisbane	Team Pursuit
Silver medal – second place	1986 Edinburgh	Road Race
Silver medal – second place	1990 Auckland	Road Race
Silver medal – second place	1994 Victoria	Road Race
Bronze medal – third place	1994 Victoria	Team Time Trial

Brian Andrew Fowler (born 13 September 1962) is a retired cyclist who represented New Zealand at four consecutive Summer Olympics, starting in 1984. In 1983, he rode Paris–Nice finishing 43rd.

== Career ==
He won six medals (one gold, four silvers, one bronze) at four consecutive Commonwealth Games. Fowler's finest hour came when he won the gold medal in the men's team time trial at the 1990 Commonwealth Games.

Fowler won the Tour of Southland a record eight times. He also holds the record for number of wins in the Tour of Wellington, with four consecutive successes.

In February 2021, suffered a series of Myocardial infarctions requiring extensive hospitalization.

== Major results ==
1982
2nd 1982 Commonwealth Games Team Pursuit
1985
1st Overall Tour of Southland
1st Overall Dulux Tour of the North Island
1986
2nd 1986 Commonwealth Games Road race
1st Overall Tour of Southland
1st Manx International GP
1987
1st Overall Tour of Southland
2nd National Road Race Championships
1988
1st National Road Race Championships
1st Overall Tour of Southland
2nd Overall Tour de Beauce
1989
1st National Road Race Championships
1st Overall Tour of Southland
1st Overall Tour of Wellington
1990
1st 1990 Commonwealth Games Team Time Trial
2nd 1990 Commonwealth Games Road race
1st Overall Tour of Southland
1st Overall Tour of Wellington
1st Overall Examiner Tour of the North
1991
1st Overall Hessen Rundfahrt
1st Overall Tour of Wellington
1992
1st Overall Tour of Southland
1st Overall Tour of Wellington
1994
2nd 1994 Commonwealth Games Road race
3rd 1994 Commonwealth Games Team Time Trial
1st Overall Sachsen Tour
2nd National Road Race Championships
1995
1st National Time Trial Championships
1st Overall Tour of Southland
1996
2nd National Time Trial Championships
1997
2nd National Road Race Championships
2002
1st Stage 3 Tour of Southland
2004
3rd Main Divide Cycle Race
2005
1st Le Race
2nd Main Divide Cycle Race
