= Josh Burnett =

New Zealand cyclist (born 2000)

Personal information
- Born: 26 October 2000 (age 25) Invercargill, New Zealand
- Height: 1.87 m (6 ft 2 in)
- Weight: 73 kg (161 lb)

Cycling career
- Sport: Cycling
- Current team: Burgos Burpellet BH
- Disciplines: Road; Mountain bike; Cyclo-cross
- Role: Rider

Amateur team
- 2021: NZ Cycling Project

Professional teams
- 2022: MitoQ–NZ Cycling Project
- 2023: Bolton Equities Black Spoke
- 2024: MitoQ–NZ Cycling Project
- 2025–: Burgos Burpellet BH

Josh Burnett (born 26 October 2000) is a New Zealand cyclist, who currently rides for UCI ProTean Burgos Burpellet BH.

In 2024 he won the overall classification of the Tour de Beauce.

== Major results ==
=== Road ===
2021
1st Stage 4 Tour of Southland
5th Overall New Zealand Cycle Classic
2022
1st Overall Tour of Southland

1st Prologue (TTT) & Stage 7

1st Young rider classification, Joe Martin Stage Race
2023
2nd Overall New Zealand Cycle Classic

1st Stage 3

5th Gravel and Tar Classic
8th Overall Tour of Hainan
2024
1st Overall Tour de Beauce

1st Stage 3

1st Gravel and Tar Classic
7th Overall New Zealand Cycle Classic
7th Gran Premio New York City
2026
1st Mountains classification, Vuelta a Andalucía
7th Overall Tour de Langkawi

=== Cyclo-cross ===
2021–2022
1st National Championships

=== Mountain bike ===
2018
2nd Cross-country, National Junior Championships
2020
2nd Cross-country, Oceania Under-23 Championships
2nd Cross-country, National Championships
