= Tino Tabak =

New Zealand cyclist

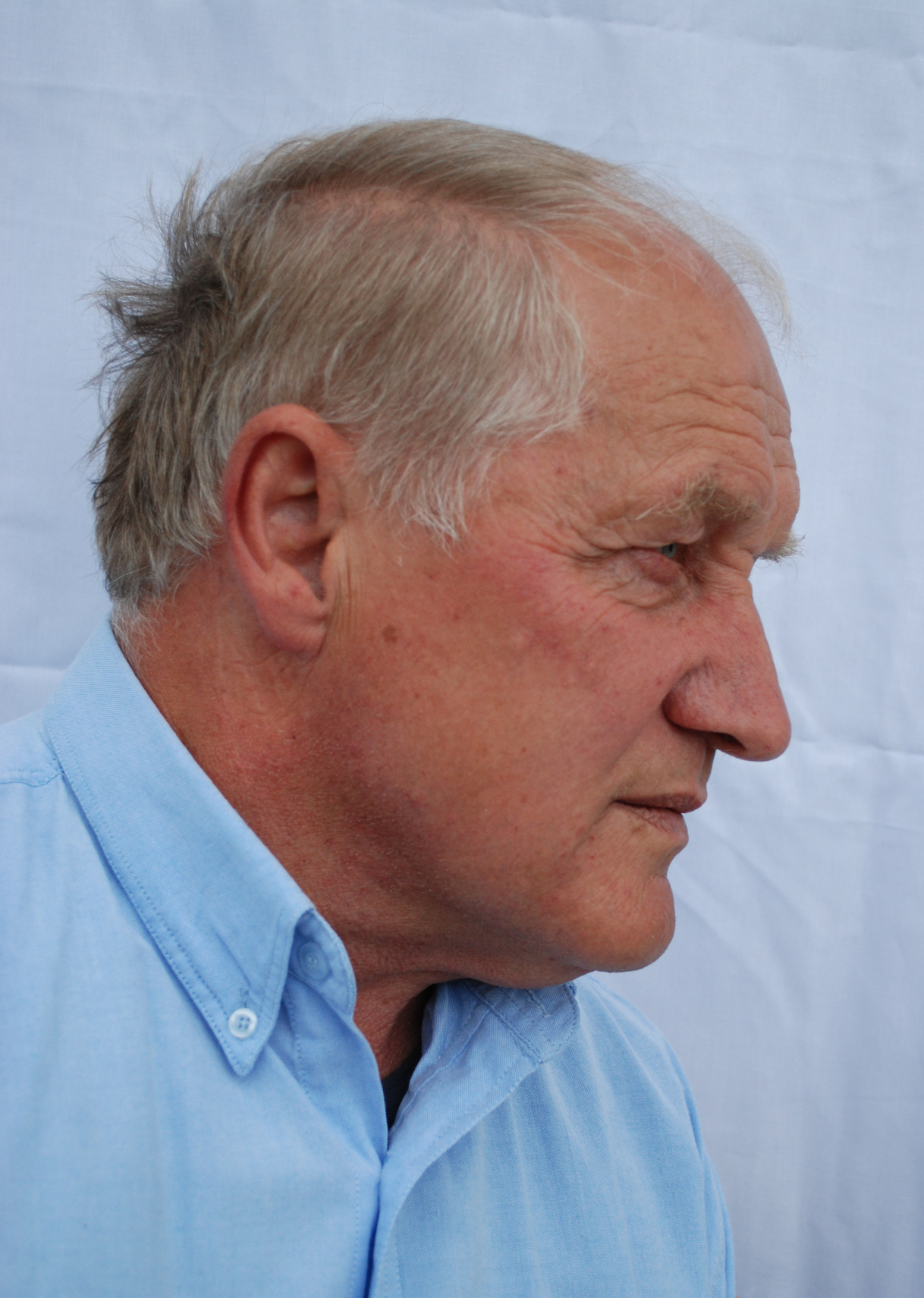
- Tino Tabak at home, 19 September 2008.

Personal information
- Full name: Jentinus (Tino) Johannes Tabak
- Nickname: De Bataaf (The blond)
- Born: 6 May 1946 (age 80) Egmond aan Zee, the Netherlands

Cycling career
- Sport: Cycling
- Current team: Retired
- Discipline: Road
- Role: Rider

Major wins
- Tour of Southland; Tour of North Holland; Acht van Chaam

Jentinus "Tino" Johannes Tabak is a Dutch-born New Zealand cyclist who raced in the Tour de France in the 1970s.

== Biography ==
Born Jentinus (Tino) Johannes Tabak in Egmond aan Zee in the Netherlands on 6 May 1946, he emigrated with his father Gerben and mother Hendrika to New Zealand in December 1952, aged 6. Tino's younger brother Corrie was born in New Zealand. From the age of 10 he aspired to race in the Tour de France.

At the age of 19, Tabak won the 1965 Senior New Zealand Road Cycling Championships. He won the Tour of Southland (youngest rider ever) in 1965, then again in 1966 and 1967. He also won the Tour of Manawatu in 1966 and 1967. And he won the Dulux Six-day Tour of the North Island in 1966 and 1967.

In the 1966 Commonwealth Games he competed in the Road Race, coming 15th.

Tabak is the only rider ever to win all three major New Zealand tours (Manawatu, Dulux and Southland) in one year – twice; in 1966 and 1967.

He left New Zealand for Europe "to learn how to ride a bike" in December 1967. In Europe he raced as an amateur from 1968 to 1970, winning several races, including the 1970 Tour of North Holland (beating future world champion Hennie Kuiper).

In 1971 he turned professional and rode in the Tour de France, placing in the top ten in two stages, and is reported as "The Revelation of the Tour" by Jock Wadley.

In 1972 Tabak won the Dutch National Road Race Championships. That year he came 18th in 1972 Tour de France, which is still the best result of any New Zealander (second best was George Bennett who came 24th in 2019, and third best was Harry Watson (cyclist) who came 28th in 1928).

He won the major Dutch criterium Acht van Chaam, in 1972 and 1975. In 1977 he came 7th in the 597 km French Classic Bordeaux–Paris.

Tino Tabak retired from cycling after crashing in the 1978 Tour of Holland. He returned in 1995 to live quietly in Canterbury, New Zealand.

== Teams ==
- 1969 – Dutch National Team
- 1970 – Dutch National Team
- 1971 – Flandria-Mars
- 1972 – Goudsmit-Hoff
- 1973 – Sonolor
- 1974 – TI-Raleigh
- 1975 – TI-Raleigh
- 1976 – Flandria-Velda
- 1977 – De Onderneming
- 1978 – Zoppas-Zeus
