= Luke Mudgway =

New Zealand cyclist (born 1996)

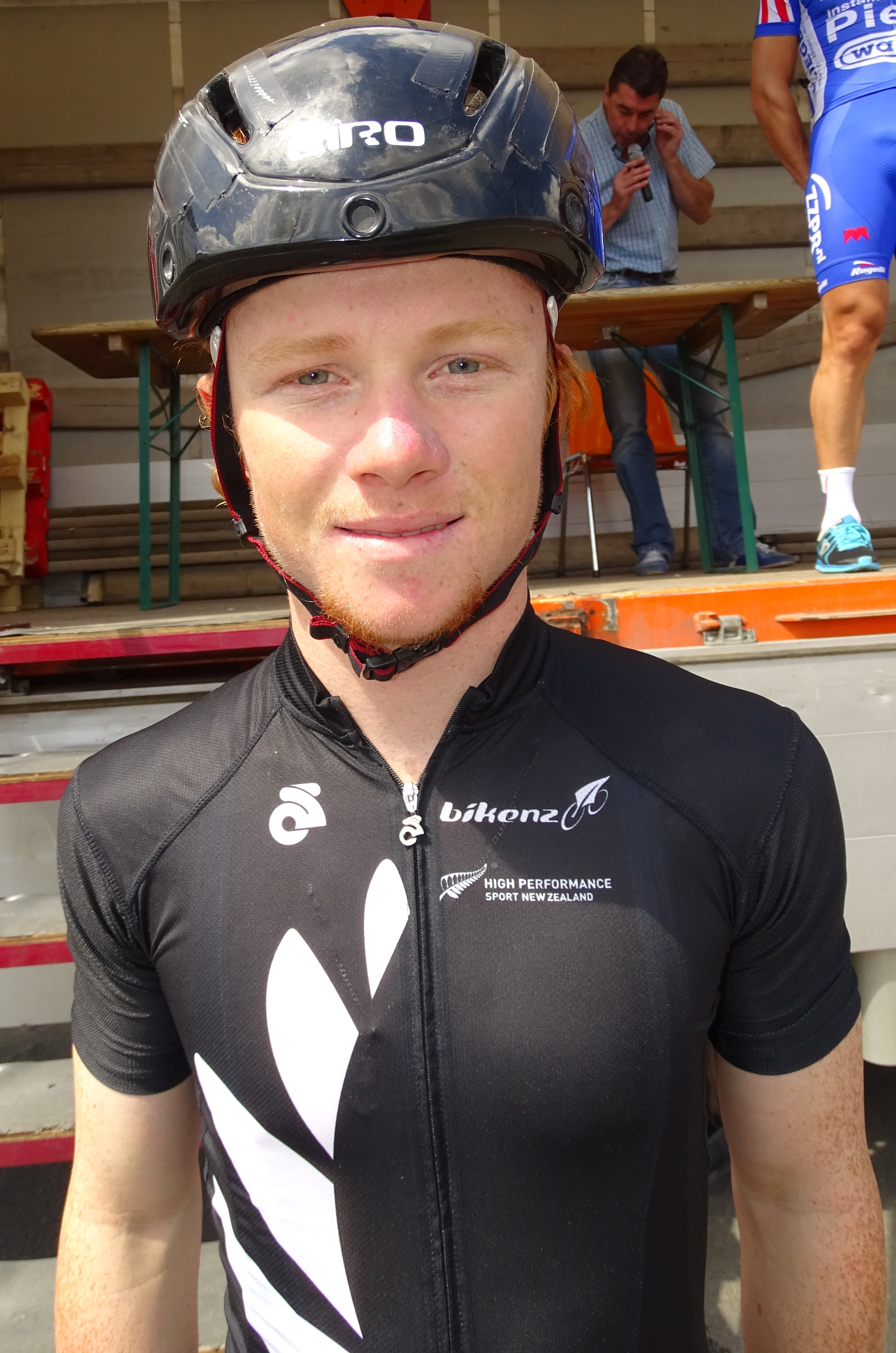
- Mudgway in 2015

Personal information
- Full name: Luke Mudgway
- Born: 12 June 1996 (age 30) Palmerston North, New Zealand
- Height: 1.71 m (5 ft 7 in)
- Weight: 65 kg (143 lb)

Cycling career
- Sport: Cycling
- Current team: Li-Ning Star
- Disciplines: Track; Road
- Role: Rider

Professional teams
- 2015–2016: Avanti Racing Team
- 2017: RTS–Monton Racing Team
- 2018: H&R Block Pro Cycling
- 2019: EvoPro Racing
- 2020–2023: Black Spoke Pro Cycling Academy
- 2024–: Li-Ning Star

Luke Mudgway (born 12 June 1996) is a New Zealand racing cyclist, who currently rides for UCI Continental team Li-Ning Star. He competed in the points race at the 2016 UCI Track Cycling World Championships.

== Major results ==
=== Road ===
2016
3rd Overall Tour of China II

1st Stage 3

2018
1st Overall Tour of America's Dairyland
9th Overall Joe Martin Stage Race
10th Overall Tour of China II
10th Gravel and Tar
2019
1st Gravel and Tar
2020
2nd Gravel and Tar
2021
2nd Gravel and Tar Classic
6th Overall A Travers les Hauts de France
8th Overall New Zealand Cycle Classic

1st Mountains classification
1st Stage 2

2022
1st Overall Grand Prix Cycliste de Gemenc

1st Points classification

3rd Districtenpijl Ekeren-Deurne
2023
New Zealand Cycle Classic

1st Points classification
1st Stage 4

2026
Pune Grand Tour

1st Stages 1 & 2

=== Track ===
2014
1st Madison, UCI World Junior Championships (with Regan Gough)
