= Pierre-Henri Lecuisinier =

French cyclist

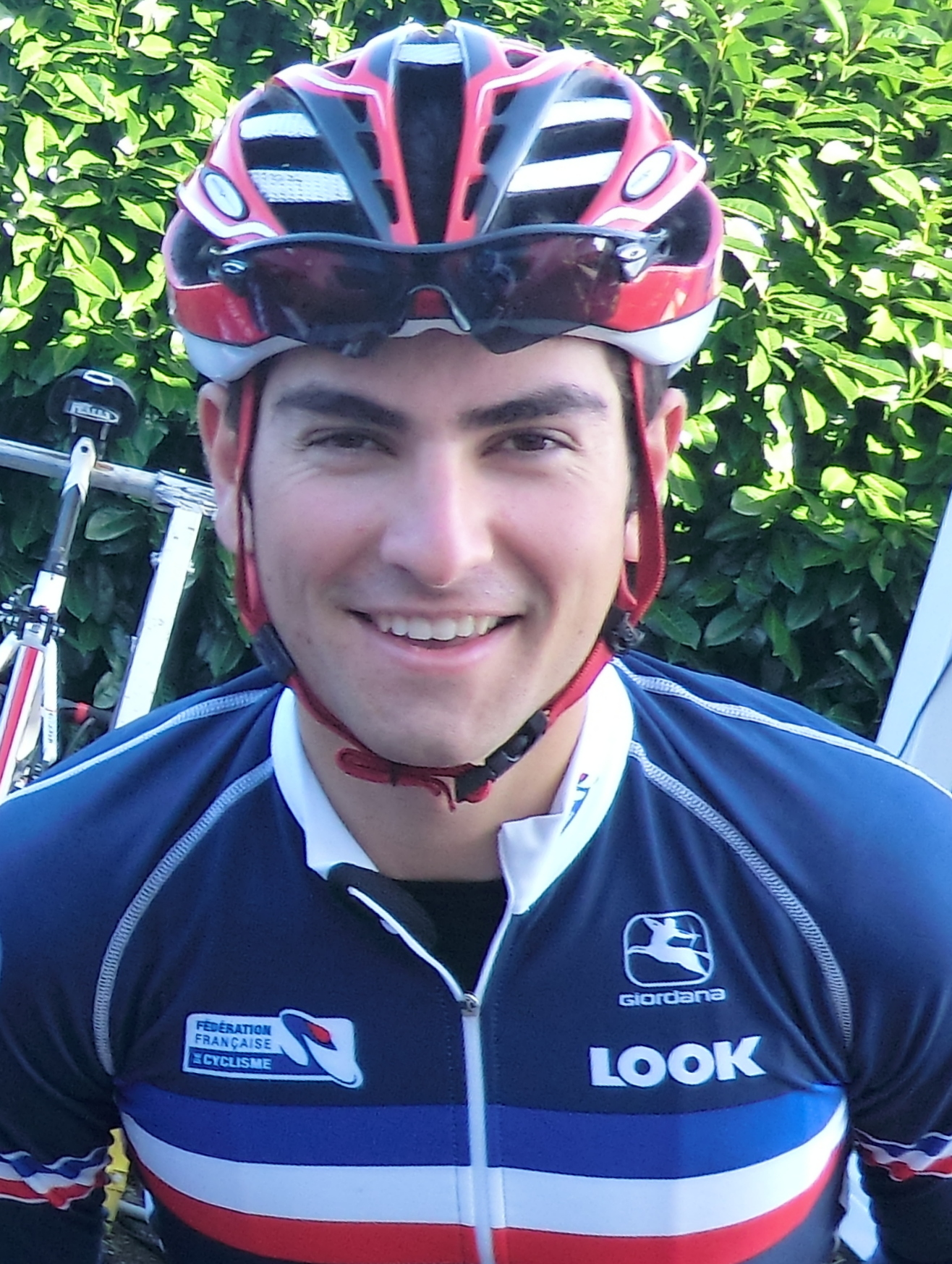
- Lecuisinier at the 2013 Tour de l'Ain

Personal information
- Born: 30 June 1993 (age 33) Flers, Orne
- Height: 1.76 m (5 ft 9 in)
- Weight: 65 kg (143 lb)

Cycling career
- Sport: Cycling
- Current team: Retired
- Discipline: Road
- Role: Rider

Amateur teams
- 2012–2013: Vendée U
- 2017: Pro Immo Nicolas Roux
- 2020–2021: UV Aube-Club Champagne Charlott'

Professional teams
- 2012: Team Europcar (stagiaire)
- 2013: Team Europcar (stagiaire)
- 2014–2016: FDJ.fr
Medal record
Men's road cycling
Representing France
Junior World Championships
Gold medal – first place	2011 Copenhagen	Junior Road race
European Championships
Gold medal – first place	2011 Offida	Junior road race

Pierre-Henri Lecuisinier (born 30 June 1993) is a French former professional road cyclist.

== Major results ==
2009
1st National Cyclo-cross championships
2010
1st Bernaudeau Junior
2011
UCI Junior Road World Championships

1st Road race
9th Time trial

UEC European Junior Road Championships

1st Road race
5th Time trial

1st Overall Trofeo Karlsberg

1st Stages 2 & 3 (ITT)

8th Overall Grand Prix Rüebliland

1st Stage 3 (ITT)

9th Paris–Roubaix Juniors
10th Overall Course de la Paix Juniors
10th GP Général Patton
2012
1st Overall Ronde de l'Isard

1st Points classification
1st Youth classification

9th Liège–Bastogne–Liège U23
2013
1st Overall Tour de la Dordogne

1st Stage 3

1st Overall Boucles de la Marne

1st Stage 3

1st Prologue Boucles de la Mayenne
7th Overall Paris–Arras Tour
9th Ronde Van Vlaanderen Beloften
