= Ryan Christensen =

New Zealand cyclist (born 1996)

Personal information
- Full name: Ryan Christensen
- Born: 12 September 1996 (age 30)
- Height: 1.75 m (5 ft 9 in)
- Weight: 63 kg (139 lb)

Cycling career
- Sport: Cycling
- Discipline: Road
- Role: Rider

Professional teams
- 2018: Oliver's Real Food Racing
- 2018–2021: Canyon Eisberg
- 2022–2023: Bolton Equities Black Spoke Pro Cycling

Ryan Christensen (born 12 September 1996) is a New Zealand professional racing cyclist, who last rode for UCI ProTeam Bolton Equities Black Spoke.

== Major results ==
2015
10th The REV Classic
2016
1st Points classification New Zealand Cycle Classic
2018
5th Overall Tour of Quanzhou Bay
2019
2nd Gravel and Tar
7th Slag om Norg
7th Schaal Sels
2021
3rd Road race, National Road Championships
3rd Gravel and Tar Classic
8th Overall New Zealand Cycle Classic
2022
1st Stage 1 (TTT) New Zealand Cycle Classic
4th Road race, National Road Championships
4th Overall Course de Solidarność et des Champions Olympiques
4th Gylne Gutuer
5th Overall Tour d'Eure-et-Loir

1st Fair play classification

2023
2nd Road race, National Road Championships
2024
3rd National Criterium Championships
10th Gravel and Tar Classic
