= Ollie Jones (cyclist) =

New Zealand cyclist (born 1996)

Personal information
- Full name: Ollie John Edward Jones
- Born: 23 April 1996 (age 30) Upper Hutt, New Zealand
- Height: 1.89 m (6 ft 2 in)
- Weight: 75 kg (165 lb)

Cycling career
- Sport: Cycling
- Current team: Southern Cross Racing
- Discipline: Road
- Role: Rider

Amateur teams
- 2017: Fagan Motors Team
- 2019: Team Skoda–Fruzio
- 2020: Canterbury
- 2024–: Southern Cross Racing

Professional teams
- 2018: Dimension Data for Qhubeka
- 2021: Global 6 Cycling
- 2022: St George Continental Cycling Team
- 2023: Bolton Equities Black Spoke

Ollie John Edward Jones (born 23 April 1996) is a New Zealand racing cyclist, who currently rides for club team Southern Cross Racing.

Jones received his Dimension Data for Qhubeka contract as the winner of the Zwift Academy Programme in 2018, in which over 9200 cyclists competed.

== Major results ==
2020
4th UCI Esports World Championships
5th Road race, National Road Championships
2021
9th Overall New Zealand Cycle Classic

1st Stage 1 (TTT)

2022
2nd Overall New Zealand Cycle Classic
2023
1st Mountains classification, Vuelta a Asturias
2024
3rd Overall New Zealand Cycle Classic
