= Team BridgeLane =

Australian cycling team

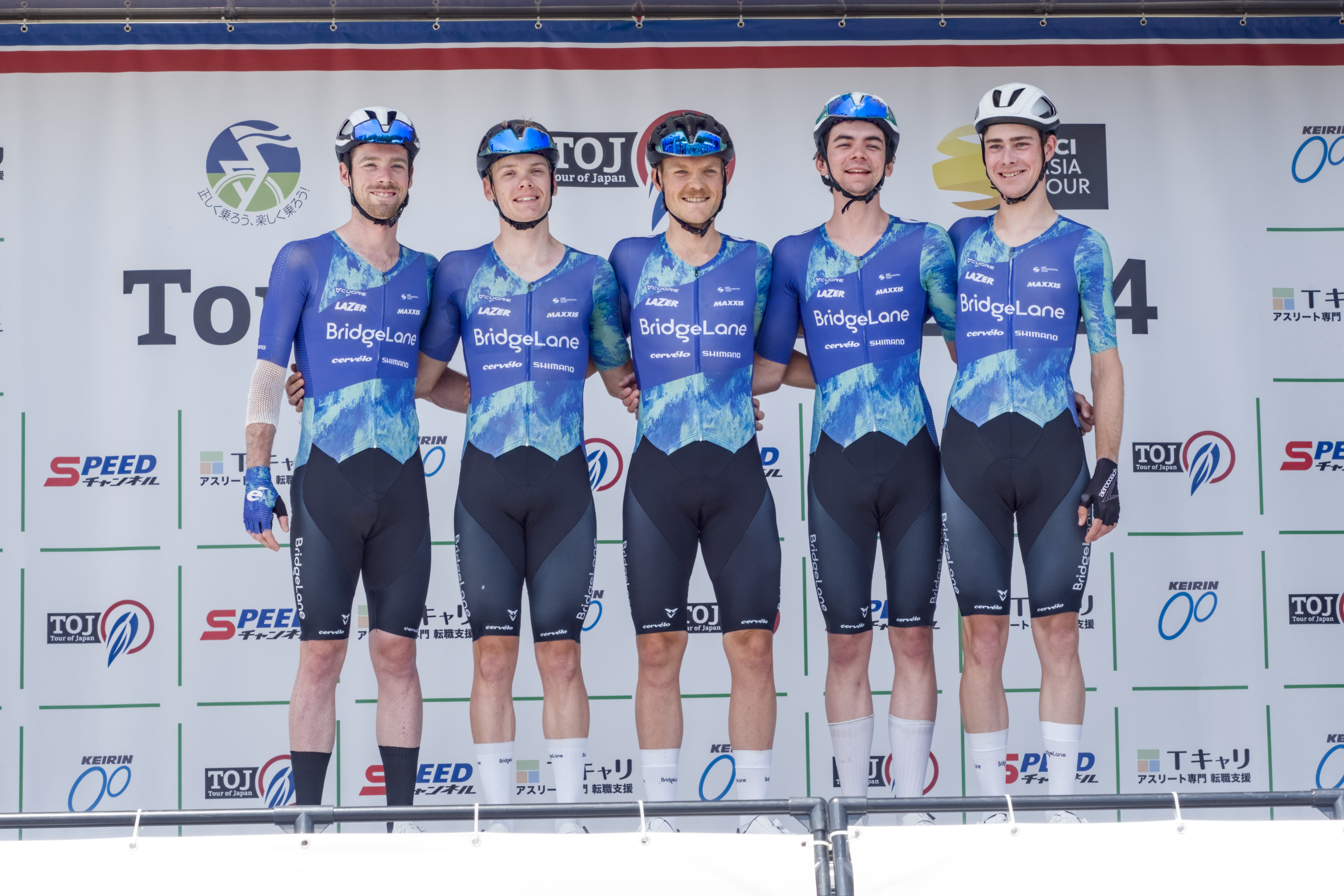
- Team BridgeLane in 2024

Team information
- UCI code: BLN
- Registered: Australia
- Founded: 2015
- Discipline: Road
- Status: National (2015–2017); UCI Continental (2018–)
- Bicycles: Cervelo
- Components: Shimano
- Website: Team home page

Key personnel
- General manager: Thomas Petty; Andrew Christie-Johnson
- Team managers: Andrew Christie-Johnson; Neil Walker

Team name history
- 2015–2017 2018 2019–: Mobius Future Racing; Mobius–BridgeLane; Team BridgeLane

Team BridgeLane (UCI team code: BLN) is an Australian UCI Continental road cycling team based in Sydney, Australia. Team BridgeLane competes in the Australian National Road Series (NRS) as well the UCI Oceania Tour.

== Team history ==
Established in January 2015 by Tom Petty as Mobius Future Racing, with major sponsorship from Mobius Marketing and Design Consultants principals Jane Tribe and Guy Bicknell, these days Team BridgeLane takes its name from the BridgeLane Group, an investment firm located in Sydney, Australia. The team finished 2nd overall in the 2016 National Road Series behind Avanti IsoWhey Sports and 3rd in 2017.

Outside of the NRS, the team has raced UCI events in the USA such as Tour of the Gila in 2017 and had riders represent Australia and New Zealand at World Championships on the track and the road. It has well established presence in various local racing scenes throughout Australia, as well as consistent success in State and National Open events. Several riders also compete in races in Europe and Asia throughout the year.

For the 2019 racing season, Bennelong SwissWellness Cycling Team and the Mobius BridgeLane teams merged to become "Team BridgeLane" and retained their UCI Continental licence.

== Team roster ==
As of 13 February 2024.

Rider	Date of birth
Luke Burns (AUS)	11 June 1998 (age 28)
Matthew Greenwood (AUS)	7 February 2003 (age 23)
Curtis Harrison (AUS)	28 November 2004 (age 21)
Sam Jenner (AUS)	2 April 1997 (age 29)
Zac Marriage (AUS)	12 November 2003 (age 22)
Bailey Mcdonald (AUS)	2 May 2003 (age 23)
Samuel Mckee (AUS)	8 January 2005 (age 21)
Jackson Medway (AUS)	15 October 2004 (age 21)

Rider	Date of birth
Ben Metcalfe (AUS)	27 May 2000 (age 26)
James Panizza (AUS)	25 November 2003 (age 22)
Tristan Saunders (AUS)	22 February 2000 (age 26)
Jack Schouten (AUS)	20 March 2002 (age 24)
Elliot Schultz (AUS)	5 August 2000 (age 26)
Dalton Stretton (AUS)	21 August 2003 (age 23)
Liam Walsh (AUS)	29 May 2001 (age 25)
Jack Ward (AUS)	2 May 2005 (age 21)

== Major results ==
2015
UCI Track World Championships (Team Pursuit), Alex Frame
UCI Track World Championships (Team Pursuit), Pieter Bulling
New South Wales Road Championships Hill Climb, Scott Bradburn
New South Wales U19 Road Championships Criterium, Liam Magennis
New South Wales U19 Road Championships Road Race, Liam Magennis
New South Wales U19 Road Championships Time Trial, Liam Magennis
Oceania U19 Continental Road Race Championships, Jackson Carman
Oceania U19 Track Championships (Team Pursuit), Jackson Carman
Oceania U19 Track Championships (Maddison), Jackson Carman

2016
New Zealand U19 National Time Trial Championships, James Fouché
New Zealand U19 National Road Race Championships, Robert Stannard
Stage 6 Tour of the Great South Coast, Nick Kergozou
Stage 7 Tour of the Great South Coast, Robert Stannard
Oceania U19 Continental Time Trial Championships, James Fouché
Oceania U19 Continental Road Race Championships, James Fouché
Overall Tour of Tasmania, Ben Dyball

Stage 4, Ben Dyball

Overall Satalyst Tour of Margaret River
New South Wales Road Championships Hill Climb, Scott Bradburn

2018
Gravel and Tar, Ethan Berends
Mountain classification New Zealand Cycle Classic, Dylan Newbery
Australia National Championships C5 Para-cycling Road Race, Alistair Donohoe
Australia National Championships C5 Para-cycling Time Trial, Alistair Donohoe
Australia National Championships C5 Para-cycling Road Race, Alistair Donohoe

2019
Melbourne to Warrnambool Classic, Nick White
Stage 3 Tour de Taiwan, Nick White
Overall Tour of Japan, Chris Harper

Stage 2, Ayden Toovey
Stage 6, Chris Harper

Overall Le Tour de Savoie Mont Blanc, Chris Harper

Stages 4 & 5, Chris Harper

2020
Overall New Zealand Cycle Classic, Rylee Field

Points classification, Jensen Plowright
Stage 3, Jensen Plowright
Stage 4, Rylee Field

Overall Tour de Taiwan, Nick White

Stage 3, Nick White

2021
Teams GC Santos Festival of Cycling
Australia u19 National Road Race Championships, Dylan George
Australia Track National Championships (Elite Team Pursuit), Pat Eddy, Jensen Plowright
