= Mads Würtz Schmidt =

Danish cyclist (born 1994)

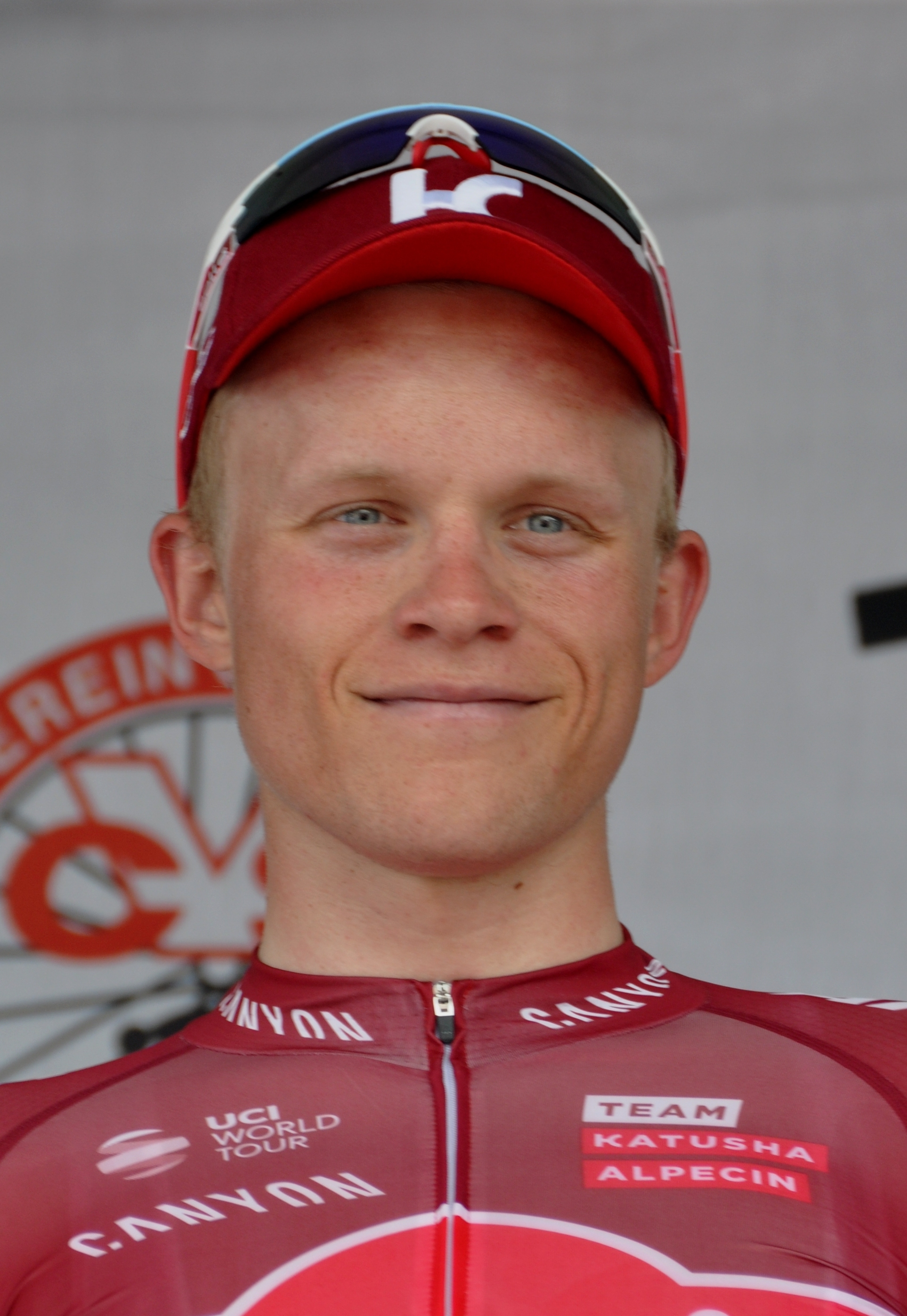
- Schmidt in 2017

Personal information
- Full name: Mads Würtz Schmidt
- Born: 31 March 1994 (age 32) Randers, Denmark
- Height: 1.76 m (5 ft 9 1/2 in)
- Weight: 72 kg (159 lb; 11 st 5 lb)

Cycling career
- Sport: Cycling
- Current team: PAS Racing
- Disciplines: Road; Gravel
- Role: Rider
- Rider type: All-rounder

Professional teams
- 2013–2014: Team Cult Energy
- 2015: Team ColoQuick
- 2016: Team TreFor
- 2017–2019: Team Katusha–Alpecin
- 2020–2024: Israel Start-Up Nation
- 2025–: PAS Racing

Major wins
- Gravel European Championships (2025, 2026) Road One-day races and Classics National Road Race Championships (2021)
Medal record
Men's road bicycle racing
Representing Denmark
World Championships
Gold medal – first place	2011 Copenhagen	Men's junior time trial
Gold medal – first place	2015 Richmond	Men's under-23 time trial

Mads Würtz Schmidt (born 31 March 1994) is a Danish racing cyclist, who rides for Specialized Off-Road Racing. He rode at the 2013 UCI Road World Championships. In May 2018, he was named in the startlist for the 2018 Giro d'Italia. In July 2019, he was named in the startlist for the 2019 Tour de France. In June 2021, he won the Danish National Road Race Championships.

== Major results ==
=== Gravel ===
2025
1st UEC European Championships
UCI World Series

1st Turnhout
1st Monaco
1st Houffalize
1st Blaavands

4th Unbound Gravel
2026
1st UEC European Championships
1st Overall Santa Vall

1st Stage 1

UCI World Series

1st Elvas–Badajoz
2nd Lucena del Cid

1st Unbound Gravel
1st The Traka
1st Grañén
1st Ranxo

=== Road ===
2011
1st Time trial, UCI World Junior Championships
1st Stage 2 Driedaagse van Axel
2nd Time trial, National Junior Championships
4th Overall Niedersachsen-Rundfahrt
2012
1st Overall Driedaagse van Axel

1st Stages 2 (ITT) & 4

1st Paris–Roubaix Juniors
1st Stage 2a (ITT) Course de la Paix Juniors
8th Time trial, UCI World Junior Championships
8th Time trial, UEC European Junior Championships
2013
1st Young rider classification, Le Triptyque des Monts et Châteaux
7th Ster van Zwolle
2014
2nd ZLM Tour
4th Rund um den Finanzplatz Eschborn-Frankfurt
5th Ster van Zwolle
2015
1st Time trial, UCI World Under-23 Championships
1st Time trial, National Under-23 Championships
1st Stage 4 Tour de l'Avenir
3rd Time trial, National Championships
6th Overall ZLM Tour

1st Stage 2 (TTT)

7th Overall Danmark Rundt

1st Young rider classification
1st Stage 5 (ITT)

8th Velothon Stockholm
9th Ringerike GP
2016
National Under-23 Championships

1st Road race
1st Time trial

1st Overall Le Triptyque des Monts et Châteaux

1st Points classification
1st Stages 2 & 3b

1st GP Herning
3rd Overall Danmark Rundt

1st Young rider classification
1st Stage 4 (ITT)

3rd Skive–Løbet
9th Overall ZLM Tour
9th Overall Boucles de la Mayenne
2017
2nd Rund um Köln
3rd Overall Étoile de Bessèges

1st Young rider classification

2018
7th Clásica de Almería
2019
3rd Overall ZLM Tour
2020
5th Coppa Sabatini
2021
1st Road race, National Championships
1st Stage 6 Tirreno–Adriatico
4th Trofeo Serra de Tramuntana
5th Overall Étoile de Bessèges
2024
2nd Fyen Rundt
3rd Boucles de l'Aulne

==== Grand Tour general classification results timeline ====
Grand Tour	2018	2019	2020	2021	2022	2023
Giro d'Italia	81	—	—	—	—	DNF
Tour de France	—	117	—	—	—	—
Vuelta a España	—	—	—	DNF	—	—

Legend
—	Did not compete
DNF	Did not finish
IP	In progress
