= Scott Guyton =

New Zealand cyclist (born 1976)

Personal information
- Full name: Scott Guyton
- Born: 11 June 1976 (age 50)

Cycling career
- Sport: Cycling
- Current team: Bolton Equities Black Spoke
- Discipline: Road
- Role: Rider (retired); Directeur sportif

Professional teams
- 1997–1998: Ipso - Euroclean
- 1999: Linda McCartney On Tour
- 2000–2003: Flanders - Prefetex
- 2004–2005: Wismilak Cycling Team

Managerial team
- 2020–: Black Spoke Pro Cycling Academy

Scott Guyton (born 11 June 1976) is a New Zealand former professional cyclist, who currently works as the directeur sportif and general manager of UCI Continental team Bolton Equities Black Spoke. Guyton competed at the 1996 Summer Olympics in Atlanta, in the men's individual road race, and at the 2000 Summer Olympics in Sydney, in the men's individual road race.

== Major results ==
1998
1st Overall Tour of Southland
1st GP du Printemps
9th Overall Herald Sun Tour
2000
3rd Ronde van Midden Brabant
2001
1st Auckland 1000/TelstraClear Challenge
2nd Time trial, National Road Championships
8th Overall Tour of Japan
10th Brussel-Ingooigem
10th Kampioenschap van Vlaanderen
2002
1st Stage 10 Tour of Southland
2003
1st Overall Tour of Southland

1st Stage 8

3rd Overall Herald Sun Tour

1st Stage 13

2004
1st Stage 1 (TTT) Tour of Southland
1st K2 Classic
