= 2011 UCI Road World Championships =

Cycling world championships

- Venue: Copenhagen, Denmark
- Date: 19–25 September 2011
- Coordinates: 55°40′N 12°34′E
- Nations participating: 72
- Cyclists participating: 1,237
- Events: 10

The 2011 UCI Road World Championships took place in Copenhagen, Denmark, over 19–25 September 2011. The event consisted of a cycling road race and a time trial for men, women, men under 23, and for the first time since 2004 the junior men and junior women competed at the same event as the elite riders. It was the 78th running of the Road World Championships. Castelfidardo near Loreto in Italy was also a candidate, but Italy held the UCI Road World Championships in Varese in 2008. It was the first time that Denmark has hosted the event since 1956, when it was also held in Copenhagen.

== Schedule ==
19 September

- 10h00-11h45 Time trial Junior Women, 13,9 km
- 13h00-17h30 Time trial Under 23 Men, 35,2 km (2x17,6 km)

20 September

- 09h30-13h15 Time trial Junior Men, 27,8 km (2x13,9 km)
- 14h00-17h10 Time trial Elite Women, 27,8 km (2x13,9 km)

21 September

- 12h30-17h05 Time trial Elite Men, 46,4 km (2x23,2 km)

23 September

- 09h30-11h55 Road race Junior Women, 70 km (5 x 14 km)
- 13h00-17h15 Road race Under 23 Men, 168 km (12 x 14 km)

24 September

- 09h00-12h30 Road race Junior Men, 126 km (9 x 14 km)
- 13h30-17h15 Road race Elite Women, 140 km (10 x 14 km)

25 September

- 10h00-17h05 Road race Elite Men, 266 km (17 x 14 km + 28 km, from start in Copenhagen town center)

== Courses ==
- Time Trial Course
- Road Race Course

== Participating nations ==
Cyclists from 71 national federations participated. The number of cyclists per nation that competed is shown in parentheses.

Participating national federations
Click on a nation to go to the nations' UCI Road World Championships page
- Albania
- Algeria
- Andorra
- Argentina
- Australia
- Austria
- Azerbaijan
- Belarus
- Belgium
- Brazil
- Canada
- Chile
- Chinese Taipei
- Colombia
- Croatia
- Czech Republic
- Denmark (host)
- Eritrea
- Estonia
- Ethiopia (1)
- Finland
- France
- Germany
- Great Britain
- Greece
- Guyana
- Hong Kong
- Hungary
- Iran
- Ireland
- Israel
- Italy
- Japan
- Kazakhstan
- Kyrgyzstan
- Latvia
- Lithuania
- Luxembourg
- Macedonia (1)
- Malaysia
- Mauritius (1)
- Mexico
- Moldova (1)
- Mongolia (1)
- Morocco
- Netherlands (38)
- New Zealand
- Norway
- Poland
- Portugal
- Romania
- Russia
- Saint Kitts and Nevis
- Serbia
- Singapore
- Slovakia
- Slovenia
- South Africa
- South Korea
- Spain
- Sweden
- Switzerland
- Syria
- Thailand
- Tunisia
- Turkey
- Ukraine
- United States
- Uzbekistan (2)
- Venezuela
- Vietnam

== Events summary ==
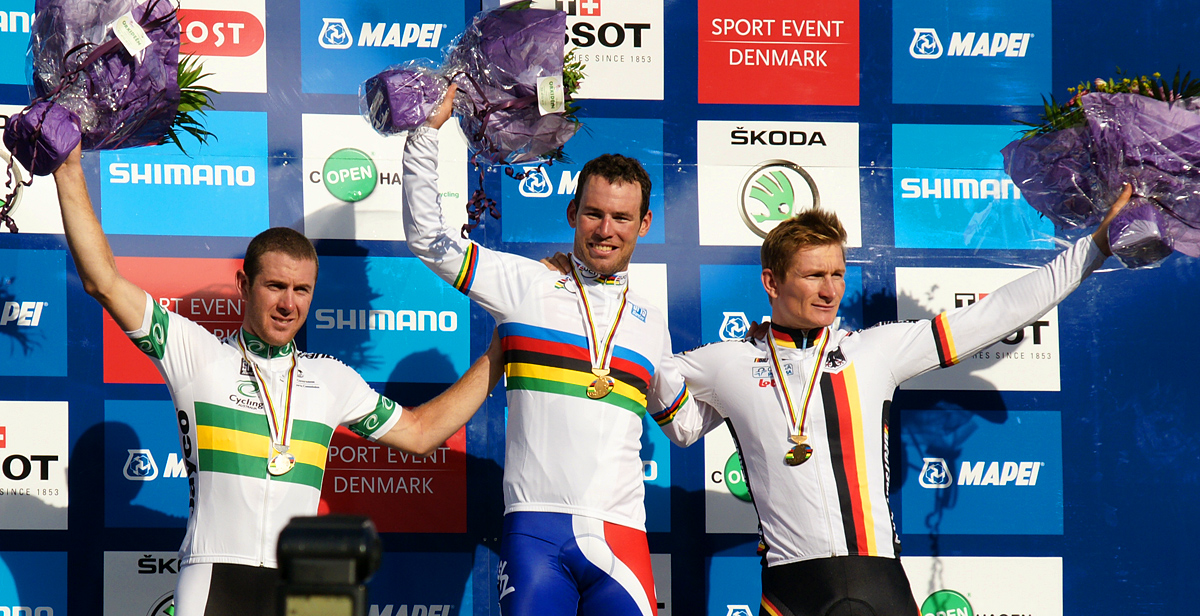
Podium men's road race

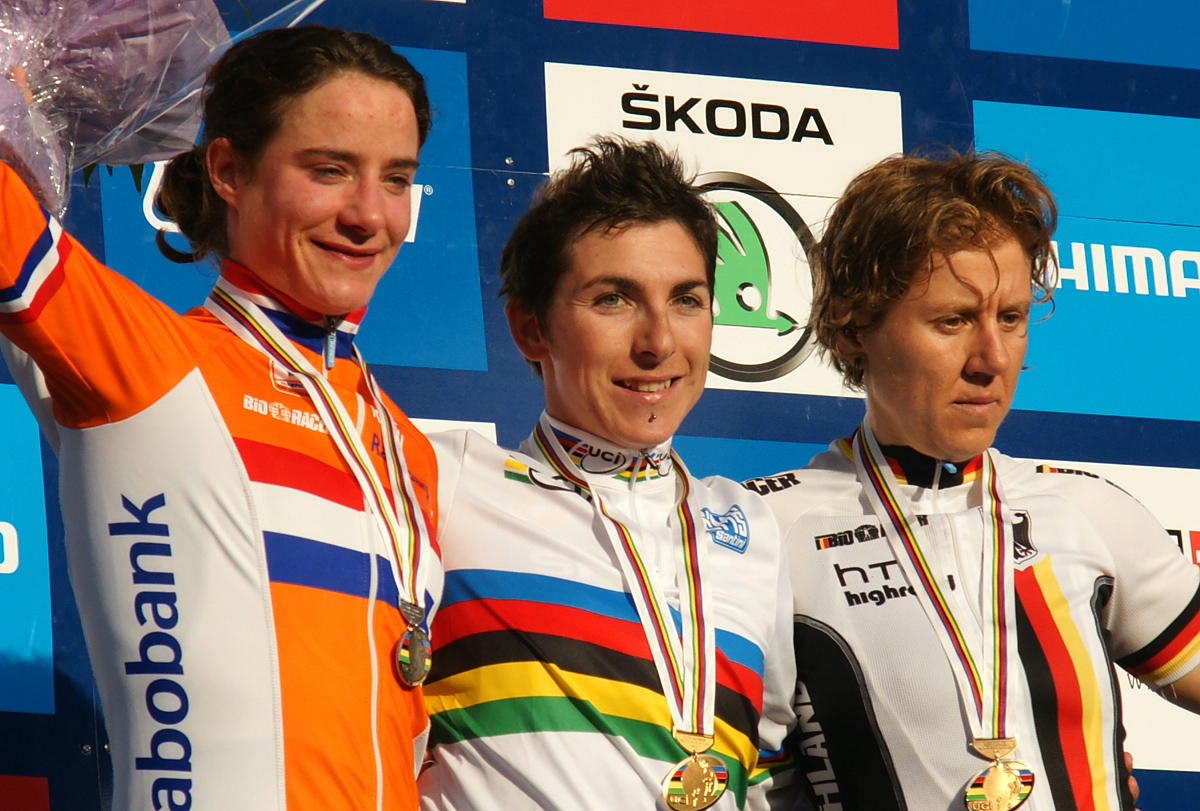
Podium women's road race

Event	Gold		Silver		Bronze	
Men's Events
Men's road race	Mark Cavendish; Great Britain	5h 40' 27"	Matthew Goss; Australia	s.t.	André Greipel; Germany	s.t.
Men's time trial	Tony Martin; Germany	53' 43.85"	Bradley Wiggins; Great Britain	+ 1' 15.83"	Fabian Cancellara; Switzerland	+ 1' 20.59"
Women's Events
Women's road race	Giorgia Bronzini; Italy	3h 21' 28"	Marianne Vos; Netherlands	s.t.	Ina-Yoko Teutenberg; Germany	s.t.
Women's time trial	Judith Arndt; Germany	37' 07.38"	Linda Villumsen; New Zealand	+ 21.73"	Emma Pooley; Great Britain	+ 24.13"
Men's Under-23 Events
Men's under-23 road race	Arnaud Démare; France	3h 52' 16"	Adrien Petit; France	s.t.	Andrew Fenn; Great Britain	s.t.
Men's under-23 time trial	Luke Durbridge; Australia	42' 47.13"	Rasmus Quaade; Denmark	+ 35.68"	Michael Hepburn; Australia	+ 46.47"
Men's Juniors Events
Men's junior road race	Pierre-Henri Lecuisinier; France	2h 48' 58"	Martijn Degreve; Belgium	s.t.	Steven Lammertink; Netherlands	s.t.
Men's junior time trial	Mads Würtz Schmidt; Denmark	35' 07.68"	James Oram; New Zealand	+ 4.11"	David Edwards; Australia	+ 20.79"
Women's Juniors Events
Women's junior road race	Lucy Garner; Great Britain	1h 46' 17"	Jessy Druyts; Belgium	s.t.	Christina Siggaard; Denmark	s.t.
Women's junior time trial	Jessica Allen; Australia	19' 18.63"	Elinor Barker; Great Britain	+ 1.84"	Mieke Kröger; Germany	+ 2.80"

== Medal table ==
Place	Nation	1st place, gold medalist(s)	2nd place, silver medalist(s)	3rd place, bronze medalist(s)	Total
1	Great Britain	2	2	2	6
2	Australia	2	1	2	5
3	France	2	1	0	3
4	Germany	2	0	3	5
5	Denmark	1	1	1	3
6	Italy	1	0	0	1
7	Belgium	0	2	0	2
7	New Zealand	0	2	0	2
9	Netherlands	0	1	1	2
10	Switzerland	0	0	1	1
Total		10	10	10	30
