= Whoosh–NZ Cycling Project =

New Zealand cycling team

Team information
- UCI code: NZP
- Registered: New Zealand
- Founded: 2022
- Discipline: Road
- Status: UCI Continental
- Website: Team home page

Key personnel
- General manager: James Canny
- Team managers: Roman Van Uden; Hayden Godfrey; Peter Latham

Team name history
- 2022–2025; 2026–: MitoQ–NZ Cycling Project; Whoosh–NZ Cycling Project

Whoosh–NZ Cycling Project is a New Zealand UCI Continental cycling team focusing on road bicycle racing. The team is run by ex-professional Roman Van Uden with James Canny, ex elite rider, the founder.

== Team roster ==
As of 17 January 2022

Rider	Date of birth
Josh Burnett (NZL)	26 October 2000 (age 25)
Joe Chapman (NZL)	27 May 1981 (age 45)
Kees Duyvesteyn (NZL)	19 May 1998 (age 28)
Theo Gilbertson (NZL)	22 August 2000 (age 26)
George Jackson (NZL)	20 February 2000 (age 26)
Hayden Mccormick (NZL)	1 January 1994 (age 32)

Rider	Date of birth
Luke Mcdermott (NZL)	16 September 1993 (age 32)
Ben Oliver (NZL)	16 December 1996 (age 29)
Karl Poole (NZL)	8 May 1988 (age 38)
Joshua Scott (NZL)	9 January 1999 (age 27)
James Williamson (NZL)	27 March 1989 (age 37)

== Major wins ==
2023
Gravel and Tar Classic, Ben Oliver
