= Bolton Equities Black Spoke =

New Zealand cycling team

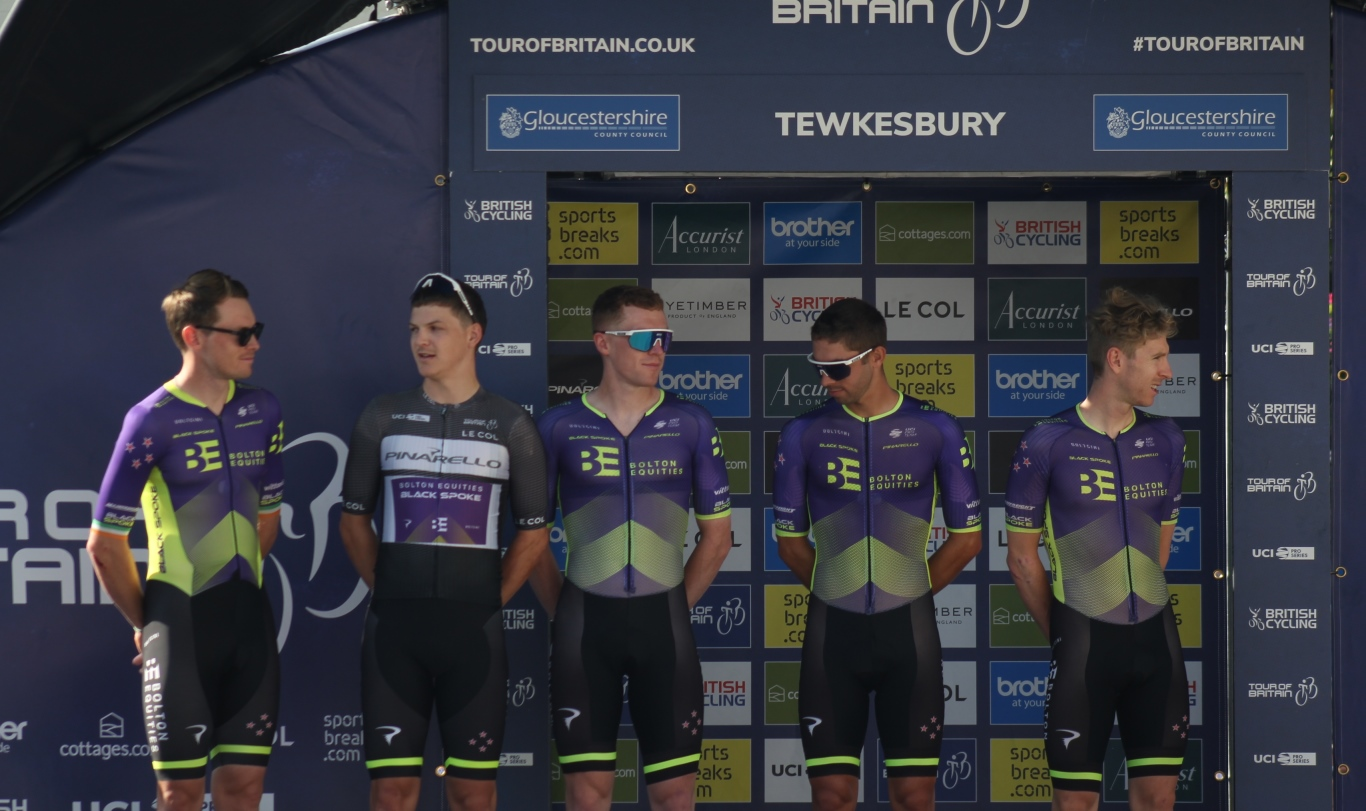

Team information
- UCI code: BEB
- Registered: New Zealand
- Founded: 2020
- Disbanded: 2023
- Discipline: Road
- Status: UCI Continental (2020–2022); UCI ProTeam (2023)
- Bicycles: Pinarello
- Components: Shimano; Giordana; Lazer; Pirelli
- Website: Team home page

Key personnel
- General manager: Scott Guyton

Team name history
- 2020; 2021; 2022; 2023: Black Spoke Pro Cycling Academy; Black Spoke Pro Cycling; Bolton Equities Black Spoke Pro Cycling; Bolton Equities Black Spoke

Bolton Equities Black Spoke was a New Zealand UCI ProTeam status cycling team focusing on road bicycle racing. The team was run by ex-professional Scott Guyton and established in 2020, but folded at the end of the 2023 season.

== History ==
=== Formation ===
The team was established in 2020 with the involvement of Australian commentator and former cyclist David McKenzie and high-performance coach Marc Prutton.

Backing was provided by businessman Murray Bolton along with other sponsors, institutional supporters and suppliers such as the Armstrong Motor Group, Cycling New Zealand, Giordana, Lazer, Pinarello and Shimano. Other sponsors and equipment suppliers have included Kiwivelo, Park Tool, Pirelli, Pro Bikegear, and Thule Group. In 2022 Bolton Equities run by Murray Bolton stepped up to be the naming sponsor of the team.

=== 2022 ===
The 2022 season started with the New Zealand Cycle Classic where the team took Stage 1 of the race putting Regan Gough into yellow. Stage 2 of the race only Mark Stewart was able to keep up with the front bunch and sprinted to second on the stage moving him into yellow. Stage 3 was a mass sprint with Stewart home safely in yellow and Mitchel Fitzsimons sprinting to seventh. The Queen stage of the Tour was Stage 4 finishing up Te Wharau Hill, Stewart took the stage attacking away from UCI WorldTour Professional George Bennett New Zealand National team and Ollie Jones (St George Continental Cycling Team). The final stage was a short lap race around the main streets of Wellington Regan Gough attacked with a few kilometers to go and managed to hold off the other riders to win ahead of the sprinters. The team won the overall and Mountain classification with Mark Stewart plus 3 stages.

Next on the calendar for the team was the New Zealand National Time Trial and Road Race Championships. The time trial was held first with Regan Gough winning the elite competition and Logan Currie the Under-23. Being the largest New Zealand UCI cycling team they were the favorites to win the road race. The road race was cut short due to strong winds from Cyclone Dovi and at the time James Fouché was in a break alone and so he was deemed the winner. The Oceania Road Cycling Championships were held in Australia and while riding for New Zealand Currie won the Under-23 Time trial with Fouché winning the elite road race and Gate the elite Time trial.

With the home races done the team headed abroad to start their European season. The first European race for the team was Tour du Loir-et-Cher where the team managed a podium in stage 2 with Aaron Gate and Luke Mudgway finishing in fourteenth overall. Then off to the Arno Wallaard Memorial where Tom Sexton missed the move of the day and finished in fourteenth 1:30 down on the winner. The final race for April was the 2022 International Tour of Hellas, a five stage race in Greece. In stage 1 Gate managed to get into the breakaway with Fouche there to help pull the breakaway where Gate managed to stay away solo and win the stage by 1:46 to Eduard Prades (Caja Rural–Seguros RGA) who mistakenly celebrated thinking he had won. Gate held the jersey through all the following stages with hard work from the team to take home the turquoise leaders jersey as the Overall winner Stewart finished third overall 1:56 down on Gate. This was the teams first Overall victory outside of Oceania.

May started with the Ronde van Overijssel where Mudgway finished eleventh in the bunch sprint. Then on to the Arnhem–Veenendaal Classic where the top rider was Mudgway who finished twentieth. The team was unlucky in the Antwerp Port Epic with none of their riders making the front group, Ryan Christensen was first home nearly nine minutes down on winner Florian Vermeersch (Lotto–Soudal). The team the headed to Circuit de Wallonie a race for sprinters, once again missing out on a top ten finish Gate finished eleventh. Gate kept up with the front bunch at the Grote Prijs Marcel Kint finishing in twenty-fourth. The Tour de la Mirabelle was the next stage race for the team. It started with a short 2.6 km prologue where Currie placed best in twelfth six seconds down. The first road stage ended in a mass sprint with everyone keeping up but no one placing. Stage three was a hilly stage with a flat ending, Currie and James Oram were able to keep up to contest the reduced bunch sprint. They didn't place in the top ten however, because they kept up they moved into fourth and sixth overall respectively with Currie moving into the white jersey of the young rider classification. The final stage was hilly with 48 riders making it to the finish together Ethan Batt placed fifth in the sprint with Oram and Currie finishing on the same time securing their places in the GC and the youth jersey.

The Ronde de l'Oise came back after two years of cancellation due to COVID-19. The team set their sights on overall victory. Stage one started with Fouché getting into the breakaway of the day then being one of two riders left. He then attacked and gained an advantage over break-away companion Aritz Bagües of 44 seconds to win the opening stage solo. Gate sprinted to third on the stage 1:19 down on Fouché. Stages 2 and 3 ended in bunch sprints with both Fouché and Gate keeping up to retain first and third overall going into the final stage. The final stage was the flattest stage of the race with all riders except Sexton keeping up for the bunch sprint, unluckily for Gate Jason Tesson won the final stage and gave Tesson enough time to move up to third overall pushing Gate down to fourth. Fouché kept his overall lead and took home the white leaders jersey. Remaining in France the team headed to the Tour d'Eure-et-Loir where Ryan Christensen was the designated sprinter, sprinting to ninth, eleventh and third in the three-stage race claiming fifth overall. It was then off to the first UCI ProSeries race for the team the Tour of Belgium. Stage 1 of the race started with Gate trying to get into the break of the day but getting caught a few kilometers later. Luke Mudgway managed to get into the break though, with 70 km to go he attacked but was caught by the break with 68 km to go. With 2 laps to go the race was back together a high-speed punchy finish combined with a puncture for Christensen meant the Gate was best finisher in 30th place.

In December 2022, Union Cycliste Internationale announced that Bolton Equities Black Spoke Pro Cycling was granted a UCI ProTeam licence for 2023 season.

=== 2023 ===
The team now a UCI ProTeam changed their name to Bolton Equities Black Spoke.

After their main sponsor, Bolton Equities announced the end of their sponsorship at the end of the 2023 season, the team announced its closure on November that year.

== Team roster ==
As of 14 January 2023

Rider	Date of birth
Ethan Batt (NZL)	20 August 1998 (age 28)
Matthew Bostock (GBR)	16 July 1997 (age 29)
Josh Burnett (NZL)	26 October 2000 (age 25)
Ryan Christensen (NZL)	12 September 1996 (age 30)
Logan Currie (NZL)	24 June 2001 (age 25)
Mitchel Fitzsimons (NZL)	9 January 2003 (age 23)
James Fouché (NZL)	28 March 1998 (age 28)
Aaron Gate (NZL)	26 November 1990 (age 35)
Regan Gough (NZL)	6 October 1996 (age 30)
George Jackson (NZL)	20 February 2000 (age 26)

Rider	Date of birth
Ollie Jones (NZL)	23 April 1996 (age 30)
Josh Kench (NZL)	6 May 2001 (age 25)
Luke Mudgway (NZL)	12 June 1996 (age 30)
Bailey O'Donnell (NZL)	25 September 2000 (age 26)
James Oram (NZL)	17 June 1993 (age 33)
Jacob Scott (GBR)	14 June 1995 (age 31)
Thomas Sexton (NZL)	19 November 1998 (age 27)
Mark Stewart (GBR)	25 August 1995 (age 31)
Rory Townsend (IRL)	30 June 1995 (age 31)
Paul Wright (NZL)	3 February 1998 (age 28)

== Major wins ==
2020
Stage 1 New Zealand Cycle Classic, Aaron Gate
Gravel and Tar, Hayden McCormick
2021
New Zealand Cycle Classic

Stage 2, Luke Mudgway
Stage 5, Campbell Stewart

Gravel and Tar, Aaron Gate
New Zealand National Time Trial Championships, Aaron Gate
Stages 2 & 3 A Travers les Hauts de France, Campbell Stewart
2022
Overall New Zealand Cycle Classic, Mark Stewart

Stage 1 (TTT) (Note: The riders on the squad were Josh Kench, Logan Currie, Regan Gough, Mark Stewart, Ryan Christensen and Mitchel Fitzsimons)
Stage 4, Mark Stewart
Stage 5, Regan Gough

New Zealand National Time Trial Championships, Regan Gough
New Zealand National U23 Time Trial Championships, Logan Currie
New Zealand National Road Race Championships, James Fouché
Overall International Tour of Hellas, Aaron Gate

Stage 1, Aaron Gate

Ronde de l'Oise, James Fouché

Stage 1, James Fouché

Overall Grand Prix Cycliste de Gemenc, Luke Mudgway
Overall Tour of Romania, Mark Stewart

Prologue, Tom Sexton

Stage 3 Tour de Luxembourg, Aaron Gate
2023
Overall New Zealand Cycle Classic, James Oram

Stage 1, James Oram
Stage 3, Josh Burnett
Stage 4, Luke Mudgway

New Zealand National Criterium Championships, Luke Mudgway
New Zealand National Time Trial Championships, Aaron Gate
New Zealand National U23 Time Trial Championships, Logan Currie
New Zealand National Road Race Championships, James Oram
Prologue International Tour of Hellas, Aaron Gate
Overall Tour of Taihu Lake, George Jackson

Points classification, George Jackson
Young rider classification, George Jackson
Stages 3 & 4, George Jackson

== National champions ==
2021
New Zealand Time Trial, Aaron Gate
2022
New Zealand Time Trial, Regan Gough
New Zealand Under-23 Time Trial, Logan Currie
New Zealand Road Race, James Fouché
2023
New Zealand Criterium, Luke Mudgway
New Zealand Time Trial, Aaron Gate
New Zealand Under-23 Time Trial, Logan Currie
New Zealand Road Race, James Oram
New Zealand Under-23 Road Race, Logan Currie
