= Tour of Southland =

Road bicycle racing stage race in New Zealand

Race details
- Date: Early November
- Region: Southland Region, New Zealand
- English name: Tour of Southland
- Local name: SBS Bank Tour of Southland
- Discipline: Road race
- Competition: National Tour Event
- Type: 7 Day Stage Race
- Organiser: Cycling Southland
- Race director: Bruce Ross
- Web site: www.tourofsouthland.com

History
- First edition: 1956
- Editions: 68 (as of 2024)
- First winner: Kelvin Hastie (NZL)
- Most wins: 8 wins: Brian Fowler (NZL)
- Most recent: Josh Burnett (NZL)

The Tour of Southland is a road bicycle racing stage race held in the Southland region of New Zealand. From 2005 until 2009, the Tour of Southland has been part of the UCI Oceania Tour however the 2010 event was held as a National Tour. The Tour is held annually in November. The race is organised and delivered by Cycling Southland. The race's title sponsor is SBS Bank, a New Zealand bank, which is the country's largest building society.

== Multiple winners ==
Wins	Country	Name	Years
8	New Zealand	Brian Fowler	1985, 1986, 1987, 1988, 1989, 1990, 1992, 1995
4	New Zealand	Hayden Roulston	2006, 2007, 2008, 2010
3	New Zealand	Warwick Dalton	1959, 1961, 1969
3	New Zealand	Tino Tabak	1965, 1966, 1967
3	New Zealand	Michael Vink	2018, 2019, 2021
2	New Zealand	Paul Jesson	1976, 1978
2	New Zealand	Stephen Cox	1981, 1982
2	New Zealand	Jack Swart	1983, 1984
2	New Zealand	Graeme Miller	1997, 1999
2	New Zealand	Scott Guyton	1998, 2003
2	(United States) USA	John Lieswyn	2002, 2004
2	New Zealand	Gordon McCauley	1996, 2005
2	New Zealand	Aaron Gate	2016, 2020
2	New Zealand	Josh Burnett	2022, 2024

== List of winners ==
Year	Country	Men's winner
1956	New Zealand	Kelvin Hastie
1957	New Zealand	Tom Tindale
1959	New Zealand	Warwick Dalton
1960	New Zealand	Gary Ulmer
1961	New Zealand	Warwick Dalton
1962	New Zealand	Tony Walsh
1963	New Zealand	Dick Johnstone
1964	Australia	Malcolm Powell
1965	New Zealand	Tino Tabak
1966	New Zealand	Tino Tabak
1967	New Zealand	Tino Tabak
1968	New Zealand	Merv Davis
1969	New Zealand	Warwick Dalton
1970	New Zealand	David Gee
1971	New Zealand	John Dean
1972	New Zealand	Blair Stockwell
1973	New Zealand	Michael Hughes
1974	New Zealand	Bruce Ramsey
1975	New Zealand	Chris Hogan
1976	New Zealand	Paul Jesson
1977	New Zealand	Wayne Perkinson
1978	New Zealand	Paul Jesson
1979	New Zealand	Eric McKenzie
1980	New Zealand	Anthony Cuff
1981	New Zealand	Stephen Cox
1982	New Zealand	Stephen Cox
1983	New Zealand	Jack Swart
1984	New Zealand	Jack Swart
1985	New Zealand	Brian Fowler
1986	New Zealand	Brian Fowler
1987	New Zealand	Brian Fowler
1988	New Zealand	Brian Fowler
1989	New Zealand	Brian Fowler
1990	New Zealand	Brian Fowler
1991	New Zealand	Stuart Lowe
1992	New Zealand	Brian Fowler
1993	New Zealand	Landrey Burt
1994	New Zealand	Doug Bath
1995	New Zealand	Brian Fowler
1996	New Zealand	Gordon McCauley
1997	New Zealand	Graeme Miller
1998	New Zealand	Scott Guyton
1999	New Zealand	Graeme Miller
2000	New Zealand	Glen Mitchell
2001	New Zealand	Karl Moore
2002	(United States) USA	John Lieswyn
2003	New Zealand	Scott Guyton
2004	(United States) USA	John Lieswyn
2005	New Zealand	Gordon McCauley
2006	New Zealand	Hayden Roulston
2007	New Zealand	Hayden Roulston
2008	New Zealand	Hayden Roulston
2009	New Zealand	Heath Blackgrove
2010	New Zealand	Hayden Roulston
2011	New Zealand	Josh Atkins
2012	New Zealand	Mike Northey
2013	New Zealand	James Oram
2014	Australia	Mitchell Lovelock-Fay
2015	New Zealand	Brad Evans
2016	New Zealand	Aaron Gate
2017	Canada	James Piccoli
2018	New Zealand	Michael Vink
2019	New Zealand	Michael Vink
2020	New Zealand	Aaron Gate
2021	New Zealand	Michael Vink
2022	New Zealand	Josh Burnett
2023	(United Kingdom) Great Britain	Daniel Gardner
2024	New Zealand	Josh Burnett
