= Gravel and Tar Classic =

Race details
- Date: January
- Region: Manawatū-Whanganui
- Discipline: Road
- Competition: UCI Oceania Tour
- Type: one-day
- Web site: gravelandtar.com

History
- First edition: 2016
- Editions: 8 (as of 2024)
- First winner: Logan Griffin (NZL)
- Most wins: No repeat winners
- Most recent: Josh Burnett (NZL)

The Gravel and Tar Classic is a one-day cycling race, held annually in the Manawatu region of New Zealand, since 2016, finishing in Palmerston North. It is rated 1.2 and has been part of UCI Oceania Tour since 2018. The race is primarily on sealed roads, however the highlight of the race is the multiple gravel sectors (usually 5 or 6) throughout the course. The race is now considered to be the toughest one-day elite race in the Oceania region. The race is held in January each year, making it one of the first races on the UCI Calendar, and a key chance for teams and riders to gain early UCI points. The event has seen teams enter from countries such as Sweden, Japan, the US, and Australia, along with the best New Zealand men's trade teams.

Palmerston North was the starting location of the race for its first three years, before the race start moved to its current location in Feilding in 2019. The race course often transverses the gravel roads on the watersheds near Pohangina, and the peloton is easily fractured due to punctures & crashes on these sectors. As a result of these fractures the race will very rarely see large bunches finish together, and many racers miss the time cut or are unable to finish.

The Gravel and Tar La Femme is the women's version of the race, held on the same day, and introduced in 2019. The La Femme race also holds a UCI 1.2 rating, and is one of a few elite female cycle races in the world where the prizemoney on offer is the same as the men's race. The race generally follows a shorter but similar course to the men's race, starting and finishing in the same locations.

In 2021, the race expanded to include a series of wraparound events over the race weekend, being labelled the Manawatu Cycling Spree. This includes:

- Gravel and Tar Classic
- Gravel and Tar La Femme
- Slicks and Stones – An event for all amateur cyclists who wish to challenge themselves by riding close to 100 km of the elite Gravel and Tar circuit. This even first took place in 2019.
- Slicks and Stones Lite – A shorter amateur circuit for those wishing to try their skill on an easier course, with the Slicks and Stones eBike Challenge, another new category, also taking place over the same 46 km circuit.
- Retro Bike Ride – A short retro themed fun ride, where donations and proceeds from this event go to the Arohanui Hospice in Palmerston North.
- Family Fun Ride – A "get moving" family event that is part of the festival to enable cycling participation for all ages and abilities.
- Arapuke Mountain Bike Challenge – The Arapuke Classic, organised by the Manawatū Mountain Bike Club, takes riders over their choice of three courses, from 13 to 41 km of single track, in the Tararua Range foothills near Palmerston North. For 2021, there's also an e-bike category over 25 km.
- Nieuw Normal Extreme Mountain Bike Challenge – An extreme mountain bike event, held at the new Green's Estate venue.

== Men's race ==
Year	Country	Rider	Team
2016	New Zealand	Logan Griffin	Oliver's Real Food Racing
2017	Australia	Robert Stannard	Mitchelton Scott
2018	Australia	Ethan Berends	Mobius–BridgeLane
2019	New Zealand	Luke Mudgway	EvoPro Racing
2020	New Zealand	Hayden Mccormick	Black Spoke Pro Cycling Academy
2021	New Zealand	Aaron Gate	Black Spoke Pro Cycling
2022	No race due to COVID-19 pandemic in New Zealand		
2023	New Zealand	Ben Oliver	MitoQ–NZ Cycling Project
2024	New Zealand	Josh Burnett	MitoQ–NZ Cycling Project
2025	No race due to lack of entries		

== Women's race ==
Year	Country	Rider	Team
2019	Australia	Brodie Chapman	Tibco–Silicon Valley Bank
2020	New Zealand	Niamh Fisher-Black	New Zealand
2021	New Zealand	Olivia Ray	New Zealand
2022	No race due to COVID-19 pandemic in New Zealand		
2023	No race due to lack of entries		
2024	New Zealand	Kate McCarthy	Green Monkey
2025	No race due to lack of entries		
