= New Zealand Cycle Classic =

New Zealand multi-day road cycling race

Race details
- Date: Late-January
- Region: Masterton Region, New Zealand
- English name: New Zealand Cycle Classic
- Nickname(s): NZCC
- Discipline: Road race
- Competition: UCI Oceania Tour
- Type: New Zealand's Premier Stage race
- Organiser: Jorge Sandoval
- Race director: Jorge Sandoval
- Web site: www.cycletournz.com

History
- First edition: 1988
- Editions: 37 (as of 2024)
- First winner: Darren Rush (NZL)
- Most wins: Brian Fowler (NZL) (4 wins)
- Most recent: Aaron Gate (NZL)

The New Zealand Cycle Classic (previously known as the Tour of Wellington) was a road cycling race held in and around the Wairarapa near Wellington, New Zealand. The race was a men's competition over five stages and part of the UCI Oceania Tour.

In August 2024, it was announced by race organiser Jorge Sandoval that the race was being cancelled due to difficulty finding a naming rights sponsor.

== Multiple victories ==
Wins	Name	Country	Years
4	Brian Fowler	New Zealand	1989, 1990, 1991, 1992
2	Ric Reid	New Zealand	1994, 1996
2	Hayden Roulston	New Zealand	2006, 2007
2	Aaron Gate	New Zealand	2019, 2024

== Winners ==
Year	Country	Rider	Team
1988	New Zealand	Darren Rush	
1989	New Zealand	Brian Fowler	
1990	New Zealand	Brian Fowler	
1991	New Zealand	Brian Fowler	
1992	New Zealand	Brian Fowler	
1993	New Zealand	Clark Richards	
1994	New Zealand	Ric Reid	
1995	Australia	Robbie McEwen	
1996	New Zealand	Ric Reid	
1997	Australia	Corey Sweet	
1998	Australia	Hayden Bradbury	
1999	New Zealand	Julian Dean	
2000	New Zealand	Brendon Vesty	
2001	France	Chris Jenner	Fuji Xerox
2002	New Zealand	Robin Reid	Avanti Cycles
2003	New Zealand	Matthew Yates	Team Subway
2004	Canada	Eric Wohlberg	Trust House
2005	Australia	Matthew Lloyd	Team Jayco
2006	New Zealand	Hayden Roulston	Team Subway
2007	New Zealand	Hayden Roulston	Trek-Zookeepers Café
2008	Australia	Travis Meyer	SouthAustralia.com–AIS
2009	Australia	Peter McDonald	Drapac–Porsche Cycling
2010	New Zealand	Michael Torckler	Cardno Team
2011	New Zealand	George Bennett	Cardno Team
2012	Australia	Jay McCarthy	Team Jayco–AIS
2013	Australia	Nathan Earle	Huon Salmon–Genesys Wealth Advisers
2014	New Zealand	Michael Vink	Team Budget Forklifts
2015	New Zealand	Taylor Gunman	Avanti Racing Team
2016	Australia	Ben O'Connor	Avanti Racing Team
2017	New Zealand	Joseph Cooper	IsoWhey Sports SwissWellness
2018	New Zealand	Hayden McCormick	New Zealand (national team)
2019	New Zealand	Aaron Gate	EvoPro Racing
2020	Australia	Rylee Field	Team BridgeLane
2021	New Zealand	Corbin Strong	New Zealand (national team)
2022	Great Britain	Mark Stewart	Bolton Equities Black Spoke Pro Cycling
2023	New Zealand	James Oram	Bolton Equities Black Spoke
2024	New Zealand	Aaron Gate	New Zealand (national team)

== Most stage wins ==
Most stage wins by riders. Listed are those riders with more than three stage wins

Wins	Name	Country
9	Hayden Roulston	New Zealand
6	Robin Reid	New Zealand
5	Nathan Earle	Australia
4	Regan Gough	New Zealand
4	Greg Henderson	New Zealand
4	Gordon McCauley	New Zealand
4	Brendon Vesty	New Zealand
3	Aaron Gate	New Zealand
3	Peter Latham	New Zealand

Stage wins by each country

Wins	Country
94	New Zealand
41	Australia
9	Great Britain
5	Netherlands
3	Canada
2	Hong Kong
1	Switzerland
1	United States of America
1	South Africa
