= List of 2015 UCI Professional Continental and Continental teams =

Listed below are the UCI professional continental and continental teams that compete in road bicycle racing events of the UCI Continental Circuits organised by the Union Cycliste Internationale (UCI). The UCI Continental Circuits are divided in 5 continental zones, America, Europe, Asia, Africa and Oceania.

All lists updated as of 12 February 2015.

== UCI professional continental teams ==
According to the UCI Rulebook,

"a professional continental team is an organisation created to take part in road events open to professional continental teams. It is known by a unique name and registered with the UCI in accordance with the provisions below.

- The professional continental team comprises all the riders registered with the UCI as members of the team, the paying agent, the sponsors and all other persons contracted by the paying agent and/or the sponsors to provide for the continuing operation of the team (manager, team manager, coach, paramedical assistant, mechanic, etc.).
- Each professional continental team must employ at least 14 riders, 2 team managers and 3 other staff (paramedical assistants, mechanics, etc.) on a full time basis for the whole registration year."

=== List of 2015 UCI Africa Tour professional teams ===
Code	Official Team Name	Country
MTN	MTN–Qhubeka	South Africa

=== List of 2015 UCI America Tour professional teams ===
Code	Official Team Name	Country
COL	Colombia	Colombia
TNN	Team Novo Nordisk	United States
UHC	UnitedHealthcare	United States

=== List of 2015 UCI Asia Tour professional teams ===
Code	Official Team Name	Country
No registered teams

=== List of 2015 UCI Europe Tour professional teams ===
Code	Official Team Name	Country
TSV	Topsport Vlaanderen–Baloise	Belgium
WGG	Wanty–Groupe Gobert	Belgium
CLT	Cult Energy Pro Cycling	Denmark
CJR	Caja Rural–Seguros RGA	Spain
BSE	Bretagne–Séché Environnement	France
COF	Cofidis	France
EUC	Team Europcar	France
BOA	Bora–Argon 18	Germany
AND	Androni Giocattoli–Sidermec	Italy
BAR	Bardiani–CSF	Italy
NIP	Nippo–Vini Fantini	Italy
STH	Southeast Pro Cycling	Italy
ROO	Team Roompot	Netherlands
CCC	CCC–Sprandi–Polkowice	Poland
RVL	RusVelo	Russia

=== List of 2015 UCI Oceania Tour professional teams ===
Code	Official Team Name	Country
DPC	Drapac Professional Cycling	Australia

== UCI continental teams ==
According to the UCI Rulebook, "a UCI continental team is a team of road riders recognised and licensed to take part in events on the continental calendars by the national federation of the nationality of the majority of its riders and registered with the UCI. The precise structure (legal and financial status, registration, guarantees, standard contract, etc.) of these teams shall be determined by the regulations of the national federation."

Riders may be professional or amateur. The nation under which the team is registered is the nation under which the majority of its riders are registered, a rule which the men's continental teams share with the UCI women's teams.

=== List of 2015 UCI Africa Tour teams ===
Code	Official Team Name	Country
GSP	Groupement Sportif des Pétroliers d´Algérie	Algeria
VCS	Vélo Club Sovac	Algeria

=== List of 2015 UCI America Tour teams ===
Code	Official Team Name	Country
BAP	Buenos Aires Provincia	Argentina
SLS	San Luis Somos Todos	Argentina
SEP	Sindicato de Empleados Publicos de San Juan	Argentina
FUN	Carrefour Funvic Soul Cycling Team	Brazil
GQC	Garneau–Québecor	Canada
HRB	H&R Block Pro Cycling	Canada
SPC	Silber Pro Cycling Team	Canada
EPM	EPM–UNE–Área Metropolitana	Colombia
MOT	Movistar Team América	Colombia
ANQ	Orgullo Antioqueño	Colombia
DCT	Inteja–MMR Dominican Cycling Team	Dominican Republic
ECU	Team Ecuador	Ecuador
STF	Start–Massi Cycling Team	Paraguay
IPC	InCycle-Cannondale	Puerto Rico
AIR	Airgas–Safeway	United States
ACT	Astellas	United States
BDT	Axeon Cycling Team	United States
CSN	Champion System-Stan's NoTubes	United States
HSD	Hincapie Racing Team	United States
IRT	IRT Racing	United States
JHB	Jamis–Hagens Berman	United States
JBC	Jelly Belly–Maxxis	United States
LRT	Lupus Racing Team	United States
OPM	Optum–Kelly Benefit Strategies	United States
SSC	Team SmartStop	United States

=== List of 2015 UCI Asia Tour teams ===
Code	Official Team Name	Country
IAT	Beijing Innova Cycling Team	China
YDL	China Yindongli Hainan–Wildto	China
LSL	Team Lvshan Landscape	China
	China Cooperation Development Cycling Team	China
CWJ	Jilun Shakeland Cycling Team	China
GTC	China Continental Team of Gansu Bank	China
MSS	Giant–Champion System	China
	Holy Brother Cycling Team	China
HEN	Hengxiang Cycling Team	China
NTC	Ningxia Sports Lottery–Focus Cycling Team	China
TYD	Qinghai Tianyoude Cycling Team	China
HKS	HKSI Pro Cycling Team	Hong Kong
PCT	Pegasus Continental Cycling Team	Indonesia
PKY	Pishgaman–Giant	Iran
PTS	Sepahan Pro Team	Iran
TPT	Tabriz Petrochemical Team	Iran
TSR	Tabriz Shahrdari Team	Iran
AIS	Aisan Racing Team	Japan
BGT	Bridgestone–Anchor	Japan
	C Project	Japan
	Ciervo Nara Merida Cycling Team	Japan
GRF	Gunma-Grifin Racing Team	Japan
KIN	Kinan Cycling Team	Japan
MTR	Matrix Powertag	Japan
NAS	Nasu Blasen	Japan
SMN	Shimano Racing Team	Japan
UKO	Team UKYO	Japan
BLZ	Utsunomiya Blitzen	Japan
SIL	Seven Rivers Cycling Team	Kazakhstan
V4E	Vino 4ever	Kazakhstan
GIC	Geumsan Insam Cello	South Korea
KCT	Korail Cycling Team	South Korea
KSP	KSPO	South Korea
SCT	Seoul Cycling Team	South Korea
KCP	Kuwait Cycling Project	Kuwait
CCN	CCN	Laos
NSC	National Sports Council of Malaysia	Malaysia
TSG	Terengganu Cycling Team	Malaysia
T7E	Team 7 Eleven Road Bike Philippines	Philippines
ACY	Action Cycling Team	Taiwan
ATG	Attaque Team Gusto	Taiwan
RTS	RTS–Santic Racing Team	Taiwan
SKD	Skydive Dubai–Al Ahli	United Arab Emirates

=== List of 2015 UCI Europe Tour teams ===
Code	Official Team Name	Country
AMP	Amplatz–BMC	Austria
HAC	Hrinkow Advarics Cycleangteam	Austria
RSW	Team Felbermayr–Simplon Wels	Austria
VBG	Team Vorarlberg	Austria
TIR	Tirol Cycling Team	Austria
WSA	WSA-Greenlife	Austria
BCP	Synergy Baku	Azerbaijan
BKP	BKCP–Powerplus	Belgium
CIB	Cibel	Belgium
CSH	Colba-Superano Ham	Belgium
CCB	Color Code–Aquality Protect	Belgium
COR	BKCP–Powerplus	Belgium
SUN	Sunweb–Napoleon Games	Belgium
PCW	T.Palm–Pôle Continental Wallon	Belgium
MMM	Team3M	Belgium
TFC	Telenet–Fidea	Belgium
VGS	Vastgoedservice–Golden Palace	Belgium
VER	Veranclassic–Ekoi	Belgium
WIL	Verandas Willems	Belgium
WBC	Wallonie-Bruxelles	Belgium
MCC	Minsk	Belarus
KMP	Keith Mobel-Partisan	Croatia
MKT	Meridiana–Kamen	Croatia
ASP	AC Sparta Praha	Czech Republic
AWT	AWT–GreenWay	Czech Republic
SKC	SKC TUFO Prostějov	Czech Republic
ADP	Team Dukla Praha	Czech Republic
	Bohemia Cycling Track Team	Czech Republic
WHI	Whirlpool–Author	Czech Republic
	X23–Saroni Factory Team	Czech Republic
RIW	Riwal Platform	Denmark
ABB	Team Almeborg–Bornholm	Denmark
TCQ	Team Coloquick	Denmark
TBW	Team TreFor–Blue Water	Denmark
BUR	Burgos BH	Spain
	Cafés Baqué	Spain
MUR	Murias Taldea	Spain
AUB	Auber 93	France
ADT	Armée de Terre	France
RLM	Roubaix–Lille Métropole	France
LPM	Team Marseille 13 KTM	France
JLT	JLT–Condor	United Kingdom
MGT	Madison Genesis	United Kingdom
NPC	NFTO	United Kingdom
ONE	ONE Pro Cycling	United Kingdom
RAL	Team Raleigh	United Kingdom
WGN	WIGGINS	United Kingdom
BAI	Bike Aid	Germany
LKT	LKT Team Brandenburg	Germany
TBJ	MLP Team Bergstrasse	Germany
RNR	Rad-Net Rose Team	Germany
THF	Team Heizomat	Germany
TKG	Team Kuota–Lotto	Germany
STG	Team Stölting	Germany
SGT	Team Stuttgart	Germany
UNA	Utensilnord	Hungary
SKT	An Post–Chain Reaction	Ireland
CAT	Cycling Academy	Israel
AZT	D'Amico–Bottecchia	Italy
GMT	GM Cycling Team	Italy
MGK	MG.K Vis–Vega	Italy
IDE	Team Idea 2010 ASD	Italy
UNI	Unieuro–Wilier	Italy
ALB	Alpha Baltic–Maratoni.lv	Latvia
RBD	Rietumu–Delfin	Latvia
LDT	Leopard Development Team	Luxembourg
CCD	Differdange–Losch	Luxembourg
BBD	Baby-Dump Cyclingteam	Netherlands
CJP	Cyclingteam Jo Piels	Netherlands
RIJ	Cyclingteam de Rijke	Netherlands
MET	Metec–TKH	Netherlands
PVC	Parkhotel Valkenburg Continental Team	Netherlands
RDT	Rabobank Development Team	Netherlands
SEG	SEG Racing	Netherlands
COH	Team Coop–Øster Hus	Norway
FIX	Team FixIT.no	Norway
FRB	Team Frøy-Bianchi	Norway
TJO	Team Joker	Norway
KRA	Team Ringeriks–Kraft	Norway
TSS	Team Sparebanken Sør	Norway
AJT	ActiveJet Team	Poland
DOM	Domin Sport	Poland
WIB	Wibatech–Fuji	Poland
EFP	Efapel	Portugal
LAA	LA Alumínios–Antarte	Portugal
LRJ	Louletano–Ray Just Energy	Portugal
RPB	Rádio Popular–Boavista	Portugal
TAV	Tavira	Portugal
W52	W52–Quinta da Lixa	Portugal
TCT	Tușnad Cycling Team	Romania
TIK	Itera–Katusha	Russia
LOK	Lokosphinx	Russia
ADR	Adria Mobil	Slovenia
RAR	Radenska–Ljubljana	Slovenia
NAN	Nankang–Dynatek	Serbia
ROT	Roth–Škoda	Switzerland
CKB	CK Banská Bystrica	Slovakia
DUK	Kemo–Dukla Trenčín	Slovakia
TTB	Team Tre Berg–Bianchi	Sweden
TKS	Torku Şekerspor	Turkey
AMO	Amore & Vita–Selle SMP	Ukraine
ISD	ISD Continental Team	Ukraine
KLS	Kolss BDC Team	Ukraine
KCR	Kyiv Capital Racing	Ukraine

=== List of 2015 UCI Oceania Tour teams ===
Code	Official Team Name	Country
AWS	African Wildlife Safaris Cycling Team	Australia
CMR	Charter Mason–Giant Racing Team	Australia
DSR	Data3–Symantec Racing Team p/b Scody	Australia
NSR	Navitas–Satalyst Racing Team	Australia
STR	Search2retain–Health.com.au Cycling Team	Australia
BFL	Team Budget Forklifts	Australia
ART	Avanti Racing Team	New Zealand
CCT	CCT p/b Champion System	New Zealand

== Rankings ==
For more detailed explanations of the new-for-2015 points system and detail rankings see: 2015 UCI men's road cycling rankings

Preceded by 2014	List of UCI Professional Continental and Continental teams 2015	Succeeded by 2016
