= 2015 UCI Road World Championships – Men's team time trial =

Men's team time trial
2015 UCI Road World Championships
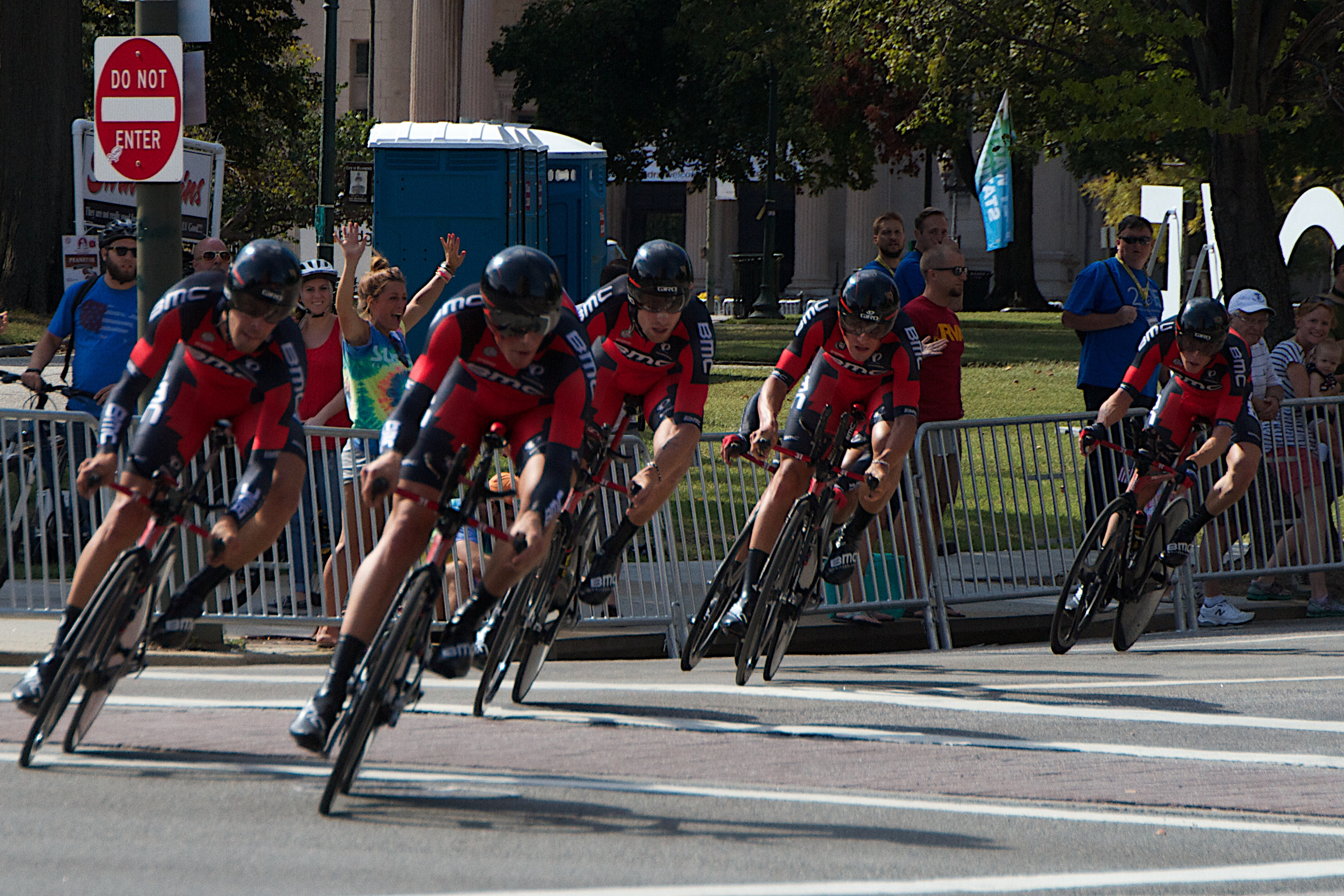
- BMC riding to victory

Race details
- Dates: September 20, 2015
- Stages: 1
- Distance: 38.6 km (24.0 mi)
- Winning time: 42' 07.97"

Medalists
	Gold	BMC Racing Team
	Silver	Etixx–Quick-Step
	Bronze	Movistar Team

The Men's team time trial of the 2015 UCI Road World Championships was a cycling event that took place on September 20, 2015, in Richmond, Virginia, United States. It was the 31st edition of the championship, and the 4th since its reintroduction in 2012. American team BMC Racing Team were the defending champions, having won in 2014.

As they did in 2014, BMC Racing Team won the title ahead of Etixx–Quick-Step by a margin of 11.35 seconds, with the Movistar Team completing the podium, 30.11 seconds down on the winning time.

== Course ==
Altitude profile of the team time trial course

The course rolled off from Henrico County at Lewis Ginter Botanical Garden, originally the Lakeside Wheel Club, founded in 1895 as a gathering spot for turn-of-the-century cyclists. The opening kilometers raced through Richmond's historic Northside neighborhoods leading into downtown. The course continued east of Richmond down rural Route 5, which parallels the 50-mile Virginia Capital Trail. The first few kilometers were scenic, flat, open roads that eventually narrowed and went through Richmond National Battlefield Park, a historic Civil War site. The race re-entered the city through Shockoe Bottom, eventually making a hard right turn on Governor Street to ascend 300 meters (980 feet). At the top, the teams had to take a sharp left turn onto the false-flat finishing straight, 680 meters (2,230 feet) to the finish.

== Qualification ==
It was an obligation for all 2015 UCI ProTeams to participate. As well as this, invitations were sent to the 20 leading teams of the 2015 UCI Europe Tour, the top 5 leading teams of the 2015 UCI America Tour and 2015 UCI Asia Tour and the leading teams of the 2015 UCI Africa Tour and 2015 UCI Oceania Tour on August 15, 2015. Teams that accepted the invitation within the deadline had the right to participate. Every participating team were allowed to register nine riders from its team roster, with the exception of stagiaires, and had to select six riders to compete in the event.

== Schedule ==
All times are in Eastern Daylight Time (UTC−4).

Date	Time	Event
September 20, 2015	13:30–15:30	Men's team time trial

== Final classification ==
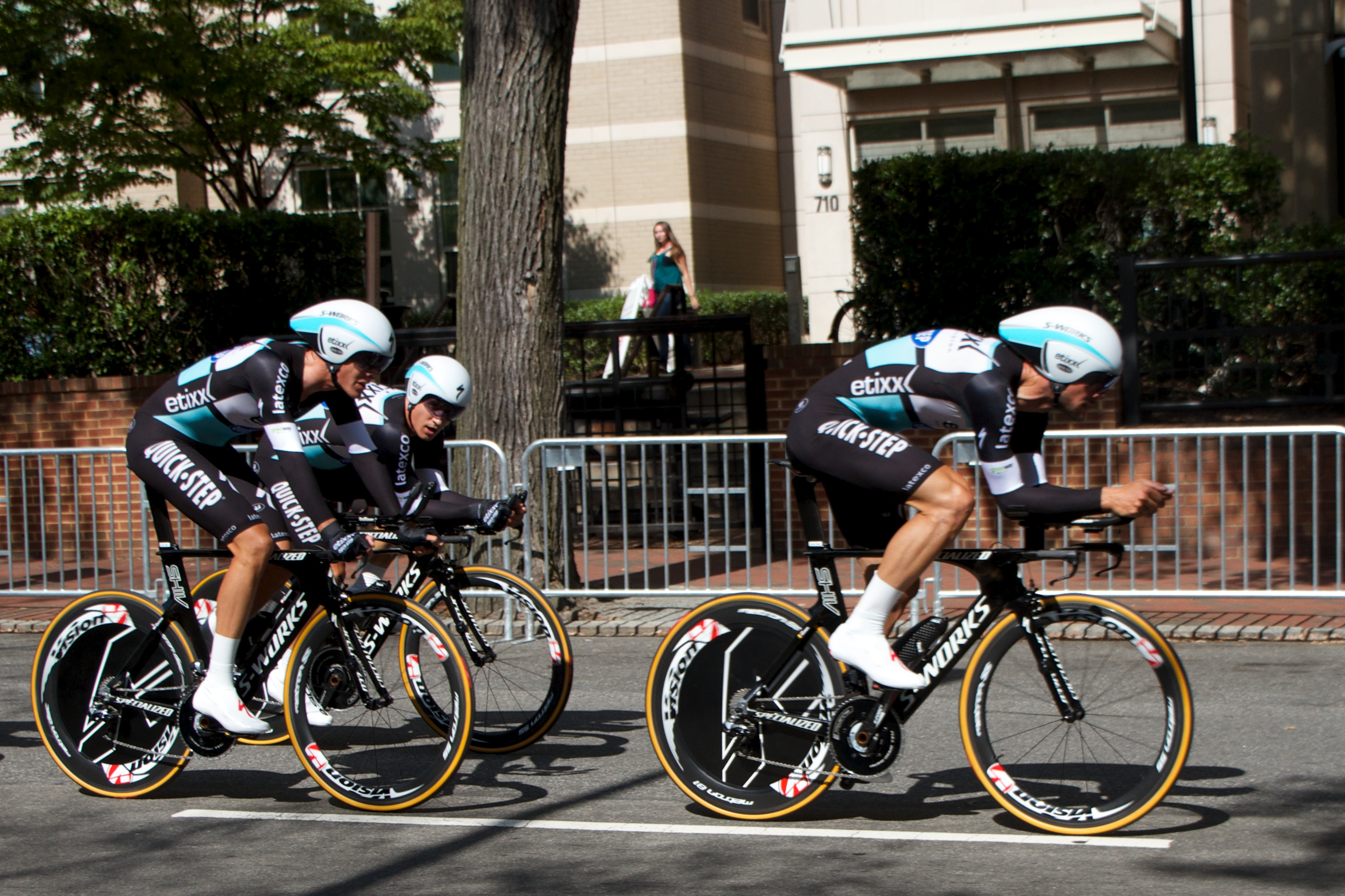
Etixx–Quick-Step finished second

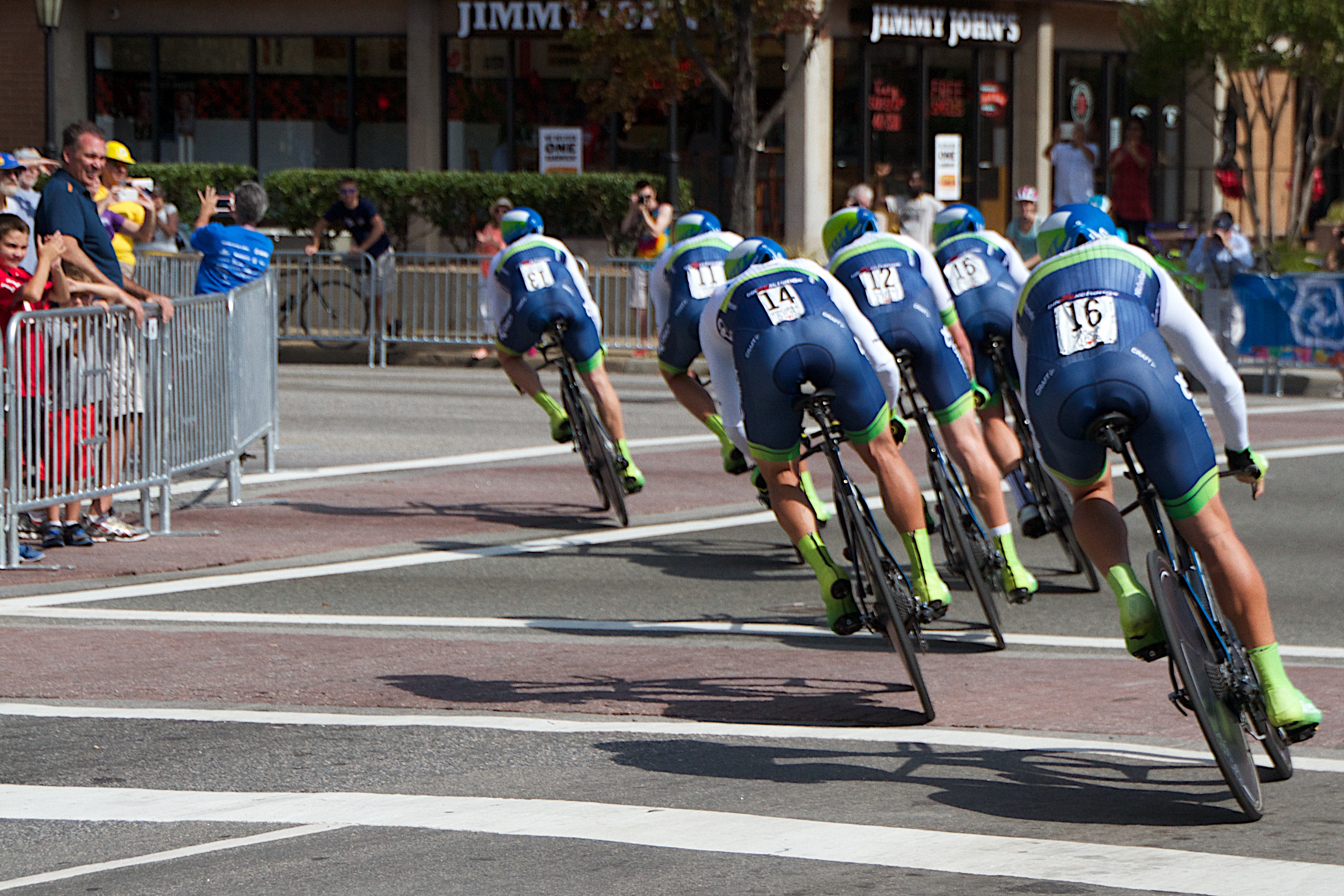
Orica–GreenEDGE finished fourth

BMC Racing won the event, beating Etixx–Quick-Step by more than 11 seconds. Tinkoff–Saxo finished last, more than 8 minutes behind the race winners, after Michael Valgren and Michael Rogers touched wheels and crashed.

Rank	Team	Riders	Time
1	(United States) BMC Racing Team	Rohan Dennis (AUS); Silvan Dillier (SUI); Stefan Küng (SUI); Daniel Oss (ITA); Taylor Phinney (USA); Manuel Quinziato (ITA)	42' 07.97"
2	(Belgium) Etixx–Quick-Step	Tom Boonen (BEL); Michał Kwiatkowski (POL); Yves Lampaert (BEL); Tony Martin (GER); Niki Terpstra (NED); Rigoberto Urán (COL)	+ 11.35"
3	(Spain) Movistar Team	Andrey Amador (CRC); Jonathan Castroviejo (ESP); Alex Dowsett (GBR); Ion Izagirre (ESP); Adriano Malori (ITA); Jasha Sütterlin (GER)	+ 30.11"
4	(Australia) Orica–GreenEDGE	Sam Bewley (NZL); Luke Durbridge (AUS); Michael Hepburn (AUS); Michael Matthews (AUS); Jens Mouris (NED); Svein Tuft (CAN)	+ 53.73"
5	(Germany) Team Giant–Alpecin	Nikias Arndt (GER); Tom Dumoulin (NED); Chad Haga (USA); Tobias Ludvigsson (SWE); Georg Preidler (AUT); Ramon Sinkeldam (NED)	+ 1' 03.69"
6	(Netherlands) LottoNL–Jumbo	Robert Gesink (NED); Wilco Kelderman (NED); Tom Leezer (NED); Maarten Tjallingii (NED); Jos van Emden (NED); Sep Vanmarcke (BEL)	+ 1' 17.03"
7	(Belgium) Lotto–Soudal	Lars Bak (DEN); Tiesj Benoot (BEL); Tony Gallopin (FRA); Greg Henderson (NZL); Jürgen Roelandts (BEL); Tim Wellens (BEL)	+ 1' 26.47"
8	(Kazakhstan) Astana	Lars Boom (NED); Jakob Fuglsang (DEN); Andriy Hryvko (UKR); Tanel Kangert (EST); Alexey Lutsenko (KAZ); Luis León Sánchez (ESP)	+ 1' 37.13"
9	(United Kingdom) Team Sky	Vasil Kiryienka (BLR); Danny Pate (USA); Salvatore Puccio (ITA); Luke Rowe (GBR); Ian Stannard (GBR); Elia Viviani (ITA)	+ 1' 41.17"
10	(United States) Trek Factory Racing	Marco Coledan (ITA); Stijn Devolder (BEL); Fabio Felline (ITA); Markel Irizar (ESP); Jesse Sergent (NZL); Riccardo Zoidl (AUT)	+ 1' 46.60"
11	(France) FDJ	Arnaud Démare (FRA); Alexandre Geniez (FRA); Mathieu Ladagnous (FRA); Johan Le Bon (FRA); Steve Morabito (SUI); Jérémy Roy (FRA)	+ 1' 48.42"
12	(United States) Cannondale–Garmin	Kristijan Koren (SLO); Sebastian Langeveld (NED); Alan Marangoni (ITA); Moreno Moser (ITA); Ramūnas Navardauskas (LTU); Dylan van Baarle (NED)	+ 1' 49.80"
13	(Switzerland) IAM Cycling	Matthias Brändle (AUT); Stef Clement (NED); Jérôme Coppel (FRA); Reto Hollenstein (SUI); Jarlinson Pantano (COL); Aleksejs Saramotins (LAT)	+ 1' 57.67"
14	(France) AG2R La Mondiale	Gediminas Bagdonas (LTU); Damien Gaudin (FRA); Patrick Gretsch (GER); Hugo Houle (CAN); Christophe Riblon (FRA); Johan Vansummeren (BEL)	+ 2' 03.73"
15	(Italy) Lampre–Merida	Mattia Cattaneo (ITA); Rui Costa (POR); Nelson Oliveira (POR); Luka Pibernik (SLO); Rubén Plaza (ESP); Jan Polanc (SLO)	+ 2' 07.61"
16	(Belgium) Topsport Vlaanderen–Baloise	Victor Campenaerts (BEL); Pieter Jacobs (BEL); Oliver Naesen (BEL); Stijn Steels (BEL); Arthur Vanoverberghe (BEL); Jelle Wallays (BEL)	+ 2' 19.32"
17	(United States) Optum–Kelly Benefit Strategies	Ryan Anderson (CAN); Jesse Anthony (USA); Guillaume Boivin (CAN); Thomas Soladay (USA); Tom Zirbel (USA); Scott Zwizanski (USA)	+ 2' 23.90"
18	(Russia) Team Katusha	Sergey Chernetskiy (RUS); Vyacheslav Kuznetsov (RUS); Sergey Lagutin (RUS); Alexander Porsev (RUS); Gatis Smukulis (LAT); Ilnur Zakarin (RUS)	+ 2' 33.13"
19	(United States) UnitedHealthcare	Carlos Alzate (COL); Adrian Hegyvary (USA); Karl Menzies (AUS); John Murphy (USA); Kiel Reijnen (USA); Bradley White (USA)	+ 2' 56.19"
20	(United States) Jelly Belly–Maxxis	Alexandr Braico (MDA); Gavin Mannion (USA); Lachlan Morton (AUS); Fred Rodriguez (USA); Taylor Sheldon (USA); Nicolae Tanovițchii (MDA)	+ 3' 41.63"
21	(United States) Hincapie Racing Team	Mac Brennan (USA); Oscar Clark (USA); Andžs Flaksis (LAT); Tyler Magner (USA); Toms Skujiņš (LAT); Dion Smith (NZL)	+ 3' 43.58"
22	(United States) Jamis–Hagens Berman	Luis Amarán (CUB); Lucas Sebastián Haedo (ARG); Daniel Jaramillo (COL); Stephen Leece (USA); Carson Miller (USA); David Williams (USA)	+ 4' 37.17"
23	(Kazakhstan) Vino 4ever	Stepan Astafyev (KAZ); Zhandos Bizhigitov (KAZ); Yevgeniy Gidich (KAZ); Dmitriy Lukyanov (KAZ); Alexandr Shushemoin (KAZ); Oleg Zemlyakov (KAZ)	+ 4' 43.84"
24	(United States) Champion System–Stan's NoTubes	Charles Cassin (USA); Drew Christopher (USA); Andrew Clemence (USA); Bryan Gomez (COL); Max Korus (USA); Conor Mullervy (USA)	+ 5' 14.51"
25	(United States) Lupus Racing Team	Matthieu Jeannes (FRA); Evan Murphy (USA); Kyle Murphy (USA); Michael Olheiser (USA); Michael Stone (USA); Thomas Vaubourzeix (FRA)	+ 5' 18.72"
26	(United States) Astellas Cycling Team	Cortlan Brown (USA); Brandon Feehery (USA); Daniel Gardner (GBR); Max Jenkins (USA); Jake Silverberg (USA); Jacob Sitler (USA)	+ 5' 58.54"
27	(Russia) Tinkoff–Saxo	Manuele Boaro (ITA); Maciej Bodnar (POL); Christopher Juul-Jensen (DEN); Michael Rogers (AUS); Peter Sagan (SVK); Michael Valgren (DEN)	+ 8' 11.44"
