= Feehery =

Feehery is a surname. Notable people with the surname include:

- Brandon Feehery (born 1992), American riding cyclist
- Gerald Feehery (born 1960), American football player
- John Feehery (born 1963), American political communications strategist
