= Cole House (cyclist) =

American cyclist (born 1988)

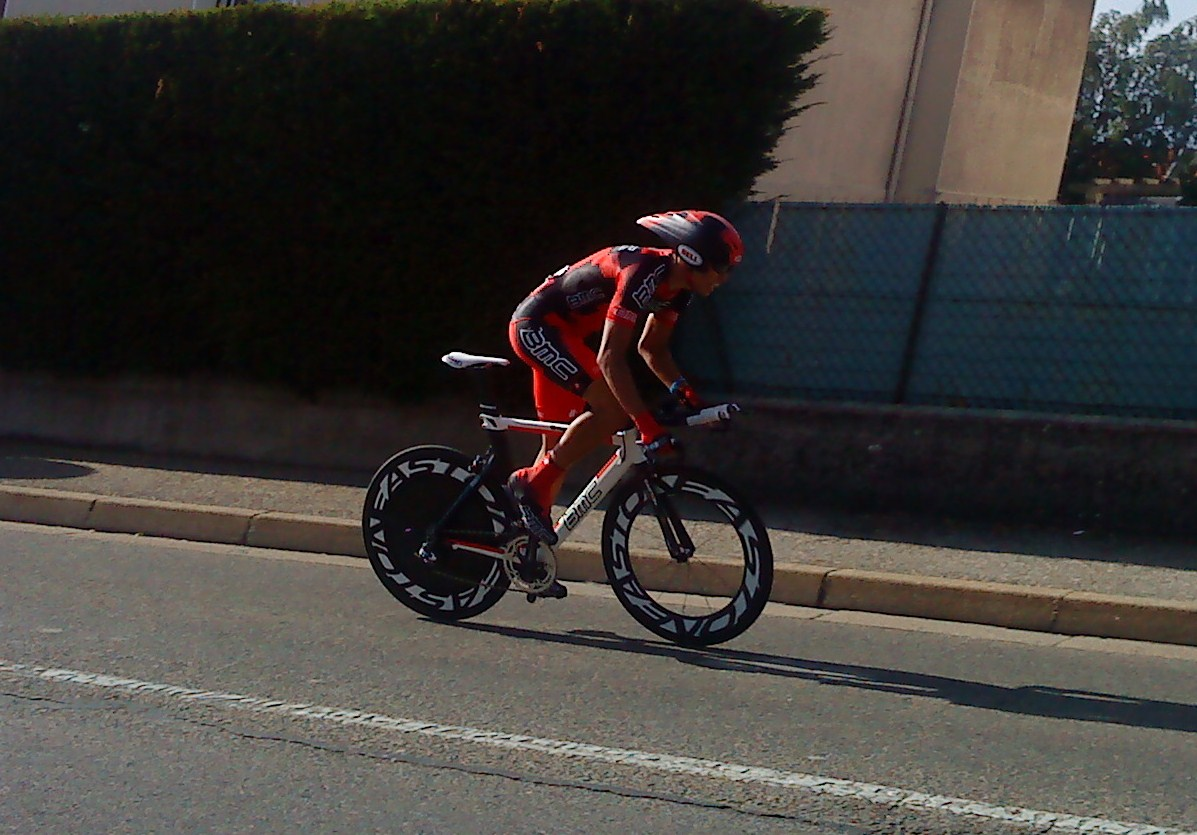

Personal information
- Born: February 5, 1988 (age 38) United States
- Height: 6 ft 2 in (188 cm)
- Weight: 175 lb (79 kg)

Cycling career
- Sport: Cycling
- Discipline: Road
- Role: Rider
- Rider type: Sprinter, classics specialist

Amateur teams
- 2009–2010: BMC Development Team
- 2010: BMC Racing Team (stagiaire)
- 2013: Cash Call Mortgage

Professional team
- 2011–2012: Realcyclist.com Cycling Team

Cole House (born February 5, 1988) is an American cyclist. He originally raced in BMX and mountain biking during his youth before switching to road racing at the age of 18. He is a member of the Oneida Nation of Wisconsin, Wolf Clan: his mother is Oneida and his father is of mixed Oneida, Ojibwe and Belgian descent. He is from Wisconsin.

== Major results ==
2006
1st Stage 5 Tour de l'Abitibi
2008
5th Overall Tour of Belize

1st Stage 3 (TTT)

7th Ronde van Vlaanderen U23
2009
1st GP Waregem
2010
1st Stage 3 Valley of the Sun Stage Race
1st Stage 11 International Cycling Classic
9th Kampioenschap van Vlaanderen
2011
1st Stage 1 Sea Otter Classic
