= 303Project =

Team information
- Registered: United States
- Founded: 2014
- Discipline: Road
- Status: UCI Continental
- Website: Team home page

Team name history
- 2014–: 303Project

303Project is an American UCI Continental cycling team established in 2014. It gained UCI Continental status in 2018.

== Team roster ==
Rider	Date of birth
Tony Baca (USA)	August 28, 1991 (age 35)
Eric Brunner (USA)	1 December 1998 (age 27)
Dillon Caldwell (USA)	25 November 1989 (age 36)
Charles Cassin (USA)	19 July 1991 (age 35)
Maxx Chance (USA)	April 30, 1996 (age 30)
Andrew Clemence (USA)	May 30, 1989 (age 37)
Flavio De Luna (MEX)	26 January 1990 (age 36)
Griffin Easter (USA)	November 6, 1991 (age 34)
Cullen Easter (USA)	October 27, 1987 (age 38)
Grant Ellwood (USA)	11 May 1996 (age 30)

Rider	Date of birth
Bernat Font Mas (ESP)	7 February 1994 (age 32)
Rolando González (CRC)	January 10, 1980 (age 46)
Isaiah Newkirk (USA)	May 12, 1990 (age 36)
Cristhian Ravelo (USA)	September 10, 1992 (age 33)
Jake Silverberg (USA)	May 18, 1996 (age 30)
Austin Stephens (USA)	May 11, 1993 (age 33)
Taylor Warren (USA)	November 24, 1992 (age 33)
Chris Winn (AUS)	March 12, 1984 (age 42)

== Major results ==
2018
Stage 3b Tour de Beauce, Griffin Easter

2019
Stage 4 Tour de Beauce, Griffin Easter
