= Jonny Brown =

Jonny Brown may refer to:

- Jonny Brown (cyclist) (born 1997), American cyclist
- Jonny Brown, British musician, founder of Twisted Wheel
