= Jake Silverberg =

American cyclist

Personal information
- Born: May 18, 1996 (age 30) Pembroke Pines, Florida

Cycling career
- Sport: Cycling
- Current team: Miami Blazers
- Discipline: Road
- Role: Rider

Amateur teams
- 2017: Home Solution–Anmapa–Soenens
- 2022–: Miami Blazers

Professional teams
- 2015–2016: Astellas
- 2017: Start–Vaxes Cycling Team
- 2018–2019: 303Project

Jake Silverberg (born May 18, 1996) is an American professional racing cyclist. He rode in the men's team time trial at the 2015 UCI Road World Championships.

== Major results ==
2014
3rd Time trial, National Junior Road Championships
