= Sean Bennett (cyclist) =

American cyclist (born 1996)

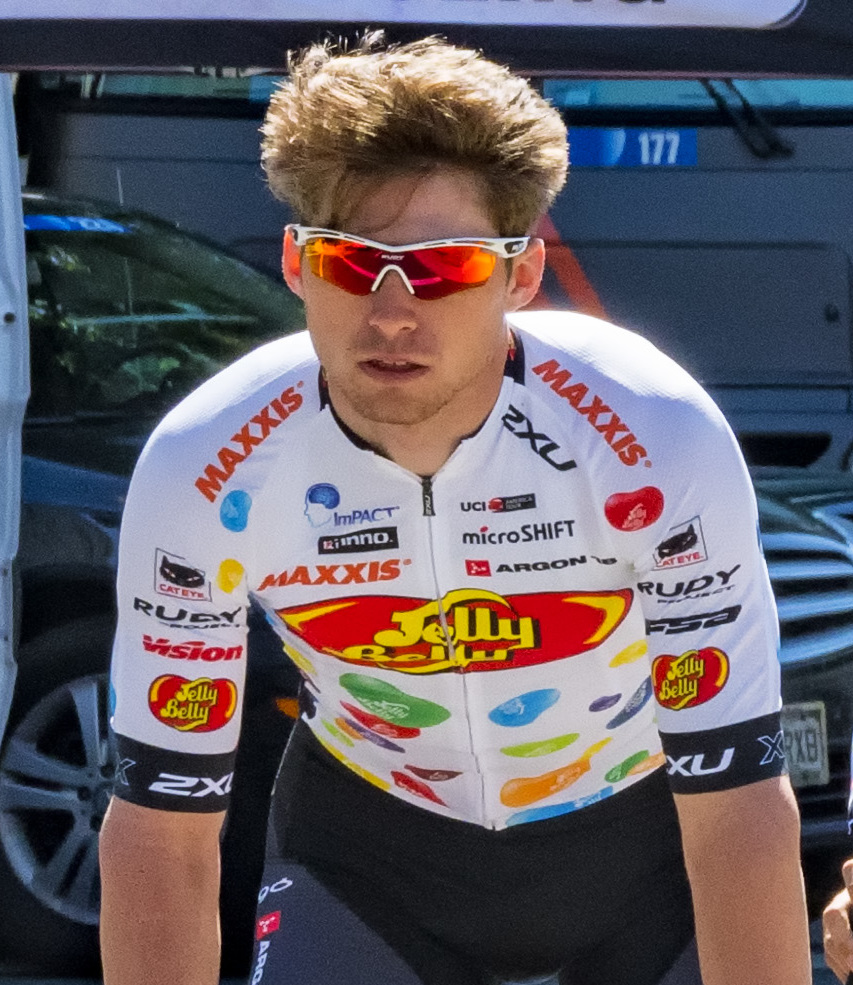
- Bennett in 2017

Personal information
- Full name: Sean Bennett
- Born: March 31, 1996 (age 30) El Cerrito, California
- Height: 5 ft 10 in (178 cm)
- Weight: 146 lb (66 kg)

Cycling career
- Sport: Cycling
- Current team: Retired
- Discipline: Road
- Role: Rider
- Rider type: All-rounder

Amateur team
- 2015: Hagens Berman U23

Professional teams
- 2016: An Post–Chain Reaction
- 2017: Jelly Belly–Maxxis
- 2018: CCB Foundation–Sicleri
- 2018: Hagens Berman Axeon
- 2019–2020: EF Education First
- 2021: Team Qhubeka Assos
- 2022: China Glory Continental Cycling Team

Sean Bennett (born March 31, 1996) is an American former cyclist, who competed as a professional between 2015 and 2022.

== Career ==
In February 2018, Bennett was offered a contract with UCI Professional Continental team Hagens Berman Axeon, following the departure of Adrien Costa from the team. He joined the team on February 5, leaving his previous team, CCB Foundation–Sicleri.

He made his UCI World Tour debut in the 2018 Tour of California, finishing in second on stage 3. In May 2019, he was named in the startlist for the 2019 Giro d'Italia, notably finishing ninth in a sprint finish on the 18th stage. He also entered the race the following year, but did not finish. He also competed in the 2021 Tour de France while riding for Team Qhubeka Assos. However, after the team folded at the end of 2021, he was forced to look for a new team for 2022, having to settle for UCI Continental team China Glory Continental Cycling Team.

He retired at the end of the 2022 season, after being unable to find a team.

== Major results ==
=== Mountain bike ===
2013
2nd Cross-country, National Junior Championships
2014
1st Cross-country, National Junior Championships

=== Road ===
2017
1st Stage 1 Tour Alsace (TTT)
1st Mountains classification, Tour de Bretagne
2018
1st Stage 6 Giro Ciclistico d'Italia
7th Ronde van Vlaanderen Beloften
7th Gent–Wevelgem U23
8th Overall Tour of the Gila

1st Young rider classification

8th Overall Istrian Spring Trophy
9th Raiffeisen Grand Prix
10th Grand Prix de Wallonie
2020
8th La Drôme Classic
2021
10th Trofeo Andratx–Mirador d’Es Colomer
2022
8th Overall Tour of Turkey

=== Grand Tour general classification results timeline ===
| Grand Tour | 2019 | 2020 | 2021 |
|---|---|---|---|
| Giro d'Italia | 106 | DNF | — |
| Tour de France | — | — | 130 |
| Vuelta a España | — | — | — |
