= Joshua Atkins =

New Zealand cyclist

Personal information
- Born: 28 June 1992 (age 34)

Cycling career
- Sport: Cycling
- Role: Rider

Professional team
- 2010–2011: Trek Livestrong U23

Joshua Atkins (born 28 June 1992) is a New Zealand professional racing cyclist who last rode for Trek Livestrong U23. Atkins is the youngest rider to win the Tour of Southland.

== Major results ==
2010
6th Overall Tour of Southland
2011
1st Overall Tour of Southland

1st Stage 5

2nd Overall Tour of Tasmania

1st Stage 1 TTT

1st Le Race
4th National U23 Time Trial Championships
2012
3rd NationalU23 Road Race Championships
2013
3rd Overall Herald Sun Tour
