= Carson Miller (cyclist) =

American cyclist

Personal information
- Full name: Carson Miller
- Born: January 9, 1989 (age 37) Seattle, Washington, United States

Cycling career
- Sport: Cycling
- Discipline: Road
- Role: Rider

Amateur teams
- 2006–2007: Fred Meyer/Lakeside Cycling Team
- 2008–2009: Rubicon–Orbea
- 2010: Veloforma
- 2017–2018: Velobody / Bikesale

Professional teams
- 2011: Jelly Belly–Kenda
- 2012–2016: Jamis–Sutter Home

Carson Miller (born January 9, 1989) is an American racing cyclist, who last rode for American amateur team Velobody / Gerk's. He rode in the men's team time trial at the 2015 UCI Road World Championships.

== Major results ==
2010
10th Coupe des nations Ville Saguenay
2015
10th Road race, National Road Championships
