= Jake Sitler =

American cyclist

Jacob Sitler
Personal information
- Born: June 18, 1989 (age 37) York, Pennsylvania, United States

Cycling career
- Sport: Cycling
- Discipline: Road
- Role: Rider

Amateur team
- 2014: Van Dessel Factory Team

Professional teams
- 2015–2016: Astellas
- 2016–2017: CCB Racing
- 2019: Floyd's Pro Cycling

Jacob Sitler (born June 18, 1989) is an American professional racing cyclist, who last rode for UCI Continental team Floyd's Pro Cycling. He rode in the men's team time trial at the 2015 UCI Road World Championships. He raced the 2022 Mountain bike Marathon World Championships in Haderslev, Denmark.

== Major results ==
2018
1st Stage 1 Sea Otter Classic
