= Tanner Putt =

American bicycle racer

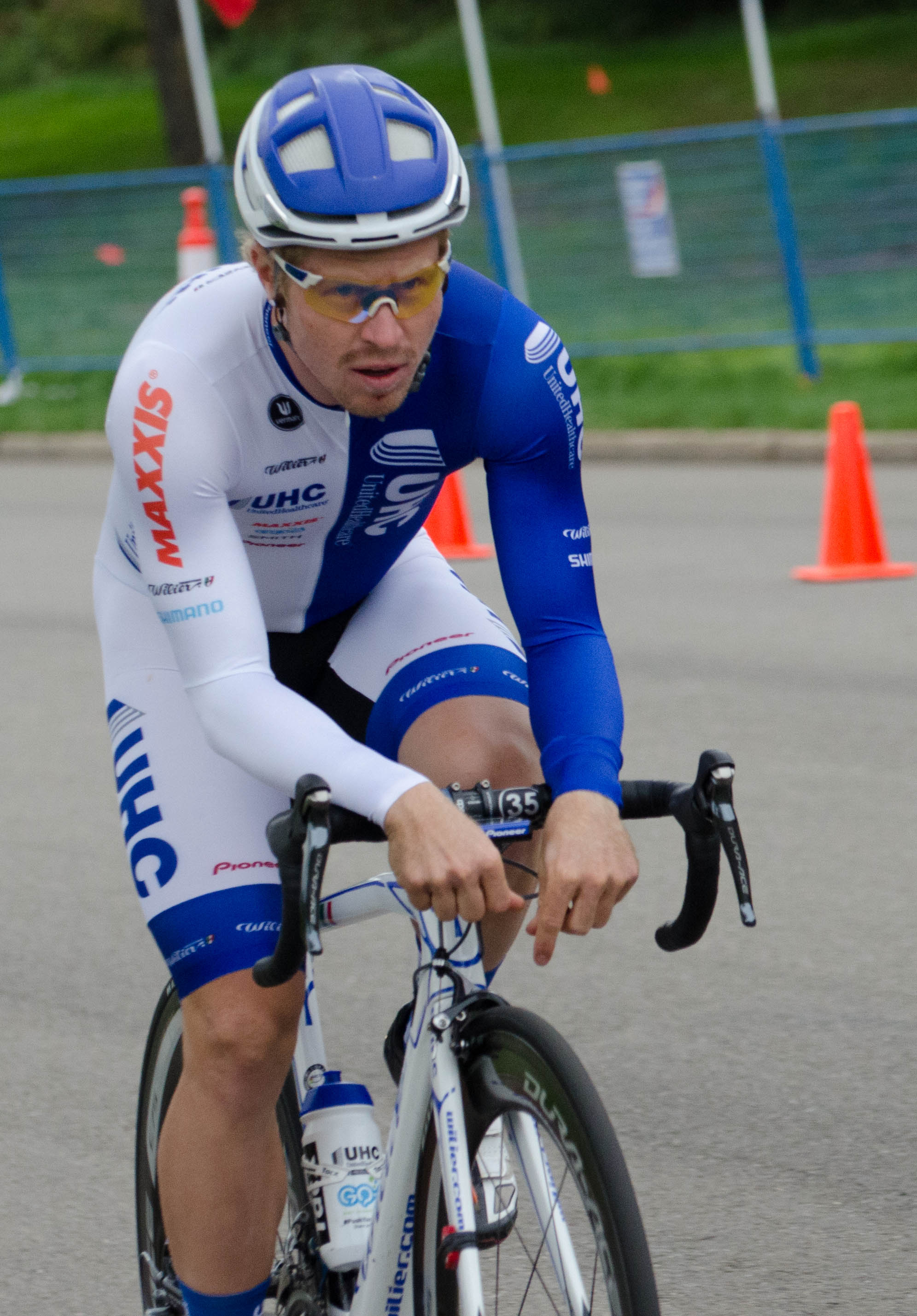
- Putt at the 2016 Tour of Alberta

Personal information
- Full name: Tanner Putt
- Nickname: Polar Bear
- Born: April 21, 1992 (age 34) Park City, Utah, United States
- Height: 1.78 m (5 ft 10 in)
- Weight: 75 kg (165 lb)

Cycling career
- Sport: Cycling
- Current team: Hangar 15 Bicycles
- Discipline: Road
- Role: Rider

Amateur team
- 2020–: Hangar 15 Bicycles

Professional teams
- 2012: BMC–Hincapie Sportswear Team
- 2013–2014: Bontrager Cycling Team
- 2015–2018: UnitedHealthcare
- 2019: Arapahoe Hincapie p/b BMC

Major wins
- U23 National Road Race Championships (2013, 2014)

Tanner Putt (born April 21, 1992) is an American cyclist, who currently rides for American amateur team Hangar 15 Bicycles.

== Major results ==
2009
1st Overall Tour of Belize
2010
2nd Road race, National Junior Road Championships
2012
1st Stage 8a Vuelta a la Independencia Nacional
2nd Road race, National Under-23 Road Championships
10th La Côte Picarde
2013
1st Road race, National Under-23 Road Championships
2014
1st Road race, National Under-23 Road Championships
9th Liège–Bastogne–Liège U23
10th Overall Volta ao Alentejo

1st Young rider classification

2015
7th Ronde van Drenthe
8th Le Samyn
2016
1st Stage 2 Tour of Alberta
2017
8th Overall Tour du Maroc

1st Stage 1

2019
7th Winston-Salem Cycling Classic
