= Griffin Easter =

American cyclist (born 1991)

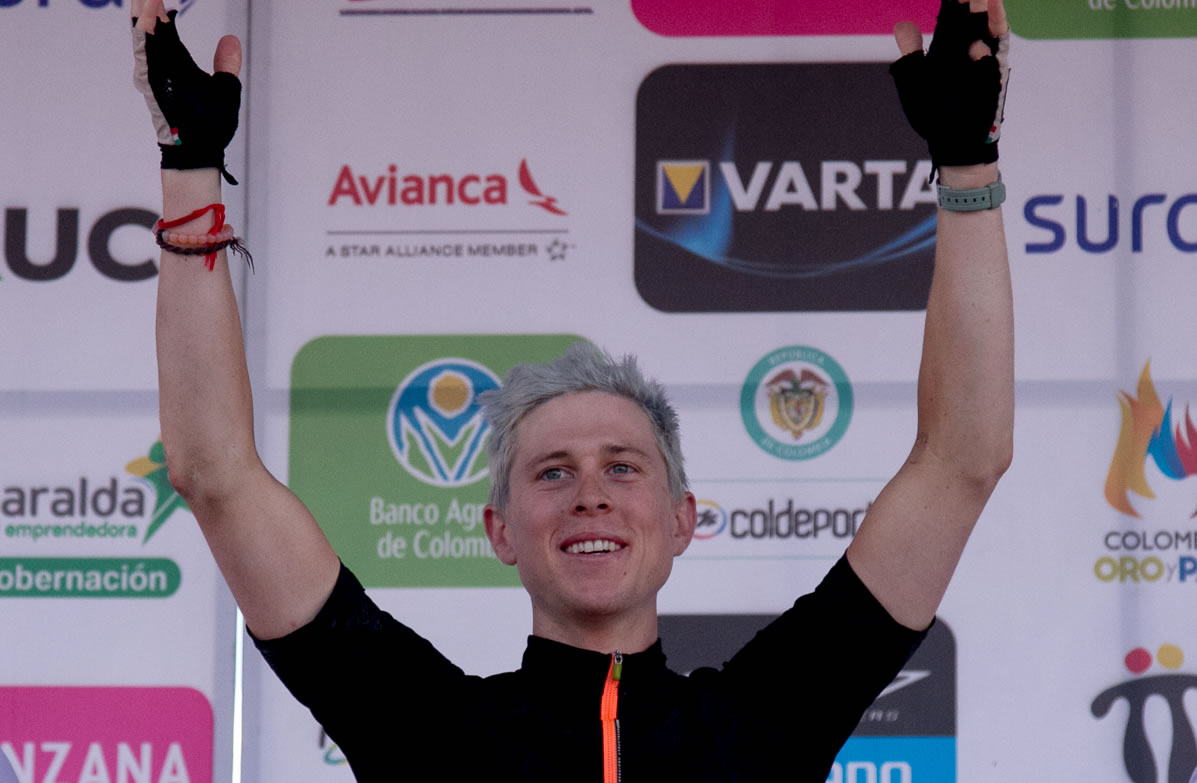
- Easter at the 2017 Vuelta a Colombia

Personal information
- Full name: Griffin Matthew Easter
- Born: November 6, 1991 (age 34) Claremont, California, United States

Cycling career
- Sport: Cycling
- Current team: Start Cycling Team
- Discipline: Road
- Role: Rider
- Rider type: All-rounder

Amateur team
- 2020: Hangar 15 Bicycles

Professional teams
- 2014–2017: Airgas–Safeway
- 2018–2019: 303Project
- 2021–: Start Cycling Team

Griffin Matthew Easter (born November 6, 1991) is an American cyclist, who currently rides for UCI Continental team Start Cycling Team.

== Major results ==
2016
9th Overall Tour d'Azerbaïdjan
2017
1st Stage 6 Vuelta a Colombia
2018
1st Stage 3b Tour de Beauce
2019
1st Stage 4 Tour de Beauce
