= Mac Brennan =

American software engineer and former cyclist

Personal information
- Full name: Mac Brennan
- Born: July 15, 1990 (age 36)

Cycling career
- Sport: Cycling
- Current team: Retired
- Discipline: Road
- Role: Rider

Amateur teams
- 2012: Bissell–ABG–NUVO
- 2014: Bissell–ABG–Giant
- 2018: Bissell–ABG–Giant

Professional teams
- 2012–2013: Bissell
- 2015–2017: Hincapie Racing Team

Mac Brennan (born July 15, 1990) is an American software engineer and former professional racing cyclist. In 2014, Brennan finished fifth at the Bucks County Classic, 57 seconds behind winner Zachary Bell. He rode in the men's team time trial at the 2015 UCI Road World Championships.
