= Gregory Daniel =

American bicycle racer (born 1994)

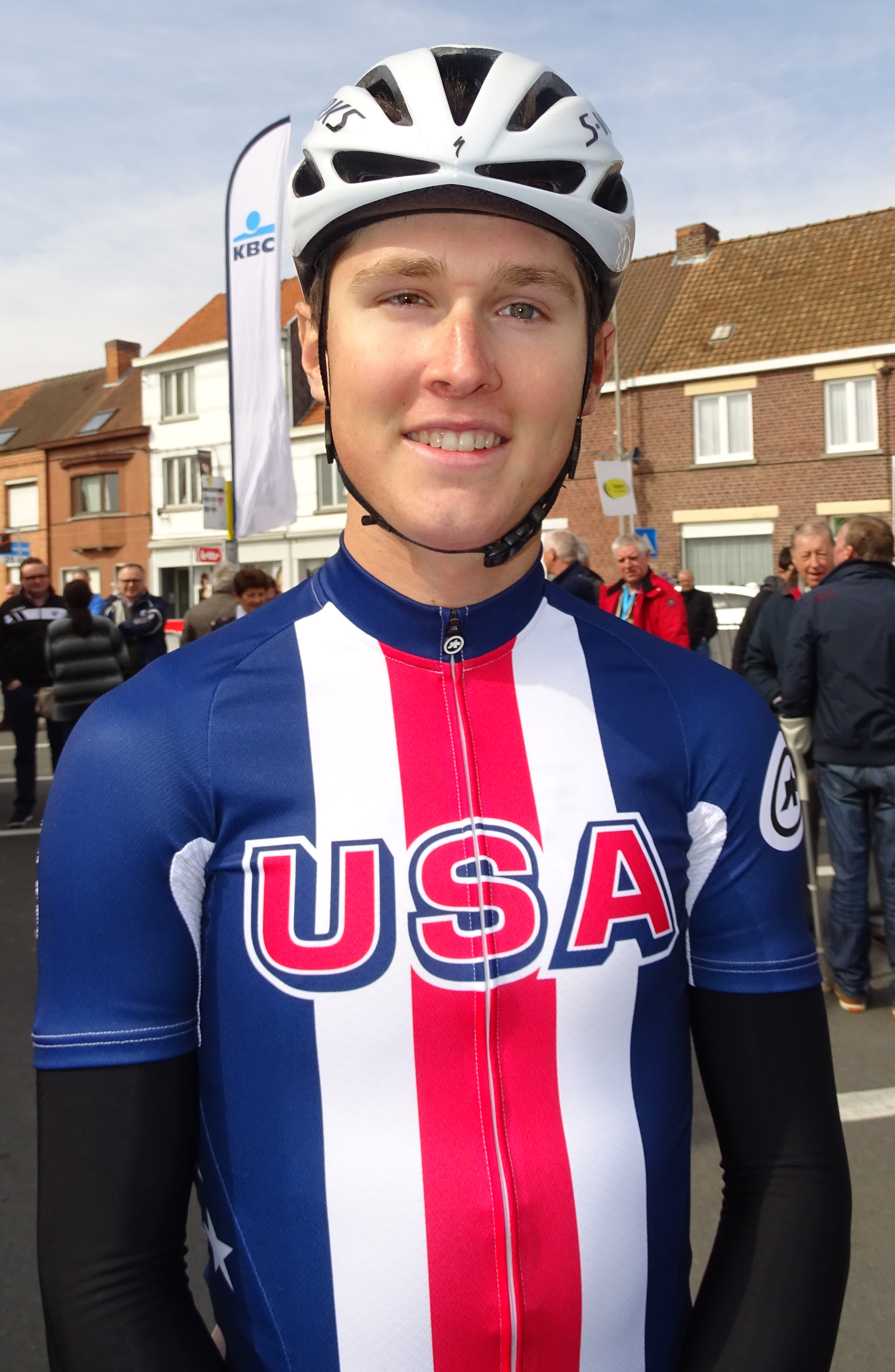
- Daniel in 2016.

Personal information
- Full name: Carl William Gregory Daniel
- Born: November 8, 1994 (age 31) Denver, Colorado
- Height: 1.78 m (5 ft 10 in)
- Weight: 146 lb (66 kg)

Cycling career
- Sport: Cycling
- Discipline: Road
- Role: Rider

Professional teams
- 2013–2016: Bontrager Cycling Team
- 2017–2018: Trek–Segafredo
- 2019: DCBank Pro Cycling Team

Major wins
- One-day races and classics National Road Race Championships (2016)

Gregory Daniel (born November 8, 1994, in Denver) is an American cyclist who last rode for DCBank Pro Cycling Team. He was a member of UCI WorldTeam Trek–Segafredo in 2017 and 2018.

== Major results ==
2011
1st Team pursuit, National Track Championships
2012
1st Time trial, National Junior Road Championships
2013
1st Stage 3 Arden Challenge
2015
1st Mountains classification Tour of Utah
National Under–23 Road Championships

2nd Road race
3rd Time trial

2016
1st Road race, National Road Championships
1st Overall Tour de Beauce

1st Stage 5

1st Stage 1 (TTT) Olympia's Tour
2018
1st Mount Evans Hill Climb
