= Fabio Calabria =

Australian bicycle racer

Personal information
- Full name: Fabio Calabria
- Born: 27 August 1987 (age 39) Canberra, Australia

Cycling career
- Sport: Cycling
- Discipline: Road
- Role: Rider

Amateur teams
- 2014: Horizon Organic–Einstein Bros
- 2016: Novo Nordisk Development

Professional teams
- 2008–2013: Team Type 1
- 2015: Champion System–Stan's NoTubes
- 2017–2019: Team Novo Nordisk

Fabio Calabria (born 27 August 1987 in Canberra) is an Australian cyclist, who last rode for UCI Professional Continental team Team Novo Nordisk. In 2014, Calabria finished eighth at the Bucks County Classic, 57 seconds behind winner Zachary Bell.
