= Max Korus =

American cyclist

Personal information
- Born: October 5, 1988 (age 38) Cleveland, Ohio, United States

Cycling career
- Sport: Cycling
- Current team: Cycling Academy, Israel
- Role: Rider

Max Korus (born October 5, 1988) is an American professional racing cyclist. He rode in the men's team time trial at the 2015 UCI Road World Championships.
