= Daniel Eaton (cyclist) =

American cyclist

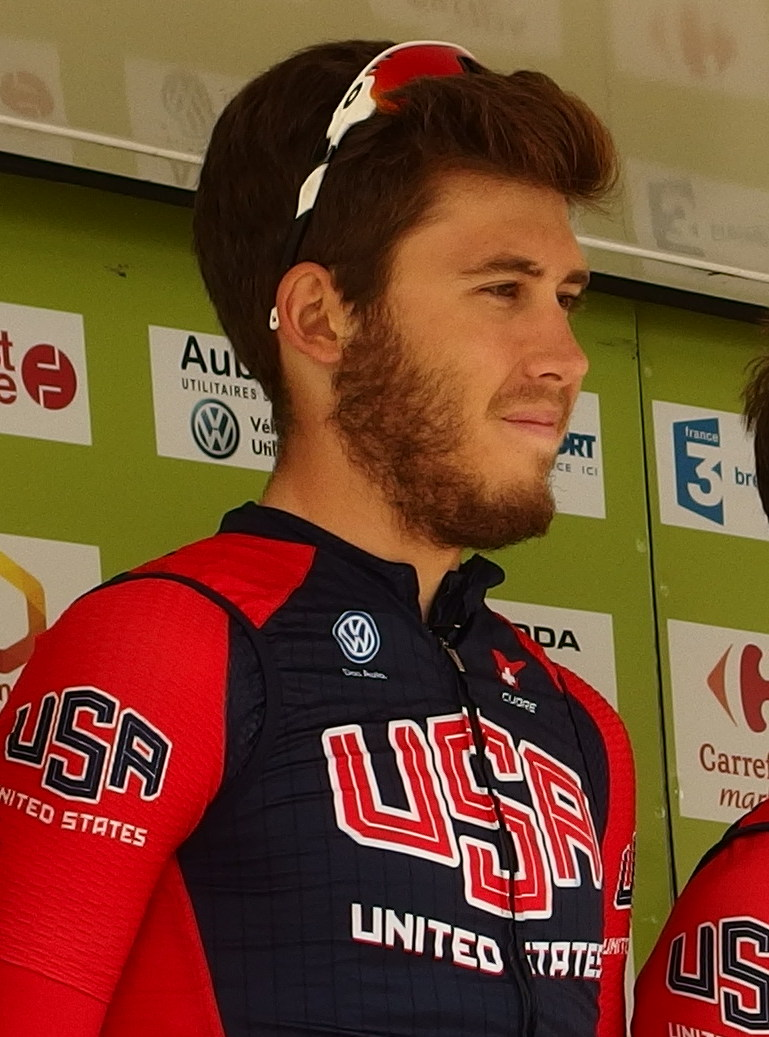
- Eaton in April 2015

Personal information
- Born: July 4, 1993 (age 33) Flagstaff, Arizona, U.S.

Cycling career
- Sport: Cycling
- Current team: Retired
- Discipline: Road
- Role: Rider

Amateur team
- 2014 (until 7/1): Canyon Bicycles-Shimano

Professional teams
- 2014–2015: Bissell Development Team
- 2016–2018: UnitedHealthcare

Daniel Eaton (born July 4, 1993 in Flagstaff, Arizona) is an American former road cyclist.

== Major results ==
2011
7th Overall Grand Prix Rüebliland
10th Overall Tour de l'Abitibi
2014
1st Valley of the Sun Stage Race
3rd San Dimas Stage Race
3rd Arden Challenge
2015
1st Time trial, National Under–23 Road Championships
1st Stage 1 Valley of the Sun Stage Race
10th Time trial, UCI Road World Under–23 Championships
2016
6th Overall Tour of Alberta
2017
4th Overall Cascade Cycling Classic
