= Max Jenkins (cyclist) =

American cyclist (born 1986)

Personal information
- Born: December 5, 1986 (age 39) Novosibirsk, Russia

Cycling career
- Sport: Cycling
- Discipline: Road
- Role: Rider
- Rider type: Climber

Amateur team
- 2018: Davis Bike Club RT

Professional teams
- 2009: Glud & Marstrand–Horsens
- 2010–2011: UnitedHealthcare–Maxxis
- 2012: Competitive Cyclist Racing Team
- 2013: 5-hour Energy
- 2015–2016: Astellas

Max Jenkins (born December 5, 1986) is an American professional racing cyclist.

Born in Novosibirsk, Russia, Jenkins emigrated to the United States when he was eight, and later obtained US citizenship in 2007. His first major result was winning the National under-23 road race championships. He began racing at the age of 15, and attended the University of California, Berkeley prior to turning professional. From 2010 to 2011, he rode for UCI Professional Continental team UnitedHealthcare–Maxxis, notably finishing 11th overall in the 2011 Tour of Utah. The following year, he transferred to the Competitive Cyclist Racing Team team in its second year of existence, notably alongside Francisco Mancebo and Chad Beyer. For the 2013 season, he competed for 5-hour Energy, and rode in the 2013 Tour of California. He rode in the men's team time trial with his team Astellas at the 2015 UCI Road World Championships.

== Major results ==
2007
1st Road race, National Under-23 Road Championships
2009
8th Rogaland GP
2011
4th Nevada City Classic
2012
8th Overall Vuelta Mexico Telmex
2015
2nd Nevada City Classic
