= Darren Rafferty =

Irish cyclist (born 2003)

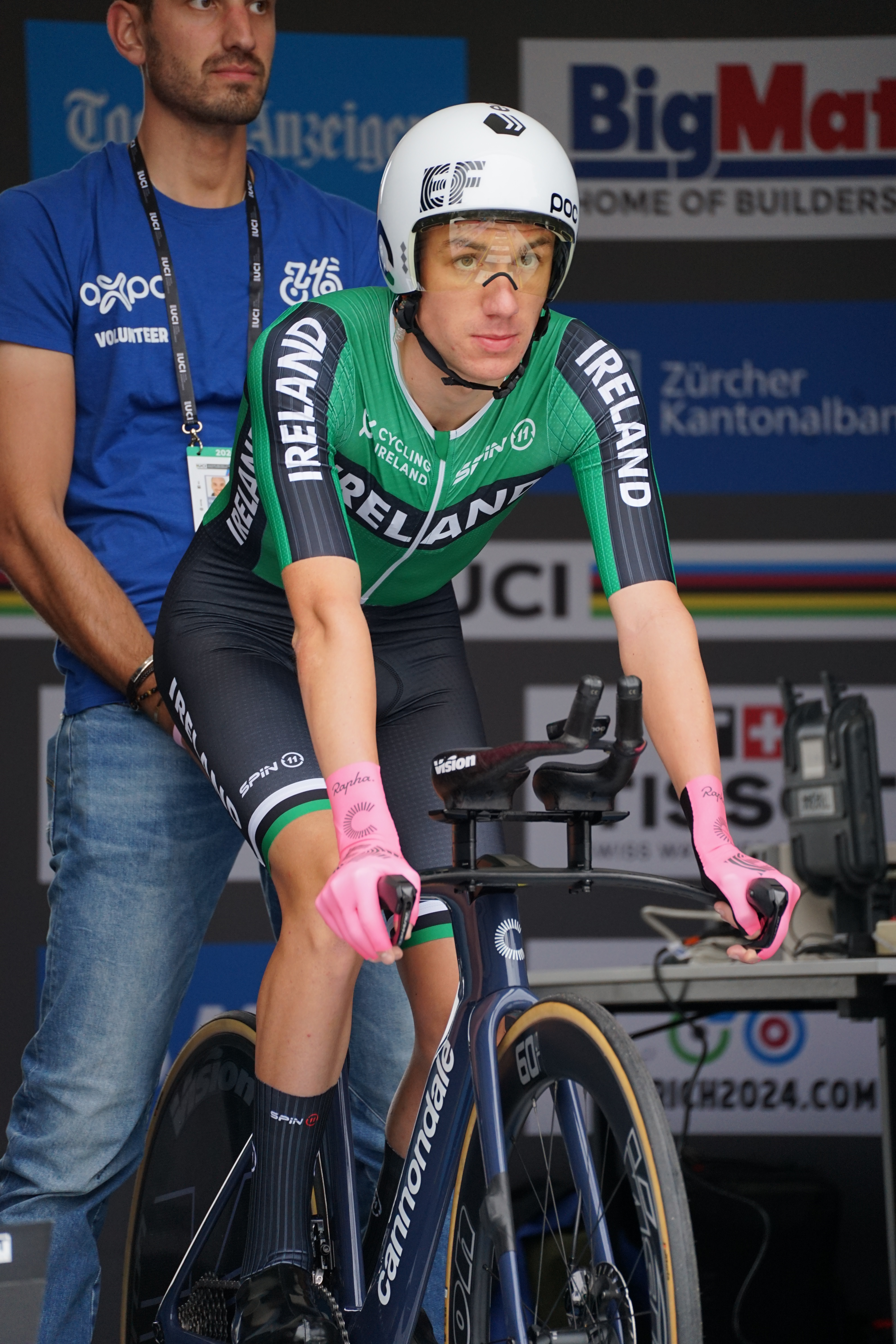
- Rafferty at the 2024 World Road Championships

Personal information
- Born: 1 July 2003 (age 23)
- Height: 1.76 m (5 ft 9 in)
- Weight: 65 kg (143 lb)

Cycling career
- Sport: Cycling
- Current team: EF Education–EasyPost
- Disciplines: Road; Cyclo-cross
- Role: Rider

Professional teams
- 2022–2023: Hagens Berman Axeon
- 2024–: EF Education–EasyPost

Major wins
- One-day races and Classics National Road Race Championships (2024)

Darren Rafferty (born 1 July 2003) is an Irish cyclist who currently rides for UCI WorldTeam EF Education–EasyPost. He was the 2024 Irish National Road Race champion, becoming the first Irish-born winner of the elite men's road race since Damien Shaw in 2015.

== Personal life ==
His brother Adam is also a professional cyclist. He is from Dungannon in County Tyrone.

== Major results ==
=== Cyclo-cross ===
2019–2020
1st National Junior Championships
2022–2023
3rd National Championships

=== Road ===
2020
1st Time trial, National Junior Championships
2021
National Junior Championships

1st Road race
1st Time trial

2nd Chrono des Nations Juniors
4th Time trial, UEC European Junior Championships
2022
1st Time trial, National Under-23 Championships
1st Strade Bianche di Romagna
5th Road race, National Road Championships
6th Time trial, UEC European Under-23 Championships
6th Chrono des Nations Under-23
8th Time trial, Commonwealth Games
2023
1st Time trial, National Under-23 Championships
1st Overall Giro della Valle d'Aosta
2nd Overall Giro Next Gen
5th Time trial, UCI World Under-23 Championships
5th Liège–Bastogne–Liège Espoirs
5th Giro del Belvedere
7th Trofeo Alcide Degasperi
2024 (1 pro win)
National Championships

1st Road race
4th Time trial

6th Time trial, UCI World Under-23 Championships
6th Trofeo Laigueglia
2025
National Championships

3rd Time trial
4th Road race

==== Grand Tour general classification results timeline ====
Grand Tour	2024	2025
Giro d'Italia	—	87
Tour de France	—	—
Vuelta a España	75	

Legend
—	Did not compete
DNF	Did not finish
