= Hagens Berman Jayco =

American cycling team

Team information
- UCI code: HBG
- Registered: United States
- Founded: 2009
- Discipline: Road
- Status: UCI Continental
- Bicycles: Trek (2009–2015); Specialized (2016–2018); Pinarello (2019–2021); BMC (2022–2024); Giant (2025–)

Key personnel
- General manager: Axel Merckx
- Team manager: Jeff Louder

Team name history
- 2009 2010–2011 2012 2013 2014 2015 2016–2017 2018–2023 2024–: Trek Livestrong; Trek Livestrong U23; Bontrager Livestrong; Bontrager; Bissell Development Team; Axeon Cycling Team; Axeon Hagens Berman; Hagens Berman Axeon; Hagens Berman Jayco

Hagens Berman Jayco is a UCI Continental cycling team based in the United States. It was founded in 2009, originally as a feeder team for Team RadioShack. The team initially competed at UCI Continental level before stepping up to UCI Professional Continental status in 2018. It returned to UCI Continental level in 2020. Since 2025 the team serves as a development team for UCI WorldTeam Team Jayco–AlUla.

The squad is managed by 2000 Belgian National Road Race Champion and 2004 Olympic Road Race bronze medallist Axel Merckx and 2008 Tour of Utah winner Jeff Louder.

The team has traditionally focused on developing young riders, with many of its wins coming in under-23 races and junior national championship events. Riders contracted to the team have won the elite men's road race titles in the United States and Ecuador.

Former rider Tao Geoghegan Hart was the 2020 Giro d'Italia champion. Other former members of the team to win Grand Tour stages include Taylor Phinney, Alex Dowsett, George Bennett, Joe Dombrowski, Jasper Stuyven, Jasper Philipsen, Ruben Guerreiro, Ben King, Jhonatan Narváez, João Almeida and Eddie Dunbar.

In April 2017, team rider Chad Young died at the age of 21 from injuries sustained in a crash at the Tour of the Gila. Another tragedy befell the team when 19-year-old Italian rider Samuele Privitera died after a crash on stage 1 of the Giro della Valle d’Aosta in July 2025.

== Team roster ==
As of 3 July 2025.

Rider	Date of birth
Evan Boyle (USA)	June 27, 2004 (age 22)
Fergus Browning (AUS)	December 4, 2003 (age 22)
Matthew Cole (GBR)	January 12, 2005 (age 21)
Wil Holmes (AUS)	February 20, 2006 (age 20)
Carl Emil Just Pedersen (DEN)	January 16, 2006 (age 20)
Jesse Kramer (NED)	October 19, 2003 (age 23)
Hamish McKenzie (AUS)	September 13, 2004 (age 22)
Daniel Filipe Vieira Moreira (POR)	July 2, 2006 (age 20)

Rider	Date of birth
Darren Parham (USA)	April 12, 2005 (age 21)
Samuele Privitera (ITA)	October 4, 2005 (age 21)
Adam Rafferty (IRL)	October 4, 2005 (age 21)
Mattia Sambinello (ITA)	November 3, 2005 (age 21)
Rubén Sánchez (ESP)	January 3, 2006 (age 20)
Gonçalo Tavares (POR)	August 27, 2004 (age 22)
Ben Wiggins (GBR)	March 26, 2005 (age 21)

== Major wins ==
2009
Individual Pursuit, UCI Track Cycling World Cup – Beijing, Taylor Phinney
UCI Track Cycling World Cup – København

Individual Pursuit, Taylor Phinney
1km Time Trial, Taylor Phinney

Individual Pursuit, UCI Track Cycling World Championships, Taylor Phinney
Prologue Flèche du Sud, Taylor Phinney
Paris–Roubaix Espoirs, Taylor Phinney
Stage 1 Tour of Southland, Jesse Sergent
2010
Individual Pursuit, UCI Track Cycling World Championships, Taylor Phinney
Stage 2b U23 Le Triptyque des Monts et Châteaux, Taylor Phinney
Stage 3 Tour of the Gila, Jesse Sergent
Stage 4 Tour of the Gila, Taylor Phinney
Overall Olympia's Tour, Taylor Phinney

Prologue, Stages 1, 2 & 6, Taylor Phinney

Lake Sunapee Criterium, Gavin Mannion
Paris–Roubaix Espoirs, Taylor Phinney
United States National Under-23 Road Race, Ben King
European Under-23 Time Trial, Alex Dowsett
Prologue Cascade Cycling Classic, Jesse Sergent
Stage 5 Cascade Cycling Classic, Alex Dowsett
United States National Road Race, Ben King
Chrono des Herbiers U23, Alex Dowsett
2011
New Zealand National Under-23 Road Race, Michael Vink
Overall New Zealand Cycle Classic, George Bennett
Stage 2a Le Triptyque des Monts et Châteaux, Lawson Craddock
Stage 3 Tour of the Gila, Dale Parker
Stage 4 Tour of the Gila, Joseph Lewis
Stage 2 Highland Rim Classic, Nathan Brown
Overall Tour de Louisiana, Nathan Brown

Stages 1 & 2, Nathan Brown

Prologue Tour de Guadeloupe, Nathan Brown
Stage 8a Tour de Guadeloupe, Lawson Craddock
Stage 5 Giro della Valle d'Aosta, Joe Dombrowski
Nevada City Classic, Ian Boswell
Stage 3 Smith & Nephew/Marx & Bensdorf Gran Prix, Nathan Brown
United States National Under-23 Time Trial, Nathan Brown
John Venturi Memorial, Dale Parker
Stage 5 Giro della Valle d'Aosta, Joe Dombrowski
Stage 2 Hotter 'N Hell Hundred, Lawson Craddock
Stage 1 Tour of Tasmania, Dale Parker & Joshua Atkins
Christchurch–Akaroa, Joshua Atkins
Overall Tour of Southland, Joshua Atkins

Stage 5, Joshua Atkins

2012
Tour de New Braunfels, Gavin Mannion
Under-23 Time Trial, Vlaams-Brabant Provincial Championships, Jasper De Buyst
Under-23 Road Race, Vlaams-Brabant Provincial Championships, Jasper Stuyven
Stage 5 Tour of the Gila, Lawson Craddock
Overall Girobio, Joe Dombrowski

Stages 4 & 8, Joe Dombrowski

Meise–Wolvertem, Jasper De Buyst
Stage 3 Cascade Cycling Classic, Jasper Stuyven
2013
NZL National Under-23 Road Race, James Oram
Nieuwrode Road Race, Jasper Stuyven
Overall Volta ao Alentejo, Jasper Stuyven

Stage 2, Jasper Stuyven

Stage 3 Arden Challenge, Gregory Daniel
Stage 2b Le Triptyque des Monts et Châteaux, Lawson Craddock
Overall Tour de Beauce, Nathan Brown

Stage 1, Jasper Stuyven

Latvia National Under-23 Road Race, Andžs Flaksis
United States National Under-23 Time Trial, Tanner Putt
United States National Under-23 Road Race, Nathan Brown
Overall Tour of Southland, James Oram

Stage 2, James Oram

2014
Stage 5 New Zealand Cycle Classic, James Oram
Overall San Dimas Stage Race, Clément Chevrier

Stage 1, James Oram

Stage 2 Tour of the Gila, Nicolai Brøchner
Walhain Road Race, Nathan Van Hooydonck
United States National Under-23 Road Race, Tanner Putt
Grand Prix Perwez Divertissement, Nathan Van Hooydonck
United States National Track (Team Pursuit), Alexander Darville
United States National Track (Points Race), Alexander Darville
Stage 1 Tour of Alberta, Ruben Zepuntke
2015
New Zealand National Under-23 Time Trial, James Oram
United States National Under-23 Cyclo-cross, Logan Owen
Stage 1 Valley of the Sun Stage Race, Daniel Eaton
Overall GP Liberty Seguros, Ruben Guerreiro

Stage 2, Ruben Guerreiro

Stage 1 Volta ao Alentejo, James Oram
Stages 1 & 2 Iron Horse Classic, Keegan Swirbul
United States National Under-23 Road Race, Keegan Swirbul
United States National Under-23 Time Trial, Daniel Eaton
Stage 3 Tour of Utah, Logan Owen
Lakewood Cyclo-cross I, Logan Owen
Lakewood Cyclo-cross II, Logan Owen
2016
Stage 2 Chico Stage Race, Tyler Williams
Stage 2 Tour of Southern Highlands, Phil O'Donnell
Gran Premio Palio del Recioto, Ruben Guerreiro
Trofeo Banca Popolare di Vicenza, Tao Geoghegan Hart
Stage 3 Redlands Bicycle Classic, Neilson Powless
Liège–Bastogne–Liège U23, Logan Owen
Overall Joe Martin Stage Race, Neilson Powless
Overall Tour de Bretagne, Adrien Costa

Stage 4, Adrien Costa

Stage 7 An Post Rás, Eddie Dunbar
United States Road Race Championships, Gregory Daniel
Overall Tour de Beauce, Gregory Daniel

Stage 3a (ITT), Neilson Powless

Stage 4 (ITT) Tour de Savoie Mont-Blanc, Adrien Costa
Stage 5 Tour de Savoie Mont-Blanc, Tao Geoghegan Hart
Latvia National Under-23 Time Trial, Krists Neilands
Portugal National Under-23 Road Race, Ruben Guerreiro
United States National Under-23 Time Trial, Geoffrey Curran
United States National Under-23 Road Race, Geoffrey Curran
Stage 4 Tour de l'Avenir, Adrien Costa
Stage 2 Hotter 'N Hell Hundred, Jonny Brown
Stage 8 Tour de l'Avenir, Neilson Powless
Stage 1 Tour of Alberta, Colin Joyce
Stage 1 (TTT) Olympia's Tour, Geoffrey Curran, Neilson Powless, Justin Oien, Gregory Daniel, Colin Joyce & Tyler Williams
2017
Stage 2 Clásico Virgen de la Purificación, Jhonatan Narváez
Portugal National Track (Individual Pursuit), Ivo Oliveira
Portugal National Track (Omnium), Ivo Oliveira
Portugal National Track (Points Race), Ivo Oliveira
Stage 4 Volta ao Alentejo, Logan Owen
Stage 3a (ITT) Le Triptyque des Monts et Châteaux, Neilson Powless
Stage 3 San Dimas Stage Race, Michael Rice
Fontana Mountainbike, Christopher Blevins
Tour of Flanders U23, Eddie Dunbar
Overall Circuit des Ardennes, Jhonatan Narváez
GP Arjaan de Schipper, Chris Lawless
Gran Premio Palio del Recioto, Neilson Powless
Stage 5 Tour of the Gila, Jhonatan Narváez
Stage 3 Redlands Bicycle Classic, Michael Rice
Shrewsbury Grand Prix, Chris Lawless
Prologue Grand Prix Priessnitz spa, Ivo Oliveira
Stage 1 Giro Ciclistico d'Italia, Neilson Powless
Stage 3b Tour de Beauce, Chris Lawless
Stage 4 Tour de Beauce, Ian Garrison
Otley Grand Prix, Chris Lawless
United States National Under-23 Road Race, Neilson Powless
Wales Open Criterium, Chris Lawless
United States National Under-23 Mountainbike (XC), Christopher Blevins
Walpole Mountainbike, Christopher Blevins
Póvoa da Galega, Ivo Oliveira
Ecuador National Road Race, Jhonatan Narváez
Los Angeles Under-23 Cyclo-cross I, Christopher Blevins
Los Angeles Under-23 Cyclo-cross II, Christopher Blevins
2018
Portugal National Track (Omnium), Ivo Oliveira
United States National Under-23 Cyclo-cross, Christopher Blevins
Portugal National Track (Scratch Race), João Almeida
Dorpenomloop Rucphen, Mikkel Bjerg
Stage 2 San Dimas Stage Race, Christopher Blevins
Overall Le Triptyque des Monts et Châteaux, Jasper Philipsen

Stages 1 & 2, Jasper Philipsen

Stage 3b Circuit des Ardennes, Ivo Oliveira
Liège–Bastogne–Liège U23, João Almeida
Stage 2 Tour of the Gila, Christopher Blevins
Stage 4 Tour of the Gila, Michael Rice
Overall Redlands Bicycle Classic, Thomas Revard

Stage 1, Thomas Revard

Trofee Maarten Wynants, Jasper Philipsen
Stage 3 Giro Ciclistico d'Italia, Jasper Philipsen
Stage 6 Giro Ciclistico d'Italia, Sean Bennett
Portugal National Under-23 Time Trial, Ivo Oliveira
Portugal National Under-23 Road Race, Rui Oliveira
United States National Road Race, Jonny Brown
Stage 4 Tour of Utah, Jasper Philipsen
Stage 4 Tour de l'Avenir, Mikkel Bjerg
Gylne Gutuer, Jasper Philipsen
Portugal National Track (Madison), Ivo Oliveira
Portugal National Track (Madison), Rui Oliveira
UCI World Under-23 Time Trial Championships, Mikkel Bjerg
Denmark National Track (1km Time Trial), Mikkel Bjerg
Denmark National Track (Individual Pursuit), Mikkel Bjerg
2019
Stage 1 Redlands Bicycle Classic, Sean Quinn
Stage 2 Redlands Bicycle Classic, Kevin Vermaerke
Overall Le Triptyque des Monts et Châteaux, Mikkel Bjerg
United States National Under-23 Time Trial, Ian Garrison
United States National Time Trial, Ian Garrison
Portugal National Under-23 Road Race, João Almeida
Portugal National Under-23 Time Trial, João Almeida
Hafjell GP, Mikkel Bjerg
Chrono Champenois, Mikkel Bjerg
Liège–Bastogne–Liège U23, Kevin Vermaerke
UCI World Under-23 Time Trial Championships, Mikkel Bjerg
Netherlands National Track (Individual Pursuit), Maikel Zijlaard
Netherlands National Track (Team Pursuit), Maikel Zijlaard
2020
Australia National Under-23 Road Race, Jarrad Drizners
Stage 4 Tour of Southern Highlands, Michael Garrison
2021
Clássica da Arrábida, Sean Quinn
Portugal National Under-23 Road Race, Pedro Andrade
United States National Under-23 Time Trial, Michael Garrison
2022
Overall Istrian Spring Trophy, Matthew Riccitello
Strade Bianche di Romagna, Darren Rafferty
Overall Giro d'Italia Giovani Under 23, Leo Hayter

Stages 2 & 3 Leo Hayter

United Kingdom National Under-23 Time Trial, Leo Hayter
Ireland National Under-23 Time Trial, Darren Rafferty
Stage 1 Flanders Tomorrow Tour, Dries De Pooter
2023
Stage 1 Istrian Spring Trophy, Artem Shmidt
Overall Istrian Spring Trophy, António Morgado
Stage 7 Giro Next Gen, Jan Christen
Ireland National Under-23 Time Trial, Darren Rafferty
Portugal National Under-23 Time Trial, António Morgado
Portugal National Under-23 Road Race, Gonçalo Tavares
Overall Giro della Valle d'Aosta, Darren Rafferty
2024
United States National Under-23 Time Trial, Artem Shmidt
Stage 4 Alpes Isère Tour, Alastair Mackellar
Ireland National Under-23 Time Trial, Adam Rafferty
Portugal National Under-23 Time Trial, Gonçalo Tavares
2025
Stage 5 Giro Next Gen, Adam Rafferty
Ireland National Under-23 Time Trial, Adam Rafferty
Portugal National Under-23 Road Race, Daniel Filipe Vieira Moreira

=== World, Continental & National Championships ===
2009
UCI World Track (Individual Pursuit), Taylor Phinney
2010
UCI World Track (Individual Pursuit), Taylor Phinney
USA Under-23 Road Race, Ben King
European Under-23 Time Trial, Alex Dowsett
USA Road Race, Ben King
2011
Under-23 Road Race, Michael Vink
USA Under-23 Time Trial, Nathan Brown
2013
New Zealand Under-23 Road Race, James Oram
Latvia Under-23 Road Race, Andžs Flaksis
USA Under-23 Time Trial, Tanner Putt
USA Under-23 Road Race, Nathan Brown
2014
USA Under-23 Road Race, Tanner Putt
USA Track (Team Pursuit), Alexander Darville
USA Track (Points Race), Alexander Darville
2015
New Zealand Under-23 Time Trial, James Oram
USA Under-23 Cyclo-cross, Logan Owen
USA Under-23 Road Race, Keegan Swirbul
USA Under-23 Under-23 Time Trial, Daniel Eaton
2016
USA Road Race, Gregory Daniel
Latvia Under-23 Time Trial, Krists Neilands
Portugal Under-23 Road Race, Ruben Guerreiro
USA Under-23 Time Trial, Geoffrey Curran
USA Under-23 Road Race, Geoffrey Curran
2017
Portugal Track (Individual Pursuit), Ivo Oliveira
Portugal Track (Omnium), Ivo Oliveira
Portugal Track (Points Race), Ivo Oliveiraira
USA Under-23 Road Race, Neilson Powless
USA Under-23 Mountainbike (XC), Christopher Blevins
Ecuador Road Race, Jhonatan Narváez
2018
Portugal Track (Omnium), Ivo Oliveira
USA Under-23 Cyclo-cross, Christopher Blevins
Portugal Track (Scratch Race), João Almeida
Portugal Under-23 Time Trial, Ivo Oliveira
Portugal Under-23 Road Race, Rui Oliveira
USA Road Race, Jonny Brown
Portugal Track (Madison), Ivo Oliveira
Portugal (Madison), Rui Oliveira
UCI World Under-23 Time Trial, Mikkel Bjerg
Denmark Track (1km Time Trial), Mikkel Bjerg
Denmark Track (Individual Pursuit), Mikkel Bjerg
2019
USA Under-23 Time Trial, Ian Garrison
USA Time Trial, Ian Garrison
Portugal Under-23 Road Race, João Almeida
Portugal Under-23 Time Trial, João Almeida
UCI World Under-23 Time Trial, Mikkel Bjerg
Netherlands Track (Individual Pursuit), Maikel Zijlaard
Netherlands Track (Team Pursuit), Maikel Zijlaard
2020
Australia Under-23 Road Race, Jarrad Drizners
2021
Portugal Under-23 Road Race, Pedro Andrade
USA Under-23 Time Trial, Michael Garrison
2022
Great Britain Under-23 Time Trial, Leo Hayter
Ireland Under-23 Time Trial, Darren Rafferty
2023
Ireland Under-23 Time Trial, Darren Rafferty
Portugal Under-23 Time Trial, António Morgado
Portugal Under-23 Road Race, Gonçalo Tavares
2024
USA Under-23 Time Trial, Artem Shmidt
Ireland Under-23 Time Trial, Adam Rafferty
Portugal Under-23 Time Trial, Gonçalo Tavares
2025
Ireland Under-23 Time Trial, Adam Rafferty
Portugal Under-23 Road Race, Daniel Filipe Vieira Moreira
