= Adam Rafferty (cyclist) =

Cyclist from Northern Ireland (born 2005)

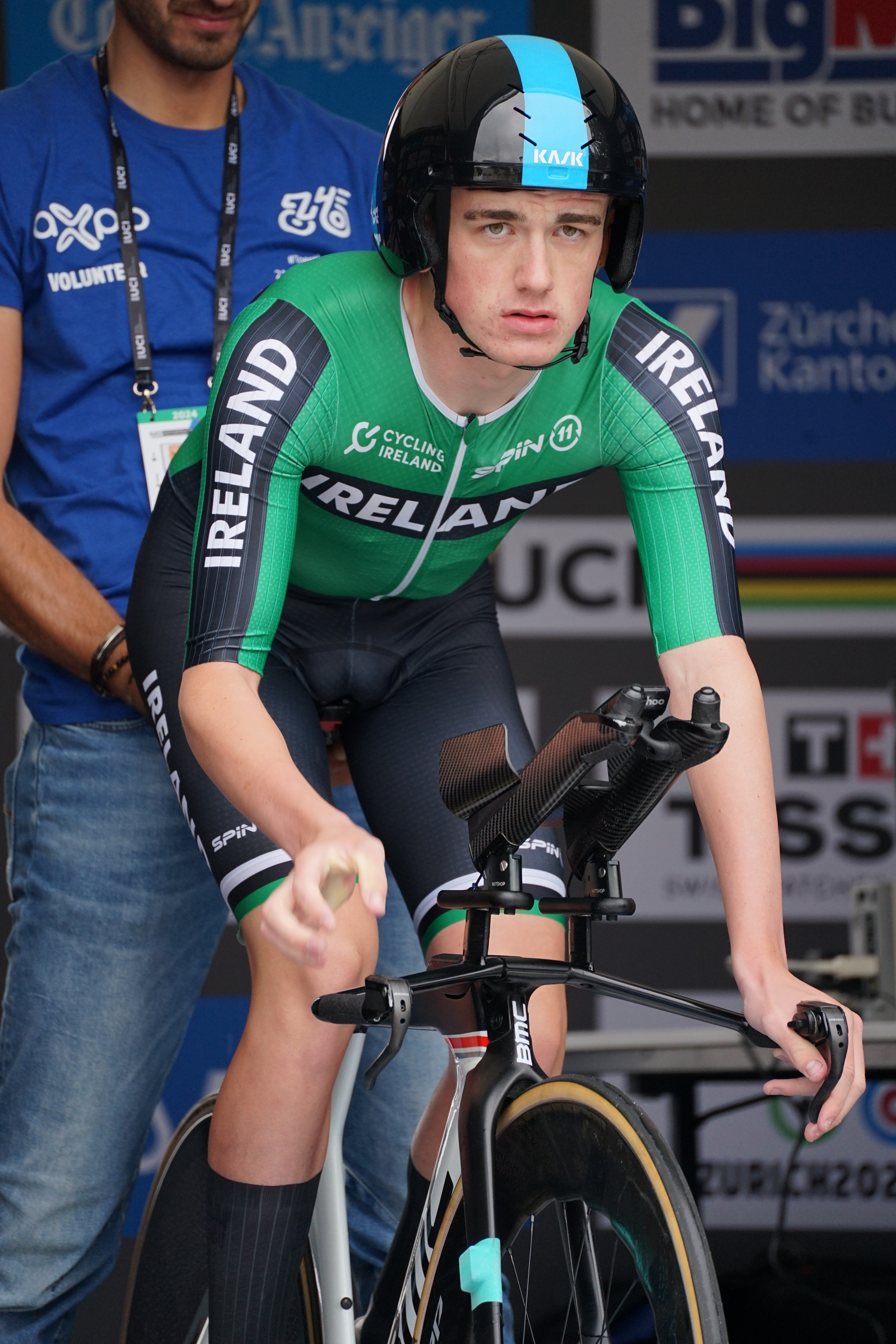
- Rafferty at the 2024 UCI Road World Championships

Personal information
- Born: 4 October 2005 (age 21) Dungannon, County Tyrone, Northern Ireland

Cycling career
- Sport: Cycling
- Current team: Hagens Berman Jayco
- Discipline: Road
- Role: Rider
- Rider type: Time trialist

Amateur team
- 2022–2023: Team 31 Jolly Cycles

Professional team
- 2024–: Hagens Berman Jayco
Medal record
Men's road bicycle racing
Representing Ireland
European Championships
Bronze medal – third place	2025 Guilherand-Granges	Under-23 time trial

Adam Rafferty (born 4 October 2005) is an Irish cyclist who rides for UCI Continental team Hagens Berman Jayco.

== Career ==
In 2022, at the age of 16 years-old he rode in France for the Team 31 Jolly Cycles. He raced for the team again in 2023. In April 2023, he won the Lakeland Grand Prix after a 100 km solo breakaway. He finished in eighth place in the UCI Road World Championships – Junior men's time trial in Glasgow in August 2023.

He signed for Hagens Berman Axeon ahead of the 2024 season. Riding for Ireland, he finished in tenth place at the 2024 UCI Road World Championships in Zurich in the men's under-23 time trial.

Rafferty won the bronze medal riding for Ireland in the U23 time trial at the 2025 European Road Championships. The following year, he placed second in the time trial at the Giro Next Gen, behind only overall race winner Lorenzo Finn, and had a top-ten finish in the U23 time trial at the 2026 World Championships in Montreal.

Ahead of the 2027 season, he signed for UCI WorldTeam Team Jayco-AlUla.

== Personal life ==
From Dungannon in County Tyrone, Northern Ireland, his younger sister Aliyah and older brother Darren are also professional cyclists.

== Major results ==
2022
3rd Time trial, National Junior Road Championships
6th Chrono des Nations Juniors
2023
1st Time trial, National Junior Road Championships
1st Overall Tour Junior Causses-Aigoual-Cévennes

1st Stage 2

1st Tour du Carmausin Ségala
1st Stage 2 Tour du Pays d'Olliergues
3rd Chrono des Nations Juniors
8th Time trial, UCI Junior Road World Championships
9th Overall Tour de Gironde
10th Time trial, UEC European Junior Road Championships
2024
1st Time trial, National Under-23 Road Championships
9th Overall International Tour of Rhodes
10th Time trial, UCI Road World Under-23 Championships
2025
1st Time trial, National Under-23 Road Championships
1st Stage 5 Giro Next Gen
3rd Time trial, UEC European Under-23 Road Championships
5th Overall International Tour of Rhodes
2026
1st Time trial, National Under-23 Road Championships
2nd Overall Grand Prix Jeseníky
2nd Overall Tour of Rhodes
7th Overall Giro Next Gen
9th Overall Tour de Bretagne
10th Time trial, UCI Road World Under-23 Championships
