= Drew Christopher =

American cyclist

Personal information
- Born: September 16, 1984 (age 42)

Cycling career
- Sport: Cycling
- Discipline: Road
- Role: Rider

Amateur teams
- 2016: Primal–Audi Denver Elite
- 2021: Voler Factory Team
- 2021: Primal–Audi Denver Elite

Professional team
- 2014–2015: Champion System–Stan's NoTubes

Drew Christopher (born September 16, 1984) is an American professional racing cyclist. He rode in the men's team time trial at the 2015 UCI Road World Championships.
