= Matthieu Jeannès =

French cyclist

Personal information
- Full name: Matthieu Jeannès
- Born: 14 November 1987 (age 38) Saint-Yvi, France

Cycling career
- Sport: Cycling
- Current team: Team Illuminate
- Discipline: Road
- Role: Rider

Amateur teams
- 2006: VS Scaër
- 2007–2009: BIC 2000
- 2010: Côtes d'Armor
- 2011: BIC 2000
- 2012: VS Scaër
- 2014–2015: Leucémie EC
- 2017: Probikeshop Saint-Étienne Loire
- 2018: Hennebont Cyclisme

Professional teams
- 2015–2016: Lupus Racing Team
- 2018: Probaclac/Devinci
- 2019–: Team Illuminate

Matthieu Jeannès (born 14 November 1987) is a French professional racing cyclist, who currently rides for UCI Continental team Team Illuminate. He rode in the men's team time trial at the 2015 UCI Road World Championships.

== Major results ==
2015
10th The Reading 120
2017
7th Overall Tour of Rwanda
