= Geoffrey Curran (cyclist) =

American cyclist

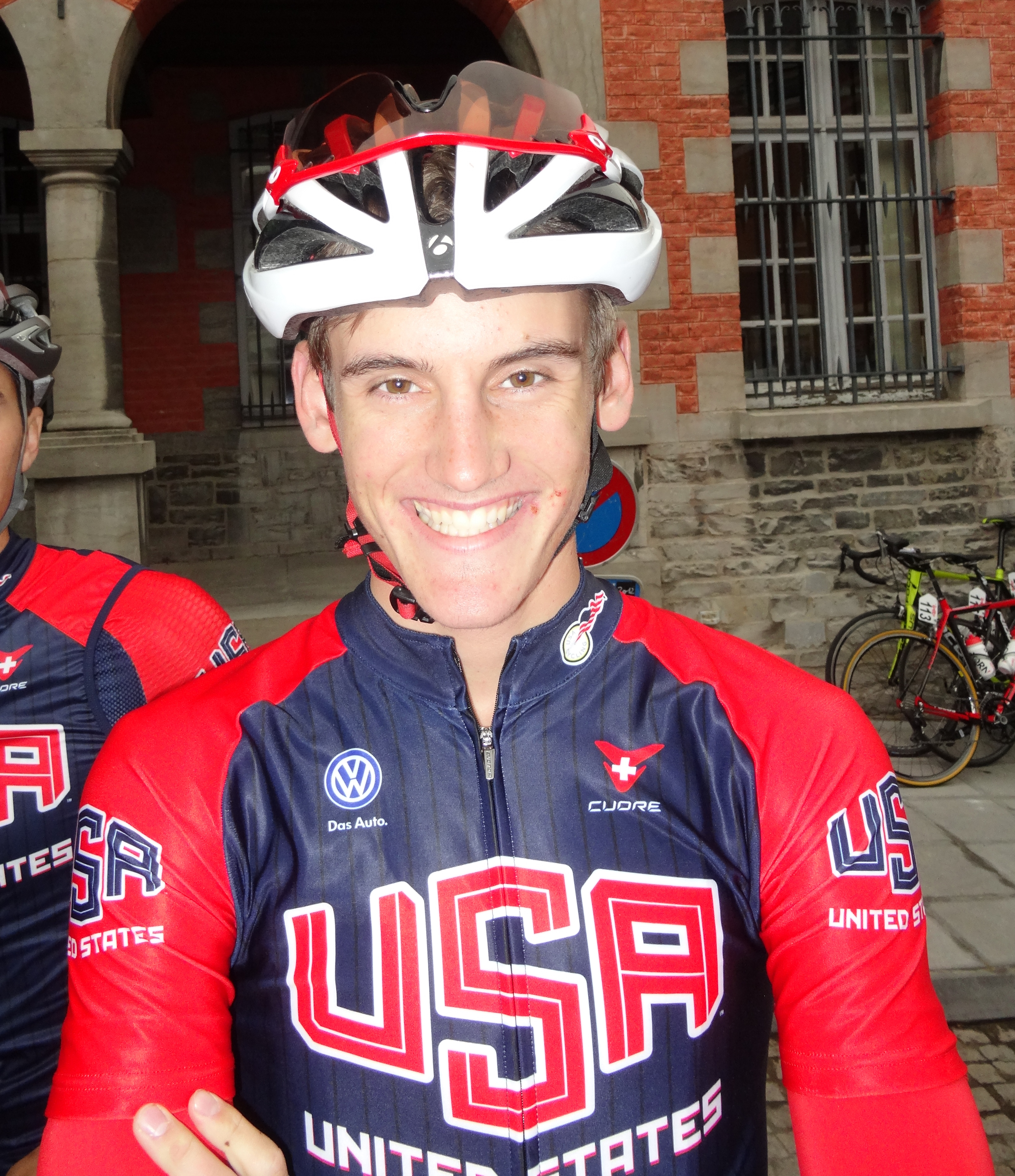
- Curran in 2014.

Personal information
- Full name: Geoffrey Laurence Curran
- Born: October 20, 1995 (age 30) Tustin, California, United States

Cycling career
- Sport: Cycling
- Current team: Retired
- Discipline: Road
- Role: Rider

Amateur teams
- 2010: Sho-Air–Sonance
- 2011–2012: Surf City Cyclery
- 2013: Get Crackin

Professional team
- 2014–2017: Bissell Development Team

Geoffrey Laurence Curran (born October 20, 1995) is an American former professional cyclist, who rode for the Axeon–Hagens Berman team between 2014 and 2017.

== Major results ==
2012
1st Overall International 3-Etappen-Rundfahrt Junioren

1st Young rider classification
1st Stage 1 (ITT)

3rd Overall Tour de l'Abitibi

1st Young rider classification

4th Overall Grand Prix Rüebliland

1st Stage 4

2013
1st Overall Tour du Pays de Vaud

1st Stage 2a

2nd Overall Trofeo Karlsberg
7th Overall Tour de l'Abitibi
2014
1st Young rider classification Le Triptyque des Monts et Châteaux
2015
3rd Giro del Belvedere
2016
National Under-23 Road Championships

1st Road race
1st Time trial

7th Time trial, UCI Under-23 Road World Championships
9th Overall Olympia's Tour

1st Stage 1 (TTT)

9th GP Capodarco
2017
6th Overall Tour de Beauce
