= Competitive Cyclist Racing Team =

Team information
- UCI code: RCC
- Registered: USA
- Founded: 2010
- Disbanded: 2012
- Discipline: Road
- Status: UCI Continental
- Bicycles: Pinarello

Key personnel
- General manager: Jason Kriel, Josh Saint
- Team manager: Gord Fraser

Team name history
- 2011 2012: RealCyclist.com Cycling Team; Competitive Cyclist Racing Team

Competitive Cyclist Racing Team (UCI team code: RCC) was a professional road bicycle racing team based in the United States. The title sponsor, CompetitiveCyclist.com, is an online retailer specializing in premium cycling goods. The team merged with Kenda-5 Hour Energy at the end of 2012.

== Major wins ==
2011
Pro, Age 1–24 San Dimas, Cole House
Overall Redlands Bicycle Classic, Francisco Mancebo

Stage 1, Cole House
Stages 2 & 3, Francisco Mancebo

Overall Tour of the Gila, Francisco Mancebo

Stages 1 & 2, Francisco Mancebo

Overall Cascade Cycling Classic, Francisco Mancebo

Stages 1 & 3, Cesar Grajales
Stage 2, Francisco Mancebo

2012
Stage 1 Rutas de América, Michael Olheiser
Stage 3 Vuelta Mexico Telmex, Thomas Rabou
Tour of the Battenkill, Francisco Mancebo
Stage 1 Tour de Beauce, Francisco Mancebo

== 2012 team ==
As of February 8, 2012.

Rider	Date of birth
Chad Beyer (USA)	August 15, 1986 (aged 25)
Ian Burnett (USA)	December 9, 1986 (aged 25)
Cesar Grajales (COL)	June 5, 1973 (aged 38)
Phil Grenfell (AUS)	April 7, 1989 (aged 22)
Cole House (USA)	February 5, 1988 (aged 24)
Max Jenkins (USA)	January 18, 1985 (aged 27)
Nathan King (USA)	September 3, 1987 (aged 24)

Rider	Date of birth
Francisco Mancebo (ESP)	March 9, 1976 (aged 35)
Tommy Nankervis (AUS)	January 21, 1983 (aged 29)
Michael Olheiser (USA)	January 23, 1975 (aged 37)
Thomas Rabou (NLD)	December 12, 1983 (aged 28)
Taylor Sheldon (USA)	March 31, 1987 (aged 24)
David Williams (USA)	June 19, 1988 (aged 23)
