= Team CCB Foundation–Sicleri =

Team information
- UCI code: CCB
- Registered: United States
- Founded: 1980
- Discipline: Road
- Status: National (1980–2016); UCI Continental (2017–)
- Bicycles: Van Dessel
- Components: Microshift

Team name history
- 1980–2016 2017 2018–: CCB Racing; CCB Velotooler; Team CCB Foundation–Sicleri

Team CCB Foundation–Sicleri is an American UCI Continental cycling team founded in 1980. They are headquartered outside Boston, Massachusetts. The team gained UCI Continental status in 2017.

== Team roster ==
Rider	Date of birth
Sean Bennett (USA)	31 March 1996 (age 30)
Patrick Collins (USA)	4 April 1995 (age 31)
Wyatt Goral (USA)	24 October 1998 (age 27)
Noah Granigan (USA)	18 January 1996 (age 30)
John Harris (USA)	13 August 1993 (age 33)
Thomas Humphreys (DEN)	31 March 1998 (age 28)
Brendan Mccormack (USA)	1 December 1994 (age 31)
Jonah Meadvancort (USA)	3 October 1996 (age 29)
Gabriel Mendez (USA)	27 November 1999 (age 26)
Tim Mitchell (USA)	8 September 1978 (age 47)
Spencer Petrov (USA)	9 September 1998 (age 27)
Jonathan Sandoval (MEX)	21 February 1993 (age 33)
Conor Schunk (USA)	19 June 1999 (age 27)
Roman Seliverstov (UKR)	6 September 1996 (age 30)
Jacob Sitler (USA)	18 June 1989 (age 37)
Cooper Willsey (USA)	18 April 1997 (age 29)
