= Jonny Brown (cyclist) =

American cyclist

Personal information
- Full name: Jonathan Brown
- Born: April 20, 1997 (age 29) Murfreesboro, Tennessee, United States

Cycling career
- Sport: Cycling
- Current team: EvoPro Racing
- Discipline: Road
- Role: Rider

Professional teams
- 2016–2019: Axeon–Hagens Berman
- 2020: Team Skyline
- 2020–: EvoPro Racing

Major wins
- One-day races and Classics National Road Race Championships (2018)

Jonathan Brown (born April 20, 1997) is an American racing cyclist, who currently rides for UCI Continental team EvoPro Racing. In 2018 he won the United States National Road Race Championships. He is the younger brother of Nathan Brown, who is also a cyclist.

== Major results ==
2014
1st Road race, National Junior Road Championships
2015
1st Road race, National Junior Road Championships
2018
1st Road race, National Road Championships
7th Paris–Roubaix Espoirs
2022
7th Overall Joe Martin Stage Race
