= Conor Mullervy =

American cyclist (born 1988)

Personal information
- Born: April 8, 1988 (age 38)

Cycling career
- Sport: Cycling
- Current team: Team Clif Bar Cycling
- Discipline: Road
- Role: Rider

Amateur teams
- 2016: GPM Stulz
- 2017–: Team Clif Bar Cycling

Professional teams
- 2011–2012: Team Exergy
- 2014–2015: Champion System–Stan's NoTubes

Conor Mullervy (born April 8, 1988) is an American professional racing cyclist. He rode in the men's team time trial at the 2015 UCI Road World Championships.

== Major results ==
2013
6th Tobago Cycling Classic

2017
4th Pro Crit Nats

== Personal life ==
Mullervy has an identical twin brother, Kevin, who is also a cyclist.
