= Taylor Shelden =

American cyclist

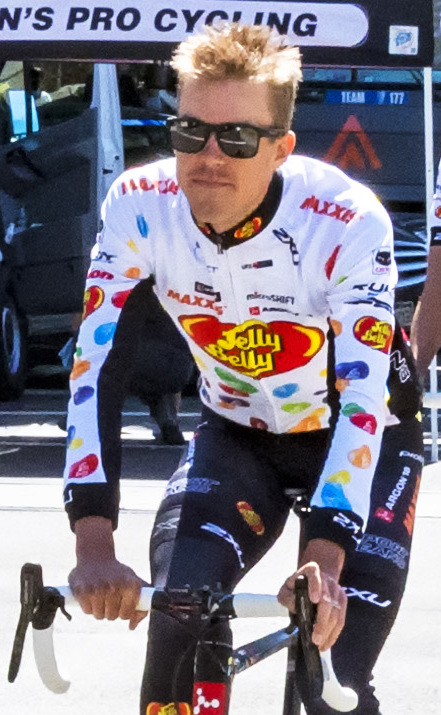
- Shelden in Amgen Tour of California 2017

Personal information
- Full name: Taylor Shelden
- Born: March 31, 1987 (age 39)

Cycling career
- Sport: Cycling
- Discipline: Road
- Role: Rider

Professional teams
- 2012: Competitive Cyclist Racing Team
- 2013–2014: 5-hour Energy
- 2015–2018: Jelly Belly–Maxxis

Taylor Shelden (born March 31, 1987) is an American professional racing cyclist, who last rode for UCI Continental team Jelly Belly–Maxxis. He rode in the men's team time trial at the 2015 UCI Road World Championships.
