= Samuele Privitera =

Italian cyclist (2005–2025)

Personal information
- Born: 4 October 2005 Imperia, Italy
- Died: 16 July 2025 (aged 19) Aosta, Italy

Cycling career
- Sport: Cycling
- Discipline: Road
- Role: Rider
- Rider type: Climber

Amateur team
- 2022–2023: Team F.lli Giorgi ASD

Professional team
- 2024–2025: Hagens Berman Axeon

Samuele Privitera (4 October 2005 – 16 July 2025) was an Italian road cyclist. He competed in the under-23 category and rode for the UCI Continental development team Hagens Berman Jayco.

== Early life and career ==
Privitera was born in Imperia, Italy on 4 October 2005. He began cycling competitively at a young age and progressed quickly through the junior ranks. By 2024, he had joined the development squad of Hagens Berman Jayco, a feeder team for UCI WorldTeam Team Jayco–AlUla.

Privitera achieved notable results in the under-23 circuit, including a top-three finish in a stage of the 2024 Giro Next Gen, and participation in professional-level races such as the Settimana Internazionale di Coppi e Bartali with his development team.

== Death ==
On 15 July 2025, during the first stage of the Giro della Valle d'Aosta, Privitera crashed while descending at high speed (approximately 70 km/h) in the town of Pontey, in the Aosta Valley. According to the Norwegian tabloid newspaper Verdens Gang, he struck a bump or road irregularity, lost his helmet, and crashed into a metal fence. He suffered severe head trauma and went into cardiac arrest.

He was resuscitated on-site and transferred to Umberto Parini Hospital in Aosta, where he died the following day, 16 July 2025, at the age of 19.

== Major results ==
2022
5th Overall Giro della Lunigiana
8th Trofeo Buffoni
2023
1st Coppa 1 Maggio
3rd Trofeo Buffoni
3rd Gran Premio Sportivi di Loria
4th Road race, National Junior Road Championships
6th Trofeo Emilio Paganessi
