= Charles Cassin =

American racing cyclist

Mac Cassin
Personal information
- Born: July 19, 1991 (age 35)

Cycling career
- Sport: Cycling
- Discipline: Track
- Rider type: Pursuiter

Major wins
- 2015 Glencoe Grand Prix 2017 Points Race

Mac Cassin (born July 19, 1991) is a former national champion racing cyclist from the United States.

While attending the University of Colorado Boulder he won 5 Collegiate National Titles on the track between 2011 and 2015 (3 Individual Pursuit, 1 Points Race, 1 Omnium).

After taking a solo win at the Glencoe Grand Prix in 2015 he was offered a spot on Champion Systems p/b Stan's No Tubes to ride the men's team time trial at the 2015 UCI Road World Championships.

After undergoing back surgery in March 2016 he was named to the US National Team for the 2016 Pan American Track Cycling Championships where he competed in the Individual Pursuit and Points Race.

In 2017, Cassin was crowned the US National Points Race Champion after placing second in both the Team Pursuit and Individual Pursuit.

== Major results ==
2014
10th - Stage 1 Vuelta a Guatemala - UCI 2.2
2015
1st - Glencoe Grand Prix - NCC
4th - Stage 3 Redlands Bicycle Classic - NRC
2016
2nd Team Pursuit
3rd Individual Pursuit
2017
Points Race
2nd Team Pursuit
2nd Individual Pursuit
