= Michael Olheiser =

Personal information
- Born: January 23, 1975 (age 51) Forest Lake, Minnesota, U.S.
- Height: 5 ft 10 in (178 cm)
- Weight: 167 lb (76 kg)

Cycling career
- Sport: Cycling
- Current team: Retired
- Discipline: Road
- Role: Rider

Amateur team
- 2013: CashCall Mortgage

Professional teams
- 2012: Competitive Cyclist Racing Team
- 2014: InCycle-Predator Components
- 2015–2016: Lupus Racing Team

Michael Olheiser (born January 23, 1975, in Forest Lake, Minnesota) is an American former professional road racing cyclist.

== Major results ==
- 2006 Masters Road Race National Champion (30-34)
- 2006 Rouge Roubaix winner
- 2006 UCI Masters Time Trial World Champion (30-34)
- 2007 UCI Masters Time Trial World Champion (30-34)
- 2007 Rouge Roubaix winner 2008 Elite Time Trial National Champion
- 2008 Masters Criterium National Champion (30-34)
- 2008 Masters Time Trial Champion (30-34)
- 2008 KOM Tour of Belize 2008 Tour of Belize Stage 5 1st Place
- 2009 UCI Masters Time Trial World Champion (35-39)
- 2009 Tour of Southland Stage 8 1st Place
- 2009 Elite Time Trial National Champion
- 2009 Elite Elite Road Race National Champion
- 2009 Masters Criterium National Champion (30-34)
- 2009 Masters Time Trial National Champion (30-34)
- 2009 Mt. Hood Cycling Classic Prologue Stage Winner
- 2010 Elite Time Trial National Champion
- 2010 Elite Road Race National Champion
- 2010 Masters Time Trial National Champion (35-39)
- 2010 Masters Road Race National Champion (35-39)
- 2011 Mt. Hood Cycling Classic Stage 3 1st Place
- 2011 Masters Criterium National Champion (35-39)
- 2011 Masters Time Trial National Champion (35-39)
- 2012 Nature Valley Gran Prix KOM 2012 UCI Rutas de America Stage 1 1st Place
- 2012 UCI Rutas de America KOM 2013 Masters Time Trial National Champion (35-39)
- 2014 USPRO Time Trial 5th Place
- 2015 USPRO Time Trial 5th Place
- 2016 UCI Vuelta Indipendencia Nacional Republica Dominicana Stage 7 1st Pla
