= Gonçalo Tavares =

Portuguese footballer

Personal information
- Full name: Gonçalo Alexandre Glórias Tavares
- Date of birth: 16 May 1997 (age 29)
- Place of birth: Odivelas, Portugal
- Height: 1.81 m (5 ft 11 1/2 in)
- Position: Right-back

Team information
- Current team: Santarém
- Number: 2

Youth career
- 2005–2008: Odivelas
- 2009–2014: Sporting
- 2014–2016: Belenenses

Senior career*
Years	Team	Apps	(Gls)
2016–2018	Belenenses	0	(0)
2016–2017	→ Real (loan)	3	(0)
2017–2018	→ Oriental (loan)	26	(1)
2018–2020	Belenenses SAD	1	(0)
2019–2020	→ Recreativo Granada (loan)	7	(0)
2020–2021	Cova da Piedade	9	(0)
2021–	Santarém	48	(0)
- * Club domestic league appearances and goals as of 17:16, 8 April 2023 (UTC)

Gonçalo Alexandre Glórias Tavares (born 16 May 1997) is a Portuguese professional footballer who plays for Santarém as a right-back.

== Club career ==
On 28 December 2018, Tavares made his professional debut with Belenenses in a 2018–19 Taça da Liga match against FC Porto.

On 2 September 2019 he joined Spanish club Recreativo Granada on a season-long loan with an option to purchase. However, he returned to Portugal at the end of the season and signed with Cova da Piedade in October 2020. Santarém. Ahead of the 2021-22 season, he signed for Santarém.
