= Nathan Brown (cyclist) =

American cyclist

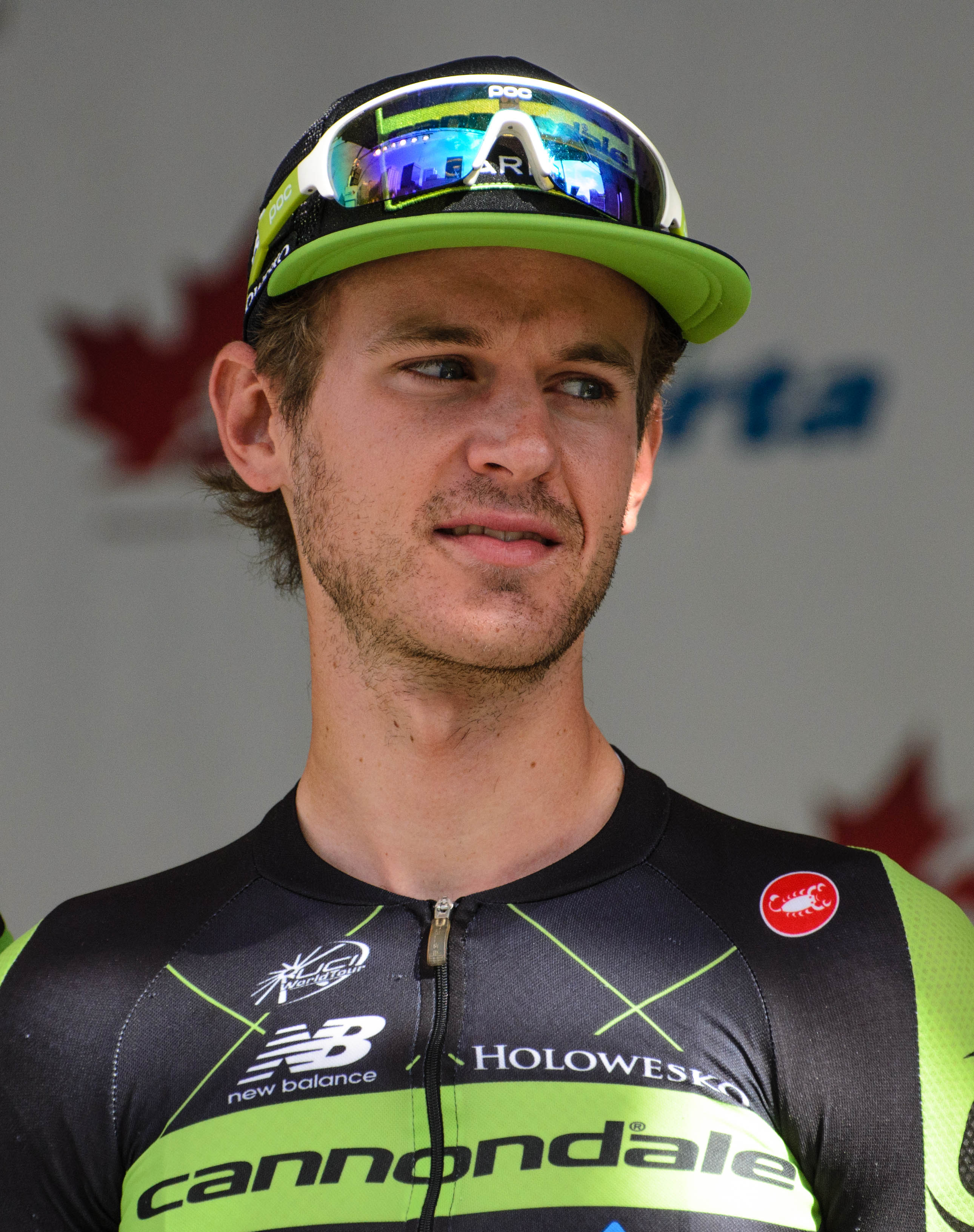
- Brown at the 2015 Tour of Alberta

Personal information
- Full name: Nathan Brown
- Nickname: Downtown Nate Brown
- Born: July 7, 1991 (age 35) Colorado Springs, Colorado, United States
- Height: 180 cm (5 ft 11 in)
- Weight: 67 kg (148 lb)

Cycling career
- Sport: Cycling
- Current team: Retired
- Discipline: Road
- Role: Rider
- Rider type: All-rounder

Amateur teams
- 2002–2003: VeloClips–Sun&Ski
- 2004–2006: SyMed–MOAB
- 2007: Juris–MorePartnersIncome.com
- 2007–2009: Hot Tubes Cycling

Professional teams
- 2010–2013: Trek–Livestrong
- 2014–2019: Garmin–Sharp
- 2020–2022: Rally Cycling

Nathan "Nate" Brown (born July 7, 1991) is an American former professional road racing cyclist. A professional from 2010 to 2022, Brown competed for the Bontrager Cycling Team, Garmin–Sharp and Rally Cycling.

== Biography ==
Brown was born on July 7, 1991, in Colorado Springs, Colorado, United States, but spent his adolescence in Covington, Tennessee, United States. Brown divides his time between Austin, Texas, United States and Girona, Catalonia, Spain.

Brown competed with Trek–Livestrong, a UCI Continental team, for the 2010, 2011, 2012, and 2013 seasons.

In August 2013, Brown signed with Garmin–Sharp, a UCI ProTeam, for the 2014 and 2015 seasons. He remained with the squad for the 2016 season. In June 2017, he was named in the start list for the 2017 Tour de France, making Brown the first Tennessean to compete in the Tour de France.

== Major results ==
2006
2nd Road race, National Junior Road Championships
2008
1st Overall Coupe des Nations Abitibi

1st Stage 3 (ITT)

2009
5th Overall Trofeo Karlsberg
2010
4th Time trial, National Under-23 Road Championships
7th La Côte Picarde
2011
1st Time trial, National Under-23 Road Championships
1st Prologue Tour de Guadeloupe
7th Overall Coupe des nations Ville Saguenay
2012
3rd Time trial, National Under-23 Road Championships
4th Time trial, Pan American Road Championships
9th Chrono Champenois
2013
National Under-23 Road Championships

1st Time trial
2nd Road race

1st Overall Tour de Beauce

1st Points classification

2nd Liège–Bastogne–Liège Espoirs
3rd Time trial, National Road Championships
9th Overall Coupe des nations Ville Saguenay
2017
Tour de France

Held after Stages 3–4

2019
1st Stage 1 (TTT) Tour Colombia

=== Grand Tour general classification results timeline ===
Grand Tour	2014	2015	2016	2017	2018	2019
Giro d'Italia	—	67	48	—	52	67
Tour de France	—	—	—	43	—	—
Vuelta a España	85	—	—	—	—	—

Legend
—	Did not compete
DSQ	Disqualified
DNF	Did not finish
