= Michael Stone (cyclist) =

American cyclist

Personal information
- Born: February 21, 1991 (age 35) Atlanta, Georgia, United States
- Height: 5 ft 11 in (180 cm)
- Weight: 140 lb (64 kg)

Cycling career
- Sport: Cycling
- Role: Rider
- Rider type: all around

Michael Stone (born February 21, 1991) is an American professional racing cyclist. He rode in the men's team time trial at the 2015 UCI Road World Championships.
