= Bohemia Cycling Track Team =

Team information
- Registered: Czech Republic
- Founded: 2015
- Discipline: Road
- Status: UCI Continental

Team name history
- 2015–: Bohemia Cycling Track Team

Bohemia Cycling Track Team is a Czech UCI Continental cycling team established in 2015.
