= Lupus Racing Team =

Team information
- UCI code: LRT
- Registered: United States
- Founded: 2014
- Disbanded: 2016
- Discipline: Road
- Status: Domestic (2014); UCI Continental (2015–2016)
- Bicycles: Eddy Merckx Cycles

Key personnel
- General manager: Brenden Sullivan
- Team manager: Steve Carpenter

Team name history
- 2014–2016: Lupus Racing Team

Lupus Racing Team was an American UCI Continental cycling team established in 2014. LRT was dedicated to raising awareness and funding in search of a cure for this autoimmune disease. In late 2016, it was announced that the team was closing.

== Team roster ==
As of Feb 15, 2016.

Rider	Date of birth
Chad Beyer (USA)	August 15, 1986 (age 40)
Winston David (USA)	October 11, 1987 (age 38)
Oliver Flautt (USA)	May 28, 1993 (age 33)
Chris Horner (USA)	October 23, 1971 (age 54)
Matthieu Jeannès (FRA)	November 14, 1987 (age 38)
Marcos Lazzarotto (BRA)	November 3, 1990 (age 35)
Bryan Lewis (USA)	August 31, 1990 (age 36)
Jonah Mead-Vancourt (FRA)	October 2, 1996 (age 29)

Rider	Date of birth
Barry Miller (USA)	December 5, 1988 (age 37)
Evan Murphy (USA)	March 25, 1988 (age 38)
Michael Olheiser (USA)	January 23, 1975 (age 51)
Michael Stone (USA)	February 21, 1991 (age 35)
Nicolae Tanovițchii (MDA)	December 23, 1993 (age 32)
Nolan Tankersley (USA)	March 6, 1995 (age 31)
Thomas Vaubourzeix (FRA)	June 16, 1989 (age 37)

== Major wins ==
2016
Stage 7 Vuelta Independencia Nacional Republica Dominicana, Michael Olheiser
Challenge du Prince - Trophée Princier, Thomas Vaubourzeix
Stage 3 Tour de Tunisie, Thomas Vaubourzeix
Stage 2 Grand Prix Cycliste de Saguenay, Bryan Lewis
