= China Cooperation Development Cycling Team =

Team information
- Registered: China
- Founded: 2015
- Discipline: Road
- Status: UCI Continental

Team name history
- 2015–: China Cooperation Development Cycling Team

China Cooperation Development Cycling Team is a Chinese UCI Continental cycling team established in 2015.
