= Tour of Belize =

Race details
- Date: August (from 2011); February (2003–2009)
- Region: Belize
- Local name(s): Tour of Belize
- Discipline: Road
- Type: Stage race
- Race director: Roque Matus

History
- First edition: 2003
- Editions: 7 (as of 2009)
- First winner: José Choto (BIZ)
- Most recent: Tanner Putt (USA)

The Tour of Belize is a road cycling stage race, covering a majority of the Belize countryside. The 2008 edition included six stages in more than five days. The race was started in 2003 by race director Roque Matus and was won by Belizean Jose Choto of Team Cayo.

The 2008 edition was the first time the race has not been won by a native. The 2008 edition also marks the first time a race in Belize has been recognized by the UCI, the international governing body for cycling.

== Previous winners ==
Year	Country	Rider	Team
2003	Belize	José Choto	Team Cayo
2004	Belize	Mateo Cruz	Team Santino's
2005	Belize	José Choto	Team Santino's
2006	Belize	Marlon Castillo	Team Santino's
2007	Belize	Marlon Castillo	Team Santino's
2008	Chile	Carlos Oyarzun	Tecos
2009	United States	Tanner Putt	United States (national team)
