= Brandon Feehery =

American cyclist

Personal information
- Born: April 17, 1992 (age 34) Homewood, Illinois, United States

Cycling career
- Sport: Cycling
- Current team: Project Echelon Racing
- Discipline: Road
- Role: Rider

Amateur teams
- 2010: South Chicago Wheelmen
- 2011: Mesa Cycles Racing
- 2012–2013: Astellas Oncology Cycling Team
- 2017: Crit Life
- 2018: Bare Racing
- 2018: Crankin Radlers-SCW
- 2019–: Project Echelon Racing

Professional team
- 2014–2016: Astellas

Brandon Feehery (born April 17, 1992) is an American professional racing cyclist. He rode in the men's team time trial at the 2015 UCI Road World Championships.

== Major results ==
2012
1st Villa Park Grand Prix
2014
3rd Overall Tour of America's Dairyland
3rd Overall Intelligentsia Cup
2015
1st Lincoln Park Criterium
1st Stage 4 Tour of America's Dairyland
4th White Spot / Delta Road Race
2017
1st Stage 11 Tour of America's Dairyland
1st Stage 1 Sunshine Grand Prix
2nd Overall Intelligentsia Cup

1st Stage 10

3rd Crystal Cup
2018
1st Marian Midwest Classic
2nd Overall Intelligentsia Cup

1st Stage 1

2019
1st Overall Intelligentsia Cup
2021
1st Shorewood Criterium Cycling Classic
1st Stage 8 Tour of America's Dairyland
2nd Overall Intelligentsia Cup

1st Stage 9

2022
1st American Criterium Cup
2nd Overall Intelligentsia Cup
4th Sunny King Criterium
4th Lake Bluff Criterium
5th Bailey & Glasser Twilight Criterium
7th Saint Francis Tulsa Tough
8t Littleton Twilight Criterium
9th Salt Lake Criterium
10th The Bommarito Audi Gateway Cup
2023
6th Sunny King Criterium
