= Champion System–Stan's NoTubes =

Cycling team (2014–)

Team information
- UCI code: CSN
- Registered: United States
- Founded: 2014
- Disbanded: 2016
- Discipline: Road
- Status: UCI Continental
- Bicycles: Champion System
- Website: Team home page

Key personnel
- General manager: Igor Volshteyn

Team name history
- 2014–2016: Champion System–Stan's NoTubes

Champion System–Stan's NoTubes is a UCI Continental cycling team based in New York City. It was founded in 2014.

== Team roster ==
Rider	Date of birth
Demis Alemán (ARG)	June 6, 1987 (age 39)
Andres Alzate (COL)	December 30, 1989 (age 36)
Fabio Calabria (AUS)	August 27, 1987 (age 39)
Zachary Carlson (USA)	April 25, 1995 (age 31)
Drew Christopher (USA)	September 16, 1984 (age 41)
Gavriel Epstein (CAN)	September 5, 1986 (age 40)
Bryan Gomez (COL)	November 19, 1994 (age 31)

Rider	Date of birth
Isaac Howe (USA)	March 4, 1986 (age 40)
James Laberge (USA)	July 1, 1993 (age 33)
Kevin Mullervy (USA)	April 8, 1988 (age 38)
Conor Mullervy (USA)	April 8, 1988 (age 38)
Greg Olsen (USA)	May 10, 1969 (age 57)
Juan Orlando Pimentel (USA)	May 9, 1995 (age 31)
Geron Williams (GUY)	May 23, 1991 (age 35)
