= Astellas Cycling Team =

American cycling team

Team information
- UCI code: ACT
- Registered: United States
- Founded: 2012
- Disbanded: 2016
- Discipline: Road
- Status: National (2012–2013); UCI Continental (2014–2016)
- Website: Team home page

Team name history
- 2012–2013 2014–2016: Astellas Oncology; Astellas Cycling Team

Astellas Cycling Team was an American UCI Continental cycling team. The team was originally established in 2012 as a Domestic Elite team under the name Astellas Oncology Cycling Team. The team turned professional and stepped up to UCI Continental status in 2014. In September 2016 the team confirmed that it had disbanded due to sponsor Astellas Pharma choosing to discontinue its funding, with the team having competed in its final race, the Boston Mayor's Cup, earlier that month.

== Team roster ==
As of 10 March 2016

Rider	Date of birth
Ryan Aitcheson (CAN)	April 1, 1991 (age 35)
Oliver Moors (GBR)	September 24, 1996 (age 29)
Ansel Dickey (USA)	March 11, 1995 (age 31)
Brandon Feehery (USA)	April 17, 1992 (age 34)
Daniel Gardner (GBR)	March 6, 1996 (age 30)
Matt Green (GBR)	October 2, 1988 (age 37)
Eamon Lucas (USA)	October 15, 1992 (age 33)
Max Jenkins (USA)	January 18, 1985 (age 41)

Rider	Date of birth
Clay Murfet (AUS)	February 22, 1989 (age 37)
Johnathan Freter (USA)	March 17, 1992 (age 34)
Aldo Ino Ilešič (Slovenia)	June 28, 1990 (age 36)
Travis Livermore (USA)	April 2, 1988 (age 38)
Jake Silverberg (USA)	May 18, 1996 (age 30)
Jacob Sitler (USA)	June 18, 1989 (age 37)
David Williams (USA)	June 19, 1988 (age 38)
