= Start Cycling Team =

Cycling team

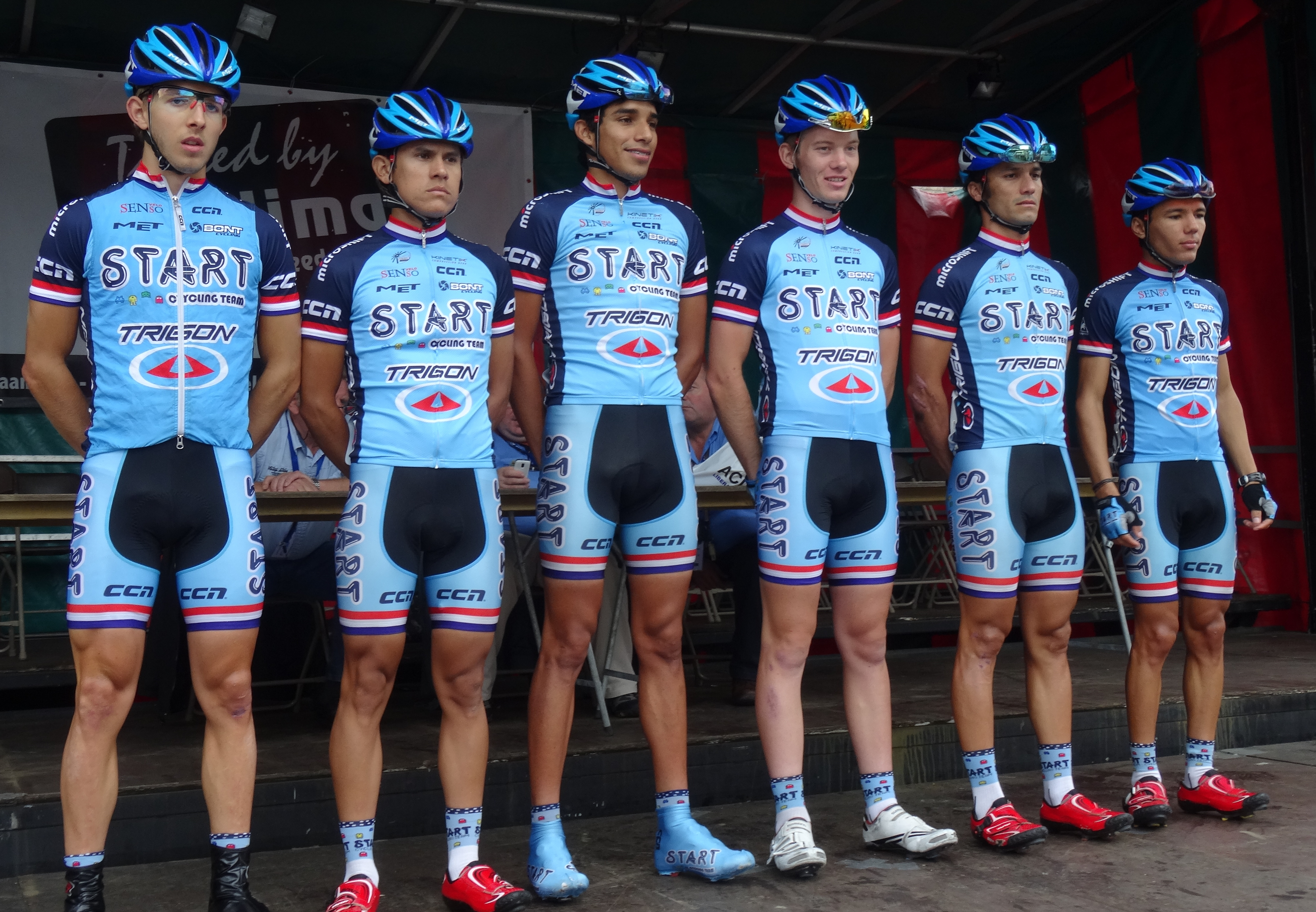
- The team in 2014

Team information
- UCI code: STF
- Registered: Paraguay (2012–2015); Serbia (2016); Bolivia (2017–2019); Venezuela (2021–2022)
- Founded: 2012
- Disbanded: 2022
- Discipline: Road
- Status: UCI Continental

Key personnel
- General manager: Mauricio Frazer
- Team managers: Gustavo Castaldi; Mario Patalagoytia; Leonel Vallina

Team name history
- 2012 2013–2014 2015 2016–2017 2018 2019–2022: Start Cycling Team–Atacama Flowery Desert; Start–Trigon Cycling Team; Start–Massi Cycling Team; Start–Vaxes Cycling Team; Start Team Gusto; Start Cycling Team

Start Cycling Team was a Venezuelan UCI Continental cycling team established in 2012. The team folded on 25 July 2022.

== Team roster ==
As of 25 February 2021.

Rider	Date of birth
José Autran (CHI)	14 December 1999 (age 26)
Albert Carrero (VEN)	23 February 2002 (age 24)
José Andrés Díaz (VEN)	13 October 2000 (age 25)
Griffin Easter (USA)	6 November 1991 (age 34)
Gregory Guevara (VEN)	24 March 2000 (age 26)

Rider	Date of birth
Reinier Honig (NED)	28 October 1983 (age 42)
Yilber Ramírez (VEN)	17 October 2001 (age 24)
José Luis Rodríguez Aguilar (CHI)	1 June 1994 (age 32)
Nicolás Vergara (CHI)	17 August 1998 (age 28)
Ignacio Villanueva (ARG)	8 October 1996 (age 29)

== Major wins ==
2013
Paraguay Time Trial Championships, Gustavo Miño
2014
Paraguay Time Trial Championships, Gustavo Miño
2018
Stage 10 Vuelta Ciclista a Venezuela, Orluis Aular
