= 2008 Tour de Vineyards =

Cycling competition in New Zealand

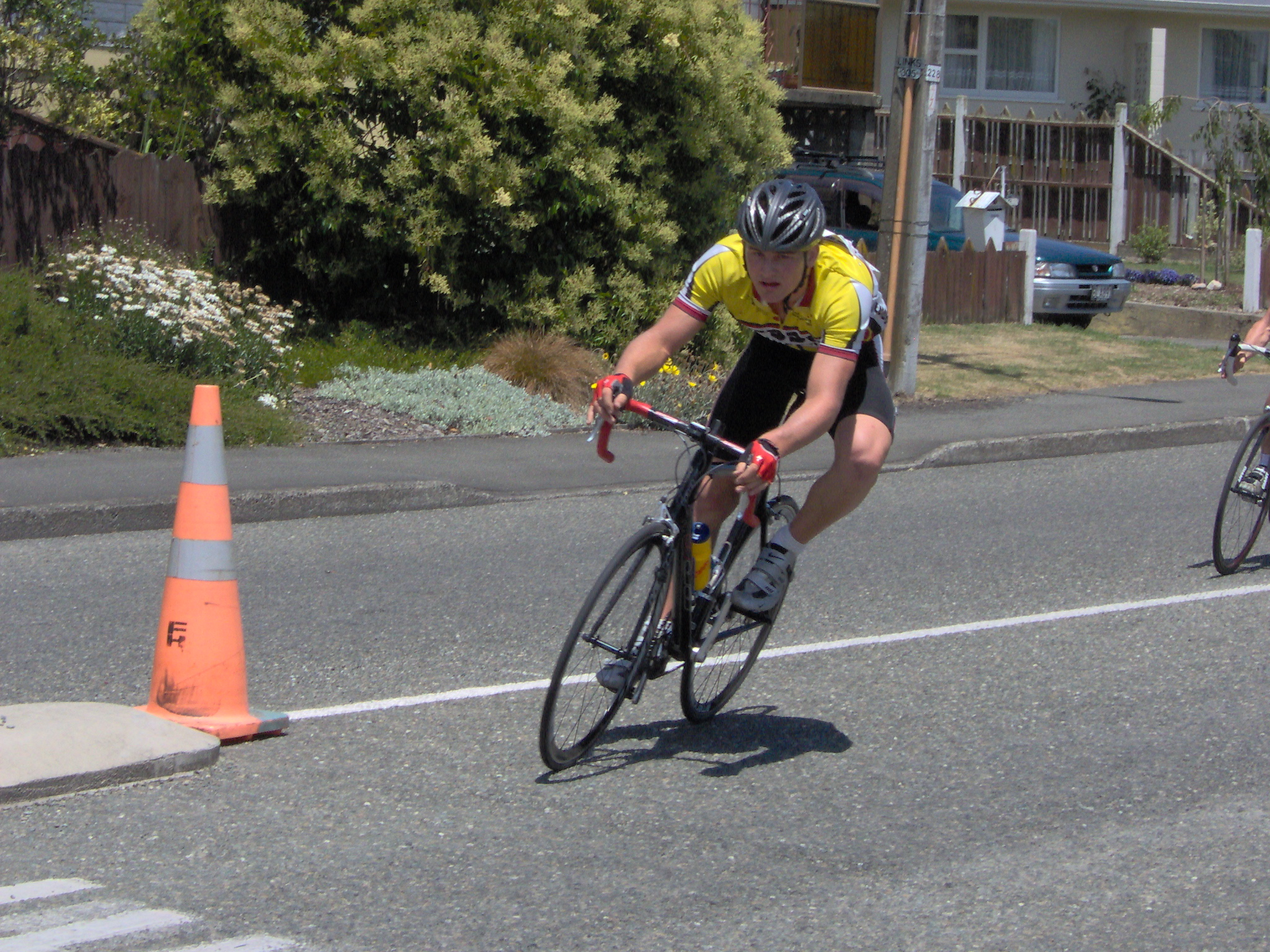
A rider corners during stage four of the 2008 Tour de Vineyards

The 2008 Tour de Vineyards was a cycling tour centered on the New Zealand city of Nelson, and was held between 2 and 5 January 2008. The men's race was eventually won by New Zealander Jeremy Yates, while fellow New Zealander Serena Sheridan took out the woman's title.

Full results of the race can be found on the cyclingnews.com website, here.

== Men's stage summary ==
Stage	Date	Start	Finish	Distance	Stage Top 3	Leading Top 3
1	2 January	Hope circuit	Hope circuit	55 km	(New Zealand) Paul Odlin (New Zealand) Gordon McCauley (New Zealand) Heath Blackgrove	(New Zealand) Paul Odlin (New Zealand) Gordon McCauley (New Zealand) Heath Blackgrove
2	3 January	Richmond	Saint Arnaud	90 km	(New Zealand) Hayden Roulston (New Zealand) Jeremy Yates (New Zealand) Heath Blackgrove	(New Zealand) Heath Blackgrove (New Zealand) Jeremy Yates (New Zealand) Hayden Roulston
3	4 January	Richmond	Marble Head	130 km	(New Zealand) Hayden Roulston (New Zealand) Jeremy Yates (New Zealand) Heath Blackgrove	(New Zealand) Jeremy Yates (New Zealand) Heath Blackgrove (New Zealand) Hayden Roulston
4	5 January	Hill circuit	Hill circuit	60 km	(New Zealand) Shane Archbold (New Zealand) Edward Barrett (New Zealand) Shem Rodger	(New Zealand) Jeremy Yates (New Zealand) Heath Blackgrove (New Zealand) Hayden Roulston

=== Men's top 10 overall ===
Pos	Rider	Time
1	(New Zealand) Jeremy Yates	8:19:01
2	(New Zealand) Heath Blackgrove	+ 0.02
3	(New Zealand) Hayden Roulston	+ 0.22
4	(New Zealand) Chris Sanson	+ 3.17
5	(New Zealand) Brett Dawber	+ 4.38
6	(New Zealand) George Bennett	+ 4.46
7	(New Zealand) Joseph Cooper	+ 4.55
8	(New Zealand) Ryan Wills	+ 6.02
9	(New Zealand) Justin Kerr	+ 6.08
10	(New Zealand) Josh Barley	+ 6.31

== Women's stage summary ==
Stage	Date	Start	Finish	Distance	Stage Top 3	Leading Top 3
1	2 January	Hope circuit	Hope circuit	35 km	(New Zealand) Serena Sheridan (New Zealand) Sarah Murdoch (New Zealand) Jeanne Kuhajek	(New Zealand) Serena Sheridan (New Zealand) Sarah Murdoch (New Zealand) Jeanne Kuhajek
2	3 January	Richmond	Saint Arnaud	90 km	(New Zealand) Jeanne Kuhajek (New Zealand) Karen Fulton (New Zealand) Serena Sheridan	(New Zealand) Serena Sheridan (New Zealand) Sarah Murdoch (New Zealand) Jeanne Kuhajek
3	4 January	Richmond	Marble Head	130 km	(New Zealand) Serena Sheridan (New Zealand) Jeanne Kuhajek (New Zealand) Sarah Murdoch	(New Zealand) Serena Sheridan (New Zealand) Sarah Murdoch (New Zealand) Jeanne Kuhajek
5	4 January	Hill circuit	Hill circuit	35 km	(New Zealand) Serena Sheridan (New Zealand) Karen Fulton (New Zealand) Tracy Clark	(New Zealand) Serena Sheridan (New Zealand) Sarah Murdoch (New Zealand) Jeanne Kuhajek

=== Women's top 8 overall ===
Pos	Rider	Time
1	(New Zealand) Serena Sheridan	8:47:52
2	(New Zealand) Sarah Murdoch	+ 5.42
3	(New Zealand) Jeanne Kuhajek	+ 8.18
4	(New Zealand) Karen Fulton	+ 11.40
5	(Germany) Britta Martin	+ 11.59
6	(New Zealand) Bronwyn Fraser	+ 32.14
7	(New Zealand) Tracy Clark	+ 33.04
8	(New Zealand) Liz Williamson	+ 41.02
