= 2007 in men's road cycling =

2007 in men's road cycling is about the 2007 men's bicycle races governed by the UCI.

== News ==
=== January ===
- 1 – Gordon McCauley wins the first race of 2007, which is the first stage of the 2007 Tour de Vineyards. He finishes in front of a leading group existing of three riders with the others being Clinton Robert Avery and Heath Blackgrove. nzherald.co.nz
- 1 – Shane Vasquez of Belize wins KREM New Years' Day Cycling Classic 2007 in his home country. dewielersite.net
- 2 – Ivan Basso receives the 40th Premio Sport Award, which is awarded by Enrico Morelli. Other nominees were Alfredo Martini, Franco Ballerini, Alessandro Petacchi, Francesco Chicchi, Michele Bartoli and Andrea Tafi. cyclingnews.com
- 2 – With his win in the second stage of the 2007 Tour de Vineyards Gordon McCauley wins his second consecutive race of 2007 and remains the only rider to win a professional road cycling race for the year. dunnersdan.com
- 3 – Due to troubles in organizing the 2007 ENECO Tour the race through the Netherlands and Belgium might be cancelled later in the season as directors Rob Discart and Henk van Mulukom are fighting about the planned sacking of Van Mulukom. shimano-benelux.nl
- 4 – Heath Blackgrove wins two stages in a row to claim the overall win in the 2007 Tour de Vineyards. sportzhub.com
- 6 – Brazilian Nilceu Santos wins the Copa América de Ciclismo in his home country. dewielersite.net
- 7 – Walter Bénéteau ends his career after seven years of professional cycling, finishing his career with a total of three wins. dewielersite.net
- 9 – Italian riders Nicolas Loda and Marco Milesi both end their career. cyclingpost.com
- 10 – Rabobank announces to remain the team's main sponsor until at least 2012. rabobank.com
- 12 – Nathan O'Neill clinches the Australian time trial championship title by finishing one minute and eleven seconds in front of second placed Rory Sutherland. theaustralian.news.com.au
- 11 – Unless signing doping accused Ivan Basso the team of Discovery Channel Pro Cycling Team remains part of the Pro Tour. They were risking to be rejected for the 2007 season. usatoday.com
- 12 – Pro Tour team Unibet.com Cycling Team is rejected to participate in Paris–Nice by the organisers. Instead of them continental team Agritubel is selected. The organisation behind the race is known to have troubles with the UCI and their Pro Tour system. cyclingpost.com
- 14 – Darren Lapthorne becomes Australian national road race champion after he finished 15 seconds ahead of a group riders led by Robert McLachlan. cyclingpost.com
- 15 – Former world champion Mario Cipollini will be taken to court or has to pay 1.5 million Euro's in a pending fraud case. dewielersite.net
- 18 – Le Monde reports that Óscar Pereiro, second in the Tour de France 2006 behind doping affected Floyd Landis also tested positive during the Tour. The substance found in his body, salbutamol is commonly used to cure asthma, and is allowed to be used in cycle racing if the cyclist can provide a medical prescription for the substance. It is alleged that the Union Cycliste Internationale gave Pereiro retroactive permission to use the substance on medical grounds after the positive tests. The French anti-doping agency questions the veracity of the medical grounds. dewielersite.net
- 19 – Baden Cooke wins the third stage in the 2007 Tour Down Under and celebrates the first victory of the Unibet.com Cycling Team as a member of the Pro Tour. cyclingpost.com
- 19 – Óscar Pereiro claims he is innocent and claims his use of salbutamol was legal. He said he has sent the correct documentation to the French doping agency to prove his words. dewielersite.net
- 19 – In the Cofidis doping case from 2004 seven people face punishments to a maximum of one year detention. Cyclists David Millar and Massimiliano Lelli were not punished. guardian.co.uk
- 23 – Johan Museeuw reveals that he has used doping during the last years of his career. Patrick Lefevere is blamed to be stimulating cyclists to use doping. The UCI announces that the last speculations against Óscar Pereiro were based on nothing. According to the UCI Pereiro did not use doping., , dewielersite.net
- 26 – Patrick Lefevere strikes back and takes the newspaper Het Laatste Nieuws to court after their recent doping stories about the Quick Step-Innergetic manager. hln.be
- 26 – The 2011 road cycling world championships will be held in Copenhagen according to a UCI official in Hooglede, Belgium. telesport.nl
- 27 – The 2007 Tour of Murcia originally scheduled from 7 to 11 March is cancelled and will not take place in 2007. telesport.nl
- 29 – Tony Houbrechts a former helper of Felice Gimondi is arrested and set to jail as he is suspected to have set up a drugs laboratorium. telesport.nl

== Continental Tours ==
=== UCI Africa Tour ===
Date	Place	Winner	Second	Third
16–21 January 2007	(Gabon) 2007 La Tropicale ABO	(France) Frédéric Guesdon	(France) Pierre Rolland	(Finland) Jussi Veikkanen

=== UCI America Tour ===
Date	Place	Winner	Second	Third
7–21 January 2007	(Venezuela) 2007 Vuelta al Táchira	(Colombia) Hernán Buenahora	(Venezuela) Manuel Medina	(Venezuela) Jackson Rodríguez
23–28 January 2007	(Argentina) 2007 Tour de San Luis	(Argentina) Jorge Giacinti	(Argentina) Fernando Antogna	(Spain) Francisco Mancebo

=== UCI Asia Tour ===
Date	Place	Winner	Second	Third
6–12 January 2007	2007 Jelajah Malaysia	(Iran) Mahdi Sohrabi	(Iran) Hossein Askari	(Denmark) Thomas Just
20–25 January 2007	(Thailand) 2007 Tour of Siam	(Australia) Jai Crawford	(Japan) Yukihiro Doi	(Australia) William Ford
28 January −2 February 2007	2007 Tour of Qatar	(Belgium) Wilfried Cretskens	(Belgium) Tom Boonen	(Netherlands) Steven de Jongh
2–11 February 2007	(Malaysia) 2007 Tour de Langkawi	(France) Anthony Charteau	(Colombia) José Serpa	(Colombia) Walter Pedraza

=== UCI Oceania Tour ===
Date	Place	Winner	Second	Third
17–21 January 2007	(Australia) 2007 Tour Down Under	(Switzerland) Martin Elmiger	(Australia) Karl Menzies	(Denmark) Lars Bak
24–28 January 2007	(New Zealand) 2007 Tour of Wellington	(New Zealand) Hayden Roulston	(Australia) Craig McCartney	(United Kingdom) Matthew Talbot

== Other multiple stage road races ==
Date	Place	Winner	Second	Third
1–4 January 2007	(New Zealand) 2007 Tour de Vineyards	(New Zealand) Heath Blackgrove	(New Zealand) Michael Torckler	(New Zealand) Gordon McCauley
3–7 January 2007	(Australia) 2007 Bay Classic Series	(Australia) Mark Renshaw	(Australia) Simon Gerrans	(Australia) Rory Sutherland
11–21 January 2007	(Argentina) 2007 Vuelta a San Juan	(Argentina) Luciano Montivero	(Argentina) Darío Díaz	(Argentina) Juan Pablo Dotti
2–11 February 2007	2007 Vuelta a Peru	in progress		
3–4 February 2007	(The Bahamas) 2007 Tour of the Bahamas	(Cuba) Frank Travieso	(United States) William Frischkorn	(United States) Craig Lewis
5–11 February 2007	(Argentina) 2007 Clásica del Oeste	in progress		

== Other single day road races ==
Date	Place	Winner	Second	Third
1 January	(Belize) Krem's New Year Cycling Classic	(Belize) Shane Vasquez	(Belize) Marlon Castillo	(Belize) Mateo Cruz
7 January	(Brazil) Copa América de Ciclismo	(Brazil) Nilceu Santos	(Brazil) Francisco Chamorro	(Brazil) Raphael Serpa
9 January	(Mali) 100 YFAMT Race	(Mali) Adam Toula	(Spain) Arkaitz Duran Aroca	
16 January	(Australia) 2007 Down Under Classic	(Australia) Mark Renshaw	(Australia) Hilton Clarke	(Australia) Simon Clarke
26 January	(Australia) Joseph Sunde Memorial	(Australia) Shaun Higgerson	(Australia) Trent Wilson	(Australia) Stewart Campbell
27 January	(New Zealand) Main Divide Cycle Race	(New Zealand) Oliver Pearce	(New Zealand) Edward Barrett	(New Zealand) Nathan Smith
28 January	(Brazil) Copa da Republica de Ciclismo	(Argentina) Francisco Chamorro	(Brazil) Kleber Neve	(Brazil) Fabielle Mota
28 January	(South Africa) Pick'n Pay Fast One	(South Africa) Malcolm Lange	(South Africa) Nolan Hoffman	(South Africa) Juan van Heerden
4 February	(South Africa) VW Herald	(South Africa) Jacques Janse van Rensburg	(South Africa) Jeremy Maartens	(South Africa) Waylon Woolcock
4 February	(South Africa) NBT Capital Classic	(South Africa) Arran Brown	(South Africa) Michael Thomson	(South Africa) Martin van Wijk

== Other single day time trials ==
Date	Place	Winner	Second	Third
4 February	(Malta) Qormi Dingli Circuit	(Malta) Etienne Bonello	(Malta) Johann Vassallo	(Malta) Ramon Grech

== See also ==
- 2007 in women's road cycling
- 2007 in track cycling
