= 2011–12 UCI Oceania Tour =

8th cycling competition

- Eighth edition of the UCI Oceania Tour

Details
- Dates: 12 October 2011–18 March 2012
- Location: Oceania
- Races: 4

Champions
- Individual champion: Paul Odlin (NZL) (Subway Cycling Team)
- Teams' champion: Team Jayco–AIS
- Nations' champion: Australia

The 2011–12 UCI Oceania Tour was the eighth season of the UCI Oceania Tour. The season began on 12 October 2011 with the Herald Sun Tour and ended on 18 March 2012 with the Oceania Cycling Championships.

The points leader, based on the cumulative results of previous races, wears the UCI Oceania Tour cycling jersey. Richard Lang of Australia was the defending champion of the 2011 UCI Oceania Tour. Paul Odlin of New Zealand was crowned as the 2011–12 UCI Oceania Tour champion.

Throughout the season, points are awarded to the top finishers of stages within stage races and the final general classification standings of each of the stages races and one-day events. The quality and complexity of a race also determines how many points are awarded to the top finishers, the higher the UCI rating of a race, the more points are awarded. The UCI ratings from highest to lowest are as follows:

- Multi-day events: 2.HC, 2.1 and 2.2
- One-day events: 1.HC, 1.1 and 1.2

== Events ==
=== 2011 ===
Date	Race name	Location	UCI Rating	Winner	Team
12–16 October	Herald Sun Tour	Australia	2.1	Nathan Haas (AUS)	Genesys Wealth Advisers

=== 2012 ===
Date	Race name	Location	UCI Rating	Winner	Team
25–29 January	Tour of Wellington	New Zealand	2.2	Jay McCarthy (AUS)	Team Jayco–AIS
16 March	Oceania Cycling Championships – Time Trial	New Zealand	CC	Sam Horgan (NZL)	New Zealand (national team)
18 March	Oceania Cycling Championships – Road Race	New Zealand	CC	Paul Odlin (NZL)	New Zealand (national team)

== Final standings ==
=== Individual classification ===
Rank	Name	Team	Points
1.	Paul Odlin (NZL)	Subway Cycling Team	122
2.	Nick Aitken (AUS)	Team Jayco–AIS	78
3.	Jay McCarthy (AUS)	Team Jayco–AIS	57
4.	Rhys Pollock (AUS)	Drapac Cycling	56
5.	Michael Vink (NZL)	Aisan Racing Team	55
6.	Mark O'Brien (AUS)	Team Budget Forklifts	50
7.	Reinardt Janse van Rensburg (RSA)	MTN–Qhubeka	46
8.	Samuel Horgan (NZL)	Subway Cycling Team	45
9.	Darren Lapthorne (AUS)	Drapac Cycling	43
10.	Steele Von Hoff (AUS)	Chipotle–First Solar Development Team	33

=== Team classification ===
Rank	Team	Points
1.	Team Jayco–AIS	188
2.	Subway Cycling Team	172
3.	Drapac Cycling	140
4.	Team Budget Forklifts	92
5.	Genesys Wealth Advisers	56
6.	MTN–Qhubeka	46
7.	Bissell	40
8.	Argos–Shimano	40
9.	Chipotle–First Solar Development Team	33
10.	Champion System	22

=== Nation classification ===
Rank	Nation	Points
1.	Australia	1445.13
2.	New Zealand	639

=== Nation under-23 classification ===
Rank	Nation under-23	Points
1.	Australia	984
2.	New Zealand	248
