= 2013 UCI Oceania Tour =

- Ninth edition of the UCI Oceania Tour

Details
- Dates: 23 January 2013–17 March 2013
- Location: Oceania
- Races: 3

Champions
- Individual champion: Damien Howson (AUS)
- Teams' champion: Huon Salmon–Genesys Wealth Advisers
- Nations' champion: Australia

The 2013 UCI Oceania Tour was the ninth season of the UCI Oceania Tour. The season began on 23 January 2013 with the New Zealand Cycle Classic and ended on 17 March 2013 with the Oceania Cycling Championships.

The points leader, based on the cumulative results of previous races, wears the UCI Oceania Tour cycling jersey. Paul Odlin from New Zealand was the defending 2011–12 UCI Oceania Tour champion. Damien Howson from Australia was crowned as the 2013 UCI Oceania Tour champion.

Throughout the season, points are awarded to the top finishers of stages within stage races and the final general classification standings of each of the stages races and one-day events. The quality and complexity of a race also determines how many points are awarded to the top finishers, the higher the UCI rating of a race, the more points are awarded. The UCI ratings from highest to lowest are as follows:

- Multi-day events: 2.HC, 2.1 and 2.2
- One-day events: 1.HC, 1.1 and 1.2

== Events ==
Date	Race Name	Location	UCI Rating	Winner	Team
23–27 January	New Zealand Cycle Classic	New Zealand	2.2	Nathan Earle (AUS)	Huon Salmon–Genesys Wealth Advisers
14 March	Oceania Cycling Championships – Time Trial	Australia	CC	Paul Odlin (NZL)	New Zealand (national team)
17 March	Oceania Cycling Championships – Road Race	Australia	CC	Cameron Meyer (AUS)	Australia (national team)

== Final standings ==
=== Individual classification ===
Rank	Name	Points
1.	Damien Howson (AUS)	86
2.	Nathan Earle (AUS)	68
3.	Benjamin Dyball (AUS)	64
4.	Neil Van Der Ploeg (AUS)	54
5.	Jack Anderson (AUS)	44
6.	Adam Phelan (AUS)	31
7.	William Walker (AUS)	30
8.	Joseph Cooper (NZL)	28
9.	Paul Odlin (NZL)	25
10.	Michael Torckler (NZL)	25

=== Team classification ===
Rank	Team	Points
1.	Huon Salmon-Genesys Wealth Advisers	209
2.	Team Budget Forklifts	81
3.	Drapac Cycling	79
4.	Bissell	30
5.	Bontrager Cycling Team	16
6.	OCBC Singapore Continental Cycling Team	15
7.	Node 4-Giordana Racing	15
8.	NetApp–Endura	8
9.	Thüringer Energie Team	2
10.	Champion System	2

=== Nation classification ===
Rank	Nation	Points
1.	Australia	1131
2.	New Zealand	425

=== Nation under-23 classification ===
Rank	Nation	Points
1.	Australia	645
2.	New Zealand	119
