= 2007 Tour de Vineyards =

Road cycling race in New Zealand

The 2007 Tour de Vineyards was held from 1 January to 4 January 2007 in New Zealand. It was a multiple stage road cycling race that sent the male riders around Richmond in four days with a total of 335 km (208 mi), while the female riders cycled a total of 290 km (180 mi). The male race was won by Heath Blackgrove, who also won two of the four stages, and the female race by Serena Sheridan who won three of the four stages.

== Men's stage summary ==
| Stage | Date | Start | Finish | Distance | Stage Top 3 | Leading Top 3 |
|---|---|---|---|---|---|---|
| 1 | 1 January | Hope circuit | Hope circuit | 55 km | (New Zealand) Gordon McCauley (New Zealand) Clinton Robert Avery (New Zealand) Heath Blackgrove | (New Zealand) Gordon McCauley (New Zealand) Clinton Robert Avery (New Zealand) Heath Blackgrove |
| 2 | 2 January | Richmond | Saint Arnaud | 90 km | (New Zealand) Gordon McCauley (New Zealand) Oliver Pearce (New Zealand) Heath Blackgrove | (New Zealand) Gordon McCauley (New Zealand) Heath Blackgrove (New Zealand) Oliver Pearce |
| 3 | 3 January | Richmond | Marble Head | 130 km | (New Zealand) Heath Blackgrove (New Zealand) Michael Torckler (New Zealand) Ashley Whitehead | (New Zealand) Heath Blackgrove (New Zealand) Michael Torckler (New Zealand) Gordon McCauley |
| 4 | 4 January | Hill circuit | Hill circuit | 60 km | (New Zealand) Heath Blackgrove (New Zealand) Clinton Robert Avery (New Zealand) Gordon McCauley | (New Zealand) Heath Blackgrove (New Zealand) Michael Torckler (New Zealand) Gordon McCauley |

=== Men's top 10 overall ===
| Pos | Rider | Time |
|---|---|---|
| 1 | (New Zealand) Heath Blackgrove | 8:41.13 |
| 2 | (New Zealand) Michael Torckler | + 2.38 |
| 3 | (New Zealand) Gordon McCauley | + 3.11 |
| 4 | (New Zealand) Steve Stannard | + 4.21 |
| 5 | (New Zealand) Ashley Whitehead | + 4.28 |
| 6 | (New Zealand) Shane Archbold | + 6.22 |
| 7 | (New Zealand) Daniel Barry | + 6.23 |
| 8 | (New Zealand) Joshua Barley | + 6.28 |
| 9 | (New Zealand) Richard Speer | + 8.10 |
| 10 | (New Zealand) Ryan Wills | + 10.30 |

== Women's stage summary ==
| Stage | Date | Start | Finish | Distance | Stage Top 3 | Leading Top 3 |
|---|---|---|---|---|---|---|
| 1 | 1 January | Hope circuit | Hope circuit | 35 km | (New Zealand) Tracy Clark (New Zealand) Carissa Wilkes (New Zealand) Annelies Basten | (New Zealand) Tracy Clark (New Zealand) Carissa Wilkes (New Zealand) Annelies Basten |
| 2 | 2 January | Richmond | Saint Arnaud | 90 km | (New Zealand) Serena Sheridan (New Zealand) Karen Fulton (New Zealand) Annelies Basten | (New Zealand) Karen Fulton (New Zealand) Annelies Basten (New Zealand) Serena Sheridan |
| 3 | 3 January | Richmond | Marble Head | 130 km | (New Zealand) Serena Sheridan (New Zealand) Annelies Basten (New Zealand) Gina Waibl | (New Zealand) Serena Sheridan (New Zealand) Annelies Basten (New Zealand) Gina Waibl |
| 4 | 4 January | Hill circuit | Hill circuit | 35 km | (New Zealand) Serena Sheridan (New Zealand) Gina Waibl (New Zealand) Brenda Clapp | (New Zealand) Serena Sheridan (New Zealand) Gina Waibl (New Zealand) Annelies Basten |

=== Women's top 10 overall ===
| Pos | Rider | Time |
|---|---|---|
| 1 | (New Zealand) Serena Sheridan | 9:35.44 |
| 2 | (New Zealand) Gina Waibl | + 0.10 |
| 3 | (New Zealand) Annelies Basten | + 2.19 |
| 4 | (New Zealand) Dale Tye | + 3.02 |
| 5 | (New Zealand) Brenda Clapp | + 4.25 |
| 6 | (New Zealand) Kerri-Anne Torkler | + 6.28 |
| 7 | (New Zealand) Jeannie Kuhajek | + 7.34 |
| 8 | (New Zealand) Karen Fulton | + 10.00 |
| 9 | (New Zealand) Tracy Clark | + 13.16 |
| 10 | (New Zealand) Lauren Ellis | + 31.03 |
