= New Zealand National Time Trial Championships =

National road cycling championship in New Zealand

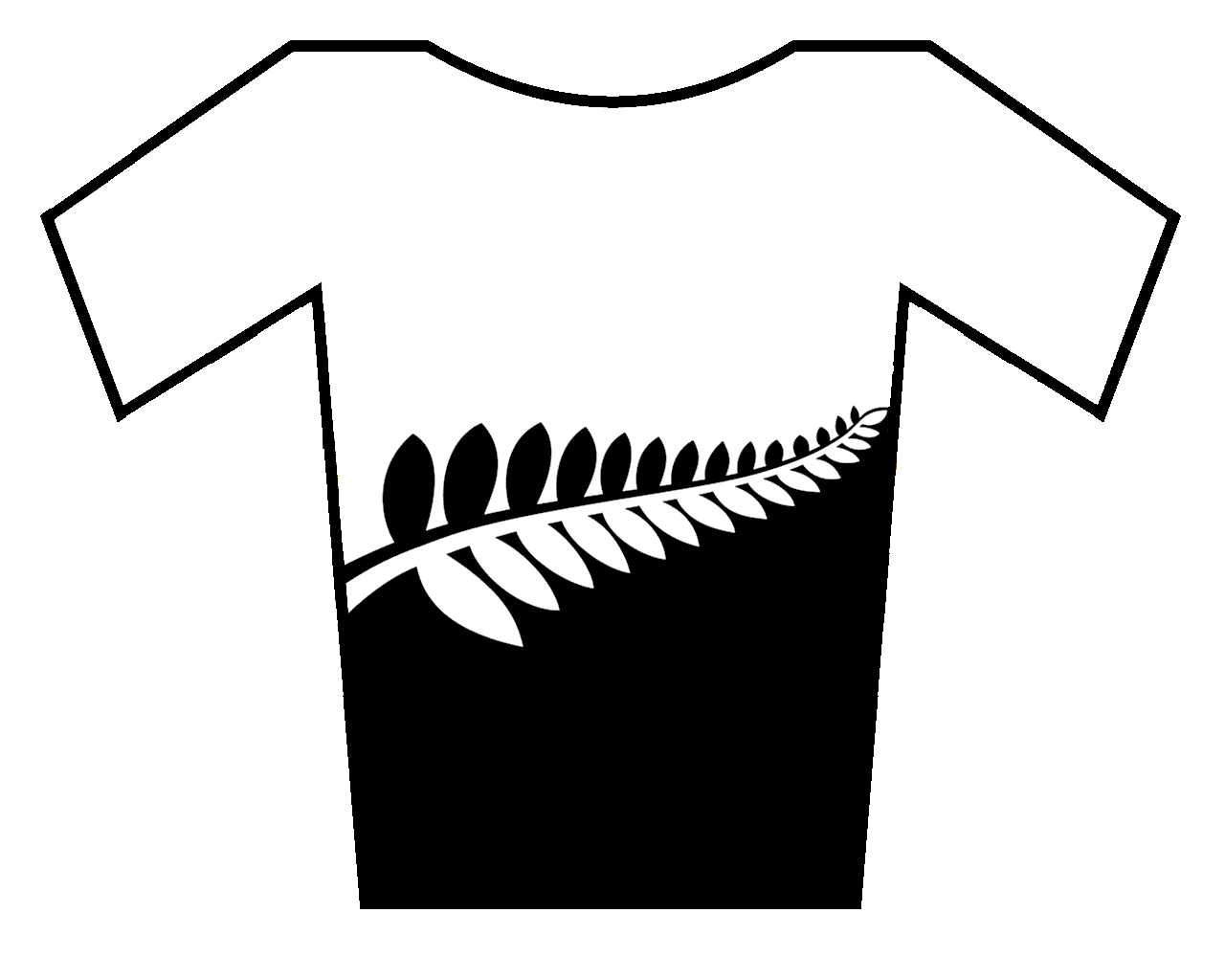
The champion's jersey

The New Zealand National Time Trial Championship is a road bicycle race that takes place inside the New Zealand National Cycling Championship, and decides the best cyclist in this type of race. The first edition took place in 1995. The first race winner of the road race championship was Brian Fowler. The record for the most wins in the men's championship is held by Gordon McCauley (3). The current men's champion is Regan Gough. The women's record is held by Melissa Holt and Georgia Williams with 5 wins.

== Multiple winners ==
Men

Wins	Name	Years
3	Gordon McCauley	2002, 2003, 2010
2	David Lee	1998, 1999
2	Patrick Bevin	2016, 2019
2	Hamish Bond	2018, 2020
2	Aaron Gate	2021, 2023
2	Finn Fisher-Black	2025, 2026

Women

Wins	Name	Years
5	Melissa Holt	2001, 2002, 2008, 2009, 2010
5	Georgia Williams	2018, 2019, 2021, 2022, 2023
3	Jaime Nielsen	2014, 2015, 2017
2	Kirsty Robb	1998, 2000
2	Dale Tye	2003, 2004
2	Alison Shanks	2006, 2007
2	Kim Cadzow	2024, 2025

== Men ==
=== Elite ===
New Zealand National Time Trial Championships – Men's elite time trial
Race details
- Region: New Zealand
- Discipline: Road bicycle racing
- Type: One-day

History
- First edition: 1995
- First winner: Brian Fowler
- Most wins: Gordon McCauley (3 wins)
- Most recent: Finn Fisher-Black

Year	Gold	Silver	Bronze
1995	Brian Fowler	Matthew Brick	Ewan McMaster
1996	Greg Henderson	Brian Fowler	Jared Caldwell
1997	Chris Nicholson	Gordon McCauley	Leon Hallet
1998	David Lee	John Hume	Robin Reid
1999	David Lee	Chris Nicholson	David Comerford
2000	Lee Vertongen	Greg Henderson	Gary Anderson
2001	Brendon Cameron	Scott Guyton	Bryce Shapley
2002	Gordon McCauley	Glen Mitchell	Hayden Godfrey
2003	Gordon McCauley	Heath Blackgrove	Glen Mitchell
2004	Heath Blackgrove	Robin Reid	Jason Allen
2005	Robin Reid	Gordon McCauley	Jeremy Vennell
2006	Marc Ryan	Robin Reid	Hayden Godfrey
2007	Glen Chadwick	Gordon McCauley	Aaron Strong
2008	Logan Hutchings	Paul Odlin	Gordon McCauley
2009	Jeremy Vennell	Robin Reid	Chris Nicholson
2010	Gordon McCauley	Jeremy Vennell	Marc Ryan
2011	Westley Gough	Jesse Sergent	Greg Henderson
2012	Paul Odlin	Samuel Horgan	Jesse Sergent
2013	Joseph Cooper	Paul Odlin	Westley Gough
2014	Taylor Gunman	Samuel Horgan	Jason Christie
2015	Michael Vink	Joseph Cooper	Patrick Bevin
2016	Patrick Bevin	Tom Scully	Joseph Cooper
2017	Jack Bauer	Jason Christie	Hamish Bond
2018	Hamish Bond	Michael Vink	Jason Christie
2019	Patrick Bevin	Hamish Bond	Hayden McCormick
2020	Hamish Bond	George Bennett	Dylan Kennett
2021	Aaron Gate	George Bennett	Michael Vink
2022	Regan Gough	Michael Vink	Thomas Sexton
2023	Aaron Gate	George Bennett	James Oram
2024	Logan Currie	Aaron Gate	Laurence Pithie
2025	Finn Fisher-Black	Aaron Gate	Tom Sexton
2026	Finn Fisher-Black	Glenn Haden	Ben Oliver

=== U23 ===
New Zealand National Time Trial Championships – Men's U23 time trial
Race details
- Region: New Zealand
- Discipline: Road bicycle racing
- Type: One-day

History
- First edition: 2003
- First winner: Peter Latham
- Most wins: Michael Vink (3 wins)
- Most recent: Reef Roberts

Year	Gold	Silver	Bronze
2003	Peter Latham	Timothy Gudsell	Jeremy Yates
2004	Peter Latham	Marc Ryan	Timothy Gudsell
2005	Logan Hutchings	Matthew Haydock	Joseph Cooper
2006	Clinton Avery	Joseph Cooper	Darren Shea
2007	Matthew Haydock	Joseph Cooper	Clinton Avery
2008	Clinton Avery	Westley Gough	Matthew Haydock
2009	Michael Torckler	Ryan Wills	Matthew Sillars
2010	Michael Vink	Westley Gough	Jesse Sergent
2011	Jason Christie	Michael Vink	Alex McGregor
2012	Michael Vink	Jason Christie	Fraser Gough
2013	Michael Vink	James Oram	Taylor Gunman
2014	Fraser Gough	James Oram	Dion Smith
2016	Hayden McCormick	Liam Aitcheson	Hamish Schreurs
2017	Regan Gough	James Fouché	James Marryatt
2018	Ian Talbot	Jake Marryatt	James Fouché
2019	James Fouché	Ben Hamilton	Kees Duyvesteyn
2020	Finn Fisher-Black	Ethan Batt	Logan Currie
2021	Finn Fisher-Black	Logan Currie	Dylan McCullough
2022	Logan Currie	Laurence Pithie	Keegan Hornblow
2023	Logan Currie	Laurence Pithie	Alexander White
2024	Guy Yarrell	Lucas Murphy	Lewis Bower
2025	Nate Pringle	Reef Roberts	Noah Hollamby
2026	Reef Roberts	Noah Hollamby	Lewis Bower

== Women ==
=== Elite ===
New Zealand National Time Trial Championships – Women's elite time trial
Race details
- Region: New Zealand
- Discipline: Road bicycle racing
- Type: One-day

History
- First edition: 1995
- First winner: Jacqui Nelson
- Most wins: Melissa Holt and Georgia Williams (5 wins)
- Most recent: Ella Wyllie

The following elite women have gained podium places.

Year	Gold	Silver	Bronze
1995	Jacqui Nelson	Joanna Lawn	Janet O'Hara
1996	Kathy Lynch	Joanna Lawn	Charlotte Cox
1997	Charlotte Cox	Janet O'Hara	Tracey Laurence
1998	Kirsty Robb	Annaliisa Farrell	Vanessa Cheatley-Guyton
1999	Annaliisa Farrell	Fanny Lariviere	Benita Douglas
2000	Kirsty Robb	Annaliisa Farrell	Benita Douglas
2001	Melissa Holt	Annaliisa Farrell	Tamara Boyd
2002	Melissa Holt	Dale Tye	Annaliisa Farrell
2003	Dale Tye	Johanna Buick	Penny Pawson
2004	Dale Tye	Annaliisa Farrell	Tamara Boyd
2005	Sarah Ulmer	Melissa Holt	Alison Shanks
2006	Alison Shanks	Josie Giddens	Yvette Hill-Willis
2007	Alison Shanks	Annelies Basten	Dale Tye
2008	Melissa Holt	Rachel Mercer	Alison Shanks
2009	Melissa Holt	Sonia Waddell	Dale Tye
2010	Melissa Holt	Alison Shanks	Linda Villumsen
2011	Sonia Waddell	Jaime Nielsen	Alison Shanks
2012	Lauren Ellis	Jaime Nielsen	Alison Shanks
2013	Linda Villumsen	Jaime Nielsen	Georgia Williams
2014	Jaime Nielsen	Linda Villumsen	Reta Trotman
2015	Jaime Nielsen	Linda Villumsen	Lauren Ellis
2016	Rushlee Buchanan	Jaime Nielsen	Sharlotte Lucas
2017	Jaime Nielsen	Georgia Williams	Rushlee Buchanan
2018	Georgia Williams	Rushlee Buchanan	Bronwyn MacGregor
2019	Georgia Williams	Rushlee Buchanan	Holly Edmondston
2020	Teresa Adam	Georgia Perry	Bronwyn MacGregor
2021	Georgia Williams	Jaime Nielsen	Bronwyn MacGregor
2022	Georgia Williams	Bronwyn MacGregor	Holly Edmondston
2023	Georgia Williams	Georgia Perry	Sharlotte Lucas
2024	Kim Cadzow	Mikayla Harvey	Kate Mccarthy
2025	Kim Cadzow	Ella Wyllie	Henrietta Christie
2026	Ella Wyllie	Mikayla Harvey	Bryony Botha

=== U23 ===
New Zealand National Time Trial Championships – Women's elite time trial
Race details
- Region: New Zealand
- Discipline: Road bicycle racing
- Type: One-day

History
- First edition: 2017
- First winner: Mikayla Harvey
- Most wins: No repeat winners
- Most recent: Kirsty Watts

Year	Gold	Silver	Bronze
2017	Mikayla Harvey	Georgia Catterick	Rylee McMullen
2018	Georgia Catterick	Mikayla Harvey	Libby Arbuckle
2019	Jenna Merrick	Georgia Christie	Libby Arbuckle
2020	Ella Harris	Mikayla Harvey	Niamh Fisher-Black
2021	Henrietta Christie	Mckenzie Milne	Stella Nightingale
2022	Kim Cadzow	Ella Wyllie	Henrietta Christie
2023	Ally Wollaston	Henrietta Christie	Ella Wyllie
2024	Ella Wyllie	Charlotte Clarke	Maia Barclay
2025	Kirsty Watts	Alex Rawlinson	Ava Maddison
2026	Kirsty Watts	Amelia Sykes	Ava Maddison
