= Oliver Pearce =

Oliver Pearce may refer to:-

- Oliver Pearce (cyclist) (born 1987), New Zealand cyclist, see 2007 Tour de Vineyards
- Ollie Pearce (born 1995), English footballer
