= Sharlotte Lucas =

New Zealand professional racing cyclist

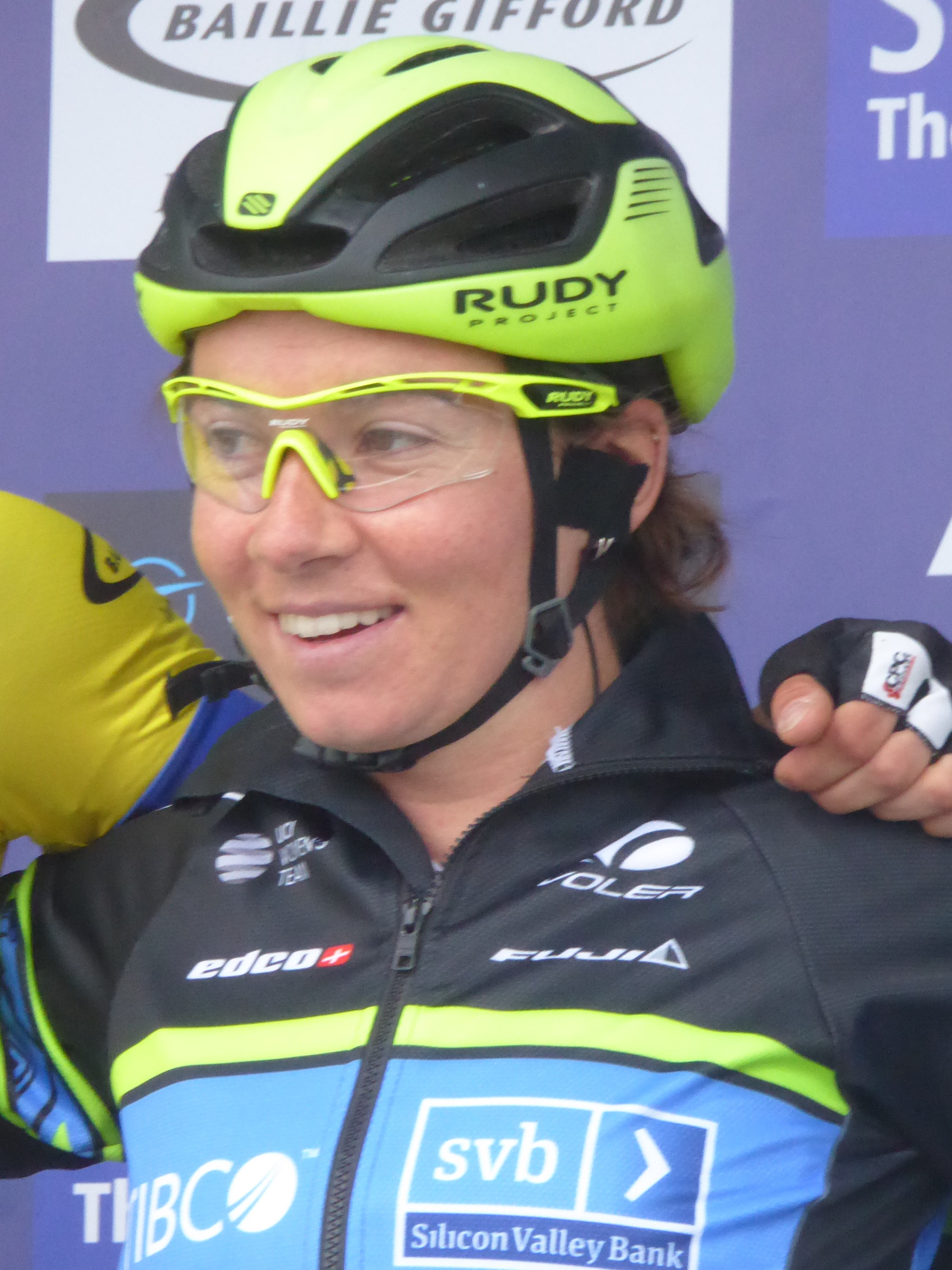
- Lucas at the 2019 Women's Tour of Scotland

Personal information
- Full name: Sharlotte Lucas
- Born: 25 July 1991 (age 35) Hokitika, New Zealand

Cycling career
- Sport: Cycling
- Current team: Hokitika Cycling Club
- Discipline: Road
- Role: Rider

Amateur teams
- 2015–2016: Holden Women's Racing
- 2017–2018: Roxsolt
- 2018: Specialized Women's Racing
- 2023: Hokitika Cycling Club
- 2024: Black Dirt Collective
- 2025–: Hokitika Cycling Club

Professional teams
- 2019–2020: Tibco–Silicon Valley Bank
- 2021: DNA Pro Cycling

Sharlotte Lucas (born 25 July 1991) is a New Zealand road racing cyclist, who rides for New Zealand amateur team Hokitika Cycling Club.

Based in Hokitika, New Zealand, Lucas took up competitive cycling in 2010 after taking a break from football. Since then Lucas has quickly added an impressive list of results, alongside of showing her ability to work as a domestique for her teammates. Lucas is a three times winner of the Calder Stewart Elite Teams Series and the current course record holder and three times race winner of Le Race in New Zealand.

== Major results ==
2013
1st Le Race
2015
1st Le Race
National Road Championships

2nd Road race
4th Time trial

2016
National Road Championships

3rd Time trial
7th Road race

9th Overall Mersey Valley Tour
2017
1st Stan Siejka Launceston Cycling Classic
1st Taupo Cycle Challenge Criterium
1st Le Race
1st Nelson Bays Motor Group Nelson Classic
Calder Stewart Road Race Series

1st Timaru
1st Hokitika Classic
1st Hell of the South
2nd Gore Bay
3rd Dunedin

1st Ride the Rakaia
1st Leeston Classic
2nd Taupo Cycle Challenge
3rd Overall Amy's Otway Tour
3rd Oklahoma Pro AM Classic
Oceania Road Championships

4th Time trial
8th Road race

National Road Championships

4th Road race
4th Time trial

Tour of America's Dairyland

4th Kenosha
6th Schlitz Park
9th West Bend
10th Port Washington

5th Overall Tour of the King Valley
5th Shimano Sprint Series White Bay Criterium
7th Overall Mersey Valley Tour
8th Tulsa Tough Blue Dome Criterium
2018
Oceania Road Championships

1st Road race
3rd Time trial

National Road Championships

2nd Road race
5th Time trial

2nd Overall Tour of America's Dairyland
4th Road race, Commonwealth Games
7th Cadel Evans Great Ocean Road Race
2019
Oceania Road Championships

1st Road race
4th Time trial

6th Road race, National Road Championships
2021
2nd Gravel and Tar Classic
3rd Road race, National Road Championships
2023
National Road Championships

3rd Road race
3rd Time trial

2024
Oceania Road Championships

4th Time trial
5th Road race
