= Jason Allen (cyclist) =

New Zealand cyclist (born 1981)

Personal information
- Full name: Jason Allen
- Born: 17 August 1981 (age 45)

Cycling career
- Sport: Cycling
- Current team: Retired
- Discipline: Road
- Role: Rider

Amateur teams
- 2014: Scotty Browns - Vision Systems
- 2016: Mike Greer Homes

Professional teams
- 2003: Miche–Guerciotti
- 2005: McGuire - Langdale
- 2006: Kodakgallery.com - Sierra Nevada Pro Cycling
- 2006–2007: Plowman Craven–Madison.co.uk
- 2009–2011: Subway Cycling Team

Jason Allen (born 17 August 1981 in Christchurch) is a New Zealand cyclist with 30 national titles, an Oceania title, represented his country at the Commonwealth Games and also won two gold medals at the Track Cycling World Cup.

He was Marlborough Sportsperson of the Year. He rode for the Subway-Avanti team from 2009 till 2011.

== Major results ==
2002
1st Stage 4 Tour of Southland
2003
1st Stage 1 Tour de Vineyards
2004
1st Team pursuit UCI World Cup Classics, Sydney
2nd Team pursuit UCI World Cup Classics, Los Angeles
2005
1st Stage 7 Tour of Southland
2nd Tour of Somerville
Oceania Games

1st Pursuit
1st Team pursuit

1st Team pursuit UCI World Cup Classics, Manchester
2nd National Track Championships - Madison (with Anthony Chapman)
2007
1st Stage 9 Tour de la Nouvelle-Calédoni
2009
3rd National Road Race Championships
2011
1st Stage 1 TTTTour of Southland
7th Ocbc Cycle Classic Singapore
2016
1st Stage 1 TTTTour of Southland
