= Tour de Flores =

Race details
- Date: May (2016); July (2017)
- Region: Flores
- Nickname: TdF
- Discipline: Road
- Competition: UCI Asia Tour
- Type: Stage race
- Web site: www.tourdeflores.org

History
- First edition: 2016
- Editions: 2 (As of 2017)
- First winner: Daniel Whitehouse (GBR)
- Most wins: No repeat winners
- Most recent: Thomas Lebas (FRA)

Tour de Flores (abbreviated TdF) is a multi-day cycling race on the Indonesian island of Flores. It is part of UCI Asia Tour in category 2.2. Aside from Larantuka, Labuan Bajo and Komodo National Park, the cyclists race along natural and cultural wonders of Flores Island such as the tricolor lake on Mt. Kelimutu, the megalithic village of Bena, and the exiled house of Indonesia’s first president, Sukarno in Ende. Tour de Flores had become an annual international cycling event since 2016.

== Winners ==
Year	Country	Rider	Team
2016	Great Britain	Daniel Whitehouse	Terengganu Cycling Team
2017	France	Thomas Lebas	Kinan Cycling Team

== 2016 Tour de Flores ==
The event was held from May 16 to 26. Cyclists from twenty countries participated in the cycling tour, with a total race length of 661.5 kilometers, starting from the capital city of East Flores Regency, Larantuka to Labuan Bajo, the capital of West Manggarai Regency.

== 2017 Tour de Flores ==
Tour de Flores (TdF) 2017 was held from July 14 to 19. A change of route had been made, the race extended from 661.5 kilometers to 808 kilometers due to an additional new route from Aegela to Mbay in Nagekeo Regency. Twenty teams, including 17 foreign teams from the United Kingdom, Europe, Africa, Japan, South Korea, China, Australia, Thailand and Malaysia participated the event. The race is divided into six legs:

- Larantuka – Maumere (138.5 kilometers),
- Maumere – Ende (141.3 kilometers),
- Ende – Mbay (111 kilometers),
- Mbay – Borong (151 kilometers),
- Borong – Ruteng (58 kilometers), and
- Ruteng – Labuan Bajo (121.5 kilometers).
