= Bryce Shapley =

New Zealand cyclist

Personal information
- Born: 26 December 1974 (age 51) New Zealand

Cycling career
- Sport: Cycling
- Current team: Retired
- Discipline: Road
- Role: Rider

Professional team
- 2000–2001: Flanders - Prefetex

Bryce Shapley (born 26 December 1974) is an ex-professional New Zealand cyclist who last rode for Flanders - Prefetex.

== Major results ==
1998
2nd National Cross Country MTB
2000
2nd Overall Tour of Wellington

1st Stage 5

2001
1st Stage 2 Ytong Bohemia Tour
3rd National Time Trial Championship
2002
3rd Overall Tour of Wellington
