= Melissa Holt =

New Zealand cyclist (born 1976)

Personal information
- Full name: Melissa Holt
- Born: 11 December 1976 (age 49) New Zealand

Cycling career
- Sport: Cycling
- Discipline: Road
- Role: Rider

Professional teams
- 2002: Rona
- 2003: Team Rona Esker
- 2005: Team S.A.T.S
- 2007: Team Expresscopy.com

Melissa Holt (born 11 December 1976) is a racing cyclist from New Zealand. She won the New Zealand National Time Trial Championships a record equaling five times and finished 2nd once. She won the New Zealand National Road Race Championships three times, finished 2nd three times and finished 3rd once. In the Australia World Cup she placed 7th in 2002 and 4th in 2003. In the New Zealand World Cup she placed 6th in 2005. She finished 3rd in the 2005 Luk Challenge. In the Geelong Tour she placed 2nd overall in 2006. She placed 2nd in the 2009 Oceania Continental Championships Time Trial only four seconds behind the winner. She competed at the Commonwealth Games three times, finishing 9th in the time trial in 2002, 4th in the time trial in 2006, and 5th in the time trial and 9th in the road race in 2010. She competed at the world championships in both the road race and time trial in 2002, 2003 and 2005, but in 2010 she only competed in the time trial.

She competed in the women's individual road race at the 2004 Summer Olympics.

Outside of cycling, Holt also participated in multiple ironmans.
