= Reta Trotman =

New Zealand cyclist

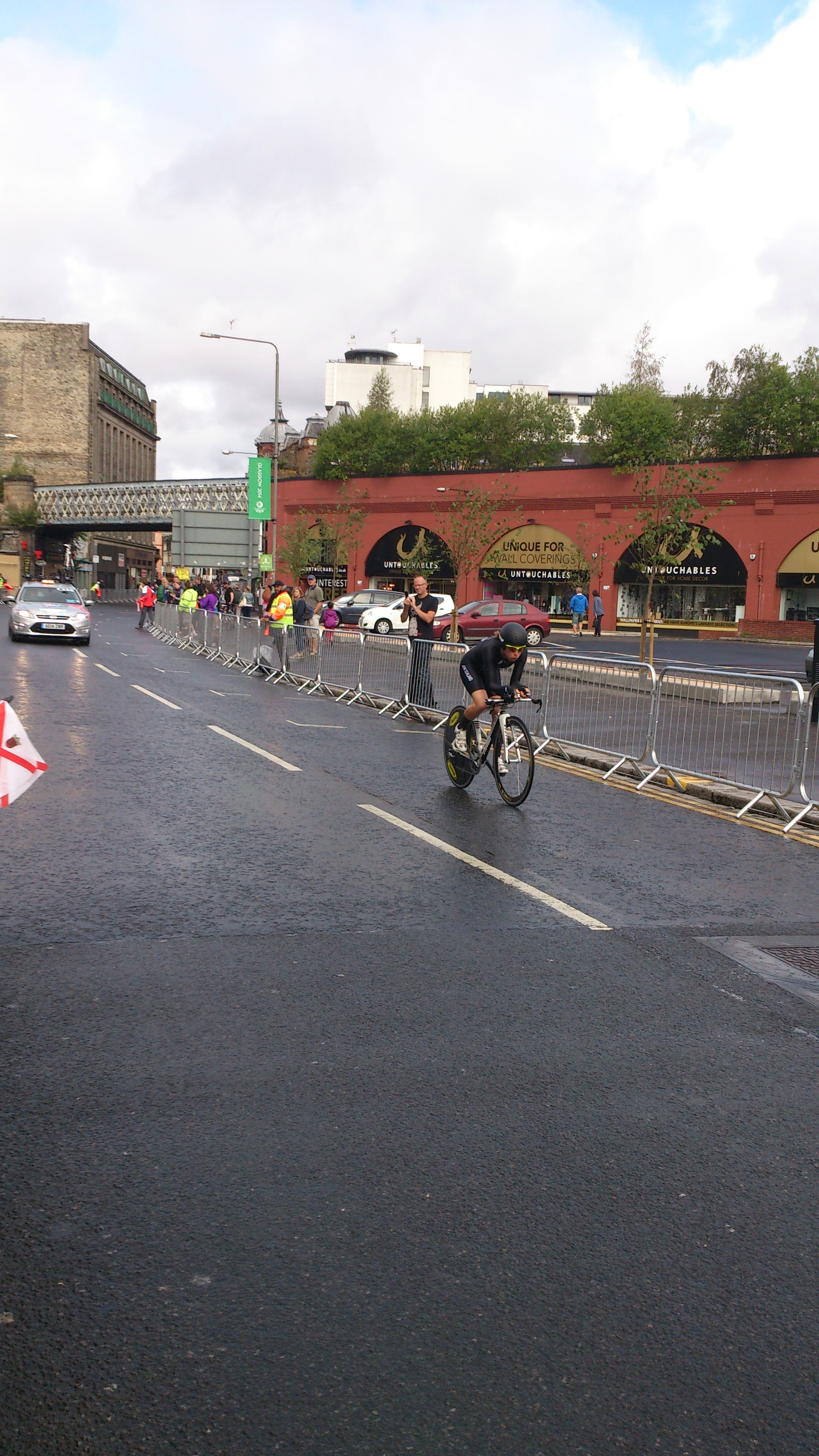
- Trotman at the 2014 Commonwealth Games

Personal information
- Born: 10 March 1989 (age 37) Palmerston North, New Zealand
- Height: 1.66 m (5 ft 5 in)

Cycling career
- Sport: Cycling
- Disciplines: Road; Mountain biking
- Role: Rider

Amateur team
- 2013–2014: Maxx-Solar Cycling
Medal record
Representing New Zealand
Women's road bicycle racing
Oceania Championships
Bronze medal – third place	2014 Toowoomba	Time trial

Reta Trotman (born 10 March 1989) is a New Zealand racing cyclist. She competed in the 2013 UCI women's road race in Florence.

== Major results ==
2011
1st Le Race
2012
1st Le Race
5th Overall Women's Tour of New Zealand
8th Road race, Oceania Road Cycling Championships
2014
1st Le Race
Oceania Road Cycling Championships

3rd Time trial
6th Road race

National Road Championships

3rd Time trial
3rd Road race

5th Overall Auensteiner-Radsporttage
5th Overall Internationale Thüringen Rundfahrt der Frauen
6th GP du Canton d'Argovie
8th Nagrada Ljubljane TT
10th Overall Giro della Toscana Int. Femminile – Memorial Michela Fanini
