= Kirsty Robb =

New Zealand cyclist

Personal information
- Full name: Kirsty Nicole Robb
- Born: 23 May 1979 (age 47) New Zealand

Cycling career
- Sport: Cycling
- Discipline: Road cycling

Professional teams
- 2001: Bik-Toscany Sport
- 2002: Team Farm Frites–Hartol
- 2003: Bik-Power Plate
- 2004: Therme Skin Care

Kirsty Nicole Robb (born 23 May 1979) is a road cyclist from New Zealand. She represented her nation at the 1999, 2001, 2002 and 2003 UCI Road World Championships. She won the New Zealand National Time Trial Championships in 1998 and 2000.
