= Daniel Whitehouse =

British cyclist

Personal information
- Full name: Daniel Whitehouse
- Born: 12 January 1995 (age 31) Manchester, United Kingdom
- Height: 1.71 m (5 ft 7 in)
- Weight: 58 kg (128 lb)

Cycling career
- Sport: Cycling
- Discipline: Road
- Role: Rider

Amateur team
- 2017: CCN

Professional teams
- 2014: Rapha Condor–JLT
- 2015: Team UKYO
- 2016–2017: Terengganu Cycling Team
- 2018: Interpro Stradalli
- 2019–2020: EvoPro Racing

Daniel Whitehouse (born 12 January 1995) is a British cyclist, who most recently rode for UCI Continental team EvoPro Racing. He has also competed for New Zealand during his career, having received his education at Christchurch Boys' High School and lived in Christchurch, New Zealand.

== Major results ==
2014
4th Overall New Zealand Cycle Classic
2015
3rd Overall Tour de Ijen
2016
1st Overall Tour de Flores

1st Stage 2

4th Overall Tour of Japan

1st Young rider classification

4th Overall Tour de Ijen
2017
2nd Overall Tour de Filipinas

1st Young rider classification
1st Stage 1

2nd Overall Tour de Singkarak

1st Stage 2

6th Overall Tour de Flores

1st Stage 5

2018
1st Le Race
1st Mountains classification, Vuelta a Castilla y León
2nd Overall Tour de Beauce
5th Overall Tour de Indonesia
2019
1st Le Race (course record)
4th Overall New Zealand Cycle Classic
2024
10th Overall Tour of Southland

1st Stage 5

2026
3rd Overall Tour of Southland
