= VW Herald =

Men's road cycling race in South Africa

The VW Herald is a single day men's road cycling race held in South Africa.

== Past winners ==
Year	Winner
2007	(South Africa) Jacques Janse van Rensburg
2006	(South Africa) Nolan Hoffman
2005	(South Africa) Malcolm Lange
2002	(South Africa) Nicholas White
2001	(South Africa) Nicholas White
2000	(South Africa) Nicholas White
