= Rachel Mercer =

New Zealand cyclist

Personal information
- Born: 28 March 1989 (age 37) New Zealand

Cycling career
- Sport: Cycling
- Discipline: Road cycling

Professional teams
- 2008: Team Swift Racing
- 2009: Hitec Products UCK

Rachel Mercer (born 28 March 1989) was a road cyclist from New Zealand. She represented her nation at the 2009 UCI Road World Championships. She was 2nd at the New Zealand National Time Trial Championships in 2008.
