= Michael Vink =

New Zealand road bicycle racer

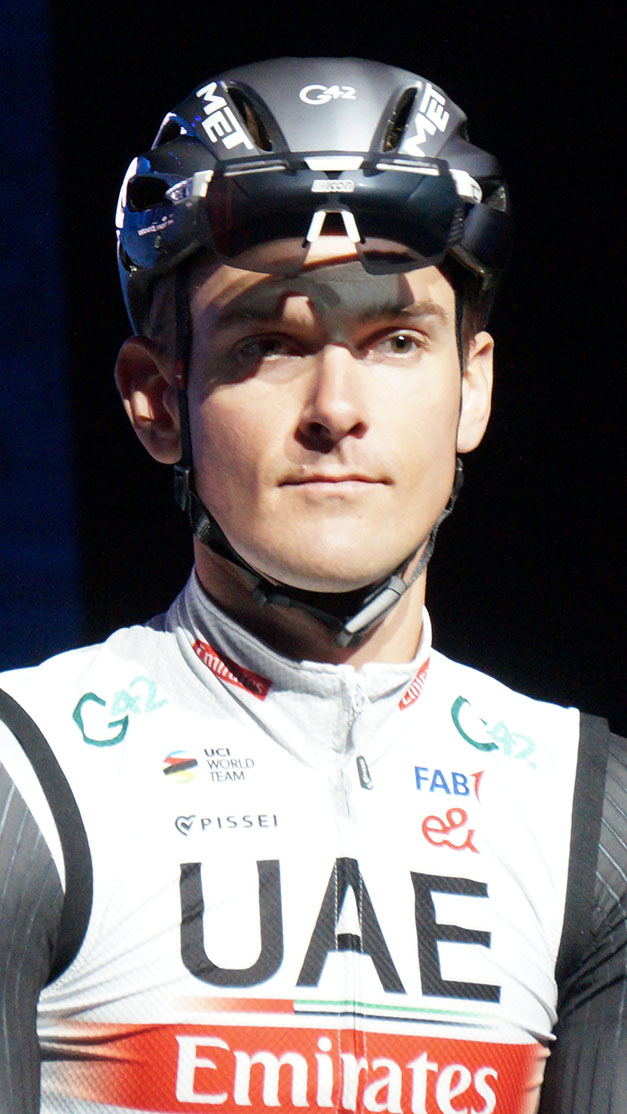
- Vink in 2023

Personal information
- Full name: Michael Vink
- Nickname: Vinkinator
- Born: 22 November 1991 (age 34) Christchurch, New Zealand
- Height: 1.90 m (6 ft 3 in)
- Weight: 74 kg (163 lb)

Cycling career
- Sport: Cycling
- Disciplines: Road; Track
- Role: Rider

Amateur teams
- 2009–2010: Subway-Avanti Cycling Team
- 2010: Isorex Cycling Team
- 2011: Trek–Livestrong
- 2011–2012: Mico–Protrain Cycling Team
- 2012: VL Technics–Abutriek Cycling Team
- 2012–2014: Scotty Browns–Vision Systems
- 2014: Breads of Europe–All About Plumbing Cycling Team
- 2016–2017: Sojasun Espoir ACNC

Professional teams
- 2013–2014: Team Budget Forklifts
- 2015: CCT p/b Champion System
- 2018: Brisbane Continental Cycling Team
- 2019–2021: St George Continental Cycling Team
- 2022: Bolton Equities Black Spoke Pro Cycling
- 2023–2024: UAE Team Emirates

Major wins
- Memorial Van Coningsloo (2013); Tour of Southland (2018, 2019, 2021); New Zealand Cycle Classic (2014); National Road Race Championships (2012); National Time Trial Championships (2015); Under-23 National Road Race Championships (2011, 2012); Under-23 National Time Trial Championships (2010, 2012, 2013)

Michael Vink (born 22 November 1991) is a New Zealand professional road cyclist, who last rode for UCI WorldTeam UAE Team Emirates. In 2023, he was signed by UAE Team Emirates XRG on the strength of his results in the virtual cycling platform ‘MyWhoosh’.

Vink has won the Tour of Southland three times (2018, 2019, 2021), a feat only achieved by four other riders. He said of his third win “I think we were the hot favourites from day one and to finish it off for me and for all the boys and the sponsors, it’s the best way to repay them, by taking the win,” He has also won Le Race (Christchurch to Akaroa) three times (2010, 2013 and 2021) and holds the course record. He said of his 2021 victory “Conditions were pretty good, and the record was on the cards, so I really pushed hard to get the record,”

Vink, said of joining UAE Team Emirates, at the age of 31 “I’m a guy who just loves riding my bike. I would wake up, check the weather forecast, see how I felt, and then do what I wanted. I was working on and off, a few different things all cycling-related, including in shops. I’ve got too much experience in the cycling industry to do something different.”

== Major results ==
2008
1st Time trial, National Junior Road Championships
1st Overall Yunca Junior Tour of Southland
3rd Team pursuit, UCI Juniors World Championships
2009
1st Time trial, National Junior Road Championships
National Junior Track Championships

1st Individual pursuit (national record)
1st Team pursuit (national record)

1st Overall Yunca Junior Tour of Southland
1st Graperide
1st French Under 19 selection race
1st Time trial, Te Awamutu Junior Tour
1st Time trial, Rotorua Junior Tour
Most aggressive rider, Grand prix Leclerc de Lune à Cholet
2nd Overall Vendée les 3 Rivières

1st Junior rider classification

3rd Team pursuit, Australian Youth Olympic Festival
9th Overall Tour of Southland
2010
1st Time trial, National Under-23 Road Championships
1st Overall Main Divide Cycle Race

1st Mountains classification

1st Overall Monmort Chouilly Beaunay
1st Le Race (course record)
1st Ottergem Kermesse
1st Christchurch to Hanmer (course record)
1st Christchurch Time Trial Association 16 km (course record)
2nd Gore–Invercargill
3rd Amateur race, Zierikzee
3rd Long Bays Classic
2011
National Under-23 Road Championships

1st Road race
2nd Time trial

1st Overall Tour de Taieri
3rd Le Race
2012
National Road Championships

1st Road race
1st Under-23 road race (1st overall and course record)
1st Under-23 time trial

1st Overall Tour de Vineyards

1st Young rider classification
1st Stage 2

1st Meulebeke Kermesse
1st Mountains classification Triptyque Ardennais
2nd Overall Tour de Côte-d'Or

1st Young rider classification
1st Stage 2 (TTT)

2nd Road race, Christchurch Festival of Cycling
3rd Overall Tour of Southland

1st Young rider classification
1st Stage 7 (ITT)

5th Overall New Zealand Cycle Classic
2013
National Under-23 Road Championships

1st Road race
2nd Time trial

1st Memorial Van Coningsloo
1st Main Divide Cycle Race
1st Le Race (course record)
National Track Championships

2nd Individual pursuit
3rd Team pursuit
3rd Scratch

4th Overall Tour of the Murray River
5th Overall Thüringen Rundfahrt der U23
2014
1st Overall New Zealand Cycle Classic

1st Stage 1 (ITT)

1st Graperide
1st Benchmark Homes Elite Cycling Series
2015
1st Time trial, National Road Championships
2016
2nd Overall Tour of Southland

1st Prologue (TTT), Stages 4 & 6 (ITT)

2nd La Route Bretonne
7th Overall New Zealand Cycle Classic
2017
1st Ronde du Porhoët
2nd Overall Tour of Southland

1st Stage 6 (ITT)

2018
1st Overall Tour of Southland

1st Stage 3

1st Overall The Pioneer MTB Stage Race (with Tim Rush)

1st Prologue, Stages 2, 3, 4 & 5

1st Graperide
2nd Time trial, National Road Championships
2nd Overall Tour of Tasmania

1st Stage 2

4th Overall New Zealand Cycle Classic
2019
1st Overall Tour of Southland

1st Prologue (TTT)

1st Overall The Pioneer MTB Stage Race (with Tim Rush)

1st Stages 1, 3, 4 & 5

2nd Overall Tour de Ijen
3rd Overall PRUride Philippines
5th Overall Tour of Taihu Lake
5th Overall Tour of Fuzhou
8th Overall Tour de Kumano
2020
2nd Overall Tour of Southland
2021
1st Overall Tour of Southland

1st Stages 2 & 7 (ITT, course record)

1st Le Race (course record)
National Road Championships

3rd Time trial
4th Road race

6th Overall New Zealand Cycle Classic
2022
2nd Time trial, National Road Championships
