= Graperide =

The Graperide is a cycle race held annually around Blenheim, New Zealand. First run in 2005, past winners of the race include Robin Reid and Anthony Chapman. The number of participants attempting to enter the Grape Ride has increased each year - due to the logistics of controlling such a large number of riders, the number of riders in the event was capped in 2007 and 2008.

== History ==
The Graperide was first run in 2005, attracting 699 entries (both individuals and teams were counted as a single entry). The majority of entrants rode a 101 km course, though riders who had survived cancer were entitled to ride a special 15 km loop instead. Individual entries were split up into age categories.

In 2006, various categories were added to the race. Firstly, the 101 km ride was split into two sections - an 'Elite' category, for those wishing to race for the winner's prizes on offer, and an 'Individual' category, for those wanting to ride the 101 km course but not wanting to race against the top competitive cyclists. A section was added for tandems, who rode the full 101 km course, and for penny-farthings, who rode the shortened 15 km course. The category for cancer sufferers remained, and a total of 1540 entries were received.

2007 saw additional changes. The 'Elite' categories were rebranded as the 'Speed Bunnies' categories, and the distance for the male 'Speed Bunnies' was increased to 160 km. Also, a new category was introduced known as the 'Magnum'. This involved riding the 101 km course twice, for a total of 202 km. There were a total of 2,267 entries in 2007, with the total number of persons riding capped at 2500.

2008 brought some more changes for the Grape Ride. A special category was set up for survivors of cancer that wanted to ride the full 101 km course, and a new category was set up for riders who wished to ride the 15 km course on a unicycle. A 'Shop Team' category was set up, whereby teams of three representing a business were timed based on the time of their slowest rider. A section was set up for people riding 'old clangers' - bikes that were made at least 50 years ago.

Organisers have announced that 2009 will bring additional categories - an "Ultimate" category, covering 10 laps for a total distance of 1010 km, and a section for college / high school students is under consideration.

== Course ==
The Graperide is based around the Forrest Estate winery. After lining up inside the winery's driveway, participants are released in groups of approximately 100 riders, based on the individual's estimated finishing time. After leaving the winery, riders head south briefly before curving left. Riders pass through Renwick and eventually come into the outskirts of Blenheim, before turning left onto Grove Road. Riders then head north, passing such towns as Grovetown and Spring Creek before reaching Picton. Riders take a left in Picton, travelling into Queen Charlotte Drive. After travelling through the undulating drive, riders pass through The Grove, eventually climbing the 3.4 km long Mahakipawa Hill before descending into Havelock. From there, riders head south until they reach the Forrest Estate winery again. Magnum riders do two laps of the course, while male 'Speed Bunnies' start at Picton, and do one part lap and one full lap.

The smaller 15 km course for cancer riders and unicyclists follows a loop around Renwick.
