= Le Race =

Cycling event

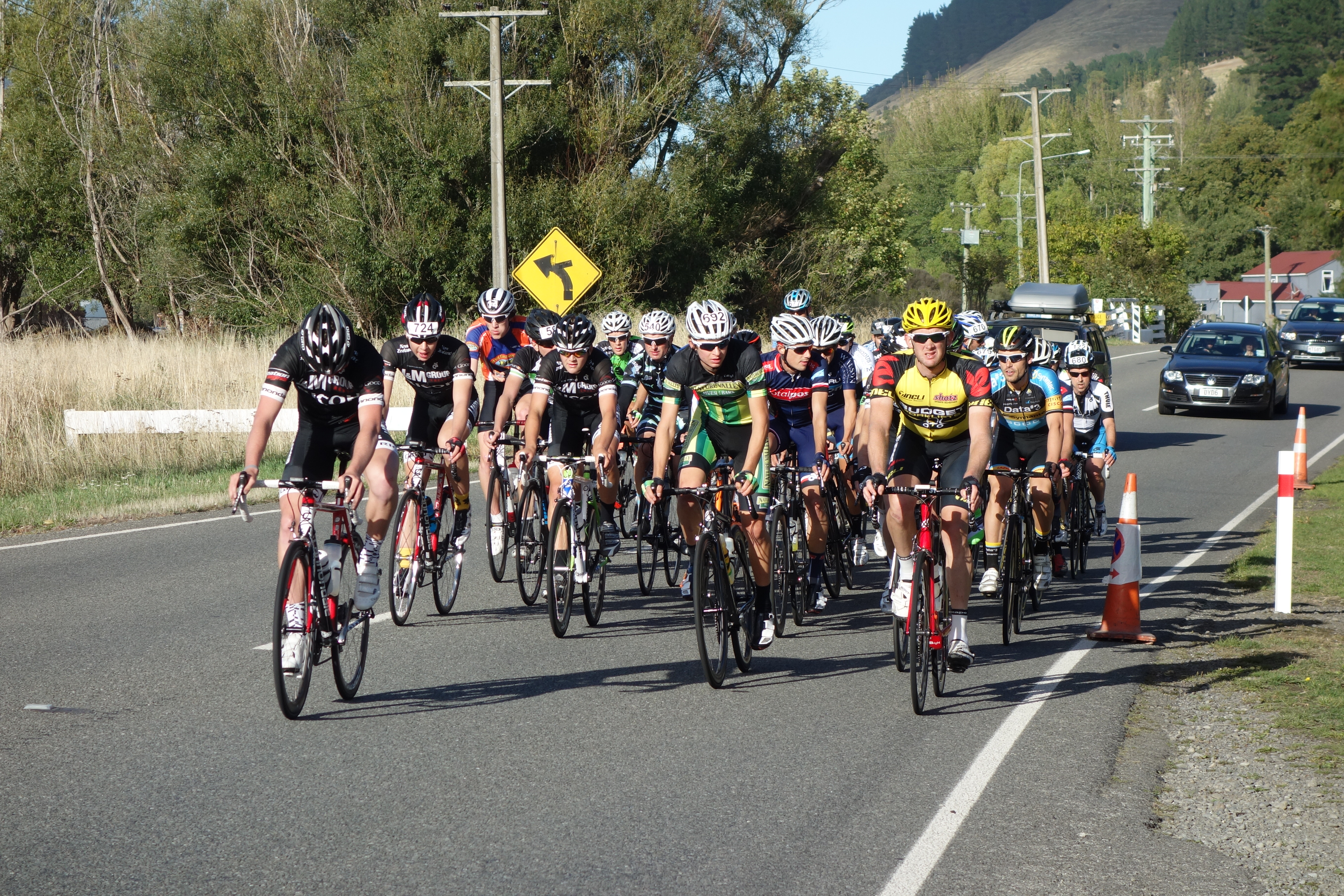
The 2014 Le Race lead group in Little River

Le Race is a road bicycle racing event held annually in Canterbury, New Zealand since 1999. The race starts in Christchurch and finishes in Akaroa, and covers a distance of 100 kilometres (62 mi).

== History ==
Le Race was first held in 1999. In the 2001 event, competitor Vanessa Caldwell died on the Summit Road in the Port Hills when she collided head-on with a car. Race organiser Astrid Anderson was charged with criminal nuisance and convicted in 2003, with a NZ$10,000 fine imposed. The conviction had a major impact on events held on New Zealand roads, with many events cancelled or postponed. The Court of Appeal overturned the conviction in September 2004, as the judge was found to have misdirected the jury. No new trial was ordered, but her conviction was quashed. Anderson's legal costs were NZ$60,000.

In 2001, Le Race was one of two events in New Zealand that had a traffic management plan, but this became compulsory following the 2001 fatality. Many club races consequently disappeared, with an underground cycling movement developing of holding unofficial races.

Anderson, the original owner of Le Race, sold the event to Simon Hollander in 2008. Hollander passed the event on to Sheree Stevens, whose first event as race director was in 2015.

Le Race traditionally started in Christchurch's Cathedral Square in March of each year. The 2011 Christchurch earthquake caused the postponement of Le Race and due to the Central City Red Zone, the 2011 event was held on 15 October and started from Elgin Street in Sydenham. After using Elgin Street as the start for four times, Le Race returned to Cathedral Square for the event held on 21 March 2015. In the 2016 event held on 20 March, a shorter option of just 53 kilometres (33 mi) that finished in Little River was also offered. Kate McIlroy won the race in 2019 and vowed that it was her last race. The 2020 race was cancelled due to the COVID-19 pandemic. In 2021, McIlroy happened to be in Christchurch and signed up on the start line, winning the race in record time.

== Multiple winners ==
=== Men's ===
Wins	Name	Years
3	(New Zealand) Mark Bailey	2003, 2004, 2006
3	(New Zealand) Michael Vink	2010, 2013, 2021
2	(New Zealand) Jeremy Yates	2008, 2009
2	(New Zealand) Daniel Whitehouse	2018, 2019

=== Women's ===
Wins	Name	Years
4	(New Zealand) Jo Buick	2001, 2002, 2003, 2010
3	(New Zealand) Reta Trotman	2011, 2012, 2014
3	(New Zealand) Sharlotte Lucas	2013, 2015, 2017
2	(New Zealand) Annalisa Farrell	2000, 2005
2	(New Zealand) Kate McIlroy	2019, 2021

== Past winners ==
Year	Men's winner	Women's winner
1999	(New Zealand) Chris Barnsley	(New Zealand) Tracy Clark
2000	(New Zealand) Ben Bright	(New Zealand) Annalisa Farrell
2001	(New Zealand) Stuart Lowe	(New Zealand) Jo Buick
2002	(New Zealand) Heath Blackgrove	(New Zealand) Jo Buick
2003	(New Zealand) Mark Bailey	(New Zealand) Jo Buick
2004	(New Zealand) Mark Bailey	(New Zealand) Michelle Kiesanowski
2005	(New Zealand) Brian Fowler	(New Zealand) Annalisa Farrell
2006	(New Zealand) Mark Bailey	(New Zealand) Josie Loane
2007	(New Zealand) Edwin Crossling	(Australia) Carla Ryan
2008	(New Zealand) Jeremy Yates	(New Zealand) Serena Sheridan
2009	(New Zealand) Jeremy Yates	(New Zealand) Simone Grounds
2010	(New Zealand) Michael Vink	(New Zealand) Jo Buick
2011	(New Zealand) Joshua Atkins	(New Zealand) Reta Trotman
2012	(New Zealand) Sam Hogan	(New Zealand) Reta Trotman
2013	(New Zealand) Michael Vink	(New Zealand) Sharlotte Lucas
2014	(New Zealand) Keagan Girdlestone	(New Zealand) Reta Trotman
2015	(New Zealand) Daniel Barry	(New Zealand) Sharlotte Lucas
2016	(New Zealand) Hayden Roulston	(New Zealand) Linda Villumsen
2017	(New Zealand) Brad Evans	(New Zealand) Sharlotte Lucas
2018	(New Zealand) Daniel Whitehouse	(New Zealand) Ella Harris
2019	(New Zealand) Daniel Whitehouse	(New Zealand) Kate McIlroy
2020	No race due to COVID-19 pandemic	
2021	(New Zealand) Michael Vink	(New Zealand) Kate McIlroy
2022	No race due to COVID-19 pandemic	
