= Samuel Horgan =

New Zealand cyclist (born 1987)

Personal information
- Full name: Samuel Horgan
- Born: 20 April 1987 (age 39) Palmerston North, New Zealand
- Height: 193 cm (6 ft 4 in)
- Weight: 82 kg (181 lb)

Cycling career
- Sport: Cycling
- Current team: Retired
- Discipline: Road
- Role: Rider
- Rider type: Time Trialist

Amateur team
- 2008: Benchmark Homes Cycling Team

Professional teams
- 2009–2012: Subway–Avanti Cycling Team
- 2013–2015: Team Budget Forklifts

Major wins
- Melbourne to Warrnambool Classic (2013); Oceania Time Trial Champion (2012)

Samuel Horgan (born 20 April 1987 in Palmerston North) is a New Zealand rower and former professional racing cyclist.

During his cycling career, Horgan was best known for winning the Melbourne to Warrnambool Classic in 2013. He also won the men's time trial at the 2012 Oceania Cycling Championships. In 2019, Horgan won the New Zealand national rowing titles in the novice coxed fours and eights.

== Major results ==
2009
3rd Time trial, Oceania Under-23 Road Championships
2011
1st Overall Benchmark Homes Tour
2012
Oceania Road Championships

1st Time trial
6th Road race

1st Overall Tour of Canterbury
1st Overall Tour de Taieri
1st Le Race
1st Taupo to Napier
2nd Time trial, National Road Championships
2013
1st Overall Benchmark Homes Elite Series
1st Overall NRS Tour of the Great South Coast
1st Overall Tour of Canterbury
1st Melbourne to Warrnambool Classic
1st Sprints classification NRS Tour de Perth
7th Overall New Zealand Cycle Classic
2014
2nd Time trial, National Road Championships
5th Time trial, Oceania Road Championships
2015
4th Road race, Oceania Road Championships
