= Subway Cycling Team =

Cycling Team in New Zealand

Team information
- UCI code: SUB
- Registered: New Zealand
- Founded: 2009
- Disbanded: 2012
- Discipline: Road
- Status: UCI Continental

Key personnel
- Team managers: Hayden Godfrey; Nigel Godfrey

Team name history
- 2009 2010 2011 2012: Subway-Avanti Cycling Team; Subway-Avanti; Subway Pro Cycling Team; Subway Cycling Team

Subway Cycling Team (UCI team code: SUB) was a New Zealand UCI Continental cycling team focusing on road bicycle racing mainly in Australia and New Zealand.

== Team Rosters ==
=== 2009 Team Roster ===
Rider	Date of birth
Jason Allen (NZL)	17 July 1981 (aged 28)
Joseph Cooper (NZL)	27 December 1985 (aged 24)
Louis Crosby (NZL)	31 December 1989 (aged 20)
Eric Drower (NZL)	27 October 1982 (aged 27)
Joshua England (NZL)	9 October 1986 (aged 23)

Rider	Date of birth
Hayden Godfrey (NZL)	15 December 1978 (aged 31)
Samuel Horgan (NZL)	20 April 1987 (aged 22)
Gordon McCauley (NZL)	9 March 1972 (aged 37)
James Williamson (NZL)	27 March 1989 (aged 20)

=== 2010 Team Roster ===
Rider	Date of birth
Jason Allen (NZL)	17 July 1981 (aged 29)
Joseph Cooper (NZL)	27 December 1985 (aged 25)
Eric Drower (NZL)	27 October 1982 (aged 28)
Joshua England (NZL)	9 October 1986 (aged 24)
Hayden Godfrey (NZL)	15 December 1978 (aged 32)
Matthew Gorter (NZL)	22 July 1985 (aged 25)
Samuel Horgan (NZL)	20 April 1987 (aged 23)

Rider	Date of birth
Nick Lovegrove (NZL)	10 October 1981 (aged 29)
Gordon McCauley (NZL)	9 March 1972 (aged 38)
Ian Smallman (NZL)	28 December 1974 (aged 36)
Michael Vink (NZL)	22 November 1991 (aged 19)
James Williamson (NZL)	27 March 1989 (aged 21)
Ryan Wills (NZL)	19 January 1988 (aged 22)

=== 2011 Team Roster ===
Rider	Date of birth
Jason Allen (NZL)	17 July 1981 (aged 30)
Dillon Bennett (NZL)	22 April 1992 (aged 19)
Hayden Godfrey (NZL)	15 December 1978 (aged 33)
Matthew Gorter (NZL)	22 July 1985 (aged 26)
Westley Gough (NZL)	4 May 1988 (aged 23)
Samuel Horgan (NZL)	20 April 1987 (aged 24)

Rider	Date of birth
Thomas Hubbard (NZL)	13 June 1991 (aged 20)
Peter Latham (NZL)	8 January 1984 (aged 27)
Nick Lovegrove (NZL)	10 October 1981 (aged 30)
Paul Odlin (NZL)	19 September 1978 (aged 33)
Ian Smallman (NZL)	28 December 1974 (aged 37)

=== 2012 Team Roster ===
Rider	Date of birth
Dillon Bennett (NZL)	22 April 1992 (aged 20)
Simon Binney (NZL)	30 September 1991 (aged 21)
Scott Creighton (NZL)	2 May 1993 (aged 19)
Matthew Gorter (NZL)	22 July 1985 (aged 27)
Westley Gough (NZL)	4 May 1988 (aged 24)

Rider	Date of birth
Samuel Horgan (NZL)	20 April 1987 (aged 25)
Peter Latham (NZL)	8 January 1984 (aged 28)
Nick Lovegrove (NZL)	10 October 1981 (aged 31)
Paul Odlin (NZL)	19 September 1978 (aged 34)
Ian Smallman (NZL)	28 December 1974 (aged 38)

== Major wins ==
2009
Stage 5 Tour of Southland, Gordon McCauley
2011
Stage 5 Tour of Wellington, Westley Gough
2012
Prologue Tour de Savoie Mont Blanc, Westley Gough

== World, Continental & National Champions ==
2010
New Zealand Time Trial Gordon McCauley
New Zealand Time Trial U23 Michael Vink
2011
New Zealand Time Trial Westley Gough
2012
New Zealand Time Trial Paul Odlin
Oceania Time Trial Samuel Horgan
Oceania Road Race Paul Odlin
