= Jeremy Yates =

New Zealand cyclist

Personal information
- Full name: Jeremy Yates
- Nickname: Mr Brown
- Born: 6 July 1982 (age 44)

Cycling career
- Sport: Cycling
- Discipline: Road
- Role: Rider

Amateur teams
- 2001: Avanti Cycles
- 2002: Zookeepers Cafe
- 2003: Quick-Step–Davitamon (stagiaire)
- 2004: Crédit Agricole (stagiaire)
- 2007–2008: Subway Cycling Team
- 2008: Yes Optus Shop

Professional teams
- 2003: QuickStep-Davitamon-Latexco
- 2009–2010: Team Enterprise NZ
- 2009: LeTua Cycling Team
- 2010: Qin Cycling Team
- 2011: Manisaspor

Major wins
- Junior World Champion Road (2000)

Jeremy Yates (born 6 July 1982) is a former New Zealand professional racing cyclist, who last rode for the Manisaspor Continental Cycling Team.

In 2004 Yates was banned for two years by the Belgian cycling federation for having an unexplained high level of testosterone. Yates had his contract with Crédit Agricole for 2005 cancelled as a result of this ban.

== Career highlights ==
1999
1st John Bull Cup
2000
1st Junior Road race, Plouay
2002
1st Stage 5 Tour of Southland, Crown Range
National Under–23 Road Championships

1st Road race

2003
1st GP Istria 4
1st in North Harbour Cycling Club Criterium (b) (NZL)
National Under–23 Road Championships

1st Road race
3rd Time trial

2nd Overall Le Transalsace International, U23
2nd Overall, Tour of Southland

1st Stage 1, 2 & 5

3rd Overall, Tour de Vineyards
2004
1st Lake Taupo Cycle Challenge
1st Stage 4 Tour de Vineyards, Richmond
1st Stage 4 Tour of Wellington, Masterton
1st Overall UAE International Emirates Post Tour

1st Stage 4

Le Triptyque des Monts et Châteaux

1st Stage 1 & 3

1st Overall Tweedaagse van de Gaverstreek
1st Stage 4 Tour de Bretagne
1st Stage 2 Tour du Tarn-et Garonne, Caussade
1st Flèche Ardennaise
3rd Romsée – Stavelot – Romsée
2007
3rd Overall Tour of Taranaki

1st Stage 3 & 5

1st Coromandel K2 Classic
1st in grade, 2nd overall Lake Taupo Cycle challenge
2nd Taupo-Napier Classic
2008
1st Overall Tour de Vineyards

2nd in Stage 2 & 3

1st Le Race
1st Coromandel K2 Classic
1st Rice Mountain Classic
1st Wanganui GP
2nd Stage 4 Benchmark Homes Tour, Kaikoura
4th Overall Tour de Langkawi
6th Overall Tour of Southland

1st Stages 2 & 6

7th Overall Herald Sun Tour
2009
1st Overall Tour de Vineyards

1st in Stage 2 & 3

1st Coromandel K2 Classic
1st Le Race
1st Stage 6 Tour of Southland
5th Overall Tour of Wellington
2010
1st Coromandel K2 Classic
1st Taupo-Napier Classic
1st Rice Mountain Classic
3rd Overall Tour of Southland

1st Stage 2 & 6

7th Overall Tour of Wellington
10th Overall Tour do Brasil

1st Stage 5

2011
National Road Championships

3rd Road race

5th Overall Tour of Isparta
7th Overall Tour of Victory

1st Stage 1

7th Overall Tour of Marmara
10th Overall International Tour of Hellas

== See also ==
- List of doping cases in cycling
