= 100 years for a million trees race =

Road cycling race in Mali

The 100 years for a million trees race was a single day road cycling race held in Mali in 2007 between the cities of Fatoma and Mopti over a distance of 60 kilometres. The race was held symbolising the start of the 100 years for a million trees project supported by professional cycling team Saunier Duval–Prodir, after the 100-year existence of the main sponsor Saunier Duval.

== History ==
Saunier Duval–Prodir, which raced the 2006 season in support of the 30 fundamental human rights around the world and their main sponsor celebrated its 100th anniversary in 2007. Saunier Duval has agreed to plant one new tree in Mali for every kilometre raced in the 2007 road cycling season, with the support of PlanèteUrgence. The country Mali is fighting desertification, which has already affected 65% surface area. The goal of the Saunier Duval–Prodir team is to cycle 1 million kilometres in 2007, resulting in 1 million new planted trees in Mali. However, for each kilometre raced in breakaway groups two trees were planted, while for each kilometre in a race where the team won, five trees were planted.

== First tree ==
The first tree was planted in Mopti after the race in January 2007 where the riders of Saunier-Duval competed with some of the best riders from Africa. In the first race, the cyclists were joined by former cyclists Eddy Merckx, Vittorio Adorni and Miguel Induráin.

During the 2007 Tour de France, already 400,000 trees had been collected. In December 2007, the 200,000th tree was planted by cyclist Leonardo Piepoli. At the end of the 2007 season, the Vuelta a España organizers joined the project, and gave a symbolic cheque of 477,238 (the kilometres that the cyclists in the 2007 Vuelta a España rode) to the organization.

The 100 years for a million trees race was won by Mali cyclist Adama Toula.
