= Main Divide Cycle Race =

The Main Divide Cycle Race is a single day road cycling race run by Pegasus Cycling Incorporated held annually in late summer (though moved to late spring for the 2019 edition) in New Zealand. Starting from Darfield on the Canterbury Plains and running for 109 km to "The Main Divide" (908m) just north of Arthurs Pass Village. Along the way there is a King/Queen of the Mountains competition at the summit of Porters Pass (942m). Total vertical ascent for the race is 1,660m.

== Past winners ==
Year	Country	Rider	Team
2003	New Zealand	Gregory Henderson	
2004	New Zealand	Ben Robson	
2005	New Zealand	Oliver Pearce	
2006	New Zealand	Scott McDonnell	
2007	New Zealand	Oliver Pearce	
2008	New Zealand	Joseph Chapman	
2009	New Zealand	Daniel Barry	
2010	New Zealand	Michael Vink	
2013	New Zealand	Michael Vink	
2014	New Zealand	Michael Vink	
2015	New Zealand	Scott Thomas	
2018	New Zealand	Sam Horgan	
