= Clinton Avery =

New Zealand cyclist (born 1987)

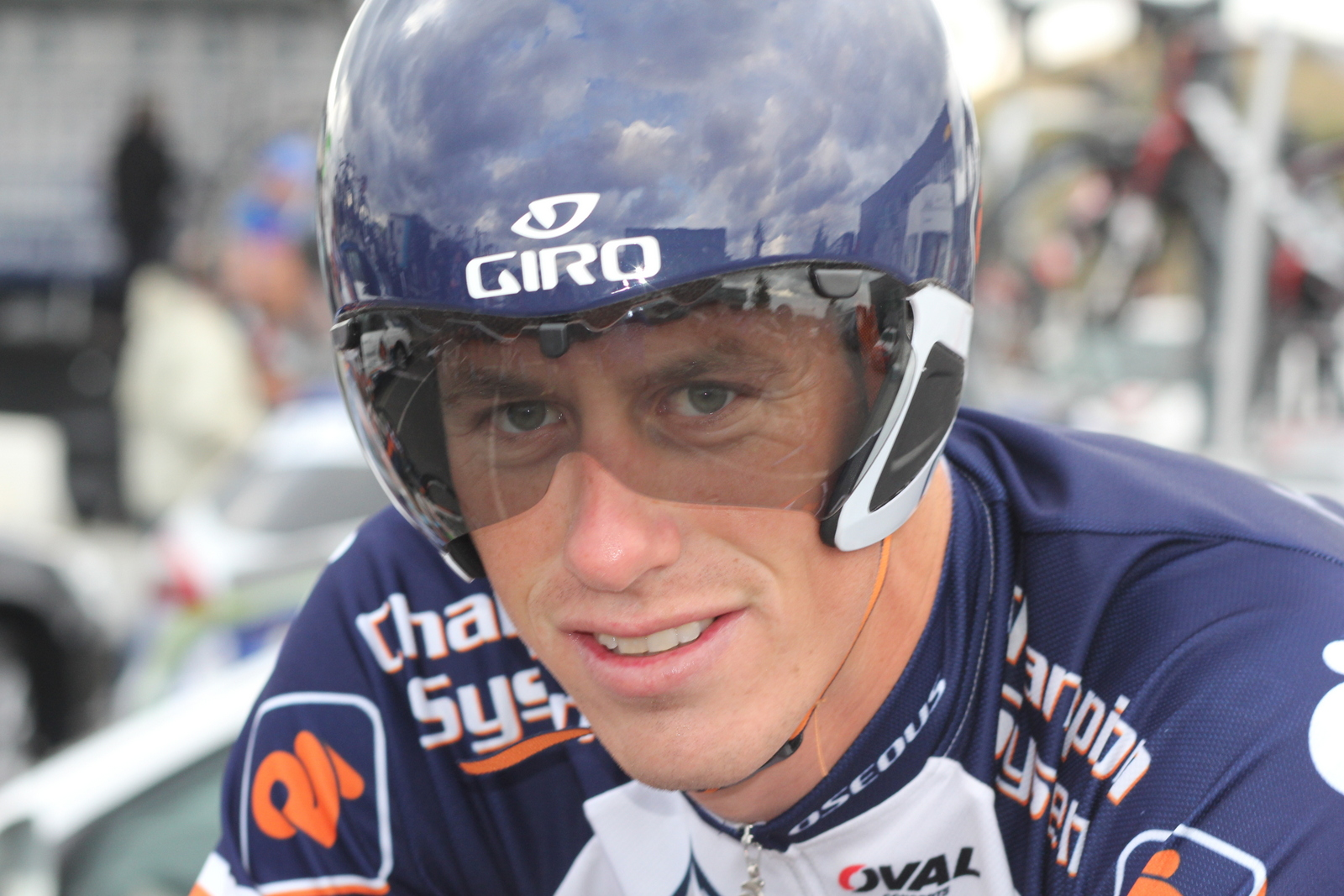
- Avery at Tour des Fjords in 2013

Personal information
- Full name: Clinton Robert Avery
- Born: 3 December 1987 (age 38) Rotorua, New Zealand
- Height: 1.95 m (6 ft 5 in)
- Weight: 90 kg (200 lb)

Cycling career
- Sport: Cycling
- Discipline: Road
- Role: Rider
- Rider type: Sprinter/Northern Classics

Amateur teams
- 2007: WC Soenens Germond
- 2008: Soenens-Yawadoo- Germond
- 2009–2010: PWS Eijssen Kempisch Cycling Team
- 2010: Team RadioShack (stagiaire)
- 2011: EFC - Quick Step

Professional team
- 2012–2013: Champion System

Clinton Robert Avery (born 3 December 1987) is a New Zealand racing cyclist, who last rode for the Champion System team.

== Career ==
Avery was the New Zealand National Mountain Bike Champion in 2007. In 2010 rode as a stagiaire for Team RadioShack, competing alongside Taylor Phinney and compatriot Jesse Sergent in the Tour of Denmark. At the end of 2010 signed a contract with the proposed Pegasus Cycling Team, but when the team collapsed Avery was left without a professional contract. Avery then spent another year racing in Belgium. At the end of the 2010/11 season he finally got the professional contract he was looking for, he signed with the new UCI Professional Continental Team, Champion System.

== Personal life ==
Avery grew up in Rotorua, New Zealand, and began riding at the age of 14. Avery attended Lynmore Primary School, Mokoia Intermediate and Rotorua Lakes High School. Avery's sister, Monique Avery was the 2009 Xterra Female Under 25 World Champion and 2007 Xterra Female Under 20 World Champion.
