= Nashua Broadband Tshwane Capital Classic =

Men's road bicycle race

The Nashua Broadband Tshwane Capital Classic, also called NBT Capital Classic or Tshwane Capital Classic is a single day men's road bicycle racing race held in South Africa, which was held for the first time in 2006.

== Past winners ==
Year	Country	Rider	Team
2006	South Africa	Alex Pavlov	
2007	South Africa	Arran Brown	
2008	South Africa	Nico Bell	
