= Paul Odlin =

New Zealand racing cyclist

Personal information
- Full name: Paul Odlin
- Born: 19 September 1978 (age 48)

Cycling career
- Sport: Cycling
- Current team: Retired
- Discipline: Road
- Role: Rider
- Rider type: Time Trialist

Amateur teams
- 2007: Petone Water
- 2008: Trek-Zookeepers Café
- 2008: The Southland Times-Trek
- 2009: Trust House Team
- 2009: Calder Stewart

Professional team
- 2011–2012: Subway Cycling Team

Major wins
- One-day races and Classics National Time Trial Championships (2012) Oceania Cycling Championships (2012) Oceania Cycling Championships (2013)
Medal record
Oceania Championships
Gold medal – first place	2012 Queenstown	Road race
Gold medal – first place	2013 Canberra	Time trial
Bronze medal – third place	2008 Invercargill	Road race

Paul Odlin (born 19 September 1978) is a New Zealand professional racing cyclist, best known for winning the 2012 New Zealand national championship in the individual time trial. Odlin currently runs the coaching business Odlin Cycle Coaching, helping New Zealand cyclists gain success.

== Major results ==
2003
9th Time trial, National Road Championships
2005
1st Stage 4 Tour de Vineyards
2007
2nd Main Divide Cycle Race
3rd Overall Tour of Canterbury

1st Stage 1

3rd Road race Oceania Cycling Championships
4th Time trial, National Road Championships
2008
1st Stage 1 Tour de Vineyards
1st Stage 5 New Zealand Cycle Classic
8th Overall Tour of Southland
National Road Championships

2nd Time trial
10th Road race

Oceania Cycling Championships

3rd Road race
4th Time trial

2009
4th Time trial, National Road Championships
2010
6th Time trial, National Road Championships
2011
6th Time trial, National Road Championships
9th Overall Tour of Southland
2012
1st Time trial, National Road Championships
Oceania Cycling Championships

1st Road race
2nd Time trial

2013
Oceania Cycling Championships

1st Time trial

1st Sprint classification New Zealand Cycle Classic
2nd Time trial, National Road Championships
2014
4th Time trial, National Road Championships
2015
7th Time trial, National Road Championships
2016
5th Time trial, National Road Championships
2017
8th Time trial, National Road Championships
2018
5th Time trial, National Road Championships
8th Overall Tour of Southland
