= Carissa Wilkes =

New Zealand cyclist

Personal information
- Born: 12 November 1986 (age 39) New Zealand

Cycling career
- Sport: Cycling
- Discipline: Road cycling

Professional team
- 2008: Team Pro Féminin Les Carroz

Carissa Wilkes (born 12 November 1986) is a road cyclist from New Zealand. She represented her nation at the 2007 UCI Road World Championships.

Wilkes has a master's degree from the University of Auckland, completed in 2014, researching the relationship between posture and depression.
