= Hayden Roulston =

New Zealand cyclist (born 1981)

Hayden Roulston MNZM
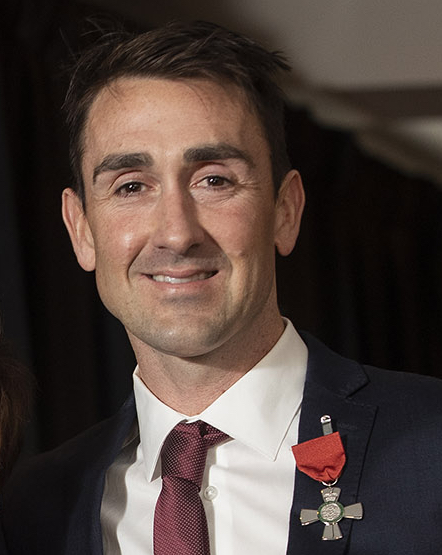
- Roulston in 2020

Personal information
- Full name: Hayden Roulston
- Born: 10 January 1981 (age 45) Ashburton, New Zealand
- Height: 1.86 m (6 ft 1 in)
- Weight: 78 kg (172 lb)

Cycling career
- Sport: Cycling
- Current team: Retired
- Disciplines: Road and track
- Role: Rider
- Rider type: Classics specialist

Professional teams
- 2002–2004: Cofidis
- 2005: Discovery Channel
- 2006: Health Net–Maxxis
- 2009: Cervélo TestTeam
- 2010–2011: Team HTC–Columbia
- 2012–2015: RadioShack–Nissan

Major wins
- Grand Tours Vuelta a España 1 TTT stage (2010) One-day races and Classics National Road Race Championships (2006, 2011, 2013, 2014)
Medal record
Representing New Zealand
Men's track cycling
Olympic Games
Silver medal – second place	2008 Beijing	Individual pursuit
Bronze medal – third place	2008 Beijing	Team pursuit
UCI Track Cycling World Championships
Silver medal – second place	2003 Stuttgart	Madison
Commonwealth Games
Bronze medal – third place	2002 Manchester	Team pursuit
Silver medal – second place	2006 Melbourne	Points race
Silver medal – second place	2010 Delhi	Road race

Hayden Roulston MNZM (born 10 January 1981) is a New Zealand former professional racing cyclist. He won the silver medal in the men's 4000 m individual pursuit and a bronze medal in the men's 4000 m team pursuit at the 2008 Summer Olympics in Beijing. He won the New Zealand road cycling championships on four occasions (2006, 2011, 2013, 2014), the Tour of Southland on three occasions (2006, 2007, 2008) and came tenth in the 2010 edition of Paris - Roubaix.

== Professional career ==
Roulston was a talented junior rider on both road and track and competed for New Zealand on the track and initially on the road for a club team in France. He turned professional with the French team Cofidis in 2002 where he remained for two seasons before moving to Discovery Channel for 2005. His season with Discovery Channel featured some impressive rides but was interrupted by injury and eventually ended when he resigned after an incident in a Christchurch bar. He attempted to relaunch his professional road career in the US when he signed for Continental Pro team Health Net–Maxxis and began strongly with two top ten stage finishes in the Tour of California beating many big name ProTour regulars. Unfortunately for Roulston his first year at HealthNet ended when a medical examination revealed irregular heart activity and he was advised to stop riding immediately.

Back home in New Zealand he experimented with some alternative remedies and was soon back riding – and winning. Without a contract but still motivated to ride he won the National Road Race title in 2006 and back to back Tour of Southland and Tour of Wellington titles in 2006 and 2007. In addition to the road races he returned to the track and won several titles at the New Zealand and Oceania track championships.

Roulston had invested a six-figure sum with a New Zealand company that failed due to the 2008 financial crisis. Roulston confided in Craig Adair, a track cycling gold medallist at the 1982 Commonwealth Games, that he was about to pull out of the preparations for the 2008 Summer Olympics, but Adair and four of his friends decided to provide finance for him during this difficult time, and Roulston continued with his preparations.

Roulston was selected for the New Zealand team to compete at the 2008 World Track Championships in Manchester where he narrowly missed medals in the 4000 m individual pursuit (4th) and Team Pursuit (4th) as well as finishing 9th in the Madison with Greg Henderson. Having performed so strongly in Manchester, he was selected for the Beijing Olympics, where he focused on improving his 4th placed pursuit rides. Former New Zealand track coach Ron Cheatley suggested his best bet will be to drop the Madison and focus on the complementary pursuit events in much the same fashion as Kiwi pursuit rider Sarah Ulmer. Ulmer quit road racing and focused solely on her pursuit preparation before the 2004 Athens Olympics where she went on to smash the world record and take the gold medal in the women's 3000 m individual pursuit.

At the 2008 Beijing Olympics, Roulston won the silver medal in the 4000 m individual pursuit, defeated in the gold medal race by Bradley Wiggins. He also featured as a member of the bronze medal-winning New Zealand team pursuit squad, although he did not race in the qualifying rounds. He came 10th in the Madison with his teammate Greg Henderson.

In September 2008, Roulston announced that he would be riding for Cervélo TestTeam in 2009, with riders including reigning Tour de France champion Carlos Sastre and multiple Tour de France stage winner Thor Hushovd.

In the 2009 Tour of California, Roulston began a perfectly executed lead out to allow team sprinter Thor Hushovd to win Stage 3. In stage 7 Roulston almost won the stage himself after breaking free from a ten-man breakaway that included Fränk Schleck, George Hincapie and Christian Vande Velde. Roulston was 2nd after a photo finish with Rinaldo Nocentini. Roulston finished 35th overall.

Roulston came fourth in the 194 km 2010 Kuurne–Brussels–Kuurne race. In the cold and windy conditions, Roulston Thor Hushovd and Jeremy Hunt chased a three man breakaway which led to Roulston finishing one minute behind the winner Bobbie Traksel.

In April 2010, Hayden Roulston came 10th in the 259 kilometre Paris-Roubaix race. He finished almost seven minutes behind the winner Fabian Cancellara. The Paris - Roubaix is one of the five "monuments" or most important races of the cycling season.

Roulston came second in the Men's road race at the 2010 Commonwealth Games, winning the silver medal. Roulston was sick leading up to the race. The 168 km race was run in very hot conditions in Delhi. He said of the race "The whole plan today was to make the race hard. We had no choice, we've got no sprinter and the world's fastest sprinters are here so for us to execute it like we did, I think the boys should be really proud".

In December 2010, Hayden Rouston won the 80 kilometre Festival of Cycling in Christchurch. Hayden Roulston spent his last few seasons riding as a key domestique for Fabian Cancellara at Trek Factory Racing.

In October 2015 Roulston announced his retirement from road racing, having previously revealed that he would make a return to the track with a view to competing in the team pursuit at the 2016 Summer Olympics.

Hayden Roulston competed in March 2016 in Le Race with the intent of obtaining a "good, intensive training ride". He won the 100 kilometre race from Cathedral Square in Christchurch to Akaroa dominating in the cross winds and forcing the pace on the climb to Hilltop. He said of the win "I haven't won for a long time so it's always nice to get the result. I wanted a hard day out and I definitely got that."

== Major results ==
2002
2nd Overall Tour of Wellington

1st Stage 2

3rd Team pursuit, Commonwealth Games
2003
1st Stage 7 Tour de Pologne
2nd Madison (with Greg Henderson), UCI Track World Championships
2nd Overall Tour de Vineyards

1st Stages 2 & 3

2004
1st Stage 1 Tour de Wallonie
1st Stage 3 Tour of Southland
2nd Tour du Doubs
3rd Road race, National Road Championships
2006
1st Road race, National Road Championships
National Track Championships

1st Individual pursuit
1st Team pursuit

1st Overall Tour of Wellington

1st Stages 3, 5 & 6

1st Overall Tour de Vineyards

1st Stages 1, 2 & 3

1st Overall Tour of Southland

1st Stage 1

1st Stage 2 McLane Pacific Classic
2nd Points race, Commonwealth Games
2007
1st Road race, Oceania Road Championships
1st Madison, Oceania Track Championships
1st Overall Tour of Wellington

1st Stages 1, 4 & 6

1st Overall Tour of Southland
1st Pegasus Subway Classic
2008
1st Overall Tour des Deux Sevres

1st Prologue

1st Overall Tour of Southland
Tour of Wellington

1st Stages 4 & 6

Olympic Games

2nd Individual pursuit
3rd Team pursuit

3rd Overall Tour de Vineyards

1st Stages 2 & 3

2009
1st Stage 1 (TTT) Tour of Southland
7th Overall Ster Elektrotoer
2010
1st Overall Tour of Southland
1st Stage 1 (TTT) Vuelta a España
1st Stage 6 Danmark Rundt
2nd Road race, Commonwealth Games
4th Kuurne–Brussels–Kuurne
10th Paris–Roubaix
1st Festival of Cycling
2011
1st Road race, National Road Championships
Tour of Southland

1st Stages 4 & 8

2013
1st Road race, National Road Championships
2014
1st Road race, National Road Championships
2016
1st Le Race
