= Serena Sheridan =

New Zealand cyclist

Personal information
- Full name: Serena Sheridan
- Born: 27 August 1985 (age 41)

Cycling career
- Sport: Cycling
- Discipline: Road
- Role: Rider

Serena Sheridan (born 27 August 1985) is a New Zealand professional racing cyclist.

== Career highlights ==
2007
1st, Overall, Tour de Vineyards

Winner Stages 2,3 & 4

2008
1st in Le Race (NZL)
1st, Overall, Tour de Vineyards

Winner Stages 1,3 & 4

1st, Coromandel K1 Elite (NZL)

2009
1st overall Tour de Vineyards

1st stage 2
2nd stages 1 & 3

2011
2nd New Zealand National Road Race Championships
