= Marble Head =

Historic house in Maryland, United States

- U.S. National Register of Historic Places
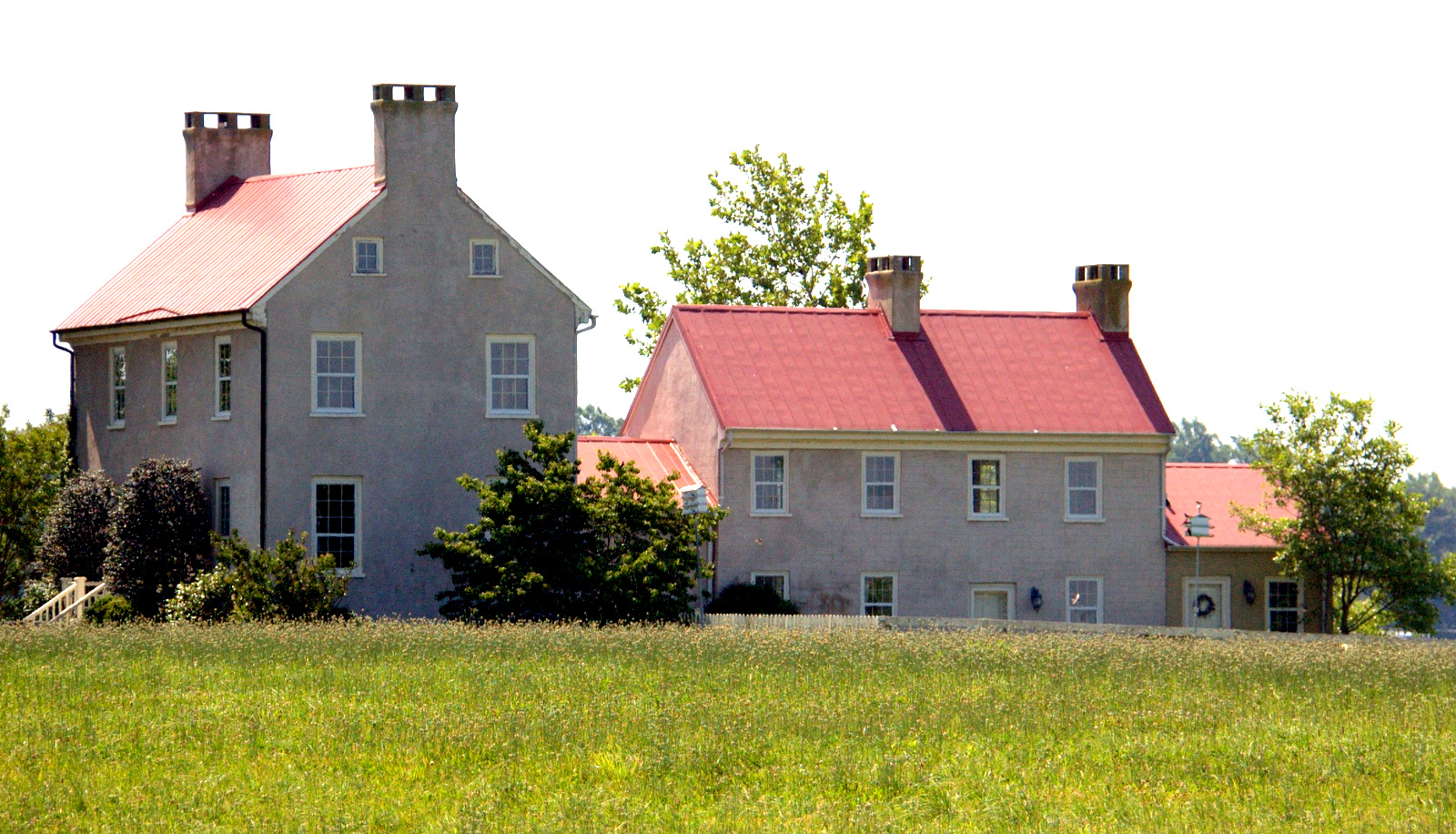

- Location within Maryland Location within the United States
- Location: 24435 Marblehead Rd. Ridgely, Maryland
- Coordinates: 38°59′21″N 75°48′18″W
- Area: 7 acres (2.8 ha)
- Built: 1803-1820
- Architectural style: Federal
- NRHP reference No.: 02001577
- Added to NRHP: December 27, 2002

Marble Head is a historic home located at Ridgely, Caroline County, Maryland, United States. It is a two-story, three-part stuccoed brick house that was apparently built in stages between 1803 and 1820. It has nearly complete interior finishes dating to the early 19th century.

Marble Head was listed on the National Register of Historic Places in 2002.
