= Tour de Vineyards =

New Zealand cycling race

The Tour de Vineyards is a road cycling race held around Tasman Bay, New Zealand. The race exists of both a men's and a women's competition over four stages. The race usually starts on New Year's Day, since the 2012–2013 edition after Christmas, ending however in the new year. Decisive is often the stage finishing on Tākaka Hill. The 2014–2015 edition was the last one after 32 years.

== Past winners ==
| Year | Men's winner | Women's winner |
|---|---|---|
| 2003 | Matthew Yates (NZL) | |
| 2005 | Heath Blackgrove (NZL) | |
| 2006 | Hayden Roulston (NZL) | |
| 2007 | Heath Blackgrove (NZL) | Serena Sheridan (NZL) |
| 2008 | Jeremy Yates (NZL) | Serena Sheridan (NZL) |
| 2009 | Jeremy Yates (NZL) | Serena Sheridan (NZL) |
| 2010 | Hayden Roulston (NZL) | |
| 2011 | Andy Hagan (NZL) | Teresa Adams (NZL) |
| 2012 | Patrick Bevin (NZL) | |
| 2013 | Michael Vink (NZL) | Linda Villumsen (NZL) |
| 2014 | Ryan Wills (NZL) | |
| 2015 | Patrick Bevin (NZL) | Jaime Nielsen (NZL) |
