= Heath Blackgrove =

New Zealand cyclist (born 1980)

Personal information
- Born: 5 December 1980 (age 45) Oamaru, New Zealand
- Height: 5 ft 10 in (178 cm)
- Weight: 143 lb (65 kg)

Cycling career
- Sport: Cycling
- Current team: Elevate–Webiplex Pro Cycling
- Discipline: Road
- Role: Rider (retired); Directeur sportif
- Rider type: All-rounder; Time trialist

Amateur teams
- 2003–2004: Beveren 2000
- 2009–2010: Hotel San José
- 2011–2013: Elbowz Racing
- 2014: Boneshaker D1 Racing
- 2015: Elevate Cycling Team
- 2017–2019: Elevate–KHS elite

Professional teams
- 2005: Jartazi Granville Team
- 2006–2008: Toyota–United
- 2016: Elevate Pro Cycling–Bicycle World

Managerial team
- 2016–: Elevate Pro Cycling–Bicycle World

Heath Denyer Murray Blackgrove (born 5 December 1980 in Oamaru) is a New Zealand former professional racing cyclist, who currently works as a directeur sportif for UCI Continental team Elevate–Webiplex Pro Cycling.

== Major results ==
1999
1st Time trial, National Under-23 Road Championships
2000
2nd Le Race
2001
1st Time trial, National Under-23 Road Championships
2002
1st Le Race
3rd Overall Tour of Southland
2003
1st Team pursuit, UCI Track Cycling World Cup Classics, Sydney
National Road Championships

1st Road race
2nd Time trial

1st Stage 1 Tour of Southland
7th Omloop van het Houtland
2004
National Road Championships

1st Road race
1st Time trial

1st Overall Tour de Vineyards

1st Stage 2

2nd Overall UAE International Emirates Post Tour

1st Prologue

2nd Challenge de Hesbaye
3rd Archer Grand Prix
10th Overall Tour of Wellington

1st Stage 1 (TTT)

10th Overall Circuit des Ardennes
2005
1st Overall Tour de Vineyards

1st Stages 2 & 3

1st Gistel
2nd Overall Le Triptyque des Monts et Châteaux
2nd Chantonnay
2nd Grand Prix Criquielion
2nd Tour du Jura
2006
National Track Championships

1st Team pursuit
3rd Madison

1st Overall San Dimas Stage Race
1st Overall Vuelta a Valencia Stage Race

1st Stage 2

1st Central Valley Classic TT
1st Stage 1 Central Valley Classic
2nd Overall Tour de Vineyards

1st Stage 4

2nd Overall Fitchburg Longsjo Classic
2007
1st Overall Tour de Vineyards

1st Stages 3 & 4

1st Stage 6 Mount Hood Classic
2nd Road race, National Road Championships
2008
1st Overall Tobago Cycling Classic

1st Stage 3

1st Tx Tough Grand Prix
2nd Road race, National Road Championships
2nd Overall Tour de Vineyards
3rd Overall Tour of Southland

1st Prologue (TTT)

2009
1st Overall Tour of Southland
1st Athens Twilight Criterium
1st Tx Tough Grand Prix II
1st Stage 1 La Primavera at Lago Vista
2010
4th Road race, National Road Championships
4th Overall Tour of Wellington
2011
1st Stage 2 La Primavera at Lago Vista
2012
5th Bucks County Classic
2013
1st Stage 1 La Primavera at Lago Vista
2014
1st Rouge Roubaix
1st Stage 2 Hotter'N Hell Hundred
1st Stages 1 & 2 La Primavera at Lago Vista
2015
1st Overall Valley of the Sun Stage Race
1st Stage 2 La Primavera at Lago Vista
8th The Reading 120
2017
1st Stage 2 La Primavera at Lago Vista
