= New Zealand National Road Race Championships =

National road cycling championship in New Zealand

The champion's jersey

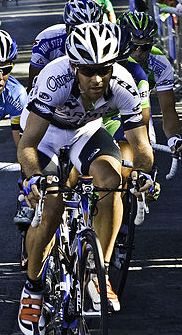
Julian Dean wearing the champion jersey

The New Zealand National Road Race Championship is a road bicycle race that takes place inside the New Zealand National Cycling Championship, and decides the best cyclist in this type of race. The first edition took place in 1934. The first winner was Frank Grose. The record for the most wins in the men's championship is held by Gordon McCauley with 5. The current champion is Paul Wright. The women's record is held by Rushlee Buchanan and with 4 wins. The U23 and elite race together in a combined race where the first across the line is the national champion. In 2019 James Fouché was the first to cross the line however being an U23 meant he was the outright national champion the same also occurred for Georgia Christie.

== Multiple winners ==
=== Men ===
Wins	Name	Years
5	Gordon McCauley	1997, 2001, 2002, 2005, 2009
4	Nick Carter	1945, 1946, 1947, 1949
4	Jack Swart	1978, 1979, 1981, 1984
4	Hayden Roulston	2006, 2011, 2013, 2014
3	Lance Payne	1952, 1954, 1958
3	Vern Hanaray	1971, 1973, 1977
2	Brian Fowler	1988, 1989
2	Glen Mitchell	1998, 1999
2	Heath Blackgrove	2003, 2004
2	Julian Dean	2007, 2008
2	Joseph Cooper	2015, 2017
2	Jason Christie	2016, 2018
2	James Fouché	2019, 2022
2	George Bennett	2021, 2026

=== Women ===
Wins	Name	Years
4	Rushlee Buchanan	2010, 2014, 2016, 2017
3	Melissa Holt	2001, 2008, 2009
3	Catherine Cheatley	2004, 2006, 2011
2	M. McDonald	1982, 1983
2	Rebecca Bailey	1993, 1994
2	Annaliisa Farrell	1999, 2002
2	Georgia Williams	2018, 2021
2	Ally Wollaston	2022, 2023

== Men ==
=== Elite ===
New Zealand National Road Race Championships – Men's elite race
Race details
- Region: New Zealand
- Discipline: Road bicycle racing
- Type: One-day

History
- First edition: 1934
- First winner: Frank Grose
- Most wins: Gordon McCauley (5 wins)
- Most recent: Aaron Gate

Year	Gold	Silver	Bronze
1934	Frank Grose		
1935	Ronald Triner		
1936	Graham Hughes		
1937	John Brown		
1938	Charles Hanson		
1939–1944	not held		
1945	Nick Carter		
1946	Nick Carter		
1947	Nick Carter		
1948	Mick Mobberley		
1949	Nick Carter		
1950	Ted Lambert		
1951	A. Sweeney		
1952	Lance Payne		
1953	Neil Geraghty		
1954	Lance Payne		
1955	Geoff Lankow		
1956	L. Parris		
1957	Dick Johnstone		
1958	Lance Payne		
1959	A. Ganderton		
1960	R. Peoples		
1961	Richie Thomson		
1962	Laurie Byers		
1963	Tony Ineson		
1964	G. Grey		
1965	Tino Tabak		
1966	G. Hill		
1967	John Dean		
1968	Merv Davis		
1969	Bruce Biddle		
1970	Neil Lyster		
1971	Vern Hanaray		
1972	L. Cooper		
1973	Vern Hanaray		
1974	J. Ryder		
1975	P. Neale		
1976	Blair Stockwell		
1977	Vern Hanaray		
1978	Jack Swart		
1979	Jack Swart		
1980	Roger Sumich		
1981	Jack Swart		
1982	Stephen Cox		
1983	Eric O'Brien		
1984	Jack Swart		
1985	Paul Medhurst	Peter Cox	Karl Stratton
1986	Bruce Storrie		
1987	Graeme Miller	Brian Fowler	
1988	Brian Fowler		
1989	Brian Fowler		
1990	Craig Connell		
1991	Chris Nicholson		
1992	Dean Peterkin		
1993	Darien Rush		
1994	Ewan McMaster	Brian Fowler	Richard Reid
1995	Norman Shattock	Glenn McLeay	Mark Rendell
1996	Robin Reid	Gordon McCauley	Mark Rendell
1997	Gordon McCauley	Brian Fowler	Stuart Lowe
1998	Glen Mitchell	David Lee	John Hume
1999	Glen Mitchell	Graeme Miller	Francis De Jager
2000	Glen Thomson	Greg Henderson	Tim Carswell
2001	Gordon McCauley	Stuart Lowe	Brendon Vesty
2002	Gordon McCauley	Hayden Godfrey	Glen Mitchell
2003	Heath Blackgrove	Glen Mitchell	Robin Reid
2004	Heath Blackgrove	Justin Kerr	Hayden Roulston
2005	Gordon McCauley	Glen Mitchell	Hayden Godfrey
2006	Hayden Roulston	Hayden Godfrey	Robin Reid
2007	Julian Dean	Heath Blackgrove	Gordon McCauley
2008	Julian Dean	Heath Blackgrove	Scott Lyttle
2009	Gordon McCauley	Joseph Cooper	Jason Allen
2010	Jack Bauer	Hayden Roulston	Julian Dean
2011	Hayden Roulston	Greg Henderson	Jeremy Yates
2012	Michael Vink	James Williamson	Patrick Bevin
2013	Hayden Roulston	George Bennett	James Oram
2014	Hayden Roulston	Jack Bauer	Tom Davison
2015	Joseph Cooper	Tom Davison	Jason Christie
2016	Jason Christie	Dion Smith	Hamish Schreurs
2017	Joseph Cooper	Jason Christie	Dion Smith
2018	Jason Christie	Hayden McCormick	Michael Torckler
2019	James Fouché	Kees Duyvesteyn	Tom Scully
2020	Shane Archbold	George Bennett	Dylan Kennett
2021	George Bennett	Michael Torckler	Ryan Christensen
2022	James Fouché	Thomas Sexton	Laurence Pithie
2023	James Oram	Ryan Christensen	Logan Currie
2024	Aaron Gate	Corbin Strong	Laurence Pithie
2025	Paul Wright	Ben Oliver	George Bennett
2026	George Bennett	Josh Burnett	Matthew Wilson

=== U23 ===
New Zealand National Road Race Championships – Men's U23 race
Race details
- Region: New Zealand
- Discipline: Road bicycle racing
- Type: One-day

History
- First edition: 1997
- First winner: Karl Murray
- Most wins: Jeremy Yates; Michael Vink; Hamish Schreurs; James Fouché (2 wins)
- Most recent: Marshall Erwood

Year	Gold	Silver	Bronze
1997	Karl Murray	Adrian Horn	
1998	Karl Moore		
1999	G. Westoby		
2000	Jeremy Robinson		
2001	Karl Moore		
2002	Jeremy Yates	Jason Allen	
2003	Jeremy Yates	Peter Latham	Timothy Gudsell
2004	Peter Latham	Timothy Gudsell	Ben Robson
2005	Logan Hutchings	Ashley Whitehead	Adam Coker
2006	Joseph Cooper	Matthew Haydock	Clinton Avery
2007	Matthew Haydock	Oliver Pearce	Edwin Crossling
2008	Clinton Avery	Westley Gough	Matthew Haydock
2009	James Williamson	Michael Torckler	Roman Van Uden
2010	Tom Findlay	James Williamson	Matt Marshall
2011	Michael Vink	James Williamson	James McCoy
2012	Michael Vink	Patrick Bevin	Joshua Atkins
2013	James Oram	Michael Vink	Alex Frame
2014	Hayden McCormick	Dion Smith	James Oram
2015	Hamish Schreurs	Dion Smith	Hayden McCormick
2016	Hamish Schreurs	Hayden McCormick	Liam Aitcheson
2017	Regan Gough	James Fouché	Jake Marryatt
2018	James Fouché	Ryan Christensen	Sam Dobbs
2019	James Fouché	Kees Duyvesteyn	Joel Yates
2020	Finn Fisher-Black	Connor Brown	Andrew Bidwell
2021	Jack Drage	Keegan Hornblow	Reuben Thompson
2022	Laurence Pithie	Keegan Hornblow	Alexander White
2023	Logan Currie	Reuben Thompson	Oliver Grave
2024	Marshall Erwood	Lucas Murphy	Lewis Bower

== Women ==
=== Elite ===
New Zealand National Road Race Championships – Women's elite race
Race details
- Region: New Zealand
- Discipline: Road bicycle racing
- Type: One-day

History
- First edition: 1981
- First winner: D. Zanders
- Most wins: Rushlee Buchanan (4 wins)
- Most recent: Kim Cadzow

Year	Gold	Silver	Bronze
1981	Debbie Zanders	Beverley May	
1982	M. McDonald		
1983	M. McDonald		
1984	K. Erikson		
1985	H. O'Connell		
1986	Sue Golder		
1987	Sally Fraser		
1988	S. Holland		
1989	Madonna Harris		
1990	Karen Holliday		
1991	Joann Burke	Jacqui Nelson	Kathy Lynch
1992	Rosalind Reekie-May	Susy Pryde	Leslie Dove
1993	Rebecca Bailey		
1994	Rebecca Bailey	Charlotte Cox	Tracy Clark
1995	Tania Duff-Miller	Charlotte Cox	Jacqui Nelson
1996	Kathy Lynch	Charlotte Cox	Janet O'Hara
1997	Maria Hassan	Tracy Clark	Joanna Lawn
1998	Susy Pryde	Marguerite Ritchie	Kirsty Robb
1999	Annaliisa Farrell	Kati Läike	Natalie Beeston
2000	Fiona Ramage	Tania Duff-Miller	Melissa Holt
2001	Melissa Holt	Benita Douglas	Catherine Cardwell
2002	Annaliisa Farrell	Melissa Holt	Tammy Boyd
2003	Jo Kiesanowski	Susie Wood	Catherine Cheatley
2004	Catherine Cheatley	Tammy Boyd	Kati Läike
2005	Sarah Ulmer	Melissa Holt	Kara Northcott
2006	Catherine Cheatley	Yvette Hill-Willis	Alison Shanks
2007	Alison Shanks	Melissa Holt	Sarah Ulmer
2008	Melissa Holt	Rosara Joseph	Kaytee Boyd
2009	Melissa Holt	Karen Fulton	Tracy Clark
2010	Rushlee Buchanan	Linda Villumsen	Kaytee Boyd
2011	Catherine Cheatley	Serena Sheridan	Rushlee Buchanan
2012	Nicky Samuels	Courteney Lowe	Kate McIlroy
2013	Courteney Lowe	Georgia Williams	Jo Kiesanowski
2014	Rushlee Buchanan	Linda Villumsen	Reta Trotman
2015	Linda Villumsen	Sharlotte Lucas	Karen Fulton
2016	Rushlee Buchanan	Georgia Williams	Joanne Kiesanowski
2017	Rushlee Buchanan	Georgia Williams	Kate McIlroy
2018	Georgia Williams	Sharlotte Lucas	Kirsty McCallum
2019	Holly Edmondston (Note: Christie won the combined race so was crowned the National champion)	Sharlotte Lucas	Georgia Williams
2020	Niamh Fisher-Black (Note: Fisher-Black won the combined race so was crowned the National champion)	Ella Harris	Teresa Adam
2021	Georgia Williams	Kate Mccarthy	Sharlotte Lucas
2022	Olivia Ray	Ally Wollaston	Georgia Williams
2023	Ally Wollaston	Georgia Williams	Sharlotte Lucas
2024	Ella Wyllie	Kim Cadzow	Samara Maxwell
2025	Kim Cadzow	Niamh Fisher-Black	Kate McCarthy
2026	Ally Wollaston	Mikayla Harvey	Kate McCarthy

=== U23 ===
New Zealand National Road Race Championships – Women's U23 race
Race details
- Region: New Zealand
- Discipline: Road bicycle racing
- Type: One-day

History
- First edition: 2017
- First winner: Amanda Jamieson
- Most wins: Ally Wollaston
- Most recent: Ella Wyllie

Year	Gold	Silver	Bronze
2017	Amanda Jamieson	Michaela Drummond	Lydia Rippon
2018	Grace Anderson	Deborah Paine	Lydia Rippon
2019	Georgia Christie	Deborah Paine	Michaela Drummond
2020	Niamh Fisher-Black	Ella Harris	Ally Wollaston
2021	Georgia Danford	Henrietta Christie	Annamarie Lipp
2022	Ally Wollaston	Henrietta Christie	Kim Cadzow
2023	Ally Wollaston	Ella Wyllie	Belle Judd
2024	Ella Wyllie	Brea Roderick	Muireann Green
2025	Rhylee Akeroyd	Kirsty Watts	Ava Maddison
