= 2007 Tour of Wellington =

The 2007 Tour of Wellington or 2007 Trust House Classic was held from 24 to 28 January 2007 in New Zealand. It is a multiple stage road cycling race that takes place over seven stages with a total of 499.3 kilometres and is part of the 2006-2007 UCI Oceania Tour.

== Men's stage summary ==
Stage	Date	Start	Finish	Distance	Stage Top 3	Leading Top 3	Time
1	24 January	Avalon	Lower Hutt	7 km	Trek Zookeepers Cafe; Savings & Loans Team Australia; Team Subway	(New Zealand) Sam Bewley (New Zealand) Hayden Roulston (New Zealand) Gordon McCauley	9.12 + 0.00 + 0.00
2	25 January	Featherstone	Masterton	117 km	(New Zealand) Gordon McCauley (Australia) David Pell (New Zealand) Hayden Godfrey	(New Zealand) Gordon McCauley (Australia) David Pell (New Zealand) Hayden Godfrey	2:44.19 + 0.22 + 1.05
3	25 January	Masterton	Masterton	40 km	(New Zealand) Mark Langlands (New Zealand) Gordon McCauley (New Zealand) Josh England	(New Zealand) Gordon McCauley (Australia) David Pell (New Zealand) Hayden Godfrey	3:49.56 + 0.26 + 1.09
4	26 January	Masterton	Masterton	158 km	(New Zealand) Hayden Roulston (New Zealand) Marc Ryan (United Kingdom) Matthew Talbot	(New Zealand) Hayden Roulston (Australia) Craig McCartney (United Kingdom) Matthew Talbot	7:39.01 + 0.04 + 0.33
5	27 January	Masterton	Admiral Hill	125.3 km	(Australia) David Pell (Australia) Josh Wilson (New Zealand) Hayden Roulston	(New Zealand) Hayden Roulston (Australia) Craig McCartney (United Kingdom) Matthew Talbot	10:53.02 + 0.55 + 2.43
6	28 January	Scorching Bay	Wellington	12 km	(New Zealand) Hayden Roulston (Australia) David Pell (New Zealand) Gordon McCauley	(New Zealand) Hayden Roulston (Australia) Craig McCartney (United Kingdom) Matthew Talbot	11:08.39 + 1.56 + 3.28
7	28 January	Petone	Petone	40 km	(New Zealand) Gordon McCauley (New Zealand) Jeremy Vennell (New Zealand) Brendon Sharratt	(New Zealand) Hayden Roulston (Australia) Craig McCartney (United Kingdom) Matthew Talbot	12:13.42 + 1.56 + 3.28

== Other leading top threes ==
Stage	Mountains	Pts	Sprint	Pts
1	none	0	none	0
2	none	0	none	0
3	(Australia) David Pell (New Zealand) Hayden Godfrey (New Zealand) Edwin Crossling	6; 4; 2	(New Zealand) Hayden Roulston (Australia) Richie Porte (New Zealand) Hayden Godfrey	5; 5; 5
4	(New Zealand) Logan Hutchings (New Zealand) Robin Reid (Australia) David Pell	12; 8; 6	(Australia) Brett Aitken (New Zealand) Hayden Godfrey (New Zealand) Hayden Roulston	8; 7; 5
5	(Australia) David Pell (New Zealand) Logan Hutchings (New Zealand) Hayden Roulston	28; 14; 10	(Australia) Brett Aitken (New Zealand) Hayden Godfrey (New Zealand) Hayden Roulston	9; 7; 5
6	(Australia) David Pell (New Zealand) Logan Hutchings (New Zealand) Hayden Roulston	28; 14; 10	(Australia) Brett Aitken (New Zealand) Hayden Godfrey (New Zealand) Hayden Roulston	9; 7; 5
7	(Australia) David Pell (New Zealand) Logan Hutchings (New Zealand) Hayden Roulston	28; 14; 10	(Australia) Brett Aitken (New Zealand) Hayden Godfrey (New Zealand) Hayden Roulston	9; 7; 5

=== Men's top 10 overall ===
Pos	Rider	Time
1	(New Zealand) Hayden Roulston	12:13.43
2	(Australia) Craig McCartney	+ 1.56
3	(United Kingdom) Matthew Talbot	+ 3.28
4	(Australia) Josh Wilson	+ 4.35
5	(New Zealand) Robin Reid	+ 5.05
6	(New Zealand) Scott Lyttle	+ 5.17
7	(Australia) David Pell	+ 11.35
8	(New Zealand) Gordon McCauley	+ 11.50
9	(New Zealand) Matt Sillars	+ 13.09
10	(New Zealand) Brendon Sharratt	+ 14.07
