= Hotter'N Hell Hundred =

Annual bicycle ride

Coordinates: 33.9182°N 98.4972°W

Race details
- Date: August
- Region: Wichita Falls, Texas
- Discipline: Road
- Competition: National calendar
- Type: One-day race

History
- First edition: 1984
- Editions: 41 (as of 2023)
- Most recent: Dušan Kalaba (SRB)

The Hotter'N Hell Hundred is an annual bicycle race in Wichita Falls, Texas. It is held each year on the 4th or 5th Saturday in August (always nine days before Labor Day) and includes professional as well as amateur riders. The professional racers ride a 100-mile road race, as well as time trials and criterium. For the amateur riders, there are road routes of 100 mi, 100 km, 50 mi, 25 mi, and 10 km. The amateur routes are also open for inline skating. Approximately 10,000 to 14,000 riders participate each year, making the Hotter'N Hell Hundred the largest sanctioned century bicycle ride in the U.S. 2009's Hotter'N Hell had over 14,000 riders.

The race was first held in 1982 as part of the Wichita Falls Centennial Celebration. The name is thus a rare example of a triple entendre: one hundred miles (i.e., century) in one hundred degree Fahrenheit weather (the race is held in August, where temperatures in Wichita Falls frequently reach and exceed this level by noon), initially conducted to celebrate the city's 100th anniversary.

The race begins at 7:05 am. Participants in the 100 mile route must reach "Hell's Gate" at the 60 mile mark no later than 12:30 pm or else cannot qualify to finish the 100 mile segment, instead doing a shorter route. Averaging 20 miles an hour it is possible to complete the ride in five hours or less for well-prepared athletes, however most complete in six to nine hours.

Additional events are held throughout the weekend including mountain bike races.

== Winners ==
Year	Winner	Second	Third
1992	(United States) Roy Knickman		
1993	(United States) Roy Knickman		
1994	(United Kingdom) David Mann		
1995	(United States) Kent Bostick	(United States) Colby Pearce	(United States) Jorge Espinosa
1996	(United States) Kent Bostick		
1997	(Canada) Eric Wohlberg	(United States) Colby Pearce	(United States) Olin Bakke
1998	(New Zealand) Julian Dean	(Canada) Eric Wohlberg	(United States) David Clinger
1999	(Canada) Eric Wohlberg	(United States) Kent Bostick	(United States) Steve Speaks
2000	(Canada) Sylvain Beauchamp	(United States) Chris Fisher	(United States) Dirk Friel
2001	(United States) Clark Sheehan	(Canada) Jesse Keefer	(United States) Dirk Friel
2007	(United States) Aaron Smathers	(United States) Edgar Ibarra	(United States) Brad Huff
2010	(New Zealand) Logan Hutchings	(United States) Joshua Carter	(United States) Russ Walker
2013	(United States) Matt Stephens	(Dominican Republic) Augusto Sánchez	(United States) David Wenger
2015	(United States) Nicholas Torraca	(United States) Jacob White	(United States) Mike Sheehan
2017	(Guatemala) Julio Padilla	(United States) Grant Koontz	(United States) Tristan Uhl
2018	(United States) Mike Sheehan	(Germany) Stefan Rothe	(Honduras) Pablo Cruz
2019	(United States) David Tolley	(United States) Tanner Ward	(United States) Kyle Swanson
2020	Cancelled		
2021	(Serbia) Pavle Kalaba	(United States) Justin McQuerry	(United States) Doug Frenchal
2022	(United States) Doug Frenchak	(Serbia) Pavle Kalaba	(United States) Eli Husted
2023	(Serbia) Dušan Kalaba	(Anguilla) Hasani Hennis	(Serbia) Pavle Kalaba
