= Mount Aspiring College =

Secondary school in Wānaka, New Zealand

- Te Kura o Tititea
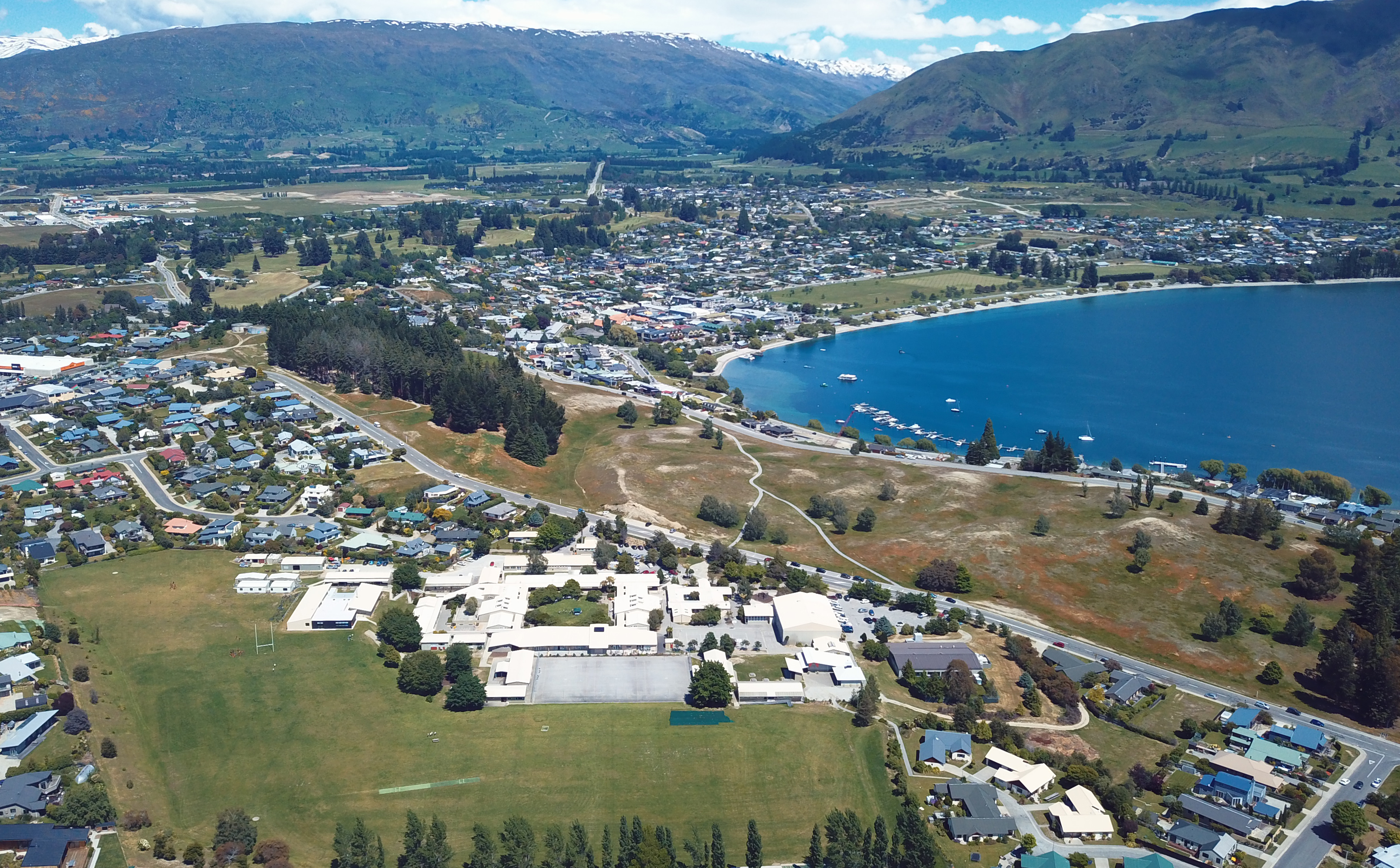

Location
- 119 Plantation Road; Wānaka 9305; New Zealand; 44.6871°S 169.1359°E

Information
- Type: State co-ed secondary (Year 7–13) with senior boarding facilities
- Motto: Enjoy Success
- Established: 1986
- Ministry of Education Institution no.: 533
- Chairman: Ian Hall
- Principal: Nicola Jacobsen
- Enrolment: 1,318 – July 2026
- Socio-economic decile: 10Z
- Website: www.mtaspiring.school.nz

Mount Aspiring College is a state co-educational secondary school in Wānaka, New Zealand. It was founded in 1986 after the division of Wānaka Area School into separate primary and secondary schools. The college, though normally a day school, operates a hostel beside the school grounds for 30 Year 13 students.

== Enrolment ==
Mount Aspiring College is naturally zoned by the school's isolation (the nearest alternative secondary school is Cromwell College, 55 kilometres away in Cromwell), therefore does not need to operate an enrolment scheme. The school's effective service area extends north to Makarora, east to Tarras and Queensberry, south to Cardrona, and west to the Southern Alps.

At the August 2015 Education Review Office (ERO) review of the school, the school had 789 students enrolled. The school roll's gender composition was 51% male and 49% female. The ethnic composition was 88% European (Pākehā), 7% Māori, 3% Asian, and 2% Other.

At the September 2019 Education Review Office (ERO) review of the school, the school had 1078 students enrolled, including 32 international students. The ERO report found

Mt Aspiring College’s performance in achieving valued outcomes for its students is: Developing.

As of July 2026, Mount Aspiring College has roll of 1,318 students, of which 157 (11.9%) identify as Māori.

As of 2026, Mount Aspiring College has an Equity Index of 412, placing it amongst schools whose students have few socioeconomic barriers to achievement (roughly equivalent to deciles 8 and 9 under the former socio-economic decile system).

== Principals ==
- 1989–1998: Michael (Mike) Allison
- 1998–2008: Maurice (Maurie) Jackways
- 2008–2020: Wayne Bosley
- 2020–2021: Dean Sheppard (acting)
- 2021–present: Nicola Jacobsen

== Hostel Program ==
The College operates a year 13 boarding programme and intakes 30 students each year, the programme is notable for its intensive outdoor pursuits program, which runs alongside daily time-tabled classes.

The Mount Aspiring College Village consists of five custom-built flats, constructed in 1996. Each flat is named after notable landmarks in the local area; Arawhata- named after Arawhata River, Avalanche- named after Avalanche Peak (New Zealand), Cascade- named after Cascade Saddle (Located in Mount Aspiring National Park), Liverpool- named after Liverpool Hut, and Rob Roy- named after Rob Roy Glacier

== Notable alumni ==
- Ellesse Andrews (born 1999), Olympic track cyclist
- Zoi Sadowski-Synnott (born 2001), Olympic snowboarder
- Campbell Wright (born 2002), Biathlon World Championships medallist
- Paul Wright (born 1998), racing cyclist and New Zealand National Road Race Champion

== See also ==
- List of schools in New Zealand
