= UCI men's road racing world ranking =

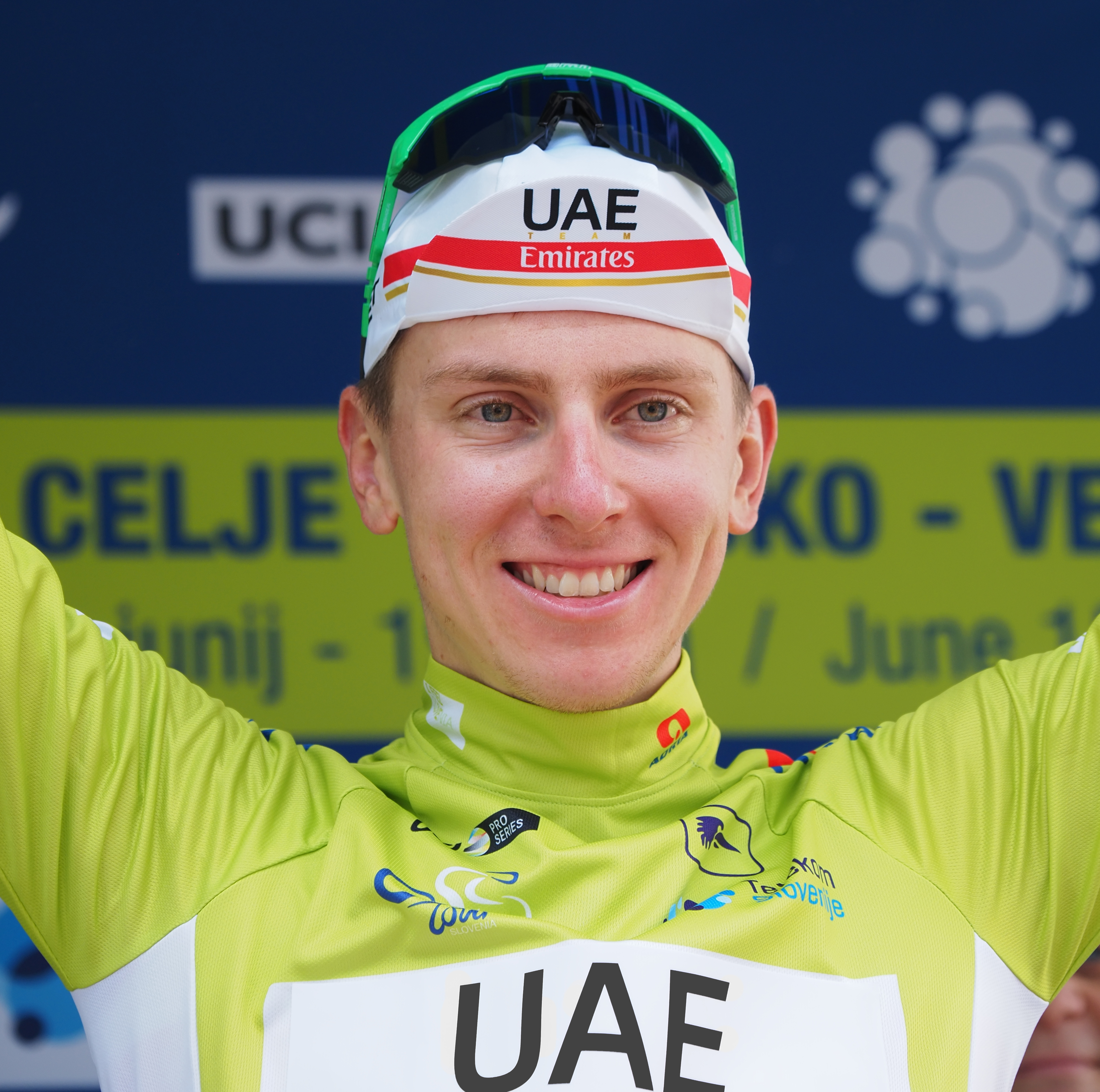
- Tadej Pogačar from UAE Team Emirates (current No.1 with record 279 weeks on top)
- Sport: Road bicycle racing
- Founded: Year-End Individual: (October 1948); Year-End Team: (1984–2018); Year-End Nation: (October 1996); Individual & Nation Weekly: (10 January 2016); Team Weekly: (13 January 2019)
- Website: uci.org

The UCI men's road racing world rankings are a points system used to rank men's road cycling riders. Points are awarded based on results in UCI sanctioned races, with points varying widely based on the importance and prestige of the race. The Tour de France grants the most points, with 1300 points going to the general classification winner.

The rankings are updated weekly, with points accrued over a rolling 52 weeks for three categories: Individual, Nations, and Teams. The Nations UCI World Ranking is based on the total points of that country's top eight-ranked riders, and the Teams UCI World Ranking is based on that team's top twenty-ranked riders. These rankings are used to determine the number of riders per country at the UCI World Championships, and which teams are allowed access to UCI WorldTour events.

The UCI also published year-end rankings for the Individual and Nations categories.

== Current ranking system ==
=== UCI World Ranking ===
On 10 January 2016, a complete new 52-week rolling basis ranking system was introduced in road cycling, incorporating both World Tour and Continental Circuit races.

Category	Summary
Individual	This ranking system is calculated on a 52-week rolling basis, rankings are updated each Tuesday. The ranking at the end of the calendar year will be utilised to award an annual winner. Unlike previous ranking systems the UCI World Classification will include all male riders from the World Tour down to U23 riders. Points will be awarded on all races from World Tour level down to 1.2 and 2.2 races.
Nations	This is based on the world ranking with the best eight riders from each country contributing towards their nation's overall score. Rankings are updated each Tuesday.
UCI WorldTour	This is the UCI WorldTour ranking of riders, teams and nations taking part in the events of the UCI WorldTour. Only riders being part of a UCI WorldTeam obtain points in UCI WorldTour races.
Continental	There will be subsets of rankings which are made up from points scored in non-World Tour races (i.e., UCI Europe Tour, UCI Asia Tour etc.) for individuals, teams and nations. This will therefore allow one rider to appear in more than one ranking, for example a rider who won Strade Bianchi and a stage in the Tour of California would be part of the Europe Tour and America Tour rankings.

== Previous year-end ranking systems ==
Throughout cycling's history, there have been many efforts to create season-long ranking systems that unify the many different races across the cycling calendar. Typically, these ranking systems were year long, with the winner being determined at the end of the season, rather than the rolling 52 week system introduced in 2016.

=== Challenge Desgrange-Colombo (1948–1958) ===
Cycling's first season-long classification system was the Challenge Desgrange-Colombo, named after the Tour de France and Giro d'Italia directors at the time. Introduced in 1948, the rankings included the Giro d'Italia, Tour de France, Vuelta a España, Milan–San Remo, Tour of Flanders, Paris–Roubaix, Liège–Bastogne–Liège, Lombardia, Paris–Tours, Paris–Brussels and Tour de Suisse.

Riders must have participated in at least one of the three races in each organizing country (Belgium, France and Italy) to appear in the top season rider final classification.

=== Super Prestige Pernod (1959–1987) ===
After the demise of the Challenge Desgrange-Colombo, French distillery Pernod sponsored a new season-long competition named the Super Prestige Pernod. It would run until 1987, when the French government placed a ban on alcohol advertisement in sport. Like its predecessor, the competition rewarded the season's best rider across both one-day and stage races.

The ranking was divided into three categories: Super Prestige Pernod (the best rider of the year), Prestige Pernod (the best French rider) and Pernod Promotion (the best French under 25).

=== FICP/UCI Road World Rankings (1984–2004) ===
The UCI Road World Rankings were based upon results from all UCI sanctioned races. It was organized by Professional Cycling Federation (FICP) from the 1984 to 1992 and by Union Cycliste Internationale (UCI) from 1993 to 2004.

=== UCI Road World Cup (1989–2004) ===
The UCI Road World Cup operated from 1984-2004, running in parallel to the UCI Road World Rankings, and was intended as a successor of the Super Prestige Pernod. It consisted of ten one-day events, including the five Monuments. Hein Verbruggen, then president of the FICP and later the UCI, introduced the World Cup to try to increase cycling's television viewership: World Cup events were required to take place on the weekend, and many took place outside of cycling's historic core of France, Belgium, Italy, and Spain.

During World Cup events, the leader of the ranking for that season wore a distinctive jersey with a vertical rainbow.

=== UCI Pro Tour (2005–2010) ===
The creation of the UCI ProTour reshaped professional cycling, as part of an attempt to standardize the cycling calendar and ensure all professional teams rode the top races. As part of this reorganization, the UCI ProTour ranking (and second-tier UCI Continental Circuits) replaced the UCI Road World Cup and UCI Road World Rankings. The new ranking included both one-day and stage races.

The ProTour rankings were replaced with a World Ranking system for 2009-2010, though this only considered a small number of ProTour and other high-prestige races, and was then merged into the WorldTour in 2011.

=== UCI World Tour (2011–2018) ===
The UCI World Tour ranking merged with ex UCI ProTour ranking in 2011, counting points for all World Tour races. It designated the best rider and best team of the season between 2009 and 2018, and the best nation of the season between 2009 and 2016.

After 2018, the World Tour ranking was superseded by the road race world rankings, which include points from all races, not just World Tour events.

== Current world rankings ==
Riders (as of 24 August 2026)
Rank	Rider	Team	Points	Prev.	Move
1	(Slovenia) Tadej Pogačar	UAE Team Emirates XRG	11321.75	1	Steady
2	(Belgium) Remco Evenepoel	Red Bull–Bora–Hansgrohe	7356.61	2	Steady
3	(Denmark) Jonas Vingegaard	Visma–Lease a Bike	6866.39	3	Steady
4	(Mexico) Isaac del Toro	UAE Team Emirates XRG	6603.46	4	Steady
5	(France) Paul Seixas	Decathlon CMA CGM	4800.71	5	Steady
6	(Belgium) Jasper Philipsen	Alpecin–Premier Tech	4532.62	6	Steady
7	(United Kingdom) Tom Pidcock	Pinarello–Q36.5 Pro Cycling Team	4365.88	7	Steady
8	(Denmark) Mattias Skjelmose	Lidl–Trek	3243.82	8	Steady
9	(France) Lenny Martinez	Team Bahrain Victorious	3087.38	9	Steady
10	(Austria) Felix Gall	Decathlon CMA CGM	3005	10	Steady

Teams (as of 21 July 2026)
Rank	Nation	Points	Prev.	Move
1	(United Arab Emirates) UAE Team Emirates XRG	17724.96	1	Steady
2	(Germany) Red Bull–Bora–Hansgrohe	14787.9	2	Steady
3	(Netherlands) Visma–Lease a Bike	13902.27	3	Steady
4	(France) Decathlon CMA CGM	13902.27	4	Steady
5	(Germany) Lidl–Trek	9834.4	5	Steady
6	(Kazakhstan) XDS Astana Team	9254.71	6	Steady
7	Team Bahrain Victorious	8884.74	7	Steady
8	(United Kingdom) INEOS Grenadiers	8361.4	8	Steady
9	(Belgium) Soudal–Quick-Step	7616	9	Steady
10	(Belgium) Alpecin–Premier Tech	7371	10	Steady

Nations (as of 21 July 2026)
Rank	Nation	Points	Prev.	Move
1	Belgium	20815.1	1	Steady
2	Denmark	18711.59	2	Steady
3	France	17061.67	3	Steady
4	Slovenia	15317.58	4	Steady
5	Italy	13974.92	5	Steady
6	(United Kingdom) Great Britain	12051.92	6	Steady
7	Australia	11001.64	8	Steady
8	Netherlands	10317.72	7	Steady
9	United States	9908.75	9	Steady
10	Spain	8380.28	10	Steady

== Ranking timeline and statistics ==
=== List of number one ranked riders ===
No.	Rider	Team	Start date	End date	Weeks	Total
1	(New Zealand) Jason Christie	Kenyan Riders Downunder	January 10, 2016	January 17, 2016	2	2
2	(Australia) Simon Gerrans	Orica–GreenEDGE	January 24, 2016	March 6, 2016	7	7
3	(Australia) Richie Porte	BMC Racing Team	March 13, 2016	March 13, 2016	1	1
4	(Belgium) Greg Van Avermaet	BMC Racing Team	March 20, 2016	March 20, 2016	1	1
5	(Slovakia) Peter Sagan	Tinkoff (2016); Bora–Hansgrohe (2017)	March 27, 2016	April 2, 2017	54	54
	(Belgium) Greg Van Avermaet (2)	BMC Racing Team	April 9, 2017	February 25, 2018	47	48
6	(United Kingdom) Chris Froome	Team Sky	March 4, 2018	April 8, 2018	6	6
	(Slovakia) Peter Sagan (2)	Bora–Hansgrohe	April 15, 2018	May 20, 2018	6	60
	(United Kingdom) Chris Froome (2)	Team Sky	May 27, 2018	July 15, 2018	8	14
	(Slovakia) Peter Sagan (3)	Bora–Hansgrohe	July 22, 2018	September 16, 2018	9	69
7	(Spain) Alejandro Valverde	Movistar Team	September 23, 2018	March 17, 2019	26	26
8	(France) Julian Alaphilippe	Deceuninck–Quick-Step	March 24, 2019	September 8, 2019	25	25
9	(Slovenia) Primož Roglič	Team Jumbo–Visma	September 15, 2019	March 17, 2020	27	27
—	UCI World Ranking frozen due to COVID-19		March 24, 2020	July 28, 2020	19	19
	(Slovenia) Primož Roglič	Team Jumbo–Visma	August 4, 2020	October 20, 2020	12	39
10	(Slovenia) Tadej Pogačar	UAE Team Emirates	October 27, 2020	November 3, 2020	2	2
	(Slovenia) Primož Roglič (2)	Team Jumbo–Visma	November 10, 2020	July 13, 2021	36	75
	(Slovenia) Tadej Pogačar (2)	UAE Team Emirates	July 20, 2021	September 7, 2021	8	10
11	(Belgium) Wout van Aert	Team Jumbo–Visma	September 14, 2021	September 21, 2021	2	2
	(Slovenia) Tadej Pogačar (3)	UAE Team Emirates	September 28, 2021	November 17, 2026	269	279

last update: 17 November 2026

=== Total weeks at No. 1 ===
Rank	Rider	Weeks
1	(Slovenia) Tadej Pogačar	279
2	(Slovenia) Primož Roglič	75
3	(Slovakia) Peter Sagan	69
4	(Belgium) Greg Van Avermaet	48
5	(Spain) Alejandro Valverde	26
6	(France) Julian Alaphilippe	25
7	(United Kingdom) Chris Froome	14
8	(Australia) Simon Gerrans	7
9	(New Zealand) Jason Christie	2
	(Belgium) Wout van Aert	2
11	(Australia) Richie Porte	1

Rank	Nation	Weeks
1	Belgium	410
2	France	78
3	Italy	37
4	Slovenia	13
5	Australia	8
6	New Zealand	2

last update: 17 November 2026

=== List of number one ranked nations ===
No.	Team	Start date	End date	Weeks	Total
1	New Zealand	January 10, 2016	January 17, 2016	2	2
2	Australia	January 24, 2016	February 28, 2016	6	6
3	Italy	March 6, 2016	March 6, 2016	1	1
	Australia (2)	March 13, 2016	March 20, 2016	2	8
4	Belgium	March 27, 2016	April 24, 2016	5	5
5	France	May 1, 2016	February 19, 2017	43	43
	Belgium (2)	February 26, 2017	March 5, 2017	2	7
	France (2)	March 12, 2017	March 19, 2017	2	45
	Belgium (3)	March 26, 2017	October 9, 2017	29	36
	Italy (2)	October 16, 2017	October 16, 2017	1	2
	Belgium (4)	October 23, 2017	January 21, 2018	14	50
	Italy (3)	January 28, 2018	January 28, 2018	1	3
	Belgium (5)	February 4, 2018	February 4, 2018	1	51
	Italy (4)	February 11, 2018	February 11, 2018	1	4
	Belgium (6)	February 18, 2018	February 18, 2019	1	52
	Italy (5)	February 25, 2018	September 2, 2018	28	32
	Belgium (7)	September 9, 2018	March 17, 2019	28	80
	France (3)	March 24, 2019	April 7, 2019	3	48
	Belgium (8)	April 14, 2019	April 28, 2019	3	83
	France (4)	May 5, 2019	May 5, 2019	1	49
	Belgium (9)	May 12, 2019	May 19, 2019	2	85
	France (5)	May 26, 2019	June 9, 2019	3	52
	Belgium (10)	June 16, 2019	June 16, 2019	1	86
	France (6)	June 23, 2019	June 23, 2019	1	53
	Belgium (11)	June 30, 2019	July 21, 2019	4	90
	France (7)	July 28, 2019	August 11, 2019	3	56
	Belgium (12)	August 18, 2019	March 17, 2020	31	121
—	Ranking frozen	March 24, 2020	July 28, 2020	19	19
	Italy (6)	August 4, 2020	August 4, 2020	1	33
	Belgium (13)	August 11, 2020	August 18, 2020	2	123
	Italy (7)	August 25, 2020	September 15, 2020	4	37
6	Slovenia	September 22, 2020	November 3, 2020	7	7
	France (8)	November 10, 2020	March 16, 2021	19	75
	Slovenia (2)	March 23, 2021	March 30, 2021	2	9
	Belgium (14)	April 6, 2021	April 6, 2021	1	124
	Slovenia (3)	April 13, 2021	April 13, 2021	1	10
	Belgium (15)	April 20, 2021	May 4, 2021	3	127
	France (9)	May 11, 2021	May 25, 2021	3	78
	Belgium (16)	June 1, 2021	March 29, 2022	44	171
	Slovenia (4)	April 5, 2022	April 19, 2022	3	13
	Belgium (17)	April 26, 2022	November 17, 2026	239	410

last update: 17 November 2026

=== Year-end UCI World Rankings ===
The following is a list of Top 3 riders, teams and nations at the end of each season:

Individual Ranking
Year	1st		2nd		3rd	
2025	(Slovenia) Tadej Pogačar; UAE Team Emirates XRG	11680 pts	(Denmark) Jonas Vingegaard; Visma–Lease a Bike	5944.14 pts	(Mexico) Isaac del Toro; UAE Team Emirates XRG	5664 pts
2024	(Slovenia) Tadej Pogačar; UAE Team Emirates	11655 pts	(Belgium) Remco Evenepoel; Soudal–Quick-Step	6072.57 pts	(Belgium) Jasper Philipsen; Alpecin–Deceuninck	4790 pts
2023	(Slovenia) Tadej Pogačar; UAE Team Emirates	7695.86 pts	(Denmark) Jonas Vingegaard; Team Jumbo–Visma	6304.07 pts	(Belgium) Remco Evenepoel; Soudal–Quick-Step	5641.71 pts
2022	(Slovenia) Tadej Pogačar; UAE Team Emirates	5131 pts	(Belgium) Wout van Aert; Team Jumbo–Visma	4525 pts	(Belgium) Remco Evenepoel; Quick-Step Alpha Vinyl Team	4402.5 pts
2021	(Slovenia) Tadej Pogačar; UAE Team Emirates	5363 pts	(Belgium) Wout van Aert; Team Jumbo–Visma	4382 pts	(Slovenia) Primož Roglič; Team Jumbo–Visma	3924 pts
2020	(Slovenia) Primož Roglič; Team Jumbo–Visma	4237 pts	(Slovenia) Tadej Pogačar; UAE Team Emirates	3055 pts	(Belgium) Wout van Aert; Team Jumbo–Visma	2700 pts
2019	(Slovenia) Primož Roglič; Team Jumbo–Visma	4705.28 pts	(France) Julian Alaphilippe; Deceuninck–Quick-Step	3569.95 pts	(Denmark) Jakob Fuglsang; Astana	3472.5 pts
2018	(Spain) Alejandro Valverde; Movistar Team	4168 pts	(United Kingdom) Simon Yates; Mitchelton–Scott	3160 pts	(Italy) Elia Viviani; Quick-Step Floors	3106 pts
2017	(Belgium) Greg Van Avermaet; BMC Racing Team	4148 pts	(United Kingdom) Chris Froome; Team Sky	3692 pts	(Slovakia) Peter Sagan; Bora–Hansgrohe	3344 pts
2016	(Slovakia) Peter Sagan; Tinkoff	5359 pts	(United Kingdom) Chris Froome; Team Sky	3771 pts	(Belgium) Greg Van Avermaet; BMC Racing Team	3711.25 pts
2011–2015 see UCI World Tour
2010	(Spain) Joaquim Rodriguez; Team Katusha	561 pts	(Belgium) Philippe Gilbert; Omega Pharma–Lotto	437 pts	(Spain) Luis León Sánchez; Caisse d'Epargne	413 pts
2009	(Spain) Alberto Contador; Astana	527 pts	(Spain) Alejandro Valverde; Caisse d'Epargne	483 pts	(Spain) Samuel Sánchez; Euskaltel–Euskadi	357 pts

Team Ranking
Year	1st		2nd		3rd	
2025	(United Arab Emirates) UAE Team Emirates XRG	40637.65 pts	(Netherlands) Visma–Lease a Bike	22876.74 pts	(United States) Lidl–Trek	21267.43 pts
2024	(United Arab Emirates) UAE Team Emirates	37407.6 pts	(Netherlands) Visma–Lease a Bike	20427.98 pts	(Belgium) Soudal–Quick-Step	18153.97 pts
2023	(United Arab Emirates) UAE Team Emirates	30170.18 pts	(Netherlands) Team Jumbo–Visma	29177.45 pts	(Belgium) Soudal–Quick-Step	18529.85 pts
2022	(Netherlands) Team Jumbo–Visma	15003.5 pts	(United Arab Emirates) UAE Team Emirates	13323 pts	(United Kingdom) INEOS Grenadiers	12494 pts
2021	(Belgium) Deceuninck–Quick-Step	15641.21 pts	(United Kingdom) INEOS Grenadiers	14998.66 pts	(Netherlands) Team Jumbo–Visma	12914.67 pts
2020	(Netherlands) Team Jumbo–Visma	9919 pts	(Belgium) Deceuninck–Quick-Step	9776.16 pts	(United Arab Emirates) UAE Team Emirates	8503 pts
2019	(Belgium) Deceuninck–Quick-Step	14835.15 pts	(Germany) Bora–Hansgrohe	14192.86 pts	(Netherlands) Team Jumbo–Visma	13128.07 pts

Nation Ranking
Year	1st		2nd		3rd	
2025	Belgium	17986.29 pts	Denmark	17191.16 pts	Slovenia	14953 pts
2024	Belgium	24499 pts	Slovenia	17941.14 pts	Spain	14583.86 pts
2023	Belgium	22800.71 pts	Denmark	18669.98 pts	Slovenia	16501.34 pts
2022	Belgium	17901.5 pts	Spain	11845.5 pts	France	11774 pts
2021	Belgium	14289.33 pts	Slovenia	11983 pts	France	11536.67 pts
2020	France	9542.83 pts	Slovenia	8824 pts	Belgium	8530 pts
2019	Belgium	13491.09 pts	Italy	11747.48 pts	Netherlands	11388.14 pts
2018	Belgium	14502.02 pts	France	13628.12 pts	Italy	12142.76 pts
2017	Belgium	14600 pts	Italy	13938 pts	France	12123 pts
2016	France	13007 pts	Belgium	12483.25 pts	Italy	11922 pts

== Explanation of the ranking points system ==
=== UCI events ===
Rules and regulations can be found here.

==== Points hierarchy for overall placings ====
	UCI WorldTour					UCI ProSeries	UCI Continental Tours		
Rank	Tour de France	Giro, Vuelta	Monu ments	Cat.4 Santos Tour Down Under, UAE Tour, Strade Bianche, Paris–Nice, Tirreno–Adriatico, In Flanders Fields – From Middelkerke to Wevelgem, Amstel Gold Race, La Flèche Wallonne, Tour Auvergne-Rhône-Alpes, Tour de Romandie, Tour de Suisse, Grand Prix Cycliste de Québec, Grand Prix Cycliste de Montréal	Cat.5 Mapei Cadel Evans Great Ocean Road Race, Omloop Het Nieuwsblad, Volta Ciclista a Catalunya, Ronde Van Brugge – Tour of Bruges, E3 Saxo Classic, Dwars door Vlaanderen – À travers la Flandre, Itzulia Basque Country, Eschborn–Frankfurt, Copenhagen Sprint, DSSK (Donostia San Sebastián Klasikoa), Tour de Pologne, Renewi Tour, ADAC Cyclassics, Bretagne Classic – CIC, Tour of Guangxi	Pro Series	1.1 2.1	1.2 2.2	1.2U 2.2U
1	1300	1100	800	500	400	250	125	40	30
2	1040	885	640	400	320	170	85	30	25
3	880	750	520	325	260	140	70	25	20
4	750	600	440	275	220	120	60	20	15
5	620	495	360	225	180	100	50	15	10
6	520	415	280	175	140	80	40	10	5
7	425	340	240	150	120	70	35	5	3
8	360	285	200	125	100	60	30	3	1
9	295	235	160	100	80	50	25	3	1
10	230	180	135	85	68	40	20	3	1
11	190	155	110	70	56	30	15		
12	165	130	95	60	48	20	10		
13	140	110	85	50	40	10	5		
14	110	90	65	40	32	10	5		
15	100	80	55	35	28	10	5		
16	90	75	50	30	24	6	3		
17	85	70	50	30	24	6	3		
18	80	60	50	30	24	6	3		
19	70	55	50	30	24	6	3		
20	60	50	50	30	24	6	3		
21	50	50	30	20	16	6	3		
22	50	50	30	20	16	6	3		
23	50	50	30	20	16	6	3		
24	50	50	30	20	16	6	3		
25	50	50	30	20	16	6	3		
26–30	40	30	30	20	16	5			
31–40	35	25	15	10	8	3			
41–50	25	20	15	10	8				
51–55	20	15	10	5	4				
56–60	15	10	5	3	2				

==== Prologue and stage placing points hierarchy ====
	UCI WorldTour				UCI ProSeries	UCI Continental Tours		
Stage placing	Tour de France	Giro, Vuelta	Cat.4 Santos Tour Down Under, UAE Tour, Paris–Nice, Tirreno–Adriatico, Tour Auvergne-Rhône-Alpes, Tour de Romandie, Tour de Suisse	Cat.5 Volta Ciclista a Catalunya, Itzulia Basque Country, Tour de Pologne, Renewi Tour, Tour of Guangxi	Pro Series	2.1	2.2	2.2U
1	210	180	60	50	25	14	7	5
2	150	130	40	30	15	5	3	1
3	110	95	30	25	10	3	1	
4	90	80	25	20	5			
5	70	60	20	15	3			
6	55	45	15	10				
7	45	40	10	8				
8	40	35	8	6				
9	35	30	5	3				
10	30	25	2	1				
11	25	20						
12	20	15						
13	15	10						
14	10	5						
15	5	2						

==== Secondary classification (points and mountains competitions) hierarchy for final position ====
Position	Tour de France	Giro d'Italia Vuelta a España
1	210	180
2	150	130
3	110	95

==== Wearing the race leaders jersey ====
	UCI WorldTour				UCI ProSeries	UCI Continental Tours		
	Tour de France	Giro, Vuelta	Cat.4 Santos Tour Down Under, UAE Tour, Paris–Nice, Tirreno–Adriatico, Tour Auvergne-Rhône-Alpes, Tour de Romandie, Tour de Suisse	Cat.5 Volta Ciclista a Catalunya, Itzulia Basque Country, Tour de Pologne, Renewi Tour, Tour of Guangxi	Pro Series	2.1	2.2	2.2U
Points per day	25	20	10	8	5	3	1	1

=== Other events ===
==== Points for World, Olympic, Continental and National Championships ====
	World Championships & Olympic Games		U23 World Championships		Continental Championships & Continental Games		U23 Continental Championships & Continental Games		National Championships				U23 National Championships	
Rank	Road Race	Time Trial	Road Race	Time Trial	Road Race	Time Trial	Road Race	Time Trial	Road Race – A	Road Race – B	Time Trial – A	Time Trial – B	Road Race	Time Trial
1	900	455	200	125	250	70	125	50	100	50	50	25	50	25
2	715	325	150	85	200	55	85	30	75	30	30	15	30	15
3	600	260	125	70	150	40	70	20	60	20	20	10	20	10
4	490	195	100	60	125	30	60	15	50	15	15	5	15	5
5	410	165	85	50	100	25	50	10	40	10	10	3	10	3
6	340	130	70	40	90	20	40	5	30	5	5		5	
7	265	110	60	35	80	15	35	3	20	3	3		3	
8	225	90	50	30	70	10	30	3	10	3	3		3	
9	190	80	40	25	60	5	25	1	5	1	1		1	
10	150	65	35	20	50	3	20	1	3	1	1		1	
11	130	55	30	15	40		15		3					
12	105	40	25	10	35		10		1					
13	90	30	20	5	30		5		1					
14	75	25	15	5	25		5		1					
15	60	20	10	5	20		5		1					
16	50	15	5	3	15		3							
17	45	10	5	3	10		3							
18	45	10	5	3	5		3							
19	45	5	5	3	5		3							
20	45	5	5	3	5		3							
21	45	3	5		5									
22	30	3	5		5									
23	30	3	5		5									
24	30	3	5		5									
25	30	3	5		5									
26	30		5		5									
27	30		5		5									
28	30		5		5									
29	30		5		5									
30	30		5		5									
31	30		3		3									
32	15		3		3									
33	15		3		3									
34	15		3		3									
35	15		3		3									
36–40	15		3		1									
41–50	15													
51–55	10													
56–60	5													

==== Team Time Trial Championships ====
	UCI Road World Championships	Continental Championships	
Rank	Team Time Trial Mixed Relay	Team Time Trial	Team Time Trial Mixed Relay
1	300	70	70
2	250	55	55
3	200	40	40
4	150	30	30
5	125	25	25
6	100	20	20
7	85	15	15
8	75	10	10
9	60	5	5
10	50	3	3
11	40		
12	30		
13	25		
14	15		
15	10		
16–20	10		
21–25	5		

== See also ==
- UCI Women's Road World Rankings
