= Britta Martin =

German triathlete (born 1978)

Personal information
- Nickname: Flying Kiwi
- Born: 2 September 1978 (age 48) Hannover
- Height: 1.62 m (5 ft 4 in)
- Weight: 68 kg (150 lb)

Sport
- Country: Germany
- Sport: Triathlon
- Turned pro: 2008
- Coached by: John Hellemans, Andy Adair

Achievements and titles
- Personal best: 8:56:34 (2014)

Britta Martin (born 2 September 1978 in Hannover, Germany) is a German born, New Zealand based professional triathlete and multiple winner of Ironman distance races all over the world (2012, 2014).

== Career ==
Britta Martin studied sports science at the Technical University of Munich. In the beginning she has been a cyclist. In her first triathlon season 2003 she won her first two competitions in the Munich region together with Faris Al-Sultan, winner of the Ironman World Championships two years later, as the fastest man on the podium. At the German half-iron Championships 2003 in Kulmbach, Bavaria, she finished seventh in the individual standings 36 min behind the winning Nina Kraft, who reached third at the Ironman World Championships two months later. Together with her team of her Munich triathlon club MRRC she became honored as runner-up. After two years of injury without competitions Britta Martin competed together with her team from MRRC Munich in the 2006 season of the Bavarian team circuit, where they became Bavarian team champion. Constantly injured from running, Britta Martin switched into cycling in 2007 and became member of the professional female cycling team Team Stuttgart.

In 2007, she found herself racing in the Tour de Pakistan, where she met former New Zealand time trial champion and Olympic cyclist, Robin Reid. Both won the male and female sections of the event and have been together ever since. At the end of the year, she moved to her partner Robin Reid and is now living in Nelson, New Zealand. Since 2008 Britta Martin competes as a professional triathlete mainly at the Ironman distance for Nelson Triathlon Club and her main sponsor Tineli, a local manufacturer of cycle clothing.

Her victory in December at the Half-Ironman Taupo follows three months later on the same place her debut on the Ironman distance 2009 with the eighth place. One year later, same race, she is about ten minutes faster and reaches fifth place. Again three month later at the Mediterranean Sea she reaches fourth at the Ironman France, the next try at the same event one year later in 2011 then - with stress fracture in her foot during the race - third place at Ironman France in Nice. Again six months later Britta Martin is second about three minutes behind Gina Crawford at Challenge Wanaka.

2012 Britta Martin does her final jump into world class: at the ETU Long-Distance Triathlon Championships in July 2012, hosted at Challenge Roth, there were only 69 seconds missing to break the nine-hours-border, Britta Martin became fifth overall. In December 2012, she definitely came into the spotlight with her first Ironman win at Busselton, Australia. Together with finishes at Ironman Melbourne and Ironman Sweden Britta Martin is qualified for the first time to compete as a pro at the Ironman World Champion Chips in Kailua-Kona. Britta finished - however unhappy with her performance - 21st.

In April 2014, her second iron distance victory at Challenge Taiwan was a doubly emotional moment: only a few days before her father died and her mother's birthday was on the race day. In September 2014, she picked up in Wisconsin her second Ironman victory. In December 2014 Britta Martin won the Ironman Western Australia for the second time. Finishing in 8:56:34 she was the fiftieth woman in the history of the Ironman among nine hours in a race and lowered the female course record for this race. It was the fastest ever Ironman by a New Zealand woman.

In February 2015 Britta Martin celebrated her victory at the 'Marlborough Sounds Half Ironman together with her friend Robin Reid, who was fastest man in this competition. In an effort to add to her qualifying points for the Ironman World Championships 2015, Britta Martin competed at Ironman 70.3 Racine, Wisconsin in July. (Primarily her plan was to race at Ironman Korea, which had been canceled.) Due to two technical defects (punctures) on the first five kilometers of the bike leg she finished as 97th women. Nevertheless Britta Martin received just a few days later her confirmation letter, that she got her entry slot as 23rd highest ranked woman in the Kona Points Ranking System. The top 35 professional female triathletes, who earned the most points correlating to their finish positions in Ironman competitions all over the world between August, 31st and July, 31st are qualified to race the Ironman World Championships in October, hosted at Kailua Kona.

Britta Martin is coached by John Hellemans, a physician, multiple age-group world champion and head coach of the Dutch triathlon team, who coached many stars like Erin Baker, Andrea Hewitt and others. Her swimming coach is Andy Adair, who is specialised on open water and long distance swimming, and was open water coach and manager for the New Zealand team that went to the Oceania Swimming Championships in 2012.

== Notable results ==
- First place
  - Ironman Western Australia, 2012, 2014
  - Ironman Wisconsin, 2014
  - Challenge Taiwan, 2014
  - Auckland Half-Ironman, 2012
  - Ironman 70.3 Port Macquarie, 2012
  - TriStar111 Salzkammergut, Austria, 2012
  - TriStar111 Germany, 2011
  - Marlborough Sounds Half, 2015
  - Challenge Wanaka Half 2011
  - Half Ironman Taupo, 2008
- Second place
  - Challenge Wanaka, 2012
  - Half Ironman New Plymouth, 2014
  - Allgäu Triathlon Immenstadt (half iron distance), 2006
- Third place
  - Ironman Sweden, 2013
  - Ironman France, 2011
- Fourth place
  - Ironman France, 2010
- Fifth place
  - Challenge Roth ETU Long-Distance Triathlon European Championships, 2012
  - Ironman 70.3 Haugesund, 2013
  - Ironman New Zealand, 2010
- Sixth place
  - Port of Tauranga Half-Ironman, 2010
- Seventh place
  - Ironman South Africa, 2015
  - Half-Iron Championships Germany 2003
- Eighth place
  - Ironman 70.3 Germany (Ironman 70.3 European Championships), 2014
  - Ironman 70.3 Lake Stevens, 2009
  - Ironman New Zealand, 2009
- Tenth place
  - Ironman Melbourne (Ironman Asia-Pacific Championship), 2013
- Twenty-first place
  - Ironman World Championships Hawaii, 2013
