= Mie Lacota =

Danish cyclist

Personal information
- Full name: Mie Bekker Lacota
- Born: 10 November 1988 (age 37) Greve Strand, Denmark

Cycling career
- Sport: Cycling
- Disciplines: Road, track
- Role: Rider

Professional team
- 2007: Team Flexpoint
Medal record
Representing Denmark
Women's track cycling
World Championships
| Silver medal – second place | 2007 Palma de Mallorca | Point's race |

Mie Bekker Lacota (born 10 November 1988 in Greve) is a Danish professional road and track cyclist.

== Palmarès ==
2003
National Track Championships

2nd, Points race
2nd, Sprint

2004
1st, Overall, Vittoria Cup
National Track Championships

2nd, Pursuit
2nd, Scratch
2nd, Sprint

1st, Skive
1st, Silkeborg Viborg og Hammel
European Track Championships

2nd, Points race

1st, Sorø
1st, Holbæk
1st, Tønder

2005
1st, Overall, Vittoria Cup
National Road Championships,

2nd, Individual time trial

1st, Esbjerg
1st, Hammel
3rd, Tjejtrampet
1st, Lyngby
2nd, Hadsten
1st, Kalundborg
1st, Tønder
UCI World Championships,

1st, Individual road race

2006
1st, Overall, Vittoria Cup
National Track Championships

1st, Pursuit
1st, Scratch
1st, Sprint

National Road Championships

1st, Team time trial (with Trine Schmidt and Anette Berg)
2nd, Road race

1st, Ringsted
1st, Asnæs
1st, Kolding

2007
2006–2007 World Cup

3rd, Points race, Manchester

1st, 2007 Omloop Het Volk
World Championships, Palma de Mallorca

2nd, Points race

1s, Svendborg
2nd, Padborg/Bov CC
National Track Championships, Ballerup

3rd, Scratch
1st, Sprint

Mie Bekker Lacota retired from cycling end of the season 2007.
