= Paul Wright (New Zealand cyclist) =

New Zealand cyclist

Personal information
- Born: 3 February 1998 (age 28) Wānaka, New Zealand

Cycling career
- Sport: Cycling
- Current team: Modern Adventure Pro Cycling
- Discipline: Road
- Role: Rider

Amateur teams
- 2018: Cycling Southland
- 2019: Team Skoda–Fruzio
- 2019: Team Rauland
- 2020: Holdsworth Zappi Team

Professional teams
- 2021–2022: MG.K Vis Colors for Peace VPM
- 2023: Bolton Equities Black Spoke
- 2024: Rembe Pro Cycling Team Sauerland
- 2024–2025: Factor Racing
- 2026–: Modern Adventure Pro Cycling

Major wins
- One-day races and Classics National Road Race Championships (2025)

Paul Wright (born 3 February 1998) is a New Zealand racing cyclist, who currently rides for UCI ProTeam Modern Adventure Pro Cycling. He was educated at Mount Aspiring College and Warren Wilson College, attending the latter on a mountain bike scholarship. In 2025, he won the New Zealand National Road Race Championships. He is the older brother of biathlete Campbell Wright.

== Major results ==
=== Road ===
2019
3rd Overall Manx International Grand Prix
2020
6th Overall In the footsteps of the Romans
2023
3rd Gravel and Tar Classic
5th Criterium, National Championships
2025
1st Road race, National Championships
3rd GP Brda-Collio
3rd Poreč Classic
6th Overall Istrian Spring Tour
6th GP Slovenian Istria

=== MTB ===
2015
3rd Cross-country eliminator, Oceanian Championships
2018
3rd Under-23 cross-country, Oceanian Championships
