= Futuro–Maxxis Pro Cycling =

Team information
- UCI code: FMP
- Registered: Australia
- Founded: 2019
- Discipline: Road
- Status: UCI Continental (2019–)

Team name history
- 2019–: Futuro–Maxxis Pro Cycling

Futuro–Maxxis Pro Cycling is a professional road bicycle racing team which participates in elite races. The team registered with the UCI for the 2019 season.

== Team roster ==
Rider	Date of birth
Michael Bettany (AUS)	26 November 1985 (age 40)
Carter Bettles (AUS)	2 September 1998 (age 28)
Daniel Busbridge (NZL)	10 July 1995 (age 31)
Thomas Coates (AUS)	22 July 1992 (age 34)
Sam Cook (NZL)	23 December 2000 (age 25)
Cameron Layton (AUS)	19 September 1991 (age 34)
Nick Miller (NZL)	24 October 1991 (age 34)

Rider	Date of birth
Dylan Newbery (AUS)	10 March 1994 (age 32)
Thomas Robinson (AUS)	30 November 1989 (age 36)
Rhys Robotham (AUS)	30 December 2000 (age 25)
Travis James Parkley-Simpson (AUS)	20 April 1991 (age 35)
Lachlan Sinclair (AUS)	24 August 2000 (age 26)
Christopher Williams (AUS)	10 November 1981 (age 44)
