= Jason Christie (cyclist) =

New Zealand cyclist (born 1990)

Personal information
- Born: 22 December 1990 (age 35) Ashburton, New Zealand

Cycling career
- Sport: Cycling
- Discipline: Road
- Role: Rider

Professional teams
- 2010: Endura Racing
- 2012: Differdange–Magic–SportFood.de
- 2013: OCBC Singapore Continental Cycling Team
- 2014: CCN
- 2015: Avanti Racing Team
- 2016: Kenyan Riders Downunder
- 2017: Team Sapura Cycling
- 2019–2021: Aisan Racing Team

Major wins
- One-day races and Classics National Road Race Championships (2016, 2018)

Jason Christie (born 22 December 1990) is a New Zealand professional racing cyclist, who last rode for UCI Continental team Aisan Racing Team. In January 2016 he won the New Zealand National Road Race Championships, therefore becoming the first world number one of the newly established UCI World Ranking.

== Major results ==
2011
1st Time trial, National Under-23 Road Championships
4th Time trial, Oceania Under-23 Road Championships
6th Time trial, UCI Under-23 Road World Championships
8th Chrono Champenois
10th Overall Tour of Wellington
2012
2nd Time trial, National Under-23 Road Championships
Oceania Under-23 Road Championships

3rd Road race
4th Time trial

2013
1st Stage 1 Tour de Ijen
1st Stage 3 New Zealand Cycle Classic
4th Time trial, Oceania Road Championships
2014
National Road Championships

3rd Time trial
4th Road race

2015
1st Tour de Okinawa
2nd Overall New Zealand Cycle Classic

1st Stage 1

3rd Road race, National Road Championships
Oceania Road Championships

6th Time trial
10th Road race

7th Chrono Champenois
2016
1st Road race, National Road Championships
1st Stage 4 Tour de Ijen
1st Stage 1 Tour de Flores
2017
National Road Championships

2nd Time trial
2nd Road race

4th Time trial, Oceania Road Championships
2018
National Road Championships

1st Road race
3rd Time trial

2019
Oceania Road Championships

2nd Road race
2nd Time trial

5th Tour de Okinawa
2022
2nd Time trial, Oceania Road Championships
