= Liam Hill =

Australian cyclist (born 1993)

Personal information
- Full name: Liam Hill
- Born: 5 October 1993 (age 33) Melbourne, Australia
- Height: 6 ft 7 in (201 cm)
- Weight: 66 kg (146 lb)

Cycling career
- Sport: Cycling
- Current team: Kenyan Riders Downunder
- Discipline: Road
- Role: Rider
- Rider type: Leadout/Domestic

Amateur team
- Search2retain, ProTeamDownunder

Professional team
- 2016–: Kenyan Riders Downunder

Liam Hill (born 1 October 1993 in Melbourne) was an Australian cyclist riding for Kenyan Riders Downunder.
