= 2007 UCI Track Cycling World Championships – Women's points race =

Results of sporting competition

Women's points race at the 2007 UCI Track Cycling World Championships
- Venue: Palma Arena
- Location: Palma de Mallorca, Spain
- Date: 1 April 2007
- Winning points: 35

Medalists
gold medal	Katherine Bates	Australia
silver medal	Mie Bekker Lacota	Denmark
bronze medal	Catherine Cheatley	New Zealand

The Women's Points Race is one of the 7 women's events at the 2007 UCI Track World Championship, held in Palma de Mallorca, Spain.

Ninetten cyclists from 19 countries participated in the contest. Because of the number of entries, there were no qualification rounds for this discipline. Consequently, the event was run direct to the final.

== Final ==
The final and only race was run at 17:50 on April 1. The competition consisted on 100 laps, making a total of 25 km with 10 sprints.

Elapsed time=32:50.840 Average speed=45.665 km/h

Rank	Name	Country	Sprint Number										Finish Order	Lap Points			Total Points
Rank	Name	Country	1	2	3	4	5	6	7	8	9	10	Finish Order	+	–	Balance	Total Points
	Katherine Bates	Australia	3		2		5	3		2			8	20		20	35
	Mie Bekker Lacota	Denmark		3			3	2		1			5	20		20	29
	Catherine Cheatley	New Zealand					1	5			1		7	20		20	27
4	Belem Guerrero Méndez	Mexico					2	1					16	20		20	23
5	Yumari González Valdivieso	Cuba	5		5						2		15				12
6	Adrie Visser	Netherlands		2		5			3			1	4				11
7	Vera Carrara	Italy		5						5			9				10
8	Charlotte Becker	Germany				1			5			3	2				9
9	Gina Grain	Canada	2							3	3		6				8
10	Li Yan	China							2		5		11				7
11	Gema Pascual Torrecilla	Spain	1			3						2	3				6
12	María Luisa Calle	Colombia										5	1				5
13	Olga Slyusareva	Russia		1					1				12				2
14	Sarah Hammer	United States				2							18				2
15	Pascale Schnider	Switzerland			1								14				1
16	Eleftheria-Maria Ellinikaki	Greece											10				0
17	Lada Kozlíková	Czech Republic											13				0
18	Cathy Moncassin Prime	France											17				0
	Yelyzaveta Bochkaryova	Ukraine			3									20	-20	DNF	
