= Lance Payne =

New Zealand cyclist

Personal information
- Full name: Lancelot David Payne
- Born: 11 April 1933 Palmerston North, New Zealand
- Died: 16 November 2011 (aged 78) Nelson, New Zealand

Cycling career
- Sport: Cycling

Major wins
- One-day races and classics National Road Race Championships (1952, 1954, 1958)

Lancelot David Payne (11 April 1933 – 16 November 2011) was a New Zealand racing cyclist, who competed for his country in the road race at two British Empire and Commonwealth Games, and won three national road race titles.

== Biography ==
Born in Palmerston North on 11 April 1933, Payne was the son of David Payne and Rona Angelina (Mavis) Payne (née Thompson). He grew up on a farm at Glen Oroua and left home when he was 15 years old. He worked as a Post Office clerk and took up cycling in 1950. Two years later, he won the first of his three New Zealand national road race titles, with the other victories coming in 1954 and 1958.

Payne represented New Zealand in the road race at the 1954 British Empire and Commonwealth Games. He was unplaced after being part of a two-man breakaway with Malcolm Campbell of Wales that led for most of the race before being overtaken on the penultimate lap. Four years later, Payne again competed in British Empire and Commonwealth Games road race. He was in the leading group of three riders with 11 kilometres (7 mi) remaining, but punctured and eventually finished in 11th place.

In 1959, Payne was struck by a car in a head-on collision at Paremata, but he recovered and continued his amateur cycling career, winning the Tour of Manawatū in 1962, before retiring two years later.

In 1980, Payne left the Post Office and ran a dairy at Plimmerton for a time. He then worked as the caretaker on Mana Island for the Department of Lands and Survey. After he removed the last cattle from the island, it was designated as a reserve. He then served as the lighthouse keeper on The Brothers in Cook Strait, until it was automated and no longer staffed in 1990.

Payne died in Nelson on 16 November 2011.
