= Team McDonalds Down Under =

Team information
- UCI code: TMD
- Registered: Australia
- Founded: 2018
- Discipline: Road
- Status: UCI Continental (2018)

Team name history
- 2018: Team McDonalds Down Under

Team McDonalds Down Under is a UCI Continental team founded in 2018 that is based in Australia, gaining UCI Continental status in the same year.

== 2018 Team roster ==
Rider	Date of birth
Michael Bettany (AUS)	26 November 1985 (aged 33)
Mathew Bickel (AUS)	15 March 1989 (aged 29)
Kyle Bridgwood (AUS)	23 February 1989 (aged 29)
Daniel Busbridge (NZL)	10 July 1995 (aged 23)
Thomas Coates (AUS)	22 July 1992 (aged 26)
Ross Freeman (AUS)	19 October 1991 (aged 27)
Cameron Layton (AUS)	19 September 1991 (aged 27)

Rider	Date of birth
Nick Miller (NZL)	24 October 1991 (aged 27)
Yuan Tang Peng (TAI)	10 May 1993 (aged 25)
Campbell Pithie (NZL)	28 October 1999 (aged 19)
Alexander Ray (NZL)	3 October 1990 (aged 28)
Kane Richards (AUS)	1 December 1996 (aged 22)
Joel Strachan (AUS)	20 August 1981 (aged 37)
