= Rosalind Reekie-May =

New Zealand cyclist (born 1972)

Personal information
- Full name: Rosalind Jane Reekie-May
- Nickname: "Roz"
- Born: 3 February 1972 (age 54) Palmerston North, New Zealand

Cycling career
- Sport: Cycling

Rosalind Jane "Roz" Reekie-May formerly Reekie (born 3 February 1972) is a road cyclist from New Zealand. In 1992 she won the New Zealand National Road Race Championships.

At the 1992 Summer Olympics in Barcelona she came 49th in the Road Race.

At the 2000 Summer Olympics at Sydney she came 36th in the Road Race.

At the 2002 Commonwealth Games at Montreal she came 5th in the Road Race.
