= Nick Carter (cyclist) =

New Zealand cyclist (1924–2003)

Personal information
- Full name: Thomas Russell Carter
- Born: 5 September 1924 Nelson, New Zealand
- Died: 23 November 2003 (aged 79)

Cycling career
- Sport: Cycling

Major wins
- One-day races and Classics National Road Race Championships (1945, 1946, 1947, 1949)
Medal record
Men's road bicycle racing
Representing New Zealand
British Empire Games
| Silver medal – second place | 1950 Auckland | Road race |

Thomas Russell "Nick" Carter (5 September 1924 – 23 November 2003) was a racing cyclist from Nelson, New Zealand, who won a silver medal in the men's road race at the 1950 British Empire Games in Auckland. He also competed in the road race at the 1948 Summer Olympics in London.

Carter was educated at Nelson College from 1937 to 1939. He died in 2003 and his ashes were buried in Marsden Valley Cemetery, Stoke.

== Major results ==
1945
1st Road race, National Road Championships
1946
1st Road race, National Road Championships
1947
1st Road race, National Road Championships
1949
1st Road race, National Road Championships
1950
2nd Road race, British Empire Games
