= Nick Miller (cyclist) =

New Zealand racing cyclist

Personal information
- Born: 24 October 1991 (age 34) New Zealand

Cycling career
- Sport: Cycling
- Discipline: road
- Role: Rider

Amateur team
- 2015: Scody Downunder

Professional teams
- 2016: Kenyan Riders Downunder
- 2018: Team McDonalds Down Under
- 2019: Futuro–Maxxis Pro Cycling

Nick Miller (born 24 October 1991) is a New Zealand racing cyclist, who last rode for Futuro–Maxxis Pro Cycling.

== Major results ==
2016
9th The REV Classic
2017
6th Overall Jelajah Malaysia
7th Overall Tour de Flores
