= Christopher Williams (cyclist) =

Australian racing cyclist (born 1981)

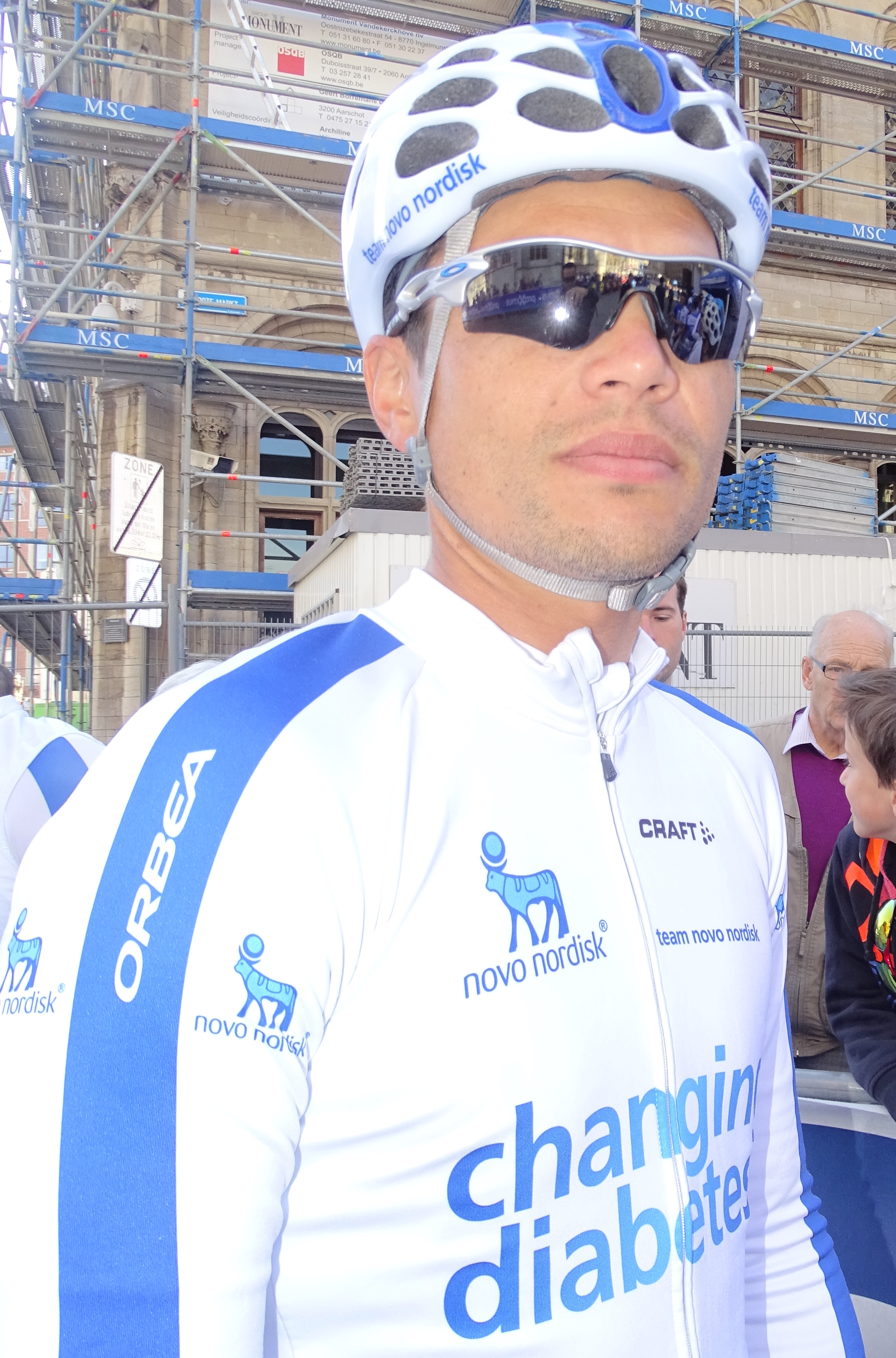
- Williams in 2015.

Personal information
- Full name: Christopher Williams
- Born: 10 November 1981 (age 44) Brisbane, Australia
- Height: 181 cm (5 ft 11 in)
- Weight: 72 kg (159 lb)

Cycling career
- Sport: Cycling
- Current team: Futuro–Maxxis Pro Cycling
- Discipline: Road
- Role: Rider

Professional teams
- 2011: Champion System
- 2013–2018: Team Novo Nordisk
- 2019–: Futuro–Maxxis Pro Cycling

Christopher Williams (born 10 November 1981 in Brisbane) is an Australian racing cyclist riding for Futuro–Maxxis Pro Cycling. He rode in the 2016 Milan–San Remo.
