= Alexander Ray =

New Zealand cyclist (born 1990)

Personal information
- Full name: Alexander Ray
- Born: 3 October 1990 (age 36) New Zealand

Cycling career
- Sport: Cycling
- Current team: Mitre 10 MEGA Masterton
- Discipline: Road
- Role: Rider

Amateur teams
- 2019: Manawatu
- 2021–: Mitre 10 MEGA Masterton

Professional teams
- 2014: Hincapie Sportswear Development Team
- 2015: Silber Pro Cycling Team
- 2016: Team Illuminate
- 2017: Start–Vaxes Cycling Team
- 2018: Team McDonalds Down Under

Alexander Ray (born 3 October 1990) is a New Zealand racing cyclist, who currently rides for New Zealand amateur team Mitre 10 MEGA Masterton.

On 18 April 2018 Ray was hit by a car while training in Auckland, he was then put into an induced coma. Ray spent eight days in critical care in hospital.

== Major results ==
2015
6th Overall Joe Martin Stage Race
2016
6th Overall Tour de Taiwan
