= Cath Cheatley =

New Zealand cyclist (born 1983)

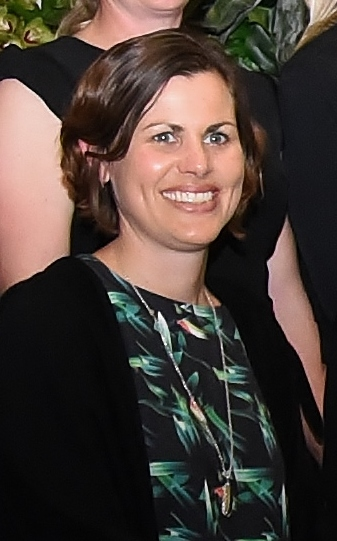
- Cheatley in 2018

Personal information
- Full name: Catherine Cheatley
- Born: Catherine Sell; 6 April 1983 (age 43) Whanganui, New Zealand
- Height: 1.70 m (5 ft 7 in)
- Weight: 64 kg (141 lb)

Cycling career
- Sport: Cycling
- Current team: Retired
- Disciplines: Road, track
- Role: Rider

Professional teams
- 2007–2008: Cheerwine Cycling Team
- 2009–2010: Colavita–Sutter Home
- 2011–2012: Colavita Forno d'Asolo

Major wins
- New Zealand Championships (Road) (2004, 2006, 2011); Oceania Games (Scratch) (2005); Women's Tour of New Zealand (2005); New Zealand Track Championships (Pursuit) (2007); Fitchburg Longsjo Classic (2008)
Medal record
Women's track cycling
Representing New Zealand
World Championships
Bronze medal – third place	2007 Palma de Mallorca	Points race

Catherine Cheatley (née Sell; born 6 April 1983 in Whanganui) is a retired New Zealand professional road and track cyclist. She won two New Zealand championship titles in both road race and individual track pursuit, and later represented her nation New Zealand at the 2008 Summer Olympics. Before her official retirement in June 2012 because of sustained bike crash-related injuries, Cheatley moved to the United States to race for the Cheerwine and Colavita–Sutter Home pro cycling teams in the women's elite professional events on the UCI Women's World Cup, and UCI World Championships, where she earned the bronze medal for the women's points race in 2007.

== Racing career ==
=== Professional career ===
Cheatley made her world championship debut at the 2007 UCI Track Cycling World Championships in Palma de Mallorca, Spain on 1 April, where she took home the bronze medal in the women's points race, adding to the individual pursuit gold she had won at the New Zealand track championships two weeks previously. Strong and impressive results landed her a spot on the United States' Cheerwine Cycling Team, which signified a start of her professional sporting career. While competing for Cheerwine under an exclusive two-year contract, Cheatley managed her team to "defend their jersey" and dominate the Fitchburg Longsjo Classic circuit title in 2008.

Cheatley qualified for the New Zealand squad in two cycling events at the 2008 Summer Olympics in Beijing by receiving one of the nation's two available berths from the UCI World Cup and by finishing third in the points race from the UCI World Championships. In the women's road race, held on the second day of the Games, Cheatley posted a time of 3:41:08 to successfully complete a gruelling race with a fifty-third-place finish, trailing behind US rider and two-time Olympian Christine Thorburn by a small amount of velocity. The following week, in the women's points race, Cheatley failed to collect a single point from the 10 scoring laps in a 25-km sprint race, finishing well down the field in seventeenth place.

When the Cheerwine folded the 2008 season, Cheatley transferred to Colavita–Sutter Home for two seasons, and then helped her women's cycling team grab an early lead on the first stage of the Cascade Cycling Classic before mounting a second place overall at the final circuit.

In 2011, Cheatley won her third road race title at the national championships in Christchurch. Shortly after, Cheatley was seriously injured in the round-the-mountain road crash around Mount Taranaki, suffering multiple fractures of her hip that required full surgery and rehabilitation. In June 2012, Cheatley had officially retired from competitive cycling, and instead, worked on a full-time role as one of BikeNZ's regional development coordinators.

== Personal life ==
Catherine Sell married fellow Wanganui Cycling Club member Dayle Cheatley in April 2006.

== Career highlights ==
2004
1st New Zealand National Road Race Championships
2005
1st Overall, Women's Tour of New Zealand
1st Oceania Games (Scratch race), Wanganui
2006
1st New Zealand National Road Race Championships
2007
1st New Zealand Track Cycling Championships (Pursuit), Invercargill (NZL)
1st Stage 1, Nature Valley Grand Prix, United States
2nd New Zealand Track Cycling Championships (Points race), Invercargill (NZL)
2nd Stage 3, Nature Valley Grand Prix, United States
2nd Stage 5, Tour de Toona, United States
(bronze) UCI Track Cycling World Championships, (Points race), Palma de Mallorca (ESP)
2008
1st Clarendon Cup
1st Overall, Fitchburg Longsjo Classic, United States

1st Stage 2
2nd Stage 1

2nd Overall, Joe Martin Stage Race, United States

2nd Prologue
2nd Stage 1
3rd Stage 3

3rd New Zealand Championships (Criterium)
10th UCI Track Cycling World Championships (Scratch), Manchester (GBR)
17th Olympic Games (Points race), Beijing (CHN)
53rd Olympic Games (Road), Beijing (CHN)
2009
1st Stage 3, Tour de Vineyards, Marble Mountain (NZL)
2nd Stage 2, Tour de Vineyards, New Zealand
2nd Stage 2, Tour of the Gila, United States
2nd Stage 5, Tour of the Gila, United States
3rd Stage 1, Tour de Vineyards, New Zealand
3rd Overall, San Dimas Stage Race, United States

2nd Stage 2

3rd Stage 2, Sea Otter Classic, United States
3rd Stage 4, Tour of the Gila, Silver City, New Mexico (NZL)
5th Overall, Liberty Classic, Philadelphia, Pennsylvania (USA)
10th 2009 UCI World Championships (Road), Mendrisio (SUI)
2010
2nd Overall, Cascade Cycling Classic, United States

1st Stage 1
2nd Stage 3
2nd Stage 5

10th Stage 1, Tour of Chongming Island, Xizang (CHN)
10th Stage 3, Tour of Chongming Island, Shanghai (CHN)
2011
1st New Zealand Championships (Road), Christchurch (NZL)
2nd Overall, Tour of New Zealand, New Zealand

2nd Stage 1
2nd Stage 2
3rd Stage 3
