= Kent Bostick =

American cyclist

Personal information
- Born: June 27, 1953 (age 73) Corrales, New Mexico, United States

Cycling career
- Sport: Cycling
Medal record
Representing United States
Pan American Games
Gold medal – first place	1987 Indianapolis	Road time trial team
Gold medal – first place	1995 Mar del Plata	Individual pursuit

Kent Bostick (born June 27, 1953) is an American cyclist. He competed in the men's individual pursuit at the 1996 Summer Olympics.
