= Kenyan Riders Downunder =

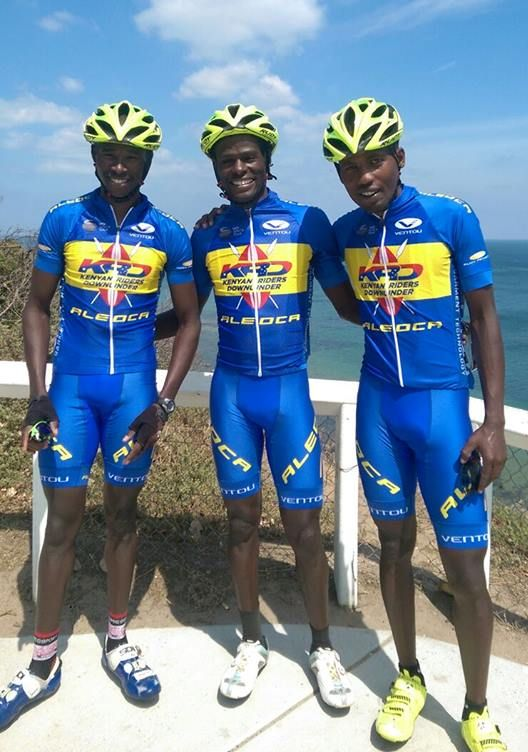
- Kenyan Riders Downunder: Lang'at, Samwel and Sule in 2016

Team information
- UCI code: KRD
- Registered: Kenya
- Founded: 2016
- Disbanded: 2016
- Discipline: Road
- Status: UCI Continental

Key personnel
- General manager: Nicholas Leong
- Team managers: Garry Elliott; Simon Blake; Stewart Crowley; Ciarán Fitzpatrick

Team name history
- 2016: Kenyan Riders Downunder

Kenyan Riders Downunder (UCI team code: KRD) was a Kenyan registered, Australian based, UCI Continental team that operated in 2016. It participated in some of the top events in Australia. The team was formed from the merger of two teams, the Kenyan Riders and Pro Team Downunder and was the first UCI Continental team to be registered in East Africa.

== Team roster ==
As of 12 January 2016

Rider	Date of birth
Thomas Coates (AUS)	22 July 1992 (age 34)
Sanwel Ekiru (KEN)	11 February 1983 (age 43)
Joseph Gichora Kamau (KEN)	9 January 1993 (age 33)
Liam Hill (AUS)	5 October 1993 (age 32)
Suleiman Kangangi (KEN)	9 December 1988 (age 37)

Rider	Date of birth
Ayub Kathurima (KEN)	6 August 1984 (age 42)
Geffory Kiprotich (KEN)	15 September 1991 (age 34)
Nick Miller (NZL)	24 October 1991 (age 34)
Samwel Mwangi (KEN)	2 February 1984 (age 42)
Morgan Smith (NZL)	25 May 1988 (age 38)
Bradley Soden (AUS)	12 August 1997 (age 29)

== Major wins ==
2016
New Zealand National Road Race Championships, Jason Christie

== National champions ==
2016
New Zealand Road Race, Jason Christie
