= Tour de Pakistan =

Cycling event

Race details
- Date: November
- Region: Pakistan
- Discipline: Road
- Type: Stage race
- Organiser: Pakistan Cycling Federation

History
- First edition: 1983
- Editions: 16 (as of 2011)
- Most recent: Sabir Ali (PAK)

The Tour de Pakistan is a bicycle race held in Pakistan roughly every two years over more than 1,648 kilometres (1,024 mi). It is modelled after the Tour de France. The race begins in Karachi and ends in Peshawar. It is the longest cycling race in Asia. The event used to be 22 stages long and 2200 kilometres in length, but in 2007 it was reduced to 1648 kilometres and 11 stages.

== History ==
The Pakistan Cycling Federation wanted to promote road cycle racing, as most of its focus had been on track cycling. Thus the formation of the Tour de Pakistan, based on the Tour de France, it would give the opportunity to test Pakistani cyclists. The gruelling event became one of the longest and toughest in Asia which has seen international teams compete alongside a Pakistani teams. The current prize money is $10,000 which is shared out between the top six. The race is almost always scheduled during the spring season, which lasts from late February to early May in the country.

== 2007 ==
In 2007, the 13th Tour de Pakistan was won by New Zealand cyclist Robin Reid for Discovery Channel Marco Polo Team, with fellow Kiwi Justin Kerr for New Zealand National Team was overall second and Canadian Mathew Usborne riding for Team Integrale in third. WAPDA won the team event of the race ahead of Army and SSCG team.

== 2008 ==
In 2007, the 14th Tour de Pakistan was won by Naimat Ali from Sui Southern Gas Company (SSGC). Runner-up was Haroon-ur-Rashid for WAPDA while Sri Lanka’s Meemanaga Perera for Team Sri Lanka third position in the competition.

== 2010 ==
The 15th Tour de Pakistan started on March 1, 2010 participated by cyclists from different teams of Pakistan and Afghanistan. Zahid Gulfam of WAPDA won the race by covering distance of 1,655 km in 46 hours 13 minutes and 9 seconds and received US$2,500. Nisar Ahmed got second position and got US$1,500 while third position holder Hashmatullah of Afghanistan received US$1,000. Fourth to sixth finishers received US$750 each.

== Winners ==
Name	Nationality	Team	Year
Haroon Rashid	Pakistan	WAPDA Cycling	2001
Zahid Gulfam	Pakistan	WAPDA Cycling	2003
Thomas Lodburaey	Germany	German Team	2005
Robin Reid	New Zealand	Discovery Channel	2007
Naimat Ali	Pakistan	SSCG Cycling	2008
Zahid Gulfam	Pakistan	WAPDA Cycling	2010
Sabir Ali	Pakistan	WAPDA Cycling	2011
