= Kati Läike =

Finnish sailor

Personal information
- Nationality: Finnish
- Born: 22 August 1967 (age 57); Turku, Finland

Sport
- Sport: Sailing

Katri "Kati" Läike (born 22 August 1967) is a Finnish sailor. She competed in the women's 470 event at the 1992 Summer Olympics. Läike emigrated to New Zealand in 1993, and she has represented New Zealand in cycling competitions.
