= Logan Hutchings =

New Zealand cyclist (born 1984)

Personal information
- Full name: Logan Dennis Hutchings
- Born: 28 January 1984 (age 42) Rotorua, New Zealand

Cycling career
- Sport: Cycling
- Discipline: Road
- Role: Rider

Amateur teams
- 2005: AVC Aix-en-Provence
- 2006: Wielerclub Soenens Germon
- 2008: Beveren 2000
- 2010–2011: Hotel San José
- 2013: Elbowz Racing–Boneshaker Project
- 2014: Boneshaker D1 Racing
- 2015: Elevate Cycling

Professional teams
- 2009: Cinelli–Down Under
- 2016: Elevate Pro Cycling–Bicycle World

Major wins
- One-day races and Classics National Time Trial Championships (2008)

Logan Dennis Hutchings (born 28 January 1984) is a New Zealand former professional cyclist. He notably won the New Zealand National Time Trial Championships in 2008 and finished second overall in the 2005–06 UCI Oceania Tour.

== Major results ==
2005
Oceania Under-23 Road Championships

1st Time trial
2nd Road race

National Under-23 Road Championships

1st Road race
1st Time trial

2006
2nd Overall UCI Oceania Tour
6th Chrono Champenois
7th Overall Tour of Wellington
2007
3rd Overall Tour of Southland
2008
National Road Championships

1st Time trial
5th Road race

1st Stages (TTT) Tour of Southland
1st Stage 6 Tour de Namur
10th Overall Tour de Bretagne
2009
1st Stages 1 (TTT) & 3 Tour of Southland
2nd Time trial, Oceania Road Championships
2010
1st Overall Hotter'N Hell Hundred

1st Stage 3

2012
2nd Bucks County Classic
2013
1st Stage 3 Hotter'N Hell Hundred
2016
9th The Reading 120
