= Glen Mitchell (New Zealand cyclist) =

New Zealand cyclist (born 1972)

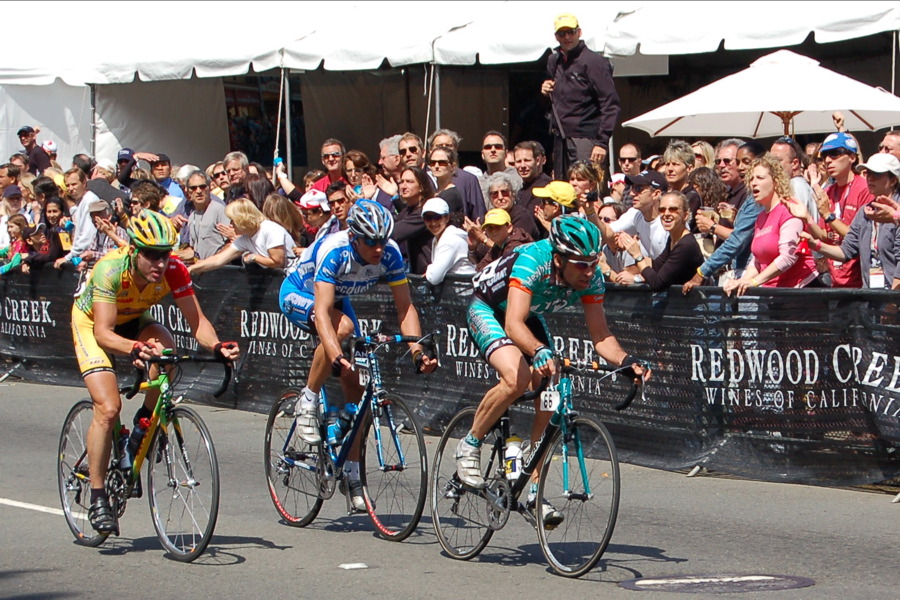
- Glen Mitchell (left), Jason McCartney, and John Lieswyn at the 2005 San Francisco Grand Prix

Personal information
- Full name: Glen Anthony Mitchell
- Born: 19 October 1972 (age 54) Putāruru, New Zealand
- Height: 178 cm (5 ft 10 in)
- Weight: 70 kg (154 lb)

Sport
- Country: New Zealand
- Sport: Cycling

Glen Anthony Mitchell (born 19 October 1972) is a New Zealand cyclist.

Mitchell was born in 1972 in Putāruru in the Waikato. He competed at the 1996 Summer Olympics in Atlanta, in the men's individual road race, and at the 2000 Summer Olympics in Sydney, in the men's individual road race. He did not finish in either competition.

He was the Oceania road race champion in 1997. He won the 2000 Tour of Southland.
