= Vern Hanaray =

New Zealand cyclist (born 1951)

Vernon Hanaray
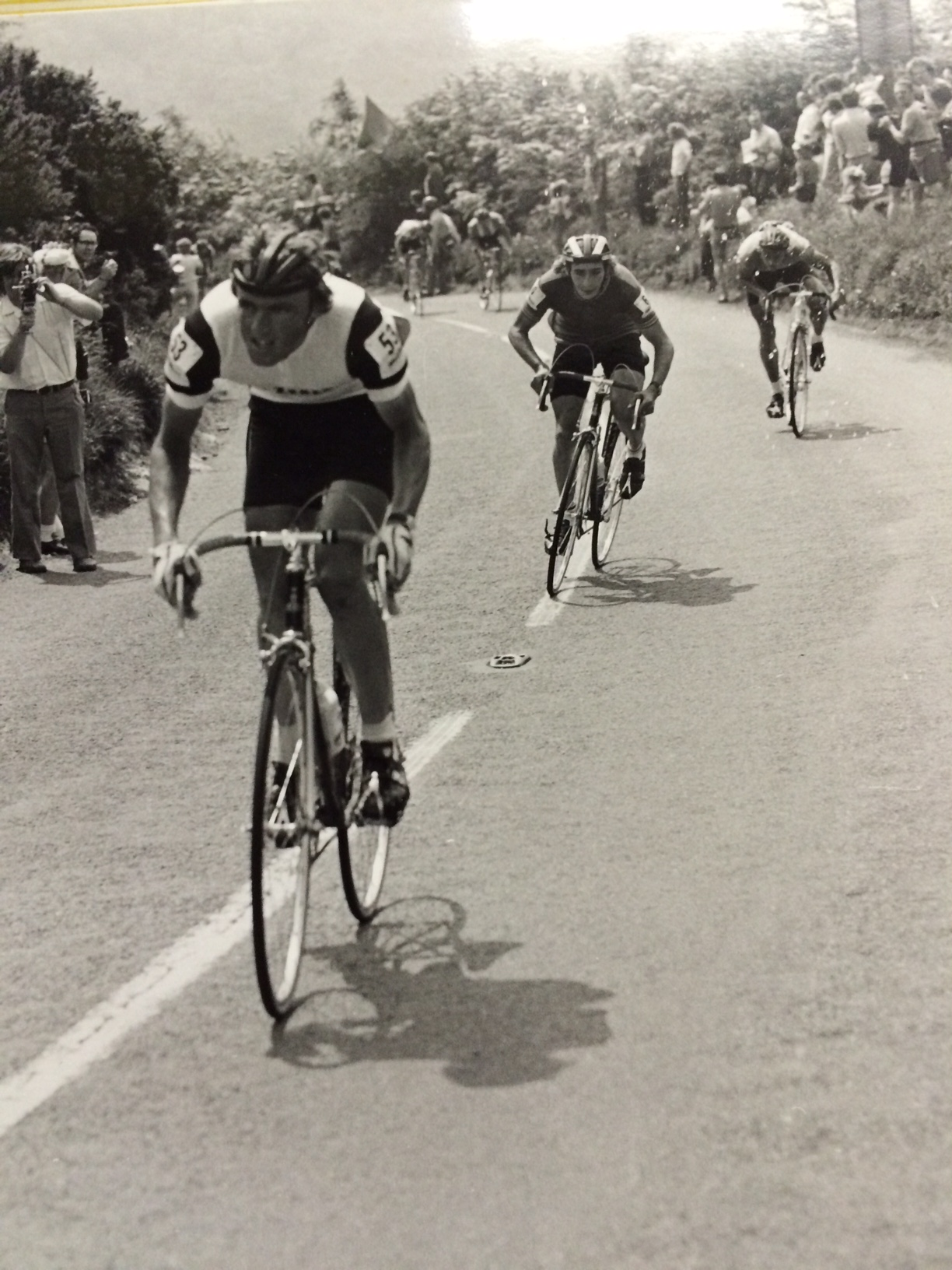
- KOM - Milk Race 1976, Vernon Hanaray
- Born: 14 August 1951 (age 73); Masterton, New Zealand
- Education: St Johns Boys School, Hastings, New Zealand
- Website: APSGroup

Vernon ("Vern") John Hanaray (born 14 August 1951 in Masterton) is a former road cyclist from New Zealand, who represented his native country in the men's individual road race at the 1972 and 1976 Summer Olympics. He also competed at the 1974 and 1978 Commonwealth Games. Hanaray won the 1974 edition of the Archer Grand Prix cycle race.

== Sport ==
Road Skating

1968

New Zealand 1st Place, Intermediate Men's 5 Miles Road Race

1969

New Zealand 1st Place, Intermediate Men's 5 Miles Road Race

Road Cycling

1970

New Zealand 3rd Place, Road Cycling Championship

1971

New Zealand 1st Place, Road Cycling Championship
New Zealand 1st Place, Dulux 6 Day Cycle Race
New Zealand 1st Place, King of the Mountains (Dulux 6 Day)

1972

New Zealand Olympic Games Team, Munich

1973

New Zealand 1st Place, Road Cycling Championship
New Zealand 1st Place, Dulux 6 Day Cycle Race
New Zealand 1st Place, King of the Mountains (Dulux 6 Day)

1974

United Kingdom 1st Place, Pernod International Grand Prix
Isle of Man 2nd Place, Manx International Road Race

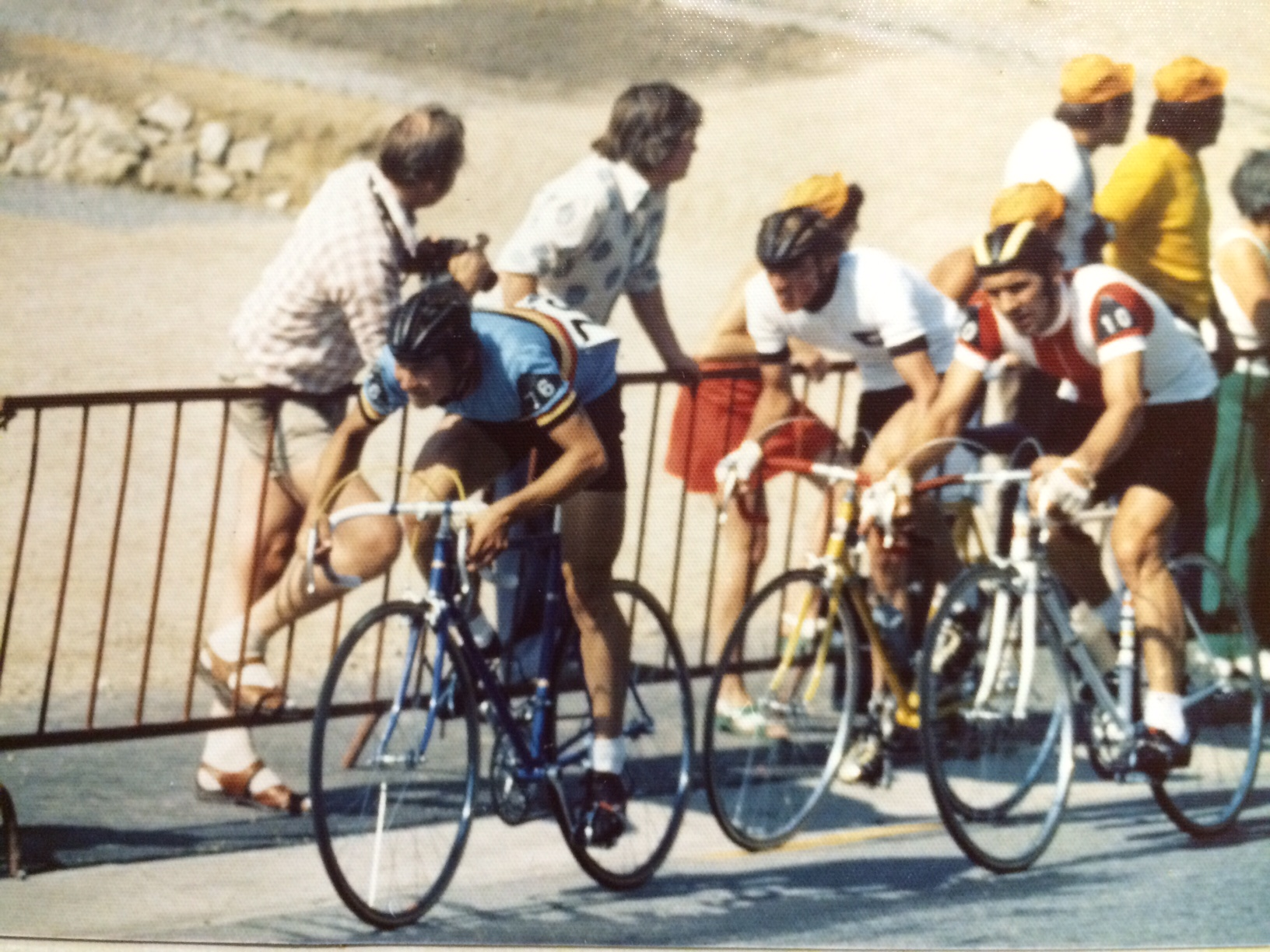
Vernon Hanaray - Belgium 1975

1975

Belgium 1st Place, Bornem
Netherlands 1st Place, Stage 2 Leimuiden International Wieleravond Zesdaage Den Haag

1976

Belgium 1st Place, Stage 1 Les Deux Jours D Angreau
Belgium 2nd Place, Stage 2 D Angreau
Belgium 1st Place, Classement Final, D Angreau
Belgium 1st Place, Classement Du Meilleur Grimpeur, D Angreau
Belgium 1st Place, Outer
Belgium 1st Place, International Liefhebbers te Oudenaarde-Nederename
Belgium 1st Place, Tielt
Belgium 1st Place, Stage 1 Tweedaage Van Kemmel
Belgium 2nd Place, Stage 2 Tweedaage Van Kemmel
Belgium 1st Place, Einstand, Tweedaage Van Kemmel

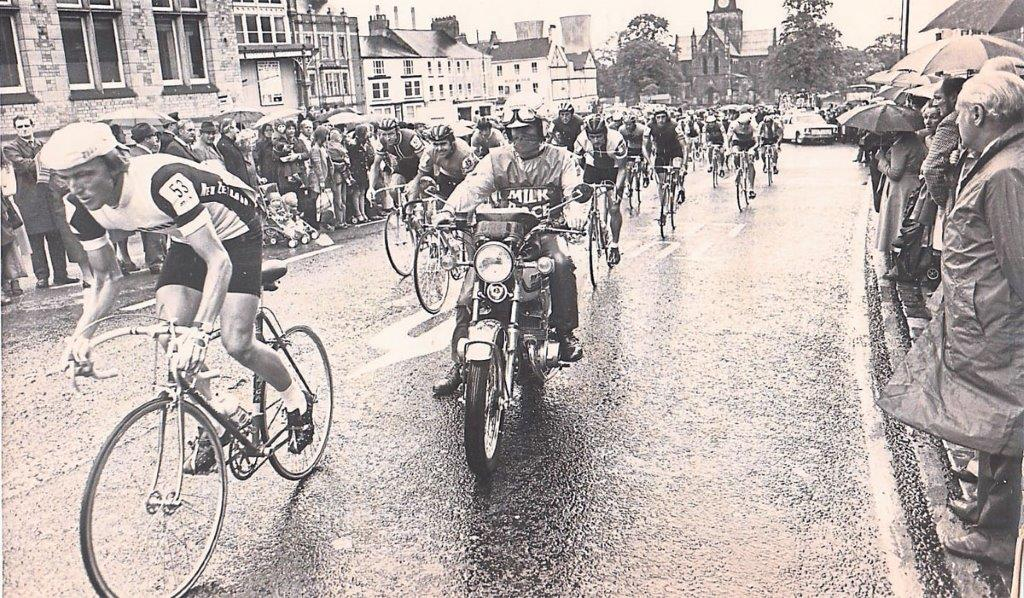
Vernon Hanaray - 1976 Milk Race

United Kingdom 1st Place, Blackpool Centenary, Milk Race Tour of Britain
United Kingdom 1st Place, Middlemores Combativity, Milk Race Tour of Britain
New Zealand Olympic Games, Team Montreal
New Zealand 1st Place, King of the Mountains (Dulux Six Day)

1977

Belgium 3rd Place, Etoile Hennuyere, Classement General
New Zealand 1st Place, Road Cycling Championship
France 3rd Place, Tour de Nouvelle Caledonie Classment General
France 1st Place, Classment de la Montage

1979

Australia 2nd Grafton-Inverell Classic
New Zealand 1st Place, King of the Mountains (Dulux Six Day)

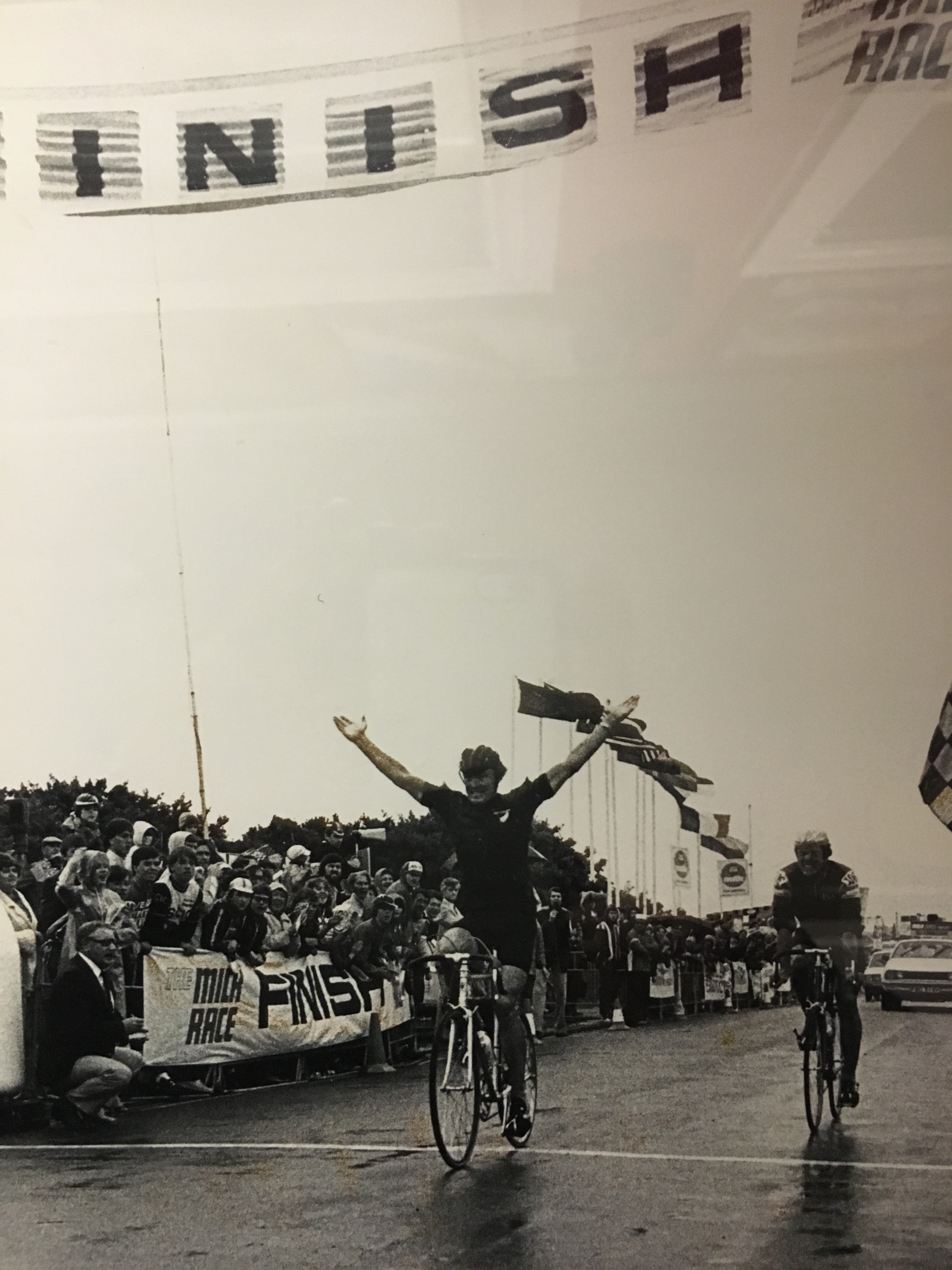
1980 Milk Race

1980

United Kingdom 1st Place, Stage 8 Southport, Milk Race Tour of Britain
United Kingdom 3rd Place, Stage 6 Llandudno

Winner Most Aggressive Rider, Milk Race Tour of Britain

New Zealand Selected Olympic Games Team, Moscow
France 3rd Place, De la Quatrieme Etape, Tour D'Auvergne
France 1st Place, Classment De La Montagne, Tour D'Auvergne
New Zealand 1st Place, King of the Mountains (Dulux Six Day)
