= Robin Reid (cyclist) =

New Zealand cyclist (born 1975)

Robin Neil Reid (born 16 December 1975 in Invercargill) is a former road racing cyclist from Blenheim, New Zealand who was a New Zealand time trial champion and Olympian. He won the Tour de Pakistan race in 2007. There he met the German-born former professional female cyclist Britta Martin, who won the female sections of the event and has been together with her ever since. End of 2007 they moved in together in Nelson, New Zealand. Britta Martin competes since 2008 as a professional triathlete mainly at the Ironman distance.

Since then Robin Reid is competing at triathlon races too. His fastest ironman distance race was at Challenge Roth in Germany 2014, finishing in a time of 8 h 54 min 14 s for 18th in a field of 3500 competitors. In February 2015 Robin Reid celebrated his victory at the 'Marlborough Sounds Half Ironman together with Britta Martin as fastest women in this event.
