= List of teams and cyclists in the 2012 Tour de France =

The number of riders per nation that participated in the 2012 Tour de France: 20+ / 10–19 / 2–9 / 1

The 2012 Tour de France was the 99th edition of the race, one of cycling's Grand Tours. It started in the Belgian city of Liège on 30 June and finished on the Champs-Élysées in Paris on 22 July. The Tour consisted of twenty-one race stages, including an opening prologue, and covered a total distance of 3,496.9 km (2,173 mi).

The race was contested by a total of twenty-two teams. All eighteen of the 2012 UCI World Tour's ProTeams were entitled, and obliged, to enter. In April 2012, the organizer of the Tour, Amaury Sport Organisation (ASO), announced the four UCI Professional Continental teams given wildcard invitations, of which three were French-based (Team Europcar, Cofidis and Saur–Sojasun) and one Dutch (Argos–Shimano). The presentation of the teams – where each team's roster are introduced in front of the media and local dignitaries – took place outside the Prince-Bishops' Palace in Liège, two days before the first stage.

Each squad was allowed a maximum of nine riders, resulting in a start list total of 198 riders. Of these, 35 were riding the Tour de France for the first time. From the riders that began the race, 153 crossed the finish line in Paris. The average rider age was 30.17, with 22-year-old Thibaut Pinot (FDJ–BigMat) as the youngest rider, and 40-year-old Jens Voigt (RadioShack–Nissan) the oldest. Of the total average ages, Saur–Sojasun was the youngest team and RadioShack–Nissan the oldest. The riders came from 31 countries; France, Spain, Netherlands, Italy, Belgium, Germany and Australia all had 12 or more riders in the race. Riders from six countries won at least one stage; British riders won the largest number of stages, a total of seven.

Fabian Cancellara (RadioShack–Nissan) won the prologue and held the general classification leader's yellow jersey for the first week. Team Sky's Bradley Wiggins, second in the prologue, took the leadership of the race on stage seven, the first mountainous stage. He maintained his lead for the remainder of the race, winning the two longest time trials, and not losing time to his main challengers for the overall title in the mountains. Wiggins's teammate Chris Froome placed second, and Vincenzo Nibali (Liquigas–Cannondale) was third. The points classification was won by Nibali's teammate Peter Sagan, who won three stages. Team Europcar's Thomas Voeckler, winner of two mountain stages, won the mountains classification, and BMC Racing Team's Tejay van Garderen, in fifth place overall, won the award for the best young rider. The team classification was won by RadioShack–Nissan, and Chris Anker Sørensen (Saxo Bank–Tinkoff Bank) was given the award for the most combative rider.

== Teams ==
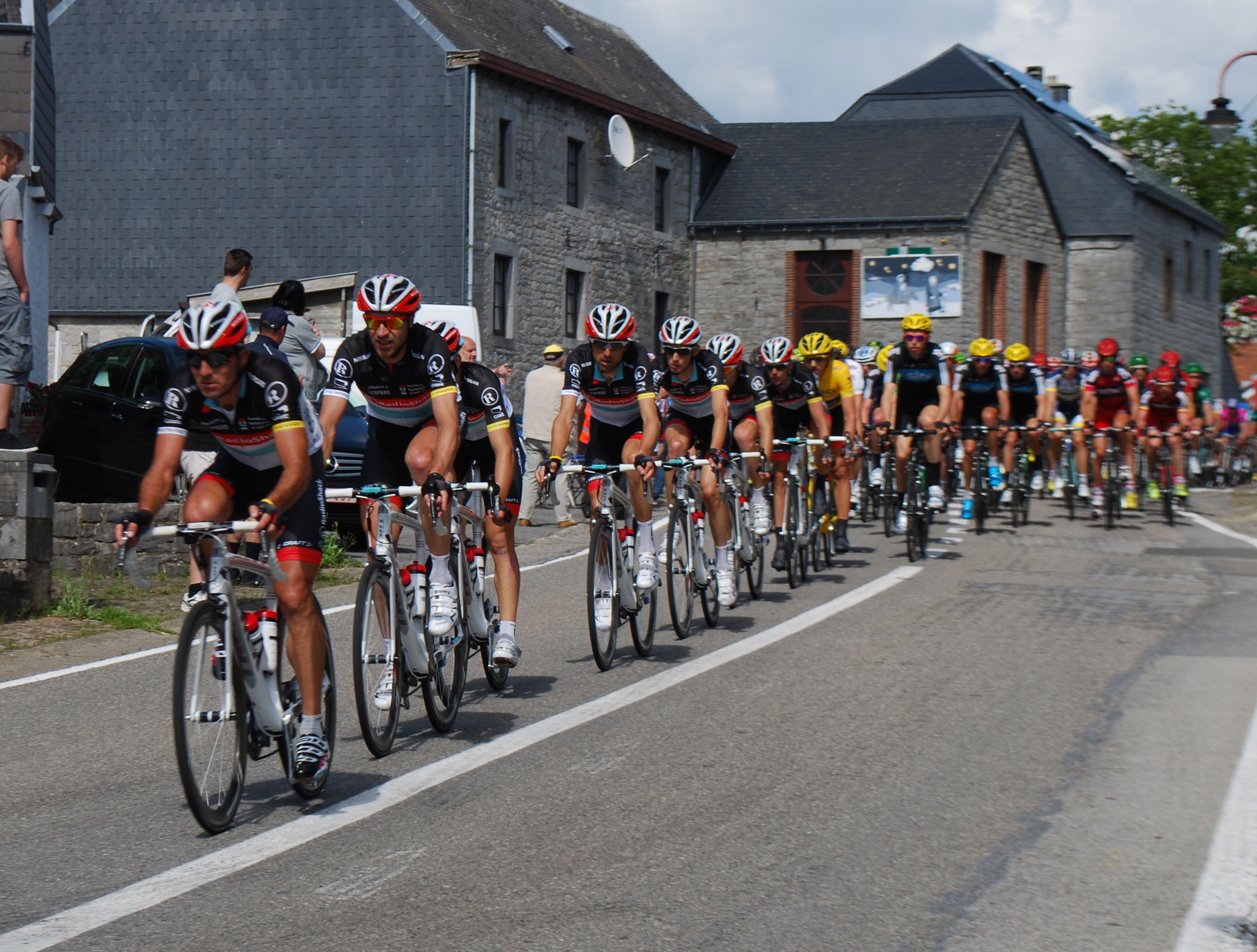
The team classification winners RadioShack–Nissan leading the peloton on stage one.

ProTeams

- BMC Racing Team (riders)
- RadioShack–Nissan (riders)
- Euskaltel–Euskadi (riders)
- Lampre–ISD (riders)
- Liquigas–Cannondale (riders)
- Garmin–Sharp (riders)
- Ag2r–La Mondiale (riders)
- Team Sky (riders)
- Lotto–Belisol (riders)
- Vacansoleil–DCM (riders)
- Team Katusha (riders)
- FDJ–BigMat (riders)
- Rabobank (riders)
- Movistar Team (riders)
- Saxo Bank–Tinkoff Bank (riders)
- Astana (riders)
- Omega Pharma–Quick-Step (riders)
- Orica–GreenEDGE (riders)

Professional Continental teams

- Team Europcar (riders)
- Cofidis (riders)
- Saur–Sojasun (riders)
- Argos–Shimano (riders)

== Cyclists ==
Legend
| No. | Starting number worn by the rider during the Tour |
| Pos. | Position in the general classification |
| Time | Deficit to the winner of the general classification |
| ‡ | Denotes riders born on or after 1 January 1987 eligible for the young rider classification |
| A yellow jersey. | Denotes the winner of the general classification |
| A green jersey. | Denotes the winner of the points classification |
| A white jersey with red polka dots. | Denotes the winner of the mountains classification |
| A white jersey. | Denotes the winner of the young rider classification (eligibility indicated by ‡) |
| A white jersey with a yellow number bib. | Denotes riders that represent the winner of the team classification |
| A white jersey with a red number bib. | Denotes the winner of the super-combativity award |
| DNS | Denotes a rider who did not start a stage, followed by the stage before which he withdrew |
| DNF | Denotes a rider who did not finish a stage, followed by the stage in which he withdrew |
| HD | Denotes a rider who finished outside the time limit, followed by the stage in which he did so (French: Hors delai) |
| DSQ | Denotes a rider who was disqualified from the race |
Age correct as of 30 June 2012, the date on which the Tour began

=== By starting number ===
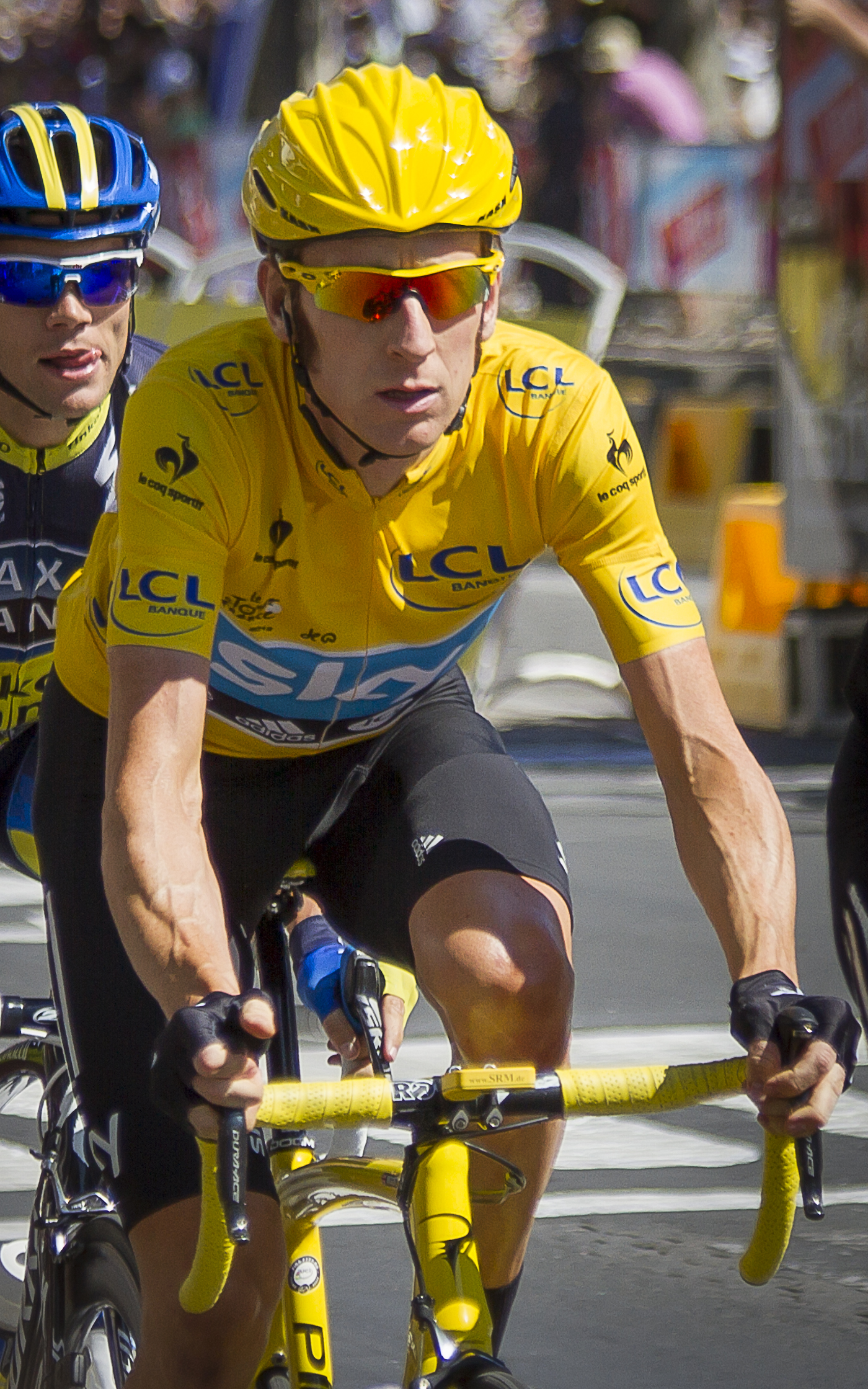
Team Sky rider Bradley Wiggins won the general classification.

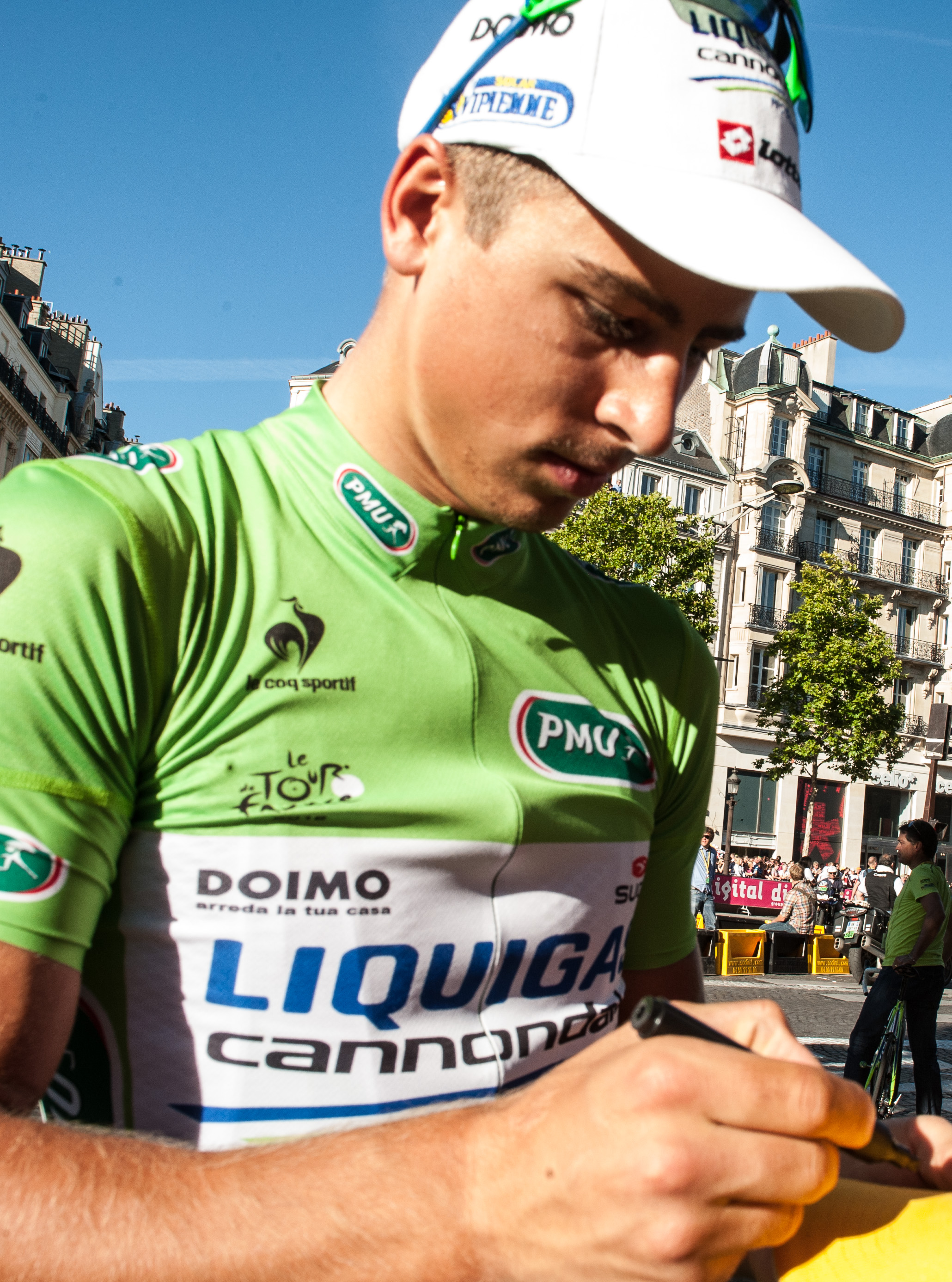
Liquigas–Cannondale rider Peter Sagan won the points classification.

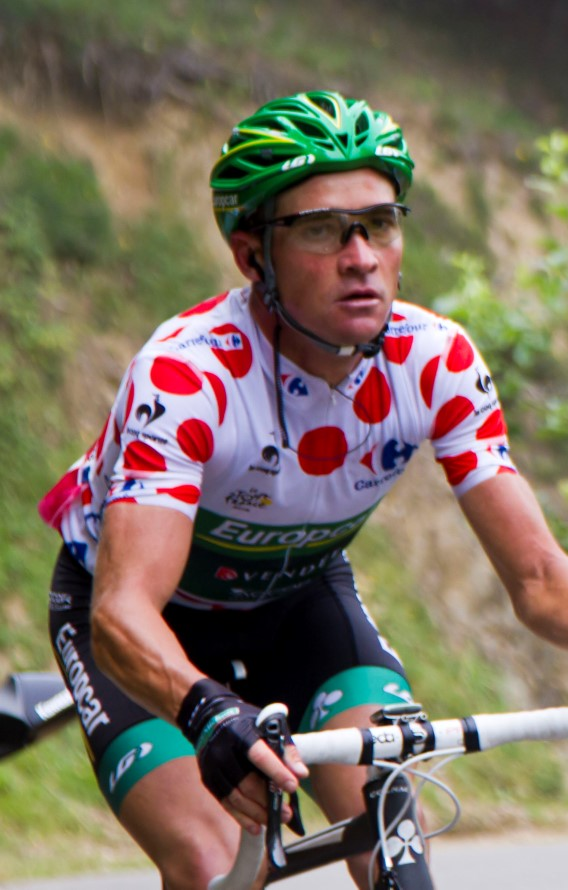
Team Europcar rider Thomas Voeckler won the mountains classification.

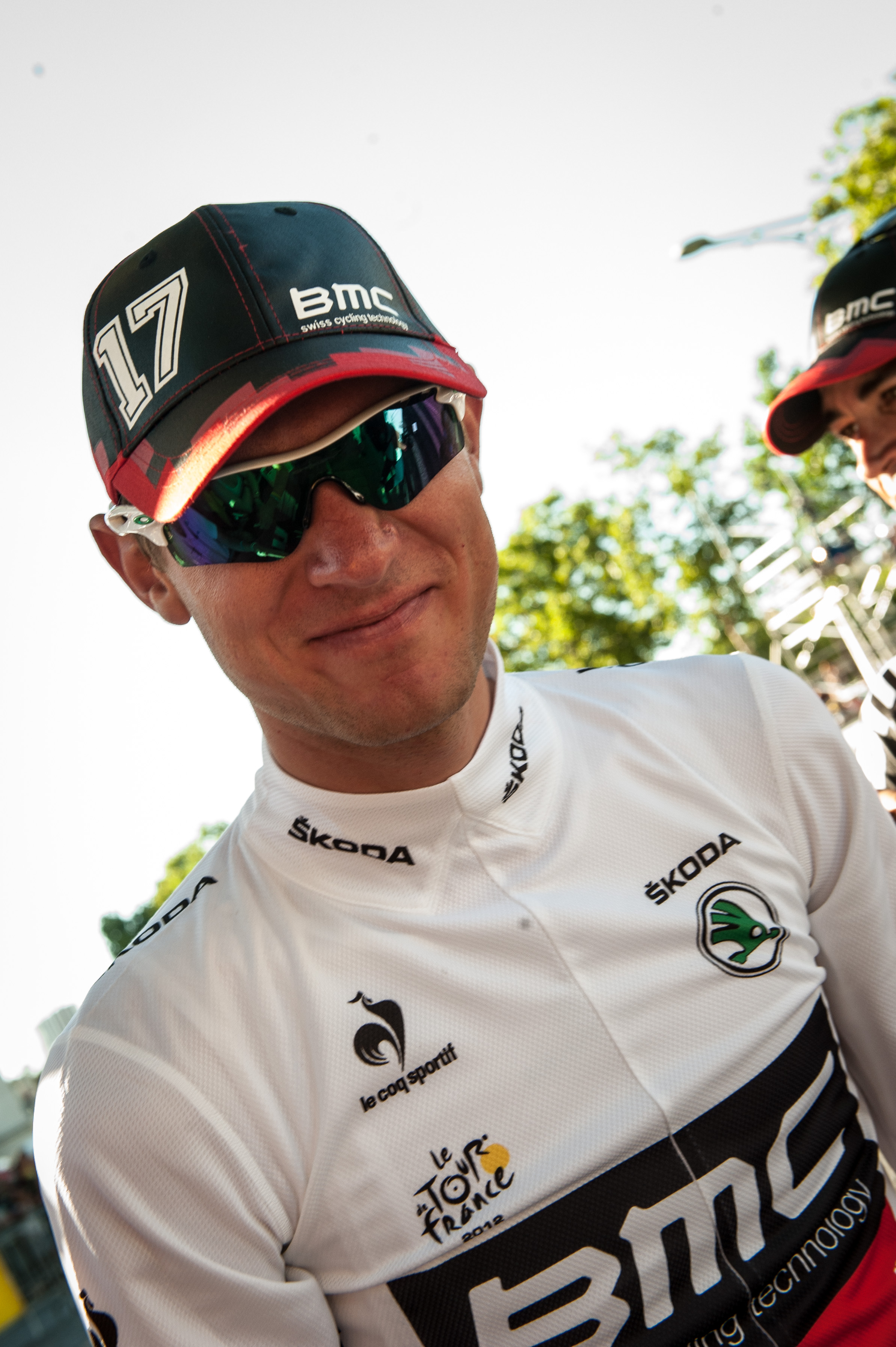
BMC Racing Team rider Tejay van Garderen won the young rider classification.

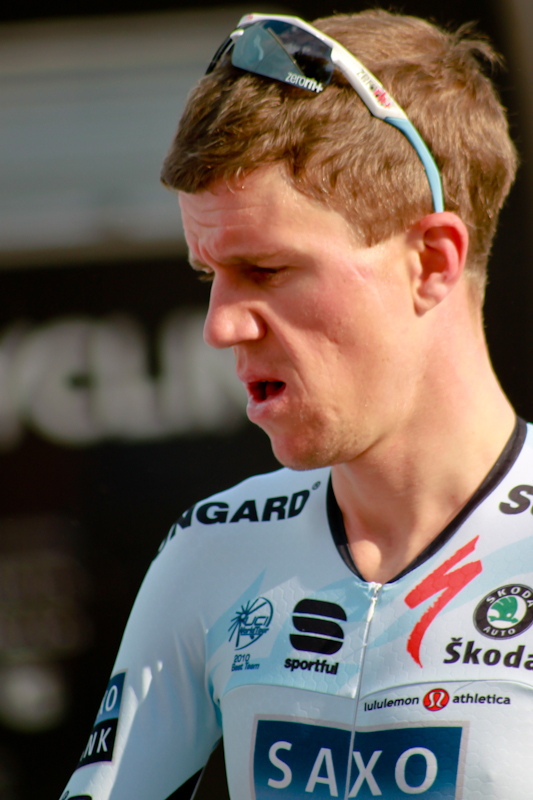
Saxo Bank–Tinkoff Bank rider Chris Anker Sørensen (pictured in 2011) won the super-combativity award.

| No. | Rider | Nationality | Team | Age | Pos. | Time | Ref |
|---|---|---|---|---|---|---|---|
| 1 | Cadel Evans | Australia | BMC Racing Team | 35 | 7 | + 15' 49″ | |
| 2 | Marcus Burghardt | Germany | BMC Racing Team | 29 | 58 | + 1h 57' 39" | |
| 3 | Steve Cummings | Great Britain | BMC Racing Team | 31 | 95 | + 2h 47' 03" | |
| 4 | Philippe Gilbert | Belgium | BMC Racing Team | 29 | 46 | + 1h 41' 35" | |
| 5 | George Hincapie | United States | BMC Racing Team | 39 | 38 | + 1h 30' 38" | |
| 6 | Amaël Moinard | France | BMC Racing Team | 30 | 45 | + 1h 41' 00" | |
| 7 | Manuel Quinziato | Italy | BMC Racing Team | 32 | 109 | + 2h 56' 27" | |
| 8 | Michael Schär | Switzerland | BMC Racing Team | 25 | 49 | + 1h 43' 53" | |
| 9 | Tejay van Garderen ‡ | United States | BMC Racing Team | 23 | 5 | + 11' 04″ | |
| 11 | Fränk Schleck | Luxembourg | RadioShack–Nissan | 28 | DNS-16 | — | |
| 12 | Fabian Cancellara | Switzerland | RadioShack–Nissan | 31 | DNS-11 | — | |
| 13 | Tony Gallopin ‡ | France | RadioShack–Nissan | 24 | DNF-13 | — | |
| 14 | Chris Horner | United States | RadioShack–Nissan | 40 | 13 | + 19' 55" | |
| 15 | Andreas Klöden | Germany | RadioShack–Nissan | 37 | 11 | + 17' 54" | |
| 16 | Maxime Monfort | Belgium | RadioShack–Nissan | 29 | 16 | + 28' 30" | |
| 17 | Yaroslav Popovych | Ukraine | RadioShack–Nissan | 32 | 76 | + 2h 21' 56" | |
| 18 | Jens Voigt | Germany | RadioShack–Nissan | 40 | 52 | + 1h 50' 41" | |
| 19 | Haimar Zubeldia | Spain | RadioShack–Nissan | 35 | 6 | + 15' 41″ | |
| 21 | Thomas Voeckler | France | Team Europcar | 33 | 26 | + 1h 04' 41" | |
| 22 | Yukiya Arashiro | Japan | Team Europcar | 27 | 84 | + 2h 29' 13" | |
| 23 | Giovanni Bernaudeau | France | Team Europcar | 28 | DNF-15 | — | |
| 24 | Cyril Gautier ‡ | France | Team Europcar | 24 | 61 | + 1h 58' 55" | |
| 25 | Yohann Gène | France | Team Europcar | 31 | 139 | + 3h 26' 58" | |
| 26 | Vincent Jérôme | France | Team Europcar | 27 | DNF-15 | — | |
| 27 | Christophe Kern | France | Team Europcar | 31 | 83 | + 2h 29' 01" | |
| 28 | Davide Malacarne ‡ | Italy | Team Europcar | 24 | 59 | + 1h 57' 45" | |
| 29 | Pierre Rolland | France | Team Europcar | 25 | 8 | + 16' 26″ | |
| 31 | Samuel Sánchez | Spain | Euskaltel–Euskadi | 34 | DNF-8 | — | |
| 32 | Mikel Astarloza | Spain | Euskaltel–Euskadi | 32 | DNF-6 | — | |
| 33 | Jorge Azanza | Spain | Euskaltel–Euskadi | 30 | 74 | + 2h 18' 58" | |
| 34 | Gorka Izagirre ‡ | Spain | Euskaltel–Euskadi | 24 | 39 | + 1h 32' 19" | |
| 35 | Egoi Martínez | Spain | Euskaltel–Euskadi | 34 | 17 | + 31' 46" | |
| 36 | Rubén Pérez | Spain | Euskaltel–Euskadi | 30 | 87 | + 2h 37' 56" | |
| 37 | Amets Txurruka | Spain | Euskaltel–Euskadi | 29 | DNS-7 | — | |
| 38 | Pablo Urtasun | Spain | Euskaltel–Euskadi | 29 | 134 | + 3h 21' 34" | |
| 39 | Gorka Verdugo | Spain | Euskaltel–Euskadi | 33 | DNF-8 | — | |
| 41 | Michele Scarponi | Italy | Lampre–ISD | 33 | 24 | + 58' 37" | |
| 42 | Grega Bole | Slovenia | Lampre–ISD | 26 | DNF-16 | — | |
| 43 | Danilo Hondo | Germany | Lampre–ISD | 38 | 86 | + 2h 37' 55" | |
| 44 | Yuriy Krivtsov | France | Lampre–ISD | 33 | HD-11 | — | |
| 45 | Matthew Lloyd | Australia | Lampre–ISD | 29 | DNS-10 | — | |
| 46 | Marco Marzano | Italy | Lampre–ISD | 32 | 80 | + 2h 24' 46" | |
| 47 | Alessandro Petacchi | Italy | Lampre–ISD | 38 | HD-11 | — | |
| 48 | Simone Stortoni | Italy | Lampre–ISD | 26 | 69 | + 2h 13' 39" | |
| 49 | Davide Viganò | Italy | Lampre–ISD | 28 | DNF-6 | — | |
| 51 | Vincenzo Nibali | Italy | Liquigas–Cannondale | 27 | 3 | + 6' 19″ | |
| 52 | Ivan Basso | Italy | Liquigas–Cannondale | 34 | 25 | + 59' 44" | |
| 53 | Federico Canuti | Italy | Liquigas–Cannondale | 26 | 114 | + 2h 58' 41" | |
| 54 | Kristijan Koren | Slovenia | Liquigas–Cannondale | 25 | 98 | + 2h 51' 34" | |
| 55 | Dominik Nerz ‡ | Germany | Liquigas–Cannondale | 22 | 47 | + 1h 42' 12" | |
| 56 | Daniel Oss ‡ | Italy | Liquigas–Cannondale | 25 | 105 | + 2h 55' 24" | |
| 57 | Peter Sagan ‡ | Slovakia | Liquigas–Cannondale | 22 | 42 | + 1h 38' 37" | |
| 58 | Sylwester Szmyd | Poland | Liquigas–Cannondale | 34 | 71 | + 2h 16' 15" | |
| 59 | Alessandro Vanotti | Italy | Liquigas–Cannondale | 31 | 118 | + 3h 04' 39" | |
| 61 | Ryder Hesjedal | Canada | Garmin–Sharp | 31 | DNS-7 | — | |
| 62 | Tom Danielson | United States | Garmin–Sharp | 34 | DNF-6 | — | |
| 63 | Tyler Farrar | United States | Garmin–Sharp | 28 | 151 | + 3h 54' 45" | |
| 64 | Robert Hunter | South Africa | Garmin–Sharp | 35 | DNS-7 | — | |
| 65 | Dan Martin | Ireland | Garmin–Sharp | 25 | 35 | + 1h 25' 23" | |
| 66 | David Millar | Great Britain | Garmin–Sharp | 35 | 106 | + 2h 55' 24" | |
| 67 | Johan Vansummeren | Belgium | Garmin–Sharp | 31 | 147 | + 3h 40' 01" | |
| 68 | Christian Vande Velde | United States | Garmin–Sharp | 36 | 60 | + 1h 58' 38" | |
| 69 | David Zabriskie | United States | Garmin–Sharp | 33 | 100 | + 2h 53' 26" | |
| 71 | Jean-Christophe Péraud | France | Ag2r–La Mondiale | 35 | 44 | + 1h 40' 44" | |
| 72 | Maxime Bouet | France | Ag2r–La Mondiale | 25 | 55 | + 1h 52' 30" | |
| 73 | Mikaël Cherel | France | Ag2r–La Mondiale | 26 | 62 | + 1h 59' 53" | |
| 74 | Hubert Dupont | France | Ag2r–La Mondiale | 31 | DNS-7 | — | |
| 75 | Sébastien Hinault | France | Ag2r–La Mondiale | 38 | 122 | + 3h 08' 57" | |
| 76 | Blel Kadri | France | Ag2r–La Mondiale | 25 | 89 | + 2h 41' 14" | |
| 77 | Sébastien Minard | France | Ag2r–La Mondiale | 30 | 65 | + 2h 06' 32" | |
| 78 | Christophe Riblon | France | Ag2r–La Mondiale | 31 | 73 | + 2h 17' 31" | |
| 79 | Nicolas Roche | Ireland | Ag2r–La Mondiale | 27 | 12 | + 19' 33" | |
| 81 | Rein Taaramäe ‡ | Estonia | Cofidis | 25 | 36 | + 1h 27' 52" | |
| 82 | Rémy Di Gregorio | France | Cofidis | 26 | DNS-10 | — | |
| 83 | Samuel Dumoulin | France | Cofidis | 31 | 107 | + 2h 56' 02" | |
| 84 | Nicolas Edet ‡ | France | Cofidis | 24 | 128 | + 3h 17' 16" | |
| 85 | Julien Fouchard | France | Cofidis | 25 | 149 | + 3h 42' 31" | |
| 86 | Jan Ghyselinck ‡ | Belgium | Cofidis | 24 | 152 | + 3h 57' 04" | |
| 87 | Luis Ángel Maté | Spain | Cofidis | 28 | 130 | + 3h 18' 11" | |
| 88 | David Moncoutié | France | Cofidis | 37 | DNF-12 | — | |
| 89 | Romain Zingle ‡ | Belgium | Cofidis | 25 | 90 | + 2h 41' 44" | |
| 91 | Jérôme Coppel | France | Saur–Sojasun | 25 | 21 | + 45' 43" | |
| 92 | Anthony Delaplace ‡ | France | Saur–Sojasun | 22 | DNF-7 | — | |
| 93 | Jimmy Engoulvent | France | Saur–Sojasun | 32 | 153 | + 3h 57' 36" | |
| 94 | Brice Feillu | France | Saur–Sojasun | 26 | 91 | + 2h 41' 50" | |
| 95 | Fabrice Jeandesboz | France | Saur–Sojasun | 27 | 54 | + 1h 52' 28" | |
| 96 | Cyril Lemoine | France | Saur–Sojasun | 29 | 136 | + 3h 23' 55" | |
| 97 | Guillaume Levarlet | France | Saur–Sojasun | 26 | 75 | + 2h 19' 43" | |
| 98 | Jean-Marc Marino | France | Saur–Sojasun | 28 | 131 | + 3h 18' 20" | |
| 99 | Julien Simon | France | Saur–Sojasun | 26 | 92 | + 2h 46' 04" | |
| 101 | Bradley Wiggins | Great Britain | Team Sky | 28 | 1 | 87h 34' 47" | |
| 102 | Edvald Boasson Hagen ‡ | Norway | Team Sky | 25 | 56 | + 1h 52' 34" | |
| 103 | Mark Cavendish | Great Britain | Team Sky | 27 | 142 | + 3h 27' 49" | |
| 104 | Bernhard Eisel | Austria | Team Sky | 31 | 146 | + 3h 38' 48" | |
| 105 | Chris Froome | Great Britain | Team Sky | 27 | 2 | + 3' 21″ | |
| 106 | Christian Knees | Germany | Team Sky | 31 | 82 | + 2h 26' 43" | |
| 107 | Richie Porte | Australia | Team Sky | 27 | 34 | + 1h 20' 49" | |
| 108 | Michael Rogers | Australia | Team Sky | 32 | 23 | + 54' 52" | |
| 109 | Kanstantsin Sivtsov | Belarus | Team Sky | 29 | DNF-3 | — | |
| 111 | Jurgen Van den Broeck | Belgium | Lotto–Belisol | 29 | 4 | + 10' 15″ | |
| 112 | Lars Bak | Denmark | Lotto–Belisol | 31 | 96 | + 2h 48' 05" | |
| 113 | Francis De Greef | Belgium | Lotto–Belisol | 27 | 102 | + 2h 53' 52" | |
| 114 | André Greipel | Germany | Lotto–Belisol | 29 | 123 | + 3h 09' 02" | |
| 115 | Adam Hansen | Australia | Lotto–Belisol | 31 | 81 | + 2h 25' 29" | |
| 116 | Greg Henderson | New Zealand | Lotto–Belisol | 35 | 124 | + 3h 13' 06" | |
| 117 | Jürgen Roelandts | Belgium | Lotto–Belisol | 26 | 104 | + 2h 55' 04" | |
| 118 | Marcel Sieberg | Germany | Lotto–Belisol | 30 | 132 | + 3h 19' 36" | |
| 119 | Jelle Vanendert | Belgium | Lotto–Belisol | 27 | 29 | + 1h 08' 26" | |
| 121 | Lieuwe Westra | Netherlands | Vacansoleil–DCM | 29 | DNF-11 | — | |
| 122 | Kris Boeckmans ‡ | Belgium | Vacansoleil–DCM | 25 | 115 | + 3h 02' 57" | |
| 123 | Johnny Hoogerland | Netherlands | Vacansoleil–DCM | 29 | 67 | + 2h 11' 36" | |
| 124 | Gustav Larsson | Sweden | Vacansoleil–DCM | 31 | DNF-11 | — | |
| 125 | Marco Marcato | Italy | Vacansoleil–DCM | 28 | 57 | + 1h 55' 30" | |
| 126 | Wout Poels ‡ | Netherlands | Vacansoleil–DCM | 24 | DNF-6 | — | |
| 127 | Rob Ruijgh | Netherlands | Vacansoleil–DCM | 25 | DNF-11 | — | |
| 128 | Rafael Valls ‡ | Spain | Vacansoleil–DCM | 25 | 41 | + 1h 37' 57" | |
| 129 | Kenny van Hummel | Netherlands | Vacansoleil–DCM | 29 | DNF-15 | — | |
| 131 | Denis Menchov | Russia | Team Katusha | 34 | DSQ (Note: In July 2014, Denis Menchov was retroactively disqualified from the 2012 Tour de France by cycling's governing body, Union Cycliste Internationale, for "abnormalities in his biological passport". The riders positioned below Menchov were not upgraded.) | ~~+ 27' 22"~~ | |
| 132 | Giampaolo Caruso | Italy | Team Katusha | 31 | 37 | + 1h 28' 32" | |
| 133 | Óscar Freire | Spain | Team Katusha | 36 | DNS-7 | — | |
| 134 | Vladimir Gusev | Russia | Team Katusha | 29 | DNF-16 | — | |
| 135 | Joan Horrach | Spain | Team Katusha | 38 | 119 | + 3h 06' 27" | |
| 136 | Aleksandr Kuschynski | Belarus | Team Katusha | 32 | 145 | + 3h 38' 24" | |
| 137 | Luca Paolini | Italy | Team Katusha | 35 | 108 | + 2h 56' 21" | |
| 138 | Yuri Trofimov | Russia | Team Katusha | 28 | 51 | + 1h 47' 31" | |
| 139 | Eduard Vorganov | Russia | Team Katusha | 29 | 19 | + 38' 16" | |
| 141 | Sandy Casar | France | FDJ–BigMat | 33 | 22 | + 46' 52" | |
| 142 | Pierrick Fédrigo | France | FDJ–BigMat | 33 | 48 | + 1h 42' 39" | |
| 143 | Yauheni Hutarovich | Belarus | FDJ–BigMat | 28 | DNF-15 | — | |
| 144 | Mathieu Ladagnous | France | FDJ–BigMat | 27 | 85 | + 2h 33' 14" | |
| 145 | Cédric Pineau | France | FDJ–BigMat | 27 | 133 | + 3h 20' 24" | |
| 146 | Thibaut Pinot ‡ | France | FDJ–BigMat | 22 | 10 | + 17' 17″ | |
| 147 | Anthony Roux ‡ | France | FDJ–BigMat | 25 | 126 | + 3h 16' 38" | |
| 148 | Jérémy Roy | France | FDJ–BigMat | 29 | 66 | + 2h 10' 17" | |
| 149 | Arthur Vichot ‡ | France | FDJ–BigMat | 23 | 94 | + 2h 46' 51" | |
| 151 | Robert Gesink | Netherlands | Rabobank | 26 | DNS-12 | — | |
| 152 | Steven Kruijswijk ‡ | Netherlands | Rabobank | 25 | 33 | + 1h 16' 52" | |
| 153 | Bauke Mollema | Netherlands | Rabobank | 25 | DNF-11 | — | |
| 154 | Mark Renshaw | Australia | Rabobank | 29 | DNF-11 | — | |
| 155 | Luis León Sánchez | Spain | Rabobank | 28 | 64 | + 2h 05' 43" | |
| 156 | Bram Tankink | Netherlands | Rabobank | 33 | 144 | + 3h 31' 24" | |
| 157 | Laurens ten Dam | Netherlands | Rabobank | 31 | 28 | + 1h 05' 39" | |
| 158 | Maarten Tjallingii | Netherlands | Rabobank | 34 | DNS-4 | — | |
| 159 | Maarten Wynants | Belgium | Rabobank | 30 | DNS-7 | — | |
| 161 | Alejandro Valverde | Spain | Movistar Team | 32 | 20 | + 42' 26" | |
| 162 | Juan José Cobo | Spain | Movistar Team | 30 | 30 | + 1h 09' 19" | |
| 163 | Rui Costa | Portugal | Movistar Team | 25 | 18 | + 37' 03" | |
| 164 | Imanol Erviti | Spain | Movistar Team | 28 | DNS-7 | — | |
| 165 | Iván Gutiérrez | Spain | Movistar Team | 33 | DNS-7 | — | |
| 166 | Vladimir Karpets | Russia | Movistar Team | 31 | 53 | + 1h 51' 43" | |
| 167 | Vasil Kiryienka | Belarus | Movistar Team | 31 | 77 | + 2h 22' 02" | |
| 168 | Rubén Plaza | Spain | Movistar Team | 32 | 101 | + 2h 53' 35" | |
| 169 | José Joaquín Rojas | Spain | Movistar Team | 27 | DNF-3 | — | |
| 171 | Jonathan Cantwell | Australia | Saxo Bank–Tinkoff Bank | 30 | 137 | + 3h 25' 08" | |
| 172 | Juan José Haedo | Argentina | Saxo Bank–Tinkoff Bank | 31 | 140 | + 3h 27' 28" | |
| 173 | Karsten Kroon | Netherlands | Saxo Bank–Tinkoff Bank | 36 | 143 | + 3h 28' 56" | |
| 174 | Anders Lund | Denmark | Saxo Bank–Tinkoff Bank | 27 | 127 | + 3h 17' 07" | |
| 175 | Michael Mørkøv | Denmark | Saxo Bank–Tinkoff Bank | 27 | 93 | + 2h 46' 14" | |
| 176 | Nick Nuyens | Belgium | Saxo Bank–Tinkoff Bank | 32 | 121 | + 3h 08' 29" | |
| 177 | Sérgio Paulinho | Portugal | Saxo Bank–Tinkoff Bank | 32 | 50 | + 1h 47' 14" | |
| 178 | Chris Anker Sørensen | Denmark | Saxo Bank–Tinkoff Bank | 27 | 14 | + 25' 27" | |
| 179 | Nicki Sørensen | Denmark | Saxo Bank–Tinkoff Bank | 37 | 99 | + 2h 53' 11" | |
| 181 | Janez Brajkovič | Slovenia | Astana | 28 | 9 | + 16' 33″ | |
| 182 | Borut Božič | Slovenia | Astana | 31 | 129 | + 3h 17' 44" | |
| 183 | Dmitry Fofonov | Kazakhstan | Astana | 35 | 63 | + 2h 03' 55" | |
| 184 | Andriy Hrivko | Ukraine | Astana | 28 | 43 | + 1h 38' 41" | |
| 185 | Maxim Iglinsky | Kazakhstan | Astana | 31 | 116 | + 3h 03' 38" | |
| 186 | Andrey Kashechkin | Kazakhstan | Astana | 32 | 78 | + 2h 23' 09" | |
| 187 | Fredrik Kessiakoff | Sweden | Astana | 32 | 40 | + 1h 34' 33" | |
| 188 | Robert Kišerlovski | Croatia | Astana | 25 | DNF-14 | — | |
| 189 | Alexander Vinokourov | Kazakhstan | Astana | 38 | 31 | + 1h 15' 21" | |
| 191 | Levi Leipheimer | United States | Omega Pharma–Quick-Step | 38 | 32 | + 1h 16' 29" | |
| 192 | Sylvain Chavanel | France | Omega Pharma–Quick-Step | 33 | DNF-15 | — | |
| 193 | Kevin De Weert | Belgium | Omega Pharma–Quick-Step | 30 | 68 | + 2h 12' 22" | |
| 194 | Dries Devenyns | Belgium | Omega Pharma–Quick-Step | 28 | 70 | + 2h 13' 49" | |
| 195 | Bert Grabsch | Germany | Omega Pharma–Quick-Step | 37 | 125 | + 3h 13' 06" | |
| 196 | Tony Martin | Germany | Omega Pharma–Quick-Step | 27 | DNS-10 | — | |
| 197 | Jérôme Pineau | France | Omega Pharma–Quick-Step | 32 | 112 | + 2h 57' 58" | |
| 198 | Martin Velits | Slovakia | Omega Pharma–Quick-Step | 27 | 88 | + 2h 40' 47" | |
| 199 | Peter Velits | Slovakia | Omega Pharma–Quick-Step | 27 | 27 | + 1h 05' 10" | |
| 201 | Simon Gerrans | Australia | Orica–GreenEDGE | 32 | 79 | + 2h 24' 35" | |
| 202 | Michael Albasini | Switzerland | Orica–GreenEDGE | 31 | 110 | + 2h 57' 20" | |
| 203 | Baden Cooke | Australia | Orica–GreenEDGE | 33 | 117 | + 3h 04' 30" | |
| 204 | Matthew Goss | Australia | Orica–GreenEDGE | 25 | 120 | + 3h 06' 55" | |
| 205 | Daryl Impey | South Africa | Orica–GreenEDGE | 27 | 111 | + 2h 57' 29" | |
| 206 | Brett Lancaster | Australia | Orica–GreenEDGE | 32 | DNF-15 | — | |
| 207 | Sebastian Langeveld | Netherlands | Orica–GreenEDGE | 27 | 150 | + 3h 50' 12" | |
| 208 | Stuart O'Grady | Australia | Orica–GreenEDGE | 38 | 97 | + 2h 50' 31" | |
| 209 | Pieter Weening | Netherlands | Orica–GreenEDGE | 31 | 72 | + 2h 17' 30" | |
| 211 | Marcel Kittel ‡ | Germany | Argos–Shimano | 24 | DNF-5 | — | |
| 212 | Roy Curvers | Netherlands | Argos–Shimano | 32 | 135 | + 3h 23' 44" | |
| 213 | Koen de Kort | Netherlands | Argos–Shimano | 29 | 103 | + 2h 54' 13" | |
| 214 | Johannes Fröhlinger | Germany | Argos–Shimano | 27 | DNS-8 | — | |
| 215 | Patrick Gretsch ‡ | Germany | Argos–Shimano | 25 | 141 | + 3h 28' 36" | |
| 216 | Yann Huguet | France | Argos–Shimano | 28 | 138 | + 3h 26' 43" | |
| 217 | Matthieu Sprick | France | Argos–Shimano | 30 | 113 | + 2h 58' 15" | |
| 218 | Albert Timmer | Netherlands | Argos–Shimano | 27 | 148 | + 3h 40' 37" | |
| 219 | Tom Veelers | Netherlands | Argos–Shimano | 27 | DNF-12 | — | |

=== By team ===
BMC Racing Team (BMC)
| No. | Rider | Pos. |
|---|---|---|
| 1 | Cadel Evans (AUS) | 7 |
| 2 | Marcus Burghardt (GER) | 58 |
| 3 | Steve Cummings (GBR) | 95 |
| 4 | Philippe Gilbert (BEL) | 46 |
| 5 | George Hincapie (USA) | 38 |
| 6 | Amaël Moinard (FRA) | 45 |
| 7 | Manuel Quinziato (ITA) | 109 |
| 8 | Michael Schär (SUI) | 49 |
| 9 | Tejay van Garderen (USA) ‡ | 5 |
Directeur sportif: John Lelangue

RadioShack–Nissan (RNT)
| No. | Rider | Pos. |
|---|---|---|
| 11 | Fränk Schleck (LUX) | DNS-16 |
| 12 | Fabian Cancellara (SUI) | DNS-11 |
| 13 | Tony Gallopin (FRA) ‡ | DNF-13 |
| 14 | Chris Horner (USA) | 13 |
| 15 | Andreas Klöden (GER) | 11 |
| 16 | Maxime Monfort (BEL) | 16 |
| 17 | Yaroslav Popovych (UKR) | 76 |
| 18 | Jens Voigt (GER) | 52 |
| 19 | Haimar Zubeldia (ESP) | 6 |
Directeur sportif: Alain Gallopin

Team Europcar (EUC)
| No. | Rider | Pos. |
|---|---|---|
| 21 | Thomas Voeckler (FRA) | 26 |
| 22 | Yukiya Arashiro (JPN) | 84 |
| 23 | Giovanni Bernaudeau (FRA) | DNF-15 |
| 24 | Cyril Gautier (FRA) ‡ | 61 |
| 25 | Yohann Gène (FRA) | 139 |
| 26 | Vincent Jérôme (FRA) | DNF-15 |
| 27 | Christophe Kern (FRA) | 83 |
| 28 | Davide Malacarne (ITA) ‡ | 59 |
| 29 | Pierre Rolland (FRA) | 8 |
Directeur sportif: Dominique Arnould

Euskaltel–Euskadi (EUS)
| No. | Rider | Pos. |
|---|---|---|
| 31 | Samuel Sánchez (ESP) | DNF-8 |
| 32 | Mikel Astarloza (ESP) | DNF-6 |
| 33 | Jorge Azanza (ESP) | 74 |
| 34 | Gorka Izagirre (ESP) ‡ | 39 |
| 35 | Egoi Martínez (ESP) | 17 |
| 36 | Rubén Pérez (ESP) | 87 |
| 37 | Amets Txurruka (ESP) | DNS-7 |
| 38 | Pablo Urtasun (ESP) | 134 |
| 39 | Gorka Verdugo (ESP) | DNF-8 |
Directeur sportif: Gorka Gerrikagoitia

Lampre–ISD (LAM)
| No. | Rider | Pos. |
|---|---|---|
| 41 | Michele Scarponi (ITA) | 24 |
| 42 | Grega Bole (SLO) | DNF-16 |
| 43 | Danilo Hondo (GER) | 86 |
| 44 | Yuriy Krivtsov (FRA) | HD-11 |
| 45 | Matthew Lloyd (AUS) | DNS-10 |
| 46 | Marco Marzano (ITA) | 80 |
| 47 | Alessandro Petacchi (ITA) | HD-11 |
| 48 | Simone Stortoni (ITA) | 69 |
| 49 | Davide Viganò (ITA) | DNF-6 |
Directeur sportif: Maurizio Piovani

Liquigas–Cannondale (LIQ)
| No. | Rider | Pos. |
|---|---|---|
| 51 | Vincenzo Nibali (ITA) | 3 |
| 52 | Ivan Basso (ITA) | 25 |
| 53 | Federico Canuti (ITA) | 114 |
| 54 | Kristijan Koren (SLO) | 98 |
| 55 | Dominik Nerz (GER) ‡ | 47 |
| 56 | Daniel Oss (ITA) ‡ | 105 |
| 57 | Peter Sagan (SVK) ‡ | 42 |
| 58 | Sylwester Szmyd (POL) | 71 |
| 59 | Alessandro Vanotti (ITA) | 118 |
Directeur sportif: Mario Scirea

Garmin–Sharp (GRS)
| No. | Rider | Pos. |
|---|---|---|
| 61 | Ryder Hesjedal (CAN) | DNS-7 |
| 62 | Tom Danielson (USA) | DNF-6 |
| 63 | Tyler Farrar (USA) | 151 |
| 64 | Robert Hunter (RSA) | DNS-7 |
| 65 | Dan Martin (IRE) | 35 |
| 66 | David Millar (GBR) | 106 |
| 67 | Johan Vansummeren (BEL) | 147 |
| 68 | Christian Vande Velde (USA) | 60 |
| 69 | David Zabriskie (USA) | 100 |
Directeur sportif: Jonathan Vaughters

Ag2r–La Mondiale (ALM)
| No. | Rider | Pos. |
|---|---|---|
| 71 | Jean-Christophe Péraud (FRA) | 44 |
| 72 | Maxime Bouet (FRA) | 55 |
| 73 | Mikaël Cherel (FRA) | 62 |
| 74 | Hubert Dupont (FRA) | 31 |
| 75 | Sébastien Hinault (FRA) | 122 |
| 76 | Blel Kadri (FRA) | 89 |
| 77 | Sébastien Minard (FRA) | 65 |
| 78 | Christophe Riblon (FRA) | 73 |
| 79 | Nicolas Roche (IRL) | 12 |
Directeur sportif: Vincent Lavenu

Cofidis (COF)
| No. | Rider | Pos. |
|---|---|---|
| 81 | Rein Taaramäe (EST) ‡ | 36 |
| 82 | Rémy Di Gregorio (FRA) | DNS-10 |
| 83 | Samuel Dumoulin (FRA) | 107 |
| 84 | Nicolas Edet (FRA) ‡ | 128 |
| 85 | Julien Fouchard (FRA) | 149 |
| 86 | Jan Ghyselinck (BEL) ‡ | 152 |
| 87 | Luis Ángel Maté (ESP) | 130 |
| 88 | David Moncoutié (FRA) | DNF-12 |
| 89 | Romain Zingle (BEL) ‡ | 90 |
Directeur sportif: Didier Rous

Saur–Sojasun (SAU)
| No. | Rider | Pos. |
|---|---|---|
| 91 | Jérôme Coppel (FRA) | 21 |
| 92 | Anthony Delaplace (FRA) ‡ | DNF-7 |
| 93 | Jimmy Engoulvent (FRA) | 153 |
| 94 | Brice Feillu (FRA) | 91 |
| 95 | Fabrice Jeandesboz (FRA) | 54 |
| 96 | Cyril Lemoine (FRA) | 136 |
| 97 | Guillaume Levarlet (FRA) | 75 |
| 98 | Jean-Marc Marino (FRA) | 131 |
| 99 | Julien Simon (FRA) | 92 |
Directeur sportif: Lylian Lebreton

Team Sky (SKY)
| No. | Rider | Pos. |
|---|---|---|
| 101 | Bradley Wiggins (GBR) | 1 |
| 102 | Edvald Boasson Hagen (NOR) ‡ | 56 |
| 103 | Mark Cavendish (GBR) | 142 |
| 104 | Bernhard Eisel (AUT) | 146 |
| 105 | Chris Froome (GBR) | 2 |
| 106 | Christian Knees (GER) | 82 |
| 107 | Richie Porte (AUS) | 34 |
| 108 | Michael Rogers (AUS) | 23 |
| 109 | Kanstantsin Sivtsov (BLR) | DNF-3 |
Directeur sportif: Sean Yates

Lotto–Belisol (LTB)
| No. | Rider | Pos. |
|---|---|---|
| 111 | Jurgen Van den Broeck (BEL) | 4 |
| 112 | Lars Bak (DEN) | 96 |
| 113 | Francis De Greef (BEL) | 102 |
| 114 | André Greipel (GER) | 123 |
| 115 | Adam Hansen (AUS) | 81 |
| 116 | Greg Henderson (NZL) | 124 |
| 117 | Jürgen Roelandts (BEL) | 104 |
| 118 | Marcel Sieberg (GER) | 132 |
| 119 | Jelle Vanendert (BEL) | 29 |
Directeur sportif: Herman Frison

Vacansoleil–DCM (VCD)
| No. | Rider | Pos. |
|---|---|---|
| 121 | Lieuwe Westra (NED) | DNF-11 |
| 122 | Kris Boeckmans (BEL) ‡ | 115 |
| 123 | Johnny Hoogerland (NED) | 67 |
| 124 | Gustav Larsson (SWE) | DNF-11 |
| 125 | Marco Marcato (ITA) | 57 |
| 126 | Wout Poels (NED) ‡ | DNF-6 |
| 127 | Rob Ruijgh (NED) | DNF-11 |
| 128 | Rafael Valls (ESP) ‡ | 41 |
| 129 | Kenny van Hummel (NED) | DNF-15 |
Directeur sportif: Hilaire Van der Schueren

Team Katusha (KAT)
| No. | Rider | Pos. |
|---|---|---|
| 131 | Denis Menchov (RUS) | DSQ |
| 132 | Giampaolo Caruso (ITA) | 37 |
| 133 | Óscar Freire (ESP) | DNS-7 |
| 134 | Vladimir Gusev (RUS) | DNF-16 |
| 135 | Joan Horrach (ESP) | 119 |
| 136 | Aleksandr Kuschynski (BLR) | 145 |
| 137 | Luca Paolini (ITA) | 108 |
| 138 | Yuri Trofimov (RUS) | 51 |
| 139 | Eduard Vorganov (RUS) | 19 |
Directeur sportif: Valerio Piva

FDJ–BigMat (FDJ)
| No. | Rider | Pos. |
|---|---|---|
| 141 | Sandy Casar (FRA) | 22 |
| 142 | Pierrick Fédrigo (FRA) | 48 |
| 143 | Yauheni Hutarovich (BLR) | DNF-15 |
| 144 | Mathieu Ladagnous (FRA) | 85 |
| 145 | Cédric Pineau (FRA) | 133 |
| 146 | Thibaut Pinot (FRA) ‡ | 10 |
| 147 | Anthony Roux (FRA) ‡ | 126 |
| 148 | Jérémy Roy (FRA) | 66 |
| 149 | Arthur Vichot (FRA) ‡ | 94 |
Directeur sportif: Thierry Bricaud

Rabobank (RAB)
| No. | Rider | Pos. |
|---|---|---|
| 151 | Robert Gesink (NED) | DNS-12 |
| 152 | Steven Kruijswijk (NED) ‡ | 33 |
| 153 | Bauke Mollema (NED) | DNF-11 |
| 154 | Mark Renshaw (AUS) | DNF-11 |
| 155 | Luis León Sánchez (ESP) | 64 |
| 156 | Bram Tankink (NED) | 144 |
| 157 | Laurens ten Dam (NED) | 28 |
| 158 | Maarten Tjallingii (NED) | DNS-4 |
| 159 | Maarten Wynants (BEL) | DNS-7 |
Directeur sportif: Frans Maassen

Movistar Team (MOV)
| No. | Rider | Pos. |
|---|---|---|
| 161 | Alejandro Valverde (ESP) | 20 |
| 162 | Juan José Cobo (ESP) | 30 |
| 163 | Rui Costa (POR) | 18 |
| 164 | Imanol Erviti (ESP) | DNS-7 |
| 165 | Iván Gutiérrez (ESP) | DNS-7 |
| 166 | Vladimir Karpets (RUS) | 53 |
| 167 | Vasil Kiryienka (BLR) | 77 |
| 168 | Rubén Plaza (ESP) | 101 |
| 169 | José Joaquín Rojas (ESP) | DNF-3 |
Directeur sportif: Yvon Ledanois

Saxo Bank–Tinkoff Bank (SAX)
| No. | Rider | Pos. |
|---|---|---|
| 171 | Jonathan Cantwell (AUS) | 137 |
| 172 | Juan José Haedo (ARG) | 140 |
| 173 | Karsten Kroon (NED) | 143 |
| 174 | Anders Lund (DEN) | 127 |
| 175 | Michael Mørkøv (DEN) | 93 |
| 176 | Nick Nuyens (BEL) | 121 |
| 177 | Sérgio Paulinho (POR) | 50 |
| 178 | Chris Anker Sørensen (DEN) | 14 |
| 179 | Nicki Sørensen (DEN) | 99 |
Directeur sportif: Dan Frost

Astana (AST)
| No. | Rider | Pos. |
|---|---|---|
| 181 | Janez Brajkovič (SLO) | 9 |
| 182 | Borut Božič (SLO) | 129 |
| 183 | Dmitry Fofonov (KAZ) | 63 |
| 184 | Andriy Hrivko (UKR) | 43 |
| 185 | Maxim Iglinsky (KAZ) | 116 |
| 186 | Andrey Kashechkin (KAZ) | 78 |
| 187 | Fredrik Kessiakoff (SWE) | 40 |
| 188 | Robert Kišerlovski (CRO) | DNF-14 |
| 189 | Alexander Vinokourov (KAZ) | 31 |
Directeur sportif: Giuseppe Martinelli

Omega Pharma–Quick-Step (OPQ)
| No. | Rider | Pos. |
|---|---|---|
| 191 | Levi Leipheimer (USA) | 32 |
| 192 | Sylvain Chavanel (FRA) | DNF-15 |
| 193 | Kevin De Weert (BEL) | 68 |
| 194 | Dries Devenyns (BEL) | 70 |
| 195 | Bert Grabsch (GER) | 125 |
| 196 | Tony Martin (GER) | DNS-10 |
| 197 | Jérôme Pineau (FRA) | 112 |
| 198 | Martin Velits (SVK) | 88 |
| 199 | Peter Velits (SVK) | 27 |
Directeur sportif: Brian Holm

Orica–GreenEDGE (OGE)
| No. | Rider | Pos. |
|---|---|---|
| 201 | Simon Gerrans (AUS) | 79 |
| 202 | Michael Albasini (SUI) | 110 |
| 203 | Baden Cooke (AUS) | 117 |
| 204 | Matthew Goss (AUS) | 120 |
| 205 | Daryl Impey (RSA) | 111 |
| 206 | Brett Lancaster (AUS) | DNF-15 |
| 207 | Sebastian Langeveld (NED) | 150 |
| 208 | Stuart O'Grady (AUS) | 97 |
| 209 | Pieter Weening (NED) | 72 |
Directeur sportif: Matt White

Argos–Shimano (ARG)
| No. | Rider | Pos. |
|---|---|---|
| 211 | Marcel Kittel (GER) ‡ | DNF-5 |
| 212 | Roy Curvers (NED) | 135 |
| 213 | Koen de Kort (NED) | 103 |
| 214 | Johannes Fröhlinger (GER) | DNS-8 |
| 215 | Patrick Gretsch (GER) ‡ | 141 |
| 216 | Yann Huguet (FRA) | 138 |
| 217 | Matthieu Sprick (FRA) | 113 |
| 218 | Albert Timmer (NED) | 148 |
| 219 | Tom Veelers (NED) | DNF-12 |
Directeur sportif: Christian Guiberteau

=== By nationality ===
| Country | No. of riders | Finishers | Stage wins |
|---|---|---|---|
| Argentina | 1 | 1 | |
| Australia | 12 | 9 | |
| Austria | 1 | 1 | |
| Belarus | 4 | 2 | |
| Belgium | 14 | 13 | |
| Canada | 1 | 0 | |
| Croatia | 1 | 0 | |
| Denmark | 5 | 5 | |
| Estonia | 1 | 1 | |
| France | 44 | 35 | 5 (Thomas Voeckler ×2, Thibaut Pinot, Pierre Rolland, Pierrick Fédrigo) |
| Germany | 13 | 10 | 3 (André Greipel ×3) |
| Ireland | 2 | 2 | |
| Italy | 15 | 13 | |
| Japan | 1 | 1 | |
| Kazakhstan | 4 | 4 | |
| Luxembourg | 1 | 0 | |
| Netherlands | 18 | 10 | |
| New Zealand | 1 | 1 | |
| Norway | 1 | 1 | |
| Poland | 1 | 1 | |
| Portugal | 2 | 2 | |
| Russia | 5 | 4 | |
| Slovakia | 3 | 3 | 3 (Peter Sagan ×3) |
| Slovenia | 4 | 3 | |
| South Africa | 2 | 1 | |
| Spain | 21 | 13 | 2 (Luis León Sánchez, Alejandro Valverde) |
| Sweden | 2 | 1 | |
| Switzerland | 3 | 2 | 1 (Fabian Cancellara) |
| Ukraine | 2 | 2 | |
| Great Britain | 5 | 5 | 7 (Mark Cavendish ×3, Bradley Wiggins ×2, Chris Froome, David Millar) |
| United States | 8 | 7 | |
| Total | 198 | 153 | 21 |

== Notes and references ==
=== Sources ===
- "Race regulations" (PDF). Tour de France. Amaury Sport Organisation. 2012. Archived from the original (PDF) on 14 July 2015.
