= 2008 Tour de Langkawi =

2007–08 UCI Asia Tour, race 9 of 26

Race details
- Dates: 9–17 February 2008
- Stages: 9
- Distance: 1,377.4 km (855.9 mi)
- Winning time: 31h 20' 28"

Results
Jersey awarded to the overall winner	Winner	Ruslan Ivanov (MDA)	(Diquigiovanni–Androni)
	Second	Matthieu Sprick (FRA)	(Bouygues Télécom)
	Third	Gustavo César (ESP)	(Karpin–Galicia)
Jersey awarded to the points classification winner	Points	Aurélien Clerc (SUI)	(Bouygues Télécom)
Jersey awarded to the mountains classification winner	Mountains	Filippo Savini (ITA)	(CSF Group–Navigare)
	Team	Diquigiovanni–Androni	

The 2008 Tour de Langkawi was the 13th edition of the Tour de Langkawi, a cycling stage race that took place in Malaysia. It started on 9 February in Alor Setar and ended on 17 February in Kuala Lumpur. This race was rated by the Union Cycliste Internationale (UCI) as a 2.HC race category and was highest ranked stage race on the 2007–08 UCI Asia Tour.

Moldova's Ruslan Ivanov emerged as the winner of the race, followed by Matthieu Sprick second and Gustavo César third. Aurélien Clerc won the points classification category and Filippo Savini won the mountains classification category. Diquigiovanni–Androni won the team classification category.

== Stages ==
The cyclists competed in 9 stages, covering a distance of 1,377.4 kilometres. The route for the Tour was unveiled on 17 December 2007 and revised on 31 December 2007. The traditional final race, criterium in Merdeka Square was also brought back to the race schedule. On January 23, 2008, it was announced that the route for Stage 8 Maran to Genting Highlands had been replaced with a route from Temerloh to Fraser's Hill due to the cyclist's safety reason. For the first time in the Tour's history, Genting Highlands route was not included in the race schedule.

Stage	Date	Course	Distance	Stage result		
Stage	Date	Course	Distance	Winner	Second	Third
1	9 February	Alor Setar to Kepala Batas	182.6 km (113.5 mi)	Matthieu Sprick (FRA)	Mitchell Docker (AUS)	Diego Nosotti (ITA)
2	10 February	Butterworth to Sitiawan	159.7 km (99.2 mi)	Jeremy Hunt (GBR)	Matteo Priamo (ITA)	Gustavo César (ESP)
3	11 February	Sitiawan to Banting	209.4 km (130.1 mi)	Lee Won-Jae (KOR)	Anuar Manan (MAS)	Xing Yandong (CHN)
4	12 February	Port Dickson to Batu Pahat	169 km (105.0 mi)	Danilo Hondo (GER)	Mauro Abel Richeze (ARG)	Marco Corsini (ITA)
5	13 February	Johor Bahru to Bandar Penawar	139.9 km (86.9 mi)	Alberto Loddo (ITA)	Mauro Abel Richeze (ARG)	Aurélien Clerc (SUI)
6	14 February	Bandar Penawar to Kuala Rompin	182.8 km (113.6 mi)	José Serpa (COL)	Alexandre Usov (BLR)	Johnnie Walker (AUS)
7	15 February	Kuala Rompin to Kuantan	126.6 km (78.7 mi)	Alexandre Usov (BLR)	Hassan Maleki (IRI)	Takashi Miyazawa (JPN)
8	16 February	Temerloh to Fraser's Hill	127 km (78.9 mi)	Filippo Savini (ITA)	Ruslan Ivanov (MDA)	José Serpa (COL)
9	17 February	Merdeka Square, Kuala Lumpur Criterium	80.4 km (50.0 mi)	Mauro Abel Richeze (ARG)	Jeremy Hunt (GBR)	Enrico Rossi (ITA)

== Classification leadership ==
Stage	Winner	General classification	Points classification	Mountains classification	Asian rider classification	Team classification	Asian team classification
1	Matthieu Sprick	Matthieu Sprick	Mitchell Docker	not available	Shinichi Fukushima	Diquigiovanni–Androni	Seoul Cycling Team
2	Jeremy Hunt	Matthieu Sprick	Gustavo César	not available	Shinichi Fukushima	Diquigiovanni–Androni	Meitan Hompo-GDR
3	Lee Won-Jae	Matthieu Sprick	Anuar Manan	not available	Shinichi Fukushima	Diquigiovanni–Androni	Meitan Hompo-GDR
4	Danilo Hondo	Matthieu Sprick	Anuar Manan	not available	Shinichi Fukushima	Diquigiovanni–Androni	Meitan Hompo-GDR
5	Alberto Loddo	Matthieu Sprick	Aurélien Clerc	not available	Shinichi Fukushima	Diquigiovanni–Androni	Meitan Hompo-GDR
6	José Serpa	Matthieu Sprick	Aurélien Clerc	Christoph Meschenmoser	Park Sung-Baek	Diquigiovanni–Androni	Seoul Cycling Team
7	Alexandre Usov	Mitchell Docker	Aurélien Clerc	Christoph Meschenmoser	Park Sung-Baek	Diquigiovanni–Androni	Seoul Cycling Team
8	Filippo Savini	Ruslan Ivanov	Aurélien Clerc	Filippo Savini	Shinichi Fukushima	Diquigiovanni–Androni	Seoul Cycling Team
9	Mauro Abel Richeze	Ruslan Ivanov	Aurélien Clerc	Filippo Savini	Shinichi Fukushima	Diquigiovanni–Androni	Seoul Cycling Team
Final		Ruslan Ivanov	Aurélien Clerc	Filippo Savini	Shinichi Fukushima	Diquigiovanni–Androni	Seoul Cycling Team

== Final standings ==
=== General classification ===
	Rider	Team	Time
1	Ruslan Ivanov (MDA)	Diquigiovanni–Androni	31h 20' 28"
2	Matthieu Sprick (FRA)	Bouygues Télécom	+ 29"
3	Gustavo César (ESP)	Karpin–Galicia	+ 32"
4	Jeremy Yates (NZL)	New Zealand	+ 36"
5	Yauhen Sobal (BLR)	Tinkoff Credit Systems	+ 48"
6	Mitchell Docker (AUS)	Drapac–Porsche Development Program	+ 56"
7	Jackson Rodríguez (VEN)	Diquigiovanni–Androni	+ 01' 03"
8	Jean-Marc Marino (FRA)	Crédit Agricole	+ 01' 09"
9	Ian McCleod (RSA)	South Africa	+ 01' 44"
10	Matt Wilson (AUS)	Team Type 1	+ 01' 48"

=== Points classification ===
	Rider	Team	Points
1	(Switzerland) Aurélien Clerc	Bouygues Télécom	92
2	(Malaysia) Anuar Manan	LeTua Cycling Team	60
3	(Belarus) Alexandre Usov	Ag2r–La Mondiale	49
4	(South Korea) Park Sung-Baek	Seoul Cycling Team	49
5	(Italy) Marco Corsini	NGC Medical–OTC Industria Porte	47
6	(Italy) Enrico Rossi	NGC Medical–OTC Industria Porte	43
7	(Japan) Takashi Miyazawa	Meitan Hompo-GDR	40
8	(United Kingdom) Jeremy Hunt	Crédit Agricole	38
9	(France) Sébastien Hinault	Crédit Agricole	35
10	(South Africa) Nolan Hoffman	South Africa	34

=== Mountains classification ===
	Rider	Team	Points
1	(Italy) Filippo Savini	CSF Group–Navigare	25
2	(Moldova) Ruslan Ivanov	Diquigiovanni–Androni	20
3	(Colombia) José Serpa	Diquigiovanni–Androni	16
4	(Venezuela) Carlos José Ochoa	Diquigiovanni–Androni	12
5	(Colombia) Walter Pedraza	Tinkoff Credit Systems	10
6	(New Zealand) Jeremy Yates	New Zealand	8
7	(Spain) Gustavo César	Karpin–Galicia	6
8	(France) Matthieu Sprick	Bouygues Télécom	5
9	(Germany) Christoph Meschenmoser	Team ISTA	4
10	(Iran) Mehdi Faridi	Islamic Azad University Cycling Team	4

=== Asian rider classification ===
	Rider	Team	Time
1	(Japan) Shinichi Fukushima	Meitan Hompo-GDR	31h 21' 18"
2	(Japan) Tomoya Kano	Skil–Shimano	+ 17"
3	(Japan) Hidenori Nodera	Skil–Shimano	+ 01' 30"
4	(South Korea) Park Sung-Baek	Seoul Cycling Team	+ 04' 30"
5	(South Korea) Kim Gu-Hyeon	Seoul Cycling Team	+ 20' 00"
6	(Iran) Mehdi Faridi	Islamic Azad University Cycling Team	+ 22' 00"
7	(Indonesia) Tonton Susanto	LeTua Cycling Team	+ 22' 04"
8	(South Korea) Gong Hyo-Suk	Seoul Cycling Team	+ 22' 58"
9	(Malaysia) Ng Yong Li	Meitan Hompo-GDR	+ 23' 02"
10	(Iran) Amir Zargari	Islamic Azad University Cycling Team	+ 23' 16"

=== Team classification ===
	Team	Time
1	Diquigiovanni–Androni	94h 20' 36"
2	Team Type 1	+ 10' 27"
3	Skil–Shimano	+ 12' 22"
4	Bouygues Télécom	+ 21' 42"
5	South Africa	+ 22' 24"
6	Tinkoff Credit Systems	+ 25' 26"
7	SouthAustralia.com–AIS	+ 28' 08"
8	Seoul Cycling Team	+ 28' 29"
9	Crédit Agricole	+ 28' 39"
10	Meitan Hompo-GDR	+ 31' 23"

=== Asian team classification ===
	Team	Time
1	Seoul Cycling Team	94h 49' 05"
2	Meitan Hompo-GDR	+ 02' 54"
3	Islamic Azad University Cycling Team	+ 26' 06"
4	Malaysia	+ 32' 05"
5	Polygon Sweet Nice	+ 32' 51"

== List of teams and riders ==
A total of 25 teams were invited to participate in the 2008 Tour de Langkawi. Out of the 148 riders, a total of 131 riders made it to the finish in Kuala Lumpur.

Crédit Agricole

- (Australia) Simon Gerrans
- (France) Sébastien Hinault
- (United Kingdom) Jeremy Hunt
- (France) Jean-Marc Marino
- (France) Maxime Méderel
- (Republic of Ireland) Nicolas Roche

Diquigiovanni–Androni

- (Colombia) José Serpa
- (Germany) Danilo Hondo
- (Moldova) Ruslan Ivanov
- (Venezuela) Carlos José Ochoa
- (Venezuela) Jackson Rodríguez
- (Italy) Denis Bertolini

South Africa

- (South Africa) Ian McCleod
- (South Africa) David George
- (South Africa) Waylon Woolcock
- (South Africa) Jacobus Venter
- (South Africa) Nolan Hoffman
- (South Africa) Dennis van Niekerk

Giant Asia Racing Team

- (Germany) Stefan Loefler
- (United Kingdom) Alex Coutts
- (Germany) Erik Hoffmann
- (Chinese Taipei) Lai Kuan-Hua
- (Chinese Taipei) Peng Kuei-Hsiang

Tinkoff Credit Systems

- (Russia) Pavel Brutt
- (Russia) Serguei Klimov
- (Italy) Alberto Loddo
- (Colombia) Walter Pedraza
- (Belarus) Yauhen Sobal
- (Russia) Nikolai Trusov

Skil–Shimano

- (Japan) Hidenori Nodera
- (Japan) Tomoya Kano
- (Japan) Yoshimasa Hirose
- (Japan) Yusuke Hatanaka
- (Japan) Yoshiyuki Abe
- (Japan) Yoshinori Iino

Bouygues Télécom

- (France) Mathieu Claude
- (Netherlands) Stef Clement
- (Switzerland) Aurélien Clerc
- (France) Rony Martias
- (France) Matthieu Sprick
- (Switzerland) Johann Tschopp

Ag2r–La Mondiale

- (Belarus) Alexandre Usov
- (Estonia) Tanel Kangert
- (France) Cédric Pineau
- (France) Jean-Charles Sénac
- (France) Blaise Sonnery
- (Belgium) Stijn Vandenberg

CSF Group–Navigare

- (Argentina) Guillermo Bongiorno
- (Mexico) Julio Alberto Pérez
- (Argentina) Mauro Abel Richeze
- (Italy) Filippo Savini
- (Italy) Francesco Tomei
- (Italy) Matteo Priamo

Karpin–Galicia

- (Spain) David García Dapena
- (Spain) Gustavo César
- (Spain) Ramon Troncoso
- (Spain) Juan Mouron
- (Spain) Alejandro Paleo
- (Russia) Vladimir Isaichev

Team Type 1

- (Australia) Matthew Wilson
- (Australia) Benjamin Brooks
- (Australia) Fabio Cazabria
- (New Zealand) Glen Chadwick
- (Mexico) Moisés Aldape
- (United States) Ian MacGregor

NGC Medical–OTC Industria Porte

- (Italy) Enrico Rossi
- (Italy) Marco Corsini
- (Italy) Massimiliano Maisto
- (Switzerland) Stefan Trafelet
- (Italy) Diego Nosotti

Team ISTA

- (Germany) Rolf Hofbauer
- (Germany) Nico Keinath
- (Germany) Joerg Lehmann
- (Germany) Christoph Meschenmoser
- (Germany) Robin Schmuda
- (Germany) Nikolai Schwarz

SouthAustralia.com–AIS

- (Australia) Simon Clarke
- (Australia) Zakkari Dempster
- (Australia) William Ford
- (Australia) Benjamin King
- (Australia) Wesley Sulzberger
- (Australia) Johnnie Walker

Meitan Hompo-GDR

- (Japan) Yukiya Arashiro
- (Japan) Koji Fukushima
- (Japan) Shinichi Fukushima
- (Japan) Takashi Miyazawa
- (Japan) Miyataka Shimizu
- (Malaysia) Ng Yong Li

Trek–Marco Polo

- (Australia) Jai Crawford
- (Russia) Serguei Kudentsov
- (China) Li Fuyu
- (China) Xing Yandong
- (Malaysia) Loh Sea Keong
- (Japan) Ken Onodera

Islamic Azad University Cycling Team

- (Iran) Abbas Saeidi Tanha
- (Iran) Amir Zargari
- (Iran) Hassan Maleki
- (Iran) Mehdi Faridi
- (Iran) Mehdi Sohrabi
- (Iran) Farshad Salehian

LeTua Cycling Team

- (Malaysia) Anuar Manan
- (Malaysia) Ahmad Haidar Anuawar
- (Australia) Bernard Sulzberger
- (Malaysia) Mohd Sayuti Mohd Zahit
- (Indonesia) Tonton Susanto
- (Indonesia) Ariehan Ryan

Polygon Sweet Nice

- (Indonesia) Hari Fitrianto
- (Indonesia) Rizza Abdullah Pahlavi
- (Kazakhstan) Vyacheslav Dyadichkin
- (Indonesia) Herwin Jaya
- (Colombia) Vladimir Lopez
- (Indonesia) Budi Santoso

Seoul Cycling Team

- (South Korea) Park Sung-Baek
- (South Korea) Park Seon-Ho
- (South Korea) Gong Hyo-Suk
- (South Korea) Lee Won-Jae
- (South Korea) Yoo Ki-Hong
- (South Korea) Kim Gu-Hyeon

MNCF Cycling Team

- (Malaysia) Amir Mustafa Rusli
- (Malaysia) Mohd Jasmin Ruslan
- (Malaysia) Mohd Saiful Anuar Abd Aziz
- (Malaysia) Mohamed Harrif Salleh
- (Malaysia) Thum Weng Kin
- (Malaysia) Harnizam Basri

Drapac–Porsche Development Program

- (Australia) Stuart Shaw
- (Australia) Peter McDonald
- (Australia) Mitchell Docker
- (Australia) Robert Williams
- (Australia) Gene Bates
- (Australia) Mark O'Brien

New Zealand

- (New Zealand) Jeremy Yates
- (New Zealand) Justin Kerr
- (New Zealand) Ashley Whitehead
- (New Zealand) Paul Odlin
- (New Zealand) Scott Lyttle
- (New Zealand) Joseph Chapman

Hong Kong

- (Hong Kong) Chan Chun Hing
- (Hong Kong) Wu Kin San
- (Hong Kong) Lam Kai Tsun
- (Hong Kong) Tang Wang Yip
- (Hong Kong) Ko Siu Wai
- (Hong Kong) Yeung Ying Hon

Malaysia

- (Malaysia) Suhardi Hassan
- (Malaysia) Muhammad Fauzan Ahmad Lutfi
- (Malaysia) Mohamed Zamri Salleh
- (Malaysia) Mohd Rauf Nur Misbah
- (Malaysia) Mohd Faris Abd Razak
- (Malaysia) Muhamad Firdaus Daud
