= Mitchell Docker =

Australian cyclist (born 1986)

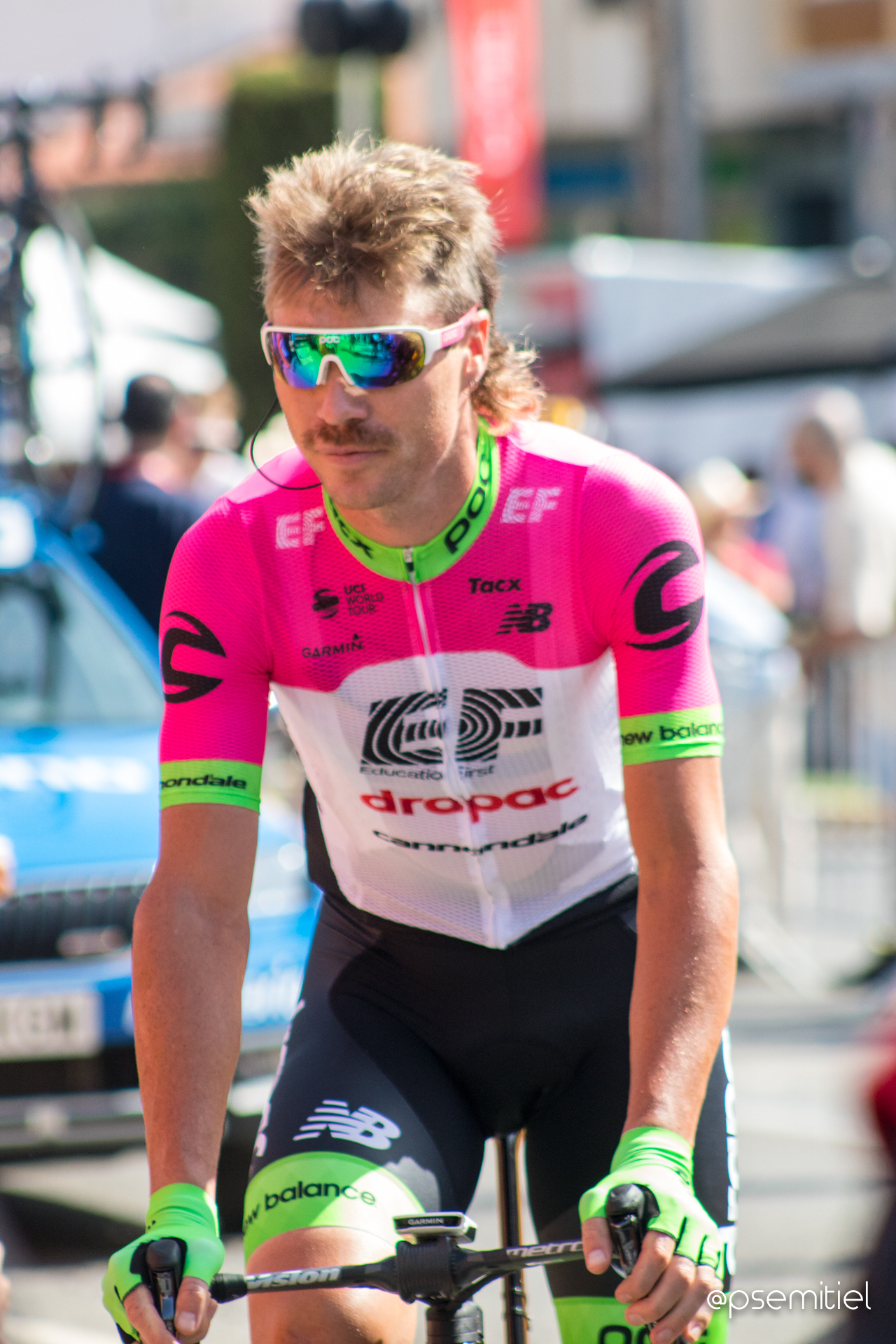
- Docker at the 2018 Vuelta a España

Personal information
- Full name: Mitchell Docker
- Nickname: Mitch
- Born: 2 October 1986 (age 40) Melbourne, Victoria, Australia
- Height: 1.80 m (5 ft 11 in)
- Weight: 73 kg (161 lb)

Cycling career
- Sport: Cycling
- Current team: Retired
- Discipline: Road
- Role: Rider
- Rider type: Classics rider; Lead-out man

Professional teams
- 2006–2008: Drapac–Porsche
- 2009–2011: Skil–Shimano
- 2012–2017: GreenEDGE
- 2018–2021: EF Education First–Drapac p/b Cannondale

Major wins
- Grand Tours Giro d'Italia 1 TTT stage (2014)

Mitchell Docker (born 2 October 1986) is an Australian former road racing cyclist, who competed as a professional from 2006 to 2021.

In May 2021, Docker announced that he would retire from professional cycling at the end of the 2021 season.

== Career ==
He was born in Melbourne, Victoria, Australia. He joined Australian Junior Road Team in 2003 and joined Drapac Porsche in 2006. He joined the GreenEDGE team for the 2012 season, and remained with the team up until the end of the 2017 season. For 2018, Docker joined EF Education First–Drapac p/b Cannondale.

He has a podcast called Life in the Peloton, in which he talks about being a professional cyclist.

== Major results ==
2005
8th Overall Herald Sun Tour
2007
1st Stage 3 Tour de Hokkaido
2008
1st Stage 5 Tour de East Java
2nd Drie Zustersteden
6th Overall Tour de Langkawi
2009
2nd Halle–Ingooigem
5th Rund um die Nürnberger Altstadt
2010
47th Paris Roubaix
1st Stage 3 Route du Sud
4th Overall Delta Tour Zeeland

1st Stage 1

5th Overall Driedaagse van West-Vlaanderen
2011
6th Gent–Wevelgem
2013
1st Bay Classic Series, Williamstown
2014
1st Stage 1 (TTT) Giro d'Italia
2015
9th Overall Bay Classic Series
2016
4th Arnhem–Veenendaal Classic
2017
4th Hong Kong Challenge
9th Dwars door Vlaanderen

=== Grand Tour general classification results timeline ===
Grand Tour	2012	2013	2014	2015	2016	2017	2018	2019	2020
Giro d'Italia	—	—	DNF	—	—	—	131	—	—
Tour de France	Has not contested during his career								
Vuelta a España	166	135	147	DNF	—	—	151	122	132

Legend
—	Did not compete
DNF	Did not finish
