= Jean-Marc Marino =

Road bicycle racer

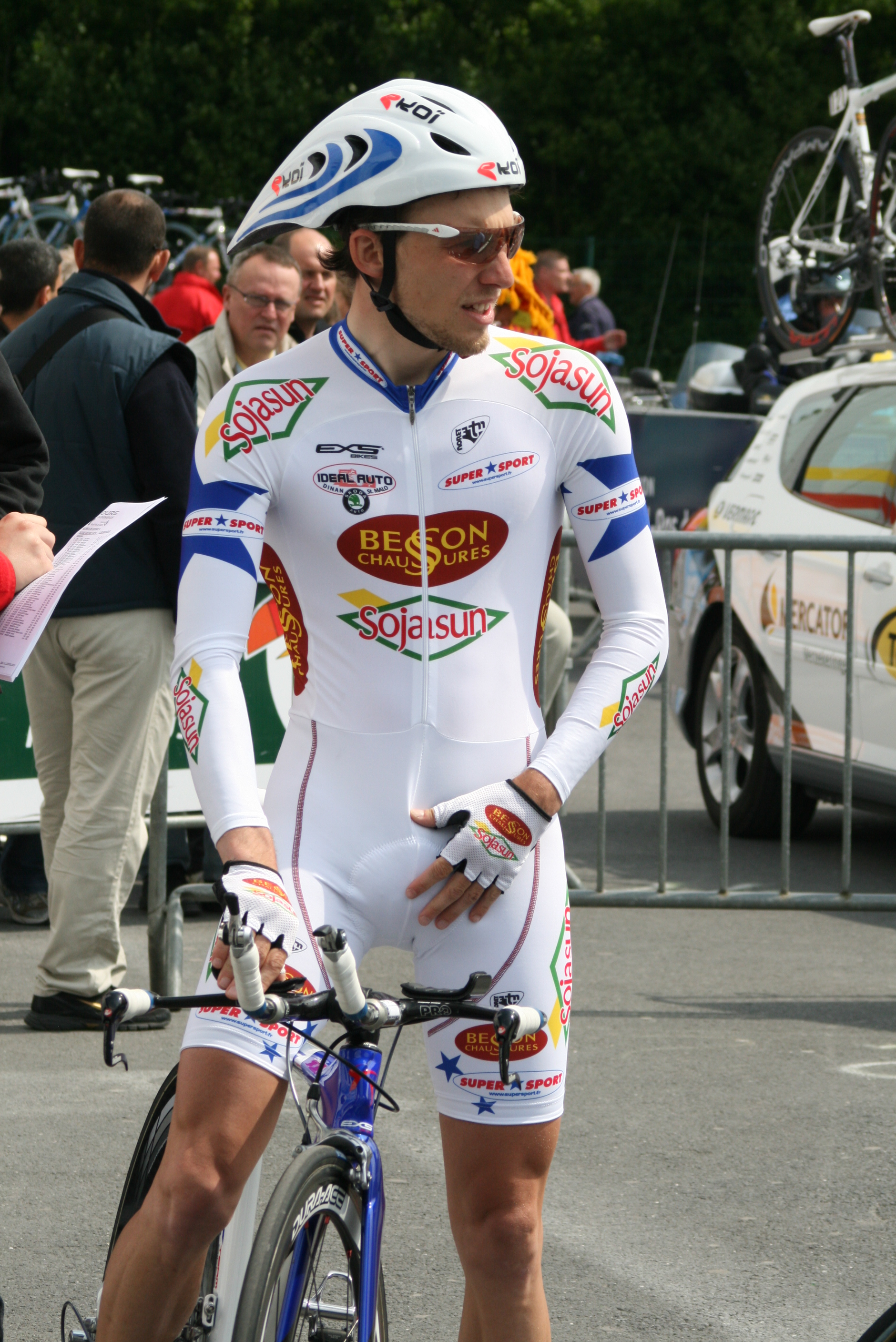
- Marino at the 2009 Four Days of Dunkirk

Personal information
- Full name: Jean-Marc Marino
- Born: 15 August 1983 (age 43) Castres, France
- Height: 1.77 m (5 ft 10 in)
- Weight: 66 kg (146 lb)

Cycling career
- Sport: Cycling
- Current team: Retired
- Discipline: Road
- Role: Rider

Amateur teams
- 2004: UC Châteauroux
- 2005: Crédit Agricole (stagiaire)

Professional teams
- 2006–2008: Crédit Agricole
- 2009–2013: Besson Chaussures–Sojasun
- 2014: Cannondale

Jean-Marc Marino (born 15 August 1983) is a French former professional road bicycle racer, who rode professionally between 2006 and 2014 for the Crédit Agricole, Sojasun and Cannondale teams.

== Major results ==
2004
5th La Roue Tourangelle
6th Overall Ronde de l'Isard
7th Paris–Mantes-en-Yvelines
2005
1st La Côte Picarde
6th Overall Ronde de l'Isard
2006
6th Overall Tour du Poitou-Charentes
2007
2nd Flèche Ardennaise
5th Overall La Tropicale Amissa Bongo
5th Grand Prix de Plumelec-Morbihan
2008
8th Overall Tour de Langkawi
2010
8th Overall Tour Méditerranéen
2011
7th Route Adélie
7th Paris–Troyes
9th Overall Route du Sud
9th Tour du Finistère
2012
8th Paris–Camembert
