= Matthieu Sprick =

French cyclist

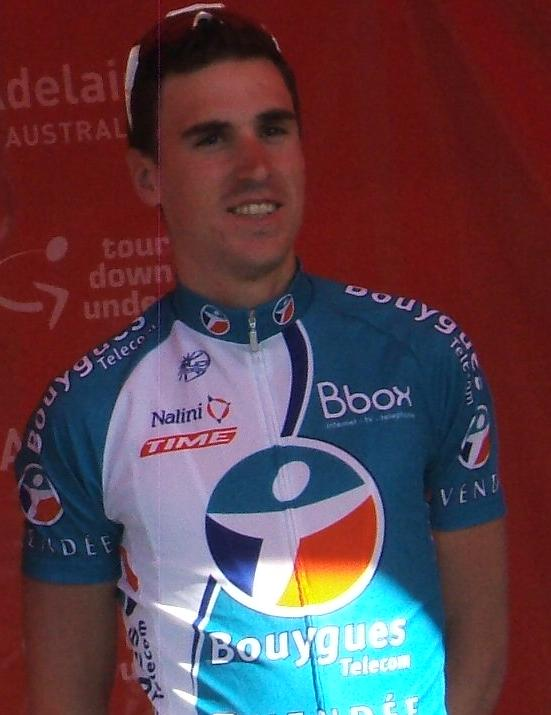
- Sprick at the 2009 Tour Down Under.

Personal information
- Full name: Matthieu Sprick
- Born: 29 September 1981 (age 45) Sarreguemines, France
- Height: 1.81 m (5 ft 11 in)
- Weight: 71 kg (157 lb)

Cycling career
- Sport: Cycling
- Discipline: Road
- Role: Rider

Professional teams
- 2004–2010: Brioches La Boulangère
- 2011–2014: Skil–Shimano

Matthieu Sprick (born 29 September 1981 in Sarreguemines, Moselle) is a French former professional cyclist who last rode for UCI ProTeam Giant–Shimano.

== Major results ==
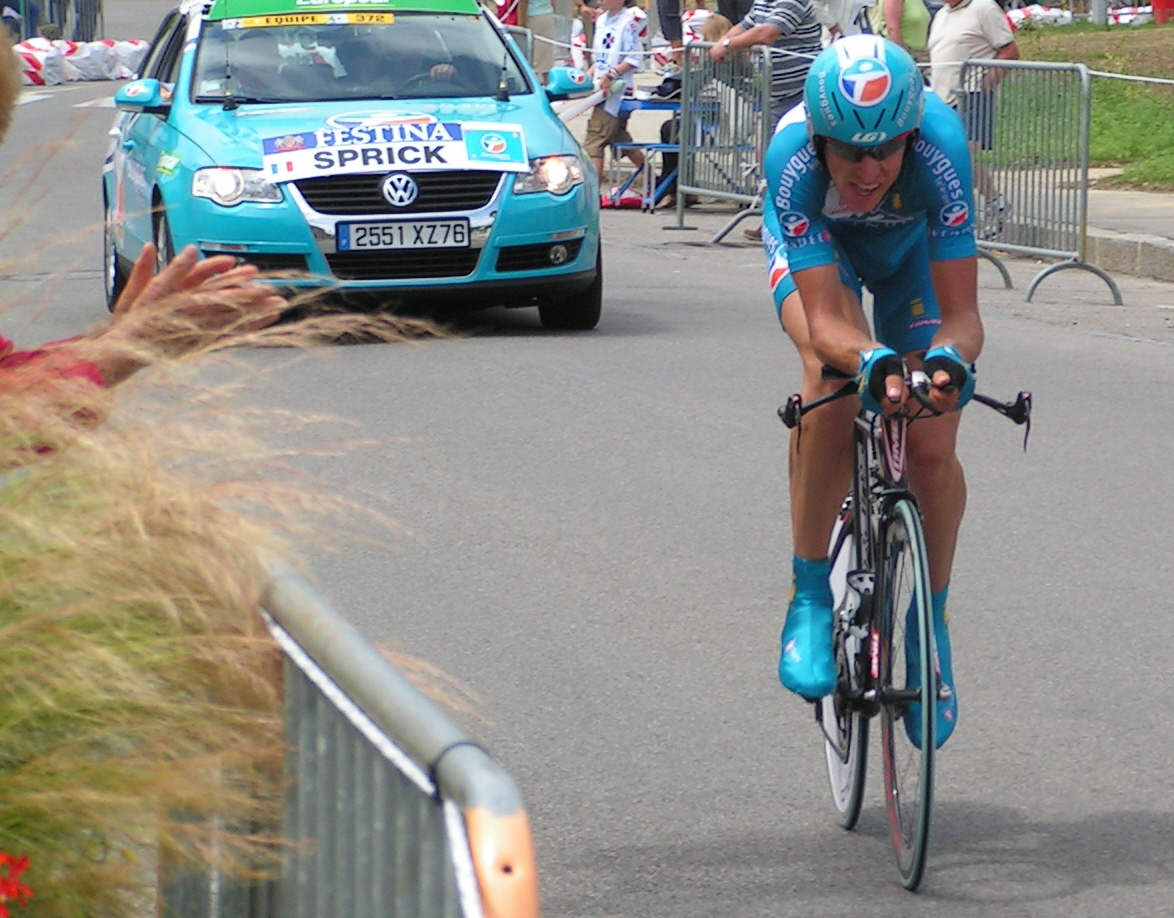
Sprick at the 2006 Tour de France.

2003
1st, Tour du Doubs
2007
1st, Stage 4 Combativity award, Tour de France
2008
1st, Stage 1, Tour de Langkawi
