= Filippo Savini =

Italian cyclist

Personal information
- Full name: Filippo Savini
- Born: 2 May 1985 (age 41) Faenza, Italy

Cycling career
- Sport: Cycling
- Current team: Nankang–Dynatek
- Discipline: Road
- Role: Rider

Professional teams
- 2007–2012: Ceramica Panaria–Navigare
- 2013–: Ceramica Flaminia–Fondriest

Filippo Savini (born 2 May 1985 in Faenza) is an Italian professional road bicycle racer for UCI Continental team Nankang–Dynatek.

== Palmarès ==
2005
1st, Stage 5, Giro delle Valli Cuneesi nelle Alpi del Mare
2006
1st, Memorial Danilo Furlan
1st, Circuito Internazionale di Caneva
2008
1st, Stage 8, Tour de Langkawi
1st, Stage 4, Presidential Cycling Tour of Turkey
2011
1st, Stage 3, Vuelta a Castilla y León
