= Christoph Meschenmoser =

German cyclist

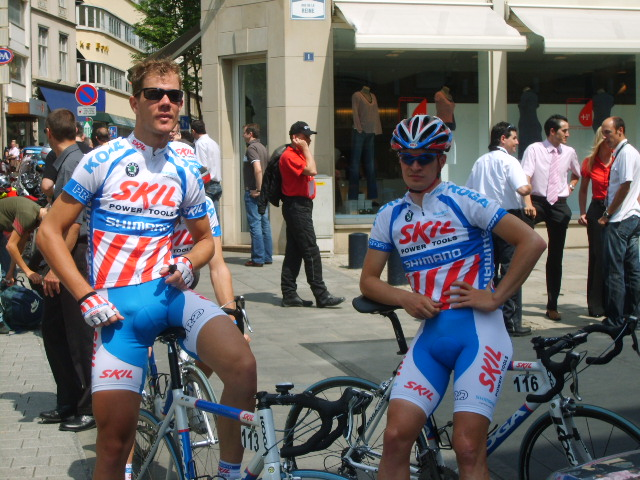
- Meschenmoser (right) in 2007

Personal information
- Full name: Christoph Meschenmoser
- Born: 29 July 1983 (age 43) Duisburg, West Germany

Cycling career
- Sport: Cycling
- Discipline: Road
- Role: Rider

Professional teams
- 2006–2007: Skil–Shimano
- 2008: Team Ista

Christoph Meschenmoser (born 29 July 1983 in Duisburg) is a German cyclist.

== Palmares ==
2001
1st Junior World Pursuit Champion
1st Junior National Time Trial Championships
2002
2nd European U23 Madison Championships
2005
2nd Neuseen Classics
3rd Overall Mainfranken-Tour
2008
3rd Overall Tour de Korea
