= 2006–07 UCI Asia Tour =

- Third edition of the UCI Asia Tour

Details
- Dates: 22 October 2006 – 17 September 2007
- Location: Asia
- Races: 24

Champions
- Individual champion: Hossein Askari (IRI) (Giant Asia Racing Team)
- Teams' champion: Giant Asia Racing Team
- Nations' champion: Iran

The 2006–07 UCI Asia Tour was the third season of the UCI Asia Tour. The season began on 22 October 2006 with the Japan Cup and ended on 17 September 2007 with the Tour de Hokkaido.

The points leader, based on the cumulative results of previous races, wears the UCI Asia Tour cycling jersey. Ghader Mizbani from Iran was the defending champion of the 2005–06 UCI Asia Tour. Hossein Askari of Iran was crowned as the 2006–07 UCI Asia Tour champion.

Throughout the season, points are awarded to the top finishers of stages within stage races and the final general classification standings of each of the stages races and one-day events. The quality and complexity of a race also determines how many points are awarded to the top finishers, the higher the UCI rating of a race, the more points are awarded.

The UCI ratings from highest to lowest are as follows:

- Multi-day events: 2.HC, 2.1 and 2.2
- One-day events: 1.HC, 1.1 and 1.2

== Events ==
=== 2006 ===
Date	Race Name	Location	UCI Rating	Winner	Team
22 October	Japan Cup	Japan	1.1	Riccardo Riccò (ITA)	Saunier Duval–Prodir
12 November	Tour de Okinawa	Japan	1.2	Takashi Miyazawa (JPN)	Cycle Racing Team Vang
12–17 November	Tour of Hainan	China	2.2	Sergey Kolesnikov (RUS)	Omnibike Dynamo Moscow
25–30 December	Tour of South China Sea	China; Hong Kong; Macau	2.2	Alexander Khatuntsev (RUS)	Omnibike Dynamo Moscow

=== 2007 ===
Date	Race Name	Location	UCI Rating	Winner	Team
6–12 January	Jelajah Malaysia	Malaysia	2.2	Mehdi Sohrabi (IRI)	Iran (national team)
20–25 January	Tour of Siam	Thailand	2.2	Jai Crawford (AUS)	Giant Asia Racing Team
28 January – 2 February	Tour of Qatar	Qatar	2.1	Wilfried Cretskens (BEL)	Quick-Step–Innergetic
2–11 February	Tour de Langkawi	Malaysia	2.HC	Anthony Charteau (FRA)	Crédit Agricole
3–7 March	Taftan Tour	Iran	2.2	Hossein Nateghi (IRI)	MES Kerman
18–24 March	Tour de Taiwan	Taiwan	2.2	Shawn Milne (USA)	Health Net–Maxxis
21–27 April	Kerman Tour	Iran	2.2	Pavel Nevdakh (KAZ)	Brisasport Turkiye
20–27 May	Tour of Japan	Japan	2.2	Francesco Masciarelli (ITA)	Acqua & Sapone–Caffè Mokambo
22–29 May	Azerbaïjan Tour	Iran	2.2	Hossein Askari (IRI)	Giant Asia Racing Team
4–8 July	Tour de East Java	Indonesia	2.2	Björn Glasner (GER)	Regiostrom–Senges
14–22 July	Tour of Qinghai Lake	China	2.HC	Gabriele Missaglia (ITA)	Diquigiovanni–Selle Italia
29 July – 3 August	Tour of Hong Kong Shanghai	Hong Kong; China	2.2	James Meadley (AUS)	Jelly Belly Cycling Team
4–5 August	Melaka Chief Minister Cup	Malaysia	2.2	Mohamed Rauf Nur Misbah (MAS)	Malaysia (national team)
8–14 August	Tour of Milad du Nour	Iran	2.2	Ghader Mizbani (IRI)	Giant Asia Racing Team
18 August	Test Event Road Cycling Beijing 2008 – Road race	China	2.2	Gabriele Bosisio (ITA)	Italy (national team)
19 August	Test Event Road Cycling Beijing 2008 – Time trial	China	2.2	Cadel Evans (AUS)	Australia (national team)
1–9 September	Tour de Korea	South Korea	2.2	Park Sung-Baek (KOR)	South Korea (national team)
8 September	Asian Cycling Championships – Road race	Thailand	CC	Takashi Miyazawa (JPN)	Japan (national team)
10 September	Asian Cycling Championships – Time trial	Thailand	CC	Eugen Wacker (KGZ)	Kyrgyzstan (national team)
13–17 September	Tour de Hokkaido	Japan	2.2	Henri Werner (GER)	Isaac

== Final standings ==
=== Individual classification ===
Rank	Name	Team	Points
1.	Hossein Askari (IRI)	Giant Asia Racing Team	313
2.	Ghader Mizbani (IRI)	Giant Asia Racing Team	300
3.	Takashi Miyazawa (JPN)	Nippo Corporation-Meitan Honpo co. Ltd-Asada	233
4.	Park Sung-Baek (KOR)	South Korea (national team)	202
5.	Mehdi Sohrabi (IRI)	Iran (national team)	163
6.	Gabrielle Missaglia (ITA)	Diquigiovanni–Selle Italia	152
7.	Yukiya Arashiro (JPN)	Nippo Corporation-Meitan Honpo co. Ltd-Asada	146
8.	Ahad Kazemi (IRI)	Giant Asia Racing Team	144
9.	Jai Crawford (AUS)	Giant Asia Racing Team	129
10.	Alberto Loddo (ITA)	Diquigiovanni–Selle Italia	126

=== Team classification ===
Rank	Team	Points
1.	Giant Asia Racing Team	908
2.	Nippo Corporation-Meitan Honpo co. Ltd-Asada	585
3.	Diquigiovanni–Selle Italia	463
4.	Hong Kong Pro Cycling	419
5.	Islamic Azad University Cycling Team	326
6.	Skil–Shimano	237
7.	Aisan Racing Team	183
8.	Discovery Channel–Marco Polo	151
9.	Relax–GAM	124
10.	Drapac–Porsche Development Program	119

=== Nation classification ===
Rank	Nation	Points
1.	Iran	1337
2.	Japan	1103
3.	Kazakhstan	448
4.	Hong Kong	445
5.	Uzbekistan	428
6.	South Korea	373
7.	Malaysia	204
8.	Kyrgyzstan	202
9.	United Arab Emirates	125
10.	Mongolia	115

=== Nation under-23 classification ===
Rank	Nation under-23	Points
1.	South Korea	336
2.	Iran	238
3.	Malaysia	184
4.	Japan	144
5.	Hong Kong	122
6.	Kazakhstan	114
7.	Uzbekistan	83
8.	Mongolia	59
9.	Indonesia	46
9.	Syria	46
