= 2005–06 UCI Asia Tour =

- Second edition of the UCI Asia Tour

Details
- Dates: 28 September 2005 – 16 September 2006
- Location: Asia
- Races: 26

Champions
- Individual champion: Ghader Mizbani (IRI) (Giant Asia Racing Team)
- Teams' champion: Giant Asia Racing Team
- Nations' champion: Iran

The 2005–06 UCI Asia Tour was the second season of the UCI Asia Tour. The season began on 28 September 2005 with the Tour of Milad du Nour and ended on 16 September 2006 with the 2006 Asian Cycling Championships.

The points leader, based on the cumulative results of previous races, wears the UCI Asia Tour cycling jersey. Andrey Mizurov from Kazakhstan was the defending champion of the 2005 UCI Asia Tour. Ghader Mizbani of Iran was crowned as the 2005–06 UCI Asia Tour champion.

Throughout the season, points are awarded to the top finishers of stages within stage races and the final general classification standings of each of the stages races and one-day events. The quality and complexity of a race also determines how many points are awarded to the top finishers, the higher the UCI rating of a race, the more points are awarded.

The UCI ratings from highest to lowest are as follows:

- Multi-day events: 2.HC, 2.1 and 2.2
- One-day events: 1.HC, 1.1 and 1.2

== Events ==
=== 2005 ===
Date	Race Name	Location	UCI Rating	Winner	Team
28 September – 4 October	Tour of Milad du Nour	Iran	2.2	David McCann (IRL)	Giant Asia Racing Team
23 October	Japan Cup	Japan	1.1	Damiano Cunego (ITA)	Lampre–Caffita
29 October – 3 November	Tour de Taiwan	Taiwan	2.2	Ahad Kazemi (IRI)	Giant Asia Racing Team
13 November	Tour de Okinawa	Japan	1.2	Yasutaka Tashiro (JPN)	Bridgestone Anchor
11 December	Asian Cycling Championships – Time trial	India	2.2	Youm Jung-Hwan (KOR)	South Korea (national team)
13 December	Asian Cycling Championships – Road race	India	2.2	Joo Hyun-Wook (KOR)	South Korea (national team)
25–31 December	Tour of South China Sea	China; Hong Kong; Macau	2.2	Wu Kin San (HKG)	Purapharm

=== 2006 ===
Date	Race Name	Location	UCI Rating	Winner	Team
15–21 January	Tour of Siam	Thailand	2.2	Thomas Rabou (NED)	Marco Polo
24–29 January	Tour of Thailand	Thailand	2.2	Li Fuyu (CHN)	Marco Polo
27 January	International Grand Prix Doha	Qatar	1.1	Tom Boonen (BEL)	Quick-Step–Innergetic
30 January – 3 February	Tour of Qatar	Qatar	2.1	Tom Boonen (BEL)	Quick-Step–Innergetic
3–12 February	Tour de Langkawi	Malaysia	2.HC	David George (RSA)	South Africa (national team)
5–11 March	Tour de Taiwan	Taiwan	2.2	Kirk O'Bee (USA)	Health Net–Maxxis
15–19 April	Tour of Chongming Island	China	2.2	Robert McLachlan (AUS)	Drapac–Porsche
15–20 April	Kerman Tour	Iran	2.2	Ghader Mizbani (IRI)	Giant Asia Racing Team
3–7 May	Tour of Hong Kong Shanghai	Hong Kong; China	2.2	Geert Steurs (BEL)	Pictoflex-Bikeland-Hyundai
4–10 May	Tour de Korea	South Korea	2.2	Tobias Erler (GER)	Giant Asia Racing Team
14–21 May	Tour of Japan	Japan	2.2	Vladimir Luma (UKR)	Universal Caffè
22–29 May	Azerbaïjan Tour	Iran	2.2	Ghader Mizbani (IRI)	Giant Asia Racing Team
5–9 July	Tour de East Java	Indonesia	2.2	Ghader Mizbani (IRI)	Giant Asia Racing Team
15–23 July	Tour of Qinghai Lake	China	2.HC	Maarten Tjallingii (NED)	Skil–Shimano
14–20 August	Tour of Milad du Nour	Iran	2.2	Ghader Mizbani (IRI)	Giant Asia Racing Team
27 August – 4 September	Tour d'Indonesia	Indonesia	2.2	David McCann (IRL)	Giant Asia Racing Team
13–18 September	Tour de Hokkaido	Japan	2.2	Taiji Nishitani (JPN)	Aisan Racing Team
14 September	Asian Cycling Championships – Time trial	Malaysia	CC	Andrey Mizurov (KAZ)	Kazakhstan (national team)
16 September	Asian Cycling Championships – Road race	Malaysia	CC	Mehdi Sohrabi (IRI)	Iran (national team)

== Final standings ==
=== Individual classification ===
Rank	Name	Team	Points
1.	Ghader Mizbani (IRI)	Giant Asia Racing Team	434.32
2.	Hossein Askari (IRI)	Giant Asia Racing Team	386.32
3.	Ahad Kazemi (IRI)	Giant Asia Racing Team	259.32
4.	David McCann (IRL)	Giant Asia Racing Team	228
5.	Maarten Tjallingii (NED)	Skil–Shimano	189
6.	Omar Hasanein (SYR)	Syria (national team)	188.66
7.	David George (RSA)	Relax–GAM	178
8.	Tobias Erler (GER)	Giant Asia Racing Team	167
9.	Mehdi Sohrabi (IRI)	Iran (national team)	167
10.	Robert McLachlan (AUS)	Drapac–Porsche	162

=== Team classification ===
Rank	Team	Points
1.	Giant Asia Racing Team	1379.64
2.	Skil–Shimano	397
3.	Relax–GAM	375
4.	Marco Polo	371
5.	Cycle Racing Team Vang	308
6.	Cycling Team Capec	222
7.	Drapac–Porsche	210
8.	Purapharm	179
9.	Selle Italia–Diquigiovanni	152
10.	Aisan Racing Team	149

=== Nation classification ===
Rank	Nation	Points
1.	Iran	1730.06
2.	Japan	849
3.	Kazakhstan	770
4.	Uzbekistan	433
5.	Hong Kong	288
6.	South Korea	261
7.	Mongolia	243
8.	Syria	198.64
9.	China	123
10.	United Arab Emirates	106
