= Amir Zargari =

Iranian cyclist (born 1980)

Personal information
- Full name: Amir Zargari
- Born: July 31, 1980 (age 46) Khomeyn, Iran
- Height: 1.76 m (5 ft 9 in)
- Weight: 62 kg (137 lb)

Cycling career
- Sport: Cycling
- Current team: Retired
- Disciplines: Road; Track
- Role: Rider

Professional teams
- 2005: Paykan Tehran
- 2007–2011: Islamic Azad University Cycling Team
- 2012: Ag2r–La Mondiale
- 2013: Azad University Giant Team
- 2013: RTS Racing Team
- 2014–2016: Pishgaman Yazd
Medal record
Representing Iran
Men's road cycling
Asian Championships
Silver medal – second place	2006 Kuala Lumpur	Team time trial
Men's track cycling
Asian Games
Silver medal – second place	2002 Busan	Team pursuit
Silver medal – second place	2006 Doha	Team pursuit
Bronze medal – third place	1998 Bangkok	Points race
Bronze medal – third place	2006 Doha	Madison
Asian Championships
Gold medal – first place	2000 Shanghai	Team pursuit
Gold medal – first place	2002 Bangkok	Elimination
Silver medal – second place	2001 Kaohsiung	Madison
Silver medal – second place	2002 Bangkok	Team pursuit
Silver medal – second place	2003 Changwon	Elimination
Silver medal – second place	2003 Changwon	Team pursuit
Silver medal – second place	2004 Yokkaichi	Team pursuit
Silver medal – second place	2005 Ludhiana	Team pursuit
Silver medal – second place	2006 Kuala Lumpur	Team pursuit
Silver medal – second place	2007 Bangkok	Team pursuit
Silver medal – second place	2008 Nara	Team pursuit
Silver medal – second place	2010 Sharjah	Points race
Silver medal – second place	2015 Nakhon Ratchasima	Madison
Bronze medal – third place	1999 Maebashi	Team pursuit
Bronze medal – third place	2001 Kaohsiung	Elimination
Bronze medal – third place	2003 Changwon	Madison
Bronze medal – third place	2006 Kuala Lumpur	Madison
Bronze medal – third place	2007 Bangkok	Individual pursuit
Bronze medal – third place	2012 Kuala Lumpur	Madison

Amir Zargari (Persian: امیر زرگری, born July 31, 1980) is an Iranian former professional racing cyclist. He rode for UCI ProTeam Ag2r–La Mondiale for the 2012 season.

== Major results ==
=== Track ===
1998
3rd Points race, Asian Games
1999
3rd Team pursuit, Asian Track Championships
2000
3rd Team pursuit, UCI Track Cycling World Cup Classics, Ipoh
2001
Asian Track Championships

2nd Madison (with Alireza Haghi)
3rd Elimination race

2002
Asian Track Championships

1st Elimination race
2nd Team pursuit

2nd Team pursuit, Asian Games
2003
Asian Track Championships

2nd Elimination race
2nd Team pursuit
3rd Madison (with Abbas Saeidi Tanha)

2004
2nd Team pursuit, Asian Track Championships
2005
2nd Team pursuit, Asian Track Championships
2006
Asian Games

2nd Team pursuit
3rd Madison (with Mehdi Sohrabi)

Asian Track Championships

2nd Team pursuit
3rd Madison (with Mehdi Sohrabi)

2007
Asian Track Championships

2nd Team pursuit
3rd Individual pursuit
3rd Madison (with Mehdi Sohrabi)

2008
2nd Team pursuit, Asian Track Championships
2010
2nd Points race, Asian Track Championships
2012
3rd Madison, Asian Track Championships (with Abbas Saeidi Tanha)
2015
2nd Madison, Asian Track Championships (with Arvin Moazzami)

=== Road ===
1999
1st Stage 7 Tour of Turkey
2001
6th Overall Tour of Saudi Arabia
2005
National Road Championships

2nd Road race
2nd Time trial

6th Overall Tour of Turkey
9th Overall Kerman Tour
2006
1st Stage 3 Kerman Tour
Asian Road Championships

2nd Team time trial
8th Road race

6th Overall Tour of Azerbaijan (Iran)

1st Stage 7

8th Overall Tour de East Java

1st Stage 2

2007
1st Stage 2 Milad De Nour Tour
2008
2nd Overall Tour de Indonesia
5th Overall Tour of Thailand
7th Overall Tour of Hainan
10th Overall Kerman Tour

1st Stage 2

2009
National Road Championships

2nd Time trial
5th Road race

2nd Overall Tour de Singkarak
4th Overall Milad De Nour Tour
4th Overall Tour of Azerbaijan (Iran)
4th Overall Tour de East Java
6th Overall Tour de Indonesia
8th Overall Presidential Cycling Tour of Iran
2010
2nd Overall Tour of Azerbaijan (Iran)

1st Stage 2

3rd Overall Tour de Singkarak

1st Stages 3 & 5

3rd Overall Kerman Tour

1st Stage 1

4th Road race, Asian Road Championships
4th Overall Milad De Nour Tour
5th Overall Tour de Langkawi
2011
1st Overall Tour de Singkarak

1st Stages 2 & 5

3rd Overall Milad De Nour Tour
3rd Overall Tour de Filipinas
3rd Overall International Presidency Tour
4th Time trial, National Road Championships
9th Overall Tour of Qinghai Lake
2012
National Road Championships

2nd Road race
5th Time trial

7th Road race, Asian Road Championships
2013
National Road Championships

2nd Road race
2nd Time trial

2nd Taiwan KOM Challenge
7th Overall Tour of Qinghai Lake
8th Overall Tour de Ijen
2014
1st Overall Tour de Singkarak
3rd Time trial, National Road Championships
3rd Overall Tour de Ijen
5th Overall Tour de East Java
2015
2nd Overall Tour de Singkarak

1st Stage 2

4th Overall Tour of Japan
5th Time trial, National Road Championships
8th Overall Tour de Korea
8th Overall Tour of Iran (Azerbaijan)
9th Overall Tour of Fuzhou
