= 2007 Jelajah Malaysia =

2006–07 UCI Asia Tour

Race details
- Dates: 6–12 January 2007
- Stages: 7
- Distance: 863.8 km (536.7 mi)
- Winning time: 18h 36' 09"

Results
| Jersey awarded to the overall winner | Winner | Mehdi Sohrabi (IRI) | (Iran) |
| | Second | Hossein Askari (IRI) | (Giant Asia Racing Team) |
| | Third | Thomas Just (DEN) | (Denmark) |
| Jersey awarded to the points classification winner | Points | Anuar Manan (MAS) | (LeTua Cycling Team) |
| Jersey awarded to the mountains classification winner | Mountains | Ghader Mizbani (IRI) | (Giant Asia Racing Team) |
| | Team | Giant Asia Racing Team | |

The 2007 Jelajah Malaysia, a cycling stage race that took place in Malaysia. It was held from 6 to 12 January 2007. There were seven stages with a total of 863.8 kilometres. In fact, the race was sanctioned by the Union Cycliste Internationale as a 2.2 category race and was part of the 2006–07 UCI Asia Tour calendar.

Mehdi Sohrabi of Iran won the race, followed by Hossein Askari of Iran second and Thomas Just (cyclist) of Denmark third overall. Anuar Manan of Malaysia won the points classification and Ghader Mizbani of Iran won the mountains classification. Giant Asia Racing Team won the team classification.

== Stages ==
| Stage | Date | Start | Finish | Distance | Stage Top 3 |
|---|---|---|---|---|---|
| 1 | 6 January | Bentong | Kuantan | 194.7 km (121.0 mi) | (Japan) Makoto Iijima (Hong Kong) Lam Kai Tsun (Iran) Mehdi Sohrabi |
| 2 | 7 January | Kuantan | Kuala Terengganu | 52 km (32.3 mi) | (Malaysia) Mohamed Harrif Salleh (Netherlands) Wim Spijkerboer (Germany) Stefan Rothe |
| 3 | 8 January | Kuala Terengganu | Kota Bharu | 161.4 km (100.3 mi) | (Malaysia) Anuar Manan (Japan) Satoshi Hirose (Russia) Serguei Kudentsov |
| 4 | 9 January | Jeli | Gerik | 139.3 km (86.6 mi) | (Iran) Hossein Askari (Iran) Mehdi Sohrabi (Iran) Ghader Mizbani |
| 5 | 10 January | Sungai Petani | Taiping | 117.3 km (72.9 mi) | (Hong Kong) Wong Kam-po (Russia) Serguei Kudentsov (Iran) Mehdi Sohrabi |
| 6 | 11 January | Ipoh | Kuala Kubu Bharu | 141.6 km (88.0 mi) | (Malaysia) Anuar Manan (Russia) Serguei Kudentsov (Hong Kong) Wong Kam-po |
| 7 | 12 January | Putrajaya Criterium | | 57.5 km (35.7 mi) | (Taiwan) Lai Kuan-hua (Japan) Satoshi Hirose (United Arab Emirates) Badr Mohamed Mirza Bani Hammad |

== Final standings ==
=== General classification ===
| Rank | Rider | Team | Time |
|---|---|---|---|
| 1 | (Iran) Mehdi Sohrabi | Iran | 18h 36' 09" |
| 2 | (Iran) Hossein Askari | Giant Asia Racing Team | + 28" |
| 3 | (Denmark) Thomas Just (cyclist) | Denmark | + 03' 58" |
| 4 | (Hong Kong) Wong Kam-po | Hong Kong Pro Cycling | + 04' 02" |
| 5 | (New Zealand) Nathan Dahlberg | New Zealand | + 04' 13" |
| 6 | (Iran) Hossein Jahanbanian | Iran | + 04' 14" |
| 7 | (Hong Kong) Chan Chun Hing | Hong Kong Pro Cycling | s.t. |
| 8 | (Republic of Ireland) Paul Griffin | Giant Asia Racing Team | s.t. |
| 9 | (Japan) Yoshiyuki Abe | Skil–Shimano | + 04' 16" |
| 10 | (Kazakhstan) Vyacheslav Dyadichkin | Polygon Sweet Nice | s.t. |
