= Cycling at the 2006 Asian Games – Men's team pursuit =

Men's team pursuit at the 2006 Asian Games
- Venue: Aspire Hall 1
- Date: 11–12 December 2006
- Competitors: 33 from 8 nations

Medalists
gold medal	South Korea; Hwang In-hyeok, Jang Sun-jae, Kim Dong-hun, Park Sung-baek
silver medal	Iran; Hossein Nateghi, Abbas Saeidi Tanha, Mehdi Sohrabi, Amir Zargari
bronze medal	China; Chen Xiaoyong, Wang Youguo, Wen Hairui, Zeng Zhaoyu

The men's 4 km team pursuit competition at the 2006 Asian Games was held on 11 and 12 December at the Aspire Hall 1.

== Schedule ==
All times are Arabia Standard Time (UTC+03:00)

Date	Time	Event
Monday, 11 December 2006	10:05	Qualifying
Tuesday, 12 December 2006	12:30	Finals

== Records ==
Prior to this competition, the existing world, Asian and Games records were as follows.

World Record	Australia	3:56.610	Athens, Greece	22 August 2004
Asian Record	South Korea	4:12.762	Sydney, Australia	18 November 2006
Games Record	Kazakhstan	4:20.292	Busan, South Korea	7 October 2002

== Results ==
=== Qualifying ===
Rank	Team	Time	Notes
1	South Korea (KOR); Hwang In-hyeok; Jang Sun-jae; Kim Dong-hun; Park Sung-baek	4:14.534	GR
2	Iran (IRI); Hossein Nateghi; Abbas Saeidi Tanha; Mehdi Sohrabi; Amir Zargari	4:16.519	
3	China (CHN); Chen Xiaoyong; Wang Youguo; Wen Hairui; Zeng Zhaoyu	4:17.754	
4	Japan (JPN); Noriyuki Iijima; Kazuhiro Mori; Taiji Nishitani; Kei Uchida	4:19.464	
5	Malaysia (MAS); Mohd Akmal Amrun; Amir Mustafa Rusli; Harrif Saleh; Thum Weng Kin	4:23.974	
6	Chinese Taipei (TPE); Chen Chien-ting; Lee Wei-cheng; Lin Heng-hui; Liu Chin-feng	4:24.940	
7	Philippines (PHI); Alfie Catalan; Paterno Curtan; Carlo Jazul; Arnold Marcelo	4:31.177	
8	Hong Kong (HKG); Lam Kai Tsun; Tang Wang Yip; Wu Kin San; Chan Chun Hing	4:33.617	

=== Finals ===
==== Bronze ====
Rank	Team	Time	Notes
3rd place, bronze medalist(s)	China (CHN); Chen Xiaoyong; Wang Youguo; Wen Hairui; Zeng Zhaoyu	4:14.489	GR
4	Japan (JPN); Kazuhiro Mori; Taiji Nishitani; Reona Sumi; Kei Uchida	4:19.853	

==== Gold ====
Rank	Team	Time	Notes
1st place, gold medalist(s)	South Korea (KOR); Hwang In-hyeok; Jang Sun-jae; Kim Dong-hun; Park Sung-baek	4:12.746	AR
2nd place, silver medalist(s)	Iran (IRI); Hossein Nateghi; Abbas Saeidi Tanha; Mehdi Sohrabi; Amir Zargari	4:14.226	
