= Hossein Jahanbanian =

Iranian cyclist

Personal information
- Born: 2 April 1976 (age 50) Iran

Cycling career
- Sport: Cycling
- Discipline: Road
- Role: Rider

Professional teams
- 2008–2012: Tabriz Petrochemical Team
- 2014–2015: Tabriz Shahrdari Ranking
- 2016: RTS–Santic Racing Team

Hossein Jahanbanian (born April 2, 1976) is an Iranian former professional road cyclist.

== Major results ==
2005
1st Stage 3 Milad De Nour Tour
2006
3rd Road race, National Road Championships
7th Overall Tour of Iran (Azerbaijan)
8th Overall Kerman Tour
2007
1st Stage 1 Kerman Tour
1st Stage 3 Milad De Nour Tour
6th Overall Jelajah Malaysia
2008
3rd Overall Tour d'Indonesia

1st Stage 3

7th Overall Milad De Nour Tour
2009
9th Overall Tour of Iran (Azerbaijan)
2010
National Road Championships

2nd Road race
3rd Time trial

2011
1st Overall Tour de East Java
3rd Overall Tour de Brunei
9th Overall Tour of Thailand
2014
4th Road race, National Road Championships
