= Tabriz Petrochemical CCN Team =

Iranian cycling team

Team information
- UCI code: TPT
- Registered: Iran
- Founded: 2002
- Disbanded: 2016
- Discipline: Road
- Status: Cont

Key personnel
- General manager: Ramin Dadgar & Azim Abdolnezhad

Team name history
- 2008–2015 2016: Tabriz Petrochemical Team; Tabriz Petrochemical CCN Team

Tabriz Petrochemical CCN Team (Persian:تیم دوچرخه‌سواری پتروشیمی تبریز) UCI team code: TPT was an Iranian UCI Continental cycling team managed by Ramin Dadgar and Azim Abdolnezhad and main sponsored by Tabriz Petrochemical Company. The Tabriz Petrochemical Team has achieved first place in both the riders' and teams' overall classifications in the UCI Asia Tour in 2007–2008, 2008–2009 and 2009–2010

== History ==
The Tabriz Petrochemical Team was established in 2002 as a club team in Tabriz, Iran. The team started participating in domestic tours and national leagues, as well as some smaller international tours, including the Presidential Cycling Tour of Turkey, Tour of Perlis, Jelajah Malaysia and Tour de Langkawi. After four years the team registered as a UCI Continental team for the 2007–2008 season.

The team started the 2007–2008 season with a complete roster of domestic riders. In total, the team amassed 909.64 points participating in 5 foreign and 2 domestic international races. As a result, the team won the 2007–2008 UCI Asia Tour. At the end of the season the first three places in the individual ranking were occupied by three Tabriz Petrochemical Cycling Team riders.

For the 2008–2009 season, the team roster remained the same, with the addition of one rider from Kazakhstan. The team again participated in 5 foreign and 2 domestic international UCI tours and in total scored 1015 points, this was approximately double of the second placed team. As in the previous season, the first three places in the individual ranking were occupied by Tabriz riders.

=== Doping ===
On 3 June 2013, Hossein Askari returned an adverse analytical finding for the banned substance Methylhexaneamine at the Tour de Singkarak. He was handed a 1-year ban making him eligible to race again 2 June 2014.

On 20 June 2014 Vahid Ghaffari returned an adverse analytical finding for EPO and has been provisionally suspended from competition.

Ahad Kazemi is also currently serving an eight-year ban for an ADRV for testosterone from a sample taken at the 2016 Tour of Iran.

== Team roster ==
As of 2015.

Rider	Date of birth
Ahad Kazemi (IRI)	22 May 1975 (age 51)
Ali Khademi (IRI)	1 January 1992 (age 34)
Behnam Khalili (IRI)	7 February 1989 (age 37)
Karim Khorrami (IRI)	4 June 1991 (age 35)
Amir Kolahdouz (IRI)	7 January 1993 (age 33)
Behnam Maleki (IRI)	2 December 1992 (age 33)
Ghader Mizbani (IRI)	6 December 1975 (age 50)

Rider	Date of birth
Sahebali Najafi (IRI)	25 June 1992 (age 34)
Abolfazl Nazari Daghalian (IRI)	4 May 1991 (age 35)
Samad Pourseyedi (IRI)	15 October 1985 (age 40)
Mohammad Pouresmaeil (IRI)	22 March 1992 (age 34)
Hamid Shirisisan (IRI)	21 March 1982 (age 44)
Mehdi Sohrabi (IRI)	12 October 1981 (age 44)

== Major wins ==
2008
Stage 6 Jelajah Malaysia, Hossein Askari
Overall Umm Al Quwain Race, Hossein Askari

Stages 1 & 2, Hossein Nateghi

Overall Taftan Tour, Hossein Nateghi

Stages 1 & 2, Hossein Nateghi
Stage 5, Behnam Khosroshahi

Overall Tour de East Java, Ghader Mizbani

Stage 4, Ghader Mizbani

Overall President Tour of Iran, Ahad Kazemi

Stage 4, Ahad Kazemi
Stage 5, Ghader Mizbani

Overall Azerbaïjan Tour, Hossein Askari

Prologue & Stage 3, Ghader Mizbani
Stage 2, Team time trial
Stage 4, Behnam Khosroshahi
Stage 7, Hossein Askari
Stage 8, Hamid Shiri

Stages 1 & 4 Tour of Thailand, Hossein Nateghi
Overall Milad De Nour Tour, Ahad Kazemi

Stage 2, Ahad Kazemi

Overall Kerman Tour, Ghader Mizbani

Stage 2, Team time trial
Stage 4, Hossein Nateghi

Overall Tour de Indonesia, Ghader Mizbani

Stage 3, Hossein Jahanbanian
Stages 5 & 10, Ghader Mizbani

2009
Stage 2 Jelajah Malaysia, Mehdi Sohrabi
Overall Tour de Singkarak, Ghader Mizbani

Stage 3a, Ghader Mizbani

Overall President Tour of Iran, Ghader Mizbani

Stage 1, Hossein Askari
Stage 3, Ghader Mizbani

Overall Tour of Qinghai Lake, Andrey Mizurov

Prologue, Andrey Mizurov
Stages 3 & 8, Ghader Mizbani

Overall Tour de East Java, Andrey Mizurov

Stage 2, Andrey Mizurov

Overall Milad De Nour Tour, Mehdi Sohrabi

Stage 1, Arvin Moazzami
Stages 2 & 4, Mehdi Sohrabi
Stage 3, Samad Pourseyedi

Overall Azerbaijan Tour, Ahad Kazemi

Stage 2, Ahad Kazemi
Stage 4, Mehdi Sohrabi
Stage 5, Ghader Mizbani

Overall Tour de Indonesia, Mehdi Sohrabi

Stage 1, Team time trial
Stage 4, Ghader Mizbani
Stage 6, Mehdi Sohrabi

2010
Overall Azerbaijan Tour, Ghader Mizbani

Stages 1, 5 & 6, Ghader Mizbani
Stage 3, Andrey Mizurov

Overall President Tour of Iran, Hossein Askari

Stages 2 & 3, Tobias Erler
Stage 4, Hossein Askari

Overall Tour de Kumano, Andrey Mizurov
Overall Tour de Singkarak, Ghader Mizbani

Stage 1, Team Time Trial
Stage 3, Ghader Mizbani
Stage 6, Mehdi Sohrabi

Overall Tour de East Java, Hossein Alizadeh

Stage 1, Hossein Alizadeh

Stage 3 Milad De Nour Tour, Ebrahim Javani
Overall Tour of Qinghai Lake, Hossein Askari

Stage 3, Ghader Mizbani
Stages 6 & 9, Mehdi Sohrabi

2011
Stage 9 Tour de Langkawi, Boris Shpilevsky
Overall Kerman Tour, Mehdi Sohrabi

Stages 1, 2, 3, 4 & 5, Mehdi Sohrabi

Overall Jelajah Malaysia, Mehdi Sohrabi

Stages 1 & 6, Mehdi Sohrabi

Overall Tour de Taiwan, Markus Eibegger

Stage 2, Mehdi Sohrabi
Stage 3, Markus Eibegger

Overall Tour of Thailand, Tobias Erler

Prologue, Tobias Erler

Stage 1 Tour de Korea, Tobias Erler
Overall Azerbaijan Tour, Mehdi Sohrabi

Stage 3, Team Time Trial

Stage 4 President Tour of Iran, Mehdi Sohrabi
Stage 7 Tour of Qinghai Lake, Mehdi Sohrabi
Overall Milad De Nour Tour, Ghader Mizbani

Stage 1, Ghader Mizbani

Stage 5 Tour de Brunei, Ramin Maleki
Stages 4, 5, 6 & 7 Tour of China, Boris Shpilevsky
Overall Tour de East Java, Hossein Jahanbanian

Stage 1, Boris Shpilevsky

Stage 1 Tour of Taihu Lake, Boris Shpilevsky
2012
Overall Tour of Qinghai Lake, Hossein Alizadeh

Stage 3, Hossein Alizadeh

Stage 2 Tour de East Java, Hossein Nateghi
Overall Tour de Brunei, Hossein Askari

Stage 2, Hossein Askari

Stage 3, Hossein Nateghi
2013
Overall Tour de Filipinas, Ghader Mizbani

Stage 3, Mehdi Sohrabi
Stage 4, Ghader Mizbani

Overall Tour of Iran, Ghader Mizbani

Stage 5, Ghader Mizbani

Overall Tour de Singkarak, Ghader Mizbani

Stage 1, Hossein Askari
Stage 5, Amir Kolahdouz
Stage 7, Mehdi Sohrabi

Overall Tour of Qinghai Lake, Samad Pourseyedi

Stage 3, Samad Pourseyedi

Overall Tour of Borneo, Ghader Mizbani

Stages 2 & 5, Mehdi Sohrabi
Stage 4, Ghader Mizbani

Overall Tour de Ijen, Samad Pourseyedi

Stage 2, Samad Pourseyedi

2014
Overall Tour de Langkawi, Samad Pourseyedi

Stage 4, Samad Pourseyedi

Overall Tour of Japan, Samad Pourseyedi

Stage 4, Samad Pourseyedi
Stage 5, Ghader Mizbani

Overall Tour of Iran, Ghader Mizbani

Stage 5, Ghader Mizbani

Overall Tour de East Java, Ghader Mizbani

Stage 2, Ghader Mizbani

Stage 4 Tour de Ijen, Mehdi Sohrabi
Overall Tour of Fuzhou, Samad Pourseyedi

Stage 2, Samad Pourseyedi

2015
Stage 4 Tour de Filipinas, Samad Pourseyedi
Overall Tour de Taiwan, Samad Pourseyedi

Stage 4, Samad Pourseyedi

Overall Tour of Japan, Samad Pourseyedi
Overall Tour of Iran, Samad Pourseyedi

Stage 5, Samad Pourseyedi

Stage 3 Tour de Singkarak, Mehdi Sohrabi
Stage 4 Tour de Singkarak, Amir Kolahdouz
Stage 5 Tour de Singkarak, Behnam Maleki
Stage 8 Tour de Singkarak, Ahad Kazemi

== National champions ==
2009
Iran Time Trial Championships, Mehdi Sohrabi
Kazakhstan Time Trial Championships, Andrey Mizourov
2010
Kazakhstan Time Trial Championships, Andrey Mizourov
Iran Time Trial Championships, Hossein Askari
Iran Road Race Championships, Mehdi Sohrabi
2011
Iran Time Trial Championships, Hossein Askari
2012
Iran Road Race Championships, Hossein Alizadeh
2013
Iran Road Race Championships, Ghader Mizbani
2014
Iran Time Trial Championships, Alireza Haghi
2015
Iran Road Race Championships, Behnam Maleki

== See also ==
- Petrochimi Tabriz F.C.
- Petroshimi Tabriz FSC
