= Behnam Khosroshahi =

Iranian cyclist

Personal information
- Full name: Behnam Khalili Khosroshahi
- Born: June 2, 1989 (age 37) Sanandaj, Iran

Cycling career
- Sport: Cycling
- Current team: Tommi's Radltankstelle Team
- Discipline: Road
- Role: Rider

Professional teams
- 2008–2012: Tabriz Petrochemical Team
- 2013: Azad University Giant Team
- 2013: Ayandeh Continental Team
- 2014–2016: Tabriz Petrochemical Team
- 2017: Tabriz Shahrdari Ranking
- 2022–2023: Azad University Team
- 2025–: Tommi's Radltankstelle Team

Behnam Khalili Khosroshahi (Persian: بهنام خلیلی خسروشاهی, born 2 June 1989) is an Iranian cyclist, who currently rides for UCI Continental team Tommi's Radltankstelle Team.

== Major results ==
2006
3rd Overall Mazandaran Tour

1st Prologue & Stage 3

2007
Asian Junior Games

1st Time trial
2nd Road Race

2008
1st Stage 5 Tour of Iran (Azerbaijan)
1st Stage 3 Milad De Nour Tour
7th Overall Taftan Tour

1st Stage 5

9th Overall Kerman Tour

1st Stage 4

2009
1st Stage 5 Milad De Nour Tour
4th Time trial, National Road Championships
2010
1st Stage 1 (TTT) Tour de Singkarak
2011
5th Time trial, National Road Championships
2012
2nd Time trial, National Road Championships
2013
1st Time trial, National Road Championships
2014
2nd Time trial, National Road Championships
2021
5th Time trial, National Road Championships
2022
1st Road race, National Road Championships
