= Ahad Kazemi =

Iranian cyclist

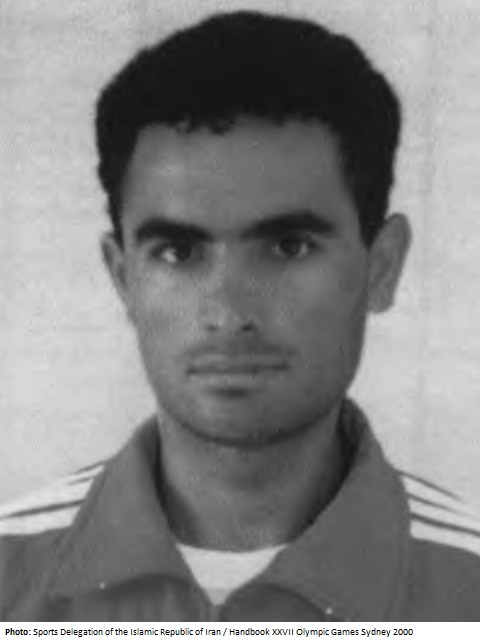
- UCI photo

Personal information
- Full name: Ahad Kazemi Sarai
- Born: 22 May 1975 (age 51) Sarai, Heris, East Azerbaijan, Iran
- Height: 180 cm (5 ft 11 in)
- Weight: 71 kg (157 lb)

Cycling career
- Sport: Cycling
- Discipline: Road
- Role: Rider

Amateur team

Professional teams
- 2000–2007: Giant Asia Racing Team
- 2008–2010: Tabriz Petrochemical Team
- 2015: Tabriz Petrochemical Team
- 2016: Tabriz Shahrdari Team

Ahad Kazemi Sarai also known as Ahad Kazemi (born 22 May 1975 in Heris County) is an Iranian cyclist, who is currently suspended from the sport due to an anti-doping rules violation.

He competed in the road race at the 2000 Summer Olympics, but failed to finish.

== Doping ==
Kazemi is currently serving an eight-year ban for an ADRV for testosterone from a sample taken at the 2016 Tour of Iran.

== Major results ==
1998
1st Overall Tour of Azerbaijan
1999
1st Overall Tour of Azerbaijan
2000
1st Stage 7 Presidential Cycling Tour of Turkey
3rd Overall Tour of Azerbaijan
2001
1st Overall Tour of Azerbaijan
National Road Championships

2nd Time trial
3rd Road race

4th Overall Tour of Saudi Arabia
2002
2nd Road race, Asian Road Championships
2003
1st Overall Tour of Azerbaijan
2004
1st Overall Presidential Cycling Tour of Turkey
2005
1st Overall Tour de East Java

1st Mountains classification
1st Stage 2

1st Overall Tour de Taiwan

1st Stage 4

1st Stage 6 Milad De Nour Tour
2nd Overall Tour of Azerbaijan (Iran)
6th Overall Kerman Tour
2006
1st Road race, National Road Championships
1st Stage 5 (TTT) Milad De Nour Tour
2nd Overall Tour of Azerbaijan (Iran)

1st Prologue

3rd Overall 2005–06 UCI Asia Tour
3rd Overall Kerman Tour
4th Overall Tour de East Java
6th Road race, Asian Road Championships
2007
1st Overall Tour of Thailand

1st Stage 4

1st Overall Tour of Islamabad
2nd Road race, National Road Championships
2nd Overall Milad De Nour Tour

1st Stage 4

5th Overall Tour of Azerbaijan (Iran)

1st Stages 3 & 8

6th Overall Kerman Tour
6th Overall Presidential Cycling Tour of Turkey
2008
1st Overall International Presidency Tour

1st Stage 4

1st Overall Milad De Nour Tour

1st Stage 2

2nd Road race, National Road Championships
2nd Overall Tour de East Java
3rd Overall Tour of Azerbaijan (Iran)

1st Stage 2 (TTT)

2009
1st Overall Tour of Azerbaijan (Iran)

1st Stage 2

1st Stage 1 (TTT) Tour de Indonesia
2015
2nd Road race, National Road Championships
2nd Overall Tour of Fuzhou

1st Stage 2

4th Overall Tour de Singkarak

1st Stage 8

8th Overall Tour de Filipinas
2016
~~2nd Overall Tour of Iran (Azerbaijan)~~
4th Road race, National Road Championships
~~5th Overall Tour of Fuzhou~~
