= Cycling at the 2002 Asian Games – Men's team pursuit =

Men's team pursuit at the 2002 Asian Games
- Venue: Geumjeong Velodrome
- Date: 5–7 October 2002
- Competitors: 33 from 7 nations

Medalists
gold medal	China; Guo Jianbin, Ma Yajun, Shi Guijun, Wang Fei
silver medal	Iran; Hossein Askari, Alireza Haghi, Abbas Saeidi Tanha, Amir Zargari
bronze medal	Kazakhstan; Vladimir Bushanskiy, Andrey Kashechkin, Vadim Kravchenko, Dmitriy Muravyev

The men's 4 kilometres team pursuit competition at the 2002 Asian Games was held on 5 and 7 October at the Geumjeong Velodrome.

== Schedule ==
All times are Korea Standard Time (UTC+09:00)

Date	Time	Event
Saturday, 5 October 2002	11:40	Qualification
Monday, 7 October 2002	10:00	1/4 finals
Monday, 7 October 2002	12:30	Finals

== Records ==
Prior to this competition, the existing world, Asian and Games records were as follows.

World Record	Australia	3:59.583	Manchester, United Kingdom	1 August 2002
Asian Record	South Korea	4:15.620	Taichung, Taiwan	9 July 2001
Games Record	South Korea	4:22.901	Hiroshima, Japan	14 October 1994

== Results ==
Legend

- DNF — Did not finish

=== Qualification ===
Rank	Team	Time	Notes
1	Kazakhstan (KAZ); Vladimir Bushanskiy; Andrey Kashechkin; Dmitriy Muravyev; Sergey Tretyakov	4:22.608	GR
2	Iran (IRI); Alireza Haghi; Abbas Saeidi Tanha; Mehdi Sohrabi; Amir Zargari	4:25.727	
3	China (CHN); Guo Jianbin; Ma Yajun; Shi Guijun; Wang Fei	4:26.221	
4	South Korea (KOR); Cho Ho-sung; Chun Dae-hong; Kwak Hun-sin; Song Kyung-bang	4:26.844	
5	Hong Kong (HKG); Ho Siu Lun; Leung Chi Hang; Tsoi Chun Ming; Wong Ngai Ching	4:35.195	
6	Indonesia (INA); Teguh Eko Pambudi; Kohar; Rochmat Nugraha; Suwandra	4:37.693	
7	Chinese Taipei (TPE); Chen Chien-chung; Fang Chun-chiao; Liu Chin-feng; Tsai Shao-yu	4:37.769	

=== 1/4 finals ===
==== Heat 1 ====
Rank	Team	Time	Notes
1	South Korea (KOR); Cho Ho-sung; Chun Dae-hong; Kwak Hun-sin; Song Kyung-bang	DNF	
2	Hong Kong (HKG); Ho Siu Lun; Leung Chi Hang; Tsoi Chun Ming; Wong Ngai Ching	Overlapped	

==== Heat 2 ====
Rank	Team	Time	Notes
1	China (CHN); Guo Jianbin; Ma Yajun; Shi Guijun; Wang Fei	4:24.398	
2	Indonesia (INA); Teguh Eko Pambudi; Kohar; Rochmat Nugraha; Suwandra	Overlapped	

==== Heat 3 ====
Rank	Team	Time	Notes
1	Iran (IRI); Alireza Haghi; Abbas Saeidi Tanha; Mehdi Sohrabi; Amir Zargari	4:24.462	
2	Chinese Taipei (TPE); Chen Chien-chung; Huang Chi-sheng; Liu Chin-feng; Tsai Shao-yu	Overlapped	

==== Heat 4 ====
Rank	Team	Time	Notes
1	Kazakhstan (KAZ); Vladimir Bushanskiy; Andrey Kashechkin; Dmitriy Muravyev; Sergey Tretyakov	4:30.472	

==== Summary ====
Rank	Team	Time
1	China (CHN)	4:24.398
2	Iran (IRI)	4:24.462
3	Kazakhstan (KAZ)	4:30.472
4	South Korea (KOR)	DNF

=== Finals ===
==== Final (3~4) ====
Rank	Team	Time	Notes
3rd place, bronze medalist(s)	Kazakhstan (KAZ); Vladimir Bushanskiy; Andrey Kashechkin; Vadim Kravchenko; Dmitriy Muravyev	4:20.292	GR
4	South Korea (KOR); Jang Il-nam; Kwak Hun-sin; Song Kyung-bang; Suh Seok-kyu	4:22.521	

==== Final (1~2) ====
Rank	Team	Time	Notes
1st place, gold medalist(s)	China (CHN); Guo Jianbin; Ma Yajun; Shi Guijun; Wang Fei	4:20.753	
2nd place, silver medalist(s)	Iran (IRI); Hossein Askari; Alireza Haghi; Abbas Saeidi Tanha; Amir Zargari	4:23.108	
