= Hossein Askari =

Iranian professional racing cyclist

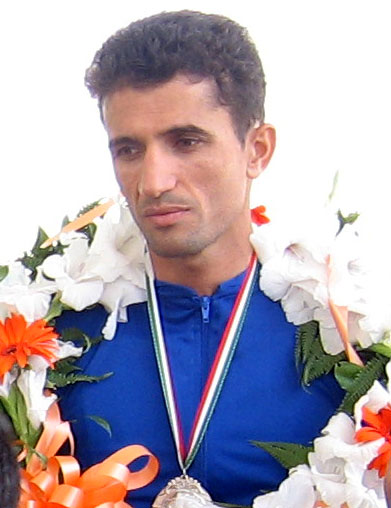

Personal information
- Full name: Hossein Askari
- Born: March 23, 1975 (age 51) Khomeyn, Iran
- Height: 1.79 m (5 ft 10 in)
- Weight: 73 kg (161 lb)

Cycling career
- Sport: Cycling
- Discipline: Road
- Role: Rider

Professional teams
- 2005–2007: Giant Asia Racing Team
- 2008–2013: Tabriz Petrochemical Team
- 2014: Ayandeh Continental Team
- 2015–2016: Pishgaman–Giant
- 2023: Omidnia
- 2025: Tommi's Radltankstelle Team

Major wins
- Kerman Tour (2005); Tour de Indonesia (2005); Tour of Azerbaijan (2007, 2008); National Time Trial Championships (2007, 2010, 2011, 2015); Tour de Brunei (2012)
Medal record
Representing Iran
Men's road bicycle racing
Asian Games
| Silver medal – second place | 2006 Doha | Team time trial |
| Bronze medal – third place | 2010 Guangzhou | Individual time trial |
| Bronze medal – third place | 2014 Incheon | Individual time trial |
Men's track cycling
Asian Games
| Silver medal – second place | 2002 Busan | Team pursuit |

Hossein Askari (Persian: حسین عسگری, born March 23, 1975) is an Iranian professional racing cyclist, who last rode for UCI Continental team Tommi's Radltankstelle Team.

== Major results ==
1999
6th Overall Tour of Saudi Arabia

1st Stage 1

2000
9th Overall Tour of Azerbaijan
2001
3rd Overall Tour of Saudi Arabia
2002
1st Prologue Azerbaijan Tour
2nd Team pursuit, Asian Games
8th Overall Tour of Saudi Arabia
2003
5th Overall Azerbaijan Tour
2004
1st Overall Tour of Milad du Nour

1st Prologue
1st Stage 2
1st Stage 5

2nd Time trial, Asian Road Championships
2nd Individual pursuit, Asian Track Championships
2nd Overall Presidential Cycling Tour of Turkey
9th Tour de Hokkaido
2005
1st Overall Kerman Tour
1st Overall Tour de Indonesia

1st Stage 3

Asian Road Championships

2nd Time trial
6th Road race

2nd Individual pursuit, Asian Track Championships
7th Overall Tour of Azerbaijan (Iran)

1st Prologue

8th Overall Tour de East Java
8th Overall Tour de Taiwan
2006
2nd Overall 2005–06 UCI Asia Tour
Asian Games

2nd Team time trial
7th Road race

2nd Time trial, National Road Championships
2nd Overall Tour of Thailand
2nd Overall Kerman Tour

1st Stages 2 & 4

2nd Overall Presidential Cycling Tour of Turkey
2nd Overall Tour de East Java
2nd Overall Tour of Qinghai Lake
4th Road race, Asian Road Championships
4th Overall Tour of Azerbaijan (Iran)

1st Stage 2

2007
1st Time trial, National Road Championships
1st Overall 2006–07 UCI Asia Tour
1st Overall Tour of Azerbaijan (Iran)

1st Stage 2

1st Stage 2 Kerman Tour
Asian Road Championships

2nd Road race
2nd Time trial

2nd Overall Jelajah Malaysia

1st Stage 4

3rd Overall Presidential Cycling Tour of Turkey

1st Mountains classification

3rd Overall Tour de East Java
3rd Overall Milad De Nour Tour
6th Overall Tour of Siam
6th Overall Tour de Hokkaido
10th Overall Tour de Langkawi
2008
1st Time trial, National Road Championships
1st Overall 2007–08 UCI Asia Tour
1st Overall International Emirates Post Tour
1st Overall Tour of Azerbaijan (Iran)

1st Stages 2 (TTT) & 6

3rd Overall Tour of Qinghai Lake
4th Overall Jelajah Malaysia

1st Mountains classification
1st Stage 6

4th Overall Tour de East Java
9th Overall International Presidency Tour
2009
1st Stage 1 International Presidency Tour
2nd Overall Tour of Azerbaijan (Iran)
3rd Overall Tour de East Java
4th Overall Jelajah Malaysia
4th Overall Tour de Indonesia

1st Stage 1 (TTT)

5th Overall Milad De Nour Tour
7th Road race, Asian Road Championships
2010
1st Time trial, National Road Championships
1st Stage 4 International Presidency Tour
1st Overall Tour of Qinghai Lake
1st Stage 1 (TTT) Tour de Singkarak
2nd Time trial, Asian Road Championships
2nd Overall Tour de Singkarak
3rd Overall Tour de Langkawi
3rd Overall Tour of Azerbaijan (Iran)
5th Overall Tour of China
10th Mumbai Cyclothon
2011
1st Time trial, National Road Championships
2nd Overall Tour of Azerbaijan (Iran)

1st Stage 3

Asian Road Championships

3rd Road race
3rd Time trial

4th Overall Milad De Nour Tour
6th Overall Tour of Qinghai Lake
7th Overall International Presidency Tour
8th Overall Tour de Langkawi
8th Overall Kerman Tour
2012
1st Overall Tour de Brunei

1st Stage 2

3rd Time trial, Asian Road Championships
3rd Overall Tour of Azerbaijan (Iran)
5th Overall Tour of Qinghai Lake
2013
4th Overall Tour de Filipinas
4th Overall Tour of Borneo
~~7th Overall Tour de Singkarak~~

~~1st Stage 1~~

2014
2nd Overall Tour de Ijen
3rd Time trial, Asian Games
2015
Asian Cycling Championships

1st Road race
1st Time trial

1st Time trial, National Road Championships
2nd Overall Tour de Taiwan
3rd Overall Tour of Japan
3rd Overall Tour de Singkarak

1st Stage 6

5th Overall Tour of Fuzhou
6th Overall Tour de Filipinas

1st Mountains classification

6th Overall Tour of Iran (Azerbaijan)

1st Points classification
1st Stage 4

2022
1st Time trial, National Road Championships
2023
2nd Time trial, National Road Championships
2024
3rd Time trial, National Road Championships
2025
4th Time trial, National Road Championships
