= Hossein Nateghi =

Iranian bicycle racer

Personal information
- Full name: Hossein Nateghi
- Born: 8 February 1987 (age 39) Sanandaj, Iran

Cycling career
- Sport: Cycling
- Current team: DFT PWR CCN Cycling
- Discipline: Road
- Role: Rider
- Rider type: Sprinter

Amateur team
- 2025–: DFT PWR CCN Cycling

Professional teams
- 2007: Mes Kerman
- 2008: Tabriz Petrochemical Team
- 2009–2010: Azad University Iran
- 2011: Vali ASR Kerman
- 2012–2013: Tabriz Petrochemical Team
- 2014: Pishgaman Yazd
- 2015: Sepahan Pro Team
- 2016: Pishgaman–Giant
- 2017: Sepahan Cycling Team
- 2018: Omidnia Mashhad Team
- 2019–2021: Foolad Mobarakeh Sepahan
- 2022: Azad University Team
- 2023: Nusantara Cycling Team

Hossein Nateghi (Persian: حسین ناطقی; born 8 February 1987) is an Iranian cyclist, who rides for club team DFT PWR CCN Cycling.

== Major results ==
2005
1st Time trial, Asian Junior Road Championships
2006
1st Stage 1 Milad de Nour Tour
2007
1st Overall Taftan Tour

1st Prologue & Stage 2

1st Prologue Tour of Turkey
2008
1st Overall Taftan Tour

1st Stages 1 & 2

UAE International Emirates Post Tour

1st Stages 1 & 2

Tour of Thailand

1st Stages 1 & 4

1st Stage 4 Kerman Tour
2009
1st Stage 6 Tour of Thailand
Jelajah Malaysia

1st Stages 3 & 8

1st Stage 4 Tour de Singkarak
1st Stage 5 President Tour of Iran
1st Stage 3 Tour of Iran (Azerbaijan)
3rd Road race, National Road Championshios
2010
Kerman Tour

1st Stages 1 (TTT) & 5

1st Stage 1 Milad De Nour Tour
3rd Road race, Asian Road Championships
2011
Milad De Nour Tour

1st Stages 2 & 4

2012
1st Stage 2 Tour de East Java
1st Stage 3 Tour de Brunei
2018
1st Stage 2 Milad De Nour Tour
2024
3rd Road race, National Road Championshios
