= Tobias Erler =

German cyclist

Personal information
- Born: 17 May 1979 (age 47) Germany

Cycling career
- Sport: Cycling
- Current team: Retired
- Discipline: Road
- Role: Rider

Professional teams
- 2006: Giant Asia Racing Team
- 2007–2008: Team 3C Gruppe–Lamonta
- 2010–2011: Tabriz Petrochemical Team
- 2012–2013: Arbö–Gebrüder Weiss–Oberndorfer

Tobias Erler (born 17 May 1979) is a German former road cyclist.

== Major results ==
2003
1st Stages 2 & 5 Tour de Taiwan
2005
1st Stages 1, 2, 3 & 5 Tour de Taiwan
2006
1st Overall Tour de Korea

1st Stage 3

2nd Time trial, World University Cycling Championships
2007
1st Rund um den Sachsenring
2010
2nd Overall International Presidency Tour

1st Stages 1 & 2

3rd Tour de Mumbai
2011
1st Overall Tour of Thailand

1st Prologue

1st Stages 1 & 8 Tour de Korea
1st Stage 2 Tour of Iran (Azerbaijan) (TTT)
