= 2002 Asian Cycling Championships =

- Venue: Bangkok, Thailand
- Date: 4–10 May 2002

The 2002 Asian Cycling Championships took place at Bangkok, Thailand from 4 to 10 May 2002.

== Medal summary ==
=== Road ===
==== Men ====
Event	Gold	Silver	Bronze
Individual road race	Wang Guozhang; China	Ahad Kazemi; Iran	Wong Kam Po; Hong Kong
Individual time trial	Kazuya Okazaki; Japan	Tonton Susanto; Indonesia	Shi Guijun; China

==== Women ====
Event	Gold	Silver	Bronze
Individual road race	Yang Limei; China	Tamamo Nakamura; Japan	Jiang Yanxia; China
Individual time trial	Li Meifang; China	Yuan Yange; China	Monrudee Chapookam; Thailand

=== Track ===
==== Men ====
Event	Gold	Silver	Bronze
Sprint	Kiyofumi Nagai; Japan	Wu Hsien-tang; Chinese Taipei	Gao Zhiguo; China
1 km time trial	Keiichi Omori; Japan	Lin Chih-hsan; Chinese Taipei	Yan Liheng; China
Keirin	Hiroshi Tsutsumi; Japan	Masaya Kurita; Japan	Shi Qingyu; China
Individual pursuit	Noriyuki Iijima; Japan	Hossein Askari; Iran	Wong Kam Po; Hong Kong
Points race	Makoto Iijima; Japan	Noriyuki Iijima; Japan	Wong Kam Po; Hong Kong
Elimination	Amir Zargari; Iran	Makoto Iijima; Japan	Agus Yulianto; Indonesia
Team sprint	Japan; Keiichi Omori; Kiyofumi Nagai; Tomohiro Nagatsuka	China	Chinese Taipei
Team pursuit	China	Iran; Hossein Askari; Amir Zargari; Abbas Saeidi Tanha; Mousa Arbati; Alireza Haghi	Japan

==== Women ====
Event	Gold	Silver	Bronze
Sprint	Tian Fang; China	Maya Tachikawa; Japan	Lu Yi-wen; Chinese Taipei
500 m time trial	Jiang Yonghua; China	Maya Tachikawa; Japan	Lu Yi-wen; Chinese Taipei
Individual pursuit	Zhao Haijuan; China	Uyun Muzizah; Indonesia	Lan Hsiao-yun; Chinese Taipei
Points race	Yang Limei; China	Lan Hsiao-yun; Chinese Taipei	Zheng Puxiang; China
Elimination	Santia Tri Kusuma; Indonesia	Uyun Muzizah; Indonesia	Yu Hong; China

== Medal table ==
Rank	Nation	Gold	Silver	Bronze	Total
1	China	8	2	7	17
2	Japan	7	6	1	14
3	Indonesia	1	3	1	5
4	Iran	1	3	0	4
5	Chinese Taipei	0	3	4	7
6	Hong Kong	0	0	3	3
7	Thailand	0	0	1	1
Totals (7 entries)		17	17	17	51
