= Lai Kuan-hua =

Taiwanese cyclist

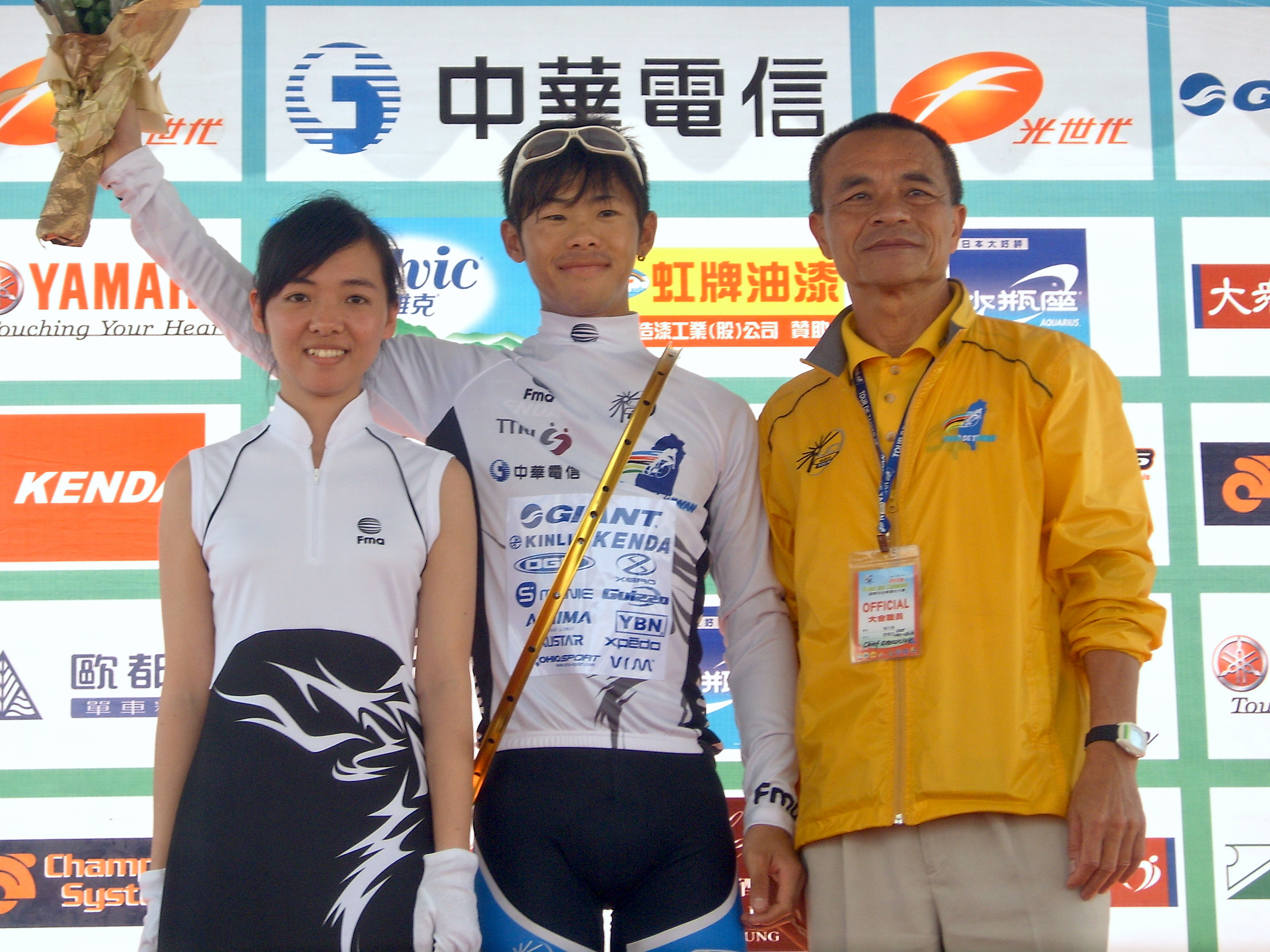
- Lai Kuan-hua at the 2008 Tour de Taiwan.

Personal information
- Born: 23 July 1981 (age 45) Yuanlin, Taiwan

Cycling career
- Sport: Cycling
- Current team: Retired
- Discipline: Road
- Role: Rider

Professional team
- 2002–2010: Giant Asia Racing Team

Lai Kuan-hua (born 23 July 1981) is a Taiwanese former road cyclist, who was a professional from 2002 until 2010 with the Giant Asia Racing Team.

== Major results ==
2004
5th Tour de Okinawa
2005
7th Overall Tour of East Java
2006
5th Overall Tour of Thailand
2007
1st Stage 7 Jelajah Malaysia
2008
10th Overall Tour of East Java
2009
9th Overall Tour de Taiwan
