= Saeid Safarzadeh =

Iranian cyclist

Personal information
- Full name: Saeid Safarzadeh
- Born: 21 September 1985 (age 41) Tabriz, Iran
- Height: 1.78 m (5 ft 10 in)
- Weight: 66 kg (146 lb)

Cycling career
- Sport: Cycling
- Current team: Qinghai Tianyoude Hotel Cycling Team
- Discipline: Road
- Role: Rider

Amateur team
- 2021: Omidnia Mashhad Team

Professional teams
- 2012–2013: Tabriz Petrochemical Team
- 2014–2018: Tabriz Shahrdari Ranking
- 2019–2020: Qinghai Lianshi Sports Cycling Team
- 2022: Arvich Shargh Omidnia
- 2023–: Tianyoude Hotel Cycling Team

Saeid Safarzadeh (born 21 September 1985 in Tabriz) is an Iranian cyclist, who currently rides for UCI Continental team Qinghai Tianyoude Hotel Cycling Team.

== Major results ==
2013
6th Overall Tour de Filipinas
9th Overall Tour of Iran (Azerbaijan)
2014
5th Time trial, National Road Championships
7th Overall Tour de Singkarak
10th Overall Tour de Ijen
2015
7th Overall Tour of Iran (Azerbaijan)

1st Mountains classification
1st Stage 2

2016
5th Road race, National Road Championships
6th Overall Tour of Fuzhou
2017
8th Overall Tour of Iran (Azerbaijan)

1st Stage 3

2018
National Road Championships

1st Road race
5th Time trial

Tour of Iran (Azerbaijan)

1st Mountains classification
1st Stage 5

1st Mountains classification Tour of Mevlana
6th Overall Tour of Mesopotamia
8th Road race, Asian Games
2019
National Road Championships

1st Time trial
2nd Road race

2021
National Road Championships

1st Road race
3rd Time trial

4th Grand Prix Kayseri
2022
2nd Overall Tour of Iran (Azerbaijan)

1st Mountains classification
1st Stage 4

2023
National Road Championships

1st Road race
1st Time trial

1st Overall Tour of Iran (Azerbaijan)

1st Mountains classification
1st Stage 5

1st Stage 2 Tour of Sakarya
2024
1st Time trial, National Road Championships
2025
1st Time trial, National Road Championships
1st Overall Tour of Iran (Azerbaijan)

1st Stage 4
