= 2012 Tour of Azerbaijan (Iran) =

2012 UCI Asia Tour, race 27

Race details
- Dates: 11 May - 16 May
- Stages: 6

Results
	Winner	Javier Ramirez (Spain)
	Second	Abbas Saeidi (Iran)
	Third	Hossein Askari (Iran)

Tour of Azerbaijan 2012 is 27th round of the Tour of Azerbaijan (Iran) which took place between May 11 and May 16, 2012, in Iranian Azerbaijan. The tour had 6 stages.

== Stages of the Tour ==
Stage	Date	Start	Finish	Length	1st place
1	11 May	Tabriz	Urmia	141 km (88 mi)	Javier Ramirez (Spain)
2	12 May	Sarein	Shabestar	174 km (108 mi)	Alois Kaňkovský (CZE)
3	13 May	Tabriz	Miyaneh	155 km (96 mi)	Alois Kaňkovský (CZE)
4	14 May	Qareh Chaman	Ardabil	194 km (121 mi)	Joeri Metloesjenko (UKR)
5	15 May	Sarein	Sahand	188 km (117 mi)	Javier Ramirez (Spain)
6	16 May	Tabriz	Tabriz	76 km (47 mi)	Vojtĕch Hačecký (CZE)

== Final standing ==
Final general classification (1–3)
Rank	Rider	Team	Time
1	Javier Ramirez (Spain)		23h 12' 41"
2	Abbas Saeidi (IRN)		+43"
3	Hossein Askari (IRN)		+1' 10"
