= 2004 Asian Cycling Championships =

- Venue: Yokkaichi, Japan
- Date(s): 9–16 April 2004
- Velodrome: Yokkaichi Keirin Velodrome

The 2004 Asian Cycling Championships took place at the Yokkaichi Keirin Velodrome, Yokkaichi, Japan from 9 to 16 April 2004.

== Medal summary ==
=== Road ===
==== Men ====
Event	Gold	Silver	Bronze
Individual road race	Shinri Suzuki; Japan	Maxim Iglinskiy; Kazakhstan	Valeriy Dmitriyev; Kazakhstan
Individual time trial	Assan Bazayev; Kazakhstan	Hossein Askari; Iran	Ghader Mizbani; Iran

==== Women ====
Event	Gold	Silver	Bronze
Individual road race	Zhang Junying; China	Chanpeng Nontasin; Thailand	Akemi Morimoto; Japan
Individual time trial	Li Meifang; China	Miyoko Karami; Japan	Zhang Junying; China

=== Track ===
==== Men ====
Event	Gold	Silver	Bronze
Sprint	Hiroyuki Inagaki; Japan	Tsubasa Kitatsuru; Japan	Jeon Yeong-gyu; South Korea
1 km time trial	Masaki Inoue; Japan	Keiichiro Yaguchi; Japan	Ma Yajun; China
Keirin	Keiichiro Yaguchi; Japan	Choi Jeong-wook; South Korea	Hiroyuki Inagaki; Japan
Individual pursuit	Kei Uchida; Japan	Hossein Askari; Iran	Alireza Haghi; Iran
Points race	Song Kyung-bang; South Korea	Wong Kam Po; Hong Kong	Abbas Saeidi Tanha; Iran
Scratch	Kei Uchida; Japan	Wang Guozhang; China	Wong Kam Po; Hong Kong
Madison	China; Shi Guijun; Wang Guozhang	Japan; Taiji Nishitani; Kazuhiro Mori	South Korea; Choi Dae-yong; Lee Hyun-gu
Team sprint	Japan; Keiichiro Yaguchi; Masaki Inoue; Keiichi Omori	Chinese Taipei	South Korea; Choi Jeong-wook; Jeon Yeong-gyu
Team pursuit	South Korea; Choi Dae-yong; Song Kyung-bang; Park Seon-ho; Lee Hyun-gu	Iran; Mehdi Sohrabi; Amir Zargari; Hossein Askari; Alireza Haghi	Japan; Kei Uchida; Taiji Nishitani; Yusuke Kuroki; Kazuhiro Mori

==== Women ====
Event	Gold	Silver	Bronze
Sprint	Jiang Yonghua; China	Tian Fang; China	Maya Tachikawa; Japan
500 m time trial	Jiang Yonghua; China	Tian Fang; China	Maya Tachikawa; Japan
Keirin	Maya Tachikawa; Japan	Tian Fang; China	Ahn Yeon-hee; South Korea
Individual pursuit	Li Meifang; China	Lim Hyung-joon; South Korea	Lan Hsiao-yun; Chinese Taipei
Points race	Chanpeng Nontasin; Thailand	Ni Fenghan; China	Lan Hsiao-yun; Chinese Taipei
Team sprint	China	Japan; Maya Tachikawa; Tomoko Endo	Chinese Taipei

== Medal table ==
Rank	Nation	Gold	Silver	Bronze	Total
1	Japan	8	5	5	18
2	China	7	5	2	14
3	South Korea	2	2	4	8
4	Kazakhstan	1	1	1	3
5	Thailand	1	1	0	2
6	Iran	0	3	3	6
7	Chinese Taipei	0	1	3	4
8	Hong Kong	0	1	1	2
Totals (8 entries)		19	19	19	57
