= 2006 Asian Cycling Championships =

- Venue: Kuala Lumpur, Malaysia
- Date: 9–16 September 2006
- Velodrome: Kuala Lumpur City Hall Velodrome

The 2006 Asian Cycling Championships took place at the Kuala Lumpur City Hall Velodrome, Cheras, Kuala Lumpur, Malaysia from 9 to 16 September 2006.

== Medal summary ==
=== Road ===
==== Men ====
Event	Gold	Silver	Bronze
Individual road race	Mehdi Sohrabi; Iran	Shinichi Fukushima; Japan	Omar Hasanin; Syria
Individual time trial	Andrey Mizurov; Kazakhstan	Ghader Mizbani; Iran	Makoto Iijima; Japan
Team time trial	South Korea; Kim Dong-hun; Lee Won-jae; Park Sung-baek; Youm Jung-hwan	Iran; Hossein Askari; Ghader Mizbani; Alireza Haghi; Abbas Saeidi Tanha	Japan; Yoshiyuki Abe; Satoshi Hirose; Makoto Iijima; Masahiko Mifune

==== Women ====
Event	Gold	Silver	Bronze
Individual road race	Han Song-hee; South Korea	Liu Yongli; China	Lee Min-hye; South Korea
Individual time trial	Wang Li; China	Lee Min-hye; South Korea	Satomi Wadami; Japan

=== Track ===
==== Men ====
Event	Gold	Silver	Bronze
Sprint	Tsubasa Kitatsuru; Japan	Zhang Lei; China	Kazuya Narita; Japan
1 km time trial	Kang Dong-jin; South Korea	Yusho Oikawa; Japan	Wu Dan; China
Keirin	Mohd Rizal Tisin; Malaysia	Hiroyuki Inagaki; Japan	Wong Kin Chung; Hong Kong
Individual pursuit	Jang Sun-jae; South Korea	Hwang In-hyeok; South Korea	Kei Uchida; Japan
Points race	Makoto Iijima; Japan	Hossein Askari; Iran	Cheung King Wai; Hong Kong
Scratch	You Tae-bok; South Korea	Sayuti Zahit; Malaysia	Wong Kam Po; Hong Kong
Madison	South Korea; Youm Jung-hwan; Park Sung-baek	Hong Kong; Cheung King Wai; Wong Kam Po	Iran; Mehdi Sohrabi; Amir Zargari
Team sprint	China; Zhang Lei; Wu Dan; Lin Feng	Japan; Kazuya Narita; Tsubasa Kitatsuru; Yudai Nitta	Malaysia; Mohd Rizal Tisin; Mohd Hafiz Sufian; Junaidi Nasir
Team pursuit	South Korea; Jang Sun-jae; Park Sung-baek; Youm Jung-hwan; Kim Dong-hun	Iran; Ghader Mizbani; Alireza Haghi; Abbas Saeidi Tanha; Amir Zargari	Chinese Taipei; Liu Chin-feng; Lee Wei-cheng; Lin Heng-hui; Chen Chien-ting

==== Women ====
Event	Gold	Silver	Bronze
Sprint	Gong Jinjie; China	Li Na; China	You Jin-a; South Korea
500 m time trial	Gong Jinjie; China	Hsiao Mei-yu; Chinese Taipei	You Jin-a; South Korea
Keirin	You Jin-a; South Korea	Li Na; China	Hsiao Mei-yu; Chinese Taipei
Individual pursuit	Lee Min-hye; South Korea	Wang Li; China	Liu Yongli; China
Points race	Li Yan; China	Wang Jianling; China	Jamie Wong; Hong Kong
Team sprint	China; Gong Jinjie; Wang Jianling	South Korea; Lee Min-hye; You Jin-a	Chinese Taipei; I Fang-ju; Tseng Hsiao-chia

== Medal table ==
Rank	Nation	Gold	Silver	Bronze	Total
1	South Korea	9	3	3	15
2	China	6	6	2	14
3	Japan	2	4	5	11
4	Iran	1	4	1	6
5	Malaysia	1	1	1	3
6	Kazakhstan	1	0	0	1
7	Hong Kong	0	1	4	5
8	Chinese Taipei	0	1	3	4
9	Syria	0	0	1	1
Totals (9 entries)		20	20	20	60
