= 2008 Tour of Azerbaijan (Iran) =

Tour of Azerbaijan 2008 was the 23rd running of the Tour of Iran (Azerbaijan), which took place between 22 May and 29 May 2008 in Iranian Azerbaijan. The tour had 7 stages, in which Hossein Askari from Iran won the first place in over all of the tour.

== Stages of the tour ==
Stage	Date	start	finish	length	winner	country
Proluge	22 May	Tabriz	Tabriz		Ghader Mizbani	IRN
1	23 May	Tabriz	Meshginshahr	180 km	Mehdi Sohrabi	IRN
2	24 May	Sarab	Tabriz	120 km	Ahad Kazemi	IRN
3	25 May	Tabriz	Bonab	110 km	Behnam Khalilikhosroshahi	IRN
4	26 May	Malekan	Urmia	180 km	Mehdi Sohrabi	IRN
5	27 May	Urmia	Shabestar	180 km	Mahdi Sohrabi	IRN
6	28 May	Shabestar	Jolfa	140 km	Hossein Askari	IRN
7	29 May	Jolfa	Tabriz	130 km	Hamid Shiri	IRN

== General classification ==
Rank	Rider	Country	Time
1	Hossein Askari	IRN	26h 45' 08"
2	Ghader Mizbani	IRN	
3	Ahad Kazemi Sarai	IRN	
