= Iranian National Time Trial Championships =

National road cycling championship in Iran

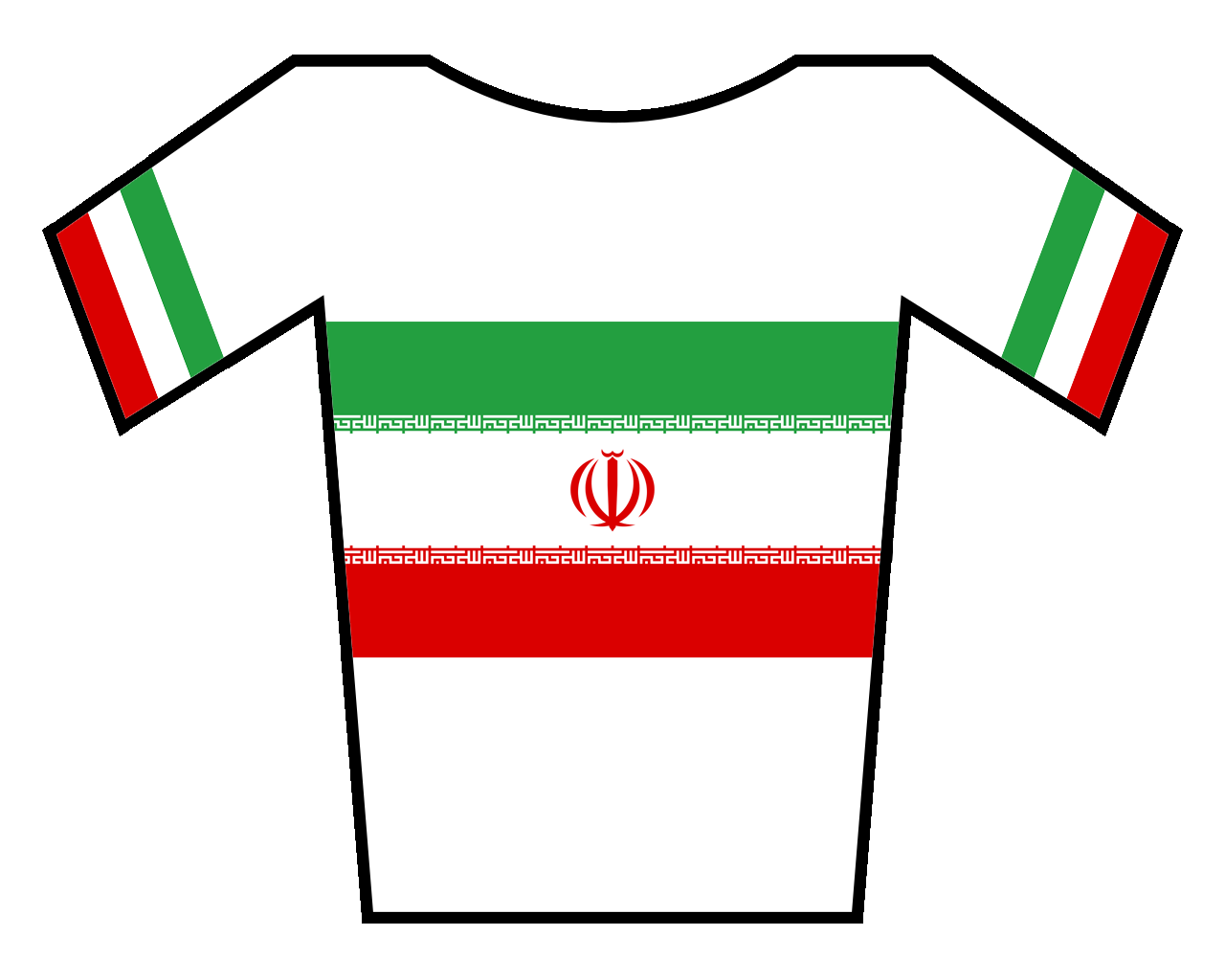
The champion's jersey

The Iranian National Time Trial Championships are held annually to decide the Iranian cycling champions in the road race discipline, across various categories.

== Men ==
=== Elite ===
Year	Gold	Silver	Bronze
1999	Omid Seraji	Masoud Hajjeh	Vahid Falahi
2001	Ghader Mizbani	Ahad Kazemi	Mohammed Mehdi
2005	Mehdi Sohrabi	Amir Zargari	Alireza Haghi
2006	Ghader Mizbani	Hossein Askari	Alireza Haghi
2007	Hossein Askari	Ghader Mizbani	Abbas Saeidi Tanha
2008	Pas de compétition		
2009	Mehdi Sohrabi	Amir Zargari	Janati Hamed
2010	Hossein Askari	Alireza Haghi	Hossein Jahanbanian
2011	Hossein Askari	Mehdi Sohrabi	Ali Torabi
2012	Alireza Haghi	Behnam Khosroshahi	Abbas Saeidi Tanha
2013	Behnam Khosroshahi	Amir Zargari	Alireza Haghi
2014	Alireza Haghi	Behnam Khosroshahi	Amir Zargari
2015	Hossein Askari	Alireza Haghi	Arvin Moazzami
2016	Arvin Moazzami	Samad Pourseyedi	Behnam Ariyan
2017	Samad Pourseyedi	Behnam Ariyan	Mohammad Rajabloo
2018	Samad Pourseyedi	Reza Hosseini	Behnam Ariyan
2019	Saeid Safarzadeh	Behnam Ariyan	Mohammad Rajabloo
2020	No race		
2021	Behnam Ariyan	Morteza Rezvani	Saeid Safarzadeh
2022	Hossein Askari	Behnam Ariyan	Amir Hossein Jamshidian
2023	Saeid Safarzadeh	Hossein Askari	Behnam Ariyan
2024	Saeid Safarzadeh	Behnam Ariyan	Hossein Askari
2025	Saeid Safarzadeh	Behnam Ariyan	Aidin Aliyari

== See also ==
- Iranian National Road Race Championships
- National Road Cycling Championships
