= Shawn Milne =

American cyclist (born 1981)

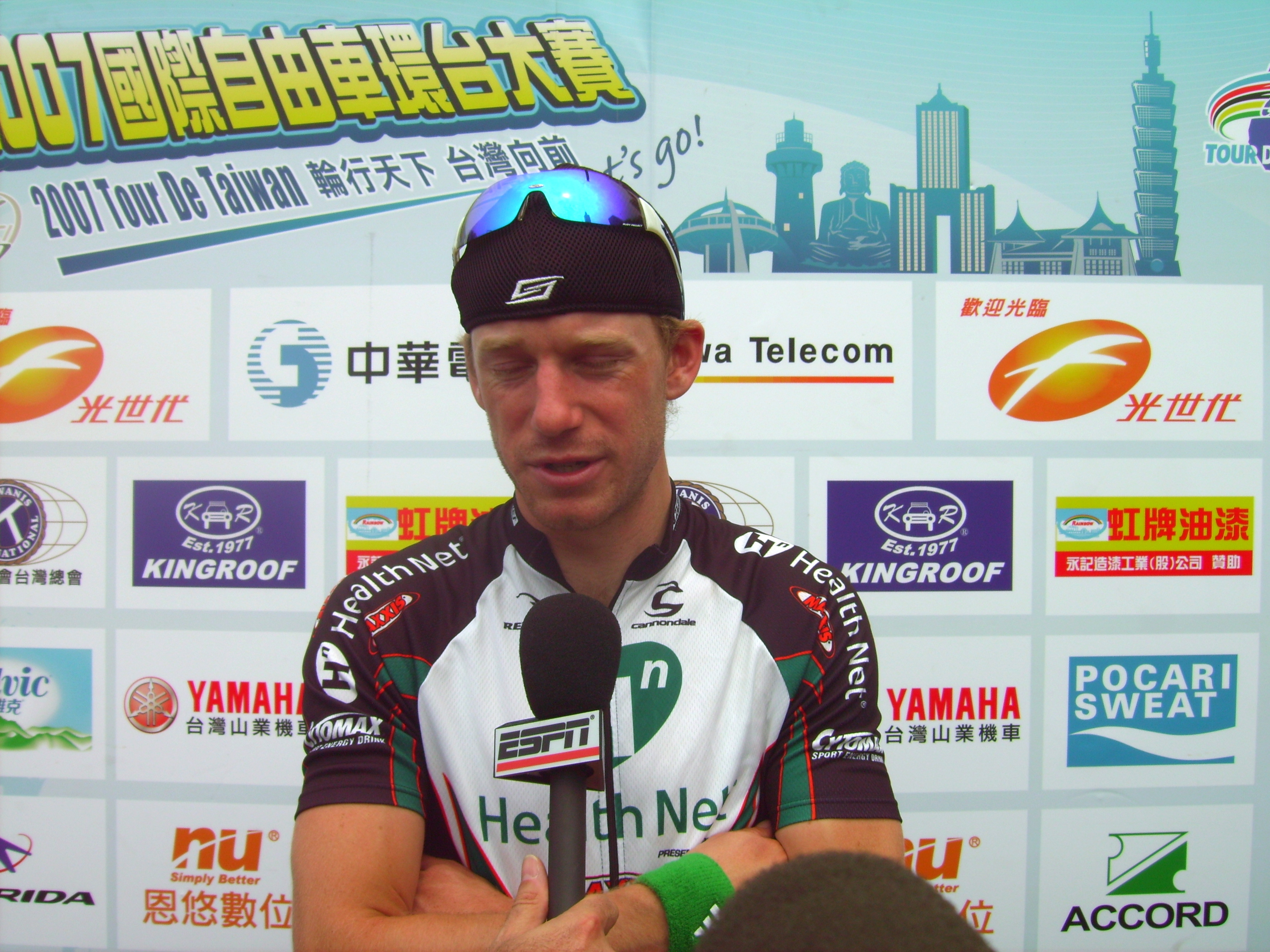

Personal information
- Full name: Shawn Milne
- Born: November 9, 1981 (age 44) United States

Cycling career
- Sport: Cycling
- Current team: 5-Hour Energy
- Discipline: Road
- Role: Rider

Amateur team
- 2004–2005: Fiordifrutta

Professional teams
- 2005–2006: Navigators Insurance
- 2007: Health Net–Maxxis
- 2008–2010: Team Type 1
- 2011–: Kenda–5-hour Energy

Shawn Milne (born November 9, 1981) is a professional road bicycle racer from Gloucester, Massachusetts, United States. In 2009, he rode in events on the USA Cycling National Racing Calendar and UCI Continental Circuits for Team Type 1. On May 31, 2009, he won the Air Force Cycling Classic. He was selected to represent the United States at the 2002 and 2003 Under 23 World Road Race Championships.

Milne was a member of the 2000 Gloucester High School (Massachusetts) national champion and national record-setting indoor track distance medley relay team along with Josh Palazola, Tristan Colangelo and Ngai Otieno.

== Major results ==
2001
1st, KOM Classification – Fitchburg-Longsjo Classic
1st, Naugatuck Criterium (USA)
3rd, Palmer Road Race (USA)
3rd, Cloudsplitter Classic Criterium (USA)
2002
3rd, Four Bridges of Elgin (USA)
2003 – U.S. National Team
2004 – Fiordifrutta
1st, Stage 6 – Volta Ciclista Internacional a Lleida (ESP)
2005 – Fiordifrutta
1st, Stage 3 – Nature Valley Grand Prix Stage Race (USA)
2006 – Navigators Insurance
1st, Univest Grand Prix (USA) UCI 1.2
1st, Overall GC – Fitchburg Longsjo Classic (USA)
1st, Stages 2 and 3 – Fitchburg Longsjo Classic (USA)
1st, Presbyterian Hospital Invitational Criterium
2007 – Health Net–Maxxis
1st, Stage 1, Tour de Taiwan (UCI Asia Tour/UCI 2.2)
1st, Overall GC – Tour de Taiwan (UCI Asia Tour/UCI 2.2)
2008 – Team Type 1
2009
1st Crystal Cup
2012 – Kenda–5-hour Energy
Massachusetts State Criterium Champion
