= 2005 Tour of Azerbaijan (Iran) =

Tour of Azerbaijan 2005 was the 20th running of the Tour of Iran (Azerbaijan), which took place between 22 May and 29 2005 in Iranian Azerbaijan. The tour had seven stages, in which Ghader Mizbani from Iran won the first place in over all of the tour.

== Stages of the Tour ==
Stage	Date	start	finish	length	winner	country
Proluge	22 May				Hossein Askari	IRN
1	23 May				Omar Hasanin	SYR
2	24 May				Ghader Mizbani	IRN
3	25 May				David McCann	Ireland
4	26 May				Abbas Saedi Tanha	IRN
5	27 May				Paul Griffin	Ireland
6	28 May				Mehdi Sohrabi	IRN
7	29 May				Mostafa Seyed Rezaei Khormizi	IRN

== General classification ==
Rank	Rider	Country
1	Ghader Mizbani	IRN
2	Ahmad Kazemi Sarai	IRN
3	Omar Hasanin	SYR
