= Ivan Tsissaruk =

Kazakhstani cyclist (born 1992)

Personal information
- Born: 2 February 1992 (age 34)

Cycling career
- Sport: Cycling
- Discipline: Track
- Role: Rider

Ivan Tsissaruk (born 2 February 1992) is a Kazakhstani road track cyclist. He competed in the team pursuit event at the 2012 and 2013 UCI Track Cycling World Championships.

== Major results ==
2012
1st Overall Tour of East Java
