= Ghader Mizbani =

Iranian racing cyclist (born 1975)

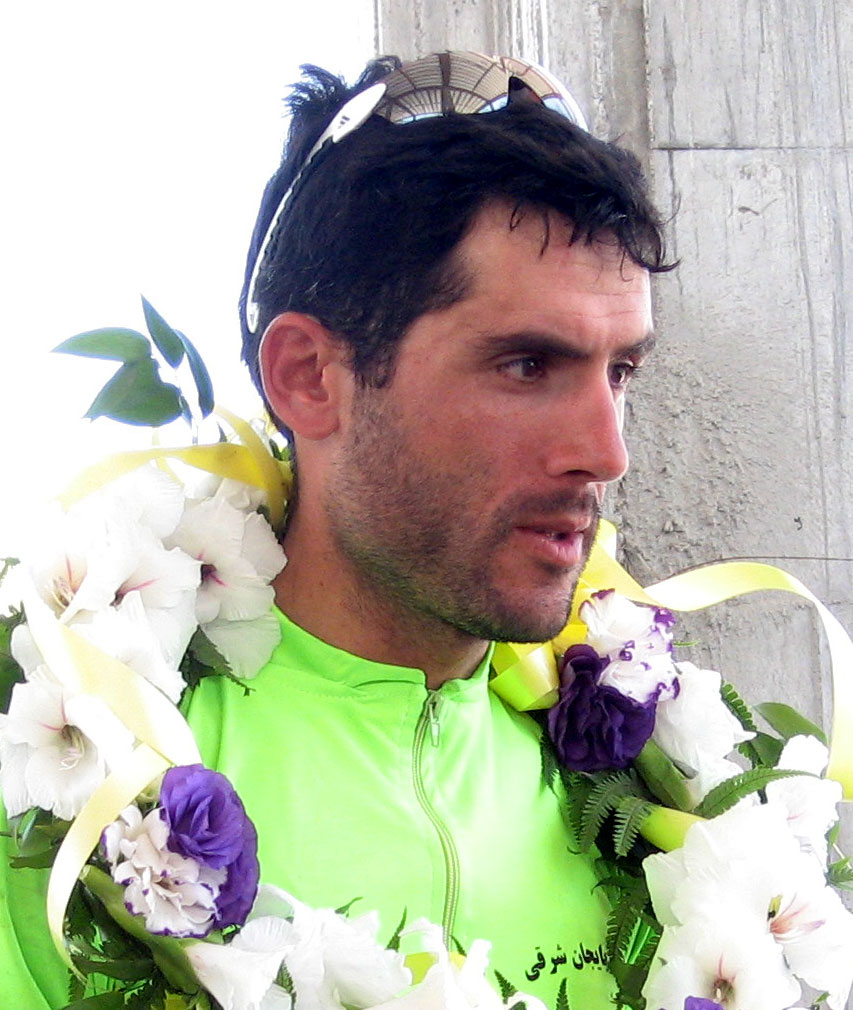

Personal information
- Full name: Ghader Mizbani Iranagh
- Born: September 6, 1975 (age 51) Tabriz, Imperial State of Iran

Cycling career
- Sport: Cycling
- Discipline: Road
- Role: Rider

Professional teams
- 2001–2003: Telekom Malaysia Cycling Team
- 2003–2006: Giant Asia Racing Team
- 2006–2008: Brisaspor
- 2008–2015: Tabriz Petrochemical Team
- 2016–2018: Tabriz Shahrdari Team

Major wins
- Stage races Presidential Cycling Tour of Turkey (2002, 2006) One-day races and Classics National Road Race Championships (2001, 2007, 2013) National Time Trial Championships (2001, 2006)
Medal record
Representing Iran
Men's road bicycle racing
Asian Games
Gold medal – first place	1998 Bangkok	Individual time trial
Silver medal – second place	2006 Doha	Team time trial
Asian Championships
Silver medal – second place	2006 Kuala Lumpur	Individual time trial
Silver medal – second place	2006 Kuala Lumpur	Team time trial
Bronze medal – third place	2004 Yokkaichi	Individual time trial
Men's track cycling
Asian Championships
Silver medal – second place	2006 Kuala Lumpur	Team pursuit

Ghader Mizbani Iranagh (Persian: قادر میزبانی ایرانق, born 6 September 1975) is an Iranian former professional road bicycle racer, who rode professionally between 2001 and 2018 for the Telekom Malaysia Cycling Team, the Giant Asia Racing Team, Brisaspor, the Tabriz Petrochemical Team and the Tabriz Shahrdary Team. Mizbani won the overall standings of the UCI Asia Tour twice – in 2005–06 and 2008–09. Mizbani won the Iranian National Road Race Championships three times and the Iranian National Time Trial Championships twice.

== Major results ==
1996
2nd Overall Tour of Mevlana
1998
1st Time trial, Asian Games
1999
3rd Overall Tour of Azerbaijan

1st Stages 1, 3 & 8

4th Time trial, Asian Road Championships
8th Overall Tour of Saudi Arabia
2000
1st Overall Tour of Azerbaijan
2001
National Road Championships

1st Road race
1st Time trial

1st Overall Tour of Saudi Arabia

1st Stages 1 & 3 (ITT)

2nd Overall Presidential Cycling Tour of Turkey

1st Stages 3 & 5

5th Time trial, Asian Road Championships
2002
1st Overall Tour of Saudi Arabia

1st Stage 4

1st Overall Presidential Cycling Tour of Turkey

1st Stage 3

1st Overall Tour of Azerbaijan

1st Stages 1 & 6

4th Overall Tour de Korea
5th Time trial, Asian Road Championships
7th Overall Tour de Serbie

1st Stage 4

2003
1st Overall Tour de Taiwan

1st Stage 7

2nd Overall Tour of Qinghai Lake
2nd Overall Presidential Cycling Tour of Turkey

1st Stage 6

4th Overall The Paths of King Nikola
6th Overall Tour of Azerbaijan
8th Overall Tour de Korea
2004
1st Stage 4 Tour de Indonesia
2nd Overall Tour of Qinghai Lake
3rd Time trial, Asian Road Championships
9th Overall Tour of Japan
2005
1st Overall Azerbaïjan Tour

1st Stage 2

2nd Overall Tour de Taiwan
4th Overall Tour de East Java

1st Stage 4

5th Overall Kerman Tour

1st Stage 2 (TTT)

8th Overall Tour of Qinghai Lake

1st Mountains classification
1st Stage 5

8th Overall Tour de Indonesia
2006
1st Overall 2005–06 UCI Asia Tour
National Road Championships

1st Time trial
2nd Road race

1st Overall Milad De Nour Tour

1st Stages 2 & 5 (TTT)

1st Overall Kerman Tour

1st Stage 1

1st Overall Presidential Cycling Tour of Turkey

1st Stage 2

1st Overall Azerbaïjan Tour

1st Stage 5 (TTT)

1st Overall Tour de East Java

1st Mountains classification
1st Stage 4

Asian Games

2nd Team time trial
5th Time trial

Asian Road Championships

2nd Time trial
2nd Team time trial
5th Road race

2nd Team pursuit, Asian Track Championships
7th Overall Tour of Qinghai Lake
2007
National Road Championships

1st Road race
2nd Time trial

1st Overall Milad De Nour Tour

1st Stage 5 (ITT)

1st Stage 4 Tour de Taiwan
2nd Overall Kerman Tour

1st Prologue

2nd Overall Azerbaïjan Tour

1st Stage 4

5th Overall Tour of Siam

1st Stage 4

5th Overall Presidential Cycling Tour of Turkey
6th Overall Tour de Langkawi
9th Overall Tour de East Java
2008
1st Overall Tour de Indonesia

1st Stages 5 & 10

1st Overall Tour de East Java

1st Stage 4

1st Overall Kerman Tour

1st Stage 2 (TTT)

2nd Overall Azerbaïjan Tour

1st Prologue, Stages 2 (TTT) & 3

2nd Overall Jelajah Malaysia
4th Overall President Tour of Iran

1st Stage 5

7th Overall Tour of Qinghai Lake
2009
1st Overall Tour de Singkarak

1st Stage 3a

1st Overall President Tour of Iran

1st Stage 3

2nd Overall Tour of Qinghai Lake

1st Stages 3 & 8

2nd Overall Tour de Indonesia

1st Stages 1 (TTT) & 4

2nd Overall Tour de East Java
3rd Overall Jelajah Malaysia
3rd Overall Azerbaïjan Tour

1st Stage 5

6th Overall Circuito Montañés
2010
1st Overall Azerbaïjan Tour

1st Stages 1, 5 & 6

1st Overall Tour de Singkarak

1st Stages 1 (TTT) & 3

3rd Time trial, National Road Championships
7th Road race, Asian Road Championships
7th Overall Tour of Qinghai Lake

1st Stage 3

9th Overall Tour de Langkawi
9th Overall Presidential Tour of Iran
2011
1st Overall Milad De Nour Tour

1st Stage 1

3rd Overall Azerbaïjan Tour

1st Stage 3 (TTT)

3rd Overall International Presidency Tour of Iran
5th Overall Tour de Korea
10th Overall Tour de Langkawi
2012
7th Overall Tour de Langkawi
2013
1st Road race, National Road Championships
1st Overall Tour de Filipinas

1st Points classification
1st Stage 4

1st Overall Tour of Iran

1st Mountains classification
1st Stage 5

1st Overall Tour de Singkarak
1st Overall Tour of Borneo

1st Mountains classification
1st Asian rider classification
1st Stage 4

6th Overall Tour of Qinghai Lake
7th Overall Tour de Ijen
2014
1st Overall Tour of Iran

1st Stage 5

1st Overall Tour de East Java

1st Mountains classification
1st Stage 2

1st Mountains classification Tour of Qinghai Lake
3rd Overall Tour of Japan

1st Stage 5

3rd Overall Tour of Fuzhou
7th Overall Tour de Ijen
2015
4th Overall Tour of Iran
8th Overall Tour de Singkarak
9th Overall Tour of Japan
2016
6th Overall Tour of Iran

1st Stage 5

6th Overall Tour of Japan
7th Road race, Asian Road Championships
9th Overall Tour of Qinghai Lake
10th Overall Tour of Fuzhou
