= 2009 Tour of Azerbaijan (Iran) =

Tour of Azerbaijan 2009 is the 24th round of Tour of Iran (Azerbaijan), which took between 15 May and 21 May 2009 in Iranian Azerbaijan and in the Autonomous Republic of Nakhichivan. The tour had 6 stages in which Ahad Kazemi from Iran won in first place in over all classification of the tour.

== Stages of the tour ==
Stage	Date	start	finish	length	winner	country
1	15 May	Tabriz	Meshginshahr	146 km	Rasoul Barati	IRN
2	16 May	Urmia	Shabestar	175 km	Ahad Kazemi	IRN
3	17 May	Tabriz	Jolfa	129 km	Hossein Nateghi	IRN
4	18 May	Nakhichivan	Nakhichivan		Mehdi Sohrabi	IRN
5	20 May	Jolfa	Kaleybar	145 km	Ghader Mizbani	IRN
6	21 May	Kaleybar	Tabriz	173 km	Ramin Mehrabani	IRN

== General classification ==
Rank	Rider	Country	Time
1	Ahad Kazemi	IRN	21h 09' 13"
2	Hossein Askari	IRN	+20'
3	Ghader Mizbani	IRN	+56'
