= 2011 Tour of Azerbaijan (Iran) =

Tour of Azerbaijan 2011 is the 26th round of Tour of Iran (Azerbaijan), which took between 13 May and 18 May 2011 in Iranian Azerbaijan. The tour had 6 stages in which Mehdi Sohrabi from Iran won in first place in over all classification of the tour.

== Stages of the tour ==
Stage	Date	start	finish	length	winner	country
Prologue	13 May	Tabriz	Tabriz	4 km	Stefan Schumacher	GER
1	14 May	Tabriz	Meshginshahr	177 km	Aleksej Lyalko	KAZ
2	15 May	Ardabil	Ardabil	50 km	Mahdi Sohrabi	IRN
3	16 May	Sarab	Tabriz	120	Markus Eichler	GER
4	17 May	Shabestar	Urmia	185 km	Miguel Ángel Niño	COL
5	18 May	Urmia	Tabriz	125 km	Stefan Schumacher	GER

== Overall classification ==
Rank	Rider	Country	Time
1	Mehdi Sohrabi	IRN	14h 17' 40"
2	Hossein Askari	IRN	+24
3	Ghader Mizbani	IRN	+25
