= 2010 Tour of Azerbaijan (Iran) =

Tour of Azerbaijan 2010 was the 25th running of the Tour of Iran (Azerbaijan), which took place between 3 May 3 and 8 May 2010 in Iranian Azerbaijan and in the Autonomous Republic of Nakhichivan. The tour had 6 stages in which Ghader Mizbani from Iran won the first place in overall classification of the tour.

== Stages of the tour ==
Stage	Date	start	finish	length	winner	country
1	3 May	Tabriz	Urmia	146 km	Ghader Mizbani	IRN
2	4 May	Urmia	Shabestar	175.4 km	Ahad Zargari	IRN
3	5 May	Tabriz	Jolfa	129.6 km	Andrey Mizurov	Kazakhstan
4	6 May	Nakhichivan	Nakhichivan	79	Rafael Serrano	Spain
5	7 May	Jolfa	Kaleybar	145 km	Ghader Mizbani	IRN
6	8 May	Kaleybar	Tabriz	164.5 km	Ghader Mizbani	IRN

== General classification ==
Rank	Rider	Country	Time
1	Ghader Mizbani	IRN	21h 22' 25"
2	Amir Zargari	IRN	+6' 13"
3	Hossein Askari	IRN	+8' 44"
