= Mohammad Reza Bajoul =

Iranian cyclist

Personal information
- Born: 21 March 1960 (age 66)

Cycling career
- Sport: Cycling

Mohammad Reza Bajoul (Persian: محمدرضا باجول, born 21 March 1960) is an Iranian former cyclist. He competed in the road race and did not finish at the 1988 Summer Olympics.
