= 2006 Tour of Azerbaijan (Iran) =

Tour of Azerbaijan 2006 was the 21st running of the Tour of Iran (Azerbaijan), which took place between 22 May and 29 May 2006 in Iranian Azerbaijan. The tour had 7 stages, in which Ghader Mizbani from Iran won the first place in over all of the tour.

== Stages of the tour ==
Stage	Date	start	finish	length	winner	country
Proluge	22 May	Tabriz	Tabriz	40 km	Ahad Kazemi Sarai	IRN
1	23 May	Tabriz	Kaleibar	199 km	Omar Hasanin	SYR
2	24 May	Kaleybar	Ardabil	215 km	Hossein Askari	IRN
3	25 May	Sarab	Miyaneh	180 km	Ebrahim Javani	IRN
4	26 May	Miyaneh	Maragheh	180 km	Omar Hasanein	SYR
	27 May			50 km	Ghader Mizbani	IRN
5	28 May	Malekan	Urmia	157 km	Omar Hasanein	SYR
6	29 May	Urmia	Sharafkhaneh	165 km	Amir Zagari	IRN
7	30 May	Shabestar	Tabriz	70 km	Alireza Zeynali	IRN

== General classification ==
Rank	Rider	Country
1	Ghader Mizbani	IRN
2	Ahmad Kazemi Sarai	IRN
3	Omar Hasanin	SYR
