= Björn Glasner =

German cyclist

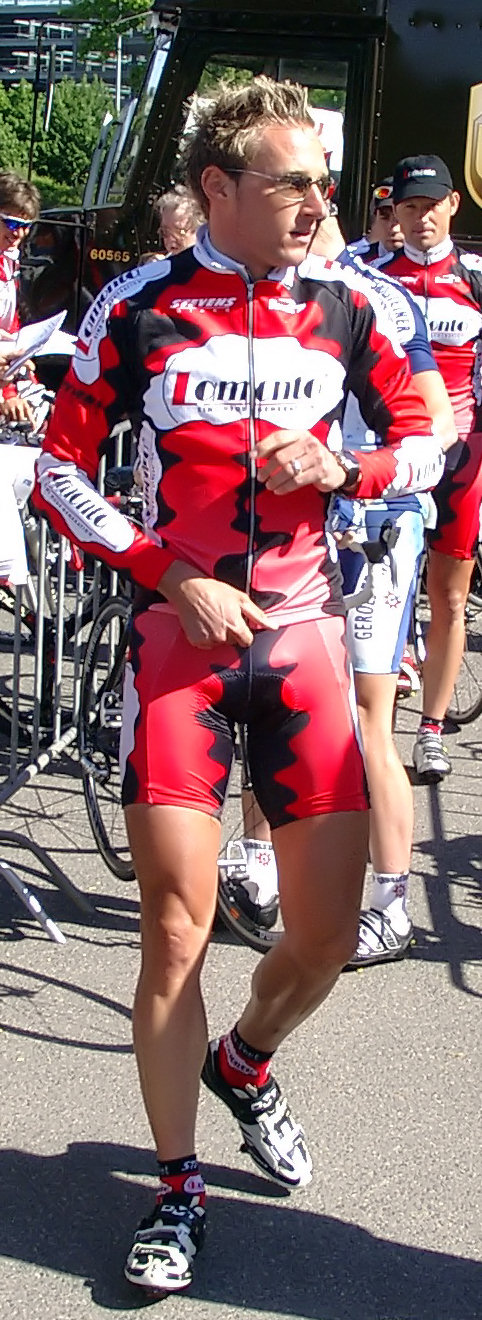

Personal information
- Full name: Björn Glasner
- Born: 5 May 1973 (age 53) Bad Neuenahr-Ahrweiler, Germany

Cycling career
- Sport: Cycling
- Current team: Retired
- Discipline: Road
- Role: Rider

Professional teams
- 1996–1997: Continentale Dortmund
- 1998: Gerolsteiner
- 1999: Continentale Dortmund
- 2000–2002: Team Cologne
- 2003–2006: Team Lamonta
- 2007–2010: Regiostrom–Senges

Björn Glasner (born 5 May 1973) is a German former professional cyclist.

== Major results ==
2000
1st Stage 4 Bayern-Rundfahrt
2002
1st Stage 2 Giro del Capo
2004
1st Overall Rheinland-Pfalz Rundfahrt
2007
1st Overall Tour de East Java

1st Stages 2 & 3

1st Stage 4 Rheinland-Pfalz Rundfahrt
2008
1st Stage 5 Tour of Thailand
