= RTS–Monton Racing Team =

Taiwanese cycling team

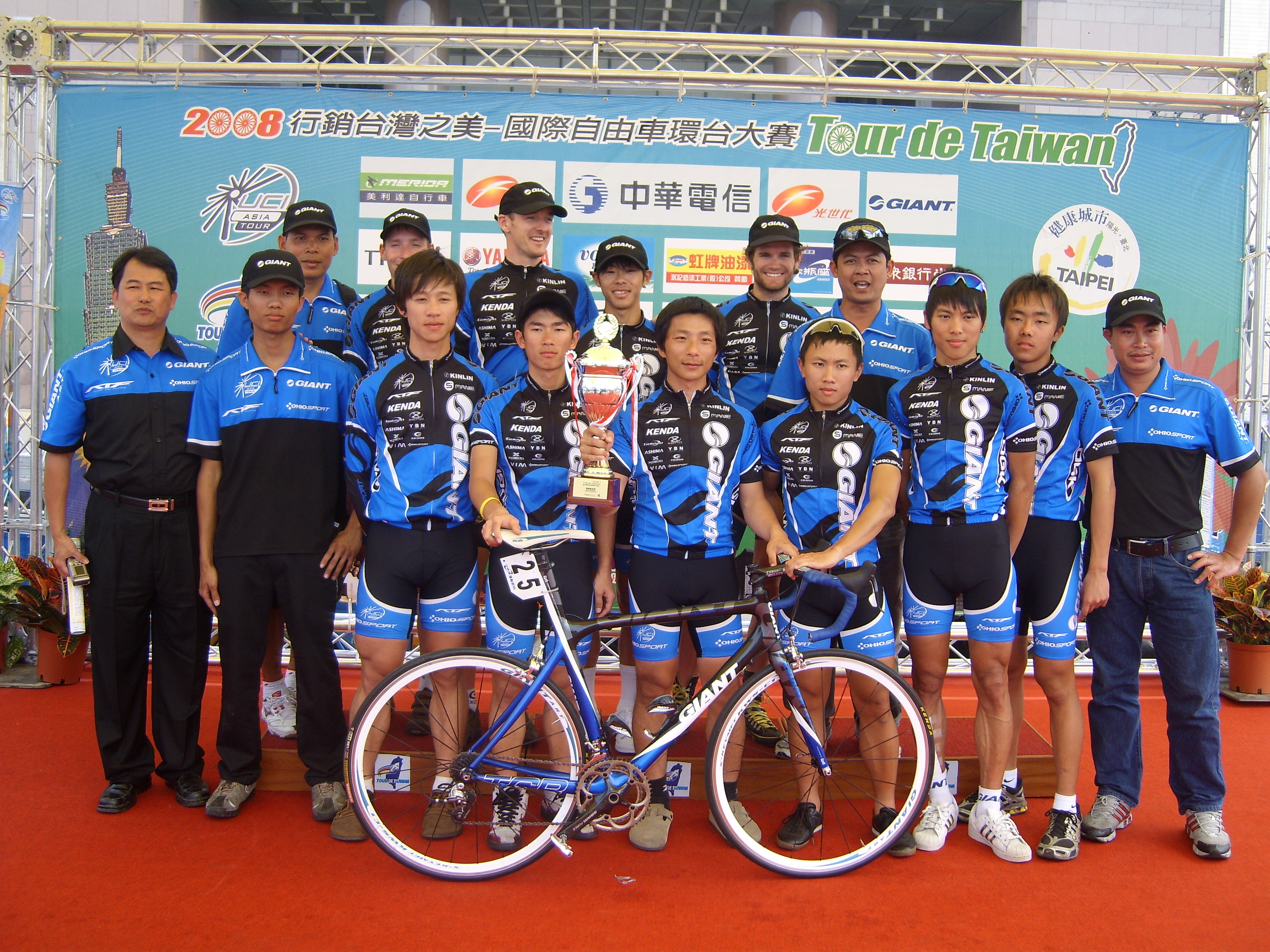

Team information
- UCI code: RTS
- Registered: Republic of China (Taiwan)
- Founded: 2002
- Discipline: Road
- Status: UCI Continental

Key personnel
- General manager: Wen Chin Lin

Team name history
- 2002–2010 2011 2012–2013 2014–2016 2017 2018: Giant Asia Racing Team; Giant Kenda Cycling Team; RTS Racing Team; RTS–Santic Racing Team; RTS–Monton Racing Team; RTS Racing Team

RTS Racing Team (UCI team code: RTS) is a Taiwanese UCI Continental cycling team managed by Wen Chin Lin and sponsored by Giant Bicycles, Kinlin Industrial Corporation, Kenda, Kalloy, OGK Helmet, Yaban Chain, Ashima, Exustar, Smanie, Cionlli, XPEDO, VIM Group and Adidas Eyewear.

== History ==
RTS Racing Team was established by president Liu of Corporation unofficially around 1990. Lin Qing Fa was appointed coach in 1992, and was later replaced by Lin Wen Chin. Over its first decade, RTS Racing Team became Mountain biking and Road racing champions in Taiwan, and represented Taiwan in many races abroad.

In 2002, RTS Racing Team was formally established, under the name Giant Asia Racing Team, by general manager Liu Yong Chang. Lin Wen Chin was appointed as the manager of the team, and it was officially registered as a Trade Team III, the first such team registered in Asia. Together with Giant, thirteen other financial sponsors helped cover the expenditure of the cycling team.

== Team roster ==
Rider	Date of birth
Chen Chien Chou (TWN)	2 December 1997 (age 28)
Chin Chao Kai (TWN)	15 July 1993 (age 33)
Ruslan Karimov (UZB)	22 May 1986 (age 40)
Oleksiy Kasyanov (UKR)	22 February 1992 (age 34)
Muradjan Khalmuratov (UZB)	11 June 1982 (age 44)
Liu Jia Liang (TWN)	23 September 1994 (age 31)

Rider	Date of birth
Jambaljamts Sainbayar (MNG)	4 September 1996 (age 30)
Alexei Shnyrko (BLR)	12 May 1994 (age 32)
Artem Tesler (UKR)	12 October 1988 (age 37)
Tuulkhangai Tuguldur (MNG)	17 June 1985 (age 41)
Wen Hai Tao (TWN)	4 May 1997 (age 29)

== Major wins ==
2002
Overall Tour de Korea, Tang Xuezhong

Stages 2 & 4, Tang Xuezhong

Stage 5 Tour of Bulgaria, Jamsrangiin Ölzii-Orshikh
Overall Perlis Open, Jamsrangiin Ölzii-Orshikh

Stage 1, Jamsrangiin Ölzii-Orshikh
Stage 3, Paul Redenbach

Tour de Okinawa, Paul Redenbach
2003
Overall Tour de Korea, Glen Chadwick

Stage 3, Glen Chadwick

Stage 4b Tour of Queensland, Brett Aitken
2004
Ireland Time Trial Championships, David McCann
Overall Presidential Cycling Tour of Turkey, Ahad Kazemi
Stages 1 & 2 Tour de Korea, David McCann
2005
Ireland Time Trial Championships, David McCann
Overall Kerman Tour, Hossein Askari

Stage 2, Ghader Mizbani

Overall Tour de Korea, David McCann

Stage 2, David McCann

Overall Azerbaijan Tour, Ghader Mizbani

Prologue, Hossein Askari
Stage 2, Ghader Mizbani
Stage 3, David McCann
Stage 5, Paul Griffin

Overall Tour de East Java, Ahad Kazemi

Stage 1, Paul Griffin
Stage 2, Ahad Kazemi
Stage 4, Ghader Mizbani

Stage 5 Tour of Qinghai Lake, Ghader Mizbani
Overall Tour de Indonesia, Hossein Askari

Stage 1, Paul Griffin
Stage 2, David McCann
Stage 3, Hossein Askari

Overall Tour of Milad du Nour, David McCann

Stage 1, David McCann
Stage 6, Ahad Kazemi

Stage 6 Herald Sun Tour, David McCann
Overall Tour de Taiwan, Ahad Kazemi

Stage 4, Ahad Kazemi

2006
Ireland Road Race Championships, David McCann
Iran Time Trial Championships, Ghader Mizbani
Stage 7 Tour of Siam, Daniel Lloyd
Stage 1 & 4 Tour of Thailand, David McCann
Overall Kerman Tour, Ghader Mizbani

Stage 1, Ghader Mizbani
Stages 2 & 4, Hossein Askari

Overall Tour de Korea, Tobias Erler

Stage 3, Tobias Erler

Overall Azerbaijan Tour, Ghader Mizbani

Stage 2, Hossein Askari

Overall Tour de East Java, Ghader Mizbani

Stage 4, Ghader Mizbani

Stage 4 Tour of Qinghai Lake, Daniel Lloyd
Stage 5 Tour of Qinghai Lake, David McCann
Overall Tour of Milad du Nour, Ghader Mizbani

Stage 2, Ghader Mizbani
Stages 6 & 7, Hossein Askari

Overall Tour de Indonesia, David McCann
2007
Iran Road Race Championships, Ghader Mizbani
Iran Time Trial Championships, Hossein Askari
Stage 4 Jelajah Malaysia, Hossein Askari
Stage 7 Jelajah Malaysia, Lai Kuan-Hua
Overall Tour of Siam, Jai Crawford

Stage 4, Ghader Mizbani

Stage 4 Tour de Taiwan, Ghader Mizbani
Stage 1 Kerman Tour, Ghader Mizbani
Stage 3 Kerman Tour, Hossein Askari
Overall Azerbaijan Tour, Hossein Askari

Stage 2, Hossein Askari
Stages 3 & 8, Ahad Kazemi

Stage 4 Ghader Mizbani
Overall Tour of Milad du Nour, Ghader Mizbani

Stage 4, Ahad Kazemi
Stage 5, Ghader Mizbani

2008
Stage 6 Tour de Korea, David McCann
Overall Tour of Thailand, Alex Coutts

Stage 2, Stefan Löffler

2010
Ireland Time Trial Championships, David McCann
Kyrgyzstan Road Race Championships, Eugen Wacker
Kyrgyzstan Time Trial Championships, Eugen Wacker
Overall Tour de Taiwan, David McCann

Stage 1, David McCann

Stage 1 Tour of Thailand, David McCann
Overall Tour de Filipinas, David McCann

Stages 1 & 4, David McCann

Overall Melaka Governor's Cup, David McCann

Stage 1, David McCann

Overall Jelajah Malaysia, David McCann
Stages 4 & 6 Tour of China, Rico Rogers
2011
Stage 7 Tour de Taiwan, Rico Rogers
2012
Stage 2 Jelajah Malaysia, Jai Crawford
2013
Uzbekistan Road Race Championships, Muradjan Khalmuratov
Uzbekistan Time Trial Championships, Muradjan Khalmuratov
Stage 4 Tour de Ijen, Rahim Emami
Overall Tour of Fuzhou, Rahim Emami

Stage 1, Boris Shpilevsky
Stage 2, Rahim Emami

Sea Games Myanmar Road Race, Alex Ariya Destribois-Coudroy
2014
Uzbekistan Road Race Championships, Ruslan Karimov
Stage 7 Tour of China I, Boris Shpilevsky
Overall Tour of China II, Boris Shpilevsky

Stages 2 & 5, Boris Shpilevsky

Stages 5 & 9 Tour of Taihu Lake, Boris Shpilevsky
Stage 1 Tour of Fuzhou, Boris Shpilevsky
2015
Stage 5 Tour de Taiwan, Tino Thömel
Stage 8 Tour de Korea, Tino Thömel
South Korea Road Race Championships, Park Sang-hong
Stage 7 Tour of Hainan, Tino Thömel
Stage 2 Tour of Yancheng Coastal Wetlands, Tino Thömel
2018
Uzbekistan Road Race Championships, Muradjan Khalmuratov
