= Omar Hasanin =

Syrian cyclist

Personal information
- Born: 15 November 1978 (age 47) Damascus, Syria

Cycling career
- Sport: Cycling
- Discipline: Road
- Role: Rider

Professional team
- 2008–2009: Doha Team

Omar Hasanin (Arabic: عمر حسنين; born 15 November 1978) is a Syrian road bicycle racer. He competed at the 2012 Summer Olympics in the Men's road race, but failed to finish.

== Major results ==
2000
1st National Road Race Championships
1st National Time Trial Championships
2005
2nd Asian Road Race Championships
2nd Overall Milad De Nour Tour

1st Stage 2

3rd Overall Tour of Iran (Azerbaijan)

1st Stage 1

2006
1st Stages 1, 4 & 6 Tour of Iran (Azerbaijan)
2nd Arab Road Race Championships
3rd Asian Road Race Championships
2007
2nd Overall Tour of Libya
2008
1st Overall Tour of Libya
1st Stage 1 Tour de East Java
3rd International Grand Prix Al-Khor
3rd International Grand Prix Messaeed
3rd Arab Time Trial Championships
2009
2nd Arab Road Race Championships
3rd HH Vice-President's Cup
3rd Emirates Cup
2010
1st Stage 9 Tour du Maroc
1st Stage 3 Tour of Victory
2nd Arab Road Race Championships
2011
2nd Overall Tour of Marmara

1st Stage 2

2nd Golan I
2nd Arab Road Race Championships
