= Mehdi Sohrabi =

Iranian cyclist

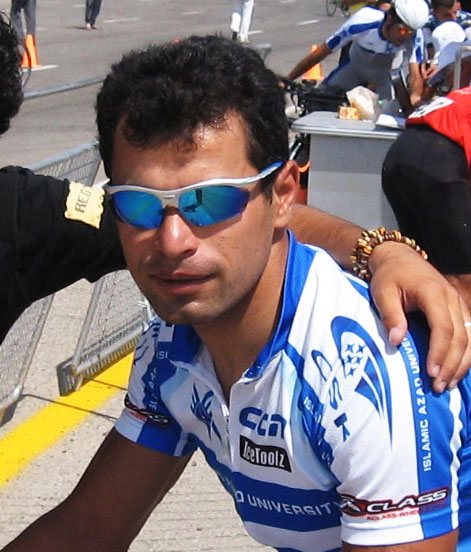
- Sohrabi at the 2008 Iranian National Road Race Championships.

Personal information
- Full name: Mehdi Sohrabi
- Born: 12 October 1981 (age 45) Zanjan, Iran
- Height: 1.70 m (5 ft 7 in)
- Weight: 69 kg (152 lb)

Cycling career
- Sport: Cycling
- Current team: Tommi's Radltankstelle Team
- Disciplines: Road; Track
- Role: Rider

Amateur team
- Nosazi Madares Zanjan

Professional teams
- 2005: Paykan
- 2007–2009: Islamic Azad University Cycling Team
- 2009–2011: Tabriz Petrochemical Team
- 2012: Lotto–Belisol
- 2013–2015: Tabriz Petrochemical Team
- 2016: Tabriz Shahrdari Team
- 2017–2018: Pishgaman Cycling Team
- 2023: Iraq Cycling Project
- 2025–: Tommi's Radltankstelle Team

Major wins
- UCI Asia Tour (2009–10, 2010–11); Asian Road Race Championships (2006, 2010); Jelajah Malaysia (2007, 2011); Tour de Indonesia (2009); Kerman Tour (2011); International Azerbaïjan Tour (2011); Melaka Chief Minister Cup (2008); Milad De Nour Tour (2009); National Road Race Championships (2005, 2010, 2016, 2017, 2026); National Time Trial Championships (2005, 2009)
Medal record
Representing Iran
Men's road bicycle racing
Asian Games
Silver medal – second place	2006 Doha	Road race
Asian Championships
Gold medal – first place	2006 Kuala Lumpur	Road race
Gold medal – first place	2010 Sharjah	Road race
Silver medal – second place	2012 Kuala Lumpur	Road race
Silver medal – second place	2018 Naypyidaw	Team time trial
Bronze medal – third place	2018 Naypyidaw	Road race
Men's track cycling
Asian Games
Silver medal – second place	2006 Doha	Team pursuit
Bronze medal – third place	2006 Doha	Madison
Bronze medal – third place	2010 Guangzhou	Points race
Asian Championships
Gold medal – first place	2009 Tenggarong	Scratch
Silver medal – second place	2003 Changwon	Points race
Silver medal – second place	2003 Changwon	Scratch
Silver medal – second place	2003 Changwon	Team pursuit
Silver medal – second place	2004 Yokkaichi	Team pursuit
Silver medal – second place	2005 Ludhiana	Team pursuit
Silver medal – second place	2007 Bangkok	Individual pursuit
Silver medal – second place	2007 Bangkok	Team pursuit
Silver medal – second place	2008 Nara	Team pursuit
Bronze medal – third place	2006 Kuala Lumpur	Madison
Bronze medal – third place	2007 Bangkok	Madison

Mehdi Sohrabi (Persian: مهدی سهرابی; born 12 October 1981) is an Iranian professional racing cyclist, who currently rides for UCI Continental team Tommi's Radltankstelle Team. He was suspended from the sport from 2019 to 2023 following an anti-doping rule violation.

== Career ==
Sohrabi was born in Zanjan, Iran. In 2010 and 2011, Sohrabi won the UCI Asia Tour. At the end of the 2011 season, Sohrabi had many UCI-points, and because of this was contracted by UCI ProTeam Lotto–Belisol, that needed these points to secure their ProTeam status for the next season. After one year as a rider for Lotto–Belisol, Sohrabi returned to his former team in 2013. After three years he moved to the Tabriz Shahrdari Team for 2016, but moved to the Pishgaman Cycling Team for 2017.

== Major results ==
2005
National Road Championships

1st Road race
1st Time trial

1st Stage 4 Kerman Tour
2006
1st Road race, Asian Road Championships
2nd Road race, Asian Games
4th Overall Kerman Tour
2007
1st Overall Jelajah Malaysia

1st Asian rider classification

Kerman Tour

1st Stages 5 & 7

1st Stage 1 Tour de East Java
1st Stage 6 Tour de Hokkaido
6th Overall Tour of Azerbaijan (Iran)
2008
2nd Overall International Presidency Tour

1st Stage 2

3rd Overall Jelajah Negeri Sembilan

1st Stages 2 & 3

6th Road race, Asian Road Championships
7th Overall Tour of Azerbaijan (Iran)

1st Stages 1, 5 & 6

2009
1st Time trial, National Road Championships
1st Overall Tour de Indonesia

1st Points classification
1st Mountains classification
1st Stages 1 (TTT) & 6

1st Overall Milad De Nour Tour

1st Stages 2 & 4

1st Stage 4 International Azerbaïjan Tour
6th Overall Presidential Cycling Tour Of Iran
6th Overall Tour de East Java

1st Points classification

8th Overall Jelajah Malaysia

1st Stage 2

2010
1st Road race, Asian Road Championships
1st Road race, National Road Championships
1st Stage 7 Tour de Singkarak
Tour of Qinghai Lake

1st Stages 6 & 9

2011
1st Overall Jelajah Malaysia

1st Asian rider classification
1st Stages 1 & 6

1st Overall Kerman Tour

1st Stages 1, 2, 3, 4 & 5

1st Overall International Azerbaïjan Tour

1st Stage 3

1st Stage 4 International Presidency Tour
1st Stage 3 Tour de Taiwan
1st Stage 7 Tour of Qinghai Lake
2nd Time trial, National Road Championships
6th Overall Milad De Nour Tour
2012
2nd Road race, Asian Road Championships
2013
Tour of Borneo

1st Stages 2 & 5

1st Stage 3 Tour de Filipinas
1st Stage 7 Tour de Singkarak
2014
1st Stage 4 Tour de Ijen
6th Road race, Asian Road Championships
2015
1st Stage 3 Tour de Singkarak
10th Road race, National Road Championships
2016
National Road Championships

1st Road race
4th Time trial

10th Overall Tour of Iran (Azerbaijan)
2017
National Road Championships

1st Road race
5th Time trial

Voided results from January 2018 to July 2019

2018
~~Asian Road Championships~~

~~2nd Team time trial~~
~~3rd Road race~~

2019
~~1st Road race, National Road Championships~~

2025
3rd Road race, National Road Championships
2026
National Road Championships

1st

Road Race
