= 2007 Tour of Azerbaijan (Iran) =

Tour of Azerbaijan 2007 was the 22nd running of the Tour of Iran (Azerbaijan), which took place between 22 May and 29 May 2007 in Iranian Azerbaijan. The tour had 7 stages, in which Hossein Askari from Iran won the first place in over all of the tour.

== Stages of the tour ==
Stage	Date	start	finish	length	winner	country
Proluge	22 May	Tabriz	Tabriz		Farshad Salehian	IRN
1	23 May	Tabriz	Meshginshahr		Hossein Askari	IRN
2	24 May	Ardabil	Sarab		Ahad Kazemi	IRN
3	25 May	Bostanabad	Maragheh		Ghader Mizbani	IRN
	26 May	Bonab	Bonab		Fadi Khan Shikhoobi	SYR
4	27 May	Malekan	Urmia		Mohammad Rajablou	IRN
5	28 May	Sharafkhaneh	Jolfa		Moezeddin Seyed Rezaei Khormizi	IRN
6	29 May	Jolfa	Marand		Ahad Kazemi	IRN
7	29 May	Marand	Tabriz		Anuar Manan	Malaysia

== General classification ==
Rank	Rider	Country
1	Hossein Askari	IRN
2	Ghader Mizbani	IRN
3	Rahim Imani	IRN
