= Hong Kong Pro Cycling =

Team information
- UCI code: HGK
- Registered: Hong Kong
- Founded: 2005
- Disbanded: 2007
- Discipline: Road
- Status: UCI Continental

Key personnel
- General manager: Man Wong

Team name history
- 2005–2006 2007: Purapharm; Hong Kong Pro Cycling

Hong Kong Pro Cycling was a UCI Continental cycling team based in Hong Kong that existed from 2005 to 2007.
