= Tour of Azerbaijan (Iran) =

Iranian multi-day road cycling race

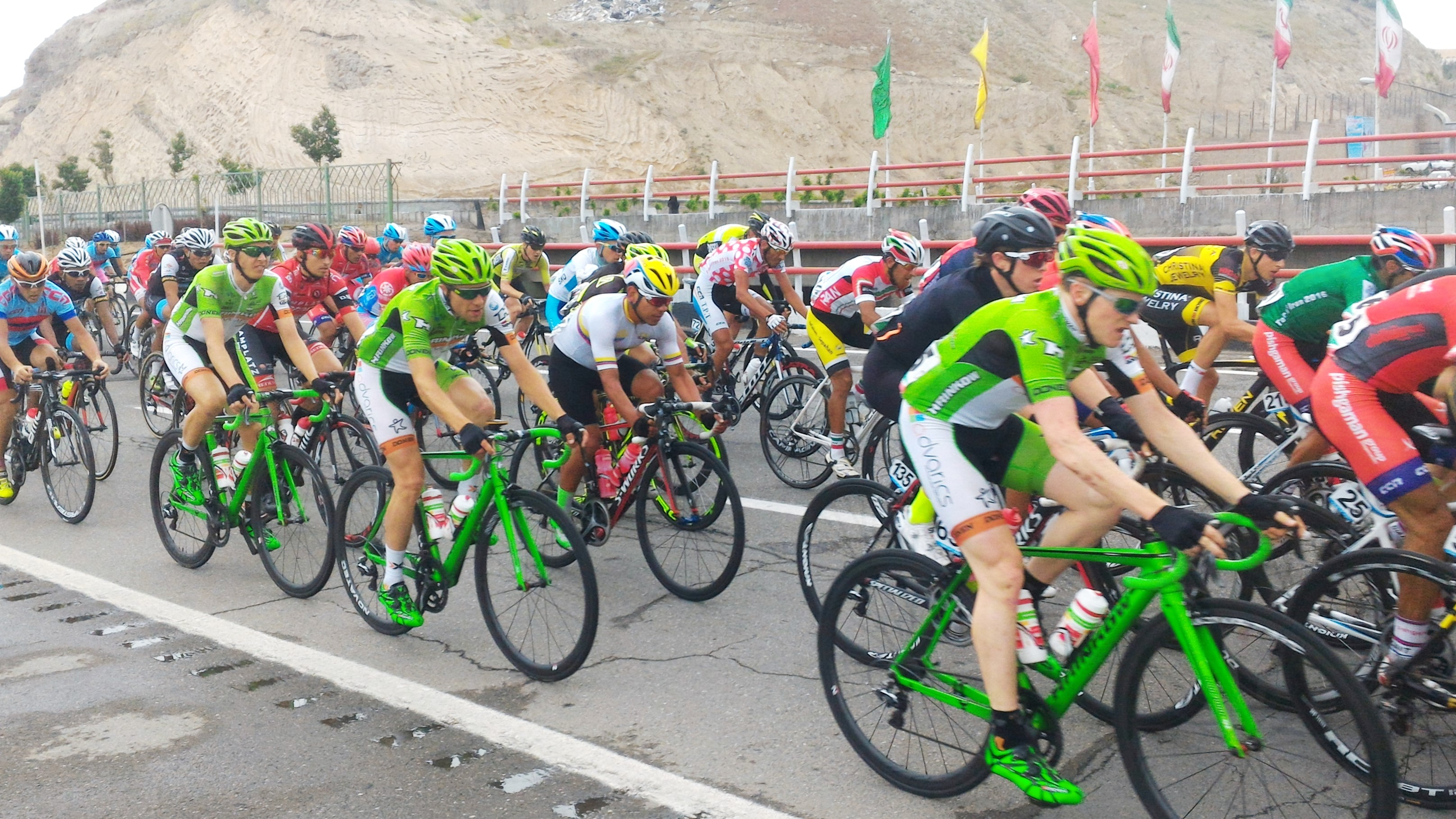

Race details
- Date: October
- Region: Iranian Azerbaijan
- English name: Tour of Azerbaijan (Iran)
- Local name: تور دوچرخه‌سواری بین‌المللی آذربایجان (in Persian)
- Discipline: Road
- Competition: UCI Asia Tour 2.1
- Type: Stage race
- Organiser: Cycling Federation of the Islamic Republic of Iran
- Web site: www.tourofiran.com

History
- First edition: 1986; 40 years ago
- Editions: 37 (as of 2025)
- First winner: Mohammad Reza Bajoul (IRI)
- Most wins: Ghader Mizbani (IRI) (7 wins)
- Most recent: Saeid Safarzadeh (IRI)

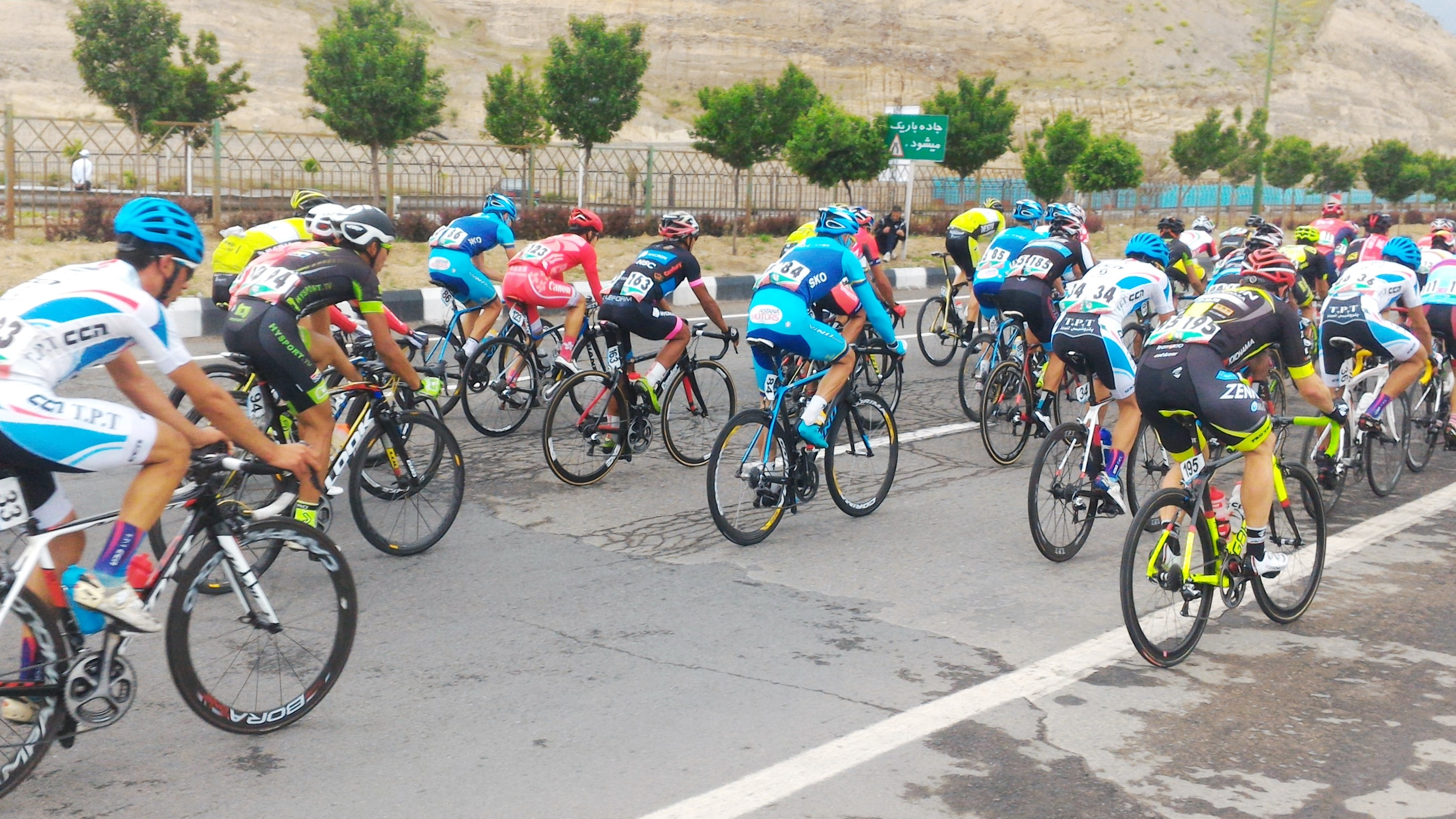

Tour of Iran (Azerbaijan) 2016, Stage 6: Northern Highway of Tabriz, Road 14 (Iran).

Tour of Azerbaijan (Iran), also known as the Tour of Iranian Azerbaijan or Azerbaijan Tour, is an annual multiple stage road bicycle racing held in Iran since 1986, named after Iranian Azerbaijan. It is a UCI 2.1 category race and is part of the UCI Asia Tour.

== History ==
Tour of Azerbaijan (Iran) was established in 1986 by Asghar Khodayari and Akbar Goharkhani, with the name Tour de Urmia Lake. The stages of the tour were modified several times. In 2010, one stage of the tour was held in Nakhichevan, an autonomous republic of Azerbaijan. In 2013, Azerbaijan International Cycling Tour was renamed to Tour of Azerbaijan (Iran).

In 2016, for the first time, a cycling team from the United States, Team Illuminate, announced their participation in the race. They said they wanted to show "how cycling can connect people".

The 32nd edition of the tour rescheduled from May to October to avoid coincidence with Iran's presidential election. The organizers of the tour announced that the schedule of the following years will be in May as usual.

In 2020 and 2021, the race was not held.

== Past winners ==
Year	First place	Second place	Third place
Tour of Azerbaijan
1986	Mohammad Reza Bajoul (IRN)	Davoud Zeynali (IRN)	Abdolqasem Rahmaniyan (IRN)
1987	Mohammad Reza Bajoul (IRN)	Hassan Milani (IRN)	Ahad Pourniyazi (IRN)
1988	Mohammad Reza Bajoul (IRN)	Akbar Amjadi (IRN)	Mehran Safarzadeh (IRN)
1989	Hossein Mahmoudi (IRN)	Mostafa Chaychi (IRN)	Alireza Zangiabadi (IRN)
1990	Hossein Mahmoudi (IRN)	Abas Ismaili (IRN)	Alireza Zangiabadi (IRN)
1991	Tamer Avral (TUR)	Ayhan Aytakin (TUR)	Jamal Sheykhooni (SYR)
1992	Hassan Sharifzadeh (IRN)	Khosrow Qamari (IRN)	Hussain Eslami (IRN)
1993	Kasta Kolov (TKM)	Majid Vafaei (IRN)	Azari (IRN)
1994	Dmitrij Katmakov (TKM)	Majid Sheyk (SYR)	Manis Shabloni (ARM)
1995	Yurij Chekov (KAZ)	Valery Tityev (KGZ)	Hossein Askari (IRN)
1996	Sergej Belousov (KAZ)	Ahad Kazemi (IRN)	Kosonov (KAZ)
1997	Andrey Mizurov (KAZ)	Valery Titiyov (KAZ)	Sergej Belousov (KAZ)
1998	Ahad Kazemi (IRN)	Ghader Mizbani (IRN)	Andrej Kashin (KAZ)
1999	Ahad Kazemi (IRN)	Hossein Askari (IRN)	Ghader Mizbani (IRN)
2000	Ghader Mizbani (IRN)	Hossein Maleki (IRN)	Ahad Kazemi (IRN)
2001	Ahad Kazemi (IRN)	Hossein Askari (IRN)	Vazgen Golijaniyan (ARM)
2002	Ghader Mizbani (IRN)	Mert Mutlu (TUR)	Ahad Kazemi (IRN)
2003	Ahad Kazemi (IRN)	Mehdi Sohrabi (IRN)	Pawel Novdak (TUR)
2004	Alexey Kolessov (KAZ)	Mostafa Rezaei Khormizi (IRN)	Mert Mutlu (TUR)
2005	Ghader Mizbani (IRN)	Ahad Kazemi (IRN)	Omar Hasanein (SYR)
2006	Ghader Mizbani (IRN)	Ahad Kazemi (IRN)	Mostafa Rezaei Khormizi (IRN)
2007	Hossein Askari (IRN)	Ghader Mizbani (IRN)	Rahim Ememi (IRN)
2008	Hossein Askari (IRN)	Ghader Mizbani (IRN)	Ahad Kazemi (IRN)
2009	Ahad Kazemi (IRN)	Hossein Askari (IRN)	Ghader Mizbani (IRN)
2010	Ghader Mizbani (IRN)	Amir Zargari (IRN)	Hossein Askari (IRN)
2011	Mehdi Sohrabi (IRN)	Hossein Askari (IRN)	Ghader Mizbani (IRN)
2012	Javier Ramírez (ESP)	Abbas Saeidi Tanha (IRN)	Hossein Askari (IRN)
Tour of Iran (Azarbaijan)
2013	Ghader Mizbani (IRN)	Milan Kadlec (CZE)	Amir Kolahdozhagh (IRN)
2014	Ghader Mizbani (IRN)	Samad Pourseyedi (IRN)	Ramin Mehrabani (IRN)
2015	Samad Pourseyedi (IRN)	Rahim Ememi (IRN)	Ramin Mehrabani (IRN)
2016	Samad Pourseyedi (IRN)	Ahad Kazemi (IRN)	Rahim Ememi (IRN)
2017	Rob Ruijgh (NED)	Ilya Davidenok (KAZ)	Nicola Toffali (ITA)
2018	Dmitry Sokolov (RUS)	Meron Abraham (ERI)	Venantas Lašinis (LTU)
2019	Savva Novikov (RUS)	Cristian Raileanu (MDA)	Youcef Reguigui (ALG)
2022	Gianni Marchand (BEL)	Saeid Safarzadeh (IRN)	Dawit Yemane (ERI)
2023	Saeid Safarzadeh (IRN)	Anatoliy Budyak (UKR)	Anton Kuzmin (KAZ)
2024	No race		
2025	Saeid Safarzadeh (IRN)	Milkias Maekele (ERI)	Yoel Habteab (ERI)

=== Multiple winners ===
Number of wins	Rider	Country	Years
7	Ghader Mizbani	IRN	2000, 2002, 2005, 2006, 2010, 2013, 2014
5	Ahad Kazemi	IRN	1998, 1999, 2001, 2003, 2009
3	Mohammad Reza Bajoul	IRN	1986, 1987, 1988
2	Hossein Mahmoudi	IRN	1989, 1990
2	Hossein Askari	IRN	2007, 2008
2	Samad Pourseyedi	IRN	2015, 2016
2	Saeid Safarzadeh	IRN	2023, 2025
