= International Presidency Tour =

Professional cycling race in Iran

Race details
- Date: May
- Region: Iran
- Discipline: Road race
- Competition: UCI Asia Tour
- Type: Stage race

History
- First edition: 2008
- Editions: 4 (as of 2011)
- Final edition: 2011
- First winner: Ahad Kazemi (IRI)
- Most wins: No repeat winners
- Final winner: Samad Pourseyedi (IRI)

The International Presidency Tour was a professional cycling race held annually in Iran. It was part of UCI Asia Tour in category 2.2.

== Winners ==
Year	Country	Rider	Team
2008	Iran	Ahad Kazemi	Tabriz Petrochemical Team
2009	Iran	Ghader Mizbani	Tabriz Petrochemical Team
2010	Iran	Hossein Askari	Tabriz Petrochemical Team
2011	Iran	Samad Pourseyedi	Azad University Iran
