= Abbas Saeidi Tanha =

Iranian cyclist

Personal information
- Born: 4 January 1981 (age 45) Zanjan, Iran
- Height: 168 cm (5 ft 6 in)
- Weight: 70 kg (150 lb)

Cycling career
- Sport: Cycling
- Current team: Retired
- Discipline: Road
- Role: Rider

Professional teams
- 2005: Paykan
- 2007–2013: Islamic Azad University Cycling Team

Abbas Saeidi Tanha (born 4 January 1981) is an Iranian former cyclist.

== Palmares ==
2005
1st Stage 4 Tour of Iran (Azerbaijan)
2006
2nd Asian Games Team Time Trial
2008
1st Stage 1 International Presidency Tour
2nd Overall Kerman Tour

1st Stage 2

2009
1st Stage 5 Tour d'Indonesia
2nd Overall Milad De Nour Tour
2010
1st Overall Kerman Tour

1st Stages 1 (TTT) & 2

1st Stage 4 International Presidency Tour
2011
1st National Road Race Championships
2012
2nd National Time Trial Championships
2nd Overall Tour of Iran (Azerbaijan)
