= Tour de Taiwan =

Taiwanese multi-day road cycling race

Race details
- Date: March
- Region: Taiwan
- English name: Tour of Taiwan
- Local name: 國際自由車環台公路大賽 (in Chinese)
- Discipline: Road
- Competition: UCI Asia Tour 2.1
- Type: Stage race
- Organiser: Chinese Taipei Cycling Association
- Web site: www.tourdetaiwan.org.tw

History
- First edition: 1978
- First winner: Ralf Schmidt (GER)
- Most wins: No repeat winners
- Most recent: Matys Grisel (FRA)

The Tour de Taiwan is an annual professional road bicycle racing stage race held in Taiwan since 1978, and has been part of the UCI Asia Tour since 2005. It was classed a 2.1 category race for the first time in 2012.

== History ==
The Tour de Taiwan was established by Giant Sports Foundation's founder, King Liu, in 1978. The first race began in Taipei, continued through Western Taiwan, Southern Taiwan, Eastern Taiwan, and finally ended in Taipei.

This cycling tour championship has been recognized by the International Cycling Union (UCI) in 2005, and was integrated with the Taipei Cycle Show, organized by the Taiwan External Trade Development Council, in 2006.

== Past winners ==
| Year | Country | Rider | Team |
|---|---|---|---|
| 1994 | Germany | Ralf Schmidt | |
| 1999 | New Zealand | Brendan Vesty | Navigare–Gaerne |
| 2003 | Iran | Ghader Mizbani | Giant Asia Racing Team |
| 2004 | Germany | Moritz Milatz | Merida Europe Team |
| 2005 | Iran | Ahad Kazemi | Giant Asia Racing Team |
| 2006 | Ireland | Stephen Gallagher | Giant Asia Racing Team |
| 2007 | United States | Shawn Milne | Health Net–Maxxis |
| 2008 | United States | John Murphy | Health Net–Maxxis |
| 2009 | Poland | Krzysztof Jeżowski | Merida Europe Team |
| 2010 | Ireland | David McCann | Giant Asia Racing Team |
| 2011 | Austria | Markus Eibegger | Tabriz Petrochemical Team |
| 2012 | Australia | Rhys Pollock | Drapac Cycling |
| 2013 | Australia | Bernard Sulzberger | Drapac Cycling |
| 2014 | France | Rémy Di Gregorio | Team La Pomme Marseille 13 |
| 2015 | Iran | Samad Pourseyedi | Tabriz Petrochemical Team |
| 2016 | Australia | Robbie Hucker | Avanti IsoWhey Sports |
| 2017 | Spain | Benjamín Prades | Team Ukyo |
| 2018 | Japan | Yukiya Arashiro | Japan (national team) |
| 2019 | Australia | Jonathan Clarke | Floyd's Pro Cycling |
| 2020 | Australia | Nicholas White | Team BridgeLane |
| 2021 | No race due to the COVID-19 pandemic | | |
| 2022 | Australia | Ben Dyball | Team Ukyo |
| 2023 | Netherlands | Jeroen Meijers | Terengganu Polygon Cycling Team |
| 2024 | Great Britain | Joseph Blackmore | Israel–Premier Tech |
| 2025 | Australia | Brady Gilmore | Israel–Premier Tech |
| 2026 | France | Matys Grisel | Lotto–Intermarché |

== See also ==
- List of sporting events in Taiwan
