= Kerman Tour =

Race details
- Date: February
- Region: Iran
- Discipline: Road race
- Competition: UCI Asia Tour
- Type: Stage race

History
- First edition: 2005
- Editions: 6 (as of 2011)
- Final edition: 2011
- First winner: Hossein Askari (IRI)
- Most wins: Ghader Mizbani (IRI) (2 wins)
- Final winner: Mehdi Sohrabi (IRI)

The Kerman Tour was a professional cycling race held annually in Iran. It was part of UCI Asia Tour in category 2.2.

== Winners ==
Year	Country	Rider	Team
2005	Iran	Hossein Askari	Giant Asia Racing Team
2006	Iran	Ghader Mizbani	Giant Asia Racing Team
2007	Kazakhstan	Pavel Nevdakh	
2008	Iran	Ghader Mizbani	Tabriz Petrochemical Team
2009	No race		
2010	Iran	Abbas Saeidi Tanha	Azad University Iran
2011	Iran	Mehdi Sohrabi	Tabriz Petrochemical Team
