= Tour de East Java =

Indonesian multi-day road cycling race

Race details
- Date: September
- Region: East Java, Indonesia
- English name: Tour of East Java
- Discipline: Road
- Competition: UCI Asia Tour 2.2
- Type: Stage race
- Web site: tourdeeastjava.com

History
- First edition: 2005
- Editions: 10
- Final edition: 2014
- First winner: Ahad Kazemi (IRI)
- Most wins: Ghader Mizbani (IRI) (3 wins)
- Final winner: Ghader Mizbani (IRI)

The Tour de East Java is a professional road bicycle racing stage race, that was held in East Java, Indonesia from 2005 to 2014. The race was sanctioned by the International Cycling Union (UCI) as a 2.2 category race as part of the UCI Asia Tour.

== Past winners ==
Year	Country	Rider	Team
2005	Iran	Ahad Kazemi	Giant Asia Racing Team
2006	Iran	Ghader Mizbani	Giant Asia Racing Team
2007	Germany	Björn Glasner	Regiostrom–Senges
2008	Iran	Ghader Mizbani	Tabriz Petrochemical Team
2009	Kazakhstan	Andrey Mizurov	Tabriz Petrochemical Team
2010	Iran	Hossein Alizadeh	Tabriz Petrochemical Team
2011	Iran	Hossein Jahanbanian	Tabriz Petrochemical Team
2012	Kazakhstan	Ivan Tsissaruk	Astana Track Team
2013	Spain	José Vicente Toribio	Team Ukyo
2014	Iran	Ghader Mizbani	Tabriz Petrochemical Team
