= Milad De Nour Tour =

Race details
- Date: September
- Region: Iran
- Discipline: Road race
- Competition: UCI Asia Tour
- Type: Stage race

History
- First edition: 2005
- Editions: 7 (as of 2011)
- Final edition: 2011
- First winner: David McCann (IRE)
- Most wins: Ghader Mizbani (IRI) (3 wins)
- Final winner: Ghader Mizbani (IRI)

The Milad De Nour Tour was a professional cycling race held annually in Iran. It was part of UCI Asia Tour in category 2.2.

== Winners ==
Year	Country	Rider	Team
2005	Ireland	David McCann	Giant Asia Racing Team
2006	Iran	Ghader Mizbani	Giant Asia Racing Team
2007	Iran	Ghader Mizbani	Giant Asia Racing Team
2008	Iran	Ahad Kazemi	Tabriz Petrochemical Team
2009	New Zealand	Mehdi Sohrabi	Tabriz Petrochemical Team
2010	Iran	Ramin Mehrabani	Azad University Iran
2011	Iran	Ghader Mizbani	Tabriz Petrochemical Team
