= 2015 Tour of Iran (Azerbaijan) =

2015 UCI Asia Tour, race 30

Race details
- Dates: 28 May – 2 June
- Stages: 6
- Distance: 968.8 km (602.0 mi)
- Winning time: 23h 50' 26"

Results
Jersey awarded to the overall winner	Winner	Samad Pourseyedi (IRN)	(Tabriz Petrochemical Team)
	Second	Rahim Emami (IRN)	(Pishgaman–Giant)
	Third	Ramin Mehrabani (IRN)	(Pishgaman–Giant)
Jersey awarded to the points classification winner	Points	Hossein Askari (IRN)	(Pishgaman–Giant)
Jersey awarded to the mountains classification winner	Mountains	Saeid Safarzadeh (IRN)	(Tabriz Shahrdari Team)
	Team	Tabriz Petrochemical Team	

2015 Tour of Iran (Azerbaijan) was the 30th edition of the Tour of Iran (Azerbaijan) which took place over six stages, between 28 May and 2 June 2015 in Iranian Azerbaijan. The race was won by Iranian rider Samad Pourseyedi.

== Schedule ==
Stage	Date	Course	Distance	Winner
1	28 May	Tabriz to Meshginshahr	163.8 km (101.8 mi)	Alexandr Shushemoin (KAZ)
2	29 May	Sareyn to Tabriz	188.2 km (116.9 mi)	Saeid Safarzadeh (IRN)
3	30 May	Tabriz to Urmia	144.4 km (89.7 mi)	İsmail Akşoy (TUR)
4	31 May	Urmia to Aras Free Zone	208.4 km (129.5 mi)	Hossein Askari (IRN)
5	1 June	Aras Free Zone to Ayenehlu	150 km (93.2 mi)	Samad Pourseyedi (IRN)
6	2 June	Tabriz to Tabriz	114 km (70.8 mi)	Theodore Yates (AUS)

== Stages ==
=== Stage 1 ===
28 May 2015 — Tabriz to Meshginshahr, 163.8 km (101.8 mi)

Stage 1 result
Rank	Rider	Team	Time
1	Alexandr Shushemoin (KAZ)	Vino 4ever	3h 27' 25"
2	Samad Pourseyedi (IRN)	Tabriz Petrochemical Team	+ 41"
3	Hossein Askari (IRN)	Pishgaman–Giant	+ 41"
4	Khalil Khorshid (IRN)	Tabriz Shahrdari Team	+ 41"
5	Rahim Emami (IRN)	Pishgaman–Giant	+ 41"
6	Ghader Mizbani (IRN)	Tabriz Petrochemical Team	+ 44"
7	Mehdi Sohrabi (IRN)	Tabriz Petrochemical Team	+ 1' 05"
8	Amir Zargari (IRN)	Pishgaman–Giant	+ 1' 06"
9	Behnam Maleki (IRN)	Tabriz Petrochemical Team	+ 1' 07"
10	Ramin Mehrabani (IRN)	Pishgaman–Giant	+ 1' 07"

General classification after stage 1
Rank	Rider	Team	Time
1	Alexandr Shushemoin (KAZ)	Vino 4ever	3h 27' 12"
2	Samad Pourseyedi (IRN)	Tabriz Petrochemical Team	+ 48"
3	Hossein Askari (IRN)	Pishgaman–Giant	+ 50"
4	Khalil Khorshid (IRN)	Tabriz Shahrdari Team	+ 54"
5	Rahim Emami (IRN)	Pishgaman–Giant	+ 54"
6	Ghader Mizbani (IRN)	Tabriz Petrochemical Team	+ 57"
7	Mehdi Sohrabi (IRN)	Tabriz Petrochemical Team	+ 1' 18"
8	Amir Zargari (IRN)	Pishgaman–Giant	+ 1' 19"
9	Behnam Maleki (IRN)	Tabriz Petrochemical Team	+ 1' 20"
10	Ramin Mehrabani (IRN)	Pishgaman–Giant	+ 1' 20"

=== Stage 2 ===
29 May 2015 — Sareyn to Tabriz, 188.2 km (116.9 mi)

Stage 2 result
Rank	Rider	Team	Time
1	Saeid Safarzadeh (IRN)	Tabriz Shahrdari Team	5h 35' 52"
2	Mehdi Sohrabi (IRN)	Tabriz Petrochemical Team	+ 5"
3	Hossein Nateghi (IRN)	Sepahan Pro Team	+ 5"
4	Samad Pourseyedi (IRN)	Tabriz Petrochemical Team	+ 5"
5	Alistair Donohoe (AUS)	Search2retain–Health.com.au	+ 5"
6	Amir Zargari (IRN)	Pishgaman–Giant	+ 5"
7	Hossein Askari (IRN)	Pishgaman–Giant	+ 5"
8	Miraç Kal (TUR)	Torku Şekerspor	+ 5"
9	Khalil Khorshid (IRN)	Tabriz Shahrdari Team	+ 5"
10	Rahim Emami (IRN)	Pishgaman–Giant	+ 5"

General classification after stage 2
Rank	Rider	Team	Time
1	Alexandr Shushemoin (KAZ)	Vino 4ever	9h 03' 09"
2	Hossein Askari (IRN)	Pishgaman–Giant	+ 47"
3	Samad Pourseyedi (IRN)	Tabriz Petrochemical Team	+ 48"
4	Rahim Emami (IRN)	Pishgaman–Giant	+ 52"
5	Khalil Khorshid (IRN)	Tabriz Shahrdari Team	+ 54"
6	Ghader Mizbani (IRN)	Tabriz Petrochemical Team	+ 57"
7	Mehdi Sohrabi (IRN)	Tabriz Petrochemical Team	+ 1' 12"
8	Amir Zargari (IRN)	Pishgaman–Giant	+ 1' 19"
9	Arvin Moazzami (IRN)	Pishgaman–Giant	+ 1' 19"
10	Ramin Mehrabani (IRN)	Pishgaman–Giant	+ 1' 20"

=== Stage 3 ===
30 May 2015 — Tabriz to Urmia, 144.4 km (89.7 mi)

Stage 3 result
Rank	Rider	Team	Time
1	İsmail Akşoy (TUR)	Torku Şekerspor	3h 21' 17"
2	Theodore Yates (AUS)	Navitas Satalyst	+ 0"
3	Angus Tobin (AUS)	Search2retain–Health.com.au	+ 0"
4	Hossein Nateghi (IRN)	Sepahan Pro Team	+ 0"
5	Mehdi Sohrabi (IRN)	Tabriz Petrochemical Team	+ 0"
6	Narankhuu Bat-Erdene (MGL)	Mongolia (national team)	+ 0"
7	Afiq Huznie Othman (MYS)	NSC Cycling Team	+ 0"
8	Hossaini Reza (IRN)	Sepahan Pro Team	+ 0"
9	Myagmarsuren Baasankhuu (MGL)	Mongolia (national team)	+ 0"
10	Fatih Keleş (TUR)	Torku Şekerspor	+ 0"

General classification after stage 3
Rank	Rider	Team	Time
1	Alexandr Shushemoin (KAZ)	Vino 4ever	12h 24' 26"
2	Hossein Askari (IRN)	Pishgaman–Giant	+ 47"
3	Samad Pourseyedi (IRN)	Tabriz Petrochemical Team	+ 48"
4	Rahim Emami (IRN)	Pishgaman–Giant	+ 52"
5	Khalil Khorshid (IRN)	Tabriz Shahrdari Team	+ 54"
6	Ghader Mizbani (IRN)	Tabriz Petrochemical Team	+ 57"
7	Mehdi Sohrabi (IRN)	Tabriz Petrochemical Team	+ 1' 12"
8	Amir Zargari (IRN)	Pishgaman–Giant	+ 1' 19"
9	Arvin Moazzami (IRN)	Pishgaman–Giant	+ 1' 19"
10	Ramin Mehrabani (IRN)	Pishgaman–Giant	+ 1' 20"

=== Stage 4 ===
31 May 2015 — Urmia to Aras Free Zone, 208.4 km (129.5 mi)

Stage 4 result
Rank	Rider	Team	Time
1	Hossein Askari (IRN)	Pishgaman–Giant	4h 18' 43"
2	Arvin Moazzami (IRN)	Pishgaman–Giant	+ 0"
3	Amir Zargari (IRN)	Pishgaman–Giant	+ 8"
4	Samad Pourseyedi (IRN)	Tabriz Petrochemical Team	+ 8"
5	Rahim Emami (IRN)	Pishgaman–Giant	+ 8"
6	Ramin Mehrabani (IRN)	Pishgaman–Giant	+ 8"
7	Mehdi Sohrabi (IRN)	Tabriz Petrochemical Team	+ 1' 08"
8	Behnam Maleki (IRN)	Tabriz Petrochemical Team	+ 1' 08"
9	Ali Nemati Khiavi (IRN)	Team Lvshan Landscape	+ 1' 08"
10	Amir Kolahdouz (IRN)	Tabriz Petrochemical Team	+ 1' 08"

General classification after stage 4
Rank	Rider	Team	Time
1	Hossein Askari (IRN)	Pishgaman–Giant	16h 43' 46"
2	Samad Pourseyedi (IRN)	Tabriz Petrochemical Team	+ 19"
3	Rahim Emami (IRN)	Pishgaman–Giant	+ 23"
4	Arvin Moazzami (IRN)	Pishgaman–Giant	+ 36"
5	Amir Zargari (IRN)	Pishgaman–Giant	+ 46"
6	Ramin Mehrabani (IRN)	Pishgaman–Giant	+ 51"
7	Ghader Mizbani (IRN)	Tabriz Petrochemical Team	+ 1' 28"
8	Amir Kolahdouz (IRN)	Tabriz Petrochemical Team	+ 1' 51"
9	Mehdi Sohrabi (IRN)	Tabriz Petrochemical Team	+ 2' 43"
10	Alexandr Shushemoin (KAZ)	Vino 4ever	+ 2' 51"

=== Stage 5 ===
1 June 2015 — Aras Free Zone to Ayenehlu, 150 km (93.2 mi)

Stage 5 result
Rank	Rider	Team	Time
1	Samad Pourseyedi (IRN)	Tabriz Petrochemical Team	4h 30' 23"
2	Amir Kolahdouz (IRN)	Tabriz Petrochemical Team	+ 3' 18"
3	Ghader Mizbani (IRN)	Tabriz Petrochemical Team	+ 3' 18"
4	Ramin Mehrabani (IRN)	Pishgaman–Giant	+ 3' 18"
5	Saeid Safarzadeh (IRN)	Tabriz Shahrdari Team	+ 3' 23"
6	Rahim Emami (IRN)	Pishgaman–Giant	+ 3' 23"
7	Ali Ashkbous (IRN)	Tabriz Shahrdari Team	+ 3' 42"
8	Hossein Alizadeh (IRN)	Tabriz Shahrdari Team	+ 5' 21"
9	Ali Nemati Khiavi (IRN)	Team Lvshan Landscape	+ 6' 53"
10	Amir Zargari (IRN)	Pishgaman–Giant	+ 7' 09"

General classification after stage 5
Rank	Rider	Team	Time
1	Samad Pourseyedi (IRN)	Tabriz Petrochemical Team	21h 14' 18"
2	Rahim Emami (IRN)	Pishgaman–Giant	+ 3' 57"
3	Ramin Mehrabani (IRN)	Pishgaman–Giant	+ 4' 20"
4	Ghader Mizbani (IRN)	Tabriz Petrochemical Team	+ 4' 33"
5	Amir Kolahdouz (IRN)	Tabriz Petrochemical Team	+ 4' 54"
6	Hossein Askari (IRN)	Pishgaman–Giant	+ 7' 31"
7	Saeid Safarzadeh (IRN)	Tabriz Shahrdari Team	+ 7' 44"
8	Amir Zargari (IRN)	Pishgaman–Giant	+ 7' 46"
9	Khalil Khorshid (IRN)	Tabriz Shahrdari Team	+ 11' 16"
10	Hossein Alizadeh (IRN)	Tabriz Shahrdari Team	+ 11' 17"

=== Stage 6 ===
2 June 2015 — Tabriz to Tabriz, 114 km (70.8 mi)

Stage 6 result
Rank	Rider	Team	Time
1	Theodore Yates (AUS)	Navitas Satalyst	2h 36' 08"
2	Angus Tobin (AUS)	Search2retain–Health.com.au	+ 0"
3	Vadim Galeyev (KAZ)	Vino 4ever	+ 0"
4	Mehdi Sohrabi (IRN)	Tabriz Petrochemical Team	+ 0"
5	Alistair Donohoe (AUS)	Search2retain–Health.com.au	+ 0"
6	Yevgeniy Gidich (KAZ)	Vino 4ever	+ 0"
7	Nazir Jaser (SYR)	Syria (national team)	+ 0"
8	Fatih Keleş (TUR)	Torku Şekerspor	+ 0"
9	Low Ji Wen (SIN)	CCN	+ 0"
10	Myagmarsuren Baasankhuu (MGL)	Mongolia (national team)	+ 0"

Final general classification
Rank	Rider	Team	Time
1	Samad Pourseyedi (IRN)	Tabriz Petrochemical Team	23h 50' 26"
2	Rahim Emami (IRN)	Pishgaman–Giant	+ 3' 57"
3	Ramin Mehrabani (IRN)	Pishgaman–Giant	+ 4' 20"
4	Ghader Mizbani (IRN)	Tabriz Petrochemical Team	+ 4' 33"
5	Amir Kolahdouz (IRN)	Tabriz Petrochemical Team	+ 4' 54"
6	Hossein Askari (IRN)	Pishgaman–Giant	+ 7' 30"
7	Saeid Safarzadeh (IRN)	Tabriz Shahrdari Team	+ 7' 42"
8	Amir Zargari (IRN)	Pishgaman–Giant	+ 7' 43"
9	Khalil Khorshid (IRN)	Tabriz Shahrdari Team	+ 11' 16"
10	Hossein Alizadeh (IRN)	Tabriz Shahrdari Team	+ 11' 17"

== Final standings ==
=== General and Asian rider classifications ===
Final classification
Rank	Rider	Team	Time
1	Samad Pourseyedi (IRN)	Tabriz Petrochemical Team	23h 50' 26"
2	Rahim Emami (IRN)	Pishgaman–Giant	+ 3' 57"
3	Ramin Mehrabani (IRN)	Pishgaman–Giant	+ 4' 20"
4	Ghader Mizbani (IRN)	Tabriz Petrochemical Team	+ 4' 33"
5	Amir Kolahdouz (IRN)	Tabriz Petrochemical Team	+ 4' 54"
6	Hossein Askari (IRN)	Pishgaman–Giant	+ 7' 30"
7	Saeid Safarzadeh (IRN)	Tabriz Shahrdari Team	+ 7' 42"
8	Amir Zargari (IRN)	Pishgaman–Giant	+ 7' 43"
9	Khalil Khorshid (IRN)	Tabriz Shahrdari Team	+ 11' 16"
10	Hossein Alizadeh (IRN)	Tabriz Shahrdari Team	+ 11' 17"

=== Points classification ===
Final points classification
Rank	Rider	Team	Points
1	Hossein Askari (IRN)	Pishgaman–Giant	11
2	Samad Pourseyedi (IRN)	Tabriz Petrochemical Team	10
3	Alexandr Shushemoin (KAZ)	Vino 4ever	8
4	Theodore Yates (AUS)	Navitas Satalyst	8
5	Saeid Safarzadeh (IRN)	Tabriz Shahrdari Team	7
6	Hossein Jahanbanian (IRN)	Tabriz Shahrdari Team	6
7	Amir Zargari (IRN)	Pishgaman–Giant	5
8	Oliver Kent-Spark (AUS)	Navitas Satalyst	5
9	Arvin Moazzami (IRN)	Pishgaman–Giant	5
10	Angus Tobin (AUS)	Navitas Satalyst	5

=== Mountains classification ===
Final mountains classification
Rank	Rider	Team	Points
1	Saeid Safarzadeh (IRN)	Tabriz Shahrdari Team	41
2	Hossein Jahanbanian (IRN)	Tabriz Shahrdari Team	28
3	Samad Pourseyedi (IRN)	Tabriz Petrochemical Team	27
4	Amir Kolahdouz (IRN)	Tabriz Petrochemical Team	20
5	Ghader Mizbani (IRN)	Tabriz Petrochemical Team	16
6	Rahim Emami (IRN)	Pishgaman–Giant	14
7	Ramin Mehrabani (IRN)	Pishgaman–Giant	12
8	Hossein Alizadeh (IRN)	Tabriz Shahrdari Team	11
9	Mohsen Rahmani (IRN)	Sepahan Pro Team	11
10	Yalmaz Habach (SYR)	Syria (national team)	8

=== Teams classification ===
Final teams classification
Rank	Team	Time
1	Tabriz Petrochemical Team	71h 41' 09"
2	Pishgaman–Giant	+ 4' 56"
3	Tabriz Shahrdari Team	+ 11' 05"
4	Sepahan Pro Team	+ 1h 06' 06"
5	Torku Şekerspor	+ 1h 15' 48"
6	Iran (national team)	+ 1h 37' 54"
7	Vino 4ever	+ 1h 49' 45"
8	AC Sparta Praha	+ 1h 57' 54"
9	Search2retain–Health.com.au	+ 1h 59' 18"
10	Navitas Satalyst	+ 2h 55' 41"
