= 2015 UCI Asia Tour =

- Eleventh edition of the UCI Asia Tour

Details
- Dates: 1 February 2015–19 December 2015
- Location: Asia
- Races: 37

Champions
- Individual champion: Samad Pourseyedi (IRI) (Tabriz Petrochemical Team)
- Teams' champion: Pishgaman–Giant
- Nations' champion: Iran

The 2015 UCI Asia Tour was the 11th season of the UCI Asia Tour. The season began on 1 February 2015 with the Le Tour de Filipinas and ended on 19 December 2015 with the Tour of Al Zubarah.

The points leader, based on the cumulative results of previous races, wears the UCI Asia Tour cycling jersey. Samad Pourseyedi from Iran is the defending champion of the 2013–14 UCI Asia Tour.

Throughout the season, points are awarded to the top finishers of stages within stage races and the final general classification standings of each of the stages races and one-day events. The quality and complexity of a race also determines how many points are awarded to the top finishers, the higher the UCI rating of a race, the more points are awarded.

The UCI ratings from highest to lowest are as follows:

- Multi-day events: 2.HC, 2.1 and 2.2
- One-day events: 1.HC, 1.1 and 1.2

== Events ==
Date	Race name	Location	UCI Rating	Winner	Team	Ref
1–4 February	Tour de Filipinas	Philippines	2.2	Thomas Lebas (FRA)	Bridgestone–Anchor	
4–7 February	Dubai Tour	United Arab Emirates	2.HC	Mark Cavendish (GBR)	Etixx–Quick-Step	
8–13 February	Tour of Qatar	Qatar	2.HC	Niki Terpstra (NED)	Etixx–Quick-Step	
12 February	Asian Cycling Championships – Road Race	Thailand	CC	Hossein Askari (IRI)	Iran (national team)	
14 February	Asian Cycling Championships – Time Trial	Thailand	CC	Hossein Askari (IRI)	Iran (national team)	
17–22 February	Tour of Oman	Oman	2.HC	Rafael Valls (ESP)	Lampre–Merida	
8–15 March	Tour de Langkawi	Malaysia	2.HC	Youcef Reguigui (ALG)	MTN–Qhubeka	
22–26 March	Tour de Taiwan	Taiwan	2.1	Samad Pourseyedi (IRI)	Tabriz Petrochemical Team	
1–6 April	Tour of Thailand	Thailand	2.2	Yasuharu Nakajima (JPN)	Aisan Racing Team	
6–9 May	Tour de Ijen	Indonesia	2.2	Peter Pouly (FRA)	Pishgaman-Giant Team	
17–24 May	Tour of Japan	Japan	2.1	Samad Pourseyedi (IRI)	Tabriz Petrochemical Team	
28 May–2 June	Tour of Iran (Azerbaijan)	Iran	2.1	Samad Pourseyedi (IRI)	Tabriz Petrochemical Team	
28–31 May	Tour de Kumano	Japan	2.2	Benjamín Prades (ESP)	Matrix Powertag	
7–14 June	Tour de Korea	South Korea	2.1	Caleb Ewan (AUS)	Orica–GreenEDGE	
5–18 July	Tour of Qinghai Lake	China	2.HC	Radoslav Rogina (CRO)	Adria Mobil	
11–13 September	Tour de Hokkaido	Japan	2.2	Riccardo Stacchiotti (ITA)	Nippo–Vini Fantini	
2–9 October	Tour of China I	China	2.1	Daniele Colli (ITA)	Nippo–Vini Fantini	
3–11 October	Tour de Singkarak	Indonesia	2.2	Arvin Moazemi (IRI)	Pishgaman–Giant	
4 October	Tour of Almaty	Kazakhstan	1.1	Alexey Lutsenko (KAZ)	Astana	
8–11 October	Abu Dhabi Tour	United Arab Emirates	2.1	Esteban Chaves (COL)	Orica–GreenEDGE	
11–18 October	Tour of China II	China	2.1	Mattia Gavazzi (ITA)	Amore & Vita–Selle SMP	
18 October	Japan Cup	Japan	1.HC	Bauke Mollema (NED)	Trek Factory Racing	
20–28 October	Tour of Hainan	China	2.HC	Sacha Modolo (ITA)	Lampre–Merida	
31 October–8 November	Tour of Taihu Lake	China	2.1	Jakub Mareczko (ITA)	Southeast Pro Cycling	
31 October–4 November	Tour de Borneo	Malaysia	2.2	Peeter Pruus (EST)	Rietumu-Delfin	
8 November	Tour de Okinawa	Japan	1.2	Jason Christie (NZL)	Avanti Racing Team	
10–11 November	Tour of Yancheng Coastal Wetlands	China	2.2	Evaldas Šiškevičius (LIT)	Team Marseille 13 KTM	
28 November–1 December	Sharjah Cycling Tour	United Arab Emirates	2.2	Soufiane Haddi (MAR)	Skydive Dubai–Al Ahli	
2 December	UAE Cup	United Arab Emirates	1.2	Maher Hasnaoui (TUN)	Skydive Dubai–Al Ahli	
9–13 December	Jelajah Malaysia	Malaysia	2.2	Francisco Mancebo (ESP)	Skydive Dubai–Al Ahli	
16–19 December	Tour of Al Zubarah	Qatar	2.2	Maher Hasnaoui (TUN)	Skydive Dubai–Al Ahli	

== Standings ==
Standings as of November 25th.

Rank	Name	Team	Points
1.	Samad Pourseyedi (IRI)	Tabriz Petrochemical Team	378
2.	Jakub Mareczko (ITA)	Southeast Pro Cycling	362
3.	Hossein Askari (IRI)	Pishgaman-Giant Team	335
4.	Mattia Gavazzi (ITA)	Amore & Vita-Selle SMP	333
5.	Andrea Palini (ITA)	Skydive Dubai Pro Cycling Team - Al Ahli Club	240
6.	Rahim Emami (IRI)	Pishgaman-Giant Team	239
7.	Patrick Bevin (NZL)	Avanti Racing Team	198
8.	Marko Kump (SLO)	Adria Mobil	177
9.	Youcef Reguigui (ALG)	MTN-Qhubeka	163
10.	Hossein Alizadeh (IRI)	RTS-Santic Racing Team	162

Rank	Team	Points
1.	Pishgaman-Giant Team	956
2.	Tabriz Petrochemical Team	726
3.	Nippo-Vini Fantini	542
4.	Southeast Pro Cycling	539
5.	RTS-Santic Racing Team	476

Rank	Nation	Points
1.	Iran	1643
2.	Kazakhstan	602
3.	Japan	541
4.	South Korea	276
5.	Philippines	264
