= 2015 Tour de Taiwan =

2015 UCI Asia Tour

Race details
- Dates: 22–26 March 2015
- Stages: 5
- Distance: 583.5 km (362.6 mi)
- Winning time: 14h 10' 34"

Results
Jersey awarded to the overall winner	Winner	Samad Pourseyedi (IRI)	(Tabriz Petrochemical Team)
	Second	Hossein Askari (IRI)	(Pishgaman–Giant)
	Third	Rahim Emami (IRI)	(Pishgaman–Giant)
Jersey awarded to the points classification winner	Points	Patrick Bevin (NZL)	(Avanti Racing Team)
Jersey awarded to the mountains classification winner	Mountains	Samad Pourseyedi (IRI)	(Tabriz Petrochemical Team)
	Team	Pishgaman–Giant	

The 2015 Tour de Taiwan was the thirteenth edition of the Tour de Taiwan cycling stage race. It started on 22 March and ended on 26 March, consisting of five stages and was rated as a 2.1 event on the 2015 UCI Asia Tour. The 2014 champion was Rémy Di Gregorio (Team Marseille 13 KTM), but his team was not selected to take part in the 2015 edition.

The race was won by Samad Pourseyedi (Tabriz Petrochemical Team). He finished third on the first hill-top finish on stage 2, then took a solo victory on stage 4. He defended his lead to the end of the race. The final podium was made up entirely of Iranian riders: two Pishgaman–Giant riders came second and third, Hossein Askari and Rahim Emami. Pourseyedi also won the mountains and Asian rider classifications, while Pishgaman–Giant were the best team. The points competition was won by Patrick Bevin (Avanti Racing Team), who won one stage, was in the top ten in four stages and was fourth overall in the race. Two stages were won by Wouter Wippert (Drapac Professional Cycling) and one by Tino Thömel (RTS–Santic Racing Team).

== Teams ==
UCI Professional Continental teams

- Drapac Professional Cycling
- Team Novo Nordisk

UCI Continental teams

- Avanti Racing Team
- Team Vorarlberg
- Team Stölting
- Synergy Baku
- Bike Aid
- Vino 4ever
- Team SmartStop
- Team Ukyo
- Utsunomiya Blitzen
- Tabriz Petrochemical Team
- RTS–Santic Racing Team
- Pishgaman–Giant
- HKSI Pro Cycling Team
- Parkhotel Valkenburg Continental Team
- Frøy Oslo

National teams

- Japan
- Uzbekistan
- Thailand
- South Korea
- Taiwan

== Stages ==
=== Stage 1 ===
22 March 2015 – Taipei to Taipei, 52 km (32 mi)

Stage 1 result
Rank	Rider	Team	Time
1	Wouter Wippert (NED)	Drapac Professional Cycling	1h 04' 54"
2	Aldo Ino Ilešič (SLO)	Team Vorarlberg	+ 0"
3	Park Keon-woo (KOR)	South Korea (national team)	+ 0"
4	Marco Zanotti (ITA)	Parkhotel Valkenburg Continental Team	+ 0"
5	Wu Po-hung (TAI)	Taiwan (national team)	+ 0"
6	Nikolai Lunder (NOR)	Team Frøy Oslo	+ 0"
7	Oleksandr Surutkovych (UKR)	Synergy Baku	+ 0"
8	Neil Van der Ploeg (AUS)	Avanti Racing Team	+ 0"
9	Kazushige Kuboki (JPN)	Team Ukyo	+ 0"
10	Yasuharu Nakajima (JPN)	Japan (national team)	+ 0"

General classification after stage 1
Rank	Rider	Team	Time
1	Wouter Wippert (NED)	Drapac Professional Cycling	1h 04' 44"
2	Aldo Ino Ilešič (SLO)	Team Vorarlberg	+ 4"
3	Park Keon-woo (KOR)	South Korea (national team)	+ 6"
4	Marco Zanotti (ITA)	Parkhotel Valkenburg Continental Team	+ 7"
5	Patrick Bevin (NZL)	Avanti Racing Team	+ 7"
6	Jurgen Van Diemen (NED)	Parkhotel Valkenburg Continental Team	+ 7"
7	Samir Jabrayilov (AZE)	Synergy Baku	+ 7"
8	Neil Van der Ploeg (AUS)	Avanti Racing Team	+ 8"
9	Víctor de la Parte (ESP)	Team Vorarlberg	+ 8"
10	Boris Shpilevsky (RUS)	RTS–Santic Racing Team	+ 9"

=== Stage 2 ===
23 March 2015 – Taoyuan County to Taoyuan County, 119.3 km (74.1 mi)

Stage 2 result
Rank	Rider	Team	Time
1	Patrick Bevin (NZL)	Avanti Racing Team	2h 50' 32"
2	Hossein Askari (IRI)	Pishgaman–Giant	+ 2"
3	Samad Pourseyedi (IRI)	Tabriz Petrochemical Team	+ 12"
4	Rahim Emami (IRI)	Pishgaman–Giant	+ 26"
5	Marco Zanotti (ITA)	Parkhotel Valkenburg Continental Team	+ 30"
6	Jasper Ockeloen (NED)	Parkhotel Valkenburg Continental Team	+ 30"
7	Travis Meyer (AUS)	Drapac Professional Cycling	+ 30"
8	Alexandr Shushemoin (KAZ)	Vino 4ever	+ 30"
9	Yukihiro Doi (JPN)	Team Ukyo	+ 30"
10	Víctor de la Parte (ESP)	Team Vorarlberg	+ 30"

General classification after stage 2
Rank	Rider	Team	Time
1	Patrick Bevin (NZL)	Avanti Racing Team	3h 55' 16"
2	Hossein Askari (IRI)	Pishgaman–Giant	+ 6"
3	Samad Pourseyedi (IRI)	Tabriz Petrochemical Team	+ 6"
4	Rahim Emami (IRI)	Pishgaman–Giant	+ 36"
5	Jasper Ockeloen (NED)	Parkhotel Valkenburg Continental Team	+ 37"
6	Marco Zanotti (ITA)	Parkhotel Valkenburg Continental Team	+ 40"
7	Yukihiro Doi (JPN)	Team Ukyo	+ 40"
8	Alexandr Shushemoin (KAZ)	Vino 4ever	+ 40"
9	Travis Meyer (AUS)	Drapac Professional Cycling	+ 40"
10	Víctor de la Parte (ESP)	Team Vorarlberg	+ 40"

=== Stage 3 ===
24 March 2015 – Changhua County to Changhua County, 131.8 km (81.9 mi)

Stage 3 result
Rank	Rider	Team	Time
1	Wouter Wippert (NED)	Drapac Professional Cycling	3h 01' 45"
2	Ioannis Tamouridis (GRE)	Synergy Baku	+ 0"
3	Samad Pourseyedi (IRI)	Tabriz Petrochemical Team	+ 0"
4	Patrick Bevin (NZL)	Avanti Racing Team	+ 0"
5	Yukihiro Doi (JPN)	Team Ukyo	+ 3"
6	Jure Kocjan (SLO)	Team SmartStop	+ 3"
7	Hideto Nakane (JPN)	Japan (national team)	+ 3"
8	Marco Zanotti (ITA)	Parkhotel Valkenburg Continental Team	+ 3"
9	Aldo Ino Ilešič (SLO)	Team Vorarlberg	+ 3"
10	Park Keon-woo (KOR)	South Korea (national team)	+ 3"

General classification after stage 3
Rank	Rider	Team	Time
1	Patrick Bevin (NZL)	Avanti Racing Team	6h 56' 58"
2	Hossein Askari (IRI)	Pishgaman–Giant	+ 12"
3	Samad Pourseyedi (IRI)	Tabriz Petrochemical Team	+ 17"
4	Marco Zanotti (ITA)	Parkhotel Valkenburg Continental Team	+ 43"
5	Víctor de la Parte (ESP)	Team Vorarlberg	+ 44"
6	Yukihiro Doi (JPN)	Team Ukyo	+ 46"
7	Alexandr Shushemoin (KAZ)	Vino 4ever	+ 46"
8	Travis Meyer (AUS)	Drapac Professional Cycling	+ 46"
9	Jasper Ockeloen (NED)	Parkhotel Valkenburg Continental Team	+ 46"
10	Darren Lapthorne (AUS)	Drapac Professional Cycling	+ 54"

=== Stage 4 ===
25 March 2015 – Sun Moon Lake to Tataka, 102.8 km (63.9 mi)

Stage 4 result
Rank	Rider	Team	Time
1	Samad Pourseyedi (IRI)	Tabriz Petrochemical Team	3h 12' 42"
2	Rahim Emami (IRI)	Pishgaman–Giant	+ 2"
3	Ghader Mizbani (IRI)	Tabriz Petrochemical Team	+ 16"
4	Hossein Askari (IRI)	Pishgaman–Giant	+ 25"
5	Oleg Zemlyakov (KAZ)	Vino 4ever	+ 1' 52"
6	Patrick Bevin (NZL)	Avanti Racing Team	+ 1' 57"
7	Arvin Moazzami (IRI)	Pishgaman–Giant	+ 1' 57"
8	Travis Meyer (AUS)	Drapac Professional Cycling	+ 1' 57"
9	Rob Britton (CAN)	Team SmartStop	+ 1' 57"
10	Amir Kolahdouz (IRI)	Tabriz Petrochemical Team	+ 1' 57"

General classification after stage 4
Rank	Rider	Team	Time
1	Samad Pourseyedi (IRI)	Tabriz Petrochemical Team	10h 09' 47"
2	Hossein Askari (IRI)	Pishgaman–Giant	+ 30"
3	Rahim Emami (IRI)	Pishgaman–Giant	+ 46"
4	Patrick Bevin (NZL)	Avanti Racing Team	+ 1' 50"
5	Víctor de la Parte (ESP)	Team Vorarlberg	+ 2' 34"
6	Yukihiro Doi (JPN)	Team Ukyo	+ 2' 36"
7	Travis Meyer (AUS)	Drapac Professional Cycling	+ 2' 36"
8	Jasper Ockeloen (NED)	Parkhotel Valkenburg Continental Team	+ 2' 36"
9	Choe Hyeong-min (KOR)	South Korea (national team)	+ 2' 48"
10	Rob Britton (CAN)	Team SmartStop	+ 2' 51"

=== Stage 5 ===
26 March 2015 – Jianshanpi Jiangnan Resort to Dapeng Bay, 177.6 km (110.4 mi)

Stage 5 result
Rank	Rider	Team	Time
1	Tino Thömel (GER)	RTS–Santic Racing Team	4h 00' 47"
2	Wouter Wippert (NED)	Drapac Professional Cycling	+ 0"
3	Ioannis Tamouridis (GRE)	Synergy Baku	+ 0"
4	Wu Po-hung (TAI)	Taiwan (national team)	+ 0"
5	Aldo Ino Ilešič (SLO)	Team Vorarlberg	+ 0"
6	Patrick Bevin (NZL)	Avanti Racing Team	+ 0"
7	Jang Sun-jae (KOR)	RTS–Santic Racing Team	+ 0"
8	Park Keon-woo (KOR)	South Korea (national team)	+ 0"
9	Yevgeniy Gidich (KAZ)	Vino 4ever	+ 0"
10	Marco Zanotti (ITA)	Parkhotel Valkenburg Continental Team	+ 0"

Final general classification
Rank	Rider	Team	Time
1	Samad Pourseyedi (IRI)	Tabriz Petrochemical Team	14h 10' 34"
2	Hossein Askari (IRI)	Pishgaman–Giant	+ 30"
3	Rahim Emami (IRI)	Pishgaman–Giant	+ 46"
4	Patrick Bevin (NZL)	Avanti Racing Team	+ 1' 50"
5	Víctor de la Parte (ESP)	Team Vorarlberg	+ 2' 34"
6	Yukihiro Doi (JPN)	Team Ukyo	+ 2' 36"
7	Jasper Ockeloen (NED)	Parkhotel Valkenburg Continental Team	+ 2' 36"
8	Travis Meyer (AUS)	Drapac Professional Cycling	+ 2' 36"
9	Choe Hyeong-min (KOR)	South Korea (national team)	+ 2' 48"
10	Rob Britton (CAN)	Team SmartStop	+ 2' 51"
