= 2016 Tour of Iran (Azerbaijan) =

Tour of Iran (Azerbaijan) 2016
2016 UCI Asia Tour, race 31
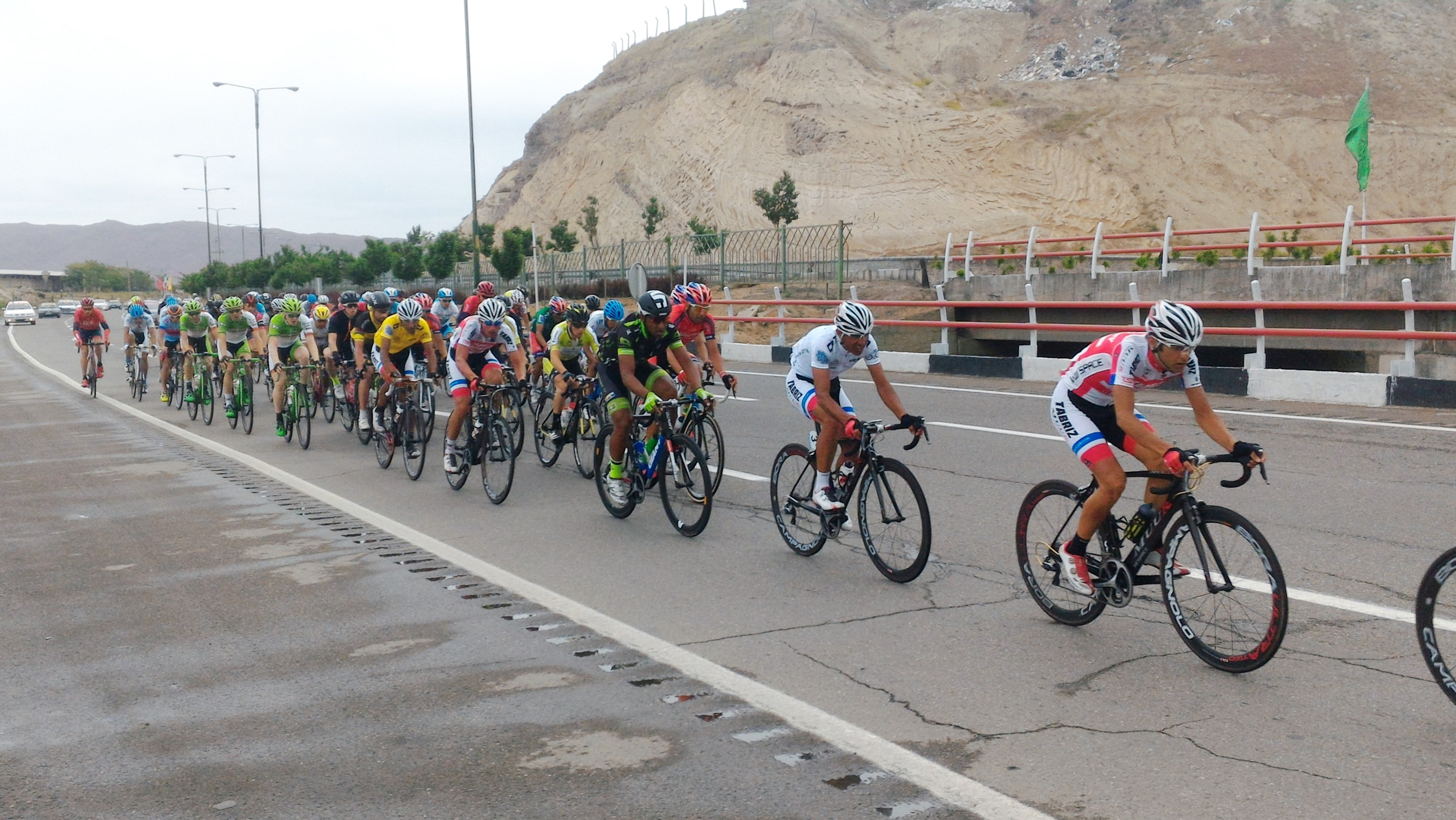
- Stage 6 of Tour of Iran (Azerbaijan)

Race details
- Dates: 13–18 May 2016
- Stages: 6
- Distance: 1,004.6 km (624.2 mi)

Results
	Winner	Samad Pourseyedi (IRN)	(Tabriz Shahrdari Team)
	Second	Ahad Kazemi (IRN)	(Tabriz Shahrdari Team)
	Third	Rahim Emami (IRN)	(Pishgaman–Giant)

Tour of Iran (Azerbaijan) 2016 is the 31st edition of Tour of Iran (Azerbaijan) which took place between May 13 till May 18, 2016 in Iranian Azerbaijan. The tour had 6 stages and the total length is 1005 km. In 31st stage of the tour 21 teams from four continents participate. For the first time in the history of Tour of Azerbaijan a cycling team from United States, Team Illuminate, participated in the tournament.

== Participant teams ==
UCI Professional Continental Teams Australia Drapac Professional Cycling
UCI Continental Teams Germany Christina Jewelry Pro Cycling United States Team Illuminate China Hy Sport–Look Continental Austria Hrinkow Advarics Cycleangteam China Team Lvshan Landscape Kuwait Massi–Kuwait Cycling Project	Iran Pishgaman–Giant Kazakhstan Vino 4ever SKO Austria Amplatz–BMC Japan Team Ukyo Hong Kong HKSI Pro Cycling Team Malaysia NSC Mycron	Iran Tabriz Shahrdari Team Taiwan RTS–Santic Racing Team Netherlands Parkhotel Valkenburg Continental Team Iran Tabriz Petrochemical CCN Team Malaysia Terengganu Cycling Team
National teams Iran	Mongolia	Syria

== Stages of the Tour ==
Stage	Date	Start	Finish	Distance	1st place	2nd place	3rd place
1	13 May	Tabriz	Urmia	162.4 km	Connor McCutcheon (USA)	Samad Pourseyedi (IRN)	Ahad Kazemi (IRN)
2	14 May	Urmia	Aras Free Zone in Jolfa	209.4 km	Peter Koning (NED)	Arvin Goodarzi (IRN)	Ahad Kazemi (IRN)
3	15 May	Jolfa	Tabriz	139.9 km	Derk Abel Beckeringh (NED)	Edwin Avila (COL)	Oleg Zemlyakov (KAZ)
4	16 May	Tabriz	Sarein	192.2 km	Samad Pourseyedi (IRN)	Rahim Emami (IRN)	Hamid Pourhashem (IRN)
5	17 May	Sareyn	Sahand Ski Resort	180.7 km	Ghader Mizbani (IRN)	Arvin Ghoudarzi (IRN)	Mehdi Sohrabi (IRN)
6	18 May	Tabriz	Tabriz	114 km	Yevgeniy Gidich (KAZ)	Jon Aberasturi (ESP)	Artem Tesler (UKR)

Tour of Iran (Azerbaijan) 2016, Stage 6: Northern Highway of Tabriz, Road 14 (Iran).

== Final standing ==
Final general classification (1–10)
Rank	Rider	Team	Time
1	Samad Pourseyedi (IRN)	Tabriz Shahrdari Team	24h 7' 46"
2	Ahad Kazemi (IRN)	Tabriz Shahrdari Team	1:45
3	Rahim Emami (IRN)	Pishgaman–Giant	2:22
4	Arvin Moazemi (IRN)	Pishgaman–Giant	2:28
5	Peter Koning (NED)	Drapac Professional Cycling	3:18
6	Ghader Mizbani (IRN)	Tabriz Shahrdari Team	3:19
7	Zhandos Bizhigitov (KAZ)	Vino 4ever SKO	5:02
8	Connor McCutcheon (USA)	Team Illuminate	6:08
9	Stefan Schumacher (GER)	Christina Jewelry Pro Cycling	6:38
10	Amir Kolahdozhagh (IRN)	Pishgaman–Giant	7:09
