= Hossein Alizadeh (cyclist) =

Iranian road bicycle racer

Personal information
- Full name: Hossein Alizadeh
- Born: 24 January 1988 (age 38) Tabriz, Iran
- Height: 182 cm (6 ft 0 in)
- Weight: 62 kg (137 lb)

Cycling career
- Sport: Cycling
- Discipline: Road
- Role: Rider
- Rider type: Climber

Amateur team
- 2024: Crown Tabriz Cycling Team

Professional teams
- 2009: Azad University Iran
- 2010–2012: Tabriz Petrochemical Team
- 2013: Amore & Vita
- 2014–2015: Tabriz Shahrdari Ranking
- 2015–2016: RTS–Santic Racing Team
- 2019–2020: Foolad Mobarakeh Sepahan
- 2022: Azad University Team
- 2023: Nusantara Cycling Team
- 2025: Sahand Pump Tabriz Crown

Major wins
- UCI Asia Tour (2011–12) Tour of Qinghai Lake (2012) National Road Race Championships (2012)

Hossein Alizadeh (born 24 January 1988) is an Iranian cyclist, who last rode for UCI Continental team Sahand Pump Tabriz Crown. A former national champion, Alizadeh is an extremely powerful climber and, at his best, matches the best time-trialists. He is both able to sustain a high intensity during long, steep climb and he is feared and famous in Asia tours for his explosive attacks that often leaves the front group split into pieces.

== Career ==
Born in Tabriz, Alizadeh took his first international stage win as well as the overall win in Tour de East Java in 2010. Then the same year in Tour of Qinghai Lake (2.HC) placed 2nd in mountain classification and ninth overall. In 2012, after winning the Tour of Qinghai Lake as well as the mountain classification, he won the 2011–12 UCI Asia Tour. Alizadeh, by moving from Tabriz Petrochemical Team to Italian-based Amore & Vita, was hopeful to race in Europe but due to the reason the team was registered from Ukraine, could not get the visa, so was not able to race in Europe tours.

== Major results ==
2007
7th Overall Taftan Tour
8th Overall Kerman Tour
2008
2nd Overall Taftan Tour
2nd Overall Milad De Nour Tour
2009
7th Overall Tour of Azerbaijan (Iran)
2010
1st Overall Tour de East Java

1st Stage 1

5th Overall International Presidency Tour
9th Overall Tour of Qinghai Lake
2011
1st Stage 3 (TTT) Tour of Azerbaijan (Iran)
2nd Overall Milad De Nour Tour
3rd Overall Tour de East Java
7th Overall International Presidency Tour
9th Overall Kerman Tour
2012
1st Overall 2011–12 UCI Asia Tour
1st Road race, National Road Championships
1st Overall Tour of Qinghai Lake

1st Mountains classification
1st Asian rider classification
1st Stage 3

8th Overall Tour of Azerbaijan (Iran)
2013
4th Overall Tour of Iran (Azerbaijan)
10th Overall Tour of Qinghai Lake
2014
4th Overall Tour de Singkarak

1st Stage 2

6th Overall Tour de Filipinas
2015
2nd Overall Tour of Qinghai Lake
10th Overall Tour of Iran (Azerbaijan)
2023
5th Road race, National Road Championships
2024
National Road Championships

2nd Road race
5th Time trial

6th Grand Prix Soğanlı
9th Grand Prix Kaisareia
2025
9th Grand Prix Kahramanmaraş
