= 2019 Tour of Iran (Azerbaijan) =

Tour of Iran (Azerbaijan) 2019
2019 UCI Asia Tour, race 34

Race details
- Dates: 2–6 October 2019
- Stages: 6
- Distance: 1,017.0 km (631.9 mi)

Tour of Iran (Azerbaijan) 2019 is a UCI 2.1 Asian Tour and the 34th edition of Tour of Iran (Azerbaijan). It was held in five stages in October 2019 in Iranian Azerbaijan. The race started in the city of Tabriz and went through Urmia, Jolfa, and Sarein ending at the Sahand Ski Resort.

== Stages ==
| Stage | Date | Start | Finish | Distance | 1st place | 2nd place | 3rd place |
|---|---|---|---|---|---|---|---|
| 1 | 2 October | Tabriz | Urmia | 162.4 km | Aleksandr Smirnov (RUS) | Youcef Reguigui (ALG) | Clint Hendricks (RSA) |
| 2 | 3 October | Urmia | Aras Free Zone in Jolfa | 209.4 km | Youcef Reguigui (ALG) | Clint Hendricks (RSA) | Mohammad Ganjkhanlou (IRI) |
| 3 | 4 October | Jolfa | Tabriz | 139.9 km | Savva Novikov (RUS) | Hamid Pourhashemi (IRI) | Cristian Raileanu (MLD) |
| 4 | 5 October | Tabriz | Sarein | 192.2 km | Igor Chzan (KAZ) | Savva Novikov (RUS) | Stanislau Bazhkou (BLR) |
| 5 | 6 October | Sareyn | Sahand Ski Resort | 180.7 km | Thomas Joseph (BEL) | Mohammad Ganjkhanlou (IRI) | Youcef Reguigui (ALG) |

== Final standing ==
Final general classification (1–3)
| Rank | Rider | Team | Time |
|---|---|---|---|
| 1 | Savva Novikov (RUS) | Lokosphinx | 21:30:23 |
| 2 | Cristian Raileanu (MLD) | Team Sapura Cycling | +0:24 |
| 3 | Youcef Reguigui (ALG) | Terengganu Inc. TSG Cycling Team | +0:26 |
