= Ramin Mehrabani =

Iranian cyclist (born 1986)

Personal information
- Full name: Ramin Mehrabani Azar
- Born: 18 February 1986 (age 40)

Cycling career
- Sport: Cycling
- Current team: Retired
- Discipline: Road
- Role: Rider

Professional teams
- 2009–2010: Azad University Iran
- 2011: Suren Cycling Team
- 2013: RTS–Santic Racing Team
- 2014–2015: Pishgaman Yazd

Ramin Mehrabani Azar (born 18 February 1986) is an Iranian former professional cyclist, who rode professionally between 2009 and 2015.

Mehrabani tested positive for metenolone at the 2011 International Presidency Tour and received a 2-year suspension until 29 June 2013.

== Major results ==
2008
5th Overall Milad De Nour Tour
8th Overall Taftan Tour
2009
1st Stage 6 Tour of Iran (Azerbaijan)
2nd Road race, National Road Championships
3rd Overall Milad De Nour Tour
2010
1st Overall Milad De Nour Tour

1st Stage 2

3rd Overall International Presidency Tour
9th Overall Tour de Singkarak
9th Overall Tour of Iran (Azerbaijan)
2011
3rd Melaka Governor's Cup
2013
5th Overall Tour of Fuzhou
6th Overall Tour of China I
6th Overall Tour de Ijen
2014
3rd Overall Tour de Singkarak

1st Mountains classification
1st Stage 3

3rd Overall Tour of Iran (Azerbaijan)
10th Overall Tour de East Java
2015
3rd Overall Tour of Iran (Azerbaijan)
6th Overall Tour de Singkarak
