= Behnam Maleki =

Iranian cyclist

Personal information
- Born: 2 December 1992 (age 33) Iran

Cycling career
- Sport: Cycling
- Current team: Retired
- Discipline: Road
- Role: Rider

Professional teams
- 2011: Azad University Iran
- 2013: Ayandeh Continental Team
- 2014–2015: Tabriz Petrochemical Team
- 2016: Tabriz Shahrdari Team
- 2017: Pishgaman Cycling Team
- 2018: Tabriz Shahrdary Team

Behnam Maleki (born 2 December 1992) is an Iranian former professional cyclist.

== Major results ==
2010
1st Road race, National Junior Road Championships
1st Overall Tour of Mazandaran

1st Stage 2

2014
3rd Road race, National Road Championships
2015
1st Road race, National Road Championships
1st Stage 5 Tour de Singkarak
8th Overall Tour of Yancheng Coastal Wetlands
