= Khalil Khorshid =

Iranian cyclist

Personal information
- Full name: Khalil Khorshid
- Born: 10 June 1988 (age 38) Tabriz, Iran

Cycling career
- Sport: Cycling
- Current team: Vride
- Discipline: Road
- Role: Rider

Amateur teams
- 2017: CISM Team
- 2024: Crown Tabriz Cycling Team

Professional teams
- 2014–2015: Tabriz Shahrdari Ranking
- 2016: RTS–Santic Racing Team
- 2017–2018: Tabriz Shahrdary Team
- 2018–2019: Yunnan Lvshan Landscape
- 2022–2023: Azad University Team
- 2025–: Vride

Khalil Khorshid (born 10 June 1988) is an Iranian cyclist, who currently rides for UCI Continental team Vride.

== Major results ==
2014
7th Overall Tour de Filipinas
2015
9th Overall Tour of Iran (Azerbaijan)
2017
1st Overall Tour de Singkarak

1st Mountains classification
1st Stage 8

2018
4th Road race, National Road Championships
2023
4th Road race, National Road Championships
7th Overall Tour of Van
2024
10th Grand Prix Kaisareia
