= 2017 Tour of Iran (Azerbaijan) =

Tour of Iran (Azerbaijan) 2017
2017 UCI Asia Tour, race 32

Race details
- Dates: October 8–13, 2017
- Stages: 6
- Distance: 1,017.0 km (631.9 mi)

Results
	Winner	Rob Ruijgh (NED)	(Tarteletto–Isorex)
	Second	Ilya Davidenok (KAZ)	(Tabriz Shahrdary Team)
	Third	Nicola Toffali (ITA)	(0711 / Cycling)

Tour of Iran (Azerbaijan) 2017 was a UCI 2.1 Asian Tour stage race and the 32nd edition of Tour of Iran (Azerbaijan) which took place across six stages October 8–13, 2017 in Iranian Azerbaijan. The total length of the tour was 1,017.0 km with its route passing through Tabriz, Urmia, Jolfa, Sarein, and Sahand Ski Resort. A total of 14 Iranian and International teams participated in this edition of the tour.

== Participant teams ==
UCI Professional Continental Teams
UCI Continental Teams Australia Drapac–Pat's Veg Iran Pishgaman Cycling Team Iran Tabriz Shahrdary Team Germany 0711 / Cycling Kuwait Kuwait–Cartucho.es	Belgium Tarteletto–Isorex Japan Kinan Cycling Team Kazakhstan Vino–Astana Motors Netherlands Baby-Dump Cyclingteam Iran Sepahan Cycling Team	Bahrain VIB Bikes Japan Bridgestone–Anchor Kazakhstan Vino–Astana Motors
National teams Iran		Syria

== Stages of the Tour ==
Stage	Date	Start	Finish	Distance	1st place	2nd place	3rd place
1	8 October	Tabriz	Urmia	162.4 km	Koos Jeroen Kers (NED)	Liam White (AUS)	Nikita Sokolov (KAZ)
2	9 October	Urmia	Aras Free Zone in Jolfa	209.4 km	Alexey Voloshin (KAZ)	Rob Ruijgh (NED)	Ilya Davidenok (KAZ)
3	10 October	Jolfa	Tabriz	139.9 km	Saeid Safarzadeh (IRN)	Theodore Yates (AUS)	Mohammad Ganjkhanlou (IRN)
4	11 October	Tabriz	Sarein	192.2 km	Amir Kolahdozhagh (IRN)	Thomas Lebas (FRA)	Rob Ruijgh (NED)
5	12 October	Sareyn	Sahand Ski Resort	180.7 km	Davide Rebellin (ITA)	Nicola Toffali (ITA)	Mohammad Ganjkhanlou (IRN)
6	13 October	Tabriz	Tabriz	114 km	Theodore Yates (AUS)	Mohammad Ganjkhanlou (IRN)	Marco Doets (NED)

== Final Standing ==
Final general classification (1–3)
Rank	Rider	Team	Time
1	Rob Ruijgh	Crelan–Vastgoedservice	23:11:31
2	Ilya Davidenok	Tabriz Shahrdari Team	0:04
3	Nicola Toffali	0711 / Cycling	0:07
