= Amir Kolahdouz =

Iranian cyclist (born 1993)

Personal information
- Full name: Amir Kolahdouz Hagh
- Born: 7 January 1993 (age 33) Tabriz, Iran
- Height: 1.71 m (5 ft 7 in)
- Weight: 60 kg (132 lb)

Cycling career
- Sport: Cycling
- Discipline: Road
- Role: Rider
- Rider type: Climber

Professional teams
- 2012–2015: Tabriz Petrochemical Team
- 2016–2018: Pishgaman–Giant
- 2019: Taiyuan Miogee Cycling Team
- 2020: Ningxia Sports Lottery Continental Team
- 2022–2023: Azad University Team
- 2024: Shenzhen Xidesheng Cycling Team

Amir Kolahdouz Hagh (born 7 January 1993) is an Iranian cyclist, who last rode for UCI Continental team Shenzhen Xidesheng Cycling Team.

== Major results ==
2011
1st Time trial, Asian Junior Road Championships
1st Overall Mazandaran Tour

1st Stage 4

2012
1st Mountains classification Tour of Azerbaijan
2013
2nd Overall Tour de Filipinas

1st Young rider classification

3rd Road race, National Under-23 Road Championships
3rd Overall Tour of Iran (Azerbaijan)
3rd Overall Tour de Singkarak

1st Mountains classification
1st Stage 5

10th Overall Tour de Langkawi
2014
2nd Road race, National Road Championships
2nd Overall Tour of Fuzhou
3rd Overall Tour de East Java
5th Overall Tour of Iran
5th Overall Tour de Ijen
7th Overall Tour of Japan
2015
1st Road race, National Under-23 Road Championships
Asian Under-23 Road Championships

2nd Time trial
6th Road race

4th Overall Tour of Fuzhou
5th Overall Tour de Singkarak

1st Stage 4

5th Overall Tour of Iran
7th Overall Tour de Filipinas
2016
1st Overall Tour de Singkarak

1st Points classification
1st Mountains classification
1st Stage 4

2nd Overall Jelajah Malaysia

1st Mountains classification

5th Overall Tour de Taiwan
6th Overall Tour of Fuzhou
8th Overall Tour of Japan
8th Overall Tour of Qinghai Lake
10th Overall Tour of Iran
2017
1st Mountains classification Tour of Xingtai
2nd Overall Tour de Ijen

1st Mountains classification
1st Stage 3

9th Overall Tour of Iran (Azerbaijan)

1st Stage 4

2018
10th Overall Tour de Filipinas
2019
2nd Overall Tour of Xingtai

1st Stage 1

3rd Road race, National Road Championships
10th Overall Tour de Indonesia
2022
4th Time trial, National Road Championships
