= Patrick Bevin =

New Zealand cyclist (born 1991)

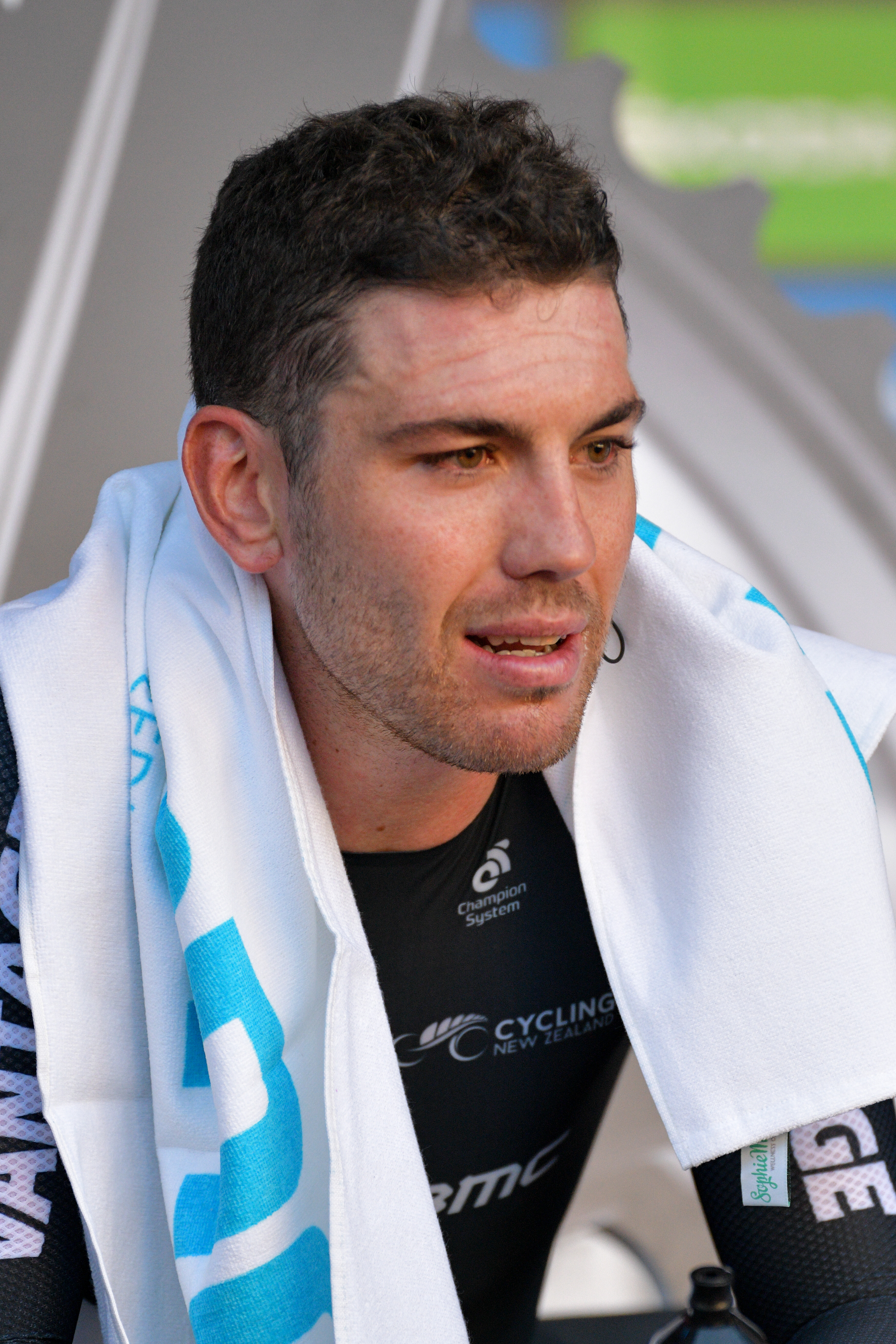
- Bevin in 2018

Personal information
- Full name: Patrick Bevin
- Nickname: Paddy
- Born: 15 February 1991 (age 35) Taupō, New Zealand
- Height: 1.80 m (5 ft 11 in)
- Weight: 75 kg (165 lb)

Cycling career
- Sport: Cycling
- Discipline: Road
- Role: Rider

Amateur teams
- 2009: Bici Vida
- 2010: Rubicon Orbea

Professional teams
- 2010–2013: Bissell
- 2014: Search2retain–Health.com.au
- 2015: Avanti Racing Team
- 2016–2017: Cannondale
- 2018–2020: BMC Racing Team
- 2021–2022: Israel Start-Up Nation
- 2023–2024: Team DSM

Major wins
- Grand Tours Tour de France 1 TTT stage (2018) Stage races Tour of Turkey (2022) One-day races and Classics National Time Trial Championships (2016, 2019)

Patrick Bevin (born 15 February 1991) is a New Zealand former professional road racing cyclist, who last rode the 2024 season for UCI WorldTeam Team dsm–firmenich PostNL.

== Personal life ==
Bevin grew up in Taupō. He moved to Cambridge in 2014 when the Avantidrome opened to train with the High Performance team of BikeNZ.

== Career ==
In 2009, Bevin rode for the New Zealand Bici Vida team. During this time, he won two stage victories in the 2009 Tour of Southland and victory in the Oceania Cycling Championships road race. He was the Bike New Zealand Junior Road Cyclist of the Year. Bevin then moved to the United States and briefly raced for the Rubicon–Orbea development team, with significant success, and was noticed by Bissell, an American Continental-level team. Bevin rode for Bissell until the team ended at the end of the 2013 season. During this time, he won several criterium races and victory in the 2012 Bucks County Classic. Throughout the 2014 season, he rode for the Australian team Search2retain–Health.com.au, winning the National Capital Tour and earning himself a contract with Avanti Racing Team for 2015. In 2014, he also rode for the New Zealand national team at the 2014 An Post Rás, where he won two stages and the points competition and briefly led the general classification.

In 2015, now riding for Avanti, Bevin came third in the New Zealand National Time Trial Championships and sixth in the New Zealand National Road Race Championships. After finishing 13th in the Cadel Evans Great Ocean Road Race, he rode in the 2015 Herald Sun Tour. In this race, he finished in the top 10 in three stages, including victory on the final stage (his first professional-level win) at Arthurs Seat. He came second overall in the race, 11 seconds behind Cameron Meyer (Orica–GreenEDGE). His next race was The REV Classic in New Zealand, Bevin's home race and newly promoted to 1.2 status; Bevin won the race in a three-man sprint.

Bevin then travelled to Taiwan to compete in the 2.1-ranked 2015 Tour de Taiwan. In the second stage, he won the hill-top finish ahead of Hossein Askari and took the race lead. After losing the lead to Samad Pourseyedi (Tabriz Petrochemical Team) the following day, Bevin finished fourth overall and won the points classification, having finished in the top ten in four of the five stages. His next professional race was the Tour de Korea. Bevin finished first on stage 4 (beating Caleb Ewan in the sprint) and second on five others. He also finished second in both the general and the points classifications.

In August 2015, it was announced that Bevin had signed a two-year contract to ride in the UCI World Tour for Cannondale, with Jonathan Vaughters describing him as "a rider who seems to have it all".

He was named in the startlist for the 2016 Vuelta a España. In June 2017, he was named in the startlist for the 2017 Tour de France.

In August 2020, it was announced that Bevin was to join Israel Start-Up Nation from the 2021 season, on a two-year contract.

In 2022 he won stage seven and the overall classification at the Presidential Tour of Turkey, and won stage three of the Tour de Romandie

He signed a three-year contract with TeamDSM starting in 2023, but announced his retirement from professional cycling at the end of the 2024 season.

== Major results ==
2009
1st Road race, Oceania Junior Road Championships
Tour of Southland

1st Stages 4 & 7

2010
1st The REV Classic
4th Overall Tour de Vineyards

1st Stages 1 & 2

2011
1st Overall Tour de Vineyards

1st Stage 1

2nd Overall Tour of Southland

1st Stage 8

2012
1st Bucks County Classic
2nd Overall Redlands Bicycle Classic

1st Stages 1, 2 & 3

3rd Road race, National Road Championships
4th Overall New Zealand Cycle Classic
2014
1st Overall Tour of Tasmania
1st The REV Classic
An Post Rás

1st Points classification
1st Stages 2 & 4

2015 (3 pro wins)
1st The REV Classic
2nd Overall Herald Sun Tour

1st Stage 4

2nd Overall Tour de Korea

1st Stage 4

3rd Time trial, National Road Championships
4th Time trial, Oceania Road Championships
4th Overall Tour de Taiwan

1st Points classification
1st Stage 2

2016 (1)
1st Time trial, National Road Championships
5th Overall Czech Cycling Tour

1st Stage 1 (TTT)

10th Overall Tour Down Under
10th Overall Tour du Haut Var
2017
6th Overall Tour of Norway
2018
1st Stage 3 (TTT) Tour de France
1st Stage 1 (TTT) Tirreno–Adriatico
UCI Road World Championships

3rd Team time trial
8th Time trial

4th Overall Tour of Britain

1st Points classification

9th Overall Tour de Yorkshire
2019 (2)
National Road Championships

1st Time trial
5th Road race

Tour Down Under

1st Sprints classification
1st Stage 2

4th Time trial, UCI Road World Championships
2021
10th Time trial, Olympic Games
2022 (3)
1st Overall Tour of Turkey

1st Stage 7

1st Stage 3 Tour de Romandie

=== Grand Tour general classification results timeline ===
Grand Tour	2016	2017	2018	2019	2020	2021
Giro d'Italia	—	—	—	—	—	48
Tour de France	—	114	DNF	DNF	—	—
Vuelta a España	DNF	—	—	DNF	—	—

Legend
—	Did not compete
DNF	Did not finish
