= Hamid Pourhashemi =

Iranian cyclist

Hamid Pourhashem
Personal information
- Full name: Hamid Pourhashem
- Born: 3 June 1990 (age 36) Tabriz, Iran

Cycling career
- Sport: Cycling
- Discipline: Road
- Role: Rider

Professional teams
- 2014–2015: Tabriz Shahrdari Ranking
- 2016: Tabriz Petrochemical CCN Team
- 2016: Pishgaman–Giant
- 2017–2018: Tabriz Shahrdary Team
- 2018–2019: Yunnan Lvshan Landscape
- 2020: Ningxia Sports Lottery Continental Team

Hamid Pourhashemi (born 3 June 1990) is an Iranian cyclist, who most recently rode for UCI Continental team Ningxia Sports Lottery Continental Team.

== Major results ==
2016
3rd Overall Tour of Fuzhou

1st Stage 1

10th Tour of Almaty
2017
1st Mountains classification Tour de Kumano
3rd Overall Tour of Japan
2018
1st Stage 3 Tour of Mesopotamia
