= Samad Pourseyedi =

Iranian cyclist (born 1985)

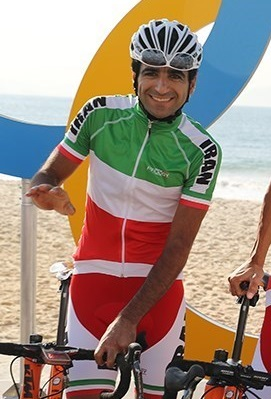
- Pourseyedi during 2016 Summer Olympics

Personal information
- Full name: Mirsamad Pourseyedi Golakhour
- Born: October 15, 1985 (age 41) Tabriz, Iran

Cycling career
- Sport: Cycling
- Current team: Retired
- Discipline: Road
- Role: Rider
- Rider type: Climber

Professional teams
- 2008–2009: Islamic Azad University Cycling Team
- 2009–2010: Tabriz Petrochemical Team
- 2011: Azad University Iran
- 2013–2015: Tabriz Petrochemical Team
- 2016–2017: Tabriz Shahrdari Team
- 2019: Omidnia Mashhad Team
- 2020–2021: Foolad Mobarakeh Sepahan
- 2022: Azad University Team

Major wins
- Stage races Tour of Japan (2014, 2015) Tour of Qinghai Lake (2013) Tour de Langkawi (2014) Tour of Azerbaijan (Iran) (2015, 2016) Tour de Taiwan (2015) Other UCI Asia Tour (2013–14, 2015)
Medal record
Representing Iran
Men's road bicycle racing
Asian Championships
Silver medal – second place	2018 Naypyidaw	Team time trial
Bronze medal – third place	2022 Dushanbe	Team time trial

Mirsamad Pourseyedi Golakhour (Persian: میرصمد پورسیدی; born 15 October 1985) is an Iranian former cyclist who competed as a professional from 2008 to 2022.

== Doping ban ==
He was suspended from 25 May 2011 to 29 June 2013 because of testing positive for the use of erythropoietin (EPO) during the Tour of Iran in 2011. Upon his return to competition, he won the Tour of Qinghai Lake.

== Major results ==
2007
1st Stage 3 Taftan Tour
4th Overall Tour of Azerbaijan (Iran)
9th Overall Kerman Tour
2008
4th Road race, National Road Championships
4th Overall Tour of Azerbaijan (Iran)
6th Overall Milad De Nour Tour
2009
7th Overall Milad De Nour Tour

1st Stage 3

2010
2nd Overall International Presidency Tour
6th Overall Tour de Singkarak

1st Stage 1 (TTT)

2011
1st Overall International Presidency Tour
2nd Overall Kerman Tour
3rd Road race, National Road Championships
3rd Overall Tour de Singkarak

1st Stages 3, 6b & 7a

10th Overall Tour de Filipinas

1st Stage 3

2013
1st Overall Tour of Qinghai Lake

1st Mountains classification
1st Stage 3

1st Overall Tour de Ijen

1st Stage 2

2nd Overall Tour of Borneo
2014
1st 2013–14 UCI Asia Tour
1st Overall Tour de Langkawi

1st Asian rider classification
1st Stage 4

1st Overall Tour of Japan

1st Stage 4

1st Overall Tour of Fuzhou

1st Stage 2

2nd Overall Tour of Iran (Azerbaijan)
6th Overall Tour de Ijen
10th Overall Tour of Qinghai Lake
2015
1st UCI Asia Tour
1st Overall Tour de Taiwan

1st Mountains classification
1st Asian rider classification
1st Stage 4

1st Overall Tour of Japan
1st Overall Tour of Iran (Azerbaijan)

1st Asian rider classification
1st Stage 5

4th Time trial, National Road Championships
4th Overall Tour de Filipinas

1st Stage 4

7th Overall Tour of Fuzhou
2016
1st Overall Tour of Iran (Azerbaijan)

1st Points classification
1st Mountains classification
1st Asian rider classification
1st Stage 4

2nd Time trial, National Road Championships
3rd Overall Tour of Japan

1st Mountains classification

9th Overall Tour de Taiwan
10th Road race, Asian Road Championships
2017
National Road Championships

1st Time trial
5th Road race

Asian Road Championships

4th Team time trial
10th Time trial

5th Overall Tour de Kumano
8th Overall Tour of Almaty
9th Overall Tour of Japan
2018
1st Time trial, National Road Championships
2nd Team time trial, Asian Road Championships
2019
3rd Overall Tour de Singkarak
2022
Asian Cycling Championships

3rd Team time trial
6th Time trial
