= Koos Jeroen Kers =

Dutch cyclist (born 1986)

Personal information
- Born: 11 October 1986 (age 40) Amstelveen, Netherlands

Cycling career
- Sport: Cycling
- Current team: TWC de Kempen
- Discipline: Road
- Role: Rider

Amateur teams
- 2005: Rietveld–WTC
- 2006–2008: Ruiter–Dakkapellen
- 2009–2010: Grontmij–Amsterdam
- 2011: WTC de Amstel
- 2012–2014: Baby-Dump–Lemmerns–Wilvo
- 2018–2021: WP Groot Amsterdam
- 2022–: TWC de Kempen

Professional team
- 2015–2017: Baby-Dump Cyclingteam

Koos Jeroen Kers (born 11 October 1986) is a Dutch racing cyclist, who currently rides for Dutch amateur team TWC de Kempen.

He won the first stage of the 2017 Tour of Iran (Azerbaijan). This win made him the general classification leader, but he lost the lead on the next stage. He also had top-ten finishes on the third and sixth stages. The first stage win was his first professional victory, and the second year in a row a Dutchman won a stage of the Tour of Azerbaijan (Iran).

== Major results ==
2011
7th Grand prix de Khouribga, Challenge des phosphates
2012
3rd Overall Tour of Fuzhou
5th Overall Tour de Filipinas
5th Overall Grand Prix Chantal Biya
2013
3rd Overall Tour of Fuzhou
5th Tour de Okinawa
2015
3rd Omloop der Kempen
4th Parel van de Veluwe
8th Overall Tour of Al Zubarah
2017
1st Stage 1 Tour of Iran (Azerbaijan)
2nd Tour de Okinawa
2018
3rd Rutland–Melton CiCLE Classic
5th Overall Grand Prix Chantal Biya
