= Tino Thömel =

German cyclist

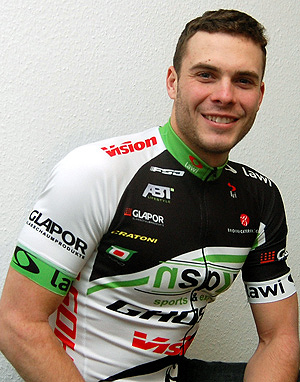
- Thömel in 2013

Personal information
- Full name: Tino Thömel
- Born: June 6, 1988 (age 38)

Cycling career
- Sport: Cycling
- Discipline: Road
- Role: Rider (retired); Directeur sportif
- Rider type: Sprinter

Amateur teams
- 2004–2010: BSV AdW Berlin
- 2006–2010: KED-Junior-Team Berlin

Professional teams
- 2011: Geox–TMC
- 2011–2013: Team NSP
- 2014: Team Stuttgart
- 2015–2016: RTS–Santic Racing Team
- 2017–2018: Bike Aid

Managerial team
- 2020–2021: Bike Aid

Tino Thömel (born 6 June 1988) is a German former professional road cyclist, who most recently worked as a directeur sportif for UCI Continental team Bike Aid.

Thömel had eight professional wins in his career, as well as several more at lower levels. Three of his wins came in the Szlakiem Grodów Piastowskich cycling race in Poland, with one stage win each in 2011, 2012 and 2013. He also won a stage of the 2014 Tour of China and a stage of the 2015 Tour de Taiwan.

== Major results ==
2009
8th Overall Tour de Berlin
2010
1st Rund um den Finanzplatz Eschborn-Frankfurt U23
Tour of Alanya

1st Stages 1 & 4

3rd Overall Tour du Loir-et-Cher
3rd Overall Tour de Berlin

1st Stages 1 (TTT) & 2

2011
1st Stage 3 Szlakiem Grodów Piastowskich
Tour of Greece

1st Stages 1 & 6

1st Stage 1 Oberösterreich Rundfahrt
1st Stage 8 Tour de Normandie
5th Neuseen Classics
10th ProRace Berlin
2012
1st Stage 3 Szlakiem Grodów Piastowskich
2nd Gooikse Pijl
3rd Kernen Omloop Echt-Susteren
4th De Kustpijl
2013
1st Overall Tour du Loir-et-Cher

1st Stages 1, 3 & 5

1st Stage 3 Szlakiem Grodów Piastowskich
1st Stage 6 Tour de Normandie
2nd Kernen Omloop Echt-Susteren
10th Ster van Zwolle
2014
1st Stage 6 Tour of China I
5th Arno Wallaard Memorial
8th Overall Tour of China II
2015
1st Stage 5 Tour de Taiwan
1st Stage 8 Tour de Korea
1st Stage 7 Tour of Hainan
9th Overall Tour of Yancheng Coastal Wetlands

1st Stage 2

2016
1st Stage 2 Tour of China II
2017
1st Stage 3 Tour of Ukraine
