= The REV Classic =

New Zealand one-day road cycling race

Race details
- Date: February
- Region: New Zealand
- Discipline: Road
- Competition: UCI Oceania Tour
- Type: One-day
- Web site: www.therev.co.nz

History
- First edition: 2006
- Editions: 11 (as of 2016)
- Final edition: 2016
- First winner: Geoff Burndred (NZL)
- Most wins: Patrick Bevin (NZL) (3 wins)
- Final winner: Dion Smith (NZL)

The REV Classic was an annual professional one-day road bicycle racing for men. The race was ridden as a UCI 1.2 category race. In 2017 the race was postponed with the intention of resuming the race in 2018, however that has not occurred.

== Winners ==
Year	Country	Rider	Team
2006	New Zealand	Geoff Burndred	
2007	New Zealand	Geoff Burndred	
2008	New Zealand	Gordon McCauley	
2009	New Zealand	Gordon McCauley	
2010	New Zealand	Patrick Bevin	
2011	New Zealand	Scott Lyttle	
2012	New Zealand	Jeremy Vennell	
2013	New Zealand	Shem Rodger	
2014	New Zealand	Patrick Bevin	Search2retain–Health.com.au
2015	New Zealand	Patrick Bevin	Avanti Racing Team
2016	New Zealand	Dion Smith	ONE Pro Cycling
