= 2012 Tour de Singkarak =

UCI Asia Tour

Race details
- Dates: 4–10 June
- Stages: 7
- Distance: 854 km (531 mi)

The 2012 Tour de Singkarak was the 4th edition of the Tour de Singkarak, one of Indonesian official tournament series of Union Cycliste International (UCI). It started on 4 June in Sawahlunto and ended in the Padang on 10 June. Like previous edition, the international cyclists competed in 7 stages over 7 days, which the routes has been surveyed by Amaury Sport Organization which surveyed also Tour de France routes. Covering a distance of 854 kilometres with prize money total to IDR 1 billion. The route across Lake Singkarak on stage 2 and stage 5.

Starting in Sawahlunto and finishing in provincial capital Padang, the race visited 14 regencies and cities in the West Sumatra: Sawahlunto, Payakumbuh, Lima Puluh Kota, Sijunjung, Tanah Datar, Padang Panjang, Pariaman, Agam, Solok, Solok Regency, Pariaman, Pesisir Selatan, and Padang.

== Difference ==
Different from organization of the Tour de Singkarak in previous years which always start from the city of Padang, this year's Tour de Singkarak actually began in Sawahlunto, one of the best old city in Indonesia. While the city of Padang as the capital of West Sumatra, as a finish place Tour de Singkarak, after previously placed in Lake Singkarak. However, Lake Singkarak and other famous objects remain a part of this year trajectory pathway, which length is 854 km. These differences occurred caused this championship has cooperated with the Amaury Sport Organization or ASO, organizers of the Tour de France in France.

== Teams ==
As of 29 May 2012:

- (Taiwan) Action Cycling Team
- (Japan) Aisan Racing Team
- (Australia) Australian National Team
- (Iran) Azad University Cross Team
- (Brunei) CCN Cycling Team
- (New Zealand) Colossi Miche Team
- (Australia) Eddy Hollands Bicycle Services
- (Australia) Genesis Wealth Advisers Pro
- (Netherlands) Global Cycling Team
- Japan Cycling Federation
- (Iran) Mess Kerman Cycling Team
- OCBC Singapore Continental
- (Australia) Plan B Racing Team
- (France) Reine Blanche
- (Malaysia) Trengganu Pro
- Uzbekistan Suren Team
- (Indonesia) Binong Baru Pesisir Selatan
- (Indonesia) Cikeas Cycling Team
- (Indonesia) Custom Cycling Club
- (Indonesia) Pengprov ISSI Sumatera Barat
- (Indonesia) Polygon Sweet Nice
- (Indonesia) PSN Gillas
- (Indonesia) Putra Perjuangan
- (Indonesia) Wimcycle Araya
- (Indonesia) WPS Management Jogja

== Stages ==
List of stages
Stage	Date	Course	Distance	Winner
1	4 June	Sawahlunto — Muaro Sijunjung — Sawahlunto	77.5 km (48 mi)	(Japan) Ito Masakazu
2	5 June	Sawahlunto — Harau Valley, Payakumbuh	124.5 km (77 mi)	(Taiwan) Shihhsin Hsiao
3	6 June	Payakumbuh — Pagaruyung Palace, Batusangkar	102 km (63 mi)	(Iran) Pujol Munoz Oscar
4	7 June	Pagaruyung — Malibo Anai — Kelok 44— Bukittinggi	157.5 km (98 mi)	(Brunei) John Ebsen
5	8 June	Padang Panjang — Solok	149 km (93 mi)	(Uzbekistan) Hamid Shirisisan
6	9 June	Gandoriah Beach, Pariaman — Painan, Pesisir Selatan	146 km (91 mi)	
7	10 June	Padang	99.5 km (62 mi)	
