= Arvin Moazzami =

Iranian-Canadian cyclist (born 1990)

Arvin Moazami Godarzi
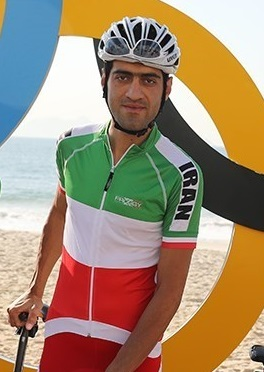
- Moazami in 2016

Personal information
- Full name: Arvin Moazami Godarzi
- Born: 26 March 1990 (age 36) Borujerd, Iran
- Height: 1.84 m (6 ft 0 in)
- Weight: 70 kg (154 lb)

Cycling career
- Sport: Cycling
- Discipline: Road
- Role: Rider

Amateur team
- 2019: NCCH Elite p/b MGCC

Professional teams
- 2009–2011: Tabriz Petrochemical Team
- 2012–2013: Azad University Cross Team
- 2013: Ayandeh Continental Team
- 2014–2018: Pishgaman Yazd
- 2020–2021: XSpeed United Continental
Medal record
Representing Iran
Men's road cycling
Asian Games
Silver medal – second place	2014 Incheon	Road Race
Asian Championships
Silver medal – second place	2013 New Delhi	Road race
Silver medal – second place	2018 Naypyidaw	Team time trial
Bronze medal – third place	2018 Naypyidaw	Individual time trial

Arvin Moazami Godarzi (Persian: آروین معظمی گودرزی; born 26 March 1990) is an Iranian-Canadian cyclist, who last rode for UCI Continental team XSpeed United Continental.

== Major results ==
2009
1st Stage 1 Milad De Nour Tour
2nd Team pursuit, Asian Track Championships
4th Road race, Iranian National Road Championships
2010
3rd Road race, Iranian National Road Championships
3rd Overall Milad De Nour Tour
2011
2nd Scratch, Asian Track Championships
2012
Asian Under-23 Road Championships

1st Time trial
3rd Road race

Iranian National Road Championships

4th Time Trial
5th Road race

2013
2nd Road race, Asian Road Championships
Iranian National Road Championships

4th Time Trial
6th Road race

6th Overall Tour of Iran
2014
2nd Road race, Asian Games
4th Overall Tour of Iran
5th Overall Tour de Singkarak
6th Overall Tour de East Java
6th Time Trial, Iranian National Road Championships
2015
1st Overall Tour de Singkarak

1st Mountains classification

2nd Madison, Asian Track Championships
Iranian National Road Championships

3rd Road race
3rd Time trial

6th Overall Tour of Fuzhou
8th Road race, Asian Road Championships
2016
Iranian National Road Championships

1st Time trial
2nd Road race

1st Overall Jelajah Malaysia

1st Stage 2

1st Overall Tour of Fuzhou

1st Stage 1

3rd Overall Tour of Iran
7th Tour of Almaty
2017
2nd Overall Tour de Flores

1st Stage 3

9th Overall Tour of Xingtai
10th Overall Tour de Ijen

1st Stage 4

2018
2nd Scratch, Asian Track Championships
Asian Road Championships

2nd Team time trial
3rd Time trial

6th Time trial, Asian Games
