= Alexandr Shushemoin =

Kazakh cyclist

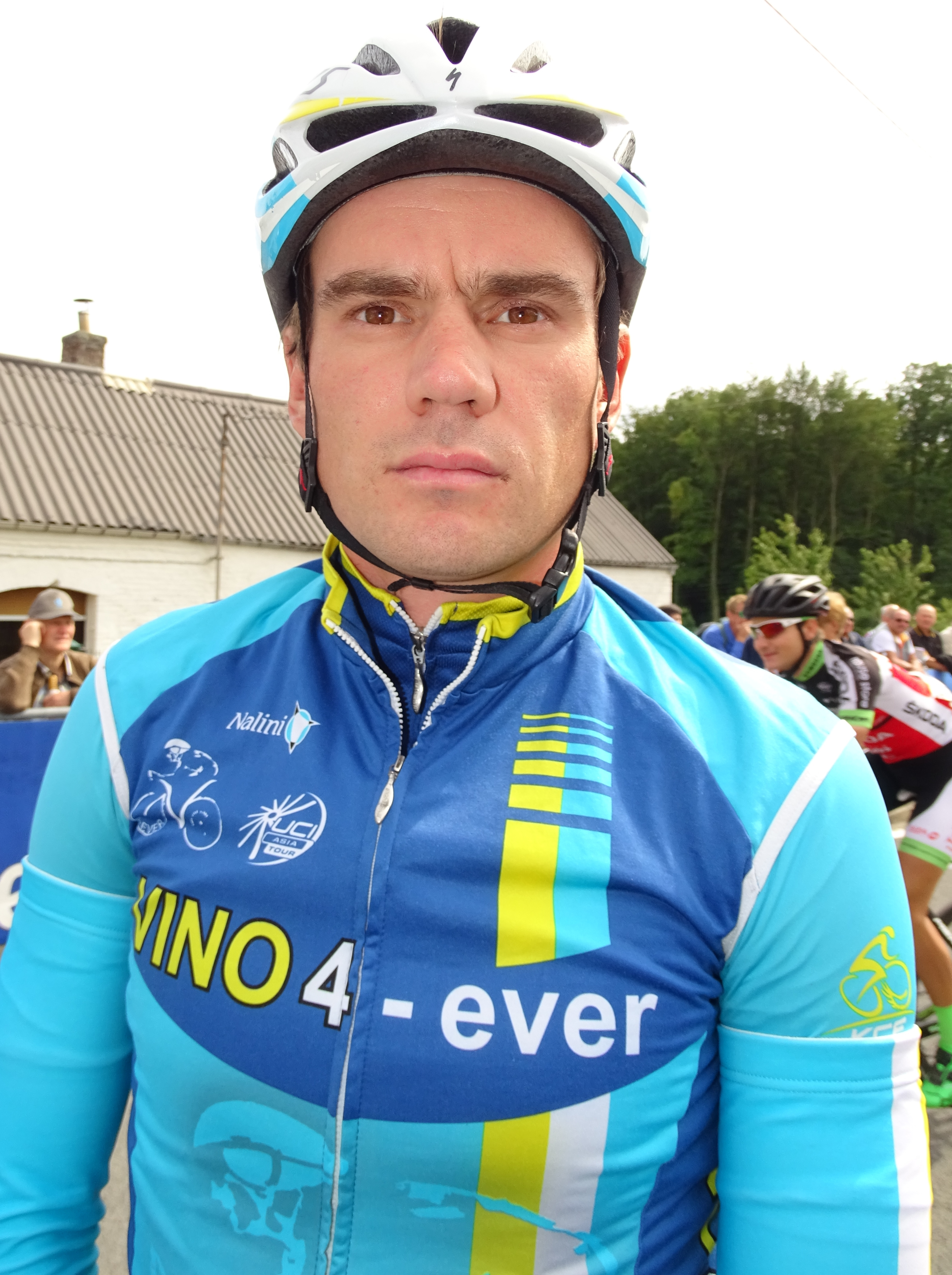
- Shushemoin in August 2015

Personal information
- Full name: Alexandr Shushemoin
- Born: 26 February 1987 (age 39) Petropavl, Kazakh SSR, Soviet Union (now Kazakhstan)
- Height: 1.76 m (5 ft 9 in)
- Weight: 62 kg (137 lb)

Cycling career
- Sport: Cycling
- Current team: XDS Astana Development Team
- Discipline: Road
- Role: Rider (retired); Directeur sportif

Professional teams
- 2008: Ulan
- 2011: Astana (stagiaire)
- 2012–2013: Continental Team Astana
- 2014–2016: Vino 4ever
- 2017: Attaque Team Gusto

Managerial teams
- 2018–2021: Vino–Astana Motors
- 2022–: Astana Qazaqstan Development Team

Alexandr Shushemoin (born 26 February 1987) is a Kazakhstani former professional racing cyclist, who now works as a directeur sportif for UCI Continental team XDS Astana Development Team. He rode in the men's team time trial at the 2015 UCI Road World Championships.

== Major results ==
2006
1st Prologue Way to Pekin
2009
7th Overall The Paths of King Nikola
2010
2nd Gara Ciclistica Montappone
3rd Overall Tour of Japan
5th Overall The Paths of King Nikola
5th Overall Tour de Kumano
7th Overall Tour de Langkawi
9th Road race, Asian Road Championships
2011
2nd Road race, National Road Championships
2012
8th Giro del Veneto
10th Coppa della Pace
2013
1st Mountains classification Tour of Bulgaria
8th Mayor Cup
2014
2nd Road race, National Road Championships
4th Overall Tour of Szeklerland

1st Mountains classification

2015
1st Stage 1 Tour of Iran (Azerbaijan)
6th Overall Tour of Thailand
9th Overall Grand Prix of Adygeya
9th Memorial Oleg Dyachenko
10th Overall Tour d'Azerbaïdjan
2016
2nd Road race, National Road Championships
2nd Overall Tour of Szeklerland
5th Overall Tour de Korea
10th Overall Tour of Thailand
