= Satalyst Verve Racing Team =

Australian cycling team

Team information
- UCI code: NSR
- Registered: Australia
- Founded: 2008
- Disbanded: 2018
- Discipline: Road
- Status: UCI Continental
- Bicycles: Giant
- Website: Team home page

Key personnel
- General manager: Wayne Evans

Team name history
- 2008–2013; 2014; 2015; 2016–2018: Plan B Racing; Satalyst Giant Racing Team; Navitas–Satalyst Racing Team; Satalyst Verve Racing Team

Satalyst Verve Racing Team was an Australian UCI Continental cycling team, that competed between 2008 and 2018.

== Major wins ==
2015
Stage 6 Tour of Iran (Azerbaijan), Theodore Yates
