= Nicola Toffali =

Italian cyclist

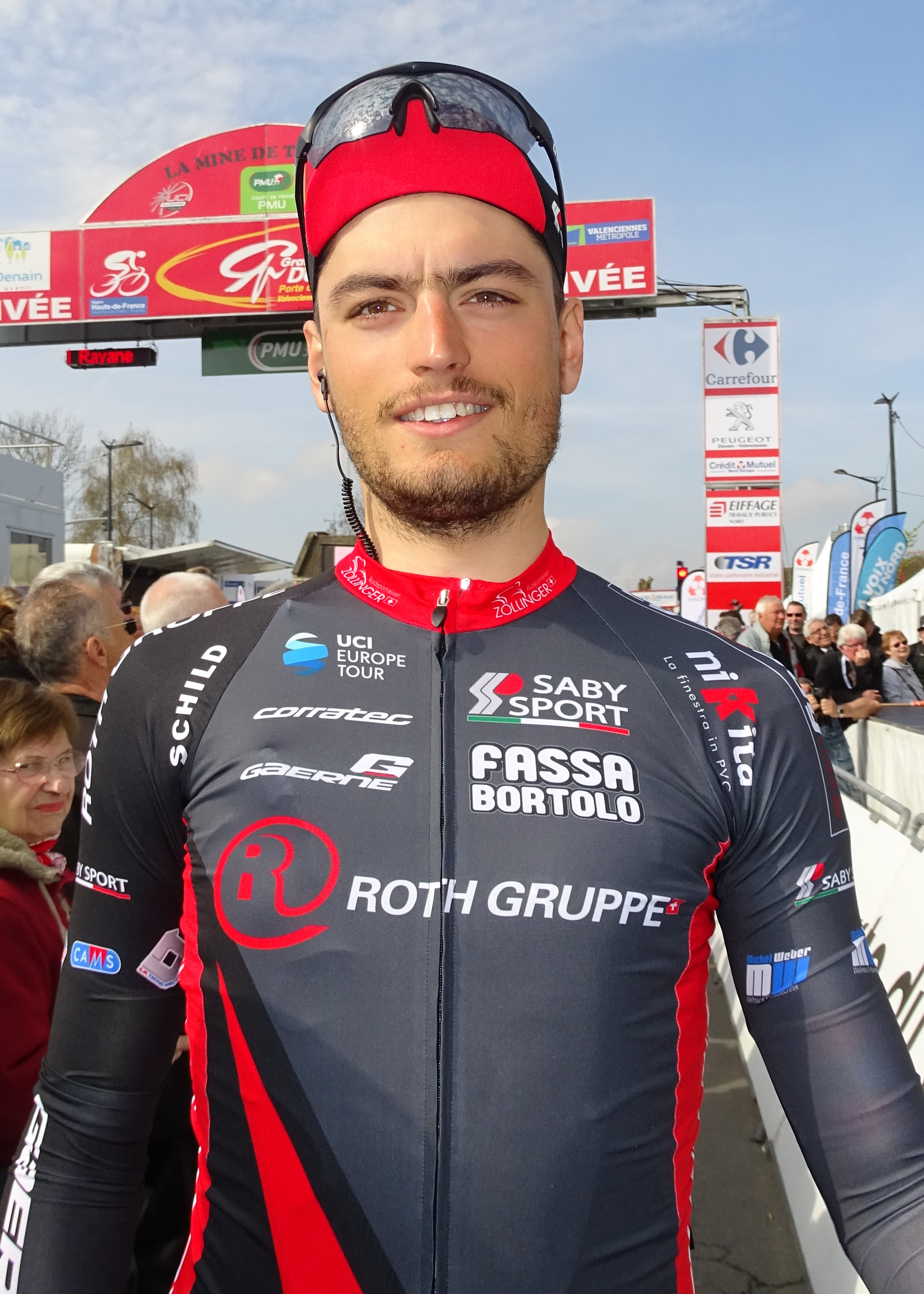

Personal information
- Born: 20 October 1992 (age 33) Verona, Italy

Cycling career
- Sport: Cycling
- Current team: 0711 / Cycling
- Discipline: Road
- Role: Rider
- Rider type: Rouleur

Amateur teams
- 2012-2013: General Store-Mantovani-Fontana
- 2014-2015: G.S. Zalf-Euromobil-Désirée-Fior

Professional teams
- 2016: Team Roth
- 2017: 0711 / Cycling

Nicola Toffali (born 20 October 1992 in Verona) is an Italian racing cyclist. In March 2017 0711 / Cycling announced that they had signed Toffali.

== Major results ==
2009
1st Stage 4 3 Giorni Orobica
2010
1st Piccola Tre Valli Varesine
2012
3rd Memorial Elia Da Re
2014
1st Memorial Gianni Biz
1st Alta Padovana Tour
1st GP Bianco di Custoza
1st Coppa San Vito
4th Coppa Ardigò
5th Parma-La Spezia
2015
1st Coppa Collecchio
1st Memorial Carlo Valentini
2nd Memorial Denis Zanette e Daniele Del Ben
5th Memorial Vincenzo Mantovani
5th Gran Premio Città di Vigonza
2017
3rd Overall Tour of Iran (Azerbaijan)
6th Trofeo Matteotti
6th Circuit de Wallonie
10th Münsterland Giro
