= Rahim Emami =

Iranian cyclist

Personal information
- Full name: Rahim Emami
- Born: 17 May 1982 (age 44) Tabriz, Iran

Cycling career
- Sport: Cycling
- Current team: Suspended
- Discipline: Road
- Role: Rider

Professional teams
- 2008: Tabriz Petrochemical Team
- 2010: Giant Asia Racing Team
- 2011: Azad University Iran
- 2013: RTS–Santic Racing Team
- 2014–2017: Pishgaman Yazd

Rahim Ememi (born 17 May 1982) is an Iranian professional cyclist, who is currently suspended from the sport due to a doping infraction.

== Doping ==
On February 10, 2017, the Union Cycliste Internationale announced that Emami had tested positive for an Anabolic Androgenic Steroid during the 2016 Jelajah Malaysia and was provisionally suspended. Emami was handed a seven-year and six-month ban, expiring on May 24, 2024, when Emami would be 42, therefore the ban effectively ended his professional career.

== Major results ==
2007
3rd Overall Tour of Azerbaijan
2008
4th Overall Milad De Nour Tour
5th Overall Tour of Azerbaijan
7th Overall International Presidency Tour
2009
1st Road race, National Road Championships
5th Overall Tour of Azerbaijan
9th Overall Milad De Nour Tour
2010
6th Overall Tour of Azerbaijan
6th Overall International Presidency Tour
2011
1st Overall Tour de Filipinas

1st Stages 1 & 4

2nd Overall Tour de Singkarak
4th Overall International Presidency Tour

1st Stages 2 & 5

5th Overall Tour de Langkawi
6th Overall Kerman Tour
2013
1st Overall Tour of Fuzhou

1st Stage 2

1st Taiwan KOM Challenge
1st Mountains classification Tour of China I
3rd Overall Tour de Ijen

1st Mountains classification
1st Stage 4

2014
1st Road race, National Road Championships
Tour of Iran (Azerbaijan)

1st Mountains classification
1st Stage 4

2nd Overall Tour de Singkarak

1st Stage 4

4th Overall Tour de East Java
2015
1st Overall Tour of Fuzhou
2nd Overall Tour of Japan

1st Mountains classification
1st Stage 5

2nd Overall Tour of Iran (Azerbaijan)
3rd Overall Tour de Taiwan
9th Overall Tour de Filipinas
2016
~~1st Overall Tour of Fuzhou~~

~~1st Mountains classification~~
~~1st Stages 1 & 4~~

2nd Overall Tour of Iran (Azerbaijan)
~~4th Overall Jelajah Malaysia~~

~~1st Stage 1~~

5th Overall Tour de Singkarak

1st Stage 2

5th Overall Tour of Japan
