= Theodore Yates =

Australian bicycle racer

Personal information
- Full name: Theodore Yates
- Born: 28 February 1995 (age 31) Rockingham, Australia

Cycling career
- Sport: Cycling
- Discipline: Road
- Role: Rider
- Rider type: Sprinter

Professional teams
- 2015–2016: Navitas–Satalyst Racing Team
- 2016: Attaque Team Gusto
- 2017–2019: Drapac–Pat's Veg
- 2020: Memil Pro Cycling

Theodore Yates (born 28 February 1995) is an Australian cyclist, who most recently rode for UCI Continental team Memil Pro Cycling. He has won two stages of the Tour of Iran (Azerbaijan) - stage 6 in the 2015 Tour and stage 6 in the 2017 Tour. He also won stage 6 of the 2017 Tour of Thailand. All three of these victories have been in the final stage of the tour.

== Major results ==
2015
1st Stage 6 Tour of Iran (Azerbaijan)
2017
1st Stage 6 Tour of Iran (Azerbaijan)
1st Stage 6 Tour of Thailand
2019
1st Stage 5 New Zealand Cycle Classic
