= Iranian National Road Race Championships =

National road cycling championship in Iran

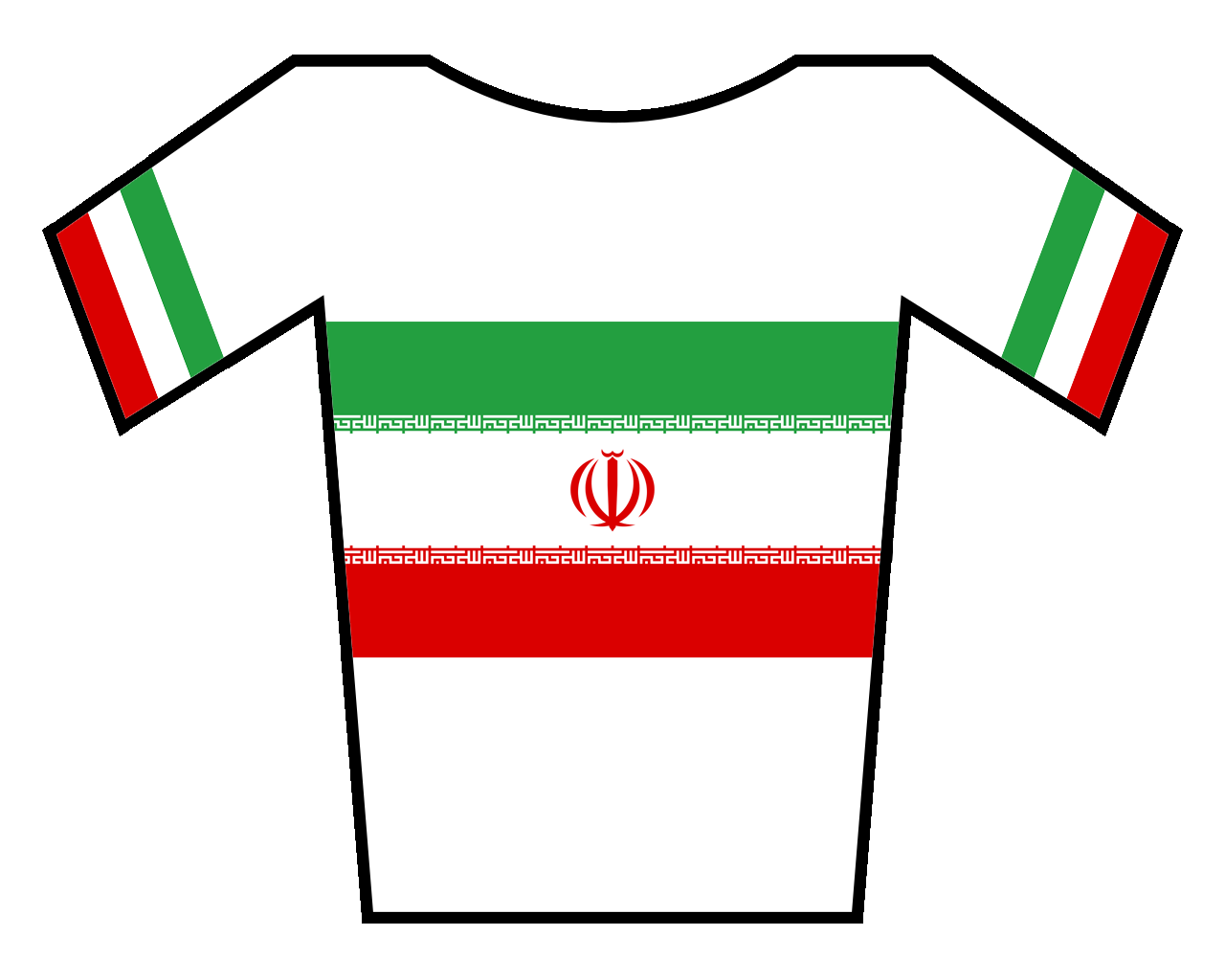
The champion's jersey

The Iranian National Road Race Championships are held annually to decide the Iranian cycling champions in the road race discipline, across various categories.

== Men ==
=== Elite ===
Year	Gold	Silver	Bronze
1999	Abbas Saeidi Tanha	Seyed Moezeddin	Alireza Haghi
2001	Ghader Mizbani	Siros Hashemzadeh	Ahad Kazemi
2005	Mahdi Sohrabi	Amir Zargari	Siros Hashemzadeh
2006	Ahad Kazemi Sarai	Ghader Mizbani Iranagh	Hossein Jahanbanian
2007	Ghader Mizbani Iranagh	Ahad Kazemi Sarai	Faridi Koviy Mahdi
2008	No race		
2009	Rahim Ememi	Ramin Mehrabani	Hossein Nateghi
2010	Mahdi Sohrabi	Hossein Jahanbanian	Arvin Moazemi
2011	Abbas Saeidi Tanha	Mohammad Rajablou	Samad Pourseyedi
2012	Hossein Alizadeh	Amir Zargari	Hamed Jannat
2013	Ghader Mizbani Iranagh	Amir Zargari	Amir Kolahdozhagh
2014	Rahim Ememi	Amir Kolahdozhagh	Behnam Maleki
2015	Behnam Maleki	Ahad Kazemi Sarai	Arvin Moazemi
2016	Mahdi Sohrabi	Arvin Moazemi	Mohammad Ganjkhanlou
2017	Mahdi Sohrabi	Mohammad Rajablou	Ali Khademi
2018	Saeid Safarzadeh	Hamid Beikkhormizi	Reza Hosseini
2019	Mahdi Sohrabi	Saeid Safarzadeh	Amir Kolahdouz
2020	No race		
2021	Saeid Safarzadeh	Mohammad Ganjkhanlou	Maysam Rezaei
2022	Behnam Khosroshahi	Hasan Seyfollahifard	Seyed Milad Ghalichi
2023	Saeid Safarzadeh	Ali Labib	Hasan Seyfollahifard
2024	Hasan Seyfollahifard	Hossein Alizadeh	Hossein Nateghi
2025	Aidin Aliyari	Ali Labib	Mehdi Sohrabi

== See also ==
- Iranian National Time Trial Championships
- National Road Cycling Championships
