= 2013 Tour of Iran (Azerbaijan) =

Tour of Iran (Azerbaijan) 2013
2013 UCI Asia Tour, race 28

Race details
- Dates: 22 May - 27 May
- Stages: 6

Results
	Winner	Ghader Mizbani (Iran)
	Second	Milan Kadlec (Czech)
	Third	Amir Kolahdozhagh (Iran)

Tour of Iran 2013 is the 28th round of Tour of Iran (Azerbaijan) which took place between May 11 and May 16, 2013 in Iranian Azerbaijan. The tour had 6 stage.

== Stages of the Tour ==
Stage	Date	Start	Finish	Length	1st place
1	22 May	Tabriz	Urmia	128 km	
2	23 May	Maragheh	Urmia	194	Alois Kaňkovský (CZE)
3	24 May	Urmia	Khoy	122 km	Alois Kaňkovský (CZE)
4	25 May	Khoy	Aras	152 km	Alois Kaňkovský (CZE)
5	26 May	Aras	Sahand	191	Ghader Mizbani (IRN)
6	27 May	Tabriz	Tabriz	100 km	Milan Kadlec (CZE)

== Final standing ==
Final general classification (1–3)
Rank	Rider	Team	Time
1	Ghader Mizbani (IRN)		18h 43' 20"
2	Milan Kadlec (CZE)		+16"
3	Amir Kolahdozhagh (IRN)		+23"
