= Tabriz Shahrdari Team =

Tabriz Shahrdary Team
Team information
- UCI code: TST
- Registered: Iran
- Founded: 2014
- Discipline: Road
- Status: UCI Continental

Team name history
- 2014 2015–2016 2017–: Tabriz Shahrdari Ranking; Tabriz Shahrdari Team; Tabriz Shahrdary Team

Tabriz Shahrdary Team is an Iranian UCI Continental cycling team established in 2014.

== Team history ==
The team was established with two title sponsors: Tabriz and Ranking Helmets, a Taiwanese cycling equipment company. In the team's first season it became the first Iranian member of Mouvement pour un cyclisme crédible (MPCC).

== Team roster ==
| Rider | Date of birth |
|---|---|
| Jafar Alizadehchakhlou (IRI) | 12 May 1998 (age 28) |
| Khalil Khorshid (IRI) | 27 October 1994 (age 31) |
| Morteza Lotfi (IRI) | 6 May 1996 (age 30) |
| Ghader Mizbani (IRI) | 6 December 1975 (age 50) |

| Rider | Date of birth |
|---|---|
| Bahram Najafi (IRI) | 9 June 1997 (age 29) |
| Farhad Najafi (IRI) | 9 June 1997 (age 29) |
| Hamid Pourhashemi (IRI) | 3 June 1990 (age 36) |
| Saeid Safarzadeh (IRI) | 21 September 1985 (age 40) |

== Major wins ==
2014
Stage 2 Tour de Singkarak, Hossein Alizadeh
2015
Stage 2 Tour of Iran (Azerbaijan), Saeid Safarzadeh
2016
Iran National Road Race Championships, Mehdi Sohrabi
Overall Tour of Iran (Azerbaijan), Samad Pourseyedi

Stage 4, Samad Pourseyedi
Stage 5, Ghader Mizbani

2017
Iran National Time Trial Championships, Samad Pourseyedi
Stage 3 Tour of Iran (Azerbaijan), Saeid Safarzadeh
2018
Stage 3 Tour of Mesopotamia, Hamid Pourhashemi
Iran National Road Race Championships, Saeid Safarzadeh
Stage 5 Tour of Iran (Azerbaijan), Saeid Safarzadeh
