= Korea Cycling Federation =

National governing body of cycle racing in South Korea

KCF logo

The Korea Cycling Federation is the national governing body of cycle racing in South Korea. Its main road bicycle racing event is the Tour de Korea.

It is a member of the UCI and the Asian Cycling Confederation.

The KCF promotes and organizes races in South Korea and is responsible for sending teams to major international events in other countries. KCF also promotes the Tour de Korea, a multi-day stage race in Korea with UCI status.

KCF is exclusively for 1) domestic athletes and 2) aspiring professionals. It does not organize or allow any participation in the sport for any non-Koreans or any person who does not desire to become a professional cyclist. Therefore, KCF primarily holds scholastic events. Teams and races are organized around middle schools, high schools, and Universities.
