= 2014 Tour of Iran (Azerbaijan) =

Tour of Iran (Azerbaijan) 2014
2014 UCI Asia Tour, race 29

Race details
- Dates: 17 June - 22 June
- Stages: 6

Results
	Winner	Ghader Mizbani (Iran)
	Second	Samad Pourseyedi (Iran)
	Third	Rahim Mehrabani (Iran)

Tour of Iran 2014 is 28th round of Tour of Iran (Azerbaijan) which took place between June 17 till June 22, 2014 in Iranian Azerbaijan. The tour had 6 stage.

== Stages of the Tour ==
Stage	Date	Start	Finish	Length	1st place
1	17 June	Tabriz	Urmia	144.4 km	Fabian Schnaidt (GER)
2	June 18	Urmia	Jolfa	210.3	Will Clarke (AUS)
3	June 19	Jolfa	Kaleybar	150 km	Milan Kadlec (CZE)
4	June 20	Kaleybar	Meshginshahr	1506 km	Rahim Emami (IRN)
5	June 21	Sarein	Tabriz	188	Ghader Mizbani (IRN)
6	June 22	Tabriz	Tabriz	124 km	Fabian Schnaidt (GER)

== Final standing ==
Final general classification (1–3)
Rank	Rider	Team	Time
1	Ghader Mizbani (IRN)	Tabriz Petrochemical Team	25h 32' 35"
2	Samad Pourseyedi (IRN)	Tabriz Petrochemical Team	+ 25"
3	Ramin Mehrabani (IRN)	Pishgaman Yazd	+ 1' 43"
