= Search2retain–Health.com.au Cycling Team =

Australian cycling team

Search2retain-Health.com.au Cycling Team
Team information
- UCI code: STR
- Registered: Australia
- Founded: 2014
- Disbanded: 2015
- Discipline: Road
- Status: National (2014); UCI Continental (2015)

Team name history
- 2015: Search2retain-Health.com.au Cycling Team

Search2retain–Health.com.au Cycling Team was an Australian UCI Continental cycling team. After a year running a domestic team, the team applied to become a UCI Continental-level team in 2015.

== Major wins ==
2014
Stage 4 Tour of Toowoomba, Oliver Kent Spark
Stage 4 National Capital Tour, Alistair Donohoe
Melbourne - Warrnambool, Oliver Kent Spark
