= Sahand Ski Resort =

Ski resort in Iran

Sahand
- Location within Iran
- Location: Sahand, Iran
- Nearest city: Tabriz, Iran
- Coordinates: 37°50′00″N 46°51′50″E
- Top elevation: 3,330 m (10,930 ft)
- Base elevation: 3,000 m (9,800 ft)
- Trails: 2
- Lift system: 2 chairlifts 1 surface lifts
- Snowmaking: No
- Night skiing: No

Sahand Ski Resort is a ski resort on the northern slopes of Sahand, in the vicinity of Tabriz, in northwestern Iran. The resort has a ski area with a length of 1200 meters. The ski season in this resort depends on the winter precipitation (normally starts from January, and it continues until mid-March).
