= Taftan Tour =

Annual cycling race in Iran

Race details
- Date: March
- Region: Iran
- Discipline: Road race
- Competition: UCI Asia Tour
- Type: Stage race

History
- First edition: 2007
- Editions: 2
- Final edition: 2008
- First winner: Hossein Nateghi (IRI)
- Most wins: Hossein Nateghi (IRI) (2 wins)
- Final winner: Hossein Nateghi (IRI)

The Taftan Tour was a professional cycling race held annually in Iran. It was part of UCI Asia Tour in category 2.2.

== Winners ==
Year	Country	Rider	Team
2007	Iran	Hossein Nateghi	Mes Kerman
2008	Iran	Hossein Nateghi	Tabriz Petrochemical Team
