= Foolad Mobarakeh Sepahan (cycling team) =

Iranian cycling team

Team information
- UCI code: SPT (until 2017); FSC (from 2019)
- Registered: Iran
- Founded: 2015
- Discipline: Road
- Status: UCI Continental

Key personnel
- General manager: Mohammad Reza Saket
- Team managers: Mohammad Bagheri; Ali Akbar Abdolzadeh; Mehran Esmaeili; Mahmoud Hozouri

Team name history
- 2015–2016 2017 2019–: Sepahan Pro Team; Sepahan Cycling Team; Foolad Mobarakeh Sepahan

Foolad Mobarakeh Sepahan is an Iranian UCI Continental cycling team established in 2015.

== Team roster ==
As of 16 February 2021.

Rider	Date of birth
Matin Bashiri (IRI)	11 April 2001 (age 25)
Mehdi Bidram Gorgabi (IRI)	6 April 2000 (age 26)
Mohammadesmaeil Chaichiraghimi (IRI)	27 October 1994 (age 31)
Davoud Foroughi (IRI)	4 December 1991 (age 34)
Mohammad Ganjkhanlou (IRI)	4 July 1997 (age 29)

Rider	Date of birth
Hamed Jannat (IRI)	2 November 1989 (age 36)
Hossein Nateghi (IRI)	8 February 1987 (age 39)
Samad Pourseyedi (IRI)	15 October 1985 (age 40)
Mohammadhossein Raeisimobarakeh (IRI)	23 August 2001 (age 25)
Masoud Sheikhi (IRI)	2 July 1991 (age 35)
