= Tour de Korea =

Korean multi-day road cycling race

Race details
- Date: April (until 2012); June (since 2013)
- Region: South Korea
- English name: Tour of Korea
- Local name: 투르 드 코리아 (in Korean)
- Discipline: Road
- Competition: UCI Asia Tour 2.1
- Type: Stage race
- Organiser: Korea Cycling Federation
- Web site: www.tourdekorea.or.kr

History
- First edition: 2000
- Editions: 20 (as of 2019)
- First winner: Mikhail Teteriuk (KAZ)
- Most wins: Park Sung-baek (KOR) (2 wins)
- Most recent: Filippo Zaccanti (ITA)

The Tour de Korea is an annual professional road bicycle racing stage race held in South Korea since 2000 as part of the UCI Asia Tour. It was rated by the International Cycling Union (UCI) as a 2.2 category race between 2005 and 2013, then promoted to 2.1 category in 2014. The race is organised by the Korea Cycling Federation.

== History ==
The tour gained international attention when Lance Armstrong, a seven-time Tour de France winner, participated in 2007. Armstrong, having retired from cycling at that time, did not compete, but for the sake of publicity, he rode one lap around the course of the first stage on his mountain bicycle.

Tour de Korea is the only international cycling competition in South Korea. The predecessor to Tour de Korea was stopped in 1997 due to financial strains. Tour de Korea is divided into two divisions: Elite for invitees and competitive cyclists, and a "Special race" for cycling club teams. The prize money for the 2011 tour totaled 200 million Won.

The tour course is 1,500 kilometres (930 mi) long, making it the longest cycling competition in Asia.

The tour comprises exclusively point-to-point road race stages. Unlike the major tours in Europe, such as the Tour de France and Giro d'Italia, there are no individual time trials or team time trials. The tour was planned this way reportedly because the promoters wanted to minimise time and effort spent in recording and sorting race results.

== Past winners ==
Year	Country	Rider	Team
2000	Kazakhstan	Mikhail Teteriuk	
2001	South Korea	Jeon Dae-heung	
2002	China	Tang Xuezhong	Giant Asia Racing Team
2003	New Zealand	Glen Chadwick	Giant Asia Racing Team
2004	Canada	Cory Lange	Marco Polo
2005	Ireland	David McCann	Giant Asia Racing Team
2006	Germany	Tobias Erler	Giant Asia Racing Team
2007	South Korea	Park Sung-baek	Seoul Cycling Team
2008	Uzbekistan	Sergey Lagutin	Uzbekistan (national team)
2009	Switzerland	Roger Beuchat	Team Neotel
2010	United States	Mike Friedman	Jelly Belly–Kenda
2011	Hong Kong	Choi Ki Ho	Hong Kong (national team)
2012	South Korea	Park Sung-baek	KSPO
2013	Great Britain	Michael Cuming	Rapha Condor–JLT
2014	Great Britain	Hugh Carthy	Rapha Condor–JLT
2015	Australia	Caleb Ewan	Orica–GreenEDGE
2016	Slovenia	Grega Bole	Nippo–Vini Fantini
2017	South Korea	Min Kyeong-ho	Seoul Cycling Team
2018	Romania	Serghei Țvetcov	UnitedHealthcare
2019	Italy	Filippo Zaccanti	Nippo–Vini Fantini–Faizanè
2020	No race due to the COVID-19 pandemic in South Korea		
