= Yunnan Lvshan Landscape =

Chinese cycling team

Team information
- UCI code: YUN
- Registered: China
- Founded: 2014
- Discipline: Road
- Status: UCI Continental
- Bicycles: Pardus

Key personnel
- Team manager: Zou Shifeng

Team name history
- 2014 2015–2016 2017 2018 2018–: China Huasen Cycling Team; Team Lvshan Landscape; Yunnan Lvshan Landscape–Taishan Pardus; Yunnan Taishan Pardus; Yunnan Lvshan Landscape

Yunnan Lvshan Landscape is a Chinese UCI Continental cycling team established in 2014.

== Team roster ==
As of 6 September 2023.

Rider	Date of birth
Chen Shu (CHN)	14 June 2000 (age 26)
Li Jin (CHN)	18 January 1998 (age 28)
Ping Caoyun (CHN)	13 May 2002 (age 24)
Petr Rikunov (RUS)	24 February 1997 (age 29)
Shen Chunfan (CHN)	7 June 2002 (age 24)
Andrei Stepanov (RUS)	18 April 1999 (age 27)

Rider	Date of birth
Wang Qiang (CHN)	10 February 1999 (age 27)
Wu Zejun (CHN)	25 September 1998 (age 27)
Zhang Jian (CHN)	28 August 2000 (age 26)
Zhang Shulin (CHN)	3 February 2001 (age 25)
Zhang Xinyu (CHN)	6 November 2000 (age 25)
Zhi Rendong (CHN)	21 September 1995 (age 30)
