= Mes Sungun–Azad =

Team information
- UCI code: UAT
- Registered: Iran
- Founded: 2007
- Discipline: Road
- Status: Cont

Team name history
- 2007–2008 2009–2011 2012 2013 2021–2022 2023: Islamic Azad University Cycling Team; Azad University Iran; Azad University Cross Team; Azad University Giant Team; Azad University Team; Mes Sungun–Azad

Mes Sungun–Azad (UCI team code: UAT) is an Iranian UCI Continental cycling team based in Islamic Azad University, Tehran, Iran; the team was founded in 2007 and disbanded in 2013, before restarting in 2021.

== Major wins ==
2007
Stage 4 Kerman Tour, Hassan Maleki
Stage 6 Kerman Tour, Seyed Moezeddin Seyed
Stage 1 Azerbaijan Tour, Farshad Salehian
Stage 7 Azerbaijan Tour, Seyed Moezeddin Seyed
Stage 1 Tour of East Java, Mehdi Sohrabi
Stage 1, 6 & 7 Tour of Milad du Nour, Mehdi Sohrabi
Stage 2 Tour of Milad du Nour, Amir Zargari
Stage 6 Tour de Hokkaido, Mehdi Sohrabi
2008
Stage 1 President Tour of Iran, Abbas Saeidi
Stage 2 President Tour of Iran, Mehdi Sohrabi
Stage 1, 5 & 6 Azerbaijan Tour, Mehdi Sohrabi
Prologue Kerman Tour, Seyed Mostafa Seyed
Stage 1 Kerman Tour, Abbas Saeidi
2009
Stage 6 Tour of Thailand, Hossein Nateghi
Stage 3 & 8 Jelajah Malaysia, Hossein Nateghi
Stage 4 & 5 Jelajah Malaysia, Anuar Manan
Stage 4 Tour de Singkarak, Hossein Nateghi
Stage 4 President Tour of Iran, Evgeny Vakker
Stage 5 President Tour of Iran, Hossein Nateghi
Kyrgyzstan Road Race Championship, Evgeny Vakker
Kyrgyzstan Time Trial Championship, Evgeny Vakker
Overall Perlis Open, Anuar Manan

Stage 1, Anuar Manan

Stage 1 Azerbaijan Tour, Rasoul Barati
Stage 3 Azerbaijan Tour, Hossein Nateghi
Stage 5 Tour d'Indonesia, Abbas Saeidi
2010
Overall Kerman Tour, Abbas Saeidi

Stage 1, Team Time Trial
Stage 2, Abbas Saeidi
Stage 5, Hossein Nateghi

Stage 2 Azerbaijan Tour, Amir Zargari
Stage 5 President Tour of Iran, Abbas Saeidi
Stage 2b & 4 Tour of Singkarak, Amir Zargari
Overall Tour of Milad du Nour, Ramin Mehrabani

Stage 1, Hossein Nateghi
Stage 2, Ramin Mehrabani

2011
Overall Tour de Filipinas, Rahim Ememi

Stages 1 & 4, Rahim Ememi
Stage 3, Mirsamad Pourseyedi

Overall Tour of Singkarak, Amir Zargari

Stages 2 & 5, Amir Zargari
Stages 3, 6b & 7a, Mirsamad Pourseyedi

Iran Road Race Championships, Abbas Saeidi
2012
Iran Time Trial Championships, Alireza Haghi
Stage 6 Tour de Taiwan, Victor Niño
Overall Tour de Singkarak, Óscar Pujol

Stage 3, Óscar Pujol

2013
Iran Time Trial Championships, Behnam Khalili
U23 Asian Cycling Championship Road Race, Ali Khademi
2021
Iran Road Race Championships, BBehnam Khalilikhosroshahi

== Team roster ==
As of 23 January 2013.

| Rider | Date of birth |
|---|---|
| Ali Asgari (IRI) | 5 April 1993 (age 33) |
| Mohammad Daneshvarkhourram (IRI) | 18 December 1993 (age 32) |
| Hamed Jannat (IRI) | 2 November 1989 (age 36) |
| Ali Khademi (IRI) | 1 January 1992 (age 34) |
| Ehsan Khademi (IRI) | 8 June 1992 (age 34) |

| Rider | Date of birth |
|---|---|
| Behnam Khalili (IRI) | 7 February 1989 (age 37) |
| Ramin Maleki (IRI) | 18 March 1987 (age 39) |
| Arvin Moazzemi (IRI) | 26 March 1990 (age 36) |
| Abbas Saeidi (IRI) | 4 January 1981 (age 45) |
| Amir Zargari (IRI) | 31 July 1980 (age 46) |
