= Tour de Singkarak =

Cycling race in Indonesia

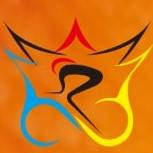

Race details
- Region: West Sumatra, Indonesia
- Local name: Tour of Singkarak
- Nickname: TdS
- Discipline: Road
- Competition: UCI Asia Tour 2.2
- Type: Stage race
- Organiser: BNI-Maybank; Parekraf
- Web site: tourdesingkarak.id

History
- First edition: 2009
- Editions: 10 (as of 2018)
- Final edition: 3–10 November 2019
- First winner: Ghader Mizbani (IRI)
- Most wins: Ghader Mizbani (IRI) (3 wins)
- Final winner: Khalil Khorshid (IRI)

Logo of Tour de Singkarak (2009–2018)

Tour de Singkarak (abbreviated TdS) is an annual professional road bicycle racing stage race held in West Sumatra, Indonesia, and named after the Lake Singkarak. First staged in 2009, Tour de Singkarak is classified by the Union Cycling International (UCI) as a 2.2 category race as part of the UCI Asia Tour. It covers more than 1267 kilometres — from/to Padang passing around lake Singkarak and runs through inland West Sumatran cities — and lasted for a week and held annually. This exciting tour across the picturesque West Sumatra countryside's scenic landscapes, comprising beaches, blue lakes, and numerous hairpin bends, as they climb up to the foot of the volcanoes. The total prize money is IDR 1,000,000,000 (US$100,000). BNI-Maybank was the platinum sponsor of the Tour De Singkarak since 2009 with the Ministry of Culture and Tourism of Indonesia. TDS is the biggest international cycling race in Indonesia, having the fifth largest audience in the world, it attracted many top international cyclists to participate in this world famous annual sports event.

== Past winners ==
Year	Country	Rider	Team
2009	Iran	Ghader Mizbani	Tabriz Petrochemical Team
2010	Iran	Ghader Mizbani	Tabriz Petrochemical Team
2011	Iran	Amir Zargari	Azad University Iran
2012	Spain	Óscar Pujol	Azad University Cross Team
2013	Iran	Ghader Mizbani	Tabriz Petrochemical Team
2014	Iran	Amir Zargari	Pishgaman Yazd
2015	Iran	Arvin Moazemi	Pishgaman–Giant
2016	Iran	Amir Kolahdozhagh	Pishgaman–Giant
2017	Iran	Khalil Korshid	Tabriz Shahrdary Team
2018	Ireland	Jesse Ewart	Team Sapura Cycling
2019	Ireland	Jesse Ewart	Team Sapura Cycling

== Tour de Singkarak 2009 ==
Tour de Singkarak 2009 was held for the first time in 29 April to 3 May 2009 under full sponsorship of Ministry of Culture and Tourism of Indonesia in order to promote tourism in West Sumatra. Tour de Singkarak 2009 attracted teams from 15 countries. The race covers 459 kilometres in five stages, lasted for seven days with total prize money 600 million rupiah.

=== Stages ===
- Stage 1 Padang: 15.8 kilometres, start in Taman Budaya Padang.
- Stage 2a Padang—Pariaman: 84.5 kilometres
- Stage 2b, Pariaman— Muko-muko/Lake Maninjau : 90.6 kilometres
- Stage 3 Lake Maninjau—Bukittinggi: 51.3 kilometres
- Stage 4 Padangpanjang—Sawahlunto: 88.2 kilometres, start in front of Jam Gadang through Pagaruyung Palace
- Stage 5 Sawahlunto—Batusangkar: 102.4 kilometres
- Stage 6 Bukittinggi—Solok: 244.6 kilometres around Lake Singkarak.

=== Teams ===
- (Iran) Tabriz Petrochemical Team
- (Japan) Aisan Racing Team
- (Indonesia) Polygon Sweet Nice
- (Australia) Bike Bug North Sydney-Carroll & O’Dea Lawyers
- 7 Eleven Racing Team By Road Bike Philippines
- OCBC Singapore Continental Cycling Team
- Malaysia (national team)
- (Taiwan) Giant Asia Racing Team
- (Netherlands) CCN Collosi
- (South Korea) KSPO Cycling Team
- (Iran) Tabriz Petrochemical Team
- (Indonesia) United Bike Kencana Tim
- (Indonesia) Dodol Picnic Garut
- (Indonesia) Kutai Kartanegara Cycling Club
- Arraya Indonesia
- (Indonesia) Bintang Kranggan Cycling Club
- (Indonesia) Custom Cycling Club
- (Indonesia) Komunitas Sepeda Sumatera Barat
- (Indonesia) Putera Perjuangan Bandung
- (Indonesia) Pengurus Provinsi ISSI Sumatera Barat
- (Indonesia) Pengurus Provinsi ISSI Yogyakarta.

== Tour de Singkarak 2010 ==
Tour de Singkarak 2010 was held in 1–6 June 2010, joined by 12 foreign teams and 10 Indonesian teams. The race covers the total distance 551.7 kilometres in six stages. The tour was sponsored by Ministry of Culture and Tourism of Indonesia with support from West Sumatran cities and regencies (kabupaten).

=== Stages ===
- Stage 1 Padang
- Stage 2 Padang—Pariaman
- Stage 3 Pariaman—Bukittinggi
- Stage 4 Bukittinggi—Payakumbuh
- Stage 5 Payakumbuh—Sawahlunto
- Stage 6a Sawahlunto—Pagaruyung Palace
- Stage 6b Pagaruyung—Padang Panjang
- Stage 7 Padang Panjang—Lake Singkarak

== Tour de Singkarak 2011 ==
Tour de Singkarak 2011 was held in 6–12 June 2011, covers 743.5 kilometres in seven stages across 12 cities and regencies in West Sumatra. Several tourism spots were crossed in this edition, such as Arau valley, Lake Maninjau, Kelok 44, and twin lakes Lake Diatas and Lake Dibawah.

== Tour de Singkarak 2012 ==
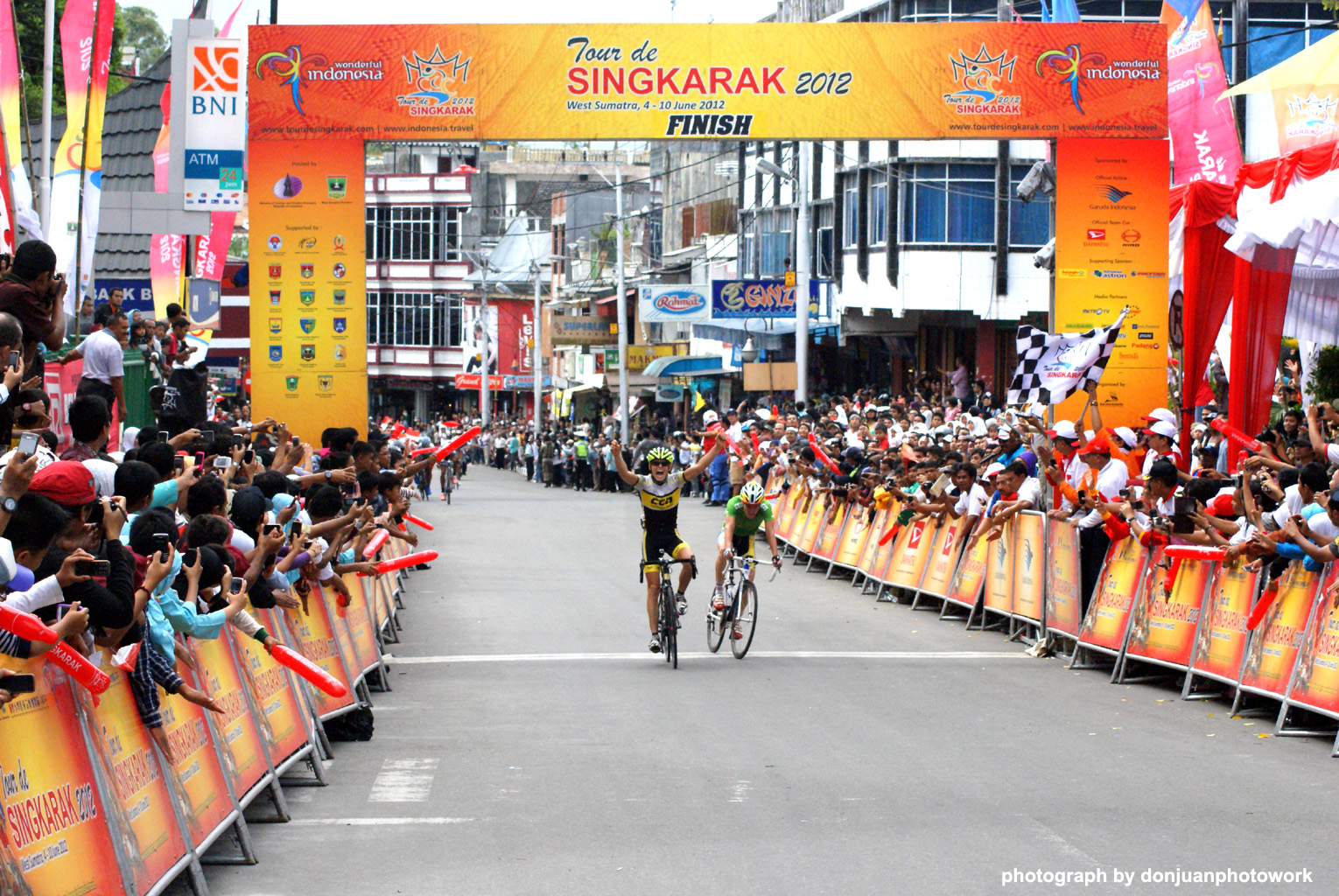
Tour de Singkarak 2012

Tour de Singkarak 2012 was held on 3 June 2012, covers 856 kilometres in seven stages which the routes has been surveyed by Amaury Sport Organization which surveyed also Tour de France routes.

=== Stages ===
- Stage 1 Sawahlunto—Muaro Sijunjung—Sawahlunto
- Stage 2 Sawahlunto—Arau Payakumbuh
- Stage 3 Payakumbuh—Pagaruyung Palace
- Stage 4 Pagaruyung—Malibo Anai—Kelok 44—Bukittinggi
- Stage 5 Padang Panjang—Solok
- Stage 6 Gandoriah Beach—Pesisir Selatan
- Stage 7 Pesisir Selatan—Padang

== Tour de Singkarak 2013 ==
Tour de Singkarak 2013 is the fifth TDS held on 2–9 June 2013, covers 1181,6 kilometres in seven stages, participated by cyclists from 25 countries.

=== Stages ===
- Stage 1 Bukittinggi – Bonjol
- Stage 2 Padang Panjang – Tanah Datar
- Stage 3 Payakumbuh – Danau Singkarak
- Stage 4 Sijunjung – Dharmasraya
- Stage 5 Sawahlunto – Solok Selatan
- Stage 6 Pariaman – Pesisir Selatan
- Stage 7 Padang Pariaman – Padang

== Tour de Singkarak 2014 ==
In the sixth Tour de Singkarak which ran in 7 to 15 June 2014, the tour route was 1,250 kilometers through 18 regencies. The number of participants reached around 160 riders from 20 teams

== Tour de Singkarak 2015 ==
Tour de Singkarak 2015 is the 7th race held on 3 to 10 October 2015. Total 24 teams took part, 5 of them came from Indonesia.

=== Teams ===
- (Philippines) 7 Eleven Roadbike
- (Japan) Aisian Racing Team
- (Austria) Arbo Denzel Cliff
- (Taiwan) Attaque Team Gusto
- (Japan) Bridgestone Anchor Cycling Team
- (China) Holy Brother Cycling Team
- (Japan) Kinan Cycling Team
- (Malaysia) National Sports Council
- (Indonesia) Pegasus Continental Cycling Team
- (Iran) Pishgaman Giant Team
- (Japan) Shimano Racing Team
- (Thailand) Singaha Infinite Cycling Team
- (Australia) ST. George Mérida Cycling Team
- (Iran) Tabriz Petrochemical Team
- (Luxembourg) Team Diferdance Gigi Losch
- (Malaysia) Terengganu Cycling Team
- (Kazakhstan) Track Team Astana (Kazakastan)
- Uzbekistan National Team (Uzbekistan)
- Persatuan Besar Ikatan Sepeda Sport Indonesia

== Tour de Singkarak 2016 ==
Tour de Singkarak was held from 6 to 14 August. The race features 23 cycling teams, 18 international were and five Indonesian. The international cycling teams were from Malaysia, Singapore, Laos, Taiwan, Japan, Switzerland, Korea, Australia, Iran, the United Arab Emirates, the Philippines, Hong Kong, and Kenya. A total 230 participants explored eight stages of the 1,102 kilometer track.

=== Teams ===
- (Australia) St. George Mérida
- (Australia) Cisco Racing Team p/b Scody
- (Hong Kong) HKSI Pro Cycling Team
- (Indonesia) Pegasus Cycling Team
- Indonesia National Team
- CCC Indonesia
- (Indonesia) BRCC Banyuwangi
- (Indonesia) BBC Pessel Bank Nagari Sumbar
- (Indonesia) KFC Cycling Team
- (Iran) Pishgaman Cycling Team
- (Japan) Kinan Cycling Team
- (Kenya) Kenyan Riders Downunder
- (South Korea) Korail Cycling Team
- (Laos) Black Inc Cycling Team
- (Malaysia) Terengganu Cycling Team
- (Philippines) 7 Eleven Sava RVP
- (Singapore) Singha Infinite
- (Taiwan) Action Cycling Team
- (United Arab Emirates) Sharjah Cycling Team

== Tour de Singkarak 2017 ==
The event was held from 18 to 26 November 2017, and cyclists from 29 countries took part. The race was divided into nine stages,

- Stage 1:Tanah Datar – Padang with the travel distance of 107 kilometers,
- Stage 2: Painan – Sawahlunto (166 kilometers),
- Stage 3: Muaro Sijunjung – Punjung Island (100 kilometers),
- Stage 4: Singkarak Lake – Payakumbuh (135 kilometers),
- Stage 5: Harau Valley – Padang Panjang (101 kilometers),
- Stage 6: Solok – South Padang Aro Solok (140 kilometers),
- Stage 7: Pariaman – West Pasaman (157 kilometers),
- Stage 8: Padang Pariaman – Agam (101 kilometers), and
- Stage 9: Pasaman – Bukittinggi (90 kilometers).

== Tour de Singkarak 2018 ==
2018 Tour de Singkarak was held from 4–11 November, marks its 10th anniversary. Twenty one cycling teams from 26 countries, including four domestic teams and one local team, will participate. This year is extended to 1,267 kilometers (km), from 1,250 km in the previous 2017 TDS, covers 16 districts and cities.

=== Stages ===
The event was held in eight stages,

- Stage 1: Bukittinggi-Sijunjung, stretching 140.5 km,
- Stage 2: Sawahlunto- Dharmasraya, covering a total distance of 204.1 km,
- Stage 3: Singkarak-Tanah Datar, stretching 150.4 km,
- Stage 4: Padang-Agam,
- Stage 5: Limapuluh Kota-Pasaman, 170.5 km,
- Stage 6: Solok-Payakumbuh, 105 km,
- Stage 7: Padangpanjang-South Solok, 194.4 km, and
- Stage 8/Final: South Pesisir to Pariaman, stretching 158 km.

=== Teams ===
114 cyclists from 20 teams participated in the first stage of TdS 2018.

- Matrix Powertag of Japan
- (Malaysia) Terengganu Cycling Team
- (Malaysia) Sapura Cycling Team
- (Japan) Interpro Stradalli Cycling
- (South Korea) LX Cycling Team
- (Laos) Nex- CCN
- (Philippines) 7 Eleven Sava RVP
- (Australia) McDonalds Downunder
- (Australia) St. George Continental
- (Malaysia) Forca Amskins
- (Indonesia) PGN Cycling Team
- (Indonesia) Padang Road Bike BNI
- Advan CCC Indonesia
- (Indonesia) BRCC Banyuwangi
- (Indonesia) KFC Cycling Team
- (China) Ningxia Sports Lottery–Livall Cycling Team
- (China) Qinghai Tianyoude Cycling Team
- (Thailand) Thai Continental/Thai National Team
- (Germany) Bike Aid
- (Russia) Java Partizan
- (Cambodia) PCS-CCN

== Tour de Singkarak 2019 ==
2019 Tour de Singkarak covers 1,362 kilometers in West Sumatra and Jambi provinces. Ninety-eight cyclists from 24 teams and 24 countries have signed up for the tournament, held 3–10 November 2019.

=== Teams ===
- (Malaysia) Team Sapura Cycling
- Roadbike Philippines
- (Iran) Foolad Mobarakeh Sepahan
- Go for Gold Philippines
- Thailand Continental Cycling Team
- Brunei Continental Cycling Team
- (Indonesia) KFC Cycling Team
- (Indonesia) Pgn Road Cycling Team
- (Iran) Omidnia Mashhad Team
- (Laos) Nex CCN Cycling Team
- Team Velofit Australia
- (Laos) Team ProCyclingStats.com
- (Kuwait) Nice Cycling Team
- (Malaysia) Terengganu Polygon Cycling Team
- (Indonesia) BRCC
- (Indonesia) Dodol Picnic Lasminingrat Garut
- (Indonesia) KGB Jakarta
- (Indonesia) Padang Roadbike Bank Nagari

=== Stages ===
The event has 9 stages,

- Stage 1: 107.3 km from Pariaman city to Tanah Datar regency.
- Stage 2: 112.2 km from Pasaman regency to Bukittinggi city.
- Stage 3: stretches 129.9 km from Lembah Harau valley (Limapuluh Kota regency) to Padang Panjang city,
- Stage 4: comprise 205.3 km from Dharmasraya regency to Sawahlunto city,
- Stage 5: 206.5 km ride from Payakumbuh city to Ambun Pagi (Agam regency),
- Stage 6 : 214.1 km from Dermaga Singkarak Dock (Solok regency) to Padang Aro (South Solok regency),
- Stage 7: 82.9 km from Kayu Aro (Kerinci regency) to Dermaga Danau Kerinci Dock (Kerinci regency of Jambi),
- Stage 8: 212.9 km from Kota Sungai Penuh (Jambi) to Painan (South Pesisir regency of West Sumatra),
- Stage 9: 107.7 km from Carocok Beach (South Pesisir regency, West Sumatra) to Padang.
