= Aras Free Zone =

Iranian free trade zone

Coordinates: 38°55′49″N 45°38′02″E

- Type: Free Economic Zone
- Headquarters: East Azerbaijan, Iran
- Website: www.arasfz.ir

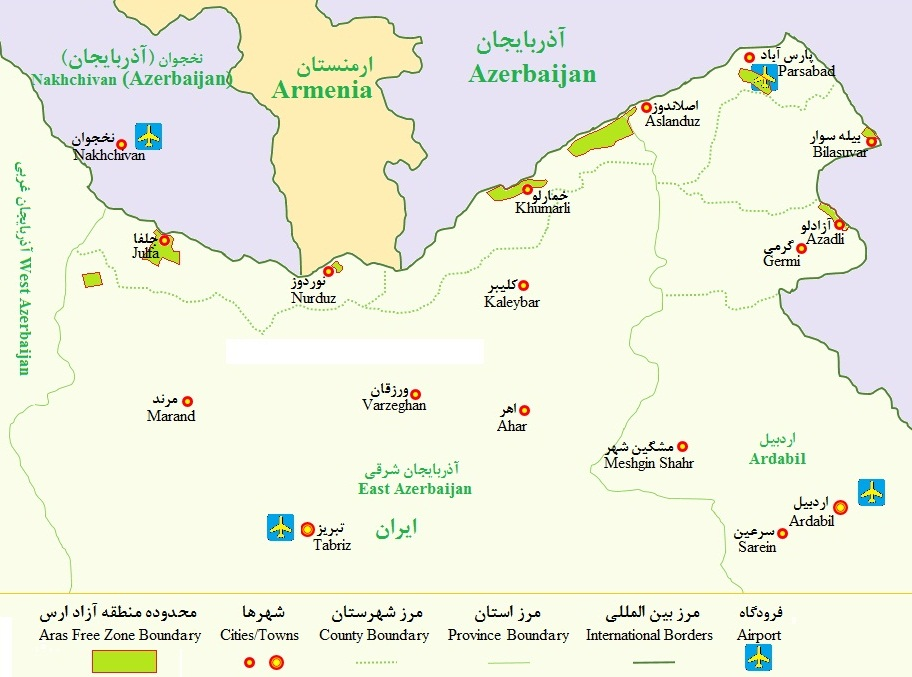
Aras Free Economic and Industrial Zone map

Aras Free Trade - Industrial Zone (abbreviated as AFZ) is located in the Northwest of Iran at the border point with neighboring Armenia, Azerbaijan and the Nakhchivan Autonomous Republic. According to the Decree No. 20708/T/530820, dated 28 June 2005 by the Board of Ministers, the area of the Aras Free Zone included 9,700 hectares of the lands of the region. This area was expanded on 4 December 2008 to 51,000 hectares based on the new decree of this Board, including some parts of the Jolfa and Kaleybar towns. This approved area in the attached part has increased the main district from 9,700 hectares to 20,500 hectares, and in three detached parts makes up totally 51,000 hectares of entire Aras Free Zone including a part of the Kaleibar city with the area of 24,000 hectares (called Gholi Beig Lou) and the vicinity of Khodafarin Dam with the area of 6,100 hectares as well as the district of Norduz Customs (Iran-Armenia border) with the area of 240 hectares.

This organization was established by the decree of the Islamic Consultative Assembly on 24 August 2003 in order to accelerate the economic development of this region.

== Geography ==
The city of Jolfa is located in the northwest of East Azerbaijan Province, between 45°17′ to 46°31′ of the eastern longitude and 38°39′ to 39°2′ of the northern latitude, as a narrow strip on the northern border of the Province. It ends up from the north to the Aras River, Armenia, Nakhchivan and Azerbaijan. The area of this city is 1670.31 km^{2} and the city of Kaleibar is located in the eastern part of this town and the cities of Marand and Ahar are considered its southern neighbors. On average, the width of the city is 17 km and its length is 100 km. Jolfa is the capital city and is located 137 km away from northwest of Tabriz and 65 km from north of Marand. In terms of the area, Jolfa is considered among the small towns of the Province and with an area of 1670.31 km^{2} only covers %3.4 of the total area of the Province and in this regard stands at the twelfth place.

== Climate ==
AFZ is located in semi dry and semi cold North-West part of Iran.

== Major facilities ==
Facilities include railways and roads and restaurants.

== Visa-free ==
Holders of normal passports travelling as tourists can enter Aras Free Zone without a visa with maximum stay of 2 weeks (extendable), as by December 2017 .

== Admission refused ==
Admission is refused to holders of passports or travel documents containing an Israeli visa or stamp or any data showing that visitor has been to Israel or indication of any connection with the state of Israel during the last 12 months.

== shopping center ==
Aras has a variety of shopping centers.

== See also ==
- Foreign Direct Investment in Free Trade Zones and Special Economic Zones in Iran
