= Pishgaman Cycling Team =

Iranian cycling team

Team information
- UCI code: PKY
- Registered: Iran
- Founded: 2014
- Discipline: Road
- Status: UCI Continental

Team name history
- 2014 2015–2016 2017–: Pishgaman Yazd; Pishgaman–Giant Team; Pishgaman Cycling Team

Pishgaman Cycling Team is an Iranian UCI Continental cycling team established in 2014.

== Doping ==
On 11 December 2015, Naser Rezavi tested positive for anabolic steroids and was given a four-year ban.

On February 10, 2017, the UCI announced that Rahim Emami had tested positive for an Anabolic Androgenic Steroid during the 2016 Jelajah Malaysia and was provisionally suspended. As teammate Naser Rezavi also tested positive in the Jelajah Malaysia in December 2015, the UCI considers this a second Adverse Analytical Finding in a 12-month period with the team potentially facing a ban of between 15 and 45 days. Emami was handed a seven year and six month ban, expiring on May 24, 2024, when Emami will be 42, therefore the ban will effectively end his professional career.

== Team roster ==
Rider	Date of birth
Behnam Ariyan (IRI)	11 April 1990 (age 36)
Hamid Beikkhormizi (IRI)	8 January 1992 (age 34)
Majid Abouei Mehrizi (IRI)	18 April 1996 (age 30)
Seyed Moezeddin Seyed Rezaei Khormizi (IRI)	27 May 1979 (age 47)
Seyed Mohammad Mehdi Seyedrezaei (IRI)	25 October 1992 (age 33)

Rider	Date of birth
Mohammad Amin Shafaghi Yazdi (IRI)	20 May 1998 (age 28)
Seyed Sajjad Tabatabaei (IRI)	14 August 1999 (age 27)
Mohammadhossein Zare Bidoki (IRI)	6 May 1999 (age 27)
Aboulfazl Zarezadehmehrizi (IRI)	25 January 1994 (age 32)

== Major wins ==
2014
Iran National Road Race Championships, Rahim Emami
Overall Tour de Singkarak, Amir Zargari

Stage 3, Ramin Mehrabani
Stage 4, Rahim Emami

Stage 4 Tour of Iran, Rahim Emami
2015
Asian Road Race Championships, Hossein Askari
Asian Time Trial Championships, Hossein Askari
Iran National Time Trial Championships, Hossein Askari
Stage 5 Tour of Japan, Rahim Emami
Stage 4 Tour of Iran, Hossein Askari
Overall Tour de Singkarak, Arvin Moazzami

Stage 2, Amir Zargari
Stage 6, Hossein Askari

2016
Iran National Time Trial Championships, Arvin Moazzami
Stage 4 Tour of Japan, Mohammad Rajablou
Overall Tour de Singkarak, Amir Kolahdouz

Stage 2, Rahim Emami
Stage 4, Amir Kolahdouz

Overall Jelajah Malaysia, Arvin Moazzami

Stage 1, Rahim Emami
Stage 2, Arvin Moazzami

Overall Tour of Fuzhou, Rahim Emami

Stages 1 & 4, Rahim Emami

2017
Stage 3 Tour de Flores, Arvin Moazzami
Stage 4 Tour of Iran (Azerbaijan), Amir Kolahdouz
Stage 4 International Tour de Banyuwangi Ijen, Arvin Moazzami
Stage 3 International Tour de Banyuwangi Ijen, Amir Kolahdouz
2018
Stage 3 Tour of Mevlana, Mohammad Ganjkhanlou
Stages 1 & 6 Tour of Iran (Azerbaijan), Mohammad Ganjkhanlou
