= Tour of Fuzhou =

Chinese multi-day road cycling race

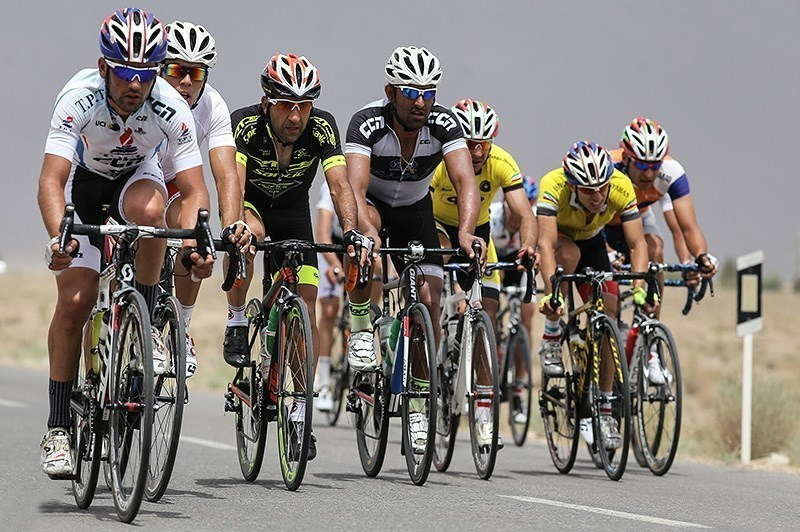
- 2016 Tour of Fuzhou

Race details
- Date: November
- Region: China
- Discipline: Road
- Type: Stage race
- Web site: www.touroffz.com

History
- First edition: 2012
- Editions: 8 (as of 2019)
- First winner: Choi Ki Ho (HKG)
- Most wins: Rahim Emami (IRI) (3 times)
- Most recent: Artur Fedosseyev (KAZ)

Tour of Fuzhou is a men's one-day cycle race which takes place in China and was rated by the UCI as 2.1 (rated 2.2 until the 2016 edition) and forms part of the UCI Asia Tour.

== Overall winners ==
Year	Winner	Team
2012	(Hong Kong) Choi Ki Ho	Hong Kong National team
2013	(Iran) Rahim Emami	RTS–Santic Racing Team
2014	(Iran) Samad Pourseyedi	Tabriz Petrochemical Team
2015	(Iran) Rahim Emami	Pishgaman–Giant
2016	(Iran) Rahim Emami	Pishgaman–Giant
2017	(Australia) Jai Hindley	Mitchelton Scott
2018	(Kazakhstan) Ilya Davidenok	Beijing XDS–Innova Cycling Team
2019	(Kazakhstan) Artur Fedosseyev	Shenzhen Xidesheng Cycling Team
