= 2018 Tour de Langkawi =

2018 UCI Asia Tour

Race details
- Dates: 18–25 March 2018
- Stages: 8
- Distance: 1,347.4 km (837.2 mi)
- Winning time: 32h 06' 45"

Results
| Jersey awarded to the overall winner | Winner | Artem Ovechkin (RUS) | (Terengganu Cycling Team) |
| | Second | Łukasz Owsian (POL) | (CCC–Sprandi–Polkowice) |
| | Third | Benjamin Dyball (AUS) | (St George Continental Cycling Team) |
| Jersey awarded to the points classification winner | Points | Andrea Guardini (ITA) | (Bardiani–CSF) |
| Jersey awarded to the mountains classification winner | Mountains | Álvaro Duarte (COL) | (Forca Amskins Racing) |
| Jersey awarded to the team classification winner | Team | (Italy) Wilier Triestina–Selle Italia | |

The 2018 Tour de Langkawi was the 23rd edition of an annual professional road bicycle racing stage race held in Malaysia since 1996. The race was run at the highest category apart from those races which make up the UCI World Tour, and was rated by the Union Cycliste Internationale (UCI) as a 2.HC (hors category) race as part of the 2018 UCI Asia Tour.

== Teams ==
23 teams accepted invitations to participate in the 2017 Tour de Langkawi. Two UCI WorldTeam – Team Dimension Data and Astana was invited to the race, along with six UCI Professional Continental and thirteen UCI Continental teams. The field was completed by one national selection teams. Each team had a maximum of six riders.

UCI WorldTeams

- Team Dimension Data
- Astana

UCI Professional Continental teams

- Bardiani–CSF
- CCC–Sprandi–Polkowice
- Team Manzana Postobón
- Rally Cycling
- Wilier Triestina–Selle Italia
- Androni Giocattoli–Sidermec

UCI Continental teams

- 7 Eleven–Cliqq Roadbike Philippines
- Bennelong SwissWellness Cycling Team
- Giant Cycling Team
- Forca Amskins Racing
- Hengxiang Cycling Team
- KFC Cycling Team
- Kinan Cycling Team
- KSPO Bianchi Asia
- Mitchelton–BikeExchange
- St George Continental Cycling Team
- Team Sapura Cycling
- Terengganu Cycling Team
- Thailand Continental Cycling Team

National team

- Malaysia

== Route ==
Stage schedule
| Stage | Date | Route | Distance | Type | Winner |
|---|---|---|---|---|---|
| 1 | 18 March | Kangar, Perlis to Kulim, Kedah | 147.9 km (92 mi) | Flat stage | Andrea Guardini (ITA) |
| 2 | 19 March | Gerik, Perak to Kota Bharu, Kelantan | 208.3 km (129 mi) | Hilly stage | Riccardo Minali (ITA) |
| 3 | 20 March | Kota Bharu. Kelantan to Kuala Terengganu, Terengganu | 166 km (103 mi) | Flat stage | Adam de Vos (CAN) |
| 4 | 21 March | Dungun, Terengganu to Pekan, Pahang | 183.8 km (114 mi) | Flat stage | Riccardo Minali (ITA) |
| 5 | 22 March | Bentong, Pahang to Cameron Highlands, Pahang | 169.4 km (105 mi) | Mountain stage | Artem Ovechkin (RUS) |
| 6 | 23 March | Tapah, Perak to Tanjung Malim, Perak | 108.5 km (67 mi) | Flat stage | Luca Pacioni (ITA) |
| 7 | 24 March | Nilai, Negeri Sembilan to Muar, Johor | 222.4 km (138 mi) | Hilly stage | Manuel Belletti (ITA) |
| 8 | 25 March | Rembau, Negeri Sembilan to Kuala Lumpur | 141.1 km (88 mi) | Flat stage | Andrea Guardini (ITA) |

== Stages ==
=== Stage 1 ===
18 March 2018 — Kangar, Perlis to Kulim, Kedah, 147.9 km (92 mi)

Stage 1 Result
| Rank | Rider | Team | Time |
|---|---|---|---|
| 1 | Andrea Guardini (ITA) | Bardiani–CSF | 3h 29' 04" |
| 2 | Seo Joon Yong (KOR) | KSPO Bianchi Asia | + 0" |
| 3 | Mekseb Debesay (ERI) | Team Dimension Data | + 0" |
| 4 | Manuel Belletti (ITA) | Androni Giocattoli–Sidermec | + 0" |
| 5 | Riccardo Minali (ITA) | Astana | + 0" |
| 6 | Luca Pacioni (ITA) | Wilier Triestina–Selle Italia | + 0" |
| 7 | Kaden Groves (AUS) | St George Continental Cycling Team | + 0" |
| 8 | Scott Sunderland (AUS) | Bennelong SwissWellness Cycling Team | + 0" |
| 9 | Alan Banaszek (POL) | CCC–Sprandi–Polkowice | + 0" |
| 10 | Abdul Hadi (INA) | KFC Cycling Team | + 0" |

General classification after Stage 1
| Rank | Rider | Team | Time |
|---|---|---|---|
| 1 | Andrea Guardini (ITA) | Bardiani–CSF | 3h 28' 52" |
| 2 | Seo Joon Yong (KOR) | KSPO Bianchi Asia | + 6" |
| 3 | Wang Bo (CHN) | Hengxiang Cycling Team | + 6" |
| 4 | Mekseb Debesay (ERI) | Team Dimension Data | + 8" |
| 5 | Nik Mohamad Azman Zulkifli (MAS) | Forca Amskins Racing | + 8" |
| 6 | Juan Sebastián Molano (COL) | Team Manzana Postobón | + 9" |
| 7 | Muhammad Abdurrahman (INA) | KFC Cycling Team | + 10" |
| 8 | Dylan Page (SWI) | Team Sapura Cycling | + 11" |
| 9 | Manuel Belletti (ITA) | Androni Giocattoli–Sidermec | + 12" |
| 10 | Riccardo Minali (ITA) | Astana | + 12" |

=== Stage 2 ===
19 March 2018 — Gerik, Perak to Kota Bharu, Kelantan, 208.3 km (129 mi)

Stage 2 Result
| Rank | Rider | Team | Time |
|---|---|---|---|
| 1 | Riccardo Minali (ITA) | Astana | 5h 18' 20" |
| 2 | Matteo Malucelli (ITA) | Androni Giocattoli–Sidermec | + 0" |
| 3 | Paolo Simion (ITA) | Bardiani–CSF | + 0" |
| 4 | Yevgeniy Gidich (KAZ) | Astana | + 0" |
| 5 | Marko Kump (SLO) | CCC–Sprandi–Polkowice | + 0" |
| 6 | Luca Pacioni (ITA) | Wilier Triestina–Selle Italia | + 0" |
| 7 | Kaden Groves (AUS) | St George Continental Cycling Team | + 0" |
| 8 | Eric Young (USA) | Rally Cycling | + 0" |
| 9 | Seo Joon Yong (KOR) | KSPO Bianchi Asia | + 0" |
| 10 | Dylan Page (SWI) | Team Sapura Cycling | + 0" |

General classification after Stage 2
| Rank | Rider | Team | Time |
|---|---|---|---|
| 1 | Riccardo Minali (ITA) | Astana | 8h 47' 13" |
| 2 | Seo Joon Yong (KOR) | KSPO Bianchi Asia | + 5" |
| 3 | Matteo Malucelli (ITA) | Androni Giocattoli–Sidermec | + 5" |
| 4 | Mekseb Debesay (ERI) | Team Dimension Data | + 7" |
| 5 | Paolo Simion (ITA) | Bardiani–CSF | + 7" |
| 6 | Yevgeniy Gidich (KAZ) | Astana | + 7" |
| 7 | Nik Mohamad Azman Zulkifli (MAS) | Forca Amskins Racing | + 7" |
| 8 | Marcelo Felipe (PHI) | 7 Eleven–Cliqq Roadbike Philippines | + 8" |
| 9 | Niu Yikui (CHN) | Mitchelton–BikeExchange | + 8" |
| 10 | Juan Sebastián Molano (COL) | Team Manzana Postobón | + 8" |

=== Stage 3 ===
20 March 2018 — Kota Bharu. Kelantan to Kuala Terengganu, Terengganu, 166 km (103 mi)

Stage 3 Result
| Rank | Rider | Team | Time |
|---|---|---|---|
| 1 | Adam De Vos (CAN) | Rally Cycling | 3h 58' 18" |
| 2 | Kim Dae Yong (KOR) | KSPO Bianchi Asia | + 13" |
| 3 | Nik Mohamad Azman Zulkifli (MAS) | Forca Amskins Racing | + 13" |
| 4 | Harry Sweeny (AUS) | Mitchelton–BikeExchange | + 13" |
| 5 | Anuar Manan (MAS) | Forca Amskins Racing | + 1' 19" |
| 6 | Eric Young (USA) | Rally Cycling | + 1' 19" |
| 7 | Mohd Harrif Saleh (MAS) | Terengganu Cycling Team | + 1' 19" |
| 8 | Luca Pacioni (ITA) | Wilier Triestina–Selle Italia | + 1' 19" |
| 9 | Dylan Page (SWI) | Team Sapura Cycling | + 1' 19" |
| 10 | Marko Kump (SLO) | CCC–Sprandi–Polkowice | + 1' 19" |

General classification after Stage 3
| Rank | Rider | Team | Time |
|---|---|---|---|
| 1 | Adam De Vos (CAN) | Rally Cycling | 12h 45' 31" |
| 2 | Nik Mohamad Azman Zulkifli (MAS) | Forca Amskins Racing | + 14" |
| 3 | Harry Sweeny (AUS) | Mitchelton–BikeExchange | + 22" |
| 4 | Riccardo Minali (ITA) | Astana | + 1' 19" |
| 5 | Matteo Malucelli (ITA) | Androni Giocattoli–Sidermec | + 1' 24" |
| 6 | Seo Joon Yong (KOR) | KSPO Bianchi Asia | + 1' 24" |
| 7 | Mekseb Debesay (ERI) | Team Dimension Data | + 1' 26" |
| 8 | Paolo Simion (ITA) | Bardiani–CSF | + 1' 26" |
| 9 | Yevgeniy Gidich (KAZ) | Astana | + 1' 26" |
| 10 | Thomas Lebas (FRA) | Kinan Cycling Team | + 1' 27" |

=== Stage 4 ===
21 March 2018 — Dungun, Terengganu to Pekan, Pahang, 183.8 km (114 mi)

Stage 4 Result
| Rank | Rider | Team | Time |
|---|---|---|---|
| 1 | Riccardo Minali (ITA) | Astana | 4h 10' 14" |
| 2 | Andrea Guardini (ITA) | Bardiani–CSF | + 0" |
| 3 | Mohd Harrif Saleh (MAS) | Terengganu Cycling Team | + 0" |
| 4 | Luca Pacioni (ITA) | Wilier Triestina–Selle Italia | + 0" |
| 5 | Manuel Belletti (ITA) | Androni Giocattoli–Sidermec | + 0" |
| 6 | Alan Banaszek (POL) | CCC–Sprandi–Polkowice | + 0" |
| 7 | Anthony Giacoppo (AUS) | Bennelong SwissWellness Cycling Team | + 0" |
| 8 | Jordan Parra (COL) | Team Manzana Postobón | + 0" |
| 9 | Dylan Page (SWI) | Team Sapura Cycling | + 0" |
| 10 | Jacob Hennessy (GBR) | Mitchelton–BikeExchange | + 0" |

General classification after Stage 4
| Rank | Rider | Team | Time |
|---|---|---|---|
| 1 | Adam De Vos (CAN) | Rally Cycling | 16h 55' 45" |
| 2 | Nik Mohamad Azman Zulkifli (MAS) | Forca Amskins Racing | + 14" |
| 3 | Harry Sweeny (AUS) | Mitchelton–BikeExchange | + 22" |
| 4 | Riccardo Minali (ITA) | Astana | + 1' 09" |
| 5 | Paolo Simion (ITA) | Bardiani–CSF | + 1' 26" |
| 6 | Yevgeniy Gidich (KAZ) | Astana | + 1' 27" |
| 7 | Marcelo Felipe (PHI) | 7 Eleven–Cliqq Roadbike Philippines | + 1' 28" |
| 8 | Thomas Lebas (FRA) | Kinan Cycling Team | + 1' 10" |
| 9 | Niu Yikui (CHN) | Mitchelton–BikeExchange | + 1' 10" |
| 10 | Alvaro Duarte (COL) | Forca Amskins Racing | + 1' 10" |

=== Stage 5 ===
22 March 2018 — Bentong, Pahang to Cameron Highlands, Pahang, 169.4 km (105 mi)

Stage 5 Result
| Rank | Rider | Team | Time |
|---|---|---|---|
| 1 | Artem Ovechkin (RUS) | Terengganu Cycling Team | 4h 24' 29" |
| 2 | Benjamin Dyball (AUS) | St George Continental Cycling Team | + 28" |
| 3 | Amanuel Ghebreigzabhier (ERI) | Team Dimension Data | + 55" |
| 4 | Yevgeniy Gidich (KAZ) | Astana | + 1' 01" |
| 5 | Thomas Lebas (FRA) | Kinan Cycling Team | + 1' 01" |
| 6 | Alvaro Duarte (COL) | Forca Amskins Racing | + 1' 02" |
| 7 | Yecid Arturo Sierra (COL) | Team Manzana Postobón | + 1' 04" |
| 8 | Piotr Brozyna (POL) | CCC–Sprandi–Polkowice | + 1' 10" |
| 9 | Luca Raggio (ITA) | Wilier Triestina–Selle Italia | + 1' 10" |
| 10 | Metkel Eyob (ERI) | Terengganu Cycling Team | + 1' 10" |

General classification after Stage 5
| Rank | Rider | Team | Time |
|---|---|---|---|
| 1 | Artem Ovechkin (RUS) | Terengganu Cycling Team | 21h 21' 34" |
| 2 | Benjamin Dyball (AUS) | St George Continental Cycling Team | + 32" |
| 3 | Harry Sweeny (AUS) | Mitchelton–BikeExchange | + 59" |
| 4 | Amanuel Ghebreigzabhier (ERI) | Team Dimension Data | + 1' 01" |
| 5 | Yevgeniy Gidich (KAZ) | Astana | + 1' 07" |
| 6 | Thomas Lebas (FRA) | Kinan Cycling Team | + 1' 08" |
| 7 | Alvaro Duarte (COL) | Forca Amskins Racing | + 1' 10" |
| 8 | Metkel Eyob (ERI) | Terengganu Cycling Team | + 1' 20" |
| 9 | Piotr Brozyna (POL) | CCC–Sprandi–Polkowice | + 1' 20" |
| 10 | Luca Raggio (ITA) | Wilier Triestina–Selle Italia | + 1' 20" |

=== Stage 6 ===
23 March 2018 — Tapah, Perak to Tanjung Malim, Perak, 108.5 km (67 mi)

Stage 6 Result
| Rank | Rider | Team | Time |
|---|---|---|---|
| 1 | Luca Pacioni (ITA) | Wilier Triestina–Selle Italia | 2h 24' 55" |
| 2 | Riccardo Minali (ITA) | Astana | + 0" |
| 3 | Mohd Harrif Saleh (MAS) | Terengganu Cycling Team | + 0" |
| 4 | Andrea Guardini (ITA) | Bardiani–CSF | + 0" |
| 5 | Yevgeniy Gidich (KAZ) | Astana | + 0" |
| 6 | Paolo Simion (ITA) | Bardiani–CSF | + 0" |
| 7 | Matteo Malucelli (ITA) | Androni Giocattoli–Sidermec | + 0" |
| 8 | Szymon Sajnok (POL) | CCC–Sprandi–Polkowice | + 0" |
| 9 | Dylan Page (SWI) | Team Sapura Cycling | + 0" |
| 10 | Metkel Eyob (ERI) | Terengganu Cycling Team | + 0" |

General classification after Stage 6
| Rank | Rider | Team | Time |
|---|---|---|---|
| 1 | Artem Ovechkin (RUS) | Terengganu Cycling Team | 23h 46' 29" |
| 2 | Benjamin Dyball (AUS) | St George Continental Cycling Team | + 32" |
| 3 | Harry Sweeny (AUS) | Mitchelton–BikeExchange | + 59" |
| 4 | Amanuel Ghebreigzabhier (ERI) | Team Dimension Data | + 1' 00" |
| 5 | Yevgeniy Gidich (KAZ) | Astana | + 1' 05" |
| 6 | Thomas Lebas (FRA) | Kinan Cycling Team | + 1' 08" |
| 7 | Alvaro Duarte (COL) | Forca Amskins Racing | + 1' 10" |
| 8 | Metkel Eyob (ERI) | Terengganu Cycling Team | + 1' 20" |
| 9 | Piotr Brozyna (POL) | CCC–Sprandi–Polkowice | + 1' 20" |
| 10 | Luca Raggio (ITA) | Wilier Triestina–Selle Italia | + 1' 20" |

=== Stage 7 ===
24 March 2018 — Nilai, Negeri Sembilan to Muar, Johor, 222.4 km (138 mi)

Stage 7 Result
| Rank | Rider | Team | Time |
|---|---|---|---|
| 1 | Manuel Belletti (ITA) | Androni Giocattoli–Sidermec | 5h 08' 23" |
| 2 | Eugert Zhupa (ALB) | Wilier Triestina–Selle Italia | + 0" |
| 3 | Ruslan Tleubayev (KAZ) | Astana | + 0" |
| 4 | Dylan Page (SWI) | Team Sapura Cycling | + 0" |
| 5 | Jaco Venter (RSA) | Team Dimension Data | + 0" |
| 6 | Paolo Simion (ITA) | Bardiani–CSF | + 0" |
| 7 | Brendon Davids (RSA) | Bennelong SwissWellness Cycling Team | + 0" |
| 8 | Johann Van Zyl (RSA) | Team Dimension Data | + 0" |
| 9 | Lukasz Owsian (POL) | CCC–Sprandi–Polkowice | + 2" |
| 10 | Giuseppe Fonzi (ITA) | Wilier Triestina–Selle Italia | + 5" |

General classification after Stage 7
| Rank | Rider | Team | Time |
|---|---|---|---|
| 1 | Artem Ovechkin (RUS) | Terengganu Cycling Team | 28h 56' 20" |
| 2 | Lukasz Owsian (POL) | CCC–Sprandi–Polkowice | + 28" |
| 3 | Benjamin Dyball (AUS) | St George Continental Cycling Team | + 32" |
| 4 | Giuseppe Fonzi (ITA) | Wilier Triestina–Selle Italia | + 57" |
| 5 | Harry Sweeny (AUS) | Mitchelton–BikeExchange | + 59" |
| 6 | Amanuel Ghebreigzabhier (ERI) | Team Dimension Data | + 1' 00" |
| 7 | Yevgeniy Gidich (KAZ) | Astana | + 1' 02" |
| 8 | Brendon Davids (RSA) | Bennelong SwissWellness Cycling Team | + 1' 02" |
| 9 | Thomas Lebas (FRA) | Kinan Cycling Team | + 1' 08" |
| 10 | Alvaro Duarte (COL) | Forca Amskins Racing | + 1' 10" |

=== Stage 8 ===
25 March 2018 — Rembau, Negeri Sembilan to Kuala Lumpur, 141.1 km (88 mi)

Stage 8 Result
| Rank | Rider | Team | Time |
|---|---|---|---|
| 1 | Andrea Guardini (ITA) | Bardiani–CSF | 3h 10' 25" |
| 2 | Manuel Belletti (ITA) | Androni Giocattoli–Sidermec | + 0" |
| 3 | Luca Pacioni (ITA) | Wilier Triestina–Selle Italia | + 0" |
| 4 | Yevgeniy Gidich (KAZ) | Astana | + 0" |
| 5 | Marko Kump (SLO) | CCC–Sprandi–Polkowice | + 0" |
| 6 | Jordan Parra (COL) | Team Manzana Postobón | + 0" |
| 7 | Dylan Page (SWI) | Team Sapura Cycling | + 0" |
| 8 | Riccardo Minali (ITA) | Astana | + 0" |
| 9 | Giuseppe Fonzi (ITA) | Wilier Triestina–Selle Italia | + 0" |
| 10 | Sam Crome (AUS) | Bennelong SwissWellness Cycling Team | + 0" |

General classification after Stage 7
| Rank | Rider | Team | Time |
|---|---|---|---|
| 1 | Artem Ovechkin (RUS) | Terengganu Cycling Team | 32h 06' 45" |
| 2 | Łukasz Owsian (POL) | CCC–Sprandi–Polkowice | + 27" |
| 3 | Ben Dyball (AUS) | St George Continental Cycling Team | + 32" |
| 4 | Amanuel Gebrezgabihier (ERI) | Team Dimension Data | + 54" |
| 5 | Giuseppe Fonzi (ITA) | Wilier Triestina–Selle Italia | + 57" |
| 6 | Yevgeniy Gidich (KAZ) | Astana | + 1'02" |
| 7 | Brendon Davids (RSA) | Bennelong SwissWellness Cycling Team | + 1'02" |
| 8 | Thomas Lebas (FRA) | Kinan Cycling Team | + 1'08" |
| 9 | Álvaro Duarte (COL) | Forca Amskins Racing | + 1'10" |
| 10 | Harry Sweeny (AUS) | Mitchelton–BikeExchange | + 1'17" |

== Classification leadership table ==
| Stage | Winner | General classification | Points classification | Mountains classification | Asian rider classification | Team classification | Asian team classification |
|---|---|---|---|---|---|---|---|
| 1 | Andrea Guardini | Andrea Guardini | Andrea Guardini | Wang Bo | Seo Joon Yong | Androni Giocattoli–Sidermec | Terengganu Cycling Team |
| 2 | Riccardo Minali | Riccardo Minali | Riccardo Minali | Bernardo Suaza | Seo Joon Yong | Androni Giocattoli–Sidermec | Astana |
| 3 | Adam De Vos | Adam De Vos | Kim Dae-Yeon | Bernardo Suaza | Seo Joon Yong | Rally Cycling | Forca Amskins Racing |
| 4 | Riccardo Minali | Adam De Vos | Riccardo Minali | Bernardo Suaza | Nik Mohamad Azman Zulkifli | Rally Cycling | Forca Amskins Racing |
| 5 | Artem Ovechkin | Artem Ovechkin | Riccardo Minali | Artem Ovechkin | Yevgeniy Gidich | Terengganu Cycling Team | Terengganu Cycling Team |
| 6 | Luca Pacioni | Artem Ovechkin | Riccardo Minali | Artem Ovechkin | Yevgeniy Gidich | Terengganu Cycling Team | Terengganu Cycling Team |
| 7 | Manuel Belletti | Artem Ovechkin | Riccardo Minali | Artem Ovechkin | Yevgeniy Gidich | Wilier Triestina–Selle Italia | Astana |
| 8 | Andrea Guardini | Artem Ovechkin | Andrea Guardini | Alvaro Duarte | Yevgeniy Gidich | Wilier Triestina–Selle Italia | Astana |
| Final | | Artem Ovechkin | Andrea Guardini | Alvaro Duarte | Yevgeniy Gidich | Wilier Triestina–Selle Italia | Astana |

== Final standings ==
=== General classification ===
Final general classification
| Rank | Rider | Team | Time |
|---|---|---|---|
| 1 | Artem Ovechkin (RUS) | Terengganu Cycling Team | 32h 06' 45" |
| 2 | Łukasz Owsian (POL) | CCC–Sprandi–Polkowice | + 27" |
| 3 | Ben Dyball (AUS) | St George Continental Cycling Team | + 32" |
| 4 | Amanuel Gebrezgabihier (ERI) | Team Dimension Data | + 54" |
| 5 | Giuseppe Fonzi (ITA) | Wilier Triestina–Selle Italia | + 57" |
| 6 | Yevgeniy Gidich (KAZ) | Astana | + 1'02" |
| 7 | Brendon Davids (RSA) | Bennelong SwissWellness Cycling Team | + 1'02" |
| 8 | Thomas Lebas (FRA) | Kinan Cycling Team | + 1'08" |
| 9 | Álvaro Duarte (COL) | Forca Amskins Racing | + 1'10" |
| 10 | Harry Sweeny (AUS) | Mitchelton–BikeExchange | + 1'17" |

=== Points classification ===
Final points classification
| Rank | Rider | Team | Points |
|---|---|---|---|
| 1 | Andrea Guardini (ITA) | Bardiani–CSF | 61 |
| 2 | Riccardo Minali (ITA) | Astana | 58 |
| 3 | Luca Pacioni (ITA) | Wilier Triestina–Selle Italia | 44 |
| 4 | Manuel Belletti (ITA) | Androni Giocattoli–Sidermec | 42 |
| 5 | Yevgeniy Gidich (KAZ) | Astana | 42 |
| 6 | Paolo Simion (ITA) | Bardiani–CSF | 24 |
| 7 | Dylan Page (SUI) | Team Sapura Cycling | 22 |
| 8 | Harrif Saleh (MAS) | Terengganu Cycling Team | 22 |
| 9 | Amanuel Gebrezgabihier (ERI) | Team Dimension Data | 21 |
| 10 | Nik Mohamad Azman Zulkifli (MAS) | Forca Amskins Racing | 18 |

=== Mountains classification ===
Final mountains classification
| Rank | Rider | Team | Points |
|---|---|---|---|
| 1 | Álvaro Duarte (COL) | Forca Amskins Racing | 43 |
| 2 | Artem Ovechkin (RUS) | Terengganu Cycling Team | 40 |
| 3 | Bernardo Suaza (COL) | Team Manzana Postobón | 38 |
| 4 | Ben Dyball (AUS) | St George Continental Cycling Team | 24 |
| 5 | Marcelo Felipe (PHI) | 7 Eleven–Cliqq Roadbike Philippines | 18 |
| 6 | Juan Felipe Osorio (COL) | Team Manzana Postobón | 16 |
| 7 | Amanuel Gebrezgabihier (ERI) | Team Dimension Data | 16 |
| 8 | Yecid Sierra (COL) | Team Manzana Postobón | 13 |
| 9 | Yevgeniy Gidich (KAZ) | Astana | 12 |
| 10 | Muhammad Abdurrahman (INA) | KFC Cycling Team | 11 |

=== Asian rider classification ===
Final Asian rider classification
| Rank | Rider | Team | Time |
|---|---|---|---|
| 1 | Yevgeniy Gidich (KAZ) | Astana | 32h 07' 47" |
| 2 | Daniil Fominykh (KAZ) | Astana | + 55" |
| 3 | Marcelo Felipe (PHI) | 7 Eleven–Cliqq Roadbike Philippines | + 1' 25" |
| 4 | Ariya Phounsavath (LAO) | Thailand Continental Cycling Team | + 1' 28" |
| 5 | Peerapol Chawchiangkwang (THA) | Thailand Continental Cycling Team | + 2' 53" |
| 6 | Muhamad Zawawi Azman (MAS) | Team Sapura Cycling | + 3' 03" |
| 7 | Artyom Zakharov (KAZ) | Astana | + 3' 26" |
| 8 | Aiman Cahyadi (INA) | Team Sapura Cycling | + 15' 25" |
| 9 | Rustom Lim (PHI) | 7 Eleven–Cliqq Roadbike Philippines | + 16' 03" |
| 10 | Muhammad Nur Aiman Mohd Zariff (MAS) | Team Sapura Cycling | + 19' 05" |

=== Team classification ===
Final teams classification
| Rank | Team | Time |
|---|---|---|
| 1 | Wilier Triestina–Selle Italia | 96h 23' 38" |
| 2 | Astana | + 14" |
| 3 | Team Dimension Data | + 33" |
| 4 | Androni Giocattoli–Sidermec | + 39" |
| 5 | Team Sapura Cycling | + 1' 46" |
| 6 | Bennelong SwissWellness Cycling Team | + 15' 38" |
| 7 | Thailand Continental Cycling Team | + 18' 37" |
| 8 | CCC–Sprandi–Polkowice | + 19' 45" |
| 9 | Kinan Cycling Team | + 23' 23" |
| 10 | Team Manzana Postobón | + 24' 01" |

=== Asian team classification ===
Final Asian teams classification
| Rank | Team | Time |
|---|---|---|
| 1 | Astana | 96h 23' 52" |
| 2 | Team Sapura Cycling | + 1' 32" |
| 3 | Thailand Continental Cycling Team | + 18' 23" |
| 4 | Kinan Cycling Team | + 23' 09" |
| 5 | 7 Eleven–Cliqq Roadbike Philippines | + 36' 12" |
| 6 | Terengganu Cycling Team | + 37' 59" |
| 7 | Mitchelton–BikeExchange | + 54' 10" |
| 8 | Forca Amskins Racing | + 1h 10' 26" |
| 9 | KFC Cycling Team | + 1h 20' 11" |
| 10 | Malaysia | + 1h 59' 03" |

=== Riders who failed to finish ===
40 riders failed to finish the race.
| Rider | Team |
|---|---|
| Hiroshi Tsubaki (JPN) | Kinan Cycling Team |
| Liu Haiwang (CHN) | Giant Cycling Team |
| Li Jiabao (CHN) | Giant Cycling Team |
| Jiang Zhihui (CHN) | Mitchelton–BikeExchange |
| Scott Sunderland (AUS) | Bennelong SwissWellness Cycling Team |
| Chen Zhiwen (CHN) (Note: Chen was dismissed from the race by the tour's organizers after being found guilty of physically assaulting Mohd Hariff Saleh in an altercation after the end of Stage 3.) | Giant Cycling Team |
| Seo Joon Yong (KOR) | KSPO Bianchi Asia |
| Mekseb Debesay (ERI) | Team Dimension Data |
| Liu Manduo (CHN) | Giant Cycling Team |
| Juan Sebastián Molano (COL) | Team Manzana Postobón |
| Matteo Dal-Cin (CAN) | Rally Cycling |
| Muhammad Ameen Ahmad (MAS) | Malaysia |
| Kaden Groves (AUS) | St George Continental Cycling Team |
| Alan Banaszek (POL) | CCC–Sprandi–Polkowice |
| Yan Meng (CHN) | Giant Cycling Team |
| Zheng Zhang (CHN) | Giant Cycling Team |
| Charles Bradley Huff (USA) | Rally Cycling |
| Eric Young (USA) | Rally Cycling |
| Kim Dae Yeon (KOR) | KSPO Bianchi Asia |
| Choi Seung Woo (KOR) | KSPO Bianchi Asia |
| Kang Sukho (KOR) | KSPO Bianchi Asia |
| Daniel Ven Cariño (PHI) | 7 Eleven–Cliqq Roadbike Philippines |
| Marcos Garcia (ESP) | Kinan Cycling Team |
| Jay Dutton (AUS) | St George Continental Cycling Team |
| Mohd Elmi Jumari (MAS) | Malaysia |
| Simone Sterbini (ITA) | Bardiani–CSF |
| Loh Sea Keong (MAS) | Thailand Continental Cycling Team |
| Joseph Cooper (NZL) | Bennelong SwissWellness Cycling Team |
| Ma Guangtong (CHN) | Hengxiang Cycling Team |
| Wang Bo (CHN) | Hengxiang Cycling Team |
| Andris Vosekalns (LAT) | Hengxiang Cycling Team |
| Kyle Murphy (USA) | Rally Cycling |
| Park Sung Baek (KOR) | KSPO Bianchi Asia |
| Nic Dlamini (RSA) | Team Dimension Data |
| Metkel Eyob (ERI) | Terengganu Cycling Team |
| Genki Yamamoto (JPN) | Kinan Cycling Team |
| Muhammad Ameer Ahmad (MAS) | Malaysia |
| Luca Wackermann (ITA) | Bardiani–CSF |
| Phuchong Sai-Udomsin (THA) | Thailand Continental Cycling Team |
| Mohammad Saufi Mat Senan (MAS) | Forca Amskins Racing |
