= 2018 Tour of Iran (Azerbaijan) =

Tour of Iran (Azerbaijan) 2018
2018 UCI Asia Tour, race 33

Race details
- Dates: September 29 - October 4, 2018
- Stages: 6
- Distance: 1,017.0 km (631.9 mi)
- Winning time: 23:48:46

Results
	Winner	Dmitry Sokolov (RUS)	(Russia)
	Second	Meron Abraham (ERI)	(Bike Aid)
	Third	Venantas Lašinis (LTU)	(Staki–Technorama)

Tour of Iran (Azerbaijan) 2018 was a UCI Asia Tour 2.1 event and the 33rd edition of Tour of Iran (Azerbaijan) which took place in six stages between September 29-October 4, 2018 in Iranian Azerbaijan. The race started in the city of Tabriz and traveled through Urmia, Jolfa, and Sarein.

== Teams ==
Thirteen teams participated in the race. Each team had a maximum of six riders:

Continental teams

- Tarteletto–Isorex
- Tabriz Shahrdary Team
- Pishgaman Cycling Team
- AC Sparta Praha
- Vino–Astana Motors
- Staki–Technorama
- Alecto Cycling Team
- Bike Aid
- DFT Team
- Gun Ay Tabriz Team

National teams

- Azerbaijan
- Iran
- Russia

== Stages ==
=== Stage 1 ===
Tabriz – Urmia (150.1 km)

Stage 1 result

Rank	Rider	Team	Time
1	Mohammad Ganjkhanlou (IRN)	Pishgaman Cycling Team	3h 25' 10"
2	Meron Abraham (ERI)	Bike Aid	s.t.
3	Dmitri Sokolov (RUS)	Russia	s.t.
4	Arman Kamyshev (KAZ)	Vino–Astana Motors	s.t.
5	Clint Hendricks (RSA)	Bike Aid	s.t.
6	Rick Ottema (NED)	Alé–Cipollini	s.t.
7	Nikita Sokolov (KAZ)	Vino–Astana Motors	s.t.
8	Ylber Sefa (ALB)	Tarteletto–Isorex	s.t.
9	Jan Stöhr (CZE)	AC Sparta Praha	s.t.
10	Abram Stockman (BEL)	Tarteletto–Isorex	s.t.

General classification after Stage 1

Rank	Rider	Team	Time
1	Mohammad Ganjkhanlou (IRN)	Pishgaman Cycling Team	3h 24' 54"
2	Meron Abraham (ERI)	Bike Aid	+ 7"
3	Dmitri Sokolov (RUS)	Russia	+ 12"
4	Rick Ottema (NED)	Alé–Cipollini	+ 14"
5	Abram Stockman (BEL)	Tarteletto–Isorex	+ 15"
6	Arman Kamyshev (KAZ)	Vino–Astana Motors	+ 16"
7	Clint Hendricks (RSA)	Bike Aid	s.t.
8	Nikita Sokolov (KAZ)	Vino–Astana Motors	s.t.
9	Ylber Sefa (ALB)	Tarteletto–Isorex	s.t.
10	Jan Stöhr (CZE)	AC Sparta Praha	s.t.

=== Stage 2 ===
Urmia – Aras Free Zone (209.4 km)

Stage 2 result

Rank	Rider	Team	Time
1	Dmitri Sokolov (RUS)	Russia	5h 14' 51"
2	Mohammad Rajablou (IRN)	Iran	+ 1' 12"
3	Michiel Stockman (BEL)	Tarteletto–Isorex	s.t.
4	Savva Novikov (RUS)	Russia	+ 3' 26"
5	Marco Doets (NED)	Alé–Cipollini	+ 3' 31"
6	Mohammad Ganjkhanlou (IRN)	Pishgaman Cycling Team	s.t.
7	Ylber Sefa (ALB)	Tarteletto–Isorex	s.t.
8	Meron Abraham (ERI)	Bike Aid	s.t.
9	Venantas Lašinis (LTU)	Staki–Technorama	s.t.
10	Mehdi Sohrabi (IRN)	Pishgaman Cycling Team	s.t.

General classification after Stage 2

Rank	Rider	Team	Time
1	Dmitri Sokolov (RUS)	Russia	8h 39' 44"
2	Mohammad Ganjkhanlou (IRN)	Pishgaman Cycling Team	+ 3' 32"
3	Meron Abraham (ERI)	Bike Aid	+ 3' 39"
4	Rick Ottema (NED)	Alé–Cipollini	+ 3' 46"
5	Abram Stockman (BEL)	Tarteletto–Isorex	+ 3' 47"
6	Ylber Sefa (ALB)	Tarteletto–Isorex	+ 3' 48"
7	Clint Hendricks (RSA)	Bike Aid	s.t.
8	Jan Stöhr (CZE)	AC Sparta Praha	s.t.
9	Venantas Lašinis (LTU)	Staki–Technorama	s.t.
10	Arman Kamyshev (KAZ)	Vino–Astana Motors	s.t.

=== Stage 3 ===
Aras Free Zone – Tabriz (147.8 km)

Stage 3 result

Rank	Rider	Team	Time
1	Alexander Vdovin (RUS)	Russia	3h 34' 40"
2	Salim Kipkemboi (KEN)	Kenya	s.t.
3	Adne van Engelen (NED)	Bike Aid	+ 6"
4	Savva Novikov (RUS)	Russia	+ 15"
5	Niels De Rooze (BEL)	Tarteletto–Isorex	+ 29"
6	Sjors Dekker (NED)	Alé–Cipollini	+ 1' 01"
7	Amir Kolahdozhagh (IRN)	Pishgaman Cycling Team	s.t.
8	Saeid Safarzadeh (IRN)	Tabriz Shahrdary Team	s.t.
9	Mohammad Ganjkhanlou (IRN)	Pishgaman Cycling Team	+ 1' 10"
10	Clint Hendricks (RSA)	Bike Aid	s.t.

General classification after Stage 3

Rank	Rider	Team	Time
1	Dmitri Sokolov (RUS)	Russia	12h 15' 45"
2	Mohammad Ganjkhanlou (IRN)	Pishgaman Cycling Team	+ 3' 21"
3	Meron Abraham (ERI)	Bike Aid	+ 3' 28"
4	Abram Stockman (BEL)	Tarteletto–Isorex	+ 3' 36"
5	Clint Hendricks (RSA)	Bike Aid	+ 3' 37"
6	Jan Stöhr (CZE)	AC Sparta Praha	s.t.
7	Bahram Najafi (IRN)	Tabriz Shahrdary Team	s.t.
8	Nikita Sokolov (KAZ)	Vino–Astana Motors	+ 3' 42"
9	Ylber Sefa (ALB)	Tarteletto–Isorex	+ 3' 44"
10	Venantas Lašinis (LTU)	Staki–Technorama	s.t.

=== Stage 4 ===
Tabriz – Sarein (196.2 km)

Stage 4 result

Rank	Rider	Team	Time
1	Sjors Dekker (NED)	Alé–Cipollini	4h 12' 56"
2	Kevin De Jonghe (BEL)	Tarteletto–Isorex	+ 13"
3	Meron Abraham (ERI)	Bike Aid	+ 1' 42"
4	Amir Kolahdozhagh (IRN)	Pishgaman Cycling Team	s.t.
5	Saeid Safarzadeh (IRN)	Tabriz Shahrdary Team	s.t.
6	Savva Novikov (RUS)	Russia	+ 1' 49"
7	Rick Ottema (NED)	Alé–Cipollini	+ 1' 54"
8	Behnam Ariyan (IRN)	Pishgaman Cycling Team	s.t.
9	Clint Hendricks (RSA)	Bike Aid	s.t.
10	Yevgeniy Nepomnyachshiy (KAZ)	Vino–Astana Motors	s.t.

General classification after Stage 4

Rank	Rider	Team	Time
1	Dmitri Sokolov (RUS)	Russia	16h 30' 35"
2	Meron Abraham (ERI)	Bike Aid	+ 3' 12"
3	Abram Stockman (BEL)	Tarteletto–Isorex	+ 3' 36"
4	Clint Hendricks (RSA)	Bike Aid	+ 3' 37"
5	Jan Stöhr (CZE)	AC Sparta Praha	s.t.
6	Bahram Najafi (IRN)	Tabriz Shahrdary Team	s.t.
7	Nikita Sokolov (KAZ)	Vino–Astana Motors	+ 3' 42"
8	Ylber Sefa (ALB)	Tarteletto–Isorex	+ 3' 44"
9	Venantas Lašinis (LTU)	Staki–Technorama	s.t.
10	Hamid Beikkhormizi (IRN)	Pishgaman Cycling Team	s.t.

=== Stage 5 ===
Sarein – Tabriz (198.9 km)

Stage 5 result

Rank	Rider	Team	Time
1	Saeid Safarzadeh (IRN)	Tabriz Shahrdary Team	5h 10' 53"
2	Savva Novikov (RUS)	Russia	+ 11"
3	Jafar Alizadehchakhlou (IRN)	Tabriz Shahrdary Team	+ 19"
4	Folkert Oostra (NED)	Alé–Cipollini	+ 36"
5	Amir Kolahdozhagh (IRN)	Pishgaman Cycling Team	+ 38"
6	Meron Abraham (ERI)	Bike Aid	s.t.
7	Ruben Scheire (BEL)	Tarteletto–Isorex	+ 41"
8	Arvin Moazzami (IRN)	Pishgaman Cycling Team	+ 47"
9	Farhad Mokhtari (IRN)	Gun Ay Tabriz Team	+ 49"
10	Adne van Engelen (NED)	Bike Aid	+ 51"

General classification after Stage 5

Rank	Rider	Team	Time
1	Dmitri Sokolov (RUS)	Russia	21h 42' 42"
2	Meron Abraham (ERI)	Bike Aid	+ 2' 36"
3	Venantas Lašinis (LTU)	Staki–Technorama	+ 3' 24"
4	Nikita Sokolov (KAZ)	Vino–Astana Motors	+ 3' 36"
5	Folkert Oostra (NED)	Alé–Cipollini	+ 3' 39"
6	Jan Stöhr (CZE)	AC Sparta Praha	+ 3' 40"
7	Bahram Najafi (IRN)	Tabriz Shahrdary Team	+ 3' 44"
8	Hamid Beikkhormizi (IRN)	Pishgaman Cycling Team	+ 3' 46"
9	Ylber Sefa (ALB)	Tarteletto–Isorex	+ 3' 47"
10	Abram Stockman (BEL)	Tarteletto–Isorex	+ 3' 56"

=== Stage 6 ===
Tabriz – Tabriz (91.2 km)

Stage 6 result

Rank	Rider	Team	Time
1	Mohammad Ganjkhanlou (IRN)	Pishgaman Cycling Team	2h 06' 08"
2	Marco Doets (NED)	Alé–Cipollini	s.t.
3	Dmitri Sokolov (RUS)	Russia	s.t.
4	Olamaei Mahdi (IRN)	Iran	s.t.
5	Alexey Voloshin (KAZ)	Vino–Astana Motors	s.t.
6	Aleksandr Smirnov (RUS)	Russia	s.t.
7	Clint Hendricks (RSA)	Bike Aid	s.t.
8	Matthew Overste (NED)	Alé–Cipollini	s.t.
9	Bahram Najafi (IRN)	Tabriz Shahrdary Team	s.t.
10	Jan Stöhr (CZE)	AC Sparta Praha	s.t.

== Final standings ==
Final general classification

Rank	Rider	Team	Time
1	Dmitri Sokolov (RUS)	Russia	23h 48' 46"
2	Meron Abraham (ERI)	Bike Aid	+ 2' 40"
3	Venantas Lašinis (LTU)	Staki–Technorama	+ 3' 28"
4	Nikita Sokolov (KAZ)	Vino–Astana Motors	+ 3' 40"
5	Folkert Oostra (NED)	Alecto Cycling Team	+ 3' 43"
6	Jan Stöhr (CZE)	AC Sparta Praha	+ 3' 44"
7	Bahram Najafi (IRN)	Tabriz Shahrdary Team	+ 3' 48"
8	Hamid Beikkhormizi (IRN)	Pishgaman Cycling Team	+ 3' 50"
9	Ylber Sefa (ALB)	Tarteletto–Isorex	+ 3' 51"
10	Abram Stockman (BEL)	Tarteletto–Isorex	+ 4' 00"

Final mountains classification

Rank	Rider	Team	Points
1	Saeid Safarzadeh (IRN)	Tabriz Shahrdary Team	62
2	Jafar Alizadehchakhlou (IRN)	Tabriz Shahrdary Team	46
3	Amir Kolahdozhagh (IRN)	Pishgaman Cycling Team	39
4	Savva Novikov (RUS)	Russia	24
5	Adne van Engelen (NED)	Bike Aid	22
6	Hamid Beikkhormizi (IRN)	Pishgaman Cycling Team	22
7	Kevin De Jonghe (BEL)	Tarteletto–Isorex	13
8	Sjors Dekker (NED)	Alecto Cycling Team	12
9	Folkert Oostra (NED)	Alecto Cycling Team	11
10	Ylber Sefa (ALB)	Tarteletto–Isorex	10

Final team classification

Rank	Team	Time
1	Tarteletto–Isorex	71h 36' 58"
2	Russia	+ 2' 34"
3	Alecto Cycling Team	+ 2' 55"
4	Bike Aid	+ 3' 10"
5	Pishgaman Cycling Team	+ 3' 29"
6	AC Sparta Praha	+ 8' 48"
7	Vino–Astana Motors	+ 8' 54"
8	Tabriz Shahrdary Team	+ 9' 27"
9	Iran	+ 10' 27"
10	Gun Ay Tabriz Team	+ 1h 02' 46"
