= 2018 UCI Asia Tour =

- Fourteenth edition of the UCI Asia Tour

Details
- Dates: 28 October 2017–21 October 2018
- Location: Asia

The 2018 UCI Asia Tour was the 14th season of the UCI Asia Tour. The season began on 28 October 2017 with the Tour of Hainan and ended 21 October 2018.

The points leader, based on the cumulative results of previous races, wears the UCI Asia Tour cycling jersey.

Throughout the season, points are awarded to the top finishers of stages within stage races and the final general classification standings of each of the stage races and one-day events. The quality and complexity of a race also determines how many points are awarded to the top finishers, the higher the UCI rating of a race, the more points are awarded.

The UCI ratings from highest to lowest are as follows:

- Multi-day events: 2.HC, 2.1 and 2.2
- One-day events: 1.HC, 1.1 and 1.2

== Events ==
=== 2017 ===
Date	Race Name	Location	UCI Rating	Winner	Team	Ref
28 October–5 November	Tour of Hainan	China	2.HC	Jacopo Mosca (ITA)	Wilier Triestina–Selle Italia	
7–11 November	Tour of Malaysia	Malaysia	2.2	Cancelled		
8–12 November	Tour of Fuzhou	China	2.1	Jai Hindley (AUS)	Mitchelton Scott	
12 November	Tour de Okinawa	Japan	1.2	Junya Sano (JPN)	Matrix Powertag	
18–26 November	Tour de Singkarak	Indonesia	2.2	Khalil Khorshid (IRI)	Tabriz Shahrdary Team	
2–14 December	Tour of Quanzhou Bay	China	2.2	Max Stedman (GBR)	Bike Channel–Canyon	

=== 2018 ===
Date	Race Name	Location	UCI Rating	Winner	Team	Ref
24–27 January	Sharjah International Cycling Tour	United Arab Emirates	2.1	Javier Moreno (ESP)	Delko–Marseille Provence KTM	
25–28 January	Tour de Indonesia	Indonesia	2.1	Ariya Phounsavath (LAO)	Thailand Continental Cycling Team	
6–10 February	Dubai Tour	United Arab Emirates	2.HC	Elia Viviani (ITA)	Quick-Step Floors	
13–18 February	Tour of Oman	Oman	2.HC	Alexey Lutsenko (KAZ)	Astana	
11–15 March	Tour de Taiwan	Taiwan	2.1	Yukiya Arashiro (JPN)	Japan (national team)	
18–25 March	Tour de Langkawi	Malaysia	2.HC	Artem Ovechkin (RUS)	Terengganu Cycling Team	
23–25 March	Tour de Tochigi	Japan	2.2	Michael Potter (AUS)	ACA–Ride Sunshine Coast	
1–6 April	Tour of Thailand	Thailand	2.1	Ben Dyball (AUS)	St George Continental Cycling Team	
13–15 April	Tour de Lombok	Indonesia	2.2	Álvaro Duarte (COL)	Forca Amskins Racing	
27–29 April	Sri Lanka T-Cup	Sri Lanka	2.2	Yasuharu Nakajima (JPN)	Kinan Cycling Team	
20–23 May	Tour de Filipinas	Philippines	2.2	El Joshua Cariño (PHI)	Philippine Navy Standard Insurance	
20–27 May	Tour of Japan	Japan	2.1	Marcos García (ESP)	Kinan Cycling Team	
30 May–3 June	Tour de Korea	South Korea	2.1	Serghei Țvetcov (ROU)	UnitedHealthcare	
31 May–3 June	Tour de Kumano	Japan	2.2	Marc de Maar (NED)	Team UKYO	
22 July–4 August	Tour of Qinghai Lake	China	2.HC	Hernán Aguirre (COL)	Team Manzana Postobón	
3–5 September	Tour of Xingtai	China	2.2	Damiano Cima (ITA)	Nippo–Vini Fantini–Europa Ovini	
7–9 September	Tour de Hokkaido	Japan	2.2	Cancelled due to 2018 Hokkaido Eastern Iburi earthquake		
8–15 September	Tour of China I	China	2.1	Juan Sebastián Molano (COL)	Team Manzana Postobón	
18–21 September	Tour de Siak	Indonesia	2.2	Matthew Zenovich (NZL)	St George Continental Cycling Team	
17–23 September	Tour of China II	China	2.1	Alejandro Marque (POR)	Sporting / Tavira	
26–29 September	Tour de Ijen	Indonesia	2.2	Ben Dyball (AUS)	St George Continental Cycling Team	
29–30 September	Tour of Almaty	Kazakhstan	2.1	Davide Villella (ITA)	Astana	
29 September - 4 October	Tour of Iran	Iran	2.1	Dmitri Sokolov (RUS)	Lokosphinx	
2–6 October	Jelajah Malaysia	Malaysia	2.2	Cancelled due lack of sponsors		
6–13 October	Tour of Taihu Lake	China	2.1	Boris Vallée (BEL)	Wanty–Groupe Gobert	
14 October	Oita Urban Classic	Japan	1.2	Masahiro Ishigami (JPN)	Japan (national team)	
14 October	Hammer Hong Kong	Hong Kong	1.1	(Australia) Mitchelton–Scott		
21 October	Japan Cup	Japan	1.HC	Rob Power (AUS)	Mitchelton–Scott	
