= 2018 Dubai Tour =

2018 UCI Asia Tour

Race details
- Dates: 6–10 February 2018
- Stages: 5
- Distance: 841 km (522.6 mi)
- Winning time: 19h 05' 46"

Results
| Jersey awarded to the overall winner | Winner | Elia Viviani (ITA) | (Quick-Step Floors) |
| | Second | Magnus Cort Nielsen (DEN) | (Astana) |
| | Third | Sonny Colbrelli (ITA) | (Bahrain–Merida) |
| Jersey awarded to the points classification winner | Points | Elia Viviani (ITA) | (Quick-Step Floors) |
| Jersey awarded to the youth classification winner | Youth | Magnus Cort Nielsen (DEN) | (Astana) |
| | Sprints | Quentin Valognes (FRA) | (Team Novo Nordisk) |
| | Team | BMC Racing Team | |

The 2018 Dubai Tour was a road cycling stage race that took place in Dubai between 6 and 10 February 2018. It was the fifth edition of the Dubai Tour and was rated as a 2.HC event as part of the 2018 UCI Asia Tour.

== Route ==
Stage characteristics and winners
| Stage | Date | Course | Distance | Type | Stage winner |
|---|---|---|---|---|---|
| 1 | 6 February | Dubai to Palm Jumeirah | 167 km (104 mi) | Flat stage | Dylan Groenewegen (NED) |
| 2 | 7 February | Dubai to Ras Al Khaimah | 190 km (120 mi) | Flat stage | Elia Viviani (ITA) |
| 3 | 8 February | Dubai to Fujairah City | 180 km (110 mi) | Flat stage | Mark Cavendish (GBR) |
| 4 | 9 February | Dubai to Hatta | 172 km (107 mi) | Hilly stage | Sonny Colbrelli (ITA) |
| 5 | 10 February | Dubai to Dubai | 132 km (82 mi) | Flat stage | Elia Viviani (ITA) |

== Stages ==
=== Stage 1 ===
Stage 1 result

| Rank | Rider | Team | Time |
|---|---|---|---|
| 1 | Dylan Groenewegen (NED) | LottoNL–Jumbo | 3h 51' 35" |
| 2 | Magnus Cort (DEN) | Astana | s.t. |
| 3 | Elia Viviani (ITA) | Quick-Step Floors | s.t. |
| 4 | Alexander Kristoff (NOR) | UAE Team Emirates | s.t. |
| 5 | Nacer Bouhanni (FRA) | Cofidis | s.t. |
| 6 | Jacob Hennessy (GBR) | Mitchelton–BikeExchange | s.t. |
| 7 | Eric Young (USA) | Rally Cycling | s.t. |
| 8 | Sonny Colbrelli (ITA) | Bahrain–Merida | s.t. |
| 9 | Andrea Peron (ITA) | Team Novo Nordisk | s.t. |
| 10 | Loïc Vliegen (BEL) | BMC Racing Team | s.t. |

General classification after Stage 1

| Rank | Rider | Team | Time |
|---|---|---|---|
| 1 | Dylan Groenewegen (NED) | LottoNL–Jumbo | 3h 51' 25" |
| 2 | Magnus Cort (DEN) | Astana | + 4" |
| 3 | Elia Viviani (ITA) | Quick-Step Floors | + 6" |
| 4 | Nathan Van Hooydonck (BEL) | BMC Racing Team | + 7" |
| 5 | Alexander Kristoff (NOR) | UAE Team Emirates | + 10" |
| 6 | Nacer Bouhanni (FRA) | Cofidis | s.t. |
| 7 | Jacob Hennessy (GBR) | Mitchelton–BikeExchange | s.t. |
| 8 | Eric Young (USA) | Rally Cycling | s.t. |
| 9 | Sonny Colbrelli (ITA) | Bahrain–Merida | s.t. |
| 10 | Andrea Peron (ITA) | Team Novo Nordisk | s.t. |

=== Stage 2 ===
Stage 2 result

| Rank | Rider | Team | Time |
|---|---|---|---|
| 1 | Elia Viviani (ITA) | Quick-Step Floors | 4h 34' 31" |
| 2 | Dylan Groenewegen (NED) | LottoNL–Jumbo | s.t. |
| 3 | Riccardo Minali (ITA) | Astana | s.t. |
| 4 | Mark Cavendish (GBR) | Team Dimension Data | s.t. |
| 5 | John Degenkolb (GER) | Trek–Segafredo | s.t. |
| 6 | Magnus Cort (DEN) | Astana | s.t. |
| 7 | Alexander Kristoff (NOR) | UAE Team Emirates | s.t. |
| 8 | Jempy Drucker (LUX) | BMC Racing Team | s.t. |
| 9 | Sonny Colbrelli (ITA) | Bahrain–Merida | s.t. |
| 10 | Adam Blythe (GBR) | Aqua Blue Sport | s.t. |

General classification after Stage 2

| Rank | Rider | Team | Time |
|---|---|---|---|
| 1 | Dylan Groenewegen (NED) | LottoNL–Jumbo | 8h 25' 50" |
| 2 | Elia Viviani (ITA) | Quick-Step Floors | + 2" |
| 3 | Nathan Van Hooydonck (BEL) | BMC Racing Team | + 9" |
| 4 | Magnus Cort (DEN) | Astana | + 10" |
| 5 | Riccardo Minali (ITA) | Astana | + 12" |
| 6 | Alexander Kristoff (NOR) | UAE Team Emirates | + 16" |
| 7 | Nacer Bouhanni (FRA) | Cofidis | s.t. |
| 8 | Sonny Colbrelli (ITA) | Bahrain–Merida | s.t. |
| 9 | John Degenkolb (GER) | Trek–Segafredo | s.t. |
| 10 | Jacob Hennessy (GBR) | Mitchelton–BikeExchange | s.t. |

=== Stage 3 ===
Race leader Dylan Groenewegen received a 20-second penalty for sheltering too long behind a team car.

Stage 3 result

| Rank | Rider | Team | Time |
|---|---|---|---|
| 1 | Mark Cavendish (GBR) | Team Dimension Data | 3h 53' 46" |
| 2 | Nacer Bouhanni (FRA) | Cofidis | s.t. |
| 3 | Marcel Kittel (GER) | Team Katusha–Alpecin | s.t. |
| 4 | Adam Blythe (GBR) | Aqua Blue Sport | s.t. |
| 5 | Sonny Colbrelli (ITA) | Bahrain–Merida | s.t. |
| 6 | Elia Viviani (ITA) | Quick-Step Floors | s.t. |
| 7 | Alexander Kristoff (NOR) | UAE Team Emirates | s.t. |
| 8 | Magnus Cort (DEN) | Astana | s.t. |
| 9 | Riccardo Minali (ITA) | Astana | s.t. |
| 10 | Dylan Groenewegen (NED) | LottoNL–Jumbo | s.t. |

General classification after Stage 3

| Rank | Rider | Team | Time |
|---|---|---|---|
| 1 | Elia Viviani (ITA) | Quick-Step Floors | 12h 19' 38" |
| 2 | Mark Cavendish (GBR) | Team Dimension Data | + 4" |
| 3 | Nathan Van Hooydonck (BEL) | BMC Racing Team | + 7" |
| 4 | Magnus Cort (DEN) | Astana | + 8" |
| 5 | Nacer Bouhanni (FRA) | Cofidis | s.t. |
| 6 | Loïc Vliegen (BEL) | BMC Racing Team | s.t. |
| 7 | Marcel Kittel (GER) | Team Katusha–Alpecin | + 10" |
| 8 | Riccardo Minali (ITA) | Astana | s.t. |
| 9 | Alexander Kristoff (NOR) | UAE Team Emirates | + 14" |
| 10 | Sonny Colbrelli (ITA) | Bahrain–Merida | s.t. |

=== Stage 4 ===
Stage 4 result

| Rank | Rider | Team | Time |
|---|---|---|---|
| 1 | Sonny Colbrelli (ITA) | Bahrain–Merida | 3h 40' 50" |
| 2 | Magnus Cort (DEN) | Astana | s.t. |
| 3 | Timo Roosen (NED) | LottoNL–Jumbo | s.t. |
| 4 | Alexander Kristoff (NOR) | UAE Team Emirates | s.t. |
| 5 | Giacomo Nizzolo (ITA) | Trek–Segafredo | s.t. |
| 6 | Elia Viviani (ITA) | Quick-Step Floors | s.t. |
| 7 | Tom Bohli (SUI) | BMC Racing Team | s.t. |
| 8 | Nacer Bouhanni (FRA) | Cofidis | s.t. |
| 9 | Loïc Vliegen (BEL) | BMC Racing Team | s.t. |
| 10 | Nathan Van Hooydonck (BEL) | BMC Racing Team | s.t. |

General classification after Stage 4

| Rank | Rider | Team | Time |
|---|---|---|---|
| 1 | Elia Viviani (ITA) | Quick-Step Floors | 16h 00' 28" |
| 2 | Magnus Cort (DEN) | Astana | + 2" |
| 3 | Sonny Colbrelli (ITA) | Bahrain–Merida | + 4" |
| 4 | Nathan Van Hooydonck (BEL) | BMC Racing Team | + 7" |
| 5 | Nacer Bouhanni (FRA) | Cofidis | + 8" |
| 6 | Loïc Vliegen (BEL) | BMC Racing Team | s.t. |
| 7 | Timo Roosen (NED) | LottoNL–Jumbo | + 10" |
| 8 | Alexander Kristoff (NOR) | UAE Team Emirates | + 14" |
| 9 | Jempy Drucker (LUX) | BMC Racing Team | s.t. |
| 10 | Dylan Teuns (BEL) | BMC Racing Team | s.t. |

=== Stage 5 ===
Stage 5 result

| Rank | Rider | Team | Time |
|---|---|---|---|
| 1 | Elia Viviani (ITA) | Quick-Step Floors | 3h 05' 28" |
| 2 | Marco Haller (AUT) | Team Katusha–Alpecin | s.t. |
| 3 | Adam Blythe (GBR) | Aqua Blue Sport | s.t. |
| 4 | Jempy Drucker (LUX) | BMC Racing Team | s.t. |
| 5 | Rick Zabel (GER) | Team Katusha–Alpecin | s.t. |
| 6 | Marcel Kittel (GER) | Team Katusha–Alpecin | s.t. |
| 7 | Sonny Colbrelli (ITA) | Bahrain–Merida | s.t. |
| 8 | Magnus Cort (DEN) | Astana | s.t. |
| 9 | Andrea Peron (ITA) | Team Novo Nordisk | s.t. |
| 10 | Fabio Sabatini (ITA) | Quick-Step Floors | s.t. |

== Classification leadership table ==
In the 2018 Dubai Tour, four different jerseys were awarded. For the general classification, calculated by adding each cyclist's finishing times on each stage, and allowing time bonuses for the first three finishers at intermediate sprints and at the finish of mass-start stages, the leader received a blue jersey. This classification was considered the most important of the 2018 Dubai Tour, and the winner of the classification was considered the winner of the race.

Additionally, there was a points classification, which awarded a red jersey. In the points classification, cyclists received points for finishing in the top 10 in a stage. For winning a stage, a rider earned 25 points, with 16 for second, 11 for third, 8 for fourth, 6 for fifth with a point fewer per place down to a single point for 10th place. Points towards the classification could also be accrued at intermediate sprint points during each stage; these intermediate sprints also offered bonus seconds towards the general classification. There was also a sprints classification for the points awarded at the aforementioned intermediate sprints, where the leadership of which was marked by a jersey in the colours of the United Arab Emirates flag.

The fourth jersey represented the young rider classification, marked by a white jersey. This was decided in the same way as the general classification, but only riders born after 1 January 1993 were eligible to be ranked in the classification.

| Stage | Winner | General classification | Points classification | Intermediate sprints classification | Youth classification |
|---|---|---|---|---|---|
| 1 | Dylan Groenewegen | Dylan Groenewegen | Dylan Groenewegen | Daniel Teklehaimanot | Dylan Groenewegen |
| 2 | Elia Viviani | Dylan Groenewegen | Dylan Groenewegen | Nathan Van Hooydonck | Dylan Groenewegen |
| 3 | Mark Cavendish | Elia Viviani | Dylan Groenewegen | Nathan Van Hooydonck | Nathan Van Hooydonck |
| 4 | Sonny Colbrelli | Elia Viviani | Elia Viviani | Nathan Van Hooydonck | Magnus Cort Nielsen |
| 5 | Elia Viviani | Elia Viviani | Elia Viviani | Quentin Valognes | Magnus Cort Nielsen |
| Final | | Elia Viviani | Elia Viviani | Quentin Valognes | Magnus Cort Nielsen |

== Final classifications ==
Final general classification

| Rank | Rider | Team | Time |
|---|---|---|---|
| 1 | Elia Viviani (ITA) | Quick-Step Floors | 19h 05' 46" |
| 2 | Magnus Cort (DEN) | Astana | + 12" |
| 3 | Sonny Colbrelli (ITA) | Bahrain–Merida | + 14" |
| 4 | Nathan Van Hooydonck (BEL) | BMC Racing Team | + 17" |
| 5 | Loïc Vliegen (BEL) | BMC Racing Team | + 18" |
| 6 | Nacer Bouhanni (FRA) | Cofidis | s.t. |
| 7 | Timo Roosen (NED) | LottoNL–Jumbo | + 20" |
| 8 | Jempy Drucker (LUX) | BMC Racing Team | + 24" |
| 9 | Alexander Kristoff (NOR) | UAE Team Emirates | s.t. |
| 10 | Rick Zabel (GER) | Team Katusha–Alpecin | s.t. |

Final points classification

| Rank | Rider | Team | Points |
|---|---|---|---|
| 1 | Elia Viviani (ITA) | Quick-Step Floors | 71 |
| 2 | Magnus Cort (DEN) | Astana | 43 |
| 3 | Dylan Groenewegen (NED) | LottoNL–Jumbo | 42 |
| 4 | Sonny Colbrelli (ITA) | Bahrain–Merida | 40 |
| 5 | Mark Cavendish (GBR) | Team Dimension Data | 33 |
| 6 | Nacer Bouhanni (FRA) | Cofidis | 25 |
| 7 | Alexander Kristoff (NOR) | UAE Team Emirates | 24 |
| 8 | Adam Blythe (GBR) | Aqua Blue Sport | 20 |
| 9 | Marcel Kittel (GER) | Team Katusha–Alpecin | 16 |
| 10 | Marco Haller (AUT) | Team Katusha–Alpecin | 16 |

Final young rider classification

| Rank | Rider | Team | Time |
|---|---|---|---|
| 1 | Magnus Cort (DEN) | Astana | 19h 05' 58" |
| 2 | Nathan Van Hooydonck (BEL) | BMC Racing Team | + 5" |
| 3 | Loïc Vliegen (BEL) | BMC Racing Team | + 6" |
| 4 | Timo Roosen (NED) | LottoNL–Jumbo | + 8" |
| 5 | Rick Zabel (GER) | Team Katusha–Alpecin | + 12" |
| 6 | Brandon McNulty (USA) | Rally Cycling | + 22" |
| 7 | Amund Grøndahl Jansen (NOR) | LottoNL–Jumbo | + 59" |
| 8 | Nazaerbieke Bieken (PRC) | Mitchelton–BikeExchange | + 2' 23" |
| 9 | Nils Politt (GER) | Team Katusha–Alpecin | s.t. |
| 10 | Samuel Jenner (AUS) | Mitchelton–BikeExchange | + 3' 11" |
