= Trofeo Città di Castelfidardo =

Race details
- Date: May
- Region: Italy
- Discipline: Road race
- Competition: UCI Europe Tour
- Type: Single day race

History
- First edition: 1981
- Editions: 43 (as of 2026)
- First winner: Giuseppe Petito (ITA)
- Most wins: Albert Destro (ITA) (2 wins)
- Most recent: Marco Manenti (ITA)

The Trofeo Città di Castelfidardo is a professional one day cycling race held annually in Italy. It was part of UCI Europe Tour in category 1.1 in 2005 and 2006 and 1.2 in 2008. The race returned to the national amateur calendar in 2011 after being cancelled in 2009 and 2010. It was reinstated as a 1.2 event on the UCI Europe Tour in 2023.

Together with the Gran Premio Santa Rita, it forms the Due Giorni Marchigiana, which awards a prize to the best rider between the two races.

== Winners ==
| Year | Winner | Second | Third |
|---|---|---|---|
| 1981 | (Italy) Giuseppe Petito | | |
| 1982 | (Italy) Giocondo Dalla Rizza | | |
| 1983 | (Italy) Antonioli | | |
| 1984 | (Italy) Federico Ghiotto | | |
| 1985 | (Italy) Marco Saligari | | |
| 1986 | (Italy) Alberto Destro | | |
| 1987 | (Italy) Silvano Lorenzon | | |
| 1988 | (Italy) Mario Cipollini | | |
| 1989 | (Italy) Massimiliano Lunardini | | |
| 1990 | (Italy) Fabio Baldato | | |
| 1991 | (Italy) Flavio Anastasia | | |
| 1992 | (Italy) Alberto Destro | | |
| 1993 | (Italy) Nicola Loda | | |
| 1994 | (Italy) Christian Leone | | |
| 1995 | (Italy) Biagio Conte | | |
| 1996 | (Italy) Moreno Di Biase | | |
| 1997 | (Italy) Daniele Trento | | |
| 1998 | (Italy) Alessio Girelli | | |
| 1999 | (Italy) Nicola Chesini | | |
| 2000 | (Italy) Luigi Giambelli | | |
| 2001 | (Slovenia) Boštjan Mervar | | |
| 2002 | (Italy) Fabio Sacchi | (Italy) Simone Masciarelli | (Italy) Paolo Bossoni |
| 2003 | (Italy) Michele Gobbi | (Italy) Antonio Bucciero | (Italy) Eddy Serri |
| 2004 | (Italy) Emanuele Sella | (Slovenia) Boštjan Mervar | (Austria) Gerrit Glomser |
| 2005 | (Brazil) Murilo Fischer | (Italy) Giuliano Figueras | (Italy) Elio Aggiano |
| 2006 | (Italy) Paolo Bossoni | (Italy) Alessandro Bertolini | (Italy) Eddy Serri |
| 2007 | (Italy) Maurizio Girardini | (Uzbekistan) Vladimir Tuychiev | (Italy) Francesco De Bonis |
| 2008 | (Italy) Adriano Malori | (Kazakhstan) Alexsandr Dyachenko | (Italy) Luca Gasparini |
| 2009-10 | No race | | |
| 2011 | (Italy) Moreno Moser | (Italy) Manuel Senni | (Italy) Maurizio Anzalone |
| 2012 | (Romania) Andrei Nechita | (Italy) Luca Orlandi | (Italy) Matteo Mammini |
| 2013 | (Italy) Matteo Collodel | (Italy) Andrea Fedi | (Italy) Giuseppe Fonzi |
| 2014 | (Italy) Jakub Mareczko | (Italy) Nicolas Marini | (Italy) Luca Pacioni |
| 2015 | (Italy) Luca Pacioni | (Italy) Marco Maronese | (Italy) Riccardo Minali |
| 2016 | (Italy) Riccardo Minali | (Italy) Francesco Lamon | (Italy) Filippo Ganna |
| 2017 | (Italy) Imerio Cima | (Italy) Mattia De Mori | (Italy) Nicolò Rocchi |
| 2018 | (Italy) Moreno Marchetti | (Italy) Giovanni Lonardi | (Italy) Gianmarco Begnoni |
| 2019 | (Italy) Gianmarco Begnoni | (Italy) Enrico Zanoncello | (Russia) Sergej Rostovcev |
| 2020 | No race | | |
| 2021 | (Italy) Cristian Rocchetta | (Italy) Nicolo Pencedano | (Italy) Filippo Stocco |
| 2022 | (Italy) Alberto Bruttomesso | (Italy) Cristian Rocchetta | (Italy) Carloalberto Giordani |
| 2023 | (Italy) Matteo Pongiluppi | (Italy) Attilio Viviani | (Italy) Alessandro Motta |
| 2024 | (Italy) Francesco Della Lunga | (Italy) Attilio Viviani | (Italy) Riccardo Perani |
| 2025 | (Italy) Tommaso Dati | (Italy) Lorenzo Quartucci | (Chile) Vicente Rojas |
| 2026 | (Italy) Marco Manenti | (Italy) Davide Boscaro | (Italy) Riccardo Fabbro |
