= Eddy Serri =

Italian cyclist

Personal information
- Born: 23 November 1974 (age 51) Faenza, Italy

Cycling career
- Sport: Cycling
- Current team: Retired
- Discipline: Road
- Role: Rider

Professional teams
- 2000–2002: Alexia Alluminio
- 2003: Mercatone Uno–Scanavino
- 2004–2005: Barloworld
- 2006–2008: Miche
- 2009: Meridiana–Kalev Chocolate

Eddy Serri (born 23 November 1974 in Faenza) is an Italian former cyclist. he most notably won the 2007 Giro della Romagna as well as rode in the 2001 and 2002 Giro d'Italia.

== Major results ==
1996
1st Stage 1 Girobio
2000
1st GP Città di Rio Saliceto e Correggio
2001
7th Grand Prix Pino Cerami
9th GP de la Ville de Rennes
2003
1st Stage 2 Ster Elektrotoer
2nd Giro della Romagna
2nd Criterium d'Abruzzo
3rd Trofeo Città di Castelfidardo
6th Coppa Bernocchi
6th GP Nobili Rubinetterie
6th Trofeo Matteotti
2005
6th Druivenkoers-Overijse
8th Grand Prix de Fourmies
10th Grand Prix Pino Cerami
2006
3rd Trofeo Città di Castelfidardo
2007
1st Giro della Romagna
2008
1st Giro del Mendrisiotto
9th GP Kranj
