= Mohammad Ganjkhanlou =

Iranian cyclist (born 1997)

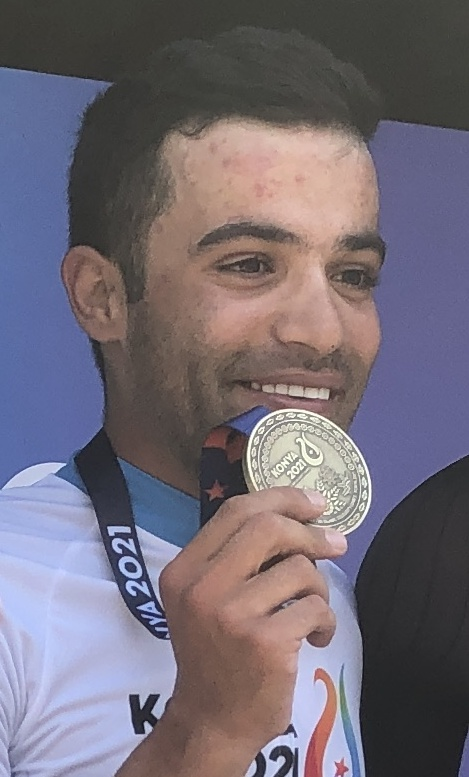
- Mohammad Ganjkhanlou

Personal information
- Full name: Mohammad Ganjkhanlou
- Nickname: Cheetah
- Born: 4 July 1997 (age 29) Tehran, Iran
- Height: 177 cm (5 ft 10 in)
- Weight: 70 kg (154 lb)

Cycling career
- Sport: Cycling
- Current team: Reading CC
- Disciplines: Road; Track
- Role: Rider
- Rider type: Sprinter

Amateur teams
- 2020: Istanbul Regional Team
- 2024–: Reading CC

Professional teams
- 2016: Tabriz Petrochemical CCN Team
- 2016–2018: Pishgaman–Giant
- 2019: Foolad Mobarakeh Sepahan
- 2021: Foolad Mobarakeh Sepahan
- 2022–2023: Azad University Team
Medal record
Representing Iran
Men's track cycling
Asian Championships
Gold medal – first place	2023 Nilai	Scratch
Bronze medal – third place	2022 New Delhi	Omnium
Bronze medal – third place	2022 New Delhi	Scratch
Islamic Solidarity Games
Gold medal – first place	2021 Konya	Road race

Mohammad Ganjkhanlou (Persian: محمد گنج خانلو; born 4 July 1997) is an Iranian cyclist, who currently rides for British club team Reading CC.

== Major results ==
2015
National Junior Road Championships

1st Road race
2nd Time trial

Asian Junior Road Championships

3rd Time trial
5th Road race

2016
National Road Championships

1st Under-23 road race
3rd Road race
3rd Under-23 time trial

3rd Road race, Asian Under-23 Road Championships
2017
3rd Road race, Asian Under-23 Road Championships
4th Time trial, National Road Championships
2018
Tour of Iran (Azerbaijan)

1st Stages 1 & 6
1st Points classification

2nd Road race, Asian Under-23 Road Championships
6th Overall Tour of Mevlana

1st Points classification
1st Stage 3

2019
1st Road race, Asian Under-23 Road Championships
National Under-23 Road Championships

1st Road race
2nd Time trial

1st Stage 7 Tour de Singkarak
2nd Overall Tour de Siak
2021
2nd Road race, National Road Championships
5th Grand Prix Erciyes
2022
1st Road race, Islamic Solidarity Games
Asian Road Championships

3rd Team time trial
9th Road race

Asian Track Championships

3rd Omnium
3rd Scratch

2023
1st Scratch, Asian Track Championships
6th Road race, Asian Road Championships
