= Nathan Van Hooydonck =

Belgian cyclist

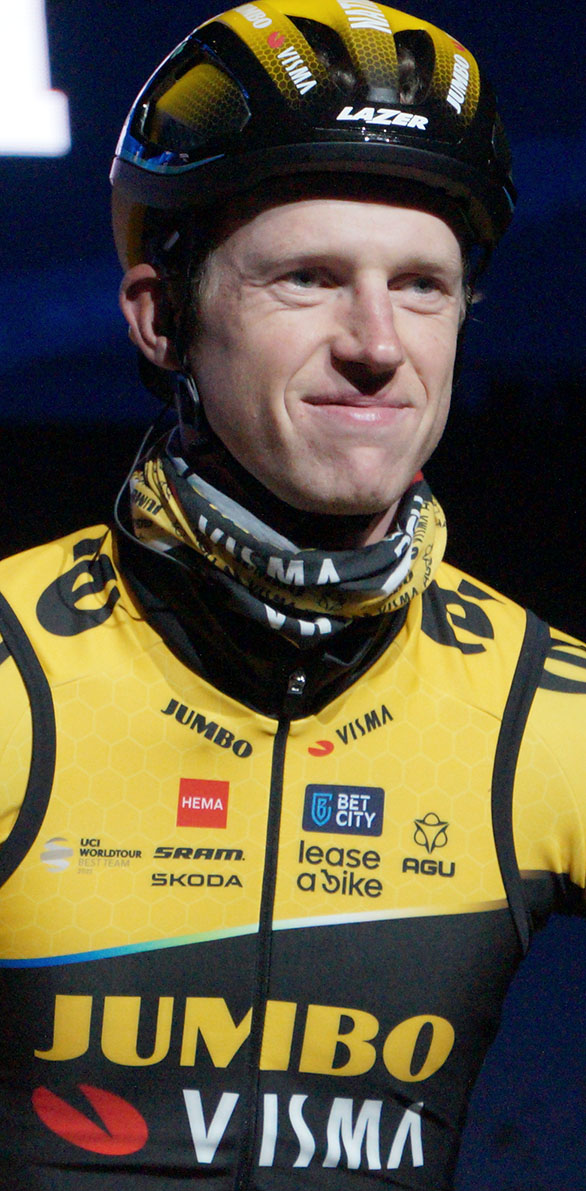
- Van Hooydonck in 2023

Personal information
- Full name: Nathan Van Hooydonck
- Born: October 12, 1995 (age 31) Gooreind, Wuustwezel, Belgium
- Height: 1.92 m (6 ft 4 in)
- Weight: 78 kg (172 lb)

Cycling career
- Sport: Cycling
- Current team: Retired
- Discipline: Road
- Role: Rider
- Rider type: Rouleur; Classics specialist

Amateur team
- 2015–2017: BMC Development Team

Professional teams
- 2014: Bissell Development Team
- 2017–2020: BMC Racing Team
- 2021–2023: Team Jumbo–Visma

Nathan Van Hooydonck (born 12 October 1995) is a retired Belgian road racing cyclist who competed for teams including Bissell Development Team, BMC Racing Team and Team Jumbo–Visma between 2014 and 2023. He rode in support of the race winner in both the Vuelta a España and Tour de France.

== Career ==
Van Hooydonck joined Bissell Development Team in 2014 aged eighteen. Bissel, managed by Axel Merckx, was registered as a professional team riding at UCI Continental level and Van Hooydonck rode in a mix of pro and junior events. Future Giro d'Italia champion Tao Geoghegan Hart was a teammate.

He joined BMC Racing Team feeder squad BMC Development Team in 2015. Although the team was registered as an amateur team, it also accepted invitations to compete in professional events. Van Hooydonck was promoted to the full BMC Racing Team in 2017 and spent four years with the senior squad. In August 2019, he was named in the startlist for his first Grand Tour race, the 2019 Vuelta a España.

In 2021, he signed for Team Jumbo–Visma and entered his second Vuelta in his first year with the team. He rode in support of Primož Roglič, who won the race. He was named to the team for the 2022 Tour de France and ended up playing an important role. Between Roglič, Jonas Vingegaard and Wout van Aert fighting for stage wins, jerseys and the Tour de France itself, Van Hooydonck was one of the key domestiques for the team. He left the race two stages before the end for personal reasons with race leader Vingegaard holding on to take the overall win.

== Major results ==
Van Hooydonck took one individual victory in a professional race, winning stage four at the 2016 Ronde de l'Oise on the UCI Europe Tour. He was part of the team time trial victory for Team Jumbo–Visma on stage three of 2023 Paris–Nice, and finished second to teammate Tiesj Benoot at Kuurne-Brussel-Kuurne in the same year.

He was the 2015 Belgian National Under-23 Road Race Champion and had a best finish of fifth in the senior race, achieved in 2017. He was awarded the Crystal Drop of Sweat in 2023, an annual prize given to the best domestique or supporting rider from Belgium.

== Retirement ==
On 12 September 2023, Van Hooydonck suffered a medical issue while driving and was involved in a traffic accident. His pregnant wife was a passenger in the car but was uninjured. Jonas Vingegaard won the stage of the Vuelta a España that was held that day and dedicated the win to his teammate. On 20 September, it was announced that an implantable cardioverter-defibrillator (ICD) had been fitted due to an irregularity of the cardiac wall, which if left untreated would put him at risk of arrhythmia. This brought his professional cycling career to an end at the age of twenty-seven.

Van Hooydonck remained with Visma–Lease a Bike after retiring from cycling, initially as a driver in the hospitality team before moving into a commercial role. He combines this with media work and provides commentary and in-studio punditry during TNT Sports coverage of major races.

== Personal life ==
He is the son of former professional cyclist Gino and the nephew of two-time Tour of Flanders winner Edwig Van Hooydonck.

Van Hooydonck is married to Alicia Cara. The couple has a son and a daughter.

== Major results ==
2012
2nd Road race, National Junior Road Championships
3rd Ronde van Vlaanderen Juniores
4th Omloop der Vlaamse Gewesten
6th Time trial, UCI Junior Road World Championships
2013
1st Overall Keizer der Juniores
2nd Time trial, National Junior Road Championships
2nd Paris–Roubaix Juniors
3rd La Philippe Gilbert
3rd Omloop der Vlaamse Gewesten
4th Overall GP Général Patton
4th Ronde van Vlaanderen Juniores
7th Overall Course de la Paix Juniors
2015
National Under-23 Road Championships

1st Road race
2nd Time trial

3rd Overall Olympia's Tour

1st Young rider classification

8th Paris–Tours Espoirs
2016
2nd Kernen Omloop Echt-Susteren
3rd Overall Ronde de l'Oise

1st Young rider classification
1st Stage 4

3rd Chrono Champenois
4th Overall Tour de Berlin

1st Stage 1 (TTT)

4th Circuit de Wallonie
5th Time trial, UEC European Under-23 Road Championships
5th Omloop Het Nieuwsblad Beloften
6th Internationale Wielertrofee Jong Maar Moedig
9th Overall Le Triptyque des Monts et Châteaux
2017
5th Road race, National Road Championships
5th Paris–Roubaix Espoirs
2018
4th Overall Dubai Tour
2021
7th Gent–Wevelgem
2023
1st Stage 3 (TTT) Paris–Nice
2nd Kuurne–Brussels–Kuurne

=== Grand Tour general classification results timeline ===
Grand Tour	2019	2020	2021	2022	2023
Giro d'Italia	—	—	—	—	—
Tour de France	—	—	—	DNF	93
Vuelta a España	114	—	82	—	—

Legend
—	Did not compete
DNF	Did not finish
