= Tour de Lombok Mandalika =

Race details
- Date: April
- Region: Lombok
- Nickname(s): TDLM
- Discipline: Road
- Competition: UCI Asia Tour
- Type: Stage race
- Web site: tourdelombok.id

History
- First edition: 2017
- Editions: 2 (as of 2018)
- First winner: Nathan Earle (AUS)
- Most wins: No repeat winners
- Most recent: Álvaro Duarte (COL)

The Tour de Lombok Mandalika (abbreviated TDLM) is a multi-day cycling race on the Indonesian island of Lombok. It is part of UCI Asia Tour in category 2.2. The tour covers routes that include cultural and tourist spots in Kuta, Mandalika, and Mataram in Lombok.

== Winners ==
Year	Country	Rider	Team
2017	Australia	Nathan Earle	Team Ukyo
2018	Colombia	Álvaro Duarte	Forca Amskins Racing

== 2017 Tour de Lombok ==
Cyclists from 19 countriesincluding Indonesia, Malaysia, New Zealand and Spain participated in the Tour De Lombok (TDLM) 2017, which was held from April 13 to 16. It was divided into four stages in 485.6 kilometers.

- The first leg of the race took riders from the governor's office in Mataram, the capital city of West Nusa Tenggara, to Kuta Beach in Central Lombok with a total distance of 126.3 kilometers.
- The second leg had the cyclists racing over 113.3 kilometers from Bangsal to Senaru in North Lombok.
- The third leg covered 112.1 kilometers from Kuta Beach to Sembalun in Central Lombok.
- The fourth and final leg was a 112-kilometer circuit race consisting of 10 laps in Mataram city.

== 2018 Tour de Lombok ==
Cyclists from 18 countries participated the event which was held from April 13 to 15. It was the second edition of the annual event. The race consisted of three stages:

- Stage I: 84.4-km Kuta Mandalika-Kota Mataram route,
- Stage II: 172.4-km Mataram-Sembalun route in East Lombok, and
- Stage II: 110-km Kota Mataram circuit race.
