= Luca Pacioni =

Italian cyclist

Personal information
- Full name: Luca Pacioni
- Born: 13 August 1993 (age 33) Gatteo, Italy
- Height: 1.75 m (5 ft 9 in)
- Weight: 67 kg (148 lb)

Cycling career
- Sport: Cycling
- Current team: GW Erco SportFitness
- Discipline: Road
- Role: Rider
- Rider type: Sprinter

Amateur teams
- 2012–2014: Team Colpack
- 2015: Viris Maserati–Sisal Matchpoint

Professional teams
- 2015: Lampre–Merida (stagiaire)
- 2016–2017: Androni Giocattoli–Sidermec
- 2018–2019: Wilier Triestina–Selle Italia
- 2020: Androni Giocattoli–Sidermec
- 2021–: Eolo–Kometa

Luca Pacioni (born 13 August 1993) is an Italian cyclist who rides for UCI ProTeam Team Polti VisitMalta.

== Major results ==
2014
3rd Trofeo Città di Castelfidardo
2015
1st Trofeo Città di Castelfidardo
2nd Circuito del Porto
7th Gran Premio della Liberazione
2017
4th Overall Tour of China I

1st Stage 1

10th Paris–Camembert
2018
1st Stage 6 Tour de Langkawi
1st Stage 5 Tour de Taiwan
1st Stage 7 La Tropicale Amissa Bongo
8th Grand Prix of Aargau Canton
2020
1st Stage 1 Vuelta al Táchira
6th Giro della Toscana
2021
6th Clàssica Comunitat Valenciana 1969
