= Adam de Vos =

Canadian road cyclist

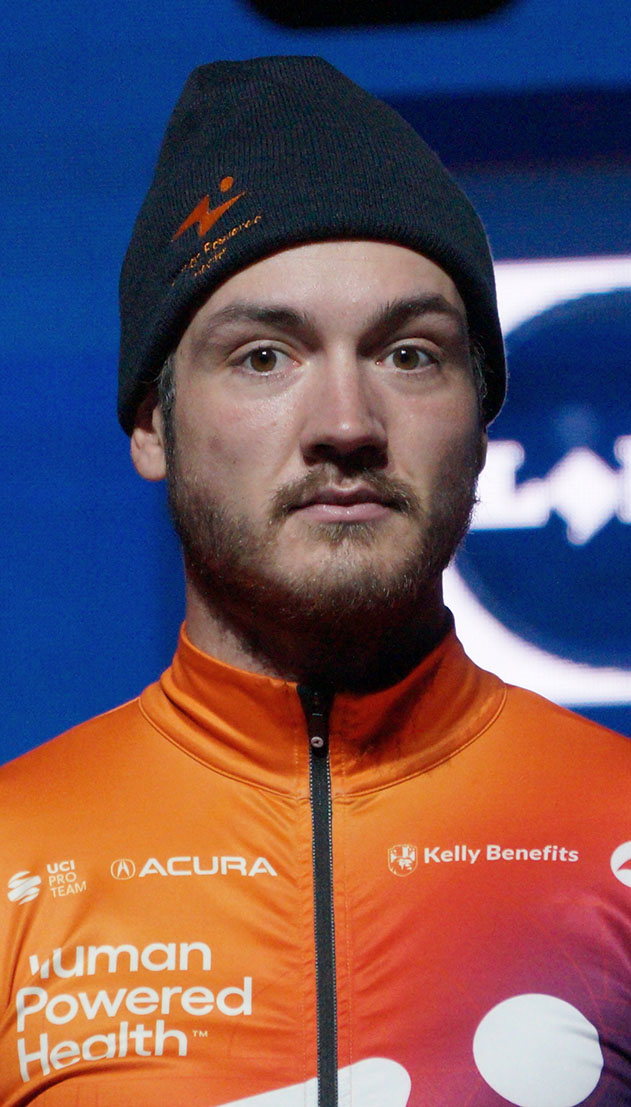
- De Vos in 2023

Personal information
- Full name: Adam de Vos
- Born: 21 October 1993 (age 32) Victoria, British Columbia
- Height: 1.87 m (6 ft 2 in)

Cycling career
- Sport: Cycling
- Current team: Retired
- Discipline: Road
- Role: Rider

Amateur teams
- 2012–2013: Trek Red Truck–Mosaic Homes
- 2014: H&R Block

Professional teams
- 2015: H&R Block Pro Cycling
- 2016–2023: Rally Cycling

Major wins
- One-day races and Classics National Road Race Championships (2019)

Adam de Vos (born 21 October 1993) is a Canadian cyclist, who competed as a professional from 2015 to 2023.

== Major results ==
2013
7th Road race, Jeux de la Francophonie
2015
Pan American Road Championships

5th Road race
7th Under-23 time trial

7th Overall Tour of the Gila
9th Road race, UCI Under-23 Road World Championships
2017
1st Raiffeisen Grand Prix
2nd Overall Joe Martin Stage Race

1st Stage 1 (ITT)

7th Overall Tour of the Gila
2018
1st White Spot / Delta Road Race
1st Stage 3 Tour de Langkawi
2019
1st Road race, National Road Championships
4th Classic Loire Atlantique
9th Slag om Norg
2020
10th Overall Vuelta a Murcia
2023
3rd Ronde van Drenthe
