= Abram Stockman =

Belgian professional road cyclist

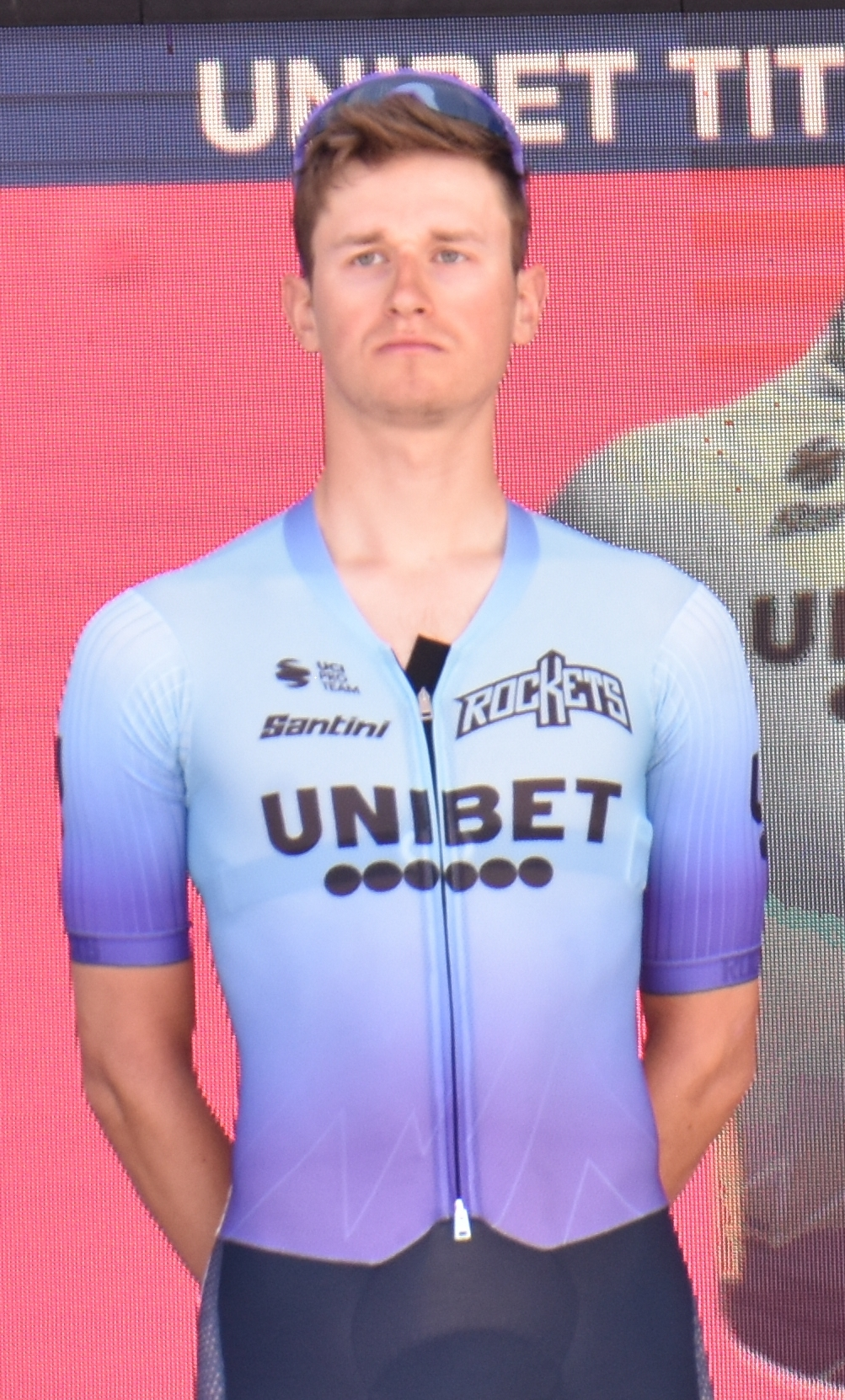
- Stockman in 2025

Personal information
- Full name: Abram Stockman
- Born: 31 July 1996 (age 30) Waregem, Belgium
- Height: 1.82 m (6 ft 0 in)
- Weight: 67 kg (148 lb)

Cycling career
- Sport: Cycling
- Current team: Unibet Rose Rockets
- Discipline: Road
- Role: Rider
- Rider type: All-rounder

Amateur teams
- 2015: KSV Deerlijk Gaverzicht
- 2016: Tops Antiek CT–Atom6

Professional teams
- 2017–2019: Tarteletto–Isorex
- 2020–2022: Team SKS Sauerland NRW
- 2023–: TDT–Unibet Cycling Team

Abram Stockman (born 31 July 1996) is a Belgian road cyclist, who currently rides for UCI ProTeam Unibet Rose Rockets.

== Major results ==
2017
9th Grote Prijs Stad Sint-Niklaas
2018
10th Overall Tour of Azerbaijan (Iran)
2019
4th Overall Tour du Maroc

1st Mountains classification
1st Stage 2

8th Internationale Wielertrofee Jong Maar Moedig
2023
4th Grand Prix Cerami
7th Rutland–Melton CiCLE Classic
9th Volta Limburg Classic
9th Grand Prix Herning
2024
5th Ster van Zwolle
