= Luca Raggio =

Italian cyclist (born 1995)

Personal information
- Full name: Luca Raggio
- Born: 26 March 1995 (age 31) Chiavari, Italy

Cycling career
- Sport: Cycling
- Current team: Retired
- Discipline: Road
- Role: Rider
- Rider type: Climber

Amateur teams
- 2014–2015: Overall
- 2016–2017: Viris Maserati Sisal Matchpoint

Professional teams
- 2017: Wilier Triestina–Selle Italia (stagiaire)
- 2018–2019: Wilier Triestina–Selle Italia
- 2020: D'Amico–UM Tools

Luca Raggio (born 26 March 1995) is an Italian former professional cyclist, who rode professionally from 2018 to 2020 for the Neri Sottoli–Selle Italia–KTM and D'Amico–UM Tools teams.

== Major results ==
2017
3rd Ruota d'Oro
4th Coppa della Pace
5th Gran Premio Industrie del Marmo
5th GP Capodarco
8th Trofeo Edil C
10th Overall Giro Ciclistico d'Italia
