= Yecid Sierra =

Colombian cyclist

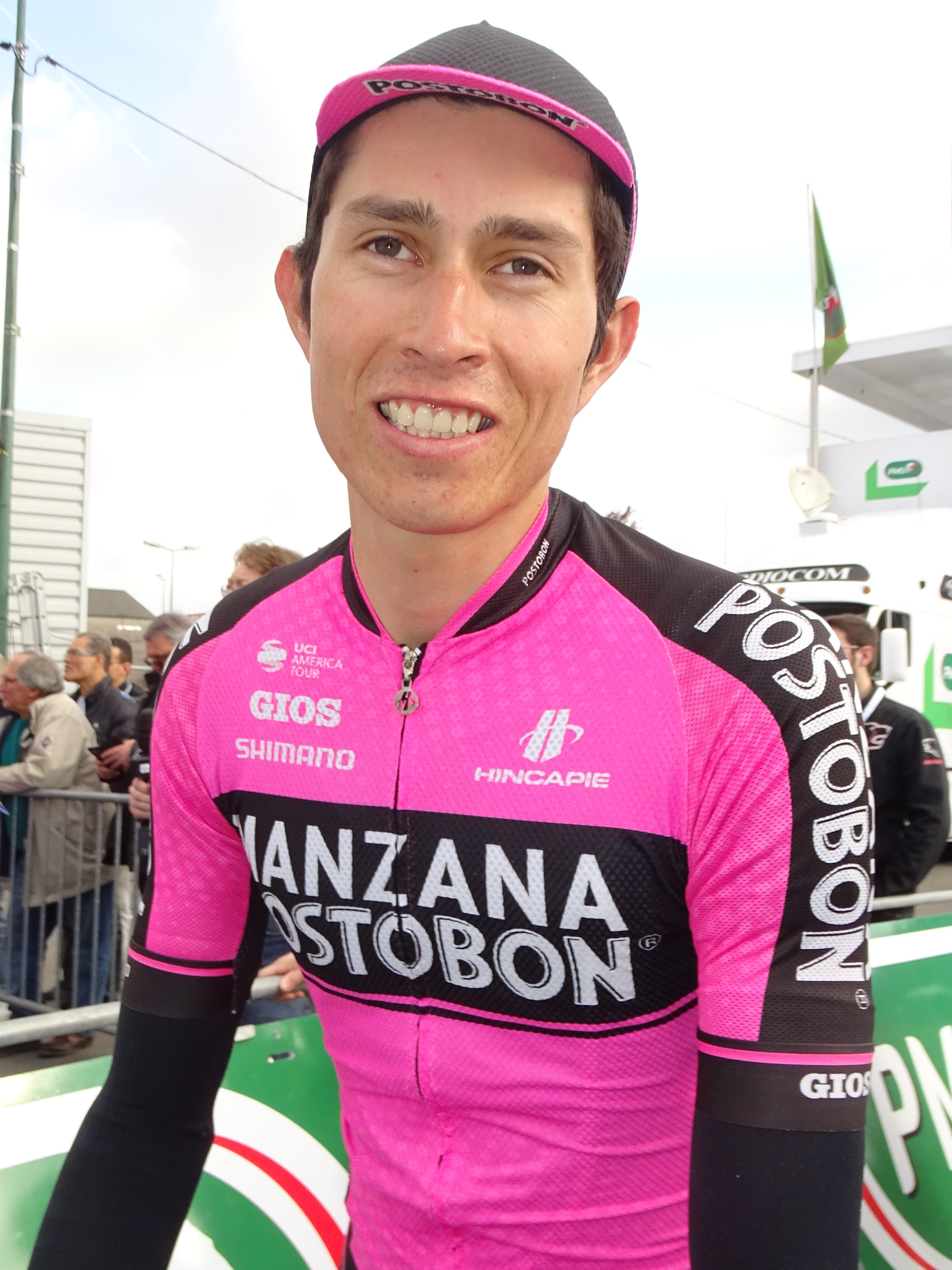
- Sierra in 2017

Personal information
- Full name: Yecid Arturo Sierra Sánchez
- Born: 16 August 1994 (age 32) La Vega, Cundinamarca, Colombia
- Height: 1.84 m (6 ft 0 in)
- Weight: 66 kg (146 lb)

Cycling career
- Sport: Cycling
- Current team: Astemo Utsunomiya Blitzen
- Discipline: Road
- Role: Rider

Amateur teams
- 2015: Team Manzana Postobón
- 2020: Aguardiente Néctar–IMRD–Chía–Cundinamarca
- 2022: Iowa Latino-Bicicletas Addict
- 2023: CNP Bocas del Cufré
- 2023: Liga Cundinamarca

Professional teams
- 2016–2019: Team Manzana Postobón
- 2019–2020: Tianyoude Hotel Cycling Team
- 2023: Tianyoude Hotel Cycling Team
- 2024–: Utsunomiya Blitzen

Yecid Arturo Sierra Sánchez (born 16 August 1994) is a Colombian cyclist, who currently rides for UCI Continental team Astemo Utsunomiya Blitzen.

== Major results ==
2012
2nd Road race, National Junior Road Championships
2018
5th Overall Tour of Qinghai Lake
2019
5th Overall Tour of Qinghai Lake
6th Overall Tour de Ijen
10th Overall Tour of Iran (Azerbaijan)
2022
1st Stage 3 Tour Ciclístico de Panamá
