= Mes Kerman (cycling team) =

Iranian cycling team

Team information
- UCI code: MES
- Registered: Iran
- Founded: 2007 (initial formation); 2018 (refounded)
- Discipline: Road
- Status: UCI Continental

Team name history
- 2007 2010–2011 2012 2018–: Mes Kerman; Vali Asr Kerman; Mes Kerman; Mes Kerman

Mes Kerman is an Iranian UCI Continental cycling team established in 2007. The team disbanded after the 2012 season, and re-formed in 2018.

== Team roster ==
As of 15 April 2020.

Rider	Date of birth
Hossein Bahraminejad (IRN)	14 December 2000 (age 25)
Mohammad Charkhandaz (IRN)	11 September 2001 (age 24)
Amin Chehrzad (IRN)	25 October 1983 (age 42)
Saeid Chehrzad (IRN)	23 August 1978 (age 48)
Jalil Eslami (IRN)	18 September 1978 (age 47)

Rider	Date of birth
Sina Karimian (IRN)	2 July 2001 (age 25)
Amirhossein Rahiminia (IRN)	22 August 1996 (age 30)
Alireza Ramezanimozafarabadi (IRN)	28 May 2001 (age 25)
Mohammadhossein Tizhoshbarpanah (IRN)	2 December 1997 (age 28)
Mohammad Zangi Abadi (IRN)	14 June 1990 (age 36)
