= Mohammad Saufi Mat Senan =

Malaysian cyclist

Personal information
- Full name: Mohammad Saufi Mat Senan
- Born: 10 October 1990 (age 36) Malaysia

Cycling career
- Sport: Cycling
- Discipline: Road
- Role: Rider

Amateur teams
- 2016: Persada DCC
- 2017: Sitra Kelantan

Professional teams
- 2011–2015: Terengganu Cycling Team
- 2018: Forca Amskins Racing

Mohammad Saufi Mat Senan (born 10 October 1990) is a Malaysian professional cyclist, who last rode for UCI Continental team Forca Amskins Racing.

== Major results ==
2009
3rd Overall Tengku Mahkota Pahang Trophy
2012
1st Stage 5 Tour of Thailand
1st Stage 2 Tour of Hainan
2013
6th Overall Tour de Taiwan
10th Road race, Southeast Asian Games
