= Dmitri Sokolov (cyclist) =

Russian cyclist

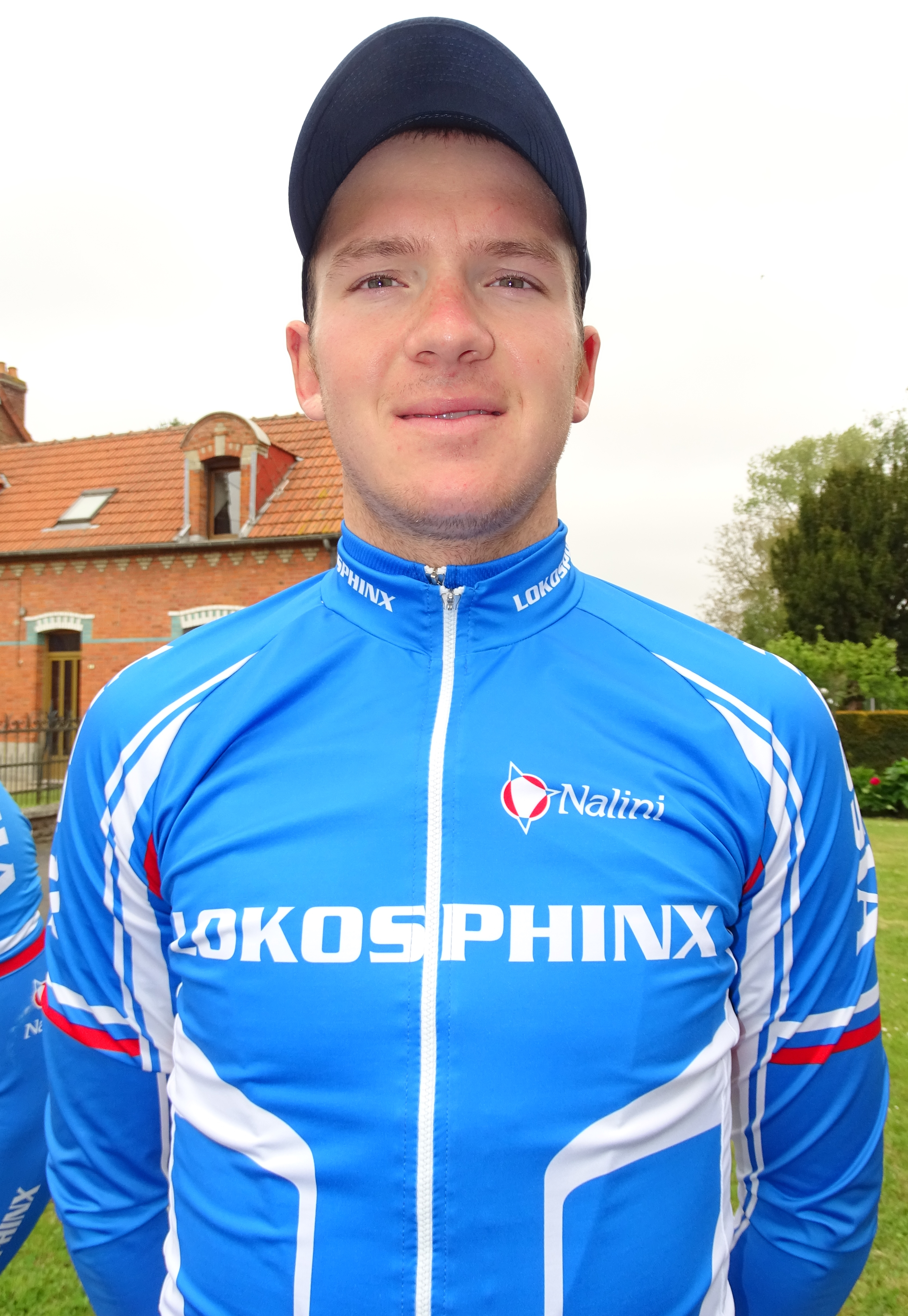
- Sokolov in 2015

Personal information
- Full name: Dmitri Sokolov; Russian: Дмитрий Соколов
- Born: 19 March 1988 (age 38) Izhevsk, Soviet Union

Cycling career
- Sport: Cycling
- Current team: Lokosphinx
- Disciplines: Road; Track
- Role: Rider

Professional teams
- 2010: Katyusha Continental Team
- 2012–: Lokosphinx
Medal record
European Championships
Bronze medal – third place	2017 Berlin	Team pursuit

Dmitri Sokolov (Russian: Дмитрий Соколов; born 19 March 1988) is a Russian professional racing cyclist, who currently rides for UCI Continental team Lokosphinx. He rode in the men's team pursuit at the 2016 UCI Track Cycling World Championships.

== Major results ==
2005
1st Time trial, UEC European Junior Road Championships
8th Time trial, UCI Juniors World Championships
2006
1st Time trial, UEC European Junior Road Championships
1st Stage 2 Giro di Basilicata
2nd Overall Trofeo Karlsberg

1st Stage 1

UCI Juniors World Championships

4th Road race
4th Time trial

2007
7th Time trial, UEC European Under-23 Road Championships
2008
3rd GP Capodarco
4th Time trial, UEC European Under-23 Road Championships
2012
2nd Team pursuit, 2012–13 UCI Track Cycling World Cup, Cali
2nd Time trial, National Road Championships
7th Memorial Davide Fardelli
2015
2015–16 UCI Track Cycling World Cup, Cali

1st Team pursuit
3rd Individual pursuit

10th Overall Vuelta a la Comunidad de Madrid
2016
10th Klasika Primavera
2017
2nd Team pursuit, 2016–17 UCI Track Cycling World Cup, Cali
3rd Team pursuit, 2017–18 UCI Track Cycling World Cup, Pruszków
3rd Team pursuit, UEC European Track Championships
2018
1st Overall Tour of Iran (Azerbaijan)

1st Stage 2

2nd Team pursuit, 2017–18 UCI Track Cycling World Cup, Minsk
2nd Overall Giro della Regione Friuli Venezia Giulia
2020
10th Grand Prix Mount Erciyes
