= Cyclus Sports =

Team information
- UCI code: CSS
- Registered: United States
- Founded: 2018
- Discipline: Road
- Status: UCI Continental

Team name history
- 2018–: Cyclus Sports

Cyclus Sports is an American UCI Continental cycling team founded in 2018.

== Team roster ==
| Rider | Date of birth |
|---|---|
| Ian Baun (USA) | 23 July 2000 (age 26) |
| Winston David (USA) | 3 November 1997 (age 28) |
| Corey Davis (USA) | 23 December 1997 (age 28) |
| Franklin Deese (USA) | 18 February 1998 (age 28) |
| Oliver Flautt (USA) | 17 June 1997 (age 29) |

| Rider | Date of birth |
|---|---|
| Michael Gearren (USA) | 22 December 1997 (age 28) |
| Andrew Giniat (USA) | 14 March 1999 (age 27) |
| Parker Kyzer (USA) | 14 March 1999 (age 27) |
| Ricky Randall (USA) | 3 March 1999 (age 27) |
| Ben Renkema (USA) | 18 October 1997 (age 28) |
| Sallee Connor (USA) | 14 March 1999 (age 27) |
