= KFC Cycling Team =

Indonesian cycling team

Team information
- UCI code: KFC
- Registered: Indonesia
- Founded: 2016
- Discipline: Road
- Status: National (2016); UCI Continental (2017–)

Key personnel
- Team managers: Mohammad Aliza Gibran; Ateng Tedjasukmana

Team name history
- 2016–: KFC Cycling Team

KFC Cycling Team is an Indonesian UCI Continental cycling team established in 2016, gaining UCI Continental status in 2017.

== Team roster ==
As of 15 February 2021.

Rider	Date of birth
Muhammad Abdurrohman (INA)	16 May 1997 (age 29)
Mahrus Ali (INA)	25 April 1999 (age 27)
Muhammad Arifin (INA)	16 December 1995 (age 30)
Mohammad Fikri Azka (INA)	6 November 1996 (age 29)
Prasetyo Firdaus (INA)	28 March 2001 (age 25)
Abdul Gani (INA)	8 August 1992 (age 34)

Rider	Date of birth
Selamat Juangga (INA)	11 February 1992 (age 34)
Muhmmad Ridwan (INA)	11 October 2000 (age 25)
Agung Sahbana (INA)	31 March 1988 (age 38)
Odie Setiawan (INA)	29 November 1996 (age 29)
Abdul Soleh (INA)	13 July 1992 (age 34)

== Major wins ==
2017
Stage 2 Tour de Flores, Muhammah Imam Arifin
Stage 4 Tour de Singkarak, Jamal Hibatulah
Stages 6 & 7 Tour de Singkarak, Muhammah Imam Arifin
2018
Stage 2 Tour de Indonesia, Abdul Gani
2019
Stage 4 Tour de Siak, Muhamad Nur Fathoni
