= Riccardo Minali =

Italian bicycle racer

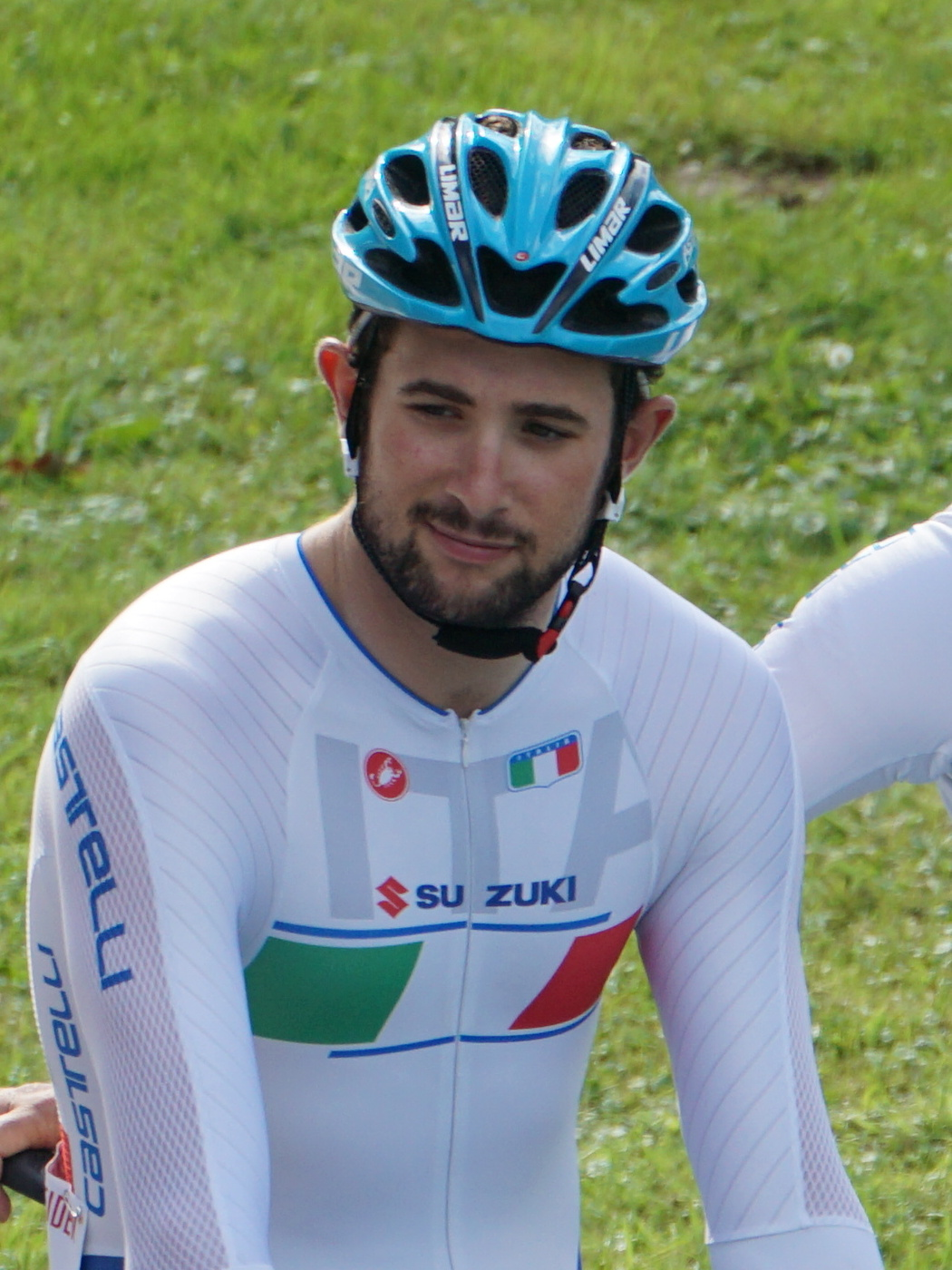
- Minali in 2017

Personal information
- Born: 19 April 1995 (age 31) Isola della Scala, Italy
- Height: 180 cm (71 in)
- Weight: 74 kg (163 lb)

Cycling career
- Sport: Cycling
- Discipline: Road
- Role: Rider
- Rider type: Sprinter

Amateur teams
- 2011: VC Isolano–Stella81–Sartori
- 2014: General Store Bottoli Zardini
- 2015–2016: Team Colpack

Professional teams
- 2017–2018: Astana
- 2019: Israel Cycling Academy
- 2020: Nippo–Delko–One Provence
- 2021: Intermarché–Wanty–Gobert Matériaux

Riccardo Minali (born 19 April 1995) is an Italian former cyclist, who competed, as a professional from 2017 to 2021. He is the son of Nicola Minali, who was also a professional cyclist.

== Major results ==
2013
2nd Omnium, UEC European Junior Track Championships
2015
1st Circuito del Porto
4th Memorial Denis Zanette e Daniele Del Ben
2016
2nd Circuito del Porto
3rd Coppa dei Laghi-Trofeo Almar
2017
7th Overall Dubai Tour
7th Brussels Cycling Classic
2018
Tour de Langkawi

1st Stages 2 & 4

5th Gran Piemonte
5th Gran Premio Bruno Beghelli
9th Grand Prix de Fourmies
2019
4th Gooikse Pijl
2021
5th Grote Prijs Jean-Pierre Monseré
7th Gran Piemonte
9th Grand Prix d'Isbergues

=== Grand Tour general classification results timeline ===
Grand Tour	2021
Giro d'Italia	143
Tour de France	—
Vuelta a España	138

Legend
—	Did not compete
DNF	Did not finish
