= Álvaro Duarte =

Colombian cyclist

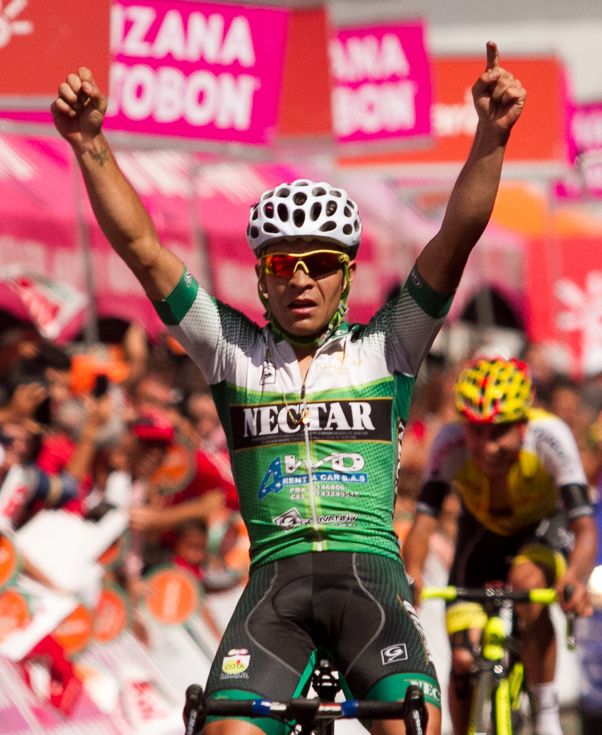
- Duarte in 2015

Personal information
- Full name: Álvaro Raul Duarte Sandoval
- Born: 12 January 1991 (age 35) Funza, Colombia

Cycling career
- Sport: Cycling
- Discipline: Road
- Role: Rider

Amateur teams
- 2011: EBSA–Empresa de Energía de Boyacá
- 2013: Aguardiente Néctar
- 2014: Construcciones Paulino
- 2015: Aguardiente Néctar

Professional teams
- 2012: Coldeportes–Comcel
- 2015: RTS–Santic Racing Team
- 2016–2017: Movistar Team América
- 2018: Forca Amskins Racing
- 2019: China Continental Team of Gansu Bank

Álvaro Raul Duarte Sandoval (born 12 January 1991) is a Colombian road cyclist. He won the overall classification of the 2018 Tour de Lombok and the mountains classification of the 2015 Vuelta a Colombia. He is the younger brother of professional cyclist Fabio Duarte.

== Major results ==
2011
1st Stage 2 Vuelta a Cundinamarca
5th Overall Vuelta a Bolivia

1st Stage 9b

2015
1st Mountains classification Vuelta a Colombia
1st Stage 9 Clásico RCN
6th Overall Vuelta a Guatemala

1st Stages 5 & 6

2016
1st Stage 2 Vuelta a Cundinamarca
2017
1st Stage 3 Clásica de Fusagasugá
2018
1st Overall Tour de Lombok
9th Overall Tour de Langkawi

1st Mountains classification
