= DFT Team =

Fengsheng Sports DFT Team
Team information
- UCI code: DFT
- Registered: Iran
- Founded: 2018
- Discipline: Road
- Status: UCI Continental

Team name history
- 2018 2019–: DFT Team; Fengsheng Sports DFT Team

Fengsheng Sports DFT Team is an Iranian UCI Continental cycling team established in 2018.

== Team roster ==
Rider	Date of birth
Siyavash Abbaszadehlamtar (IRI)	29 July 1989 (age 37)
Mehdi Bahari (IRI)	26 August 1980 (age 46)
Morteza Jafarzadeh (IRI)	30 December 1997 (age 28)
Parviz Mardani (IRI)	14 August 1982 (age 44)
Morteza Mohammadi (IRI)	3 April 1994 (age 32)
Bahram Najafi (IRI)	9 June 1997 (age 29)

Rider	Date of birth
Ali Nemati Khiavi (IRI)	23 December 1985 (age 40)
Sina Nemati Khiavi (IRI)	16 December 1998 (age 27)
Meisam Nournezhadvanoush (IRI)	6 April 1992 (age 34)
Sajjad Paydar Shirvanehdeh (IRI)	29 October 1989 (age 36)
Amin Pournajaf (IRI)	9 October 1983 (age 42)
Semere Zeray (ERI)	8 May 1998 (age 28)
