= Jacob Hennessy =

British bicycle racer

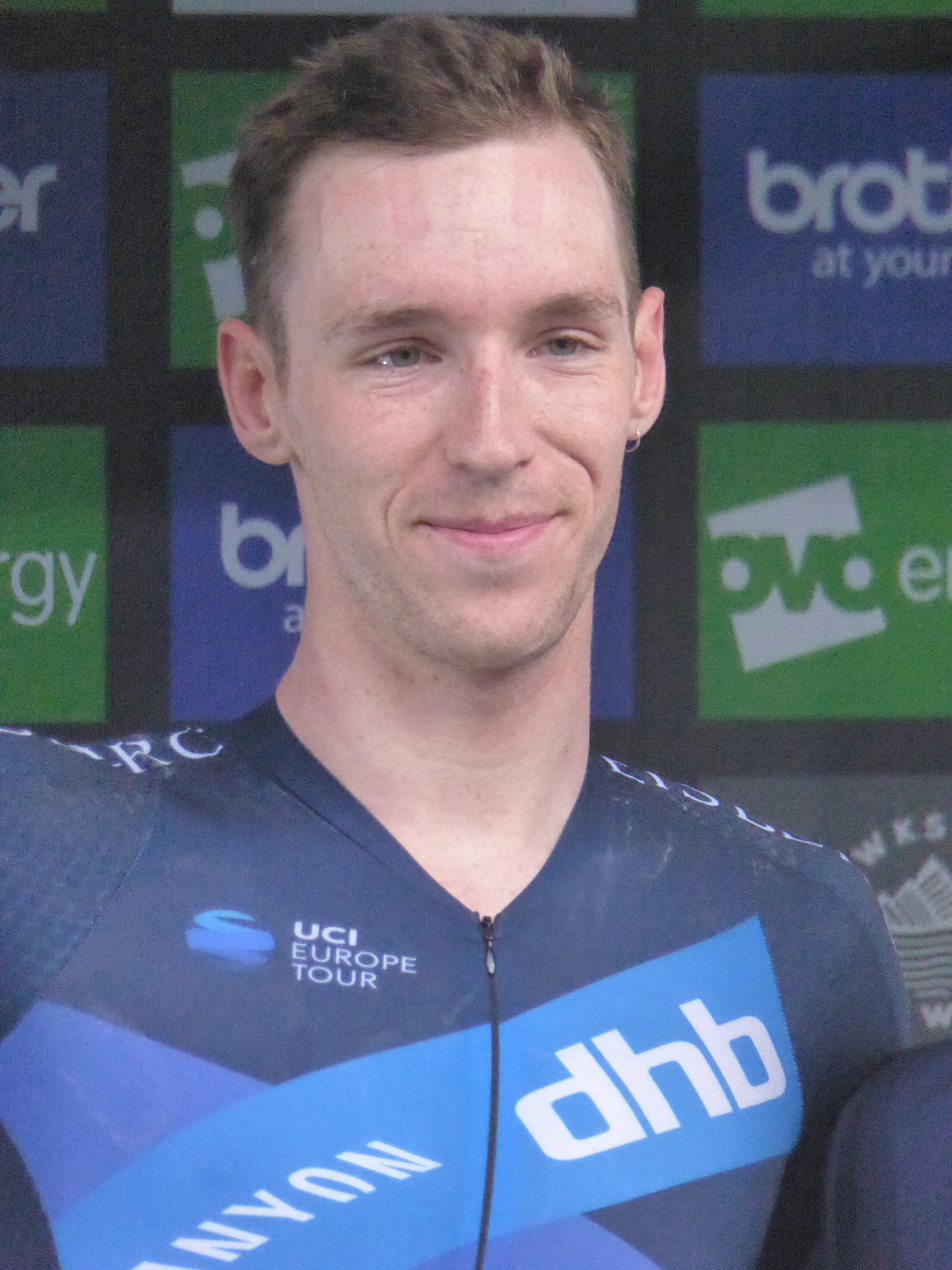
- Hennessy in 2019

Personal information
- Full name: Jacob Michael Hennessy
- Born: 10 August 1996 (age 30) St Neots, England
- Height: 1.93 m (6 ft 4 in)
- Weight: 79 kg (174 lb)

Cycling career
- Sport: Cycling
- Current team: Retired
- Discipline: Road
- Role: Rider

Amateur teams
- 2016: Spirit Bikes Racing
- 2016: JLT–Condor (stagiaire)
- 2017: 100% Me

Professional teams
- 2018: Mitchelton–BikeExchange
- 2019–2021: Canyon dhb p/b Bloor Homes
- 2021–2022: Saint Piran
- 2023: Li-Ning Star

Jacob Michael Hennessy (born 10 August 1996) is a British former cyclist, who competed between 2018 and 2023 for UCI Continental teams Mitchelton–BikeExchange, Canyon dhb SunGod, Saint Piran and Li-Ning Star. Hennessy specialises in classic style races and sprint finishes.

== Major results ==
2016
1st Skipton, National Circuit Series
1st Jock Wadley Memorial Road Race
2017
1st Gent–Wevelgem U23
1st GP Mémorial Pierre Dewailly
5th Overall Paris–Arras Tour

1st Stage 1

2019
1st Round 2 – Motherwell, Tour Series
2nd Omloop van het Waasland
7th Arno Wallaard Memorial
