= Giuseppe Fonzi =

Italian cyclist

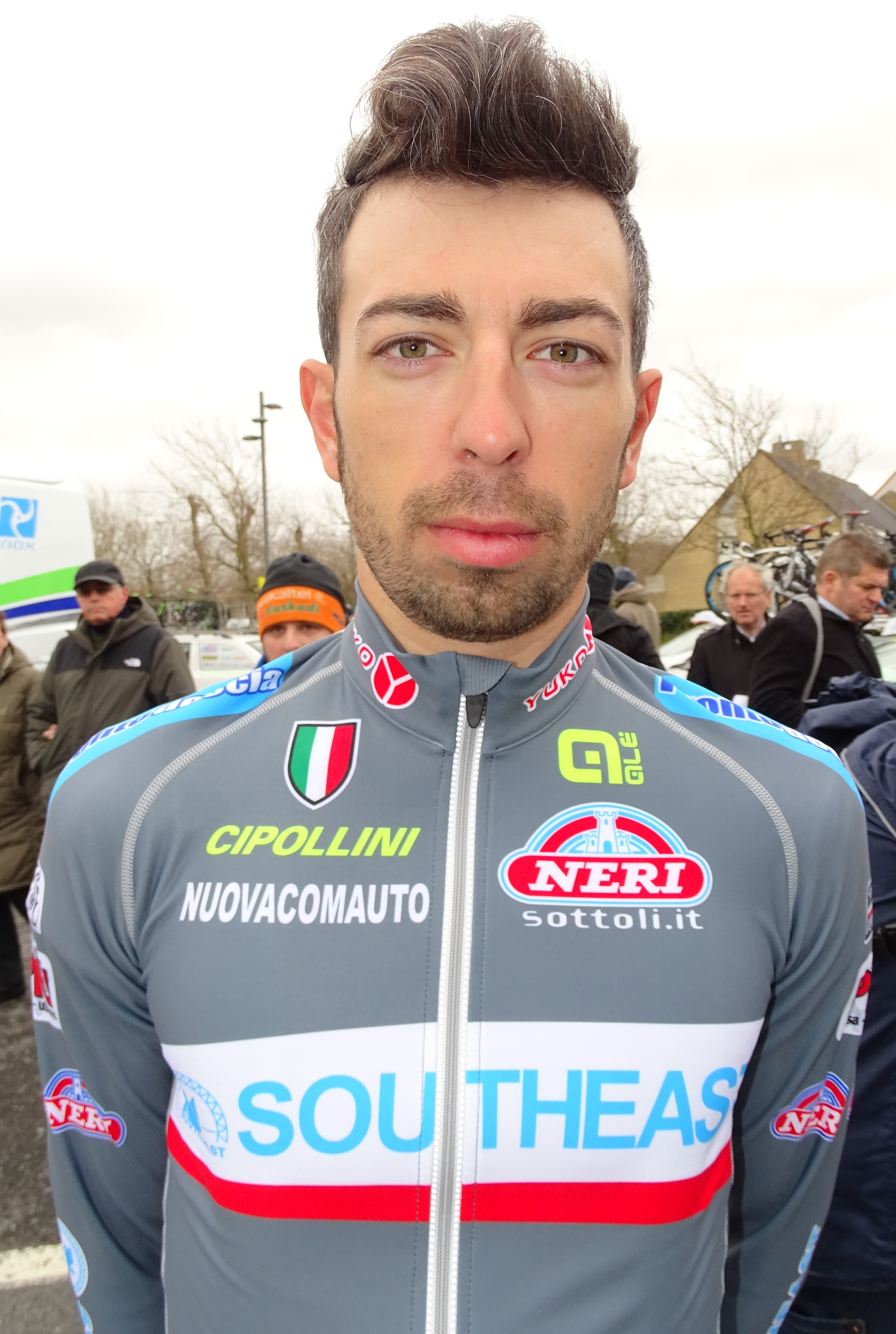
- Fonzi in 2015

Personal information
- Full name: Giuseppe Fonzi
- Born: 2 August 1991 (age 35) Pescara, Italy
- Height: 1.80 m (5 ft 11 in)
- Weight: 63 kg (139 lb)

Cycling career
- Sport: Cycling
- Current team: Retired
- Discipline: Road
- Role: Rider

Amateur teams
- 2008–2009: ASD Pol Bevilacqua Sport
- 2010–2012: De Nardi–Colpack–Bergamasca
- 2013: Vini Fantini–D'Angelo & Antenucci–Kyklos

Professional teams
- 2014: Vini Fantini–Nippo
- 2014–2019: Neri Sottoli

Giuseppe Fonzi (born 2 August 1991) is an Italian former professional racing cyclist, who rode professionally between 2014 and 2019 for the Vini Fantini–Nippo and Neri Sottoli–Selle Italia–KTM teams. He was named in the start list for the 2017 Giro d'Italia, where he finished last of the 161 riders to complete the race.

== Career ==
Fonzi competed in his first ever monument race at the 2016 Tour of Flanders, but did not finish the race; he had been riding as a domestique for teammate Filippo Pozzato. He finished 4th overall in the Tour of Taihu Lake. In 2017, Fonzi rode the Tour of Flanders again. At the Giro d'Italia, Fonzi finished 161st overall, last of the riders to complete the race. His best result of the season was 12th overall at the Tour de Korea.

At the 2018 Tour de Langkawi, Fonzi finished 5th overall, after finishing 10th in the breakaway that stayed away on stage 7. He started the Giro d'Italia for a second time in his career, and finished the race in last place once again.

== Major results ==
2009
1st Piccola Tre Valli Varesine

2016
4th Overall Tour of Taihu Lake

2018
5th Overall Tour de Langkawi

=== Grand Tour general classification results timeline ===
Grand Tour	2017	2018
Giro d'Italia	161	149
Tour de France	—	—
Vuelta a España	—	—

=== Monuments results timeline ===
Monument	2016	2017
Milan–San Remo	—	—
Tour of Flanders	DNF	DNF
Paris–Roubaix	—	—
Liège–Bastogne–Liège	—	—
Giro di Lombardia	—	—

Legend
—	Did not compete
DNF	Did not finish
