= Gun Ay Tabriz Team =

Team information
- UCI code: GTT
- Registered: Iran
- Founded: 2018
- Discipline: Road
- Status: UCI Continental

Gun Ay Tabriz Team is an Iranian UCI Continental cycling team established in 2018.

== Team roster ==
| Rider | Date of birth |
|---|---|
| Majid Asgharibehrouz (IRI) | 31 March 1996 (age 30) |
| Esmaeil Bagheri (IRI) | 22 October 1994 (age 31) |
| Mokhtari Farhad (IRI) | 6 September 1988 (age 38) |
| Akbar Najafzadeh (IRI) | 1 April 1987 (age 39) |
| Hossein Najmi Bonab (IRI) | 14 August 1990 (age 36) |

| Rider | Date of birth |
|---|---|
| Sajjad Paydar Shirvanehdeh (IRI) | 29 October 1989 (age 36) |
| Karim Pourgholibelvirdi (IRI) | 22 June 1985 (age 41) |
| Tohid Sahraei Bonab (IRI) | 4 January 1990 (age 36) |
| Miraref Sajedi (IRI) | 25 May 1990 (age 36) |
| Mirarash Sajedi (IRI) | 9 January 1984 (age 42) |
