= Staki–Technorama =

Team information
- UCI code: SIT
- Registered: Vilnius, Lithuania
- Founded: 2016
- Discipline: Road
- Status: UCI Continental

Team name history
- 2016 2017–: Staki–Baltik Vairas; Staki–Technorama

Staki–Technorama (UCI team code: SIT) is a men's UCI Continental cycling team, based in Lithuania. It is named as first professional cycling club in Lithuania.

== Team roster ==
Rider	Date of birth
Matas Antanavicius (LTU)	24 September 1999 (age 26)
Artur Ceremisinov (LTU)	2 October 1999 (age 26)
Tomas Gembeckas (LTU)	28 May 1996 (age 30)
Matas Jankauskas (LTU)	30 July 1998 (age 28)
Venantas Lašinis (LTU)	26 February 1997 (age 29)
Arnas Pelaitis (LTU)	30 November 1994 (age 31)

Rider	Date of birth
Mykolas Račiūnas (LTU)	4 May 1995 (age 31)
Domantas Rimkus (LTU)	5 November 1999 (age 26)
Paulius Šiškevičius (LTU)	7 September 1993 (age 32)
Paulius Valiukas (LTU)	3 April 1999 (age 27)
