= Forca Amskins Racing =

Team information
- UCI code: FAR
- Registered: Malaysia
- Founded: January 2018
- Disbanded: 2020
- Discipline: Road
- Status: UCI Continental

Team name history
- 2018–2019: Forca Amskins Racing

Forca Amskins Racing is a former Malaysian UCI Continental cycling team founded in 2018. It was founded by Malaysian national cyclist Anuar Manan, as a platform mainly to ride the 2018 Tour de Langkawi after his release from Terengganu Cycling Team.

Unfortunately the team faced financial difficulties and failed to register for the 2019 Tour de Langkawi. The team also failed to be registered for the 2020 UCI road race calendar, and were dissolved soon after.

== Team roster 2018 ==
Rider	Date of birth
Mohd Hafidz Abd Hamid (MYS)	19 April 1993 (age 33)
Alvaro Duarte (COL)	12 January 1991 (age 35)
John Ebsen (DEN)	15 November 1988 (age 37)
Wan Abdul Rahman Hamdan (MYS)	19 June 1999 (age 27)

Rider	Date of birth
Anuar Manan (MYS)	11 October 1986 (age 39)
Mohammad Saufi Mat Senan (MYS)	10 October 1990 (age 35)
Sofian Nabil Mohd Bakri (MYS)	19 April 1993 (age 33)
Amir Mustafa Rusli (MYS)	5 February 1987 (age 39)
Nik Mohamad Azman Zulkifli (MYS)	7 May 1990 (age 36)
