= 2015 Tour d'Azerbaïdjan =

2015 UCI Europe Tour

Race details
- Dates: 6–10 May 2015
- Stages: 5
- Distance: 865.6 km (537.9 mi)
- Winning time: 20h 14' 42"

Results
Jersey awarded to the overall winner	Winner	Primož Roglič (SLO)	(Adria Mobil)
	Second	Jasper Ockeloen (NED)	(Parkhotel Valkenburg Continental Team)
	Third	Matej Mugerli (SLO)	(Synergy Baku)
Jersey awarded to the points classification winner	Points	Marko Kump (SLO)	(Adria Mobil)
Jersey awarded to the mountains classification winner	Mountains	Oleksandr Surutkovych (UKR)	(Synergy Baku)
Jersey awarded to the youth classification winner	Youth	František Sisr (CZE)	(Team Dukla Praha)
	Team	Synergy Baku	

The 2015 Tour d'Azerbaïdjan was a five-day cycling stage race that took place in Azerbaijan in May 2015, as the fourth edition of the Tour d'Azerbaïdjan. It was rated as a 2.1 event as part of the 2015 UCI Europe Tour. The race included five stages, starting in Baku on 6 May and returning there for the finish on 10 May. The 2014 champion was Ilnur Zakarin (then RusVelo), but he was not present to defend his title.

The race was won by Primož Roglič (Adria Mobil), who won a solo victory on the second stage of the race and went on to defend his lead to the finish. He finished the race 34 seconds ahead of Jasper Ockeloen (Parkhotel Valkenburg Continental Team), with Matej Mugerli (Synergy Baku) third. Roglič's teammate Marko Kump won a stage and the points classification, while Synergy Baku won both the team classification and the mountains classification through Oleksandr Surutkovych. The youth classification was won by František Sisr (Team Dukla Praha).

== Schedule ==
The race included five road stages on consecutive days.

Stage	Date	Course	Distance	Type	Winner
1	6 May	Baku to Sumgait	153.5 km (95.4 mi)	Flat stage	Marko Kump (SLO)
2	7 May	Baku to Ismayilli	186.5 km (115.9 mi)	Medium-mountain stage	Primož Roglič (SLO)
3	8 May	Qabala to Qabala	177.2 km (110.1 mi)	Mountain stage	Josh Edmondson (GBR)
4	9 May	Qabala to Mingachevir	204.6 km (127.1 mi)	Flat stage	Daniel Turek (CZE)
5	10 May	Baku to Baku	143.8 km (89.4 mi)	Medium-mountain stage	Sergey Firsanov (RUS)
Total		865.6 km (537.9 mi)			

== Teams ==
25 teams were invited to take part in the race. Four of these were UCI Professional Continental teams, 17 were UCI Continental teams and four were national teams. Each team could enter a maximum of six riders; the total size of the peloton at the beginning of the first stage was 148 riders.

UCI Professional Continental teams

- RusVelo
- Drapac Professional Cycling
- Team Novo Nordisk
- Androni Giocattoli–Sidermec

UCI Continental teams

- Synergy Baku
- Airgas–Safeway
- Adria Mobil
- An Post–Chain Reaction
- Leopard Development Team
- Giant–Champion System
- Tuşnad Cycling Team
- MLP Team Bergstraße
- CK Banská Bystrica
- Torku Şekerspor
- Team Dukla Praha
- Parkhotel Valkenburg Continental Team
- CCN
- Tavira
- Minsk
- Hrinkow Advarics Cycleangteam
- Cycling Academy

National teams

- Hungary
- Estonia
- Kazakhstan
- Greece

== Stages ==
=== Stage 1 ===
6 May 2015 – Baku to Sumgait, 153.5 km (95.4 mi)

Stage 1 result and General classification after stage 1
Rank	Rider	Team	Time
1	Marko Kump (SLO)	Adria Mobil	3h 36' 59"
2	Francesco Chicchi (ITA)	Androni Giocattoli–Sidermec	+ 0"
3	Maksym Averin (AZE)	Synergy Baku	+ 0"
4	Marco Zanotti (ITA)	Parkhotel Valkenburg Continental Team	+ 0"
5	Jiří Hochmann (CZE)	Team Dukla Praha	+ 0"
6	Uladzimir Harakhavik (BLR)	Minsk	+ 0"
7	Charalampos Kastrantas (GRE)	Greece (national team)	+ 0"
8	Manuel Cardoso (POR)	Tavira	+ 0"
9	Martin Laas (EST)	Estonia (national team)	+ 0"
10	Artur Ershov (RUS)	RusVelo	+ 0"

=== Stage 2 ===
7 May 2015 – Baku to Ismayilli, 186.5 km (115.9 mi)

Stage 2 result
Rank	Rider	Team	Time
1	Primož Roglič (SLO)	Adria Mobil	4h 43' 26"
2	Matej Mugerli (SLO)	Synergy Baku	+ 34"
3	Chris Horner (USA)	Airgas–Safeway	+ 34"
4	Jasper Ockeloen (NED)	Parkhotel Valkenburg Continental Team	+ 34"
5	Maksym Averin (AZE)	Synergy Baku	+ 3' 50"
6	Alexandr Shushemoin (KAZ)	Kazakhstan (national team)	+ 3' 50"
7	František Sisr (CZE)	Team Dukla Praha	+ 3' 50"
8	Josh Edmondson (GBR)	An Post–Chain Reaction	+ 3' 50"
9	Kristjan Fajt (SLO)	Adria Mobil	+ 3' 50"
10	Sebastian Baldauf (GER)	Hrinkow Advarics Cycleangteam	+ 3' 50"

General classification after stage 2
Rank	Rider	Team	Time
1	Primož Roglič (SLO)	Adria Mobil	8h 20' 25"
2	Jasper Ockeloen (NED)	Parkhotel Valkenburg Continental Team	+ 34"
3	Matej Mugerli (SLO)	Synergy Baku	+ 34"
4	Chris Horner (USA)	Airgas–Safeway	+ 34"
5	Maksym Averin (AZE)	Synergy Baku	+ 3' 50"
6	Radoslav Rogina (CRO)	Adria Mobil	+ 3' 50"
7	František Sisr (CZE)	Team Dukla Praha	+ 3' 50"
8	Alexandr Shushemoin (KAZ)	Kazakhstan (national team)	+ 3' 50"
9	Sergey Firsanov (RUS)	RusVelo	+ 3' 50"
10	Kristjan Fajt (SLO)	Adria Mobil	+ 3' 50"

=== Stage 3 ===
8 May 2015 – Qabala to Qabala, 177.2 km (110.1 mi)

Stage 3 result
Rank	Rider	Team	Time
1	Josh Edmondson (GBR)	An Post–Chain Reaction	4h 07' 28"
2	Marko Kump (SLO)	Adria Mobil	+ 1"
3	Matej Mugerli (SLO)	Synergy Baku	+ 1"
4	Kristian Haugaard (DEN)	Leopard Development Team	+ 1"
5	Marco Zanotti (ITA)	Parkhotel Valkenburg Continental Team	+ 1"
6	František Sisr (CZE)	Team Dukla Praha	+ 1"
7	Emanuel Piaskowy (POL)	Cycling Academy	+ 1"
8	Xandro Meurisse (BEL)	An Post–Chain Reaction	+ 1"
9	Primož Roglič (SLO)	Adria Mobil	+ 1"
10	Clemens Fankhauser (AUT)	Hrinkow Advarics Cycleangteam	+ 1"

General classification after stage 3
Rank	Rider	Team	Time
1	Primož Roglič (SLO)	Adria Mobil	12h 27' 54"
2	Jasper Ockeloen (NED)	Parkhotel Valkenburg Continental Team	+ 34"
3	Matej Mugerli (SLO)	Synergy Baku	+ 34"
4	Chris Horner (USA)	Airgas–Safeway	+ 34"
5	Josh Edmondson (GBR)	An Post–Chain Reaction	+ 3' 49"
6	Maksym Averin (AZE)	Synergy Baku	+ 3' 50"
7	František Sisr (CZE)	Team Dukla Praha	+ 3' 50"
8	Sergey Firsanov (RUS)	RusVelo	+ 3' 50"
9	Radoslav Rogina (CRO)	Adria Mobil	+ 3' 56"
10	Alexandr Shushemoin (KAZ)	Kazakhstan (national team)	+ 3' 56"

=== Stage 4 ===
9 May 2015 – Qabala to Mingachevir, 204.6 km (127.1 mi)

Stage 4 result
Rank	Rider	Team	Time
1	Daniel Turek (CZE)	Cycling Academy	4h 13' 55"
2	Clemens Fankhauser (AUT)	Hrinkow Advarics Cycleangteam	+ 1"
3	Conor Dunne (IRL)	An Post–Chain Reaction	+ 1"
4	Griffin Easter (USA)	Airgas–Safeway	+ 3"
5	Brenton Jones (AUS)	Drapac Professional Cycling	+ 42"
6	Marko Kump (SLO)	Adria Mobil	+ 42"
7	Marco Benfatto (ITA)	Androni Giocattoli–Sidermec	+ 42"
8	Matvey Nikitin (KAZ)	Kazakhstan (national team)	+ 42"
9	Aidis Kruopis (LIT)	An Post–Chain Reaction	+ 42"
10	Marco Zanotti (ITA)	Parkhotel Valkenburg Continental Team	+ 42"

General classification after stage 4
Rank	Rider	Team	Time
1	Primož Roglič (SLO)	Adria Mobil	16h 42' 31"
2	Jasper Ockeloen (NED)	Parkhotel Valkenburg Continental Team	+ 34"
3	Matej Mugerli (SLO)	Synergy Baku	+ 34"
4	Chris Horner (USA)	Airgas–Safeway	+ 34"
5	Josh Edmondson (GBR)	An Post–Chain Reaction	+ 3' 49"
6	Maksym Averin (AZE)	Synergy Baku	+ 3' 50"
7	František Sisr (CZE)	Team Dukla Praha	+ 3' 50"
8	Sergey Firsanov (RUS)	RusVelo	+ 3' 50"
9	Clemens Fankhauser (AUT)	Hrinkow Advarics Cycleangteam	+ 3' 52"
10	Radoslav Rogina (CRO)	Adria Mobil	+ 3' 56"

=== Stage 5 ===
10 May 2015 – Baku to Baku, 143.8 km (89.4 mi)

Stage 5 result
Rank	Rider	Team	Time
1	Sergey Firsanov (RUS)	RusVelo	3h 32' 10"
2	Alexandr Shushemoin (KAZ)	Kazakhstan (national team)	+ 0"
3	Matej Mugerli (SLO)	Synergy Baku	+ 1"
4	František Sisr (CZE)	Team Dukla Praha	+ 1"
5	Chris Horner (USA)	Airgas–Safeway	+ 1"
6	Pavel Gatskiy (KAZ)	Kazakhstan (national team)	+ 1"
7	Marco Zanotti (ITA)	Parkhotel Valkenburg Continental Team	+ 1"
8	Ioannis Tamouridis (GRE)	Synergy Baku	+ 1"
9	Primož Roglič (SLO)	Adria Mobil	+ 1"
10	Bernard Sulzberger (AUS)	Drapac Professional Cycling	+ 1"

Final general classification
Rank	Rider	Team	Time
1	Primož Roglič (SLO)	Adria Mobil	20h 14' 42"
2	Jasper Ockeloen (NED)	Parkhotel Valkenburg Continental Team	+ 34"
3	Matej Mugerli (SLO)	Synergy Baku	+ 34"
4	Chris Horner (USA)	Airgas–Safeway	+ 34"
5	Sergey Firsanov (RUS)	RusVelo	+ 3' 49"
6	Josh Edmondson (GBR)	An Post–Chain Reaction	+ 3' 49"
7	Maksym Averin (AZE)	Synergy Baku	+ 3' 50"
8	František Sisr (CZE)	Team Dukla Praha	+ 3' 50"
9	Clemens Fankhauser (AUT)	Hrinkow Advarics Cycleangteam	+ 3' 52"
10	Alexandr Shushemoin (KAZ)	Kazakhstan (national team)	+ 3' 55"

== Classification leadership table ==
Stage	Winner	General classification	Mountains classification	Points classification	Young rider classification	Best Azeri classification	Teams classification
1	Marko Kump	Marko Kump	Elchin Asadov	Marko Kump	Uladzimir Harakhavik	Maksym Averin	Parkhotel Valkenburg Continental Team
2	Primož Roglič	Primož Roglič	Primož Roglič	Maksym Averin	František Sisr	Maksym Averin	Adria Mobil
3	Josh Edmondson	Primož Roglič	Oleksandr Surutkovych	Marko Kump	František Sisr	Maksym Averin	Adria Mobil
4	Daniel Turek	Primož Roglič	Oleksandr Surutkovych	Marko Kump	František Sisr	Maksym Averin	Adria Mobil
5	Sergey Firsanov	Primož Roglič	Oleksandr Surutkovych	Marko Kump	František Sisr	Maksym Averin	Synergy Baku
Final		Primož Roglič	Oleksandr Surutkovych	Marko Kump	František Sisr	Maksym Averin	Synergy Baku
