= 2027 in women's road cycling =

2027 in women's road cycling is about the 2027 women's bicycle races ruled by the UCI and the 2027 UCI Women's Teams.

== Single day races (1.1 and 1.2) ==
Race	Date	Cat. †	Winner	Second	Third	Ref
(Greece) Thessaloniki International Ladies Time Trial	31 October 2026	1.2	Zhang Hao; XDS China Women Team	(Slovenia) Pija Galof; PSKK Vassil-Levski	Eleftheria Giachou; Greece (national team)	
(Greece) Alexandria Ladies International Race	1 November 2026	1.2	Zhang Hao; XDS China Women Team	Argiro Milaki; Greece (national team)	Eleftheria Giachou; Greece (national team)	

== Gravel races ==
Race	Date	Cat. †	Winner	Second	Third	Ref
(Belgium) Leuven Legacy Gravel	18 October 2026	UGS	(Belgium) Nathalie Bex; Serso Gravelbike Team	(Netherlands) Maaike Coljé	(Germany) Jil Brünger	
(Australia) Gravelista	25 October 2026	UGS	(Australia) Ruby Taylor; Prolongo Al-Andalus Woman	(Denmark) Karoline Risager Schmidt; Cykle Klubben Aarhus	(Denmark) Amanda Poulsen; Team Redcat	
(Portugal) Alentejo Gravel	25 October 2026	UGS	(Germany) Rosa Klöser; Canyon//SRAM	(United States) Sarah Lange	(France) Émilie Morier; St. Michel–Preference Home–Auber93	

== Stage races (2.1 and 2.2) ==
Race	Date	Cat. †	Winner	Second	Third	Ref
29 October – 1 November 2026	Vuelta Ciclista del Uruguay Femenina	Prologue	(Argentina) Cala Bocchino; Trans Don Anibal - Damico	(Brazil) Tamires Radatz; Avaí F.C - FME Florianópolis - APGF	(Uruguay) Florencia Revetria; Armonía Cycles Club	
29 October – 1 November 2026	Vuelta Ciclista del Uruguay Femenina	1	(Argentina) Maribel Aguirre; Team Raleigh	(Uruguay) Florencia Revetria; Armonía Cycles Club	(Uruguay) Luciana Wynants; Armonía Cycles Club	
29 October – 1 November 2026	Vuelta Ciclista del Uruguay Femenina	2	(Uruguay) Florencia Revetria; Armonía Cycles Club	Agua Marina Espínola; Paraguay (national team)	(Brazil) Tamires Radatz; Avaí F.C - FME Florianópolis - APGF	
29 October – 1 November 2026	Vuelta Ciclista del Uruguay Femenina	3	(Argentina) Cala Bocchino; Trans Don Anibal - Damico	Agua Marina Espínola; Paraguay (national team)	(Argentina) Maribel Aguirre; Team Raleigh	
29 October – 1 November 2026	Vuelta Ciclista del Uruguay Femenina	Overall	(Uruguay) Florencia Revetria; Armonía Cycles Club; Winner	Agua Marina Espínola; Paraguay (national team); 2nd place	(Brazil) Tamires Radatz; Avaí F.C - FME Florianópolis - APGF; 3rd place	

== Continental championships ==
Championships	Race	Winner	Second	Third
CAC Road Cycling African Championships; Kenya 20–25 October (2026 summary)	Road race	Magda Nieuwoudt (RSA)	Lisa Bone (RSA)	Tiffany Keep (RSA)
CAC Road Cycling African Championships; Kenya 20–25 October (2026 summary)	Individual time trial	Diane Ingabire (RWA)	Aurelie Halbwachs (MRI)	Lucy Young (RSA)
CAC Road Cycling African Championships; Kenya 20–25 October (2026 summary)	Individual time trial (U23)	Jazilla Mwamikazi (RWA)	Marzaan Mellett (RSA)	Kahsay Tsige Kiros (ETH)
CAC Road Cycling African Championships; Kenya 20–25 October (2026 summary)	Road race (Junior)	Madison Bateson (RSA)	Joudy El Sayed (EGY)	Mercy Eragae (KEN)
CAC Road Cycling African Championships; Kenya 20–25 October (2026 summary)	Individual time trial (Junior)	Yvonne Masengesho (RWA)	Joudy El Sayed (EGY)	Rahel Gimbato (ETH)
CAC Road Cycling African Championships; Kenya 20–25 October (2026 summary)	Road race (Youth)	Olivia Beamish (ZIM)	Gloria Agasaro (RWA)	Liza Jehovaire (RWA)
CAC Road Cycling African Championships; Kenya 20–25 October (2026 summary)	Mixed Team Time Trial	South Africa (RSA); Lisa Bone; Gustav Basson; Ryno Schutte; Lucy Young; Magda Nieuwoudt; Joshua Ethan Dike	Mauritius (MRI); Lucie de Marigny-Lagesse; Aurelie Halbwachs; Raphaëlle Lamusse; Aurelien de Comarmond; Alexandre Mayer; Daniel Yon Hin	Rwanda (RWA); Xaveline Nirere; Jazilla Mwamikazi; Diane Ingabire; Etienne Tuyizere; Eric Muhoza; Shemu Nsengiyumva

== Others ==
Championships	Race	Winner	Second	Third
2026 Summer Youth Olympics; Senegal 7–9 November 2026 (2026 summary)	Road race	Angelina Novolodskaya; Russia	Elsie Apps; Australia	Linda Sítková; Czech Republic
2026 Summer Youth Olympics; Senegal 7–9 November 2026 (2026 summary)	Individual time trial	Anel Tashbay; Kazakhstan	Karolína Hajduková; Slovakia	Angelina Novolodskaya; Russia
2027 Island Games; Faroe Islands 3–7 July 2027 (2027 summary)	Road race			
2027 Island Games; Faroe Islands 3–7 July 2027 (2027 summary)	Individual time trial			
2027 Pacific Games; Tahiti 2–4 August 2027 (2027 summary)	Road race			
2027 Pacific Games; Tahiti 2–4 August 2027 (2027 summary)	Individual time trial			
2027 Pan American Games; Peru 1–8 August 2027 (2027 summary)	Road race			
2027 Pan American Games; Peru 1–8 August 2027 (2027 summary)	Individual time trial			
2027 SEA Games; Malaysia 18–29 September 2027 (2027 summary)	Road race			
2027 SEA Games; Malaysia 18–29 September 2027 (2027 summary)	Individual time trial			
