= Marco Zanotti =

Marco Zanotti may refer to:

- Marco Zanotti (cyclist, born 1974), Italian cyclist
- Marco Zanotti (cyclist, born 1988), Italian cyclist
