= 2021 Presidential Tour of Turkey =

Cycling race

2021 UCI ProSeries 2021 UCI Europe Tour

Race details
- Dates: 11–18 April 2021
- Stages: 8
- Distance: 1,244 km (773 mi)
- Winning time: 29h 19' 40"

Results
Jersey awarded to the overall winner	Winner	José Manuel Díaz (ESP)	(Delko)
	Second	Jay Vine (AUS)	(Alpecin–Fenix)
	Third	Eduardo Sepúlveda (ARG)	(Androni Giocattoli–Sidermec)
Jersey awarded to the points classification winner	Points	Jasper Philipsen (BEL)	(Alpecin–Fenix)
Jersey awarded to the mountains classification winner	Mountains	Vitaliy Buts (UKR)	(Salcano–Sakarya BB Team)
Jersey awarded to the sprints classification winner	Sprints	Ivar Slik (NED)	(Abloc CT)
	Team	Delko	

The 2021 Presidential Tour of Turkey was a road cycling stage race that took place between 11 and 18 April 2021 in Turkey. It was the 56th edition of the Presidential Tour of Turkey. The race has previously been a part of the UCI World Tour up until 2019, but it was relegated in 2020. This edition was the race's first as a 2.Pro event on the UCI ProSeries and UCI Europe Tour calendars since its demotion, with the 2020 edition having been cancelled due to the COVID-19 pandemic.

== Teams ==
Three UCI WorldTeams, fourteen UCI ProTeams and eight UCI Continental teams participated in the race. Of the twenty-five teams, Deceuninck–Quick-Step, Gazprom–RusVelo, and Team SKS Sauerland NRW, with six riders each, were the only ones that did not field the maximum allowed of seven riders. UCI ProTeam Vini Zabù was originally invited to participate, but they imposed a self-suspension on racing after one of their riders received a positive anti-doping test. From the 171 riders that started the race, 139 finished.

UCI WorldTeams

- Astana–Premier Tech
- Deceuninck–Quick-Step
- Israel Start-Up Nation

UCI ProTeams

- Alpecin–Fenix
- Androni Giocattoli–Sidermec
- B&B Hotels p/b KTM
- Bardiani–CSF–Faizanè
- Bingoal Pauwels Sauces WB
- Burgos BH
- Caja Rural–Seguros RGA
- Delko
- Eolo–Kometa
- Euskaltel–Euskadi
- Gazprom–RusVelo
- Rally Cycling
- Team Novo Nordisk
- Uno-X Pro Cycling Team
- ~~Vini Zabù~~

UCI Continental Teams

- Abloc CT
- Minsk Cycling Club
- Nippo–Provence–PTS Conti
- Salcano–Sakarya BB Team
- Spor Toto Cycling Team
- Team Sapura Cycling
- Team SKS Sauerland NRW
- Wildlife Generation Pro Cycling

== Route ==
The 2021 edition includes eight stages, up from six in 2019, covering 1,338.9 kilometres (832.0 mi) over eight days. The first stage had to be altered due to heavy snow along the original route, reducing the total distance to 1,244 kilometres (773 mi).

Stage characteristics and winners
Stage	Date	Course	Distance	Type	Stage winner
1	11 April	Konya to Konya (Note: Stage 1, originally covering 167.3 kilometres (104.0 mi) from Nevşehir to Ürgüp, was initially cancelled due to heavy snow storms. However, hours later, race officials organized an alternate route for the stage in and around Konya, which then became the host of the first two stages. This new route was essentially a shorter version of the route for stage 2, except the race would turn east onto the D696 highway instead of heading south to take on a longer loop as they would for the second stage.)	72.4 km (45.0 mi)	Flat stage	Arvid de Kleijn (NED)
2	12 April	Konya to Konya	144.9 km (90.0 mi)	Flat stage	Mark Cavendish (GBR)
3	13 April	Beyşehir to Alanya	212.6 km (132.1 mi)	Flat stage	Mark Cavendish (GBR)
4	14 April	Alanya to Kemer	184.4 km (114.6 mi)	Flat stage	Mark Cavendish (GBR)
5	15 April	Kemer to Elmalı	160.3 km (99.6 mi)	Mountain stage	José Manuel Díaz (ESP)
6	16 April	Fethiye to Marmaris	129.1 km (80.2 mi)	Hilly stage	Jasper Philipsen (BEL)
7	17 April	Marmaris to Turgutreis	180 km (110 mi)	Flat stage	Jasper Philipsen (BEL)
8	18 April	Bodrum to Kuşadası	160.3 km (99.6 mi)	Hilly stage	Mark Cavendish (GBR)
Total			~~1,338.9 km (832.0 mi)~~ 1,244 km (773 mi)		

== Stages ==
=== Stage 1 ===
11 April 2021 — ~~Nevşehir to Ürgüp, 167.3 km (104.0 mi)~~ Konya to Konya, 72.4 km (45.0 mi)

Stage 1 Result
Rank	Rider	Team	Time
1	Arvid de Kleijn (NED)	Rally Cycling	1h 35' 38"
2	Kristoffer Halvorsen (NOR)	Uno-X Pro Cycling Team	+ 0"
3	Pierre Barbier (FRA)	Delko	+ 0"
4	Mark Cavendish (GBR)	Deceuninck–Quick-Step	+ 0"
5	Jasper Philipsen (BEL)	Alpecin–Fenix	+ 0"
6	André Greipel (GER)	Israel Start-Up Nation	+ 0"
7	Giovanni Lonardi (ITA)	Bardiani–CSF–Faizanè	+ 0"
8	Manuel Belletti (ITA)	Eolo–Kometa	+ 0"
9	Manuel Peñalver (ESP)	Burgos BH	+ 0"
10	Eduard-Michael Grosu (ROU)	Delko	+ 0"

General classification after Stage 1
Rank	Rider	Team	Time
1	Arvid de Kleijn (NED)	Rally Cycling	1h 35' 28"
2	Kristoffer Halvorsen (NOR)	Uno-X Pro Cycling Team	+ 4"
3	Pierre Barbier (FRA)	Delko	+ 6"
4	Sean De Bie (BEL)	Bingoal Pauwels Sauces WB	+ 7"
5	Ivar Slik (NED)	Abloc CT	+ 8"
6	Vitaliy Buts (UKR)	Salcano–Sakarya BB Team	+ 9"
7	Mark Cavendish (GBR)	Deceuninck–Quick-Step	+ 10"
8	Jasper Philipsen (BEL)	Alpecin–Fenix	+ 10"
9	André Greipel (GER)	Israel Start-Up Nation	+ 10"
10	Giovanni Lonardi (ITA)	Bardiani–CSF–Faizanè	+ 10"

=== Stage 2 ===
12 April 2021 — Konya to Konya, 144.9 km (90.0 mi)

Stage 2 Result
Rank	Rider	Team	Time
1	Mark Cavendish (GBR)	Deceuninck–Quick-Step	3h 17' 26"
2	Jasper Philipsen (BEL)	Alpecin–Fenix	+ 0"
3	André Greipel (GER)	Israel Start-Up Nation	+ 0"
4	Arvid de Kleijn (NED)	Rally Cycling	+ 0"
5	Stanisław Aniołkowski (POL)	Bingoal Pauwels Sauces WB	+ 0"
6	Manuel Peñalver (ESP)	Burgos BH	+ 0"
7	Giovanni Lonardi (ITA)	Bardiani–CSF–Faizanè	+ 0"
8	Luca Mozzato (ITA)	B&B Hotels p/b KTM	+ 0"
9	Rick Zabel (GER)	Israel Start-Up Nation	+ 0"
10	Søren Wærenskjold (NOR)	Uno-X Pro Cycling Team	+ 0"

General classification after Stage 2
Rank	Rider	Team	Time
1	Mark Cavendish (GBR)	Deceuninck–Quick-Step	4h 52' 54"
2	Arvid de Kleijn (NED)	Rally Cycling	+ 0"
3	Jasper Philipsen (BEL)	Alpecin–Fenix	+ 4"
4	Kristoffer Halvorsen (NOR)	Uno-X Pro Cycling Team	+ 4"
5	André Greipel (GER)	Israel Start-Up Nation	+ 6"
6	Pierre Barbier (FRA)	Delko	+ 6"
6	Artyom Zakharov (KAZ)	Astana–Premier Tech	+ 7"
8	Sean De Bie (BEL)	Bingoal Pauwels Sauces WB	+ 7"
9	Ivar Slik (NED)	Abloc CT	+ 8"
10	Vitaliy Buts (UKR)	Salcano–Sakarya BB Team	+ 8"

=== Stage 3 ===
13 April 2021 — Beyşehir to Alanya, 212.6 km (132.1 mi)

Stage 3 Result
Rank	Rider	Team	Time
1	Mark Cavendish (GBR)	Deceuninck–Quick-Step	5h 10' 30"
2	Jasper Philipsen (BEL)	Alpecin–Fenix	+ 0"
3	Stanisław Aniołkowski (POL)	Bingoal Pauwels Sauces WB	+ 0"
4	Kristoffer Halvorsen (NOR)	Uno-X Pro Cycling Team	+ 0"
5	André Greipel (GER)	Israel Start-Up Nation	+ 0"
6	Manuel Belletti (ITA)	Eolo–Kometa	+ 0"
7	Arvid de Kleijn (NED)	Rally Cycling	+ 0"
8	Lionel Taminiaux (BEL)	Alpecin–Fenix	+ 0"
9	Eduard-Michael Grosu (ROU)	Delko	+ 0"
10	Giovanni Lonardi (ITA)	Bardiani–CSF–Faizanè	+ 0"

General classification after Stage 3
Rank	Rider	Team	Time
1	Mark Cavendish (GBR)	Deceuninck–Quick-Step	10h 03' 14"
2	Jasper Philipsen (BEL)	Alpecin–Fenix	+ 8"
3	Arvid de Kleijn (NED)	Rally Cycling	+ 10"
4	Kristoffer Halvorsen (NOR)	Uno-X Pro Cycling Team	+ 14"
5	André Greipel (GER)	Israel Start-Up Nation	+ 16"
6	Stanisław Aniołkowski (POL)	Bingoal Pauwels Sauces WB	+ 16"
7	Pierre Barbier (FRA)	Delko	+ 16"
8	Artyom Zakharov (KAZ)	Astana–Premier Tech	+ 17"
9	Garikoitz Bravo (ESP)	Euskaltel–Euskadi	+ 17"
10	Sean De Bie (BEL)	Bingoal Pauwels Sauces WB	+ 17"

=== Stage 4 ===
14 April 2021 — Alanya to Kemer, 184.4 km (114.6 mi)

Stage 4 Result
Rank	Rider	Team	Time
1	Mark Cavendish (GBR)	Deceuninck–Quick-Step	4h 09' 38"
2	Jasper Philipsen (BEL)	Alpecin–Fenix	+ 0"
3	Stanisław Aniołkowski (POL)	Bingoal Pauwels Sauces WB	+ 0"
4	Arvid de Kleijn (NED)	Rally Cycling	+ 0"
5	Pierre Barbier (FRA)	Delko	+ 0"
6	David González (ESP)	Caja Rural–Seguros RGA	+ 0"
7	Lars Kulbe (GER)	Team SKS Sauerland NRW	+ 0"
8	Luca Mozzato (ITA)	B&B Hotels p/b KTM	+ 0"
9	Mārtiņš Pluto (LAT)	Abloc CT	+ 0"
10	Damiano Cima (ITA)	Gazprom–RusVelo	+ 0"

General classification after Stage 4
Rank	Rider	Team	Time
1	Mark Cavendish (GBR)	Deceuninck–Quick-Step	14h 12' 42"
2	Jasper Philipsen (BEL)	Alpecin–Fenix	+ 12"
3	Arvid de Kleijn (NED)	Rally Cycling	+ 20"
4	Stanisław Aniołkowski (POL)	Bingoal Pauwels Sauces WB	+ 22"
5	Kristoffer Halvorsen (NOR)	Uno-X Pro Cycling Team	+ 24"
6	Pierre Barbier (FRA)	Delko	+ 26"
7	André Greipel (GER)	Israel Start-Up Nation	+ 26"
8	Artyom Zakharov (KAZ)	Astana–Premier Tech	+ 27"
9	Garikoitz Bravo (ESP)	Euskaltel–Euskadi	+ 27"
10	Nur Aiman Rosli (MAS)	Team Sapura Cycling	+ 27"

=== Stage 5 ===
15 April 2021 — Kemer to Elmalı, 160.3 km (99.6 mi)

Stage 5 Result
Rank	Rider	Team	Time
1	José Manuel Díaz (ESP)	Delko	4h 25' 25"
2	Jay Vine (AUS)	Alpecin–Fenix	+ 0"
3	Eduardo Sepúlveda (ARG)	Androni Giocattoli–Sidermec	+ 0"
4	Anders Halland Johannessen (NOR)	Uno-X Pro Cycling Team	+ 15"
5	Jhojan García (COL)	Caja Rural–Seguros RGA	+ 15"
6	Merhawi Kudus (ERI)	Astana–Premier Tech	+ 18"
7	Anthon Charmig (DEN)	Uno-X Pro Cycling Team	+ 20"
8	Delio Fernández (ESP)	Delko	+ 23"
9	Quentin Pacher (FRA)	B&B Hotels p/b KTM	+ 38"
10	Artem Nych (RUS)	Gazprom–RusVelo	+ 42"

General classification after Stage 5
Rank	Rider	Team	Time
1	José Manuel Díaz (ESP)	Delko	18h 38' 27"
2	Jay Vine (AUS)	Alpecin–Fenix	+ 4"
3	Eduardo Sepúlveda (ARG)	Androni Giocattoli–Sidermec	+ 6"
4	Jhojan García (COL)	Caja Rural–Seguros RGA	+ 25"
5	Merhawi Kudus (ERI)	Astana–Premier Tech	+ 28"
6	Anthon Charmig (DEN)	Uno-X Pro Cycling Team	+ 30"
7	Delio Fernández (ESP)	Delko	+ 33"
8	Quentin Pacher (FRA)	B&B Hotels p/b KTM	+ 48"
9	Artem Nych (RUS)	Gazprom–RusVelo	+ 52"
10	Anders Halland Johannessen (NOR)	Uno-X Pro Cycling Team	+ 55"

=== Stage 6 ===
16 April 2021 — Fethiye to Marmaris, 129.1 km (80.2 mi)

Stage 6 Result
Rank	Rider	Team	Time
1	Jasper Philipsen (BEL)	Alpecin–Fenix	2h 55' 50"
2	André Greipel (GER)	Israel Start-Up Nation	+ 0"
3	Kristoffer Halvorsen (NOR)	Uno-X Pro Cycling Team	+ 0"
4	Mark Cavendish (GBR)	Deceuninck–Quick-Step	+ 0"
5	Stanisław Aniołkowski (POL)	Bingoal Pauwels Sauces WB	+ 0"
6	Luca Mozzato (ITA)	B&B Hotels p/b KTM	+ 0"
7	Giovanni Lonardi (ITA)	Bardiani–CSF–Faizanè	+ 0"
8	Vincenzo Albanese (ITA)	Eolo–Kometa	+ 0"
9	Igor Boev (RUS)	Gazprom–RusVelo	+ 0"
10	Mārtiņš Pluto (LAT)	Abloc CT	+ 0"

General classification after Stage 6
Rank	Rider	Team	Time
1	José Manuel Díaz (ESP)	Delko	21h 34' 17"
2	Jay Vine (AUS)	Alpecin–Fenix	+ 4"
3	Eduardo Sepúlveda (ARG)	Androni Giocattoli–Sidermec	+ 6"
4	Jhojan García (COL)	Caja Rural–Seguros RGA	+ 25"
5	Merhawi Kudus (ERI)	Astana–Premier Tech	+ 28"
6	Anthon Charmig (DEN)	Uno-X Pro Cycling Team	+ 30"
7	Delio Fernández (ESP)	Delko	+ 33"
8	Quentin Pacher (FRA)	B&B Hotels p/b KTM	+ 48"
9	Artem Nych (RUS)	Gazprom–RusVelo	+ 52"
10	Anders Halland Johannessen (NOR)	Uno-X Pro Cycling Team	+ 55"

=== Stage 7 ===
17 April 2021 — Marmaris to Turgutreis, 180 km (110 mi)

Stage 7 Result
Rank	Rider	Team	Time
1	Jasper Philipsen (BEL)	Alpecin–Fenix	4h 20' 45"
2	André Greipel (GER)	Israel Start-Up Nation	+ 0"
3	Mark Cavendish (GBR)	Deceuninck–Quick-Step	+ 0"
4	Stanisław Aniołkowski (POL)	Bingoal Pauwels Sauces WB	+ 0"
5	Vincenzo Albanese (ITA)	Eolo–Kometa	+ 0"
6	Rick Zabel (GER)	Israel Start-Up Nation	+ 0"
7	Luca Wackermann (ITA)	Eolo–Kometa	+ 0"
8	Gleb Brussenskiy (KAZ)	Astana–Premier Tech	+ 0"
9	Giovanni Lonardi (ITA)	Bardiani–CSF–Faizanè	+ 0"
10	Ahmet Örken (TUR)	Team Sapura Cycling	+ 0"

General classification after Stage 7
Rank	Rider	Team	Time
1	José Manuel Díaz (ESP)	Delko	25h 55' 02"
2	Jay Vine (AUS)	Alpecin–Fenix	+ 1"
3	Eduardo Sepúlveda (ARG)	Androni Giocattoli–Sidermec	+ 6"
4	Jhojan García (COL)	Caja Rural–Seguros RGA	+ 25"
5	Merhawi Kudus (ERI)	Astana–Premier Tech	+ 28"
6	Anthon Charmig (DEN)	Uno-X Pro Cycling Team	+ 30"
7	Delio Fernández (ESP)	Delko	+ 33"
8	Quentin Pacher (FRA)	B&B Hotels p/b KTM	+ 48"
9	Artem Nych (RUS)	Gazprom–RusVelo	+ 52"
10	Anders Halland Johannessen (NOR)	Uno-X Pro Cycling Team	+ 55"

=== Stage 8 ===
18 April 2021 — Bodrum to Kuşadası, 160.3 km (99.6 mi)

Stage 8 Result
Rank	Rider	Team	Time
1	Mark Cavendish (GBR)	Deceuninck–Quick-Step	3h 24' 38"
2	Jasper Philipsen (BEL)	Alpecin–Fenix	+ 0"
3	Kristoffer Halvorsen (NOR)	Uno-X Pro Cycling Team	+ 0"
4	André Greipel (GER)	Israel Start-Up Nation	+ 0"
5	Giovanni Lonardi (ITA)	Bardiani–CSF–Faizanè	+ 0"
6	Vincenzo Albanese (ITA)	Eolo–Kometa	+ 0"
7	Stanisław Aniołkowski (POL)	Bingoal Pauwels Sauces WB	+ 0"
8	Damiano Cima (ITA)	Gazprom–RusVelo	+ 0"
9	Jokin Aranburu (ESP)	Euskaltel–Euskadi	+ 0"
10	Ahmet Örken (TUR)	Team Sapura Cycling	+ 0"

General classification after Stage 8
Rank	Rider	Team	Time
1	José Manuel Díaz (ESP)	Delko	29h 19' 40"
2	Jay Vine (AUS)	Alpecin–Fenix	+ 1"
3	Eduardo Sepúlveda (ARG)	Androni Giocattoli–Sidermec	+ 6"
4	Jhojan García (COL)	Caja Rural–Seguros RGA	+ 25"
5	Merhawi Kudus (ERI)	Astana–Premier Tech	+ 28"
6	Anthon Charmig (DEN)	Uno-X Pro Cycling Team	+ 30"
7	Delio Fernández (ESP)	Delko	+ 33"
8	Artem Nych (RUS)	Gazprom–RusVelo	+ 52"
9	Anders Halland Johannessen (NOR)	Uno-X Pro Cycling Team	+ 55"
10	Garikoitz Bravo (ESP)	Euskaltel–Euskadi	+ 1' 01"

== Classification leadership table ==
Classification leadership by stage
Stage	Winner	General classification	Points classification	Mountains classification	Turkish Beauties Sprints classification	Team classification
1	Arvid de Kleijn	Arvid de Kleijn	Arvid de Kleijn	Ivar Slik	Sean De Bie	Delko
2	Mark Cavendish	Mark Cavendish	Mark Cavendish	Vitaliy Buts	Artyom Zakharov	Alpecin–Fenix
3	Mark Cavendish	Mark Cavendish	Mark Cavendish	Vitaliy Buts	Artyom Zakharov	Bingoal Pauwels Sauces WB
4	Mark Cavendish	Mark Cavendish	Mark Cavendish	Vitaliy Buts	Ivar Slik	Abloc CT
5	José Manuel Díaz	José Manuel Díaz	Mark Cavendish	Vitaliy Buts	Ivar Slik	Delko
6	Jasper Philipsen	José Manuel Díaz	Mark Cavendish	Vitaliy Buts	Ivar Slik	Delko
7	Jasper Philipsen	José Manuel Díaz	Jasper Philipsen	Vitaliy Buts	Ivar Slik	Delko
8	Mark Cavendish	José Manuel Díaz	Jasper Philipsen	Vitaliy Buts	Ivar Slik	Delko
Final		José Manuel Díaz	Jasper Philipsen	Vitaliy Buts	Ivar Slik	Delko

- On stage 2, Kristoffer Halvorsen, who was second in the points classification, wore the green jersey, because first-placed Arvid de Kleijn wore the turquoise jersey as the leader of the general classification. Arvid de Kleijn on stage 3 and Jasper Philipsen on stages 4 and 5 wore the green jersey on behalf of Mark Cavendish for the same reason.

== Final classification standings ==
Legend
Denotes the winner of the general classification	Denotes the winner of the mountains classification
Denotes the winner of the points classification	Denotes the winner of the Turkish Beauties Sprints classification

=== General classification ===
Final general classification (1–10)
Rank	Rider	Team	Time
1	José Manuel Díaz (ESP)	Delko	29h 19' 40"
2	Jay Vine (AUS)	Alpecin–Fenix	+ 1"
3	Eduardo Sepúlveda (ARG)	Androni Giocattoli–Sidermec	+ 6"
4	Jhojan García (COL)	Caja Rural–Seguros RGA	+ 25"
5	Merhawi Kudus (ERI)	Astana–Premier Tech	+ 28"
6	Anthon Charmig (DEN)	Uno-X Pro Cycling Team	+ 30"
7	Delio Fernández (ESP)	Delko	+ 33"
8	Artem Nych (RUS)	Gazprom–RusVelo	+ 52"
9	Anders Halland Johannessen (NOR)	Uno-X Pro Cycling Team	+ 55"
10	Garikoitz Bravo (ESP)	Euskaltel–Euskadi	+ 1' 01"

=== Points classification ===
Final points classification (1–10)
Rank	Rider	Team	Points
1	Jasper Philipsen (BEL)	Alpecin–Fenix	101
2	Mark Cavendish (GBR)	Deceuninck–Quick-Step	97
3	André Greipel (GER)	Israel Start-Up Nation	74
4	Stanisław Aniołkowski (POL)	Bingoal Pauwels Sauces WB	69
5	Kristoffer Halvorsen (NOR)	Uno-X Pro Cycling Team	59
6	Giovanni Lonardi (ITA)	Bardiani–CSF–Faizanè	51
7	Vincenzo Albanese (ITA)	Eolo–Kometa	29
8	Manuel Peñalver (ESP)	Burgos BH	27
9	David González (ESP)	Caja Rural–Seguros RGA	25
10	Jay Vine (AUS)	Alpecin–Fenix	23

=== Mountains classification ===
Final mountains classification (1–10)
Rank	Rider	Team	Points
1	Vitaliy Buts (UKR)	Salcano–Sakarya BB Team	25
2	Danilo Celano (ITA)	Team Sapura Cycling	22
3	Mirco Maestri (ITA)	Bardiani–CSF–Faizanè	11
4	Jay Vine (AUS)	Alpecin–Fenix	11
5	José Manuel Díaz (ESP)	Delko	10
6	Nicola Venchiarutti (ITA)	Androni Giocattoli–Sidermec	8
7	Francesco Gavazzi (ITA)	Eolo–Kometa	8
8	Jhojan García (COL)	Caja Rural–Seguros RGA	7
9	Alessandro Tonelli (ITA)	Bardiani–CSF–Faizanè	7
10	Merhawi Kudus (ERI)	Astana–Premier Tech	6

=== Turkish Beauties Sprints classification ===
Final Turkish Beauties Sprints classification (1–10)
Rank	Rider	Team	Points
1	Ivar Slik (NED)	Abloc CT	13
2	Sean De Bie (BEL)	Bingoal Pauwels Sauces WB	10
3	Julen Irizar (ESP)	Euskaltel–Euskadi	5
4	Nicola Venchiarutti (ITA)	Androni Giocattoli–Sidermec	5
5	Artyom Zakharov (KAZ)	Astana–Premier Tech	5
6	Nils Sinschek (NED)	Abloc CT	5
7	Delio Fernández (ESP)	Delko	3
8	Joel Suter (SUI)	Bingoal Pauwels Sauces WB	3
9	Samuele Zoccarato (ITA)	Bardiani–CSF–Faizanè	3
10	Francesco Gavazzi (ITA)	Eolo–Kometa	3

=== Team classification ===
Final team classification (1–10)
Rank	Team	Time
1	(France) Delko	88h 01' 14"
2	(Kazakhstan) Astana–Premier Tech	+ 1' 04"
3	(Russia) Gazprom–RusVelo	+ 3' 57"
4	(Spain) Euskaltel–Euskadi	+ 5' 25"
5	(Italy) Bardiani–CSF–Faizanè	+ 6' 02"
6	(Italy) Eolo–Kometa	+ 8' 47"
7	Israel Start-Up Nation	+ 9' 34"
8	(Spain) Burgos BH	+ 10' 17"
9	(Norway) Uno-X Pro Cycling Team	+ 11' 20"
10	(Italy) Androni Giocattoli–Sidermec	+ 11' 51"
