= Arthur Tenn =

Jamaican cyclist

Personal information
- Born: 15 March 1964 (age 62)

Cycling career
- Sport: Cycling

Arthur Tenn (born 15 March 1964) is a Jamaican former cyclist. He competed in the road race event at the 1984, 1988 and the 1992 Summer Olympics. He was the oldest cyclist to represent Jamaica at the Olympics. Ahead of the 2014 Commonwealth Games in Glasgow, Tenn was the President of the Jamaica Cycling Federation and the team manager of the Jamaican cycling team.
