= 2021 Citizens' Action Party presidential primary =

Costa Rican primary election

- 22 August 2021
- Turnout: 16,515
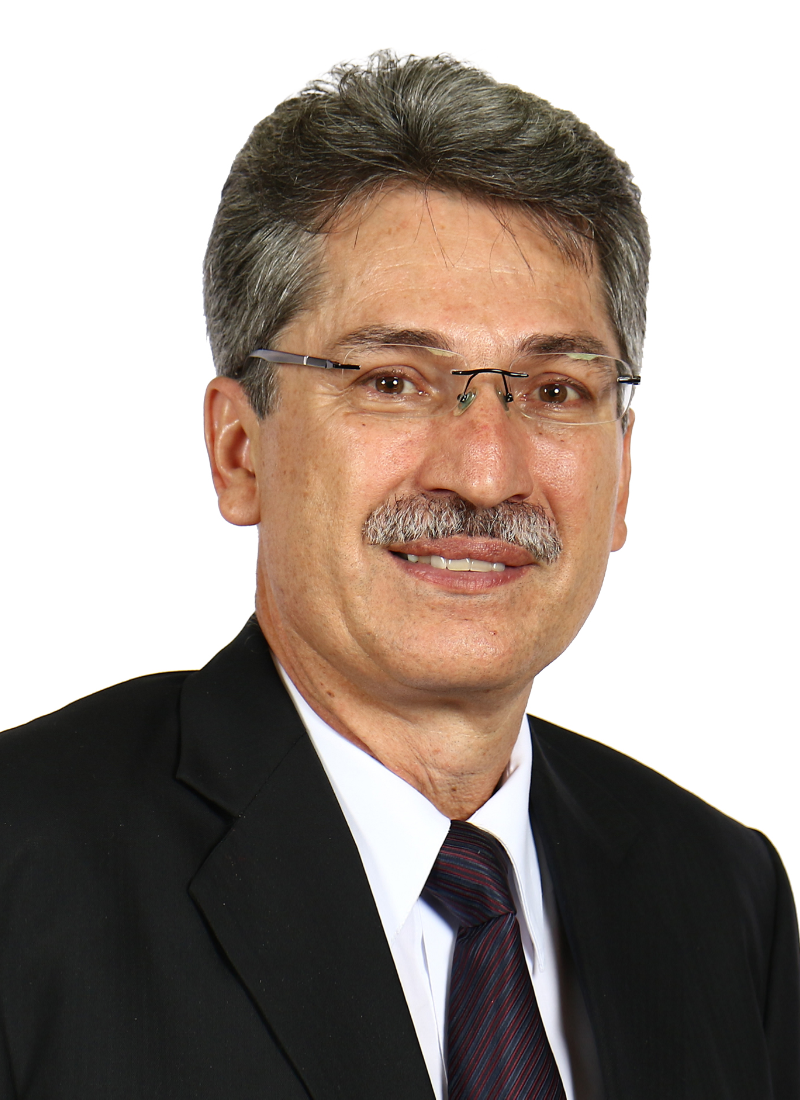

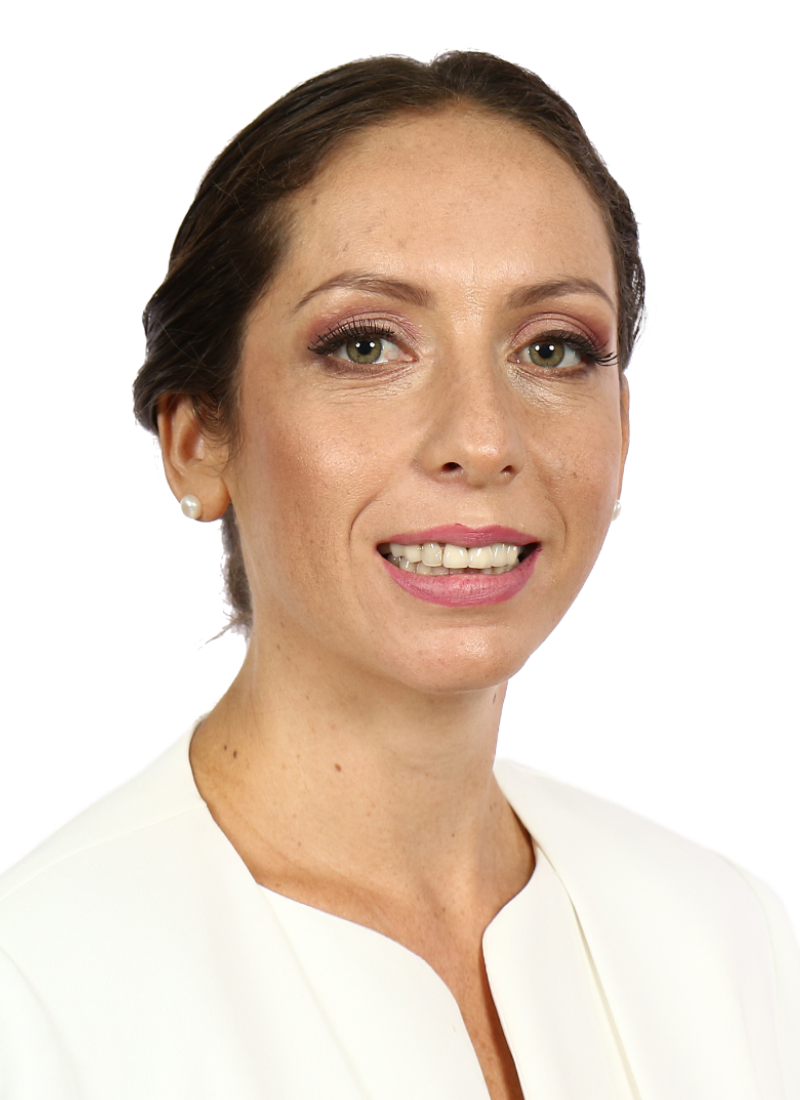

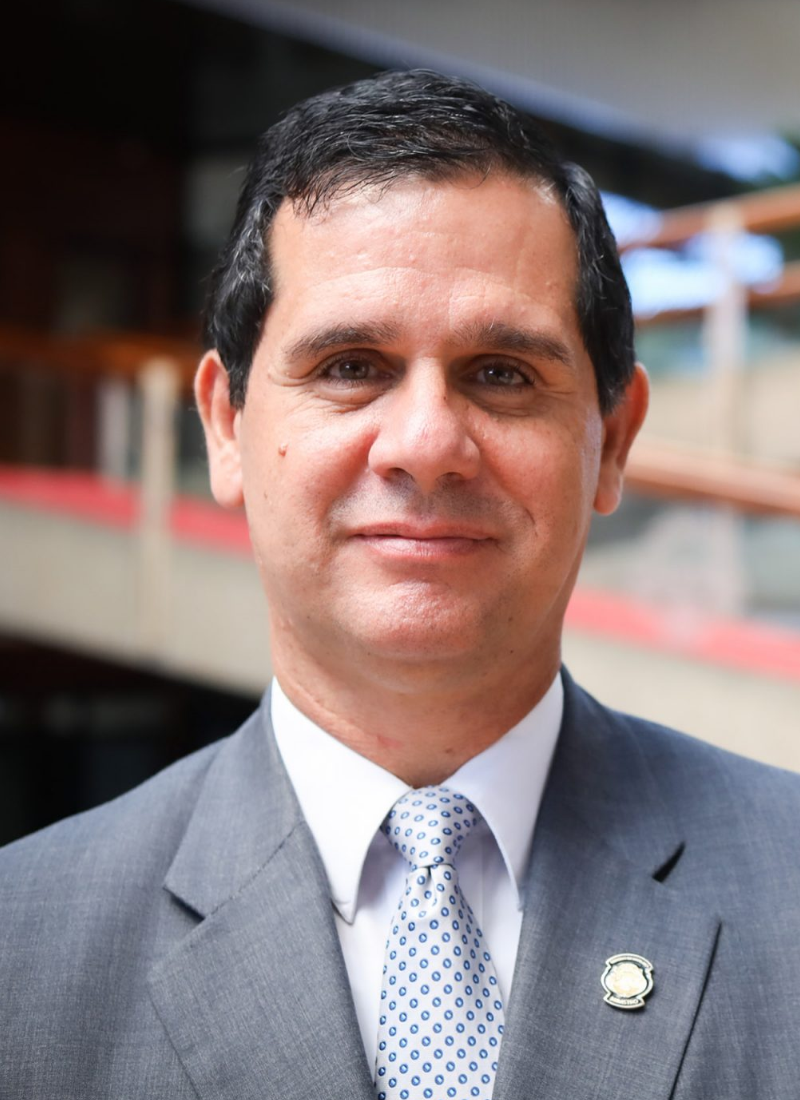
Nominee	Welmer Ramos González	Carolina Hidalgo Herrera	Hernán Solano Venegas
Party	PAC	PAC	PAC
Popular vote	7,783	7,632	548
Percentage	47.13%	46.21%	3.31%
Previous Presidential Candidate
Carlos Alvarado Quesada
PAC
Presidential Candidate
Welmer Ramos González
PAC

The 2021 Citizens' Action Party presidential primary or National Citizen Convention will be the primary selection process by which supporters of the Citizen Action Party selected their presidential candidate for the 2022 general elections on 8 August 2021.

The Citizen Action Party will hold its Convention in August, postponing it due to the pandemic.

== History ==
In the Citizens' Action Party, rumors were heard about possible nominations by the president of the Costa Rican Social Security Fund, Román Macaya Hayes and the ambassador to Spain and former vice president Ana Helena Chacón, however, Macaya denied it through a press release and Chacón assured that she could not refer to the matter due to her current position. The Costa Rican Constitution establishes that the President may not run for immediate reelection. Furthermore, Ministers and Executive Presidents of the autonomous institutions have to resign at least twelve months before the election is held in case they wish to run for office.

=== Inscribed ===
Before the deadline in June 2021, the following people have inscribed their candidacy_

- Hernán Solano Venegas, Former Minister of Sport and Recreation (2014-2021), Vice-Minister of Youth (2002-2006).
- Carolina Hidalgo Herrera, President of the Legislative Assembly (2018-2019) from Alajuela
- Welmer Ramos González, Deputy from Heredia, candidate on the 2017 Citizens' Action Party presidential primary.
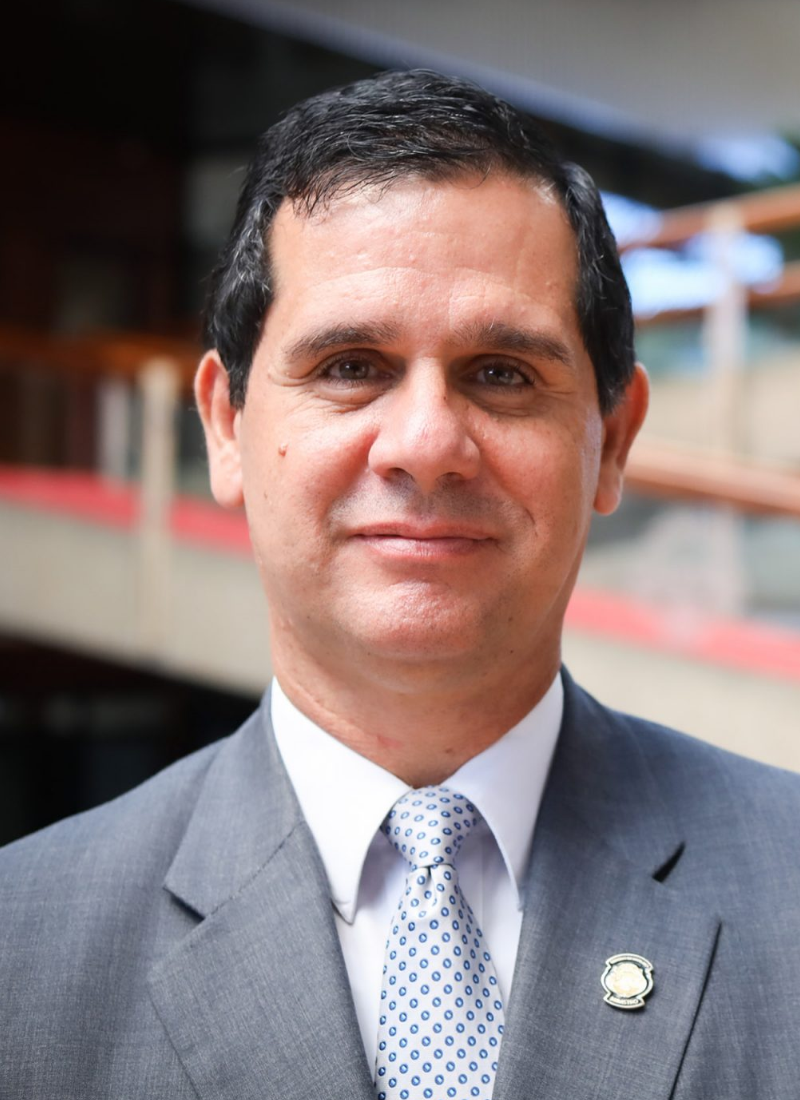
Former Minister
Hernán Solano Venegas
from San José

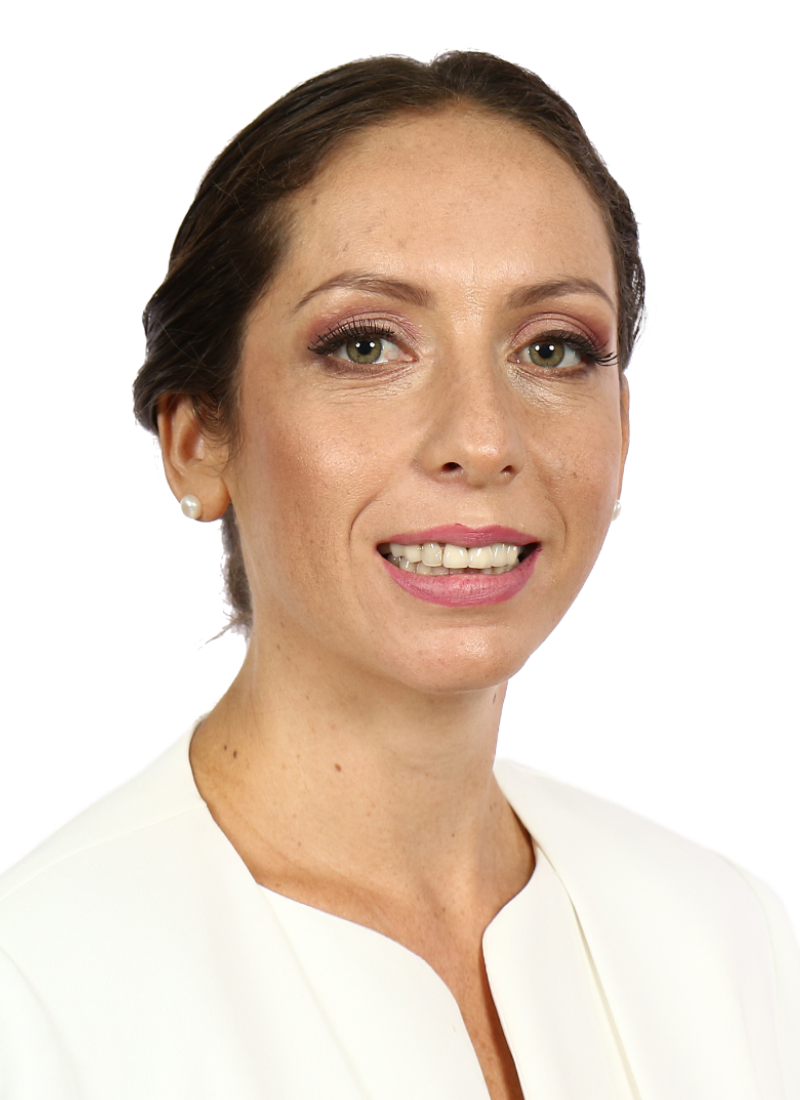
Former President of the Legislative Assembly
Carolina Hidalgo Herrera
from Alajuela

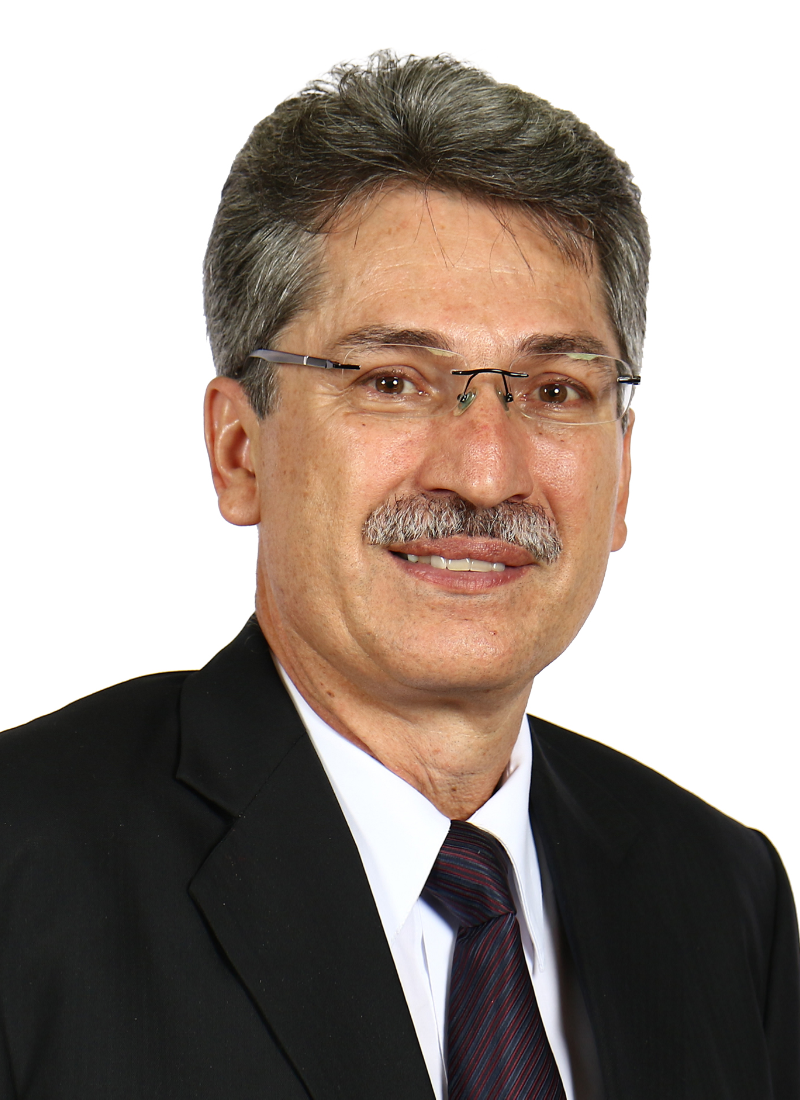
Deputy
Welmer Ramos González
from Heredia

== Withdrawals ==
Former Mayor of Curridabat and Education Minister Edgar Mora withdrew from the race due to not having the minimal time of membership in the party.

- Edgar Mora Altamirano (es:Edgar Mora Altamirano), Education Minister (2018-2019); Mayor of Curridabat (2007-2018)
- Marta Zamora Castillo, PAC co-founder, Former deputy from Alajuela (2002-2006)
- Marcia González Aguiluz, Minister of Peace and Justice (2018-2020); Citizens' Action Party president (2017-2018).
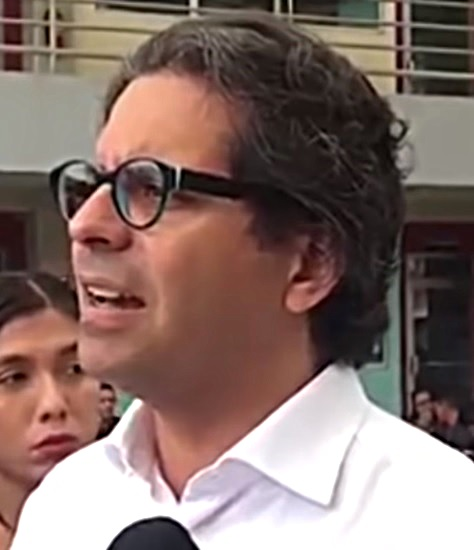
Former Minister
Edgar Mora Altamirano
from San José

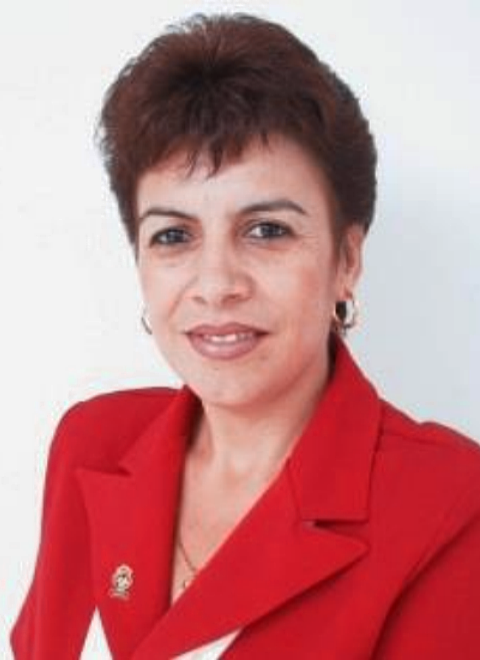
Former Deputy
Marta Zamora Castillo
from Alajuela

== Declined to be candidates ==
- Román Macaya Hayes, Executive President of the Costa Rican Social Security Fund, Former Ambassador to the United States (2014-2018), precandidate in 2010.
- Daniel Salas Peraza, Minister of Health (2018–present day).
- Laura Guido Pérez, Deputy (2018–present day) from Cartago
- Claudia Dobles Camargo; First Lady of Costa Rica (2018–present).
- Ana Helena Chacón Echeverría, Costa Rican Ambassador in Spain (2018–present day), Former Vicepresident (2014-2018), Former deputy from San José (2006-2010)
