= NCF =

NCF may refer to:

- Cyanogen fluoride, a toxic, explosive inorganic linear compound
- National Capital FreeNet, an ISP in Ottawa, Canada
- National Championship Foundation, an organization that retroactively selected NCAA college football national champions from 1869-1870 and 1872-2000
- National Christian Foundation, a US Evangelical Christian donations organization
- National Civic Federation, 1900–1920s US labor organization
- National Commerce Financial Corporation, Tennessee, NYSE symbol, 2001–2005
- National Cultural Foundation of Barbados
- National Cyber Force, a British defence and intelligence unit
- National Cybersecurity FFRDC, a US-funded research and development center operated by MITRE Corporation in support of NIST
- Nederlandsche Cocaïnefabriek, a Dutch pharmaceutical company
- New Century Foundation, a US white supremacist organization founded in 1994
- New College of Florida, a public liberal arts college in Sarasota, Florida, United States
- Next Century Foundation, a London-based think tank on Middle Eastern conflicts
- Nicaraguan Cycling Federation, the national governing body of cycle racing in Nicaragua
- Nigeria Cricket Federation, the national governing body of cricket in Nigeria
- No-Conscription Fellowship, a British pacifist organization
- Nomenclature Committee for Fungi, a committee of the International Botanical Congress
