= Jasper Ockeloen =

Dutch cyclist (born 1990)

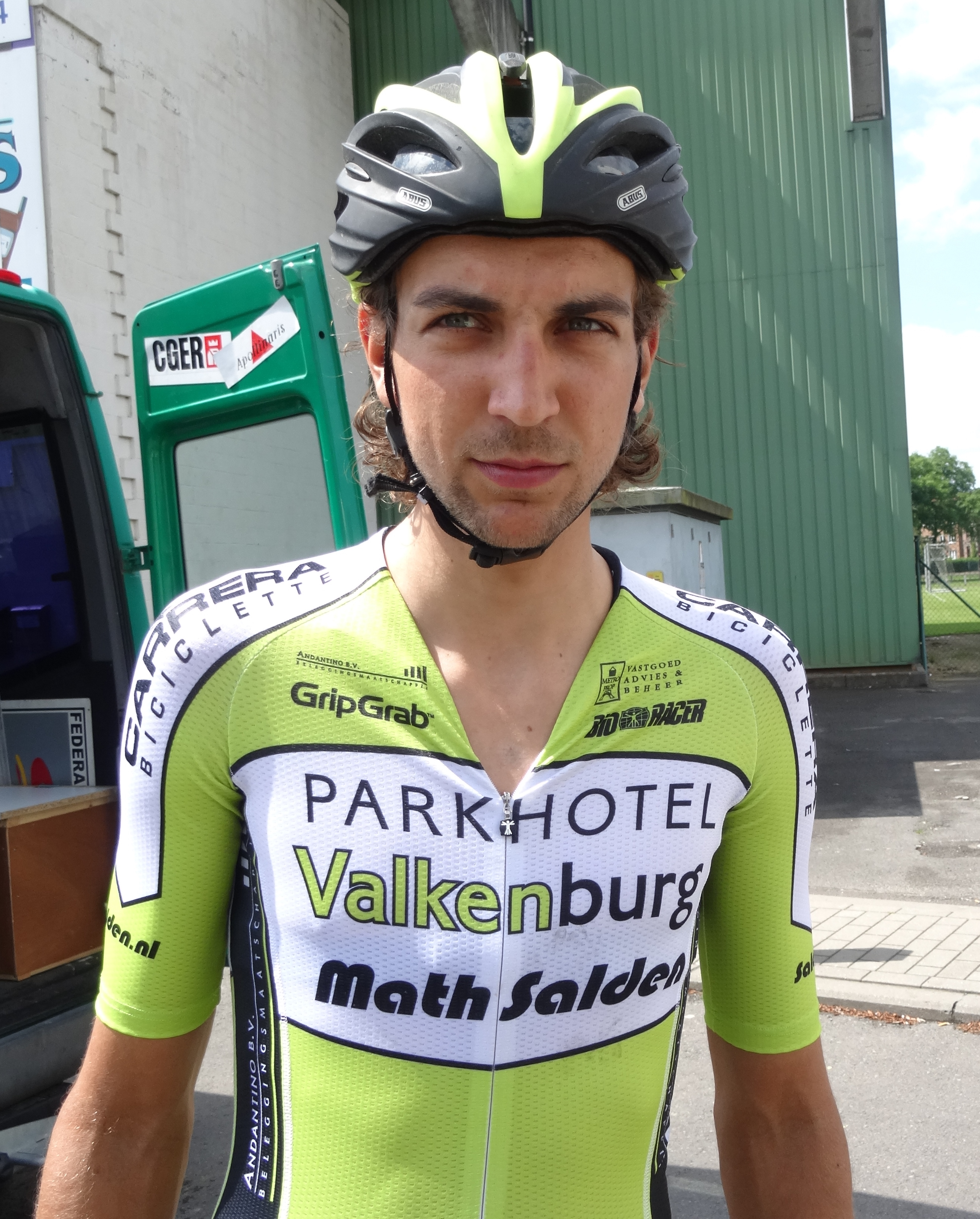
- Ockeloen in 2014.

Personal information
- Full name: Jasper Ockeloen
- Born: 10 May 1990 (age 36) Dordrecht, Netherlands
- Height: 1.86 m (6 ft 1 in)
- Weight: 66 kg (146 lb)

Cycling career
- Sport: Cycling
- Current team: Sockeloen Cycling Club
- Disciplines: Road; Mountain biking
- Role: Rider

Amateur teams
- 2012–2013: Parkhotel Rooding Valkenburg
- 2019: WASp
- 2019–: Sockeloen Cycling Club

Professional teams
- 2009–2010: Rabobank Continental Team
- 2011: Donckers Koffie–Jelly Belly
- 2014–2016: Parkhotel Valkenburg Continental Team
- 2017–2018: Monkey Town Continental Team
- 2023: Canyon Bicycles

Jasper Ockeloen (born 10 May 1990) is a Dutch cyclist, who rides for Dutch amateur team Sockeloen Cycling Club.

He is the founder of Sockeloen, a company that designs and makes cycling socks, and of the Sockeloen Cycling Club as a means to promote mountain bike marathons and beach racing. Those two disciplines have races where professionals and amateurs can ride together and bond. He himself was introduced to beach racing by his girlfriend Riejanne Markus, a professional cyclist.

In 2021 Ockeloen followed the tyretracks of Laurens ten Dam and participated in Unbound Gravel. He had a flat tyre and a problematic reparation, early in the race. After a lot of overtaking he finished in 10th place. A year later Laurens ten Dam, Thomas Dekker, Ivar Slik and Ockeloen returned for a whole month of gravel races in the US. Ockeloen won Gravel Locos solo and came third in Rule of Three. Later that year Ockeloen won a bronze medal in the Dutch national championships gravel race. These results moved Canyon to give him a professional contract for 2023.

== Major results ==
=== Road ===
2008
1st Road race, National Junior Road Championships
3rd Omloop Mandel-Leie-Schelde
9th Overall Giro della Lunigiana
2010
8th Ronde van Midden-Nederland
2014
9th Overall Sibiu Cycling Tour
9th Arno Wallaard Memorial
2015
2nd Overall Tour d'Azerbaïdjan
2nd Overall Flèche du Sud
3rd Overall Tour of Fuzhou
7th Overall Tour de Taiwan
9th Rutland–Melton CiCLE Classic

=== Mountain bike ===
2014
1st National Beach Race Championships
2016
1st UEC European Beach Race Championships
1st Cross-country marathon, National Championships
2017
1st UEC European Beach Race Championships
National Championships

2nd Cross-country marathon
5th Cross-country

2018
1st National Beach Race Championships

=== Gravel ===
2021
10th Unbound Gravel
2022
1st Gravel Locos
3rd Rule of three
3rd National Championships
2023
2nd Belgian Waffle Ride - California
UCI World Gravel Series

5th Limburg
9th Aachen

8th FNLND GRVL
10th Unbound Gravel
