= 2022 UCI America Tour =

2021–2022 UCI America Tour
- Eighteenth edition of the UCI America Tour

Details
- Dates: 31 October 2021 –
- Location: North America and South America
- Races: 6

The 2021–2022 UCI America Tour was the eighteenth season of the UCI America Tour. The season began on 31 October 2021 with the Vuelta a Venezuela and ended in October 2022.

The points leader, based on the cumulative results of previous races, wears the UCI America Tour cycling jersey. Throughout the season, points are awarded to the top finishers of stages within stage races and the final general classification standings of each of the stages races and one-day events. The quality and complexity of a race also determines how many points are awarded to the top finishers, the higher the UCI rating of a race, the more points are awarded.

The UCI ratings from highest to lowest are as follows:

- Multi-day events: 2.Pro, 2.1 and 2.2
- One-day events: 1.Pro, 1.1 and 1.2

== Events ==
=== 2021–2022 ===
Races in the 2021–2022 UCI America Tour
Race	Rating	Date	Winner	Team
Vuelta a Venezuela (2021 Edition)	2.2	31 October–7 November 2021	Jorge Abreu (VEN)	Fina Arroz-Venezuela País de Futuro
(Colombia) Cycling at the 2021 Junior Pan American Games (ITT–U23)	1.2	1 December 2021	Víctor Ocampo (COL)	Colombia (national team)
(Colombia) Cycling at the 2021 Junior Pan American Games (Road Race-U23)	1.2	3 December 2021	Gabriel Rojas (CRC)	Costa Rica (national team)
Vuelta al Ecuador	2.2	8–15 December 2021	Wilson Haro (ECU)	Team Pichincha
(Venezuela) Vuelta al Táchira	2.2	16–23 January	Roniel Campos (VEN)	Deportivo Táchira-JHS
(Argentina) Vuelta del Porvenir San Luis	2.2	9 – 13 February	Nicolás Tivani (ARG)	Agrupación Virgen de Fátima–San Juan Biker Motos
(Argentina) Vuelta Formosa Internacional	2.2	7 – 10 April	Nicolás Tivani (ARG)	Agrupación Virgen de Fátima–San Juan Biker Motos
(United States) Tour of the Gila	2.2	27 April – 1 May	Sean Gardner (USA)	CS Velo Racing
(United States) Joe Martin Stage Race	2.2	19 – 22 May	Jonathan Clarke (AUS)	Wildlife Generation Pro Cycling
Vuelta a Colombia	2.2	3 – 12 June	Fabio Duarte (COL)	Team Medellín–EPM
(Paraguay) Cycling at the 2022 South American Games (ITT)	1.2	3 October	Walter Vargas (COL)	Colombia (national team)
(Paraguay) Cycling at the 2022 South American Games (RR)	1.2	5 October	Orluis Aular (VEN)	Venezuela (national team)
(Costa Rica) 2022 Elite Road Central American Championships (ITT)	1.2	14 October	Franklin Archibold (PAN)	Panama (national team)
(Costa Rica) 2022 Elite Road Central American Championships (ITT U23)	1.2	14 October	Dylan Jiménez (CRC)	Costa Rica (national team)
(Costa Rica) 2022 Elite Road Central American Championships (RR)	1.2	16 October	Alex Julajuj (GUA)	Guatemala (national team)
(Costa Rica) 2022 Elite Road Central American Championships (RR U23)	1.2	16 October	Gabriel Rojas (CRC)	Costa Rica (national team)
