= Jhojan García =

Colombian cyclist

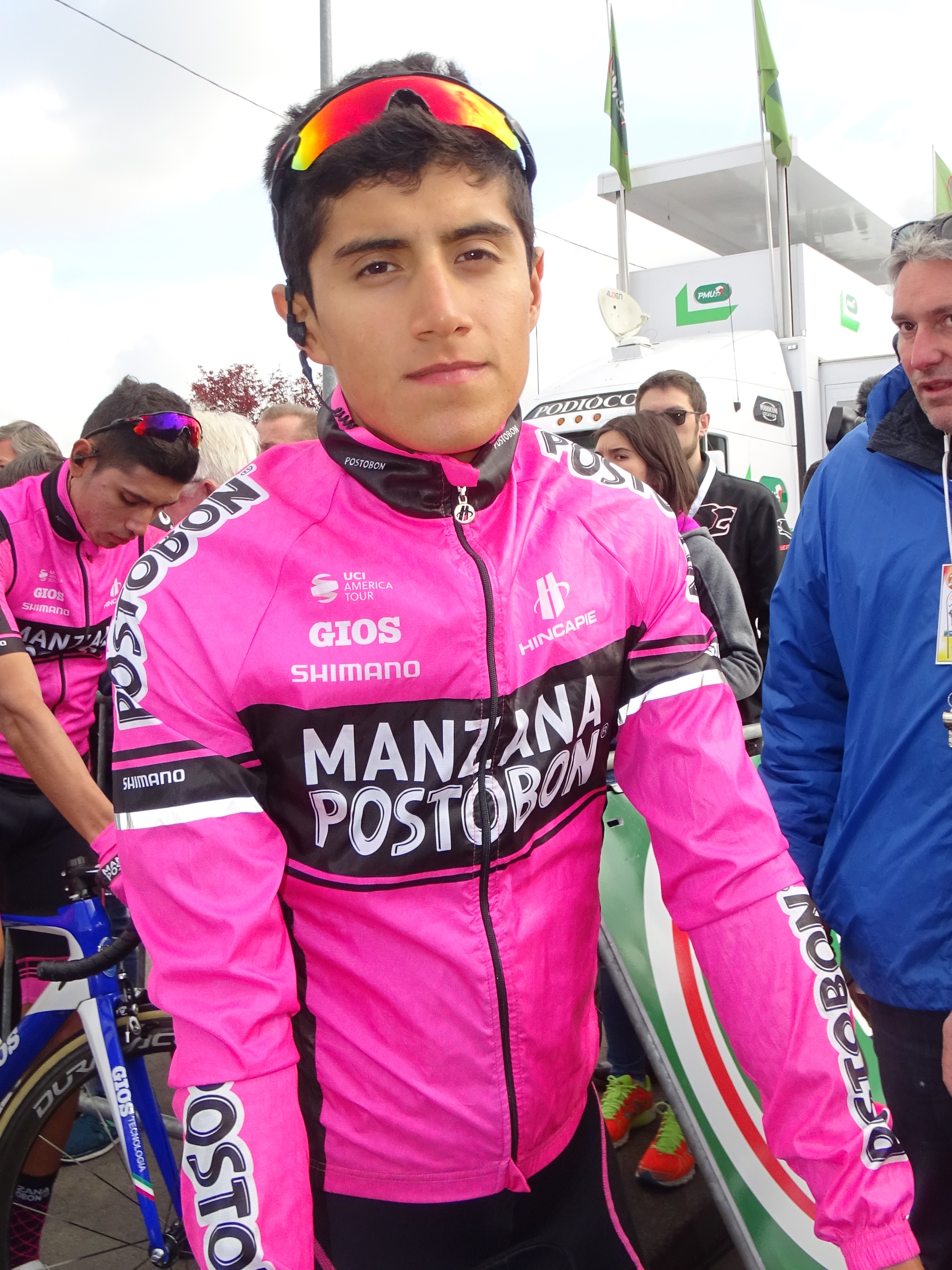
- García in 2017.

Personal information
- Full name: Jhojan Orlando García Sosa
- Born: 10 January 1998 (age 28) Bogotá, Colombia
- Height: 1.68 m (5 ft 6 in)
- Weight: 55 kg (121 lb)

Cycling career
- Sport: Cycling
- Discipline: Road
- Role: Rider
- Rider type: Climber

Professional teams
- 2017–2019: Team Manzana Postobón
- 2019: Medellín
- 2020–2023: Caja Rural–Seguros RGA

Jhojan Orlando García Sosa (born 10 January 1998) is a Colombian cyclist, who last rode for UCI ProTeam Caja Rural–Seguros RGA. In October 2020, he was named in the startlist for the 2020 Vuelta a España.

== Major results ==
2016
1st Overall Junior Vuelta a Colombia
2019
1st Young rider classification Vuelta a la Comunidad de Madrid
National Under–23 Road Championships

2nd Road race
2nd Time trial

8th Overall Tour de l'Avenir
10th Overall Vuelta a Asturias
2021
4th Overall Tour de Hongrie
4th Overall Presidential Tour of Turkey

=== Grand Tour general classification results timeline ===
Grand Tour	2020
Giro d'Italia	—
Tour de France	—
Vuelta a España	71

Legend
—	Did not compete
DNF	Did not finish
