= Bolivian Cycling Federation =

National governing body of cycle racing in Bolivia

The Bolivian Cycling Federation (in Spanish: Federación Boliviana de Ciclismo) is the national governing body of cycle racing in Bolivia.

It is a member of the UCI and COPACI.
