= Josh Edmondson (cyclist) =

British racing cyclist

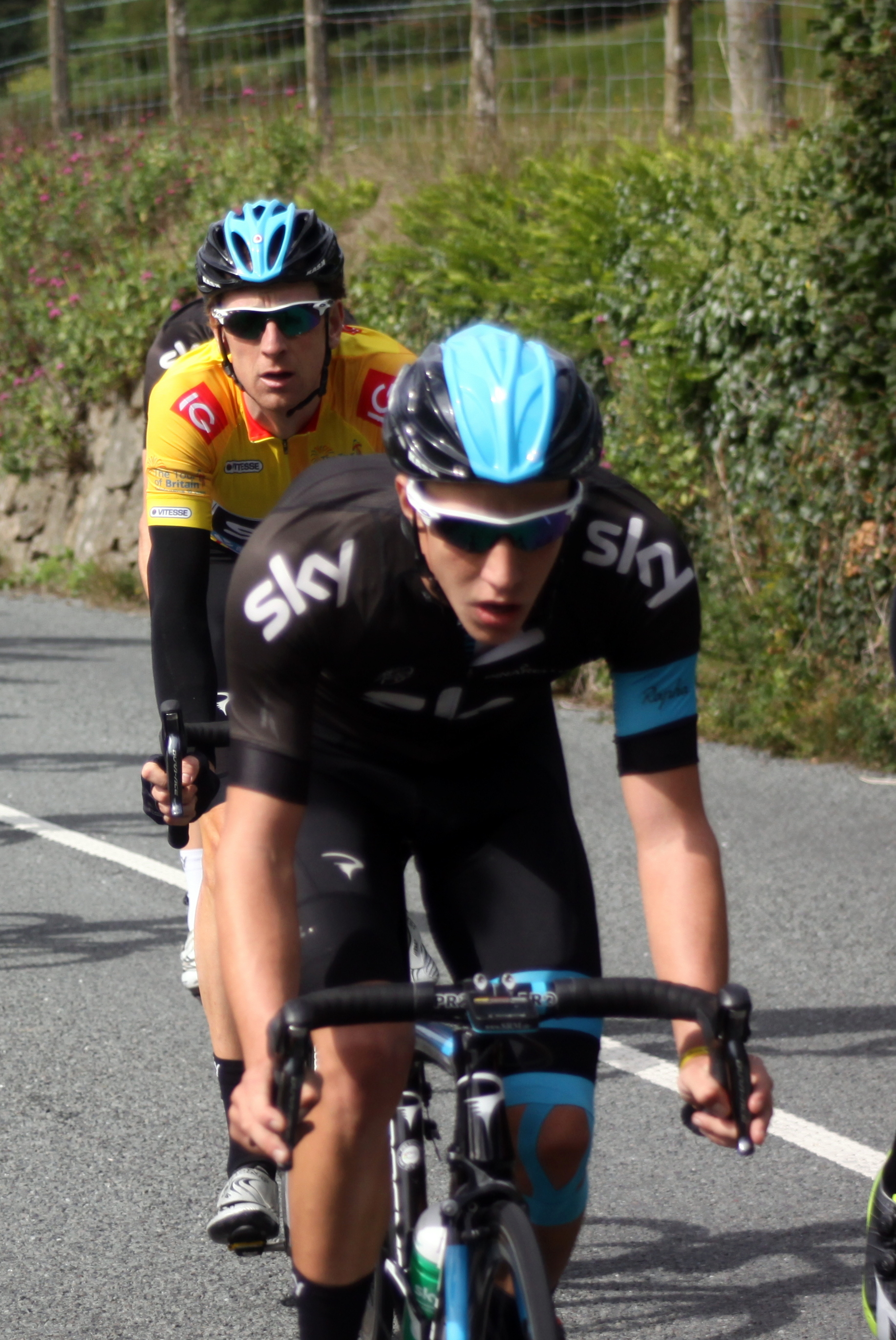
- Edmondson (front) at the 2013 Tour of Britain

Personal information
- Full name: Joshua Thomas Edmondson
- Born: 6 July 1992 (age 34) Leeds, United Kingdom
- Height: 1.81 m (5 ft 11 1/2 in)
- Weight: 63 kg (139 lb)

Cycling career
- Sport: Cycling
- Discipline: Road
- Role: Rider
- Rider type: Climber

Amateur teams
- 2010: Motorpoint–Marshalls Pasta
- 2011–2012: Team Colpack
- 2020: Crimson Orientation Marketing RT

Professional teams
- 2013–2014: Team Sky
- 2015: An Post–Chain Reaction
- 2016: NFTO

Joshua Thomas Edmondson (born 6 July 1992) is a British road racing cyclist, who most recently rode for British amateur team Crimson Orientation Marketing RT. Earlier in his career, Edmondson rode for UCI World Tour squad Team Sky in 2013 and 2014.

== Career ==
He earned his Sky contract by impressing in the 2012 Tour of Britain going on the attack in the race's queen stage. He is a climber and was seen as a possible future prospect in Grand Tours. After two seasons with Sky his contract was not renewed at the end of 2014. In March 2015 he announced that we would join An Post–Chain Reaction for the remainder of the 2015 season.

== Major results ==
2009
1st Stage 1 Grand Prix Rüebliland
3rd Overall Junior Tour of Wales
2010
1st Overall Isle of Man Youth Tour

1st Stage 2

3rd Overall Junior Tour of Wales

1st Mountains classification

4th Road race, UCI Juniors Road World Championships
2012
3rd Road race, National Under-23 Road Championships
10th Overall Giro della Valle d'Aosta
2013
9th Japan Cup
2014
5th Road race, National Road Championships
2015
1st Overall Ronde de l'Oise

1st Mountains classification
1st Stage 4

2nd Overall Rás Tailteann
6th Overall Tour d'Azerbaïdjan

1st Stage 3
