= Dominican Republic Cycling Federation =

National governing body of cycle racing in the Dominican Republic

Federación Dominicana de Ciclismo
- Sport: Cycle racing
- Abbreviation: FEDOCI
- Affiliation: UCI
- Regional affiliation: COPACI
- Headquarters: Santo Domingo
- President: Dr. José Bautista
- Secretary: Rafael Tejada

Official website
- [ www.ciclismo.com.do/Inicio/tabid/37/Default.aspx%20ciclismo.com.do]]
- (Dominican Republic)

The Dominican Republic Cycling Federation (in Spanish: Federación Dominicana de Ciclismo) is the national governing body of cycle racing in the Dominican Republic.

It is a member of the UCI and COPACI.

It covers the disciplines of road racing, track cycling, cyclo-cross, BMX, mountain biking and cycle speedway.

== See also ==
- Vuelta a la Independencia Nacional
