= Trinidad and Tobago Cycling Federation =

- Sport: Cycling
- Jurisdiction: Trinidad and Tobago
- Abbreviation: TTCF
- Founded: 1950

The Trinidad and Tobago Cycling Federation is the national governing body of cycling racing in Trinidad and Tobago. It was founded by Ferdi de Gannes and Compton Gonzalves in 1950.

It is a member of Union Cycliste Internationale and Confederación Panamericana de Ciclismo.

== See also ==
- Arima Velodrome
- Tobago Cycling Classic
- Trinidad and Tobago records in track cycling
