= Regional Committee for Cycling in Martinique =

The Regional Committee for Cycling in Martinique (in French: Comité Régional Cycliste de Martinique) is the regional governing body of cycle racing in Martinique.

It is an associated member of COPACI, the Pan-American cycling confederation.
