= Honduran National Cycling Federation =

National governing body of cycle racing in Honduras

The Honduran National Cycling Federation (in Spanish: Federación Nacional de Ciclismo de Honduras) is the national governing body of cycle racing in Honduras.

It is a member of the UCI and COPACI.
