= Confederación Panamericana de Ciclismo =

Cycle racing organisation

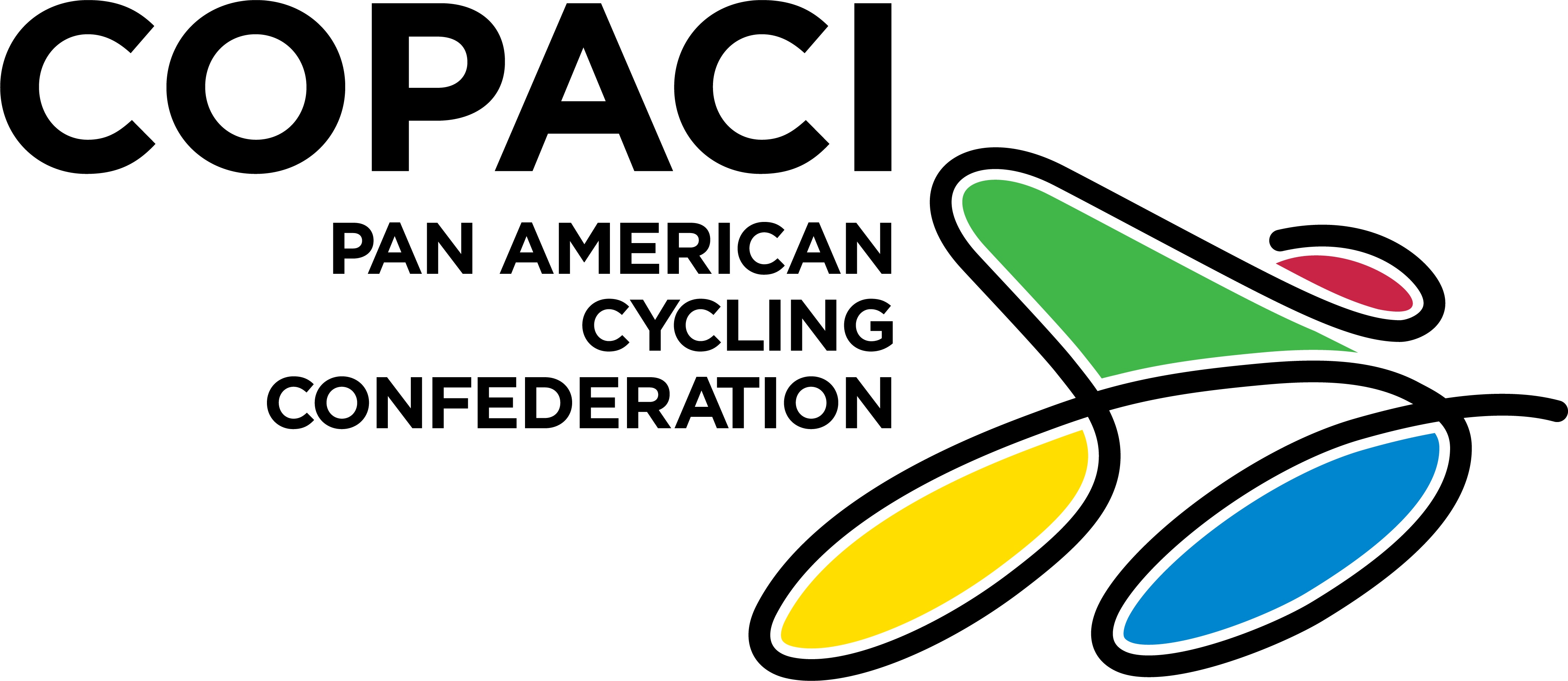
COPACI logo

The national federations of the UCI form confederations by continent. In the Americas, this body is the Confederación Panamericana de Ciclismo (the Pan American Cycling Confederation), also shortened to COPACI. COPACI was founded in 1922 in Montevideo, Uruguay, and is presently headquartered in Havana, Cuba.

COPACI serves as the sponsor of the annual Pan American Road and Track Championships and a key organisation for the UCI America Tour.

== Member Federations ==
As of June 2021, COPACI consists of 44 full member federations and 5 associate member federations. In 2025, the Mexican Cycling Federation was excluded and replaced by the Unión Ciclista de México.

=== Full members ===
Country	Federation
Anguilla	Anguilla Amateur Cycling Association
Antigua and Barbuda	Antigua and Barbuda Cycling Federation
Argentina	Argentine Cycling Union (Unión Ciclista de la Republica Argentina)
Aruba	Aruba Wieler Bond
Bahamas	Bahamas Cycling Federation
Barbados	Barbados Cycling Union
Belize	Cycling Federation of Belize
Bermuda	Bermuda Bicycle Association
Bolivia	Bolivian Cycling Federation (Federación Boliviana de Ciclismo)
Brazil	Brazilian Cycling Confederation (Confederação Brasileira de Ciclismo)
British Virgin Islands	British Virgin Islands Cycling Federation
Canada	Cycling Canada
Cayman Islands	Cayman Islands Cycling Association
Chile	Chilean Cycling Federation (Federación Deportiva Nacional de Ciclismo de Chile)
Colombia	Colombian Cycling Federation (Federación Colombiana de Ciclismo)
Costa Rica	Costa Rican Cycling Federation (Federación Costarricense de Ciclismo)
Cuba	Cuban Cycling Federation (Federación Cubana de Ciclismo)
Curaçao	Curaçao Cycling Federation (Curaçaose Wielerbond)
Dominica	Dominica Cycling Association
Dominican Republic	Dominican Republic Cycling Federation (Federación Dominicana de Ciclismo)
Ecuador	Ecuadorian Cycling Federation (Federación Ecuatoriana de Ciclismo)
El Salvador	El Salvador Cycling Federation (Federación Salvadoreña de Ciclismo)
Grenada	Grenada Cycling Federation
Guatemala	Guatemala Cycling Federation (Federación Guatemalteca de Ciclismo)
Guyana	Guyana Cycling Federation
Haiti	Haiti Cycling Federation (Fédération Haïtienne de Cyclisme)
Honduras	Honduran National Cycling Federation (Federación Nacional de Ciclismo de Honduras)
Jamaica	Jamaica Cycling Federation
Mexico	Unión Ciclista de México
Nicaragua	Nicaraguan Cycling Federation (Federación Nicaragüense de Ciclismo)
Panama	Panamanian Cycling Federation (Federación Panameña de Ciclismo)
Paraguay	Paraguayan Cycling Federation (Federación Paraguaya de Ciclismo)
Peru	Peruvian Cycling Federation (Federación Deportiva Peruana de Ciclismo)
Puerto Rico	Puerto Rican Cycling Federation (Federación de Ciclismo de Puerto Rico)
Saint Kitts and Nevis	Saint Kitts and Nevis Cycling Federation
Saint Lucia	St Lucia Cycling Association
Saint Vincent and the Grenadines	St Vincent and Grenadines Cycling Union
Sint Maarten	Sint Maarten Cycling Federation
Suriname	Suriname Cycling Union (Surinaamse Wielren Unie)
Trinidad and Tobago	Trinidad and Tobago Cycling Federation
United States	USA Cycling
United States Virgin Islands	Virgin Islands Cycling Federation
Uruguay	Uruguayan Cycling Federation (Federación Ciclista Uruguaya)
Venezuela	Venezuelan Cycling Federation (Federación Venezolana de Ciclismo)

=== Associate members ===
Country	Federation
Guadeloupe	Regional Cycling Committee of Guadeloupe (Comité Régional Cyclisme de la Guadeloupe)
French Guiana	Regional Cycling Committee of French Guiana (Comité Régional de Cyclisme de la Guyane)
Martinique	Regional Committee for Cycling in Martinique (Comité Régional Cycliste de Martinique)
Saint Martin	Regional Cycling Committee of Saint-Martin
Turks and Caicos Islands	Turcs and Caicos Cycling Federation

=== Former members ===
Following the dissolution of the Netherlands Antilles in 2010, its cycling federation was also disbanded and replaced with those of the three Caribbean member countries of the Kingdom of the Netherlands (Aruba, Curaçao, and Sint Maarten).

Country	Federation
Netherlands Antilles	Dutch Antillean Cycling Federation (Nederlands-Antilliaanse Wielerbond)
