= List of Trinidad and Tobago records in track cycling =

The following are the national records in track cycling in Trinidad and Tobago maintained by the Trinidad and Tobago Cycling Federation.

== Men ==
Key to tables: Awaiting ratification Record not kept by Trinidad and Tobago Cycling Federation Not ratified or later rescinded by the Trinidad and Tobago Cycling Federation

Event	Record	Athlete	Date	Meet	Place	Ref
Flying 200m time trial	9.100	Nicholas Paul	6 September 2019	Pan American Championships	Cochabamba, Bolivia	
250m time trial (flying start)	13.407	Varun Maharajh	5 December 2013	World Cup	Aguascalientes, Mexico	
250 m time trial (standing start)	17.303	Keron Bramble	4 September 2019	Pan American Championships	Cochabamba, Bolivia	
1km time trial	59.241	Nicholas Paul	8 September 2019	Pan American Championships	Cochabamba, Bolivia	
1 km time trial (sea level)	59.729	Nicholas Paul	6 April 2025	Pan American Championships	Asunción, Paraguay	
Team sprint	41.938	Keron Bramble; Njisane Phillip; Nicholas Paul	4 September 2019	Pan American Championships	Cochabamba, Bolivia	
4000m individual pursuit	4:21.726	Jadian Neaves	20 February 2026	Pan American Championships	Santiago, Chile	
4000 m team pursuit	4:09.157	Akil Campbell; Jadian Neaves; Liam Trepte; Tariq Woods	18 February 2026	Pan American Championships	Santiago, Chile	

== Women ==
Event	Record	Athlete	Date	Meet	Place	Ref
Flying 200m time trial	10.784	Makaira Wallace	15 March 2025	UCI Nations Cup	Konya, Turkey	
250m time trial (flying start)	14.996	Kollyn St. George	April 2015	Pan American Junior Championships	Aguascalientes, Mexico	
250 m time trial (standing start)	21.083	Makaira Wallace	5 April 2025	Pan American Championships	Asunción, Paraguay	
500m time trial	35.058	Kollyn St. George	April 2015	Pan American Junior Championships	Aguascalientes, Mexico	
1 km time trial	1:10.304	Makaira Wallace	5 April 2025	Pan American Championships	Asunción, Paraguay	
Team sprint	34.714	Kollyn St. George; Keiana Lester	April 2015	Pan American Junior Championships	Aguascalientes, Mexico	
3000m individual pursuit	3:36.731	Teniel Campbell	25 July 2018	CAC Games	Cali, Colombia	
4000m team pursuit	4:51.022	Alexandra Bovell; Alexi Costa; Jessica Costa; Christiane Farah	22 July 2018	CAC Games	Cali, Colombia	
