= Carolina Hidalgo Herrera =

Costa Rican lawyer and politician (born 1982)

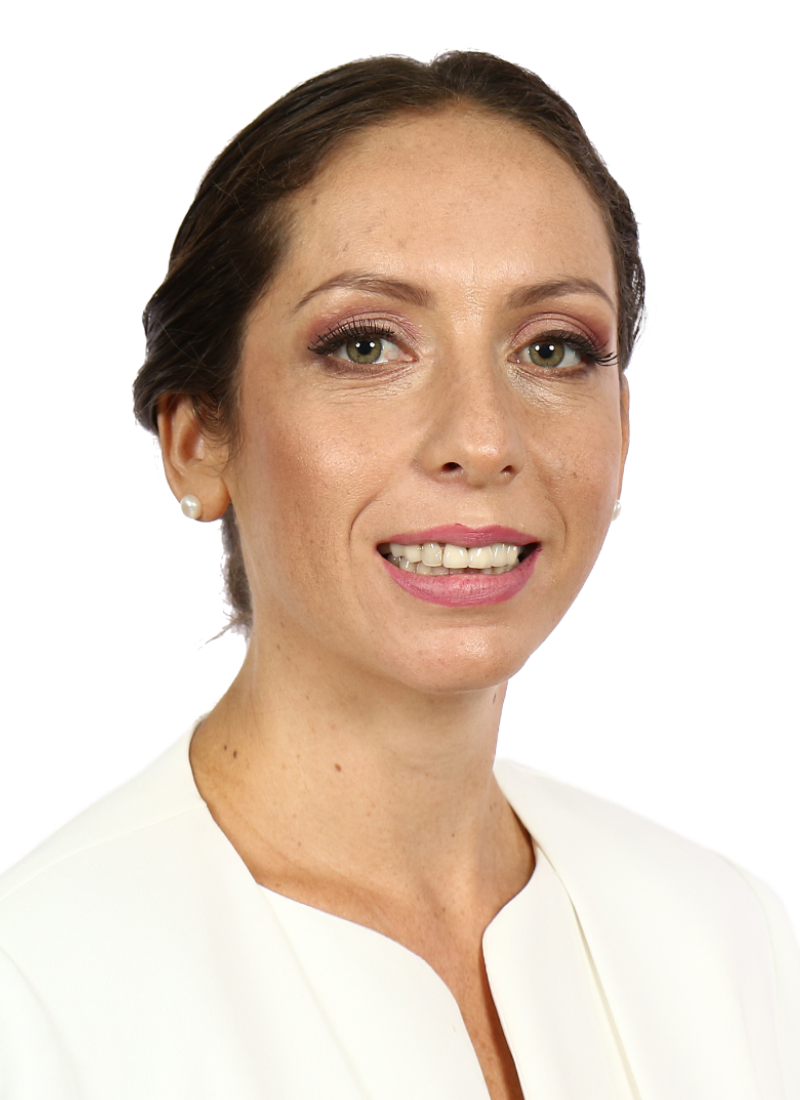
- Official portrait, 2018

56th President of the Legislative Assembly of Costa Rica
- In office 1 May 2018 – 30 April 2019
- Preceded by: Gonzalo Ramírez Zamora
- Succeeded by: Carlos Benavides Jiménez

Deputy of the Legislative Assembly of Costa Rica
- In office 1 May 2018 – 30 April 2022
- Preceded by: Nidia Jiménez Vásquez
- Succeeded by: María Daniela Rojas Salas
- Constituency: Alajuela (6th Office)

Personal details
- Born: 15 October 1982 (age 43) San José, Costa Rica
- Party: PAC
- Education: University of Costa Rica (LLB); University of Seville (MS)

Carolina Hidalgo Herrera (born 15 October 1982) is a Costa Rican lawyer and politician who served as the 56th President of the Legislative Assembly from 2018 to 2019. A member of the Citizens' Action Party, she previously served as Director of Alternative Dispute Resolution at the Ministry of Justice and Peace between 2014 and 2017.

== Political career ==
She was a candidate in the 2021 Citizens' Action Party presidential primary, but came in second place with 46.2% of the vote.

== See also ==
- List of presidents of the Legislative Assembly of Costa Rica
