= Puerto Rican Cycling Federation =

Governing body of cycle racing in Puerto Rico

- Sport: Bicycle racing
- Jurisdiction: National
- Abbreviation: PRCF
- Affiliation: UCI
- Regional affiliation: COPACI
- (Puerto Rico)

The Puerto Rican Cycling Federation (in Spanish: Federación de Ciclismo de Puerto Rico) is the national governing body of cycle racing in

is a member of the UCI and COPACI.

== Puerto Rican Cyclists ==
Stats.

Name	Age	Hometown	UCI World Rating	Top Results
Elvis Reyes	27 January 1995 (23)	-	1131	2x National Championships Puerto Rico - Road Race ('18, '17); National Championships Puerto Rico - ITT ('18)
Gian Martinez	Example	-	1449	2x 2nd National Championships Puerto Rico - Road Race ('18, '17) 4th National Championships Puerto Rico - Road Race ('16)
Bryan Leon	Example	Example	1675	3rd National Championships Puerto Rico - Road Race ('18) 4th National Championships Puerto Rico - Road Race ('17)
Luis Molina	Example	Example	1878	4th National Championships Puerto Rico - Road Race ('18)
Joseph Marrero	Example	Example	2119	5th National Championships Puerto Rico - Road Race ('18)
Brian Babilonia	16 September 1994 (age 23)	Mayagüez	2440	3rd National Championships Puerto Rico - Road Race ('15) 6th National Championships Puerto Rico - Road Race ('18)
Xavier Santana	1 March 1994 (24)	Example	2809	3rd stage National Championships Puerto Rico - ITT ('18)
Carlos Luciano De La Torre	Example	Example	NR	
John Louis Martinez Figueroa	Example	Example	NR	2nd stage National Championships Puerto Rico - ITT ('18)
Luis Rivera	Example	Example	NR	
Carlos Torres	Example	Example	NR	
Victor Cartagena De Jesus	Example	Example	NR	
