= Oleksandr Surutkovych =

Ukrainian cyclist

Personal information
- Full name: Oleksandr Surutkovych; Ukrainian: Олександр Суруткович
- Born: 8 January 1984 (age 42): Odesa, Ukrainian SSR, Soviet Union; (now Ukraine)

Cycling career
- Sport: Cycling
- Current team: Retired
- Discipline: Road
- Role: Rider

Amateur teams
- 2006–2008: Aran World–Cantina Tollo–BLS
- 2008: Team Type 1 (stagiaire)

Professional teams
- 2012: Team Specialized Concept Store
- 2013–2016: Synergy Baku
- 2016: Qinghai Tianyoude Cycling Team

Oleksandr Surutkovytch (Ukrainian: Олександр Суруткович; born 8 January 1984 in Odesa) is a Ukrainian-Azerbaijani former professional road cyclist.

== Major results ==
2005
2nd Overall Tour of Romania
2006
1st Time trial, Ukrainian National Under-23 Road Championships
2010
Kerman Tour

1st Stages 3 & 4

7th Overall Tour of Romania
8th Overall Tour du Maroc
8th Emirates Cup
2011
7th Overall Tour of Alanya
10th Overall Tour of Gallipoli
2012
Azerbaijani National Road Race Championships

1st Road race
2nd Time trial

2013
2nd Overall Tour d'Azerbaïdjan
2015
1st Mountains classification Tour d'Azerbaïdjan
2016
2nd Belgrade–Banja Luka I
3rd Belgrade–Banja Luka II
8th Horizon Park Classic
8th Grand Prix of Vinnytsia
