= Peruvian Cycling Federation =

National governing body of cycle racing in Peru

- Sport: Cycling
- Affiliation: UCI; COPACI
- Location: Peru
- (Peru)

The Peruvian Cycling Federation (in Spanish: Federación Deportiva Peruana de Ciclismo) is the national governing body of cycle racing in Peru.

It is a member of the UCI and COPACI.
