= Nicaraguan Cycling Federation =

National governing body of cycle racing in Nicaragua

The Nicaraguan Cycling Federation (in Spanish: Federación Nicaragüense de Ciclismo) is the national governing body of cycle racing in Nicaragua.

It is a member of the UCI and COPACI.
