= Jamaica Cycling Federation =

National governing body of cycle racing in Jamaica

The Jamaica Cycling Federation is the national governing body of cycle racing in Jamaica.

It is a member of the UCI and COPACI.
