= Paraguayan Cycling Federation =

National governing body of cycle racing in Paraguay

The Paraguayan Cycling Federation (in Spanish: Federación Paraguaya de Ciclismo) is the national governing body of cycle racing in Paraguay.

It is a member of the UCI and COPACI.
