= Costa Rican Cycling Federation =

National governing body of cycle racing in Costa Rica

The Costa Rican Cycling Federation or FECOCI (in Spanish: Federación Costarricense de Ciclismo) is the national governing body of cycle racing in Costa Rica. Hernán Solano was elected President of the federation in 2011 and again in 2013.

The FECOCI is a member of the UCI and COPACI.
