= Hernán Solano =

Costa Rican politician

Hernán Solano Venegas
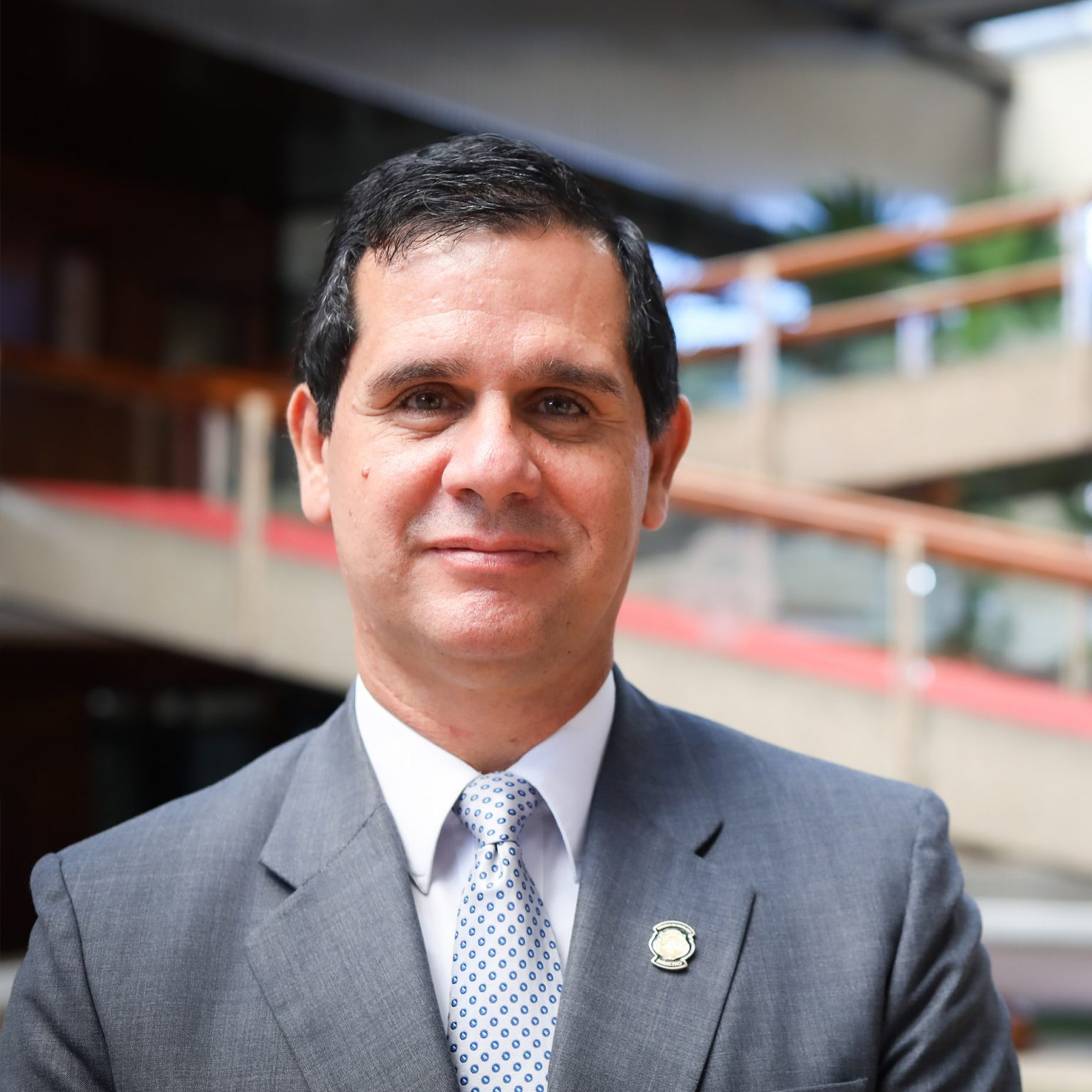

Minister of Sport
- In office 2014–2018
- President: Carlos Alvarado, (2018-2022)

Vice Minister of Youth
- In office 2002–2006
- President: Abel Pacheco, (2002-2006)

Personal details
- Born: 1967 (age 58–59) Pérez Zeledón
- Citizenship: Costa Rica
- Party: Citizens' Action Party
- Other political affiliations: Formerly Social Christian Unity Party
- Occupation: Civil Servant, President FECOCI

Hernán Solano Venegas (born 1967) is a Costa Rican politician and the first Vice-Minister of Youth and current Minister of Sport. In addition, Solano was the president of the Costa Rican Cycling Federation (FECOCI for its Spanish initials). He is from Pérez Zeledón.

== Early career ==
Solano was born in 1967 in Pérez Zeledón. In 1996, after moving to San José, Solano was recruited by Víctor Morales to run for President of Juventud Nacional, a branch of the Social Christian Unity Party (PUSC for its Spanish initials).

Between 1998 and 2002, Solano was director of the Movimiento Nacional de Juventudes (National Youth Movement) and he played a crucial role in the passage of the General Law for Young People.

Solano graduated from the Universidad Interamericana in 2003.

== Vice Minister of Youth ==
Solano was the first Vice Minister of Youth, serving under Guido Sáenz. Solano was named by Abel Pacheco (2002-2006) and initially served without a physical office or a budget. Among his chief concerns were unemployment and lack of education.

== Joining PAC ==
Between 2006 and 2007, Solano wrote a column for La Prensa Libre (The Free Press, Costa Rica), titled "Visión Joven" (Young Vision). In it, Solano extolled the values of sporting culture. In 2007, when the Central American Free Trade Agreement was up for referendum, Solano took a strong stand against it.

In 2007, Solano defected from PUSC, citing problems with PUSC and the National Liberation Party, the other ruling party. Solano claimed that members of both parties had "a lack of shame and a loss of ethical values from the traditional politicians."

In 2011, Solano was elected President of FECOCI. He was reelected in 2013.

Solano was selected Minister of Sport during PAC's second government.
