= Kazakhstan Cycling Federation =

Sport governing body

- Sport: Cycle racing
- Abbreviation: KCF
- Founded: 1992
- Affiliation: UCI
- Headquarters: Astana, Kazakhstan
- President: Raimbek Batalov

Official website
- cycling.kz
- (Kazakhstan)

The Kazakhstan Cycling Federation (Kazakh: Қазақстан велоспорт федерациясы, Qazaqstan velosport federatsııasy; Russian: Федерация велоспорта Казахстана) or KCF, is the national governing body of cycle racing in Kazakhstan. The KCF is steadfast in its support of the Astana Pro Team as a part of its global strategy to promote cycling in Kazakhstan.

It is a member of the UCI and the Asian Cycling Confederation.
