= Ivar Slik =

Dutch cyclist (born 1993)

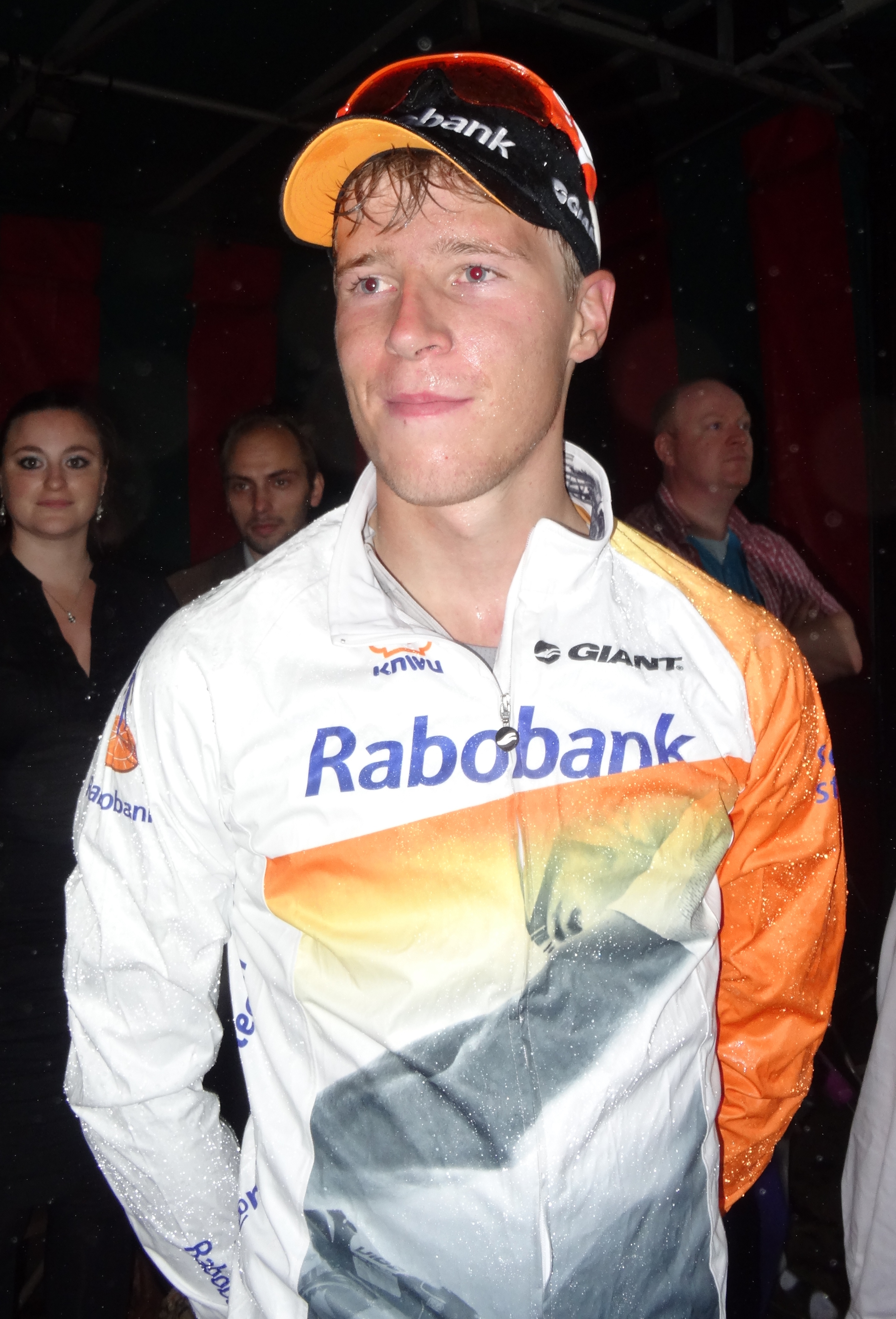
- Slik in 2014

Personal information
- Full name: Ivar Slik
- Born: 27 May 1993 (age 33) Utrecht, Netherlands
- Height: 187 cm (6 ft 2 in)
- Weight: 71 kg (157 lb)

Cycling career
- Sport: Cycling
- Discipline: Road
- Role: Rider
- Rider type: Breakaway specialist

Amateur team
- 2009: Merida–Combee

Professional teams
- 2012–2014: Rabobank Continental Team
- 2013: Belkin Pro Cycling (stagiaire)
- 2015–2016: Team Roompot
- 2017–2021: Monkey Town Continental Team

Ivar Slik (born 27 May 1993) is a Dutch racing cyclist, who last rode for UCI Continental team Abloc CT. He rode at the 2014 UCI Road World Championships. He is the brother of racing cyclist Rozanne Slik.

== Major results ==
2011
2nd Time trial, National Junior Road Championships
3rd Overall Trofeo Karlsberg
2012
1st Ronde van Midden-Nederland
1st Prologue Istrian Spring Trophy
2nd Overall Le Triptyque des Monts et Châteaux

1st Young rider classification

5th Overall Tour of China I
7th Zellik–Galmaarden
2014
2nd Antwerpse Havenpijl
7th Arnhem–Veenendaal Classic
2018
1st Stage 3 Tour of Fuzhou
8th Slag om Norg
2019
1st Mountains classification Paris–Arras Tour
1st Prologue Sibiu Cycling Tour
1st Stage 1 Tour of Romania
1st Stage 3 Tour of Fuzhou
3rd Slag om Norg
7th Midden–Brabant Poort Omloop
8th PWZ Zuidenveld Tour
10th Skive–Løbet
2021
1st Sprints classification Presidential Tour of Turkey
2022
1st Unbound Gravel 200
