= Azerion / Villa Valkenburg =

Dutch cycling team

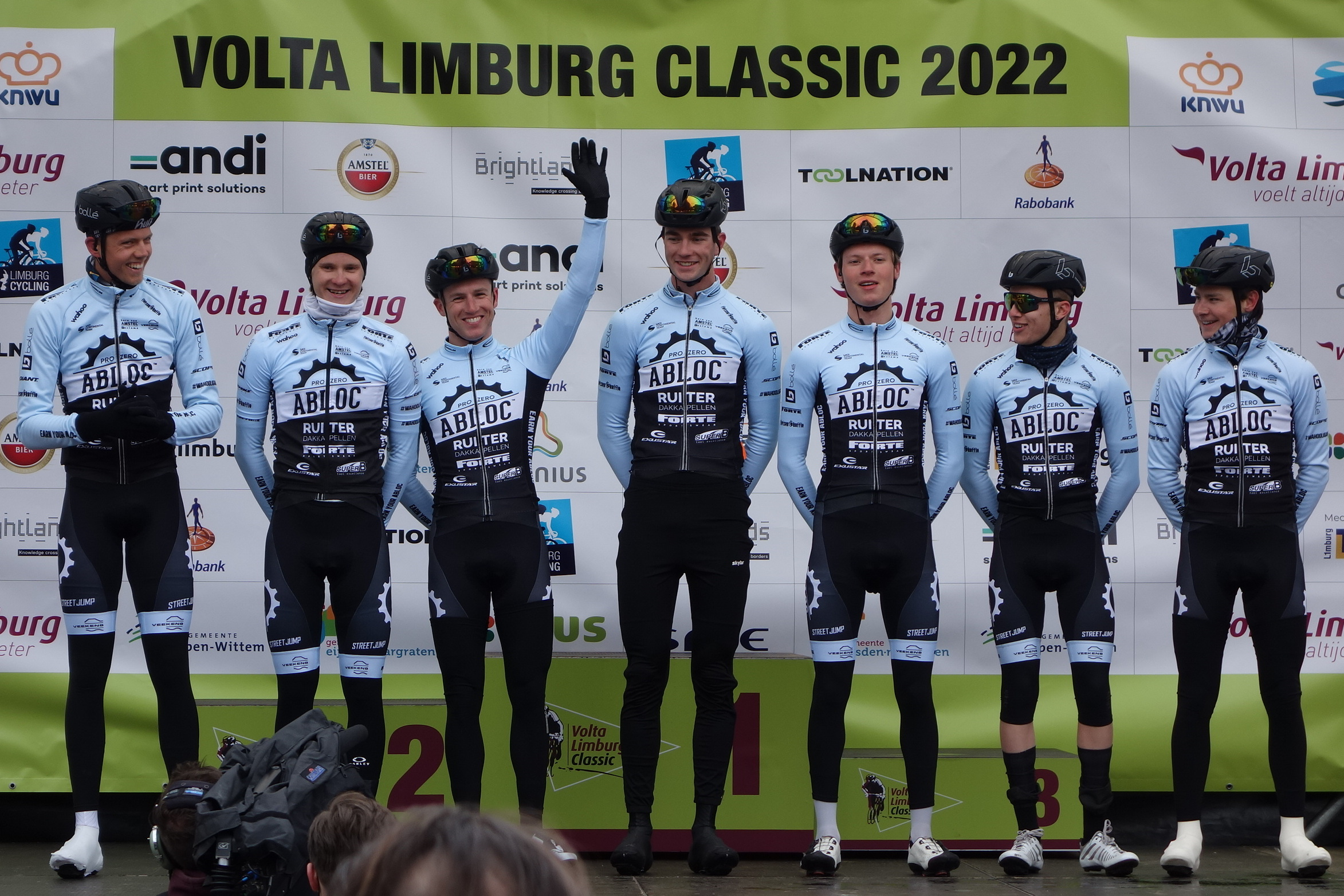
- 2022 VLC Men Start Team A Bloc

Team information
- UCI code: PVC (2014–2016); MCT (2017–2018); MTA (2019); ABC (2020–2023); PHV (2024); AVV (2026–)
- Founded: 2014
- Discipline: Road
- Status: UCI Continental
- Bicycles: Ridley
- Website: Team home page

Key personnel
- General manager: Paul Tabak
- Team managers: Johan Berghmans; Chris de Jonge; Remco te Brake

Team name history
- 2014–2016 2017–2018 2019 2020 2021–2023 2024–2025 2026–: Parkhotel Valkenburg CT; Monkey Town Continental Team; Monkey Town–à Bloc' à Bloc CT; Abloc CT; Parkhotel Valkenburg CT; Azerion / Villa Valkenburg

Azerion / Villa Valkenburg is a Dutch UCI Continental cycling team founded in 2014. After 3 years of Parkhotel Valkenburg as the name-sponsor, the men's team switched to Monkey Town as their name-sponsor, while the women's team continued under the old name. In 2019, the men's team switched to the name Monkey Town - à Bloc and a year later the team became ABLOC CT. In 2024 the team again returned to being named Parkhotel Valkenburg.

== Team history ==
=== 2014 ===
The team started under the name Parkhotel Valkenburg CT in 2014. At the Dutch National Road Race Championships team was very prominent in chasing down the breakaway but the team was no match for the break who made itto the line. Best placed finisher was Jasper Ockeloen in 56th. The Team's best result for the 2014 season was third overall at the Tour de Taiwan with Marco Zanotti. The team achieved no victories this season.

=== 2022 ===
ABLOC Continental Team, Streetjump Development Team, and Wielerclub North-Holland got together to build a new development team for junior riders: the Streetjump-ABLOC Development Team. Juniors that reach the semi-pro level when they enter the Under 23 category, can join the ABLOC team, while the others may enter the regional North-Holland team.

=== 2024 ===
The ABLOC cycling team will be renamed to Parkhotel Valkenburg. Both ABLOC and Parkhotel Valkenburg are owned by businessman Jos van de Mortel. The Parkhotel Valkenburg women's team will be taken over by the VolkerWessels Cycling Team.

== Doping ==
During the 2017 Tour of Qinghai Lake, Antonio Santoro tested positive for Acetazolamide and was banned for six months.

== Team roster ==
As of 11 February 2023.

Rider	Date of birth
Stijn Appel (NED)	14 November 1996 (age 29)
Bodi Del Grosso (NED)	14 March 2001 (age 25)
Maxime Duba (NED)	2 October 2004 (age 21)
Philip Heijnen (NED)	25 May 2000 (age 26)
Luuk Herben (NED)	10 September 2000 (age 25)
Jelle Johannink (NED)	22 October 1996 (age 29)
Antti-Jussi Juntunen (FIN)	6 April 1999 (age 27)
Lars Loohuis (NED)	4 October 2000 (age 25)
Callum Macleod (GBR)	8 March 2000 (age 26)
Mārtiņš Pluto (LAT)	13 January 1998 (age 28)

Rider	Date of birth
Jesper Rasch (NED)	22 March 1998 (age 28)
Martijn Rasenberg (NED)	9 November 2001 (age 24)
Mike Schuch (NED)	27 December 2002 (age 23)
Nils Sinschek (NED)	24 June 1998 (age 28)
Frank van den Broek (NED)	28 December 2000 (age 25)
Jan-Willem van Schip (NED)	20 August 1994 (age 32)
Otto van Zanden (NED)	27 October 2004 (age 21)
Luke Verburg (NED)	12 May 2001 (age 25)
Meindert Weulink (NED)	15 May 1999 (age 27)

== Major wins ==
2014
Stage 3b Sibiu Cycling Tour, Marco Zanotti
2015
Himmerland Rundt, Wim Stroetinga
Olympia's Tour

Stages 1b, 3 & 5b, Wim Stroetinga
Stage 5a (ITT), Dion Beukeboom
Stage 6, Joris Blokker

De Kustpijl, Marco Zanotti
Stage 5 Tour of Taihu Lake, Marco Zanotti
2016
Stage 3 Tour de Taiwan, Peter Schulting
Stage 3 Tour of Iran (Azerbaijan), Derk Abel Beckeringh
Prologue Okolo Slovenska, Dennis Bakker
Stage 5 Ster ZLM Toer, Wim Stroetinga
Stage 3 Kreiz Breizh Elites, Peter Schulting
2017
Stage 8 Tour of Hainan, Marco Zanotti
2018
Stage 2 Tour of Antalya, Wim Kleiman
Himmerland Rundt, André Looij
Grote Prijs Jean-Pierre Monseré, André Looij
Turul Romaniei

Stages 1 & 4 , Peter Schulting
Stage 3, Jeen de Jong

Tacx Pro Classic, Peter Schulting
Stage 3 Tour of Fuzhou, Ivar Slik
2019
Stage 2 Tour of Antalya, Bas van der Kooij
Stage 2 Oberösterreich Rundfahrt, Alex Molenaar
Prologue Sibiu Cycling Tour, Ivar Slik
Stage 8 Tour of Qinghai Lake, Alex Molenaar
Overall Tour of Romania, Alex Molenaar

Stage 1 , Ivar Slik

De Kustpijl, Bas van der Kooij
Stage 3 Tour of Fuzhou, Ivar Slik
2020
Netherlands National Road Race Championships, Stijn Daemen
2021

No recorded victories

2022
Wim Hendriks Trofee, Tomáš Kopecký
Midden–Brabant Poort Omloop, Mārtiņš Pluto
Stage 4 Dookoła Mazowsza, Jesper Rasch
Puchar MON, Jesper Rasch
2023
Stage 3 Tour of Poyang Lake, Jesper Rasch
Stage 5 Tour of Poyang Lake, Stijn Appel

== National and continental champions ==
2014
Dutch National Beach Race Championships, Jasper Ockeloen
2016
UEC European Beach Race Championships, Jasper Ockeloen
Dutch National Mountain Bike Championships Marathon, Jasper Ockeloen
2017
UEC European Beach Race Championships, Jasper Ockeloen
2018
Dutch National Beach Race Championships, Jasper Ockeloen
Latvian National Road Race Championships U23, Martin Pluto
2019
UEC European Beach Race Championships, Ivar Slik
2020
Dutch National Beach Race Championships, Ivar Slik
Dutch National Road Race Championships U23, Stijn Daemen
