= Hellenic Cycling Federation =

National governing body of cycle racing in Greece

The Hellenic Cycling Federation or HCF (Greek: Ελληνική Ομοσπονδία Ποδηλασίας or EOP) is the national governing body of cycle racing in Greece.

The first governing body for cycling Greece, the Greek Cycling Federation (POE) was formed in 1937. It merged into the Hellenic Association of Amateur Athletics after the Second World War. Later, cycling was once again moved to a dedicated organisation, the Hellenic Cycling Federation.

The Federation is based in Athens at the National Velodrome. It is a member of the UCI, the UEC, and the Hellenic Olympic Committee (HOC).

Mountain biking was recognised by the EOP in 1996, when it became an Olympic sport. Cyclocross The first national cyclocross championship was held in 2020.
