= Marco Zanotti (cyclist, born 1988) =

Italian cyclist

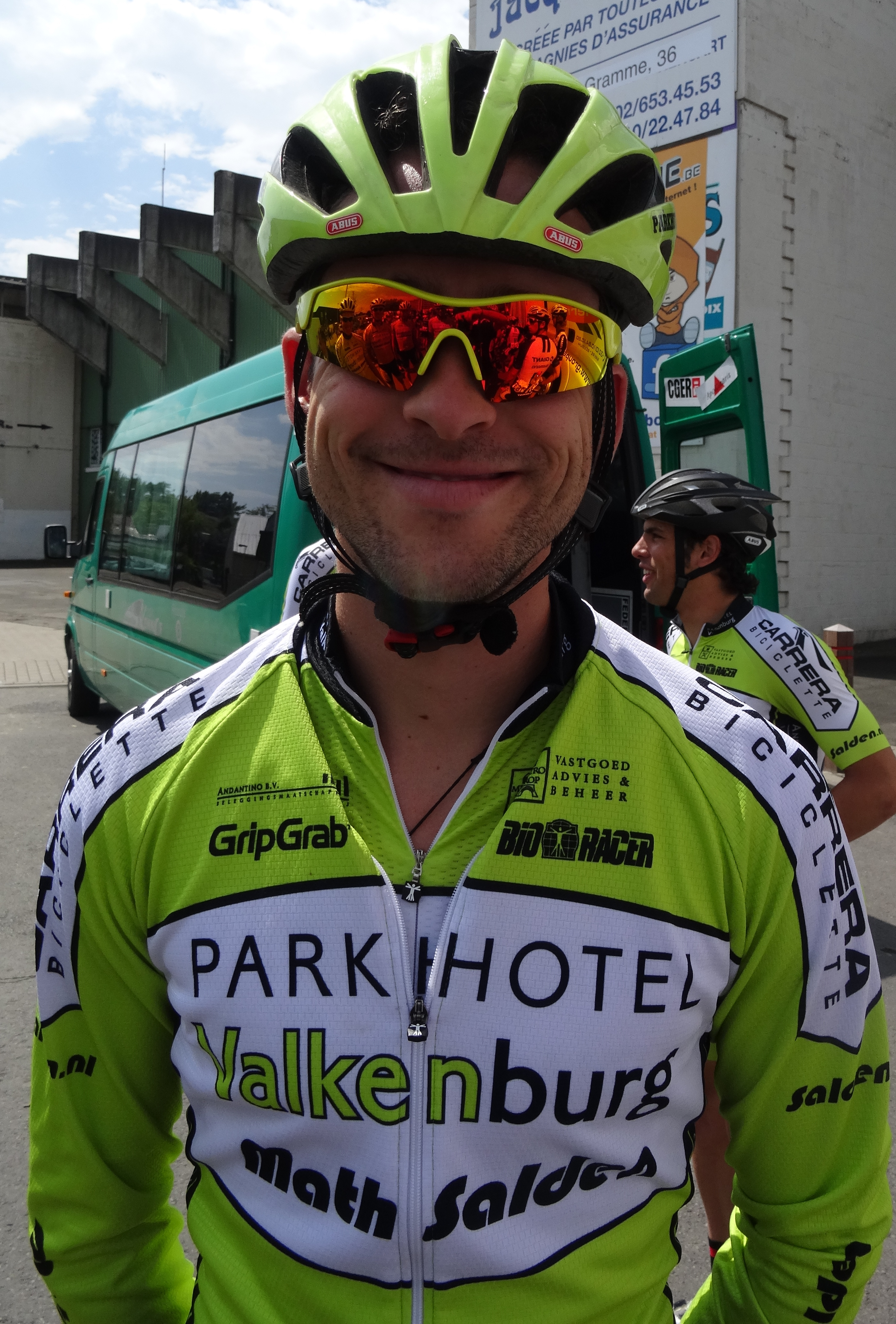
- Zanotti in 2014

Personal information
- Full name: Marco Zanotti
- Born: 10 September 1988 (age 38)

Cycling career
- Sport: Cycling
- Discipline: Road
- Role: Rider

Professional teams
- 2012–2013: Utensilnord–Named
- 2014–2018: Parkhotel Valkenburg Continental Team

Marco Zanotti (born 10 September 1988) is an Italian cyclist, who most recently rode for UCI Continental team Monkey Town Continental Team.

== Major results ==
2010
9th GP Sakia El Hamra, Les Challenges de la Marche Verte
2011
Giro Ciclistico d'Italia

1st Stages 3 & 9

2nd Ronde van Midden-Nederland
2012
Vuelta a Colombia

1st Stages 2 & 7

2013
7th Grand Prix Südkärnten
2014
1st Stage 3b Cycling Tour of Sibiu
3rd Overall Tour de Taiwan

1st Points classification

5th Overall Tour of China I
5th Zuid Oost Drenthe Classic I
5th Ronde van Zeeland Seaports
2015
1st De Kustpijl
2nd Ronde van Overijssel
3rd Overall Tour of Taihu Lake

1st Stage 5

4th Ronde van Noord-Holland
2016
6th Overall Tour du Loir-et-Cher

1st Points classification

7th De Kustpijl
2017
4th Overall Tour of Hainan

1st Stage 8

5th Circuit de Wallonie
9th Overall Tour de Taiwan
9th Himmerland Rundt
