= 2014 UCI Oceania Tour =

- Tenth edition of the UCI Oceania Tour

Details
- Dates: 29 January 2014–22 February 2014
- Location: Oceania
- Races: 4

The 2014 UCI Oceania Tour was the tenth season of the UCI Oceania Tour. The season began on 29 January 2014 with the New Zealand Cycle Classic and ended on 22 February 2014 with the Oceania Cycling Championships.

The points leader, based on the cumulative results of previous races, wears the UCI Oceania Tour cycling jersey. Damien Howson from Australia was the defending 2013 UCI Oceania Tour champion.

Throughout the season, points are awarded to the top finishers of stages within stage races and the final general classification standings of each of the stages races and one-day events. The quality and complexity of a race also determines how many points are awarded to the top finishers, the higher the UCI rating of a race, the more points are awarded. The UCI ratings from highest to lowest are as follows:

- Multi-day events: 2.HC, 2.1 and 2.2
- One-day events: 1.HC, 1.1 and 1.2

== Events ==
Date	Race Name	Location	UCI Rating	Winner	Team
29 January-2 February	New Zealand Cycle Classic	New Zealand	2.2	Michael Vink (NZL)	Team Budget Forklifts
5–9 February	Herald Sun Tour	Australia	2.1	Simon Clarke (AUS)	Orica–GreenEDGE
21 February	Oceania Cycling Championships – Time Trial	Australia	CC	Joseph Cooper (NZL)	New Zealand (national team)
23 February	Oceania Cycling Championships – Road Race	Australia	CC	Luke Durbridge (AUS)	Australia (national team)

== Final standings ==
=== Individual classification ===
Rank	Name	Points
1.	Robert Power (AUS)	70
2.	Michael Vink (NZL)	66
3.	Brenton Jones (AUS)	45
4.	Bernard Sulzberger (AUS)	40
5.	James Oram (NZL)	38
6.	Jack Haig (AUS)	38
7.	Robert-Jon McCarthy (AUS)	36
8.	Neil Van Der Ploeg (AUS)	34
9.	William Clarke (AUS)	26
10.	Tommy Nankervis (AUS)	25

=== Team classification ===
Rank	Team	Points
1.	Avanti Racing Team	174
2.	Drapac Professional Cycling	156
3.	Team Budget Forklifts	118
4.	An Post–Chain Reaction	44
5.	Rapha Condor–JLT	40
6.	Bissell Development Team	38
7.	Madison-Genesis	26
8.	OCBC Singapore Continental Cycling Team	17
9.	Synergy Baku Cycling Project	9
10.	UnitedHealthcare	5

=== Nation classification ===
Rank	Nation	Points
1.	Australia	1101
2.	New Zealand	474
