= 2016 Herald Sun Tour =

UCI Oceania Tour

Race details
- Dates: February 3, 2016–February 7, 2016
- Stages: 5
- Distance: 540.1 km (335.6 mi)
- Winning time: 12h 53' 00"

Results
Jersey awarded to the overall winner	Winner	Chris Froome (GBR)	(Team Sky)
	Second	Peter Kennaugh (GBR)	(Team Sky)
	Third	Damien Howson (AUS)	(Orica–GreenEDGE)
Jersey awarded to the mountains classification winner	Mountains	Chris Froome (GBR)	(Team Sky)
Jersey awarded to the young rider classification winner	Young rider	Chris Hamilton (AUS)	(Australia)
Jersey awarded to the sprints classification winner	Sprints	Benjamin Hill (AUS)	(Attaque Team Gusto)
	Team	Team Sky	

The 2016 Herald Sun Tour was a road cycling stage race that took place in Victoria, Australia, between 3 and 7 February 2016. The race was rated as a 2.1 event as part of the 2016 UCI Oceania Tour.

The race included five stages: the first was a prologue individual time trial; the remaining four stages were road stages, including a summit finish at Arthurs Seat on the final day.

The champion of the 2015 Herald Sun Tour, Cameron Meyer, did not take part, as his new team Team Dimension Data was not invited to the race.

Will Clarke (Drapac Professional Cycling) won the prologue for the second consecutive year and was the first rider to lead the race. He lost the lead on the second stage, when the Team Sky riders Chris Froome and Peter Kennaugh broke away to cross the line 17 seconds ahead of the field; Kennaugh won the stage and took the lead. The following two stages ended in sprints (won by Orica–GreenEDGE's Caleb Ewan and UnitedHealthcare's John Murphy respectively), during which Kennaugh increased his lead. On the final stage, Froome attacked on the penultimate ascent of Arthurs Seat, then attacked again on the final climb to win the stage and take the overall victory. Kennaugh was second, 29 seconds behind, with Damien Howson (Orica–GreenEDGE) third, more than a minute behind Froome. Froome also won the mountains classification and Team Sky won the team classification. Chris Hamilton (Australia) was the best young rider, with Benjamin Hill (Attaque Team Gusto) taking the sprints classification.

== Teams ==
Sixteen teams were invited to take part in the race. These included three UCI WorldTeams, five UCI Professional Continental teams, seven UCI Continental teams and a national team.

UCI WorldTeams

- Team Sky
- Trek–Segafredo
- Orica–GreenEDGE

UCI Professional Continental teams

- Drapac Professional Cycling
- UnitedHealthcare
- Team Novo Nordisk
- ONE Pro Cycling
- Nippo–Vini Fantini

UCI Continental teams

- JLT–Condor
- Avanti IsoWhey Sports
- Kenyan Riders Downunder
- Data#3–Cisco Racing Team p/b Scody
- State of Matter MAAP Racing
- Attaque Team Gusto
- St. George NRS Cycling Team

National teams

- Australia

== Stages ==
Stage schedule
Stage	Date	Route	Distance	Type	Winner
P	3 February	Melbourne	2.1 km (1 mi)	Prologue	Will Clarke (AUS)
1	4 February	Healesville–Healesville	126 km (78 mi)	Hilly stage	Peter Kennaugh (GBR)
2	5 February	Yarra Glen–Moe	144 km (89 mi)	Hilly stage	Caleb Ewan (AUS)
3	6 February	Traralgon–Inverloch	146 km (91 mi)	Hilly stage	John Murphy (USA)
4	7 February	Arthurs Seat–Arthurs Seat	122 km (76 mi)	Hilly stage	Chris Froome (GBR)

=== Prologue ===
3 February 2015 – Melbourne, 2.1 km (1.3 mi)

Result of Prologue
Rank	Rider	Team	Time
1	Will Clarke (AUS)	Drapac Professional Cycling	2m 34"
2	Caleb Ewan (AUS)	Orica–GreenEDGE	+ 1"
3	Neil Van der Ploeg (AUS)	Avanti IsoWhey Sports	+ 2"
4	Robbie Hucker (AUS)	Avanti IsoWhey Sports	+ 3"
5	Joseph Cooper (NZL)	Avanti IsoWhey Sports	+ 4"
6	Sam Bewley (NZL)	Orica–GreenEDGE	+ 5"
7	Niccolò Bonifazio (ITA)	Trek–Segafredo	+ 5"
8	Damien Howson (AUS)	Orica–GreenEDGE	+ 5"
8	Peter Kennaugh (GBR)	Team Sky	+ 5"
10	Anthony Giacoppo (AUS)	Avanti IsoWhey Sports	+ 5"

=== Stage 1 ===
4 February 2015 – Healesville–Healesville, 126 km (78 mi)

Result of Stage 1
Rank	Rider	Team	Time
1	Peter Kennaugh (GBR)	Team Sky	3h 01' 47"
2	Chris Froome (GBR)	Team Sky	+ 0"
3	Dion Smith (NZL)	ONE Pro Cycling	+ 17"
4	Anthony Giacoppo (AUS)	Avanti IsoWhey Sports	+ 17"
5	Jack Haig (AUS)	Orica–GreenEDGE	+ 17"
6	Jack Bobridge (AUS)	Trek–Segafredo	+ 17"
7	Adam Phelan (AUS)	Drapac Professional Cycling	+ 17"
8	Alistair Donohoe (AUS)	Australia	+ 17"
9	Damiano Cunego (ITA)	Nippo–Vini Fantini	+ 17"
10	Christian Meier (CAN)	Orica–GreenEDGE	+ 17"

General classification after Stage 1
Rank	Rider	Team	Time
1	Peter Kennaugh (GBR)	Team Sky	3h 04' 16"
2	Chris Froome (GBR)	Team Sky	+ 7"
3	Dion Smith (NZL)	ONE Pro Cycling	+ 23"
4	Robbie Hucker (AUS)	Avanti IsoWhey Sports	+ 25"
5	Joseph Cooper (NZL)	Avanti IsoWhey Sports	+ 26"
6	Damien Howson (AUS)	Orica–GreenEDGE	+ 27"
7	Anthony Giacoppo (AUS)	Avanti IsoWhey Sports	+ 27"
8	Jack Bobridge (AUS)	Trek–Segafredo	+ 28"
9	Nathan Earle (AUS)	Drapac Professional Cycling	+ 28"
10	Chris Hamilton (AUS)	Australia	+ 28"

=== Stage 2 ===
5 February – Yarra Glen–Moe, 144 km (89 mi)

Result of Stage 2
Rank	Rider	Team	Time
1	Caleb Ewan (AUS)	Orica–GreenEDGE	3h 29' 06"
2	Tanner Putt (USA)	UnitedHealthcare	+ 0"
3	Peter Kennaugh (GBR)	Team Sky	+ 3"
4	Chris Froome (GBR)	Team Sky	+ 5"
5	Jack Bobridge (AUS)	Trek–Segafredo	+ 5"
6	Jack Haig (AUS)	Orica–GreenEDGE	+ 14"
7	Niccolò Bonifazio (ITA)	Trek–Segafredo	+ 25"
8	John Murphy (USA)	UnitedHealthcare	+ 25"
9	Patrick Shaw (AUS)	Avanti IsoWhey Sports	+ 25"
10	Fumiyuki Beppu (JPN)	Trek–Segafredo	+ 25"

General classification after Stage 2
Rank	Rider	Team	Time
1	Peter Kennaugh (GBR)	Team Sky	6h 33' 21"
2	Chris Froome (GBR)	Team Sky	+ 13"
3	Jack Bobridge (AUS)	Trek–Segafredo	+ 31"
4	Jack Haig (AUS)	Orica–GreenEDGE	+ 48"
5	Dion Smith (NZL)	ONE Pro Cycling	+ 52"
6	Damien Howson (AUS)	Orica–GreenEDGE	+ 53"
7	Anthony Giacoppo (AUS)	Avanti IsoWhey Sports	+ 54"
8	Robbie Hucker (AUS)	Avanti IsoWhey Sports	+ 54"
9	Patrick Shaw (AUS)	Avanti IsoWhey Sports	+ 55"
10	Joseph Cooper (NZL)	Avanti IsoWhey Sports	+ 55"

=== Stage 3 ===
6 February – Traralgon–Inverloch, 146 km (91 mi)

Result of Stage 3
Rank	Rider	Team	Time
1	John Murphy (USA)	UnitedHealthcare	3h 20' 52"
2	Niccolò Bonifazio (ITA)	Trek–Segafredo	+ 0"
3	Steele Von Hoff (AUS)	ONE Pro Cycling	+ 0"
4	Jesse Kerrison (AUS)	State of Matter MAAP Racing	+ 0"
5	Anthony Giacoppo (AUS)	Avanti IsoWhey Sports	+ 0"
6	Caleb Ewan (AUS)	Orica–GreenEDGE	+ 0"
7	Neil Van Der Ploeg (AUS)	Avanti IsoWhey Sports	+ 0"
8	Daniele Colli (ITA)	Nippo–Vini Fantini	+ 0"
9	Alistair Donohoe (AUS)	Australia	+ 0"
10	Luke Rowe (GBR)	Team Sky	+ 0"

General classification after Stage 3
Rank	Rider	Team	Time
1	Peter Kennaugh (GBR)	Team Sky	9h 54' 13"
2	Chris Froome (GBR)	Team Sky	+ 13"
3	Jack Bobridge (AUS)	Trek–Segafredo	+ 31"
4	Jack Haig (AUS)	Orica–GreenEDGE	+ 48"
5	Dion Smith (NZL)	ONE Pro Cycling	+ 52"
6	Damien Howson (AUS)	Orica–GreenEDGE	+ 53"
7	Anthony Giacoppo (AUS)	Avanti IsoWhey Sports	+ 54"
8	Robbie Hucker (AUS)	Avanti IsoWhey Sports	+ 54"
9	Patrick Shaw (AUS)	Avanti IsoWhey Sports	+ 55"
10	Joseph Cooper (NZL)	Avanti IsoWhey Sports	+ 55"

=== Stage 4 ===
7 February – Arthurs Seat–Arthurs Seat, 122 km (76 mi)

Result of Stage 4
Rank	Rider	Team	Time
1	Chris Froome (GBR)	Team Sky	2h 58' 44"
2	Damien Howson (AUS)	Orica–GreenEDGE	+ 17"
3	Jonathan Clarke (AUS)	UnitedHealthcare	+ 21"
4	Chris Hamilton (AUS)	Australia	+ 29"
5	Robbie Hucker (AUS)	Avanti IsoWhey Sports	+ 29"
6	Jack Haig (AUS)	Orica–GreenEDGE	+ 29"
7	Peter Kennaugh (GBR)	Team Sky	+ 32"
8	Jack Bobridge (AUS)	Trek–Segafredo	+ 36"
9	Anthony Giacoppo (AUS)	Avanti IsoWhey Sports	+ 41"
10	Dion Smith (NZL)	ONE Pro Cycling	+ 43"

General classification after Stage 4
Rank	Rider	Team	Time
1	Chris Froome (GBR)	Team Sky	12h 53' 00"
2	Peter Kennaugh (GBR)	Team Sky	+ 29"
3	Damien Howson (AUS)	Orica–GreenEDGE	+ 1' 01"
4	Jack Bobridge (AUS)	Trek–Segafredo	+ 1' 04"
5	Jack Haig (AUS)	Orica–GreenEDGE	+ 1' 14"
6	Jonathan Clarke (AUS)	UnitedHealthcare	+ 1' 15"
7	Robbie Hucker (AUS)	Avanti IsoWhey Sports	+ 1' 20"
8	Chris Hamilton (AUS)	Australia	+ 1' 23"
9	Anthony Giacoppo (AUS)	Avanti IsoWhey Sports	+ 1' 32"
10	Dion Smith (NZL)	ONE Pro Cycling	+ 1' 32"

== Classification leadership table ==
Stage	Winner	General classification	Sprint classification	Mountains classification	Young rider classification	Most competitive rider	Team classification
P	Will Clarke	Will Clarke	Will Clarke	N/A	Caleb Ewan	N/A	Avanti IsoWhey Sports
1	Peter Kennaugh	Peter Kennaugh	Peter Kennaugh	Chris Froome	Chris Hamilton	Nicholas Katsonis	Team Sky
2	Caleb Ewan	Peter Kennaugh	Peter Kennaugh	Chris Harper	Chris Hamilton	Chris Harper	Team Sky
3	John Murphy	Peter Kennaugh	Benjamin Hill	Chris Harper	Chris Hamilton	Benjamin Hill	Team Sky
4	Chris Froome	Chris Froome	Benjamin Hill	Chris Froome	Chris Hamilton	Fumiyuki Beppu	Team Sky
Final		Chris Froome	Benjamin Hill	Chris Froome	Chris Hamilton		Team Sky
