= 2014 UCI Road World Championships – Qualification =

This page is an overview of the qualification criteria for the 2014 UCI Road World Championships.

== Elite events ==
=== Elite men's road race ===
Qualification will be based on performances on the UCI run tours during 2014. Results from January to the middle of August would count towards the qualification criteria on both the 2014 UCI World Tour and the UCI Continental Circuits across the world, with the rankings being determined upon the release of the numerous tour rankings on 15 August 2014.

Tour	Ranking	Number of riders	Nations
UCI World Tour	Nations ranking	14 to enter, 9 to start	Spain; France; Italy; Netherlands; Colombia; Australia; Belgium; Poland; Germany; United Kingdom
UCI World Tour	Individual ranking	5 to enter, 3 to start	Belarus; Canada; Lithuania; Luxembourg; South Africa; Slovakia
UCI Africa Tour	Nations ranking	9 to enter, 6 to start	Morocco
UCI Africa Tour	Nations ranking	5 to enter, 3 to start	Eritrea; Algeria
UCI America Tour	Nations ranking	9 to enter, 6 to start	Venezuela; United States
UCI America Tour	Nations ranking	5 to enter, 3 to start	Brazil; Costa Rica; Argentina
UCI America Tour	Individual ranking	2 to enter, 1 to start	Ecuador
UCI Asia Tour	Nations ranking	9 to enter, 6 to start	Iran
UCI Asia Tour	Nations ranking	5 to enter, 3 to start	Kazakhstan; Japan; South Korea
UCI Europe Tour	Nations ranking	9 to enter, 6 to start	Ukraine; Russia; Slovenia; Denmark; Austria; Portugal
UCI Europe Tour	Nations ranking	5 to enter, 3 to start	Czech Republic; Switzerland; Norway; Ireland; Romania; Croatia; Estonia; Latvia
UCI Europe Tour	Individual ranking	2 to enter, 1 to start	Sweden; Serbia; Bulgaria; Greece
UCI Oceania Tour	Nations ranking	5 to enter, 3 to start	New Zealand

=== Elite women's road race ===
Qualification will be based mainly on the 2014 UCI Nation Ranking as of 15 August 2014. The first five nations in this classification qualified 7 riders to start, the next ten nations qualified 6 riders to start and the next 5 nations qualified 5 riders to start. Other nations and non ranked nations had the possibility to send 3 riders to start. Moreover, the outgoing World Champion and continental champions are qualified to take part in the race on top of the nation numbers.

Tour	Position	Number of riders	Qualified nations
2014 UCI World Rankings for nations	1–5	14 to enter, 7 to start	Netherlands; Italy; United States; Sweden; Germany
2014 UCI World Rankings for nations	6–15	13 to enter, 6 to start	United Kingdom; Russia; France; Belgium; Australia; Canada; Belarus; Brazil; New Zealand; Poland
2014 UCI World Rankings for nations	16–20	10 to enter, 5 to start	South Africa; Switzerland; Ukraine; Norway; Venezuela
2014 UCI World Rankings for nations	Other nations	6 to enter, 3 to start	
Champion	Name		
Outgoing World Champion	Marianne Vos (NED)		
African Champion	Ashleigh Moolman (RSA)		
Pan American Champion	Arlenis Sierra (CUB)		
Asian Champion	Mei Yu Hsiao (TAI)		
European Champion (under-23)	Sabrina Stultiens (NED)		
Oceanian Champion	Jessica Allen (AUS)		

=== Elite men's time trial ===
All National Federations may enter 4 riders of whom 2 may start. In addition to this number, the outgoing World Champion and the current continental champions may take part.

Champion	Name
Outgoing World Champion	Tony Martin (GER)
African Champion	Daniel Teklehaimanot (ERI)
Pan American Champion	Pedro Herrera (COL)
Asian Champion	Dmitriy Gruzdev (KAZ)
Oceanian Champion	Joseph Cooper (NZL)

=== Elite women's time trial ===
All National Federations may enter 4 riders of whom 2 may start. In addition to this number, the outgoing World Champion and the current continental champions may take part.

Champion	Name
Outgoing World Champion	Ellen van Dijk (NED)
African Champion	Ashleigh Moolman (RSA)
Pan American Champion	Evelyn Stevens (USA)
Asian Champion	Na Ah-reum (KOR)
European Champion (under-23)	Mieke Kröger (GER)
Oceanian Champion	Shara Gillow (AUS)

=== Men's team time trial ===
It is an obligation for all 2014 UCI ProTeams to participate. Besides of that invitations are sent to the 20 leading teams of the 2014 UCI Europe Tour, top 5 leading teams of the 2013–14 UCI America Tour and 2013–14 UCI Asia Tour and the leading teams of the 2013–14 UCI Africa Tour and 2014 UCI Oceania Tour on 15 August 2014. Teams that accept the invitation within the deadline have the right to participate. Every participating team may register nine riders from its team roster (excluding stagiaires) and has to select six riders to compete in the event.

Tour	Places	Team	Number of riders
UCI ProTeams (Obligated to start)	1–18 (all)	(France) Ag2r–La Mondiale	9 to enter, 6 to start
UCI ProTeams (Obligated to start)	1–18 (all)	(Kazakhstan) Astana	9 to enter, 6 to start
UCI ProTeams (Obligated to start)	1–18 (all)	(Netherlands) Belkin Pro Cycling	9 to enter, 6 to start
UCI ProTeams (Obligated to start)	1–18 (all)	(United States) BMC Racing Team	9 to enter, 6 to start
UCI ProTeams (Obligated to start)	1–18 (all)	(Italy) Cannondale	9 to enter, 6 to start
UCI ProTeams (Obligated to start)	1–18 (all)	(France) Team Europcar	9 to enter, 6 to start
UCI ProTeams (Obligated to start)	1–18 (all)	(France) FDJ.fr	9 to enter, 6 to start
UCI ProTeams (Obligated to start)	1–18 (all)	(Netherlands) Giant–Shimano	9 to enter, 6 to start
UCI ProTeams (Obligated to start)	1–18 (all)	(United States) Garmin–Sharp	9 to enter, 6 to start
UCI ProTeams (Obligated to start)	1–18 (all)	(Russia) Team Katusha	9 to enter, 6 to start
UCI ProTeams (Obligated to start)	1–18 (all)	(Italy) Lampre–Merida	9 to enter, 6 to start
UCI ProTeams (Obligated to start)	1–18 (all)	(Belgium) Lotto–Belisol	9 to enter, 6 to start
UCI ProTeams (Obligated to start)	1–18 (all)	(Spain) Movistar Team	9 to enter, 6 to start
UCI ProTeams (Obligated to start)	1–18 (all)	(Australia) Orica–GreenEDGE	9 to enter, 6 to start
UCI ProTeams (Obligated to start)	1–18 (all)	(Belgium) Omega Pharma–Quick-Step	9 to enter, 6 to start
UCI ProTeams (Obligated to start)	1–18 (all)	(United Kingdom) Team Sky	9 to enter, 6 to start
UCI ProTeams (Obligated to start)	1–18 (all)	(Russia) Tinkoff–Saxo	9 to enter, 6 to start
UCI ProTeams (Obligated to start)	1–18 (all)	(United States) Trek Factory Racing	9 to enter, 6 to start
Invited UCI European teams by 2014 UCI Europe Tour	1–20	(Belgium) Topsport Vlaanderen–Baloise	9 to enter, 6 to start
Invited UCI European teams by 2014 UCI Europe Tour	1–20	(Belgium) Wallonie-Bruxelles	9 to enter, 6 to start
Invited UCI European teams by 2014 UCI Europe Tour	1–20	(Belgium) Wanty–Groupe Gobert	9 to enter, 6 to start
Invited UCI European teams by 2014 UCI Europe Tour	1–20	(Denmark) Cult Energy–Vital Water	9 to enter, 6 to start
Invited UCI European teams by 2014 UCI Europe Tour	1–20	(France) Bretagne–Séché Environnement	9 to enter, 6 to start
Invited UCI European teams by 2014 UCI Europe Tour	1–20	(France) Cofidis	9 to enter, 6 to start
Invited UCI European teams by 2014 UCI Europe Tour	1–20	(France) Roubaix–Lille Métropole	9 to enter, 6 to start
Invited UCI European teams by 2014 UCI Europe Tour	1–20	(Germany) NetApp–Endura	9 to enter, 6 to start
Invited UCI European teams by 2014 UCI Europe Tour	1–20	(Germany) Team Stölting	9 to enter, 6 to start
Invited UCI European teams by 2014 UCI Europe Tour	1–20	(Italy) Bardiani–CSF	9 to enter, 6 to start
Invited UCI European teams by 2014 UCI Europe Tour	1–20	(Italy) MG Kvis–Wilier	9 to enter, 6 to start
Invited UCI European teams by 2014 UCI Europe Tour	1–20	(Italy) Neri Sottoli	9 to enter, 6 to start
Invited UCI European teams by 2014 UCI Europe Tour	1–20	(Netherlands) Rabobank Development Team	9 to enter, 6 to start
Invited UCI European teams by 2014 UCI Europe Tour	1–20	(Poland) BDC Marcpol	9 to enter, 6 to start
Invited UCI European teams by 2014 UCI Europe Tour	1–20	(Poland) CCC–Polsat–Polkowice	9 to enter, 6 to start
Invited UCI European teams by 2014 UCI Europe Tour	1–20	(Russia) RusVelo	9 to enter, 6 to start
Invited UCI European teams by 2014 UCI Europe Tour	1–20	(Slovenia) Adria Mobil	9 to enter, 6 to start
Invited UCI European teams by 2014 UCI Europe Tour	1–20	(Spain) Caja Rural–Seguros RGA	9 to enter, 6 to start
Invited UCI European teams by 2014 UCI Europe Tour	1–20	(Switzerland) IAM Cycling	9 to enter, 6 to start
Invited UCI European teams by 2014 UCI Europe Tour	1–20	(Ukraine) Kolss Cycling Team	9 to enter, 6 to start
Invited UCI Asian teams by 2013–14 UCI Asia Tour	1–5	(Iran) Tabriz Petrochemical Team	9 to enter, 6 to start
Invited UCI Asian teams by 2013–14 UCI Asia Tour	1–5	(Kazakhstan) Continental Team Astana	9 to enter, 6 to start
Invited UCI Asian teams by 2013–14 UCI Asia Tour	1–5	(Iran) Pishgaman Yazd	9 to enter, 6 to start
Invited UCI Asian teams by 2013–14 UCI Asia Tour	1–5	(Japan) Vini Fantini–Nippo	9 to enter, 6 to start
Invited UCI Asian teams by 2013–14 UCI Asia Tour	1–5	OCBC Singapore Continental Cycling Team	9 to enter, 6 to start
Invited UCI American teams by 2013–14 UCI America Tour	1–5	(United States) Team SmartStop	9 to enter, 6 to start
Invited UCI American teams by 2013–14 UCI America Tour	1–5	(Brazil) Funvic Brasilinvest–São José dos Campos	9 to enter, 6 to start
Invited UCI American teams by 2013–14 UCI America Tour	1–5	(United States) Optum–Kelly Benefit Strategies	9 to enter, 6 to start
Invited UCI American teams by 2013–14 UCI America Tour	1–5	(United States) Hincapie Sportswear Development Team	9 to enter, 6 to start
Invited UCI American teams by 2013–14 UCI America Tour	1–5	Team Ecuador	9 to enter, 6 to start
Invited UCI African teams by 2013–14 UCI Africa Tour	1	(South Africa) MTN–Qhubeka	9 to enter, 6 to start
Invited UCI Oceanian teams by 2014 UCI Oceania Tour	1	(Australia) Avanti Racing Team	9 to enter, 6 to start

=== Women's team time trial ===
Invitations are sent to the 25 leading UCI Women's Teams in the UCI Teams Ranking on 15 August 2014. Teams that accept the invitation within the deadline have the right to participate. Every participating team may register nine riders from its team roster (excluding stagiaires) and has to select six riders to compete in the event.

Tour	Position	Number of riders	Invited teams
2014 UCI World Rankings for teams	1–25	9 to enter, 6 to start	Rabo–Liv Women Cycling Team; Boels–Dolmans; Orica–AIS; Team Giant–Shimano; Specialized–lululemon; Wiggle–Honda; Hitec Products; RusVelo; Alé–Cipollini; Astana BePink; Estado de México–Faren Kuota; Lotto–Belisol Ladies; UnitedHealthcare Women's Team; Optum p/b Kelly Benefit Strategies; Servetto Footon; Bigla Cycling Team; BTC City Ljubljana; S.C. Michela Fanini Rox; TIBCO / To The Top; Futurumshop.nl–Zannata; Poitou–Charentes.Futuroscope.86; Lointek; Bizkaia–Durango; Topsport Vlaanderen–Pro-Duo; Top Girls Fassa Bortolo

== Under-23 events ==
=== Men's under-23 road race ===
Qualification is based on performances on the UCI run tours and the Men Under 23 Nations’ Cup during 2014. Results from January to the middle of August would count towards the qualification criteria. The first 5 nations of the final classification of the Men Under 23 Nations’ Cup are entitled to an extra rider. In addition to this number the current continental champions may take part. The outgoing World Champion is not allowed to start because she is not an under-23 rider anymore.

Tour	Position	Number of riders	Nations
Organizing nation	—N/a	10 to enter, 5 to start	Spain
UCI Africa Tour	1	10 to enter, 5 to start	Eritrea
UCI Africa Tour	2	8 to enter, 4 to start	South Africa
UCI Africa Tour	3-5	6 to enter, 3 to start	Morocco; Algeria; Rwanda
UCI America Tour	1-3	10 to enter, 5 to start	Colombia; Costa Rica; United States
UCI America Tour	4-6	8 to enter, 4 to start	Guatemala; Chile; Venezuela
UCI America Tour	7-10	6 to enter, 3 to start	Brazil; Mexico; Jamaica; Puerto Rico
UCI Asia Tour	1-2	10 to enter, 5 to start	Kazakhstan; Malaysia
UCI Asia Tour	3-4	8 to enter, 4 to start	Iran; Macau
UCI Asia Tour	5-7	6 to enter, 3 to start	Hong Kong; South Korea; India
UCI Europe Tour	1-15	10 to enter, 5 to start	Denmark; Netherlands; France; Italy; Belgium; Germany; United Kingdom; Norway; Russia; Austria; Switzerland; Romania; Turkey; Poland; Slovenia
UCI Europe Tour	16–20	8 to enter, 4 to start	Albania; Portugal; Slovakia; Georgia; Bosnia and Herzegovina
UCI Europe Tour	21–25 & 27	6 to enter, 3 to start	Latvia; Ireland; Azerbaijan; Moldova; Belarus; Serbia
UCI Oceania Tour	1	10 to enter, 5 to start	Australia
UCI Oceania Tour	2	6 to enter, 3 to start	New Zealand
Men Under 23 Nations’ Cup		6 to enter, 3 to start	TBD
Champion	Name		
Pan American Champion	Fernando Gaviria (COL)		
Asian Champion	Vadim Galeyev (KAZ)		
European Champion (under-23)	Stefan Küng (SUI)		
Oceanian Champion	Robert Power (AUS)		

=== Men's under-23 time trial ===
All National Federations may enter 4 riders of whom 2 may start. In addition to this number, the outgoing World Champion and the current continental champions may take part.

Champion	Name
Outgoing World Champion	Damien Howson (AUS)
African Champion	Willem Jakobus Smit (RSA)
Pan American Champion	Rodrigo Contreras (COL)
Asian Champion	Viktor Okishev (KAZ)
European Champion	Stefan Küng (SUI)
Oceanian Champion	Harry Carpenter (AUS)

== Junior events ==
=== Men's junior road race ===
Qualification will be based mainly on the final UCI Juniors Nations' Cup ranking as of 15 August 2014. The first ten nations in this classification qualified 6 riders to start, the next five nations qualified 5 riders to start and the next 5 nations qualified 4 riders to start. Spain, as the organizing nation, shall be entitled 5 riders to start. Other nations and non ranked nations had the possibility to send 3 riders to start. Moreover, continental champions are qualified to take part in the race on top of the nation numbers. The outgoing World Champion is not allowed to take part because he is not a junior rider anymore.

Tour	Position	Number of riders	Nations
UCI Juniors Nations' Cup ranking	1–10	12 to enter, 6 to start	France; Denmark; Belgium; Germany; United States; Russia; Italy; Norway; Slovenia; Netherlands
UCI Juniors Nations' Cup ranking	11–15	10 to enter, 5 to start	Switzerland; United Kingdom; Australia; Sweden; Ireland
UCI Juniors Nations' Cup ranking	16–20	8 to enter, 4 to start	Kazakhstan; Canada; Czech Republic; Japan; Slovakia
Organizing nation	—N/a	10 to enter, 5 to start	Spain
Other nations	—N/a	6 to enter, 3 to start	TBD
Champion	Name		
African Champion	Abderrahim Zahiri (MAR)		
Pan American Champion	Wilmar Paredes (COL)		
Asian Champion	Grigoriy Shtein (KAZ)		
European Champion (under-23)	Edoardo Affini (ITA)		
Oceanian Champion	Lucas Hamilton (AUS)		

=== Women's junior road race ===
All National Federations may enter 8 riders of whom 4 may start. In addition to this number the current continental champions may take part. The outgoing World Champion is not allowed to start because she is not a junior rider anymore.

Champion	Name
Outgoing World Champion	Amalie Dideriksen (DEN)
African Champion	Monique Gerber (RSA)
Pan American Champion	Karen Flores (MEX)
Asian Champion	Nadezhda Geneleva (KAZ)
European Champion	Sofia Bertizzolo (ITA)
Oceanian	Elizabeth Stannard (NZL)

=== Men's junior time trial ===
All National Federations may enter 4 riders of whom 2 may start. In addition to this number, the outgoing World Champion and the current continental champions may take part.

Champion	Name
Outgoing World Champion	Igor Decraene (BEL)
African Champion	Ivan Venter (RSA)
Pan American Champion	Jaime Testrepo (COL)
Asian Champion	Kim Ji-Hun (KOR)
European Champion	Lennard Kaemna (GER)
Oceanian Champion	Michael Strorer (AUS)

=== Women's junior time trial ===
All National Federations may enter 4 riders of whom 2 may start. In addition to this number the current continental champions may take part. The outgoing World Champion is not allowed to start because she is not a junior rider anymore.

Champion	Name
Pan American Champion	Camila Valbuena (COL)
Asian Champion	Yekaterina Yuraitis (KAZ)
European Champion	Aafke Soet (NED)
Oceanian Champion	Alexandra Manly (AUS)
