= 2015 UCI Oceania Tour =

Cycling competition

- Eleventh edition of the UCI Oceania Tour

Details
- Dates: 28 January 2015–28 February 2015
- Location: Oceania
- Races: 5

Champions
- Individual champion: Taylor Gunman (NZL) (Avanti Racing Team)
- Teams' champion: Avanti Racing Team
- Nations' champion: New Zealand

The 2015 UCI Oceania Tour was the eleventh season of the UCI Oceania Tour. The season began on 28 January 2015 with the New Zealand Cycle Classic and finished on 28 February 2015 with The REV Classic.

The points leader, based on the cumulative results of previous races, wears the UCI Oceania Tour cycling jersey. Robert Power from Australia is the defending 2014 UCI Oceania Tour champion.

Throughout the season, points are awarded to the top finishers of stages within stage races and the final general classification standings of each of the stages races and one-day events. The quality and complexity of a race also determines how many points are awarded to the top finishers, the higher the UCI rating of a race, the more points are awarded. The UCI ratings from highest to lowest are as follows:

- Multi-day events: 2.HC, 2.1 and 2.2
- One-day events: 1.HC, 1.1 and 1.2

== Events ==
Date	Race name	Location	UCI Rating	Winner	Team
28 January-1 February	New Zealand Cycle Classic	New Zealand	2.2	Taylor Gunman (NZL)	Avanti Racing Team
1 February	Cadel Evans Great Ocean Road Race	Australia	1.1	Gianni Meersman (BEL)	Etixx–Quick-Step
4–8 February	Herald Sun Tour	Australia	2.1	Cameron Meyer (AUS)	Orica–GreenEDGE
13 February	Oceania Cycling Championships – Time Trial	Australia	CC	Michael Hepburn (AUS)	Australia (national team)
15 February	Oceania Cycling Championships – Road Race	Australia	CC	Taylor Gunman (NZL)	New Zealand (national team)
28 February	The REV Classic	New Zealand	1.2	Patrick Bevin (NZL)	Avanti Racing Team

== Final ranking ==
Rank	Name	Team	Points
1.	Taylor Gunman (NZL)	Avanti Racing Team	152
2.	Patrick Bevin (NZL)	Avanti Racing Team	135
3.	Joseph Cooper (NZL)	Avanti Racing Team	100
4.	Jordan Kerby (AUS)	Drapac Professional Cycling	74
5.	Jason Christie (NZL)	Avanti Racing Team	72
6.	Thomas Davison (NZL)	Avanti Racing Team	46
7.	James Oram (NZL)	Axeon Cycling Team	46
8.	Daniel Berry (NZL)	Team Budget Forklifts	44
9.	Samuel Horgan (NZL)	Team Budget Forklifts	30
10.	Neil Van Der Ploeg (AUS)	Avanti Racing Team	29

Rank	Team	Points
1.	Avanti Racing Team	546
2.	Drapac Professional Cycling	155
3.	Team Budget Forklifts	142
4.	Axeon Cycling Team	46
5.	Data3-Symantec Racing Team p/b Scody	30

Rank	Nation	Points
1.	New Zealand	1175.4
2.	Australia	708.5
