= 2015 Orica–GreenEDGE season =

Orica–GreenEDGE
- 2015 season
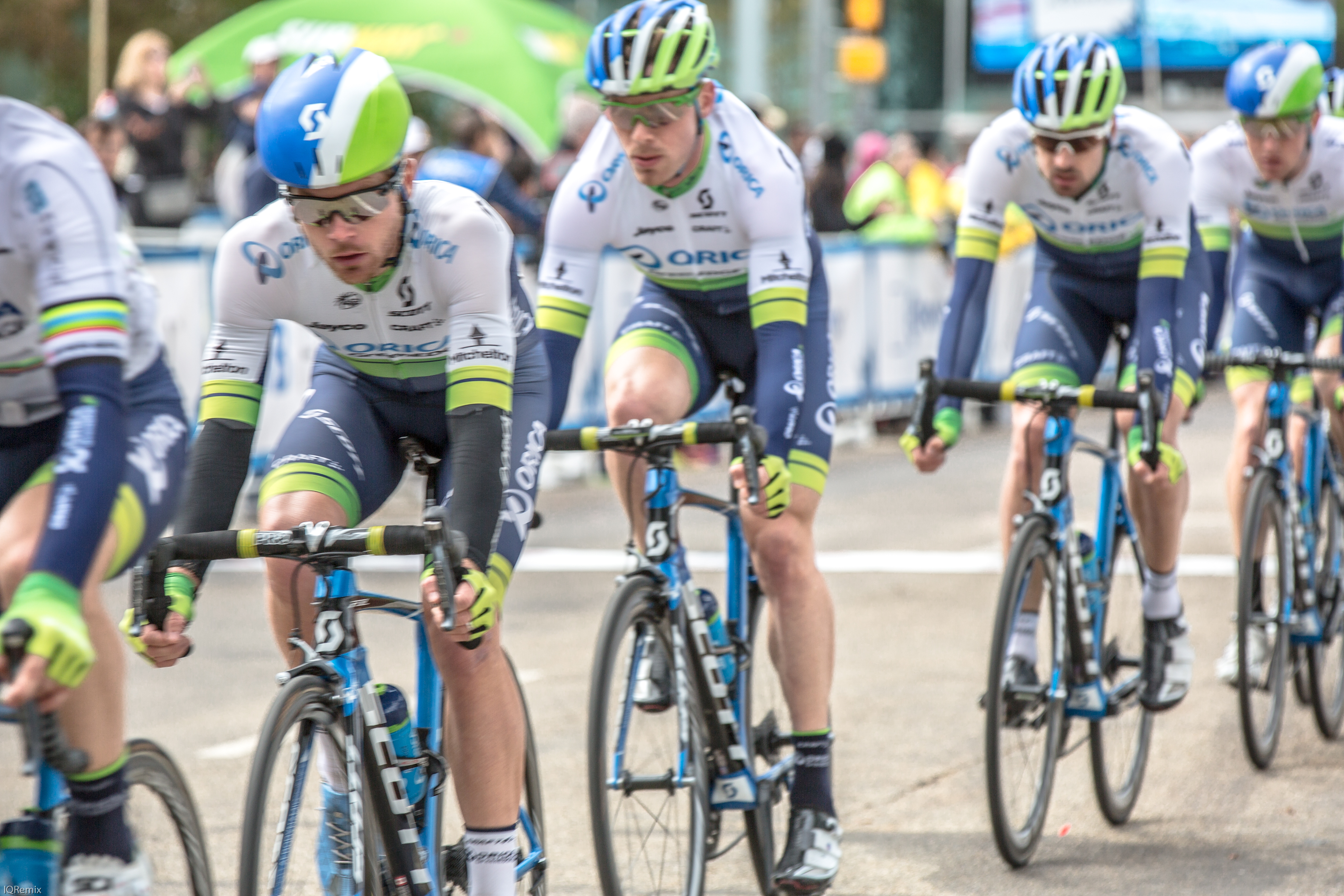
- Orica–GreenEDGE on 2015 Tour of Alberta
- UCI code: OGE
- Status: UCI ProTeam
- Manager: Shayne Bannan
- Main sponsor(s): Orica
- Based: Australia
- Bicycles: Scott
- Groupset: Shimano

Season victories
- One-day races: 2
- Stage race overall: 3
- Stage race stages: 21
- National Championships: 1

The 2015 season for the Orica–GreenEDGE cycling team began in January at the Tour Down Under. As a UCI WorldTeam, they were automatically invited and obligated to send a squad to every event in the UCI World Tour.

== Team roster ==
As of 1 January 2015

Rider	Date of birth
Michael Albasini (SUI)	20 December 1980 (aged 34)
Sam Bewley (NZL)	22 July 1987 (aged 27)
Adam Blythe (GBR)	1 October 1989 (aged 25)
Esteban Chaves (COL)	17 January 1990 (aged 24)
Simon Clarke (AUS)	18 July 1986 (aged 28)
Magnus Cort (DEN)	16 January 1993 (aged 21)
Mitchell Docker (AUS)	2 October 1986 (aged 28)
Luke Durbridge (AUS)	9 April 1991 (aged 23)
Caleb Ewan (AUS)	11 July 1994 (aged 20)
Simon Gerrans (AUS)	16 May 1980 (aged 34)
Jack Haig (Note: Haig joined the team as a stagiaire on August 1.) (AUS)	6 September 1993 (aged 21)
Mathew Hayman (AUS)	20 April 1978 (aged 36)
Michael Hepburn (AUS)	17 August 1991 (aged 23)
Leigh Howard (AUS)	18 October 1989 (aged 25)

Rider	Date of birth
Damien Howson (AUS)	13 August 1992 (aged 22)
Daryl Impey (RSA)	6 December 1984 (aged 30)
Jens Keukeleire (BEL)	23 November 1988 (aged 26)
Brett Lancaster (AUS)	15 November 1979 (aged 35)
Michael Matthews (AUS)	26 September 1990 (aged 24)
Christian Meier (CAN)	2 September 1985 (aged 29)
Cameron Meyer (AUS)	11 January 1988 (aged 26)
Jens Mouris (NED)	12 March 1980 (aged 34)
Ivan Santaromita (ITA)	30 April 1984 (aged 30)
Svein Tuft (CAN)	19 May 1977 (aged 37)
Pieter Weening (NED)	5 April 1981 (aged 33)
Adam Yates (GBR)	7 August 1992 (aged 22)
Simon Yates (GBR)	7 August 1992 (aged 22)

Riders who joined the team for the 2015 season

Rider	2014 team
Adam Blythe	NFTO
Magnus Cort	Team Cult Energy
Caleb Ewan	neo-pro (Jayco-AIS World Tour Academy)

Riders who left the team during or after the 2014 season

Rider	2015 team
Matthew Goss	MTN–Qhubeka
Aidis Kruopis	An Post–Chain Reaction
Nino Schurter	

== Season victories ==
Date	Race	Competition	Rider	Country	Location
25 January	Tour Down Under, Sprints classification	UCI World Tour	Daryl Impey (RSA)	Australia	
5 February	Herald Sun Tour, Stage 1	UCI Oceania Tour	Cameron Meyer (AUS)	Australia	Bendigo
6 February	Herald Sun Tour, Stage 2	UCI Oceania Tour	Caleb Ewan (AUS)	Australia	Nagambie
7 February	Herald Sun Tour, Stage 3	UCI Oceania Tour	Caleb Ewan (AUS)	Australia	Nagambie
8 February	Herald Sun Tour, Overall	UCI Oceania Tour	Cameron Meyer (AUS)	Australia	
8 February	Herald Sun Tour, Points classification	UCI Oceania Tour	Cameron Meyer (AUS)	Australia	
8 February	Herald Sun Tour, Teams classification	UCI Oceania Tour	(Note: The riders on the squad were Simon Clarke, Caleb Ewan, Michael Hepburn, Cameron Meyer, Sam Bewley and Damien Howson)	Australia	
10 March	Tour de Langkawi, Stage 3	UCI Asia Tour	Caleb Ewan (AUS)	Malaysia	Tanah Merah
11 March	Paris–Nice, Stage 3	UCI World Tour	Michael Matthews (AUS)	France	Saint-Pourçain-sur-Sioule
13 March	Tour de Langkawi, Stage 6	UCI Asia Tour	Caleb Ewan (AUS)	Malaysia	Karak
15 March	Tour de Langkawi, Points classification	UCI Asia Tour	Caleb Ewan (AUS)	Malaysia	
15 March	Paris–Nice, Points classification	UCI World Tour	Michael Matthews (AUS)	France	
5 April	Vuelta a La Rioja	UCI Europe Tour	Caleb Ewan (AUS)	Spain	Logroño
6 April	Tour of the Basque Country, Stage 1	UCI World Tour	Michael Matthews (AUS)	Spain	Bilbao
29 April	Tour de Romandie, Stage 2	UCI World Tour	Michael Albasini (SUI)	Switzerland	Saint-Imier
30 April	Tour de Romandie, Stage 3	UCI World Tour	Michael Albasini (SUI)	Switzerland	Porrentruy
9 May	Giro d'Italia, Stage 1	UCI World Tour	Team time trial (Note: The riders on the squad were Michael Matthews, Sam Bewley, Esteban Chaves, Simon Clarke, Luke Durbridge, Simon Gerrans, Michael Hepburn, Brett Lancaster and Pieter Weening)	Italy	Sanremo
11 May	Giro d'Italia, Stage 3	UCI World Tour	Michael Matthews (AUS)	Italy	Sestri Levante
8 June	Tour de Korea, Stage 2	UCI Asia Tour	Caleb Ewan (AUS)	South Korea	Muju
9 June	Tour de Korea, Stage 3	UCI Asia Tour	Caleb Ewan (AUS)	South Korea	Muju
11 June	Tour de Korea, Stage 5	UCI Asia Tour	Caleb Ewan (AUS)	South Korea	Gangjin
13 June	Tour de Korea, Stage 7	UCI Asia Tour	Caleb Ewan (AUS)	South Korea	Daejeon
14 June	Tour de Korea, Overall	UCI Asia Tour	Caleb Ewan (AUS)	South Korea	
14 June	Tour de Korea, Points classification	UCI Asia Tour	Caleb Ewan (AUS)	South Korea	
14 June	Tour de Korea, Young rider classification	UCI Asia Tour	Caleb Ewan (AUS)	South Korea	
14 June	Critérium du Dauphiné, Young rider classification	UCI World Tour	Simon Yates (GBR)	France	
16 June	Tour de Suisse, Stage 4	UCI World Tour	Michael Matthews (AUS)	Switzerland	Schwarzenbach
1 August	Clásica de San Sebastián	UCI World Tour	Adam Yates (GBR)	Spain	San Sebastián
23 August	Vuelta a España, Stage 2	UCI World Tour	Esteban Chaves (COL)	Spain	Caminito del Rey
26 August	Vuelta a España, Stage 5	UCI World Tour	Caleb Ewan (AUS)	Spain	Alcalá de Guadaíra
27 August	Vuelta a España, Stage 6	UCI World Tour	Esteban Chaves (COL)	Spain	Sierra de Cazorla
3 September	Tour of Alberta, Stage 2	UCI America Tour	Michael Matthews (AUS)	Canada	Grande Prairie
7 September	Tour of Alberta, Young rider classification	UCI America Tour	Adam Yates (GBR)	Canada	
7 September	Tour of Alberta, Points classification	UCI America Tour	Michael Matthews (AUS)	Canada	
10 October	Abu Dhabi Tour, Stage 3	UCI Asia Tour	Esteban Chaves (COL)	United Arab Emirates	Jebel Hafeet
11 October	Abu Dhabi Tour, Overall	UCI Asia Tour	Esteban Chaves (COL)	United Arab Emirates	
11 October	Abu Dhabi Tour, Young rider classification	UCI Asia Tour	Esteban Chaves (COL)	United Arab Emirates	

== National, Continental and World champions 2015 ==
Date	Discipline	Jersey	Rider	Country	Location
5 February	South African National Time Trial Champion		Daryl Impey (RSA)	South Africa	Mbombela
