= 2015 Herald Sun Tour =

2015 UCI Oceania Tour
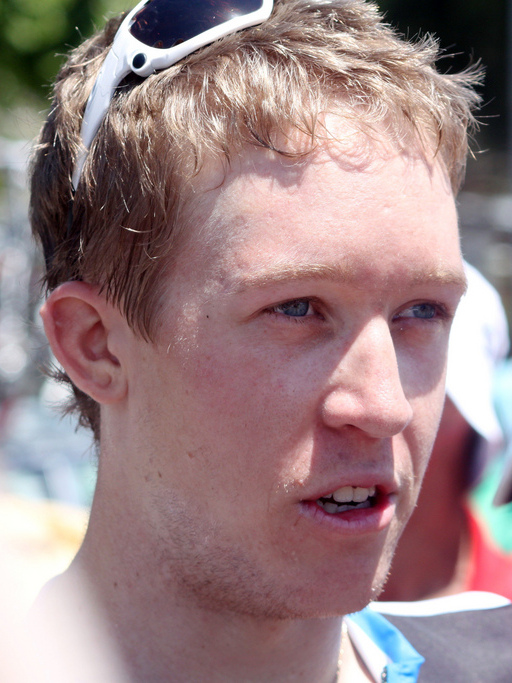
- Cameron Meyer, the winner of the 2015 Herald Sun Tour

Race details
- Dates: 4–8 February 2015
- Stages: 5
- Distance: 534.9 km (332.4 mi)
- Winning time: 12h 30' 55"

Results
Jersey awarded to the overall winner	Winner	Cameron Meyer (AUS)	(Orica–GreenEDGE)
	Second	Patrick Bevin (NZL)	(Avanti Racing Team)
	Third	Joseph Cooper (AUS)	(Avanti Racing Team)
Jersey awarded to the points classification winner	Points	Cameron Meyer (AUS)	(Orica–GreenEDGE)
Jersey awarded to the mountains classification winner	Mountains	Cameron Bayly (AUS)	(Search2retain–Health.com.au)
Jersey awarded to the young rider classification winner	Young rider	Robert Power (AUS)	(Jayco–AIS Australia U23)
	Team	Orica–GreenEDGE	

The 2015 Jayco Herald Sun Tour was the 62nd edition of the Herald Sun Tour road cycling stage race. The race was rated as 2.1 and was part of the 2015 UCI Oceania Tour. The 2015 race consisted of five stages in Victoria, starting in Melbourne on 4 February and finished at the summit finish on Arthurs Seat on 8 February.

The race was won by Australian Cameron Meyer of the Orica–GreenEDGE cycling team. Meyer succeeded his teammate Simon Clarke, who won the 2014 edition of the race and finished fourth in the 2015 race. Meyer had taken over the overall lead following a victory in the first road stage of the race and was able to defend his lead through the remaining stages. The other riders to finish on the overall podium were Patrick Bevin and Joseph Cooper (both Avanti Racing Team).

Meyer also won the points classification, while Cameron Bayly (Search2retain–Health.com.au) won the mountains classification and Robert Power (Jayco–AIS Australia U23) won the young rider classification. Orica–GreenEDGE won the teams classification.

== Teams ==
16 teams entered the 2015 Herald Sun Tour, of which one (Orica–GreenEDGE) was a UCI World Tour team and three were national teams.

- Orica–GreenEDGE
- MTN–Qhubeka
- UnitedHealthcare
- Androni Giocattoli
- Drapac Professional Cycling
- JLT–Condor
- Avanti Racing Team
- Team Budget Forklifts
- Search2retain–Health.com.au
- Charter Mason–Giant Racing Team
- Navitas Satalyst
- African Wildlife Safaris Cycling Team
- Data#3–Symantec Racing Team p/b Scody
- Australia
- Great Britain
- Jayco–AIS Australia U23

== Route ==
List of stages
Stage	Date	Course	Distance	Type	Winner
P	4 February	Melbourne	2.1 km (1.3 mi)	Individual time trial	Will Clarke (AUS)
1	5 February	Mount Macedon to Bendigo	146.2 km (90.8 mi)	Hilly stage	Cameron Meyer (AUS)
2	6 February	Bendigo to Nagambie	117.9 km (73.3 mi)	Flat stage	Caleb Ewan (AUS)
3	7 February	Mitchellstown to Nagambie	146.7 km (91.2 mi)	Flat stage	Caleb Ewan (AUS)
4	8 February	Arthurs Seat to Arthurs Seat	122 km (75.8 mi)	Hilly stage	Patrick Bevin (NZL)

== Stages ==
=== Prologue ===
4 February 2015 — Melbourne, 2.1 km (1.3 mi), individual time trial (ITT)

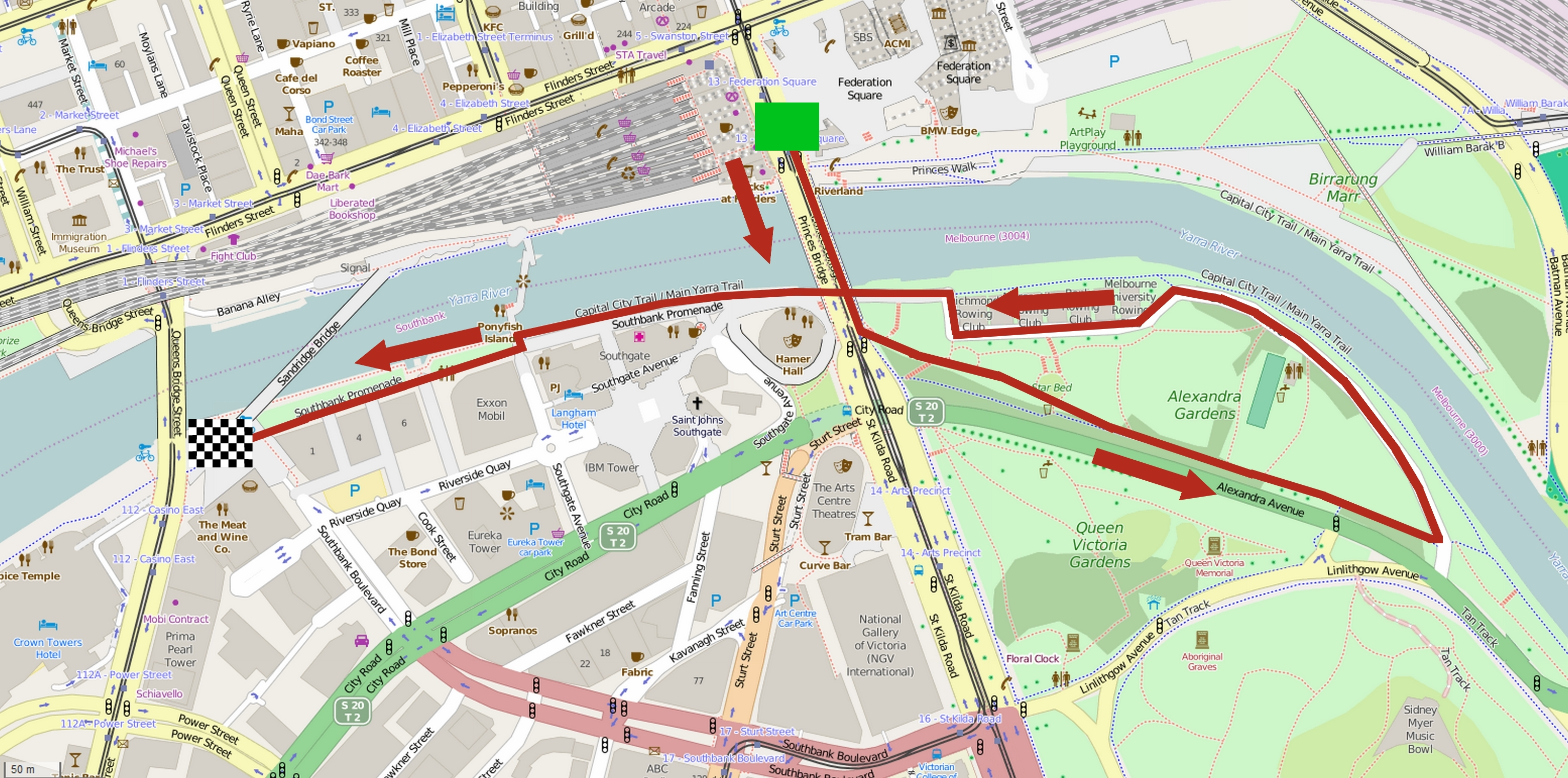
Prologue route

Prologue result & general classification after Prologue

	Rider	Team	Time
1	Will Clarke (AUS)	Drapac Professional Cycling	2' 35"
2	Caleb Ewan (AUS)	Orica–GreenEDGE	+ 1"
3	Brenton Jones (AUS)	Drapac Professional Cycling	+ 1"
4	Sam Bewley (NZL)	Orica–GreenEDGE	+ 2"
5	Neil Van der Ploeg (AUS)	Avanti Racing Team	+ 2"
6	Michael Hepburn (AUS)	Orica–GreenEDGE	+ 2"
7	Simon Clarke (AUS)	Orica–GreenEDGE	+ 2"
8	Patrick Bevin (NZL)	Avanti Racing Team	+ 2"
9	Paul van der Ploeg (AUS)	Charter Mason–Giant Racing Team	+ 2"
10	Joseph Cooper (NZL)	Avanti Racing Team	+ 3"

=== Stage 1 ===
5 February 2015 — Mount Macedon to Bendigo, 146.2 km (90.8 mi)

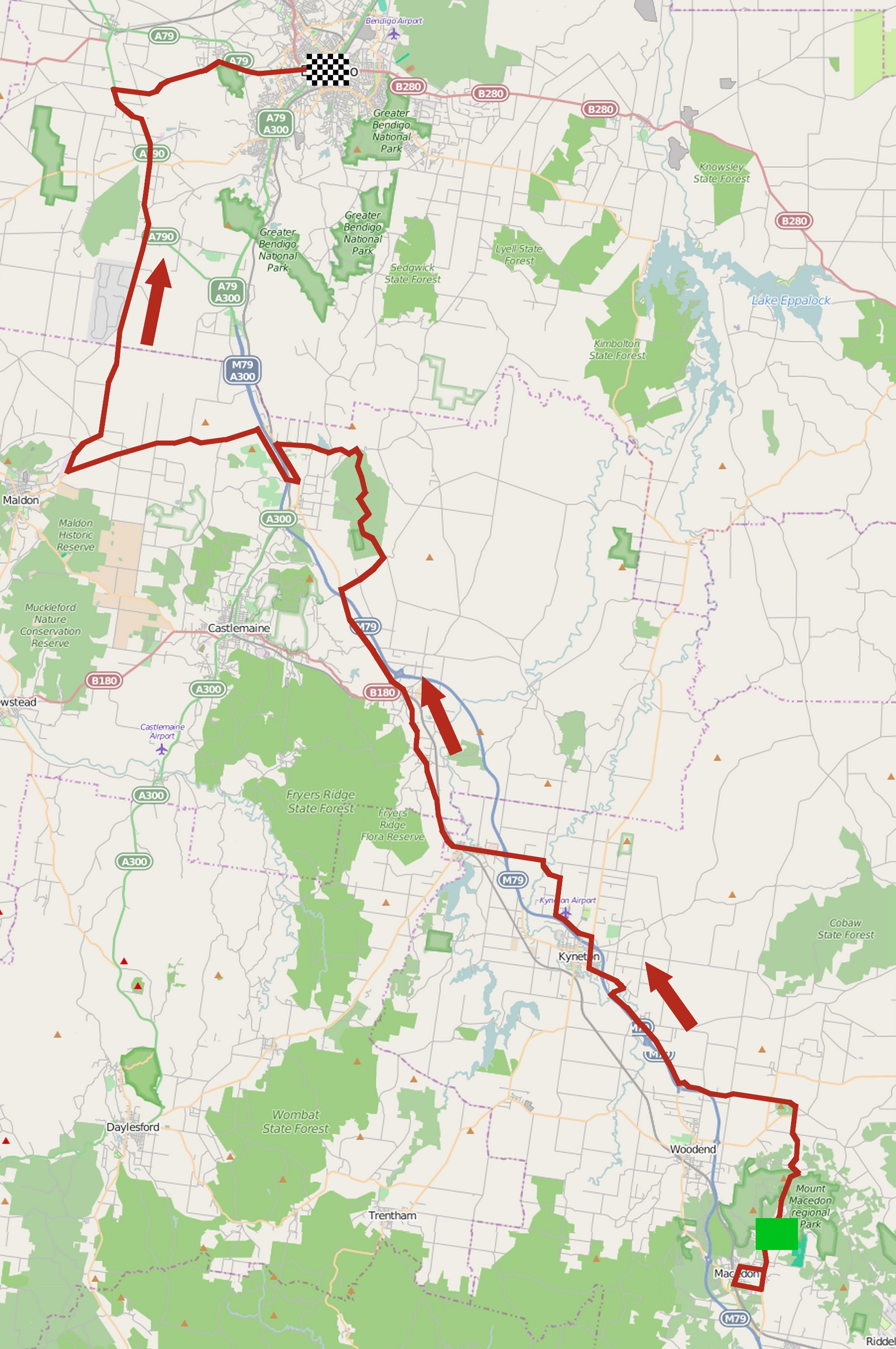
Stage 1 route

Stage 1 Result

	Rider	Team	Time
1	Cameron Meyer (AUS)	Orica–GreenEDGE	3h 29' 47"
2	Joseph Cooper (NZL)	Avanti Racing Team	+ 0"
3	Patrick Bevin (NZL)	Avanti Racing Team	+ 10"
4	Simon Clarke (AUS)	Orica–GreenEDGE	+ 10"
5	Daniel Summerhill (USA)	UnitedHealthcare	+ 10"
6	Franco Pellizotti (ITA)	Androni Giocattoli	+ 10"
7	Serge Pauwels (BEL)	MTN–Qhubeka	+ 10"
8	Grant Ferguson (GBR)	Great Britain (national team)	+ 10"
9	Damien Howson (AUS)	Orica–GreenEDGE	+ 10"
10	Brendan Canty (AUS)	Team Budget Forklifts	+ 10"

General Classification after Stage 1

	Rider	Team	Time
1	Cameron Meyer (AUS)	Orica–GreenEDGE	3h 32' 15"
2	Joseph Cooper (NZL)	Avanti Racing Team	+ 4"
3	Patrick Bevin (NZL)	Avanti Racing Team	+ 15"
4	Simon Clarke (AUS)	Orica–GreenEDGE	+ 19"
5	Lachlan Norris (AUS)	Drapac Professional Cycling	+ 23"
6	Damien Howson (AUS)	Orica–GreenEDGE	+ 23"
7	Daniel Summerhill (USA)	UnitedHealthcare	+ 24"
8	Lachlan Morton (AUS)	Australia (national team)	+ 27"
9	Scott Davies (GBR)	Great Britain (national team)	+ 28"
10	Mitchell Cooper (AUS)	Navitas Satalyst	+ 28"

=== Stage 2 ===
6 February 2015 — Bendigo to Nagambie, 117.9 km (73.3 mi)

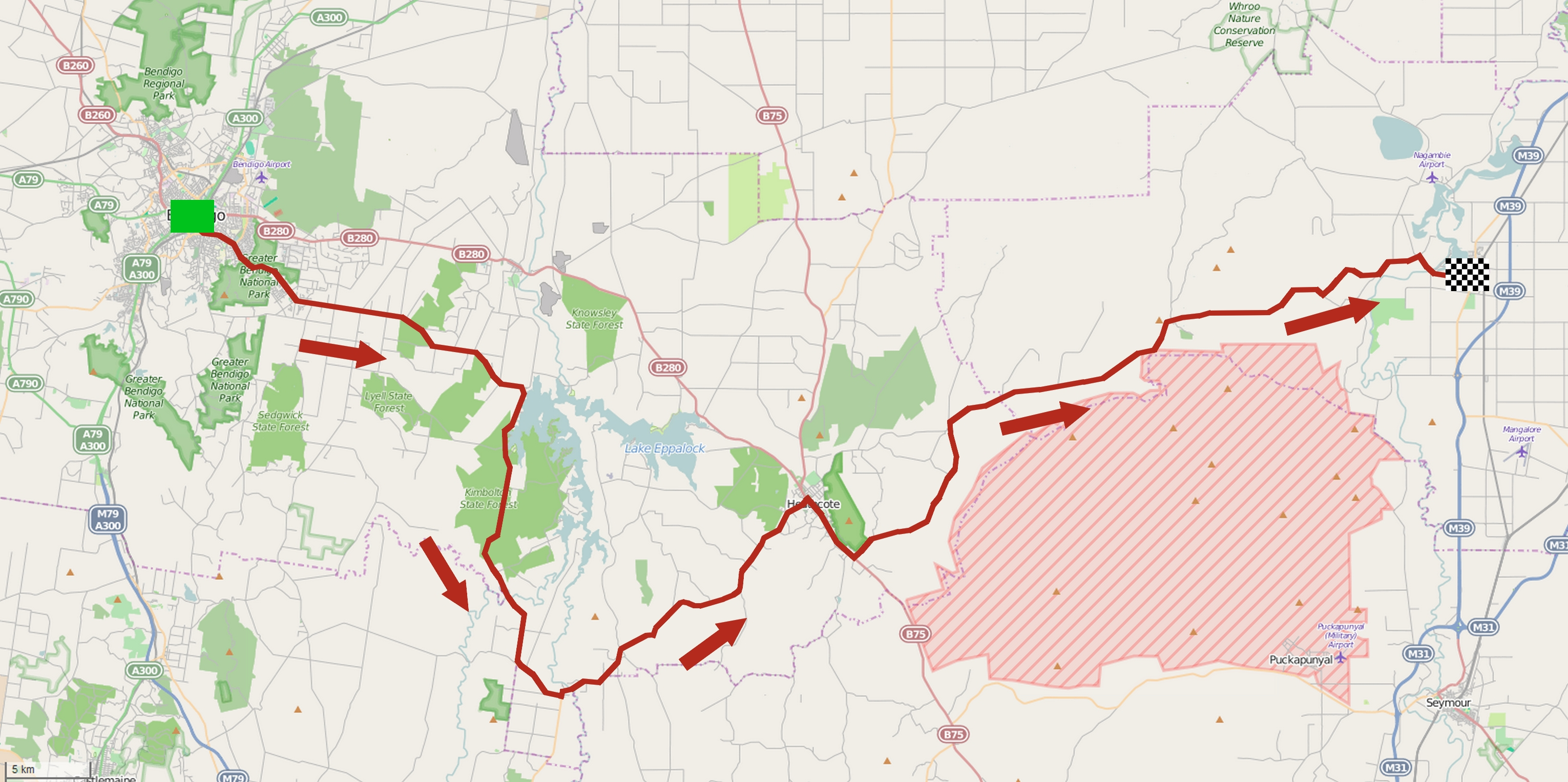
Stage 2 route

Stage 2 Result

	Rider	Team	Time
1	Caleb Ewan (AUS)	Orica–GreenEDGE	2h 38' 51"
2	Steele Von Hoff (AUS)	Australia (national team)	+ 0"
3	Sam Witmitz (AUS)	Team Budget Forklifts	+ 0"
4	John Murphy (USA)	UnitedHealthcare	+ 0"
5	Brenton Jones (AUS)	Drapac Professional Cycling	+ 0"
6	Massimo Graziato (ITA)	African Wildlife Safaris Cycling Team	+ 0"
7	James Mowatt (AUS)	Data#3–Symantec Racing Team p/b Scody	+ 0"
8	Graham Briggs (GBR)	JLT–Condor	+ 0"
9	Michael Rice (AUS)	Search2retain–Health.com.au	+ 0"
10	Tanner Putt (USA)	UnitedHealthcare	+ 0"

General Classification after Stage 2

	Rider	Team	Time
1	Cameron Meyer (AUS)	Orica–GreenEDGE	6h 11' 06"
2	Joseph Cooper (NZL)	Avanti Racing Team	+ 4"
3	Patrick Bevin (NZL)	Avanti Racing Team	+ 15"
4	Simon Clarke (AUS)	Orica–GreenEDGE	+ 19"
5	Lachlan Norris (AUS)	Drapac Professional Cycling	+ 23"
6	Damien Howson (AUS)	Orica–GreenEDGE	+ 23"
7	Daniel Summerhill (USA)	UnitedHealthcare	+ 24"
8	Lachlan Morton (AUS)	Australia (national team)	+ 27"
9	Scott Davies (GBR)	Great Britain (national team)	+ 28"
10	Mitchell Cooper (AUS)	Navitas Satalyst	+ 28"

=== Stage 3 ===
7 February 2015 — Mitchellstown to Nagambie, 146.7 km (91.2 mi)

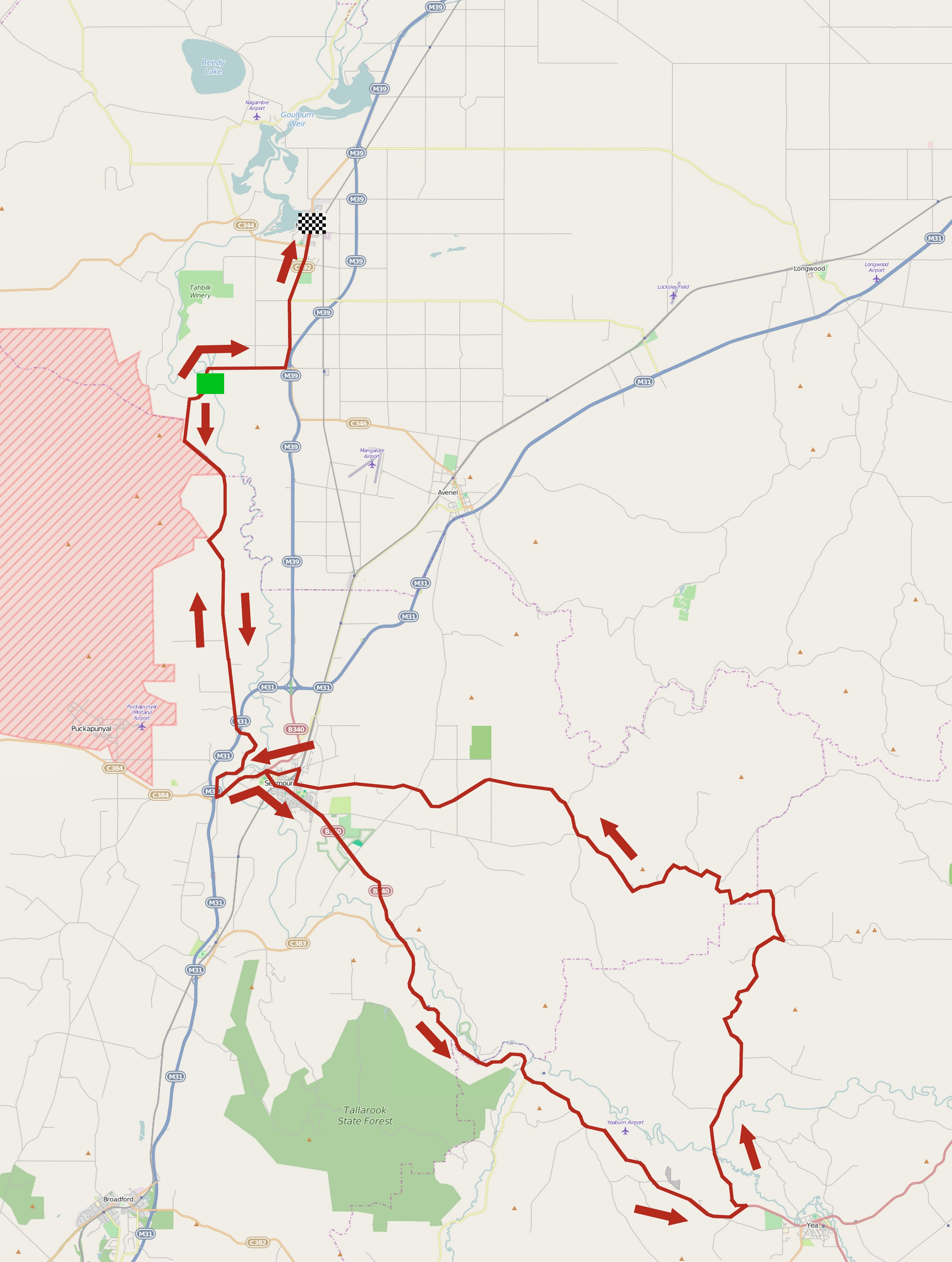
Stage 3 route

Stage 3 Result

	Rider	Team	Time
1	Caleb Ewan (AUS)	Orica–GreenEDGE	3h 25' 17"
2	Tyler Farrar (USA)	MTN–Qhubeka	+ 0"
3	Steele Von Hoff (AUS)	Australia (national team)	+ 0"
4	John Murphy (USA)	UnitedHealthcare	+ 0"
5	Will Clarke (AUS)	Drapac Professional Cycling	+ 0"
6	Tiziano Dall'Antonia (ITA)	Androni Giocattoli	+ 0"
7	Felix English (IRE)	JLT–Condor	+ 0"
8	Grayson Napier (AUS)	Navitas Satalyst	+ 0"
9	Patrick Bevin (NZL)	Avanti Racing Team	+ 0"
10	James Mowatt (AUS)	Data#3–Symantec Racing Team p/b Scody	+ 0"

General Classification after Stage 3

	Rider	Team	Time
1	Cameron Meyer (AUS)	Orica–GreenEDGE	9h 36' 23"
2	Joseph Cooper (NZL)	Avanti Racing Team	+ 4"
3	Patrick Bevin (NZL)	Avanti Racing Team	+ 15"
4	Simon Clarke (AUS)	Orica–GreenEDGE	+ 19"
5	Lachlan Norris (AUS)	Drapac Professional Cycling	+ 23"
6	Damien Howson (AUS)	Orica–GreenEDGE	+ 23"
7	Daniel Summerhill (USA)	UnitedHealthcare	+ 24"
8	Lachlan Morton (AUS)	Australia (national team)	+ 27"
9	Scott Davies (GBR)	Great Britain (national team)	+ 28"
10	Mitchell Cooper (AUS)	Navitas Satalyst	+ 28"

=== Stage 4 ===
8 February 2015 — Arthurs Seat to Arthurs Seat, 122 km (75.8 mi)

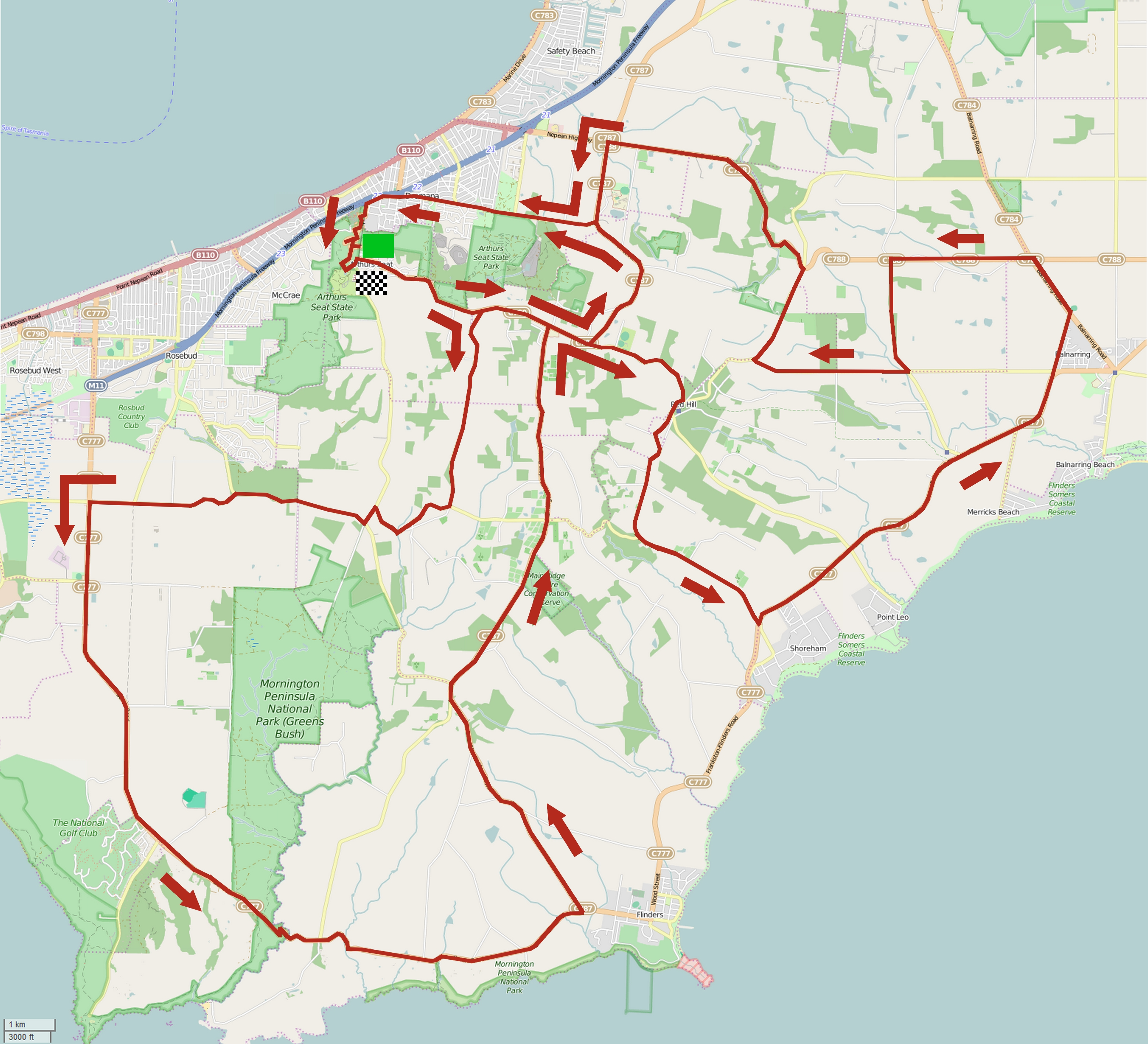
Stage 4 route

Stage 4 Result

	Rider	Team	Time
1	Patrick Bevin (NZL)	Avanti Racing Team	2h 54' 38"
2	Cameron Meyer (AUS)	Orica–GreenEDGE	+ 0"
3	Simon Clarke (AUS)	Orica–GreenEDGE	+ 0"
4	Brendan Canty (AUS)	Team Budget Forklifts	+ 2"
5	Robert Power (AUS)	Jayco–AIS Australia U23	+ 2"
6	Franco Pellizotti (ITA)	Androni Giocattoli	+ 4"
7	Damien Howson (AUS)	Orica–GreenEDGE	+ 6"
8	Scott Davies (GBR)	Great Britain (national team)	+ 7"
9	Joseph Cooper (NZL)	Avanti Racing Team	+ 9"
10	Serge Pauwels (BEL)	MTN–Qhubeka	+ 11"

Final General Classification

	Rider	Team	Time
1	Cameron Meyer (AUS)	Orica–GreenEDGE	12h 30' 55"
2	Patrick Bevin (NZL)	Avanti Racing Team	+ 11"
3	Joseph Cooper (NZL)	Avanti Racing Team	+ 19"
4	Simon Clarke (AUS)	Orica–GreenEDGE	+ 21"
5	Damien Howson (AUS)	Orica–GreenEDGE	+ 35"
6	Robert Power (AUS)	Jayco–AIS Australia U23	+ 37"
7	Brendan Canty (AUS)	Team Budget Forklifts	+ 39"
8	Lachlan Norris (AUS)	Drapac Professional Cycling	+ 40"
9	Franco Pellizotti (ITA)	Androni Giocattoli	+ 40"
10	Scott Davies (GBR)	Great Britain (national team)	+ 41"

== Classification leadership table ==
In the 2015 Herald Sun Tour, four different jerseys were awarded. For the general classification, calculated by adding each cyclist's finishing times on each stage, and allowing time bonuses for the first three finishers at intermediate sprints and at the finish of mass-start stages, the leader received a yellow jersey. This classification was considered the most important of the 2015 Herald Sun Tour, and the winner of the classification was considered the winner of the race.

Additionally, there was a points classification, which awarded a green jersey. In the points classification, cyclists received points for finishing in the top 4 in a mass-start stage. For winning a stage, a rider earned 10 points, with 8 for second, 6 for third and 4 for fourth. Points towards the classification could also be accrued at intermediate sprint points during each stage; these intermediate sprints also offered bonus seconds towards the general classification. There was also a mountains classification, the leadership of which was marked by a yellow-and-black jersey. In the mountains classification, points were won by reaching the top of a climb before other cyclists, with more points available for the higher-categorised climbs.

The fourth jersey represented the young rider classification, marked by a white-and-blue jersey. This was decided in the same way as the general classification, but only riders born after 1 January 1992 were eligible to be ranked in the classification. There was also a classification for teams, in which the times of the best three cyclists per team on each stage were added together; the leading team at the end of the race was the team with the lowest total time, and its team members were given a white jersey on the final podium.

Stage	Winner	General classification	Points classification	Mountain classification	Young rider classification	Team classification
P	Will Clarke	Will Clarke	Not awarded	Not awarded	Caleb Ewan	Orica–GreenEDGE
1	Cameron Meyer	Cameron Meyer	Cameron Meyer	Robert Power	Scott Davies	Orica–GreenEDGE
2	Caleb Ewan	Cameron Meyer	Cameron Meyer	Robert Power	Scott Davies	Orica–GreenEDGE
3	Caleb Ewan	Cameron Meyer	Caleb Ewan	Robert Power	Scott Davies	Orica–GreenEDGE
4	Patrick Bevin	Cameron Meyer	Cameron Meyer	Cameron Bayly	Robert Power	Orica–GreenEDGE
Final		Cameron Meyer	Cameron Meyer	Cameron Bayly	Robert Power	Orica–GreenEDGE
