= Chris Hamilton (cyclist) =

Australian cyclist (born 1995)

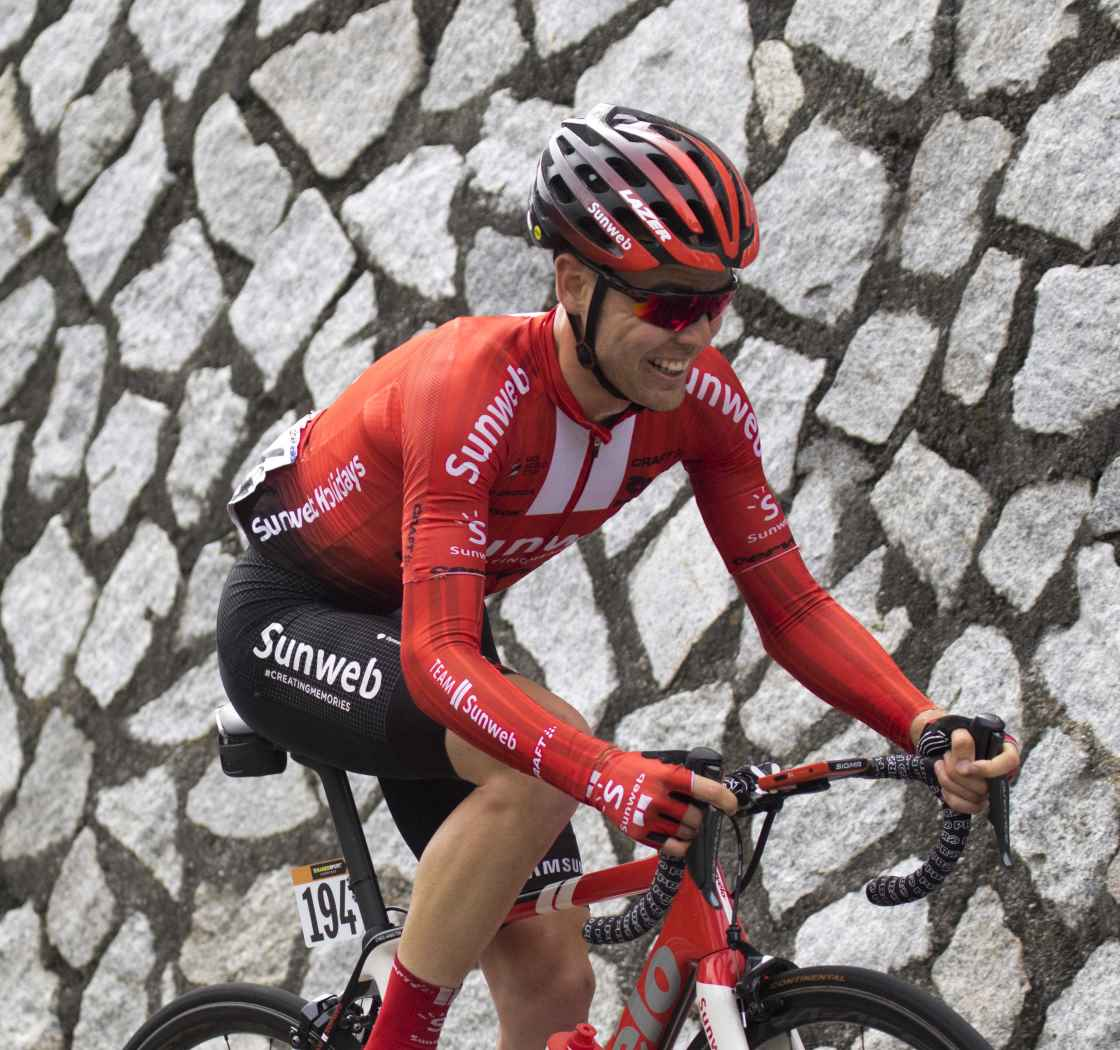
- Hamilton in the 2019 Giro d'Italia

Personal information
- Full name: Christopher Hamilton
- Born: 18 May 1995 (age 31) Bendigo, Victoria, Australia
- Height: 1.78 m (5 ft 10 in)
- Weight: 70 kg (154 lb)

Cycling career
- Sport: Cycling
- Current team: Team Picnic–PostNL
- Discipline: Road
- Role: Rider
- Rider type: Climber

Professional teams
- 2014–2016: Avanti IsoWhey Sports
- 2017–: Team Sunweb

Major wins
- Grand Tours Vuelta a España 1 TTT stage (2023)

Christopher Hamilton (born 18 May 1995) is an Australian road cyclist, who currently rides for UCI WorldTeam Team Picnic–PostNL. In 2016 he won the U-23 Australian National Road Race Championships. He was named in the startlist for the 2017 Vuelta a España. In May 2018, he was named in the startlist for the 2018 Giro d'Italia.

He is not related to Australian cyclist Lucas Hamilton.

== Major results ==
2015
1st Criterium, National Under-23 Road Championships
2016
1st Road race, National Under-23 Road Championships
7th Overall Tour de Taiwan
8th Overall Herald Sun Tour

1st Young rider classification

2018
9th Overall Tour of Britain
2019
6th Overall Tour Down Under

1st Young rider classification

8th Overall Tour de Pologne
2022
9th Overall CRO Race
2023
1st Stage 1 (TTT) Vuelta a España
2024
5th Road race, National Road Championships
7th Cadel Evans Great Ocean Road Race

=== Grand Tour general classification results timeline ===
Grand Tour	2017	2018	2019	2020	2021	2022	2023	2024	2025
Giro d'Italia	—	103	34	29	45	39	—	36	47
Tour de France	—	—	—	—	—	37	46	—	—
Vuelta a España	121	—	—	—	64	—	63	68	53

Legend
—	Did not compete
DNF	Did not finish
