= Cameron Bayly =

Australian cyclist (born 1990)

Personal information
- Born: 11 October 1990 (age 36)

Cycling career
- Sport: Cycling
- Discipline: Road
- Role: Rider

Professional teams
- 2011: V Australia
- 2014: OCBC Singapore Continental Cycling Team
- 2015: Search2retain–Health.com.au
- 2016: Attaque Team Gusto
- 2017–2018: IsoWhey Sports SwissWellness

Cameron Bayly (born 11 October 1990) is an Australian professional racing cyclist. He won the mountains classification of the 2015 Herald Sun Tour and the third stage of the 2016 Tour of Taihu Lake.

== Major results ==
2014
3rd Overall Tour de Kumano
8th Overall Tour of Japan
8th Overall Tour de Korea
2015
1st Mountains classification Herald Sun Tour
2016
1st Stage 3 Tour of Taihu Lake
5th Overall Bałtyk–Karkonosze Tour
7th Overall Tour of Japan
9th Overall Tour of Thailand
10th Tour of Yancheng Coastal Wetlands
2017
2nd Overall Tour de Langkawi
2nd Grand Prix de la ville de Pérenchies
6th Overall Tour of China I
2018
1st Stage 4 Tour de Taiwan
