= 2013 UCI Road World Championships – Men's junior road race =

Men's junior road race
2013 UCI Road World Championships
- Rainbow jersey

Race details
- Dates: 28 September 2013
- Stages: 1

The Men's junior road race of the 2013 UCI Road World Championships took place in Tuscany, Italy on 28 September 2013.

== Final classification (top 50) ==
Rank	Rider	Country	Time
1st place, gold medalist(s)	Mathieu van der Poel	Netherlands	3 h 33 min 14 s
2nd place, silver medalist(s)	Mads Pedersen	Denmark	+3 s
3rd place, bronze medalist(s)	Iltjan Nika	Albania	+3 s
4	Logan Owen	United States	+3 s
5	Lorenzo Rota	Italy	+3 s
6	Lucas Eriksson	Sweden	+3 s
7	Scott Davies	Great Britain	+3 s
8	Artem Nych	Russia	+3 s
9	Sergey Shemyakin	Kazakhstan	+3 s
10	Benjamin Brkic	Austria	+3 s
11	Lorenzo Fortunato	Italy	+3 s
12	Gracjan Szelag	Poland	+3 s
13	Anatoliy Budyak	Ukraine	+3 s
14	Anders Skaarseth	Norway	+3 s
15	Daniel Martínez	Colombia	+3 s
16	Aliaksandr Riabushenko	Belarus	+3 s
17	Victor Langellotti	Monaco	+3 s
18	Piotr Konwa	Poland	+3 s
19	Robert Power	Australia	+3 s
20	Franck Bonnamour	France	+3 s
21	Jonas Abrahamsen	Norway	+3 s
22	Alessandro Fedeli	Italy	+8 s
23	Caio Godoy Ormenese	Brazil	+8 s
24	Simone Velasco	Italy	+1 min 0 s
25	Christoffer Lisson	Denmark	+1 min 9 s
26	Matic Šafaric Kolar	Slovenia	+1 min 9 s
27	Julian Schulze	Germany	+1 min 9 s
28	Geoffrey Curran	United States	+1 min 9 s
29	José Alfredo Santoyo	Mexico	+1 min 9 s
30	Evgeny Kobernyak	Russia	+1 min 9 s
31	Juan Felipe Osorio	Colombia	+1 min 9 s
32	Sam Oomen	Netherlands	+1 min 9 s
33	Pietro Andreoletti	Italy	+2 min 5 s
34	Mark Padun	Ukraine	+2 min 7 s
35	Laurens De Plus	Belgium	+2 min 7 s
36	Daniel Fitter	Australia	+2 min 24 s
37	Kristjan Kumar	Slovenia	+2 min 40 s
38	Piet Allegaert	Belgium	+2 min 40 s
39	Nikolay Cherkasov	Russia	+3 min 34 s
40	Carlos Gimenez	Venezuela	+3 min 41 s
41	Stef Krul	Netherlands	+3 min 57 s
42	Nathan Van Hooydonck	Belgium	+3 min 57 s
43	David Rivière	France	+3 min 57 s
44	Rémy Rochas	France	+3 min 59 s
45	Yonas Tekeste	Eritrea	+3 min 59 s
46	William Barta	United States	+3 min 59 s
47	Alex Aranburu	Spain	+3 min 59 s
48	Kristian Aasvold	Norway	+3 min 59 s
49	Patrick Müller	Switzerland	+3 min 59 s
50	Mathias Van Gompel	Belgium	+3 min 59 s
