= Scott Davies (cyclist) =

British racing cyclist (born 1995)

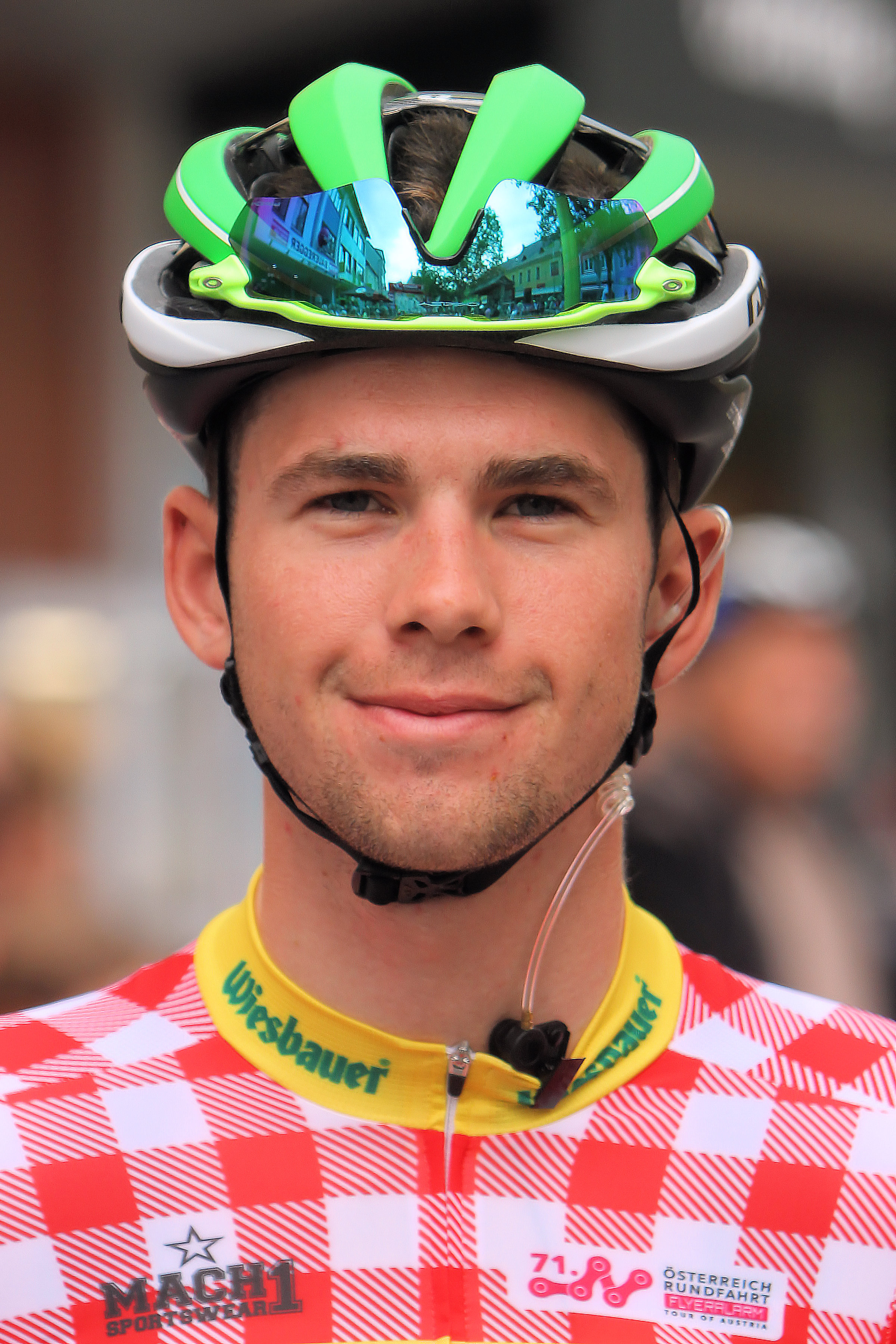
- Davies at the 2019 Tour of Austria

Personal information
- Full name: Scott Davies
- Born: 5 August 1995 (age 31) Carmarthen, Carmarthenshire, Wales
- Height: 6 ft 0 in (183 cm)
- Weight: 68 kg (150 lb)

Cycling career
- Sport: Cycling
- Current team: Retired
- Disciplines: Road; Track
- Role: Rider
- Rider type: Endurance

Amateur teams
- 2009–2010: Towy Riders
- 2011: Towy Racing Cycle Club
- 2012: M&D Cycles
- 2015: Team 100% ME

Professional teams
- 2013: Team USN
- 2014: Madison Genesis
- 2016–2017: WIGGINS
- 2018–2019: Team Dimension Data
- 2020–2021: Bahrain–McLaren

Scott Davies (born 5 August 1995) is a Welsh former racing cyclist, who rode professionally between 2013 and 2021 for the Team USN, Madison Genesis, WIGGINS, Team Dimension Data and Team Bahrain Victorious squads.

== Biography ==
Born in Carmarthen, Davies attended Bro Myrddin Welsh Comprehensive School (Welsh: Ysgol Gyfun Gymraeg Bro Myrddin). Davies represented Wales at the Commonwealth Games in Glasgow, 2014.

He was named as a member of the WIGGINS team for the 2016 season. In May 2019, he was named in the startlist for the Giro d'Italia. In October 2020, he was named in the startlist for the Vuelta a España.

== Major results ==
2012
1st Time trial, National Junior Road Championships
2013
1st Overall Junior Tour of Wales

1st Stage 1 (ITT)

2nd Overall Giro della Lunigiana
7th Road race, UCI Junior Road World Championships
2014
1st Time trial, National Under-23 Road Championships
10th Road race, Commonwealth Games
2015
1st Time trial, National Under-23 Road Championships
6th Overall Flèche du Sud

1st Young rider classification

10th Overall Herald Sun Tour
2016
1st Time trial, National Under-23 Road Championships
2nd Overall Tour Alsace
4th Duo Normand (with Jonathan Dibben)
6th Overall Le Triptyque des Monts et Châteaux
6th Grand Prix de la Ville de Lillers
9th Overall Ronde de l'Isard

1st Stage 4

9th Overall Tour of Croatia
2017
1st Time trial, National Under-23 Road Championships
4th Overall Giro Ciclistico d'Italia
5th Overall Tour Alsace
10th Time trial, UCI Under-23 Road World Championships

=== Grand Tour general classification results timeline ===
Grand Tour	2019	2020
Giro d'Italia	118	—
Tour de France	—	—
Vuelta a España	—	111
