= Taylor Gunman =

New Zealand cyclist (born 1991)

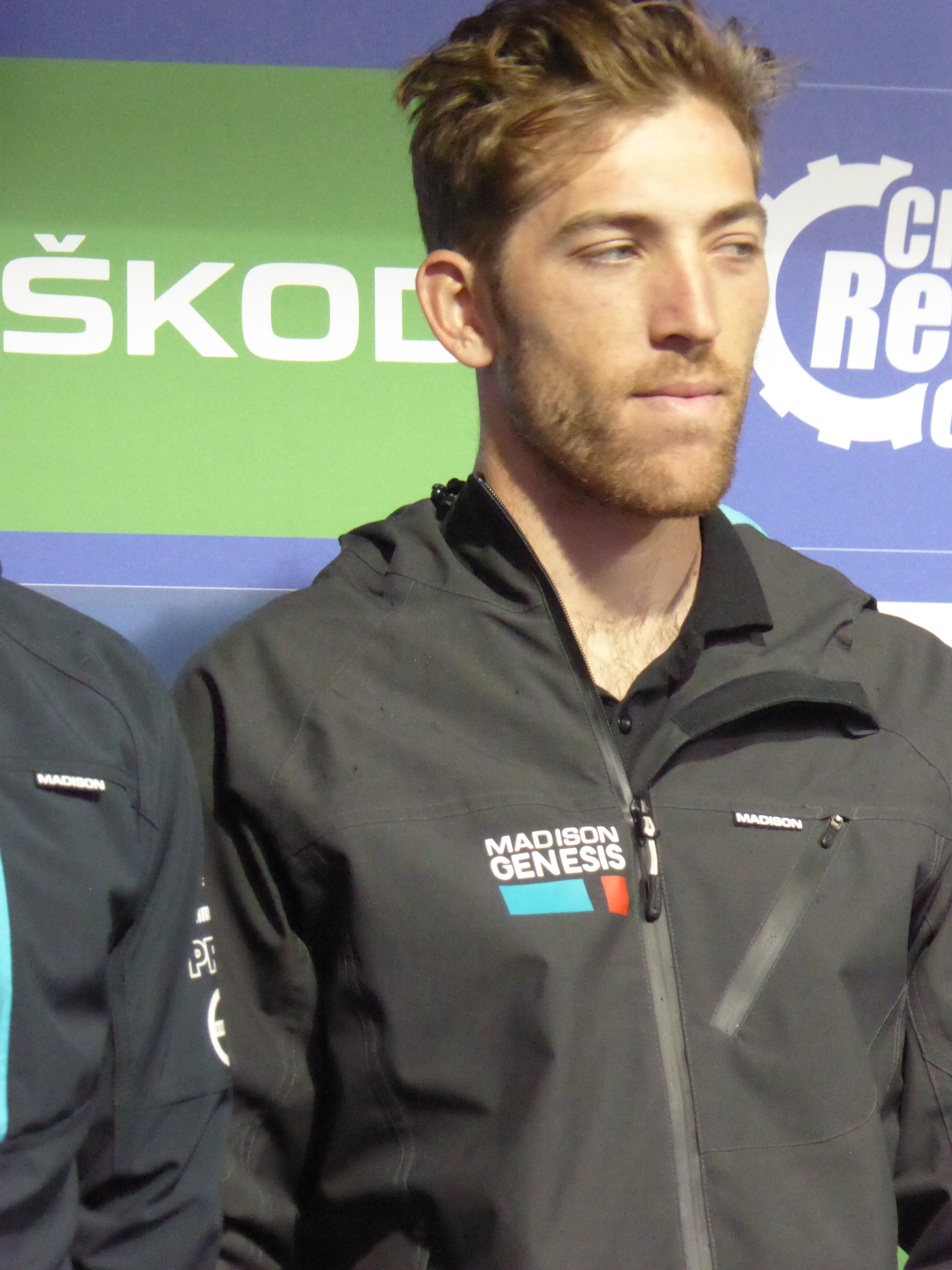
- Gunman at the 2016 Tour of Britain

Personal information
- Full name: Taylor Karl Gunman
- Born: 14 March 1991 (age 35) Takapuna, New Zealand

Cycling career
- Sport: Cycling
- Discipline: Road
- Role: Rider

Amateur teams
- 2012: PureBlack Racing
- 2013: Terra Safety Shoes

Professional teams
- 2011: PureBlack Racing
- 2014–2015: Avanti Racing Team
- 2016–2018: Madison Genesis

Taylor Karl Gunman (born 14 March 1991) is a New Zealand cyclist who last rode for Madison Genesis. He won the 2015 UCI Oceania Tour following his victory in the Oceania Continental Championships road race.

== Major results ==
2009
1st Stage 3 Tour of Northland
3rd Overall Tour de l'Abitibi
2010
1st Stage 2 Tour of Northland
2011
3rd The REV Classic
2013
2nd Overall Tour of Southland

1st Prologue (TTT) & Stage 4

3rd Time trial, National Under-23 Road Championships
2014
1st Time trial, National Road Championships
1st Prologue (TTT) Tour of Southland
6th Time trial, Oceania Road Championships
2015
1st Road race, Oceania Road Championships
1st Overall New Zealand Cycle Classic
2016
3rd The REV Classic
