= Robert Power (Australian cyclist) =

Australian cyclist

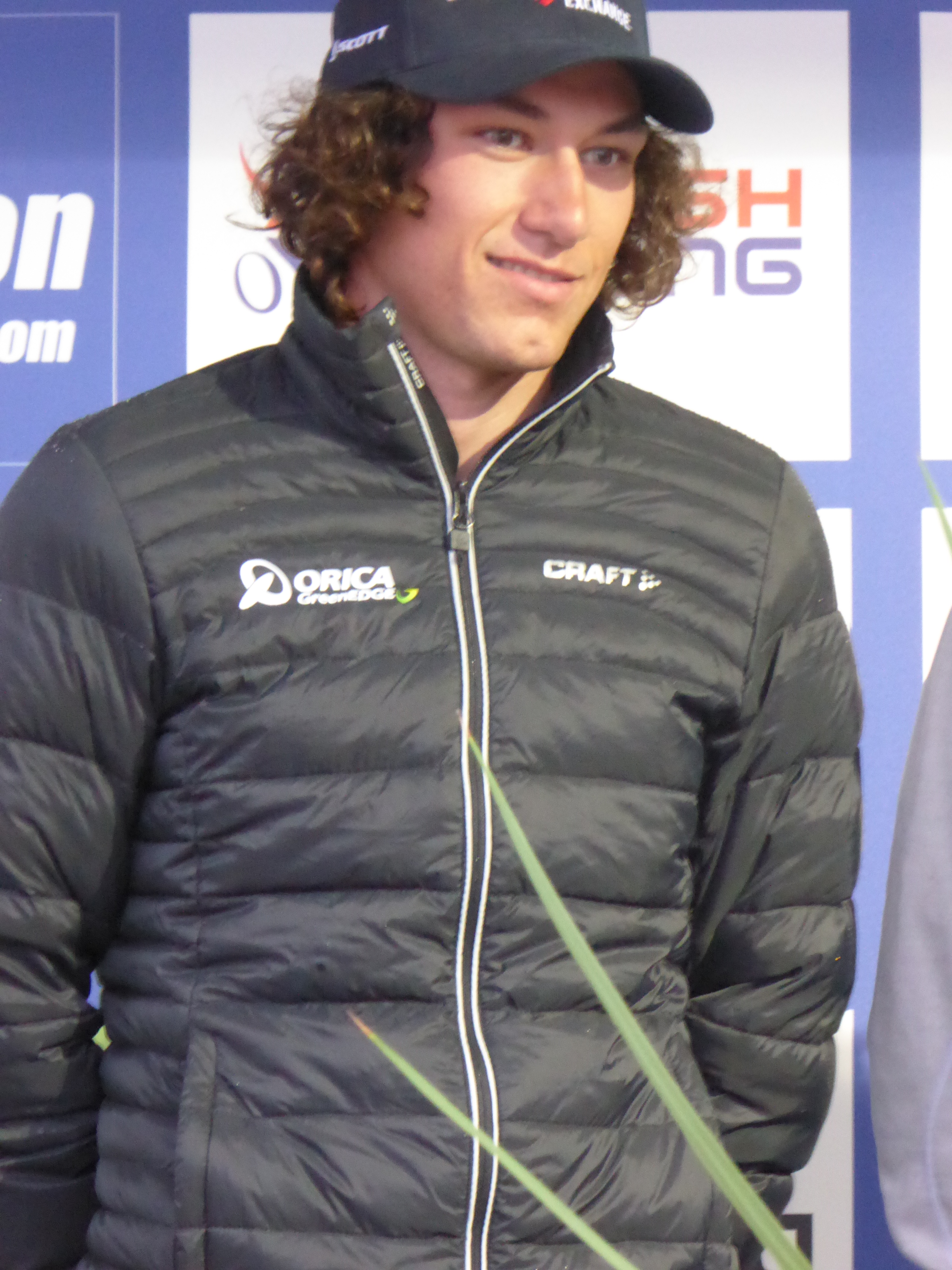
- Power at the 2016 Tour of Britain.

Personal information
- Born: 11 May 1995 (age 31) Perth, Australia
- Height: 184 cm (6 ft 0 in)
- Weight: 68 kg (150 lb)

Cycling career
- Sport: Cycling
- Current team: Team Qhubeka NextHash
- Discipline: Road
- Role: Rider
- Rider type: Climber

Amateur team
- 2014–2015: Jayco-AIS World Tour Academy

Professional teams
- 2016–2018: Orica–GreenEDGE
- 2019–2020: Team Sunweb
- 2021: Team Qhubeka Assos

Major wins
- One-day races and Classics Japan Cup (2018)

Robert Power (born 11 May 1995) is an Australian former road racing cyclist, who rode professionally between 2016 and 2021 for Mitchelton–Scott, Team Sunweb and Team Qhubeka NextHash.

== Career ==
=== Amateur career ===
As a child, Power was a rugby player; his brother Leon Power played professionally in Australia, France and New Zealand. At the age of 13, however, Power suffered a knee injury. The rehabilitation from the injury involved a lot of cycling on the velodrome at the Midland Cycling Club in Perth. Power joined the group rides and, a year later, rode in the national championships. He continued riding in the various age-group categories over the subsequent years.

Power joined the National Junior High Performance Program in 2013. During that season, he won two races (a stage of the Giro della Lunigiana and the Trofeo Buffoni one-day race) as well as recording several other high placings. He was then selected to ride in the junior road race at the Road World Championships in Florence. He attacked on the last lap of the race in an attempt to catch a leading group but was caught and finished in the main bunch in 19th place.

At the beginning of the 2014 season, Power competed in the under-23 national road race, finishing second behind Caleb Ewan. He then made his professional debut in the 2014 Herald Sun Tour, where he finished fourth in the young rider classification. Power's next race was the road race at the Oceania Road Cycling Championships; he came second in the elite race won by Luke Durbridge and won the under-23 classification. The points he won in this race would earn him victory in the 2014 UCI Oceania Tour rankings. Following this result, he was signed to ride with the Jayco-AIS World Tour Academy and achieved a podium finish in his first race for the team. Other victories followed over the course of the season, as well as a seventh-place finish in the professional-level Tour d'Azerbaïdjan. During the Tour d'Azerbaïdjan, Power was described by Ewan as "unbelievably talented".

Power competed for the Australian team at the 2014 Tour de l'Avenir, the most important under-23 stage race on the cycling calendar. He had five top-ten stage finishes, including a second-place finish behind Miguel Ángel López in a two-man sprint on stage 6. He finished in second place overall, 30 seconds behind López. Power's final race of the season was the under-23 road race at the Road World Championships; his teammate Caleb Ewan finished second, while Power finished in the main bunch in 35th place.

=== Professional career ===
Power made his UCI World Tour debut at the 2015 Tour Down Under, riding for the UniSA–Australia team. He was the youngest rider in the race; he finished 41st overall and 10th in the youth classification. During the race, it was announced that he had been signed by the Orica–GreenEDGE team for the 2016 season, alongside Jack Haig and Alex Edmondson. He was described by Matt White, the team's sporting director, as "one of the most exciting climbing talents we've seen in Australian cycling for a very, very long time". Power then rode the 2015 Herald Sun Tour. He took the lead in the mountains classification on the first stage after attacking early on in the stage, then went on to win the young riders classification, take second place in the mountains classification and finish sixth overall in the general classification. After a season of racing in junior races in Europe that included a stage victory and the overall win in the Giro della Valle d'Aosta, Power was selected for the Tour de l'Avenir, where he was considered to be one of the favourites for overall victory. He was forced to pull out, however, in the week before the race due to a knee injury.

==== Orica–GreenEDGE (2016–2018) ====
In November 2015 he was diagnosed with a rare form of bone marrow edema that meant he only made his Orica–BikeExchange debut in August 2016. He made his return to competition at the Arnhem–Veenendaal Classic, before going on to race for 13 days before the end of the year, riding the Tour of Britain and making his Monument debut at Il Lombardia, where he helped deliver team-mate Esteban Chaves to the race win. In his sixth and final race of the season, the Japan Cup, he took his first professional podium, finishing third behind Davide Villella and team-mate Christopher Juul-Jensen.

In 2018, Power put in an active and aggressive performance at Strade Biache, where he finished sixth, before taking his first professional win in July at the Prueba Villafranca de Ordizia, finishing in a one-two ahead of team-mate Simon Yates.

==== Team Sunweb (2019–2020) ====
In September 2018 Team Sunweb announced that they had signed Power on a two-year deal from 2019. In May 2019, he was named in the startlist for the 2019 Giro d'Italia. In August 2019, he was named in the startlist for the 2019 Vuelta a España.

==== Team Qhubeka Assos (2021) ====
In December 2020, Power signed a one-year contract with Team Qhubeka Assos, for the 2021 season. Due to financial problems, the team folded at the end of the 2021 season and Power retired from professional cycling.

== Major results ==
2013
1st Trofeo Buffoni
Oceanian Junior Road Championships

3rd Road race
5th Time trial

3rd Overall Giro della Lunigiana

1st Stage 3

3rd Overall Giro di Basilicata
8th Overall Grand Prix Rüebliland
10th Trofeo Emilio Paganessi
2014
Oceanian Under-23 Road Championships

1st Road race
8th Time trial

1st Gran Premio di Poggiana
1st GP Capodarco
2nd Road race, National Under-23 Road Championships
2nd Overall Tour de l'Avenir
2nd Gran Premio Palio del Recioto
3rd Trofeo Banca Popolare di Vicenza
7th Overall Tour d'Azerbaïdjan
7th Overall Czech Cycling Tour
8th Overall Course de la Paix U23
10th Gran Premio Industrie del Marmo
2015
1st Overall Giro della Valle d'Aosta

1st Prologue

3rd Trofeo Città di San Vendemiano
4th Giro del Belvedere
6th Overall Herald Sun Tour

1st Young rider classification

6th Overall Rhône-Alpes Isère Tour
2016
3rd Japan Cup
2017
4th Pro Ötztaler 5500
5th Prueba Villafranca de Ordizia
2018
1st Prueba Villafranca de Ordizia
1st Japan Cup
6th Strade Bianche

=== Grand Tour general classification results timeline ===
Grand Tour	2019	2020
Giro d'Italia	DNF	—
Tour de France	—	—
Vuelta a España	92	37
