= Will Clarke (cyclist) =

Australian road cyclist

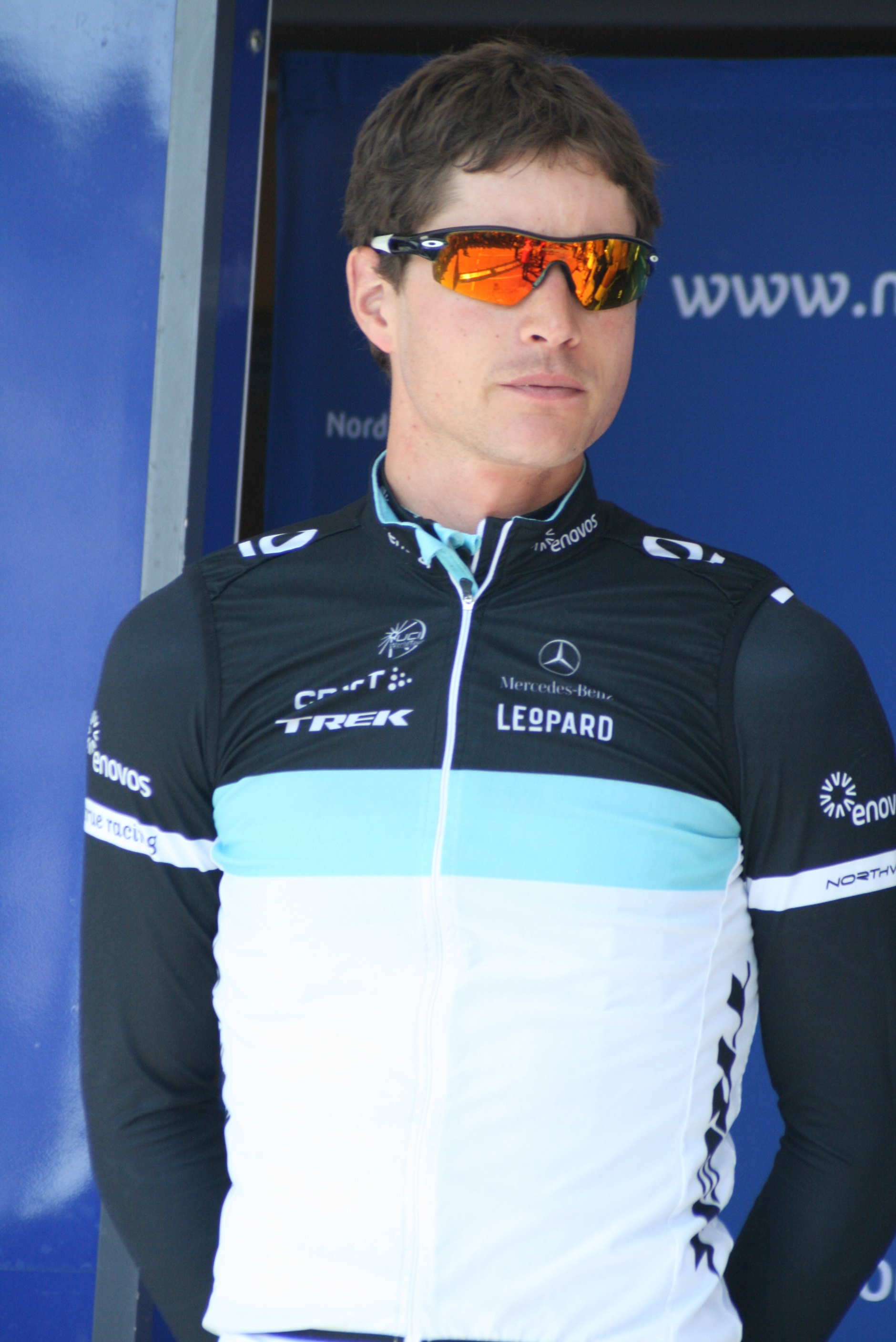
- Clarke at the 2011 Four Days of Dunkirk

Personal information
- Full name: William Clarke
- Nickname: Big horse / Wilbur
- Born: 11 April 1985 (age 41) Campbell Town, Tasmania, Australia
- Height: 1.92 m (6 ft 3 1/2 in)
- Weight: 81 kg (179 lb)

Cycling career
- Sport: Cycling
- Discipline: Road
- Role: Rider
- Rider type: Time trialist

Amateur team
- 2010: Ag2r–La Mondiale (stagiaire)

Professional teams
- 2008–2010: Praties
- 2011: Leopard Trek
- 2012: Champion System
- 2013: Argos–Shimano
- 2014–2016: Drapac Professional Cycling
- 2017–2018: Cannondale–Drapac
- 2019–2020: Trek–Segafredo

William Clarke (born 11 April 1985) is an Australian professional road racing cyclist, who most recently rode for UCI WorldTeam Trek–Segafredo. He is not related to fellow Australian cyclist and past teammate Simon Clarke. William Clarke is a descendant of Australian politician and businessman William John Turner Clarke.

== Career ==
Clarke was born, raised, and resides on his family's 8,100-hectare (20,000-acre) farm near Campbell Town, Tasmania, Australia. Clarke rode as a stagiaire with Ag2r–La Mondiale in 2010 in the UCI World Tour, while signed to Genesys Wealth Advisers (2008–2010) in the UCI Oceania Tour. He moved to a UCI ProTeam full-time in 2011 for Leopard Trek, before spending a season at both Champion System in 2012, and Argos–Shimano in 2013.

Clarke then moved to the Drapac Professional Cycling team in 2014, as the team moved up to the Professional Continental level. After three seasons with Drapac Professional Cycling, Clarke returned to the World Tour with Cannondale–Drapac, riding with them until the end of 2018. He signed with Trek–Segafredo, for the 2019 and 2020 seasons, returning to the team that he competed for in 2011.

In May 2019, he was named in the startlist for the 2019 Giro d'Italia.

== Major results ==
2008
1st Goulburn to Sydney Classic
2009
5th Time trial, Oceania Road Championships
2010
3rd Overall Tour de Taiwan
4th Time trial, National Road Championships
2012
1st Stage 2 Tour Down Under
1st Prologue Tour of Japan
5th Road race, National Road Championships
8th Rund um Köln
2014
Tour of Iran

1st Points classification
1st Stage 2

1st Stage 1 (ITT) Tour of Japan
1st Prologue Tour de Kumano
2nd Time trial, Oceania Road Championships
5th Time trial, National Road Championships
10th Overall Herald Sun Tour
2015
1st Prologue Herald Sun Tour
2016
Tour de Taiwan

1st Stages 1 & 4

1st Stage 3 Volta a Portugal
1st Prologue Herald Sun Tour
1st Prologue Tour of Austria

=== Grand Tour general classification results timeline ===
Grand Tour	2017	2018	2019
Giro d'Italia	—	—	141
Tour de France	—	—	—
Vuelta a España	157	—	—

Legend
—	Did not compete
DNF	Did not finish
