= Brenton Jones =

Australian cyclist (born 1991)

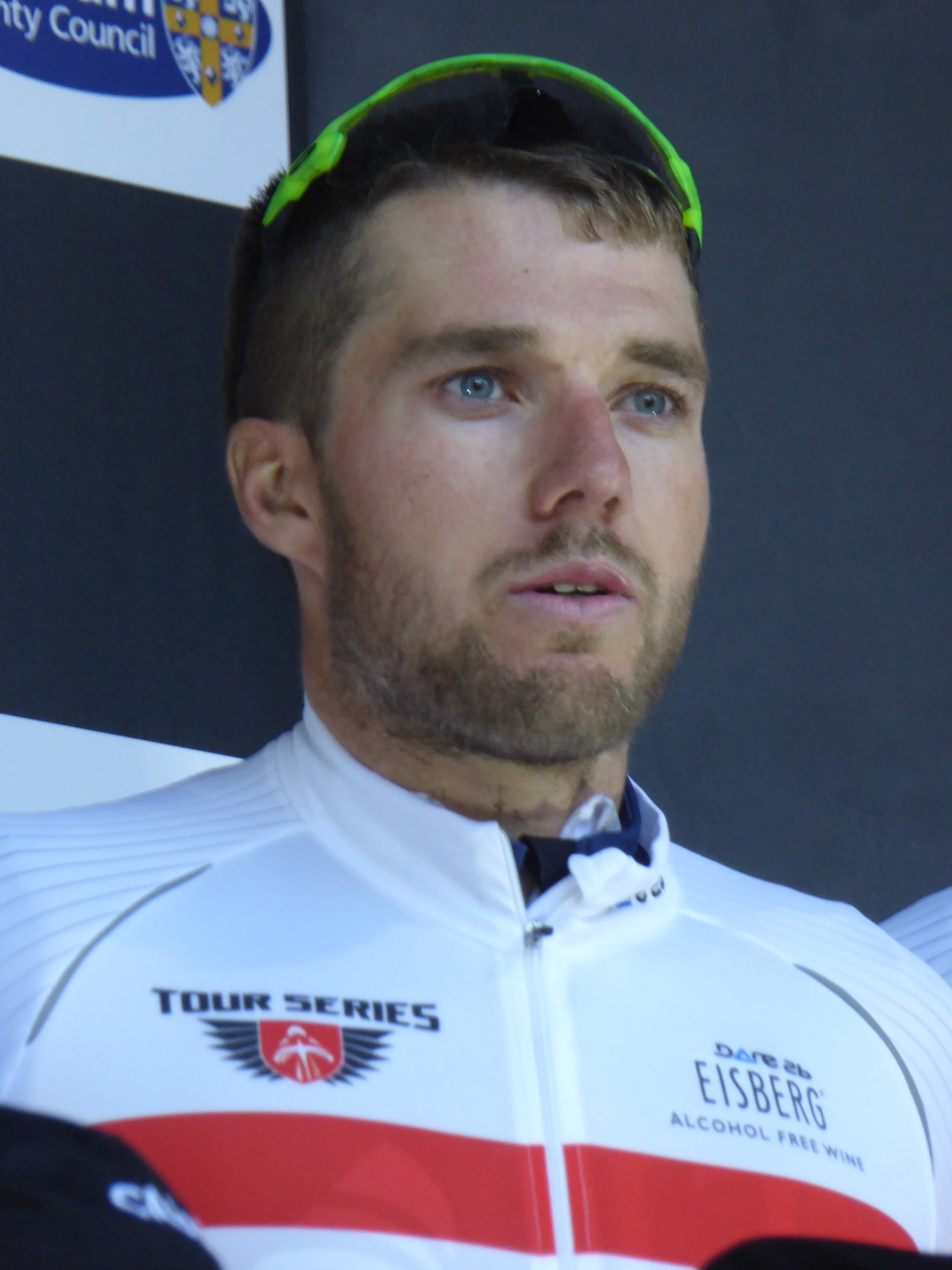
- Jones in 2017.

Personal information
- Full name: Brenton Jones
- Born: 12 December 1991 (age 34) Jindivick, Victoria, Australia
- Height: 182 cm (6 ft 0 in)
- Weight: 81 kg (179 lb)

Cycling career
- Sport: Cycling
- Current team: Inform TMX MAKE
- Discipline: Road
- Role: Rider
- Rider type: Sprinter

Amateur team
- 2021–: Inform TMX MAKE

Professional teams
- 2013–2014: Huon Salmon–Genesys Wealth Advisers
- 2015–2016: Drapac Professional Cycling
- 2017: JLT–Condor
- 2018–2019: Delko–Marseille Provence KTM
- 2020–2021: Canyon dhb p/b Soreen

Brenton Jones (born 12 December 1991) is an Australian racing cyclist, who currently rides for Australian amateur team Inform TMX MAKE.

== Major results ==
2012
10th Time trial, Oceania Under-23 Road Championships
2014
Tour de Singkarak

1st Stages 7 & 9

1st Stage 3 New Zealand Cycle Classic
3rd Road race, Oceania Road Championships
2015
1st Stage 9 Tour of Hainan
1st Stage 1 (ITT) Tour of Japan
2016
Tour de Korea

1st Points classification
1st Stages 4 & 8

2017
1st London Nocturne
Tour Series

1st Round 2 - Stoke-on-Trent
1st Round 7 - Motherwell

1st Stage 5 Tour de Korea
1st Stage 5 Tour de Taiwan
3rd Rutland–Melton CiCLE Classic
2018
1st Stage 2 Tour of Qinghai Lake
4th Rund um Köln
4th Cholet-Pays de la Loire
5th Overall La Tropicale Amissa Bongo

1st Points classification
1st Stages 2 & 5

2019
1st Criterium, National Road Championships
1st Stage 2 Tour of Qinghai Lake
5th Overall Bay Classic Series
7th Overall Tour of Taihu Lake

1st Stage 5

2020
2nd Dorpenomloop Rucphen
2022
2nd Melbourne to Warrnambool Classic
3rd Overall Bay Classic Series
2023
1st Overall Bay Classic Series
1st Damion Drapac ANZAC Day Classic
