= Damien Howson =

Australian road bicycle racer (born 1992)

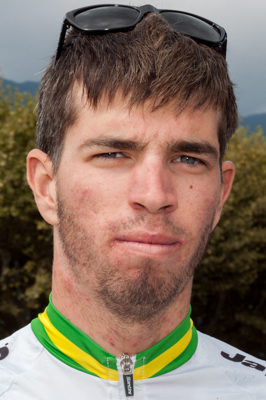
- Howson at the 2013 Tour de l'Avenir

Personal information
- Nickname: Damo
- Born: 13 August 1992 (age 34) Adelaide, South Australia, Australia
- Height: 1.88 m (6 ft 2 in)
- Weight: 68 kg (150 lb)

Cycling career
- Sport: Cycling
- Current team: Pinarello–Q36.5 Pro Cycling Team
- Discipline: Road
- Role: Rider
- Rider type: All-rounder; Domestique

Amateur team
- 2011–2012: Team Jayco–AIS

Professional teams
- 2013–2022: Orica–GreenEDGE
- 2023–: Q36.5 Pro Cycling Team
Medal record
Representing Australia
Gold medal – first place	2013 Florence	Under-23 time trial
Bronze medal – third place	2012 Valkenburg	Under-23 time trial
Representing Orica–GreenEDGE
Men's road bicycle racing
World Championships
Silver medal – second place	2014 Ponferrada	Team time trial

Damien Howson (born 13 August 1992) is an Australian cyclist, who rides for UCI ProTeam Pinarello–Q36.5 Pro Cycling Team.

== Career ==
Howson started his athletic career in basketball, becoming a state champion aged 13. He moved to cycling when South Australian Sports Institute discovered his potential after physiological testing on the state junior basketball team.

He won the world under-23 time trial in 2013, as well as the Oceania Cycling Championships under-23 time trial and road race. He was named in the start list for the 2015 Vuelta a España and the 2016 Giro d'Italia. In 2017 he won the 64th edition of the Herald Sun Tour. In June 2017, he was named to make his debut at the 2017 Tour de France.

== Personal life ==
In 2020 Howson married his high school friend, Georgie Russell at Longview Vineyard near Macclesfield in his home state of South Australia. He is an old scholar of Pedare Christian College.

== Major results ==
2010
1st Trofeo San Rocco
3rd Overall GP Général Patton
4th Overall 3 Giorni Orobica
9th Overall Liège–La Gleize
2011
Oceania Under-23 Road Championships

1st Time trial
4th Road race

1st Team pursuit, National Track Championships
4th Time trial, National Under-23 Road Championships
9th Time trial, UCI Under-23 Road World Championships
9th Chrono Champenois
9th Memorial Davide Fardelli
2012
1st Time trial, Oceania Under-23 Road Championships
2nd Time trial, National Under-23 Road Championships
2nd Memorial Davide Fardelli
3rd Time trial, UCI Under-23 Road World Championships
4th Chrono Champenois
7th Overall Tour Alsace
2013
1st Time trial, UCI Under-23 Road World Championships
1st UCI Oceania Tour
Oceania Under-23 Road Championships

1st Road race
1st Time trial

National Under-23 Road Championships

1st Time trial
2nd Road race

1st Trofeo Alcide Degasperi
2nd Chrono Champenois
3rd Overall Thüringen Rundfahrt der U23

1st Prologue

3rd Trofeo Banca Popolare di Vicenza
5th Giro del Belvedere
7th Gran Premio Palio del Recioto
2014
2nd Team time trial, UCI Road World Championships
3rd Time trial, National Road Championships
2015
5th Time trial, National Road Championships
5th Overall Herald Sun Tour
2016
3rd Overall Herald Sun Tour
4th Time trial, National Road Championships
2017 (2 pro wins)
1st Overall Herald Sun Tour

1st Stage 1

9th GP Miguel Induráin
9th Pro Ötztaler 5500
2018
3rd Overall Herald Sun Tour
4th Overall Colorado Classic
2019
1st Stage 1 (TTT) Tirreno–Adriatico
2nd Overall Settimana Internazionale di Coppi e Bartali

1st Stage 1b (TTT)

10th Overall Herald Sun Tour
2020 (2)
1st Overall Czech Cycling Tour

1st Stages 1 (TTT) & 4

3rd Overall Herald Sun Tour
3rd Overall Tour de Hongrie
2021 (2)
1st Overall Tour de Hongrie

1st Stage 4

2023 (1)
3rd Overall Tour of Britain
4th Overall Vuelta a Asturias

1st Stage 1

4th Overall Vuelta a Burgos
2024
8th Overall Tour de Hongrie
9th Overall Tour Down Under
2025
4th Overall Tour of Oman
10th Overall Giro d'Abruzzo

=== Grand Tour general classification results timeline ===
Grand Tour	2015	2016	2017	2018	2019	2020	2021	2022
Giro d'Italia	—	53	—	—	—	DNF	—	33
Tour de France	—	—	88	DNF	—	—	—	—
Vuelta a España	147	45	—	70	49	—	95	—

Legend
—	Did not compete
DNF	Did not finish
