= Jack Haig (cyclist) =

Australian cyclist (born 1993)

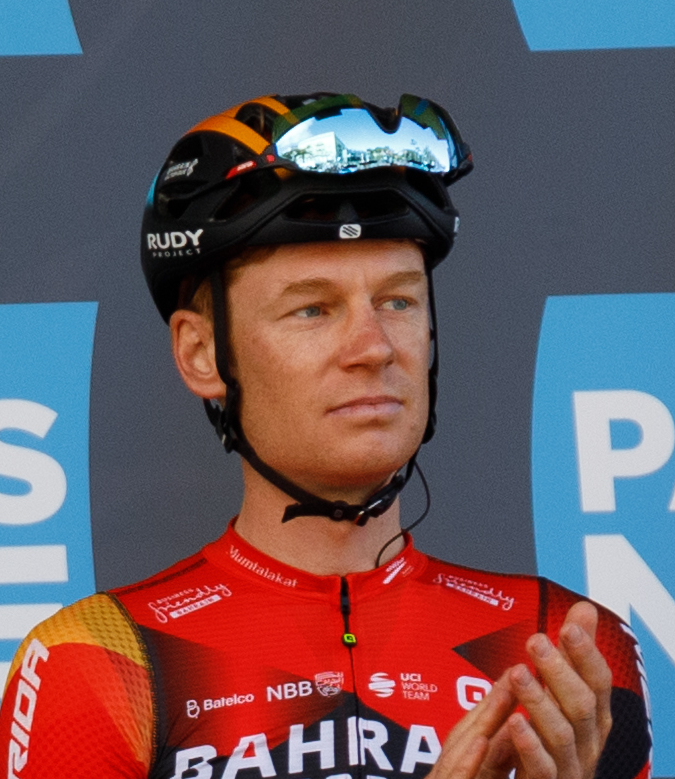
- Haig in 2023

Personal information
- Full name: Jack Haig
- Born: 6 September 1993 (age 33) Southport, Queensland, Australia
- Height: 1.90 m (6 ft 3 in)
- Weight: 70 kg (154 lb)

Cycling career
- Sport: Cycling
- Current team: Netcompany–Ineos
- Disciplines: Road; Mountain biking
- Role: Rider
- Rider type: Climber

Amateur team
- 2015: Jayco–AIS World Tour Academy

Professional teams
- 2013–2014: Huon Salmon–Genesys Wealth Advisers
- 2015: Orica–GreenEDGE (stagiaire)
- 2016–2020: Orica–GreenEDGE
- 2021–2025: Team Bahrain Victorious
- 2026–: Netcompany INEOS

Jack Haig (born 6 September 1993) is an Australian cyclist who competes in the mountain bike and road bicycle racing disciplines of the sport for UCI WorldTeam Netcompany–Ineos.

== Career ==
He won the young rider classification in the 2014 Tour Down Under. He was named in the startlist for the 2016 Vuelta a España. He took his first professional win by winning stage 6 of the 2017 Tour de Pologne. He was named in the startlist for the 2018 Giro d'Italia. He was named in the startlist for the 2019 Tour de France.

In August 2020, Haig signed a three-year contract with Team Bahrain Victorious, from the 2021 season.

In December 2025 INEOS Grenadiers (Netcompany Ineos as of May 2026) announced that Haig would join them from the 2026 and 2027 seasons.

== Major results ==
2012
Tour of Bright

1st Stages 2 & 3

2013
1st Cross-country, National Under-23 MTB Championships
1st Overall Tour of Tasmania

1st Stage 1 (TTT)

2nd Overall Tour of Toowoomba

1st Stage 3 (TTT)

2nd Overall National Capital Tour
3rd Road race, National Under-23 Road Championships
3rd Overall North West Tour

1st Stage 1 (ITT)

3rd Overall Tour of Bright
3rd Tour de Perth
7th Road race, Oceanian Road Championships
2014
1st Overall Tour of Toowoomba

1st Stages 2 & 3 (TTT)

1st Young rider classification, Tour Down Under
2nd Overall Tour Alsace

1st Young rider classification

3rd Overall Herald Sun Tour

1st Young rider classification

3rd Overall Tour de Korea
4th GP Capodarco
7th Gran Premio di Poggiana
2015
2nd Overall Tour de l'Avenir
2nd Gran Premio Palio del Recioto
5th Overall Tour Alsace
5th Gran Premio di Poggiana
9th Overall Giro della Valle d'Aosta
9th Chrono Champenois
2016
2nd Overall Tour of Slovenia

1st Points classification

5th Overall Herald Sun Tour
2017 (1 pro win)
3rd Overall Tour of Slovenia
8th Overall Tour de Pologne

1st Stage 6

9th Giro dell'Emilia
2018
3rd Overall Tour of Utah
2019
3rd Bretagne Classic
3rd Gran Premio Bruno Beghelli
4th Overall Paris–Nice
5th Overall Czech Cycling Tour

1st Stage 1 (TTT)

6th Overall Vuelta a Andalucía
6th Giro di Lombardia
7th Overall Volta a la Comunitat Valenciana
2020 (1)
2nd Overall Vuelta a Andalucía

1st Stage 4

2nd Overall Volta a la Comunitat Valenciana
10th Overall Tirreno–Adriatico
2021
3rd Overall Vuelta a España
5th Overall Critérium du Dauphiné
7th Overall Paris–Nice
7th Overall Tour de la Provence
2022
5th Overall Critérium du Dauphiné
6th Overall Paris–Nice
6th Overall Vuelta a Andalucía
2023
3rd Overall Tour of the Alps
5th Overall Critérium du Dauphiné
10th Overall Paris–Nice
2024
10th Overall Tour Down Under
2025
9th Clàssica Comunitat Valenciana 1969

=== General classification results timeline ===
Grand Tour general classification results
Grand Tour	2016	2017	2018	2019	2020	2021	2022	2023	2024	2025
Giro d'Italia	—	—	36	—	DNF	—	—	19	—	—
Tour de France	—	—	—	38	—	DNF	DNF	28	31	DNF
Vuelta a España	117	21	19	—	—	3	—	—	22	
Major stage race general classification results
Race	2016	2017	2018	2019	2020	2021	2022	2023	2024	2025
Paris–Nice	—	—	—	4	—	7	6	10	58	30
Tirreno–Adriatico	—	—	—	—	10	—	—	—	—	—
Volta a Catalunya	61	—	56	—	NH	—	DNF	DNF	48	—
Tour of the Basque Country	—	—	—	—	NH	—	—	—	—	34
Tour de Romandie	39	22	—	—	NH	67	—	—	—	18
Critérium du Dauphiné	39	31	—	27	27	5	5	5	16	30
Tour de Suisse	—	—	13	—	NH	—	—	—	—	—

Legend
—	Did not compete
DNF	Did not finish
