= Data3–Symantec Racing Team p/b Scody =

Australian cycling team

Data#3-Symantec Racing Team p/b Scody
Team information
- UCI code: DSR
- Registered: Australia
- Founded: 2015
- Discipline: Road
- Status: UCI Continental

Team name history
- 2015–: Data#3-Symantec Racing Team p/b Scody

Data#3-Symantec Racing Team p/b Scody is an Australian UCI Continental cycling team established in 2015.

== Major wins ==
2015
Stage 2 New Zealand Cycle Classic, Craig Evers
Stage 1 (ITT) Tour of Borneo, Craig Evers
