= Joseph Cooper (cyclist) =

New Zealand cyclist (born 1985)

Personal information
- Full name: Joseph Cooper
- Born: 27 December 1985 (age 40) Wellington, New Zealand

Cycling career
- Sport: Cycling
- Discipline: Road
- Role: Rider

Professional teams
- 2007: Team Konica Minolta
- 2009–2010: Subway–Avanti Cycling Team
- 2013–2018: Huon Salmon–Genesys Wealth Advisers
- 2019–2020: Team BridgeLane

Major wins
- One-day races and Classics National Time Trial Championships (2013) National Road Race Championships (2015, 2017)

Joseph Cooper (born 27 December 1985) is a New Zealand professional racing cyclist, who last rode for UCI Continental team Team BridgeLane. He won the New Zealand National Road Race Championships in 2015 and 2017.

== Major results ==
2005
Oceania Under-23 Road Championships

5th Time trial
6th Road race

2007
2nd Time trial, Oceania Road Championships
2008
5th Overall Tour of Southland
2009
2nd Road race, National Road Championships
2010
1st Stage 3 Tour of Southland
2012
1st Mountains classification New Zealand Cycle Classic
10th Overall Tour de Langkawi
2013
1st Time trial, National Road Championships
1st Stage 1 (ITT) New Zealand Cycle Classic
3rd Time trial, Oceania Road Championships
3rd Overall Tour of Borneo
2014
1st Time trial, Oceania Road Championships
2015
National Road Championships

1st Road race
2nd Time trial

1st Prologue New Zealand Cycle Classic
3rd Overall Herald Sun Tour
2016
2nd Time trial, Oceania Road Championships
3rd Time trial, National Road Championships
2017
1st Road race, National Road Championships
1st Overall New Zealand Cycle Classic
1st Stage 9 Tour of Hainan
2nd Overall Tour of China I

1st Stages 3 & 4 (ITT)

5th Time trial, Oceania Road Championships
2018
1st Stage 4 Tour de Korea
1st Mountains classification Rhône-Alpes Isère Tour
