= Neil Van der Ploeg =

Australian cyclist

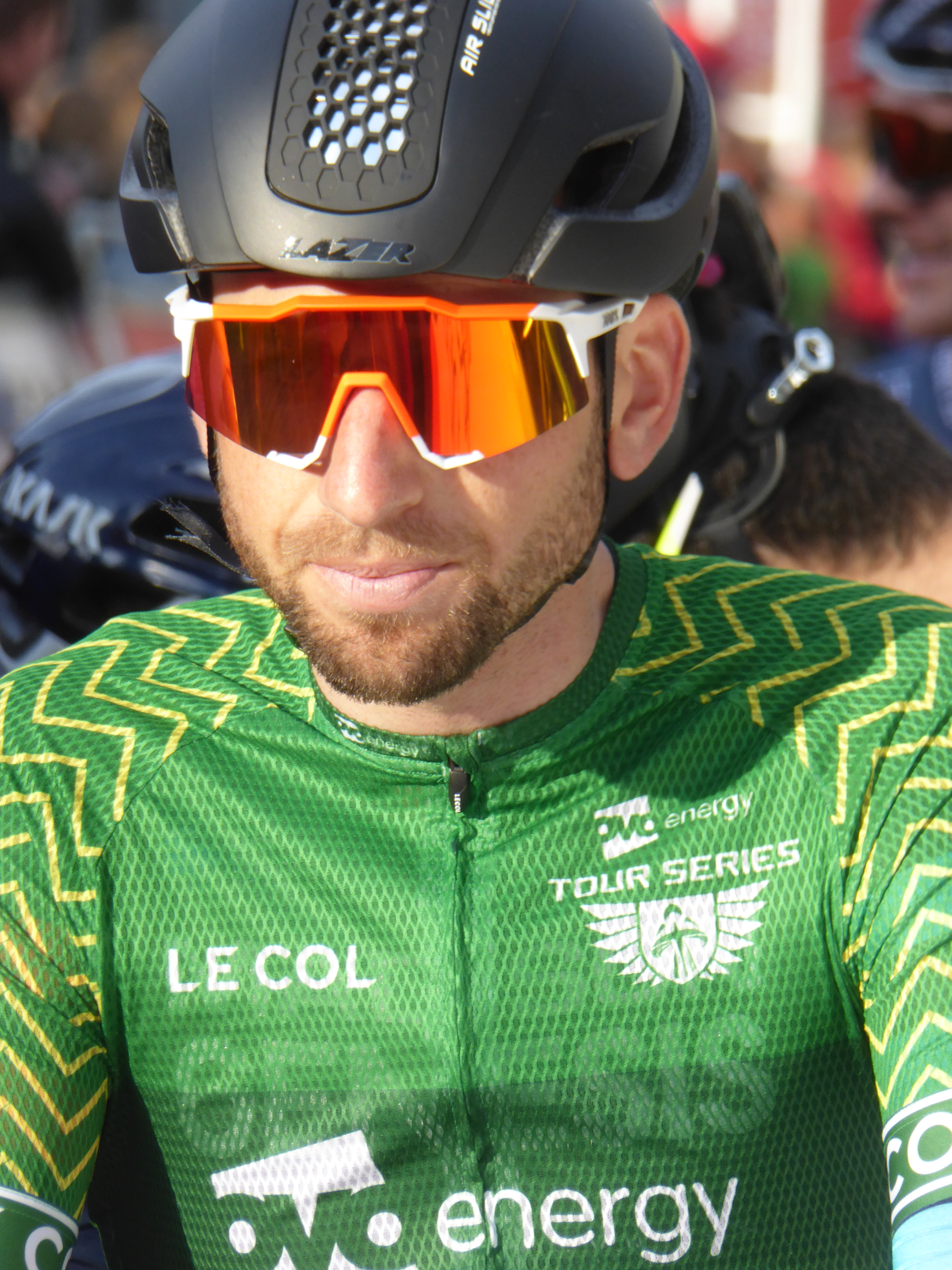
- Van der Ploeg in 2018

Personal information
- Full name: Neil Van der Ploeg
- Born: 23 September 1987 (age 39)

Cycling career
- Sport: Cycling
- Discipline: Road
- Role: Rider; Directeur sportif

Amateur teams
- 2011–2013: Search2retain
- 2020–2021: Albury Wodonga Panthers Cycling Club

Professional teams
- 2014–2017: Avanti Racing Team
- 2018: Madison Genesis
- 2019: Team BridgeLane

Managerial team
- 2020: Roxsolt Attaquer

Neil Van der Ploeg (born 23 September 1987) is an Australian cyclist, who most recently rode for Australian amateur team Albury Wodonga Panthers Cycling Club. Van der Ploeg also rode professionally between 2014 and 2019 for the IsoWhey Sports SwissWellness, Madison Genesis and Team BridgeLane teams, and has worked as a directeur sportif for UCI Women's Continental Team Roxsolt Attaquer.

== Major results ==
2013
4th Road race, Oceania Road Championships
4th Road race, National Road Championships
2014
3rd Overall Tour of China I
5th Overall Herald Sun Tour
8th Road race, Oceania Road Championships
2015
Tour de Kumano

1st Points classification
1st Prologue & Stage 1

3rd Road race, National Road Championships
4th Overall Tour of China I

1st Stage 2 (ITT)

7th Overall Tour de Korea
9th Road race, Oceania Road Championships
2017
4th Midden–Brabant Poort Omloop
8th Road race, Oceania Road Championships
