= Bennelong SwissWellness Cycling Team p/b Cervelo =

Australian cycling team

Team information
- UCI code: IWS
- Registered: Australia
- Founded: 2000
- Disbanded: 2018; Merged with Mobius BridgeLane to form Team BridgeLane.
- Discipline: Road
- Status: UCI Continental
- Bicycles: Cervelo

Key personnel
- Team managers: Andrew Christie-Johnson; Steve Price

Team name history
- 2000–2009 2010–2012 2013 2014–2015 2016 2017 2018: Praties; Genesys Wealth Advisers; Huon Salmon-Genesys Wealth Advisers; Avanti Racing Team; Avanti IsoWhey Sports; IsoWhey Sports SwissWellness; Bennelong SwissWellness Cycling Team p/b Cervelo

Bennelong SwissWellness Cycling Team p/b Cervelo (UCI team code: IWS) was an Australian UCI Continental cycling team focusing on road bicycle racing. Based in Tasmania since its establishment in 2000, the team's original title sponsor was a Tasmanian restaurant chain, Praties, but Genesys Wealth Advisers, an Australian financial planning network, has taken over this role in 2010. The team was founded by Andrew Christie-Johnson and Steve Price.

In 2014 team was the top ranked team in Australia's National Road Series (NRS). It has competed overseas in the Tour of Qinghai Lake (2.HC), Tour de Taiwan (2.2) and the Herald Sun Tour (2.1).

The team was invited to compete in the Team Time Trial of the 2013 UCI Road World Championships as the Oceania representative.

For the 2016 season the team secured the sponsorship of sports nutrition company, IsoWhey Sports.

For the 2017 season the team merged with SwissWellness, securing the teams immediate future after Avanti announced they would stop sponsoring the team in October 2016

The 2018 season saw Bennelong Funds Management secure primary naming rights of the team.

== Team roster ==
As at 31 December 2018

Rider	Date of birth
Cameron Bayly (AUS)	11 October 1990 (aged 28)
Scott Bowden (AUS)	4 April 1995 (aged 23)
Alastair Christie-Johnston (AUS)	29 March 1998 (aged 20)
Joseph Cooper (NZL)	27 December 1985 (aged 33)
Sam Crome (AUS)	16 December 1993 (aged 25)
Brendon Davids (RSA)	4 February 1993 (aged 25)
Nathan Elliott (AUS)	15 December 1990 (aged 28)
Michael Freiberg (AUS)	10 October 1990 (aged 28)
Anthony Giacoppo (AUS)	13 May 1986 (aged 32)
Chris Harper (AUS)	23 November 1994 (aged 24)

Rider	Date of birth
Sean Lake (AUS)	6 December 1991 (aged 27)
Jason Lea (AUS)	26 June 1996 (aged 22)
Alexander Porter (AUS)	13 May 1996 (aged 22)
Timothy Roe (AUS)	28 October 1989 (aged 29)
Scott Sunderland (AUS)	16 March 1988 (aged 30)
Dylan Sunderland (AUS)	26 February 1996 (aged 22)
Ayden Toovey (AUS)	8 November 1995 (aged 23)
Steele Von Hoff (AUS)	31 December 1987 (aged 31)
Tristan Ward (AUS)	18 August 1995 (aged 23)

== Major wins ==
2008
Stage 2 Tour of Wellington, Richie Porte
2009
Stage 2 Giro della Regione Friuli Venezia Giulia, Richie Porte
2010
Stage 4 Tour of Wellington, Joel Pearson
Stage 1 Tour de Taiwan, Will Clarke
2011
Overall Herald Sun Tour, Nathan Haas
Japan Cup, Nathan Haas
2012
Stage 1 New Zealand Cycle Classic, Campbell Flakemore
Stages 1 & 3 Tour de Taiwan, Anthony Giacoppo
Stages 2 & 4 Tour of Borneo, Nathan Earle
Stage 3 Tour of Borneo, Anthony Giacoppo
Prologue Tour de Kumano, Anthony Giacoppo
2013
Stage 1 Herald Sun Tour, Aaron Donnelly
Stage 3 Herald Sun Tour, Nathan Earle
Overall New Zealand Cycle Classic, Nathan Earle

Stage 1 (ITT), Joseph Cooper
Stages 2 & 4, Nathan Earle

Stage 2 Tour de Taiwan, Nathan Earle
Stage 4 Tour of Japan, Ben Dyball
Stage 5 Tour of Japan, Nathan Earle
Stage 2 Jelajah Malaysia, Aaron Donnelly
Stage 4 Jelajah Malaysia, Anthony Giacoppo
2014
Stage 3 New Zealand Cycle Classic, Brenton Jones
Stages 7 & 9 Tour de Singkarak, Brenton Jones
2015
Overall New Zealand Cycle Classic, Taylor Gunman

Prologue, Joseph Cooper
Stage 1, Jason Christie

Stage 4 Herald Sun Tour, Patrick Bevin
The REV Classic, Patrick Bevin
Stage 2 Tour de Taiwan, Patrick Bevin
Prologue & Stage 1 Tour de Kumano, Neil Van der Ploeg
Stage 4 Tour de Korea, Patrick Bevin
Prologue Tour of China I, Neil Van der Ploeg
Tour de Okinawa, Jason Christie
2016
Overall New Zealand Cycle Classic, Ben O'Connor

Stage 4, Ben O'Connor

Overall Tour de Taiwan, Robbie Hucker

Stage 5, Robbie Hucker

Stages 1 & 3 Tour of Japan, Anthony Giacoppo
Stage 8 Tour of Japan, Sam Crome
2017
Overall New Zealand Cycle Classic, Joseph Cooper

Stage 1, Tim Roe
Stage 2, Sam Crome

Stage 1 Tour de Langkawi, Scott Sunderland
Stage 3 Tour de Korea, Scott Sunderland
Prologue & Stage 5 Tour de Hongrie, Scott Sunderland
Stages 3 & 4 (ITT) Tour of China I, Joseph Cooper
2018
Stage 4 Herald Sun Tour, Sam Crome
Stage 4 Tour de Taiwan, Cameron Bayly
Commonwealth Games Road Race, Steele Von Hoff
Young rider classification Tour of Japan, Chris Harper
Stage 4 Tour de Korea, Joseph Cooper
Prologue & Stage 2 Tour of China II, Anthony Giacoppo

== World, Continental & National Champions ==
2013
New Zealand Time Trial, Joseph Cooper
2014
New Zealand Time Trial, Taylor Gunman
Oceania Time Trial, Joseph Cooper
World U23 Time Trial, Campbell Flakemore
2015
New Zealand Road Race, Joseph Cooper
2016
Oceania Time Trial, Sean Lake
Oceania Road Race, Sean Lake
2017
New Zealand Road Race, Joseph Cooper
2018
Oceania Road Race, Chris Harper
Australia Track (Madison), Alexander Porter

== National Road Series ==
2012
Stage 3 Mersey Valley Tour, Nathan Earle
Stage 2 North Western Tour, Anthony Giacoppo
Stage 3 Tour of Gippsland, Anthony Giacoppo
Overall Tour of the Great South Coast, Anthony Giacoppo

Stages 1 & 3, Brenton Jones
Stage 7, Anthony Giacoppo
Stage 9, Campbell Flakemore

Stages 2, 3 & 5 Tour of the Murray River, Anthony Giacoppo
Stages 4 & 14 Tour of the Murray River, Joel Pearson
Stage 9 Tour of the Murray River, Campbell Flakemore
Stage 1 (TTT), Tour of Tasmania
Stage 8, Campbell Flakemore
2013
Overall Woodside Tour de Perth, Joseph Cooper

Stage 2 (ITT), Joseph Cooper
Stage 3, Nathan Earle

Overall Battle on the Border, Jack Haig

Stage 1, Jack Haig
Stage 2, Anthony Giacoppo
Stage 3 (ITT), Joseph Cooper

Overall Tour of Toowoomba, Nathan Earle

Stage 2, Nathan Earle
Stage 3 (TTT)

Overall Santos North West Tour, Nathan Earle

Stage 1 (ITT), Jack Haig
Stage 4, Nathan Earle

Stages 1, 4 & 6 Tour of Gippsland, Anthony Giacoppo
Stages 3, 4 & 5 Tour of the Great South West, Anthony Giacoppo
2014
Overall Tour de Perth, Joseph Cooper

Stage 3, Joseph Cooper

Stage 2 Adelaide Tour, Brenton Jones
Stage 4 Adelaide Tour, Jack Beckinsale
Overall Battle on the Border, Joseph Cooper

Stage 1, Mark O'Brien
Stage 3, Joseph Cooper
Stage 4, Scott Law

Overall Tour of Toowoomba, Jack Haig

Stages 1 & 5, Neil van der Ploeg
Stage 2, Jack Haig
Stage 3, TTT

Stages 1, 3 & 4 Tour of the Murray River, Brenton Jones
Overall Tour of the Great South Coast, Brenton Jones

Stages 3 & 5, Brenton Jones

Stage 1 Tour of Gippsland, Scott Law
