= 2010 Tour de Langkawi, Stage 1 to Stage 7 =

Cycling race stages

The 2010 Tour de Langkawi was the 15th edition of the Tour de Langkawi, a cycling stage race that takes place in Malaysia. It began on 1 March in Kota Bharu and ended on 7 March in Merdeka Square, Kuala Lumpur. The race comprises 7 stages, covering 1013.9 kilometres.

== Stage 1 ==
1 March 2010 — Kota Bharu to Kuala Berang, 174.5 km (108.4 mi)

	Rider	Team	Time
1	Michael Matthews (AUS)	Team Jayco–Skins	04h 22' 53"
2	Vidal Celis (ESP)	Footon–Servetto–Fuji	s.t.
3	Ruslan Tleubayev (KAZ)	Kazakhstan	s.t.
4	Anuar Manan (MAS)	Geumsan Ginseng Asia	s.t.
5	Johann Rabie (RSA)	South Africa	s.t.
6	René Haselbacher (AUT)	Vorarlberg–Corratec	s.t.
7	Markus Eibegger (AUT)	Footon–Servetto–Fuji	s.t.
8	Tobias Erler (GER)	Tabriz Petrochemical Team	s.t.
9	Zach Bell (CAN)	Kelly Benefit Strategies	s.t.
10	Zamri Salleh (MAS)	Malaysia	s.t.

== Stage 2 ==
2 March 2010 — Kuala Terengganu to Chukai, 182.3 km (113.3 mi)

	Rider	Team	Time
1	Jay Thomson (RSA)	South Africa	04h 06' 54"
2	Tobias Erler (GER)	Tabriz Petrochemical Team	s.t.
3	David Pell (AUS)	Drapac–Porsche Cycling	s.t.
4	Michael Matthews (AUS)	Team Jayco–Skins	s.t.
5	Anuar Manan (MAS)	Geumsan Ginseng Asia	s.t.
6	René Weissinger (GER)	Vorarlberg–Corratec	s.t.
7	Vidal Celis (ESP)	Footon–Servetto–Fuji	s.t.
8	Ruslan Tleubayev (KAZ)	Kazakhstan	s.t.
9	Adiq Husainie Othman (MAS)	Drapac–Porsche Cycling	s.t.
10	Christoff Van Heerden (RSA)	South Africa	s.t.

== Stage 3 ==
3 March 2010 — Pekan to Mersing, 145.6 km (90.5 mi)

	Rider	Team	Time
1	Michael Matthews (AUS)	Team Jayco–Skins	03h 16' 27"
2	Alex Candelario (USA)	Kelly Benefit Strategies	s.t.
3	Dmytro Grabovskyy (UKR)	ISD–NERI	s.t.
4	Anuar Manan (MAS)	Geumsan Ginseng Asia	s.t.
5	René Haselbacher (AUT)	Vorarlberg–Corratec	s.t.
6	Vidal Celis (ESP)	Footon–Servetto–Fuji	s.t.
7	Hossein Nateghi (IRI)	Azad University Iran	s.t.
8	Kim Yeong-Uk (KOR)	Geumsan Ginseng Asia	s.t.
9	Tobias Erler (GER)	Tabriz Petrochemical Team	s.t.
10	Kazuhiro Mori (JPN)	Aisan Racing Team	s.t.

== Stage 4 ==
4 March 2010 — Mersing to Parit Sulong, 163.5 km (101.6 mi)

	Rider	Team	Time
1	Taiji Nishitani (JPN)	Aisan Racing Team	03h 50' 11"
2	Michael Matthews (AUS)	Team Jayco–Skins	s.t.
3	Vidal Celis (ESP)	Footon–Servetto–Fuji	s.t.
4	Kazuhiro Mori (JPN)	Aisan Racing Team	s.t.
5	René Haselbacher (AUT)	Vorarlberg–Corratec	s.t.
6	Anuar Manan (MAS)	Geumsan Ginseng Asia	s.t.
7	Hossein Nateghi (IRI)	Azad University Iran	s.t.
8	Dennis Pohl (GER)	Giant Asia Racing Team	s.t.
9	René Weissinger (GER)	Vorarlberg–Corratec	s.t.
10	Dmytro Grabovskyy (UKR)	ISD–NERI	s.t.

== Stage 5 ==
5 March 2010 — Muar to Port Dickson, 111.5 km (69.3 mi)

	Rider	Team	Time
1	Anuar Manan (MAS)	Geumsan Ginseng Asia	02h 23' 11"
2	Vidal Celis (ESP)	Footon–Servetto–Fuji	s.t.
3	René Haselbacher (AUT)	Vorarlberg–Corratec	s.t.
4	Ruslan Tleubayev (KAZ)	Kazakhstan	s.t.
5	Alex Candelario (USA)	Kelly Benefit Strategies	s.t.
6	Johann Rabie (RSA)	South Africa	s.t.
7	Christoff Van Heerden (RSA)	South Africa	s.t.
8	Michael Matthews (AUS)	Team Jayco–Skins	s.t.
9	Ahmad Haidar Anuawar (MAS)	Marco Polo	s.t.
10	Dmytro Grabovskyy (UKR)	ISD–NERI	s.t.

== Stage 6 ==
6 March 2010 — Putrajaya to Genting Highlands, 102.8 km (63.9 mi)

	Rider	Team	Time
1	José Rujano (VEN)	ISD–NERI	03h 04' 21"
2	Gong Hyo-Suk (KOR)	Seoul Cycling Team	+ 02' 11"
3	Hossein Askari (IRI)	Tabriz Petrochemical Team	+ 02' 36"
4	Peter McDonald (AUS)	Drapac–Porsche Cycling	+ 03' 22"
5	Amir Zargari (IRI)	Azad University Iran	s.t.
6	Alexandr Shushemoin (KAZ)	Kazakhstan	+ 04' 27"
7	Mathias Brändle (AUT)	Footon–Servetto–Fuji	+ 04' 52"
8	Markus Eibegger (AUT)	Footon–Servetto–Fuji	s.t.
9	Ghader Mizbani (IRI)	Tabriz Petrochemical Team	+ 05' 02"
10	Ahad Kazemi (IRI)	Tabriz Petrochemical Team	+ 05' 36"

== Stage 7 ==
7 March 2010 — Kuala Kubu Bharu to Dataran Merdeka, 133.7 km (83.1 mi)

	Rider	Team	Time
1	Stuart Shaw (AUS)	Drapac–Porsche Cycling	03h 01' 00"
2	Vidal Celis (ESP)	Footon–Servetto–Fuji	s.t.
3	René Haselbacher (AUT)	Vorarlberg–Corratec	s.t.
4	Anuar Manan (MAS)	Geumsan Ginseng Asia	s.t.
5	Ruslan Tleubayev (KAZ)	Kazakhstan	s.t.
6	Tobias Erler (GER)	Tabriz Petrochemical Team	s.t.
7	Alex Candelario (USA)	Kelly Benefit Strategies	s.t.
8	Pierpaolo De Negri (ITA)	ISD–NERI	s.t.
9	Hossein Nateghi (IRI)	Azad University Iran	s.t.
10	Richard Lang (AUS)	Team Jayco–Skins	s.t.
