= 2010 Tour de Langkawi =

2009–10 UCI Asia Tour, race 15 of 34

Race details
- Dates: 1–7 March 2010
- Stages: 7
- Distance: 1,013.9 km (630.0 mi)
- Winning time: 24h 07' 58"

Results
Jersey awarded to the overall winner	Winner	José Rujano (VEN)	(ISD–NERI)
	Second	Gong Hyo-Suk (KOR)	(Seoul Cycling Team)
	Third	Hossein Askari (IRI)	(Tabriz Petrochemical Team)
Jersey awarded to the points classification winner	Points	Anuar Manan (MAS)	(Geumsan Ginseng Asia)
Jersey awarded to the mountains classification winner	Mountains	Peter McDonald (AUS)	(Drapac–Porsche Cycling)
	Team	Tabriz Petrochemical Team	

The 2010 Tour de Langkawi was the 15th edition of the Tour de Langkawi, a cycling stage race that took place in Malaysia. The race began on 1 March in Kota Bharu and ended on 7 March in Merdeka Square, Kuala Lumpur. The race was sanctioned by the Union Cycliste Internationale (UCI) as a 2.HC (hors category) race on the 2009–10 UCI Asia Tour calendar.

José Rujano of Venezuela became the overall winner of the race, followed by Gong Hyo-Suk of South Korea second and Hossein Askari of Iran third. Anuar Manan representing Geumsan Ginseng Asia made history when he became the first Malaysian cyclist to win a stage, which he won the Stage 5. Manan also became the first Malaysian cyclist to win the points classification. Peter McDonald won the mountains classification category. Tabriz Petrochemical Team was the leader of team classification of the race.

== Teams ==
20 teams accepted invitations to participate in the 2010 Tour de Langkawi.

- Footon–Servetto–Fuji
- ISD–NERI
- Vorarlberg–Corratec
- Drapac–Porsche Cycling
- Tabriz Petrochemical Team
- Seoul Cycling Team
- Marco Polo
- Aisan Racing Team
- CKT TMIT–Champion System
- LeTua Cycling Team
- Geumsan Ginseng Asia
- Team Jayco–Skins
- Azad University Iran
- Giant Asia Racing Team
- Kelly Benefit Strategies
- South Africa ‡
- Kazakhstan ‡
- Malaysia ‡
- Polygon Sweet Nice
- Thailand ‡

‡: National teams

== Stages ==
The cyclists competed in 7 stages, covering a distance of 1,013.9 kilometres.

Stage	Date	Course	Distance	Stage result		
Stage	Date	Course	Distance	Winner	Second	Third
1	1 March	Kota Bharu to Kuala Berang	174.5 km (108.4 mi)	Michael Matthews (AUS); Team Jayco–Skins	Vidal Celis (ESP); Footon–Servetto–Fuji	Ruslan Tleubayev (KAZ); Kazakhstan
2	2 March	Kuala Terengganu to Chukai	182.3 km (113.3 mi)	Jay Thomson (RSA); South Africa	Tobias Erler (GER); Tabriz Petrochemical Team	David Pell (AUS); Drapac–Porsche Cycling
3	3 March	Pekan to Mersing	145.6 km (90.5 mi)	Michael Matthews (AUS); Team Jayco–Skins	Alex Candelario (USA); Kelly Benefit Strategies	Dmytro Grabovskyy (UKR); ISD–NERI
4	4 March	Mersing to Parit Sulong	163.5 km (101.6 mi)	Taiji Nishitani (JPN); Aisan Racing Team	Michael Matthews (AUS); Team Jayco–Skins	Vidal Celis (ESP); Footon–Servetto–Fuji
5	5 March	Muar to Port Dickson	111.5 km (69.3 mi)	Anuar Manan (MAS); Geumsan Ginseng Asia	Vidal Celis (ESP); Footon–Servetto–Fuji	René Haselbacher (AUT); Vorarlberg–Corratec
6	6 March	Putrajaya to Genting Highlands	102.8 km (63.9 mi)	José Rujano (VEN); ISD–NERI	Gong Hyo-Suk (KOR); Seoul Cycling Team	Hossein Askari (IRI); Tabriz Petrochemical Team
7	7 March	Kuala Kubu Bharu to Merdeka Square, Kuala Lumpur	133.7 km (83.1 mi)	Stuart Shaw (AUS); Drapac–Porsche Cycling	Vidal Celis (ESP); Footon–Servetto–Fuji	René Haselbacher (AUT); Vorarlberg–Corratec

== Classification leadership ==
Stage	Winner	General classification	Points classification	Mountains classification	Asian rider classification	Team classification	Asian team classification
1	Michael Matthews	Michael Matthews	Anuar Manan	Peter McDonald	Anuar Manan	Footon–Servetto–Fuji	Malaysia
2	Jay Thomson	Tobias Erler	Anuar Manan	Peter McDonald	Anuar Manan	South Africa	Malaysia
3	Michael Matthews	Tobias Erler	Anuar Manan	Peter McDonald	Anuar Manan	South Africa	Geumsan Ginseng Asia
4	Taiji Nishitani	Tobias Erler	Michael Matthews	Peter McDonald	Anuar Manan	South Africa	Geumsan Ginseng Asia
5	Anuar Manan	Tobias Erler	Anuar Manan	Peter McDonald	Anuar Manan	South Africa	Malaysia
6	José Rujano	José Rujano	Anuar Manan	José Rujano	Gong Hyo-Suk	Tabriz Petrochemical Team	Tabriz Petrochemical Team
7	Stuart Shaw	José Rujano	Anuar Manan	Peter McDonald	Gong Hyo-Suk	Tabriz Petrochemical Team	Tabriz Petrochemical Team
Final		José Rujano	Anuar Manan	Peter McDonald	Gong Hyo-Suk	Tabriz Petrochemical Team	Tabriz Petrochemical Team

== Final standings ==
=== General classification ===
	Rider	Team	Time
1	José Rujano (VEN)	ISD–NERI	24h 07' 58"
2	Gong Hyo-Suk (KOR)	Seoul Cycling Team	+ 02' 07"
3	Hossein Askari (IRI)	Tabriz Petrochemical Team	+ 02' 39"
4	Peter McDonald (AUS)	Drapac–Porsche Cycling	+ 03' 21"
5	Amir Zargari (IRI)	Azad University Iran	+ 04' 13"
6	Markus Eibegger (AUT)	Footon–Servetto–Fuji	+ 04' 54"
7	Alexandr Shushemoin (KAZ)	Kazakhstan	+ 04' 54"
8	Mathias Brändle (AUT)	Footon–Servetto–Fuji	+ 04' 58"
9	Ghader Mizbani (IRI)	Tabriz Petrochemical Team	+ 05' 10"
10	Ahad Kazemi (IRI)	Tabriz Petrochemical Team	+ 05' 46"

=== Points classification ===
	Rider	Team	Points
1	Anuar Manan (MAS)	Geumsan Ginseng Asia	103
2	Michael Matthews (AUS)	Team Jayco–Skins	82
3	Vidal Celis (ESP)	Footon–Servetto–Fuji	77
4	René Haselbacher (AUT)	Vorarlberg–Corratec	60
5	Tobias Erler (GER)	Tabriz Petrochemical Team	56

=== Mountains classification ===
	Rider	Team	Points
1	Peter McDonald (AUS)	Drapac–Porsche Cycling	29
2	José Rujano (VEN)	ISD–NERI	26
3	Gong Hyo-Suk (KOR)	Seoul Cycling Team	24
4	Hossein Askari (IRI)	Tabriz Petrochemical Team	16
5	Mohd Nur Rizuan Zainal (MAS)	Malaysia	14

=== Asian rider classification ===
	Rider	Team	Time
1	Gong Hyo-Suk (KOR)	Seoul Cycling Team	24h 10' 05"
2	Hossein Askari (IRI)	Tabriz Petrochemical Team	+ 32"
3	Amir Zargari (IRI)	Azad University Iran	+ 02' 06"
4	Alexandr Shushemoin (KAZ)	Kazakhstan	+ 02' 47"
5	Ghader Mizbani (IRI)	Tabriz Petrochemical Team	+ 03' 03"
6	Ahad Kazemi (IRI)	Tabriz Petrochemical Team	+ 03' 39"
7	Tonton Susanto (INA)	Azad University Iran	+ 03' 59"
8	Andrey Mizurov (KAZ)	Tabriz Petrochemical Team	+ 04' 52"
9	Youm Jung-Hwan (KOR)	Seoul Cycling Team	+ 05' 33"
10	Ruslan Tleubayev (KAZ)	Kazakhstan	+ 05' 41"

=== Team classification ===
	Team	Time
1	Tabriz Petrochemical Team	72h 34' 11"
2	ISD–NERI	+ 04' 49"
3	Footon–Servetto–Fuji	+ 06' 59"
4	Azad University Iran	+ 07' 26"
5	South Africa	+ 10' 49"
6	Drapac–Porsche Cycling	+ 10' 57"
7	Kazakhstan	+11' 14"
8	Seoul Cycling Team	+ 12' 14"
9	Giant Asia Racing Team	+ 19' 31"
10	LeTua Cycling Team	+ 23' 24"

=== Asian team classification ===
	Team	Time
1	Tabriz Petrochemical Team	72h 37' 22"
2	Azad University Iran	+ 04' 15"
3	Kazakhstan	+ 08' 03"
4	Seoul Cycling Team	+ 09' 03"
5	Aisan Racing Team	+ 22' 47"
6	Malaysia	+ 25' 56"
7	Geumsan Ginseng Asia	+ 29' 22"
8	CKT TMIT–Champion System	+ 30' 52"
9	Polygon Sweet Nice	+ 40' 32"
10	Giant Asia Racing Team	+ 41' 12"

== Stage results ==
=== Stage 1 ===
1 March 2010 — Kota Bharu to Kuala Berang, 174.5 km (108.4 mi),

	Rider	Team	Time
1	Michael Matthews (AUS)	Team Jayco–Skins	04h 22' 53"
2	Vidal Celis (ESP)	Footon–Servetto–Fuji	s.t.
3	Ruslan Tleubayev (KAZ)	Kazakhstan	s.t.
4	Anuar Manan (MAS)	Geumsan Ginseng Asia	s.t.
5	Johann Rabie (RSA)	South Africa	s.t.
6	René Haselbacher (AUT)	Vorarlberg–Corratec	s.t.
7	Markus Eibegger (AUT)	Footon–Servetto–Fuji	s.t.
8	Tobias Erler (GER)	Tabriz Petrochemical Team	s.t.
9	Zach Bell (CAN)	Kelly Benefit Strategies	s.t.
10	Zamri Salleh (MAS)	Malaysia	s.t.

=== Stage 2 ===
2 March 2010 — Kuala Terengganu to Chukai, 182.3 km (113.3 mi)

	Rider	Team	Time
1	Jay Thomson (RSA)	South Africa	04h 06' 54"
2	Tobias Erler (GER)	Tabriz Petrochemical Team	s.t.
3	David Pell (AUS)	Drapac–Porsche Cycling	s.t.
4	Michael Matthews (AUS)	Team Jayco–Skins	s.t.
5	Anuar Manan (MAS)	Geumsan Ginseng Asia	s.t.
6	René Weissinger (GER)	Vorarlberg–Corratec	s.t.
7	Vidal Celis (ESP)	Footon–Servetto–Fuji	s.t.
8	Ruslan Tleubayev (KAZ)	Kazakhstan	s.t.
9	Adiq Husainie Othman (MAS)	Drapac–Porsche Cycling	s.t.
10	Christoff Van Heerden (RSA)	South Africa	s.t.

=== Stage 3 ===
3 March 2010 — Pekan to Mersing, 145.6 km (90.5 mi)

	Rider	Team	Time
1	Michael Matthews (AUS)	Team Jayco–Skins	03h 16' 27"
2	Alex Candelario (USA)	Kelly Benefit Strategies	s.t.
3	Dmytro Grabovskyy (UKR)	ISD–NERI	s.t.
4	Anuar Manan (MAS)	Geumsan Ginseng Asia	s.t.
5	René Haselbacher (AUT)	Vorarlberg–Corratec	s.t.
6	Vidal Celis (ESP)	Footon–Servetto–Fuji	s.t.
7	Hossein Nateghi (IRI)	Azad University Iran	s.t.
8	Kim Yeong-Uk (KOR)	Geumsan Ginseng Asia	s.t.
9	Tobias Erler (GER)	Tabriz Petrochemical Team	s.t.
10	Kazuhiro Mori (JPN)	Aisan Racing Team	s.t.

=== Stage 4 ===
4 March 2010 — Mersing to Parit Sulong, 163.5 km (101.6 mi)

	Rider	Team	Time
1	Taiji Nishitani (JPN)	Aisan Racing Team	03h 50' 11"
2	Michael Matthews (AUS)	Team Jayco–Skins	s.t.
3	Vidal Celis (ESP)	Footon–Servetto–Fuji	s.t.
4	Kazuhiro Mori (JPN)	Aisan Racing Team	s.t.
5	René Haselbacher (AUT)	Vorarlberg–Corratec	s.t.
6	Anuar Manan (MAS)	Geumsan Ginseng Asia	s.t.
7	Hossein Nateghi (IRI)	Azad University Iran	s.t.
8	Dennis Pohl (GER)	Giant Asia Racing Team	s.t.
9	René Weissinger (GER)	Vorarlberg–Corratec	s.t.
10	Dmytro Grabovskyy (UKR)	ISD–NERI	s.t.

=== Stage 5 ===
5 March 2010 — Muar to Port Dickson, 111.5 km (69.3 mi)

	Rider	Team	Time
1	Anuar Manan (MAS)	Geumsan Ginseng Asia	02h 23' 11"
2	Vidal Celis (ESP)	Footon–Servetto–Fuji	s.t.
3	René Haselbacher (AUT)	Vorarlberg–Corratec	s.t.
4	Ruslan Tleubayev (KAZ)	Kazakhstan	s.t.
5	Alex Candelario (USA)	Kelly Benefit Strategies	s.t.
6	Johann Rabie (RSA)	South Africa	s.t.
7	Christoff Van Heerden (RSA)	South Africa	s.t.
8	Michael Matthews (AUS)	Team Jayco–Skins	s.t.
9	Ahmad Haidar Anuawar (MAS)	Marco Polo	s.t.
10	Dmytro Grabovskyy (UKR)	ISD–NERI	s.t.

=== Stage 6 ===
6 March 2010 — Putrajaya to Genting Highlands, 102.8 km (63.9 mi)

	Rider	Team	Time
1	José Rujano (VEN)	ISD–NERI	03h 04' 21"
2	Gong Hyo-Suk (KOR)	Seoul Cycling Team	+ 02' 11"
3	Hossein Askari (IRI)	Tabriz Petrochemical Team	+ 02' 36"
4	Peter McDonald (AUS)	Drapac–Porsche Cycling	+ 03' 22"
5	Amir Zargari (IRI)	Azad University Iran	s.t.
6	Alexandr Shushemoin (KAZ)	Kazakhstan	+ 04' 27"
7	Mathias Brändle (AUT)	Footon–Servetto–Fuji	+ 04' 52"
8	Markus Eibegger (AUT)	Footon–Servetto–Fuji	s.t.
9	Ghader Mizbani (IRI)	Tabriz Petrochemical Team	+ 05' 02"
10	Ahad Kazemi (IRI)	Tabriz Petrochemical Team	+ 05' 36"

=== Stage 7 ===
7 March 2010 — Kuala Kubu Bharu to Dataran Merdeka, 133.7 km (83.1 mi)

	Rider	Team	Time
1	Stuart Shaw (AUS)	Drapac–Porsche Cycling	03h 01' 00"
2	Vidal Celis (ESP)	Footon–Servetto–Fuji	s.t.
3	René Haselbacher (AUT)	Vorarlberg–Corratec	s.t.
4	Anuar Manan (MAS)	Geumsan Ginseng Asia	s.t.
5	Ruslan Tleubayev (KAZ)	Kazakhstan	s.t.
6	Tobias Erler (GER)	Tabriz Petrochemical Team	s.t.
7	Alex Candelario (USA)	Kelly Benefit Strategies	s.t.
8	Pierpaolo De Negri (ITA)	ISD–NERI	s.t.
9	Hossein Nateghi (IRI)	Azad University Iran	s.t.
10	Richard Lang (AUS)	Team Jayco–Skins	s.t.
