= UCI Continental Circuits =

Recurring sporting event

The UCI Continental Circuits are a series of road bicycle racing competitions which were introduced in 2005 by the Union Cycliste Internationale (UCI) to expand cycling around the world. The five circuits (representing the continents of Africa, the Americas, Asia, Europe and Oceania) are ranked below the UCI World Tour and UCI ProSeries.

== UCI Africa Tour ==
=== Winners ===
There is a rolling ranking for individuals and countries (the total of the top eight ranked riders of the nation), for which points can be won in all UCI road events, regardless of where the races take place. Prior to 2019 there was also a team ranking, and in all three categories points were earned in continental races of category HC or below (1.1 and 2.1 or below from 2020) that took place in Africa, regardless of the nationality of the rider.

Year	Individual Champion			Nations' Champion	Teams' Champion
Year	Name	Country	Team	Nations' Champion	Teams' Champion
2005	Tiaan Kannemeyer	South Africa	Team Barloworld-Valsir	South Africa	Team Barloworld-Valsir
2005–06	Rabaki Jérémie Ouédraogo	Burkina Faso	Café Samba	South Africa	Cycling Team Capec
2006–07	Hassen Ben Nasser	Tunisia	Pharmacie Centrale	South Africa	Barloworld
2007–08	Nicholas White	South Africa	Team MTN	South Africa	Team MTN
2008–09	Dan Craven	Namibia	Rapha Condor	South Africa	Barloworld
2009–10	Abdelatif Saadoune	Morocco		Morocco	MTN Energade
2010–11	Adil Jelloul	Morocco		Morocco	Groupement Sportif Petrolier Algérie
2011–12	Tarik Chaoufi	Morocco		Morocco	MTN-Qhubeka
2012–13	Adil Jelloul	Morocco		Morocco	MTN-Qhubeka
2013–14	Mekseb Debesay	Eritrea	Bike Aid–Ride for Help	Morocco	MTN-Qhubeka
2015	Salah Eddine Mraouni	Morocco	Morocco	Morocco	Skydive Dubai–Al Ahli
2016	Issak Tesfom Okubamariam	Eritrea	Sharjah Team	Eritrea	Al Nasr Pro Cycling Team–Dubai
2017	Willie Smit	South Africa	Team UC Nantes Atlantique	Eritrea	Bike Aid
2018	Joseph Areruya	Rwanda	Delko–Marseille Provence KTM	Eritrea	Sovac–Natura4Ever
2019	Daryl Impey	South Africa	Mitchelton–Scott	South Africa	ProTouch
2020	Daryl Impey	South Africa	Mitchelton–Scott	South Africa	ProTouch
2021	Biniam Girmay	Eritrea	Intermarché–Wanty–Gobert Matériaux	South Africa	ProTouch
2022	Biniam Girmay	Eritrea	Intermarché–Wanty–Gobert Matériaux	South Africa	ProTouch
2023	Henok Mulubrhan	Eritrea	Green Project–Bardiani–CSF–Faizanè	Eritrea	Sidi Ali–Unlock Team
2024	Biniam Girmay	Eritrea	Intermarché–Wanty	Eritrea	Madar Pro Cycling Team
2025	Biniam Girmay	Eritrea	Intermarché–Wanty	Eritrea	Madar Pro Cycling Team
2026	Biniam Girmay	Eritrea	NSN Cycling Team	Eritrea	Madar Pro Cycling Team

== UCI America Tour ==
=== Winners ===
There is a rolling ranking for individuals and countries (the total of the top eight ranked riders of the nation), for which points can be won in all UCI road events, regardless of where the races take place. Prior to 2019 there was also a team ranking, and in all three categories points were earned in continental races of category HC or below (1.1 and 2.1 or below from 2020) that took place in the Americas, regardless of the nationality of the rider.

Year	Individual Champion			Nations' Champion	Teams' Champion
Year	Name	Country	Team	Nations' Champion	Teams' Champion
2005	Edgardo Simón	Argentina	Selle Italia–Diquigiovanni	Brazil	Health Net–Maxxis
2005–06	José Serpa	Colombia	Selle Italia–Diquigiovanni	Colombia	Selle Italia–Diquigiovanni
2006–07	Svein Tuft	Canada	Symmetrics	Colombia	Symmetrics
2007–08	Manuel Medina	Venezuela	Gobernación del Zulia	United States	Team Garmin–Chipotle
2008–09	Gregorio Ladino	Colombia	Tecos de la Universidad Autónoma de Guadalajara	Colombia	Diquigiovanni–Androni
2009–10	Gregorio Ladino	Colombia	Boyacá Orgullo de America	Colombia	Funvic–Pindamonhangaba
2010–11	Miguel Ubeto	Venezuela		Colombia	EPM–UNE
2011–12	Rory Sutherland	Australia	UnitedHealthcare	Colombia	Real Cycling Team
2012–13	Janier Acevedo	Colombia	Jamis–Hagens Berman	Colombia	UnitedHealthcare
2013–14	Juan Carlos Rojas Villegas	Costa Rica	Frijoles Los Tierniticos-Arroz Halcón	United States	Team SmartStop
2015	Toms Skujiņš	Latvia	Hincapie Racing Team	Colombia	Optum–Kelly Benefit Strategies
2016	Greg Van Avermaet	Belgium	BMC Racing Team	Colombia	Holowesko Citadel Racing Team
2017	Serghei Tvetcov	Romania	Jelly Belly–Maxxis	Colombia	Rally Cycling
2018	Gavin Mannion	United States	UnitedHealthcare	Colombia	UnitedHealthcare
2019	Egan Bernal	Colombia	Team INEOS	Colombia	Medellín
2020	Nairo Quintana	Colombia	Arkéa–Samsic	Colombia	Team Medellín
2021	Egan Bernal	Colombia	INEOS Grenadiers	United States	Rally Cycling
2022	Sergio Higuita	Colombia	Bora–Hansgrohe	United States	Human Powered Health
2023	Sepp Kuss	United States	Team Jumbo–Visma	United States	Human Powered Health
2024	Matteo Jorgenson	United States	Visma–Lease a Bike	United States	Lidl–Trek Future Racing
2025	Isaac del Toro	Mexico	UAE Team Emirates XRG	United States	Lidl–Trek Future Racing
2026	Isaac del Toro	Mexico	UAE Team Emirates XRG	United States	Modern Adventure Pro Cycling

== UCI Asia Tour ==
=== Winners ===
There is a rolling ranking for individuals and countries (the total of the top eight ranked riders of the nation), for which points can be won in all UCI road events, regardless of where the races take place. Prior to 2019 there was also a team ranking, and in all three categories points were earned in continental races of category HC or below (1.1 and 2.1 or below from 2020) that took place in Asia, regardless of the nationality of the rider.

Year	Individual Champion			Nations' Champion	Teams' Champion
Year	Name	Country	Team	Nations' Champion	Teams' Champion
2005	Andrey Mizurov	Kazakhstan	Cycling Team Capec	Kazakhstan	Giant Asia Racing Team
2005–06	Ghader Mizbani	Iran	Giant Asia Racing Team	Iran	Giant Asia Racing Team
2006–07	Hossein Askari	Iran	Giant Asia Racing Team	Iran	Giant Asia Racing Team
2007–08	Hossein Askari	Iran	Tabriz Petrochemical Team	Japan	Tabriz Petrochemical Team
2008–09	Ghader Mizbani	Iran	Tabriz Petrochemical Team	Kazakhstan	Tabriz Petrochemical Team
2009–10	Mehdi Sohrabi	Iran	Tabriz Petrochemical Team	Iran	Tabriz Petrochemical Team
2010–11	Mehdi Sohrabi	Iran	Tabriz Petrochemical Team	Iran	Tabriz Petrochemical Team
2011–12	Hossein Alizadeh	Iran	Tabriz Petrochemical Team	Kazakhstan	Terengganu Cycling Team
2012–13	Julián Arredondo	Colombia	Team Nippo–De Rosa	Iran	Tabriz Petrochemical Team
2013–14	Samad Pourseyedi	Iran	Tabriz Petrochemical Team	Iran	Tabriz Petrochemical Team
2015	Samad Pourseyedi	Iran	Tabriz Petrochemical Team	Iran	Pishgaman–Giant
2016	Mark Cavendish	United Kingdom	Team Dimension Data	Iran	Pishgaman–Giant
2017	Mauricio Ortega	Colombia	RTS–Monton Racing Team	Kazakhstan	Team UKYO
2018	Alexey Lutsenko	Kazakhstan	Astana	Kazakhstan	Kinan Cycling Team
2019	Alexey Lutsenko	Kazakhstan	Astana	Kazakhstan	Terengganu Inc. TSG
2020	Alexey Lutsenko	Kazakhstan	Astana	Kazakhstan	Team Sapura Cycling
2021	Alexey Lutsenko	Kazakhstan	Astana–Premier Tech	Kazakhstan	Terengganu Cycling Team
2022	Alexey Lutsenko	Kazakhstan	Astana Qazaqstan Team	Kazakhstan	Terengganu Polygon Cycling Team
2023	Alexey Lutsenko	Kazakhstan	Astana Qazaqstan Team	Kazakhstan	Terengganu Polygon Cycling Team
2024	Alexey Lutsenko	Kazakhstan	Astana Qazaqstan Team	Kazakhstan	Terengganu Cycling Team
2025	Yevgeniy Fedorov	Kazakhstan	XDS Astana Team	Kazakhstan	Team UKYO
2026	Yevgeniy Fedorov	Kazakhstan	XDS Astana Team	Kazakhstan	Li-Ning Star

== UCI Europe Tour ==
=== Winners ===
There is a rolling ranking for individuals and countries (the total of the top eight ranked riders of the nation), for which points can be won in all UCI road events, regardless of where the races take place. Prior to 2019 there was also a team ranking, and in all three categories points were earned in continental races of category HC (1.1 and 2.1 or below from 2020) or below that took place in Europe, regardless of the nationality of the rider.

Year	Individual Champion			Nations' Champion	Teams' Champion
Year	Name	Country	Team	Nations' Champion	Teams' Champion
2005	Murilo Fischer	Brazil	Naturino–Sapore di Mare	Italy	AG2R Prévoyance
2005–06	Niko Eeckhout	Belgium	Chocolade Jacques–Topsport Vlaanderen	Italy	Acqua & Sapone–Caffè Mokambo
2006–07	Alessandro Bertolini	Italy	Serramenti PVC Diquigiovanni–Selle Italia	Italy	Rabobank
2007–08	Enrico Gasparotto	Italy	Barloworld	Italy	Acqua & Sapone–Caffè Mokambo
2008–09	Giovanni Visconti	Italy	ISD–NERI	Italy	Agritubel
2009–10	Giovanni Visconti	Italy	ISD–NERI	Italy	Vacansoleil
2010–11	Giovanni Visconti	Italy	Farnese Vini–Neri Sottoli	Italy	FDJ
2012	John Degenkolb	Germany	Argos–Shimano	Italy	Saur–Sojasun
2013	Riccardo Zoidl	Austria	Gourmetfein–Simplon	France	Team Europcar
2014	Tom Van Asbroeck	Belgium	Topsport Vlaanderen–Baloise	Italy	Topsport Vlaanderen–Baloise
2015	Nacer Bouhanni	France	Cofidis	Belgium	Topsport Vlaanderen–Baloise
2016	Baptiste Planckaert	Belgium	Wallonie-Bruxelles–Group Protect	Belgium	Wanty–Groupe Gobert
2017	Nacer Bouhanni	France	Cofidis	France	Wanty–Groupe Gobert
2018	Hugo Hofstetter	France	Cofidis	Belgium	Wanty–Groupe Gobert
2019	Primož Roglič	Slovenia	Team Jumbo–Visma	Belgium	Total Direct Énergie
2020	Primož Roglič	Slovenia	Team Jumbo–Visma	Belgium	Alpecin–Fenix
2021	Tadej Pogačar	Slovenia	UAE Team Emirates	Belgium	Alpecin–Fenix
2022	Tadej Pogačar	Slovenia	UAE Team Emirates	Belgium	Alpecin–Deceuninck
2023	Tadej Pogačar	Slovenia	UAE Team Emirates	Belgium	Lotto–Dstny
2024	Tadej Pogačar	Slovenia	UAE Team Emirates	Belgium	Lotto–Dstny
2025	Tadej Pogačar	Slovenia	UAE Team Emirates XRG	Belgium	Uno-X Mobility
2026	Tadej Pogačar	Slovenia	UAE Team Emirates XRG	Belgium	Pinarello–Q36.5 Pro Cycling Team

== UCI Oceania Tour ==
=== Winners ===
There is a rolling ranking for individuals and countries (the total of the top eight ranked riders of the nation), for which points can be won in all UCI road events, regardless of where the races take place. Prior to 2019 there was also a team ranking, and in all three categories points were earned in continental races of category HC or below (1.1 and 2.1 or below from 2020) that took place in Oceania, regardless of the nationality of the rider.

Year	Individual Champion			Nations' Champion	Teams' Champion
Year	Name	Country	Team	Nations' Champion	Teams' Champion
2005	Robert McLachlan	Australia	MG XPower Presented by BigPond	Australia	MG XPower Presented by BigPond
2005–06	Gordon McCauley	New Zealand	Successfulliving.com presented by Parkpre	Australia	Successfulliving.com presented by Parkpre
2006–07	Robert McLachlan	Australia	Drapac Porsche Development Program	Australia	Drapac Porsche Development Program
2007–08	Hayden Roulston	New Zealand	Trek-Zookeepers Café	Australia	SouthAustralia.com–AIS
2008–09	Peter McDonald	Australia	Drapac Porsche Cycling	Australia	Drapac Porsche Cycling
2009–10	Michael Matthews	Australia	Team Jayco–Skins	Australia	Team Jayco–Skins
2011	Richard Lang	Australia	Australia (national team)	Australia	Team Jayco–AIS
2011–12	Paul Odlin	New Zealand	Subway Cycling Team	Australia	Team Jayco–AIS
2013	Damien Howson	Australia		Australia	Huon Salmon-Genesys Wealth Advisers
2014	Robert Power	Australia	Australia (national team)	Australia	Avanti Racing Team
2015	Taylor Gunman	New Zealand	Avanti Racing Team	New Zealand	Avanti Racing Team
2016	Sean Lake	Australia	Avanti Racing Team	Australia	Avanti Racing Team
2017	Lucas Hamilton	Australia	Mitchelton Scott	Australia	Mitchelton Scott
2018	Chris Harper	Australia	Bennelong SwissWellness Cycling Team	Australia	Bennelong SwissWellness Cycling Team
2019	Caleb Ewan	Australia	Lotto–Soudal	Australia	Team BridgeLane
2020	Richie Porte	Australia	Trek–Segafredo	Australia	St George Continental Cycling Team
2021	Richie Porte	Australia	INEOS Grenadiers	Australia	Black Spoke Pro Cycling
2022	Michael Matthews	Australia	Team BikeExchange–Jayco	Australia	Bolton Equities Black Spoke Pro Cycling
2023	Kaden Groves	Australia	Alpecin–Deceuninck	Australia	Bolton Equities Black Spoke Pro Cycling
2024	Ben O'Connor	Australia	Decathlon–AG2R La Mondiale	Australia	Team BridgeLane
2025	Jay Vine	Australia	UAE Team Emirates XRG	Australia	CCACHE x BODYWRAP
2026 (Note: No events were held in the 2026 season, after Herald Sun Tour, the only event planned, were cancelled.)	Laurence Pithie	New Zealand	Red Bull–Bora–Hansgrohe	Australia	CCACHE x BODYWRAP
