= 2007–08 UCI Oceania Tour =

- Fourth edition of the UCI Oceania Tour

Details
- Dates: 15 October 2007–3 February 2008
- Location: Oceania
- Races: 6

Champions
- Individual champion: Hayden Roulston (NZL) (Trek-Zookeepers Café)
- Teams' champion: SouthAustralia.com–AIS
- Nations' champion: Australia

The 2007–08 UCI Oceania Tour was the fourth season of the UCI Oceania Tour. The season began on 15 October 2007 with the Herald Sun Tour and ended on 3 February 2008 with the Tour of Wellington.

The points leader, based on the cumulative results of previous races, wears the UCI Oceania Tour cycling jersey. Robert McLachlan of Australia was the defending champion of the 2006–07 UCI Oceania Tour. Hayden Roulston of New Zealand was crowned as the 2007–08 UCI Oceania Tour champion.

Throughout the season, points are awarded to the top finishers of stages within stage races and the final general classification standings of each of the stages races and one-day events. The quality and complexity of a race also determines how many points are awarded to the top finishers, the higher the UCI rating of a race, the more points are awarded. The UCI ratings from highest to lowest are as follows:

- Multi-day events: 2.HC, 2.1 and 2.2
- One-day events: 1.HC, 1.1 and 1.2

== Events ==
=== 2007 ===
Date	Race name	Location	UCI Rating	Winner	Team
15–21 October	Herald Sun Tour	Australia	2.1	Matthew Wilson (AUS)	Unibet.com
27 October	Melbourne to Warrnambool Classic	Australia	1.2	Tim Decker (AUS)	Decked Out Coaching
5–10 November	Tour of Southland	New Zealand	2.2	Hayden Roulston (NZL)	Trek-Zookeepers Café
14 November	Oceania Cycling Championships – Time Trial	Australia	CC	Gordon McCauley (NZL)	New Zealand (national team)
18 Nov	Oceania Cycling Championships – Road Race	Australia	CC	Hayden Roulston (NZL)	New Zealand (national team)

=== 2008 ===
Date	Race name	Location	UCI Rating	Winner	Team
30 January-3 February	Tour of Wellington	New Zealand	2.2	Travis Meyer (AUS)	SouthAustralia.com–AIS

== Final standings ==
=== Individual classification ===
Rank	Name	Points
1.	Hayden Roulston (NZL)	193
2.	Travis Meyer (AUS)	91
3.	Joseph Chapman (NZL)	77
4.	Paul Odlin (NZL)	60
5.	Joost van Leijen (NED)	52
6.	Marc Ryan (NZL)	50
7.	Gordon McCauley (NZL)	46
8.	David Pell (AUS)	43
9.	Rory Sutherland (AUS)	43
10.	Clinton Avery (NZL)	40

=== Team classification ===
Rank	Team	Points
1.	SouthAustralia.com–AIS	174
2.	Bissell Pro Cycling Team	103
3.	Savings & Loans	100
4.	Van Vliet–EBH Elshof	52
5.	Garmin–Chipotle	48
6.	Health Net–Maxxis	43
7.	Praties	36
8.	Toyota–United	35
9.	Drapac–Porsche Development Program	23
10.	Pezula Racing	18

=== Nation classification ===
Rank	Nation	Points
1.	Australia	1230.7
2.	New Zealand	793.2

=== Nation under-23 classification ===
Rank	Nation under-23	Points
1.	Australia	670
2.	New Zealand	143
