= 2008–09 UCI Oceania Tour =

Cycling tour season

- Fifth edition of the UCI Oceania Tour

Details
- Dates: 12 October 2008–15 February 2009
- Location: Oceania
- Races: 5

Champions
- Individual champion: Peter McDonald (AUS) (Drapac–Porsche Cycling)
- Teams' champion: Drapac–Porsche Cycling
- Nations' champion: Australia

The 2008–09 UCI Oceania Tour was the fifth season of the UCI Oceania Tour. The season began on 12 October 2008 with the Herald Sun Tour and ended on 15 February 2009 with the Oceania Cycling Championships.

The points leader, based on the cumulative results of previous races, wears the UCI Oceania Tour cycling jersey. Hayden Roulston of New Zealand was the defending champion of the 2007–08 UCI Oceania Tour. Peter McDonald of Australia was crowned as the 2008–09 UCI Oceania Tour champion.

Throughout the season, points are awarded to the top finishers of stages within stage races and the final general classification standings of each of the stages races and one-day events. The quality and complexity of a race also determines how many points are awarded to the top finishers, the higher the UCI rating of a race, the more points are awarded. The UCI ratings from highest to lowest are as follows:

- Multi-day events: 2.HC, 2.1 and 2.2
- One-day events: 1.HC, 1.1 and 1.2

== Events ==
=== 2008 ===
Date	Race Name	Location	UCI Rating	Winner	Team
12–18 October	Herald Sun Tour	Australia	2.1	Stuart O'Grady (AUS)	CSC–Saxo Bank
3–8 November	Tour of Southland	New Zealand	2.2	Hayden Roulston (NZL)	Health Net Pro Cycling Team

=== 2009 ===
Date	Race Name	Location	UCI Rating	Winner	Team
21–25 January	Tour of Wellington	New Zealand	2.2	Peter McDonald (AUS)	Drapac Porsche Cycling
12 February	Oceania Cycling Championships – Time Trial	Australia	CC	Chris Jongewaard (AUS)	Australia (national team)
15 February	Oceania Cycling Championships – Road Race	Australia	CC	Tommy Nankervis (AUS)	Australia (national team)

== Final standings ==
=== Individual classification ===
Rank	Name	Points
1.	Peter McDonald (AUS)	163
2.	Gordon McCauley (NZL)	112.33
3.	Tommy Nankervis (AUS)	100
4.	Daniel Braunsteins (AUS)	70
5.	Jeremy Yates (NZL)	64.66
6.	Hayden Roulston (NZL)	60
7.	Jeremy Vennell (NZL)	51
8.	Chris Jongewaard (AUS)	51
9.	Joseph Cooper (NZL)	45.33
10.	Benjamin Day (AUS)	43

=== Team classification ===
Rank	Team	Points
1.	Drapac–Porsche Cycling	262
2.	Subway-Avanti	226.98
3.	Cinelli-Down Under	147
4.	Cervélo TestTeam	101
5.	Praties	90
6.	Savings & Loans	76
7.	Team Budget Forklifts	70.32
8.	LeTua Cycling Team	64.66
9.	Bissell Pro Cycling Team	61
10.	Barloworld	51

=== Nation classification ===
Rank	Nation	Points
1.	Australia	1259
2.	New Zealand	592.63

=== Nation under-23 classification ===
Rank	Nation under-23	Points
1.	Australia	639.66
2.	New Zealand	117.65
