= 2006–07 UCI Oceania Tour =

- Third edition of the UCI Oceania Tour

Details
- Dates: 8 October 2006–5 May 2007
- Location: Oceania
- Races: 7

Champions
- Individual champion: Robert McLachlan (AUS) (Drapac–Porsche Development Program)
- Teams' champion: Drapac–Porsche Development Program
- Nations' champion: Australia

The 2006–07 UCI Oceania Tour was the third season of the UCI Oceania Tour. The season began on 8 October 2006 with the Herald Sun Tour and ended on 5 May 2007 with the Oceania Cycling Championships.

The points leader, based on the cumulative results of previous races, wears the UCI Oceania Tour cycling jersey. Gordon McCauley of New Zealand was the defending champion of the 2005–06 UCI Oceania Tour. Robert McLachlan of Australia was crowned as the 2006–07 UCI Oceania Tour champion.

Throughout the season, points are awarded to the top finishers of stages within stage races and the final general classification standings of each of the stages races and one-day events. The quality and complexity of a race also determines how many points are awarded to the top finishers, the higher the UCI rating of a race, the more points are awarded. The UCI ratings from highest to lowest are as follows:

- Multi-day events: 2.HC, 2.1 and 2.2
- One-day events: 1.HC, 1.1 and 1.2

== Events ==
=== 2006 ===
Date	Race name	Location	UCI Rating	Winner	Team
8–14 October	Herald Sun Tour	Australia	2.1	Simon Gerrans (AUS)	Australia (national team)
21 October	Melbourne to Warrnambool Classic	Australia	1.2	Robert McLachlan (AUS)	Drapac Porsche Development Program
6–11 November	Tour of Southland	New Zealand	2.2	Hayden Roulston (NZL)	Cycle Surgery

== Events ==
=== 2007 ===
Date	Race name	Location	UCI Rating	Winner	Team
16–21 January	Tour Down Under	Australia	2.HC	Martin Elmiger (SUI)	AG2R Prévoyance
24–28 January	Tour of Wellington	New Zealand	2.2	Hayden Roulston (NZL)	Trek-Zookeepers Café
3 May	Oceania Cycling Championships – Time Trial	Australia	CC	Cameron Wurf (AUS)	Australia (national team)
5 May	Oceania Cycling Championships – Road Race	Australia	CC	Robert McLachlan (AUS)	Australia (national team)

== Final standings ==
=== Individual classification ===
Rank	Name	Points
1.	Robert McLachlan (AUS)	238
2.	Karl Menzies (AUS)	215
3.	David Pell (AUS)	154.66
4.	Hayden Roulston (NZL)	145.66
5.	Wesley Sulzberger (AUS)	100
6.	Chris Jongewaard (AUS)	94
7.	Darren Lapthorne (AUS)	86
8.	Gordon McCauley (NZL)	76.66
9.	Hilton Clarke (AUS)	64
10.	Cameron Wurf (AUS)	45
11.	Ashley Whitehead (NZL)	44
12.	David McCann (IRL)	43
13.	Jeremy Vennell (NZL)	41
14.	Sean Finning (AUS)	40
15.	Justin Kerr (NZL)	36
16.	Robbie Williams (AUS)	35
17.	Simon Clarke (AUS)	34
18.	Pieter Ghyllebert (BEL)	34
19.	Phil Zajicek (USA)	34
20.	Craig McCartney (AUS)	31.66

=== Team classification ===
Rank	Team	Points
1.	Drapac Porsche Development Program	410
2.	Health Net Pro Cycling Team Presented by Maxxis	262
3.	Southaustralia.com–AIS	251
4.	Savings & Loans	171.32
5.	Navigators Insurance Cycling Team	165
6.	Jittery Joe's	110
7.	Plowman Craven	76.66
8.	Chocolade Jacques–Topsport Vlaanderen	67
9.	Priority Health	50
10.	DFL–Cyclingnews–Litespeed	41
11.	Babes Only-Villapark Lingemeer-Flanders	36
12.	Barloworld	31
13.	Toyota–United	30
14.	FRF Couriers-NSWIS	28
15.	Kodakgallery.com-Sierra Nevada	27
16.	Team 3C-Gruppe Lamonta	24
17.	Hadimec-Nazionale Elettronica	20
18.	Aisan Racing Team	16
19.	Colavita–Sutter Home	15.66
20.	Discovery Channel-Marco Polo	15.66

=== Nation classification ===
Rank	Nation	Points
1.	Australia	1486.66
2.	New Zealand	482.32

=== Nation under-23 classification ===
Rank	Nation under-23	Points
1.	Australia	333
2.	New Zealand	92.32
