= 2011 UCI Oceania Tour =

Cycling race

- Seventh edition of the UCI Oceania Tour

Details
- Dates: 26 January 2011–20 March 2011
- Location: Oceania
- Races: 3

Champions
- Individual champion: Richard Lang (AUS) (Australia)
- Teams' champion: Drapac Professional Cycling
- Nations' champion: Australia

The 2011 UCI Oceania Tour was the seventh season of the UCI Oceania Tour. The season began on 26 January 2011 with the Tour of Wellington and ended on 20 March 2011 with the Oceania Cycling Championships.

The points leader, based on the cumulative results of previous races, wears the UCI Oceania Tour cycling jersey. Michael Matthews of Australia was the defending champion of the 2009–10 UCI Oceania Tour. Richard Lang of Australia was crowned as the 2011 UCI Oceania Tour champion.

Throughout the season, points are awarded to the top finishers of stages within stage races and the final general classification standings of each of the stages races and one-day events. The quality and complexity of a race also determines how many points are awarded to the top finishers, the higher the UCI rating of a race, the more points are awarded. The UCI ratings from highest to lowest are as follows:

- Multi-day events: 2.HC, 2.1 and 2.2
- One-day events: 1.HC, 1.1 and 1.2

== Events ==
Date	Race name	Location	UCI Rating	Winner	Team
26–30 January	Tour of Wellington	New Zealand	2.2	George Bennett (NZL)	Cardno Team
17 March	Oceania Cycling Championships – Time Trial	Australia	CC	William Dickeson (AUS)	Australia (national team)
20 March	Oceania Cycling Championships – Road Race	Australia	CC	Richard Lang (AUS)	Australia (national team)

== Final standings ==
=== Individual classification ===
Rank	Name	Team	Points
1.	Richard Lang (AUS)	Team Jayco–AIS	100
2.	Nathan Haas (AUS)	Genesys Wealth Advisers	74
3.	George Bennett (NZL)	Trek Livestrong U23	53
4.	Damien Howson (AUS)	Team Jayco–AIS	46
5.	Nathan Earle (AUS)	Genesys Wealth Advisers	41
6.	Stuart Smith (AUS)		40
7.	James Williamson (NZL)	PureBlack Racing	36
8.	Patrick Lane (AUS)	Team Jayco–AIS	30
9.	Luke Davison (AUS)	Team Budget Forklifts	25
10.	Bernard Sulzberger (AUS)	V Australia	24

=== Team classification ===
Rank	Team	Points
1.	Team Jayco–AIS	218
2.	Genesys Wealth Advisers	131
3.	Trek Livestrong U23	65
4.	PureBlack Racing	62
5.	Drapac Professional Cycling	43
6.	Team Budget Forklifts	32
7.	V Australia	30
8.	Jelly Belly–Kenda	20
9.	Manisaspor Cycling Team	16
10.	Subway Cycling Team	8

=== Nation classification ===
Rank	Nation	Points
1.	Australia	830
2.	New Zealand	463

=== Nation under-23 classification ===
Rank	Nation under-23	Points
1.	Australia	651.67
2.	New Zealand	217
