= 2025 UCI America Tour =

Bicycle racing competition

2024–25 UCI America Tour
- Twenty-first edition of the UCI America Tour

Details
- Dates: 25 October 2024 – 19 October 2025
- Location: North America and South America
- Races: 24

The 2025 UCI America Tour was the 21st season of the UCI America Tour. The season began on 25 October 2024 with the Vuelta Ciclista Internacional a Guatemala and ended in October 2025.

The points leader, based on the cumulative results of previous races, wore the UCI America Tour cycling jersey. Throughout the season, points were awarded to the top finishers of stages within stage races and the final general classification standings of each of the stages races and one-day events. The quality and complexity of a race also determined how many points were awarded to the top finishers, the higher the UCI rating of a race, the more points were awarded.

The UCI ratings from highest to lowest were as follows:

- Multi-day events: 2.1 and 2.2
- One-day events: 1.1 and 1.2

== Events ==
Races in the 2025 UCI America Tour
Race	Rating	Date	Winner	Team
Vuelta Ciclista Internacional a Guatemala	2.2	25 October – 3 November 2024	Robinson Fabián López (COL)	GW Erco Shimano
(Brazil) Tour do Rio	2.2	1–3 November 2024	Sergio Henao (COL)	Nu Colombia
(Guyana) Caribbean Road Championships ITT	1.2	2 November 2024	Conor White (BER)	Bermuda (national team)
(Guyana) Caribbean Road Championships RR	1.2	3 November 2024	Cory Williams (BLZ)	Belize (national team)
Vuelta Ciclística al Ecuador	2.2	11–17 November 2024	Richard Huera (ECU)	Best PC Ecuador
Vuelta Ciclista a Costa Rica	2.2	13–22 December 2024	Luis Daniel Oses (CRC)	7C Economy Lacoinex
(Venezuela) Vuelta al Táchira en Bicicleta	2.2	12–19 January 2025	Eduin Becerra (VEN)	Team Trululu
Tour Colombia	2.1	4–9 February 2025	Cancelled	
(Chile) Vuelta Ciclista Internacional Bio Bio	2.2	12–16 February 2025	Cancelled	
Jamaica International Cycling Classic	2.2	4–6 April 2025	Sergio Henao (COL)	Nu Colombia
(Guatemala) Elite Road Central American Championships ITT	1.2	11 April 2025	Manuel Rodas (GUA)	Guatemala (national team)
(Guatemala) Elite Road Central American Championships TTT	1.2	12 April 2025	Donovan Ramírez; Joseph Ramírez; Daniel Bonilla; Gabriel Pacheco; Josué Salas; Gabriel Rojas	Costa Rica (national team)
(Guatemala) Elite Road Central American Championships RR	1.2	13 April 2025	Franklin Archibold (PAN)	Panama (national team)
(United States) Tour of the Gila	2.2	23–27 April 2025	Kieran Haug (USA)	Project Echelon Racing
(Guatemala) Vuelta BANTRAB	2.2	30 April – 4 May 2025	Wilson Peña (COL)	Team Sistecredito
(United States) Joe Martin Stage Race	2.2	15–18 May 2025	Cancelled	
(United States) Gran Premio New York City	1.2	18 May 2025	Sean Christian (USA)	Team Skyline
(Canada) Tour de Beauce	2.2	11–15 June 2025	Diego Camargo (COL)	Team Medellín–EPM
Vuelta a Colombia	2.2	1–10 August 2025	Rodrigo Contreras (COL)	Nu Colombia
Vuelta a Venezuela	2.2	7–14 September 2025	Luis Mora (VEN)	Gob. Trujillo - MPP Comercio
(Brazil) Volta Ciclística Internacional do Estado de Sao Paulo	2.2	17–21 September 2025	Cancelled	
Vuelta al Ecuador	2.2	6–12 October 2025	Cancelled	
(Brazil) Tour de Santa Catarina	2.2	8–12 October 2025	Diego Camargo (COL)	Team Medellín–EPM
(Belize) Caribbean Road Championships ITT	1.2	11 October 2025	Nicholas Narraway (BER)	Bermuda (national team)
(Belize) Caribbean Road Championships ITT U23	1.2	11 October 2025	Derrick Chavarria (BLZ)	Belize (national team)
(Belize) Caribbean Road Championships RR	1.2	12 October 2025	Rudy Germoso (DOM)	Dominican Republic (national team)
(Belize) Caribbean Road Championships RR U23	1.2	12 October 2025	Derrick Chavarria (BLZ)	Belize (national team)
(Guatemala) Cycling at the 2025 Central American Games ITT	1.2	18 October 2025	Franklin Archibold (PAN)	Panama (national team)
(Guatemala) Cycling at the 2025 Central American Games RR	1.2	19 October 2025	Sergio Chumil (GUA)	Guatemala (national team)
