= 2023 UCI America Tour =

- Nineteenth edition of the UCI America Tour

Details
- Dates: 23 October 2022 – 14 October 2023
- Location: North America and South America
- Races: 24

The 2023 UCI America Tour was the 19th season of the UCI America Tour. The season began on 23 October 2022 with the Vuelta a Guatemala and ended in October 2023.

The points leader, based on the cumulative results of previous races, wore the UCI America Tour cycling jersey. Throughout the season, points were awarded to the top finishers of stages within stage races and the final general classification standings of each of the stages races and one-day events. The quality and complexity of a race also determined how many points were awarded to the top finishers, the higher the UCI rating of a race, the more points were awarded.

The UCI ratings from highest to lowest were as follows:

- Multi-day events: 2.1 and 2.2
- One-day events: 1.1 and 1.2

== Events ==
Races in the 2023 UCI America Tour
Race	Rating	Date	Winner	Team	Ref
(Dominican Republic) Road Elite Caribbean Championships ITT	1.2	22 October 2022	Kaden Hopkins (BER)	Bermuda (national team)	
(Dominican Republic) Road Elite Caribbean Championships RR	1.2	23 October 2022	Edwin Nubul (MTQ)	Martinique (national team)	
Vuelta a Guatemala	2.2	23 October – 1 November 2022	Mardoqueo Vásquez (GUA)	Hino–One–La Red	
Vuelta Ciclista al Ecuador	2.2	12–19 November 2022	Robinson Chalapud (COL)	Team Banco Guayaquil–Ecuador	
Vuelta Ciclista Internacional a Costa Rica	2.2	16–25 December 2022	Marco Tulio Suesca (COL)	Movistar–Best PC	
(Argentina) Giro del Sol	2.2	6–8 January 2023	Maximiliano Navarrete (ARG)	Gremios por el Deporte–Cutral Co	
(Venezuela) Vuelta al Táchira en Bicicleta	2.2	15–22 January 2023	José Alarcón (VEN)	Fundación Ángeles Hernández	
(Argentina) Vuelta del Porvenir San Luis	2.2	1–5 February 2023	Martín Vidaurre (CHI)	Chile (national team)	
(Guatemala) Vuelta BANTRAB	2.2	29 March – 2 April 2023	Óscar Sevilla (ESP)	Team Medellín–EPM	
(Panama) Elite Road Central American Championships ITT	1.2	14 April 2023	Christofer Jurado (PAN)	Panama (national team)	
(Panama) Elite Road Central American Championships ITT	1.2U	14 April 2023	Donovan Ramírez (CRC)	Costa Rica (national team)	
(Panama) Elite Road Central American Championships RR	1.2U	15 April 2023	Bredio Ruiz (PAN)	Panama (national team)	
(Panama) Elite Road Central American Championships RR	1.2	16 April 2023	Christofer Jurado (PAN)	Panama (national team)	
(United States) Tour of the Gila	2.2	26–30 April 2023	Alex Hoehn (USA)	Above & Beyond Cancer Cycling p/b Bike World	
(Argentina) Vuelta a Catamarca Internacional	2.2	4–7 May 2023	Miguel Ángel López (COL)	Team Medellín–EPM	
(Argentina) Vuelta a Formosa Internacional	2.2	11–14 May 2023	Laureano Rosas (ARG)	Gremios por el Deporte–Cutral Co	
(United States) Walmart Joe Martin Stage Race	2.2	18–21 May 2023	Riley Sheehan (USA)	Team Ecoflo Chronos	
(Canada) Tour de Beauce	2.2	14–18 June 2023	Luke Valenti (CAN)	Team Ecoflo Chronos	
Vuelta a Colombia	2.2	16–25 June 2023	Miguel Ángel López (COL)	Team Medellín–EPM	
Gran Premio Guatemala	1.2	12 August 2023	Róbigzon Oyola (COL)	Team Medellín–EPM	
(Guatemala) Gran Premio Chapin	1.2	13 August 2023	Javier Jamaica (COL)	Team Medellín–EPM	
Vuelta al Ecuador	2.2	27–30 September 2023	Robinson Chalapud (COL)	Team Banco Guayaquil–Bianchi	
(Brazil) Grand Tour de Ciclismo de SC	1.2	3 October 2023	Leangel Linarez (VEN)	Tavfer–Ovos Matinados–Mortágua	
(Brazil) GP Urubici de Ciclismo	1.2	4 October 2023	Roderick Asconeguy (URU)	Elequipo Entrenamientos	
(Brazil) GP Internacional de Ciclismo de Santa Catarina	1.2	5 October 2023	Juan Felipe Rodríguez (COL)	Pío Rico Cycling Team	
(Guadeloupe) Caribbean Road Championships ITT	1.2	14 October 2023	Conor White (BER)	Bermuda (national team)	
(Guadeloupe) Caribbean Road Championships RR	1.2	15 October 2023	Damien Urcel (GLP)	Guadalupe (national team)	
