= 2019 UCI Oceania Tour =

- Fifteenth edition of the UCI Oceania Tour

Details
- Dates: 19 January – 17 March
- Location: Oceania
- Races: 7

Champions
- Individual champion: (Australia) Michael Matthews
- Teams' champion: (Australia) Team BridgeLane
- Nations' champion: Australia

The 2019 UCI Oceania Tour was the 15th season of the UCI Oceania Tour. The season began on 19 January 2018 with the Gravel and Tar and finished on 17 March 2019 with the Continental Championships.

Throughout the season, points are awarded to the top finishers of stages within stage races and the final general classification standings of each of the stages races and one-day events. The quality and complexity of a race also determines how many points are awarded to the top finishers, the higher the UCI rating of a race, the more points are awarded. The UCI ratings from highest to lowest are as follows:

- Multi-day events: 2.HC, 2.1 and 2.2
- One-day events: 1.HC, 1.1 and 1.2

== Events ==
Date	Race Name	Location	UCI Rating	Winner	Team	Ref
19 January	Gravel and Tar	New Zealand	1.2	Luke Mudgway (NZL)	EvoPro Racing	
23–27 January	New Zealand Cycle Classic	New Zealand	2.2	Aaron Gate (NZL)	EvoPro Racing	
30 January – 3 February	Herald Sun Tour	Australia	2.1	Dylan van Baarle (NED)	Team Sky	
15 March	Oceanian Cycling Championships – Time Trial	Australia	CC	Ben Dyball (AUS)	Team Sapura Cycling	
15 March	Oceanian Cycling Championships – Time Trial U23	Australia	CC	Liam Magennis (AUS)	Drapac Cannondale Holistic Development Team	
17 March	Oceanian Cycling Championships – Road Race	Australia	CC	Ben Dyball (AUS)	Team Sapura Cycling	
17 March	Oceanian Cycling Championships – Road Race U23	Australia	CC	Tyler Lindorff (AUS)	Team BridgeLane	

== Final standings ==
=== Individual classification ===
Rank	Name	Points
1.	Michael Matthews (AUS)	2344.86
2.	Richie Porte (AUS)	1444.57
3.	Rohan Dennis (AUS)	1318.86
4.	George Bennett (NZL)	1126
5.	Ben Dyball (AUS)	897
6.	Jack Haig (AUS)	753
7.	Patrick Bevin (NZL)	533.57
8.	Caleb Ewan (AUS)	497.74
9.	Nathan Haas (AUS)	494.67
10.	Chris Harper (AUS)	426

=== Team classification ===
Rank	Team	Points
1.	(Australia) Team BridgeLane	1151
2.	(Australia) Pro Racing Sunshine Coast	448
3.	(Australia) Oliver's Real Food Racing	321
4.	(Australia) Drapac Cannondale Holistic Development Team	286
5.	(Australia) St George Continental Cycling Team	280
6.	(Australia) Futuro–Maxxis Pro Cycling	5

=== Nation classification ===
Rank	Nation	Points
1.	Australia	8176.7
2.	New Zealand	2736.82
