= Thomas Palmer (cyclist) =

Australian cyclist (born 1990)

Personal information
- Born: 28 June 1990 (age 36) Wagga Wagga, Australia

Cycling career
- Sport: Cycling
- Current team: Retired
- Disciplines: Road, Track
- Role: Rider
- Rider type: Sprinter

Professional team
- 2007–2014: Drapac–Porsche Development Program

Thomas Palmer (born 28 June 1990 in Wagga Wagga) is an Australian former cyclist.

== Major results ==
=== Track ===
2007
1st World Junior Kilometer Championships
3rd World Junior Team Sprint Championships
2008
1st World Junior Team Pursuit Championships (with Luke Davison, Rohan Dennis and Luke Durbridge)
1st World Junior Madison Championships (with Luke Davison)
2nd World Junior Kilometer Championships

=== Road ===
2009
1st Stage 1 Tour de Okinawa
2010
1st Stage 1 Tour de Okinawa
2nd National Criterium Championships
2011
1st Stage 1 Tour de Okinawa
3rd National Criterium Championships
2012
1st Stage 4 New Zealand Cycle Classic
1st Tour de Okinawa
2013
1st Stage 5 New Zealand Cycle Classic
