= Cotswold Outdoor =

British retail chain

Cotswold Outdoor Group Ltd
- Trade name: Cotswold Outdoor
- Formerly: Oval (1200) Limited (June–July 1997); Cotswold Outdoor Limited (1997–2015); Outdoor and Cycle Concepts Limited (2015-2025); Cotswold Outdoor Group Limited (2025->)
- Type: Private
- Industry: Retailer
- Founded: 1974
- Headquarters: Swindon, Wiltshire, United Kingdom
- Area served: UK
- Products: Outdoor Clothing and Equipment
- Owner: PAI Partners
- Number of employees: circa 1200
- Parent: Retail Concepts N.V
- Website: cotswoldoutdoor.com

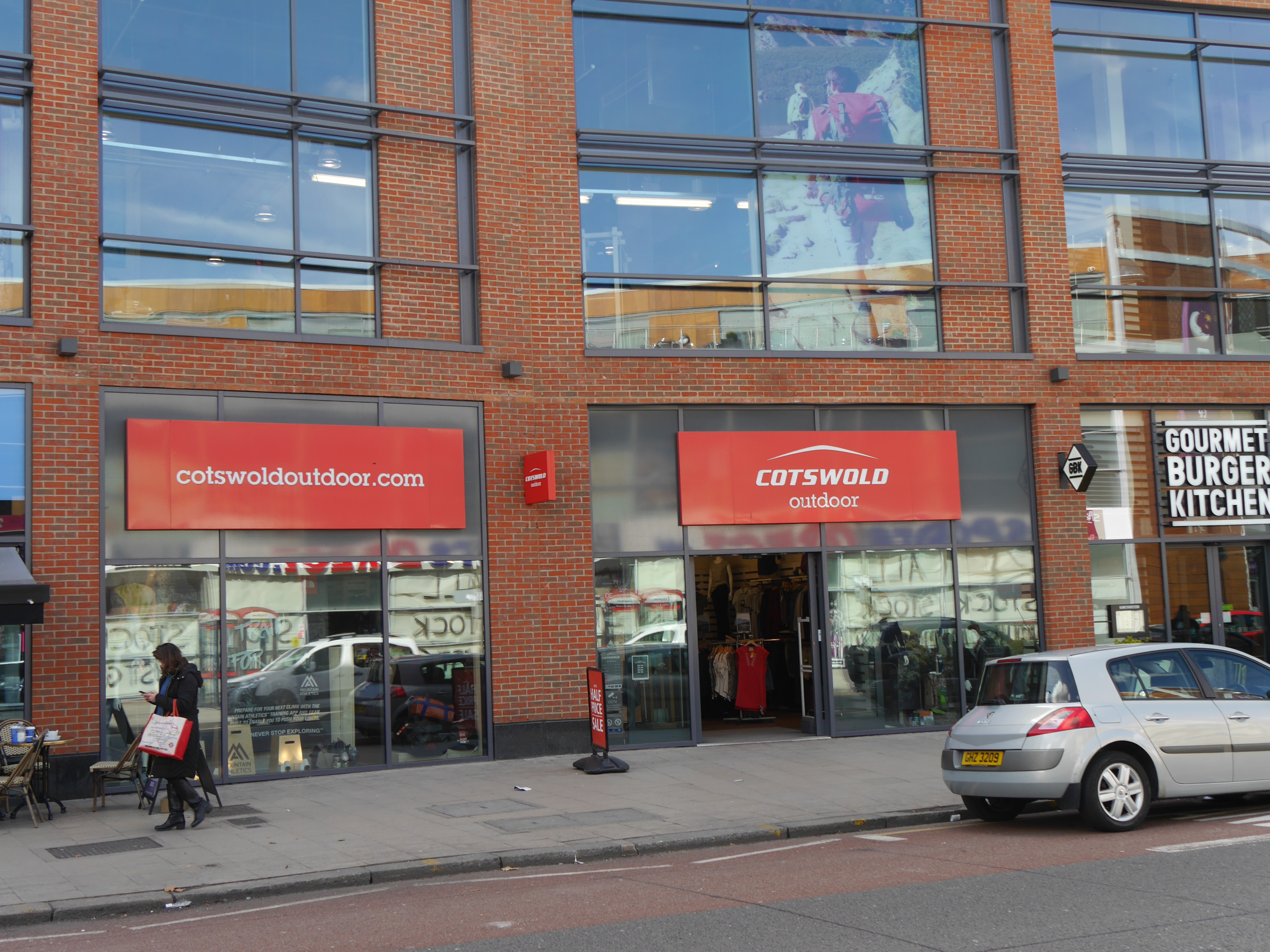
Cotswold Outdoor, Southside Wandsworth, London

Cotswold Outdoor Group Ltd, trading as Cotswold Outdoor, is an outdoor recreation retailer in the United Kingdom. It is a trading brand of Cotswold Outdoor Group Ltd, which also owns the Snow and Rock and Runners Need chain of shops.

== History ==
Founded in 1974, the company originated in the Cotswolds, and was based in a garage next to the Cotswold Water Park from which the founders sold basic camping accessories. Cotswold Outdoor is the recommended retailer for the National Trust and the Ramblers. Cotswold Outdoor has 79 shops across the United Kingdom, an e-commerce website and a mail order service selling outdoor clothing, camping and climbing equipment, travel clothing and hiking boots.

On 26 April 2019, Outdoor and Cycle Concepts Limited applied for a company voluntary arrangement (CVA) following increased pre-tax losses in a struggling UK retail environment.

Greg Nieuwenhuys resigned as chief executive in March 2019, and was succeeded by Jose Ramon Finch Castro, who joined the board as managing director the following month.

In June 2025, Cotswold Outdoor Group partnered with Zitcha to launch the Cotswold Outdoor Group Media Portal, a retail media network integrating in-store digital screens, website banners, sponsored product placements, and off-site campaigns on platforms such as Meta and YouTube.

== Subsidiaries ==
Snow and Rock is a chain of skiing and mountaineering shops. It was founded in the early 1980s by Mike Browne, who borrowed £60,000 from the bank using his house as collateral. Browne opened its first shop on Kensington High Street in London. By 2001, there were eight Snow and Rock shops that collectively had net sales of £22 million per year. In 2004, Andrew Brownsword acquired the firm, which then had 11 UK shops, and Browne left the company.

In 2010, Brownsword sold the firm to LGV Capital, Legal & General's private equity subsidiary. At the time of the acquisition Snowit had 35 shops, employed 450, had £65 million in revenue the previous year, and owned Cycle Surgery and Runners Need. In 2015, the PAI Partners-owned A.S.Adventure Group, which owns Cotswold Outdoor, acquired Snow and Rock, Cycle Surgery and Runners Need, which at the time had 46 shops In November 2015, Cotswold Outdoor, Snow and Rock, Cycle Surgery and Runners Need became "one single legal entity called Outdoor and Cycle Concepts".
