= 2008 Tour de Suisse =

2008 UCI ProTour, race 9 of 15

Race details
- Dates: 14–22 June 2008
- Stages: 9
- Distance: 1,411.6 km (877.1 mi)
- Winning time: 35h 43' 46"

Results
	Winner	Roman Kreuziger (CZE)	(Liquigas)
	Second	Andreas Klöden (GER)	(Astana)
	Third	Igor Antón (ESP)	(Euskaltel–Euskadi)
	Points	Fabian Cancellara (SUI)	(Team CSC)
	Mountains	Maxim Iglinsky (KAZ)	(Astana)
	Sprints	René Weissinger (GER)	(Team Volksbank)
	Team	(Kazakhstan) Astana	

The 2008 Tour de Suisse was the 72nd edition of the Tour de Suisse road cycling stage race. The race took place from 14 June to 22 June 2008 and is part of the 2008 UCI ProTour. It began in Langnau im Emmental and ended in Bern. The race was won by Roman Kreuziger.

== Teams ==
Twenty teams of eight riders started the race:

- Caisse d'Epargne
- Liquigas
- Crédit Agricole
- Silence–Lotto
- Cofidis
- Team Milram
- Lampre
- Ag2r–La Mondiale
- Quick-Step
- Astana
- Rabobank
- Française des Jeux
- Team CSC
- Gerolsteiner
- Saunier Duval–Scott
- Bouygues Télécom
- Euskaltel–Euskadi
- Team High Road
- BMC Racing Team
- Team Volksbank

== Route ==
Stage characteristics and winners
Stage	Date	Course	Distance	Type	Winner
1	14 June	Langnau im Emmental to Langnau im Emmental	146 km (90.7 mi)	Medium mountain stage	Óscar Freire (ESP)
2	15 June	Langnau im Emmental to Flumserberg	197 km (122.4 mi)	Medium mountain stage	Igor Antón (ESP)
3	16 June	Flums to Gossau SG	155 km (96.3 mi)	Hilly stage	Robbie McEwen (AUS)
4	17 June	Gossau SG to Domat/Ems	171 km (106.3 mi)	Hilly stage	Robbie McEwen (AUS)
5	18 June	Domat/Ems to Caslano	190 km (118.1 mi)	Mountain stage	Markus Fothen (GER)
6	19 June	Ambrì to Verbier	188 km (116.8 mi)	Mountain stage	Kim Kirchen (LUX)
7	20 June	Gruyères to Lyss	171 km (106.3 mi)	Hilly stage	Fabian Cancellara (SUI)
8	21 June	Altdorf to Klausen Pass	25 km (15.5 mi)	Individual time trial	Roman Kreuziger (CZE)
9	22 June	Altdorf to Bern	168 km (104.4 mi)	Hilly stage	Fabian Cancellara (SUI)

== Stages ==
=== Stage 1 ===
14 June 2008 - Langnau I.E. to Langnau I.E., 146 km (91 mi)

Stage 1 Results

	Cyclist	Team	Time
1	Óscar Freire (ESP)	Rabobank	3h 42' 35"
2	Martin Elmiger (SUI)	Ag2r–La Mondiale	s.t.
3	Kim Kirchen (LUX)	Team High Road	s.t.
4	Greg Van Avermaet (BEL)	Silence–Lotto	s.t.
5	Philippe Gilbert (BEL)	Française des Jeux	s.t.

General Classification after Stage 1

	Cyclist	Team	Time
1	Óscar Freire (ESP)	Rabobank	3h 42' 25"
2	Martin Elmiger (SUI)	Ag2r–La Mondiale	+ 4"
3	David Loosli (SUI)	Lampre	+ 4"
4	Kim Kirchen (LUX)	Team High Road	+ 6"
5	Iñigo Landaluze (ESP)	Euskaltel–Euskadi	+ 7"

=== Stage 2 ===
15 June 2008 - Langnau I.E. to Flumserberg, 197 km (122 mi)

Stage 2 Results

	Cyclist	Team	Time
1	Igor Antón (ESP)	Euskaltel–Euskadi	5h 00' 04"
2	Kim Kirchen (LUX)	Team High Road	+ 6"
3	Damiano Cunego (ITA)	Lampre	+ 6"
4	Fränk Schleck (LUX)	Team CSC	+ 6"
5	Oliver Zaugg (SUI)	Gerolsteiner	+ 8"

General Classification after Stage 2

	Cyclist	Team	Time
1	Igor Antón (ESP)	Euskaltel–Euskadi	8h 42' 29"
2	Kim Kirchen (LUX)	Team High Road	+ 6"
3	Damiano Cunego (ITA)	Lampre	+ 12"
4	Fränk Schleck (LUX)	Team CSC	+ 16"
5	Oliver Zaugg (SUI)	Gerolsteiner	+ 18"

=== Stage 3 ===
16 June 2008 - Flums to Gossau SG, 155 km (96 mi)

Stage 3 Results

	Cyclist	Team	Time
1	Robbie McEwen (AUS)	Silence–Lotto	3h 50' 05"
2	Óscar Freire (ESP)	Rabobank	s.t.
3	Gerald Ciolek (GER)	Team High Road	s.t.
4	Robert Förster (GER)	Gerolsteiner	s.t.
5	Danilo Napolitano (ITA)	Gerolsteiner	s.t.

General Classification after Stage 3

	Cyclist	Team	Time
1	Igor Antón (ESP)	Euskaltel–Euskadi	12h 32' 34"
2	Kim Kirchen (LUX)	Team High Road	+ 6"
3	Damiano Cunego (ITA)	Lampre	+ 12"
4	Fränk Schleck (LUX)	Team CSC	+ 16"
5	Oliver Zaugg (SUI)	Gerolsteiner	+ 18"

=== Stage 4 ===
17 June 2008 - Gossau SG to Domat/Ems, 171 km (106 mi)

Stage 4 Results

	Cyclist	Team	Time
1	Robbie McEwen (AUS)	Silence–Lotto	4h 04' 10"
2	Óscar Freire (ESP)	Rabobank	s.t.
3	Gerald Ciolek (GER)	Team High Road	s.t.
4	Leonardo Duque (COL)	Cofidis	s.t.
5	Markus Zberg (SUI)	Gerolsteiner	s.t.

General Classification after Stage 4

	Cyclist	Team	Time
1	Igor Antón (ESP)	Euskaltel–Euskadi	16h 36' 44"
2	Kim Kirchen (LUX)	Team High Road	+ 6"
3	Damiano Cunego (ITA)	Lampre	+ 12"
4	Fränk Schleck (LUX)	Team CSC	+ 16"
5	Oliver Zaugg (SUI)	Gerolsteiner	+ 18"

=== Stage 5 ===
18 June 2008 - Domat/Ems to Caslano, 190 km (120 mi)

Stage 5 Results

	Cyclist	Team	Time
1	Markus Fothen (GER)	Gerolsteiner	4h 47' 31"
2	Sergei Ivanov (RUS)	Astana	+ 50"
3	Markus Zberg (SUI)	Gerolsteiner	+ 57"
4	Michael Albasini (SUI)	Liquigas	+ 57"
5	Alexander Bocharov (RUS)	Crédit Agricole	+ 57"

General Classification after Stage 5

	Cyclist	Team	Time
1	Igor Antón (ESP)	Euskaltel–Euskadi	21h 25' 12"
2	Kim Kirchen (LUX)	Team High Road	+ 6"
3	Oliver Zaugg (SUI)	Gerolsteiner	+ 18"
4	Roman Kreuziger (CZE)	Liquigas	+ 21"
5	Stijn Devolder (BEL)	Quick-Step	+ 22"

=== Stage 6 ===
19 June 2008 - Ambrì to Verbier, 188 km (117 mi)

Stage 6 Results

	Cyclist	Team	Time
1	Kim Kirchen (LUX)	Team High Road	5h 29' 23"
2	Andreas Klöden (GER)	Astana	s.t.
3	Roman Kreuziger (CZE)	Liquigas	+ 6"
4	Sergei Ivanov (RUS)	Liquigas	+ 12"
5	Stijn Devolder (BEL)	Quick-Step	+ 20"

General Classification after Stage 6

	Cyclist	Team	Time
1	Kim Kirchen (LUX)	Team High Road	26h 54' 31"
2	Roman Kreuziger (CZE)	Liquigas	+ 27"
3	Igor Antón (ESP)	Euskaltel–Euskadi	+ 33"
4	Stijn Devolder (BEL)	Quick-Step	+ 46"
5	Thomas Lövkvist (SWE)	Team High Road	+ 56"

=== Stage 7 ===
20 June 2008 - Gruyères to Lyss, 171 km (106 mi)

Stage 7 Results

	Cyclist	Team	Time
1	Fabian Cancellara (SUI)	Team CSC	3h 47' 09"
2	Erik Zabel (GER)	Team Milram	+ 2"
3	Robbie McEwen (AUS)	Silence–Lotto	+ 2"
4	Robert Förster (GER)	Gerolsteiner	+ 2"
5	Danilo Napolitano (ITA)	Lampre	+ 2"

General Classification after Stage 7

	Cyclist	Team	Time
1	Kim Kirchen (LUX)	Team High Road	30h 41' 42"
2	Roman Kreuziger (CZE)	Liquigas	+ 27"
3	Igor Antón (ESP)	Euskaltel–Euskadi	+ 33"
4	Stijn Devolder (BEL)	Quick-Step	+ 46"
5	Thomas Lövkvist (SWE)	Team High Road	+ 56"

=== Stage 8 ===
21 June 2008 - Altdorf to Klausen Pass, 25 km (16 mi) (ITT)

Stage 8 Results

	Cyclist	Team	Time
1	Roman Kreuziger (CZE)	Liquigas	1h 00' 22"
2	José Rujano (VEN)	Caisse d'Epargne	+ 16"
3	Andreas Klöden (GER)	Astana	+ 17"
4	Damiano Cunego (ITA)	Lampre	+ 54"
5	Fränk Schleck (LUX)	Team CSC	+ 1' 26"

General Classification after Stage 8

	Cyclist	Team	Time
1	Roman Kreuziger (CZE)	Liquigas	31h 42' 31"
2	Andreas Klöden (GER)	Astana	+ 49"
3	Igor Antón (ESP)	Euskaltel–Euskadi	+ 1' 55"
4	Damiano Cunego (ITA)	Lampre	+ 2' 11"
5	Thomas Lövkvist (SWE)	Team High Road	+ 2' 37"

=== Stage 9 ===
22 June, 2008 - Altdorf to Bern, 168 km (104 mi)

Stage 9 Results

	Cyclist	Team	Time
1	Fabian Cancellara (SUI)	Team CSC	
2	Philippe Gilbert (BEL)	Française des Jeux	s.t.
3	Daniel Moreno (ESP)	Caisse d'Epargne	+ 4"
4	Matteo Tosatto (ITA)	Quick-Step	+ 5"
5	Markus Zberg (SUI)	Gerolsteiner	+ 5"

General Classification after Stage 9

	Cyclist	Team	Time
1	Roman Kreuziger (CZE)	Liquigas	35h 43' 46"
2	Andreas Klöden (GER)	Astana	+ 49"
3	Igor Antón (ESP)	Euskaltel–Euskadi	+ 1' 55"
4	Damiano Cunego (ITA)	Lampre	+ 2' 11"
5	Thomas Lövkvist (SWE)	Team High Road	+ 2' 37"

== Classification leadership ==
Stage	Winner	General classification	Points classification	Mountains classification	Sprints classification	Team classification
1	Óscar Freire	Óscar Freire	Óscar Freire	no award	no award	Caisse d'Epargne
2	Igor Antón	Igor Antón	Kim Kirchen	David Loosli	David Loosli	Team CSC
3	Robbie McEwen	Igor Antón	Óscar Freire	David Loosli	René Weissinger	Team CSC
4	Robbie McEwen	Igor Antón	Óscar Freire	David Loosli	René Weissinger	Team CSC
5	Markus Fothen	Igor Antón	Óscar Freire	David Loosli	René Weissinger	Gerolsteiner
6	Kim Kirchen	Kim Kirchen	Óscar Freire	David Loosli	René Weissinger	Astana
7	Fabian Cancellara	Kim Kirchen	Óscar Freire	Maxim Iglinsky	René Weissinger	Astana
8	Roman Kreuziger	Roman Kreuziger	Óscar Freire	Maxim Iglinsky	René Weissinger	Astana
9	Fabian Cancellara	Roman Kreuziger	Fabian Cancellara	Maxim Iglinsky	René Weissinger	Astana
Final		Roman Kreuziger	Fabian Cancellara	Maxim Iglinsky	René Weissinger	Astana

- In stage 2, Martin Elmiger wore the green jersey.
- In stage 3, Martin Elmiger wore the white jersey.

== See also ==
- 2008 in road cycling
