= Rhys Pollock =

Australian racing cyclist

Personal information
- Full name: Rhys Pollock
- Nickname: Rice
- Born: 14 March 1980 (age 46) Sydney, New South Wales, Australia
- Height: 184 cm (6 ft 0 in)

Cycling career
- Sport: Cycling
- Current team: CharterMason Giant Racing
- Discipline: Road
- Role: Rider

Amateur teams
- 2003–2004: Pedale d'Alsace Strasbourg
- 2014–: CharterMason Giant Racing

Professional teams
- 2005–2006: Marco Polo
- 2007: DFL-Cyclingnews
- 2008: Trek–Marco Polo
- 2009–2013: Drapac–Porsche Cycling

Rhys Pollock (born 14 March 1980) is an Australian racing cyclist and former national under-23 MTB champion. Pollock has ridden as a professional since 2005 for continental teams from Asia, Europe and Australia. In 2005 he was a member of the Marco Polo and has gone on to ride for DFL-Cyclingnews-Litespeed and Drapac Professional Cycling. A bad weather specialist, Pollock has had wins in Australia's longest one day race, Melbourne to Warrnambool and stage 2, 2011 Tour of Tasmania when it snowed.

== Career ==
Pollock represented Australia in MTB World Cups before switching to full-time road racing in 2001. 1999 saw Pollock ride for Australia at under-23 level in three MTB world cups, Sydney, Belgium and the world championships in Sweden. 2001–02 were the first years spent racing overseas, riding for Staf Boone at Belgian amateur team Kingsnorth Wheelers. French team Pedale L'alsace was the first professional team Pollock rode in, spending the seasons 2003–04 collecting numerous top ten results and one win. Graduating from the U23 ranks in 2005, Pollock signed with Marco Polo seeing him ride alongside Nathan Dahlberg, Li Fuyu and Leon Van Bon over his time with Marco Polo.

In 2008 Pollock rode for UCI Continental ranked team DFL-CyclingNews-Litespeed out of Belgium, racing in solely in Europe with one excursion to Australia for the season ending Herald Sun Tour. DFL riders and staff included former Gent-Wevelgem winner Nico Mattan, Daniel Lloyd, Jens Mouris and Bernard Sulzberger. 1987 Paris Roubaix winner Eric Vanderaerden was Directeur sportif for DFL. 2008 was a solid year with starts in Het Volk (Het Niuewsblad) and Three Days of De Panne. After DFL folded at the end of the season, Pollock returned to Chinese team Marco Polo.

Pollock then signed with Australian domestic team Drapac Professional Cycling for the 2009 season where he remained until 2013. This team choice assisted with the decision to complete further studies. The 2012 Tour De Taiwan is the first stage race Pollock has won. Being a rider more suited to one day courses, Pollock regularly escapes in the day's breakaway. Results of this attacking style have been a win in Stage 1 of Herald Sun Tour and Stage 1 of Tour de Taiwan, these moves let Pollock capture the race lead for 3 days at the Herald Sun Tour and claim overall win at the aforementioned Tour De Taiwan.

== Palmares ==
2012
1st Overall Tour de Taiwan
2011
1st Stage 1 Herald Sun Tour
wearer Stages 2 to 4 Herald Sun Tour
2010
1st Melbourne to Warrnambool
1st Stage 2 Tour of Tasmania
2008
1st Most aggressive stage 2 Tour of Georgia
