= 2009–10 UCI Asia Tour =

- Sixth edition of the UCI Asia Tour

Details
- Dates: 6 October 2009–20 September 2010
- Location: Asia
- Races: 35

Champions
- Individual champion: Mehdi Sohrabi (IRI) (Tabriz Petrochemical Team)
- Teams' champion: Tabriz Petrochemical Team
- Nations' champion: Iran

The 2009–10 UCI Asia Tour was the 6th season of the UCI Asia Tour. The season began on 6 October 2009 with the Tour of Milad du Nour, and ended on 20 September 2010 with the Tour de Hokkaido.

The points leader, based on the cumulative results of previous races, wears the UCI Asia Tour cycling jersey. Ghader Mizbani from Iran was the defending champion of the 2008–09 UCI Asia Tour. Mehdi Sohrabi of Iran was crowned as the 2009–10 UCI Asia Tour champion.

Throughout the season, points are awarded to the top finishers of stages within stage races and the final general classification standings of each of the stages races and one-day events. The quality and complexity of a race also determines how many points are awarded to the top finishers, the higher the UCI rating of a race, the more points are awarded.

The UCI ratings from highest to lowest are as follows:

- Multi-day events: 2.HC, 2.1 and 2.2
- One-day events: 1.HC, 1.1 and 1.2

== Events ==
=== 2009 ===
Date	Race Name	Location	UCI Rating	Winner	Team
6–10 October	Tour of Milad du Nour	Iran	2.2	Mehdi Sohrabi (IRI)	Tabriz Petrochemical Team
15–20 October	Azerbaïjan Tour	Iran	2.2	Ahad Kazemi (IRI)	Tabriz Petrochemical Team
25 October	Japan Cup	Japan	1.HC	Chris Anker Sørensen (DEN)	Team Saxo Bank
7–8 November	Tour de Okinawa	Japan	2.2	Kenji Itami (JPN)	Bridgestone Anchor
8 November	Tour de Seoul	South Korea	1.2	Cho Ho-Sung (KOR)	Seoul Cycling Team
11–19 November	Tour of Hainan	China	2.HC	Francisco Ventoso (ESP)	Carmiooro A Style
15 November	Kumamoto International Road Race	Japan	1.2	Yasuharu Nakajima (JPN)	EQA-Meitan Hompo-Graphite Design
22 November – 2 December	Tour d'Indonesia	Indonesia	2.2	Mehdi Sohrabi (IRI)	Tabriz Petrochemical Team

=== 2010 ===
Date	Race Name	Location	UCI Rating	Winner	Team
22 January	H. H. Vice President Cup	United Arab Emirates	1.2	Mouhssine Lahsaini (MAR)	Morocco (national team)
23 January	Emirates Cup	United Arab Emirates	1.2	Malcolm Lange (RSA)	South Africa (national team)
6–10 February	Kerman Tour	Iran	2.2	Abbas Saeidi (IRI)	Azad University Iran
7–12 February	Tour of Qatar	Qatar	2.1	Wouter Mol (NED)	Vacansoleil
14–19 February	Tour of Oman	Oman	2.1	Fabian Cancellara (SUI)	Team Saxo Bank
21 February	Mumbai Cyclothon	India	1.2	Juan José Haedo (ARG)	Team Saxo Bank
1–7 March	Tour de Langkawi	Malaysia	2.HC	José Rujano (VEN)	ISD–NERI
14–20 March	Tour de Taiwan	Taiwan	2.2	David McCann (IRL)	Giant Asia Racing Team
1–6 April	Tour of Thailand	Thailand	2.2	Kiel Reijnen (USA)	Jelly Belly–Kenda
10 April	Asian Cycling Championships – Time trial	United Arab Emirates	CC	Andrey Mizourov (KAZ)	Kazakhstan (national team)
12 April	Asian Cycling Championships – Road race	United Arab Emirates	CC	Mehdi Sohrabi (IRI)	Iran (national team)
17–20 April	Le Tour de Filipinas	Philippines	2.2	David McCann (IRL)	Giant Asia Racing Team
22 April – 2 May	Tour de Korea	South Korea	2.2	Michael Friedman (USA)	Jelly Belly–Kenda
24–25 April	Melaka Governor Cup	Malaysia	2.2	David McCann (IRL)	Giant Asia Racing Team
27 April – 1 May	Jelajah Malaysia	Malaysia	2.2	David McCann (IRL)	Giant Asia Racing Team
3–8 May	Azerbaïjan Tour	Iran	2.2	Ghader Mizbani (IRI)	Tabriz Petrochemical Team
11–15 May	International Presidency Tour	Iran	2.2	Hossein Askari (IRI)	Tabriz Petrochemical Team
16–23 May	Tour of Japan	Japan	2.2	Cristiano Salerno (ITA)	De Rosa–Stac Plastic
27–30 May	Tour de Kumano	Japan	2.2	Andrey Mizurov (KAZ)	Tabriz Petrochemical Team
1–5 June	Tour of Singkarak	Indonesia	2.2	Ghader Mizbani (IRI)	Tabriz Petrochemical Team
13 June	Tour de Jakarta	Indonesia	1.2	Matnur Matnur (INA)	Polygon Sweet Nice
18–20 June	Tour de East Java	Indonesia	2.2	Hossein Alizadeh (IRI)	Tabriz Petrochemical Team
7–11 July	Tour of Milad du Nour	Iran	2.2	Ramin Mehrabani (IRI)	Azad University Iran
17–25 July	Tour of Qinghai Lake	China	2.HC	Hossein Askari (IRI)	Tabriz Petrochemical Team
29 August	Tour de Delhi	India	2.2	Arran Brown (RSA)	South Africa (national team)
10–19 September	Tour of China	China	2.2	Dirk Müller (GER)	Team Nutrixxion-Sparkasse
16–20 September	Tour de Hokkaido	Japan	2.2	Miyataka Shimizu (JPN)	Bridgestone–Anchor

== Final standings ==
=== Individual classification ===
Rank	Name	Team	Points
1.	Mehdi Sohrabi (IRI)	Tabriz Petrochemical Team	466.66
2.	Hossein Askari (IRI)	Tabriz Petrochemical Team	438.33
3.	Ghader Mizbani (IRI)	Tabriz Petrochemical Team	313.33
4.	David McCann (IRL)	Giant Asia Racing Team	298.66
5.	Boris Shpilevsky (RUS)	Russia (national team)	246
6.	Amir Zargari (IRI)	Azad University Iran	224.33
7.	Takashi Miyazawa (JPN)	CDC–Cavaliere	209
8.	Francisco Ventoso (ESP)	Carmiooro NGC	195
9.	Andrey Mizurov (KAZ)	Tabriz Petrochemical Team	191.66
10.	Radoslav Rogina (CRO)	Loborika	146

=== Team classification ===
Rank	Team	Points
1.	Tabriz Petrochemical Team	1983.3
2.	Azad University Iran	651.98
3.	Giant Asia Racing Team	507.97
4.	CDC–Cavaliere	357
5.	Jelly Belly–Kenda	218
6.	Team Nutrixxion-Sparkasse	212
7.	Seoul Cycling Team	205
8.	Carmiooro NGC	195
9.	Bridgestone Anchor	192
10.	Geumsan Ginseng Asia	189

=== Nation classification ===
Rank	Nation	Points
1.	Iran	2017.96
2.	Japan	995
3.	Kazakhstan	667.36
4.	South Korea	332
5.	Hong Kong	231
6.	Uzbekistan	230.2
7.	Indonesia	207
8.	Malaysia	203
9.	Kyrgyzstan	191.66
10.	Mongolia	141

=== Nation under-23 classification ===
Rank	Nation under-23	Points
1.	Iran	259.64
2.	Kazakhstan	210.66
3.	Hong Kong	108
4.	Japan	91.98
5.	Mongolia	64
6.	South Korea	52
7.	Malaysia	40
8.	United Arab Emirates	36
9.	Kyrgyzstan	32
10.	Indonesia	29
