= A.S.Adventure =

Belgian outdoor retail chain

- Type: Private
- Industry: Retail
- Founded: 1995; 31 years ago
- Founder: Emiel Lathouwers
- Headquarters: Hoboken, Belgium
- Area served: Belgium, France, Luxembourg
- Products: Outdoor clothing, footwear and equipment
- Parent: Yonderland
- Website: www.asadventure.com

A.S.Adventure is a Belgian retail chain selling outdoor clothing, footwear and equipment, with stores in Belgium, France and Luxembourg. It was founded in 1995 in Schoten by Emiel Lathouwers and grew out of a family business dating back to 1937. Its holding company, known until 2021 as the A.S.Adventure Group, also acquired the Dutch chain Bever and the British retailers Cotswold Outdoor and Snow & Rock. Following a financial restructuring in 2021 the holding company was renamed Yonderland; it is controlled by the French private equity firm PAI Partners, with management holding a minority stake.

== History ==
=== Origins ===
The Lathouwers family opened a hardware shop in Hoboken in 1937 and later a second shop in Borgerhout. In 1958 the family took over a shop at the Vogelmarkt in Antwerp that sold surplus equipment of the United States Army from the Second World War, and it later ran five such army-surplus stores in and around the city; the initials "A.S." refer to these Amerikaanse Stockhuizen ("American surplus stores"). In the 1970s and 1980s the surplus-store format came under pressure from the growth of large DIY stores.

=== Founding and expansion ===
In 1995 Emiel Lathouwers opened the first A.S.Adventure store in Schoten, dedicated to outdoor activities.

In 1998 the investment company Mitiska acquired a stake in the business. In 2000 the company acquired the British outdoor retailer Cotswold Outdoor, followed in 2007 by the Dutch chain Bever Zwerfsport. Also in 2007, Mitiska and Lathouwers sold the business to the British private equity firm Lion Capital, with Lathouwers retaining a 10 per cent stake.

=== Ownership by PAI Partners ===
In February 2015 Lion Capital sold the A.S.Adventure Group to PAI Partners. Later that year the group bought the Snow & Rock Group, comprising the Snow & Rock, Cycle Surgery and Runners Need chains with a combined 46 shops, from LGV Capital. Together with the 69 Cotswold Outdoor stores, the group expected its UK turnover to reach £210 million. In November 2015 the four British chains were merged into a single company, Outdoor and Cycle Concepts.

In August 2017 the group entered the German market by acquiring McTrek, an outdoor retailer with 39 stores, for a reported €38 million.

=== Financial difficulties and restructuring ===
In January 2019 Sky News reported that A.S.Adventure was preparing a store closure programme in the United Kingdom, where it operated around 120 stores with a turnover of £190 million and employed 1,200 people. In May 2019 creditors of Outdoor and Cycle Concepts approved a company voluntary arrangement under which the company sought lower rents at 50 of its 120 stores and closed four shops. In April 2020, during the COVID-19 pandemic, McTrek's parent company filed for insolvency proceedings in Germany, with all 43 of its stores temporarily closed.

In 2021 the group completed a debt restructuring under which banks waived €85 million of debt in exchange for 45 per cent of the shares, while PAI Partners and management retained 55 per cent, and €25 million of new capital was injected. The holding company was renamed Yonderland; the store names were not affected. For 2022 the group reported a record EBITDA of €53.5 million, and in 2023 it operated 190 stores in five countries. In February 2026 PAI Partners and management bought out the stake of around 45 per cent held by the banks since 2021, with PAI regaining full control and management taking a substantial minority stake. For its most recent financial year, reported in July 2026, Yonderland recorded revenue of €642.5 million, up 1.2 per cent, and a small net loss.

=== Recent developments ===
The Belgian stores are operated by Retail Concepts, which also runs the concept store Juttu. In 2020 Bea De Beuckelaer succeeded Dominique Motte as its chief executive. On 2 September 2025 A.S.Adventure opened its fiftieth store, on the Rue de Béthune in Lille; it was the chain's fourth location in France, after Reims, Bordeaux and Nice.

== Operations ==
A.S.Adventure sells clothing, footwear, backpacks and equipment for hiking, camping, winter sports and travel, combining international brands with its own label, Ayacucho. Established in 2009 and named after the Ayacucho Region of Peru, Ayacucho is a member of 1% for the Planet and supports projects in Peru, Kenya and India through the Belgian development organisation Solid.

The chain offers repair and maintenance of footwear and clothing, and rents out skiing and snowboarding equipment as well as winter-sports clothing. In 2023 it launched Second Life, a second-hand range that was extended in September 2025 to adult clothing and equipment; customers can trade in used items for a voucher. In October 2024 the company opened a Care & Repair Center of more than 2,000 m² in Hoboken, bringing together footwear and textile repair, a washing service and ski maintenance. It works there with the Antwerp social enterprise Kunnig, which helps people who are distant from the labour market into work.

Since 2024 A.S.Adventure has co-organised the outdoor and hiking festival NOMADSLAND in the Belgian Ardennes with the travel company Travelbase.
