= 2024 UCI Africa Tour =

- Twentieth edition of the UCI Africa Tour

Details
- Dates: 27 October 2023 – 6 October 2024
- Location: Africa
- Races: 18

The 2024 UCI Africa Tour is the 20th season of the UCI Africa Tour. The season began on 27 October with the 34th edition of Tour du Faso and will end on 6 October 2024.

The points leader, based on the cumulative results of previous races, wore the UCI Africa Tour cycling jersey.

Throughout the season, points were awarded to the top finishers of stages within stage races and the final general classification standings of each of the stages races and one-day events. The quality and complexity of a race also determined how many points were awarded to the top finishers: the higher the UCI rating of a race, the more points were awarded. The UCI ratings from highest to lowest were as follows:

- Multi-day events: 2.1 and 2.2
- One-day events: 1.1 and 1.2

== Events ==
Races in the 2024 UCI Africa Tour
Race	Rating	Date	Winner	Team	Ref
(Burkina Faso) Tour du Faso	2.2	27 October – 5 November 2023	Paul Daumont (BUR)	Burkina Faso (national team)	
Tour du Rwanda	2.1	18–25 February 2024	Joseph Blackmore (GBR)	Israel–Premier Tech	
(Benin) Tour du Bénin	2.1	30 April – 5 May 2024	Achraf Ed Doghmy (MAR)	Morocco (national team)	
(Algeria) Grand Prix de la Ville d'Oran	1.2	11 May 2024	Nassim Saidi (ALG)	Madar Pro Cycling Team	
(Algeria) Tour d'Algérie	2.2	12–21 May 2024	Nassim Saidi (ALG)	Madar Pro Cycling Team	
Tour du Mali	2.2	21–26 May 2024	Yaya Diallo (MLI)	Club Cycliste Airness de Niéna	
(Algeria) Grand Prix de la Ville d'Annaba	1.2	22 May 2024	Milkias Maekele (ERI)	Eritrea (national team)	
(Algeria) Grand Prix de la Ville d'Alger	1.2	24 May 2024	Hamza Amari (ALG)	Madar Pro Cycling Team	
(Cameroon) Tour du Cameroun	2.2	29 May – 9 June 2024	Clovis Kamzong (CMR)	SNH Vélo Club	
(Morocco) Tour du Maroc	2.2	31 May – 9 June 2024	Axel Narbonne Zuccarelli (FRA)	Nice Métropole Côte d'Azur	
(Mauritius) Tour de Maurice	2.2	11–14 June 2024	Piotr Brożyna (POL)	Team Felt–Felbermayr	
(Mauritius) Courts Mamouth Classique de l'ìle Maurice	1.2	16 June 2024	Patryk Stosz (POL)	Team Felt–Felbermayr	
(Mauritius) Championnat des Îles de l'Océan Indien ITT	1.2	30 June 2024	Alexandre Mayer (MRI)	Mauritius (national team)	
(Mauritius) Championnat des Îles de l'Océan Indien RR	1.2	4 July 2024	Alexandre Mayer (MRI)	Mauritius (national team)	
(Cameroon) Grand Prix Chantal Biya	2.2	1–5 October 2024	Wesley Van Dyck (BEL)	Cycling Vlaanderen	
(Cameroon) Grand Prix d'Ongola	1.2	6 October 2024	Oussama Mimouni (ALG)	Algeria (national team)	
