= Cycle Surgery =

British chain of bicycle shops

Cycle Surgery Limited
- Type: Subsidiary
- Industry: Retail
- Founded: 1992; 34 years ago in London, UK
- Founder: Ben Cater; Crispin Coghill; Stephen Swinton
- Key people: Jose Ramon Finch Castro (Managing Director)
- Products: Bicycles, Sports Clothes and sports equipment
- Parent: Outdoor and Cycle Concepts Limited

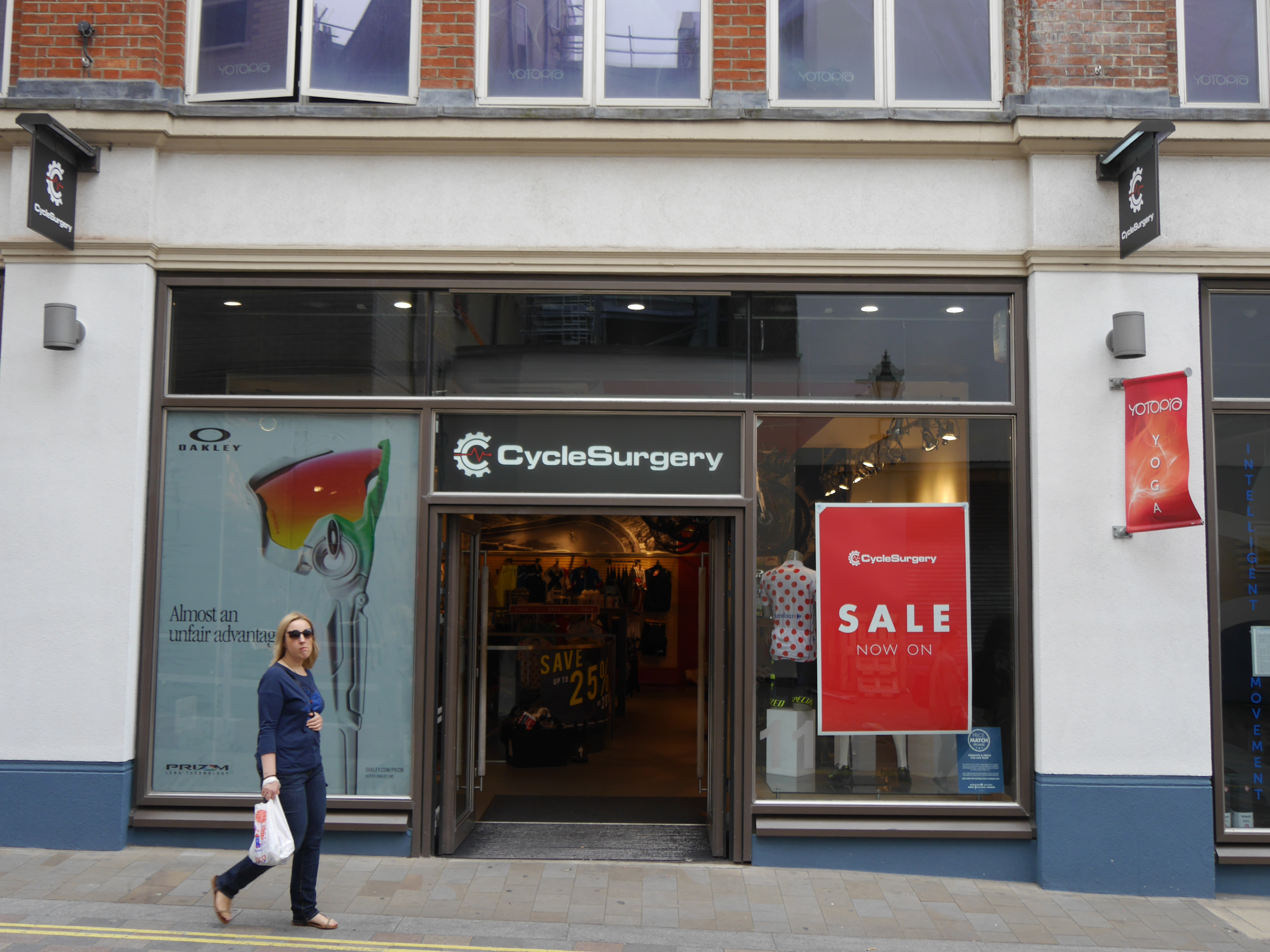
Cycle Surgery, Mercer Street, London

Cycle Surgery was a British chain of bicycle shops, with 30 shops in the UK.

It was a subsidiary of Outdoor and Cycle Concepts which itself is owned by A.S.Adventure Group, who also own the Cotswold Outdoor, Snow and Rock and Runners Need retail chains.

In 2020 it was announced that all 14 stores would be closing down. 5 stores were due to close by May 2020 and the other 9 would be converted to other stores in the parent company's portfolio

== History ==
Cycle Surgery was founded in 1992, and started as a bicycle workshop in a basement in Horsell Road, Islington, London N7.

In 2007 the company was sold to Snow and Rock

Following the announcement of their King's Cross store closure on 13 February 2020, on 30 April Cycle Surgery indicated to their mailing list that they were closing down entirely. ″Since 1992, we've worked hard to provide you, our customers, with the best brands in cycling and unrivalled expert service to help keep you in the saddle. Sadly, it's almost time for us to say goodbye but whilst we might be winding down, we’re committed to offering the best service possible, right until the very end. For now, you can still shop your favourite brands online with up to 70% off in our closing down sale and gear up for your next ride, wherever it takes you.″ No further details were given.

The company announced on their website that due to effects of COVID-19 some of their stores would not be opening again. On 19 August 2020 Cycle Surgery closed.
