= Robert McLachlan (cyclist) =

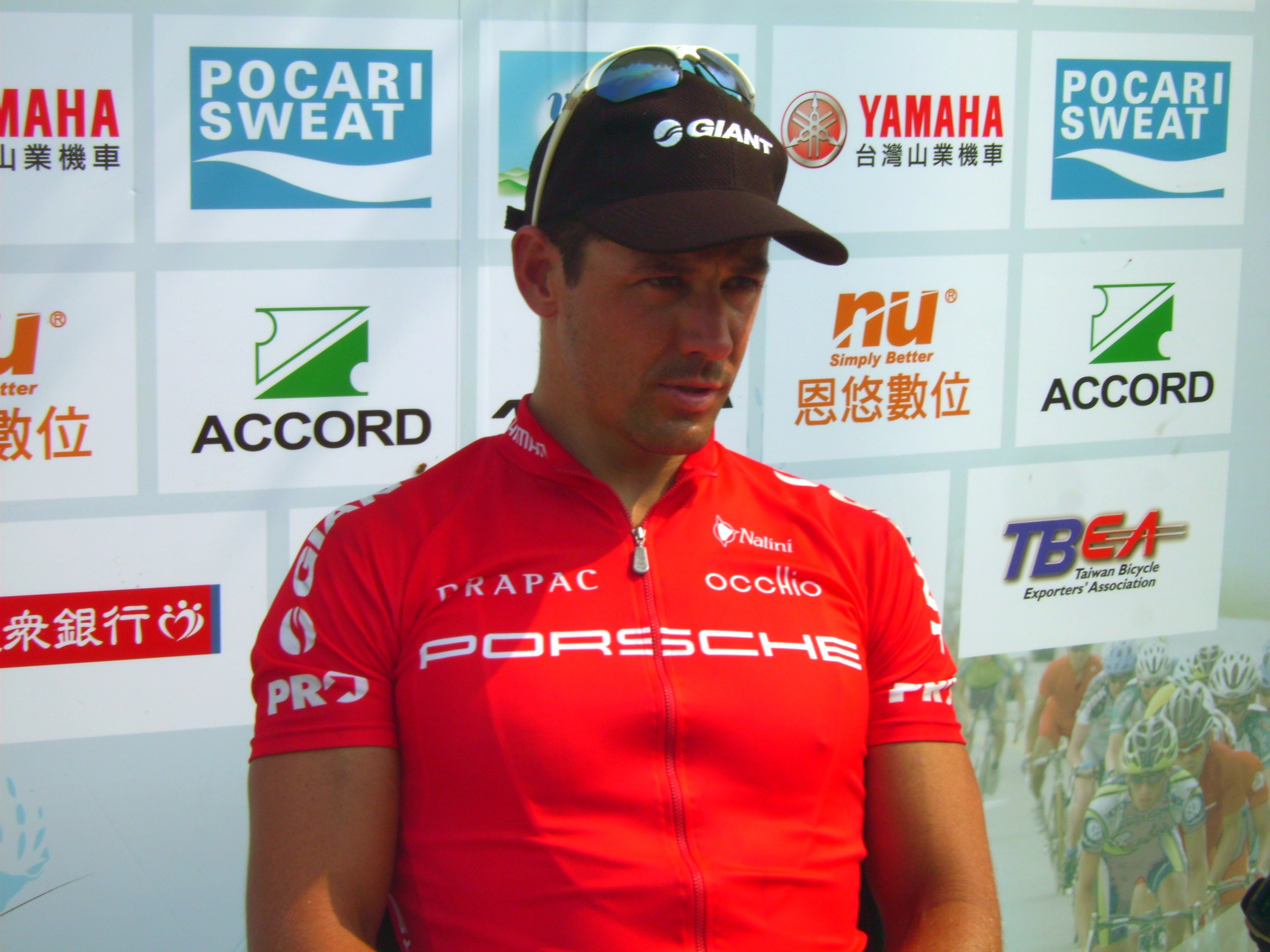
- McLachlan at the 2007 Tour of Taiwan

Personal information
- Full name: Robert McLachlan
- Born: 17 April 1971 (age 55) Leeton, New South Wales, Australia

Cycling career
- Sport: Cycling
- Discipline: Road
- Role: Rider

Robert McLachlan (born 17 April 1971) is a professional road bicycle racer from Australia. The 1992 Olympian now rides for the Drapac Porsche Development Program and a two-time series champion of the UCI Oceania Tour. He was an Australian Institute of Sport scholarship holder.

== Major results ==
2004

- 2nd, Australian National Cycling Championships - Road Race

2005 - MG XPower Presented by BigPond

- Champion, 2004–2005 UCI Oceania Tour
- Tour de Korea
  - 1st, Stage 3
  - 1st, Stage 6
- Champion, Tattersall's Cup Series
- Tour of Gippsland (Tattersall's Cup Series)
  - 1st, Criterium championship classification
  - 1st, Stage 3
  - 1st, Stage 7
  - 1st, Stage 8
  - 1st, Stage 9
- 6th, Overall, Jayco Tour of Tasmania (Tattersall's Cup Series)
  - 1st, Stage 5
  - 1st, Stage 7
- 2nd, Australian National Cycling Championships - Road Race

2006

- 1st, Overall, Tour of Chong Ming
- 1st, Melbourne to Warrnambool Classic
- Tour de Korea
  - 1st, Stage 2
  - 1st, Stage 6

2007 - Drapac Porsche Development Program

- Champion, 2006-2007 UCI Oceania Tour
- 9th Overall, Bay Classic Series
- 1st, Oceania Continental Cycling Championships - Road Race
- 2nd, Australian National Cycling Championships - Road Race
