= Stuart Shaw (cyclist) =

Australian bicycle racer

Personal information
- Full name: Stuart Shaw
- Born: 19 November 1977 (age 48) Canberra, Australia

Cycling career
- Sport: Cycling
- Discipline: Road
- Role: Rider

Amateur team
- 2014: Search2retain–Health.com.au

Professional teams
- 2005: MG Xpower–BigPond
- 2006–2012: Drapac–Porsche
- 2015: Search2retain–Health.com.au
- 2017: New South Wales Institute of Sport
- 2018–2020: ACA–Ride Sunshine Coast

Stuart Shaw (born 19 November 1977 in Canberra) is an Australian cyclist, who most recently rode for UCI Continental team ARA Pro Racing Sunshine Coast. He is engaged to Italian princess Rebecca Arcaini.

== Major results ==
2005
1st Stage 2 Tour of Gippsland
1st Stage 2 Tour of Tasmania
1st Stage 7 Tour of the Murray River
2nd Overall Tour de Korea
2006
1st Stage 2 Tour of Wellington
Tour de Korea

1st Stages 1 & 5

3rd Overall Canberra Tour
2007
1st Overall National Road Series
1st Overall Tour de Perth

1st Stage 2a

1st Stage 4 Canberra Tour
2008
3rd Halle–Ingooigem
7th Overall Tour de Okinawa
2009
1st Stage 1 Tour de Gironde
2nd Overall Canberra Tour

1st Stage 2

2010
1st Stage 7 Tour de Langkawi
2nd Overall Tour of the Murray River

1st Stage 1

2011
3rd National Criterium Championships
2016
1st Stage 3 National Capital Tour
