= Vidal Celis =

Spanish cyclist

Personal information
- Full name: Félix Vidal Celis Zabala
- Born: August 21, 1982 (age 44) Santander, Spain

Cycling career
- Sport: Cycling
- Current team: Retired
- Discipline: Road
- Role: Rider
- Rider type: Sprinter

Amateur teams
- 2001: Iberdrola–Loina
- 2002–2003: Orbea–Olarra–Consultec
- 2007: Camargo–Roper

Professional teams
- 2005–2006: Orbea
- 2008–2009: Barbot–Siper
- 2010: Footon–Servetto–Fuji
- 2011: LeTua Cycling Team
- 2012: Azad University Cross Team (Note: Joined on 1 April.)
- 2013: RTS Racing Team (Note: Left on 1 April.)

Félix Vidal Celis Zabala (born 21 August 1982) is a Spanish former professional road cyclist.

== Major results ==
2002
1st Stage 9 Circuito Montañés
2003
1st Stage 1 Vuelta a Cantabria
2004
1st Stage 4 Bizkaiko Bira
1st Stage 2 Vuelta a Cantabria
2005
6th Trofeo Alcudia
2006
1st Stage 7 Circuito Montañés
2007
1st Overall Vuelta a Segovia
1st Stage 2 Vuelta a Zamora
2010
5th Philadelphia International Cycling Classic
8th Circuito de Getxo
2011
5th Overall Jelajah Malaysia

1st Stages 2 & 5
