= Peter McDonald (cyclist) =

Australian cyclist (born 1978)

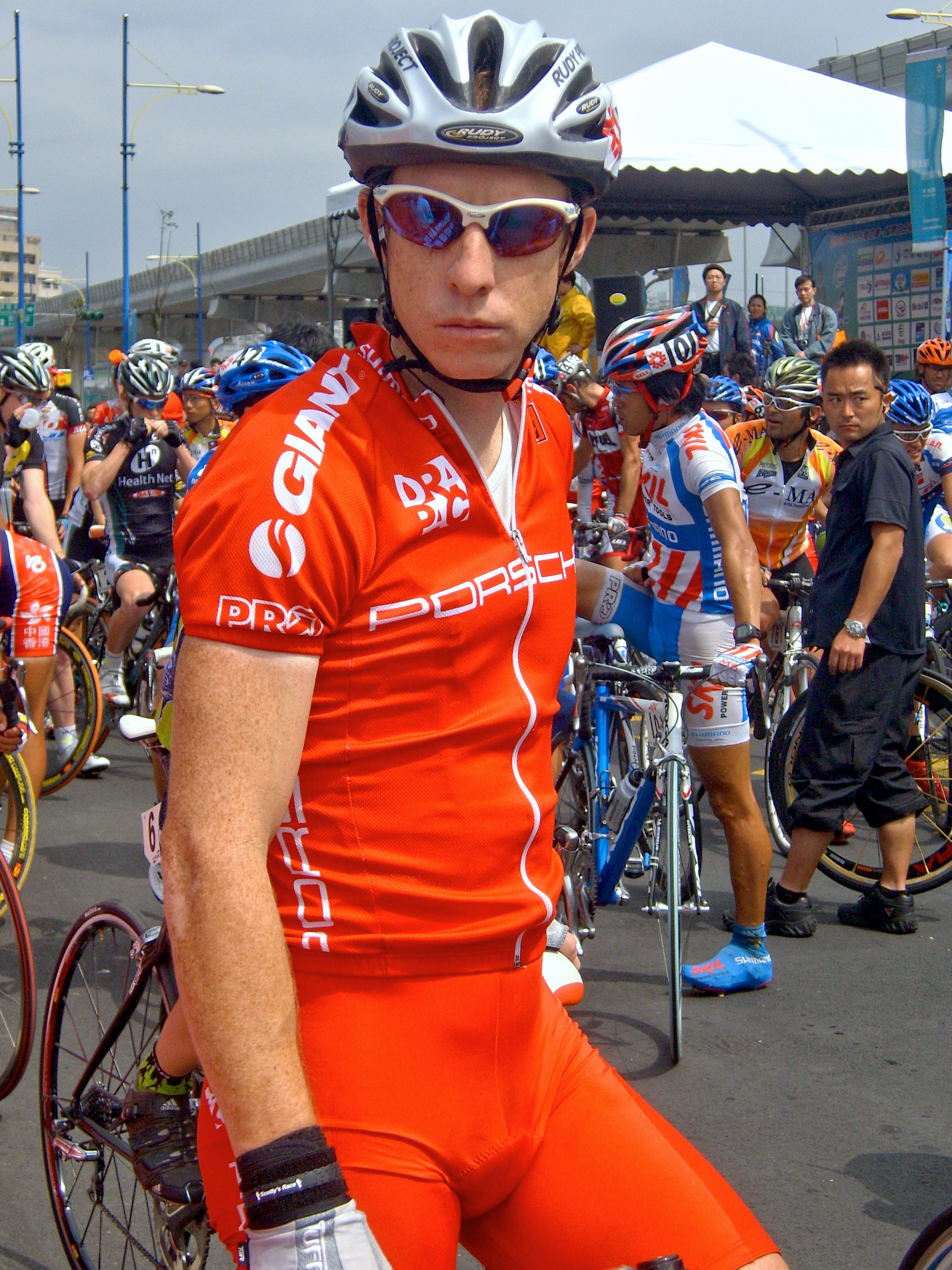

Personal information
- Full name: Peter McDonald
- Born: 22 September 1978 (age 48) Coonabarabran, Australia

Cycling career
- Sport: Cycling
- Discipline: Road
- Role: Rider

Professional teams
- 2006–2007: FRF Couriers–Caravello
- 2008–2010: Drapac–Porsche Development Program
- 2011: V Australia
- 2012: Plan B Racing Team

Major wins
- National Road Race Championships (2009)

Peter McDonald (22 September 1978 – 10 September 2026) is an Australian former professional road cyclist. He won the Australian National Road Race Championships in 2009.

McDonald grew up in Armidale in country NSW. Both of his parents were school teachers. He worked as a school teacher in Darwin for a couple of years before returning to NSW where he began work as a bicycle courier in Sydney. A fellow courier introduced him to racing at Randwick Botany Cycling Club located at Heffron Park in Sydney's south east. Eventually he began to ride full-time for a number of smaller local teams. Coached by Adam Hogan of Cheeky Transport Bike shop he won Australia's Grafton-Inverell race, and won first National Road series win in Victoria at Bright. This led to riding for the Drapac Porsche team.

== Major results ==
2006
4th Road race, National Road Championships
2007
3rd Overall FBD Insurance Ras
2008
4th Overall Tour de Taiwan

1st Stage 3

7th Overall Tour de Hokkaido

1st Stage 5

2009
1st Overall UCI Oceania Tour
1st Road race, National Road Championships
1st Overall Tour of Wellington

1st Stage 2

2nd Overall Tour de Taiwan
10th Overall Ronde de l'Oise
2010
2nd Japan Cup Cycle Road Race
4th Overall Tour de Langkawi

1st Mountains classification

6th Overall Tour of Wellington

1st Stage 1
