= Richard Lang (cyclist) =

Australian cyclist (born 1989)

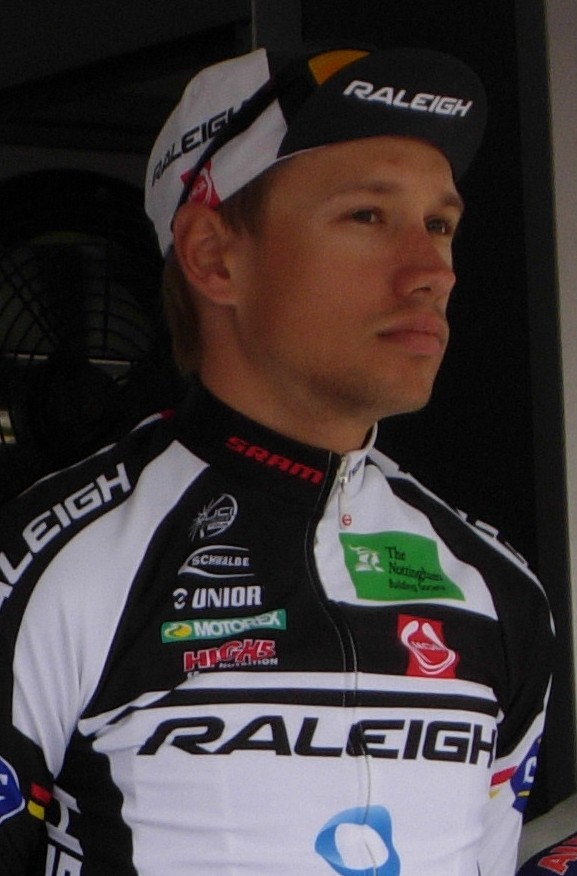
- Lang in 2013

Personal information
- Full name: Richard Lang
- Born: 23 February 1989 (age 37) Sydney, Australia

Cycling career
- Sport: Cycling
- Current team: Retired
- Discipline: Road
- Role: Rider

Professional teams
- 2009: Team Budget Forklifts
- 2010–2011: Team Jayco–AIS
- 2012: Rapha Condor–Sharp
- 2013: Team Raleigh
- 2014–2015: Rapha Condor–JLT

Richard Lang (born 23 February 1989) is an Australian former professional cyclist.

== Major results ==
2009
1st Omnium, National Track Championships
1st Goulburn to Sydney Classic
1st Stage 4 Tour of Gippsland
1st Stage 2 Tour of Geelong
1st Stage 5 Tour of Tasmania
3rd Overall Tour of the Murray River

1st Stage 6

3rd Overall Tour de Perth

1st Stage 1

2010
1st Stage 1 (TTT) Tour of Thuringia
1st Stage 5 Tour of Tasmania
2011
1st Overall UCI Oceania Tour
1st Road race, Oceania Under-23 Road Championships
1st Trofeo Banca Popolare di Vicenza
