= Ruslan Tleubayev =

Kazakhstani cyclist (born 1987)

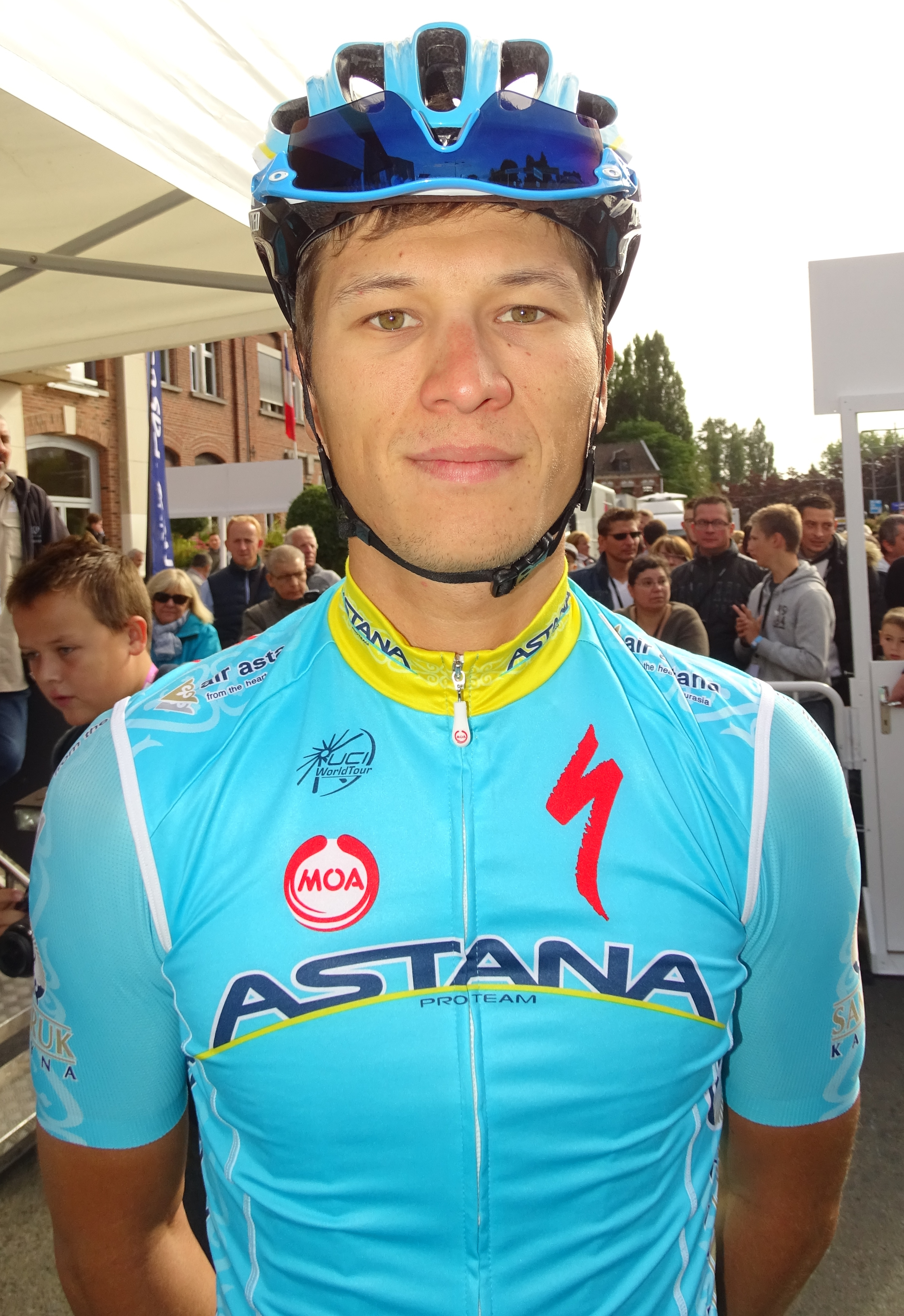
- Tleubayev at the 2015 Grand Prix de Fourmies

Personal information
- Full name: Ruslan Bakhytzhanovich Tleubayev; Russian: Руслан Бахытжанович Тлеубаев
- Born: 3 July 1987 (age 39): Almaty, Kazakh SSR, Soviet Union; (now Kazakhstan)
- Height: 1.78 m (5 ft 10 in)
- Weight: 70 kg (154 lb)

Cycling career
- Sport: Cycling
- Discipline: Road
- Role: Rider
- Rider type: Sprinter

Amateur team
- 2008: Ulan

Professional teams
- 2011: Astana (stagiaire)
- 2012: Continental Team Astana
- 2013–2018: Astana
Medal record
Men's road bicycle racing
Representing Kazakhstan
Asian Championships
Gold medal – first place	2014 Astana	Road race

Ruslan Bakhytzhanovich Tleubayev (Russian: Руслан Бахытжанович Тлеубаев; born 3 July 1987) is a Kazakh former cyclist, who competed professionally for the Astana team between 2013 and 2018.

== Major results ==
2009
10th Giro del Belvedere
2010
5th Road race, Asian Road Championships
6th Overall The Paths of King Nikola
7th Overall Tour of Hainan
2011
3rd Road race, National Road Championships
8th Overall Grand Prix of Sochi

1st Stage 5

8th Grand Prix of Moscow
2012
1st Coppa della Pace
1st Stage 2a Vuelta a la Independencia Nacional
1st Stage 3 Girobio
1st Stage 1 Tour Alsace
4th Overall Tour de Normandie

1st Points classification
1st Mountains classification

5th Race Horizon Park
6th Overall Circuit des Ardennes
6th Grand Prix de la ville de Nogent-sur-Oise
6th Zellik–Galmaarden
2013
3rd Tour of Almaty
2014
1st Road race, Asian Road Championships
5th Road race, Asian Games
2016
1st Stage 2 Tour of Hainan
