= Alex Candelario =

American bicycle racer (born 1975)

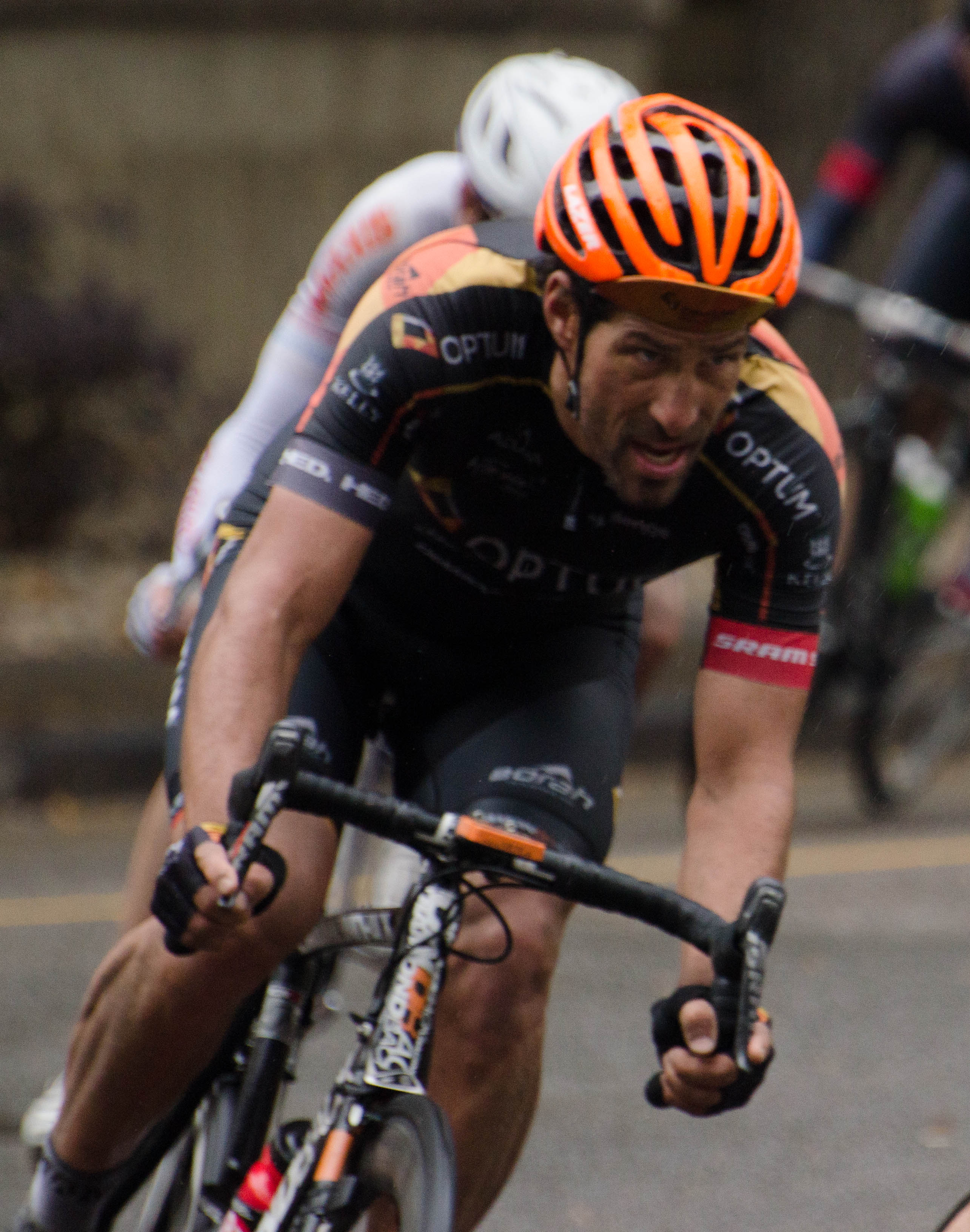
- Candelario at the 2014 Tour of Alberta

Personal information
- Full name: Alex Candelario
- Born: February 26, 1975 (age 51) Las Vegas, Nevada, U.S.

Cycling career
- Sport: Cycling
- Current team: Retired
- Discipline: Road
- Role: Rider

Professional teams
- 2002–2003: Prime Alliance
- 2004–2007: Jelly Belly–Aramark
- 2008–2014: Kelly Benefit Strategies–Medifast

Alex Candelario (born February 26, 1975) is an American former professional cyclist. After retiring from cycling, Candelario formed Big Island Bike Tours, a bicycle touring company on the island of Hawaii.

== Major results ==
2003
1st Stage 6 Cascade Cycling Classic
2004
1st Stage 4 Redlands Bicycle Classic
1st Stage 6 Cascade Cycling Classic
2005
1st Stage 17 International Cycling Classic
1st Stage 4 Tour de Nez
2006
International Cycling Classic

1st Stages 16 & 17

2007
1st Overall Tour de Nez

1st Stage 1

2008
2nd Criterium, National Road Championships
3rd Overall U.S. Air Force Classic
2010
2nd Road race, National Road Championships
3rd Overall Bucks County Classic
2012
2nd Overall Tour de Korea

1st Stage 2
