= Gong Hyo-suk =

South Korean bicycle racer

Personal information
- Full name: Gong Hyo-suk; Korean: 공효석
- Born: January 1, 1986 (age 40) South Korea

Cycling career
- Sport: Cycling
- Discipline: Road
- Role: Rider

Professional teams
- 2008–2010: Seoul Cycling Team
- 2011–2013: Geumsan Ginseng Asia
- 2015–2016: KSPO
- 2017: Terengganu Cycling Team
- 2018: UijeongBu Cycling Team
- 2019–2020: LX Cycling Team

Gong Hyo-suk (Korean: 공효석; born 1 January 1986) is a South Korean cyclist, who most recently rode for UCI Continental team LX Cycling Team. He is married to fencing star Nam Hyun-hee.

== Major results ==
2009
2nd Overall Tour of Japan
2010
Tour de Korea

1st Stages 6 & 9

2nd Overall Tour de Langkawi
2012
2nd Road race, National Road Championships
