= Bermuda Bicycle Association =

Bicycle association in Bermuda

The Bermuda Bicycle Association or BBA is the national governing body of cycle racing in Bermuda.

The BBA is a member of the UCI and COPACI.
