= René Haselbacher =

Austrian cyclist (born 1977)

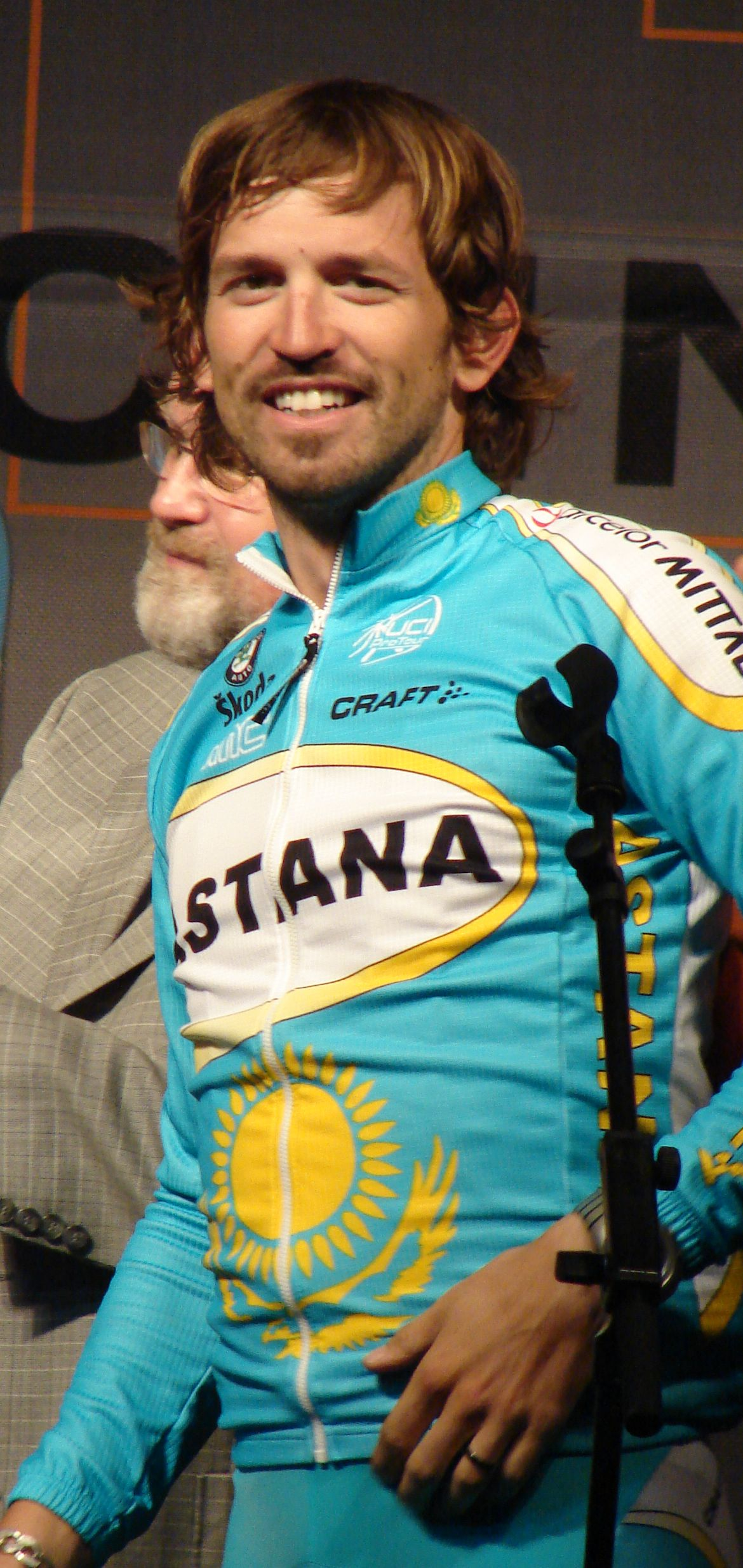

Personal information
- Full name: René Haselbacher
- Born: 15 September 1977 (age 49) Vienna, Austria
- Height: 1.81 m (5 ft 11 in)
- Weight: 68 kg (150 lb)

Cycling career
- Sport: Cycling
- Discipline: Road
- Role: Retired

Professional teams
- 1999–2006: Gerolsteiner
- 2007–2008: Astana
- 2009–2010: Vorarlberg–Corratec

Major wins
- National Champion (2002); Rheinland-Pfalz Rundfahrt (2006)

René Haselbacher (born 15 September 1977 in Vienna) is an Austrian retired professional road bicycle racer. He rode for major teams Gerolsteiner and Astana, and took national titles in both road racing and the time trial. He won the Austrian National Road Race Championships in 2002. He left Vorarlberg–Corratec in the summer of 2010, and retired the following year, when he moved to South Africa.

== Major results ==
- Rheinland-Pfalz Rundfahrt (2006)
  - 1 stage (2003–2006)
- Austria Road Race Champion (2002)
- PostGirot Open - 1 stage (2002)
- Dekra Open - 1 stage (1999)
