= René Weissinger =

German bicycle racer

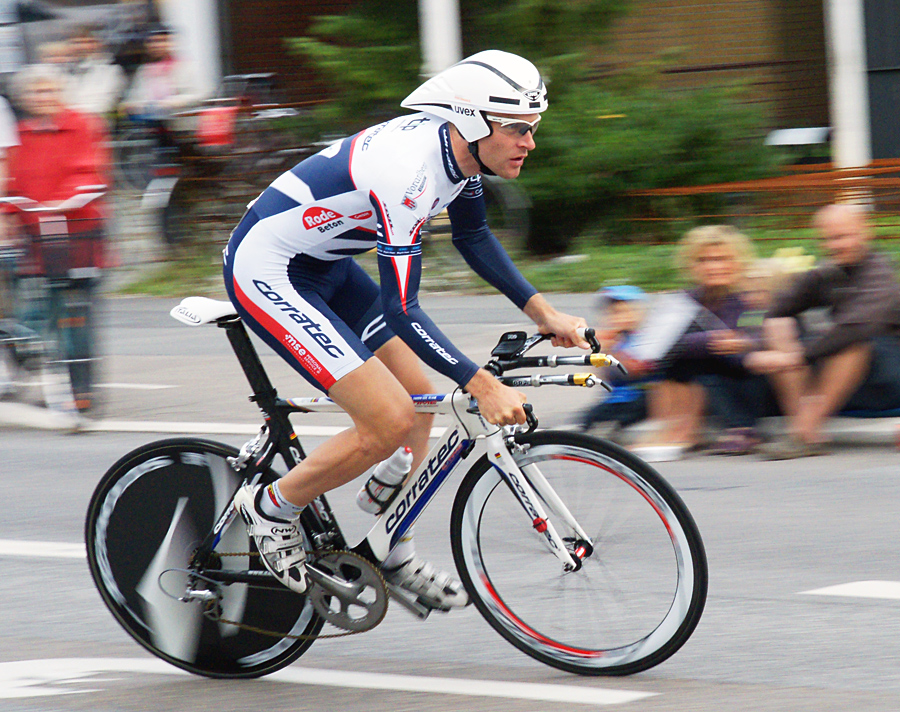

Personal information
- Full name: René Weissinger
- Born: 11 December 1978 (age 47) Böblingen, West Germany

Cycling career
- Sport: Cycling
- Current team: Retired
- Discipline: Road
- Role: Rider

Amateur teams
- 2013: Bike Sport Herpersdorf
- 2013: Team Marinbikes

Professional teams
- 2002: Team Rothaus
- 2003: Vermarc Sportswear
- 2004–2005: Volksbank–Ideal Leingrüber
- 2006: Skil–Shimano
- 2007–2012: Team Volksbank

René Weissinger (born 11 December 1978 in Böblingen) is a German former professional cyclist.

== Major results ==
2000
3rd Grand Prix Waregem
2001
1st National Hill Climb Championships
2003
3rd National Hill Climb Championships
2004
1st Haid-Ansfelden
3rd National Hill Climb Championships
2005
1st Tour de Berne
1st Völkermarkter Radsporttage
1st GP Voralberg
2006
Tour of Qinghai Lake

1st Stages 1 & 2

2008
1st Points classification Tour de Suisse
