= Drapac Cannondale Holistic Development Team =

Australian cycling team

Drapac–EF p/b Cannondale Holistic Development Team

Team information
- UCI code: DCC
- Registered: Australia
- Founded: 2004
- Disbanded: 2019
- Discipline: Road
- Status: National (2004–2005); UCI Continental (2006–2013); UCI Professional Continental (2014–2016); UCI Continental (2017–2019)
- Bicycles: Cannondale
- Website: Team home page

Key personnel
- Team managers: Agostino Giramondo; Tom Southam

Team name history
- 2004 2005 2006 2007–2008 2009–2010 2011–2016 2017 2018 2019: Drapac Development Program; MG Xpower–BigPond; Drapac–Porsche; Drapac–Porsche Development Program; Drapac–Porsche Cycling; Drapac Professional Cycling; Drapac–Pat's Veg Holistic Development Team; Drapac–EF p/b Cannondale Holistic Development Team; Drapac Cannondale Holistic Development Team
Drapac Cannondale Holistic Development Team jersey
Jersey

Drapac–EF p/b Cannondale Holistic Development Team (UCI team code: DPV) was an Australian UCI Continental cycling team focusing on road bicycle racing. It was founded in 2004 by Michael Drapac to promote cycling in Australia and became a UCI team in 2006. In November 2013 the team was promoted from UCI Continental to Professional Continental status. In June 2016 it was announced that Drapac would become co-sponsor of the UCI WorldTeam Cannondale for the remainder of the year, before a merger with Drapac Professional Cycling for 2017. The sponsorship deal was agreed for five years, with Michael Drapac becoming a joint owner of the Cannondale team's holding company Slipstream Sports and continuing to fund a development squad under the name Drapac–Pat's Veg.

The team announced that 2019 would be their final season before ceasing operations.

== Team roster ==
Rider	Date of birth
Tom Kaesler (AUS)	1 March 1995 (age 31)
Liam Magennis (AUS)	14 March 1997 (age 29)
Ryan Thomas (AUS)	2 February 1995 (age 31)
Oliver Martin (AUS)	23 June 1995 (age 31)
Jensen Plowright (AUS)	15 May 2000 (age 26)
Thomas Bolton (AUS)	20 November 1998 (age 27)

Rider	Date of birth
Zachary Johnson (AUS)	4 April 2000 (age 26)
Patrick Burt (AUS)	26 May 1996 (age 30)
Liam White (AUS)	9 November 1994 (age 31)
Theodore Yates (AUS)	28 February 1995 (age 31)

== Major wins ==
2006
Stage 2 Tour of Wellington, Stuart Shaw
Stages 1, 2, 3 & 7, Tour de Taiwan, Robert McLachlan
Overall Tour of Chongming Island, Robert McLachlan

Stage 1 & 3, Robert McLachlan

Stage 1 & 5 Tour de Korea, Stuart Shaw
Stage 2 & 6 Tour de Korea, Robert McLachlan
Stage 7 Tour de Korea, Darren Lapthorne
Melbourne to Warrnambool Classic, Robert McLachlan
Stage 3 Tour of Southland, Robert McLachlan
2007
Stage 6 Tour de Taiwan, Robert McLachlan
Stage 3 Tour de Hokkaido, Mitchell Docker
Stage 5 Tour de Hokkaido, Darren Lapthorne
2008
Stage 3 Tour de Taiwan, Peter McDonald
Stage 5 Tour de East Java, Mitchell Docker
Stage 5 Tour de Hokkaido, Peter McDonald
2009
Overall Tour of Wellington, Peter McDonald

Stage 2, Peter McDonald

Stage 1 Tour de Gironde, Stuart Shaw
Stage 1 Tour de Okinawa, Thomas Palmer
2010
Stage 1 Tour of Wellington, Peter McDonald
Stage 7 Tour de Langkawi, Stuart Shaw
Stage 1 Tour de Okinawa, Thomas Palmer
2nd Japan Cup, Peter McDonald
Melbourne to Warrnambool Classic, Rhys Pollock
2011
Prologue Tour de Taiwan, Adam Phelan
Stage 4 Tour de Taiwan, Floris Goesinnen
Stages 6 & 9 Tour de Taiwan, Adam Semple
Stage 6 Tour de Korea, Muhamad Othman
Stage 1 Tour de Brunei, Muhamad Othman
Stage 1 Herald Sun Tour, Rhys Pollock
2012
Stage 4 New Zealand Cycle Classic, Thomas Palmer
Overall Tour de Taiwan, Rhys Pollock
Stage 2 Flèche du Sud, Floris Goesinnen
Tour de Okinawa, Thomas Palmer
2013
Stage 5 New Zealand Cycle Classic, Thomas Palmer
Overall Tour de Taiwan, Bernard Sulzberger
2014
Stages 2 & 4 New Zealand Cycle Classic, Wouter Wippert
Stage 3 Tour de Taiwan, Wouter Wippert
Stage 1 (ITT) Tour of Japan, Will Clarke
Stage 2 Tour of Japan, Wouter Wippert
Prologue Tour de Kumano, Will Clarke
Stages 1 & 3, Tour de Kumano, Wouter Wippert
Stage 2 Tour of Iran, Will Clarke
Stage 4 Tour of China II, Wouter Wippert
Stage 9 Tour of Hainan, Wouter Wippert
2015
Stage 6 Tour Down Under, Wouter Wippert
Prologue Herald Sun Tour, Will Clarke
Stages 1 & 3 Tour de Taiwan, Wouter Wippert
Stage 1 (ITT) Tour of Japan, Brenton Jones
Stages 1 & 6 Tour de Korea, Wouter Wippert
Stage 7 Tour of Utah, Lachlan Norris
Stage 9 Tour of Hainan, Brenton Jones
2016
Stage 3 Tour de San Luis, Peter Koning
Prologue Herald Sun Tour, Will Clarke
Stages 1 & 4 Tour de Taiwan, Will Clarke
Stage 2 Tour of Iran, Peter Koning
Stage 3 Boucles de la Mayenne, Thomas Scully
Stages 4 & 8 Tour de Korea, Brenton Jones
Stage 7 Tour de Korea, Brad Evans
Prologue Tour of Austria, William Clarke
Stage 3 Tour of Austria, Brendan Canty
Stage 3 Volta a Portugal, William Clarke
2019
Stage 3 New Zealand Cycle Classic, Jensen Plowright
Stage 5 New Zealand Cycle Classic, Theodore Yates
U23 Oceania Road Cycling Championships, Liam Magennis

== National champions ==
2007
Australia Road Race, Darren Lapthorne
2009
Australia Road Race, Peter McDonald
2010
Malaysia Road Race, Muhamad Othman
2018
Australia U23 Road Race, Cyrus Monk
2019
Australia U23 Time Trial, Liam Magennis
