= Team Jayco–AIS =

Team information
- UCI code: JAI
- Registered: Australia
- Founded: 2006
- Disbanded: 2012
- Discipline: Road
- Status: Defunct

Key personnel
- General manager: Kevin Tabotta

Team name history
- 2006–2008 2009 2010 2011 2012: Southaustralia.com–AIS; Team AIS; Team Jayco–Skins; Jayco–AIS; Team Jayco–AIS

Team Jayco–AIS (UCI team code: JAI) was an Australian road cycling team. The team was sponsored by the Australian division of recreational vehicle company Jayco and the Australian Institute of Sport. Jayco Australia's founder Gerry Ryan now funds Team Jayco AlUla, a fellow Australian team that started in 2012, the same year Team Jayco–AIS folded. The team competed on the UCI Continental Tour mostly on the Oceania and Europe circuit. The team functioned as a launchpad for young Australian cyclists.

== Team Jayco–AIS riders ==
- Jack Bobridge (2008–2009)
- Simon Clarke (2006–2008)
- Rohan Dennis (2009–2010, 2012)
- Luke Durbridge (2010–2011)
- Matthew Goss (2006)
- Michael Hepburn (2010–2011)
- Leigh Howard (2009)
- Damien Howson (2011–2012)
- Michael Matthews (2009–2010)
- Jay McCarthy (2011–2012)
- Travis Meyer (2008–2009)
- Glenn O'Shea (2009–2012)
- Wesley Sulzberger (2006–2008)
- Calvin Watson (2012)
