= List of teams and cyclists in the 2024 Tour de France Femmes =

List of cyclists

The following is a list of teams and riders that will participate in the 2024 Tour de France Femmes.

== Teams ==
22 teams will participate in the race. The teams were announced on 24 April 2024. All 15 UCI Women's WorldTeams were automatically invited. They were joined by seven UCI Women's Continental Teams – the two best 2023 UCI Women's Continental Teams (Cofidis Women Team and Tashkent City Women Professional Cycling Team) received an automatic invitation, and the other five teams were selected by ASO, the organisers of the Tour. A total of 154 riders from 30 nationalities will start the race, with the Netherlands having the largest contingent (32 riders).

UCI Women's WorldTeams

- AG Insurance–Soudal
- Canyon//SRAM
- Ceratizit–WNT Pro Cycling
- FDJ–Suez
- Fenix–Deceuninck
- Human Powered Health
- Lidl–Trek
- Liv AlUla Jayco
- Movistar Team
- Roland
- Team dsm–firmenich PostNL
- Team SD Worx–Protime
- UAE Team ADQ
- Visma–Lease a Bike
- Uno-X Mobility

UCI Women's Continental Teams

- Arkéa–B&B Hotels Women
- Cofidis
- EF–Oatly–Cannondale
- Laboral Kutxa–Fundación Euskadi
- Lotto–Dstny Ladies
- St. Michel–Mavic–Auber93
- Tashkent City Women Professional Cycling Team

== Cyclists ==
Legend
No.	Starting number worn by the rider during the Tour
Pos.	Position in the general classification
Time	Deficit to the winner of the general classification
‡	Denotes riders born on or after 1 January 2002 eligible for the young rider classification
General classification	Denotes the winner of the general classification
Points classification	Denotes the winner of the points classification
Mountains classification	Denotes the winner of the mountains classification
Young rider classification	Denotes the winner of the young rider classification (eligibility indicated by ‡)
Team classification	Denotes riders that represent the winner of the team classification
Super-combativity award	Denotes the winner of the super-combativity award
DNS	Denotes a rider who did not start a stage, followed by the stage before which she withdrew
DNF	Denotes a rider who did not finish a stage, followed by the stage in which she withdrew
DSQ	Denotes a rider who was disqualified from the race, followed by the stage in which this occurred
OTL	Denotes a rider finished outside the time limit, followed by the stage in which they did so
Ages correct as of Monday 12 August 2024, the date on which the Tour began

=== By starting number ===
No.	Name	Nationality	Team	Age	Pos.	Time	Ref.
1	Demi Vollering	Netherlands	Team SD Worx–Protime	27	2	+ 4"	
2	Mischa Bredewold	Netherlands	Team SD Worx–Protime	24	54	+ 1h 03' 55"	
3	Niamh Fisher-Black	New Zealand	Team SD Worx–Protime	24	14	+ 11' 39"	
4	Barbara Guarischi	Italy	Team SD Worx–Protime	33	DNF-7	–	
5	Christine Majerus	Luxembourg	Team SD Worx–Protime	37	58	+ 1h 07' 30"	
6	Blanka Vas	Hungary	Team SD Worx–Protime	22	63	+ 1h 11' 37"	
7	Lorena Wiebes	Netherlands	Team SD Worx–Protime	25	62	+ 1h 09' 41"	
11	Katarzyna Niewiadoma	Poland	Canyon//SRAM	29	1	24h 36' 07"	
12	Neve Bradbury ‡	Australia	Canyon//SRAM	22	32	+ 31' 33"	
13	Elise Chabbey	Switzerland	Canyon//SRAM	31	DNS-4	–	
14	Chloé Dygert	United States	Canyon//SRAM	27	DNF-8	–	
15	Soraya Paladin	Italy	Canyon//SRAM	31	77	+ 1h 21' 31"	
16	Agnieszka Skalniak-Sójka	Poland	Canyon//SRAM	27	87	+ 1h 34' 01"	
17	Alice Towers ‡	Great Britain	Canyon//SRAM	21	89	+ 1h 34' 42"	
21	Juliette Labous	France	Team dsm–firmenich PostNL	25	9	+ 8' 07"	
22	Francesca Barale ‡	Italy	Team dsm–firmenich PostNL	21	51	+ 1h 00' 19"	
23	Rachele Barbieri	Italy	Team dsm–firmenich PostNL	27	99	+ 1h 45' 28"	
24	Pfeiffer Georgi	Great Britain	Team dsm–firmenich PostNL	23	DNF-5	–	
25	Franziska Koch	Germany	Team dsm–firmenich PostNL	24	50	+ 57' 35"	
26	Charlotte Kool	Netherlands	Team dsm–firmenich PostNL	25	DNF-7	–	
27	Becky Storrie	Great Britain	Team dsm–firmenich PostNL	25	DNF-7	–	
31	Gaia Realini	Italy	Lidl–Trek	23	5	+ 2' 19"	
32	Elisa Balsamo	Italy	Lidl–Trek	26	61	+ 1h 09' 35"	
33	Lucinda Brand	Netherlands	Lidl–Trek	35	8	+ 8' 06"	
34	Elizabeth Deignan	Great Britain	Lidl–Trek	35	74	+ 1h 19' 07"	
35	Amanda Spratt	Australia	Lidl–Trek	36	DNF-7	–	
36	Shirin van Anrooij ‡	Netherlands	Lidl–Trek	22	13	+ 9' 35"	
37	Ellen van Dijk	Netherlands	Lidl–Trek	37	59	+ 1h 08' 38"	
41	Justine Ghekiere	Belgium	AG Insurance–Soudal	28	30	+ 26' 53"	
42	Gaia Masetti	Italy	AG Insurance–Soudal	22	60	+ 1h 09' 21"	
43	Sarah Gigante	Australia	AG Insurance–Soudal	23	7	+ 7' 09"	
44	Kimberley Le Court	Mauritius	AG Insurance–Soudal	28	36	+ 39' 14"	
45	Anya Louw	Australia	AG Insurance–Soudal	23	DNF-7	–	
46	Ilse Pluimers ‡	Netherlands	AG Insurance–Soudal	22	DNF-8	–	
47	Julie Van de Velde	Belgium	AG Insurance–Soudal	31	33	+ 33' 31"	
51	Évita Muzic	France	FDJ–Suez	25	4	+ 1' 21"	
52	Loes Adegeest	Netherlands	FDJ–Suez	28	53	+ 1h 01' 47"	
53	Grace Brown	Australia	FDJ–Suez	32	27	+ 23' 12"	
54	Léa Curinier	France	FDJ–Suez	23	19	+ 14' 40"	
55	Coralie Demay	France	FDJ–Suez	31	84	+ 1h 31' 59"	
56	Amber Kraak	Netherlands	FDJ–Suez	30	37	+ 42' 06"	
57	Cecilie Uttrup Ludwig	Denmark	FDJ–Suez	28	28	+ 24' 22"	
61	Marianne Vos	Netherlands	Visma–Lease a Bike	37	31	+ 27' 46"	
62	Femke de Vries	Netherlands	Visma–Lease a Bike	30	55	+ 1h 04' 18"	
63	Anna Henderson	Great Britain	Visma–Lease a Bike	25	DNF-7	–	
64	Riejanne Markus	Netherlands	Visma–Lease a Bike	29	44	+ 52' 08"	
65	Linda Riedmann ‡	Germany	Visma–Lease a Bike	21	72	+ 1h 17' 41"	
66	Fem van Empel ‡	Netherlands	Visma–Lease a Bike	21	43	+ 51' 27"	
67	Sophie von Berswordt	Netherlands	Visma–Lease a Bike	28	79	+ 1h 22' 02"	
71	Mavi García	Spain	Liv AlUla Jayco	40	26	+ 21' 36"	
72	Caroline Andersson	Sweden	Liv AlUla Jayco	23	34	+ 35' 52"	
73	Jeanne Korevaar	Netherlands	Liv AlUla Jayco	27	103	+ 1h 48' 11"	
74	Amber Pate	Australia	Liv AlUla Jayco	29	DNF-8	–	
75	Ruby Roseman-Gannon	Australia	Liv AlUla Jayco	25	DNS-7	–	
76	Silke Smulders	Netherlands	Liv AlUla Jayco	23	21	+ 15' 37"	
77	Quinty Ton	Netherlands	Liv AlUla Jayco	26	64	+ 1h 12' 36"	
81	Ane Santesteban	Spain	Laboral Kutxa–Fundación Euskadi	33	45	+ 54' 18"	
82	Iurani Blanco	Spain	Laboral Kutxa–Fundación Euskadi	26	85	+ 1h 32' 24"	
83	Usoa Ostolaza	Spain	Laboral Kutxa–Fundación Euskadi	26	24	+ 20' 37"	
84	Debora Silvestri	Italy	Laboral Kutxa–Fundación Euskadi	26	DNF-4	–	
85	Catalina Anais Soto	Chile	Laboral Kutxa–Fundación Euskadi	23	67	+ 1h 13' 32"	
86	Laura Tomasi	Italy	Laboral Kutxa–Fundación Euskadi	25	68	+ 1h 13' 55"	
87	Cristina Tonetti ‡	Italy	Laboral Kutxa–Fundación Euskadi	22	100	+ 1h 46' 16"	
91	Cédrine Kerbaol	France	Ceratizit–WNT Pro Cycling	23	6	+ 2' 51"	
92	Sandra Alonso	Spain	Ceratizit–WNT Pro Cycling	25	83	+ 1h 25' 55"	
93	Alice Maria Arzuffi	Italy	Ceratizit–WNT Pro Cycling	29	20	+ 14' 47"	
94	Nina Berton	Luxembourg	Ceratizit–WNT Pro Cycling	23	98	+ 1h 44' 29"	
95	Mylène de Zoete	Netherlands	Ceratizit–WNT Pro Cycling	25	107	+ 2h 00' 16"	
96	Marta Lach	Poland	Ceratizit–WNT Pro Cycling	27	DNS-6	–	
97	Kathrin Schweinberger	Austria	Ceratizit–WNT Pro Cycling	27	96	+ 1h 44' 21"	
101	Kristen Faulkner	United States	EF–Oatly–Cannondale	31	38	+ 43' 36"	
103	Clara Emond	Canada	EF–Oatly–Cannondale	27	DNS-4	–	
104	Lotta Henttala	Finland	EF–Oatly–Cannondale	35	97	+ 1h 44' 27"	
105	Alison Jackson	Canada	EF–Oatly–Cannondale	35	105	+ 1h 50' 20"	
106	Noemi Rüegg	Switzerland	EF–Oatly–Cannondale	23	42	+ 49' 58"	
107	Magdeleine Vallieres	Canada	EF–Oatly–Cannondale	23	DNF-5	–	
111	Liane Lippert	Germany	Movistar Team	26	18	+ 14' 22"	
112	Olivia Baril	Canada	Movistar Team	26	41	+ 49' 23"	
113	Emma Norsgaard	Denmark	Movistar Team	25	76	+ 1h 20' 46"	
114	Sheyla Gutiérrez	Spain	Movistar Team	30	DNS-8	–	
115	Floortje Mackaij	Netherlands	Movistar Team	28	52	+ 1h 01' 18"	
116	Sara Martín	Spain	Movistar Team	25	46	+ 54' 24"	
117	Mareille Meijering	Netherlands	Movistar Team	29	15	+ 11' 49"	
121	Silvia Persico	Italy	UAE Team ADQ	27	69	+ 1h 14' 27"	
122	Karolina Kumięga	Poland	UAE Team ADQ	25	80	+ 1h 22' 36"	
123	Sofia Bertizzolo	Italy	UAE Team ADQ	26	DNS-7	–	
124	Mikayla Harvey	New Zealand	UAE Team ADQ	25	82	+ 1h 25' 35"	
125	Elizabeth Holden	Great Britain	UAE Team ADQ	26	78	+ 1h 21' 48"	
126	Erica Magnaldi	Italy	UAE Team ADQ	31	12	+ 9' 16"	
127	Karlijn Swinkels	Netherlands	UAE Team ADQ	25	39	+ 44' 57"	
131	Yara Kastelijn	Netherlands	Fenix–Deceuninck	27	57	+ 1h 05' 12"	
132	Julie De Wilde ‡	Belgium	Fenix–Deceuninck	21	86	+ 1h 33' 40"	
133	Puck Pieterse ‡	Netherlands	Fenix–Deceuninck	22	11	+ 8' 28"	
134	Pauliena Rooijakkers	Netherlands	Fenix–Deceuninck	31	3	+ 10"	
135	Carina Schrempf	Austria	Fenix–Deceuninck	29	88	+ 1h 34' 12"	
136	Christina Schweinberger	Austria	Fenix–Deceuninck	27	DNS-4	–	
137	Marthe Truyen	Belgium	Fenix–Deceuninck	24	90	+ 1h 36' 19"	
141	Victoire Berteau	France	Cofidis	23	66	+ 1h 13' 02"	
142	Martina Alzini	Italy	Cofidis	27	DNF-4	–	
143	Špela Kern	Slovenia	Cofidis	34	DNF-5	–	
144	Hannah Ludwig	Germany	Cofidis	24	23	+ 20' 35"	
145	Nikola Nosková	Czechia	Cofidis	27	91	+ 1h 37' 44"	
146	Sarah Roy	Australia	Cofidis	38	70	+ 1h 15' 52"	
147	Josie Talbot	Australia	Cofidis	28	DNS-8	–	
151	Audrey Cordon-Ragot	France	Human Powered Health	34	93	+ 1h 40' 12"	
152	Ruth Edwards	United States	Human Powered Health	31	DNF-8	–	
153	Romy Kasper	Germany	Human Powered Health	36	92	+ 1h 38' 36"	
154	Barbara Malcotti	Italy	Human Powered Health	24	DNS-8	–	
155	Daria Pikulik	Poland	Human Powered Health	27	DNF-4	–	
156	Marit Raaijmakers	Netherlands	Human Powered Health	25	DNS-8	–	
157	Lily Williams	United States	Human Powered Health	30	DNS-7	–	
161	Marion Bunel ‡	France	St. Michel–Mavic–Auber93	19	17	+ 12' 40"	
162	Alison Avoine	France	St. Michel–Mavic–Auber93	24	DNF-8	–	
163	Camille Fahy ‡	France	St. Michel–Mavic–Auber93	21	DNF-8	–	
164	Victorie Guilman	France	St. Michel–Mavic–Auber93	28	35	+ 38' 22"	
165	Célia Le Mouel	France	St. Michel–Mavic–Auber93	24	65	+ 1h 12' 53"	
166	Dilyxine Miermont	France	St. Michel–Mavic–Auber93	24	DNS-3	–	
167	Elyne Roussel ‡	France	St. Michel–Mavic–Auber93	18	DNF-4	–	
171	Valentina Cavallar	Austria	Arkéa–B&B Hotels Women	23	22	+ 16' 55"	
172	Lotte Claes	Belgium	Arkéa–B&B Hotels Women	31	16	+ 12' 09"	
173	Maaike Coljé	Netherlands	Arkéa–B&B Hotels Women	27	49	+ 57' 02"	
174	Michaela Drummond	New Zealand	Arkéa–B&B Hotels Women	26	106	+ 1h 53' 39"	
175	Emilia Fahlin	Sweden	Arkéa–B&B Hotels Women	35	101	+ 1h 47' 31"	
176	Amandine Fouquenet	France	Arkéa–B&B Hotels Women	23	104	+ 1h 49' 35"	
177	Maëva Squiban ‡	France	Arkéa–B&B Hotels Women	22	40	+ 47' 20"	
181	Thalita de Jong	Netherlands	Lotto–Dstny Ladies	30	10	+ 8' 12"	
182	Wilma Aintila ‡	Finland	Lotto–Dstny Ladies	20	109	+ 2h 12' 39"	
183	Maureen Arens ‡	Netherlands	Lotto–Dstny Ladies	21	95	+ 1h 42' 32"	
184	Fauve Bastiaenssen	Belgium	Lotto–Dstny Ladies	26	110	+ 2h 14' 25"	
185	Audrey De Keersmaeker	Belgium	Lotto–Dstny Ladies	25	71	+ 1h 16' 15"	
186	Mieke Docx	Belgium	Lotto–Dstny Ladies	28	DNF-7	–	
187	Anna van Wersch	Netherlands	Lotto–Dstny Ladies	22	73	+ 1h 18' 55"	
191	Katrine Aalerud	Norway	Uno-X Mobility	29	25	+ 20' 48"	
192	Anniina Ahtosalo ‡	Finland	Uno-X Mobility	20	81	+ 1h 22' 56"	
193	Simone Boilard	Canada	Uno-X Mobility	24	48	+ 56' 11"	
194	Maria Giulia Confalonieri	Italy	Uno-X Mobility	31	94	+ 1h 42' 10"	
195	Marte Berg Edseth	Norway	Uno-X Mobility	25	56	+ 1h 04' 37"	
196	Anouska Koster	Netherlands	Uno-X Mobility	30	75	+ 1h 19' 36"	
197	Mie Bjørndal Ottestad	Norway	Uno-X Mobility	27	29	+ 26' 29"	
201	Tamara Dronova		Roland	30	DNF-6	–	
202	Antri Christoforou	Cyprus	Roland	32	DNF-7	–	
203	Maggie Coles-Lyster	Canada	Roland	25	DNF-4	–	
204	Natalie Grinczer	Great Britain	Roland	30	DNF-1	–	
205	Elena Pirrone	Italy	Roland	25	DNF-6	–	
206	Sylvie Swinkels	Netherlands	Roland	24	108	+ 2h 03' 49"	
207	Giorgia Vettorello	Italy	Roland	24	102	+ 1h 47' 56"	
211	Yanina Kuskova	Uzbekistan	Tashkent City Women Professional Cycling Team	22	47	+ 55' 52"	
212	Mohinabonu Elmurodova ‡	Uzbekistan	Tashkent City Women Professional Cycling Team	18	DNF-1	–	
213	Madina Kakharova ‡	Uzbekistan	Tashkent City Women Professional Cycling Team	22	DNF-1	–	
214	Nafosat Kozieva	Uzbekistan	Tashkent City Women Professional Cycling Team	26	DNS-4	–	
215	Ekaterina Knebeleva	Uzbekistan	Tashkent City Women Professional Cycling Team	27	DNF-1	–	
216	Margarita Misyurina ‡	Uzbekistan	Tashkent City Women Professional Cycling Team	21	DNF-4	–	
217	Asal Rizaeva ‡	Uzbekistan	Tashkent City Women Professional Cycling Team	19	DNF-1	–	

=== By team ===
(Netherlands) Team SD Worx–Protime (SDW)
No.	Rider	Pos.
1	Demi Vollering (NED)	2
2	Mischa Bredewold (NED)	54
3	Niamh Fisher-Black (NZL)	14
4	Barbara Guarischi (ITA)	DNF-7
5	Christine Majerus (LUX)	58
6	Blanka Vas (HUN)	63
7	Lorena Wiebes (NED)	62

(Germany) Canyon//SRAM (CSR)
No.	Rider	Pos.
11	Katarzyna Niewiadoma (POL)	1
12	Neve Bradbury (AUS)	32
13	Elise Chabbey (SUI)	DNS-4
14	Chloé Dygert (USA)	DNF-8
15	Soraya Paladin (ITA)	77
16	Agnieszka Skalniak-Sójka (POL)	87
17	Alice Towers (GBR)	89

(Netherlands) Team dsm–firmenich PostNL (DFP)
No.	Rider	Pos.
21	Juliette Labous (FRA)	9
22	Francesca Barale (ITA)	51
23	Rachele Barbieri (ITA)	99
24	Pfeiffer Georgi (GBR)	DNF-5
25	Franziska Koch (GER)	50
26	Charlotte Kool (NED)	DNF-7
27	Becky Storrie (GBR)	DNF-7

(United States) Lidl–Trek (LTK)
No.	Rider	Pos.
31	Gaia Realini (ITA)	5
32	Elisa Balsamo (ITA)	61
33	Lucinda Brand (NED)	8
34	Elizabeth Deignan (GBR)	74
35	Amanda Spratt (AUS)	DNF-7
36	Shirin van Anrooij (NED)	13
37	Ellen van Dijk (NED)	59

(Belgium) AG Insurance–Soudal (AGS)
No.	Rider	Pos.
41	Justine Ghekiere (BEL)	30
42	Gaia Masetti (ITA)	60
43	Sarah Gigante (AUS)	7
44	Kimberley Le Court (MRI)	36
45	Anya Louw (AUS)	DNF-7
46	Ilse Pluimers (NED)	DNF-8
47	Julie Van de Velde (BEL)	33

(France) FDJ–Suez (FSF)
No.	Rider	Pos.
51	Évita Muzic (FRA)	4
52	Loes Adegeest (NED)	53
53	Grace Brown (AUS)	27
54	Léa Curinier (FRA)	19
55	Coralie Demay (FRA)	84
56	Amber Kraak (NED)	37
57	Cecilie Uttrup Ludwig (DEN)	28

(Netherlands) Visma–Lease a Bike (TVL)
No.	Rider	Pos.
61	Marianne Vos (NED)	31
62	Femke de Vries (NED)	55
63	Anna Henderson (GBR)	DNF-7
64	Riejanne Markus (NED)	44
65	Linda Riedmann (GER)	72
66	Fem van Empel (NED)	43
67	Sophie von Berswordt (NED)	79

(Australia) Liv AlUla Jayco (LAJ)
No.	Rider	Pos.
71	Mavi García (ESP)	26
72	Caroline Andersson (SWE)	34
73	Jeanne Korevaar (NED)	103
74	Amber Pate (AUS)	DNF-8
75	Ruby Roseman-Gannon (AUS)	DNS-7
76	Silke Smulders (NED)	21
77	Quinty Ton (NED)	64

(Spain) Laboral Kutxa–Fundación Euskadi (LKF)
No.	Rider	Pos.
81	Ane Santesteban (ESP)	45
82	Iurani Blanco (ESP)	85
83	Usoa Ostolaza (ESP)	24
84	Debora Silvestri (ITA)	DNF-4
85	Catalina Anais Soto (CHI)	67
86	Laura Tomasi (ITA)	68
87	Cristina Tonetti (ITA)	100

(Germany) Ceratizit–WNT Pro Cycling (WNT)
No.	Rider	Pos.
91	Cédrine Kerbaol (FRA)	6
92	Sandra Alonso (ESP)	83
93	Alice Maria Arzuffi (ITA)	20
94	Nina Berton (LUX)	98
95	Mylène de Zoete (NED)	107
96	Marta Lach (POL)	DNS-6
97	Kathrin Schweinberger (AUT)	96

(United States) EF–Oatly–Cannondale (EOC)
No.	Rider	Pos.
101	Kristen Faulkner (USA)	38
103	Clara Emond (CAN)	DNS-4
104	Lotta Henttala (FIN)	97
105	Alison Jackson (CAN)	105
106	Noemi Rüegg (SUI)	42
107	Magdeleine Vallieres (CAN)	DNF-5

(Spain) Movistar Team (MOV)
No.	Rider	Pos.
111	Liane Lippert (GER)	18
112	Olivia Baril (CAN)	41
113	Emma Norsgaard (DEN)	76
114	Sheyla Gutiérrez (ESP)	DNS-8
115	Floortje Mackaij (NED)	52
116	Sara Martín (ESP)	46
117	Mareille Meijering (NED)	15

(United Arab Emirates) UAE Team ADQ (UAD)
No.	Rider	Pos.
121	Silvia Persico (ITA)	69
122	Karolina Kumięga (POL)	80
123	Sofia Bertizzolo (ITA)	DNS-7
124	Mikayla Harvey (NZL)	82
125	Elizabeth Holden (GBR)	78
126	Erica Magnaldi (ITA)	12
127	Karlijn Swinkels (NED)	39

(Belgium) Fenix–Deceuninck (FED)
No.	Rider	Pos.
131	Yara Kastelijn (NED)	57
132	Julie De Wilde (BEL)	86
133	Puck Pieterse (NED)	11
134	Pauliena Rooijakkers (NED)	3
135	Carina Schrempf (AUT)	88
136	Christina Schweinberger (AUT)	DNS-4
137	Marthe Truyen (BEL)	90

(France) Cofidis (COF)
No.	Rider	Pos.
141	Victoire Berteau (FRA)	66
142	Martina Alzini (ITA)	DNF-4
143	Špela Kern (SLO)	DNF-5
144	Hannah Ludwig (GER)	23
145	Nikola Nosková (CZE)	91
146	Sarah Roy (AUS)	70
147	Josie Talbot (AUS)	DNS-8

(United States) Human Powered Health (HPH)
No.	Rider	Pos.
151	Audrey Cordon-Ragot (FRA)	93
152	Ruth Edwards (USA)	DNF-8
153	Romy Kasper (GER)	92
154	Barbara Malcotti (ITA)	DNS-8
155	Daria Pikulik (POL)	DNF-4
156	Marit Raaijmakers (NED)	DNS-8
157	Lily Williams (USA)	DNS-7

(France) St. Michel–Mavic–Auber93 (AUB)
No.	Rider	Pos.
161	Marion Bunel (FRA)	17
162	Alison Avoine (FRA)	DNF-8
163	Camille Fahy (FRA)	DNF-8
164	Victorie Guilman (FRA)	35
165	Célia Le Mouel (FRA)	65
166	Dilyxine Miermont (FRA)	DNS-3
167	Elyne Roussel (FRA)	DNF-4

(France) Arkéa–B&B Hotels Women (ARK)
No.	Rider	Pos.
171	Valentina Cavallar (AUT)	22
172	Lotte Claes (BEL)	16
173	Maaike Coljé (NED)	49
174	Michaela Drummond (NZL)	106
175	Emilia Fahlin (SWE)	101
176	Amandine Fouquenet (FRA)	104
177	Maëva Squiban (FRA)	40

(Belgium) Lotto–Dstny Ladies (LDL)
No.	Rider	Pos.
181	Thalita de Jong (NED)	10
182	Wilma Aintila (FIN)	109
183	Maureen Arens (NED)	95
184	Fauve Bastiaenssen (BEL)	110
185	Audrey De Keersmaeker (BEL)	71
186	Mieke Docx (BEL)	DNF-7
187	Anna van Wersch (NED)	73

(Norway) Uno-X Mobility (UXM)
No.	Rider	Pos.
191	Katrine Aalerud (NOR)	25
192	Anniina Ahtosalo (FIN)	81
193	Simone Boilard (CAN)	48
194	Maria Giulia Confalonieri (ITA)	94
195	Marte Berg Edseth (NOR)	56
196	Anouska Koster (NED)	75
197	Mie Bjørndal Ottestad (NOR)	29

(Switzerland) Roland (CGS)
No.	Rider	Pos.
201	Tamara Dronova	DNF-6
202	Antri Christoforou (CYP)	DNF-7
203	Maggie Coles-Lyster (CAN)	DNF-4
204	Natalie Grinczer (GBR)	DNF-1
205	Elena Pirrone (ITA)	DNF-6
206	Sylvie Swinkels (NED)	108
207	Giorgia Vettorello (ITA)	102

(Uzbekistan) Tashkent City Women Professional Cycling Team (TCW)
No.	Rider	Pos.
211	Yanina Kuskova (UZB)	47
212	Mohinabonu Elmurodova (UZB)	DNF-1
213	Madina Kakharova (UZB)	DNF-1
214	Nafosat Kozieva (UZB)	DNS-4
215	Ekaterina Knebeleva (UZB)	DNF-1
216	Margarita Misyurina (UZB)	DNF-4
217	Asai Rizaeva (UZB)	DNF-1

=== By nationality ===
Country	No. of riders	Finished	Stage wins
Australia	9	4	
Austria	4	3	
Belgium	8	7	1 (Justine Ghekiere)
Canada	6	3	
Chile	1	1	
Cyprus	1	0	
Czechia	1	1	
Denmark	2	2	
Finland	3	3	
France	16	12	1 (Cédrine Kerbaol)
Germany	5	5	
Great Britain	7	3	
Hungary	1	1	1 (Blanka Vas)
Italy	19	13	
Luxembourg	2	2	
Mauritius	1	1	
Netherlands	32	29	5 (Charlotte Kool x2, Puck Pieterse, Demi Vollering x2)
New Zealand	3	3	
Norway	3	3	
Poland	5	3	
Slovenia	1	0	
Spain	7	6	
Sweden	2	2	
Switzerland	2	1	
United States	4	1	
Uzbekistan	7	1	
	1	0	
Total	153	110	8
