= Tour de Perth =

Former road bicycle race in Perth, Western Australia

Race details
- Region: Australia
- Discipline: Road
- Type: Stage race
- Web site: www.tourdeperth.com

History
- First edition: Men's: 2006; Women's: 2007
- Editions: Men's: 6 Women's: 3
- Final edition: 2013
- First winner: Men's; David McKenzie (AUS); Women's; Kathryn Watt (AUS)
- Final winner: Men's; Joseph Cooper (NZL); Women's; Ruth Corset (AUS)

The Tour de Perth was an amateur road bicycle racing stage-race in Australia, established in 2006. There was a women's stage race between 2007 and 2009.

== Honours ==
=== Men's ===
Year	Winner	Second	Third
2006	(Australia) David McKenzie	(Australia) Cameron Meyer	(Australia) Wesley Sulzberger
2007	(Australia) Stuart Shaw	(Australia) Jack Anderson	(Australia) Benjamin King
2008	(Australia) Richie Porte	(Australia) Adam Semple	(Australia) David Kemp
2009	(Australia) Travis Meyer	(Australia) Graeme Brown	(Australia) Richard Lang
2011	(Australia) Cameron Meyer	(Australia) Anthony Giacoppo	(Australia) Adam Semple
2013	(New Zealand) Joseph Cooper	(Australia) Neil Van der Ploeg	(Australia) Jack Haig

=== Women's ===
Year	Winner	Second	Third
2007	(Australia) Kathryn Watt	(Australia) Josephine Tomic	(Australia) Amanda Spratt
2008	(Australia) Josephine Tomic	(Australia) Carly Hibberd	(Australia) Davina Summers
2009	(Australia) Ruth Corset	(Netherlands) Ellen van Dijk	(Australia) Simone Grounds
