= Kimberley Wells =

Australian cyclist

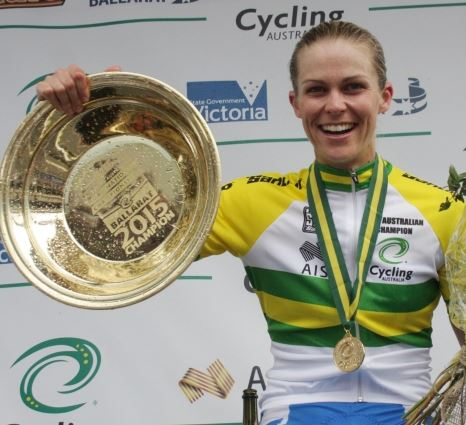
- Wells after winning her 2nd national title in Ballarat (January 2015)

Personal information
- Born: 18 July 1985 (age 41) Coonamble, Australia

Cycling career
- Sport: Cycling
- Discipline: Road
- Role: Rider
- Rider type: Sprinter

Amateur teams
- 2012: Specialized Women SA
- 2013–2014: Specialized Securitor & Roxsolt
- 2015: High 5 Dream Team
- 2017–2018: Holden Women's Racing

Professional teams
- 2013: Team Fearless Femmes
- 2014: Poitou-Charentes.Futuroscope.86
- 2016: Colavita/Bianchi

Major wins
- Australian National Criterium Championships 2013 & 2015

Kimberley Wells (born 18 July 1985) is an Australian racing cyclist, who has represented Australia in the United States, Middle East and Europe. Outside of professional cycling, Wells is a medical doctor working at the Australian Institute of Sport (AIS), as a medical specialist sports physician with the Australasian College of Sport and Exercise Physicians. She obtained her medical degree after six years in far North Queensland through the rural, remote, indigenous and tropical health focus at James Cook University.

Wells was a talented road sprinter and prolific winner. Wells was coached by the 2004 Athens Olympics road race Gold Medalist, Sara Carrigan. She took up cycling seriously at university in 2003 after previously competing at a State level in Cricket and Soccer. Wells successfully completed the Australian Institute of Sport SAS selection camp to win her position within the Australian cycling team on tour in Europe. She was the 2015 Amy Gillett Foundation scholarship holder; the scholarship aspiring to honour Amy’s memory by supporting young women to the same pursuit of sporting and academic excellence. Wells has won two Australian National Criterium titles, her second coming after a coming back from a difficult year of illness and injury.

== Major results ==
2011
1st Overall Tour de Femme
2012
1st Overall Sara Carrigan Shield

1st Sprints classification

1st Overall Tour de Femme
1st Cronulla GP
Santos North Western Tour

1st Stage 4
3rd Criterium

1st Sprints classification Tour of Bright
Battle on the Border

2nd Tweed Road Race
3rd Criterium

2nd Menzies Classic Handicap
3rd Criterium, ACT Road Championships
3rd Criterium, Goldfields Tour
2013
1st Criterium, National Road Championships
1st Overall Santos Women's Cup

1st Stages 1 & 3

1st San Rafael Twilight Criterium
1st Boise Twilight Criterium
1st East Troy Criterium
1st Tour de Somerville
1st Mopro Tour de Grove Criteriums
1st Ron Van Mullica Handicap RR
1st Stage 3 Tour de Elk Grove
1st Sprints classification Nature Valley Stage Race
2nd Overall Tour of America's Dairylands

1st Stages 1 & 4

USA Crits Speedweek

2nd Downtown Walterboro Criterium
2nd Spartanburg Regional Classic
3rd Historic Roswell Criterium

2nd Chris Thater Memorial Race
3rd Overall Bay Classic Series

1st Stage 1

3rd Tour de Grove
3rd N.O.D.A. GP Criterium
2014
1st SKCC Supercrit
1st Launceston Cycling Classic
1st Noosa GP
Oceania Track Championships

2nd Scratch race
3rd Team pursuit (with Emily McRedmond, Alexandria Nicholls and Allison Rice)

2015
1st Criterium, National Road Championships
1st Stan Siejka – Launceston Cycling Classic
1st Stage 2 Trophée d'Or Féminin
Adelaide Tour

1st Stages 3 & 4

Battle on the Border

1st Stages 1 & 4

7th Overall Bay Classic Series
2016
1st Grand Prix Cycliste de Gatineau
BC Superweek

1st Giro di Burnaby
2nd Gastown GP
2nd Port Colquitlam

1st Stage 4 Cascade Cycling Classic
1st Stage 2 Bay Classic Series
2nd GP Lazzeratti Roma
8th Overall Santos Women's Tour

1st Stage 4

8th White Spot / Delta Road Race
2017
1st Overall Tour of Gippsland

1st Stage 3

2018
3rd Criterium, National Road Championships

== See also ==
- Australian National Criterium Championships
