= Carly Hibberd =

Australian cyclist

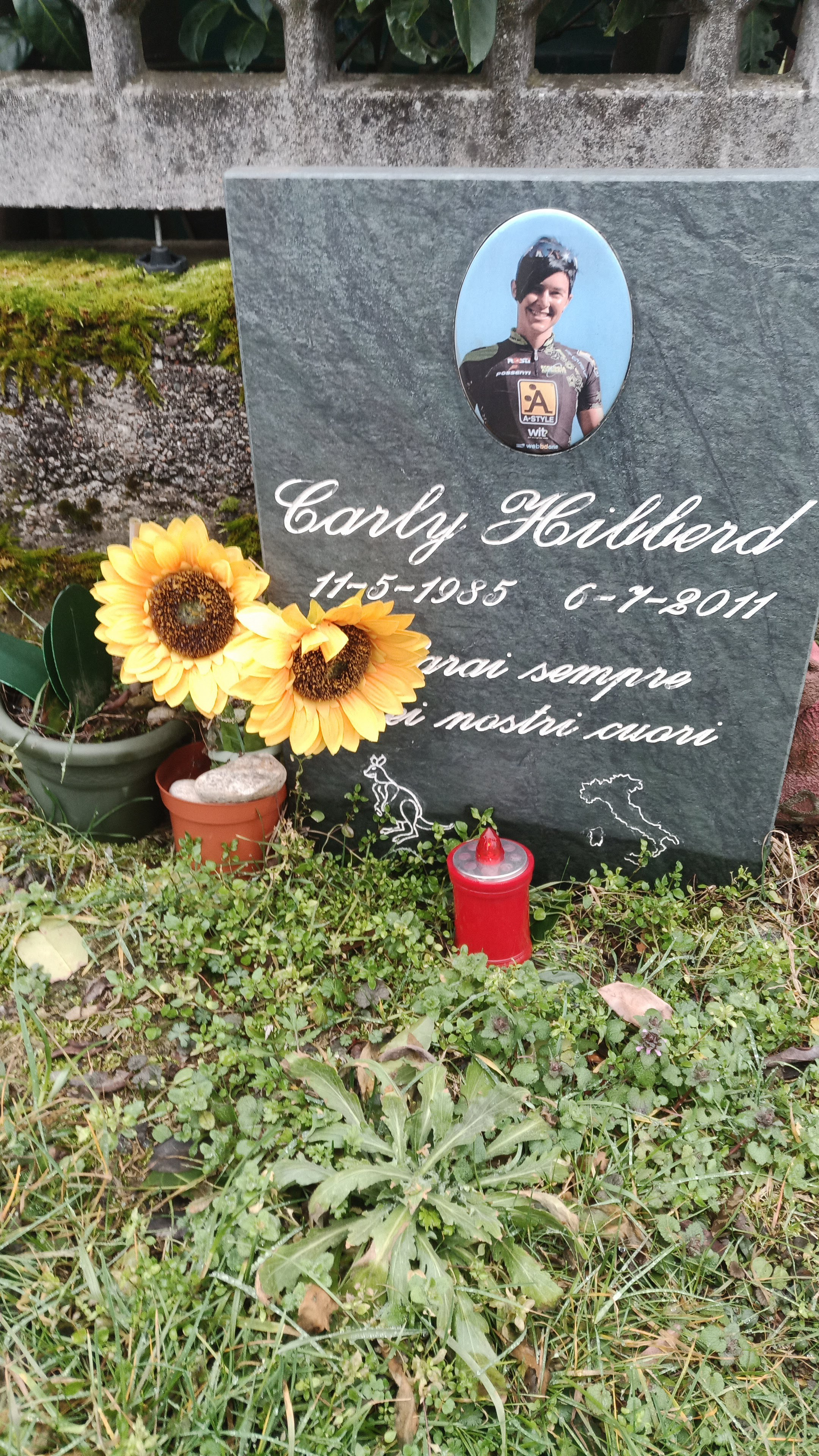

Personal information
- Born: 11 May 1985 Sherwood, Queensland, Australia
- Died: 6 July 2011 (aged 26) Lurate Caccivio, Italy

Cycling career
- Sport: Cycling
- Discipline: Road bicycle racing

Amateur team
- 2006–2008: MBCycles

Professional teams
- 2009–2010: S.C. Michela Fanini Record Rox
- 2011: Cassina Rizzardi A Style Fionucci

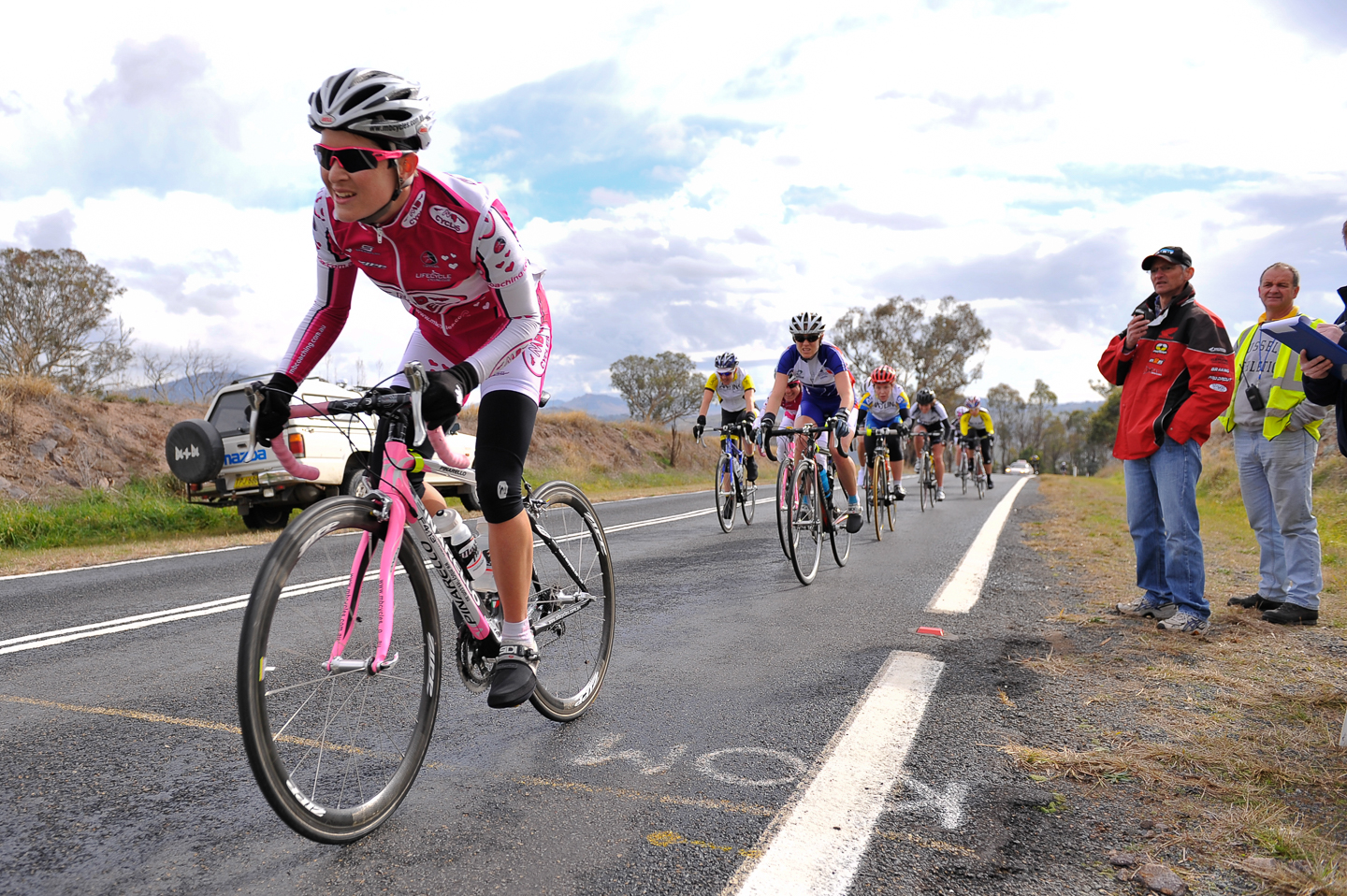

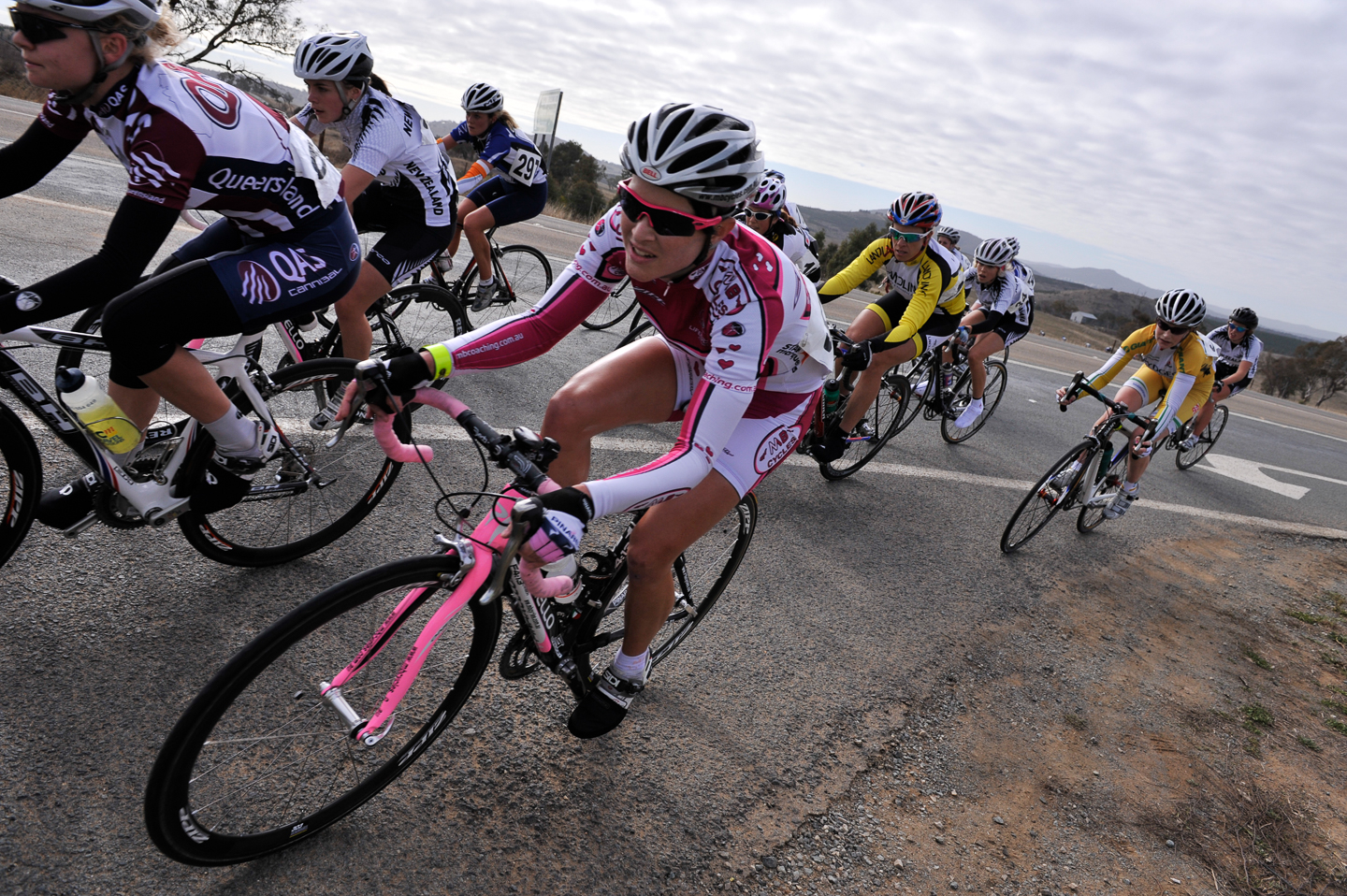
Carly Hibberd competing at the Canberra Tour July 2008

Carly Hibberd (11 May 1985 – 6 July 2011) was an Australian professional road racing cyclist who competed in Union Cycliste Internationale (UCI)-sanctioned races. She won the 2008 Australian National Criterium Championships and was second in that year's Tour de Perth. Aged six, Hibberd took up BMX before moving onto mountain biking and then road cycling.through a talent identification scheme. She began riding competitive events in 2004 and went on to compete in several women's events organised by the UCI. Hibberd was hit while riding her bike by a driver while training in Northern Italy and died from her injuries. A memorial trophy and park in Toowoomba are named after her.

== Biography ==
Hibberd was born on 11 May 1985, in the Brisbane suburb of Sherwood, Queensland. She was the daughter of Mark and Roslyn Hibberd and has one brother. Aged six, Hibberd began racing BMX in Toowoomba, often with the future professional cyclist Jared Graves, before the family moved from Toowoomba to the Sunshine Coast around 1997. She later took up mountain biking, and was subsequently introduced to road cycling by a talent identification scheme in 2000. Hibberd did so to provide herself with a greater number of opportunities for her career. She attended boarding school and then was accepted into a scholarship scheme at the Queensland Academy of Sport from 2005 to 2007. Hibberg became a member of the Ipswich Cycling Club.

In 2004, she won the Tenthill Classic road race. Hibberd began her professional career in 2005 when she entered the Geelong Tour and the New Zealand World Cup, finishing 60th and 48th overall, respectively. She finished 21st and 25th in the 2006 National Championships Australia time trial and road race. Two months later, Hibberd failed to finish her second entry in the New Zealand World Cup. She took a second-place finish in the road race and third in the criterium events of the Women's National Grand Prix Series. Not long after Hibberd came third at the Grafton to Glen Innes Cycle Classic. An illness required her to sit out several events in 2007; Hibberd came second in the 2007 Australian National Criterium Championships in the Elite category. With the MD Cycles Team she accumulated enough points in all six rounds of the 2008 Australian National Criterium Championships to win it overall with 768 points.

Hibberd received a wild card to qualify for the 2008 Geelong World Cup, where she finished 13th. She then entered the Women's Tour of New Zealand and was 62nd, before she finished second at the Tour de Perth. Hibberd signed to the Cassina Rizzardi A Style Fionucci team in 2009 and moved to Italy to further her career; she expressed a desire to qualify for the Commonwealth Games and the Olympic Games. During the season, Hibberd partook in the Grand Prix de Dottignies, the Novilon Eurocup Ronde Van Drenthe, the GP Liberazione, the Emakumeen Euskal Bira, the Giro del Trentino Alto Adige-Südtirol, the Giro d'Italia Femminile and the Giro della Toscana Int. Femminile – Memorial Michela Fanini.

In the 2010 season, she made an appearance in each of the GP Liberazione, the Gracia–Orlová, the Tour de l'Aude Cycliste Féminin, the GP Ciudad de Valladolid, the Emakumeen Saria and the Emakumeen Euskal Bira. Before the 2011 season, Hibberd moved to the Cassina Rizzardi A Style Fionucci squad. She competed in two events, the GP Liberazione and the GP Comune di Cornaredo. Hibberd was due to marry her fiancée Cameron Rogers in October 2011.

== Death ==
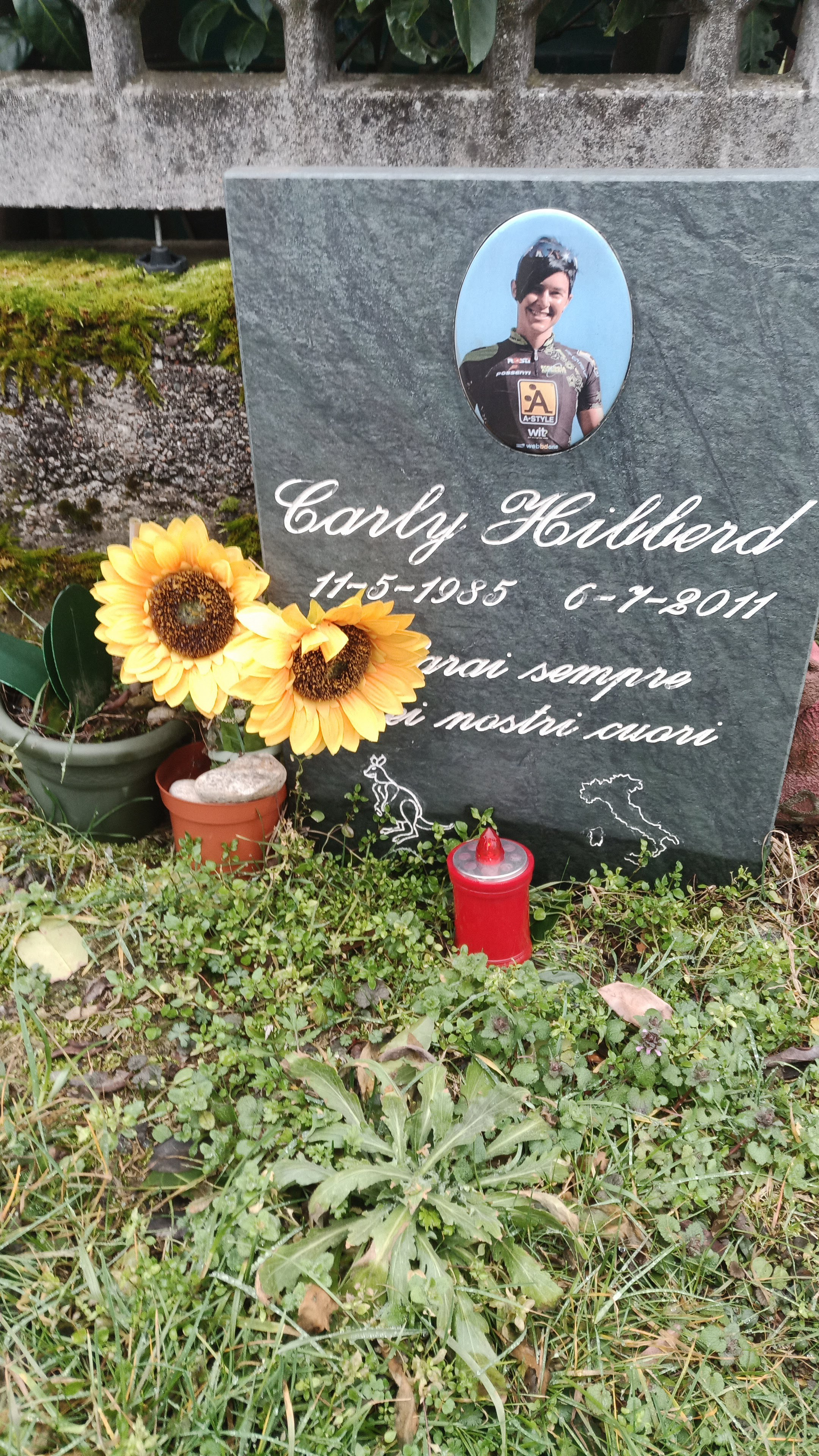
Carly Hibberd's memorial at the site of her accident

On 6 July 2011, she was with her training partner and fellow cyclist Diego Tamayo in fine weather conditions on a road between Appiano Gentile and Lurate Caccivio to the north of Milan when a friend driver struck her at around 10:45 local time. According to Tamayo, Hibberd was about 50 m (160 ft) behind when the female driver of the car steered left and hit her Hibberd. Her riding helmet had come off in the impact and she was killed instantly. Tamayo attempted resuscitation before paramedics arrived by helicopter to tend to Hibberd. On 29 July she was given a funeral at the Ashgrove Baptist Church in Brisbane attended by her family and friends.

== Legacy ==
The organisers of the 2011 Giro d'Italia Femminile cancelled the podium ceremony for its sixth stage out of respect for Hibberd. The competing Australian riders planned to wear black arm bands in Hibberd's memory and they requested a moment of silence be observed to remember her before the seventh stage began.

The Carly Hibberd Memorial Trophy was established by her first coach David Budden after Hibberd's father consented to the idea to honour "a tenacious female rider" in 2012. It is awarded after the Toowoomba BMX Club's open day by her parents who deem on the best rider who won the award on merit. On 20 January 2015, Toowoomba Regional Council voted unanimously to name a park in its "Cycling Estate" located on Nelson Street, Kearneys Spring after Hibberd following lobbying by Budden for additional memorialisation of the cyclist.
