= Australian National Criterium Championships =

National road cycling championship in Australia

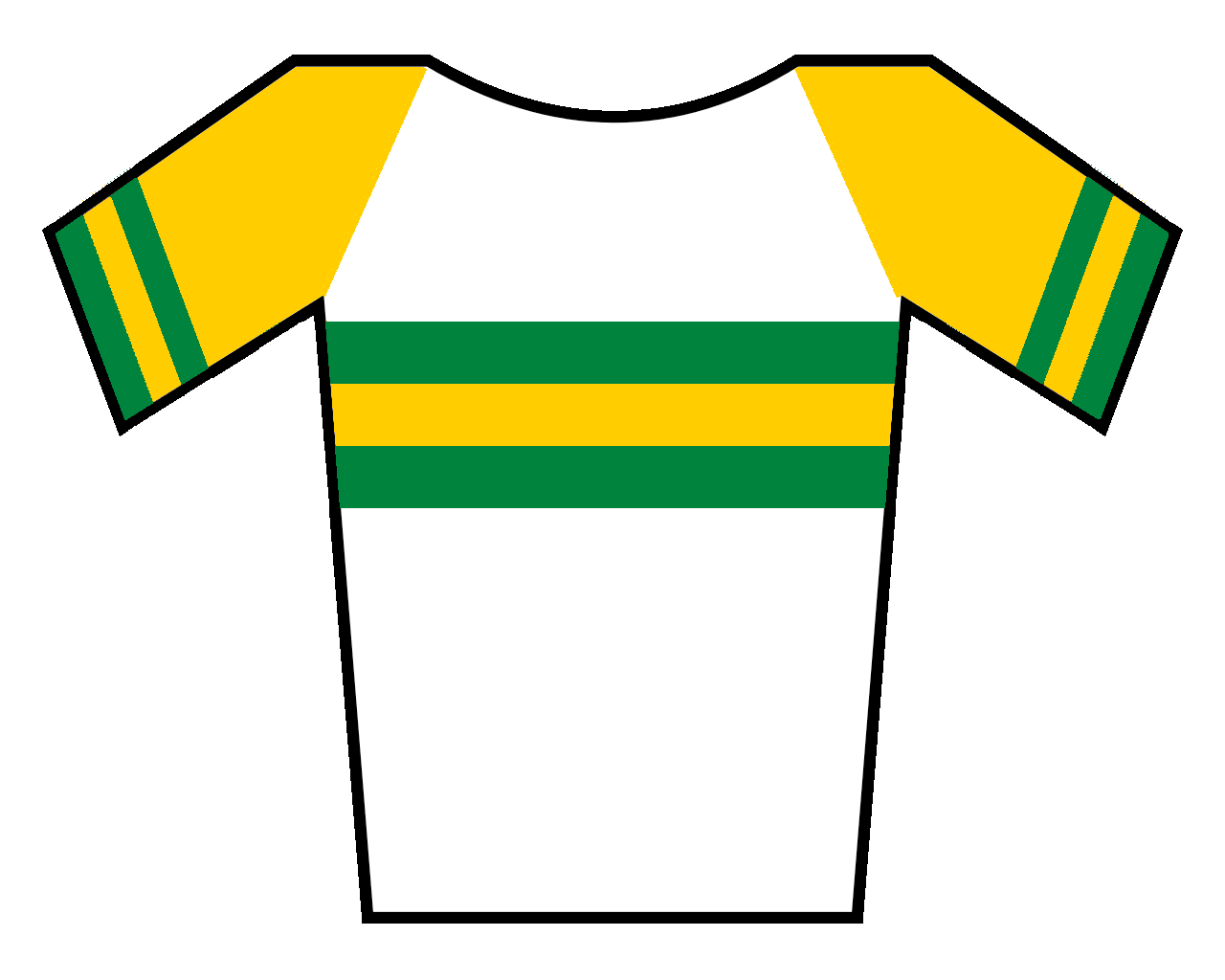
The Champion's Jersey

The Australian National Criterium Championships cover several different categories of Australian road bicycle racing events, normally held annually. The elite event is normally held in the December the preceding year, for example the 2009 championships were held on 14 December 2008, and the 2008 championships were held on 2 December 2007. Occasionally the event will be held in January and under 23 events combined with the elite race. Each year the championships are held in a different location, often incorporated in other annual criterium events.

The winners of each event are awarded with a symbolic cycling jersey featuring green and yellow stripes, which can be worn by the rider at other criterium events in the country to show their status as national champion. The champion's stripes can be combined into a sponsored rider's team kit design for this purpose.

== Elite ==
=== Men ===
Year	Gold	Silver	Bronze	Ref.
2000-1	Brett Aitken	Eddy Hollands	Stuart O'Grady	
2001-2	Robbie McEwen	Nathan O'Neill	Jans Koerts (NED)	
2002-3	Matt White	Jaaron Poad (NZ)	Craig Cahill	
2003-4	Mark Roland	Christian Lademann	David Betts	
2004-5	Allan Davis	Jaaron Poad (NZ)	Robbie McEwen	
2005-6	Ashley Hutchinson	Allan Davis	Jaaron Poad (NZ)	
2006-7	Robbie McEwen	Allan Davis	Graeme Brown	
2007-8	Baden Cooke	Christopher Sutton	Allan Davis	
2008-9	Bernard Sulzberger	Peter McDonald	Christopher Sutton	
2009-10	Aaron Kemps	Dean Windsor	Will Clarke	
2010-11	Jonathan Cantwell	Anthony Giacoppo	Stuart Shaw	
2011-12	Anthony Giacoppo	Mark Renshaw	Steele Von Hoff	
2012-13	Cameron Meyer	Steele Von Hoff	Leigh Howard	
2013-14	Steele Von Hoff	Anthony Giacoppo	Brenton Jones	
2014-15	Steele Von Hoff	Caleb Ewan	Scott Sunderland	
2015-16	Caleb Ewan	Brenton Jones	Anthony Giacoppo	
2016-17	Caleb Ewan	Scott Sunderland	Brenton Jones	
2017-18	Caleb Ewan	Steele Von Hoff	Brenton Jones	
2018-19	Brenton Jones	Tristan Ward	Jay McCarthy	
2020	Sam Welsford	Kaden Groves	Nick White	
2021	Kaden Groves	Nick White	Luke Durbridge	
2022	Cameron Ivory	Alastair Christie-Johnston	Cameron Scott	
2023	Kelland O'Brien	Blake Quick	Taj Jones	
2024	Caleb Ewan	Jensen Plowright	Sam Welsford	
2025	Sam Welsford	Cameron Scott	Blake Quick	
2026	Jensen Plowright	Sam Welsford	Kurt Eather	

=== Women ===
Year	Gold	Silver	Bronze	Ref.
1994	Kathy Watt			
1995	Anna Wilson			
1996	Kristy Scrymgeour			
1997	Sandra Smith			
1997	Bridget Evans			
1998	Lyndelle Higginson			
1999	Bridget Evans			
2000–01	Rochelle Gilmore	Sharon Wheatley	Sandra Smith	
2001–02	Rochelle Gilmore	Bridget Evans	Katie Mactier	
2002–03	Lizzie Williams	Katherine Bates	Rochelle Gilmore	
2003–04	Wendy Habermann	Diane Monk	Bridget Evans	
2004–05	Oenone Wood	Rochelle Gilmore	Emma Rickards	
2005–06	Alex Rhodes	Rochelle Gilmore	Oenone Wood	
2006–07	Alex Rhodes	Belinda Goss	Katherine Bates	
2007–08	Kirsty Broun	Carly Hibberd	Rochelle Gilmore	
2008–09	Kirsty Broun	Rochelle Gilmore	Ruth Corset	
2009–10	Carly Light	Megan Dunn	Rochelle Gilmore	
2010–11	Lauren Kitchen	Joanne Hogan	Chloe Hosking	
2011–12	Alex Rhodes	Melissa Hoskins	Annette Edmondson	
2012–13	Kimberley Wells	Loren Rowney	Gracie Elvin	
2013–14	Sarah Roy	Peta Mullens	Lauren Kitchen	
2014–15	Kimberley Wells	Peta Mullens	Lauren Kitchen	
2015–16	Sophie Mackay	Lizzie Williams	Lauren Kitchen	
2016–17	Jessica Allen	Kendelle Hodges	Shannon Malseed	
2017–18	Rebecca Wiasak	Sarah Roy	Kimberley Wells	
2018–19	Rebecca Wiasak	Sarah Roy	Ruby Roseman-Gannon	
2020	Chloe Hosking	Ruby Roseman-Gannon	Gracie Elvin	
2021	Annette Edmondson	Ruby Roseman-Gannon	Chloe Hosking	
2022	Ruby Roseman-Gannon	Josie Talbot	Peta Mullens	
2023	Amber Pate	Alexandra Manly	Matilda Field	
2024	Ruby Roseman-Gannon	Georgia Baker	Alexandra Manly	
2025	Amber Pate	Keira Will	Maeve Plouffe	
2026	Ruby Roseman-Gannon	Alexandra Manly	Josie Talbot	

== Under 23 ==
=== Men ===
Year	Gold	Silver	Bronze	Ref.
2006-7	Dean Windsor	Grant Irwin		
2007-8	Russell Gill	Hayden Josefski	Michael Hepburn	
2008-9	Chris Jory	Benjamin King	Richard Lang	
2009-10	Daniel Braunsteins	Thomas Palmer	Malcolm Rudolph	
2010-11	Ben Grenda	Richard Lang	Thomas Palmer	
2011-12	Scott Law	Jay McCarthy	Ben Grenda	
2012-13	Brad Linfield	Josh Taylor	Andrew Martin	
2013-14	Caleb Ewan	Robert-Jon McCarthy	Alex Wohler	
2014-15	Chris Hamilton	David Edwards	Jesse Kerrison	
2015-16	Jesse Kerrison	Sam Welsford	Daniel Fitter	
2016-17	Alexander Porter	Lucas Hamilton	Ayden Toovey	
2017-18	Cameron Scott	Dylan Sunderland	Sam Welsford	
2018-19	Jarrad Drizners	Kelland O'Brien	Cameron Scott	
2020	Kelland O'Brien	Conor Leahy	Matthew Rice	
2021	Matthew Rice	Bryce Lanigan	Craig Wiggins	
2022	Graeme Frislie	Josh Duffy	Zachary Marshall	
2023	Graeme Frislie	Blake Agnoletto	Declan Trezise	
2024	Blake Agnoletto	Matthew Fox	John Carter	
2025	John Carter	Leo Zimmermann	Brayden Bloch	

=== Women ===
Year	Gold	Silver	Bronze	Ref.
1996	Kristy Scrymgeour			
1998-99	Lyndelle Higginson			
2000	Rochelle Gilmore			
2001	Rochelle Gilmore			
2002	Hayley Rutherford			
2003	Katherine Bates			
2004	Alex Rhodes			
2005	Alex Rhodes			
2006	Alex Rhodes			
2007	Skye-lee Armstrong			
2008-9	Carly Hibberd			
2009-10	Chloe Hosking			
2010-11	Lauren Kitchen	Chloe Hosking	Kendelle Hodges	
2011-12	Melissa Hoskins	Annette Edmondson	Lauren Kitchen	
2012-13	Emily Roper	Jessica Mundy	Jenelle Crooks	
2013-14	Emily Roper	Rebecca Mackey	Jessica Mundy	
2014-15	Shannon Malseed	Rebecca Mackey	Tayla Evans	
2015-16	Jessica Mundy			
2016-17	Nicola MacDonald	Josie Talbot	Jessica Pratt	
2017-18	Kristina Clonan	Ruby Roseman-Gannon	Maeve Plouffe	
2018-19	Ruby Roseman-Gannon	Emily Watts	Anya Louw	
2020	Ruby Roseman-Gannon	Elizabeth Nuspan	Alexandra Martin-Wallace	
2021	Maeve Plouffe	Alexandra Martin-Wallace	Neve Bradbury	
2022	Anya Louw	Neve Bradbury	Keeley Bennett	
2023	Lucinda Stewart	Keely Bennett	Ella Sibley	
2024	Keely Bennett	Keira Will	Neve Bradbury	
2025	Keira Will	Alyssa Polites	Belinda Bailey	

== Junior / Under 19 ==
=== Men ===
Year	Gold	Silver	Bronze	Ref.
1993	Michael Stallard	Grant Curruthers	Steven Sambrooks	
1996	Brett Lancaster			
1997		Brett Lancaster		
2006	Matthew Pettit			
2007-2008	Not held			
2009	Jordan Van Der Togt	Patrick Bevin	Michael Phelan	
2010	Jackson Law	Jack Beckinsale	Jay McCarthy	
2011	Caleb Ewan	Rick Sanders	Robert-Jon McCarthy	
2012	Alexander Morgan	Caleb Ewan	Robert-Jon McCarthy	
2013	Daniel Fitter	Bradley Heffernan	Joshua Harrison	
2014	Michael Storer	Joel Yates (NZ)	Daniel Fitter	
2015	Darcy Pirotta	Kelland O'Brien	Ross Gordon	
2016	Liam Nolan			
2017	Bryce Lanigan	Jensen Plowright	Craig Wiggins	
2018	Stephen Cuff	Blake Quick	Matthew Rice	
2019	Jesse Norton	Graeme Frislie	Rohan Haydon-Smith	
2020	Declan Trezise	Blake Agnoletto	Luke Deasey	
2021	Cameron Rogers	Zac Marriage	James Panizza	
2022	Hamish McKenzie	Andrew Phillips	Leo Zimmerman	
2023	Wil Holmes	Jamie Coles	Ben Anderson	
2024	Oscar Gallagher	Luke Richert	Thomas Butler	
2025	Ollie Jirovec	Donovan Mackie	Alexander Hewes	

=== Women ===
Year	Gold	Silver	Bronze	Ref.
2006	Courtney Le Lay			
2007-2008	Not held			
2009	Melissa Hoskins	Jessica Griffiths	Megan Dunn	
2010	Sinead Noonan	Amy Cure	Jessica Allen	
2011	Letitia Custance	Kayla Salopek	Emily Roper	
2012	Georgia Baker	Taylah Jennings	Emily Roper	
2013	Alexandra Manly	Josie Talbot	Macey Stewart	
2014	Josie Talbot	Macey Stewart	Lauren Perry	
2015	Nicola Macdonald	Danielle McKinnirey	Ruby Roseman-Gannon	
2016	Chloe Moran			
2017	Jade Haines	Alexandra Martin-Wallace	Sarah Gigante	
2018	Sarah Gigante	Sophie Edwards	Emily Watts	
2019	Ashlee Jones	Elizabeth Nuspan	Francesca Sewell	
2020	Haylee Fuller	Francesca Sewell	Tahlia Dole	
2021	Lucy Stewart	Haylee Fuller	Sophie Marr	
2022	Lucy Stewart	Sophie Marr	Bronte Stewart	
2023	Mackenzie Coupland	Felicity Wilson-Haffenden	Keira Will	
2024	Nicole Duncan	Anna Dubier	Scarlett Sibbel	
2025	Amelie Sanders	Anna Dubier	Ruby Taylor	

== See also ==
- Australian National Road Race Championships
- Australian National Time Trial Championships
- National Road Cycling Championships
