= Anthony Giacoppo =

Australian cyclist (born 1986)

Personal information
- Born: 13 May 1986 (age 40)

Cycling career
- Sport: Cycling
- Current team: Retired
- Discipline: Road
- Role: Rider
- Rider type: Sprinter

Professional team
- 2011–2018: Genesys Wealth Advisers

Anthony Giacoppo (born 13 May 1986) is an Australian cyclist who raced for the same UCI Continental cycling team from 2011 to 2018.

== Major results ==
2011
2nd National Criterium Championships
2012
1st National Criterium Championships
3rd Overall Bay Classic Series

1st Stage 3

5th Overall Tour de Taiwan

1st Stages 1 & 3

1st Stage 3 Tour de Borneo
1st Prologue Tour de Kumano
2013
1st Stage 4 Jelajah Malaysia
2014
2nd National Criterium Championships
2015
5th National Criterium Championships
2016
1st Prologue & Stage 3 Tour of Japan
Tour of Tasmania

1st Points classification
1st Prologue & stage 1

2nd Paris–Chauny
3rd National Criterium Championships
3rd Grote Prijs Stad Sint-Niklaas
9th Overall Herald Sun Tour
2017
8th Overall Tour de Taiwan
2018
4th Overall Tour of China II

1st Prologue & stage 2
