= Ruby Roseman-Gannon =

Australian cyclist (born 1998)

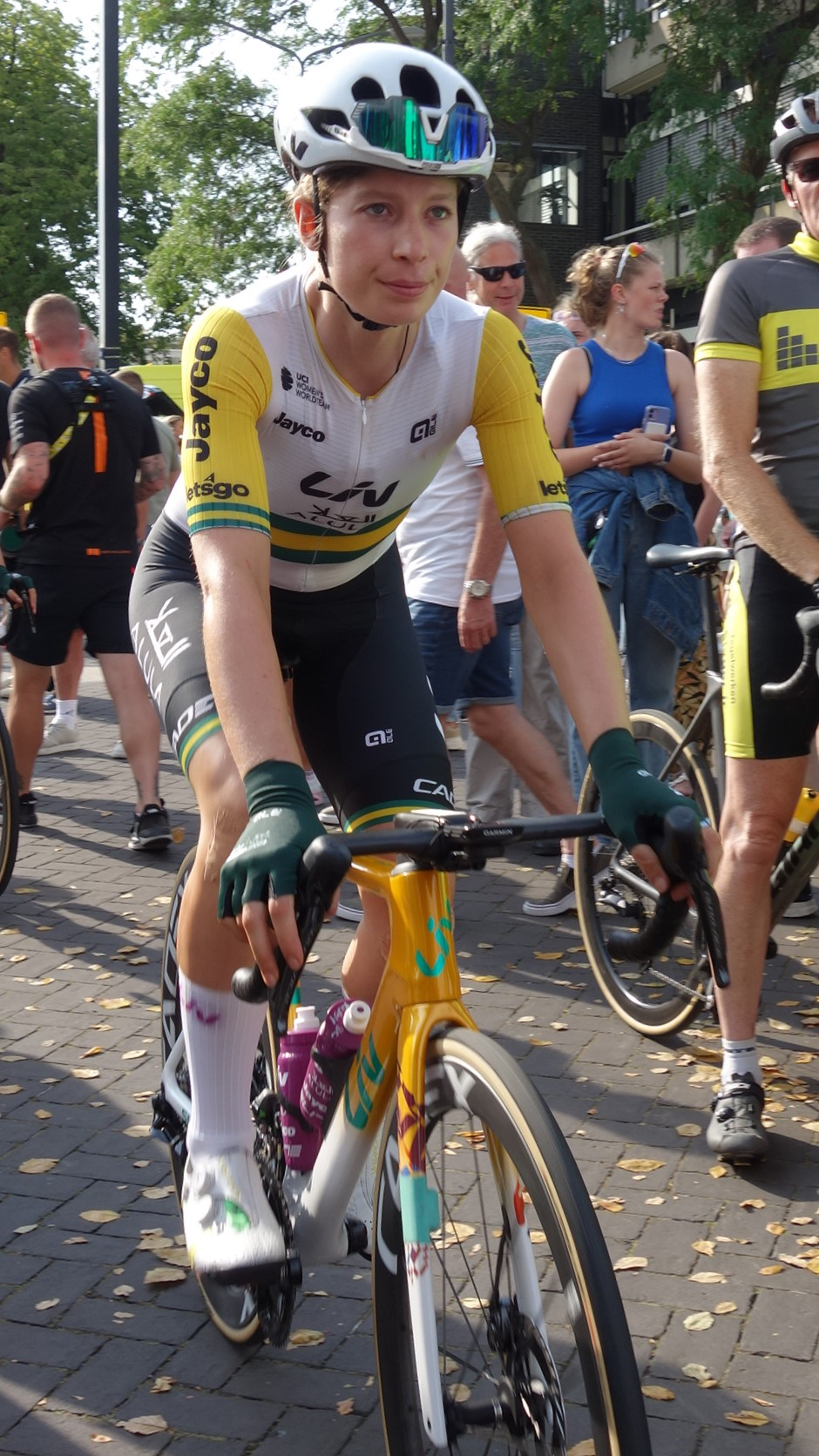
- Roseman-Gannon in 2024

Personal information
- Born: 8 November 1998 (age 27)

Cycling career
- Sport: Cycling
- Current team: Liv AlUla Jayco
- Discipline: Road
- Role: Rider

Professional team
- 2022–: Team BikeExchange–Jayco

Major wins
- One-day races and Classics National Road Race Championships (2024) National Criterium Championships (2022, 2024, 2026)
Medal record
Women's road bicycle racing
Representing Australia
World Championships
| Gold medal – first place | 2024 Zurich | Mixed team relay |

Ruby Roseman-Gannon (born 8 November 1998) is an Australian professional cyclist riding for UCI Women's WorldTeam Liv AlUla Jayco. She won the Australian National Road Championship in 2024 and the Australian National Criterium Championship in 2022, 2024 and 2026. She was the overall winner of Australia's National Road Series in 2021.

Roseman-Gannon started cycling at the age of five at the Brunswick Cycling Club. She completed a Bachelor of Science at The University of Melbourne in 2021.

== Major results ==
2015
2nd Road race, National Junior Road Championships
2016
Oceania Junior Road Championships

3rd Road race
6th Time trial

2020
6th Race Torquay
2021
1st Overall National Road Series
2022
National Road Championships

1st Criterium
4th Road race

5th Overall Simac Ladies Tour
7th Navarra Women's Elite Classics
8th Gran Premio Ciudad de Eibar
9th Emakumeen Nafarroako Women's Elite Classics
2023
National Road Championships

4th Road race
4th Time trial

4th Overall Tour Down Under
4th Overall Thüringen Ladies Tour
4th Classic Lorient Agglomération
5th Dwars door Vlaanderen
2024
UCI Road World Championships

1st Team relay
6th Road Race

National Road Championships

1st Road race
1st Criterium

9th Overall Tour of Britain

1st Stage 4

2026
National Road Championships

1st Criterium
2nd Road race

2nd Navarra Women's Elite Classic
