= 2024 Tour de France Femmes, Stage 1 to Stage 8 =

The 2024 Tour de France Femmes (officially Tour de France Femmes avec Zwift) was the third edition of the Tour de France Femmes. The race took place from 12 to 18 August and was the 22nd race in the 2024 UCI Women's World Tour calendar. The race was organised by the Amaury Sport Organisation (ASO), which also organises the men's Tour de France.

== Overview ==
Stage characteristics
Stage	Date	Course	Distance	Type
1	12 August	Rotterdam to The Hague (Netherlands)	123 km (76 mi)	Flat stage
2	13 August	Dordrecht to Rotterdam (Netherlands)	69.7 km (43.3 mi)	Flat stage
3	13 August	Rotterdam (Netherlands)	6.3 km (3.9 mi)	Individual time trial
4	14 August	Valkenburg (Netherlands) to Liège (Belgium)	122.7 km (76.2 mi)	Hilly stage
5	15 August	Bastogne (Belgium) to Amnéville	152.5 km (94.8 mi)	Flat stage
6	16 August	Remiremont to Morteau	159.2 km (98.9 mi)	Hilly stage
7	17 August	Champagnole to Le Grand-Bornand	166.4 km (103.4 mi)	Mountain stage
8	18 August	Le Grand-Bornand to Alpe d'Huez	149.9 km (93.1 mi)	Mountain stage
Total			949.7 km (590.1 mi)	

== Classification standings ==
Legend
Denotes the leader of the General classification	Denotes the leader of the Mountains classification
Denotes the leader of the Points classification	Denotes the leader of the Young rider classification
Denotes the leader of the Team classification	Denotes the winner of the Combativity award

== Stage 1 ==
12 August 2024 – Rotterdam to The Hague (Netherlands), 123 km (76 mi)

The first stage of the race took riders on a 123 km (76 mi) flat course from Rotterdam to The Hague, with a fourth category climb of the Maasdeltatunnel (1km with an average gradient of 3.1%) located 61 kilometres (38 mi) before the finish.

In the early part of the stage, numerous riders attempted to escape in breakaways to no avail. With 79 kilometres (49 mi) remaining, Cristina Tonetti (Laboral Kutxa–Fundación Euskadi) attacked from the peloton. Tonetti's lead grew following a crash in the peloton, with seven riders down. Tonetti therefore took the Queen of the Mountains (QoM) points available at the Massdeltatunnel, before she was caught shortly after by the peloton. The pack stayed together for the rest of the stage, with Marianne Vos (Visma–Lease a Bike) taking the intermediate sprint.

In the sprint finish, the expected favourite for the stage win Lorena Wiebes (Team SD Worx–Protime) suffered a mechanical issue with her derailleur, meaning that she was unable to sprint for the line. Instead, Charlotte Kool (Team dsm–firmenich PostNL) won the stage a bike length ahead of her rivals, taking the maillot jaune (yellow jersey) of the general classification (GC), as well as the points classification. Second place on the stage was Anniina Ahtosalo (Uno-X Mobility) who took the lead in the young rider classification. Tonetti took the lead in the mountains classification, following her solo attack earlier in the stage.

Five riders abandoned the race during the stage – four of them from the Tashkent City Women Professional Cycling Team, after they were unable to keep with the pace of the peloton on the flat stage. The team was criticised for its poor performance, with only one rider crossing the finish line in the main group.

Stage 1 Result
Rank	Rider	Team	Time
1	Charlotte Kool (NED)	Team dsm–firmenich PostNL	2h 47' 40"
2	Anniina Ahtosalo (FIN)	Uno-X Mobility	+ 0"
3	Elisa Balsamo (ITA)	Lidl–Trek	+ 0"
4	Lotta Henttala (FIN)	EF–Oatly–Cannondale	+ 0"
5	Marianne Vos (NED)	Visma–Lease a Bike	+ 0"
6	Daria Pikulik (POL)	Human Powered Health	+ 0"
7	Mylène de Zoete (NED)	Ceratizit–WNT Pro Cycling	+ 0"
8	Kimberley Le Court (MRI)	AG Insurance–Soudal	+ 0"
9	Emilia Fahlin (SWE)	Arkéa–B&B Hotels Women	+ 0"
10	Blanka Vas (HUN)	Team SD Worx–Protime	+ 0"

General classification after Stage 1
Rank	Rider	Team	Time
1	Charlotte Kool (NED)	Team dsm–firmenich PostNL	2h 47' 30"
2	Anniina Ahtosalo (FIN)	Uno-X Mobility	+ 4"
3	Elisa Balsamo (ITA)	Lidl–Trek	+ 6"
4	Lotta Henttala (FIN)	EF–Oatly–Cannondale	+ 10"
5	Marianne Vos (NED)	Visma–Lease a Bike	+ 10"
6	Daria Pikulik (POL)	Human Powered Health	+ 10"
7	Mylène de Zoete (NED)	Ceratizit–WNT Pro Cycling	+ 10"
8	Kimberley Le Court (MRI)	AG Insurance–Soudal	+ 10"
9	Emilia Fahlin (SWE)	Arkéa–B&B Hotels Women	+ 10"
10	Blanka Vas (HUN)	Team SD Worx–Protime	+ 10"

== Stage 2 ==
13 August 2024 – Dordrecht to Rotterdam (Netherlands), 69.7 km (43.3 mi)

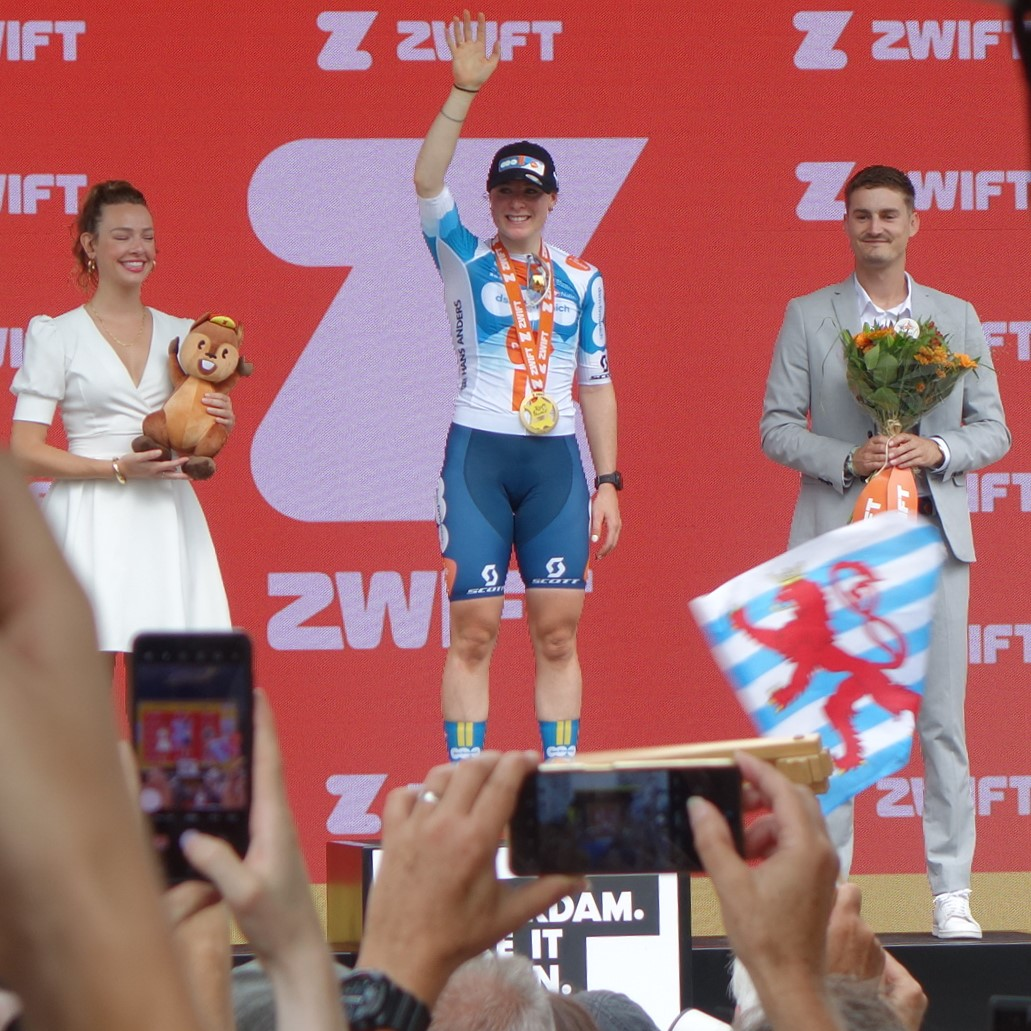
Charlotte Kool (Team dsm–firmenich PostNL) celebrating her stage victory

The second stage took the riders from Dordrecht to Rotterdam, over a short, flat 69.7 km (43.3 mi) course. The stage took place in the morning, with stage 3 (an individual time trial) taking place in the afternoon.

The short stage led to nervous racing, with numerous splits in the peloton early on in the stage. With 40 kilometres (25 mi) remaining, Audrey De Keersmaeker (Lotto–Dstny Ladies) attacked in a solo breakaway. She was caught with 9.8 kilometres (6.1 mi) to go in the stage, with teams preparing for a sprint finish.

In the final sprint, Team SD Worx–Protime worked to position Wiebes perfectly, launching her sprint with 200 metres to go. However Kool was faster than Wiebes and took the stage in a photo finish, her second stage win in the Tour. The bonus seconds available at the finish extended Kool's lead in the GC to 14 seconds, with Kool also remaining in the lead of the points classification. Ahtosalo maintained her lead in the young rider classification, and the lack of climbs on the stage meant that Tonetti stayed in the polka-dot jersey.

Stage 2 Result
Rank	Rider	Team	Time
1	Charlotte Kool (NED)	Team dsm–firmenich PostNL	1h 32' 49"
2	Lorena Wiebes (NED)	Team SD Worx–Protime	+ 0"
3	Marianne Vos (NED)	Visma–Lease a Bike	+ 0"
4	Lotta Henttala (FIN)	EF–Oatly–Cannondale	+ 0"
5	Elisa Balsamo (ITA)	Lidl–Trek	+ 0"
6	Rachele Barbieri (ITA)	Team dsm–firmenich PostNL	+ 0"
7	Mylène de Zoete (NED)	Ceratizit–WNT Pro Cycling	+ 0"
8	Maggie Coles-Lyster (CAN)	Roland	+ 0"
9	Martina Alzini (ITA)	Cofidis	+ 0"
10	Puck Pieterse (NED)	Fenix–Deceuninck	+ 0"

General classification after Stage 2
Rank	Rider	Team	Time
1	Charlotte Kool (NED)	Team dsm–firmenich PostNL	4h 20' 09"
2	Anniina Ahtosalo (FIN)	Uno-X Mobility	+ 14"
3	Lorena Wiebes (NED)	Team SD Worx–Protime	+ 14"
4	Marianne Vos (NED)	Visma–Lease a Bike	+ 16"
5	Elisa Balsamo (ITA)	Lidl–Trek	+ 16"
6	Lotta Henttala (FIN)	EF–Oatly–Cannondale	+ 20"
7	Mylène de Zoete (NED)	Ceratizit–WNT Pro Cycling	+ 20"
8	Emilia Fahlin (SWE)	Arkéa–B&B Hotels Women	+ 20"
9	Kathrin Schweinberger (AUT)	Ceratizit–WNT Pro Cycling	+ 20"
10	Kimberley Le Court (MRI)	AG Insurance–Soudal	+ 20"

== Stage 3 ==
13 August 2024 – Rotterdam (Netherlands), 6.3 km (3.9 mi)

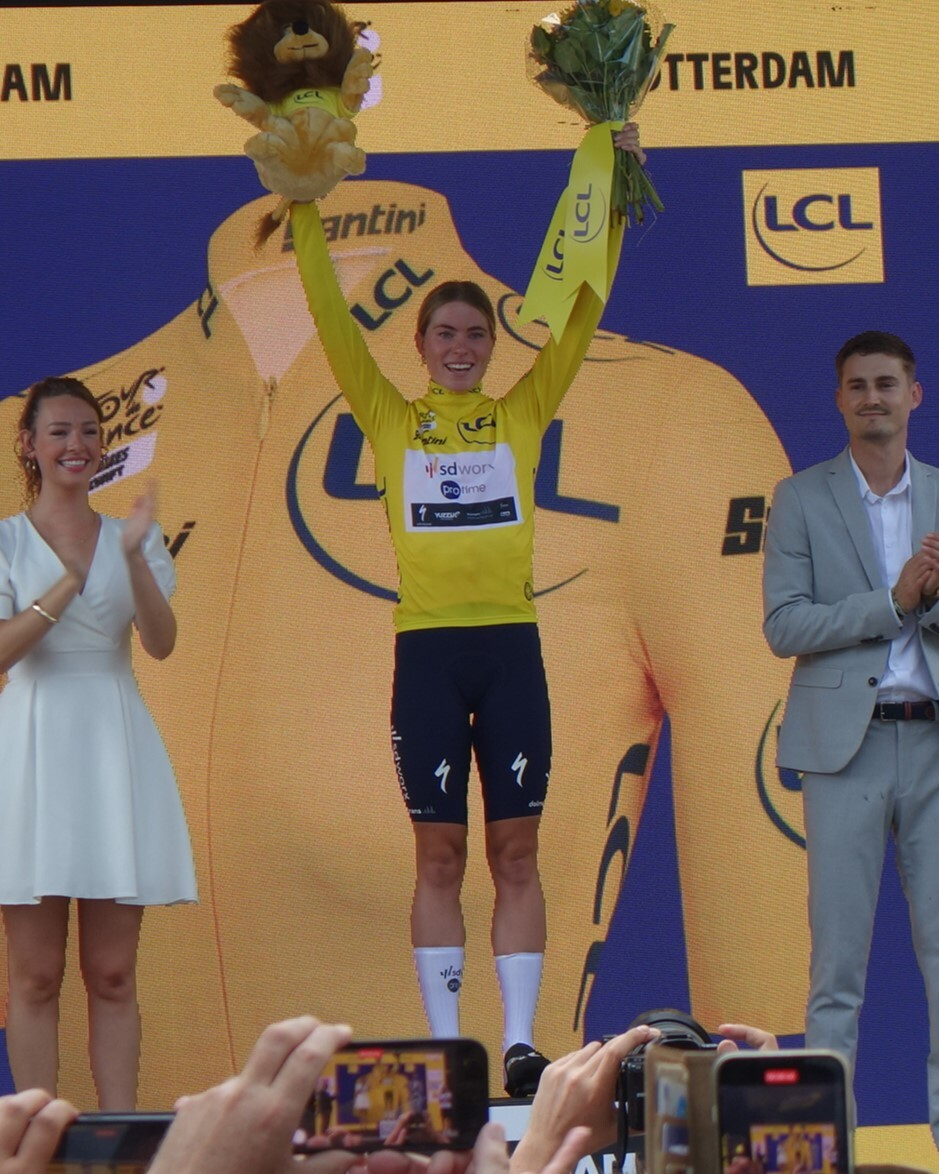
Demi Vollering (Team SD Worx–Protime) in the yellow jersey following her stage win

The third stage of the race was an individual time trial over a short 6.3 km (3.9 mi) course in the centre of Rotterdam. The flat course only had nine major corners, with two slight rises over the Erasmusbrug and Willemsbrug bridges.

Maëva Squiban (Arkéa–B&B Hotels Women) was the first rider to set a time under eight minutes, with Elena Pirrone (Roland) then setting a time 6 seconds faster that was not beaten for 25 minutes. Loes Adegeest (FDJ–Suez) set a fast time of 7 min 30 s, with Dutch favourite Ellen van Dijk (Lidl–Trek) and double Olympic champion Kristen Faulkner (EF–Oatly–Cannondale) both setting times a second slower. Olympic time trial champion Grace Brown (FDJ–Suez) suffered a puncture, losing around 30 seconds as the short course allowed no time to catch up.

Chloé Dygert (Canyon//SRAM) was the first rider quicker than Adegeest, setting a time just 0.17 seconds faster. Defending champion Demi Vollering (Team SD Worx–Protime) then set the fastest time, around five seconds quicker than Dygert. Wearing the yellow jersey, Kool was last to attempt the course. However, she was unable to keep up with the top contenders, setting a time of 7 min 50 s – falling to 33rd overall. She retained her lead in the points classification.

Vollering therefore took the lead in GC, just three seconds ahead of Wiebes and five ahead of Dygert. Ahtosalo maintained her lead in the young riders classification. Vollering was delighted with her stage win, tearily stating that she "really didn't see this coming".

Stage 3 Result
Rank	Rider	Team	Time
1	Demi Vollering (NED)	Team SD Worx–Protime	7' 25"
2	Chloé Dygert (USA)	Canyon//SRAM	+ 5"
3	Loes Adegeest (NED)	FDJ–Suez	+ 5"
4	Cédrine Kerbaol (FRA)	Ceratizit–WNT Pro Cycling	+ 5"
5	Kristen Faulkner (USA)	EF–Oatly–Cannondale	+ 6"
6	Ellen van Dijk (NED)	Lidl–Trek	+ 6"
7	Lorena Wiebes (NED)	Team SD Worx–Protime	+ 9"
8	Mischa Bredewold (NED)	Team SD Worx–Protime	+ 9"
9	Emma Norsgaard (DEN)	Movistar Team	+ 10"
10	Anna Henderson (GBR)	Visma–Lease a Bike	+ 11"

General classification after Stage 3
Rank	Rider	Team	Time
1	Demi Vollering (NED)	Team SD Worx–Protime	4h 27' 54"
2	Lorena Wiebes (NED)	Team SD Worx–Protime	+ 3"
3	Chloé Dygert (USA)	Canyon//SRAM	+ 5"
4	Loes Adegeest (NED)	FDJ–Suez	+ 5"
5	Charlotte Kool (NED)	Team dsm–firmenich PostNL	+ 5"
6	Cédrine Kerbaol (FRA)	Ceratizit–WNT Pro Cycling	+ 5"
7	Kristen Faulkner (USA)	EF–Oatly–Cannondale	+ 6"
8	Ellen van Dijk (NED)	Lidl–Trek	+ 6"
9	Mischa Bredewold (NED)	Team SD Worx–Protime	+ 9"
10	Emma Norsgaard (DEN)	Movistar Team	+ 10"

== Stage 4 ==
14 August 2024 – Valkenburg (Netherlands) to Liège (Belgium), 122.7 km (76.2 mi)

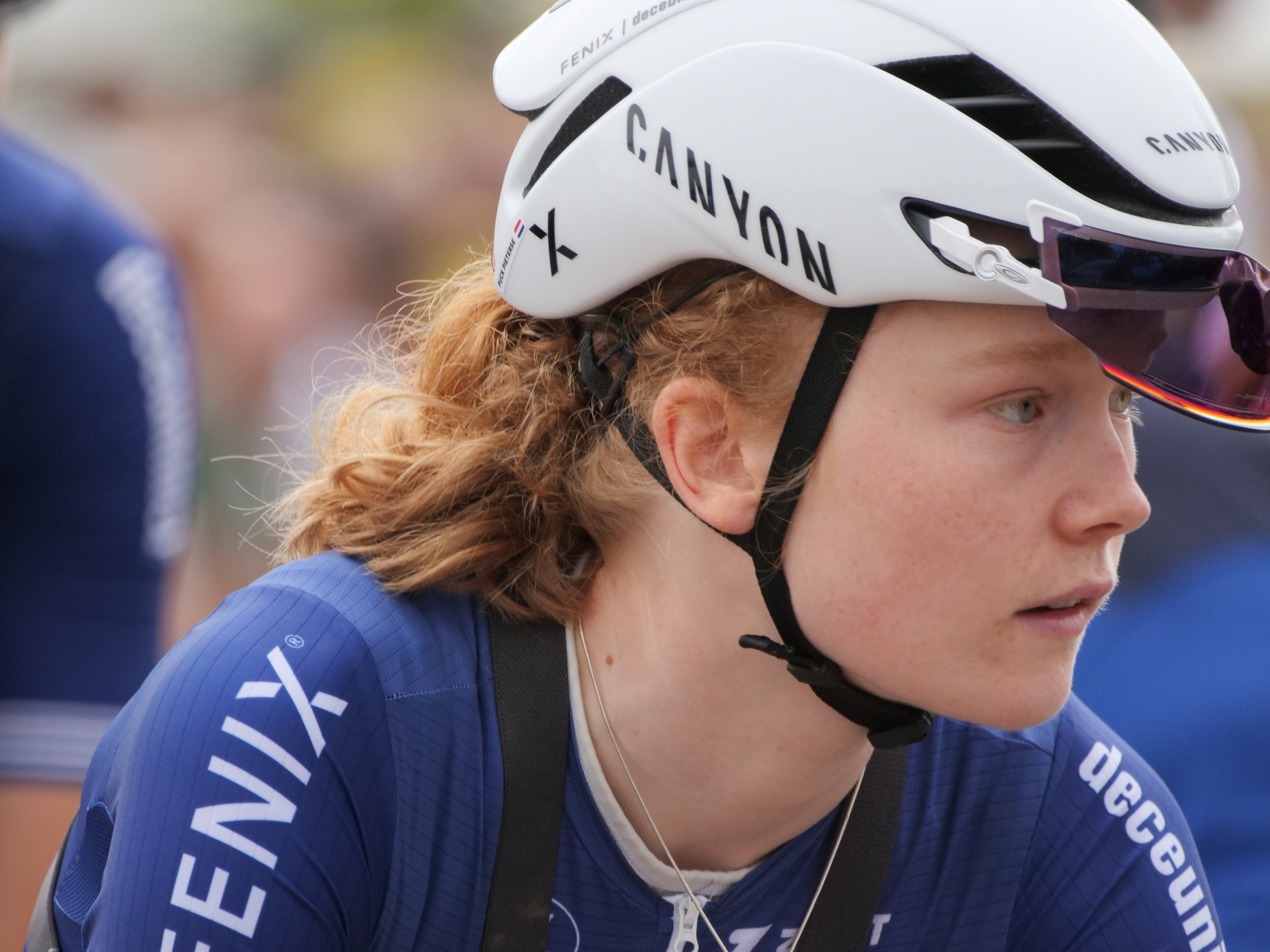
Winner of stage 4, Puck Pieterse (Fenix–Deceuninck) awaiting the start of the stage in Valkenburg

The fourth stage took the riders south from Valkenburg to Liège, over a hilly 122.7 km (76.2 mi) course with eight categorised climbs. The route used climbs such as the Cauberg and Côte de La Redoute, which feature in the Ardennes classics races of Liège–Bastogne–Liège Femmes and the Amstel Gold Race. The stage was held in wet weather.

Passing over the initial climbs in the Netherlands, the peloton stayed together. With 90 kilometres (56 mi) to go, Sara Martín (Movistar Team) went on a solo breakaway, gaining over a minute ahead of the peloton. Kool won the sprint in the peloton behind for the intermediate sprint, increasing her lead in the points classification. A closed level crossing delayed both Martín and the peloton, with a gap given to Martín when racing resumed – however she was swallowed up by the peloton on the third category climb of Mont Theux.

On the second category climb of Côte de La Redoute (1.6km with an average gradient of 9%), Puck Pieterse (Fenix–Deceuninck) began to pull away from the peloton, being chased back by GC contenders Vollering and Katarzyna Niewiadoma (Canyon//SRAM) and the peloton. The second to last climb was Côte des Forges (1.3km with an average gradient of 7.8%), with Justine Ghekiere (AG Insurance–Soudal) attacked, gaining a 20-second lead on the descent. Cecilie Uttrup Ludwig (FDJ–Suez) crashed on the wet roads of the descent.

On the final categorised climb of the day – Côte de la Roche-aux-Faucons (1.3km with an average gradient of 11%) – Team SD Worx–Protime led the peloton's chase of Ghekiere, catching her 300 metres from the top. Vollering, Niewiadoma, Pieterse and Pauliena Rooijakkers (Fenix–Deceuninck) pulled away from the peloton, with Pieterse taking the QoM points at the top.

Descending towards Liège, the trio of Vollering, Niewiadoma and Pieterse pulled away from Rooijakkers – with Vollering taking bonus seconds on a minor climb located around 11 kilometres (6.8 mi) to go. With 1 kilometre (0.62 mi) to go, the three riders had a 30-second lead over the peloton. At the finish, Pieterse outsprinted Vollering to take her first stage win of the Tour in a photo finish.

Vollering retained her yellow jersey of the GC, extending her lead to 22 seconds. Pieterse took second place, the lead of the young rider classification as well as the polka-dot jersey of the mountains classification. Niewiadoma took third place, 34 seconds on GC behind Vollering. Kool retained her green jersey of the points classification.

Stage 4 Result
Rank	Rider	Team	Time
1	Puck Pieterse (NED)	Fenix–Deceuninck	3h 12' 28"
2	Demi Vollering (NED)	Team SD Worx–Protime	+ 0"
3	Katarzyna Niewiadoma (POL)	Canyon//SRAM	+ 0"
4	Kimberley Le Court (MRI)	AG Insurance–Soudal	+ 29"
5	Noemi Rüegg (SUI)	EF–Oatly–Cannondale	+ 29"
6	Thalita De Jong (NED)	Lotto–Dstny Ladies	+ 29"
7	Evita Muzic (FRA)	FDJ–Suez	+ 29"
8	Shirin van Anrooij (NED)	Lidl–Trek	+ 29"
9	Niamh Fisher-Black (NZL)	Team SD Worx–Protime	+ 29"
10	Mareille Meijering (NED)	Movistar Team	+ 29"

General classification after Stage 4
Rank	Rider	Team	Time
1	Demi Vollering (NED)	Team SD Worx–Protime	7h 40' 10"
2	Puck Pieterse (NED)	Fenix–Deceuninck	+ 22"
3	Katarzyna Niewiadoma (POL)	Canyon//SRAM	+ 34"
4	Kristen Faulkner (USA)	EF–Oatly–Cannondale	+ 47"
5	Juliette Labous (FRA)	Team dsm–firmenich PostNL	+ 56"
6	Pauliena Rooijakkers (NED)	Fenix–Deceuninck	+ 1' 03"
7	Kimberley Le Court (MRI)	AG Insurance–Soudal	+ 1' 03"
8	Thalita De Jong (NED)	Lotto–Dstny Ladies	+ 1' 04"
9	Cédrine Kerbaol (FRA)	Ceratizit–WNT Pro Cycling	+ 1' 04"
10	Shirin van Anrooij (NED)	Lidl–Trek	+ 1' 07"

== Stage 5 ==
15 August 2024 – Bastogne (Belgium) to Amnéville, 152.5 km (94.8 mi)

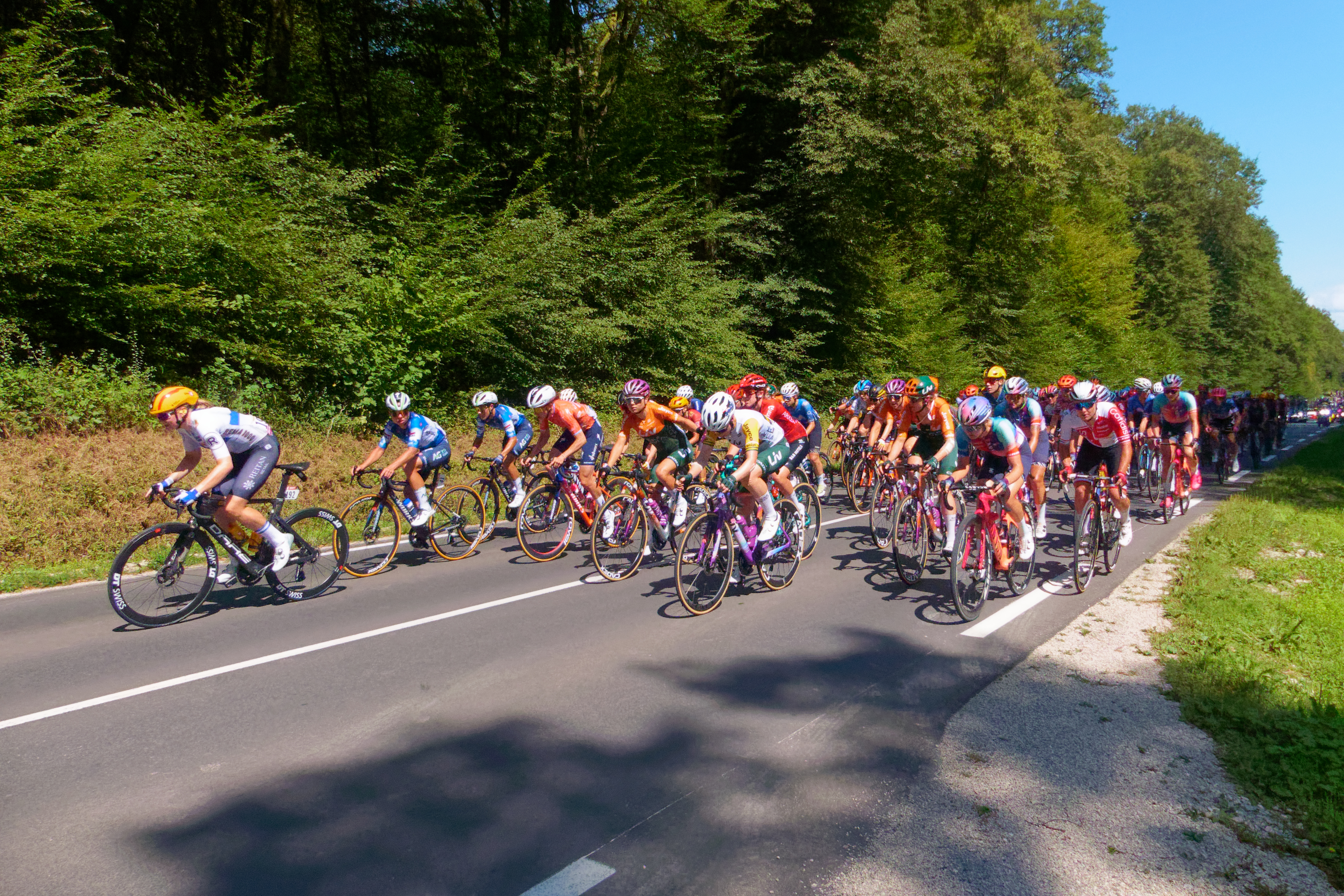
The peloton passing through Froideterre

The fifth stage took the riders south from Bastogne to Amnéville, over a flat 152.5 km (94.8 mi) course with five categorised climbs.

No breakaways got away from the peloton in the early stages of the race, with Adegeest escaping with 80 kilometres (50 mi) to go, later joined by Julie Van de Velde (AG Insurance–Soudal) and Fem van Empel (Visma–Lease a Bike). With 40 kilometres (25 mi) of the stage remaining, the three riders had a 2 min 45 s lead over the peloton. By the top of the Côte de Briey, the gap had fallen to 1 min 30 s, after Team SD Worx–Protime, Lidl–Trek and Movistar Team increased the pace of the peloton. On the final climb of the day, Pieterse pushed hard to close the gap to the trio – extending her lead in the QoM classification by crossing the summit ahead of others in the peloton.

With 10 kilometres (6.2 mi) to go, the gap was at 23 seconds but then fell rapidly. However, with 6 kilometres (3.7 mi) remaining a sharp corner out of a roundabout located caught the peloton by surprise, with around 25 riders crashing at high speed. Riders who lost time included the yellow jersey of Vollering, 2nd placed Pieterse and young rider contenders Shirin van Anrooij (Lidl–Trek) and Neve Bradbury (Canyon//SRAM). Vollering took some time to remount her bike, and was visibly in pain as she rode towards the finish. Two riders abandoned the race following their injuries sustained in the crash, with Pfeiffer Georgi (Team dsm–firmenich PostNL) suffering a fractured neck and broken hand.

A small group of remaining riders including Niewiadoma, Faulkner, Blanka Vas (Team SD Worx–Protime), Liane Lippert (Movistar Team), and Cédrine Kerbaol (Ceratizit–WNT Pro Cycling) caught the breakaway with 2.4 kilometres (1.5 mi) to go. In the final kilometre, the group fought amongst themselves, with Niewiadoma and Faulkner both attempting attacks. Finally, Lippert went in the final steep section, however Vas was strong enough to overtake her and take her first stage win in the Tour.

Niewiadoma took the GC lead, with a 19-second lead ahead of Faulkner and 22 seconds ahead of Pieterse. She expressed her delight in taking the yellow jersey, stating that "It feels very special". Despite her crash, Pieterse retained her lead in the QoM and young rider classifications. Vollering had crossed the line 1 min 47 s behind Vas, and fell to 9th place overall, 1 min 19 s behind Niewiadoma. Vollering noted that she was glad not to "suffer any broken bones" given the speed of the crash. There was criticism of Team SD Worx–Protime for not sending riders to support Vollering to the finish line, with Vas noting that her radio was not working.

Stage 5 Result
Rank	Rider	Team	Time
1	Blanka Vas (HUN)	Team SD Worx–Protime	3h 46' 51"
2	Katarzyna Niewiadoma (POL)	Canyon//SRAM	+ 0"
3	Liane Lippert (GER)	Movistar Team	+ 0"
4	Kristen Faulkner (USA)	EF–Oatly–Cannondale	+ 0"
5	Emma Norsgaard (DEN)	Movistar Team	+ 8"
6	Lucinda Brand (NED)	Lidl–Trek	+ 11"
7	Cédrine Kerbaol (FRA)	Ceratizit–WNT Pro Cycling	+ 11"
8	Lorena Wiebes (NED)	Team SD Worx–Protime	+ 28"
9	Marianne Vos (NED)	Visma–Lease a Bike	+ 28"
10	Évita Muzic (FRA)	FDJ–Suez	+ 28"

General classification after Stage 5
Rank	Rider	Team	Time
1	Katarzyna Niewiadoma (POL)	Canyon//SRAM	11h 27' 29"
2	Kristen Faulkner (USA)	EF–Oatly–Cannondale	+ 19"
3	Puck Pieterse (NED)	Fenix–Deceuninck	+ 22"
4	Cédrine Kerbaol (FRA)	Ceratizit–WNT Pro Cycling	+ 47"
5	Juliette Labous (FRA)	Team dsm–firmenich PostNL	+ 56"
6	Thalita De Jong (NED)	Lotto–Dstny Ladies	+ 1' 04"
7	Shirin van Anrooij (NED)	Lidl–Trek	+ 1' 07"
8	Pauliena Rooijakkers (NED)	Fenix–Deceuninck	+ 1' 08"
9	Demi Vollering (NED)	Team SD Worx–Protime	+ 1' 19"
10	Liane Lippert (GER)	Movistar Team	+ 1' 20"

== Stage 6 ==
16 August 2024 – Remiremont to Morteau, 159.2 km (98.9 mi)

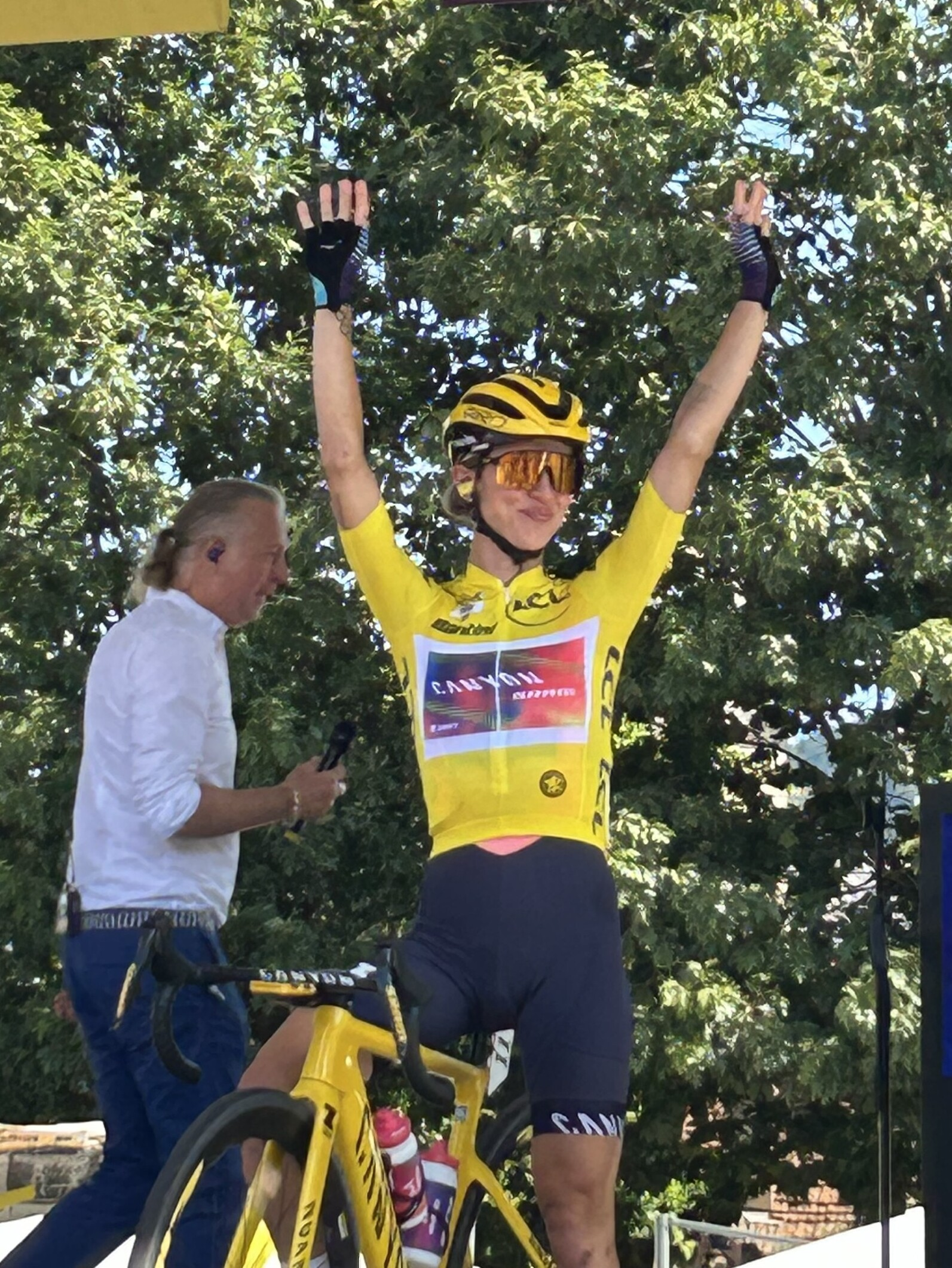
Katarzyna Niewiadoma (Canyon//SRAM) in the yellow jersey at the stage start in Remiremont

The sixth stage of the race took the riders further south from Remiremont to Morteau, on a hilly 159.2 km (98.9 mi) course with five categorised climbs, including the second category climb of La Roche du Prêtre (5.5km with an average gradient of 5.6%).

A group of 10 riders broke away from the peloton early on in the stage, with Ghekiere taking the QoM points at the top of Col du Mont du Fourche. This break was caught with 134 kilometres (83 mi) remaining, but attacks soon followed to establish another break.

A second breakaway was established with 108 kilometres (67 mi) to go, with 13 riders, again including Ghekiere. 4 more riders (including Niamh Fisher-Black (Team SD Worx–Protime) and Vos) joined them 20 kilometres (12 mi) later – with the break establishing a 2-minute lead over the peloton. Ghekiere took the maximum QoM points at both the Col de Ferrière and the Côte de Laviron, moving into the lead of the mountains classification. Vos won the intermediate sprint in Sancey, reducing the margin between her and Kool.

The peloton began to thin out and break on the La Roche du Prêtre climb, reducing to just six riders. At the summit, Fisher-Black took the maximum QoM points. Multiple attacks followed, as the peloton reduced the gap to around 30 seconds. On the final climb of Côte de Fins, the peloton caught the break, with Pieterse taking the QoM points.

On the descent of the final climb, Kerbaol and Rooijakkers attacked, quickly gaining 10 seconds. With 5 kilometres (3.1 mi) remaining, Kerbaol had gained a 30-second lead following a high-speed descent, with Rooijakkers swallowed by the peloton. A final steep climb remained in the final 2 kilometres (1.2 mi), however Kerbaol pushed towards the finish line to take France's first ever stage win at the Tour. Behind Kerbaol, Vos won the group sprint for second place, thereby taking the lead in the points classification from Kool.

Speaking to media after the finish, Kerbaol stated that she took "full advantage of the descent" and hoped that the French were happy with her victory. She moved up to 2nd place overall, 16 seconds behind Niewiadoma. 16 riders remained within two minutes of the overall lead, with 9 different teams in the top 10. Vollering did not lose any additional time to Niewiadoma, but fell to 10th place overall. Ghekiere took the polka-dot jersey of the QoM classification, with Pieterse maintaining her lead in the young rider classification.

Stage 6 Result
Rank	Rider	Team	Time
1	Cédrine Kerbaol (FRA)	Ceratizit–WNT Pro Cycling	4h 04' 41"
2	Marianne Vos (NED)	Visma–Lease a Bike	+ 21"
3	Liane Lippert (GER)	Movistar Team	+ 21"
4	Karlijn Swinkels (NED)	UAE Team ADQ	+ 21"
5	Lucinda Brand (NED)	Lidl–Trek	+ 21"
6	Katarzyna Niewiadoma (POL)	Canyon//SRAM	+ 21"
7	Puck Pieterse (NED)	Fenix–Deceuninck	+ 21"
8	Thalita De Jong (NED)	Lotto–Dstny Ladies	+ 21"
9	Évita Muzic (FRA)	FDJ–Suez	+ 21"
10	Juliette Labous (FRA)	Team dsm–firmenich PostNL	+ 21"

General classification after Stage 6
Rank	Rider	Team	Time
1	Katarzyna Niewiadoma (POL)	Canyon//SRAM	15h 32' 31"
2	Cédrine Kerbaol (FRA)	Ceratizit–WNT Pro Cycling	+ 16"
3	Kristen Faulkner (USA)	EF–Oatly–Cannondale	+ 19"
4	Puck Pieterse (NED)	Fenix–Deceuninck	+ 22"
5	Juliette Labous (FRA)	Team dsm–firmenich PostNL	+ 56"
6	Thalita De Jong (NED)	Lotto–Dstny Ladies	+ 1' 04"
7	Shirin van Anrooij (NED)	Lidl–Trek	+ 1' 07"
8	Pauliena Rooijakkers (NED)	Fenix–Deceuninck	+ 1' 08"
9	Liane Lippert (GER)	Movistar Team	+ 1' 16"
10	Demi Vollering (NED)	Team SD Worx–Protime	+ 1' 19"

== Stage 7 ==
17 August 2024 – Champagnole to Le Grand-Bornand, 166.4 km (103.4 mi)

The seventh stage took the riders into the French Alps, with the longest stage of the Tour from Champagnole to Le Grand-Bornand, 166.4 km (103.4 mi) in length. The mountainous stage had five categorised climbs, including the first category climb of Col de la Croix de la Serra (12km with an average gradient of 5.1%). Montee du Chinaillon was the final climb to the finish at Le Grand-Bornand, a second category climb at 7km in length with an average gradient of 5.1%.

Early on in the stage, Kool – winner of stages one and two – abandoned the race. The first 50 kilometres (31 mi) featured numerous attempts for a breakaway, however the peloton tackled the Col de la Croix de la Serra together. Pieterse claimed the QoM points, beating Ghekiere; her rival for the polka-dot jersey.

Six riders then escaped – including Vos and Ghekiere. Ghekiere subsequently took maximum QoM points on the Côte de Bois d'Arlod and Côte de Cercier, extending her lead in the mountains classification. Vos then won the intermediate sprint in Frangy, extending her points classification lead further. The lead of the breakaway grew to around 5 minutes, approaching the last two climbs of the stage.

On the Col de St Jean de Sixt, the peloton began to shrink the advantage of the breakaway, with slower riders falling out of the back of the group unable to keep the pace. Ghekiere attacked from the breakaway, attempting to solo towards the finish and gain further QoM points. At the top of the climb, Ghekiere had a lead of 2 min 30 s followed by a group of around twenty riders including GC favourites such as Niewiadoma and Vollering.

Beginning the final ascent to Le Grand-Bornand, Squiban attacked from the small group of favourites, with no rider following her. Despite attempts, the gap to Ghekiere did not fall substantially throughout the climb. Squiban also managed to maintain her advantage of a shrinking field of GC contenders. Reaching the top of the climb, Ghekiere won the stage by 1 min 15 s ahead of Squiban. In the last kilometre, Niewiadoma tested the remaining GC contenders with a powerful acceleration, with only Vollering able to follow. At the finish line, Vollering overtook Niewiadoma to take 3rd on the stage, gaining four bonus seconds for her efforts and moving into 8th overall.

Niewiadoma maintained her yellow jersey, extending her lead over Pieterse to 27 seconds. Kerbaol fell to third place overall, 10 seconds further back. As well as her stage win, Ghekiere's efforts meant that she also extended her lead in the mountains classification. Pieterse maintained her lead in the young rider classification. Following the withdrawal of Kool, Vos now had a "almost unassailable" lead in the points classification.

Following the stage, media noted that Vollering had only one more stage to make up time, with Niewiadoma noting that Sunday would be "the most important day of my career and maybe my team's existence". Vollering's domestique Fisher-Black noted that "minutes can be made within a few kilometres" on the final climb to Alpe d'Huez. In January 2025, Vollering revealed that the stage had been the hardest of her career owing to anxiety and pressure, noting that she "hit a breaking point" on the stage – and that in hindsight, finishing the stage was the "most meaningful personal victory in the entire Tour de France Femmes".

Stage 7 Result
Rank	Rider	Team	Time
1	Justine Ghekiere (BEL)	AG Insurance–Soudal	4h 26' 58"
2	Maëva Squiban (FRA)	Arkéa–B&B Hotels Women	+ 1' 15"
3	Demi Vollering (NED)	Team SD Worx–Protime	+ 1' 23"
4	Katarzyna Niewiadoma (POL)	Canyon//SRAM	+ 1' 23"
5	Évita Muzic (FRA)	FDJ–Suez	+ 1' 27"
6	Thalita De Jong (NED)	Lotto–Dstny Ladies	+ 1' 28"
7	Puck Pieterse (NED)	Fenix–Deceuninck	+ 1' 28"
8	Juliette Labous (FRA)	Team dsm–firmenich PostNL	+ 1' 28"
9	Pauliena Rooijakkers (NED)	Fenix–Deceuninck	+ 1' 28"
10	Gaia Realini (ITA)	Lidl–Trek	+ 1' 28"

General classification after Stage 7
Rank	Rider	Team	Time
1	Katarzyna Niewiadoma (POL)	Canyon//SRAM	20h 00' 52"
2	Puck Pieterse (NED)	Fenix–Deceuninck	+ 27"
3	Cédrine Kerbaol (FRA)	Ceratizit–WNT Pro Cycling	+ 37"
4	Juliette Labous (FRA)	Team dsm–firmenich PostNL	+ 1' 01"
5	Thalita De Jong (NED)	Lotto–Dstny Ladies	+ 1' 09"
6	Shirin van Anrooij (NED)	Lidl–Trek	+ 1' 12"
7	Pauliena Rooijakkers (NED)	Fenix–Deceuninck	+ 1' 13"
8	Demi Vollering (NED)	Team SD Worx–Protime	+ 1' 15"
9	Évita Muzic (FRA)	FDJ–Suez	+ 1' 25"
10	Justine Ghekiere (BEL)	AG Insurance–Soudal	+ 1' 27"

== Stage 8 ==
18 August 2024 – Le Grand-Bornand to Alpe d'Huez, 149.9 km (93.1 mi)

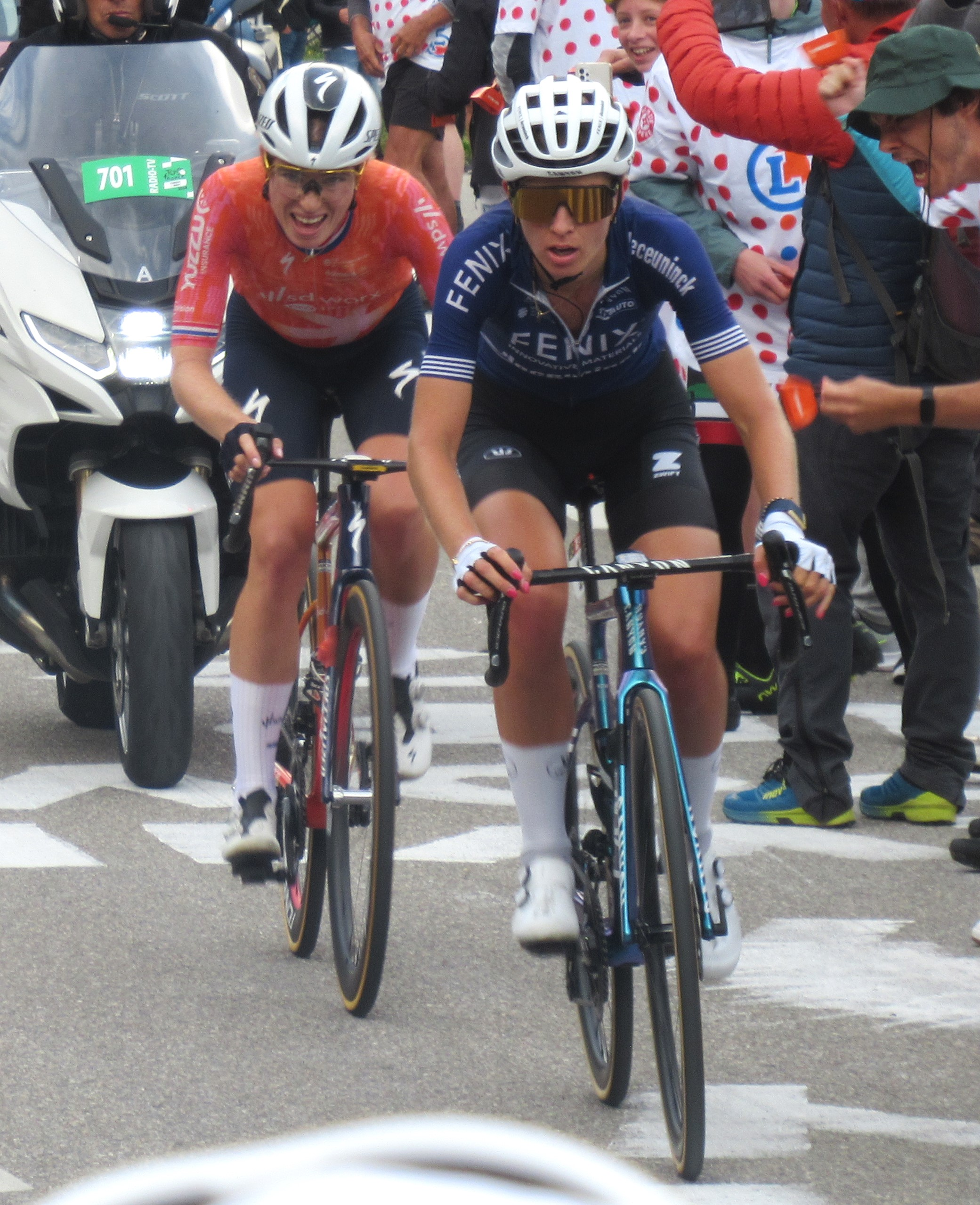
Pauliena Rooijakkers (Fenix–Deceuninck) and Demi Vollering (Team SD Worx–Protime) on Alpe d'Huez

The final stage of the Tour was the queen stage of the race, a 149.9 km (93.1 mi) stage in the French Alps from Le Grand-Bornand to a summit finish at Alpe d'Huez.

The riders tackled three categorised climbs – the second category Col de Tamié (9.5km with an average gradient of 4%), the hors catégorie Col du Glandon (19.7km with an average gradient of 7.2%) at an elevation of 1,924 m (6,312 ft), and finally the hors catégorie Alpe d'Huez (13.8km with an average gradient of 8.1%). The race finished at the summit of Alpe d'Huez, at an elevation of 1,850 m (6,070 ft). The Alpe d'Huez was last featured in a professional women's race in the 1993 Tour Cycliste Féminin.

The stage started with a breakaway of 22 riders, including Ghekiere in the polka-dot jersey, Lippert and Lucinda Brand (Lidl–Trek), as well as four Team SD Worx–Protime riders positioned to support Vollering later in the stage. On the Col de Tamié, Ghekiere took maximum QoM points, increasing her lead in the mountains classification over Pieterse.

The lead of the breakaway fell from 2 min 30 s to under 90 seconds as they approached the bottom of the Col du Glandon. The peloton pushed up the climb at a high pace, slowly reducing to a group of GC favourites. With 2.5 kilometres (1.6 mi) of the climb remaining, Vollering attacked from this group – with only Rooijakkers able to follow her. Niewiadoma stayed with Brand, Évita Muzic (FDJ–Suez) and Gaia Realini (Lidl–Trek), as Vollering and Rooijakkers quickly built up a lead of around a minute by the top of the Glandon. After 20 kilometres (12 mi) of descent into the valley, the pair had a lead of 90 seconds – putting them in the virtual yellow jersey.

On the flat valley road, Niewiadoma worked with Brand, Realini and Muzic to reduce the gap to Vollering and Rooijakkers. At the foot of Alpe d'Huez, with 13.8 kilometres (8.6 mi) of the stage remaining, the gap had fallen to 45 seconds. On the climb, Vollering and Rooijakkers pushed hard to increase the gap to Niewiadoma to over a minute – the pair needed a winning margin of around 1 min 10 s to take the yellow jersey from Niewiadoma. However, Niewiadoma worked with Muzic and Realini to stabilise the gap, with 5 kilometres (3.1 mi) of the climb remaining.

On the final part of the climb Vollering began to tire, with the gap to Niewiadoma falling to around 50 seconds. In the final metres of the stage, Vollering accelerated past Rooijakkers to take her second stage win of the Tour, taking 10 seconds in time bonuses for winning the stage. Around a minute later, Niewiadoma and Muzic crossed the finish line – with Niewiadoma therefore winning the yellow jersey by a margin of four seconds.

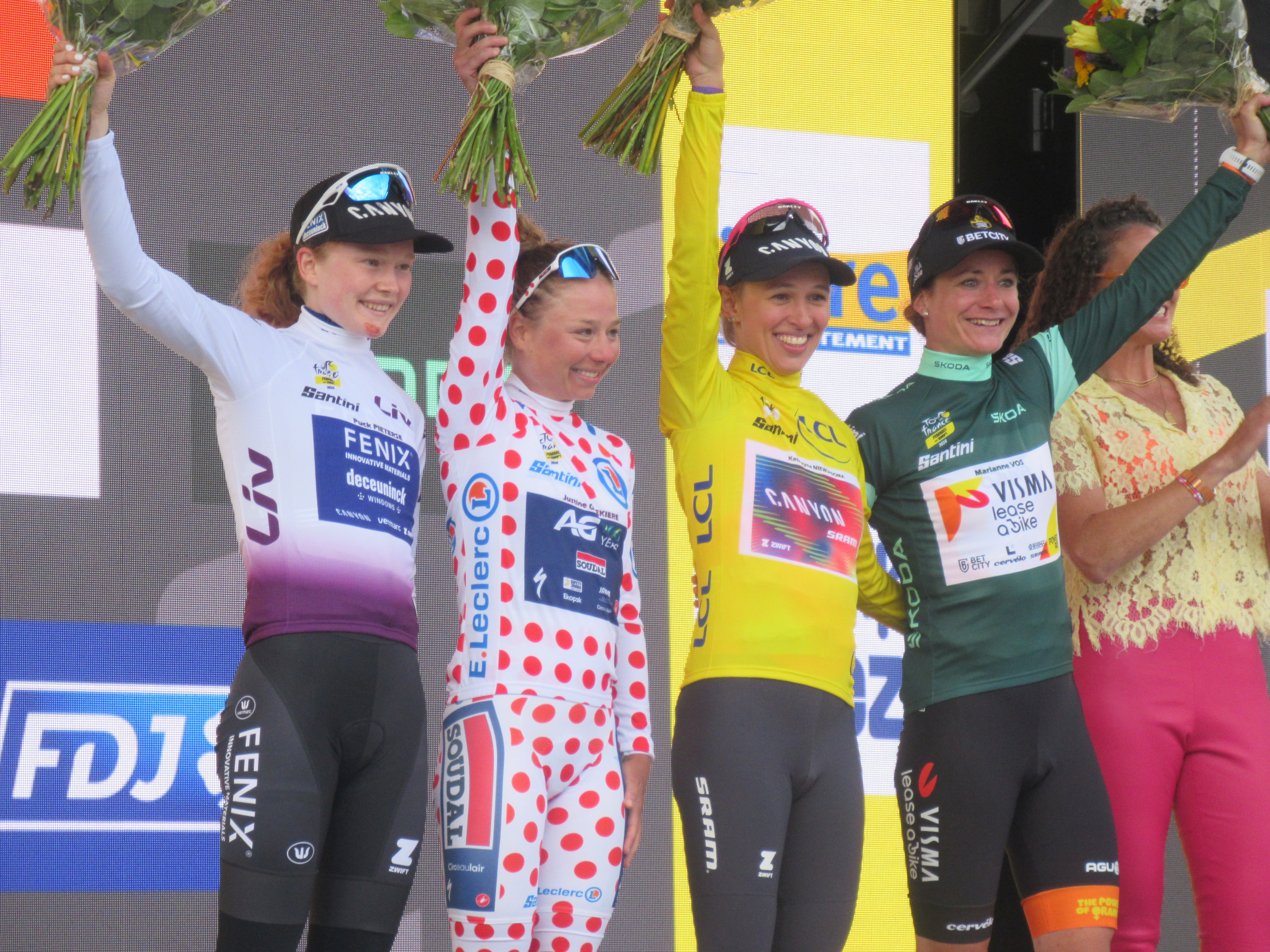
Classification podium, with (left to right) Puck Pieterse, Justine Ghekiere, Kasia Niewiadoma and Marianne Vos

In the final general classification (GC), Kasia Niewiadoma (Canyon//SRAM) won the Tour de France Femmes with an advantage over defending champion Demi Vollering of just four seconds. As well as taking second place, Vollering took the super-combativity award for the most combative rider. Pauliena Rooijakkers (Fenix–Deceuninck) took third place overall after her strong performance on the final stage.

In the race's other classifications, Marianne Vos (Visma–Lease a Bike) won the green jersey of the points classification. Justine Ghekiere (AG Insurance–Soudal) took the polka-dot jersey as winner of the Queen of the Mountains (QoM) classification. Puck Pieterse (Fenix–Deceuninck) took the white jersey as the winner of the young riders classification, which was awarded to the best-placed GC rider under the age of 23. Lidl–Trek won the team classification as the team with the lowest aggregate time among their three best-placed riders. Out of 153 starters, 110 finished the event.

Niewiadoma stated that the win was "a dream come true", noting that she had experienced a "rollercoaster of emotions" on the stage after Vollering accelerated away from her on the Col du Glandon. Niewiadoma hoped that her victory would attract more women to ride and race. Vollering expressed her disappointment in losing by just four seconds, stating "that's a bit sour for me at the moment". Michel Cornelisse, the directeur sportif of Fenix–Deceuninck stated that the race had been "a dream", with Rooijakkers in third place overall and Pieterse winning the young rider classification.

Stage 8 Result
Rank	Rider	Team	Time
1	Demi Vollering (NED)	Team SD Worx–Protime	4h 34' 14"
2	Pauliena Rooijakkers (NED)	Fenix–Deceuninck	+ 4"
3	Évita Muzic (FRA)	FDJ–Suez	+ 1' 01"
4	Katarzyna Niewiadoma (POL)	Canyon//SRAM	+ 1' 01"
5	Gaia Realini (ITA)	Lidl–Trek	+ 1' 31"
6	Cédrine Kerbaol (FRA)	Ceratizit–WNT Pro Cycling	+ 3' 15"
7	Valentina Cavallar (AUT)	Arkéa–B&B Hotels Women	+ 3' 34"
8	Sarah Gigante (AUS)	AG Insurance–Soudal	+ 5' 10"
9	Niamh Fisher-Black (NZL)	Team SD Worx–Protime	+ 5' 14"
10	Lucinda Brand (NED)	Lidl–Trek	+ 7' 06"

General classification after Stage 8
Rank	Rider	Team	Time
1	Katarzyna Niewiadoma (POL)	Canyon//SRAM	24h 36' 07"
2	Demi Vollering (NED)	Team SD Worx–Protime	+ 4"
3	Pauliena Rooijakkers (NED)	Fenix–Deceuninck	+ 10"
4	Évita Muzic (FRA)	FDJ–Suez	+ 1' 21"
5	Gaia Realini (ITA)	Lidl–Trek	+ 2' 19"
6	Cédrine Kerbaol (FRA)	Ceratizit–WNT Pro Cycling	+ 2' 51"
7	Sarah Gigante (AUS)	AG Insurance–Soudal	+ 7' 09"
8	Lucinda Brand (NED)	Lidl–Trek	+ 8' 06"
9	Juliette Labous (FRA)	Team dsm–firmenich PostNL	+ 8' 07"
10	Thalita de Jong (NED)	Lotto–Dstny Ladies	+ 8' 12"
