= Amber Pate =

Australian cyclist

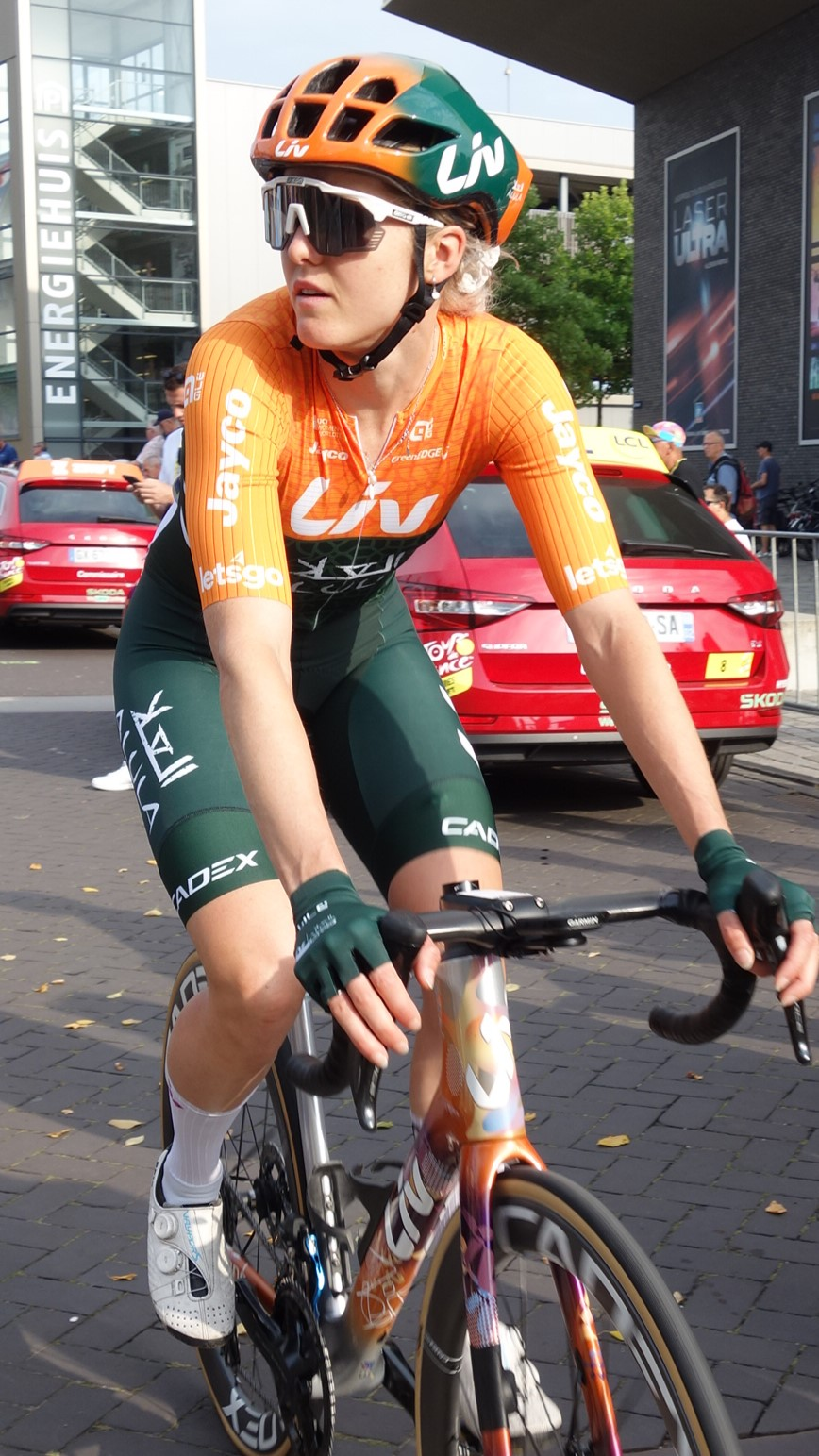
- Amber Pate in 2024

Personal information
- Born: 21 April 1995 (age 31)

Cycling career
- Sport: Cycling
- Current team: Liv AlUla Jayco
- Discipline: Road
- Role: Rider

Amateur team
- 2022: S-Bikes Doltcini

Professional team
- 2023–: Liv AlUla Jayco

Amber Pate (born 21 April 1995) is an Australian professional road racing cyclist, who currently rides for UCI Women's WorldTeam Liv AlUla Jayco.

== Early life ==
Pate was born and raised at Katherine in the Northern Territory. In her youth, she was a keen swimmer.

She undertook university studies in Adelaide, South Australia, switching degrees from nursing, to finance, and then clinical exercise physiology.

== Career ==
Pate initially competed in triathlon and excelled, taking 3rd place in the Australian Elite Under 23 Series and qualifying for her professional license. Her strength in cycling was apparent, and she ultimately decided to focus solely on cycling starting in since 2020.

In August 2022, Pate was selected to join UCI Women's WorldTeam Team BikeExchange–Jayco, an Australian cycling team.

== Major results ==
2021
4th Road race, National Road Championships
2022
Oceania Road Championships

2nd Time trial
3rd Road race

2nd Time trial, National Road Championships
2023
1st Criterium, National Road Championships
2025
1st Criterium, National Road Championships
