= Anna van Wersch =

Dutch psychologist

- Other name: Anneke van Wersch

Academic background
- Education: Radboud University Nijmegen; Queen's University Belfast (PhD)

Academic work
- Discipline: Psychology
- Sub-discipline: Health psychology; Social psychology; Sport psychology
- Institutions: Teesside University

Anna van Wersch is a Dutch psychologist and professor emeritus of psychology at Teesside University. Her research has focused on health, social and sport psychology. She was elected a Fellow of the British Psychological Society in 2012.

== Education and career ==
Van Wersch studied psychology at the University of Nijmegen (now Radboud University Nijmegen) and completed a PhD in psychology at Queen's University Belfast in 1991.

She joined Teesside University as a senior lecturer in psychology in 1997, after working for five years at the Daniel den Hoed Cancer Clinic in Rotterdam. She later became Reader and then Professor of Psychology at Teesside. Van Wersch also conducted research at Newcastle University's Centre for Health Services Research. She became professor emeritus after retiring from Teesside in 2017.

== Research ==
Van Wersch's early research focused on sport and exercise psychology, including motivation and participation in physical education. In a 1992 study published in the British Journal of Educational Psychology, she examined age and gender differences in secondary-school pupils' interest in physical education.

Her health psychology research included breast cancer care and medical decision-making. She co-authored the book Continuity of Information with Breast Cancer in 1994. In 1997, she co-authored a study on continuity of information and multidisciplinary care for breast cancer patients. In 1998, she co-authored a British Medical Journal paper on a randomized trial of early discharge after breast cancer surgery. She also conducted research on decision-making about breast cancer treatment and reconstruction.

While working at Newcastle University, Van Wersch researched patient involvement in the development of evidence-based clinical guidelines. In 2003, she co-authored Non-Medical Influences upon Medical Decision-Making and Referral Behavior, which examined non-clinical factors affecting medical decisions and patient referrals.

In 2009, Van Wersch co-developed the Sports Mental Toughness Questionnaire with Michael Sheard and Jim Golby, a 14-item measure of mental toughness in athletes. She also co-authored a study on attitudes and trust toward the use of a male contraceptive pill and co-authored the book Complementary Medicine and Health Psychology. The book explored the relationship between health psychology and complementary and alternative medicine, including health beliefs, placebo effects, stress and coping, and chronic illness.

In 2015, she co-authored a systematic review examining the psychosocial impact of caring for people with Parkinson's disease. She also examined how adult-onset epilepsy affects identity and the experience of the body.

Her research also examined binge drinking in Britain, including its relationship with workplace pressures and socialising in north-east England, in a co-authored study.
