= 2015 Drapac Cycling season =

Drapac Cycling
- 2015 season
- UCI code: DPC
- Status: UCI Professional Continental
- Manager: Agostino Giramondo
- Main sponsor(s): Drapac Group
- Based: Australia
- Bicycles: Swiftcarbon

Season victories
- One-day races: -
- Stage race overall: -
- Stage race stages: 9

The 2015 season for the Australian Drapac Professional Cycling team began in January at the Tour Down Under. The team participated in UCI Continental Circuits and UCI World Tour events when given a wildcard invitation.

== 2015 roster ==
Rider	Date of birth
Graeme Brown (AUS)	9 April 1979 (aged 35)
Will Clarke (AUS)	11 April 1985 (aged 29)
Brad Evans (Note: Evans joined the team on 1 August as a stagiaire.) (NZL)	8 May 1992 (aged 22)
Dylan Girdlestone (RSA)	11 October 1989 (aged 25)
Robbie Hucker (AUS)	13 March 1990 (aged 24)
Brenton Jones (AUS)	12 December 1991 (aged 23)
Jordan Kerby (AUS)	15 August 1992 (aged 22)
Martin Kohler (SUI)	17 July 1985 (aged 29)
Peter Koning (NED)	3 December 1990 (aged 24)
Darren Lapthorne (AUS)	4 March 1983 (aged 31)

Rider	Date of birth
Travis Meyer (AUS)	8 June 1989 (aged 25)
Lachlan Norris (AUS)	21 January 1987 (aged 27)
Cameron Peterson (AUS)	4 December 1983 (aged 31)
Adam Phelan (AUS)	23 August 1991 (aged 23)
Tim Roe (AUS)	28 October 1989 (aged 25)
Malcolm Rudolph (AUS)	4 January 1989 (aged 25)
Samuel Spokes (AUS)	16 April 1992 (aged 22)
Bernard Sulzberger (AUS)	5 December 1983 (aged 31)
Wouter Wippert (NED)	14 August 1990 (aged 24)

Riders who joined the team for the 2015 season

Rider	2014 team
Graeme Brown	Belkin Pro Cycling
Dylan Girdlestone	neo-pro (Bonitas)
Brenton Jones	neo-pro (Avanti Racing)
Martin Kohler	BMC Racing Team
Peter Koning	neo-pro (Metec-TKH)
Cameron Peterson	neo-pro (Peloton Sports)
Tim Roe	Team Budget Forklifts
Samuel Spokes	neo-pro (Etixx)

Riders who left the team during or after the 2014 season

Rider	2015 team
Jack Anderson	Team Budget Forklifts
Jonathan Cantwell	
David Jai Crawford	Kinan
Floris Goesinnen	Retired
Benjamin Johnson	
Thomas Palmer	Retired
Wesley Sulzberger	Navitas Satalyst Racing team

== Season victories ==
Date	Race	Competition	Rider	Country	Location
25 January	Tour Down Under, Stage 6	UCI World Tour	Wouter Wippert (NED)	Australia	Adelaide
4 February	Herald Sun Tour, Prologue	UCI Oceania Tour	Will Clarke (AUS)	Australia	Melbourne
22 March	Tour de Taiwan, Stage 1	UCI Asia Tour	Wouter Wippert (NED)	Taiwan	Taipei
24 March	Tour de Taiwan, Stage 3	UCI Asia Tour	Wouter Wippert (NED)	Taiwan	Changhua County
17 May	Tour of Japan, Stage 1	UCI Asia Tour	Brenton Jones (AUS)	Japan	Sakai
7 June	Tour de Korea, Stage 1	UCI Asia Tour	Wouter Wippert (NED)	South Korea	Gumi
12 June	Tour de Korea, Stage 6	UCI Asia Tour	Wouter Wippert (NED)	South Korea	Gunsan
9 August	Tour of Utah, Stage 7	UCI America Tour	Lachlan Norris (AUS)	United States	Park City
28 October	Tour of Hainan, Stage 9	UCI Asia Tour	Brenton Jones (AUS)	China	Xinglong County
