= 2016 Drapac Cycling season =

Drapac Cycling
- 2016 season
- UCI code: DPC
- Status: UCI Professional Continental
- Manager: Agostino Giramondo
- Main sponsor(s): Drapac Group
- Based: Australia
- Bicycles: Swiftcarbon

Season victories
- Stage race stages: 12

The 2016 season for the Drapac Professional Cycling team began in January at the Tour Down Under and Tour de San Luis. The team participated in UCI Continental Circuits and UCI World Tour events when given a wildcard invitation.

== 2016 roster ==
Rider	Date of birth
Graeme Brown (AUS)	9 April 1979 (aged 36)
Brendan Canty (AUS)	17 January 1992 (aged 23)
Will Clarke (AUS)	11 April 1985 (aged 30)
Nathan Earle (AUS)	4 June 1988 (aged 27)
Brad Evans (Note: Evans joined the team on 1 April.) (NZL)	8 May 1992 (aged 23)
Brenton Jones (AUS)	12 December 1991 (aged 24)
Jordan Kerby (AUS)	15 August 1992 (aged 23)
Peter Koning (NED)	3 December 1990 (aged 25)
Jason Lowndes (AUS)	14 December 1994 (aged 21)

Rider	Date of birth
Gavin Mannion (USA)	24 August 1991 (aged 24)
Travis Meyer (AUS)	8 June 1989 (aged 26)
Jens Mouris (NED)	12 March 1980 (aged 35)
Lachlan Norris (AUS)	21 January 1987 (aged 28)
Adam Phelan (AUS)	23 August 1991 (aged 24)
Tim Roe (AUS)	28 October 1989 (aged 26)
Tom Scully (NZL)	14 January 1990 (aged 25)
Samuel Spokes (AUS)	16 April 1992 (aged 23)
Bernard Sulzberger (AUS)	5 December 1983 (aged 32)

Riders who joined the team for the 2016 season

Rider	2015 team
Brendan Canty	Team Budget Forklifts
Jens Mouris	Orica–GreenEDGE

Riders who left the team during or after the 2015 season

Rider	2016 team
Wouter Wippert	Cannondale
Robbie Hucker	Avanti IsoWhey Sports
Cameron Peterson	
Darren Lapthorne	Retired
Malcolm Rudolph	
Dylan Girdlestone	
Martin Kohler	Team Roth

== Season victories ==
Date	Race	Competition	Rider	Country	Location
20 January	Tour de San Luis, Stage 3	UCI America Tour	Peter Koning (NED)	Argentina	La Punta
3 February	Herald Sun Tour, Prologue	UCI Oceania Tour	Will Clarke (AUS)	Australia	Melbourne
21 February	Tour of Oman, Youth classification	UCI Asia Tour	Brendan Canty (AUS)	Oman	
6 March	Tour de Taiwan, Stage 1	UCI Asia Tour	Will Clarke (AUS)	Taiwan	Taipei
9 March	Tour de Taiwan, Stage 4	UCI Asia Tour	Will Clarke (AUS)	Taiwan	Xiangshan Visitor Center
14 May	Tour of Iran (Azerbaijan), Stage 2	UCI Asia Tour	Peter Koning (NED)	Iran	Jolfa
5 June	Boucles de la Mayenne, Stage 3	UCI Europe Tour	Tom Scully (NZL)	France	Laval
8 June	Tour de Korea, Stage 4	UCI Asia Tour	Brenton Jones (AUS)	South Korea	Daejeon
11 June	Tour de Korea, Stage 7	UCI Asia Tour	Brad Evans (AUS)	South Korea	Seoul
12 June	Tour de Korea, Stage 8	UCI Asia Tour	Brenton Jones (AUS)	South Korea	Seoul
12 June	Tour de Korea, Points classification	UCI Asia Tour	Brenton Jones (AUS)	South Korea	
2 July	Tour of Austria, Prologue	UCI Europe Tour	Will Clarke (AUS)	Austria	Kitzbüheler Horn
5 July	Tour of Austria, Stage 3	UCI Europe Tour	Brendan Canty (AUS)	Austria	Sonntagberg
30 July	Volta a Portugal, Stage 3	UCI Europe Tour	Will Clarke (AUS)	Portugal	Macedo de Cavaleiros
