= 2014 Drapac Cycling season =

Professional cycling season

2014 Drapac Cycling season
Manager	Agostino Giramondo
One-day victories	–
Stage race overall victories	–
Stage race stage victories	11
Previous season • Next season

The 2014 season for the Drapac Professional Cycling team began in January at the Tour Down Under. The team participated in UCI Continental Circuits and UCI World Tour events when given a wildcard invitation.

In November 2013 the team was promoted from UCI Continental to Professional Continental status.

== 2014 roster ==
As of 1 February 2014.

Rider	Date of birth
Jack Anderson (AUS)	2 June 1987 (aged 26)
Jonathan Cantwell (AUS)	8 January 1982 (aged 32)
Brendan Canty (Note: Canty joined the team on 1 August as a stagiaire.) (AUS)	17 January 1992 (aged 22)
Will Clarke (AUS)	11 April 1985 (aged 28)
Jai Crawford (AUS)	4 August 1983 (aged 30)
Floris Goesinnen (NED)	30 October 1983 (aged 30)
Robbie Hucker (AUS)	13 March 1990 (aged 23)
Ben Johnson (AUS)	7 January 1983 (aged 31)
Jordan Kerby (AUS)	15 August 1992 (aged 21)

Rider	Date of birth
Darren Lapthorne (AUS)	4 March 1983 (aged 30)
Travis Meyer (AUS)	8 June 1989 (aged 24)
Lachlan Norris (AUS)	21 January 1987 (aged 27)
Thomas Palmer (AUS)	28 June 1990 (aged 23)
Adam Phelan (AUS)	23 August 1991 (aged 22)
Malcolm Rudolph (AUS)	4 January 1989 (aged 25)
Bernard Sulzberger (AUS)	5 December 1983 (aged 30)
Wesley Sulzberger (AUS)	20 October 1986 (aged 27)
Wouter Wippert (NED)	14 August 1990 (aged 23)

Riders who joined the team for the 2014 season

Rider	2013 team
Jack Anderson	neo-pro (Budget Forklifts)
Jonathan Cantwell	Saxo–Tinkoff
Will Clarke	Argos–Shimano
Jai Crawford	neo-pro (Huon Salmon–Genesys Wealth Advisers)
Ben Johnson	ex-pro (FRF Couriers, 2008)
Jordan Kerby	neo-pro (Christina Watches–Onfone)
Travis Meyer	Orica–GreenEDGE
Lachlan Norris	neo-pro (Team Raleigh)
Wesley Sulzberger	Orica–GreenEDGE
Wouter Wippert	neo-pro (Team 3M)

Riders who left the team during or after the 2013 season

Rider	2014 team
Luke Davison	Synergy Baku
Amir Mustafa Rusli	
Gordon McCauley	
Rhys Pollock	CharterMason Giant Racing
Johnnie Walker	
William Walker	Synergy Baku

== Season victories ==
Date	Race	Competition	Rider	Country	Location
30 January	New Zealand Cycle Classic, Stage 2	UCI Oceania Tour	Wouter Wippert (NED)	New Zealand	Palmerston North
2 February	New Zealand Cycle Classic, Stage 4	UCI Oceania Tour	Wouter Wippert (NED)	New Zealand	Palmerston North
9 February	Herald Sun Tour, Sprints classification	UCI Oceania Tour	Jack Anderson (AUS)	Australia	
27 February	Tour de Taiwan, Stage 3	UCI Asia Tour	Wouter Wippert (NED)	Taiwan	Changhua County
18 May	Tour of Japan, Stage 1	UCI Asia Tour	Will Clarke (AUS)	Japan	Sakai
20 May	Tour of Japan, Stage 2	UCI Asia Tour	Wouter Wippert (NED)	Japan	Mino
29 May	Tour de Kumano, Prologue	UCI Asia Tour	Will Clarke (AUS)	Japan	Shingū
30 May	Tour de Kumano, Stage 1	UCI Asia Tour	Wouter Wippert (NED)	Japan	Shingū
1 June	Tour de Kumano, Stage 3	UCI Asia Tour	Wouter Wippert (NED)	Japan	Taiji Hanto
1 June	Tour de Kumano, Points classification	UCI Asia Tour	Wouter Wippert (NED)	Japan	
18 June	Tour of Iran, Stage 2	UCI Asia Tour	Will Clarke (AUS)	Iran	Aras
22 June	Tour of Iran, Points classification	UCI Asia Tour	Will Clarke (AUS)	Iran	
12 September	Tour of China II, Stage 4	UCI Asia Tour	Wouter Wippert (NED)	China	Laohekou
29 October	Tour of Hainan, Stage 9	UCI Asia Tour	Wouter Wippert (NED)	China	Chengmai
