= Sam Witmitz =

Australian bicycle racer

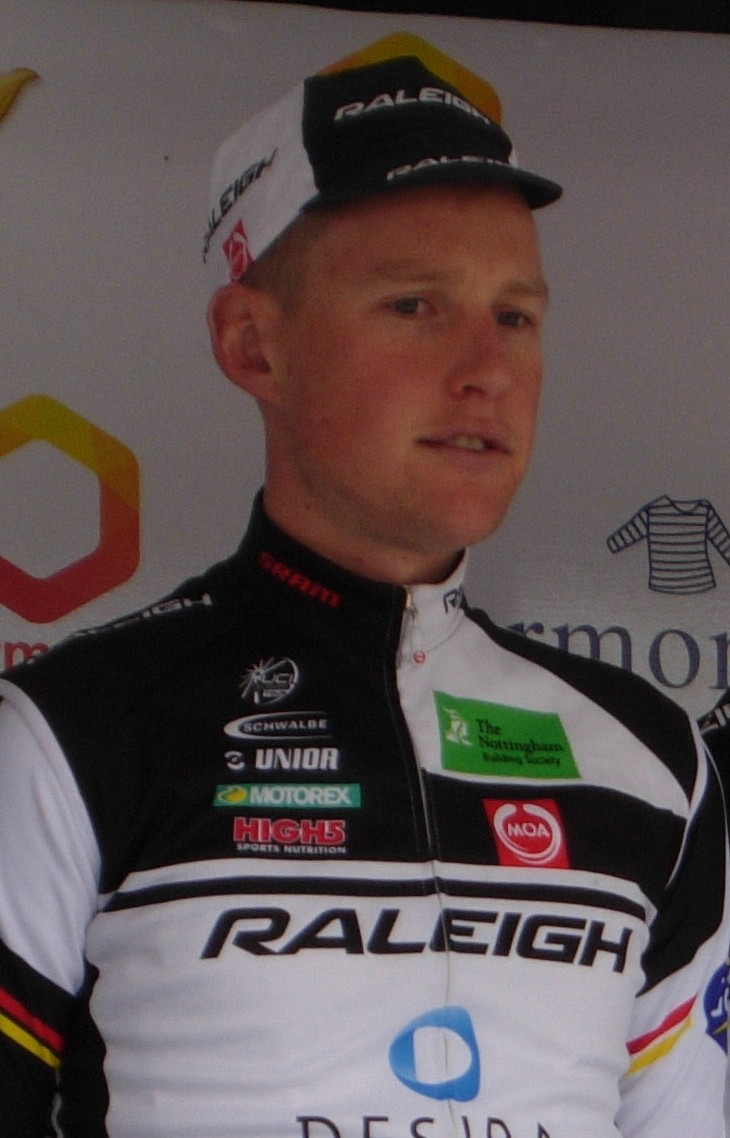
- Witmitz in 2013

Personal information
- Full name: Sam Witmitz
- Born: 17 March 1985 (age 41)

Cycling career
- Sport: Cycling
- Current team: Retired
- Discipline: Road
- Role: Rider

Professional teams
- 2011: LeTua Cycling Team
- 2012: Team Budget Forklifts
- 2013: Team Raleigh
- 2014–2015: Team Budget Forklifts

Sam Witmitz (born 17 March 1985) is an Australian former professional cyclist.

== Major results ==
2009
4th Time trial, Oceania Road Championships
2010
2nd Overall Melaka Governor's Cup
2014
1st Overall Tour of Taihu Lake

1st Points classification
1st Stages 3, 6 & 7

9th Tour of Yancheng Coastal Wetlands
