= Austral Wheel Race =

2000m track handicap bicycle race

Race details
- Region: Victoria, Australia
- Type: Handicap race over 2000 m

History
- First winner: H. Lambton, Australia
- Most wins: Stephen Pate, Australia, (4)
- Most recent: Graeme Frislie, Australia and Georgia Baker, Australia

The Austral Wheel Race is the oldest track bicycle race in the world still existing, stretching back to 1887. It is owned and run by AusCycling Victoria. The Austral race is Australia's greatest track cycling event. It is held in Melbourne, riders assigned handicaps according to ability over a series of heats. The finals are run over 2000m.

The races in 2004 and 2005 were at John Cain Arena in February. The first race in 1887 held at Melbourne Cricket Ground over 3 miles (4800m), with first prize of a grand piano valued at 200 pounds. Other venues in Melbourne to host the race include the Exhibition Track, the North Essendon board track, the Olympic Park Velodrome and the Brunswick, Coburg and Northcote velodromes.

Malvern Star, a brand in bicycles in Australia, had its origins in the race. In December 1898 a young bicycle mechanic and professional cyclist, Tom Finnigan, won from a handicap of 220 yards (200 m) holding off backmarkers with a foot to spare. The prize of 240 sovereigns let him establish a suburban bicycle shop, Malvern Star Cycles, which became a household name under Bruce Small.

Corruption tinged the event in 1901 when the American, Bill Martin, won from scratch, to allegations of fixing by John Wren. According to The Age in 1903 referring to 1902 "one of the judges appointed to officiate at the Austral Wheel meeting was called upon to resign, because he had a monetary interest in the result of the Austral Wheel Race."

In December 2023 Graeme Frislie won from scratch in record time of 1min 55.03 sec, an average of 62.59 km/h at DISC.

== Prize money ==
Prize money has varied, following the fashion for cycling, from a grand piano to monetary prizes of 240 sovereigns in 1898, 450 sovereigns in 1902, to a low of $1500 during the 1970s, increasing to $5,000 in 1982, and exceeding $18,000 since 2000.

== Past winners ==
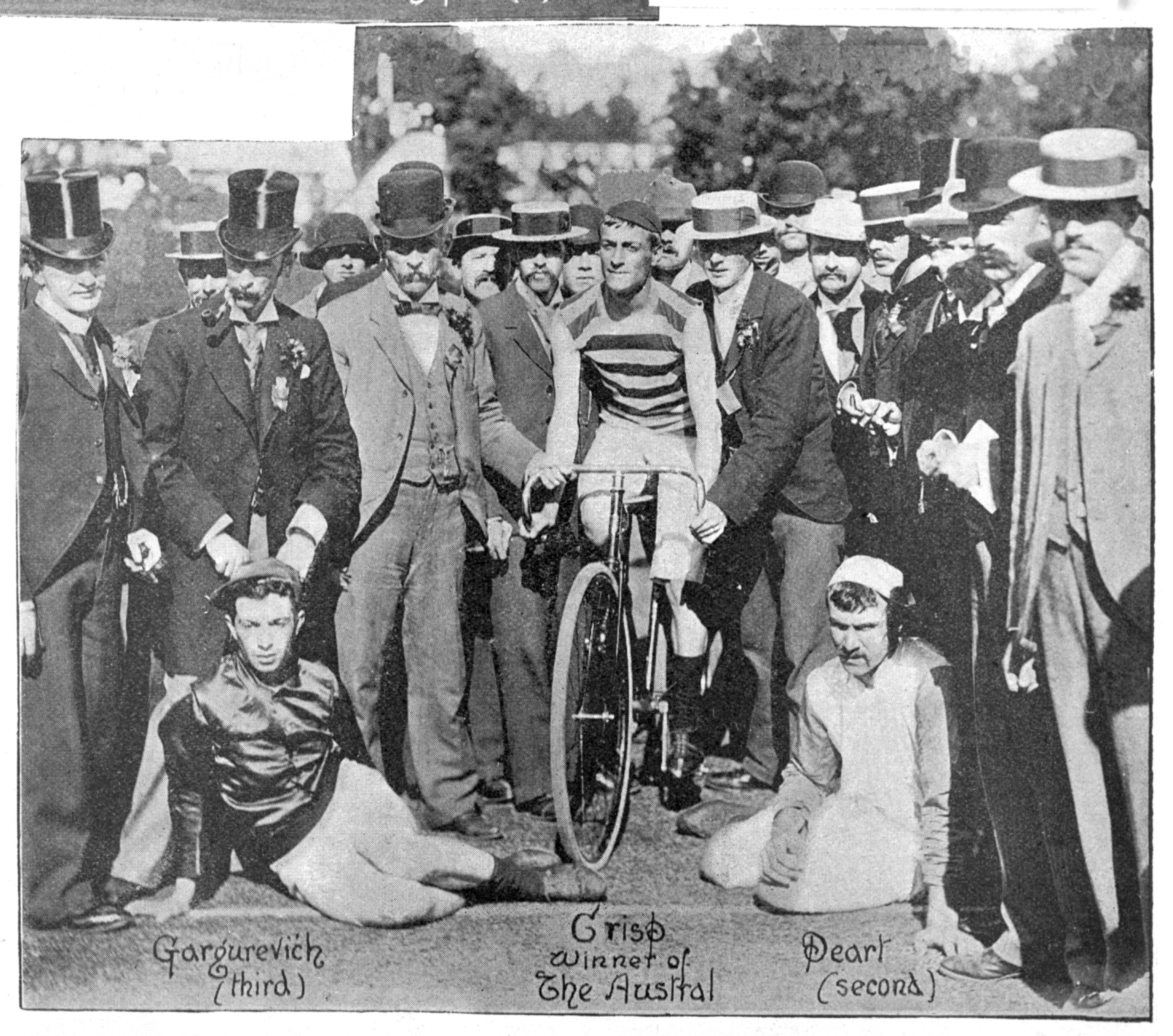
Crisp winner of the Austral 1895 with Pearl (second) and Gargurevich (third)

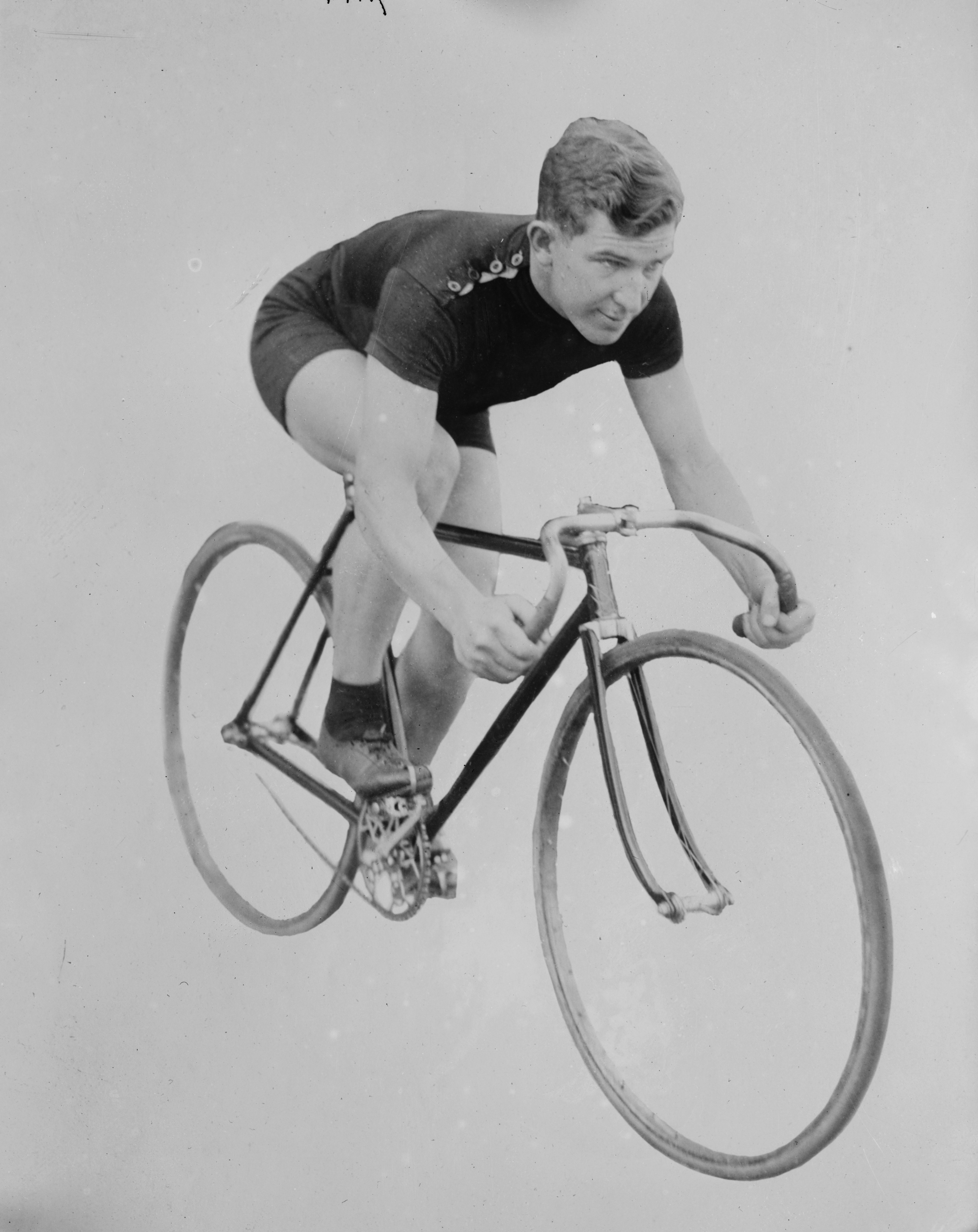
1904 Winner: Jackie Clark

Past competitors include distinguished Australian and international cyclists, including Jackie Clark, Gordon Johnson, Steele Bishop, Sid Patterson, Russell Mockridge, Danny Clarke, Brett Aitken, Gary Neiwand and Shane Kelly.

The record for the most wins belongs to Victorian Stephen Pate with four victories: in 1988 from scratch, in 1991 from minus 10m, in 1993 from minus 20m and 1999 from scratch.

In 2000, Neiwand was handicapped on 70m for the millennium edition and won comfortably.

Austral Wheel Race Winners
	Year	Venue	Men's Winner	Handicap	Ref.	Women's Winner	Handicap
1	1887 (Note: Ridden on ordinary or Penny-farthing bicycles)	MCG	Harry H. Lambton	210 yd (190 m)			
2	1888	MCG	Dick Davis	Scr			
3	1889	MCG	Jimmy Mullins	140 yd (130 m)			
4	1890	MCG	Tom Busst	Scr.			
5	1891	MCG	Arthur Turner	240 yd (220 m)			
6	1892	MCG	Harry H. Lambton	200 yd (180 m)			
7	1893	MCG	Gordon Woodward	270 yd (250 m)			
8	1894	MCG	Alf Middleton	180 yd (160 m)			
9	1895	MCG	Alfred Crisp	250 yd (230 m)			
10	1896	MCG	Charles Kellow	15 yd (14 m)			
11	1897	MCG	Jim Carpenter	85 yd (78 m)			
12	1898	MCG	Tom Finnigan	220 yd (200 m)			
13	1899	MCG	Percy R. Beauchamp	150 yd (140 m)			
14	1900	MCG	Charles Forbes	30 yd (27 m)			
15	1901	MCG	Bill Martin	Scr			
16	1902	MCG	Fred (Murray) Auger	240 yd (220 m)			
17	1903	MCG	Fred Scheps	160 yd (150 m)			
18	1904	EXA	A J "Jackie" Clark	150 yd (140 m)			
19	1905	EXA	J. Sandberg	170 yd (160 m)			
20	1906	EXA	Harry Thomas	20 yd (18 m)			
21	1907	MCG	Andrew Charles "Froggie" Colvin	150 yd (140 m)			
22	1908	MCG	M. McPherson	280 yd (260 m)			
23	1909	MCG	Albert H. Pianta	210 yd (190 m)			
24	1910	MCG	Frank Corry	140 yd (130 m)			
25	1912	EXI	W. Priestly	60 yd (55 m)			
26	1913	EXI	P.B. Henry	60 yd (55 m)			
27	1920	EXA	Ern. Tamme	50 yd (46 m)			
28	1921	EXA	Lou Clifford	120 yd (110 m)			
29	1922	EXA	Jack Fitzgerald	Scr			
30	1923	EXA	Dick Ford	120 yd (110 m)			
31	1923	MD	Pidge Davis	200 yd (180 m)			
32	1925	MD	Frank Corry	140 yd (130 m)			
33	1925	EXA	Eric Giboud	60 yd (55 m)			
34	1927 (Note: Same Year, Different Season, Venues & Promoters)	EXA	Bowie Stevens	70 yd (64 m)			
35	1927	MD	Cecil Hannerman	160 yd (150 m)			
36	1927	MD	Cecil Manners	245 yd (224 m)			
37	1929	MD	Richard “Fatty” Lamb	30 yd (27 m)			
38	1936 (Note: Same Year, Different Season)	MD	Keith Thurgood	100 yd (91 m)			
39	1936	EXB	Harry Webb	70 yd (64 m)			
40	1937	EXB	Jack Gardiner	205 yd (187 m)			
41	1938	EXB	Jack Middleton	120 yd (110 m)			
42	1939	NE	Clinton Beasley	90 yd (82 m)			
43	1940	NE	Norm Stevens	20 yd (18 m)			
44	1941	NE	Ken Stewart	60 yd (55 m)			
45	1942	NE	Mick Bradley	160 yd (150 m)			
46	1944	NE	Norm Munro	90 yd (82 m)			
47	1944	NE	Tas Johnson (Note: 1973 winner Gordon Johnson is the son of 1944 winner Tas. Johnson.)	30 yd (27 m)			
48	1945	NE	Tom Shillito	160 yd (150 m)			
49	1946	NE	Pat Devine	120 yd (110 m)			
50	1947	NE	George Bull	130 yd (120 m)			
51	1948	NE	Bill Kirkham	120 yd (110 m)			
52	1950	NE	Byron Bonney	120 yd (110 m)			
53	1951	NE	Kevin Marion	105 yd (96 m)			
54	1952	NE	Doug Jennings	120 yd (110 m)			
55	1953	NE	Tom Fitzgerald	140 yd (130 m)			
56	1954	NE	Alan Geddes	130 yd (120 m)			
57	1955	NE	Ron Murray	100 yd (91 m)			
58	1956	NE	Don Meharg	130 yd (120 m)			
59	1957	NE	John Robertson	100 yd (91 m)			
60	1958	OP	Neil Geraghty	100 yd (91 m)			
61	1959	OP	Vin Beasley	100 yd (91 m)			
62	1960	OP	David Good	100 yd (91 m)			
63	1961	OP	Fred Roche	40 yd (37 m)			
64	1962	OP	Sid Patterson	Scr			
65	1963	OP	Fred Hellyer	110 yd (100 m)			
66	1964	OP	Sid Patterson	Scr.			
67	1965	OP	Kenton Smith	135 yd (123 m)			
68	1966	OP	Bill Dove	150 yd (140 m)			
69	1967	OP	Victor Browne	65 yd (59 m)			
70	1968	OP	Merv. Andrea	230 yd (210 m)			
71	1969	OP	Charlie Walsh	50 yd (46 m)			
72	1970	OP	Bill Stevens	35 yd (32 m)			
73	1971	BV	Frank Daly	135 yd (123 m)			
74	1972	BV	Geoff Edmonds	20 yd (18 m)			
75	1973	BV	Gordon Johnson	Scr.			
76	1974	BV	Ivan Collings	90 yd (82 m)			
77	1975	NV	Craig Price	130 yd (120 m)			
78	1976	NV	David Allan	70 yd (64 m)			
79	1977	NV	Danny Clark	Scr.			
80	1978	CV	David Sanders (Note: 2009 winner Ben Sanders is the son of 1978 winner David Sanders.)	50 m			
81	1979	CV	Laurie Venn	Scr.			
82	1980	CV	Daryl Benson	90 m			
83	1981	CV	Laurie Venn	Scr.			
84	1982	NV	Steele Bishop	Scr.			
85	1983	NV	Phil Sawyer	Scr.			
86	1984	NV	Terry Schintler	80 m			
87	1985	NV	Allan Rackstraw	80 m			
88	1986	CV	Danny Clark	Scr.			
89	1987	NV	Simon King	110 m			
90	1988	NV	Stephen Pate	Scr.			
91	1989	NV	Grant Reynolds	150 m			
92	1990	NV	Danny Clark	Scr.			
93	1991	NV	Stephen Pate	Minus 10 m			
94	1992	NV	Bert Glennon	120 m			
95	1993	NV	Stephen Pate	Minus 20 m			
96	1994	NV	Ashley Harding	140 m			
97	1995	NV	Tony Hughes	80 m			
98	1996	NV	Troy Clarke	45 m			
99	1997	NV	Matthew Atkins	100 m			
100	1998	NV	Shane Hodskiss	75 m			
101	1999	NV	Stephen Pate	Scr.			
102	2000	NV	Gary Neiwand	70 m		Helen Ingpen	210 m
103	2001	JCA	Mark French	80 m		Leeanne Manderson	
104	2002	JCA	Darren Young	Scr.		Kristine Bayley	Scr.
105	2003	JCA	Darren Young	Scr.			
106	2004	JCA	Zak Dempster	90 m		Jenny Macpherson	
107	2005	JCA	Ben Kersten	Scr.		Rahna Demarte	
108	2006	JCA	Dean Taylor	130 m		Livia Gluchowska	85 m
109	2007	JCA	Joel Stewart	110 m		Uracca Leow	85 m
110	2008	JCA	Jackson-Leigh Rathbone	40 m			
111	2009	JCA	Shane Perkins	15 m			
112	2009	DISC	Ben Sanders	80 m			
113	2011	DISC	Luke Ockerby	45 m		Annette Edmondson	Scr.
114	2012	DISC	Luke Parker	90 m		Annette Edmondson	Scr.
115	2013	DISC	Jason Niblett	90 m		Caitlin Ward	20 m
116	2014	DISC	Minori Shimmura (JPN)	105 m		Annina Gallagher	230 m
117	2014	JCA	Zach Williams (NZ)	105 m		Brooke Tucker	110 m
118	2015	JCA	Mitch Bullen	50 m		Annette Edmondson	Scr.
119	2016	JCA	Stephen Cuff	95 m		Brooklyn Vonderwall	125 m
120	2017	JCA	Zachary Marshall	80 m		Kristina Clonan	30 m
121	2018	JCA	Sam Gallagher	90 m		Stephanie Corset	165 m
122	2019	JCA	Kelland O'Brien	Scr.		Georgia Baker	Scr.
123	2021	DISC	Sam Gallagher	Scr.		Lucinda Stewart	Scr.
124	2022	DISC	Dalton Stretton	105 m		Maeve Plouffe	Scr.
125	2022	DISC	Kelland O'Brien	Scr.		Alexandra Manly	15 m
126	2023	DISC	Graeme Frislie	Scr.		Georgia Baker	Scr.
127	2024	DISC	Noah Blannin	210 m		Clauda Marcks	80 m
128	2025	DISC	Liam Walsh	15 m		Leani Van Der Berg	90 m

== Venues ==
Venues
	Venue	Surface	Years
BV	Brunswick Velodrome	Cement	1971–1974
CV	Coburg Velodrome	Cement	1978–1981 1986
DISC	Darebin International Sports Centre	Timber	2009–2014, 2021–Present
EXA	Exhibition Track	Asphalt	1904–1906, 1920–1923 1925–1927
EXB	Exhibition Board Track	Timber	1936–1938
EXI	Exhibition Indoor Track	Timber	1912–1913
JCA	John Cain Arena	Timber	2001–2009, 2014–2019
MCG	Melbourne Cricket Ground	Grass	1887–1903 1907–1910
MD	Motordrome (Olympic Park)	Cement	1923–1925 1927–1936
NE	North Essendon Board Track	Timber	1939–1957
NV	Northcote Velodrome	Cement	1975–1977 1982–1985 1988–2000
OP	Olympic Park Velodrome	Timber	1958–1970
