= Jimmy Mullins =

Australian cyclist

Personal information
- Full name: James Joseph Mullins
- Born: 17 July 1863 Norwood, South Australia
- Died: 26 November 1911 (aged 48) Norwood

Cycling career
- Sport: Cycling
- Discipline: Track

James Joseph Mullins (17 July 1863 – 26 November 1911) was an Australian football player and track racing cyclist. His most emblematic win was in the third annual Austral Wheel Race in 1889.

== Australian Football ==
Mullins, who was a carpenter by trade, ended up playing for five South Australian Football Association clubs: Victorians in 1882, South Park in 1884, Norwood in 1885 and 1886, South Adelaide in 1886 and West Adelaide in 1887.

== Cycling ==
After finishing his football career he became a member of the Norwood Bicycle Club. In his new found sport he proved to be more successful, winning £400 in trophies in four years. The highlight of his career came on 23 November 1889. Riding a penny-farthing bicycle, in front of 15 to 20,000 spectators at the Melbourne Cricket Ground, he won the two-mile Austral Wheel Race. A week later he would add the Australian 10 Mile Championship scratch race to that.

== Palmares ==
1889
1st Austral Wheel Race
1st 10 Miles Championship of Australia
