= Luke Parker (cyclist) =

Australian cyclist (born 1993)

Personal information
- Full name: Luke Parker
- Born: 21 October 1993 (age 32) Melbourne, Victoria, Australia

Cycling career
- Sport: Cycling
- Current team: Attaque Team Gusto
- Discipline: Road cycling/Track cycling
- Role: Rider

Amateur team
- 2006–: Carnegie Caulfield Cycling Club

Professional teams
- 2013: OCBC Singapore Continental Cycling Team
- 2014–2015: Cipollini Iseo Serrature Rime
- 2016: State of Matter MAAP Racing
- 2016: Attaque Team Gusto

Major wins
- 2012 Austral Wheel Race 2014 Melbourne Cup on Wheels

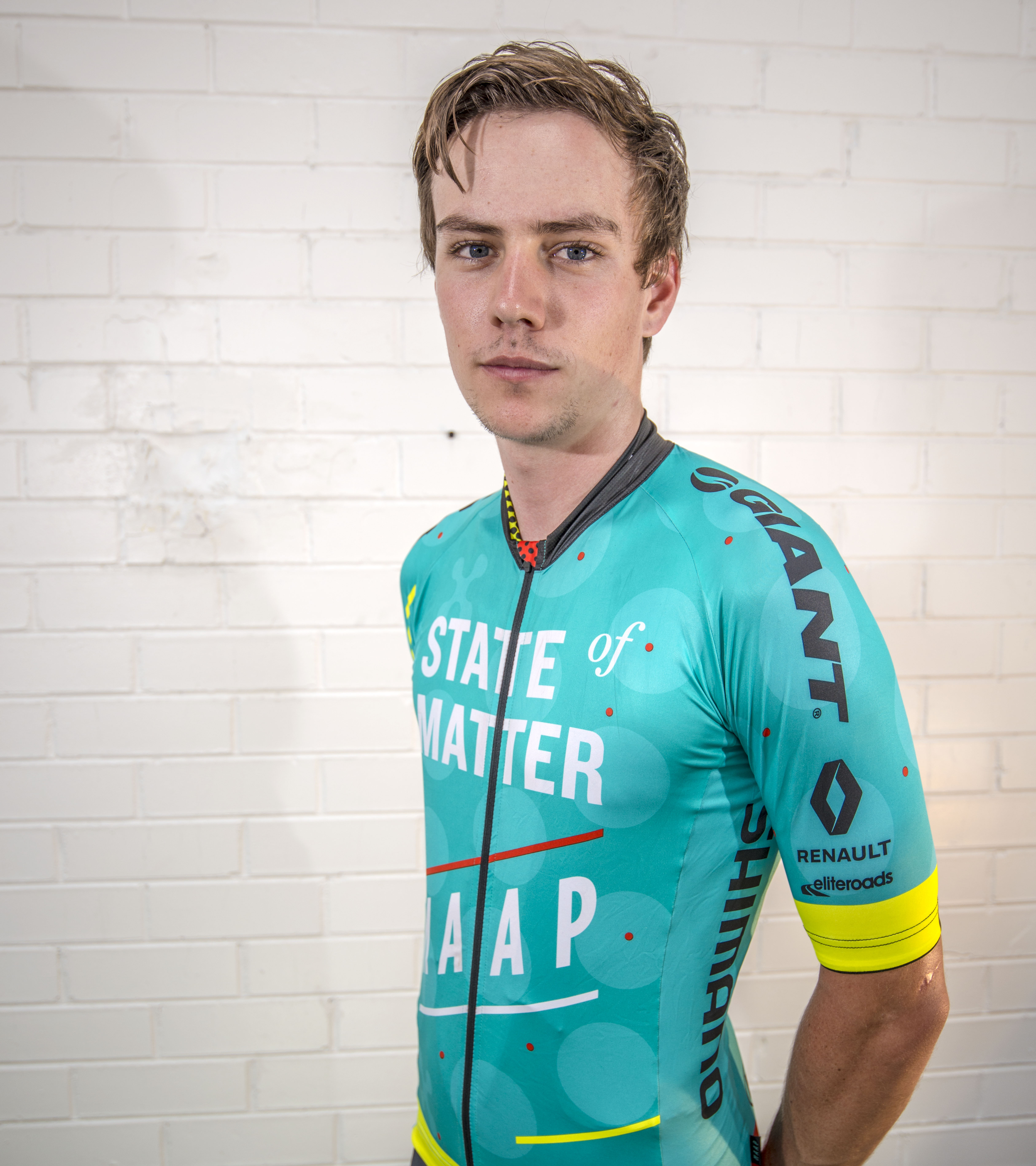
Luke Parker

Born in Melbourne, Australia, Luke Parker (born 21 October 1993) is an Australian cyclist currently living in Ormond, Victoria. Representing Australia. he previously competed at the 2011 UCI Junior World Track Championships in Moscow, Russia, where he and the team achieved 4th place in the Team Sprint event. In March 2012, he was the winner of Australia's most prestigious track cycling event, the Austral Wheel Race. In 2014 he was the winner of another prestigious track race, The Melbourne Cup on Wheels (MCOW) and became one of the few to win the Austral and MCOW double.

Parker currently rides with Attaque Team Gusto.

== Personal life ==
Parker attends Australian Catholic University (ACU) in Melbourne, Victoria and is studying for a Bachelor of Exercise and Sports Science.

== Cycling History ==
In 2006, Parker took up cycling and joined Carnegie Caulfield, his local cycling club. Shortly after, in 2007, he gained entry into The Australian Sports Commission's National Talent ID Program (NTID), designed to foster young talent in cycling.

In 2010, he was awarded a VIS scholarship.

== Major results ==
=== Best Overall Records ===
- Australian Record Holder, U19 Flying 200m in a time of 10.165 seconds - Moscow, Russia
- 2011 Australian Championship & All Comers Record, Team Sprint - 46.457 sec on 06.02.2011 - Sydney, NSW

Luke Parker, Jacob Schmid, Jaron Gardiner

==== 2009 ====
- Silver — U17 Victorian Junior Track Championships, Sprint
- Bronze — U17 Victorian Junior Track Championships, Time Trial
- Gold — U17 Australian National Track Championships, Team Sprint

(Luke Parker, Evan Hull, Jaron Gardiner)

==== 2010 ====
- Gold — U19 Australian National Track Championships, Team Sprint

(Luke Parker, Nathan Corrigan-Martella, Maddison Hammond)

==== 2011 ====
- Gold - U19 Australian National Track Championships, Team Sprint
- Bronze - U19 Australian National Track Championships, Sprint
- Bronze - U19 Australian National Track Championships, Keirin
- 4th - UCI Junior Track World Championships, Team Sprint

(Luke Parker, Timothy McMillan, Rick Sanders)

==== 2012 ====
- Winner, Austral Wheel Race

==== 2013 ====
- Winner - Stage 2, Le Tour de Filipinas

==== 2014 ====
- Winner - 78th Edition, 2014 Melbourne Cup on Wheels
