= Jesse Kerrison =

Australian bicycle racer

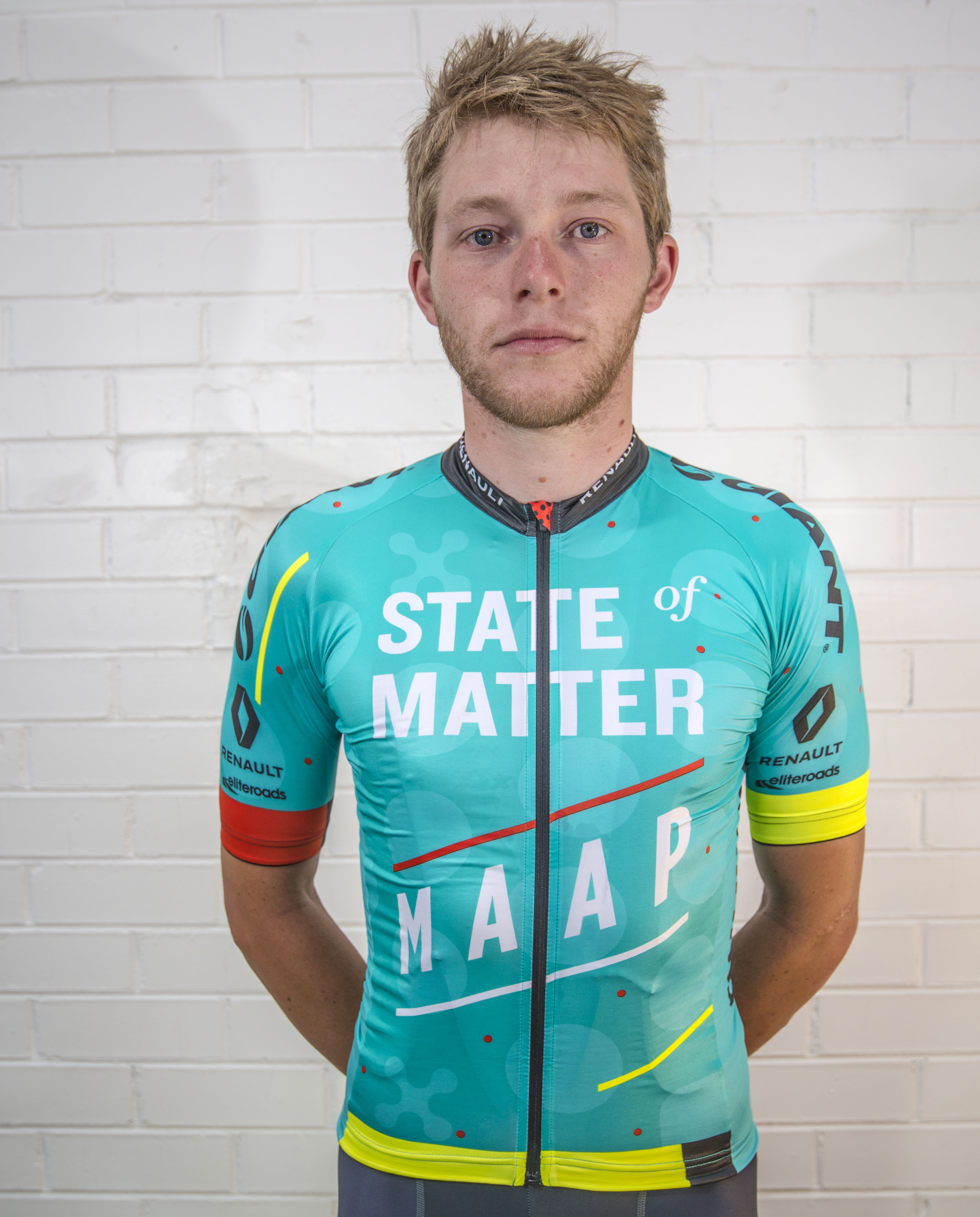

Personal information
- Full name: Jesse Kerrison
- Born: 3 April 1994 (age 32)

Cycling career
- Sport: Cycling
- Current team: Retired
- Discipline: Road
- Role: Rider

Amateur team
- 2015: BMC Development Team

Professional teams
- 2013–2014: Team Budget Forklifts
- 2016: State of Matter MAAP Racing
- 2017: IsoWhey Sports SwissWellness

Jesse Kerrison (born 3 April 1994) is an Australian former professional cyclist.

== Major results ==
2011
2nd Road race, National Junior Road Championships
2013
4th Overall Tour of Taihu Lake

1st Young rider classification
1st Stage 6

4th Tour of Nanjing
2014
1st Tour of Yancheng Coastal Wetlands
1st Stage 1 Tour of Taihu Lake
8th Road race, Oceania Under-23 Road Championships
2015
3rd Criterium, National Under-23 Road Championships
2016
1st Criterium, National Under-23 Road Championships
1st Stage 1 Tour de Kumano
