= State of Matter MAAP Racing =

Team information
- UCI code: CMR
- Registered: Australia
- Founded: 2015
- Disbanded: 2016
- Discipline: Road
- Status: UCI Continental

Key personnel
- General manager: Scott McGrory

Team name history
- 2015 2016: Charter Mason–Giant Racing Team; State of Matter MAAP Racing

State of Matter MAAP Racing was an Australian UCI Continental cycling team established in 2016, have previously been known as Charter Mason Giant Racing.

Team owners included Leigh Parsons, Damien Harris and Thomas Reynolds. The Team DS was Scott McGrory.

The team disbanded at the end of the 2016 season when a mooted merger was not completed.

== Team roster ==
As of January 25, 2016.

Rider	Date of birth
Adam Bull (NZL)	1 January 2016 (age 10)
Ryan Cavanagh (AUS)	22 November 1995 (age 30)
Jayden Copp (AUS)	3 September 1989 (age 37)
Michael Cuming (GBR)	18 December 1990 (age 35)
Daniel Fitter (AUS)	19 June 1996 (age 30)
Chris Harper (cyclist) (AUS)	23 November 1994 (age 31)
Naveen John (IND)	7 April 1986 (age 40)
Nicholas Katsonis (AUS)	2 October 1994 (age 31)
Jesse Kerrison (AUS)	3 April 1994 (age 32)

Rider	Date of birth
Conor Murtagh (AUS)	10 July 1993 (age 33)
Luke Parker (AUS)	21 October 1993 (age 32)
Thomas Robinson (AUS)	30 November 1989 (age 36)
Alexander Smyth (AUS)	10 December 1988 (age 37)
Dylan Sunderland (AUS)	26 February 1996 (age 30)
Harry Sweeny (AUS)	9 July 1998 (age 28)
Joshua Taylor (AUS)	27 July 1991 (age 35)
Paul Van Der Ploeg (AUS)	9 November 1989 (age 36)
Alex Wohler (AUS)	11 July 1992 (age 34)

== Major wins ==
2016
Australia National Criterium Championships, Jesse Kerrison
Stage 5 New Zealand Cycle Classic, Michael Cuming
Stage 1 Tour de Kumano, Jesse Kerrison
