= 2015 Tour Down Under =

Cycling race

2015 UCI World Tour, race 1 of 28

Race details
- Dates: 20–25 January 2015
- Stages: 6
- Distance: 812.3 km (504.7 mi)
- Winning time: 19h 15' 18"

Results
Jersey awarded to the overall winner	Winner	Rohan Dennis (AUS)	(BMC Racing Team)
	Second	Richie Porte (AUS)	(Team Sky)
	Third	Cadel Evans (AUS)	(BMC Racing Team)
Jersey awarded to the mountains classification winner	Mountains	Jack Bobridge (AUS)	(UniSA–Australia)
Jersey awarded to the young rider classification winner	Young rider	Rohan Dennis (AUS)	(BMC Racing Team)
Jersey awarded to the sprints classification winner	Sprints	Daryl Impey (RSA)	(Orica–GreenEDGE)
	Team	Movistar Team	

The 2015 Santos Tour Down Under was the 17th edition of the Tour Down Under stage race. It took place from 20 to 25 January in and around Adelaide, South Australia, and was the first race of the 2015 UCI World Tour. The overall winner was Australian rider Rohan Dennis of BMC Racing Team.

== Schedule ==
List of stages
Stage	Date	Course	Distance	Type	Winner
1	20 January	Tanunda to Campbelltown	132.6 km (82 mi)	Flat stage	Jack Bobridge (AUS)
2	21 January	Unley to Stirling	150.5 km (94 mi)	Flat stage	Juan José Lobato (ESP)
3	22 January	Norwood to Paracombe	143.2 km (89 mi)	Medium-mountain stage	Rohan Dennis (AUS)
4	23 January	Glenelg to Mount Barker	144.5 km (90 mi)	Flat stage	Steele Von Hoff (AUS)
5	24 January	McLaren Vale to Willunga Hill	151.5 km (94 mi)	Medium-mountain stage	Richie Porte (AUS)
6	25 January	Adelaide	90 km (56 mi)	Flat stage	Wouter Wippert (NED)

== Participating teams ==
As the Tour Down Under is a UCI World Tour event, all 17 UCI ProTeams were invited automatically and obligated to send a squad. Australian team Drapac Professional Cycling received a wildcard invitation and, together with a selection of Australian riders forming the UniSA–Australia squad, this formed the event's 19 team peloton.

Cadel Evans stated that it would be his last race in his professional career.

The 19 teams invited to the race are:

- AG2R La Mondiale
- Astana
- BMC Racing Team
- Drapac Professional Cycling
- Etixx–Quick-Step
- FDJ
- IAM Cycling
- Lampre–Merida
- Lotto–Soudal
- Movistar Team
- Orica–GreenEDGE
- Cannondale–Garmin
- Team Giant–Alpecin
- Team Katusha
- LottoNL–Jumbo
- Team Sky
- Tinkoff–Saxo
- Trek Factory Racing
- UniSA–Australia

== Stages ==
=== Stage 1 ===
20 January 2015 – Tanunda to Campbelltown, 132.6 km (82.4 mi)

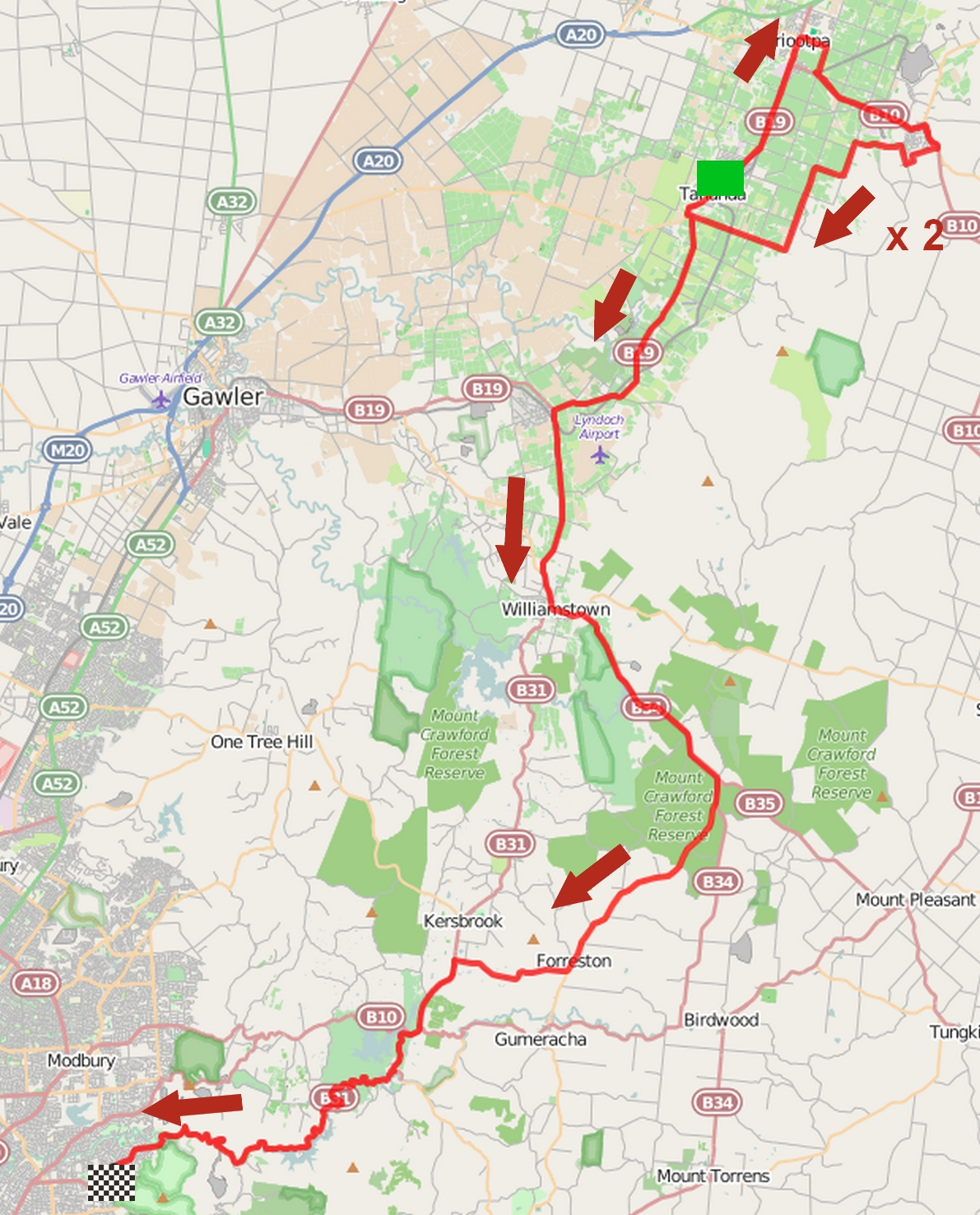
Stage 1

Stage 1 Result

	Rider	Team	Time
1	Jack Bobridge (AUS)	UniSA–Australia	2h 59' 44"
2	Lieuwe Westra (NED)	Astana	+ 0"
3	Luke Durbridge (AUS)	Orica–GreenEDGE	+ 0"
4	Maxim Belkov (RUS)	Team Katusha	+ 0"
5	Niccolò Bonifazio (ITA)	Lampre–Merida	+ 0"
6	Gianni Meersman (BEL)	Etixx–Quick-Step	+ 0"
7	Juan José Lobato (SPA)	Movistar Team	+ 0"
8	Heinrich Haussler (AUS)	IAM Cycling	+ 0"
9	Steele Von Hoff (AUS)	UniSA–Australia	+ 0"
10	Daryl Impey (RSA)	Orica–GreenEDGE	+ 0"

General Classification after Stage 1

	Rider	Team	Time
1	Jack Bobridge (AUS)	UniSA–Australia	2h 59' 31"
2	Lieuwe Westra (NED)	Astana	+ 4"
3	Luke Durbridge (AUS)	Orica–GreenEDGE	+ 6"
4	Maxim Belkov (RUS)	Team Katusha	+ 10"
5	Niccolò Bonifazio (ITA)	Lampre–Merida	+ 13"
6	Gianni Meersman (BEL)	Etixx–Quick-Step	+ 13"
7	Juan José Lobato (SPA)	Movistar Team	+ 13"
8	Heinrich Haussler (AUS)	IAM Cycling	+ 13"
9	Steele Von Hoff (AUS)	UniSA–Australia	+ 13"
10	Daryl Impey (RSA)	Orica–GreenEDGE	+ 13"

=== Stage 2 ===
21 January 2015 – Unley to Stirling, 150.5 km (93.5 mi)

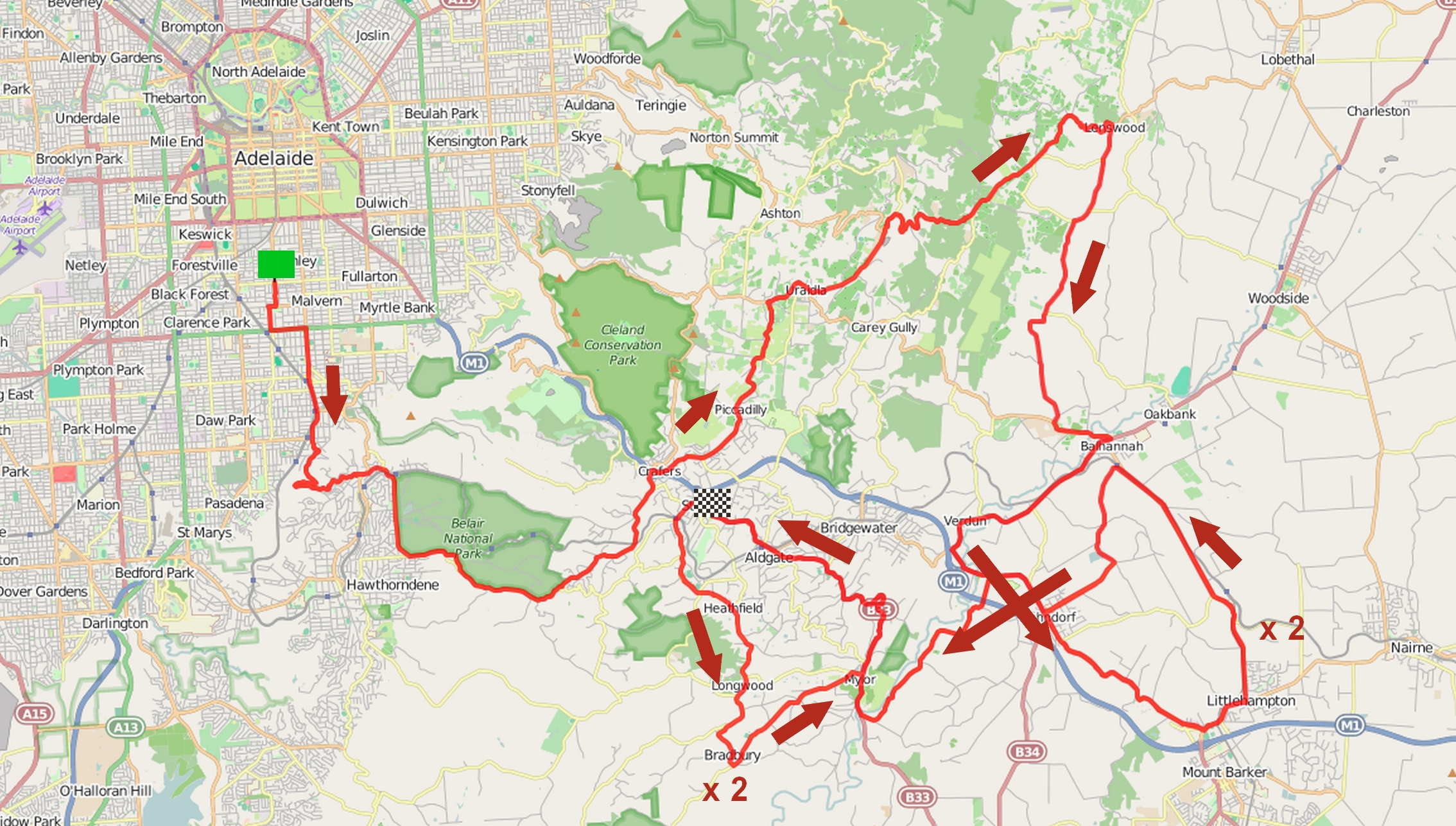
Stage 2

Stage 2 Result

	Rider	Team	Time
1	Juan José Lobato (SPA)	Movistar Team	3h 42' 24"
2	Daryl Impey (RSA)	Orica–GreenEDGE	+ 0"
3	Gorka Izagirre (ESP)	Movistar Team	+ 0"
4	Tom Dumoulin (NED)	Team Giant–Alpecin	+ 0"
5	Cadel Evans (AUS)	BMC Racing Team	+ 0"
6	Luis León Sánchez (ESP)	Astana	+ 0"
7	Richie Porte (AUS)	Team Sky	+ 0"
8	Niccolò Bonifazio (ITA)	Lampre–Merida	+ 0"
9	Nathan Haas (AUS)	Cannondale–Garmin	+ 0"
10	Samuel Dumoulin (FRA)	AG2R La Mondiale	+ 0"

General Classification after Stage 2

	Rider	Team	Time
1	Jack Bobridge (AUS)	UniSA–Australia	6h 41' 55"
2	Juan José Lobato (SPA)	Movistar Team	+ 3"
3	Lieuwe Westra (NED)	Astana	+ 4"
4	Daryl Impey (RSA)	Orica–GreenEDGE	+ 7"
5	Gorka Izagirre (ESP)	Movistar Team	+ 9"
6	Niccolò Bonifazio (ITA)	Lampre–Merida	+ 13"
7	Gianni Meersman (BEL)	Etixx–Quick-Step	+ 13"
8	Samuel Dumoulin (FRA)	AG2R La Mondiale	+ 13"
9	Nathan Haas (AUS)	Cannondale–Garmin	+ 13"
10	Cadel Evans (AUS)	BMC Racing Team	+ 13"

=== Stage 3 ===
22 January 2015 – Norwood to Paracombe, 143.2 km (89.0 mi)

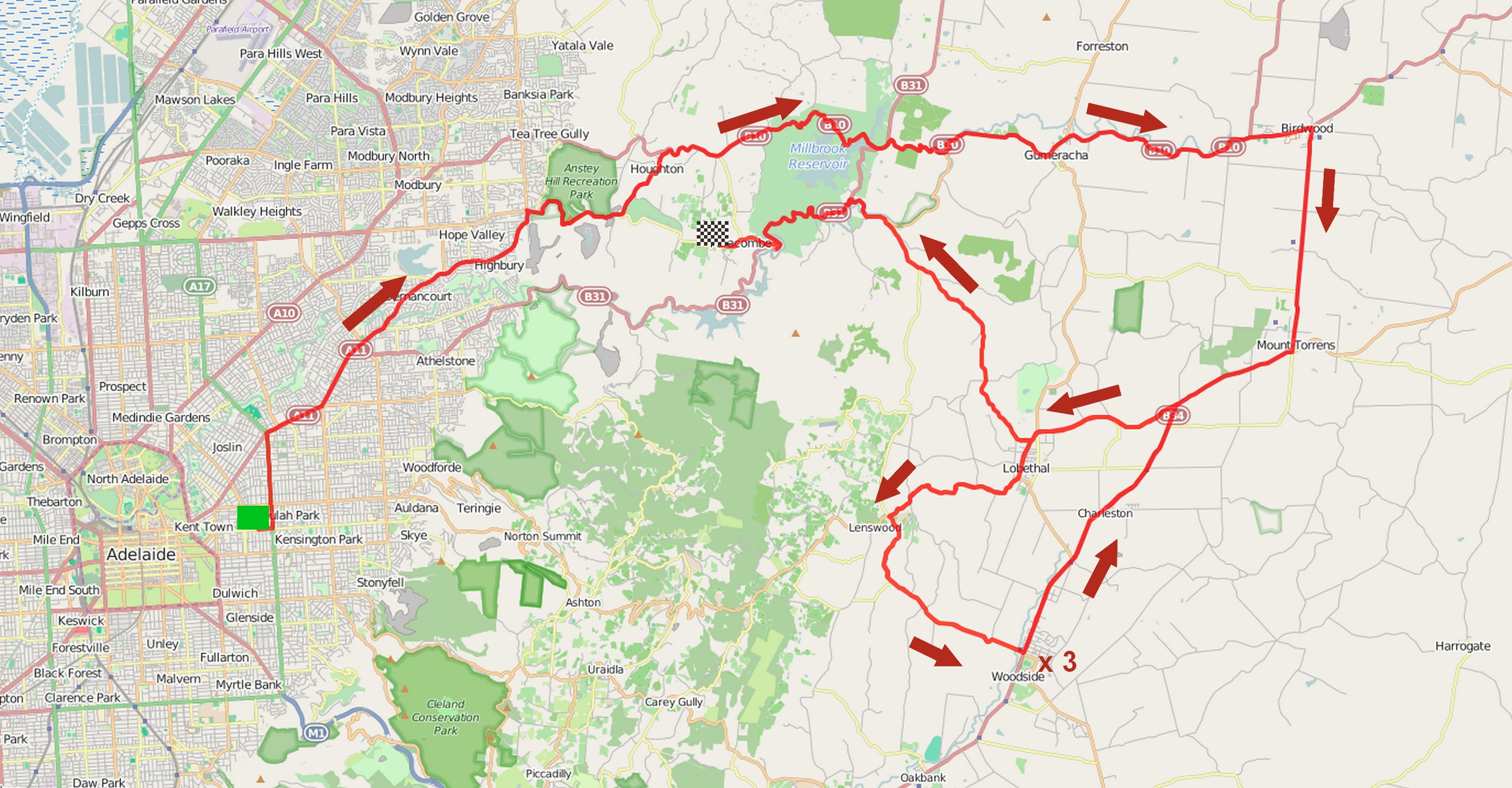
Stage 3

Stage 3 Result

	Rider	Team	Time
1	Rohan Dennis (AUS)	BMC Racing Team	3h 35' 08"
2	Cadel Evans (AUS)	BMC Racing Team	+ 3"
3	Tom Dumoulin (NED)	Team Giant–Alpecin	+ 3"
4	Maxime Bouet (FRA)	Etixx–Quick-Step	+ 5"
5	Michael Rogers (AUS)	Tinkoff–Saxo	+ 5"
6	Richie Porte (AUS)	Team Sky	+ 5"
7	Jack Haig (AUS)	UniSA–Australia	+ 5"
8	Rubén Fernández (ESP)	Movistar Team	+ 5"
9	Domenico Pozzovivo (ITA)	AG2R La Mondiale	+ 5"
10	Simon Geschke (GER)	Team Giant–Alpecin	+ 13"

General Classification after Stage 3

	Rider	Team	Time
1	Rohan Dennis (AUS)	BMC Racing Team	10h 17' 06"
2	Cadel Evans (AUS)	BMC Racing Team	+ 7"
3	Tom Dumoulin (NED)	Team Giant–Alpecin	+ 9"
4	Richie Porte (AUS)	Team Sky	+ 15"
5	Jack Haig (AUS)	UniSA–Australia	+ 15"
6	Rubén Fernández (ESP)	Movistar Team	+ 15"
7	Michael Rogers (AUS)	Tinkoff–Saxo	+ 15"
8	Maxime Bouet (FRA)	Etixx–Quick-Step	+ 15"
9	Domenico Pozzovivo (ITA)	AG2R La Mondiale	+ 15"
10	Daryl Impey (RSA)	Orica–GreenEDGE	+ 22"

=== Stage 4 ===
23 January 2015 – Glenelg to Mount Barker, 144.5 km (90 mi)

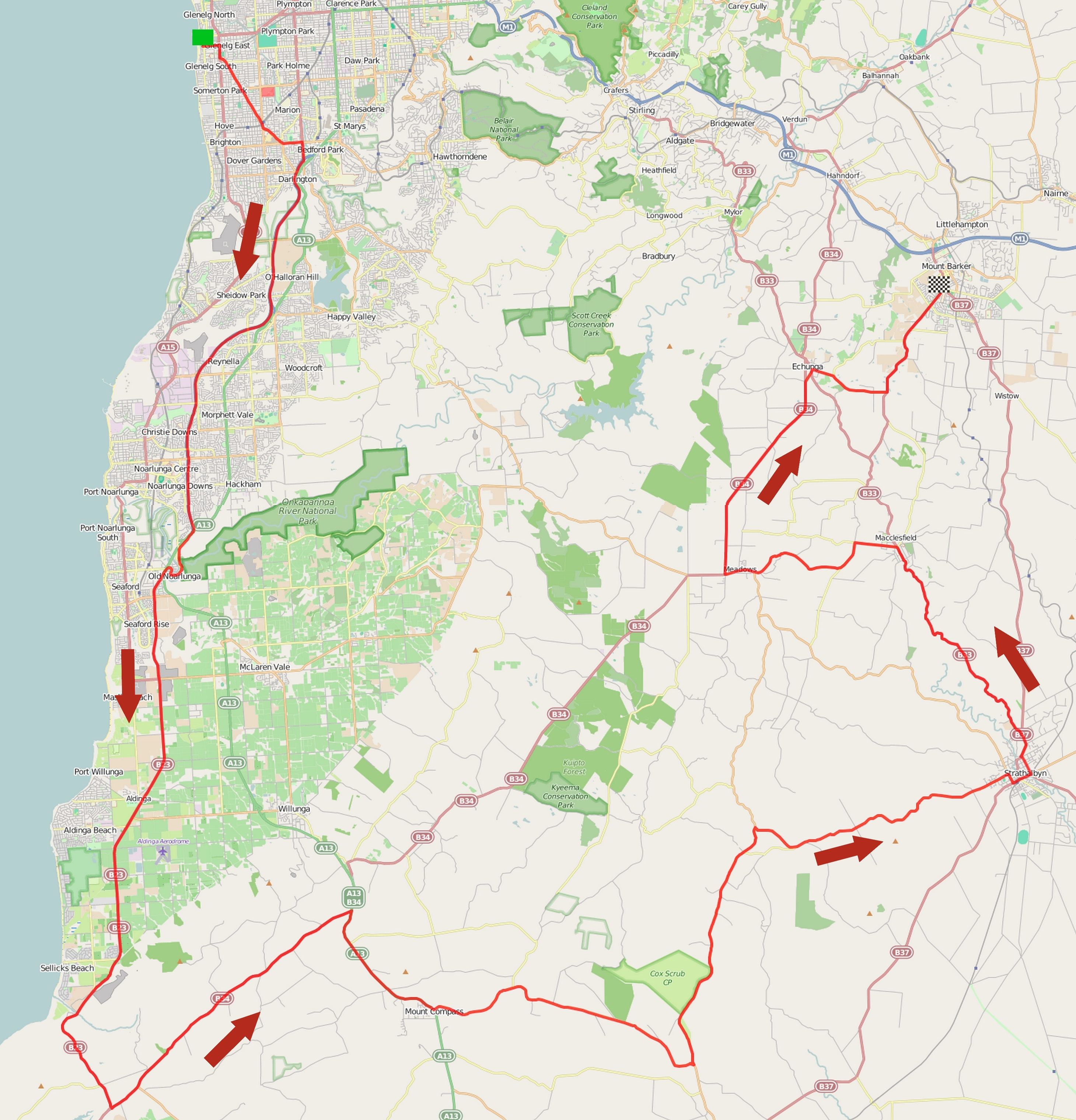
Stage 4

Stage 4 Result

	Rider	Team	Time
1	Steele Von Hoff (AUS)	UniSA–Australia	3h 24' 28"
2	Daryl Impey (RSA)	Orica–GreenEDGE	+ 0"
3	Wouter Wippert (NED)	Drapac Professional Cycling	+ 0"
4	Heinrich Haussler (AUS)	IAM Cycling	+ 0"
5	Samuel Dumoulin (FRA)	AG2R La Mondiale	+ 0"
6	Niccolò Bonifazio (ITA)	Lampre–Merida	+ 0"
7	Rüdiger Selig (GER)	Team Katusha	+ 0"
8	Gianni Meersman (BEL)	Etixx–Quick-Step	+ 0"
9	Eugenio Alafaci (ITA)	Trek Factory Racing	+ 0"
10	Koen de Kort (NED)	Team Giant–Alpecin	+ 0"

General Classification after Stage 4

	Rider	Team	Time
1	Rohan Dennis (AUS)	BMC Racing Team	13h 41' 34"
2	Cadel Evans (AUS)	BMC Racing Team	+ 7"
3	Tom Dumoulin (NED)	Team Giant–Alpecin	+ 9"
4	Daryl Impey (RSA)	Orica–GreenEDGE	+ 13"
5	Richie Porte (AUS)	Team Sky	+ 15"
6	Michael Rogers (AUS)	Tinkoff–Saxo	+ 15"
7	Jack Haig (AUS)	UniSA–Australia	+ 15"
8	Maxime Bouet (FRA)	Etixx–Quick-Step	+ 15"
9	Rubén Fernández (ESP)	Movistar Team	+ 15"
10	Domenico Pozzovivo (ITA)	AG2R La Mondiale	+ 15"

=== Stage 5 ===
24 January 2015 – McLaren Vale to Willunga Hill, 151.5 km (94 mi)

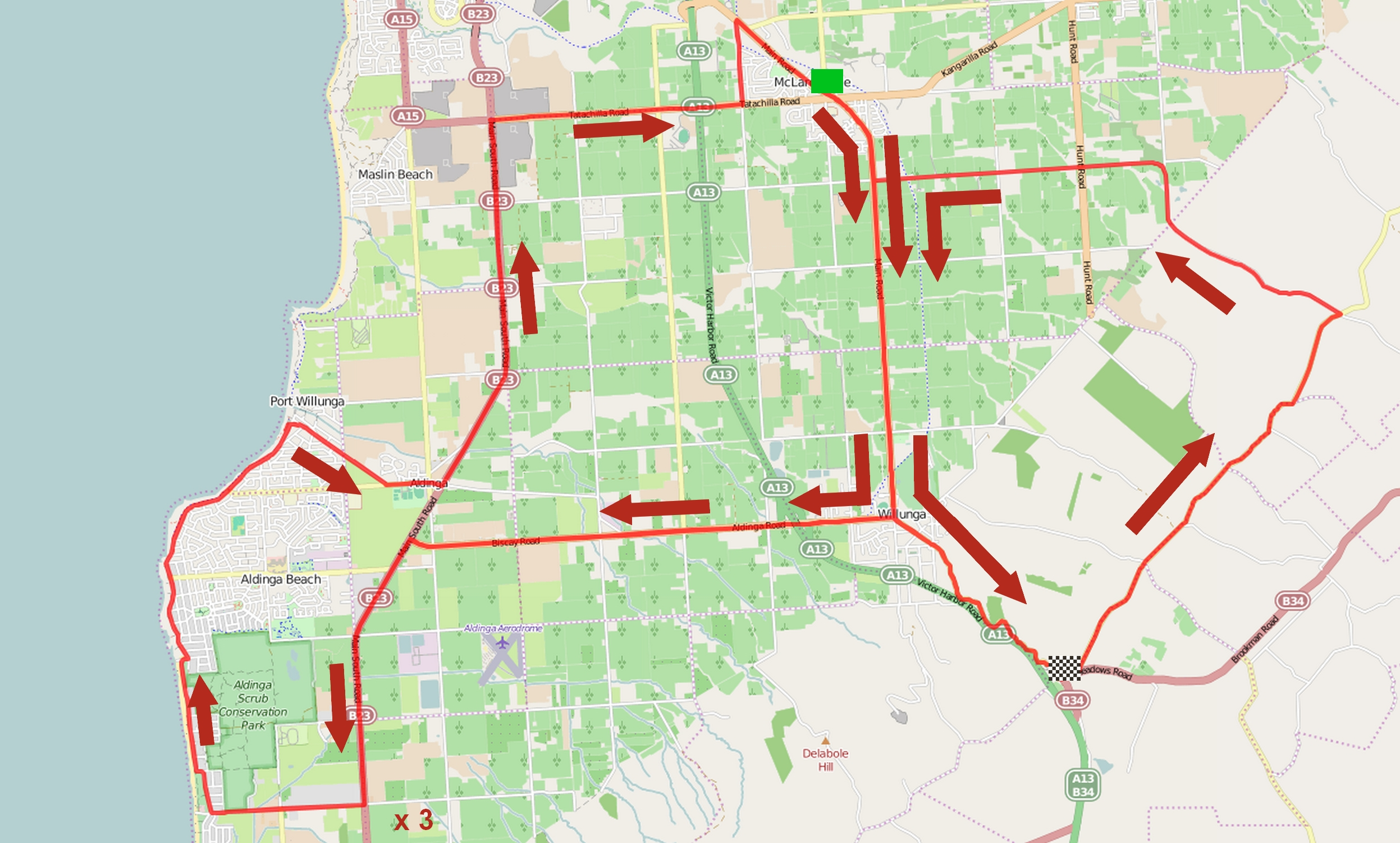
Stage 5

Stage 5 Result

	Rider	Team	Time
1	Richie Porte (AUS)	Team Sky	3h 37' 32"
2	Rohan Dennis (AUS)	BMC Racing Team	+ 9"
3	Rubén Fernández (ESP)	Movistar Team	+ 16"
4	Cadel Evans (AUS)	BMC Racing Team	+ 16"
5	Tom Dumoulin (NED)	Team Giant–Alpecin	+ 16"
6	Domenico Pozzovivo (ITA)	AG2R La Mondiale	+ 19"
7	Tiago Machado (POR)	Team Katusha	+ 24"
8	Moreno Moser (ITA)	Cannondale–Garmin	+ 26"
9	Gorka Izagirre (ESP)	Movistar Team	+ 28"
10	Arnold Jeannesson (FRA)	FDJ	+ 28"

General Classification after Stage 5

	Rider	Team	Time
1	Rohan Dennis (AUS)	BMC Racing Team	17h 19' 09"
2	Richie Porte (AUS)	Team Sky	+ 2"
3	Cadel Evans (AUS)	BMC Racing Team	+ 20"
4	Tom Dumoulin (NED)	Team Giant–Alpecin	+ 22"
5	Rubén Fernández (ESP)	Movistar Team	+ 24"
6	Domenico Pozzovivo (ITA)	AG2R La Mondiale	+ 31"
7	Daryl Impey (RSA)	Orica–GreenEDGE	+ 38"
8	Tiago Machado (POR)	Team Katusha	+ 46"
9	Gorka Izagirre (ESP)	Movistar Team	+ 52"
10	Jarlinson Pantano (COL)	IAM Cycling	+ 53"

=== Stage 6 ===
25 January 2015 – Adelaide, 90 km (56 mi)

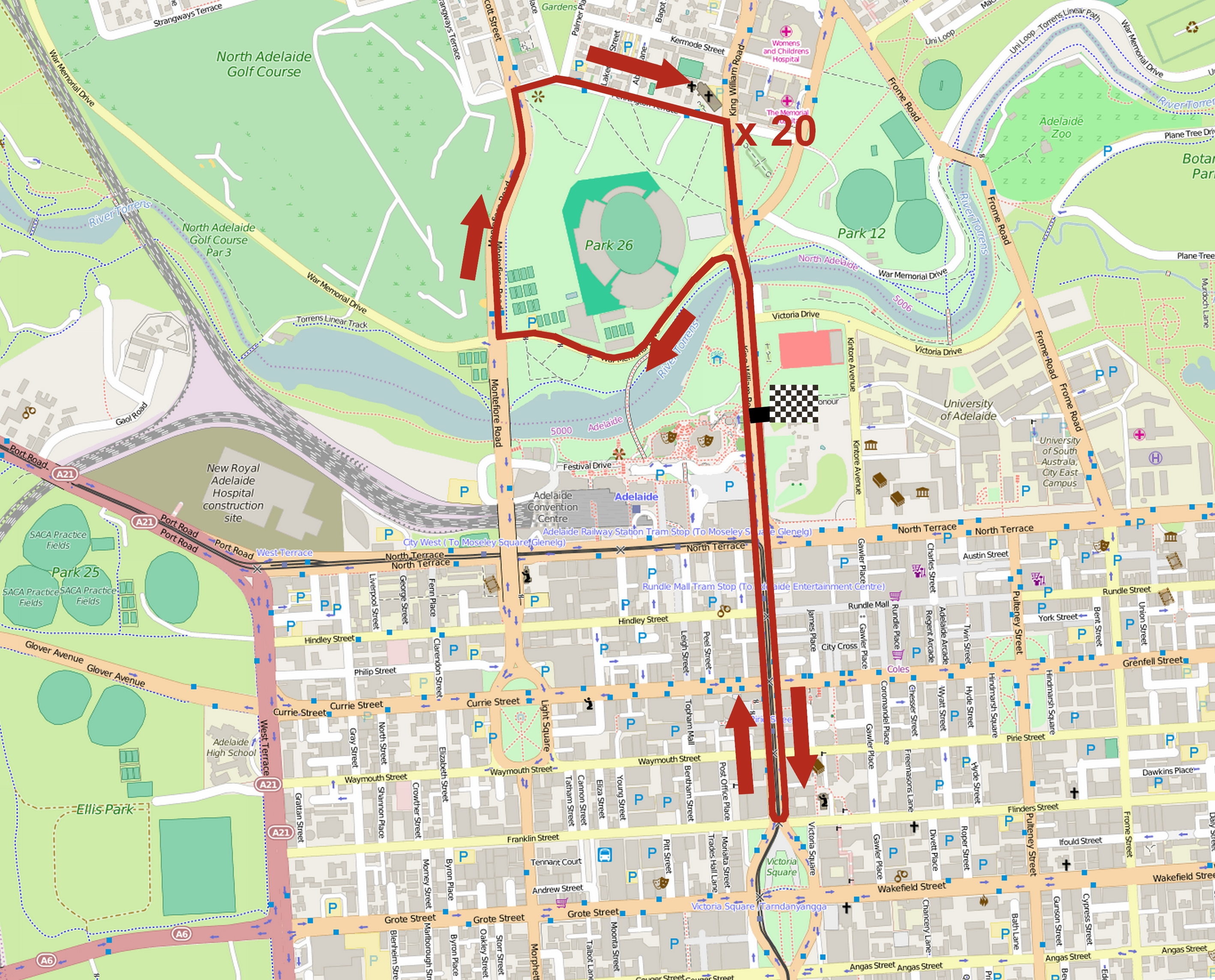
Stage 6

Stage 6 Result

	Rider	Team	Time
1	Wouter Wippert (NED)	Drapac Professional Cycling	1h 56' 09"
2	Heinrich Haussler (AUS)	IAM Cycling	+ 0"
3	Boris Vallée (BEL)	Lotto–Soudal	+ 0"
4	Pavel Brutt (RUS)	Tinkoff–Saxo	+ 0"
5	Daryl Impey (RSA)	Orica–GreenEDGE	+ 0"
6	Niccolò Bonifazio (ITA)	Lampre–Merida	+ 0"
7	Steele Von Hoff (AUS)	UniSA–Australia	+ 0"
8	Ruslan Tleubayev (KAZ)	Astana	+ 0"
9	Rüdiger Selig (GER)	Team Katusha	+ 0"
10	Sébastien Chavanel (FRA)	FDJ	+ 0"

Final General Classification

	Rider	Team	Time
1	Rohan Dennis (AUS)	BMC Racing Team	19h 15' 18"
2	Richie Porte (AUS)	Team Sky	+ 2"
3	Cadel Evans (AUS)	BMC Racing Team	+ 20"
4	Tom Dumoulin (NED)	Team Giant–Alpecin	+ 22"
5	Rubén Fernández (ESP)	Movistar Team	+ 24"
6	Domenico Pozzovivo (ITA)	AG2R La Mondiale	+ 31"
7	Daryl Impey (RSA)	Orica–GreenEDGE	+ 35"
8	Gorka Izagirre (ESP)	Movistar Team	+ 52"
9	Jarlinson Pantano (COL)	IAM Cycling	+ 53"
10	George Bennett (NZL)	LottoNL–Jumbo	+ 57"

== Classification leadership table ==
Stage	Winner	General classification	Mountains classification	Sprint classification	Young rider classification	Most competitive rider	Team classification
1	Jack Bobridge	Jack Bobridge	Jack Bobridge	Jack Bobridge	Luke Durbridge	Luke Durbridge	UniSA–Australia
2	Juan José Lobato	Jack Bobridge	Jack Bobridge	Juan José Lobato	Niccolò Bonifazio	Thomas De Gendt	Movistar Team
3	Rohan Dennis	Rohan Dennis	Rohan Dennis	Cadel Evans	Rohan Dennis	Will Clarke	BMC Racing Team
4	Steele Von Hoff	Rohan Dennis	Jack Bobridge	Daryl Impey	Rohan Dennis	Cédric Pineau	BMC Racing Team
5	Richie Porte	Rohan Dennis	Jack Bobridge	Daryl Impey	Rohan Dennis	Greg Henderson	Movistar Team
6	Wouter Wippert	Rohan Dennis	Jack Bobridge	Daryl Impey	Rohan Dennis	Manuele Boaro	Movistar Team
Final		Rohan Dennis	Jack Bobridge	Daryl Impey	Rohan Dennis	No final award	Movistar Team
