= Tour of Yancheng Coastal Wetlands =

Chinese one-day road cycling race

Race details
- Date: November
- Region: China
- Discipline: Road
- Competition: UCI Asia Tour
- Type: One-day race

History
- First edition: 2014
- Editions: 3
- Final edition: 2016
- First winner: Jesse Kerrison (AUS)
- Most wins: No repeat winners
- Final winner: Jakub Mareczko (ITA)

Tour of Yancheng Coastal Wetlands was a men's one-day road cycle race in China. The first edition was a one-day race and was rated by the UCI as a 1.2 event as part of the UCI Asia Tour. The 2015 edition included two stages and was rated as a 2.2 event. The race returned to one-day format in 2016 and has not been held since.

== Overall winners ==
Year	Winner	Team
2014	(Australia) Jesse Kerrison	Team Budget Forklifts
2015	(Lithuania) Evaldas Šiškevičius	Team Marseille 13 KTM
2016	(Italy) Jakub Mareczko	Wilier Triestina–Southeast
