= Laurie Venn =

Australian cyclist

Personal information
- Full name: Laurie Venn
- Born: 24 August 1953 (age 73) Melbourne, Australia

Cycling career
- Sport: Cycling
- Role: Rider

Laurie Venn (born 24 August 1953) is a former Australian racing cyclist. He won the Australian national road race title in 1985.
