= Team Budget Forklifts =

Australian cycling team

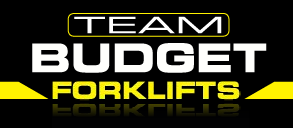

Team information
- UCI code: BFL
- Registered: Australia
- Founded: 2008
- Disbanded: 2015
- Discipline: Road
- Status: UCI Continental
- Bicycles: Cervélo
- Website: Team home page

Key personnel
- General manager: Tim Leunig

Team name history
- 2008 2009–2015: Ord Minnett-Triple Play; Team Budget Forklifts

Team Budget Forklifts was an Australian UCI Continental cycling team established in 2008. The team disbanded in 2015.

For the 2015 season the team was able to sign World Hour record holder Jack Bobridge

== Major wins ==
2009
Stage 8 Tour of Wellington, Jack Anderson
Oceania Time Trial Championships, Jack Anderson
Stage 1 Tour de Singkarak, Malcolm Rudolph
2013
New Zealand National Time Trial Championships, Michael Vink
Memorial Van Coningsloo, Michael Vink
Stage 2 Tour de Singkarak, Jacob Kauffman
Stage 6 Tour of Taihu Lake, Jesse Kerrison
2014
Overall New Zealand Cycle Classic, Michael Vink

Prologue, Michael Vink

Overall Tour de Hokkaido, Joshua Prete
Overall Tour of Taihu Lake, Sam Witmitz

Stage 1, Jesse Kerrison
Stages 3, 6 & 7, Sam Witmitz

Tour of Yancheng Coastal Wetlands, Jesse Kerrison
2015
Stage 4 New Zealand Cycle Classic, Joshua Prete
Stage 3a (ITT) Tour de Beauce, Brendan Canty

== National and continental champions ==
2009
Oceania Time Trial Championships, Jack Anderson
2013
New Zealand National Time Trial Championships, Michael Vink

== 2014 roster ==
As at 31 December 2014

Rider	Date of birth
Daniel Barry (NZL)	29 January 1988 (aged 26)
Michael Cupitt (AUS)	20 March 1982 (aged 32)
Karl Evans (AUS)	28 June 1986 (aged 28)
Westley Gough (NZL)	4 May 1988 (aged 26)
Sam Horgan (NZL)	4 May 1988 (aged 26)
Kristian Juel (AUS)	5 May 1992 (aged 22)
Jesse Kerrison (AUS)	3 April 1994 (aged 20)
Peter Loft (AUS)	5 November 1991 (aged 23)
Tommy Nankervis (AUS)	21 January 1983 (aged 31)

Rider	Date of birth
Joshua Prete (AUS)	17 August 1991 (aged 23)
Myron Simpson (NZL)	30 July 1990 (aged 24)
Talbot Brodie (AUS)	13 February 1989 (aged 25)
Michael Vink (NZL)	22 November 1991 (aged 23)
Marc Williams (AUS)	10 May 1984 (aged 30)
Blair Windsor (AUS)	29 May 1989 (aged 25)
Sam Witmitz (AUS)	17 March 1985 (aged 29)
Alex Wohler (AUS)	11 July 1992 (aged 22)
