= Jack Anderson (cyclist) =

Australian bicycle racer (born 1987)

Personal information
- Full name: Jack Anderson
- Born: 2 June 1987 (age 39) Brisbane, Australia

Cycling career
- Sport: Cycling
- Discipline: Road
- Role: Rider

Amateur team
- 2017–2018: Intervelo p/b Crocosaurus Cove

Professional teams
- 2008–2009: Ord Minnett–Triple Play
- 2010: Sprocket
- 2011–2012: Endura Racing
- 2013: Team Budget Forklifts
- 2014: Drapac Professional Cycling
- 2015: Team Budget Forklifts

Jack Anderson (born 2 June 1987 in Brisbane) is an Australian cyclist.

== Major results ==
2009
1st Time trial, Oceania Under-23 Road Championships
1st Stage 1 (TTT) Tour of Wellington
1st Stage 1 (TTT) Tour de Singkarak
2010
2nd Time trial, National Road Championships
3rd Ronde Pévéloise
6th Overall Mi-Août en Bretagne
9th Duo Normand (with Fredrik Johansson)
2011
1st Stage 1 (TTT) Czech Cycling Tour
2013
Oceania Road Championships

3rd Road race
7th Time trial

7th Overall Tour de Hokkaido
2014
1st Points classification Herald Sun Tour
Oceania Road Championships

6th Road race
10th Time trial

2015
7th The REV Classic
10th Overall New Zealand Cycle Classic
