= Dylan Girdlestone =

South African cyclist

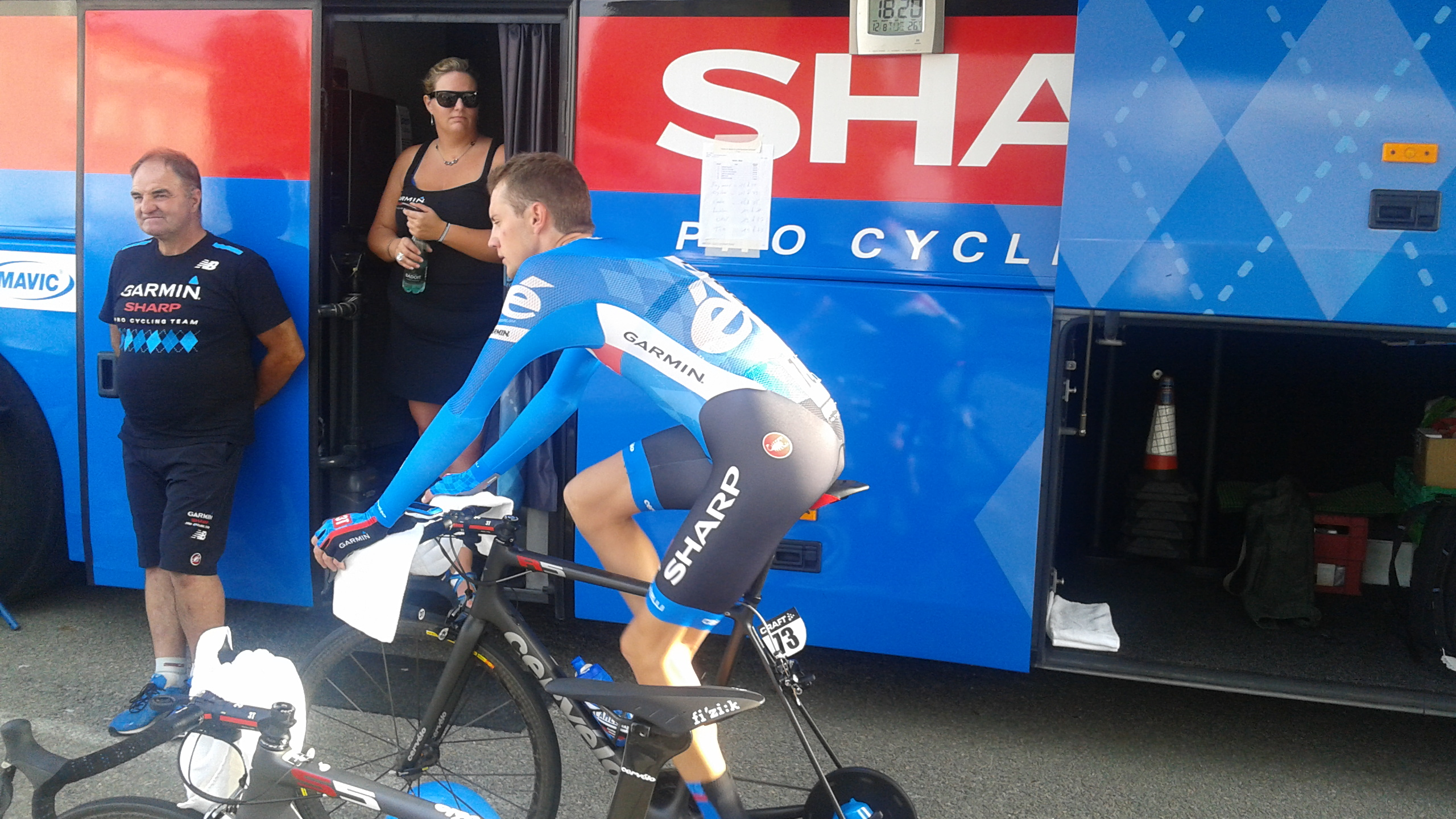
- Dylan Girdlestone in 2014

Personal information
- Born: 11 October 1989 (age 37) East London, Eastern Cape, South Africa

Cycling career
- Sport: Cycling
- Discipline: Road
- Role: Rider

Professional teams
- 2010–2011: MTN–Energade
- 2014: Garmin–Sharp (stagiaire)
- 2015: Drapac Professional Cycling

Dylan Girdlestone (born 11 October 1989) is a South African professional racing cyclist.
