= Brad Evans (cyclist) =

New Zealand bicycle racer

Personal information
- Full name: Brad Evans
- Born: 8 May 1992 (age 34) Otago, New Zealand

Cycling career
- Sport: Cycling
- Discipline: Road
- Role: Rider
- Rider type: Sprinter

Amateur teams
- 2013–2015: Powernet
- 2015: Drapac Professional Cycling (stagiaire)

Professional teams
- 2016–2017: Drapac Professional Cycling
- 2018: Mobius–BridgeLane

Brad Evans (born 8 May 1992) is a New Zealand cyclist, who last rode for UCI Continental team Mobius–BridgeLane.

In 2015 Evans won the Tour of Southland by a very convincing lead of 1 minute 11 seconds. Evans signed with the Mobius–BridgeLane squad for the 2018 season.

== Major results ==
2015
1st Overall Tour of Southland
2016
1st Stage 7 Tour de Korea
1st Stage 2 New Zealand Cycle Classic
5th The REV Classic
2017
1st Le Race
4th Road race, National Road Championships
