= Benjamin Johnson (cyclist) =

Australian cyclist

Ben Johnson
Personal information
- Full name: Benjamin Johnson
- Born: 7 January 1983 (age 43)

Cycling career
- Sport: Cycling
- Current team: Rider
- Discipline: Road
- Role: Rider

Amateur teams
- 2003–2004: SCO Dijon
- 2003: Cofidis (stagiaire)

Professional teams
- 2005–2006: Agritubel–Loudun
- 2007: Slipstream–Chipotle
- 2008: FRF Couriers–NSWIS
- 2014: Drapac Professional Cycling

Benjamin "Ben" Johnson (born 7 January 1983 in Noosa) is an Australian former professional cyclist.

== Major results ==
2006
8th Omloop van het Houtland
