= Cameron Peterson =

Australian cyclist (born 1983)

Personal information
- Born: 4 December 1983 (age 42)

Cycling career
- Sport: Cycling
- Role: Rider

Professional team
- 2015: Drapac Professional Cycling

Cameron Peterson (born 4 December 1983) is an Australian professional racing cyclist who rides for Drapac.
