= Samuel Spokes =

Australian cyclist

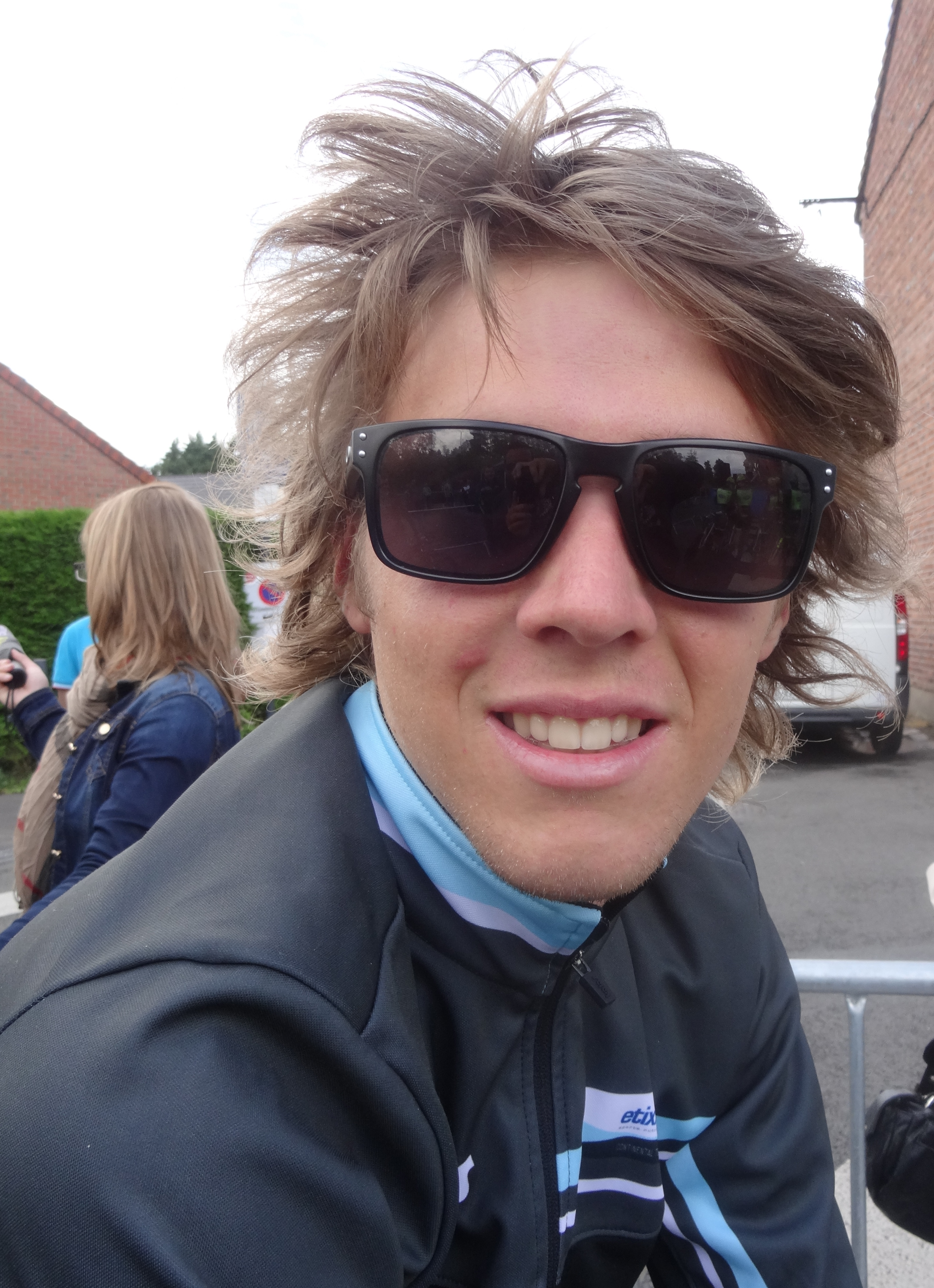
- Spokes in 2014

Personal information
- Born: 16 April 1992 (age 34) Tamworth, New South Wales, Australia
- Height: 178 cm (5 ft 10 in)
- Weight: 63 kg (139 lb)

Cycling career
- Sport: Cycling
- Current team: Retired
- Discipline: Road
- Role: Rider
- Rider type: Puncheur

Amateur team
- 2013–2014: Etixx–IHNed

Professional team
- 2015–2016: Drapac Professional Cycling

Samuel Spokes (born 16 April 1992) is an Australian former racing cyclist. He rode at the 2013 UCI Road World Championships.

== Major results ==
2010
1st Overall Liège–La Gleize
2nd Trofeo San Rocco
2011
1st Stage 3 (TTT) Tour d'Eure-et-Loir
2012
1st Overall Tour d'Eure-et-Loir

1st Stages 1 & 3 (TTT)

6th Liège–Bastogne–Liège U23
2013
1st Overall Tour de Vysočina

1st Stage 1

9th Grand Prix Kralovehradeckeho kraje
2014
1st Overall Peace Race U23

1st Points classification
1st Stages 2 & 3

6th Liège–Bastogne–Liège U23
2015
5th Road race, National Road Championships
