= Malcolm Rudolph =

Australian cyclist

Personal information
- Full name: Malcolm Rudolph
- Born: 4 January 1989 (age 37) Maryborough, Queensland, Australia

Cycling career
- Sport: Cycling
- Current team: Retired
- Discipline: Road
- Role: Rider

Professional teams
- 2008–2009: Team Budget Forklifts
- 2010–2011: Team Jayco–Skins
- 2012–2015: Drapac Cycling

Malcolm Rudolph (born 4 January 1989) is an Australian former professional racing cyclist. He now works as a teacher at Corinda State High school.

== Major results ==
2009
1st Stage 1 (TTT) Tour de Singkarak
5th Road race, Oceania Road Championships
2010
2nd Road race, National Under-23 Road Championships
2011
6th Road race, Oceania Road Championships
2015
7th Road race, Oceania Road Championships
