= Wouter Wippert =

Dutch road bicycle racer

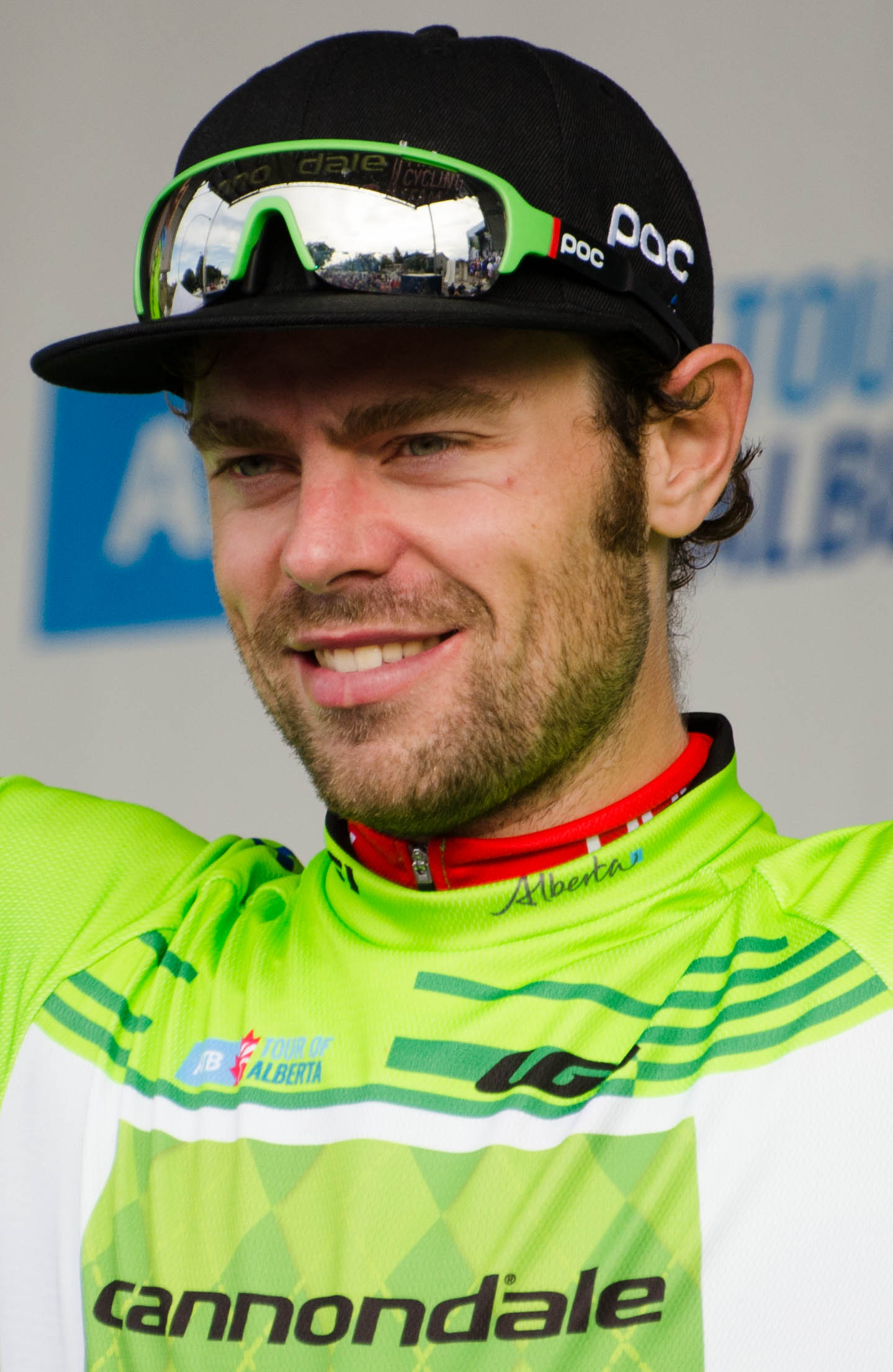
- Wippert at the 2017 Tour of Alberta

Personal information
- Full name: Wouter Wippert
- Born: 14 August 1990 (age 36) Wierden, Netherlands
- Height: 1.78 m (5 ft 10 in)
- Weight: 75 kg (165 lb)

Cycling career
- Sport: Cycling
- Current team: Retired
- Discipline: Road
- Role: Rider
- Rider type: Sprinter

Amateur team
- 2009–2012: Davo–Lotto–Davitamon

Professional teams
- 2012: Lotto–Belisol (stagiaire)
- 2013: Team3M
- 2014–2015: Drapac Professional Cycling
- 2016–2017: Cannondale
- 2018: Roompot–Nederlandse Loterij
- 2019–2020: EvoPro Racing
Medal record
Representing Netherlands
Men's road bicycle racing
European Championships
Bronze medal – third place	2012 Goes	Under-23 road race

Wouter Wippert (born 14 August 1990) is a Dutch former professional road racing cyclist, who competed professionally from 2013 to 2020. In 2015, Wippert took a stage win in the UCI World Tour race Tour Down Under.

== Career ==
In the 2015 Tour of California, he was on the podium three times in presence of Mark Cavendish and Peter Sagan among other fast finishers. He also won a pair of stages in that year's Tour de Taiwan and the Tour de Korea.

== Major results ==
2010
1st Stage 8 Okolo Slovenska
2011
1st Stage 2 Tour de Berlin
1st Stage 3 Tour de l'Avenir
6th Beverbeek Classic
7th Road race, UCI Under-23 Road World Championships
7th Dorpenomloop Rucphen
7th Grote Prijs Stad Geel
10th Internationale Wielertrofee Jong Maar Moedig
2012
1st Stage 5 Le Triptyque des Monts et Châteaux
3rd Road race, UEC European Under-23 Road Championships
3rd Grote Prijs Stad Zottegem
5th La Côte Picarde
5th ZLM Tour
6th Ronde van Drenthe
9th Road race, UCI Under-23 Road World Championships
2013
2nd Ronde van Noord-Holland
4th Halle–Ingooigem
4th Dutch Food Valley Classic
6th Grote 1-MeiPrijs
7th Zuid Oost Drenthe Classic I
7th Dorpenomloop Rucphen
9th Arno Wallaard Memorial
2014
Tour de Kumano

1st Points classification
1st Stages 1 & 3

New Zealand Cycle Classic

1st Stages 2 & 4

1st Stage 3 Tour de Taiwan
1st Stage 2 Tour of Japan
1st Stage 9 Tour of Hainan
5th Overall Tour of China II

1st Stage 4

2015
Tour de Taiwan

1st Stages 1 & 3

Tour de Korea

1st Stages 1 & 6

1st Stage 6 Tour Down Under
3rd Down Under Classic
2016
Czech Cycling Tour

1st Points classification
1st Stage 1 (TTT)

2nd Road race, National Road Championships
2nd Heistse Pijl
8th Scheldeprijs
2017
Tour of Alberta

1st Points classification
1st Stages 2 & 4

2nd Road race, National Road Championships
2nd Arnhem–Veenendaal Classic
5th London–Surrey Classic
2018
1st Omloop Mandel-Leie-Schelde
2nd Heistse Pijl
2nd Arnhem–Veenendaal Classic
4th Dorpenomloop Rucphen
2019
Belgrade Banjaluka

1st Stages 2 & 3

1st Stage 5 Tour de Hongrie
4th Overall Boucles de la Mayenne
