= Lachlan Norris =

Australian cyclist (born 1987)

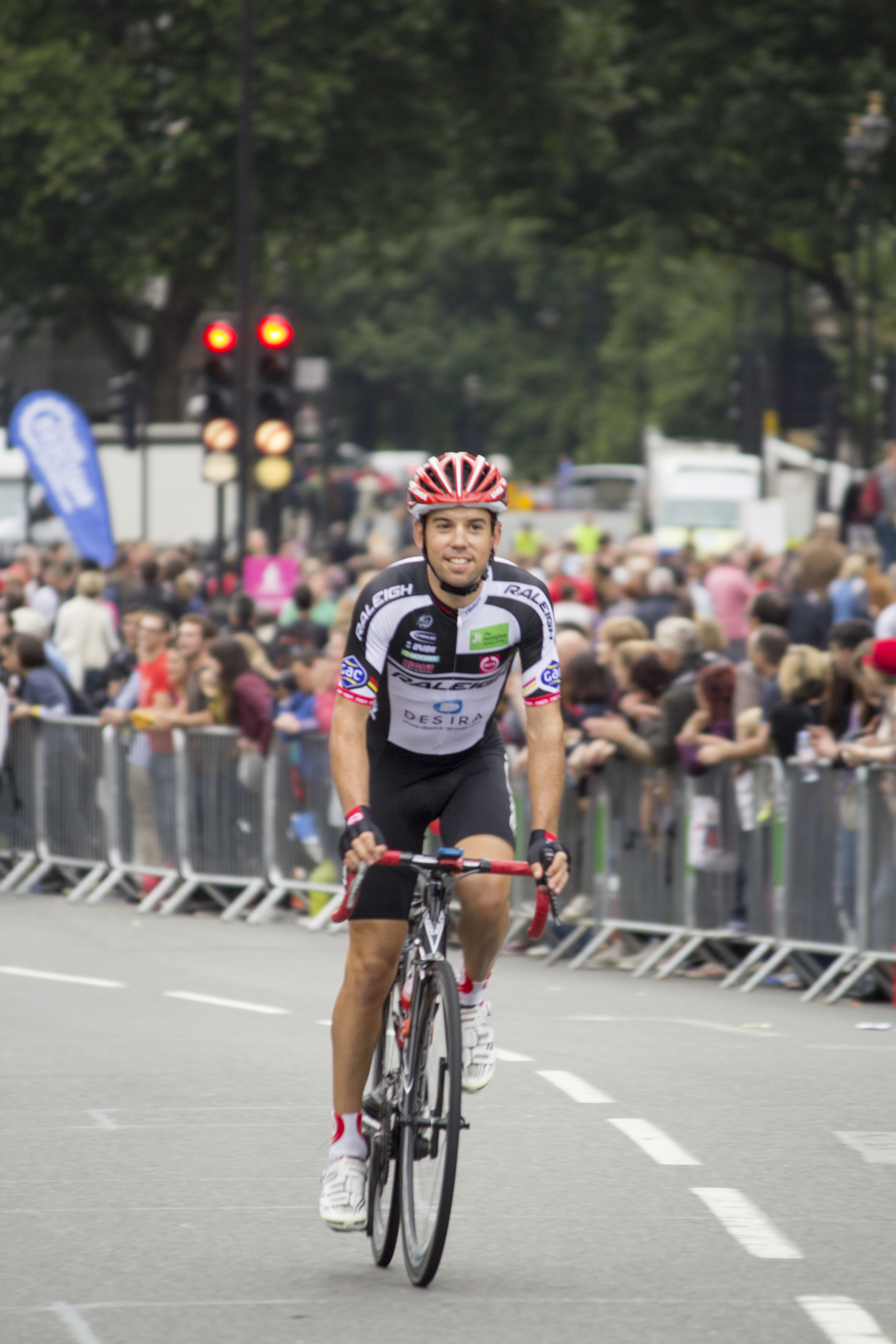
- Norris in 2013

Personal information
- Full name: Lachlan Norris
- Born: 21 January 1987 (age 39) Kalgoorlie, Western Australia, Australia
- Height: 1.77 m (5 ft 10 in)
- Weight: 67 kg (148 lb)

Cycling career
- Sport: Cycling
- Current team: Retired
- Disciplines: Road, Mountain Bike XC
- Role: Rider

Professional teams
- 2009: Team Jayco
- 2010–2012: Drapac–Porsche Cycling
- 2013: Team Raleigh
- 2014–2016: Drapac Professional Cycling
- 2017–2018: UnitedHealthcare

Lachlan Norris (born 21 January 1987) is an Australian former professional racing cyclist, who rode professionally between 2009 and 2018 for the Team Jayco, Team Raleigh, Drapac Professional Cycling (two spells) and UnitedHealthcare teams.

Prior to his career on the road, Norris represented Australia at 8 World Mountain Bike Championships from 2004 to 2011.

== Major results ==
2005
1st Australian Mountain Bike Championships, Junior XC
2006
3rd Australian Mountain Bike Championships, U23 XC
2007
2nd Australian Mountain Bike Championships, U23 XC
2009
1st Australian Mountain Bike Championships, U23 XC
2010
2nd Overall Tour of Wellington
2011
4th Overall Tour de Taiwan
9th Overall Tour of Wellington
2012
1st Overall Tour of Tasmania
2013
1st Mountains classification Circuit des Ardennes
2014
3rd Time trial, Oceania Road Championships
4th Overall Tour de Korea
6th Overall Tour de Kumano
10th Overall Tour of Utah
2015
6th Overall USA Pro Cycling Challenge
6th Overall Tour of Utah

1st Stage 7

8th Overall Herald Sun Tour
9th Time trial, Oceania Road Championships
2016
5th Road race, Oceania Road Championships
8th Overall Tour de Langkawi
9th Overall Flèche du Sud
2017
5th Overall Tour of Japan
2018
7th Chrono Kristin Armstrong
