= Audax Australia =

Australian cycling club

Audax Australia Cycling Club Inc.
- Abbreviation: Audax Australia
- Formation: 1981
- Type: Sporting club
- Region served: Australia
- President: Brian Hornby
- Affiliations: Audax Club Parisien, Union des Audax Français, Les Randonneurs Mondiaux, Cycling Australia
- Website: audax.org.au

Audax Australia Cycling Club runs cycling events under the auspices of Audax Club Parisien (ACP) and Union des Audax Français (UAF). Rides are normally from 50 km to 1200 km in distance and operate throughout Australia. The club also has a list of long distance rides that can be ridden at any time called raids.

The name Audax Australia is a misnomer as the organisation runs events that are predominantly in the style of randonneur (long-distance over an unmarked course), although it also runs audax-style where a ride captain dictates the speed of the ride.

== Ride types ==
Calendar rides are held on a specific date and appearing in the Audax Australia calendar. Permanent rides can be ridden by Audax Australia members at any time.

Calendar and permanent rides take several forms:

- Brevet Randonneur Mondiaux (BRM): 200 kilometres or greater calendar rides controlled through a series of time and distance checks by means of a brevet card. BRM rides are registered with ACP or Les Randonneurs Mondiaux and appear in the Randonneur Mondiaux calendar published by ACP or the calendar published by LRM.
- Brevet UAF (BUAF): 100 km or greater calendar rides ridden under UAF rules (peloton riding at a fixed pace) and registered with the UAF.
- Brevet Gravel (BG): calendar rides up to 400 kilometres where the route is Mixed terrain or Gravel roads, controlled similarly to BRM rides and registered with Audax Australia only.
- Brevet Australia (BA): calendar rides controlled similarly to BRM rides but registered with Audax Australia only.
- Brevet Dirt (BD): calendar rides shorter than 200 kilometres where the route is primarily off road MTB on unsealed surfaces, controlled similarly to BRM rides and registered with Audax Australia only.
- Brevet Permanent (BP): permanent rides where the route may be either primarily on sealed or unsealed surfaces and controlled similarly to BRM rides but registered with Audax Australia only.
- Brevet Raid (BR): point-to-point multi-day permanent rides that do not have time limits on intermediate checkpoints and are registered with Audax Australia only.

== Feature Rides ==
=== The Fleche Opperman All Day Trial ===
The Fleche Opperman is a ride for teams of three to five bicycles and is held over 24 hours. The course and distance are chosen by each team and must be at least 360 km long and finish in either Rochester (Victoria) or the capital cities in other states (where run). The ride is named after former patron of the club Sir Hubert Opperman, and its format based on the French equivalent Flèche Velocio.

First run in October 1985, the finish coincided with the Bicycle Expo, held at the world Trade Center Melbourne. Although the Fleche Opperman All Day Trial is a non-competitive ride, teams successfully completing the furthest distance are officially recognised. In its inaugural year the Port Fairy Cycling Club, including Graham Woodrup, achieved this honour completing a total distance of 570 km.

=== Sunshine State 1200 ===
The Sunshine State 1200 randonnée starts in Brisbane and crosses the Great Dividing Range to an area known as the Darling Downs, makes two loops centred on the bustling town of Oakey before returning to Brisbane. The next ride will be held from 24th to 27th of May 2025.

=== Great Southern Randonnée (GSR) ===
The GSR is an iconic 1,200 km randonnée held every four years, with 1,000 and 300 km options. The 1,200 km route starts in Anglesea, heading along the spectacular Great Ocean Road, into the Otway Ranges, back along the coastal road to Port Fairy and then inland via the Grampians National Park (Gariwerd) before returning along the same route. The seventh edition of the GSR was held on Oct 2024.

=== Tour de Tasmanie ===
The Tour de Tasmanie is a circumnavigation of the island of Tasmania based on a traditional cycle touring route, and is held every second year during the summer.

=== Sydney–Melbourne 1200 ===
The SM1200 runs every four years starting on the foreshores of Sydney Harbour Bridge and finishing in downtown Melbourne. The route travels through Australia's national capital, Canberra. The next ride will be from the 6th to 9th of April 2025.

=== Perth–Augusta–Perth (PAP) ===
The PAP runs every four years in Western Australia. Previous editions have gone out to the South-coast town of Albany and back to Perth. In 2022, the new route heads south-west to the coastal town of Augusta and then travelling through Margaret River and then inland via tall-timbered forest back to Perth.

== Awards ==
Riders can obtain awards for completing BRM, BUAF, BA and BP rides. Most awards are available only to full members of Audax Australia.

There are four Riding Award categories:

- Single Season – defined rides
- Single Season – cumulative distance
- Multi-Season – defined rides
- Multi-Season – cumulative distance

An Audax riding season is between 1 November and 31 October.

=== Single Season Awards ===
==== Defined Rides ====
Australian Super Randonneur: 1,500 km minimum, comprising one ride each of 200 km, 300 km, 400 km and 600 km.

Australian Interstate Super Randonneur: as above, where each distance must be ridden in a different State or Territory of Australia.

Gran Turismo Super Randonneur: a specified series of Audax Australia calendared events of 200 km, 300 km, 400 km and 600 km all ridden within a 9-day period.

Year Round Randonneur: One ride each calendar month for a total of 12 consecutive months, ride distance to be at least 200 km.

Petit Year Round Randonneur: One ride per calendar month for a total of 12 consecutive months, with a minimum ride distance of 50 km.

Dirt Series: 205 km minimum comprising one Brevet Dirt (off-road) ride of each of 35 km, 70 km and 100 km.

Nouveau Randonneur: 300 km minimum comprising one ride of each of 50 km, 100 km and 150 km.

==== Cumulative Distance ====
The Audax Australia Annual Award recognises the cumulative total of Audax or randonneuring kilometres ridden in a single season. Award distances are as follows:

- 1,000 km
- 2,500 km
- 5,000 km
- 7,500 km
- 10,000 km

=== Multi-Season Awards ===
==== Defined Rides ====
The Woodrup 5000 Award consists of 5,000 km minimum of road rides within 4 continuous seasons, including:

- Fleche Opperman All Day Trial (360 km)
- Super Randonneur
- 1 × 1,000 km ride
- 1 × 1,200 km ride (Paris-Brest-Paris not permitted)
- 950 km of other road rides homologated by the Audax Club Parisien.

The Ultra Randonneur requires 50 road rides without time limit. These must comprise the following:

- 10 × Super Randonneur (200 km, 300 km, 400 km and 600 km rides in a single season)
- 10 × rides of at least 1,000 km

==== Cumulative Distance ====
The Australian Randonneur Award recognises lifetime riding achievements for the following cumulative distances:

- 25,000 km
- 50,000 km
- 75,000 km
- 100,000 km
- 150,000 km

== Publications ==
Audax Australia's magazine Checkpoint is produced quarterly and is circulated to current financial members. The Journal (the predecessor to Checkpoint) was first produced in summer of 1983 by Terry Gross.

The first National Rides Calendar was produced in 1995 by Peter Moore.

== History ==
Audax Australia was formed in 1981. The first officially homologated Australian ride took place at Easter of that year, following near-simultaneous letters to the ACP by Alan Walker and Russell Moore. Riders started simultaneous 600 km rides from Melbourne and Sydney finishing in Albury.

The club offers a calendar of events in all states and the Australian Capital Territory, and (until 2010) in New Zealand. Since late 2010, Kiwi Randonneurs has operated as an unincorporated society and operates randonnees in New Zealand under an individual agreement with the Audax Club Parisien.

=== Introduction of new ride types ===
==== Dirt Rides ====
Dirt, or MTB rides, were initiated in the 1997/98 season with the first ride being the 70 km Tracks of My Tiers on Sunday 2 November 1997 in southern Tasmania, followed by the 35 km, 70 km and 100 km 'Down and Dirty' rides on Sunday 8 February starting at Trentham, Victoria. These rides then traversed around the Wombat State Forest and Lerderderg Gorge.

Dirt rides are normally run over three distances of 35 km, 70 km and 100 km. A Dirt series award is riding all three in a season.

==== BUAF ====
Fixed-pace rides following the model of the Union des Audax Français (UAF) were introduced to Audax Australia in 2008, and are often referred to as "BUAF" to distinguish them from randonneur style rides. BUAF brevets are ridden as a peloton with a leader, generally averaging 22.5 km/h between checkpoints. The organiser has a published ride schedule, noting the expected time the peloton will reach each turn and rest stop and the time the peloton will leave each rest stop.

=== Patrons and Life Members ===
==== Patrons ====
- Sir Hubert Opperman until 1996 (Oppy was also patron of Audax UK)
- Lady Opperman, from 1997 until 2001

==== Life Members ====
- Lorraine Allen
- Phil Bellette
- Peter Donnan
- Howard Dove
- Hans Dusink
- Terry Gross
- Don Halton
- Enid Halton
- Peter Heal
- Tim Laugher
- John Martin
- Peter Mathews
- Peter Moore
- Russell Moore
- Rebecca Morton
- Russell Noble
- Matthew Rawnsley
- Christopher Rogers
- Alan Walker

== See also ==
- Audax (cycling)
- Randonneur
- Brevet (cycling)
- Cyclosportive
- Bicycle lighting
- Cycling in Australia
