= Audax UK =

British cycling club

Audax United Kingdom Long Distance Cyclists' Association
- Jurisdiction: United Kingdom
- Membership: 9599 (end 2025)
- Founded: 1976
- Affiliation: Audax Club Parisien and Les Randonneurs Mondiaux
- Chairman: Andy Cox
- Secretary: Gideon Rabinowitz

Official website
- www.audax.uk

Audax UK or AUK is a British cycling club that oversees randonneuring (long-distance cycling) in the United Kingdom. It was formed in 1976 to help British riders complete the qualifying rides for entry to the Paris-Brest-Paris randonnee. Audax UK is recognised by Audax Club Parisien as the official brevet-coordinating organization for the United Kingdom, although in practice events in Northern Ireland are organised by Audax Ireland. Audax UK members sometimes informally describe themselves as AUKs.

By the end of 2025 Audax UK membership had exceeded 9,500 with over 600 "calendar" events (i.e. mass rides that take place on a specific day) yet. These events are open to all riders, whether they are Audax UK members or not (non-members pay a small fee for "temporary membership" for the duration of the event). The official magazine, Arrivée, is published four times per year.

== Events ==
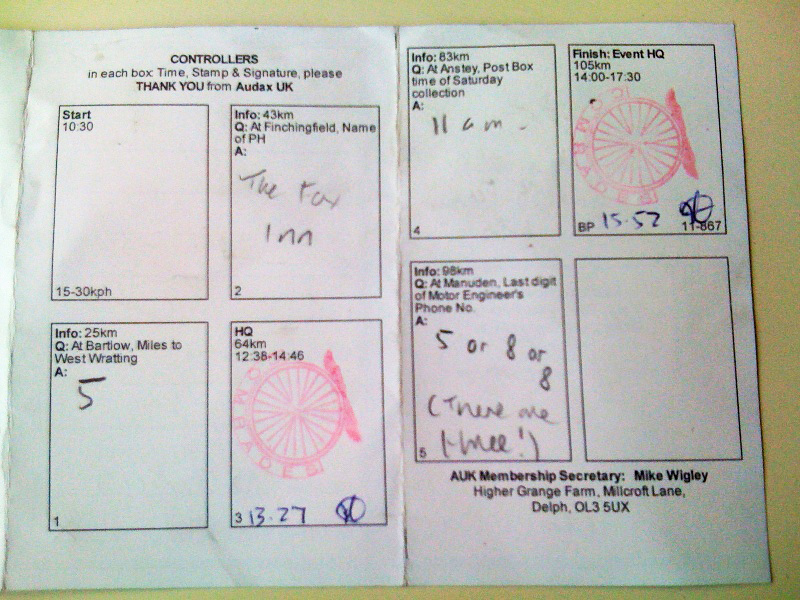
A completed brevet card from a 100 kilometres (62 mi) 'populaire' calendar event, overseen by Audax UK.

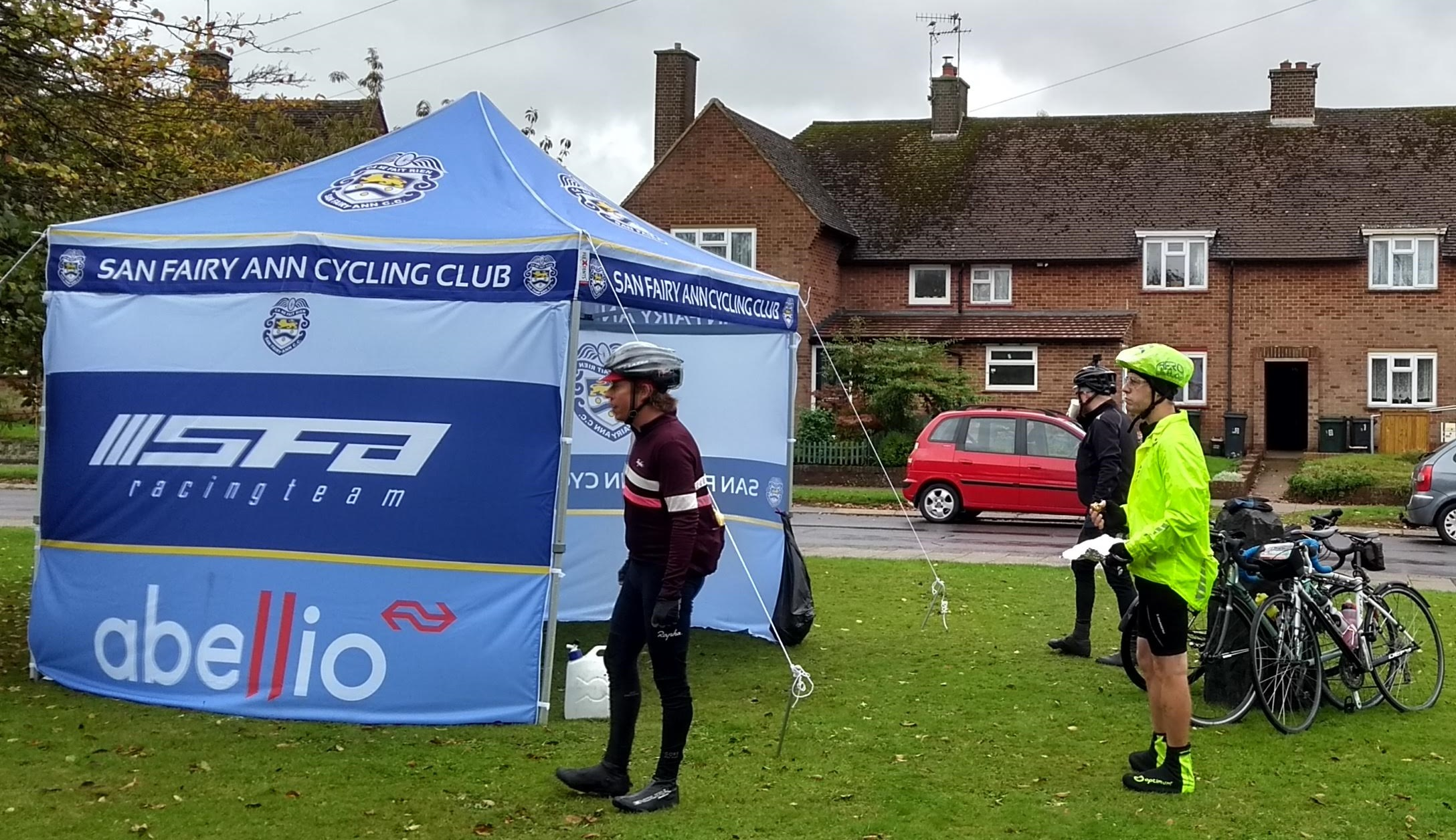
A control point on an Audax UK event in Wye, Kent.

AUK coordinates and validates Audax events but does not organise any events directly; these are typically organised by existing cycle clubs, local Cycling UK groups, or informal local Audax groups such as "Audax Club Mid-Essex" or "Audax Ecosse". The events are non-competitive, with riders needing only to complete the ride distance within specified time limits. There are three types of rides:

- Calendar events are organised with some similarities to sportives, although with more emphasis on self-sufficiency. Rides of 200 km and above are known as Brevets de Randonneurs, whereas rides under 200 km are known as Brevets Populaires.
- A "permanent" is a designated route which can be ridden by the rider on a day of their choice. The attempt is subsequently validated by AUK. The routes have usually been used for calendar events in the past.
- A "DIY" allows the rider to design their own route (which must be validated by "proof of passage" or a GPS track) and the day of the ride.

In the 2025–26 season, over 24,000 rides were completed and validated.

=== Notable rides ===
The notable calendar events include London–Edinburgh–London, held every four years; the National 400; London-Wales-London (formerly the Severn Across), a 400 km ride from West London to Chepstow in Wales and back again; the Bryan Chapman Memorial, a 600 km ride from Chepstow in SE Wales to Anglesey and back; and the Mille Pennines, a 1000 km ride held in Northern England. The "Dorset Coast 200 km" is the oldest continuously organised (since 1978) 200 km calendar event in the UK.

In the 2019 season, the most popular events for each distance were:

- 100 km – Devon Delight, Newton Abbot
- 200 km – Ditchling Devil, Wimbledon
- 300 km – 3Down, Chalfont St Peter
- 400 km – Brevet Cymru, Chepstow
- 600 km – Bryan Chapman Memorial, Chepstow

=== National 400 ===
The National is a 400 km "flagship" calendar event originally organised by the CTC in 1982. This was re-established in 2012 and has been organised by a different local group each summer:

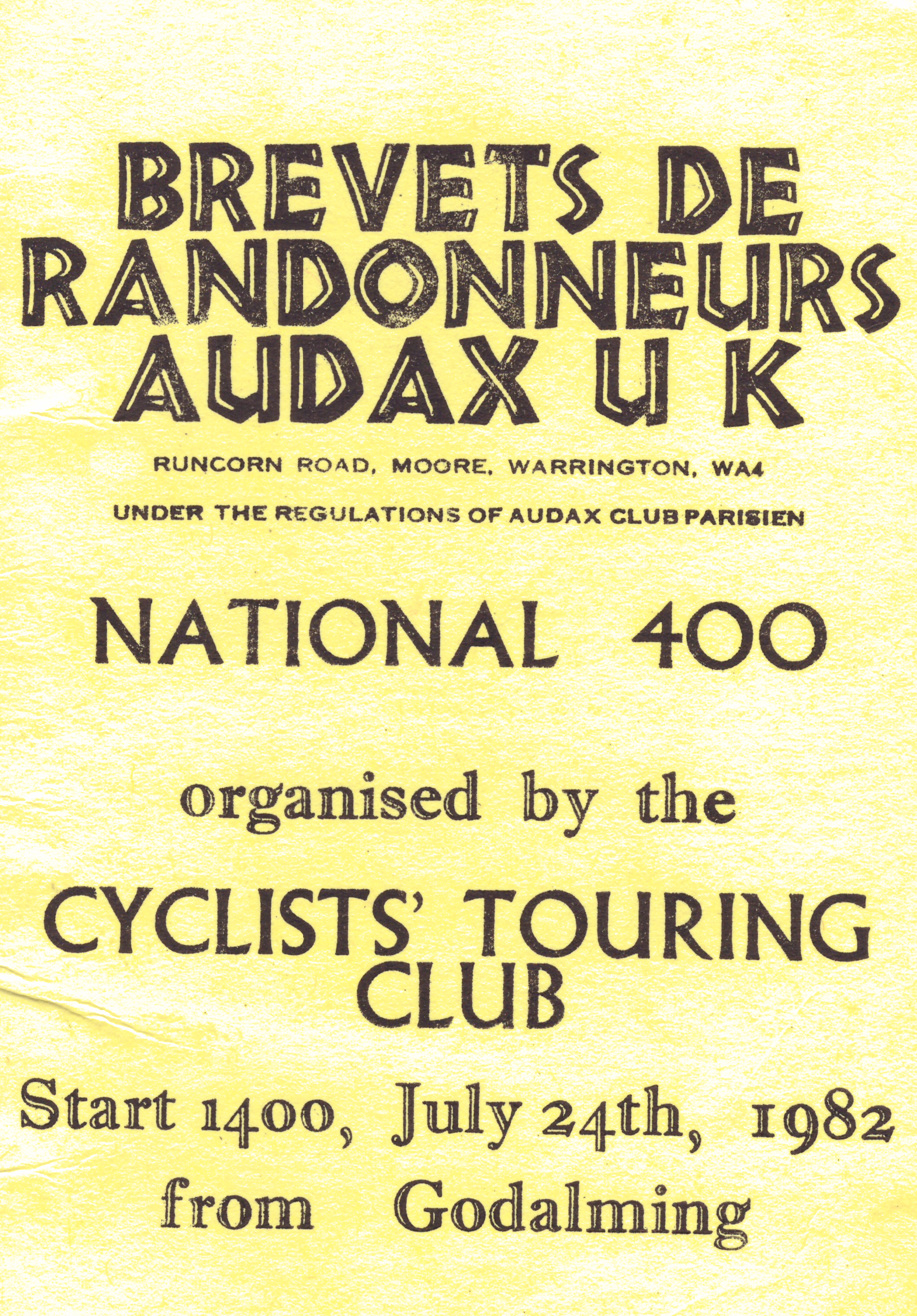
Cover of 1982 National 400 km Brevet Card

- 1982 – Charterhouse School, organised by CTC
- 1983 – Charterhouse School, organised by CTC
- 1984 – Lincoln Cathedral, organised by Witham Section
- 1985 – Charterhouse School, organised by CTC
- 1988 – Oxford, organised by Oxford CTC
- 1993 – Exeter Quay, organised by Devon DA
- 1995 – Poole Harbour, organised by Wessex CTC
- 2012 – East Anglia, organised by Norfolk Audax
- 2013 – West Country, organised by Exeter Wheelers
- 2014 – Yorkshire Dales and North Pennines, organised by VC167
- 2015 – Scottish Highlands, organised by CTC Highland
- 2016 – Cheshire and Wales, organised by Peak Audax
- 2017 – Mid Wales and the Marches, organised by Shropshire CTC
- 2018-2024 – not held
- 2025 - Essex, organised by Audax Club Mid-Essex
- 2026 - Yorkshire

=== Arrows ===
The Easter Arrow and Summer Arrow are team events in the flèche style, in which teams have 24 hours to ride as far as possible and finish in York.

== Time limits ==
The time limits for Brevets de Randonneurs Mondiaux rides are set by ACP as follows:
♦ 200 km – 13 hours 30 minutes
♦ 300 km – 20 hours
♦ 400 km – 27 hours
♦ 600 km – 40 hours

Brevet Populaire events can be run at slower speeds than BRM events.

== Points and awards ==
Points are awarded on the basis of 0.5 points for every full 50 km ridden. The AUK season runs from 1 November to 31 October each year. There are trophies for the highest scoring individuals and clubs each year, and results are published on the Audax Website

Audax UK allow members to qualify for numerous awards, as set out in the tables below. All distances are in kilometres (km).

In parallel to the main points system, there is the Audax Altitude Award (AAA) system for grimpeurs. AAA points are awarded on the basis of 1 point for every 1000m of climbing, rounded to the nearest quarter point and subject to a minimum climb rate which depends on the distance.

=== Distance Awards ===
Medals or cloth badges are available for individual rides of the following distances: 50 km, 100 km, 150 km, 200 km, 300 km, 400 km, 600 km and 1,000 km.

=== Randonneur Awards ===
The Randonneur awards aim to encourage riders to progress through increasing distances, and are awarded for rides completed within a single season.

The Super Randonneur is awarded for completing 200 km, 300 km, 400 km and 600 km rides in one season. 458 riders completed an SR in the 2017 season. Entrants to Paris-Brest-Paris must ride this series in the same year as the PBP ride to qualify for a place. Some groups organise their own "Super Randonneur Series" of these distances, such as the Mid-Essex series and the Wessex series.

Award name	50k	100k	150k	200k	300k	400k	500k	600k	1000k	1200k+	Timespan	Other requirements
Randonneur 500 (CB)	Y	Y	Y	Y							1 season	Longer distances can be substituted
Randonneur 1000 (M/CB)		Y		Y	Y						1 season	Plus another 400 km of events
Super Randonneur (M/CB)				Y	Y	Y		Y			1 season	Longer distances can be substituted
Super Randonneur 2500				Y	Y	Y		Y	Y		1 season	no substitutions allowed
Randonneur 5000 (CB)	Audax events totalling 5,000 km										1 season	
Randonneur 10000 (CB)	Audax events totalling 10,000 km										1 season	

=== Brevet Awards ===
The Brevet awards encourage riders to keep riding over several seasons, with the exception of the Brevet 500 which is aimed at younger riders and is awarded for rides within a single season.

Award name	50k	100k	150k	200k	300k	400k	500k	600k	1000k	1200k+	E2E	PBP	LEL	24hr	Timespan	Notes
Brevet 500		x5													1 season	Or 2x100km and 2x150km
Brevet 1000 (M)		x10													Lifetime	see note 2
Brevet 2000		x20													Lifetime	see note 3
Brevet 3000		events totalling 3000 km													Lifetime	
Brevet 4000 (CB)				x20											Lifetime	
Brevet 5000 (M)				Y	Y	Y		Y	Y		either			Y	4 years	see note 4
Brevet 25000 (CB)				x3	x3	x3		x3	Y	Y		either		Y	6 years	see note 5

=== Special awards ===
Award name	50k	100k	150k	200k	300k	400k	500k	600k	1000k	1200k+	E2E	PBP	LEL	24hr	Timespan	Notes
Randonneur Round the Year (CB)				At least one 200 km or longer in 12 successive calendar months											Lifetime	
International Super Randonneur (CB)				Y	Y	Y		Y							Lifetime	see note 6
Bronze Grimpeur (M)	any Audax event worth ¼ to ½ AAA point														N/A	
Silver Grimpeur (M)	any Audax event worth ¾ to 1¾ AAA points														N/A	
Gold Grimpeur (M)	any Audax event worth 2 or more AAA points														N/A	
Audax Altitude Award (M/CB)	accumulation of 12 or more AAA points, i.e. 20,000m of climbing														Lifetime	
AAA Triple Award (CB)	accumulation of 3 Audax Altitude Awards														Lifetime	
AAA 3x3 Award (CB)	accumulation of 3 AAA Triple Awards														Lifetime	

=== Notes to tables ===
1. M = medal, CB = cloth badge
2. 10 rides include rides ridden in Brevet 500; alternatively, 5x200km Audax events in one Season
3. alternatively, 10x200km Audax events
4. plus additional Audax events to top up to 5000 km
5. plus additional Audax events to top up to 25000 km; 200k, 300k, 400k and 600k rides are officially defined as a Super Randonneur series and as such longer events may substitute for shorter ones of these
6. each event must take place in a different country; additional levels of the award also exist, e.g.: ISR(2C) if they are held between 2 continents

== See also ==
- British Cycling
- Cycling Time Trials
- Cycling UK
- Audax Club Parisien
