= Alpine Classic =

Australian cycling event

Audax Alpine Classic
- Climbing Mount Buffalo in 2008

General
| Established | 1986 |
| Held | January |
| Country | Australia |
| Region | North East Victoria |
| Type | Audax |

Data
| Organiser | Audax Australia |
| Distance | 200 km |

The Alpine Classic (formerly Audax Alpine Classic) was an Australian bicycle event run every Australia Day weekend (late January) in Bright, Victoria. The decision was made to permanently cancel the event as it was being run at a loss. The event is currently managed by O2 Events, having previously been organised by Audax Australia volunteers. Arguably the most difficult single day cycle event in Australia with the 200 km version covering four steep climbs. All distances start at Howitt Park in Bright and are on open roads.

== Distances ==
- Alpine Classic Ultimate (320km) First run in 2015, this event starts with the 72 km out-and-back ride to Mt Buffalo summit (see below) then takes the 250 km ACE250 route (see next item).
- Alpine Classic Extreme (250km) First run in 2010 after surfacing of the Bogong High Plains Road beyond Falls Creek was completed in 2009. The route commences in Bright and travels through Harrietville, Mt Hotham, Dinner Plain, Omeo, Anglers Rest, Falls Creek, Mt Beauty and over the Tawonga Gap back to Bright. It is very similar to the SCODY 3 Peaks Challenge, other than the starting location.
- Audax Alpine Classic (200km) The most popular distance that has the four ascents of Tawonga Gap, Falls Creek, Tawonga Gap and Mount Buffalo. The route commences in Bright and travels through Germantown, Tawonga, Mount Beauty, and Falls Creek, before returning to Bright along the same route. The route the continues to Porepunkah then Mount Buffalo and once again returns to Bright.
- Audax Alpine Classic "Sunrise over Buffalo" (200km) Introduced in 2014, a variation on the traditional 200 km route, this route commences in Bright and heads first to Porepunkah then Mount Buffalo and back to Bright, then through Germantown, Tawonga, Mount Beauty, and Falls Creek, before returning to Bright along the same route. Like the Alpine Classic Extreme 250, this ride starts at 4am, hence the reference to sunrise.
- Audax Alpine Classic (140km) From Bright travels through Germantown and Tawonga to Mount Beauty before returning to Bright. The route continues to Porepunkah then Mount Buffalo and once again returns to Bright. The 140 uses the same route as the 200 km but does not ascend Falls Creek.
- Audax Alpine Classic (130km) The route commences in Bright and travels through Germantown, Tawonga, Mount Beauty, and Falls Creek, before returning to Bright along the same route. The 130 uses the same route as the 200 km but does not continue to Mount Buffalo.
- Audax Alpine Classic (72km) The route commences in Bright and travels to Mount Buffalo through Porepunkah before returning to Bright.
- Audax Alpine Classic (60km) The route commences in Bright and travels to Mount Beauty through the Tawonga Gap before returning to Bright.

== AAC History ==
The first AAC was run on Australia day 1986 over a 200 km circuit with just six riders.

=== 2003 ===
The 2003 Eastern Victorian alpine bushfires prevented the ride proceeding. This was due to the uncertainty of if the fire would flare up, the road surface and the residual smoke. A significant number of rider refunds were redirected to the Bright Country Fire Authority.

=== 2006 ===
The hot year where the temperature was around 42 degrees but with the reflected heat off the road surface played havoc with all riders. Only 31% finished the 200 km and as a result the rules were changed to protect riders in extreme heat.

=== 2007 ===
In excess of 2000 riders battled the hills in relatively easy conditions.

=== 2008 ===
Another year with ideal riding conditions and over 2000 riders. Barcode readers were first introduced to improve processing of rider times. A post ride function called "Bonjour Bright" commenced.

=== 2010 ===
Introduction of the Alpine Classic Extreme and the Alpine Raid, the latter being "a two-day event which follows the same route as the Alpine Classic's ACE250 event".

=== 2012 ===
A very hot year with temperatures nearing the maximum permissible for the event to continue.

=== 2013 ===
A bushfire near Harrietville a week before the event caused the event organisers to re-route all events to Mt Buffalo. The 140 km event became two ascents of Buffalo, the 200 km became three ascents, and the ACE250 became three extended ascents (to Cresta). In the words of the organisers, "The roads around Falls Creek will be used by emergency services vehicles on the weekend. Sending a large number of riders onto those roads would not be safe or responsible." By the time the event took place, the bushfire threat eased, and the risk of the fire spreading towards Falls Creek had not eventuated. However, the decision could not be reversed, infuriating some riders.

=== 2014 ===
Introduction of a new ride option, "Sunrise over Buffalo".

=== 2020 ===
Bushfires and heavy smoke around the Alpine Area prompted event organisers to cancel the scheduled 34th edition of the Alpine Classic, which was set to be hosted on the 25th and 26 January 2020.

On 3 January 2020, a State of Disaster was declared in response to the fires burning in the North East and Alpine areas of Victoria and East Gippsland. All roads and communities around the Alpine Classic route were impacted by bushfires and a heavy smoke reduced air quality and visibility.

=== 2021-2023 ===
Rides were run over the next three years, but with limited entries due to COVID-19 border closures, extreme heat (2022) and a landslide (2023).

=== 2024 and beyond ===
The 2024 event was cancelled due to costs and low registrations, with "no future date set for the event".

Various routes around Bright and the Alpine region are on offer to Audax Australia members, usually as self-supported rides.

== Community interaction ==
The 2008 was calculated to have an approximate net benefit to host community of $814,176.44 and is one of the largest annual events in the north-east of Victoria.

== See also ==
- Audax (cycling)
- Audax Australia
- Randonneur
- Brevet (cycling)
- Cyclosportive
