= René Herse =

French bicycle framebuilder (1908–1976)

René Louis Théodore Herse (1908–1976) was a French builder of high-quality touring, randonneur and racing bicycles. His works are sought by collectors and riders.

== Career ==
Herse was born in Caen. He started working on prototype aircraft at the aircraft maker Breguet. In 1938, he introduced lightweight aluminum bicycle components: pedals, cranks, cantilever brakes and stems. The bike fitted with these components that was displayed at the 1938 "Concours de Machines" weighed only 7.94 kg (17.50 lb) – almost 1 kg (2 lb) lighter than any of his competitors. In 1940, he began making complete bicycles. Herse was a "constructeur", meaning he built not just the frame but the entire bike.

His hand-built bicycles were described as "the pinnacle of French cycling" from the 1940s until his death. Herse died in Paris.

== Competition successes ==
Herse bikes won technical trials in wartime and post-war France. His riders and especially his daughter Lyli Herse (see below) won numerous times in the Polymultipliée de Chanteloup hillclimb races. Herse's riders won the Challenge des Constructeurs for the builder with the three best-placed riders in the Paris-Brest-Paris randonneur event every time from 1948 until 1971, and again in 1975. Six victories out of ten times the trophy was attributed has never been equalled.

His frames were ridden to victory by racers including Louison Bobet. Geneviève Gambillon won the world championships (female) on René Herse in 1972 and 1974.

== Family ==
His daughter, Lyli, won eight national female cycling championships in France. After René Herse's death, Lyli Herse and her husband Jean Desbois, who was one of Herse's best framebuilders, continued the René Herse company until 1986. They also completed back orders of bicycles, so the last classic René Herse bikes were made in 1988.

== Today ==
In the early 2000s, Lyli approached Jan Heine, the editor of Bicycle Quarterly magazine and founder of Compass Bicycles, with the request of taking over the René Herse trademark and assets in order to safeguard them for the future. In late 2018, Compass Bicycles officially changed the company name to Rene Herse Cycles, to fully safeguard the trademark and legacy.
