= Reliability trial =

Organised bicycle ride

A reliability trial is an organised bicycle ride which challenges a cyclist to complete a course, passing through designated control points, within a preset time limit. In the United Kingdom, such events are often held in the wintry opening months of the year and are used by club cyclists as training rides. A common test would be a 100 in 8 – 160 kilometres (100 mi) miles would have to be completed within eight hours, including any stops.

The term is historic and dates back to the early years of the 20th century when cycling equipment was less reliable, roads were rougher, routes were more poorly sign-posted, and mobile telephones had yet to be invented. The name was also a way of emphasising to the police, at a time when the place of cycle sport on British roads was insecure, that the mass rides they might see were not races.

Reliability trial riders needed to be self-sufficient, adept at navigation, able to deal with mechanical problems, and fit enough to complete the course. In some cases, successful completion of the ride entitles the rider to a certificate. Reliability trials have lost much of their popularity although they remain a regular feature for sections, or clubs, of Cycling UK. The function of reliability trials as a test of fitness, reliability and the ability to ride long distances has largely passed to the similar randonneuring or Audax styles of riding.

The term reliability trial is also used to refer to motorsport events and are similar in concept. Rather like rallying, drivers and their vehicles (or riders and their motorcycles) must complete a designated course within a set time limit, without recourse to outside help along the way.

== See also ==
- Randonnée
- Challenge riding
