= Flèche (cycling) =

Type of team cycling competition

A flèche (/ˈflɛʃ/) is a team cycling competition, undertaken by randonneurs; the term is derived from "Flèche Velocio". It differs from the more common randonnees or brevets, which are individual events and not specifically competitive. As with other randonneuring events, flèches are governed by national and local authorities, such as Randonneurs USA (RUSA) which publish the governing rules. The object of a flèche is to ride the maximum distance in a fixed time, usually 24 hours, and usually finishing at or near a specified location, riding a route that the team has specified before the start; different teams generally do not have to follow the same route. Teams usually comprise up to five riders, of which three must finish in order to complete the flèche; the usual minimum distance is 360 km. Flèche competitions traditionally take place on or about the Easter holiday.

The flèche event can also be run in a completely non-competitive manner, such as the FLÈCHE Northern CALIFORNIA.

== Background ==
The word flèche is French, meaning "arrow". In the cycling context it evokes the image of teams converging on a destination as arrows might on a target in an archery competition.

== See also ==
- La Flèche Wallonne
