= London–Edinburgh–London =

Bicycle event

Race details
- Region: United Kingdom
- Nickname: LEL
- Type: Endurance Brevet Cycling Event
- Organiser: Audax UK

History
- First edition: 1989
- Editions: 9 (as of 2022)

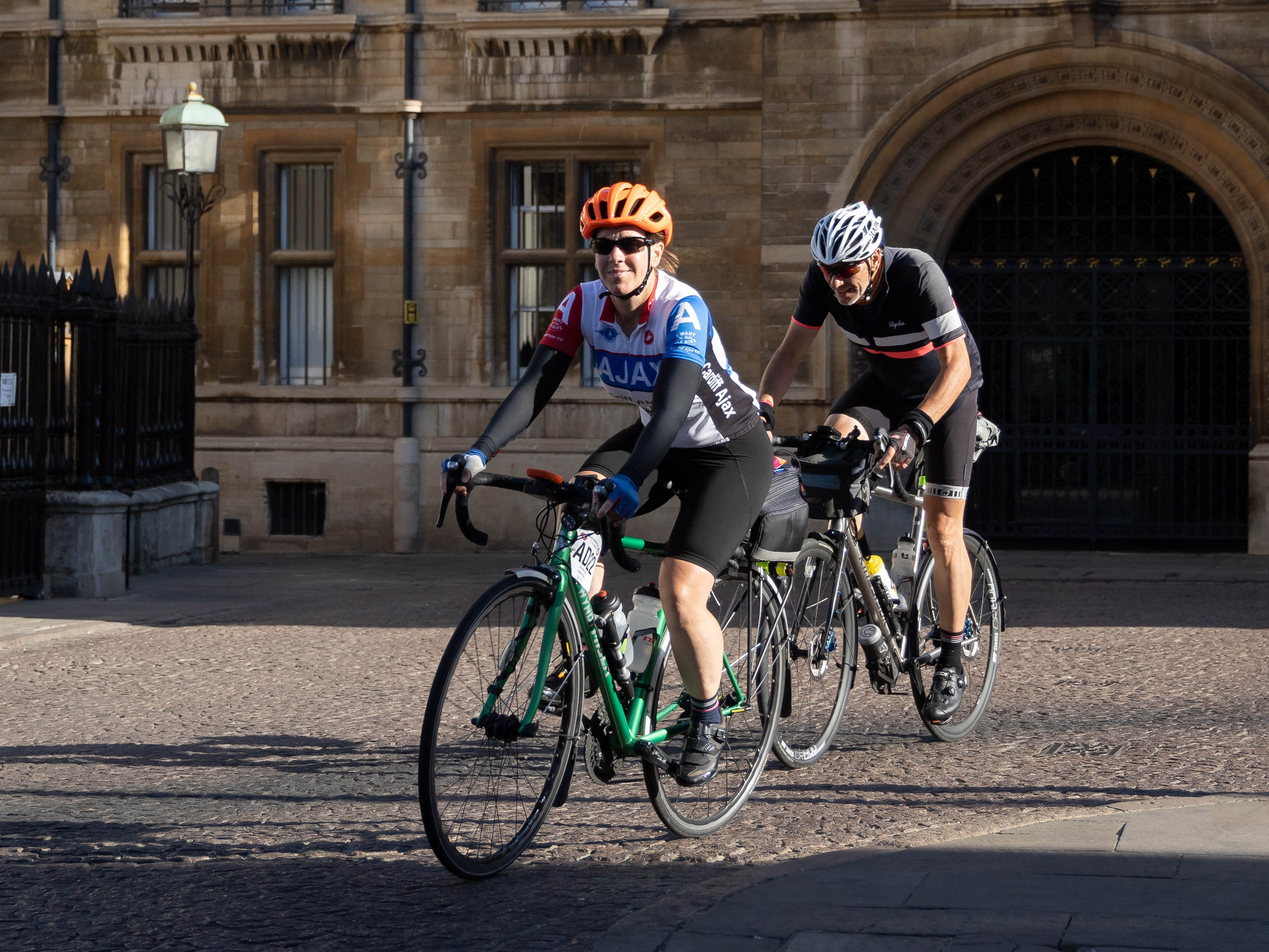
Randonneurs cycle through Cambridge on London-Edinburgh-London 2022

London–Edinburgh–London (LEL) is a randonnée bicycle event of approximately 1,500 kilometres (930 mi) over an out-and-back course between the capital cities of London (England) and Edinburgh (Scotland). It has been described as a contender for hardest cycling event in the United Kingdom.

The event has been held every four years since 1989, with the latest edition starting on 3 August 2025.

== Description and history ==
LEL is the flagship event of Audax UK. It is held every four years, two years after Paris–Brest–Paris. It is part of the brevet series and is a noncompetitive endurance bicycle event.

=== 1989 to 2001 ===
The first LEL was in 1989, when there were 29 starters and 26 finishers, all British. For that inaugural ride, the distance was 1,300 km (810 mi), and the route included a stretch of the A68 road. Finishers of that original event are sometimes referred to as the A68 Club. The inaugural ride did not start in London, but in Doncaster, the home town of the organiser. Riders headed first north to Edinburgh and back, then south to London and back.

=== 2005 ===
For the fifth edition in 2005, there were 306 starters and 246 finishers, from the UK, mainland Europe, and other countries including Japan, Russia, Australia, the USA, and Canada. Riders set out from Cheshunt, on the northern outskirts of London, or from Thorne, close to the original Doncaster start.

The 2005 route was just over 1360 km long and arrived in Edinburgh via The Granites.

=== 2009 ===
31 nations took part in the 2009 ride, which started and ended at Cheshunt.

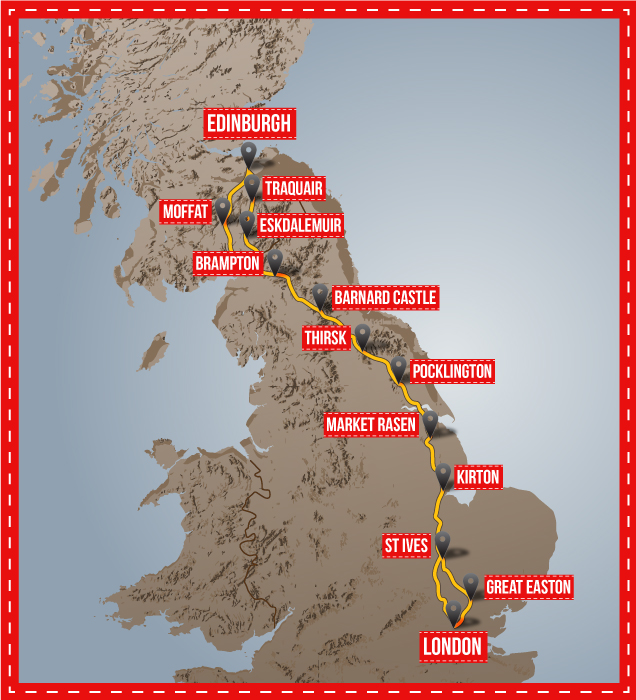

=== 2013 ===
The 2013 edition was held between 28 July and 2 August and 34 nations took part. This was the first edition organised by Danial Webb, who has organised all subsequent editions. In a departure from previous editions, the route took a loop through Scotland, and for the first time passed over the Humber Bridge.

805 riders finished the event in 2013.

The ride started and ended at Davenant Foundation School in Loughton. The control points/accommodation stops were at:

- Great Easton (southbound only)
- St Ivo School in St Ives
- Middlecott School in Kirton
- De Aston School in Market Rasen
- Lyndhurst School in Pocklington
- Thirsk School
- Teesdale School in Barnard Castle
- Alston (optional shelter)
- William Howard School in Brampton
- Moffat Academy (northbound only)
- Gracemount High School in Edinburgh
- Traquair (southbound only)
- Eskdalemuir (southbound only)

All other controls were used in both directions.

=== 2017 ===
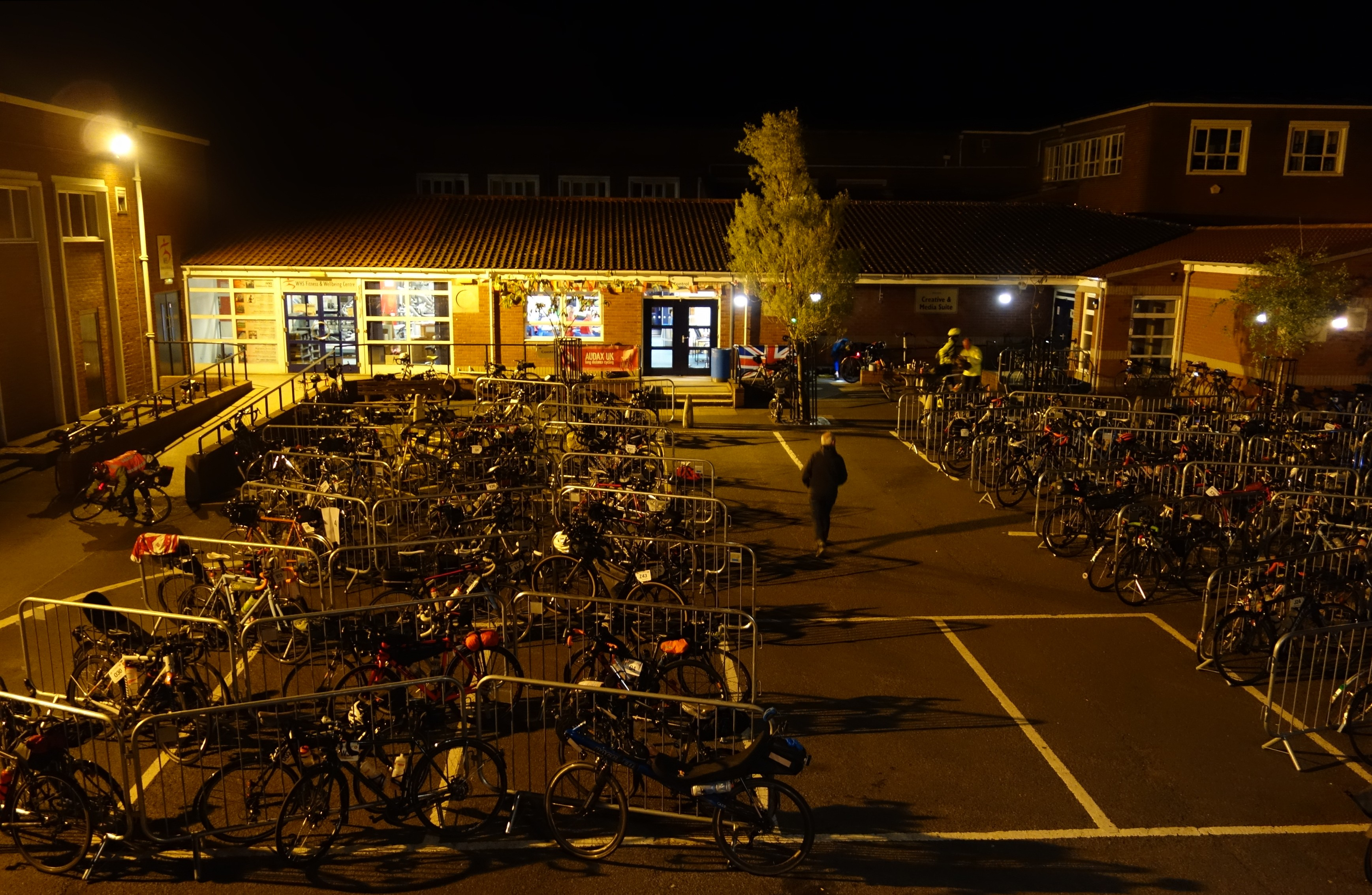
Brampton control at night, LEL 2017.

The 2017 edition took place between 30 July and 4 August 2017, attracting 1600 entrants from 55 nations. 810 of these finished in time. The 2017 route was 1441 km long and had 11,128m of climbing. The time allowance was 117 hours 05 minutes, or 100 hours for those riders who choose it.

The ride started and ended at Davenant Foundation School in Loughton. The control points/accommodation stops were at:

- Great Easton (southbound only)
- St Ivo School in St Ives
- Spalding Grammar School
- King Edward VI Grammar School in Louth
- Pocklington School
- Coxwold (optional shelter)
- Thirsk School
- Barnard Castle School
- Alston (optional shelter)
- William Howard School in Brampton
- Moffat Academy (northbound only)
- Eskdalemuir (southbound only)
- Innerleithen (southbound only)
- Gracemount High School in Edinburgh

All other controls were used in both directions.

=== 2022 ===
The 2021 event was postponed due to the COVID-19 pandemic and as a result took place between 7 and 12 August 2022. The route was extended to 1540 km, with a time allowance of 128 hours and 20 minutes for the main group and 100 hours for the first group. The route extended out to Dunfermline so included a crossing of the Firth of Forth, and passed through Edinburgh city centre.

=== 2025 ===
The 2025 event was the largest edition yet with over 2,100 riders from 57 countries crossing the start line at either the Guildhall Yard Guildhall in London or at Writtle College near Chelmsford Writtle University College on Sunday 3 August. However, the event was curtailed the following day due to Storm Floris.

The Event had controls at Northstowe, Boston, Louth, Hessle, Malton, Richmond, Alston, Brampton, Hawick, Moffat and Dalketh on the way North. The return route included Innerleithen and Eskdalemuir but not Hawick.

During the Monday, as concerns about the storm continued, the organisers, first paused the event and then, in the evening, invited riders to return South from wherever they were. Only one rider at that point had actually made it as far as Dalkeith and large numbers of participants were at the controls in Yorkshire.

Throughout the rest of the week, the riders returned south, calling at the controls.

The curtailment represented a considerable logistical effort as the organisers repositioned food and materials which would otherwise been unused in Scotland.

LEL 2025 was notable for the numbers of volunteers. Over 1,000 people were involved in supporting the event.

Unused food from controls was commonly donated to local charities.
