= BMB =

BMB or B.M.B. may mean:

- Bhartiya Mahila Bank, India's first bank exclusively for women, Headquarters in New Delhi
- Blind man's buff, a popular children's game
- Brian Michael Bendis, American comic book writer
- Boston–Montreal–Boston, BMB is a randonnée bicycle event of approximately 1200 km
- Beattie McGuinness Bungay, a British advertising agency
- Bad Movie Beatdown, a web show about bad films
- Bear Mountain Bridge, suspension bridge over the Hudson River in the U.S. state of New York
- Briggs Motor Bodies, company, see Briggs Manufacturing Company
- Bright Minds Biosciences, a pharmaceutical company
- Bone marrow biopsy
- Bumba Airport IATA code
- Bhaag Milkha Bhaag, a 2013 Indian Hindi-language sports biographical film
