= Rusa =

Rusa is both a Malay and Indonesian word for deer. It may refer to:

- Rusa (genus), a genus of deer
- Any of four kings of Urartu, an Iron Age kingdom in what is now Turkey and Armenia
- Perodua Rusa, a microvan
- Rusa (grape), another name for the wine grape Gewürztraminer
- Typhoon Rusa, a powerful typhoon which struck South Korea in 2002
- Rusa language

RUSA may refer to:

- Randonneurs USA
- Rashtriya Uchchatar Shiksha Abhiyan, a higher education policy in India
- Reference and User Services Association of the American Library Association
- Rugby Union South Australia
- Rutgers University Student Assembly
