= Randonneurs USA =

- Sport: Randonneuring; Long-distance Cycling
- Jurisdiction: United States
- Abbreviation: RUSA
- Founded: 1998
- Affiliation: Audax Club Parisien
- President: Dave Thompson
- Vice president(s): Dawn Piech
- Director: Bill Bryant
- Secretary: Gardner Duvall
- Other key staff: Lois Springsteen (Treasurer)

Official website
- rusa.org
- (United States)

Randonneurs USA or RUSA is affiliated to Audax Club Parisien and coordinates and promotes the randonneuring style of cycling within the US. Many cycling events, or brevets, which are organized by local RUSA clubs in the United States are sanctioned by the Audax Club Parisien and therefore can be used to qualify for Paris–Brest–Paris and other long brevets around the world.

== History ==
RUSA was formed in 1998 by Jennifer Wise, Johnny Bertrand and John Wagner, along with six others.

First Members of the Randonneurs USA
Member #	Name	Home City
1	Jennifer Wise	Middletown, RI
2	Johnny Bertrand	Georgetown, KY
3	John Wagner	Seattle, WA
4	Dave Jordan	Arlington, MA
5	Sherry Reed	Columbus, OH
6	Charlie Henderson	Littleton, CO
7	Bill Bryant	Santa Cruz, CA
8	Lois Springsteen	Santa Cruz, CA
9	Pierce Gafgen	Middletown, RI

- Members from the first year (as of October 1998)

== RUSA specific events ==
In addition to the support for ACP events, RUSA offers several other events including RUSA-ONLY brevets. A very popular RUSA only event is the Permanent.

The Permanent is a members-only event where previously a member would contact an individual Permanent Owner to sign up to do the Permanent and then eventually ride the Permanent. By the beginning of 2021, for insurance purposes RUSA became the owner of Permanent routes, and members now register online to ride a route (immediately after registration, if desired). The Permanent can be used to help complete other RUSA ONLY awards such as the R-12 or RUSA Distance Awards.

A great way for a rider to get introduced to Randonneuring is by riding a Populaire, which is a shorter distance Brevet - 100-199 km in length. By doing so, newcomers get to know and learn about long distance rides style and rules of Randonneuring.

== Major brevets ==
The longest brevets organised by RUSA include:

- Cascade 1200 (Seattle International Randonneurs)
- Colorado High Country 1200 (Rocky Mountain Cycling Club)
- Cracker Swamp 1200 (Central Florida Randonneurs)
- Endless Mountains 1240K Randonnée (PA Randonneurs)
- Florida Sunshine 1200k (Central Florida Randonneurs)
- Gold Rush Randonnée (Davis Bike Club)
- Last Chance 1200k Randonnée (Rocky Mountain Cycling Club)
- Taste of Carolina (Bicycle for Life)
- Texas Rando Stampede (Lone Star Randonneurs)
