= Challenge riding =

Form of cycling

Challenge riding is a form of cycling where the riders challenge themselves rather than each other. Some challenge rides are charity events or pledge rides. Some are organised as pre- or early-season training events (sometimes in the UK called reliability trials). Others, often referred to as Randonnées, brevets or Audax events occur simply for the sake of the challenge; cyclosportive events allow cyclists to test themselves over challenging race routes used, for example L'Étape du Tour in the Tour de France. Most challenge rides are open to all comers, but a few require qualification to attend.

Challenge rides may be day rides of fixed distance (e.g. 50 km, 100 km, 100 miles) or multi-day trips that span a state, country or province, such as RAGBRAI in Iowa and the End to End in the United Kingdom.

== See also ==
- Audax
- Bicycle touring
- Brevet or Randonnée
- Century ride
- Cyclosportive
