= Boston–Montreal–Boston =

Randonnée bicycle event

Boston-Montreal-Boston (BMB) was as a 1200 km randonnée organized in 1988 by a group of cyclists living in the Greater Boston area. The ride started as an out-and-back course from Newton, Massachusetts, to Saint-Lambert, Quebec (suburbs of Boston and Montreal, respectively). Under ride organizer Jennifer Wise, the route was modified with a turnaround point at Huntingdon, Quebec, to avoid urban areas. It was held annually from 1988 through 2006 except for Paris–Brest–Paris years.

It was a noncompetitive endurance bike event.

Completing the BMB and the Rocky Mountain 1200km in the same year was recognized as the Can-Am Challenge of rendonneuring.
