= Bicycle Quarterly =

- Editor: Jan Heine
- Frequency: 4 issues annually
- Circulation: 4522 copies paid distribution per issue, 6600 copies printed
- Founded: 2002
- Company: Bicycle Quarterly Press
- Country: USA
- Based in: Seattle
- Language: English
- Website: http://www.bikequarterly.com

Bicycle Quarterly is a magazine examining the history of bicycles, their design and evolution, with emphasis on Randonneuring bicycles. Articles evaluate equipment and bicycles for performance and function, and include footnotes. The magazine was formerly known as Vintage Bicycle Quarterly.

== Overview ==
The magazine is published by Bicycle Quarterly Press and edited by Jan Heine, of Seattle, Washington in the United States. According to the group, "Randonneurs USA," Bicycle Quarterly is "a publication dedicated to classic lightweight bikes, particularly French ones such as Alex Singer and Rene Herse." In a 2009 article in Bicycle Times, Marie Autrey described Bicycle Quarterly as "Part anthropology journal, part engineering text."

Unlike most magazines, Bicycle Quarterly is financed by subscriptions, and includes only a few advertisements.

In Vol. 5, No. 1, Bicycle Quarterly published an article which dealt with the results of rolling resistance tests performed on tires. The results surprised many, including Lennard Zinn who published comments on the article in VeloNews including, "Notable is that rolling resistance is only a weak function of tire width." Heine summarized information about bicycle tires from articles of Bicycle Quarterly in an article published in Adventure Cyclist in March 2009.

In the third edition of his book, The Dancing Chain, Frank Berto discusses test results from Bicycle Quarterly articles in evaluating approximately twenty derailleurs.
