= Graham Woodrup =

Australian long-distance cyclist

Personal information
- Full name: Graham John Woodrup
- Nickname: Woody
- Born: 1946 Port Fairy
- Died: 17 February 1992 (aged 45–46)

Cycling career
- Sport: Cycling
- Discipline: Road
- Rider type: Endurance

Graham Woodrup was a competitive cyclist from Port Fairy who set many long-distance records including Perth to Sydney and the 24-hour tandem world record. He and his wife, Hester established the Murray to Moyne Cycle Relay in 1987 which is an annual charity ride. His life was cut short when hit by a car during a training ride.
