= Union des Audax =

The Union des Audax is the parent organization for the audax style of Randonneuring, a long-distance cycling sport.

The other form of randonneuring is the allure libre style.
