= Paris–Brest–Paris =

Long-distance cycling event

Paris-Brest-Paris
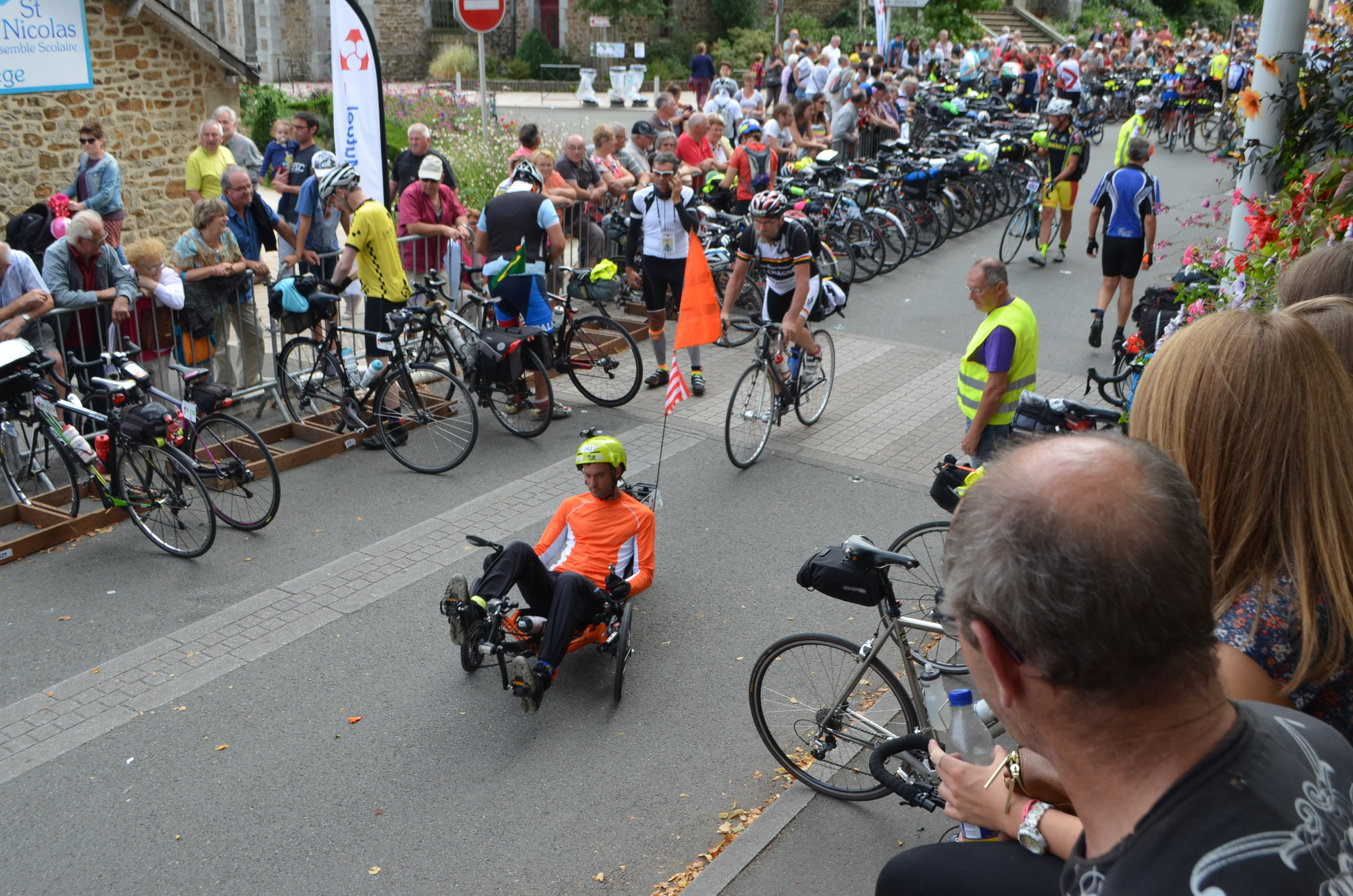
- Recumbent and upright riders at Villaines-la-Juhel in 2015.

Race details
- Region: France
- Nickname: PBP
- Type: Endurance Brevet Cycling Event
- Organiser: Audax Club Parisien
- Web site: www.paris-brest-paris.org

History
- First edition: 1891
- Editions: 7 (professional)
- Final edition: 1951
- First winner: Charles Terront (FRA)
- Final winner: Maurice Diot (FRA)

Paris–Brest–Paris (PBP) is a long-distance cycling event. It was originally a 1,200 km (750 mi) bicycle race in France from Paris to Brest and back to Paris in 1891. The last time it was run as a race was 1951. The most recent edition of PBP was held on 20 August 2023.

In 1931 amateur cyclists were separated from professionals. There are two independent long distance bicycle tours. One is the brevet (also called randonnée) organised by the Audax Club Parisien, in which cyclists ride individually. The goal is to make it within 90 hours, but with no competition. This event is held every four years. The other is an audax organised by the Union des Audax Françaises where cyclists ride in a group.

== The brevet ==
As in all brevet events, there is emphasis on self-sufficiency. Riders buy supplies anywhere along the course, but support by motorized vehicles is prohibited except at checkpoints. There is a 90-hour limit and the clock runs continuously. Many riders sleep as little as possible, sometimes catching a few minutes beside the road before continuing.

Participants must first complete a series of brevets (randonneuring events) within the same 12-month timeframe. For participants from most countries, the period coincides with the calendar year. The exception is riders from Oceania, for whom a different timeframe is used, to place the focus on events in the southern hemisphere summer. A series consists of 200 km, 300 km, 400 km and 600 km. Each can be replaced by a longer ride. Prior to 2007, the qualifying rides had to be completed from shortest to longest.

Where once PBP was contested by a few professionals as a demonstration of the bicycle's potential, today the focus is on the ordinary rider.

=== Controls ===
In 2015, the controls were in the following towns. All controls except for St Quentin and Brest are visited in both the westbound and eastbound directions.

- Saint-Quentin-en-Yvelines (start and finish)
- Dreux
- Mortagne-au-Perche
- Villaines-la-Juhel
- Fougères
- Tinténiac
- Quédillac
- Loudéac
- Saint-Nicolas-du-Pélem
- Carhaix-Plouguer
- Brest

The 2019 event started and ended at the National Sheepfold, Rambouillet and the 2023 event in front of the castle of Rambouillet.

== History ==
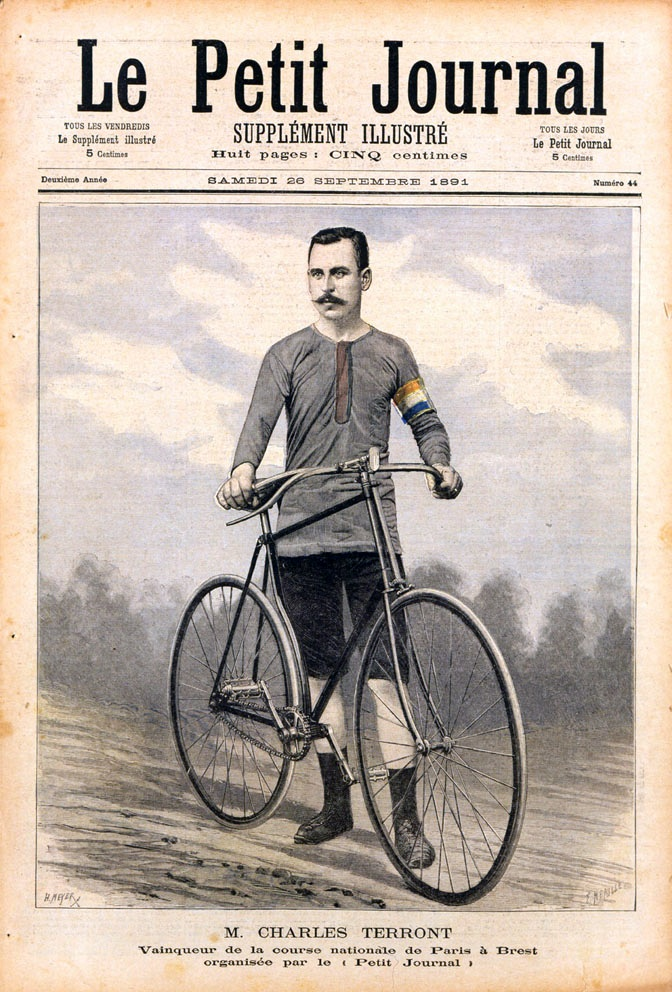
Charles Terront pictured on the front page of Le Petit Journal, 26 September 1891, after his victory.

Pierre Giffard of Le Petit Journal staged the first Paris-Brest et retour. Despite changes, Paris–Brest–Paris continues to this day as the oldest long-distance cycling road event.

=== 1891 ===
In an era when diamond safety frames and pneumatic tires were taking over from high-wheelers with solid rubber tires, Paris-Brest was an "épreuve," a test of the bicycle's reliability. Giffard promoted the event through editorials signed "Jean-sans-Terre." He wrote of self-sufficient riders carrying their own food and clothing. Riders would ride the same bicycle for the duration. Only Frenchmen were allowed to enter, and 207 participated.

The first (1891) Paris-Brest saw Michelin's Charles Terront and Dunlop's Jiel-Laval contest the lead. Terront prevailed, passing Jiel-Laval as he slept during the third night, to finish in 71 hours 22 minutes. Both had flats that took an hour to repair but enjoyed an advantage over riders on solid tires. Ultimately, 99 of the 207 finished.

The race was a coup for Le Petit Journal, bringing circulation increases. However, the logistics were daunting enough that organizers settled on a ten-year interval between editions.

==== 1891 Quadricycle ====
Perhaps the most unusual entrant was a petrol-powered Peugeot Type 3 Quadricycle, driven by Auguste Doriot and Louis Rigoulot. In order to publicly prove its reliability and performance Armand Peugeot had persuaded Pierre Giffard to have its progress certified by his network of monitors and marshals, the distance being about three times further than any road vehicle had travelled before. After a 3-day journey from Valentigny to Paris, they started immediately behind the bicycles. They covered 200 kilometres on the first day and 160 km on the second, but then lost 24 hours when a gear failed near Morlaix. After effecting a repair using local resources (a shoemaker's tools) they arrived at Brest after dark where they were received by a large crowd and the local Peugeot bicycle dealer.

For comparison, by the time Doriot and Rigoulot had reached Brest, Charles Terront and Jiel Laval had already returned to Paris. The next day they set off for Paris where they completed the trip 6 days after the cyclists. (Note: Le Petit Journal Paris, 12 September 1891 states: Le Petit Journal Paris, 12 September 1891. The National Race, Paris to Brest and return. Brest 11 September / Le Petit Journal Paris, 12 September 1891. La Course National de Paris a Brest et Retour. Brest 11 Septembre; The petrol/gasoline powered Peugeot Quadricycle which arrived the day before yesterday took 39 hours since leaving Paris, tomorrow it leaves for the capital. / Le Quadricycle à gazoline Peugeot, arrivé avant-hier de Paris en 39 heures, repart demain pour la capitale.) (Note: Le Petit Journal Paris, 11 September 1891 states: Le Petit Journal Paris, 11 September 1891. Arrival in Paris / Le Petit Journal Paris, 11 September 1891. ARRIVÉES À PARIS; We reveal that the third and last sections of the race have arrived in Paris. It goes without saying that this is a preliminary statement of fact. The final rankings will be confirmed in a few days, after the return and checking of our control books. We hope, however, that no serious objections will change each competitor's position in the final standings. They have valiantly conquered by leg power! 9 September: 1st MM Ch Terront, Bayonne, arrived at 6:37 in the morning, from Paris to Brest and back in 71 hours 37 minutes.; 2nd Jiel-Laval, Bordeaux, arrived at 3:04 pm, a total time of 80 hours 4 minutes. / Nous ouvrons aujourd'hui la troisième et dernière rubrique de la course: celle des arrivés à Paris. Il va de soi que ce n'est là qu'une mention, la constatation d'un fait. Pour que le classement soit definitif il faudra un délai de quelques jours, le retour de nos livres de contrôle, la vérification de diverses pièces. Nous espérons, toutefois, que pour chacun des concurrents nulle objection sérieuse, ne viendra modifier leur rang au classement final. Ils l'ont trop vaillamment conquis a la force du jarret! Journée du 9 Septembre; MM.: 1er Ch. Terront, de Bayonne, arrivé à 6 heures 37 minutes du matin, trajet de Paris à Brest, et retour en 71 heures 37 minutes.; 2e Jiel-Laval, de Bordeaux, arrivé à 3 heures 4 du soir, trajet en 80 heures 4 minutes) (Note: Le Petit Journal Paris, 16 September 1891 states: Le Petit Journal Paris, 16 September 1891. The National Race, Paris to Brest and return / Le Petit Journal Paris, 16 September 1891. La Course Nationale de Paris à Brest et Retour; The petrol/gazoline powered Quadricyle continued its superb journey. It arrived on Sunday evening at Vitré, Ille-et-Vilaine and left the next morning to Mortagne-au-Perche where it spent yesterday morning. It arrived in Paris yesterday evening at seven o'clock at the Porte Maillot. [15 September 1891] / Le Quadricyle à gazoline Peugeot à poursuivi brillament son voyage. Il est arrivé Dimanche soir à Vitré, et est parti le lendemain matin pour Mortagne ou il a passé hier matin. Il est arrivé hier soir à sept heures à la Porte Maillot.)

=== 1901 to 1951 ===
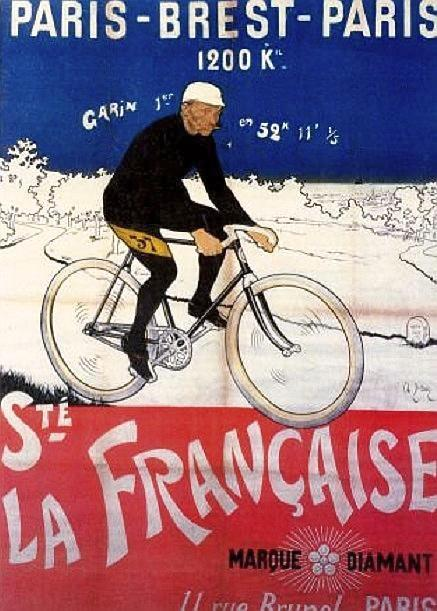
Poster advertising Paris-Brest, showing 1901 winner Maurice Garin

The 1901 Paris-Brest was sponsored not only by Le Petit Journal but L'Auto-Velo, edited by Henri Desgrange. For the first time, professionals were segregated from the "touriste-routier" group (in which a 65-year-old finished in just over 200 hours). The newspapers organized a telegraph system to relay results to their Paris presses, and the public followed the exploits of Maurice Garin, who won in just over 52 hours over 112 other professionals.

So many newspapers were sold that Géo Lefèvre at L'Auto suggested an even bigger race, the Tour de France. Under Henri Desgrange's leadership, the first Tour happened in 1903.

The 1911 event saw pack riding rather than solo breaks. Five riders stayed together until nearly the last control, Emile Georget finally pulling away from Ernest Paul to finish in 50 hours and 13 minutes.

The 1921 event, following World War I, was small, with 43 professionals and 65 touriste-routiers. It was fought between Eugène Christophe and Lucien Mottiat, Mottiat finally prevailing in 55 hours 7 minutes.

In 1931, there was a change in the regulations. Proposed by André Griffe (president of the Union des Audax Cyclistes Parisiens), Desgrange (president of l'Auto) replaced the touriste-routier group by an Audax, where cyclists rode in groups of 10 at an average 20kmh (22.5kmh since 1961).

Many people disliked that change. So Camille Durand (president of the Audax Club Parisien, ACP) organised another PBP at the same time on the same road. Cyclists could ride individually (French allure libre) and there was a limit of 96 hours. 57 participated, among them two women, a tandem with two men, four mixed tandems and a triplet.

The 1931 professional event saw victory by Australian Hubert Opperman with a sprint on the finish velodrome after his long solo breakaway was neutralized just outside Paris. Opperman's finishing time was a record 49 hours 21 minutes, despite constant rain. His diet included 12 pounds of celery, which he thought an important energy source (celery's energy content is minuscule, but it may have been a source of fluid and salt).

Owing to World War II, the 1941 PBP was postponed to 1948, when L'Equipe sponsored the event. Of 52 pros, Albert Hendrickx proved strongest, winning in a sprint over fellow Belgian François Neuville.

Three years later, the 1951 event saw Maurice Diot win in a record time of 38 hours 55 minutes. It is the last time PBP has been raced by professionals and from then on the course used smaller roads and more hills. Diot won a sprint over breakaway companion Eduoard Muller after waiting for Muller to fix a puncture in Trappes, 22 km from the finish.

=== 1956 to present: amateur event ===
Though listed on the professional calendar in 1956 and 1961, too few racers signed up to make the event happen. Nonetheless, hundreds of randonneurs turned out. And the randonneur division even featured racing, René Herse-sponsored Roger Baumann winning over Lheuillier in 52 hours 19 minutes.

PBP was held every five years between 1956 and 1975, with more participants and less media coverage. From 1948 until the 1980s, the randonneur event included a "Challenge des Constructeurs" for the bicycle maker with the three best-placed riders. René Herse won this "Challenge" every time from 1948 until 1971, and again in 1975. No other builder won the "Challenge" more than once.

The Belgian former professional Herman de Munck came 5th in 66, first in 71, 75, 79 and 83. He was disqualified in 79, most believe unfairly. De Munck continues to place highly, finishing the 1999 PBP 109th place at the age of 60.

The randonneur Paris–Brest–Paris has always allowed women to participate. In 1975, Chantal de la Cruz and Nicole Chabriand lowered the women's time to 57 hours. In 1979, Suzy de Carvalho finished in 57h02m.

American Scott Dickson came third in 1979, though at just less than 49 hours he was four hours behind the winners. In 1983 he again came third, this time by only one hour. He won his first PBP in 1987 by breaking away in Brest, aided by a tailwind and a few strong riders from the "touring" group, which that year started many hours before the "racing" group. Dickson also won in 1991 and in 1995.

Susan Notorangelo set a women's record of 54 hours 40 minutes in 1983, this was bettered in 1995 when by Brigitte Kerlouet 44 hours 14 minutes. American Melinda Lyon finished as first woman in 1999 and 2003. In 2007 the first woman was Christiane Thibault, and in 2011 it was Isabelle Esclangon, both from France.

The 2007 Paris–Brest–Paris was the first poor weather event since 1987. It was the worst weather PBP riders had faced since 1956. 30.2% failed to finish.

== Time limits ==
There are three groups of riders:

- The vedettes ("stars") are elite riders and have a time limit of 80 hours, although some will complete the ride considerably faster. The vedettes are first to depart on the Sunday afternoon.
- The touristes are the largest group and have a time limit of 90 hours, departing in waves on the Sunday evening.
- The randonneurs are a smaller group and have a time limit of 84 hours (representing the minimum average speed of 14.3 km/h). This group departs early on the Monday morning.

== Winners ==
Although the History of PBP website mentions that PBP started as a race, according to the official PBP website "the organizers strongly feel that PBP is not a race".

This is an extremely important aspect of randonneuring, where "riders aim to complete the course within specified time limits, and receive equal recognition regardless of their finishing order." So there is no actual "winner," but a "first finisher."

=== Professional era ===
Year	First	Team	Time	Second	Third
1891	(France) Charles Terront	Bayonne	71 hours 22 minutes	(France) Pierre Jiel-Laval	(France) Henri Coullibeuf
1901	(France) Maurice Garin	La Française	52 hours plus	(France) Gaston Rivierre	(France) Hippolyte Aucouturier
1911	(France) Émile Georget	Coureur de vitesse	50 hours 13 minutes.	(France) Octave Lapize	(France) Ernest Paul
1921	(Belgium) Louis Mottiat	Coureur de vitesse	55 hours 7 minutes	(France) Eugène Christophe	(Belgium) Émile Masson senior
1931	(Australia) Hubert Opperman	Alleluia-Wolber	49 hours 21 minutes	(Belgium) Léon Louyet	(Italy) Giuseppe Pancera
1948	(Belgium) Albert Hendrickx	Independent	41 hours 36 mins 42 secs	(Belgium) François Neuville	(Italy) Mario Fazio
1951	(France) Maurice Diot	Mercier - Hutchinson	38 hours 55 minutes.	(France) Édouard Muller	(Belgium) Marcel Hendrickx

=== Amateur era ===
Year	Rider	Time
1931	(France) Alexis Cottard	68h 30'
1948	(France) Jo Routens	49h 20'
1951	(France) Jo Routens	47h 54'
1956	(France) Jo Routens	50h 29'
1961	(France) Jean Fouace	46h 18'
1966	(France) Robert Demilly & Maurice Macaudiere	44h 21'
1971	(Belgium) Herman De Munck	45h 39'
1975	(France) Yves Cohen	43h 27'
1979	(France) Pierre Baleydier	44h 01'
1983	(Belgium) Herman De Munck	43h 24'
1987	(United States) Scott Dickson	44h 05'
1991	(United States) Scott Dickson	43h 42'
1995	(United States) Scott Dickson	43h 20'
1999	(France) Philippe Deplaix and (France) Christophe Bocquet	44h 22'
2003	(Belgium) Marc Leuckx and (France) 5 Frenchmen	42h 40'
2007	(France) Michel Mingant	44h 33'
2011	(France) Christophe Bocquet	44h 13'
2015	(Germany) Björn Lenhard	42h 26'
2019	(Germany) Hajo Eckstein	43h 49'
2023	(United States) Nicolas De Haan	41h 46'

== Pastry ==
The Paris–Brest, a French dessert made of choux pastry and a praline flavoured cream, with a circular shape representative of a tyre or wheel, was reportedly created in 1891 to commemorate the race. It became popular with participants, partly because of its energy-giving high caloric value, and is now found in pâtisseries all over France.
