= Audax Club Parisien =

French cycling club

- Short name: ACP
- Sport: Cyclotourism, long-distance cycling, randonneuring
- Founded: 1904
- League: Fédération Française de Cyclotourisme, FFCT
- Based in: Paris, France
- President: Luc Coppin

The Audax Club Parisien (ACP) is a French Cyclist Touring Club. It is a non-profit voluntary association formed in Paris in 1904. It organizes long-distance rides in France. The most popular event is the Paris-Brest-Paris Randonneur, held every four years. The Audax Club Parisien is also the international reference for randonneuring and works with other randonneuring organizations worldwide through the international association Les Randonneurs Mondiaux (LRM).

== History ==
=== April 1904 – Creation of the Brevets Audax Cyclistes ===
In April 1904, Henri Desgrange, the editor of the French daily sports paper L’Auto, organized a 200 km Brevet from Paris to Gaillon and back, in groups led by so-called road captains in charge of maintaining an average of 18 km/h. He was inspired by Italian cyclists who attempted in June 1897 the challenge of cycling from Rome to Naples, a distance of 230 km, during daylight hours. The Italians had called their event Audax, which means, in Latin, audacious (daring), and Desgrange adopted the name.

=== 30 November 1904 – Foundation of the Audax Club Parisien ===
The non-profit voluntary association Audax Club Parisien is formed by a group of friends, some of whom had ridden the Brevets Audax. The purpose of the association is "to encourage the development of long-distance bicycle touring, to educate cyclists, to turn them into ardent bicycle tourists and confirmed randonneurs, and to organize excursions". The ACP registered office is located at Café du Vaudeville, 29 rue Vivienne, Paris. The birth of the club was announced in the Official Journal of the French Republic on 28 December 1904.

=== 1906 – Organization of the Brevets Audax ===
In 1906, Henri Desgrange entrusted the ACP with the organization of the Brevets Audax. The club then contributed for fifteen years to the prosperity of these Brevets.

=== 1921 – The Split ===
In 1921, two reasons are leading Henri Desgrange to withdraw the organization of the Brevets Audax from the ACP. First, when organizing the Polymultipliée de Chanteloup (a climb race, see below), the ACP forms a partnership with the paper L'Echo des Sports, a rival to Desgrange's 'L'Auto. The second reason is that the ACP road captains are accused of not having observed the 18 km/h required average during a Brevet Audax run on 10 April 1910. Following this, some road captains leave the ACP and form the Union des Audax Clubs Parisiens, known today as Union des Audax Français. That is the body that Desgrange begins to favour, entrusting them with the organization of the Brevets Audax (on which the pace is set by road captains; those brevets are still organized today by the UAF). In response, the ACP creates the Brevets de Randonneur Français à allure libre (free-paced brevets). Riders are free to go as fast or as slow as they want, so long as they stay within the time limit of the brevet (14 km/h). Since that time, the Audax Club Parisien homologated and recorded every free-paced brevet ridden around the world according to their regulation. The 1,000,000th brevet was homologated in 2017.

=== 1923 – Birth of the Fédération Française des Sociétés de Cyclotourisme (FFSC) ===
8 December 1923 marks the birth of the Fédération Française des Sociétés de Cyclotourisme (French Federation of Cycling touring Societies, FFSC), that would become the Fédération Française de Cyclotourisme (FFCT) in 1942. The Audax Club Parisien is one of the founding members of the Federation, with les Francs Routiers, le Cycle Excursionniste Parisien, le Touriste Club Parisien, and les Tandémistes Parisiens. Gaston Clément, then member of the ACP, is the first President of this new federation.

=== 1963 – The Merger ===
At the beginning of the 1960s, French bicycle touring is in decline and two long-distance organizing clubs are at the lowest ebb : the Audax Club Parisien and the Vélo-Club Courbevoie-Asnières (VCCA). Jean Dejeans, president of the ACP, meets Gilbert Bulté, president of the VCCA, and proposes a merger of the two clubs. A few members present since the beginning and others, who returned on this occasion, will then join forces to bring the ACP back to the status of a leading club in bicycle tourism. Robert and Suzanne Lepertel are part of the VCCA members who came to strengthen the ACP. Gilbert Bulté is appointed President of the Audax Club Parisien.

=== Today ===
The recovery of the ACP is due to the work of a great leader, Robert "Bob" Lepertel supported by his wife Suzanne. The Paris-Brest-Paris of 1971, headed by Bob, is the first milestone of that renewal. The club membership and their organizations keep growing. The Brevets de Randonneurs become Européens, then Mondiaux, allowing foreign randonneurs to organize qualifying brevets in their countries. When Bob passes the baton, the foundations are solid, and the ACP known throughout the world. Marie-Thérèse Martin succeeded him, followed by Jean-Claude Massé. The latter creates the PBP Commission and organizes the PBP Centenary (1991). After him, the presidency was taken over by Claude Aubague and then, for thirteen years, by Pierre "Pierrot" Théobald. Despite the magnitude of the task, they maintain a dynamic association. Many activities are offered to the club members: Flèches de France in groups, Easter meetings in Provence, excursions across France, gatherings at Epiphany, gentleman's rides, pancake parties, etc. At the same time, the club becomes an even bigger organizer. The international participation in the brevets and in PBP keeps growing. The ACP members reach the limits of what a group of volunteers can do on their own. After the brief presidency of Thierry Miton, the new President Thierry Rivet works to delegate some tasks, and allows the ACP to take up the challenge of welcoming every four years more than 6,000 participants from the whole world in the Paris-Brest-Paris Randonneur. Today young cyclists joined the ACP and the new president, Luc Coppin, intends to negotiate the transition to the digital age while maintaining longtime values: sport, friendship, tourism, and long-distance riding.

== Main Organizations ==
=== Brevet Randonneurs Mondiaux (BRM) ===
BRMs are non-competitive, unsupported long-distance cycling events organized worldwide according to the ACP regulations. Only the ACP has sanctioning authority for BRMs. There are five distances: 200 km, 300 km, 400 km, 600 km and 1000 km. The time limits are respectively: 13 hours 30 minutes, 20 hours, 27 hours, 40 hours and 75 hours. The brevets are self-paced: participants are free to ride as fast or as slow as they want, so long as they stay within the time limit of the brevet. All brevets have checkpoints with opening and closing time, where the rider's personal brevet card must be signed and stamped. No follow car is permitted on the brevets, except at the checkpoints. Night riding is usual. The brevets can be used as qualifiers for Paris-Brest-Paris or for 1200 km + events homologated by Les Randonneurs Mondiaux.

On 11 September 1921, the ACP organized the first Brevet de Randonneur à Allure Libre, allure libre meaning self-paced. The minimum average was 14 km/h. In 1931, having ridden a 300 km brevet was mandatory to enter the first Paris-Brest-Paris Randonneur. Later, the 400, then the 600 also became mandatory, and in 1979, all the entrants were required to have completed a Super Randonneur series (200, 300, 400 and 600 km) in the year of PBP. The organization was extended to Europe in 1976 and to the whole world in 1983, at the instigation of Robert Lepertel. It was then named Brevets Randonneurs Mondiaux (BRM). This allowed foreign randonneurs to organize qualifying brevets in their countries. Today, the multiple brevets run around the world are not only qualifiers for longer events, but also the usual way to enjoy long-distance riding.

=== Paris–Brest–Paris ===
The Paris-Brest-Paris Randonneur (commonly called PBP) is a 1,200 km randonnée taking place every four years. The race began in 1891. Cyclists try to complete the race in under 90 hours. Today, it welcomes more than 7,000 riders coming from all over the world. In 1931, on the occasion of the fifth edition of the professional race Paris-Brest et Retour, Camille Durand, President of the ACP, created a free-paced randonneuring event of 1,200 km. Two deadlines are defined: 60 hours and 96 hours. 62 participants took the start, 44 finished. The time limit was reduced to 90 hours in 1966. Due to World War II, the second edition of the PBP Randonneur did not take place until 1948. The event is organized every five years until 1971, and from 1975, every 4 years. The progression of foreign participants has been constant since 1971. In 2003, their number exceeded that of the French riders. They are twice as numerous in 2015, and three times in 2019.

=== Flèche Vélocio ===
The Flèche Vélocio is a French team ride of 24-hour duration, usually held over the Easter weekend. Teams consist of 3 to 5 bikes, all members ride together. Each team chooses its own start point and its own route. Teams start on Good Friday or on early Saturday, and head to the traditional Easter Meeting in Provence. At least 360 km must be covered in 24 hours, but the goal is to ride the longest distance possible. After the Flèche, the team members join the meeting and hand their cards over to the ACP official. Support vehicles are not allowed, except for refueling at determined checkpoints (in early times, those were limited to 3).

The Flèche Vélocio was created in 1947 as a tribute to Paul de Vivie (alias Vélocio), who used to ride from Saint-Etienne to Provence at Easter (a distance of about 400 km). The event was tested by a team of 4 ACP members, who started on Friday 4 April 1947 at 6 p.m. from Notre-Dame de Paris to reach the Easter Meeting in Provence. After 24 hour of riding, they reached Limonest, having completed 462 km without any support. Early Sunday morning, they joined the meeting, which was held in Grignan.

The Flèche Vélocio was opened for registration in 1948. First organized by a group of ACP-members, the event was managed by René Martinez from 1959 to 1963, by Claude Aubague from 1964 to 1995, and by Michèle Hugon since 1996. Until 1983, the minimal distance to cover was 350 km. The participation was modest for over 20 years, peaking at 26 teams. From 1976, the Flèche Vélocio has grown significantly with teams starting from all over France. In 1984, 216 teams took part. The distance record is 778 km, held since 1995 by the cycling club US Métro (the only club to have participated in all editions of the event since 1948).

==== Fléchette Vélocio ====
The Fléchette Vélocio (fléchette means little arrow, dart) was tested by a team of ACP-members in 1987 and opened for registration in 1988. The goal is to make young people discover and enjoy long-distance riding in a team. The Fléchette is a 12-hour team ride towards the Easter Meeting in Provence. The team must ride from 150 km to 250 km. Night riding is not mandatory, and should not exceed one hour. Each team has a maximum of 5 participants, including 4 young people aged 14 to 18 (14 to 20 since 2004) and one adult having already completed a Flèche Vélocio, or holding an instructor diploma delivered by the FFCT.

==== Flèches Nationales ====
The Flèches Nationales are organized according to the regulations of the Flèche Vélocio, but with a meeting place located elsewhere than in Provence, either in France or in other countries. In France, the event was first called Flèche Pascale (since 1982). Traditionally, the destination is the Easter meeting in Quercy, but any organizer can suggest another place. In other countries, the first Flèche Nationale events were born in 1985 (Canada, Australia). Their development was increased by the presence of the Flèche Nationale in the list of qualifying events for the Randonneur 5000. Suzanne Lepertel ensured their management until her death in 2014. Valéry Rochard took over (2015–2016), then Sophie Matter. In 2021, there are 37 organizing countries.

==== Traces Vélocio ====
The Traces Vélocio are a team event run parallel to the Flèche Vélocio (see above), on a shorter distance and with a possible overnight stop. Each team has 2 to 6 bikes, usually starting on Easter Saturday from a location of their choice. The minimum distance to cover is 200 km, the maximum 360 km. The Traces are approved on Sunday morning by the ACP official at the Easter meeting in Provence. The Traces Vélocio were created in 1996 by the French Federation of Cyclotourism (FFCT), to celebrate the 90th anniversary of the Easter Meeting in Provence. Traces (plural form) means tracks as well as footprints. Representing all routes chosen by the different teams, the Traces may also suggest that today's riders follow in Vélocio's footprints. In 1999, the organization of the Traces Vélocio was transferred to the ACP. At the beginning, an overnight stop had to be observed between 10 p.m. and 6 a.m. The initial purpose of the Trace is to ride a tourist route in daytime hours. In January 2018, the overnight stop became optional.

==== Traces Nationales ====
The Traces Nationales are organized according to the regulations of the Traces Vélocio, but with a meeting place located elsewhere than in Provence, either in France or in other countries. Usually they are organized together with the Flèche. In France, the event was born in 2009 at the Easter meeting in Quercy. It was first called Traces Pascales. In other countries, the first Traces Nationales were born in 2010 (Canada). In 2021, there are 8 organizing countries.

=== Flèches de France ===
The Flèches de France are permanent rides, not team events like the Flèche Vélocio. There are 20 routes, each one connecting Paris with some city on border of France. They can be ridden in both ways. The route distances range from 189 to 993 km. Participants can ride a Flèche de France either as a Tourist (minimum of 80 km per day) or as a Randonneur. The Randonneur option is divided in 2 levels, Silver and Gold. The minimum average to be achieved on the Flèche depends on the route distance and on the target level (e. g. from 100 to 250 km : 20 km/h for the Silver and 25 km/h for the Gold; from 851 to 1000 km: 15 km/h for the Silver and 20 km/h for the Gold). Self-sufficiency is not mandatory. From the shortest (Paris-Dieppe) to the longest (Paris-Perpignan), all routes offer special scenery and challenge. A trophy is offered to the riders who have completed the 20 Flèches (i. e. 11,000 km). The Flèches de France were created in 1954 by Robert Lepertel and his former cycling club, the Vélo-Club Courbevoie-Asnières (VCCA). The routes were set up by Gilbert Dauvergne. They became ACP events in 1963, when the two clubs merged. In 1988, each Flèche was given an alternative route on smaller, tourism-oriented roads. The alternative routes were called Flèches Touristiques. The old routes, named Flèches Classiques, were suppressed in 2012. For those who had ridden the 20 Flèches, a 21st Flèche connecting Viroflay to Autrans was proposed from 1986 to 2018. This special route had been created by Roger and Marie-Thérèse Martin. Flèches de France have been very popular since 1954 (today, 45,000 Flèches have been ridden, representing 18 millions km).

=== Relais de France ===
The Relais de France are permanent rides, connecting 20 different cities located on border of France. These cities are the same as the cities connected to Paris on the Flèches de France. The routes can be ridden in both ways. For information (as each participant can choose their own itinerary), the route distances range from 124 to 568 km. A minimum of 80 km per day must be ridden. A trophy is offered to the riders who have completed the 20 Relais de France. The Relais de France were created in 1978 by the cycling club Union Sportive de Créteil, with Roger Baumann as organizer. In 2012, the Union Sportive de Créteil abandoned this organization. Being perfectly complementary to the Flèches de France, the Relais de France were taken over in 2013 by the ACP. Jean-Pierre Pendu ensured the management by adapting the regulations and the routes.

=== Super Randonnées ===
The Super Randonnées were created in 2009 by the Audax Club Parisien, on a proposal from Sophie Matter, who has been in charge of this organization since the beginning. Super Randonnées are mountainous permanents of 600 km (373 miles) with over 10.000 m (32.800 ft) of elevation gain. Participants have the option of riding the Super Randonnée either as a Randonneur (60 hour time limit) or as a Tourist (average of 75 km minimum per day). Self-reliance is part of the challenge. Participants must do the ride without the support of a vehicle. They take a photo of their bicycle at the control places designated by the organizer. Super Randonnées use famous as well as unknown passes and summits, with amazing scenery. Nine routes are offered in France, and 112 in other countries (figures for 2020). A trophy is offered to the riders who have completed 10 Super Randonnées. In December 2021, the cycling association Provence Randonneurs, chaired by Sophie Matter, takes over from the Audax Club Parisien at the head of the Super Randonnées. From 2022, the Super Randonnées are organized, verified and validated by Provence Randonneurs.

=== Tour de Corse ===
The Tour de Corse is a permanent route of about 1000 km and 16,700 m elevation gain around Corsica. The proposed route can be ridden in both ways and can be modified at the convenience of each one, only passing through the 16 designated controls being compulsory. There is no time limit to complete the tour, nor self-sufficiency rule to observe. The Tour de Corse is born as a complement to the Flèches de France (see above). As it was not possible (Corsica being an island) to offer a Flèche de France connecting Paris to Ajaccio or to Bastia, the Vélo-Club Courbevoie-Asnières (VCCA) and Gilbert Dauvergne created the Tour de Corse in 1956. When the two clubs merged in 1963, the Tour de Corse was taken over by the ACP. The Tour de Corse was labelled by the French Cyclotourism Federation in 1995.

=== Awards ===
==== Randonneur 5000 ====
The Randonneur 5000 award was created in 1961 for riders who completed a distance of at least 5,000 km on the various long-distance events organized and / or promoted by the ACP. The rider must complete a full series of 200, 300, 400, 600, and 1000 km brevets, a Paris-Brest-Paris Randonneur, a Flèche Vélocio or Flèche Nationale, and the remaining distances ridden on others ACP-approved events for a total of at least 5000 km.

==== Randonneur 10000 ====
The Randonneur 10000 award was created in 2011 for riders who completed a distance of at least 10,000 km on the various long-distance events organized and / or promoted by the ACP. The rider must complete two full series of 200, 300, 400, 600, and 1000 km brevets, a Paris-Brest-Paris Randonneur, another 1200 km + event homologated by Les Randonneurs Mondiaux, a Flèche Vélocio or Flèche Nationale, a Super Randonnée (in the Rando option), and the remaining distances ridden on others ACP-approved events for a total of at least 10,000 km. The events used to apply for the Randonneur 5000 can be used to apply for the Randonneur 10000.

== Former Organizations ==
The events listed below are still belonging to the ACP, but they are no longer organized.

=== Raids ===
In addition to the Brevets Audax held until 1921, the club also organized raids of 300 and 400 km. From 1914, these raids were no longer controlled by road captains. The participants were free to ride alone and pace themselves, their only obligation being to validate the various fixed or secret controls.

=== Polymultipliée de Chanteloup ===
In 1913 and 1914, then from 1921, the ACP supported the organization of the Polymultipliée de Chanteloup, a single-day bicycle race on a 10 km long circuit located in Chanteloup-les-Vignes, also called Trophée des Grimpeurs (climber's trophy). The circuit included a very hard climb, and the word polymultipliée refers to the fact that the initial purpose of the race was to highlight the usefulness of derailleur and low gear. This championship later became the Brevet de Grimpeur de Chanteloup (Chanteloup climber's brevet). Competitors had to complete 10 laps of the circuit in 5 hours maximum. Their card had to be stamped on each lap, and walking was prohibited.

=== Critérium d'Hiver Parisien and Critérium des Cyclotouristes ===
During the interwar period, the ACP was the most important club in Paris and surroundings. At the end of the 1930s, always ahead of time, the club created two new organizations that were very successful after World War II. First, the Critérium d'Hiver Parisien (Parisian Winter Criterium) consisted of riding alone a route in Paris or the very close suburbs, reaching briefly indicated control places, and answering a questionnaire which riders received at the start and handed in at the finish. The classification was made according to the real time taken to complete the circuit, possibly increased by the penalties granted for incorrect answer or no answer. Second, the Critérium des Cyclotouristes (Cyclotourists' Criterium), created in 1937, was a summer event of about 90 km, run on all passable terrain, with a minimum average of 15 km/h. The participants left separately and were possibly dispersed at each control, each being thus obliged to read the map in order to find the next control which was briefly indicated. It was neither a race nor a brevet, but a fun event, at the same time touristic (since often off the beaten track), sportive (pure speed did not count, but a minimum of physical condition was required), and technical (participants being left to themselves from the start, they had to know how to find their way and repair their bikes).

=== Journée Vélocio Parisienne ===
The Journée Vélocio Parisienne (named later Matinée Vélocio) is a meeting day for promoting bicycle touring (and touring bicycles), which includes an individual time trial with hill climb. It was one of the flagship organizations of the ACP. The first edition took place in 1924, in Côte de la Madeleine (Vallée de Chevreuse). In 1925 it was organized in Côte de la Jonchère (Bougival) and, from 1926, it took place in Côte de la Barbannerie (Maurecourt), then in Côte de Jouy-le-Moutier. Canceled in 1980 by lack of authorization, it moved in 1981 and 1982 to Côte des Princes (Val-d'Oise). It then disappeared from the calendar of the French Bicycle Touring Federation, because it was a racing event. The ACP tried to save it by organizing under the aegis of another French cycling federation, the UFOLEP and, from 1983, on the road circuit of Autodrome de Montlhéry. The event was finally abandoned in 1988.

=== Brevet de Grimpeur T.A. ===
Spécialités T.A. is a French equipment manufacturer of aluminum chainrings and cranksets. The creation of the Brevet de Grimpeur T.A. (T.A. Climber's Brevet) was the logical continuation of the Chanteloup's climber's trophy (see above), which could no longer take place on the Chanteloup circuit. Also called Matinée T.A., the Brevet de Grimpeur T.A. was organized in 1962 and 1963 by the Vélo-Club Courbevoie-Asnières. The ACP took over in 1964, after the merger of the two clubs. The 5-hour time limit was maintained, but riders were no more ranked. The only old rule kept was that bikes had to be equipped with front and rear mudguards. This brevet was extended to the whole of France in 1975, one year after the creation of the Super Brevet de Grimpeur T.A. (for those who had ridden successfully the Brevet de Grimpeur T.A). The Super Brevet was intended to be a sort of national grand finale, a bicycle party. It was organized for 5 years in Verdigny on a particularly difficult course, then passed through Neufchâtel-en-Bray and Trucy. The last edition took place in 1987.

=== Challenge National George-Navet ===
George Navet is the founder of Spécialités T.A. (see above). The national challenge George-Navet was created in 1980 by the ACP under the auspices of the French Federation of Bicycle Touring, and organized until 1992. It was intended to promote long-distance cycling. Each year, 60 events of at least 200 km were selected. The challenge was open to all cyclist touring clubs in France. The organizing clubs proposed their routes and sent the results to the ACP each year. Being part of the challenge ensured the organizers some publicity.

=== Gentlemen Parisiens ===
The Gentlemen Parisiens were organized for the first time in 1965 on the circuit of La Malnoue in Croissy-Beaubourg. It was a team time trial with two members per team and time adjustments according to age. The time was taken on the second team member (the older of the two men, or the woman in the case of a mixed team). For every month over the age of 40 for men (or the age of 35 for women), one second was subtracted from the actual time. From 1981, the French Federation of Bicycle Touring being no longer allowed to oversee any competitive event, the ACP organized the Gentlemen Parisiens under the aegis of another French cycling federation, the UFOLEP, until 2010. The editions took place successively in Le Plessis-aux-Bois, on the road circuit of Autodrome de Montlhéry (from 1982), and in the forest of Rambouillet, near Poigny-la-Forêt (from 1995).

== Presidents of the Audax Club Parisien ==
Year	Name	Year	Name
1904	Armand Le RENDU	1946 – 1950	Jean DEJEANS
1909–1910	Louis ROUDAIRE	1951	Alfred GADECEAU
1911 – 1912	Fernand FAUVEAU	1952	Lucien VIRGILE
1913 – 1914	Paul LECLERCQ	1953 – 1956	René MARTINEZ
1915 – 1916	Henri de COPPET	1957 – 1962	Jacques PASSAYS
1917 – 1918	Maurice MAITRE	1963	Jean DEJEANS
1919 – 1922	Armand DUBRAY	1964 – 1971	Gilbert BULTE
1923 – 1924	Gaston LECLERE	1972 – 1983	Robert LEPERTEL
1925 – 1926	Maurice MAITRE	1984	Marie-Thérèse MARTIN
1927 – 1931	Camille DURAND	1985-1991	Jean-Claude MASSE
1932 – 1934	Adolphe DESCUBES	1991 – 1995	Claude AUBAGUE
1935 – 1937	Paul PANGAUD	1996 – 2008	Pierre THEOBALD
1938 – 1942	René SAMSON	2009-2010	Thierry MITON
1943 – 1945	Pierre MOLINIER	2010 (5 month interim)	Jean-Gualbert FABUREL
1946	Pierre MOLINIER	2011 – 2019	Thierry RIVET
1946	Henri CONTENT	2020	Luc COPPIN
