= Audax (cycling) =

Long-distance cycling sport

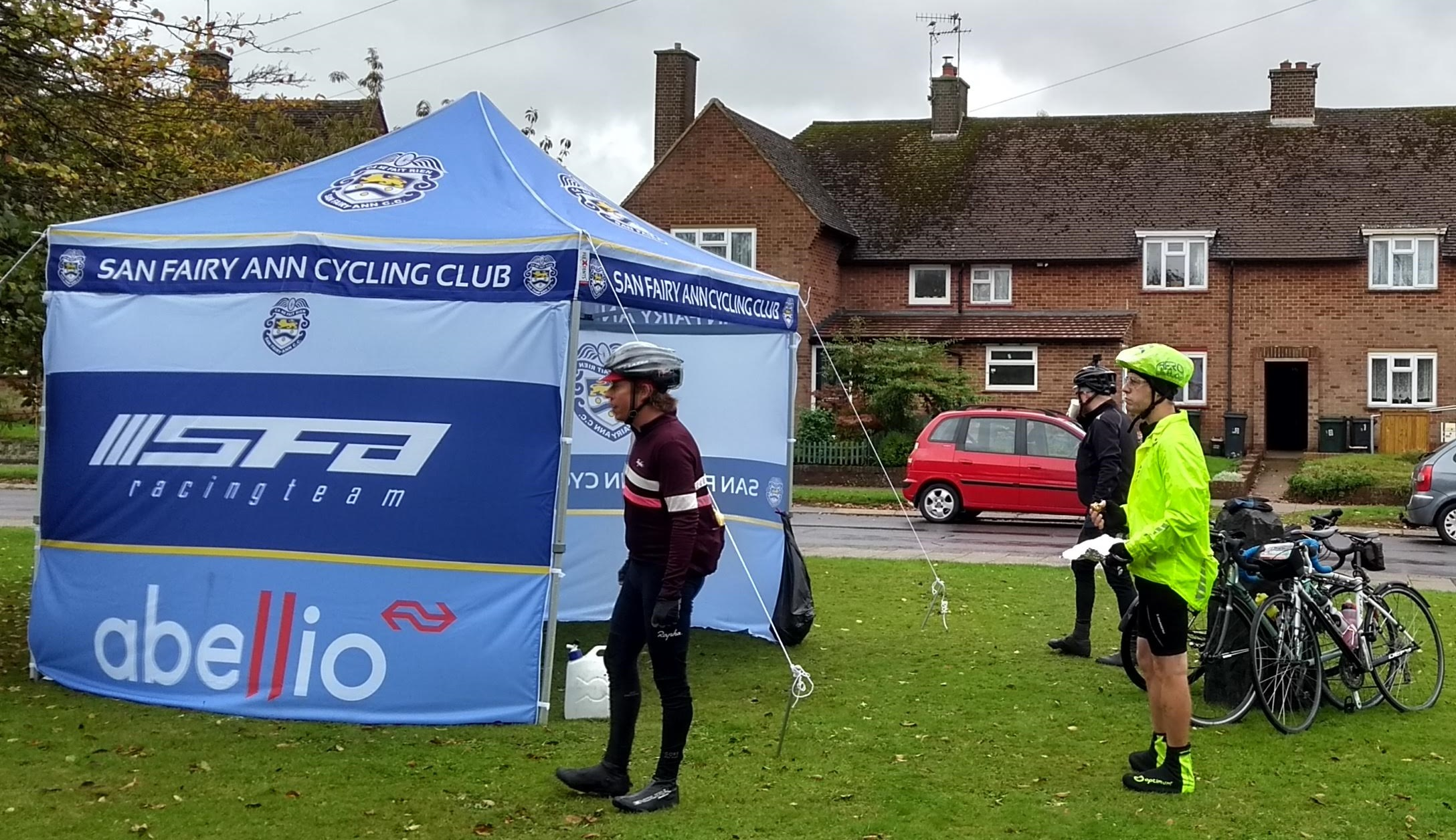
An Audax control point at a ride in the United Kingdom

Audax is a cycling sport in which participants attempt to cycle long distances within a pre-defined time limit. Audax is a non-competitive sport: success in an event is measured by its completion. Audax has its origins in Italian endurance sports of the late nineteenth century, and the rules were formalised in France in the early twentieth century.

In the present day, there are two forms of Audax: the original group-riding style, Euraudax, governed by Unions des Audax, and the free-paced (allure libre) style usually known as Randonneuring, governed by Audax Club Parisien. The original form is mostly popular in France, but also in the Netherlands, Belgium and Germany. Randonneuring is popular in many countries including Malaysia, France, Great Britain, Singapore, Australia, Canada, the USA and China.

In late nineteenth-century Italy, day-long "challenge" sports became popular. Participants aimed to cover as much distance as possible and prove themselves audax ("audacious"). The first recorded audax cycling event took place on June 12, 1897, when twelve Italian cyclists attempted the challenge of cycling from Rome to Naples, a distance of 230 km, during daylight hours. Similar events became popular elsewhere, and in 1904 French journalist Henri Desgrange produced Audax regulations, which belonged to his Auto newspaper.

Under the Audax regulations, riders rode as a group. Successful riders were awarded a certificate called a Brevet d'Audax. A group of successful audax cyclists formed the Audax Club Parisien (ACP), which took over the organisation of Audax events on Desgrange's behalf. In 1920, there was a disagreement between Desgrange and the ACP. Desgrange withdrew ACP's permission to organise events under his Audax regulations, and ACP created its own allure libre (free-paced) version of the sport, where successful riders were awarded certificates called Brevets des Randonneurs. Desgrange continued to promote the original Audax rules, and on July 14, 1921, the Union of Parisian Audax Cyclistes (UACP) was formed, which became the Union of French Audax in January 1956.

== Euraudax ==
Participants in the original form of audax ride in a group, at a steady pace set by a road captain. The group aims to cycle at 22.5 km/h between stops. The route is planned with designated stopping points. In longer audax events the group may ride between 16 and 20 hours in a day before stopping at a designated sleeping location. The goal of the audax is for all group members to finish within the time limit.

== Randonneuring (allure libre form of audax) ==
Randonneuring is similar to the original Audax style in that riders attempt to complete long-distance cycling events. However, instead of riding together in a group, participants are free to cycle at their own pace (French: allure libre), stop or sleep wherever they want and form groups randomly, provided they stay within the time limit.

In some countries (e.g. USA), a clear distinction is drawn between 'Audax' and 'Randonneuring'. In others, such as Australia and Great Britain, the original Audax style is relatively unknown, and 'Audax' and 'Randonneuring' are used interchangeably.

== Organisations ==
The official organisation for the original audax style is the Union des Audax in France. The official organisation for randonneuring is Audax Club Parisien.
