= Randonneuring =

Long-distance cycling sport

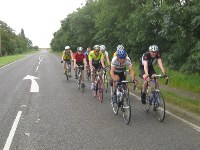
A group of cyclists riding a 200 km randonneuring event

Randonneuring (also known as Audax in the UK, Australia and Brazil) is a long-distance cycling sport that evolved from audax cycling. In randonneuring, riders attempt courses of typically of 200 km or more, although some events may be shorter. The riders pass through predetermined "controls" (checkpoints). Riders aim to complete the course within specified time limits, with all finishers receiving equal recognition regardless of their finishing order. Riders may travel in groups or alone, and are expected to be self-sufficient between controls.

A randonneuring event is called a randonnée or brevet; and a rider who has completed a 200 km event is called a randonneur. The international governing body, Audax Club Parisien (ACP), coordinates randonneuring events worldwide through Les Randonneurs Mondiaux.

== History ==
In the late nineteenth century Italy, day-long "challenge" sports became popular. Participants aimed to cover as much distance as possible and prove themselves audax ("audacious"). The first recorded audax cycling event took place on June 12, 1897, when twelve Italian cyclists attempted the challenge of cycling from Rome to Naples, a distance of 230 kilometres (140 mi), during daylight hours. Similar events became popular elsewhere, and in 1904 French journalist Henri Desgrange produced Audax regulations, which belonged to his Auto newspaper. Under the Audax regulations, riders rode as a group. Successful riders were awarded a certificate called a Brevet d'Audax. A group of successful audax cyclists formed the Audax Club Parisien (ACP), which took over the organisation of Audax events on Desgrange's behalf. In 1920, there was a disagreement between Desgrange and the ACP. Desgrange withdrew ACP's permission to organise events under his Audax regulations, and ACP created its own allure libre (free-paced) version of the sport, where successful riders were awarded certificates called Brevets des Randonneurs. This style is now popularly known as "randonneuring".

Desgrange continued to promote the original Audax rules, and on July 14, 1921, the Union of Parisian Audax Cyclistes (UACP) was formed, which became the Union of French Audax in January 1956, and later simply Union des Audax. The original style is still popular in France and neighbouring countries. In Great Britain, where the original audax style does not exist, and in Brazil, where it is not common, the term audax is used interchangeably with randonneuring, reflecting the sport's origins with Audax Club Parisien.

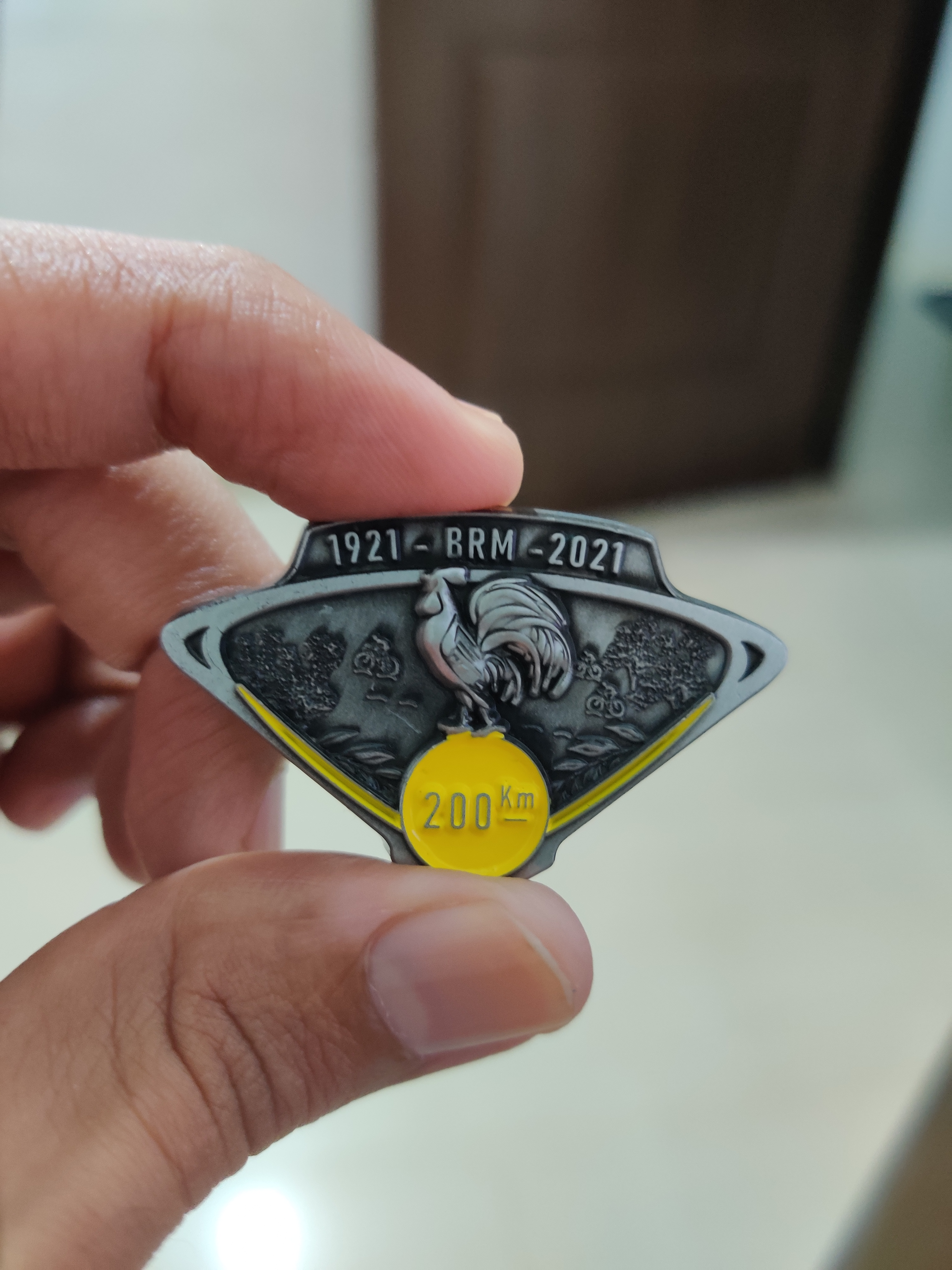
Medal issued by Audax on 100 years of BRM 200 (1921-2021)

Randonneuring has much in common with cyclotouring, the founding-father of which is often said to be the journalist Velocio (Paul de Vivie), also credited with making derailleur gears popular.

== Rules and process ==
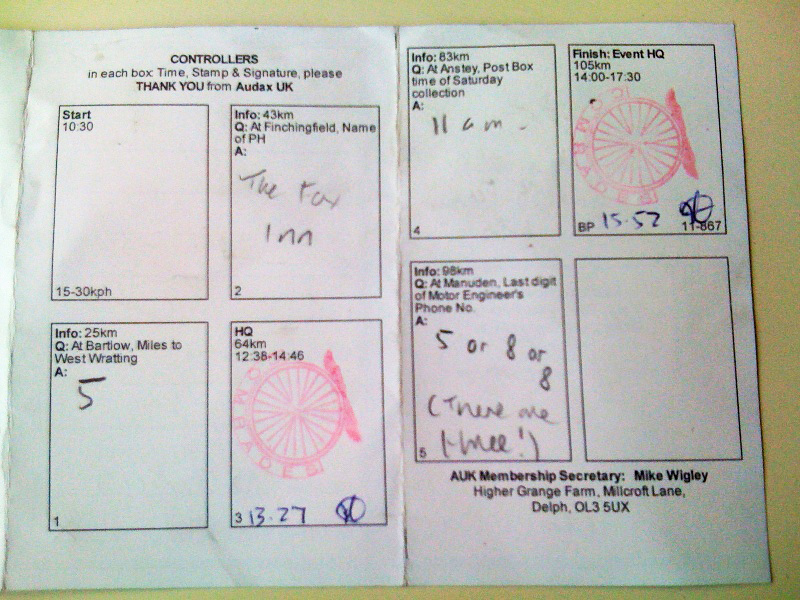
A completed brevet card from a 100 kilometres (62 mi) 'populaire'. The pink stamps are from controllers and the rider has written in the answers at the information controls.

The majority of randonneuring events are classified as "brevets des randonneurs". In such events, riders follow a course through a series of predetermined checkpoints called "controls"; these are typically a few tens of kilometres apart. Each rider carries a "brevet card" which must be stamped at each control to prove completion. In some events, riders will be required to supplant this by collecting till receipts at controls and by answering questions about their surroundings at "information controls", such as recording a distance from a milepost. At the end of the event, the brevet card is handed in to the organisers who will then check and certify the results. Riders are expected to keep within minimum and maximum average speed limits. For a typical 200-kilometre (120 mi) brevet, the minimum speed is around 15 kilometres per hour (9.3 mph) and the maximum is 30 kilometres per hour (19 mph). Riders who arrive early at controls will be made to wait before they can carry on. Riders can stop to eat and rest at controls, though no extra time is allowed for doing so. Riders are free to ride individually or in groups as they wish. A brevet is not a race, and no completion order is published. Riders are expected to be fully self-sufficient between controls and must carry food, water, spare clothing and tools to meet their requirements.

In addition to brevets appearing on a calendar date, there are "permanent" (or "raid") brevets which may be ridden on any date by prior arrangement with the organiser, and "DIY permanents" where a rider proposes a specific route. In these events, the "controls" are predesignated places where a rider will stop and collect evidence of passage such as a shop receipt.

In addition to 200-kilometre (120 mi) events, there are brevets of 300, 400, 600 kilometres (190, 250, 370 mi) and more. These will typically involve an element of night riding. There are also shorter events: in a "brevet populaire" (or simply "populaire"), riders follow a course of 50, 100, 150 kilometres (31, 62, 93 mi). These brevets are seen as a good introduction to the full-blown "randonneur" events, and also as a manageable distance for riders who don't want to ride the longer distances.

There are variations on the brevet theme including team events such as the "Flèche" or "Arrow", which usually converge on a single end point from many starts, and 200 kilometres (120 mi) per day "Dart" events.

== Bicycles and equipment ==
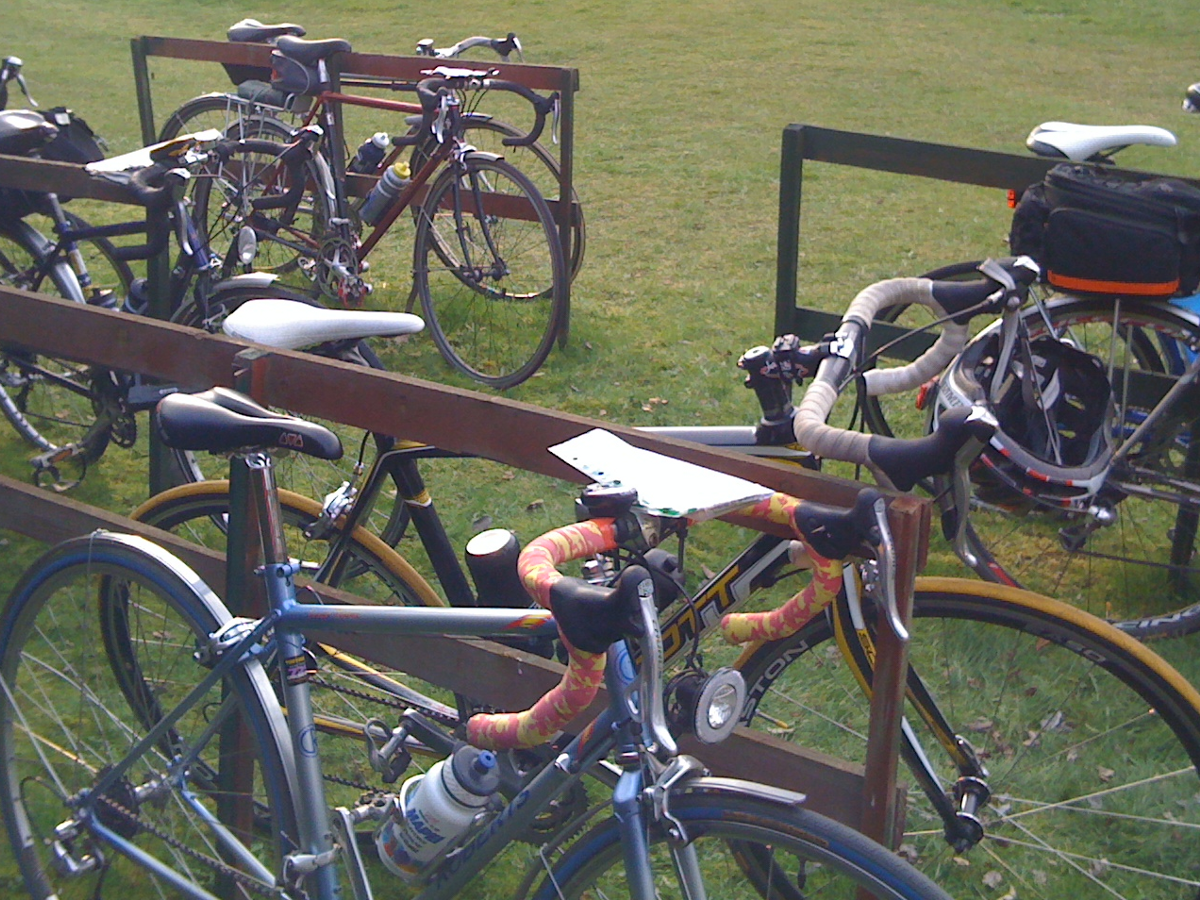
Typical bicycles at a randonneuring event in the United Kingdom.

Any type of bicycle is acceptable for randonneuring, with the only stipulation being that the bicycle must be powered solely by the human rider. Tricycles and recumbents, therefore, are allowed, but not ebikes.

Authors such as Simon Doughty describe a 'typical' randonneuring bike as being somewhere between a dedicated road-racing bike and a touring bike. Such bicycles usually have lightweight steel frames, drop handlebars, relaxed (i.e. comfortable) frame geometry, medium-width tyres, triple chainsets, moderately low gearing, and the capacity to carry lightweight luggage. Mudguards and lighting systems are also common, and may be required for some events.

As of 2019, modern lighting (LED & Lithium Ion batteries), paired with a dynamo hubs are more prevalent, as well as a mix between equipment designed for bikepacking (aerodynamic, lightweight) and more traditional pannier systems, particularly for longer distance events.

Randonneurs are expected to be self-sufficient between controls except in the event of emergency. Riders are therefore expected to carry food, water, tools, etc. Some events require riders to carry specific equipment, for example, lights, spare bulbs, and reflective clothing, though this varies depending on the organizer.

== Famous brevets ==
The majority of brevets are small and locally organized, making for a busy calendar of events for enthusiasts. There are, however, some particularly well-known events which attract participants from around the world.

=== Paris–Brest–Paris ===
Sometimes regarded as the Blue Riband Randonnée, Paris–Brest–Paris (PBP) is an approximately 1,200 kilometres (750 mi) event held on an out-and-back course between Paris and Brest every four years. Begun in 1891, it is the oldest bicycling event still regularly run. It began as a race for professional cyclists, but is now a non-competitive endurance challenge. To qualify, a cyclist must complete a series of brevets within the same year. The series can be completed in any order (200, 300, 400 and 600 kilometres (120, 190, 250 and 370 mi) is traditional), and any brevet may be replaced with a longer randonnée.

The PBP was the first popular long-distance race. After 1931 the riders were separated into three groups: professional cyclists and two non-professional groups known as the Allure libre club and the Audax club. Allure Libre consisted of individuals riding alone in the spirit of self-sufficiency, while Audax riders rode as a group and maintained a steady pace. As interest in long-distance racing had waned in favour of stage events like the Tour de France, the professional race part of the PBP was lost in 1951, leaving only the randonneuring part of the event.

The Randonneuring part of the PBP had been governed by Audax Club Parisien (ACP) since the 1930s. In 1975 the Audax and Allure libre groups split up and formed two different PBP events. Now the ACP runs the event every four years in their Allure Libre format, and the Union des Audax runs it every five years in their Audax format.

The most recent Paris-Brest-Paris was held in 2023 on August 20. In order to qualify for the event a randonneur needed to do a super randonnee series of brevets (200, 300, 400 and 600 kilometres (120, 190, 250 and 370 mi)) in the qualifying year i.e. by July 2023.

=== London–Edinburgh–London ===
London–Edinburgh–London is a 1500 km event that takes place in the United Kingdom every four years. The event typically starts in north London, taking a route through the east of England, to Edinburgh, usually returning along the same route.

The event last took place in August 2025.

=== Boston–Montreal–Boston ===
Boston–Montreal–Boston (BMB) is also a 1,200 kilometres (750 mi) out-and-back between Boston and Montreal. BMB is sometimes regarded as the North American equivalent of PBP. It was held every year except when Paris–Brest–Paris was held.

=== Other 1000 Km Brevets ===
A spreadsheet list of long distance events is available from Les Randonneurs Mondiaux at https://www.randonneursmondiaux.org/59-Calendrier_2023.html

==== Canada ====
- Riding Mountain 1000
- Vancouver Island 1200

==== India ====
- Gates of Heaven(GOH) 1200 km (Bangalore)
- Kittur Express 1000 km (Bangalore)
- Jog Falls 1000 km (Bangalore)
- Noida Dasuya Noida 1000 km (Noida)
- Deccan Queen 1000 km (Pune)
- Brevet LOC
- TN 1000
- BRM Ek Hazaar (Lucknow)

==== Ireland ====
- Celtic Knot 1000 km (Offaly)

==== Vietnam ====
- Sài Gòn - Đà Nẵng BRM

==== Belarus ====
- Polatsk-Paliessie-Polatsk BRM (Polatsk)
- Minsk Circle 1000 BRM (Minsk)
- "Lake District" (Grodna)
- "The path of the chosen ones" (Homel)
- "Zachodni", eng. Western (Slonim)

=== Other 1200 km brevets ===
==== Australia ====
- Great Southern Randonnee 1200
- Perth–Albany–Perth (Australia) 1200 km
- Sydney-Melbourne (Australia) 1200 km

==== Canada ====
- Granite Anvil 1200
- Rocky Mountain 1200
- VanIsle 1200 (Canada)

==== India ====
- Bangalore–Goa–Bangalore (BGB) 1200 (Bangalore)
- Bliss In The Hills 1200 (Bangalore)
- Gates of Heaven 1200 (Bangalore)
- Goa 2 Kanyakumari 1200 km
- Kochi–Bangalore–Kochi - Psyclepath 1200
- KODANAD – 1200 km
- Mahro Rajasthan 1200 (Delhi)
- Mumbai–Indore–Mumbai 1200
- Mumbai-Mahabaleshwar-Mumbai-Dhule-Mumbai 1200 (Mumbai)
- Jammu Express 1200 km Noida–Jammu–Noida (Noida)
- Ranbanka Ride 1200
- Rivers–Mountains–Beaches 1200
- Tapi to Aravalli 1200 km

==== USA ====
- Big Wild Ride 1200 km (Alaska)
- Cascade 1200 km (Washington)
- Colorado High Country 1200 km Randonnée (Colorado)
- Coulee Challenge 1200 Brevet (Minnesota/Wisconsin)
- Gold Rush Randonnée 1200 km (California)
- Last Chance 1200 km Randonnée (Colorado)
- Taste of Carolina 1200 km (North Carolina)
- Texas Rando Stampede 1200 km (Texas)

==== Russia ====
- 1200 Chuiski tract
- Trans Oural
- Vologda–Onega–Ladoga 1200 km

==== Other countries ====
- Big Tour of Bavaria 1200 (Germany)
- BRM Tour of Hungary 1200 (Hungary)
- Central Vietnam LRM 1300 (Vietnam)
- Herentals – Cosne s/Loire – Herentals 1200 (Belgium)
- Israel 1200 km (Israel)
- Korea Grande Randonnee 1200 (Korea)
- Lowlands 1200 km (Netherlands)
- Lviv–Karpaty–Lviv, 1200 km (Ukraine)
- Madrid–Gijon–Madrid 1200 km (Spain)
- Míle Fáilte 1200 (Ireland)
- Hokkaido 1200 km (Japan)
- Silk Route (Uzbekistan) 1200 km
- Södertälje–Falkenberg–Södertälje 1200 km (Sweden)
- Sofia–Varna–Sofia 1200 km (Bulgaria)
- Super Brevet Scandinavia 1200 km (Denmark, Norway, Sweden)
- Minsk–Brest–Paris 1200 km (Belarus)

=== Other 1400 km brevets ===
- 4 Corners of Croatia 1450 km (Croatia)
- Bangkok–Phrae–Bangkok 1400 km (Thailand)
- BHARD Brevet (Bosnia and Herzegovina)
- Dalhousie 1400 km (Noida Randonneurs) (India)
- Danube Road Randonneur 1440 km (Romania)
- Dutch Capitals Tour 1400 km (Netherlands)
- Giro Central Greece 1400 km (Greece)

=== Other 1400 plus km brevets ===
- 1001 Miglia 1630 km (Italy)
- Berlin-Munich-Berlin 1500 km (Germany)
- Bristol-Glasgow-Bristol 1600km (United Kingdom)
- Hamburg–Berlin–Cologne–Hamburg 1500 km (Germany)
- Maraton Rowerowy Dookoła Polski 3130 km (Poland)
- Sverigetempot 2100 km (Sweden)
- Tour Aotearoa 3000 km (New Zealand)
- Ultimate Island Explorer 2000 km (Canada)
- Uppsala–Trondheim–Uppsala 1500 km (Sweden & Norway)
- Wild Atlantic Way 2100 km (Ireland)
- Ro-Velo 360 Tour, 3000km (Romania)

== Awards ==
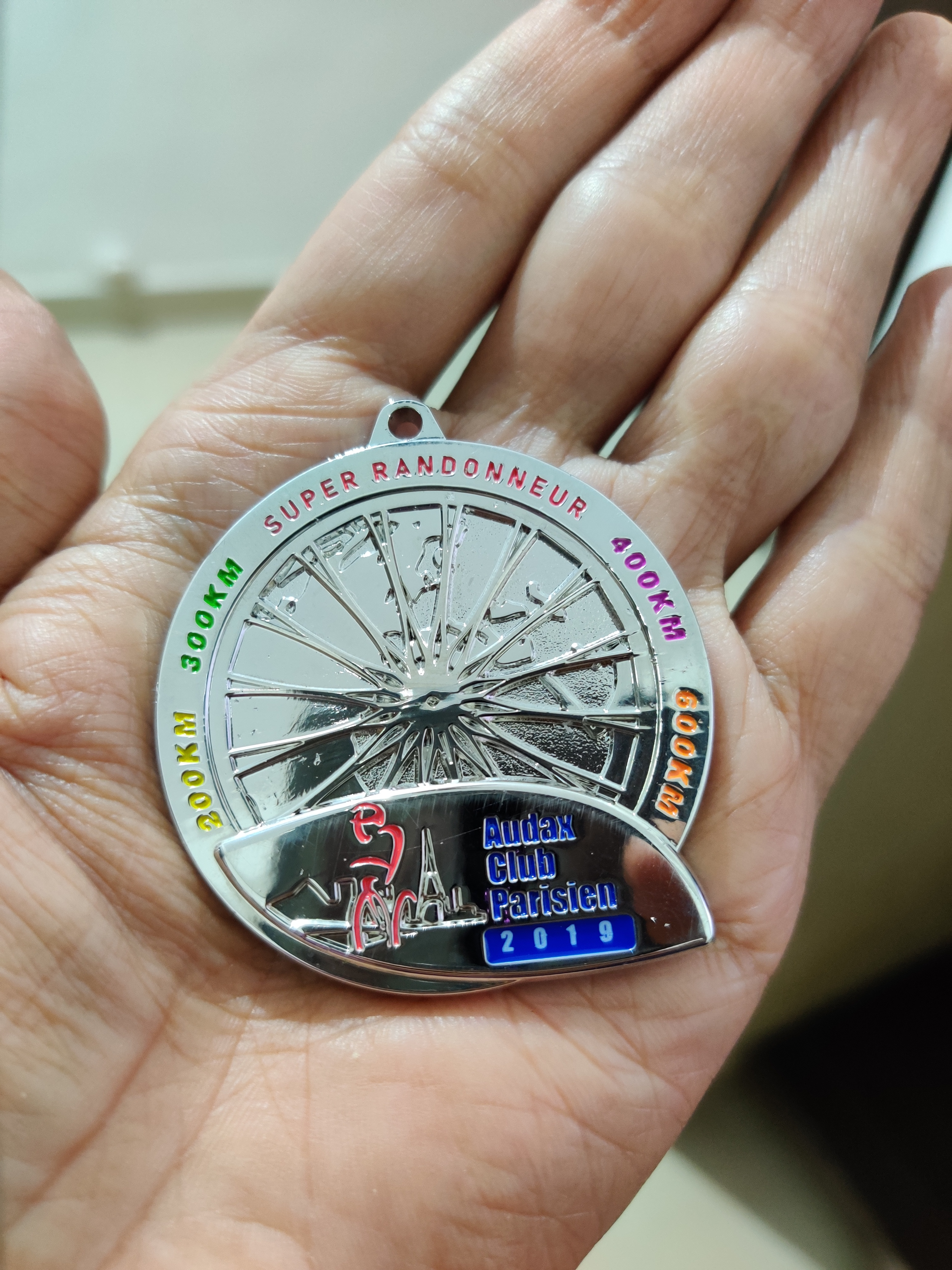
Super Randonneur medal

A rider who has completed a 200-kilometre (120 mi) brevet in limited time is called a randonneur. This is a lifelong title.

Riders completing events receive awards, either from Audax Club Parisien or another randonneuring organisation. Examples of these are:

- Brevet Medal – for completing any single brevet of 200, 300, 400, 600 or 1,000 kilometres (120, 190, 250, 370 or 620 mi).
- Super Randonneur – for completing a series of 200,-300,-400-and-600-kilometre (120, 190, 250 and 370 mi) brevets within the same season.
- Randonneur 5000 – for completing the full series of 200,-300,-400,-600-and-1,000-kilometre (120, 190, 250, 370 and 620 mi) brevets, the Paris–Brest–Paris and a Flèche Vélocio (in which at least three riders must start, and at least three must finish). Other BRM, LRM, or ACP homologated events up to a balance of 5000 km total, all within 4 years.
- Randonneur 10000 – for completing two full series of 200,-300,-400,-600-and-1,000-kilometre (120, 190, 250, 370 and 620 mi) brevets, the Paris–Brest–Paris, another 1200 km event homologated by LRM, a Flèche Vélocio (in which at least three riders must start, and at least three must finish), and a 1 Super Randonnee (a permanent of 600 km and at least 10,000 m (32.800 ft) of climbing, within a 60-hour time limit, homologated by the Audax Club Parisien). Other BRM, LRM, or ACP homologated events up to a balance of 10000 km total, all within 4 years.
- Paris–Brest–Paris – for completion of the PBP within the 90-hour time.
- Many others – for example, BMB, RUSA specific Super Randonneur.

== Time limits ==
Randonneuring events must be undertaken within set time limits based on a set average speed. There is some regional variation in these, but the following list is typical:

- 200 kilometres (120 mi) – 13.5 hours (15 km/h)
- 300 kilometres (190 mi) – 20 hours (15 km/h)
- 400 kilometres (250 mi) – 27 hours (15 km/h)
- 600 kilometres (370 mi) – 40 hours (15 km/h)
- 1,000 kilometres (620 mi) – 75 hours (13.3 km/h)
- 1,200 kilometres (750 mi) – 90 hours (13.3 km/h)
- 1,400 kilometres (870 mi) – 116:40 hours (12 km/h)
- 2,200 kilometres (1,400 mi) – 220 hours (10 km/h)

Note that the average minimum speeds to complete an event (in parentheses) are taken over the full time limit, including rest stops. To emphasise that Randonneuring events are not a race, many events also have a maximum speed equal to double the minimum speed (i.e. 30 km/h for a 600 km event). Organisers are usually free to reduce the maximum speed. This sometimes makes it easier to man controls at particularly hilly events.

For events homologated by Les Randonneurs Mondiaux where the rate of climbing is greater than 11 meters per kilometre their President will give consideration to requests for extra time. This will normally be based on a 5% allowance for every full m/km of extra climbing.

== See also ==
- Challenge riding
- Cyclosportive
- Race Across America
- Reliability trial
