= Deaths in December 1996 =

The following is a list of notable deaths in December 1996.

Entries for each day are listed alphabetically by surname. A typical entry lists information in the following sequence:

- Name, age, country of citizenship at birth, subsequent country of citizenship (if applicable), reason for notability, cause of death (if known), and reference.

== December 1996 ==
=== 1 ===
- Peter Bronfman, 67, Canadian businessman and entrepreneur, cancer.
- Constantine George Cholakis, 66, American district judge (United States District Court for the Northern District of New York).
- Alan Coldham, 90, Australian tennis player.
- Sonia Furió, 59, Spanish-Mexican actress, singer, and dancer.
- Irving Gordon, 81, American songwriter, myeloma cancer.
- Jacek Gutowski, 36, Polish weightlifter and Olympian (1988).
- Štefan Olekšák, 56, Slovak Olympic skier (1964).
- James Record, 77, American politician and author.
- Kalle Sievänen, 85, Finnish Olympic sports shooter (1956, 1960, 1964).
- Jan G. Waldenström, 90, Swedish physician.

=== 2 ===
- Jules Bastin, 63, Belgian operatic bass.
- Jean Jérôme Hamer, 80, Belgian Roman Catholic cardinal.
- Mike Morgan, 54, American gridiron football player (Philadelphia Eagles, Washington Redskins, New Orleans Saints).
- Marri Chenna Reddy, 77, Indian politician.

=== 3 ===
- John Bateman, 56, American Major League baseball player (Houston Colt .45s/Astros, Montreal Expos, Philadelphia Phillies).
- Georges Duby, 77, French historian, cancer.
- Norm Houser, 80, American racing driver.
- Babrak Karmal, 67, Afghan revolutionary and President of Afghanistan, liver cancer.
- Miguel Ortega, 87-88, Mexican Olympic modern pentathlete (1932).
- Solveig von Schoultz, 89, Finnish writer, novelist, and teacher.

=== 4 ===
- Ernie Harris, 77, Welsh cricketer.
- Syd Heylen, 76, Australian actor, comedian, and variety performer, stroke.
- Azharul Islam, 52, Bangladeshi politician, cardiac arrest.
- Willard Parker, 84, American actor, heart attack.
- Leon Polk Smith, 90, American painter.
- Albert Winsemius, 86, Dutch economist, pneumonia.
- Ans Wortel, 67, Dutch painter, poet and writer.
- Jan Čuřík, 72, Czech cinematographer.

=== 5 ===
- Robert Brewer, 72, United States Army officer during World War II.
- Wilf Carter, 91, Canadian Country and Western singer, songwriter, and yodeller, stomach cancer.
- Karl H. Fell, 59, German politician.
- Cliff Mapes, 74, American baseball player (New York Yankees, St. Louis Browns, Detroit Tigers).
- Lyle Neat, 80, American basketball player.
- Carey Spicer, 87, American football and basketball player and coach.
- Adolf Bredo Stabell, 88, Norwegian diplomat.

=== 6 ===
- Harry Babcock, 66, American gridiron football player (San Francisco 49ers).
- Jean Bertholle, 87, French painter.
- Victor Bruns, 92, German composer and bassoonist.
- Abdul Hamid Kishk, 63, Egyptian preacher, scholar of Islam, activist, and author.
- Robert Lees, 74, American linguist.
- Ricky Owens, 57, American singer.
- Pete Rozelle, 70, American commissioner of the National Football League, brain cancer.
- Alex Schoenbaum, 81, American collegiate football player and businessman.

=== 7 ===
- José Donoso, 72, Chilean writer, journalist and professor, liver cancer.
- Johnny Hall, 79, American gridiron football player (Chicago Cardinals, Detroit Lions).
- Ali Hatami, 52, Iranian film director, screenwriter, art director, and costume designer, pancreatic cancer.
- Giuseppe Perego, 81, Italian comics artist.
- Phillip Reed, 88, American actor.
- Ryszard Szymczak, 51, Polish football player and Olympian (1972).

=== 8 ===
- Rolf Blomberg, 84, Swedish explorer, writer, photographer and producer of documentary films.
- Prince Eugenio, Duke of Genoa, 90, Italian prince.
- Espanto III, 56, Mexican professional wrestler, heart attack.
- José Luis González, 70, Puerto Rican essayist, novelist, and journalist.
- Jack H. Hexter, 86, American historian.
- Ron Hibbert, 72, Australian rules footballer.
- Tommy Lahiff, 86, Australian rules football player.
- John Langeloth Loeb Sr., 94, American investor and executive.
- Paulene Myers, 83, American actress (Lady Sings the Blues, The Sting, My Cousin Vinny).
- Johnny Olszewski, 66, American gridiron football player.
- Howard Rollins, 46, American actor (Ragtime, In the Heat of the Night, A Soldier's Story), complications from AIDS-related lymphoma.
- Dorothy Schroeder, 68, American baseball player, intracranial aneurysm.
- Marin Sorescu, 60, Romanian poet, playwright, and novelist, heart attack.
- Kashiwado Tsuyoshi, 58, Japanese sumo wrestler, liver failure.

=== 9 ===
- June Carlson, 72, American actress, aneurysm.
- Patty Donahue, 40, American vocalist of new wave group the Waitresses, lung cancer.
- Bruno Frietsch, 100, Finnish Olympic sports shooter (1936).
- Li Ki-joo, 70, South Korean football player.
- Yun Chi-young, 96, South Korean politician.
- Mary Leakey, 83, British paleoanthropologist.
- Diana Morgan, 88, British playwright and screenwriter.
- Alain Poher, 87, French politician.
- Ivor Roberts-Jones, 83, British sculptor.
- Raphael Samuel, 61, British Marxist historian and intellectual.
- Hans Schwarz, 84, German Olympic swimmer (1936).
- Woody Woodard, 79, American gridiron football player and coach, basketball coach, track coach, college athletics administrator.

=== 10 ===
- Jakov Blažević, 84, Croatian lawyer and politician.
- John Duffey, 62, American bluegrass musician, heart attack.
- John Price, 83, Danish film actor and director, and the father of Danish screenwriter Adam Price.
- Richa Sharma, 32, Indian actress.
- Eric Webber, 76, English football player and manager.
- Faron Young, 64, American country music producer, singer and songwriter, suicide.

=== 11 ===
- Juan Carlos Barbieri, 64, Argentine actor.
- Des Booth, 76, Australian politician.
- Charles Hamilton, 82, American paleographer, handwriting expert and author.
- Willie Rushton, 59, English cartoonist, comedian, and actor, heart attack.
- W. G. G. Duncan Smith, 82, British Royal Air Force flying ace during World War II.
- Marie-Claude Vaillant-Couturier, 84, French photojournalist and politician, cancer.

=== 12 ===
- Larry Gates, 81, American actor (Guiding Light, Cat on a Hot Tin Roof, In the Heat of the Night).
- Willy Hufschmid, 78, Swiss Olympic handball player (1936).
- George Jumonville, 79, American Major League Baseball player (Philadelphia Phillies).
- Buks Marais, 68, South African rugby player.
- Anton Moravčík, 65, Slovak footballer.
- Nikola Nenov, 89, Bulgarian Olympic cyclist (1936).
- Vance Packard, 82, American journalist, social critic, and author.

=== 13 ===
- Waheed Akhtar, 62, Indian poet, writer, critic, and a Muslim scholar and philosopher.
- Mae Barnes, 89, American jazz singer, dancer and comic entertainer.
- Edward Blishen, 76, English author and broadcaster.
- Jeff Brownschidle, 37, American ice hockey player (Hartford Whalers).
- James Cassels, 89, British Army officer.
- Francesco Gabrieli, 92, Italian arabist.
- Arthur Jacobs, 74, British music critic and musicologist.
- Eulace Peacock, 82, American sprinter, Alzheimer's disease.
- Clarence Wijewardena, 53, Sri Lankan singer, composer and musician, liver cirrhosis.
- Cao Yu, 86, Chinese playwright.

=== 14 ===
- Doina Cojocaru, 48, Romanian handball player and Olympian (1976).
- John Craven, 49, English football player, heart attack.
- Lennart Holmqvist, 63, Swedish footballer.
- Howard B. Keck, 83, American businessman and Thoroughbred racehorse owner and breeder.
- Andy McLaren, 74, Scottish football player.
- Gaston Miron, 68, French Canadian writer.

=== 15 ===
- Dawn Crosby, 33, American heavy metal singer, liver failure from substance abuse.
- Giuseppe Dossetti, 83, Italian jurist, politician, and Catholic priest.
- Dave Kaye, 90, English pianist.
- Harry Kemelman, 88, American mystery writer and a professor of English, kidney failure.
- Tristan Keuris, 50, Dutch composer.
- Adalberto López, 73, Mexican football player.
- Sir Laurens van der Post, 90, South African Afrikaner author, farmer, journalist, philosopher, explorer and conservationist.

=== 16 ===
- Camille Barbaud, 96, French Olympic athlete (1924).
- Quentin Bell, 86, English biographer and art historian.
- Sven Bergqvist, 82, Swedish football and ice hockey player (1936 Summer, 1936 Winter).
- Nokukhanya Bhengu, 92, South African women’s leader and anti-apartheid activist
- Charlie Epperson, 77, American basketball player (Wisconsin Badgers).
- George M. Jones, 85, United States Army brigadier general.
- Dolores Medio, 85, Spanish writer.
- Carlo Reguzzoni, 88, Italian football player.
- Arthur Shores, 92, American civil rights attorney.

=== 17 ===
- Armando, 26, American house music producer and DJ, leukemia.
- Wayne Barlow, 84, American composer of classical music.
- Li Han-hsiang, 70, Chinese film director, heart attack.
- Johannes Kaiser, 60, German Olympic sprinter (1960).
- Adriaan Maas, 89, Dutch Olympic sailor (1932, 1936, 1948, 1952).
- Lawrie Miller, 73, New Zealand cricket player.
- Ruby Murray, 61, Northern Irish singer and actress, liver cancer.
- George Pfann, 94, American gridiron football player and coach.
- İlyas Seçkin, 78, Turkish politician.
- Stanko Todorov, 76, Bulgarian communist politician.
- Violet Walrond, 91, New Zealand Olympic swimmer (1920).
- Sun Yaoting, 92, last imperial Chinese eunuch.

=== 18 ===
- Irving Caesar, 101, American lyricist and theater composer.
- Charles Deaton, 75, American architect.
- Gwilym Hugh Lewis, 99, British flying ace during World War I.
- József Mácsár, 58, Hungarian Olympic middle-distance runner (1964).
- Ayşe Şan, 58, Kurdish singer.
- Kálmán Sóvári, 86, Hungarian Olympic wrestler (1936, 1948).
- Suryakantam, 72, Indian actress.

=== 19 ===
- Bobby Cole, 64, American musician, heart attack.
- Ted Darling, 61, Canadian sportscaster, Pick disease.
- Ejvind Hansen, 72, Danish sprint canoeist and Olympian (1948, 1952).
- Ronald Howard, 78, English actor and writer.
- Amata Kabua, 68, President of the Marshall Islands (1979–1996).
- Yulii Borisovich Khariton, 92, Russian nuclear physicist.
- Marcello Mastroianni, 72, Italian actor (La Dolce Vita, 8½, Divorce Italian Style), pancreatic cancer.
- Peter McLaren, 72, Australian rules footballer.

=== 20 ===
- Melio Bettina, 80, American boxer.
- Osvaldo Lira, 92, Chilean priest, philosopher and theologian.
- Thakin Lwin, 82, Burmese politician, trade unionist, writer and journalist.
- Bengt Malmsten, 74, Swedish Olympic speed skater (1952, 1956).
- Charles Morton, 80, American Olympic racing cyclist (1936).
- Len Murphy, 87, Australian rules footballer.
- Carl Sagan, 62, American astronomer, astrophysicist, and author (Cosmos, Contact), pneumonia.

=== 21 ===
- Kell Areskoug, 90, Swedish Olympic sprinter (1932, 1936).
- Enrico Benedetti, 56, Italian ice hockey player and Olympian (1964).
- Christine Brückner, 75, German writer.
- Clarence Gosse, 84, Canadian politician.
- Barry Gray, 80, American radio personality, known as "The father of Talk Radio".
- Kálmán Hazai, 83, Hungarian Olympic water polo player (1936).
- Margret Rey, 90, German-American children's author and illustrator, heart attack.
- Chuck Spieser, 67, American Olympic boxer (1948).
- Mickey Taborn, 74, American baseball player.
- Alfred Tonello, 67, French racing cyclist and Olympian (1952).

=== 22 ===
- Oscar Alende, 87, Argentine politician.
- Mária Bartuszová, 60, Slovak sculptor.
- Nealie Duggan, 73, Irish Gaelic football player.
- Fred Green, 63, American baseball player (Pittsburgh Pirates, Washington Senators).
- Jack Hamm, 80, American cartoonist.
- Chiang Hsiao-yung, 48, Taiwanese politician, esophageal cancer.
- Don Meade, 83, American National Champion jockey.
- Igor Oberberg, 89, Russian Empire-born German cinematographer.

=== 23 ===
- Aram Karamanoukian, 86, Syrian Army Lieutenant General, politician and author.
- Rina Ketty, 85, Italian singer.
- Vicente González Lizondo, 54, Spanish politician, heart attack.
- Mića Popović, 73, Serbian artist.
- Ronnie Scott, 69, British jazz tenor saxophonist and jazz club owner, accidental overdose of barbiturate.
- Infanta Maria Cristina of Spain, 85, Spanish princess, heart attack.
- Emrys Thomas, 96, Welsh socialist politician.
- Sophie Toscan du Plantier, 39, French television producer, beaten to death.

=== 24 ===
- Al Adair, 67, Canadian politician and baseball player, heart attack.
- Takeo Doi, 92, Japanese aircraft designer.
- Leonard Firestone, 89, American businessman, diplomat, and philanthropist.
- Pierre de Maupeou d'Ableiges, 86, French Olympic equestrian (1948).
- Bobby Robinson, 46, Scottish football player.
- Nguyen Huu Tho, 86, Vietnamese revolutionary and politician.
- Milan Vasojević, 63, Serbian basketball coach.

=== 25 ===
- Lee Alexander, 69, American politician, cancer.
- Tony Dauksza, 84, American football player, film-maker, and outdoorsman.
- Roger Duchesne, 90, French actor.
- Bill Hewitt, 68, Canadian sportscaster, heart attack.
- Luis Marmentini, 74, Chilean Olympic basketball player (1948).
- Bill Osmanski, 80, American gridiron football player (Chicago Bears), and coach.
- Al Schottelkotte, 69, American news anchor and reporter, cancer.
- Sue Bailey Thurman, 93, American author, historian and civil rights activist.
- Clayton Tonnemaker, 68, American gridiron football player (Green Bay Packers).
- Harry Watson, 92, New Zealand racing cyclist.
- August Wenzinger, 91, Swiss musician and conductor.

=== 26 ===
- Narcís Jubany Arnau, 83, Spanish Catholic cardinal.
- Ray Bray, 79, American gridiron football player.
- Michael Bruno, 64, Israeli economist, cancer.
- Frank Edwin Egler, 85, American plant ecologist.
- Frank Liebel, 77, American National Football League player (New York Giants, Chicago Bears).
- Eleanor Lynn, 80, American actress.
- Misha Mahowald, 33, American computational neuroscientist, suicide.
- JonBenét Ramsey, 6, American child beauty queen, asphyxia by strangulation and craniocerebral trauma.
- Morris Schapiro, 83, American investment banker and chess master.
- Olle Tandberg, 78, Swedish boxer and Olympian (1936).

=== 27 ===
- Gene Brabender, 55, American Major League Baseball pitcher (Baltimore Orioles, Seattle Pilots/Milwaukee Brewers), brain aneurysm.
- Mary Celine Fasenmyer, 90, American mathematician.
- Johnny Heartsman, 60, American blues musician and songwriter, stroke.
- Gabriel Loire, 92, French French stained glass artist.
- Julián Mateos, 58, Spanish actor and film producer, lung cancer.
- Kourkène Medzadourian, 88, Armenian activist.
- Nicolae Militaru, 71, Romanian soldier and communist politician, cancer.
- Neil O'Donnell, 82, American basketball player.
- Juan José Ortega, 92, Mexican film director, producer and screenwriter.
- Sarmad Sindhi, 35, Pakistani folk singer and songwriter, traffic accident.
- Jean-Claude Tramont, 62, Belgian film director.

=== 28 ===
- Edward Carfagno, 89, American fencer and art director (Ben-Hur, The Bad and the Beautiful, Soylent Green), Oscar winner (1953, 1954, 1960).
- Ferd Dreher, 83, American gridiron football player (Chicago Bears).
- Katherine Pollak Ellickson, 91, American labor economist.
- Edward Gerard Hettinger, 94, American Roman Catholic clergyman and bishop.
- Jean Roy, 73, Canadian politician, member of the House of Commons of Canada (1968-1979).
- Annik Shefrazian, 86-87, Iranian Armenian actress.

=== 29 ===
- Alma Birk, 79, British journalist and politician.
- Pennar Davies, 85, British writer.
- Mireille Hartuch, 90, French singer, composer, and actress.
- Margaret Herbison, 89, Scottish politician, cancer.
- Jerry Knight, 44, American R&B vocalist and bassist, cancer.
- Dorothy Livesay, 87, Canadian poet.
- Daniel Mayer, 87, French politician and member of the French Resistance.
- Qazi Mohib, 33, Pakistani field hockey player and Olympian (1988).
- Robert J. Morris, 82, American anti-Communist activist, heart failure.
- Vasily Ilyich Mykhlik, 74, Soviet Air Forces pilot and Hero of the Soviet Union.
- Tom Pedi, 83, American actor.
- Len Rader, 75, American basketball player.
- Gino Sinimberghi, 83, Italian opera singer.
- Oswald Szemerényi, 83, Hungarian linguist.
- Johan Trandem, 97, Norwegian athlete and Olympian (1928).

=== 30 ===
- Pokey Allen, 53, American gridiron football player and coach.
- Lew Ayres, 88, American actor (All Quiet on the Western Front, Dr. Kildare, Johnny Belinda).
- Lou Barle, 80, American basketball player.
- Erik Heiberg, 80, Norwegian Olympic sailor (1952).
- Jack Nance, 53, American actor (Eraserhead, Twin Peaks, Dune), subdural hematoma.
- Lev Oshanin, 84, Russian poet, playwright and writer.
- Broome Pinniger, 94, Indian Olympic field hockey player (1928, 1932).
- Keith A. Walker, 61, American writer, film producer, actor (The Fall Guy, The Goonies, Free Willy), cancer.

=== 31 ===
- George Abbott, 85, Canadian ice hockey player (Boston Bruins).
- Wesley Addy, 83, American actor.
- Annie Ducaux, 88, French actress.
- Sam Narron, 83, American baseball player (St. Louis Cardinals), and coach.
- Fred Joseph Nichol, 84, American district judge (United States District Court for the District of South Dakota).
- Michael Roberts, 88, British historian of early modern Sweden.
- Winston P. Wilson, 85, United States Air Force major general.
