= Le Ride =

2016 film directed by Philip Keoghan

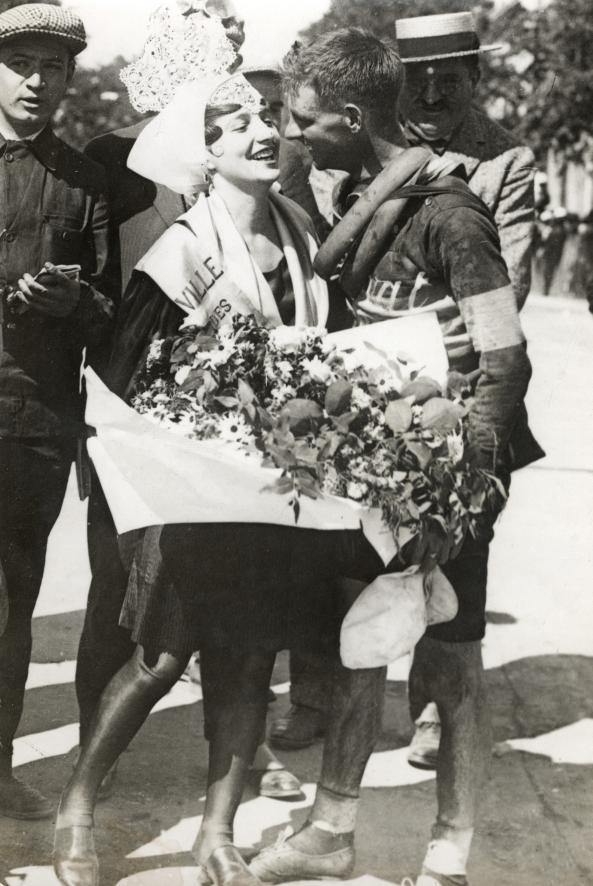
- Hubert Opperman after the 6th stage
- English: The Ride
- Directed by: Philip Keoghan
- Starring: Louise Keoghan; Philip Keoghan
- Production company: No Opportunity Wasted
- Distributed by: Pink Moon
- Release date: 2016
- Running time: 90 minutes
- Countries: United States; France; New Zealand
- Language: English
- Box office: $22,658

Le Ride is a film which recreates the 1928 Tour de France ride by the four-person Australasian team, and in particular of the New Zealander in their midst, Harry Watson. The Amazing Race host Phil Keoghan and his riding partner Ben Cornell completed the 5,600-kilometre (3,500 mi) ride in 22 stages spread over 26 days to the original schedule in 2013. Keoghan's wife Louise Keoghan was the producer for the film, which premiered in Watson's home town Christchurch in July 2016.

== Background ==
Keoghan was born in Lincoln, New Zealand and went to school in nearby Christchurch. Despite being a cycling-enthusiast, he had not heard of Christchurch cyclist Harry Watson who was the first New Zealander to compete in the Tour de France. In 2010, Keoghan learned about Watson by reading his biography, Harry Watson: The Mile Eater, authored by Jonathan Kennett, his partner Bronwen Wall, and cycling historian Ian Gray. "Blown away" by the inspiring biography, Keoghan decided that he would tell Watson's story. The three Australians (Hubert Opperman, Percy Osborn, and Ernest Bainbridge) and Watson had most of the necessary funds to go to Europe raised by newspapers (The Melbourne Herald, The Sporting Globe, and The Sun in New Zealand). The four were to be complemented in France by six Europeans to make a team of ten, but this failed to eventuate. Competing with such a small team against teams of ten put the Australasians at a significant disadvantage, and the general expectation voiced in the media was that they could consider themselves lucky if they would make it as far as the Pyrenees, i.e. manage to stay in the race for the first eight stages.

== Plot ==
Keoghan is seeking advice from Jonathan and Simon Kennett about re-enacting Harry Watson's 1928 ride in the Tour de France on period bicycles. Jonathan Kennett's advice to Keoghan is:

I don't think that you know what you are letting yourself in for, and if you did, you wouldn't do it.

Keoghan proceeds regardless and talks Ben Cornell into being his riding partner. They procure racing bikes from the era, and Keoghan researches the original route and drives it. The day after the 2013 Tour de France arrives in Paris, Keoghan and Cornell set off; not as planned early in the morning but late in the afternoon after Cornell's bike was temporarily lost by an airline. Sticking to the original schedule for every stage, day 1 finished in the middle of the night; one of many night time finishes.

Keoghan and Cornell's experiences are interlaced with historic footage, showing the drama of the day. The 1928 race was designed to eliminate as many riders as possible, and of the 164 riders who started (other sources show slightly different numbers), only 41 finished the race. Historic footage is narrated in newsreader style by veteran New Zealand newsreader Hewitt Humphrey. French media coverage is conveyed, where the general expectation was for the Australasian team to be eliminated quickly, as they would not be able to keep up with the 10-person teams of European riders.

Keoghan and Cornell sometimes get joined by other riders. In the Pyrenees, a local cycle enthusiast and historian mapped out a detailed schedule which saw them start at midnight so that they would get to their destination before nightfall. The three set off together and by 8am, they had already covered 100 miles (160 km), equating to half that day's distance. Keoghan wonders why they started so early, not realising that the harder part of the ride was still to come. In the end, Keoghan and Cornell could not keep up with their 65-year old host, who also rode a period bicycle, and they were slower than expected, finishing the day after 23 hours of riding. Keoghan and Cornell had difficulty navigating and on occasions, inadvertently ended up on A class roads where cycling is prohibited.

Keoghan and Cornell arrived back in Paris after 26 days, as per their schedule, outside the Parc des Princes that in 1928 was a velodrome. They reflected that there are parts of the ride that they cannot remember due to physical and mental exhaustion. Against the odds, three of the four Australasian riders reached Paris, defying all dire predictions. Keoghan repeatedly reflects that despite his and Cornell's exhaustion, their 2013 ride was much easier than what Watson encountered, with unsealed roads and many punctures per day.

== Production ==
Phil Keoghan and Ben Cornell are the main two riders during the 2013 re-enactment; Keoghan also narrates off the bike and directed the movie. Produced as a documentary, much historical footage is shown, both as still photos and movie clips. Keoghan found many of the still photos at the National Museum of Australia in Canberra where curators were unaware what exactly the collection of old photographic plates showed. Louise Keoghan, Phil Keoghan's wife, was the producer for the movie. Greg Peart was the photo-moto for the team and is often filmed himself. Phil Keoghan's parents John and Beth were support crew, with his father as driver. Scott Shelley was the cameraman, Uri Sharon was the second camera in French and Jess Bushyhead was the editor.

Keoghan chose Christchurch for the world premiere to give prominence to a forgotten hero. The film first screened at the restored Isaac Theatre Royal on 29 July 2016 as part of the New Zealand International Film Festival; Keoghan walked past the building every day early in his career on his way to the Television New Zealand studio in Gloucester Street.

== See also ==
- List of films about bicycles and cycling
