= Malvern Star =

Australian bicycle manufacturer

Malvern Star Bicycle Company
- Type: Private
- Industry: Bicycles
- Founded: 1903
- Headquarters: Melbourne, Australia
- Products: Bicycle and Related Components
- Parent: Sheppard Cycles
- Website: www.malvernstar.com.au

Malvern Star is a manufacturer of bicycles based in Melbourne, Australia. The company was established in 1902, and went on to become a known brand in Australia.

== History ==
Malvern Star advertisement from 1945

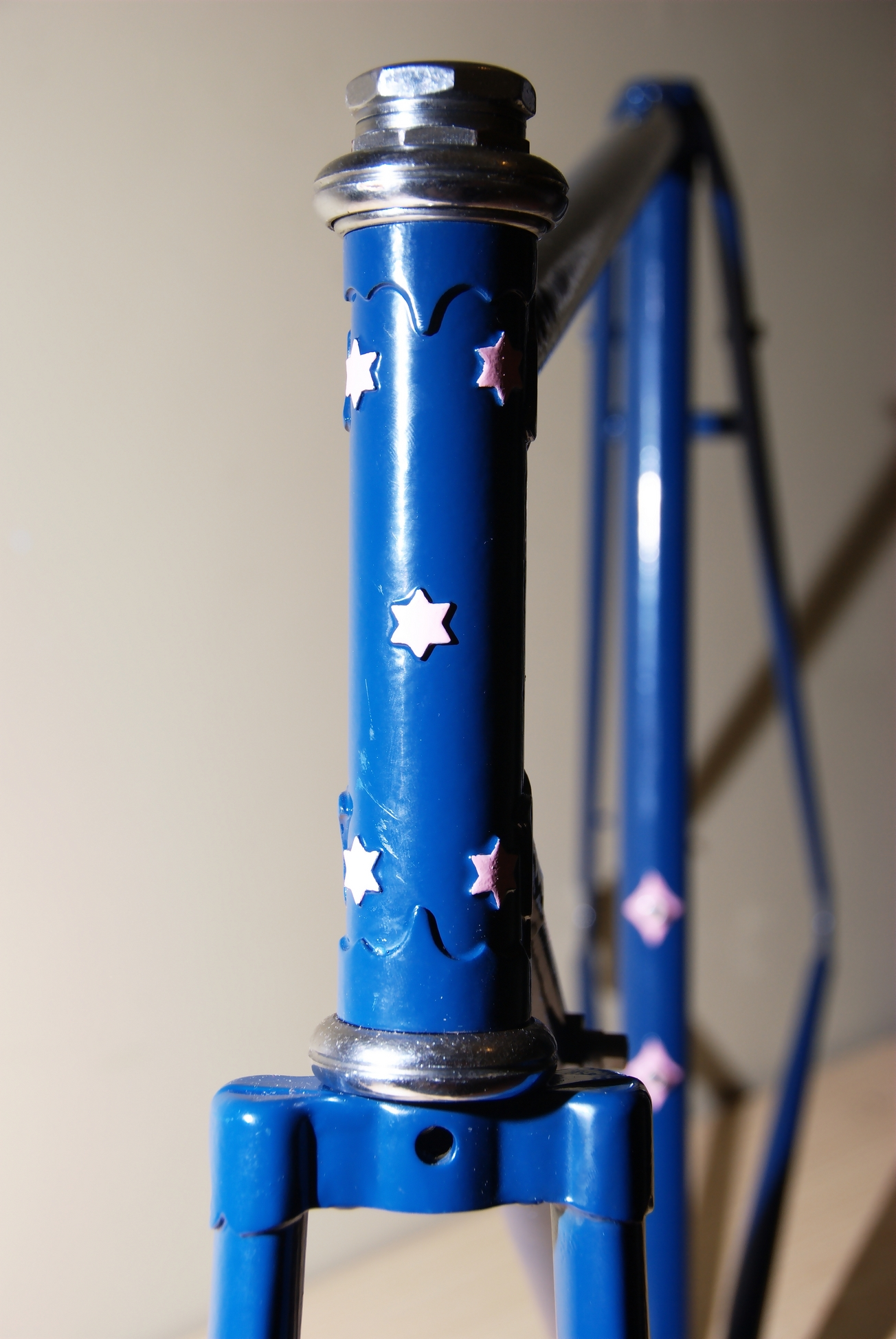
A vintage Malvern star frame, a "top of the range" Five Star model

Malvern Star opened in a small shop at 58 Glenferrie Rd, in the Melbourne suburb of Malvern in 1902. It was started by cyclist Tom Finnigan who established the shop with the prize he earned (240 gold sovereigns) by winning the 1898 Austral Wheel Race. Finnigan specialised in touring and racing bikes, which he called Malvern Stars. The business grew with the popularity of cycling and despite competition from English and American firms. Part of Finnigan's success was due to the endorsement of Don Kirkham, one of the best-known Australian cyclists. Finnigan introduced a logo featuring a six-pointed star, which matched a tattoo on his forearm, used throughout the 1900s. His family is still in the bicycle trade, running a shop in Northcote.

Finnigan retired and on 1 June 1920, the business was bought by 24-year-old Bruce Small. His brothers, Frank and Ralph, joined in the business, enlarging the shop (despite a number change, still the same shop - 185 Glenferrie Rd). Small offered prizes in cycle races, resulting in 17-year-old racer Hubert Opperman winning a prize in 1921, and impressing Small so much that he offered him a job. Thus started a long relationship, with Small friend and sponsor of Opperman.

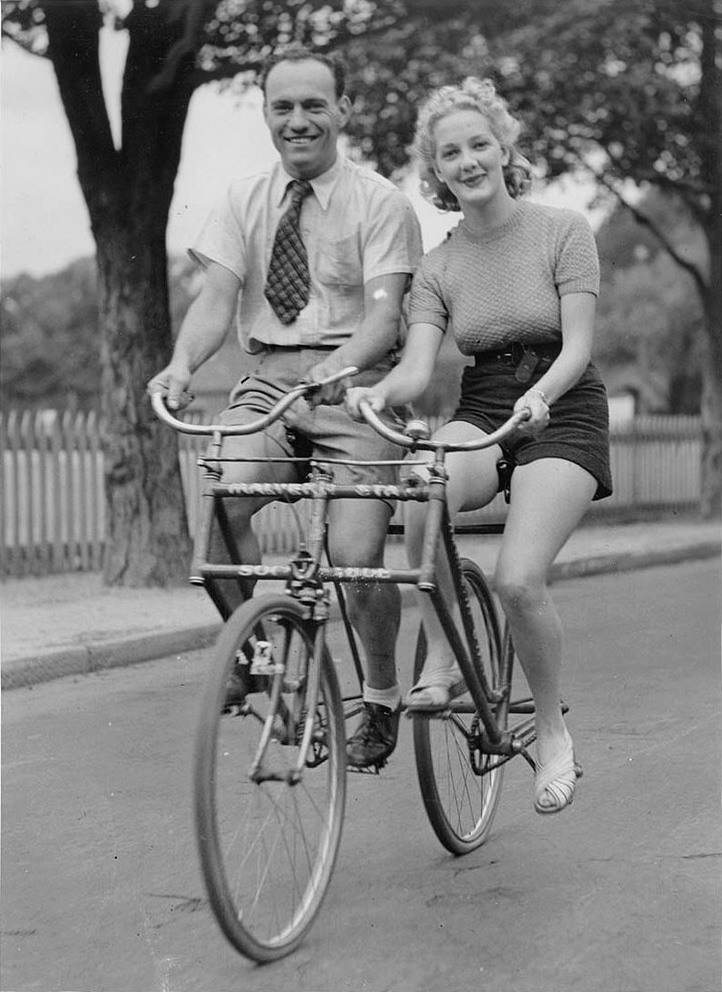
Man and woman on a Malvern Star sociable, c. 1930s

Small began a successful credit scheme, revolutionary at the time, to increase sales. The retail business expanded in 1923 to Gardenvale, and in 1925, the headquarters moved to Prahran. In 1928 a team comprising three Australians, Hubert Opperman, Percy Osborn and Ernest Bainbridge and one New Zealander Harry Watson entered the Tour De France. Although they rode French bikes Malvern Star released a Tour De France model in recognition of their efforts. This model incorporated lessons learnt on the Tour including tubular tyres and wingnuts to attach the wheels.

With the Second World War, the supply of bicycle parts became scarce, so Malvern Star started manufacturing its own. Defence contracts helped growth of the business. At its peak after the war, Malvern Star had 115 stores with 1,000 dealers. Opperman helped promote Malvern Star and make both a household name in Australia.

After the war, Small's Malvern Star bicycles were ridden by Sid Patterson, who won the world sprint championship in Copenhagen in 1949, the world pursuit championship in Liège (1950), the professional pursuit in Paris (1952) and professional pursuit in Zurich (1953). At the 1956 Summer Olympics in Melbourne, Ian Browne and Tony Marchant won a gold medal on a Malvern Star tandem.

The Malvern Star factory was located on the corner of Clarendon Street and Normanby Road in South Melbourne which is now the site of the Melbourne Conference and Exhibition Centre just opposite Crown Casino. Attached to the Malvern Star Factory was a Malvern Star Cycle Shop. Small employed John (Jack) Lee to manage the South Melbourne store from 1950 to the late 1960s. Lee went on to establish several Malvern Star cycle shops for Small in Sydney Road Coburg, Elizabeth Street Melbourne, Sydney Road Brunswick and went on to support many of Bruce Small's suburban and country Malvern Star dealers. In 1959 the Hollywood movie 'On the Beach' was filmed in Melbourne. John Lee was approached by the producers of the film to provide a number of bicycles to be used in a particular scene in Melbourne's CBD. John Lee and his wife Lauris rode Malvern Star bicycles as extras in that scene in the movie and also in the crowd scene on the steps of Melbourne's State Library.

In the late 1960s, Malvern Star manufactured the Dragstar line of dragster bikes (sometimes referred to in other countries as wheelie bikes). The Dragstar has since been commemorated with a postage stamp issued by Australia Post on 25 September 2009.

Malvern Star was sold to Electronic Industries in 1958 then in 1970 the brand was purchased by the Dutch multinational Philips, which sold Malvern Star in 1980 to Raleigh (all Australian bicycle building by the company ending in 1987, however most Malvern Stars were imported after 1970). Changes in ownership of Raleigh's parent company led to Malvern Star returning to Australian ownership in 1992 under Pacific Brands. After struggling with low profitability, Pacific Brands finally sold the business to New Zealand's Sheppard Cycles in August 2011.

== See also ==
- List of Australian bicycle brands and manufacturers
