= Dunlop Grand Prix =

1927 cycle race in Victoria, Australia

Dunlop Grad Prix
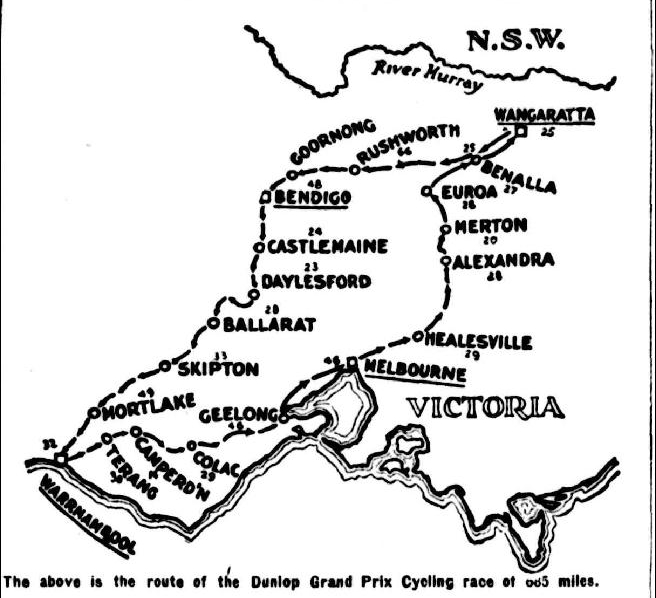
- Each stage and town of the route

Race details
- Date: 20–27 October 1927
- Region: Victoria, Australia
- Type: Stage race

The Dunlop Grand Prix was, in 1927, the biggest cycling race in the British Empire and the richest race in the world. It was organised by the Dunlop Rubber Company which had a long history of organising bicycle races, including the Warrnambool to Melbourne, Colac to Melbourne and Goulburn to Sydney. As a result of the Dunlop Grand Prix, the Warrnambool was not held in 1927 however the Colac and Goulburn races were.

The race was held in four stages from the 14–19 November 1927, with two rest days, covering 690 miles (1,110 km) and a description of the race was broadcast on radio station 3LO. At that time the title of Long Distance Road Champion of Australasia was awarded to the fastest time in the Warrnambool and for 1927 the title was awarded to the fastest time in the Dunlop Grand Prix. There was a dispute between the League of Victorian Wheelmen and Melbourne Carnivals Ltd which threatened the participation of a number of cyclists, including Hubert Opperman. The dispute however was resolved a month before the event. (Note: The resolution of the dispute was controversial with a large number of riders boycotting the Victorian 75 miles (121 km) road title, with just 56 of the original 176 nominated riders facing the starter.)

The featured riders, in addition to Opperman were Percy Osborn, Jack Beasley, then holder of the 100 miles (160 km) world's record, Harry Moody, NSW and Harry Watson from New Zealand. Also competing were the winners of the Warrnambool from 1926, Les Einsiedel, 1925 Esmond Williamson, and 1924 winner WF King his father, 47-year-old WA "Buffer" King. The fastest riders from the Goulburn to Sydney were also competing, with Ken Ross from 1926 and RJ Cruise from 1925. The riders started together on the first 3 stages however on the final stage the riders left according to their accumulated time gains. In addition to the time prize, there was also a sealed handicap and a teams championship for interstate and country riders.

== Race conditions ==
The late 20s and early 30s were an era of transition in relation to bicycle equipment and race conditions. Areas of controversy were the use of variable gears and two sprocket wheels, (Note: The use of variable gears continued to be controversial into the 30s.) single tyres, the use of butterfly or wing nuts (Note: A wingnut or butterfly replaced the nut on the axle and was used to change wheels without the need for tools. The use of wingnuts declined with development of the quick release skewer.) and the provision of outside assistance. The Dunlop Grand Prix permitted variable gears but prohibited butterfly or wing nuts and singles. The riders were required to repair their own bikes during the stage, were not able to change bicycles unless it was bona fide damaged (Note: There was controversy in the 1926 Goulburn to Sydney when Fatty Lamb punctured and swapped bikes with a competitor.) and no spare parts or other assistance were permitted. Similarly the riders were not permitted to accept food or drink other than from officials at feeding stations or procured by rider from established store, hotel or refreshment room. (Note: Horrie Marshall was initially disqualified in the 1929 Warrnambool for accepting a drink, although the disqualification was overturned on appeal.)

== Stages ==
=== Stage 1: Melbourne – Wangaratta ===
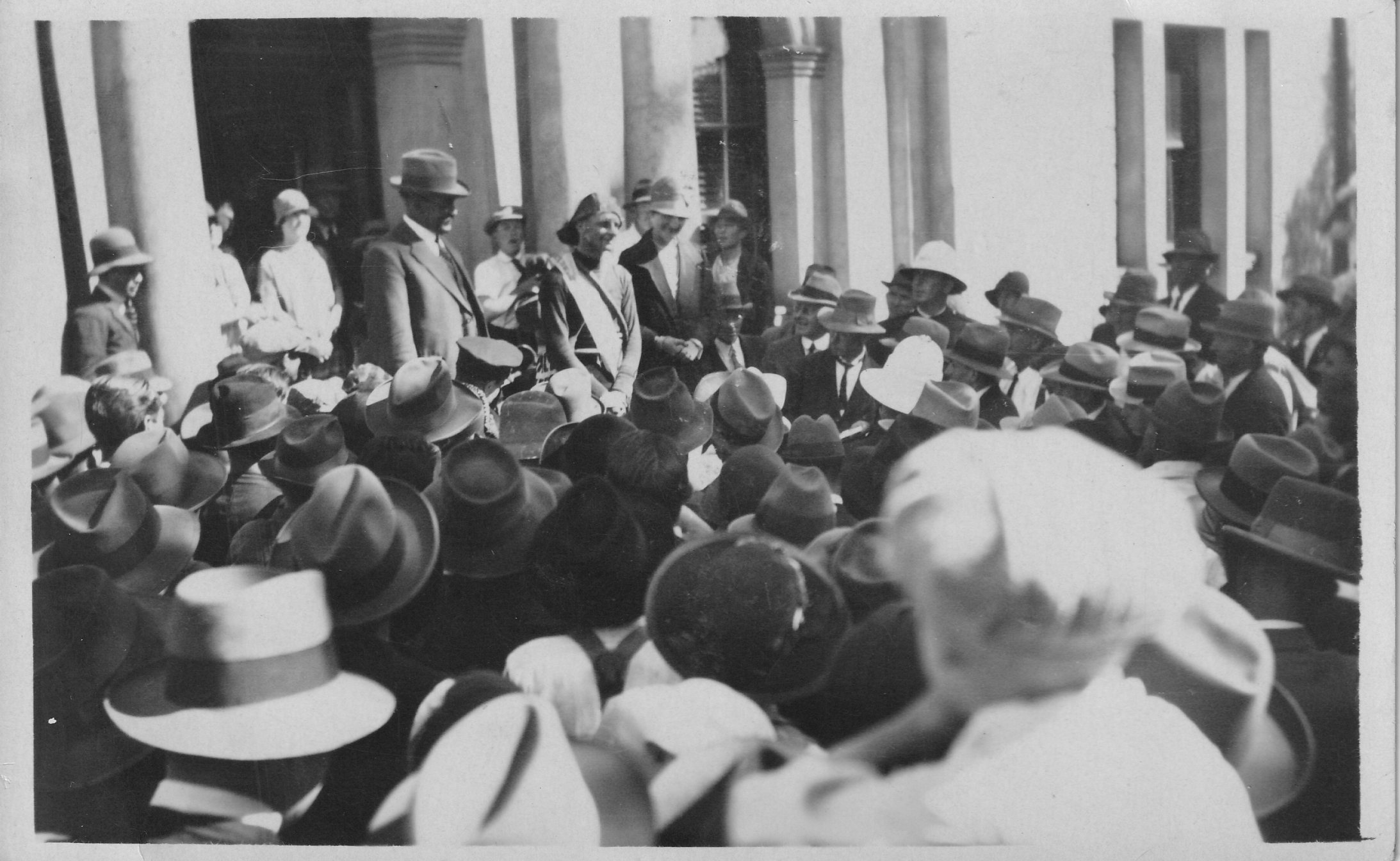
Cr George Handley, Mayor and Hubert Opperman in Wangaratta, 15 Nov 1927 after Opperman won the first stage of the Dunlop Grand Prix

Stage 1 on Monday 14 November 1927 was 183 miles (295 km) from Melbourne to Wangaratta and was described by Iddo "Snowy" Munro, the former Tour de France rider, as the toughest race set for road riders in Australia and before the stage Snowy predicted that only 25 or 30 would complete the stage. While the pre race reports spoke of a limit of 110 riders, 59 riders faced the starter, and 52 finished. Opperman was in the lead from Healesville for the hardest climb of the stage, the Blacks Spur. Einsiedel caught Opperman on the downhill run from Narbethong to Buxton. Opperman dropped Einsiedel at Alexandra while Watson overtook Einsiedel at Benalla. The stage was won by Opperman in convincing style, 50 minutes in front of the expected time and with a 15-minute lead over second placed Watson.

The time limit for the stage was 12h 35' and 35 riders were within the time. The last rider in was N Coates who walked the last 5 miles so he could finish, albeit 4 hours after Opperman, 1 hour 40 minutes outside the time limit. It appears the time limit was not enforced however as all 52 finishers were reported as starting stage 2.

Stage 1 result
	Rider	Time
1	Hubert Opperman, Vic	10h 09' 12"
2	Harry Watson (NZ)	+15' 43"
3	Les Einsiedel, Vic	+30' 05"
4	Ernest Bainbridge, Vic	+30' 05"
5	Doug Anderson, Vic	+34' 26"
6	Harry Moody, NSW	+46' 58"

=== Stage 2: Wangaratta – Bendigo ===
52 riders faced the started for Stage 2 on Wednesday 16 November 1927 for the shortest stage of the race covering a distance of 150.5 miles (242.2 km). The time limit for the stage was 10h 55' Opperman punctured after winning the sprint at Shepparton and was 8 minutes behind the leader Moody at Rushworth with 50 miles (80 km) left in the stage. Despite riding into a hot north west wind, Opperman caught Moody between Wanalta and Colbinabbin, before dropping him 8 miles (13 km) from Bendigo and gaining a further 5 minutes lead on Moody by the finish. Osborn recovered from his disappointing 22nd in stage 1 to finish 3rd a further 7 minutes back.

Stage 2 result
	Rider	Time
1	Hubert Opperman, Vic	8h 45' 08"
2	Harry Moody, NSW	+05' 24"
3	Percy Osborn, Vic	+12' 28"
4	Doug Anderson, Vic	+12' 28"
5	W H Goldsmith, Vic	+26' 09"
6	William Rennie (NZ)	+26' 09"

Standings after stage 2
	Rider	Time
1	Hubert Opperman, Vic	18h 54' 20"
2	Harry Watson (NZ)	+44' 53"
3	Doug Anderson, Vic	+46' 54"
4	Harry Moody, NSW	+52' 22"
5	Ernest Bainbridge, Vic	+59' 15"
6	William Rennie (NZ)	+1h 17' 18"

=== Stage 3: Bendigo – Warrnambool ===
Stage 3 was held on Thursday 17 November 1927, covering 192 miles (309 km) with a time limit for the stage of 12h 15'. This was always expected to be the toughest stage of the race, however it was made even harder by a strong headwind for the final 100 miles (160 km)from Scarsdale to Warrnambool. Even the leading riders were 1 h 15' outside the time limit. Yet again Opperman won the stage, however Watson, Osborn and Bainbridge finished on the same time. Teddy Rodgers, in addition to punctures fell twice with severe abrasions to his hands and legs. He ultimately finished the stage in 20h 10', long outside the time limit. Again the time limit was not enforced and he was able to ride the final stage.

Stage 3 result
	Rider	Time
1	Hubert Opperman, Vic	8h 45' 08"
2	Harry Watson (NZ)	+00"
3	Percy Osborn, Vic	+00"
4	Ernest Bainbridge, Vic	+00"
5	Les Einsiedel, Vic	+22' 02"
6	Roy Anderson, Vic	+21' 32"

Standings after stage 3
	Rider	Time
1	Hubert Opperman, Vic	32h 26' 35"
2	Harry Watson (NZ)	+44' 53"
3	Ernest Bainbridge, Vic	+59' 15"
4	William Rennie (NZ)	+1h 38' 20"
5	Les Einsiedel, Vic	+1h 50' 46"
6	Percy Osborn, Vic	+2h 00' 41"

=== Stage 4: Warrnambool – Melbourne ===
The final stage on Saturday 19 November 1927 was the traditional route from Warrnambool to Melbourne covering 165 miles (266 km) with a time limit of 10h 30'. The finish of the race was at the Royal Agricultural Society's Showgrounds, Flemington. An unusual feature of the stage was that the leading riders left according to their accumulated time gains, while the 20 riders at the end of the field started together, with the balance of their time to be added at the end.

The Referee described the final stage as a hollow victory for Opperman, in that, with a 45-minute start over second place Watson, only a serious accident could have prevented him winning. That assessment may be harsh given Opperman's form in the previous 3 stages and that his time on stage 4 was 26 minutes faster the Bainbridge in 2nd. The Sporting Globe reported that Opperman looked tired and stayed 1 minute at Colac, while the Australasian reported that Opperman finished "perfectly fresh". The last rider to finish was Teddy Rodgers who had lost so much time on stage 3.

Stage 4 result
	Rider	Time
1	Hubert Opperman, Vic	8h 14' 59"
2	Ernest Bainbridge, Vic	+26' 31"
3	Harry Watson (NZ)	+35' 58"
4	Les Einsiedel, Vic	+42' 38"
5	William Rennie (NZ)	+44' 40"
6	Percy Osborn, Vic	+47' 06"

Standings after stage 4
	Rider	Time
1	Hubert Opperman, Vic	40h 41' 34"
2	Harry Watson (NZ)	+1h 20' 51"
3	Ernest Bainbridge, Vic	+1h 25' 47"
4	Les Einsiedel, Vic	+2h 23' 24"
5	William Rennie (NZ)	+2h 24' 00"
6	Percy Osborn, Vic	+2h 47' 47"

Teams Championship
	Team	Rider	Rider	Time
1	New Zealand	Harry Watson (NZ)	William Rennie (NZ)	84h 57' 19"
2	Koo Wee Rup	Les Einsiedel	Percy Osborn	+1h 37' 00"
3	Tasmania	Roy "Bose" Stamford	Fred Keefe	+6h 05' 00"
4	South Australia	EE McAdam	J Strafford	+10h 26' 02"
5	Gippsland	Tilley George	Charles William Belperroud	+11h 10' 25"
6	Werribee	WA "Buffer" King	J N Pollard	+15h 30' 56"
7	Ballarat	J T Stewart	Jack Stanhope	+20h 48' 09"

Complete Final Results (1-29)
Rider	Championship		Secret Handicap (Note: The first three places were not eligible for the secret handicap.)			Prize
Rider	Pos	Time	Pos	Handicap	Time	Prize
Hubert Opperman, Vic	1	40h 41' 34"	-	Scr	-	£410
Harry Watson (NZ)	2	42h 02' 25"	-	Scr	-	£154
Ernest Bainbridge, Vic	3	42h 07' 21"	-	Scr	-	£64
Les Einsiedel, Vic	4	43h 04' 58"	7	0h 25' 00"	42h 39' 58"	£39 / 10
William Rennie (NZ)	5	43h 05' 34"	1	2h 15' 00"	40h 50' 34"	£115
Percy Osborn, Vic	6	43h 29' 21"	9	Scr	43h 29' 21"	£39 / 10
Harry Moody, NSW	7	43h 37' 37"	11	Scr	43h 37' 37"	£20
Roy "Bose" Stamford, Tas	8	43h 38' 38"	6	1h 30' 00"	42h 08' 38"	
Frank Linton, Vic	9	43h 42' 08"	3	1h 50' 00"	41h 52' 08"	£20
V M Williamson, Vic	10	43h 49' 58"	2	2h 15' 00"	41h 34' 58"	£35
Jimmy Boyd, Vic	11	44h 14' 27"	5	2h 15' 00"	41h 59' 27"	
Jack Jehu, Vic	12	44h 44' 03"	14	Scr	44h 44' 03"	£5
W H Goldsmith, Vic	13	44h 44' 11"	4	2h 45' 00"	41h 59' 11"	£35
G A Wells, Vic	14	45h 25' 59"	8	2h 45' 00"	42h 40' 59"	
Esmond Williamson, Vic	15	45h 55' 57"	12	1h 50' 00"	44h 05' 57"	
A R White, NSW	16	46h 28' 38"	16	1h 30' 00"	44h 58' 38"	
Roy Anderson, Vic	17	46h 51' 27"	18	1h 30' 00"	45h 21' 27"	£3 / 5
Tilley George, Vic	18	47h 15' 47"	10	3h 45' 00"	43h 30' 47"	
J Strafford, SA	19	47h 15' 47"	19	1h 30' 00"	45h 45' 47"	
Fred Keefe, Vic	20	47h 23' 41"	13	2h 45' 00"	44h 38' 41"	£3
Les Willoughby, Vic	21	47h 30' 51"	15	2h 45' 00"	44h 45' 51"	£12 / 10
E E McAdam, SA	22	48h 07' 33"	24	0h 50' 00"	47h 17' 33"	
F Jones, WA	23	48h 29' 01"	23	1h 30' 00"	46h 59' 01"	
Charles William Belperroud, Vic	24	48h 51' 57"	20	2h 45' 00"	46h 06' 57"	
W A King, Vic	25	49h 18' 07"	17	4h 15' 00"	45h 03' 07"	
J N Pollard, Vic	26	51h 10' 08"	22	4h 15' 00"	46h 55' 08"	
J T Stewart, Vic	27	51h 27' 30"	21	4h 40' 00"	46h 47' 30"	
Jack Stanhope, Vic	28	54h 17' 28"	25	3h 45' 00"	50h 32' 28"	
Teddy Rodgers, Qld	29	57h 28' 18"	26	4h 15' 00"	53h 13' 18"	£12 / 10

== Aftermath and following events ==
Jack Campbell, of Melbourne Carnivals Ltd, the company which promoted events at the motordrome hosted a banquet in Opperman's honour. Speaking at the banquet, Mr Harry James, of the Dunlop Rubber Co, announced that he was confident that the Dunlop Grand Prix would be an annual event. This did not come to pass and the next big stage races were not until 1930 with the Sydney to Melbourne and the Tour of Tasmania. A similar event to the Dunlop Grand Prix was not held until 1934 and the staging of the Centenary 1000.

One wish that did come true was the sending of Opperman and an Australian team to the Tour de France, funded by a public subscription, organised by the Sporting Globe. Writing after the Dunlop Grand Prix, Opperman paid tribute to 3 riders, Watson, Bainbridge and Osborn and these were the riders selected to travel with him to France.
