= Sociable =

Two-person bicycle with side by side seating

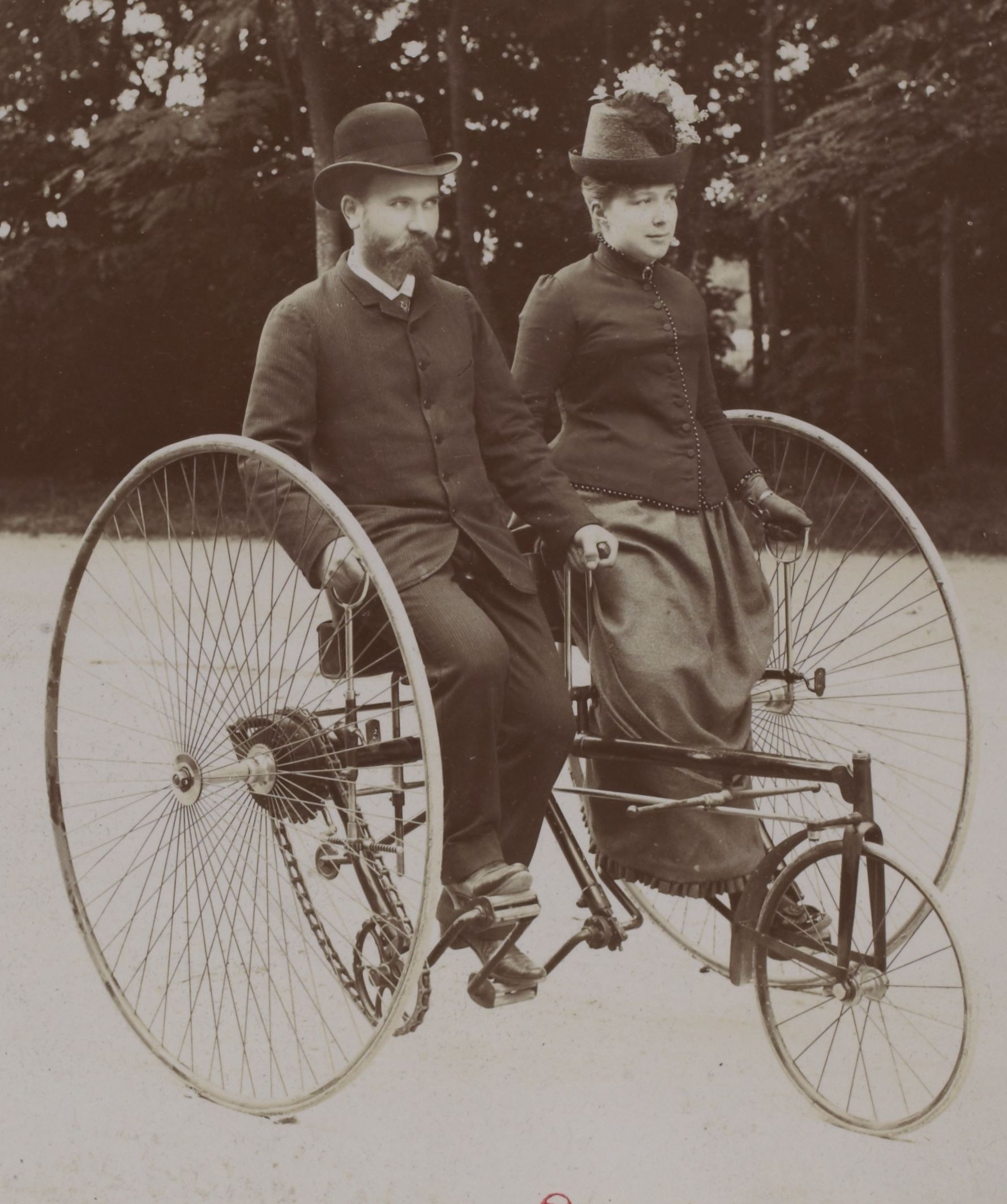
Adolphe Clément and his wife riding a sociable tricycle, c.1895

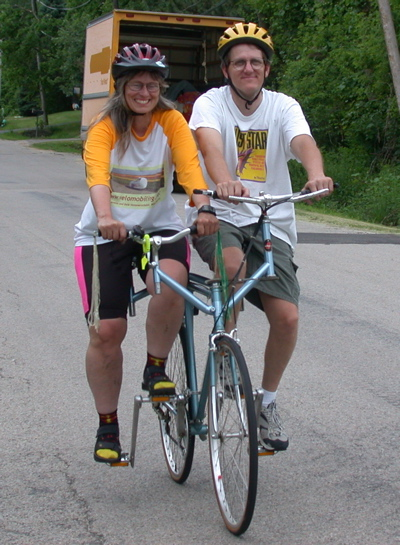
Two people riding a sociable

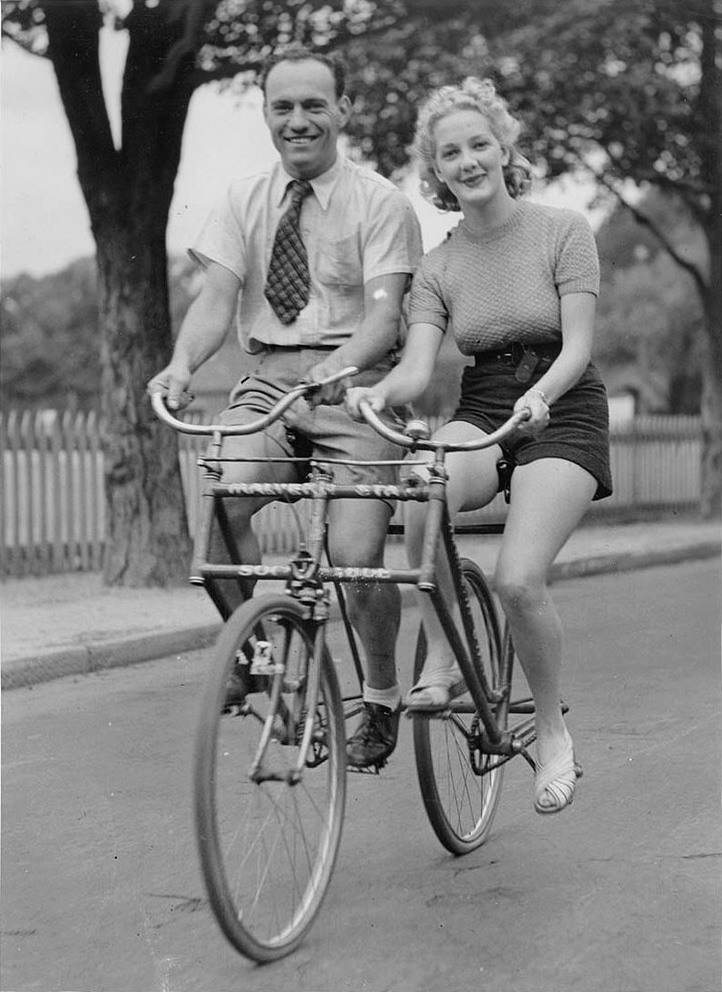
Malvern Star sociable from the 1930s

The sociable or buddy bike or side by side bicycle is a bicycle that supports two riders who sit next to one another, in contrast to a tandem bicycle, where the riders sit fore and aft. The name "sociable" alludes to its historic use for 2-person side-by-side tricycles and the relative ease with which the two cyclists can speak with each other, unlike on the tandem.

== History ==
Bicycling through Time by Paul and Charlie Farren has a picture of a sociable with a frame under each rider and two wheels between them from 1897. The Ford Museum in Detroit has a similar sociable on display. More modern single framed sociables may have started with Australian cyclist Hubert Opperman, although in its basic form the design has been around for longer, since the end of the 19th century. It was originally marketed by the Punnett Cycle Company. Historically it has been used as a courting bike; gentlemen would be able to spend time with ladies in an activity that allowed proximity.

== Present day ==
For several years the Taiwanese "Buddy Bike" sociable was available on eBay. There are currently no commercially available sociable two-wheelers, although there are plans in circulation by which a person with welding and metal fabrication skills could make one. There are some sociable three- and four-wheeled machines (quadracycles) on the market, however.

== See also ==
- Outline of cycling
