= Miguel Ortega =

Miguel Ortega may refer to:

- Miguel Ortega (pentathlete) (1908-1996), Mexican pentathlete
- Miguel Ortega (footballer) (born 1995), Mexican footballer
