= Hubert Opperman =

Australian racing cyclist

The Honourable Sir Hubert Opperman OBE
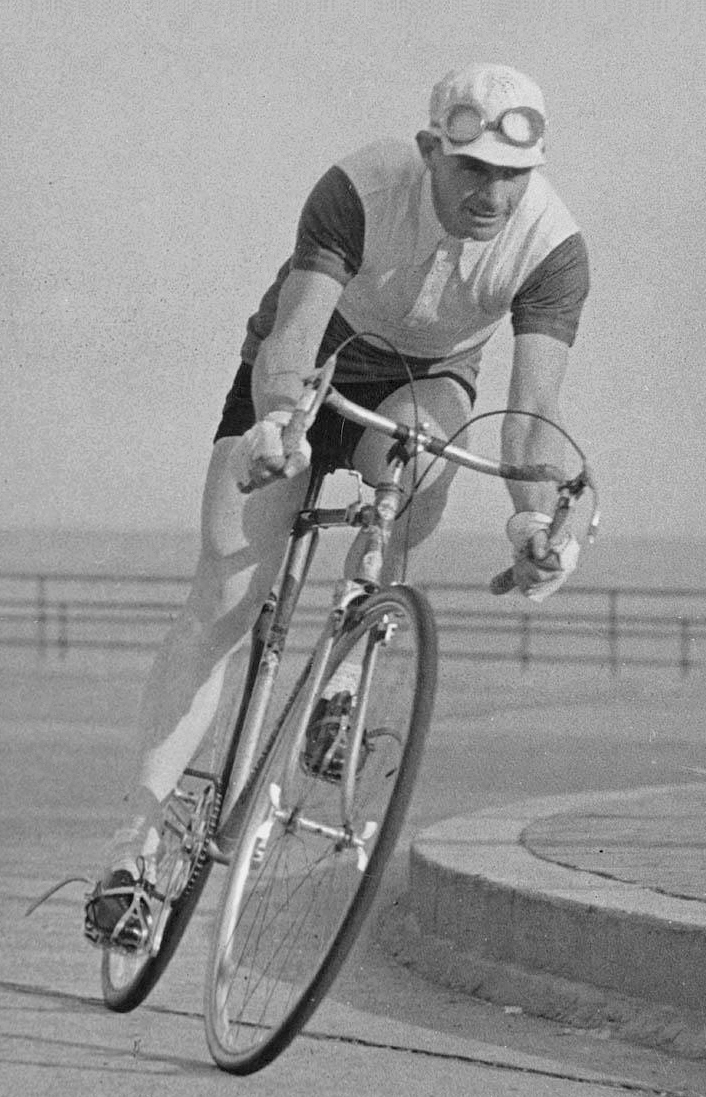

Personal information
- Nickname: Oppy
- Born: Hubert Ferdinand Oppermann; 29 May 1904 Rochester, Victoria, Australia
- Died: 18 April 1996 (aged 91) Wantirna, Victoria, Australia

Cycling career
- Sport: Cycling
- Disciplines: Road & Track
- Role: Rider
- Rider type: Endurance

Sir Hubert Ferdinand Opperman, OBE (29 May 1904 – 18 April 1996), referred to as Oppy by Australian and French crowds, was an Australian cyclist and politician, whose endurance cycling feats in the 1920s and 1930s earned him international acclaim.

Hubert rode a bicycle from the age of eight until his 90th birthday, when his wife Mavys, fearing for his health and safety, forced him to stop. His stamina and endurance in cycling earned Opperman the status of one of the greatest Australian sportsmen.

== Early life ==
Opperman was born on 29 May 1904 in Rochester, Victoria. He was the eldest of five children born to Bertha (née Reddie) and Adolphus Samuel Ferdinand Oppermann. His parents were both born in Victoria, with his father of German descent.

Opperman's father had worked as a butcher, miner, timber-cutter and coach driver. Hubert, the eldest of five children, learned as a child to plough with six horses and to ride bareback. He attended several schools and delivered Post Office telegrams by bicycle. Some time following Hubert's birth, his parents moved to Western Australia, along with his uncle Albert Oppermann and his father's cousins August, Emil and Hugo Oppermann. (Hubert's grandfather, Otto Friedrich Oppermann, was one of three brothers who migrated to South Australia as miners in the 1850s; two brothers remained in South Australia, while Otto came to Victoria). Hubert's sister Winifred was born in Western Australia in 1907; after that the family moved back to Victoria where Hubert's twin siblings Bertha Ellen and Otto Alexander were born in 1910, followed by younger brother Bruce some years later. Bruce also became a competitive cyclist, and won several regional races in Victoria. It is not known when, or why, Hubert anglicised his surname and dropped one 'n' from its end.

Opperman attended schools in Baillieston, Ten Mile and Benalla. His father enlisted in the Australian Army in World War I and he was sent to live with his paternal grandmother in Melbourne, where he completed his education in Glen Iris. He left school at the age of 14.

== Cycling career ==
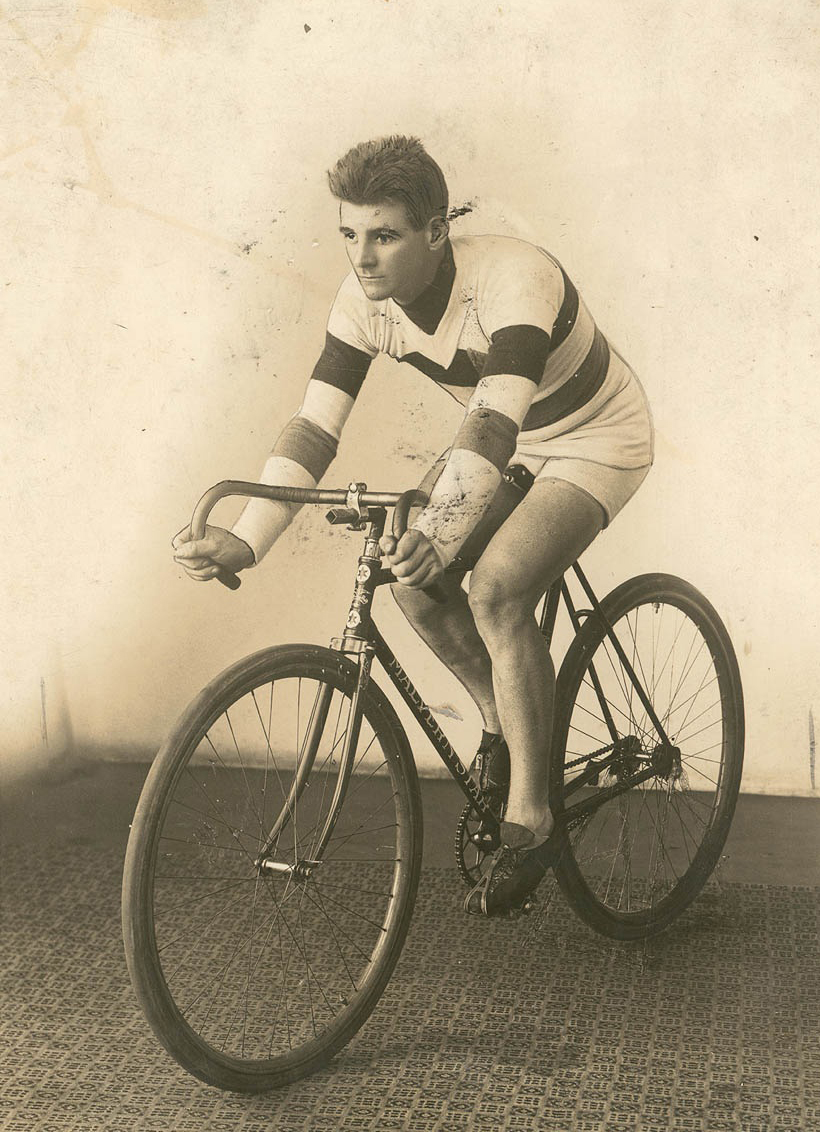
Hubert Opperman, cyclist, Australia, ca. 1925

He came third in a cycling race at 17 in 1921. The prize was a racing bike by Malvern Star Cycles, a cycle shop in the Melbourne suburb of Malvern. The proprietor, Bruce Small, was so impressed he offered Opperman a role in the business, which helped turn both into household names in Australia.

Opperman is the only male rider to have won the Australian national road race title four times, in 1924, 1926, 1927 and 1929. The 1924, 1926 and 1929 titles were awarded for winning the Blue Riband for fastest time in the Warrnambool to Melbourne Classic. In 1927 the Warrnambool to Melbourne was not run and the title was won by Opperman as the winner of the Dunlop Grand Prix, a 690.5 miles (1,111.3 km) race over four stages.

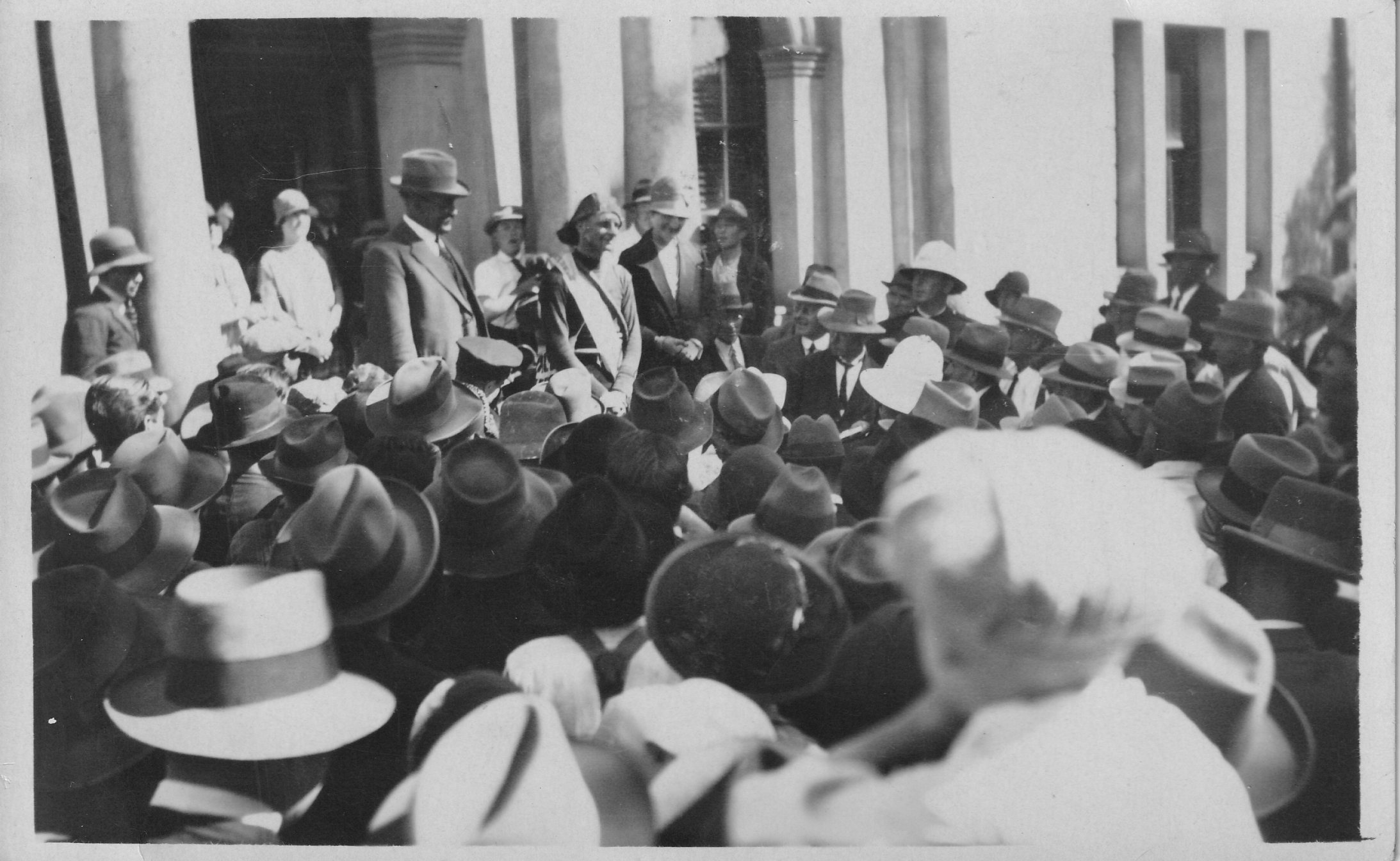
Cr George Handley, Mayor and Hubert Opperman in Wangaratta, 15 November 1927 after Opperman won the first stage of the Dunlop Grand Prix

In the Goulburn to Sydney Classic Opperman was first and fastest in 1924 and 1929 and was fastest in 1930 setting a new race record.

Opperman was critical of the handicap races then prevalent in Australian cycling Opperman's plea for scratch racing was partially met in 1934 in the Centenary 1000, a one-week road bicycle race over seven stages covering 1,102 miles (1,773 km). The championship was based solely on time, although there was also a handicap race with riders divided into 4 grades. The race was run in as part of the celebrations of the Centenary of Victoria. Opperman had injured his knee in a fall in stage 4 near Wangaratta, but despite this he was still well placed at 3rd in the championship. He injured his knee again in a fall whilst descending from Mount Hotham. Opperman also cut his hand requiring stitches, which he refused until after the stage. He battled on to Sale, losing 27 minutes on the stage to Lamb. He attempted to finish the race, but was forced to abandon at Traralgon, said to be the first time Oppy had retired from a race.

== 1928 Tour de France ==
The Melbourne Herald and The Sporting Globe in Australia and The Sun in New Zealand started a fund in late 1927 to pay for an Australasia team to the Tour de France. Opperman went to Europe in April 1928 with Harry Watson of New Zealand and Ernie Bainbridge and Percy Osborn of Australia. He went to the six-day race at the Velodrome d'Hiver in Paris, where he met an Australian participant, Reggie McNamara. The Franco-American writer René de Latour, who was working for McNamara at the six-day, wrote:

A marked difference between Oppy and his team-mates was that they did not all regard the journey to Europe in the same light. While the others looked on it more as a trip in which to collect a few souvenirs to take home, to the eager Oppy it was a wonderful chance to reach the top in international competition... His arrival in France had been announced with some scepticism: Un beau mentir qui vient de loin is a French saying. (A good lie comes from a distance.) His outstanding wins in Australia did not mean anything to the French riders, and even less to the Belgians.
'Whom did he beat over there, anyway?' they would say. 'Let's see him on the road, then we'll know. We've yet to see any classy Australian road rider.'

Opperman joined a training camp run by Paul Ruinart, trainer of the Vélo Club Levallois, on the outskirts of Paris. Ruinart and the VC Levallois were at the peak of French cycling and took in Opperman and his team. They rode Paris-Rennes as their first race. A report says:

The 32 riders assembled at a small Parisian café at midnight. On the street outside, torrential rain alternated with freezing hailstorms. When called outside for the 2am start, the riders kept warm by running on the spot and flapping their arms. The Australians amused the others with a game of leapfrog followed by a sparring match between Watson and Bainbridge.

Nicolas Frantz of Luxembourg won and Opperman came eighth. Opperman then came third to Georges Ronsse of Belgium and to Frantz in Paris-Brussels.

The Tour de France started one month later. The shortest day was 119 km and the longest 387 km. Other teams had 10 riders but the Australasia squad had four, plans to increase the team with Europeans having failed. Their position was worsened by Henri Desgrange's plan to run most of the race as a team time trial, as he had the previous year. Teams started at intervals and shared the pace until the end. Desgrange wanted to stop riders racing casually for all but the last hour. The American historian Bill McGann wrote:

Desgrange... wanted the Tour de France to be a contest where unrelenting individual effort in the cauldron of intense competition resulted in the supreme test of both the body and will of the athlete. Desgrange was convinced that the teams were combining to fix the outcome of the race. At the very best, even if they were honest, they helped a weaker rider do well. He also felt that on the flat stages the riders did not push themselves, saving their energy for the mountains.

With four rather than 10 riders to share the pace, Opperman and his team were handicapped. De Latour wrote:

Even if I live to be 150 years old, there is one picture I am sure I shall never forget. It is the sight of the poor lonely Opperman being caught day after day by the various teams of 10 super-athletes, swopping their pace beautifully. The four Australians [sic] would start together. Bainbridge would do his best to hang on, but even though he may have been a good rider in the past, the passing years had taken most of his speed, and he would generally go off the back after 50 miles or so... That left three Aussies against the trade teams' 10. Then, inevitably, if it was not Osborn it was Watson who would have to quit at the 100 miles mark.

Opperman was often swept up by the French Alcyon team. Its manager, Ludo Feuillet, adopted him and helped with advice and tyres. Opperman finished the Tour 18th. He said of the long stages and the hours of darkness that riders endured:

As the bicycle banged and jolted over uneven ground, one yearned for company, for another human whose conversation would share the anxious misery of those uncertain hours. Yes, there it was, a vague outline of a hunched figure swinging and swaying in an effort to find a smooth track. French is the Esperanto of the cycling fraternity, so I ventured some words in that tongue. C'est dur ("It is hard"), but only a grunt came back. For a mile we plugged in silence, then again in French, I tried: 'This Tour – it is very difficult – all are weary.' Once more only a snarling noise returned. 'The boorish oaf,' I thought, 'I'll make the blighter answer.'

'It is very dark, and you are too tired to talk,' I inferred, sarcastically. The tone touched a verbal gusher as a totally unexpected voice bawled, 'Shut up, you Froggie gasbag – I can't understand a flaming word you've been jabbering,' and then I realised that I had been unwittingly riding with Bainbridge.

=== After the 1928 Tour ===
In 1928 Opperman won the Bol d'Or 24-hour classic, paced by tandems on a 500m velodrome in Paris. Both his bikes had been sabotaged by the chains being filed so they failed. His manager had to find a replacement, his interpreter's bicycle which had heavy mudguards and wheels and upturned handlebars. Opperman rode the bike for 17 hours without dismounting. He was 17 laps of the track behind the leader but after 10 hours rose to second place to Achille Souchard, who had twice been national road champion.

Opperman punctured after 23½ hours and got off his bike for the first time since the broken chain. "He had met Nature's lesser calls as he pedalled, to the roar of the indelicate crowd", said a report. Opperman won by 30 minutes to the cheers of 50,000 yelling "Allez Oppy". His manager suggested he continue to beat the 1000 km record. Opperman declined but his trainer and the crowd persuaded. He cycled 1h 19m more alone to beat the record.

He became enough of a hero in France that "a gendarme in Montmartre held up the traffic and waved him through in solitary splendour with the cry: "Bonjour, bonne chance, Oppy!" Opperman had a hero's welcome when he returned to Melbourne.

== 1931 Tour de France ==
Opperman rode again in 1931 in a combined Australia/Switzerland team including Fatty Lamb, Ossie Nicholson and Frankie Thomas. Thomas had stomach trouble and did not finish stage 3 while Nicholson broke a crank and was eliminated in stage 4. Opperman finished 12th, suffering from several accidents and dysentery after having occupied sixth place, while Lamb finished in 35th place and was the last finisher.

=== After the 1931 Tour ===
In 1931 Opperman won Paris–Brest–Paris (726 miles, 1166 km) in a record 49 hours 23 minutes despite rain and wind. Paris–Brest–Paris, which became a challenge ride for amateurs, was then the longest race in the world. Opperman said: "In 1931 it had a class field, with two Tour winners, Frantz and Maurice De Waele, as well as Classics winners. We started in the dark and rode into the howling wind and driving rain all the way to Brest. It took us more than 25 hours. Once we had turned there, riders were all over the road with fatigue. Once I had to fend off Frantz when he fell asleep."

Opperman was patron of Audax Australia and Audax UK, organisations encouraging long-distance riding, until his death in 1996. He attended the centenary celebrations of Paris–Brest–Paris in 1991 and received the Gold Medal of the City of Paris. Opperman considered Paris–Brest–Paris his greatest win.

== Records ==
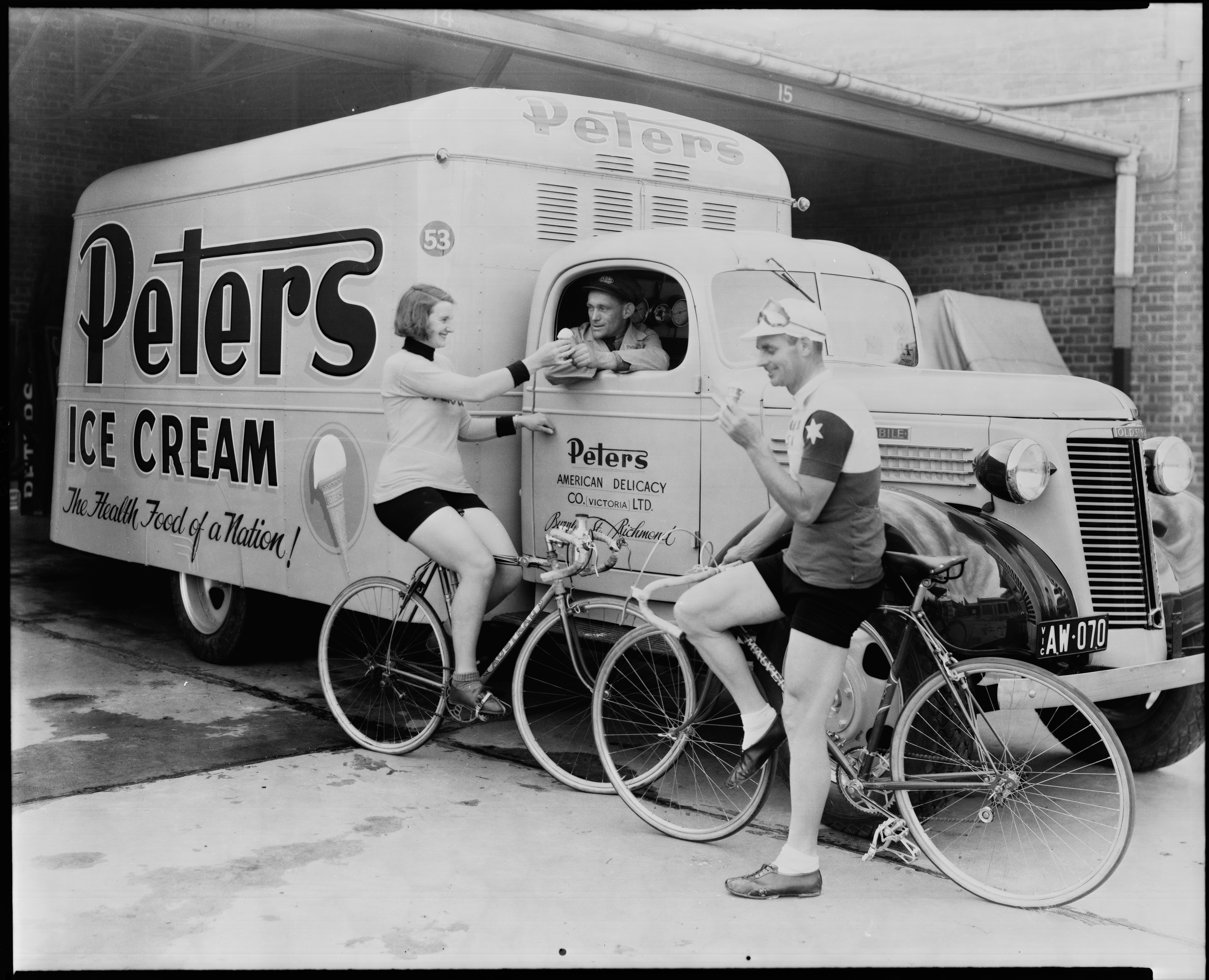
Opperman having ice cream with Valda Unthank. Advertisement for Peters Ice Cream.

Opperman rode for the Malvern Star bicycle company. Malvern Star were agents in Australia for the British BSA factory and BSA sponsored Opperman in the years before the Second World War to break place-to-place and other distance records in Great Britain. He broke Land's End-John o' Groats in 1934 in 2d 9h 1m and then the 1,000-mile record in 3d 1h 52m. He also took London-York in 9h 23m 0s and the 12-hour record after 243 miles.

In 1935 he set the 24-hour record with 461.75 miles and broke London-Bath-London with 10h 14m 42s, Land's End-London with 14h 9m 0s, and shared the tandem record for London-Bath-London with Ern Milliken, in 8h 55m 34s. He broke London-Portsmouth-London in 1937 with 6h 33m 30s. In each case he had to wear not the cycling clothes he wore elsewhere but a black jacket and black tights that reached to his shoes. They were required by the Road Records Association to make riders "inconspicuous." During the 1935 trip to Europe Opperman, Milliken and Hefty Stuart went to Belgium for the 1935 UCI Road World Championships, where Opperman finished 8th.

In 1940 Opperman set 100 distance records in a 24-hour race at Sydney. Many were not broken until decades later.

In 1937 Opperman set a record fastest time of 13 days, 10 hours and 11 minutes for the 2,875 miles transcontinental crossing from Fremantle to Sydney, over long stretches of rutted tracks and through soft sand where he had to carry his bicycle in searing heat. Sometimes he fell asleep while riding, and crashed. His time of just over 13 days cut five days off the record, and other records fell by the score.

Opperman recalled: "At one point, by the light of the car behind me, I could see a large snake in the wheel ruts, and I couldn't stop. All I could do was land the bike on top of it, hard. I suppose I must have killed it. Then, at Nanwarra Sands, I had to pick up the bike and carry it for 10 miles in the soft sand. We learned that I could gain time by sleeping for only 10 minutes at a time, something I have never forgotten."

== Anti-doping stance ==
Opperman was widely known for his vocal opposition to doping and illegal drugs being used by athletes attempting to gain a competitive advantage, a practice he labelled as “vicious”.

Despite racing and competing in an era where doping in sport was considered to be available to most athletes and prevalent within sections of the world’s cycling community, Opperman was never the subject of any credible or formal accusation or investigation for doping and the taking of illegal substances.

As an advocate for natural athleticism over artificial enhancement, Opperman often cited the benefits of healthy diet, physical training, rest and preparedness in maximising a cyclist's endurance and competitive edge.

1932 Australian Olympic team masseur, Edwin Gill, called Hubert Opperman "one great antagonist of doping” and said that, along with fellow champion rider Duncan Gray, they opposed the practice of doping. When referencing that some cyclists’ trainers might have secretly added dope to a riders’ intake, Gill noted that Opperman would never participate. Gill recounted: "In Europe, he [Opperman] threatened to sack trainers if they indulged in the practice [of doping their riders]."

Towards the end of his cycling career, Opperman was adamant cyclists who took drugs were disadvantaging themselves, and that many clean champion riders were unfairly accused of taking drugs by their less successful opponents. In 1939 Opperman stated:

A beaten rider who has seen a rival make some extraordinary effort is often inclined to give himself a let out in his own mind by saying the other fellow must have been doped […] you cannot perform consistently if you dope, because a doped man takes more out of himself than nature would allow him to do. You can't thwart nature. There must be some compensation.

In Russell Mockridge’s posthumous autobiography, My World On Wheels, Mockridge wrote that he believed ‘strong stimulants’ were used by cycling champions in their era, but conceded that the great champions, including Hubert Opperman, realised the dangers [of drugs and doping] and would not "dare depend on them”. Mockridge states that caring for and feeding a cyclist’s body with proper food and providing it sufficient rest from the rigours of professional cycling was the key to these men becoming great champions with longevity in their sport. Mockridge, a fellow Australian and Victorian champion cyclist, said of Opperman and the great drug-free champions:

Men who treat themselves this way are the champions whose reign will be a long one — Bartali, Coppi, Volpi, Bini and Magni of Italy; Geminiani Bobet, Gerardin and Vietto of France; Van Vliet, Derksen, Van Kempen and Schulte of Holland; Scherens, Van Steenbergen and, until he was killed, Ockers, of Belgium; Harris of England, Opperman and Strom of Australia.

In 1990 Opperman continued to be outspoken against doping and illegal drug taking in sport when addressing the Sport Australia Hall Of Fame awards lunch, held at the Melbourne Cricket Ground. On the topic of athletes potentially doping to cheat at the upcoming 1992 Olympic Games, he told the members and inductees:

The use of drugs is a vicious practice [...] personally I would circulate expert medical opinions concerning its adverse effects to every competitor, demand they sign it as read and understood and then if they are tested positive, suspend them for life. Fame is something which must be won. Honour is something which must not be lost.

In the official biography Sir Bruce Small: From Malvern Star To Mr Gold Coast by Rachel Syers, Hubert Opperman's late son, Ian Opperman, stated:

One thing I wish to make quite clear is that Bruce Small [Hubert Opperman’s manager] and my father would never sanction the use of drugs and stimulants during their time together. Some authors have insinuated that my father received ‘help’ from sources never named and offer no proof that this occurred. My father was quoted in his own book, saying ‘there is no sporting prize worth the use of drugs and stimulants’. In 1995 Griffith University awarded my father an Honorary Doctorate in Health and Psychology and in 2014 he was named Australian Tour de France Team Captain of the Century. These honours would not have been awarded had there been any question of drug involvement.

Daniel Oakman, a Senior Curator at the National Museum of Australia and historian was clear when describing Opperman’s healthy habits. Oakman said Opperman was viewed admirably for his ‘athletic virtue’ and that his ‘performance enhancement’ beverage of choice was simply coffee and a herbal brew as potent as a cup of tea or piece of chocolate. In 2021 Oakman attested:

Abstemious (he neither drank nor smoked), disciplined, and unpretentious, Oppy was seen as a paragon of athletic virtue. His sports beverage of choice was coffee and the South American herbal brew called Yerba maté, which had the same stimulating effect as tea and chocolate.

== End of cycling career ==
Opperman's career ended with World War II when he joined the Royal Australian Air Force. He served from 1940 to 1945 and rose to flight lieutenant. He raced briefly after the war but retired in 1947.

== Politics ==
The Honourable Sir Hubert Opperman OBE

Minister for Immigration
- In office 18 December 1963 – 14 December 1966
- Prime Minister: Sir Robert Menzies; Harold Holt
- Preceded by: Sir Alick Downer
- Succeeded by: Billy Snedden

Minister for Shipping and Transport
- In office 5 February 1960 – 18 December 1963
- Prime Minister: Sir Robert Menzies
- Preceded by: Shane Paltridge
- Succeeded by: Sir Gordon Freeth

Member of the Australian Parliament for Corio
- In office 10 December 1949 – 10 June 1967
- Preceded by: John Dedman
- Succeeded by: Gordon Scholes

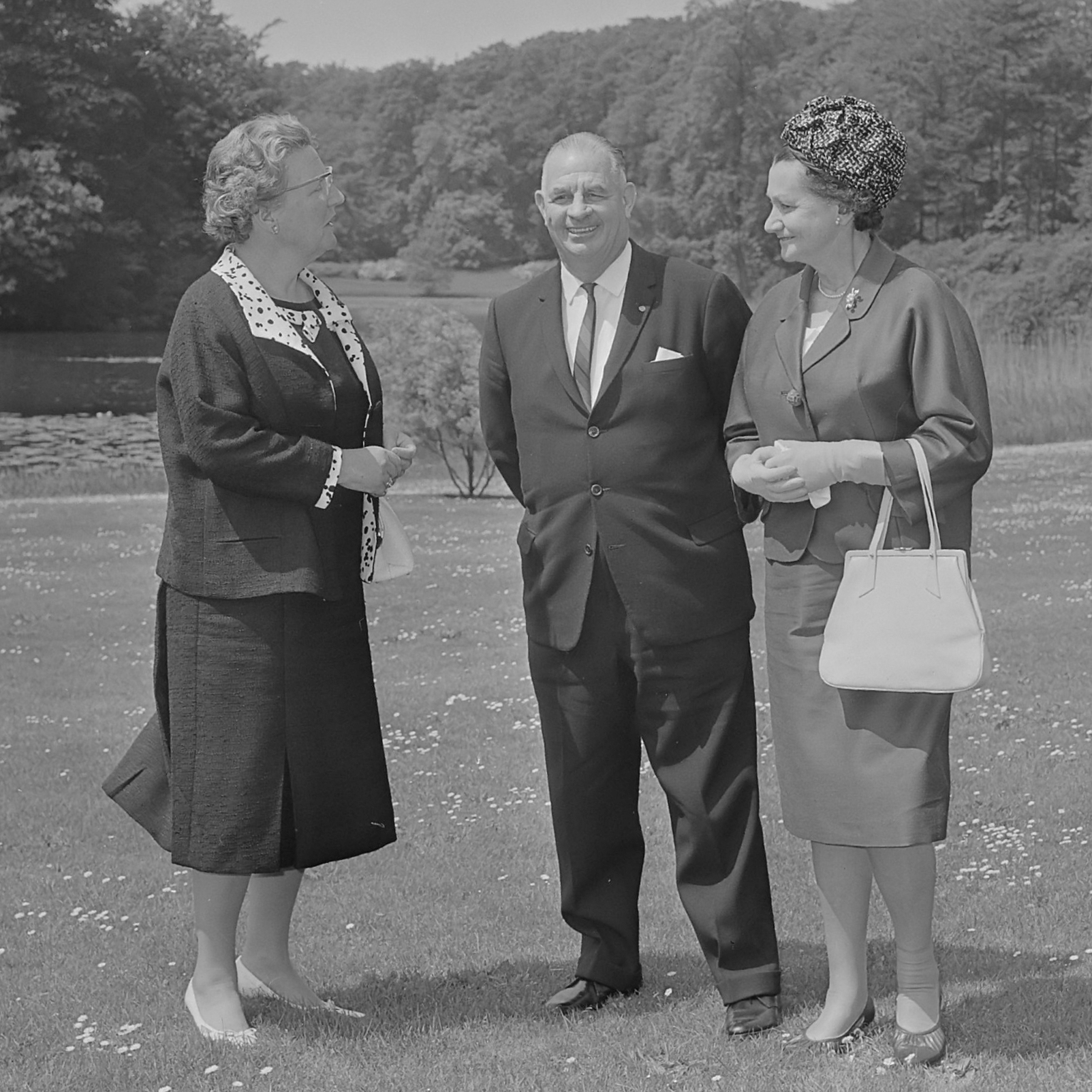
Hubert Opperman, Minister for Immigration, and his wife, visiting Queen Juliana of the Netherlands (1965)

Opperman joined the Liberal Party of Australia after the war and in 1949 was elected to the Parliament of Australia for the Victorian electorate of Corio centred on Geelong. He beat a senior Labor minister, J. J. Dedman and held the seat for 17 years before appointment to High Commissioner for Malta.

He became the Government Whip in 1955. He was appointed Minister for Shipping and Transport, a Cabinet position, in 1960. Between December 1963 and December 1966 he was Minister for Immigration (retaining the position when Harold Holt succeeded Sir Robert Menzies as Prime Minister). He oversaw a relaxation of conditions for entry into Australia of people of mixed descent and a widening of eligibility for well-qualified people. One assessment said: "He was the perfect party man: unswervingly loyal, safe with secrets, an honest adviser and a shoulder for fellow ministers to cry on, sometimes literally. He made no pretence of statesmanship."

The assessment added:

He found the [opposition] Labor Party's socialist platform of the day too close to communism to allow any compromise. His dedication to hard work left him with little sympathy for organised labour in any form, and probably inspired one of his campaign slogans 'Opperman for the Working Man.' His autobiography, Pedals, Politics and People (1977), showed that – like his political idol, Menzies – he was a lover of tradition, European pageantry, and decorous manners. He never quite forgave Harold Macmillan for forgetting, during a visit to Corio, to give proper thanks for a rug specially woven by local mills in the Macmillan tartan.

In 1963 Opperman faced off against future Prime Minister Bob Hawke as the Labor candidate in Corio.

Going against the national trend which saw the Coalition Government reelected with an increased majority, Hawke halved Opperman's majority to 3.3%. Despite this Opperman did not have a rematch with Hawke when Opperman was reelected in Corio for the last time in 1966.

Political historians have concluded that if Hawke had defeated Opperman, Hawke would not have become prime minister, a conclusion shared by Hawke himself who said his defeat by Opperman was "the best thing that happened to me."

Opperman became Australia's first High Commissioner to Malta in 1967, a job he held for five years.

== Personal life ==
Opperman married Mavys Craig in 1928 and they had a son and a daughter.

Opperman was a Freemason, initiated into Stonnington Lodge No 368 of the United Grand Lodge Victoria on 23 December 1925.

Sir Hubert and Lady (Mavys) Opperman resided at Edgewater Towers, St Kilda, Victoria, from the day it opened in 1961 until their move to a Wantirna retirement village in the late 1980s. "They left the 'glorious' views of their St Kilda home for the smog free air at the foot of the Dandenongs". The Edgewater Towers project was the brain child of Opperman's friend and sponsor Bruce Small. The Oppermans had two flats on the 6th floor facing the bay and he was often seen bicycling along the foreshore wearing his signature black beret.

== Death, honours and memorials ==
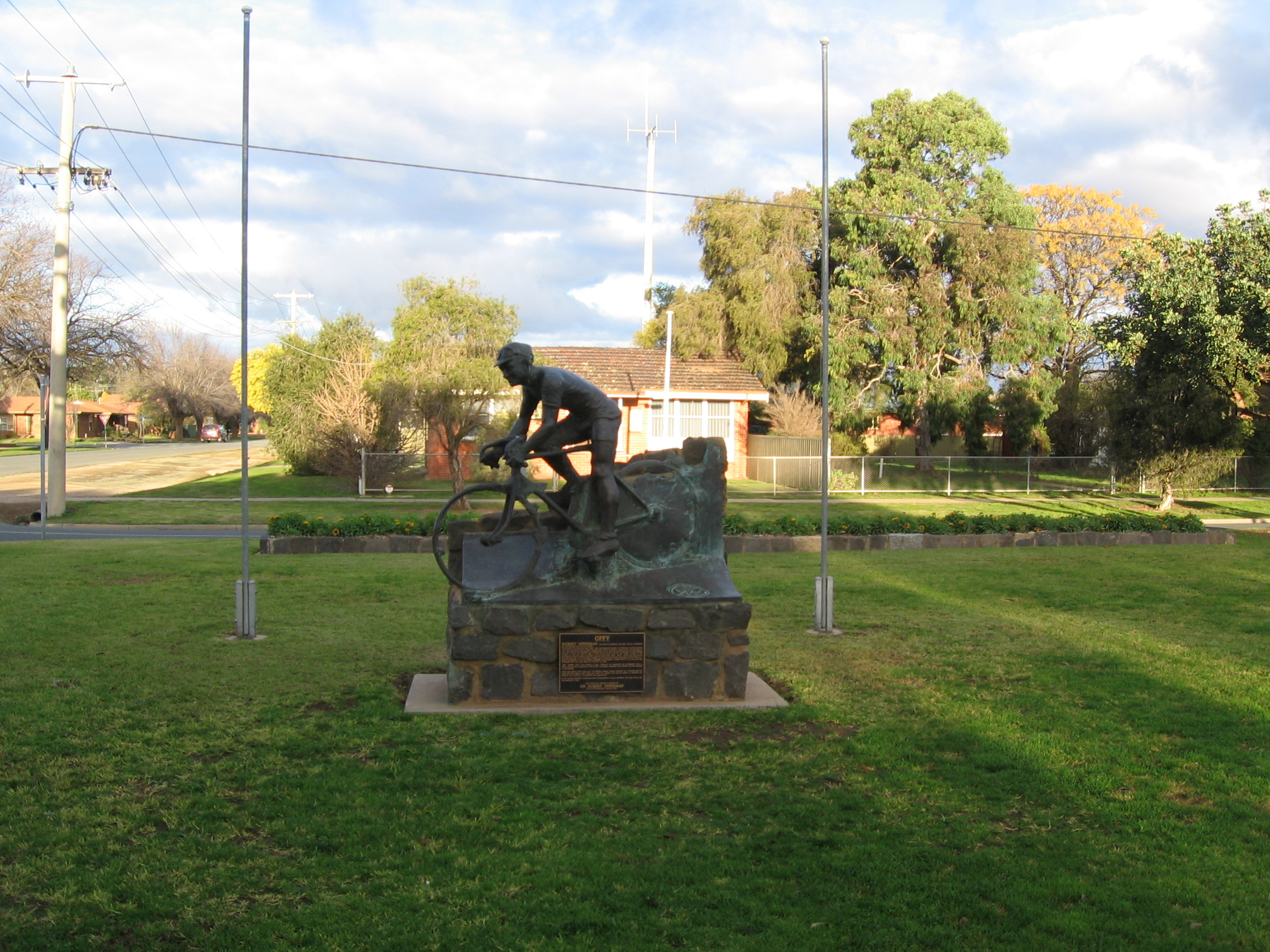
Hubert Opperman's statue in Rochester, Victoria

Opperman was appointed an Officer of the Order of the British Empire (OBE) in 1953, and made a Knight Bachelor in 1968 for his services as High Commissioner to Malta.

Opperman continued cycling until he was 90. He lived in a retirement village which, as the British journalist Alan Gayfer pointed out in 1993, had "No Cycling" signs. Opperman died on an exercise bicycle.

He was voted Europe's most popular sportsman of 1928 by 500,000 readers of the French sporting journal L'Auto, ahead of national tennis champion Henri Cochet. An obituary said he "ranked alongside Don Bradman and the race horse Phar Lap as an Australian sporting idol, but his fame at home proved less durable than theirs, perhaps because he went on to become a politician." He won the Frederick Thomas Bidlake Memorial Prize in 1934 as "the rider whose achievements are deemed the greatest of the year."

Opperman entered the Golden Book of Cycling on 13 October 1935. This recognised his record-breaking exploits in Australia, and more particularly his 1934 onslaught which took five British records in 14 days.

Opperman is commemorated every year with the Opperman All Day Trial, an Audax ride held in Australia in March in which teams of three or more ride a minimum of 360 km in 24 hours. Oppy's racing bicycle, used in his epic crossing from Fremantle to Sydney, was included in a travelling exhibit put on by the national museum. This bike was viewed in Exmouth, WA, in 1979. Citations of his incredible transcontinental speed were reported at 13 days +. Opperman was inducted into the Sport Australia Hall of Fame in 1985. The City of Knox, where Opperman spent his last years, dedicated and named several trails and cycle ways around the municipality after races which Opperman won. It has also dedicated an annual bicycle event, The Oppy Family Fun Ride. The ride is part of the Knox Festival each March.

A 'most ancient of berets' worn by Opperman in Europe between 1928 and 1931 is part of the National Museum of Australia's collection.

In 2015, he was an inaugural Cycling Australia Hall of Fame inductee.

== Teams ==
- 1924–1927: Malvern Star.
- 1928: Ravat-Malvern Star.
- 1929–1930: Malvern Star.
- 1931: Alleluia-Wolber, Elvish-Wolber.
- 1932–1935: Malvern Star.

== Notes ==
Political offices
Preceded by Shane Paltridge	Minister for Shipping and Transport; 1960–1963	Succeeded by Gordon Freeth
Preceded by Alick Downer	Australian Minister for Immigration; 1963–1966	Succeeded by Billy Snedden
Parliament of Australia
Preceded by John Dedman	Member for Corio; 1949–1967	Succeeded by Gordon Scholes
Diplomatic posts
Preceded by Douglas Sturkey (Acting)	Australian High Commissioner to Malta; 1967–1972	Succeeded by Bill Cutts
