= Peter McLaren (footballer) =

Australian rules footballer

Personal information
- Full name: Leslie Peter McLaren
- Born: 17 March 1923; Trafalgar, Victoria
- Died: 19 December 1996 (aged 73); Glen Alvie, Victoria
- Original team: Glen Alvie
- Height: 178 cm (5 ft 10 in)
- Weight: 78 kg (172 lb)

Playing career^{1}
Years	Club	Games (Goals)
1945	Collingwood	1 (0)
- ^{1} Playing statistics correct to the end of 1945.

Leslie Peter McLaren (17 March 1923 – 19 December 1996) was an Australian rules footballer who played with Collingwood in the Victorian Football League (VFL).

Prior to playing with Collingwood, McLaren served in the Royal Australian Navy during World War II.
