= Ernest Bainbridge =

Australian cyclist (1890–1984)

Personal information
- Full name: Ernest Bainbridge
- Born: 13 December 1890 Northcote, Victoria
- Died: 2 July 1984 (aged 93) Preston, Victoria
- Height: 5 ft 6 in (1.68 m)
- Weight: 139 lb (63 kg)

Cycling career
- Sport: Cycling
- Role: Rider

Ernest "Ernie" Bainbridge (1890–1984), also known as Ern Bainbridge, was an Australian racing cyclist, who is best known for competing in the 1928 Tour de France with fellow Australian Percy Osborn and Hubert Opperman and New Zealander Harry Watson.

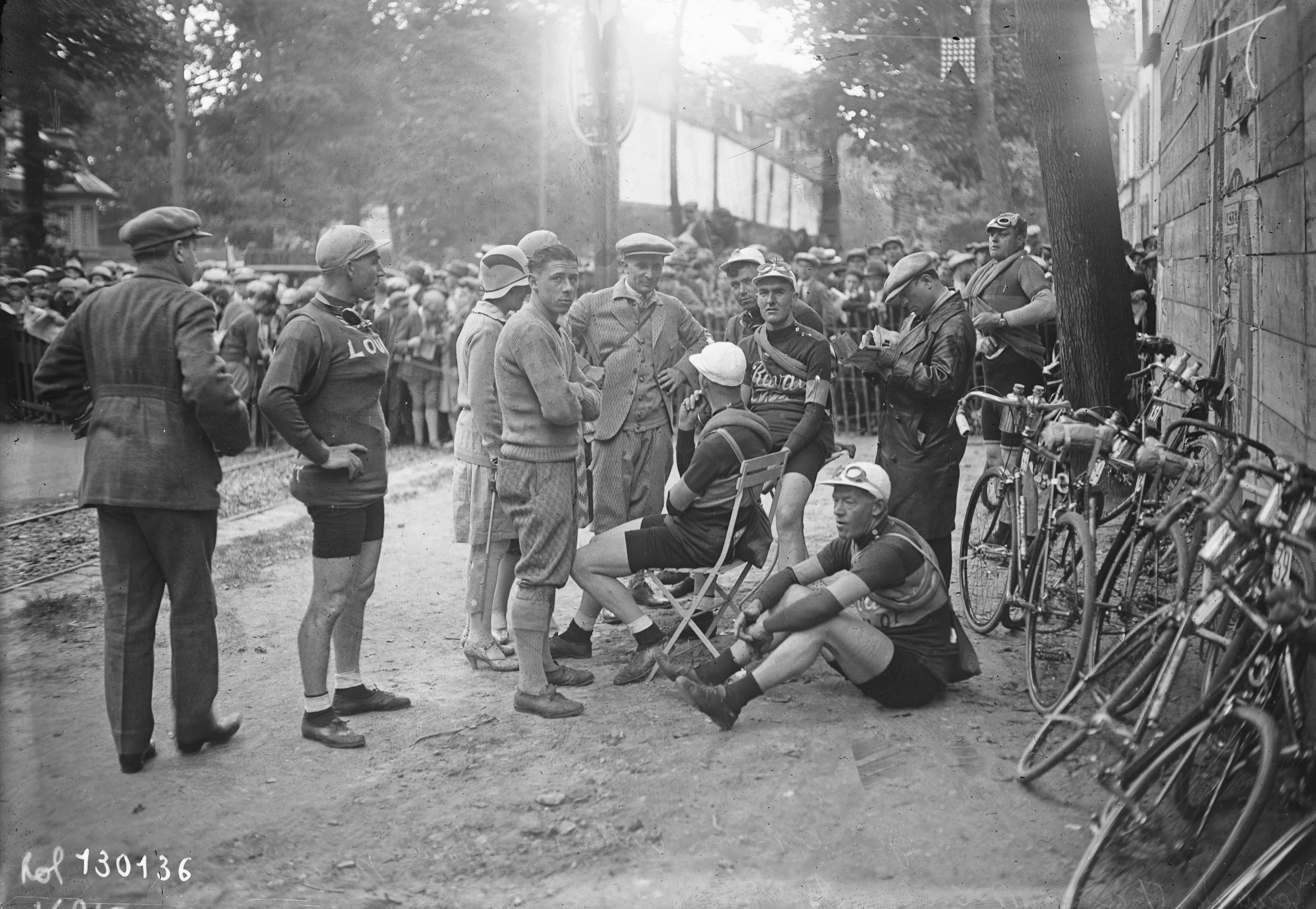
1928 - Tour de France, Etape 1 Départ: Ernest Brainbridge, Hubert Opperman, Percy Osborne, Harry Watson & Edouard Meunier

== Early career ==
Bainbridge did not meet with success in his early career. In 1911, he competed in the Warrnambool to Melbourne off a handicap of 30 min, finishing 65th in a time of 9h 11' 10". In 1914 he rode in the Cycle Traders 100 over 100 miles (160 km) finishing 87th off a handicap of 18 min.

In February 1914, Bainbridge won the two mile Shepparton Wheelrace off 800 yards.

== War service ==
In 1916 Bainbridge, then aged 25, enlisted as a private in the Australian Imperial Force. In April 1917 he was wounded in action in France, suffering a gunshot wound to the left arm and was discharged from the AIF in 1919.

== Later cycling career ==
Bainbridge returned to cycling in 1920, finishing 18th in the Goulburn to Sydney Classic. The prestigious road race of the era was the Warrnambool to Melbourne, where the fastest time carried the title of Long Distance Road Champion of Australasia. Bainbridge set the third fastest time in 1923 and the second fastest time in 1924. Bainbridge finished well back in the field in 1925 and 1926.

The Warrnambool was not held in 1927 as it was replaced by the Dunlop Grand Prix, which at the time was the biggest cycling race in the British Empire and the richest race in the world. The race was held in four stages from the 14–19 November 1927, covering 690 miles (1110 km). Opperman dominated the race, winning all four stages. Bainbridge finished 4th in stages 1 and 3 and 2nd in stage 4, finished third overall, behind Opperman and Watson. The Dunlop Grand Prix carried the title of Long Distance Road Champion of Australasia.

One consequence of the Dunlop Grand Prix was the public subscription, organised by the Sporting Globe to send Opperman and an Australian team to the Tour de France. Writing after the Dunlop Grand Prix, Opperman paid tribute to 3 riders, Watson, Bainbridge and Osborn and these were the riders selected to travel with him to France. Bainbridge was captain of the Preston Cycling Club.

== 1928 Tour de France ==
In 1928, aged 37, Bainbridge set sail for the Tour de France. The shortest day was 119 km and the longest 387 km. There were plans to bolster the 4 Australasians with European riders however these did not come to fruition, with the result that the 4 Australasian riders were up against teams of up to 10 riders. Their position was worsened by Henri Desgrange's plan to run most of the race as a team time trial, as he had the previous year. Teams started at intervals and shared the pace until the end. Desgrange wanted to stop riders racing casually for all but the last hour. The American historian Bill McGann wrote:

Desgrange... wanted the Tour de France to be a contest where unrelenting individual effort in the cauldron of intense competition resulted in the supreme test of both the body and will of the athlete. Desgrange was convinced that the teams were combining to fix the outcome of the race. At the very best, even if they were honest, they helped a weaker rider do well. He also felt that on the flat stages the riders did not push themselves, saving their energy for the mountains.

With four rather than 10 riders to share the pace, Opperman and his team were handicapped. The Franco-American writer René de Latour wrote:

Even if I live to be 150 years old, there is one picture I am sure I shall never forget. It is the sight of the poor lonely Opperman being caught day after day by the various teams of 10 super-athletes, swapping their pace beautifully. The four Australians [sic] would start together. Bainbridge would do his best to hang on, but even though he may have been a good rider in the past, the passing years had taken most of his speed, and he would generally go off the back after 50 miles or so... That left three Aussies against the trade teams' 10. Then, inevitably, if it was not Osborn it was Watson who would have to quit at the 100 miles mark.

Opperman said of the long stages and the hours of darkness that riders endured:

As the bicycle banged and jolted over uneven ground, one yearned for company, for another human whose conversation would share the anxious misery of those uncertain hours. Yes, there it was, a vague outline of a hunched figure swinging and swaying in an effort to find a smooth track. French is the Esperanto of the cycling fraternity, so I ventured some words in that tongue. C'est dur ("It is hard"), but only a grunt came back. For a mile we plugged in silence, then again in French, I tried: 'This Tour – it is very difficult – all are weary.' Once more only a snarling noise returned. 'The boorish oaf,' I thought, 'I'll make the blighter answer.'

'It is very dark, and you are too tired to talk,' I inferred, sarcastically. The tone touched a verbal gusher as a totally unexpected voice bawled, 'Shut up, you Froggie gasbag – I can't understand a flaming word you've been jabbering,' and then I realised that I had been unwittingly riding with Bainbridge.

Bainbridge had his highest finish in stage 8 where he finished 20th. He was forced to withdraw in the fifteenth stage in the French Alps due to saddle sores and infected wounds from crashes.
