= Vasily Mykhlik =

Soviet Ilyushin Il-2 pilot and squadron commander (1922–1996)

Vasily Ilyich Mykhlik
- Василий Ильич Мыхлик
- Born: 29 December 1922; Soldatskoye village, Odesa Governorate, Ukrainian SSR
- Died: 29 December 1996 (aged 74); Moscow, Russian Federation
- Military career
- Allegiance: Soviet Union
- Branch: Soviet Air Force
- Service years: 1940 – 1960
- Rank: Colonel
- Unit: 566th Assault Aviation Regiment
- Conflicts: World War II
- Awards: Hero of the Soviet Union (twice)

Vasily Ilyich Mykhlik (Russian: Василий Ильич Мыхлик; 29 December 1922 – 29 December 1996) was an Ilyushin Il-2 pilot and squadron commander in the 566th Assault Aviation Regiment of the Soviet Air Forces during the Second World War who was twice awarded the title Hero of the Soviet Union. After the war he rose to the rank of colonel and later became an engineer.

== Early life ==
Mykhlik was born on 29 December 1922 in Soldatskoye village (today Andriivka), Odesa Governorate, Ukrainian SSR to a Ukrainian peasant family. In 1925 his family moved to the city of Krivoy Rog, where he completed his tenth grade of school in 1940 before entering the military in November. After graduating from the Volsk Military School of Aircraft Mechanics in September 1941 he worked as an aircraft mechanic for the 8th Reserve Fighter Aviation Regiment until starting pilot training in March. From then until December 1942 he trained under the 2nd Separate Training Aviation Regiment, and from December 1942 to April 1943 he underwent further training at the 224th Assault Aviation Division Retraining Center.

== World War II ==
Having arrived at warfront in April 1943 as a pilot in the 566th Assault Aviation Regiment with the rank of senior sergeant, he did not fly his first combat mission until 12 July. However, once he experienced his baptism by fire he quickly began to accumulate more sorties, totaling five missions in one day on 26 July. Despite being shot down and having to make an emergency landing on 31 January 1944, he and his gunner managed to safely return to their unit just a few days a later. On 6 August 1944 he was nominated for the title Hero of the Soviet Union for having totaled 105 sorties on the Il-2. Mykhlik continued to quickly rise through the ranks of his unit, gaining promotion to squadron commander in November 1944. That year he was admitted to the Communist Party. While the squadron was under his command its crews totaled 309 sorties but lost only one of their own aircraft. In addition to flying combat sorties as squadron commander he took on the responsibility of flight training, training six new pilots in 1945. On 27 March 1945 he was nominated for a second gold star, which he received in June. By the end of the war he was credited with 188 combat sorties, taking out 35 tanks, two ammunition depots, 8 anti-aircraft artillery batteries, five steam locomotives, 19 rail cars, 114 trucks, and shot down one FW 190. Throughout the war he fought on the Western, Bryansk, Leningrad and 3rd Belorussian fronts, participating in the battles of Kursk, Orel, Krasnoye selso-Ropsha, Leningrad, Novgorod, Vyborg, Narva, Tallinn, East Prussia, Koenigsberg, and Zemland.

== Later life ==
Mykhlik continued to serve as the senior navigator of his wartime regiment until he transferred to the 118th Guards Assault Aviation Regiment in June 1946, but he left in November to attend the Air Force Academy, which he graduated from in 1951. He then held the post of pilot-inspector for flight technique in the 5th Guards Assault Aviation Division until December 1952. He then briefly worked as a flight inspector for the combat training department for the air force of the Moscow Military District before becoming the deputy commander of a research aviation regiment in April 1953; however, he left in July for the position of senior flight inspector at the 4th Air Force Combat Use Center, where he remained until 1958. From 1958 to 1960 he was the senior flight inspector of the Aviation Training Directorate of the Central Committee of DOSAAF, and from then until leaving the military in 1966 he was the duty officer of the flight control command post of General Staff. Throughout his career he flew the Il-2, Il-10, Il-28, MiG-17, Yak-11, Yak-12, and Yak-18. After retiring from the military with the rank of colonel in October 1966 he worked as an engineer for a construction trust, being promoted to senior engineer in 1967 and eventually becoming head of the consolidated personnel recruiting department of field construction for the northern regions in 1976. He died on 29 December 1996 in Moscow and was buried in the Troekurovsky cemetery.

== Awards and honors ==
- Twice Hero of the Soviet Union (23 February 1945 and 29 June 1945)
- Order of Lenin (23 February 1945)
- Three Order of the Red Banner (7 September 1943, 21 June 1944, and 22 February 1945)
- Order of Alexander Nevsky (5 November 1944)
- Two Order of the Patriotic War 1st class (25 July 1944 and 11 March 1985)
- Order of the Red Star (31 July 1943)
- campaign and jubilee medals
