= Ron Hibbert =

Australian rules footballer (1924–1996)

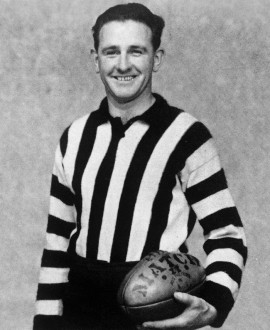
- Hibbert in 1944

Personal information
- Full name: Ron Hibbert
- Born: 24 March 1924
- Died: 8 December 1996 (aged 72)
- Original team: Coburg Eureka
- Height: 178 cm (5 ft 10 in)
- Weight: 71.5 kg (158 lb)

Playing career^{1}
Years	Club	Games (Goals)
1944	Collingwood	5 (2)
- ^{1} Playing statistics correct to the end of 1944.

Ron Hibbert (24 March 1924 – 8 December 1996) was an Australian rules footballer who played with Collingwood in the Victorian Football League (VFL).
