= Percy Osborn =

Australian cyclist (1901–1991)

Personal information
- Full name: Percy Osborn
- Born: 19 December 1901 Koo Wee Rup, Victoria
- Died: 21 December 1991 (aged 91) Koo Wee Rup, Victoria

Cycling career
- Sport: Cycling
- Role: Rider

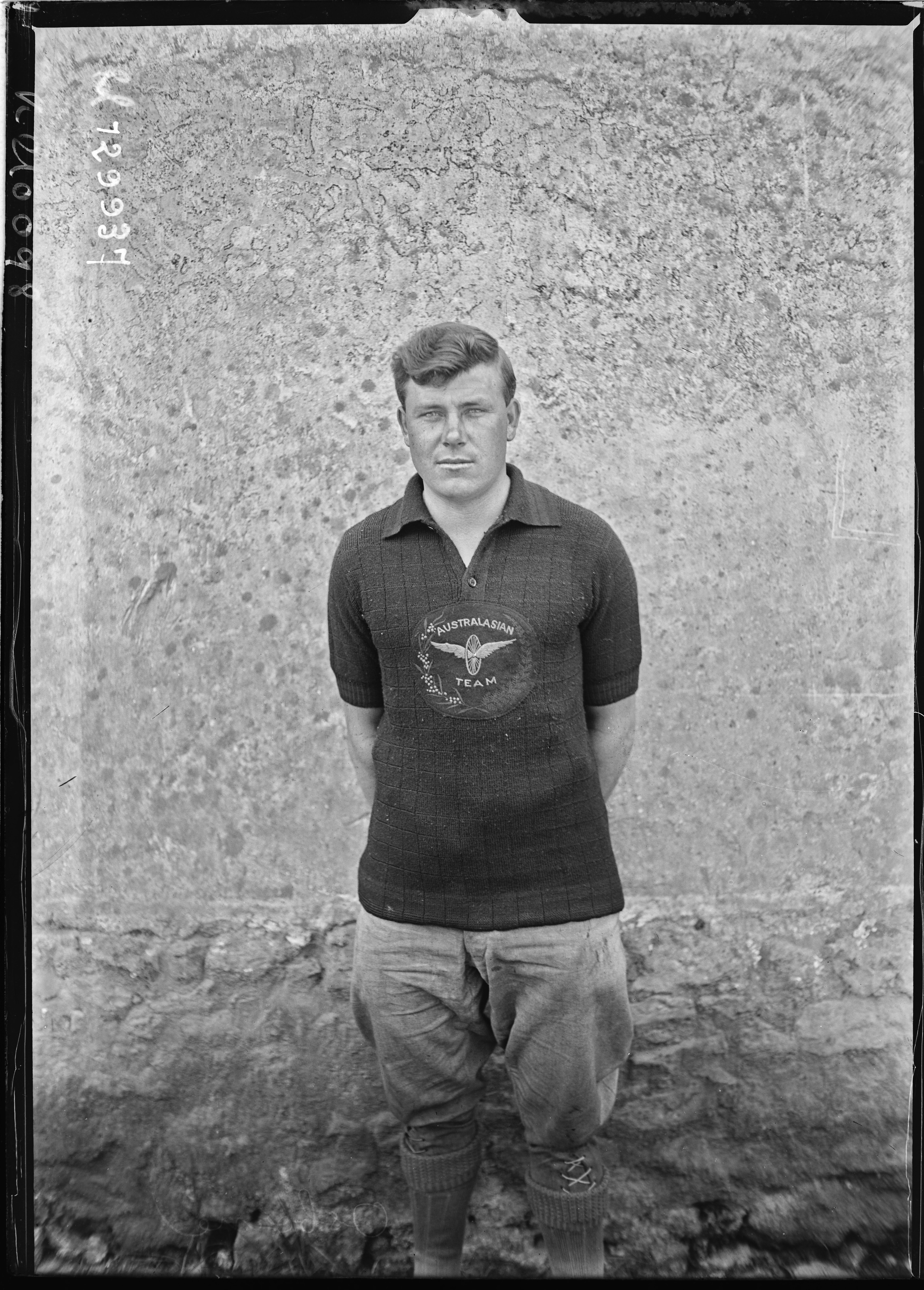

Percy Osborn (1901-1991) was an Australian racing cyclist.

Osborn from Koo Wee Rup, Victoria competed in the 1928 Tour de France with fellow Australians Hubert Opperman and Ernest Bainbridge and New Zealander Harry Watson where he finished 38th. He was 22 hours 1 minute and 49 seconds behind the winner Nicolas Frantz. The Australians cycling tour of Europe was financed by a fund raising campaign run by The Sporting Globe.

In 1927 Osborn was the fastest professional in the Goulburn to Sydney Classic with a time of 5hrs 54mins, the first time the race has been completed in less than 6 hours. The feature race of 1927 was the Dunlop Grand Prix, which at the time was the biggest cycling race in the British Empire and the richest race in the world. The race was held in four stages from the 14–19 November 1927, covering 690 miles (1110 km). Osborn finished sixth behind Opperman, Watson and Bainbridge.

Osborn lived and worked in Koo Wee Rup for the rest of his life, and died while a resident at Koo Wee Rup’s Killara hostel.
