= Tubular tyre =

Bicycle tyre

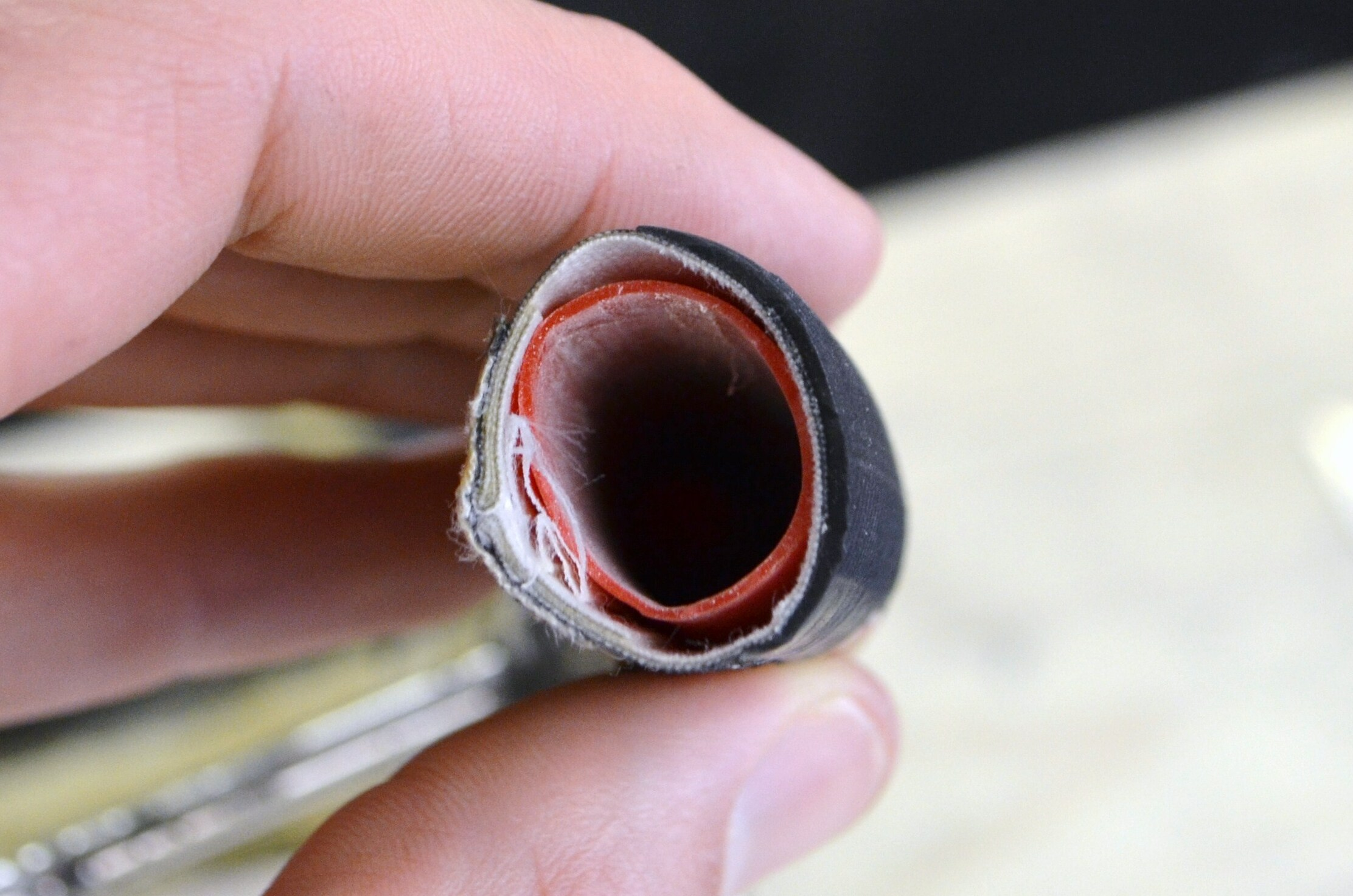
Cross section of a tubular tyre: The inner tube (red) is completely enclosed by textile casing (white). A layer of rubber (black) provides grip while riding. The inner tube is covered with white talc powder to prevent it from sticking to itself.

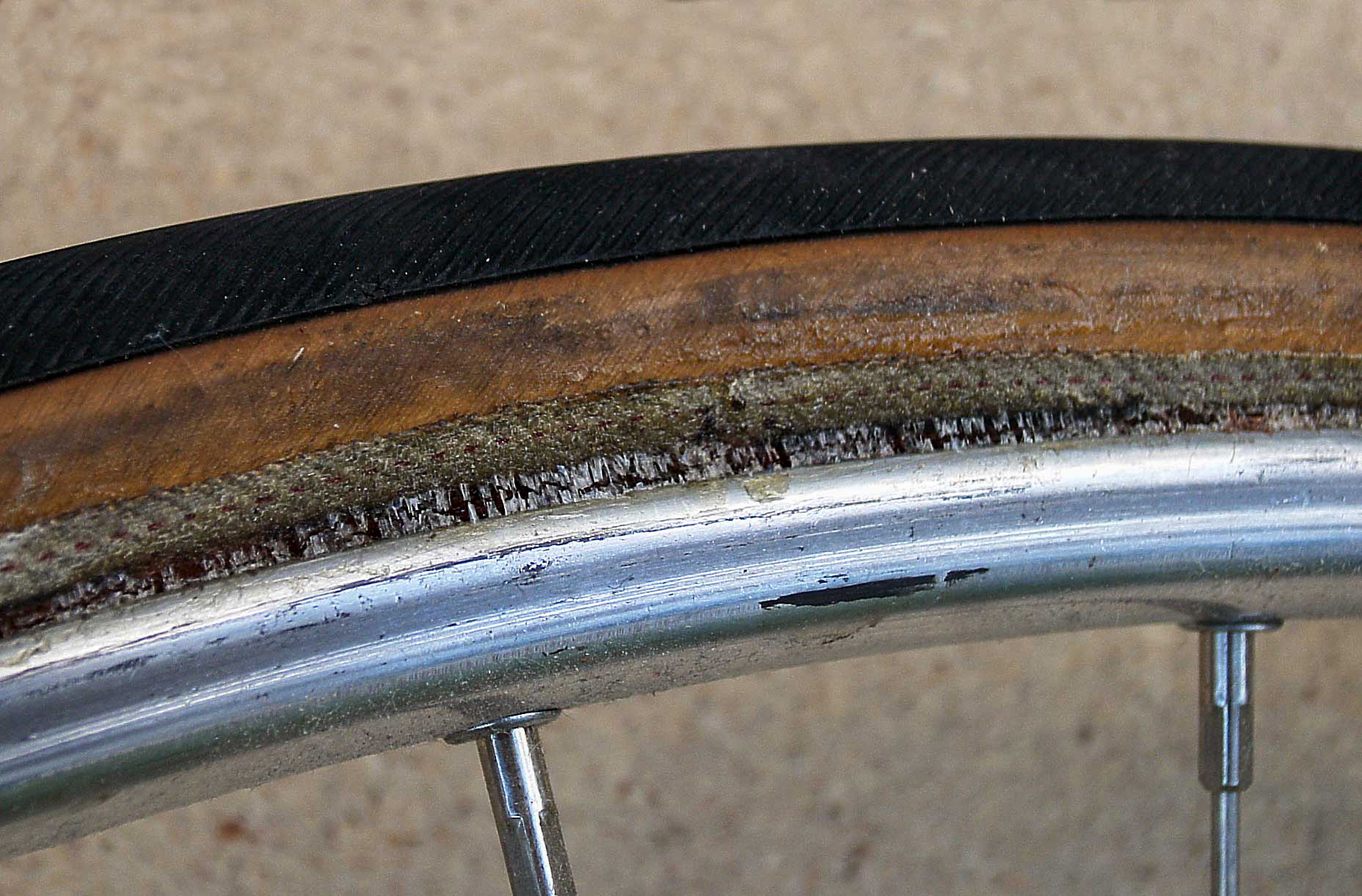
Tubular tire rolled from rim to show glue between them

A tubular tyre, referred to as a tub in Britain, a sew-up in the US, a single in Australia, or just a tubular is a bicycle tyre that is stitched closed around the inner tube to form a torus. The combination is then glued (sometimes with two-sided tape) onto a specially designed rim, referred to as a "sprint rim" in Britain, and just a "tubular rim" in the US, of a bicycle wheel.

The combination of a tubular tyre and its tubular rim is lighter than that of a clincher tyre and clincher rim, and will therefore always result in less rotating mass or a stronger construction. Tubulars can also be used over a wider range of tyre pressures from 1.7 to 14 bar (25 to 200 psi), compared to the typical 3-6 bar on a clincher tyre.

== History ==
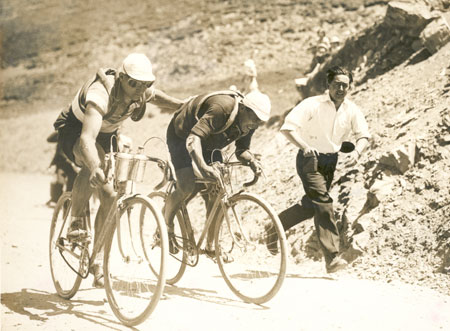
André Leducq and Georges Speicher in the 1933 Tour de France carrying spare tubular tyres on their shoulders

For amateur road cycle racing, clincher tyres largely replaced tubular tyres in the early 2000s, but saw a resurgence when carbon rims increased in popularity, as the carbon rim better suited the tubular design.

In the 2010s, tubular tyres were still commonly used for indoor track racing (where the closed track makes punctures from road debris less commonplace), professional road racing, road time trials, and cyclo-cross racing.

In 2009, a tubeless tubular with an integrated airtight liner instead of a separate inner tube was introduced.

== Weight considerations ==
The tubular tyre and rim combination has the potential to either be slightly lighter or stronger than more common clincher tyres. While the clincher tyres and rims technology has caught up in recent years, the total weight of a tubular rim and tyre is still always lighter than its clincher equivalent.

Outside racing, the total lightness advantage is somewhat offset by the need to carry at least one entire spare tubular tyre (only a patch kit or inner tube are needed for clincher tyres).

Yet the extra weight—and more importantly, rotational inertia—is off the wheel, and a tubular tyre therefore has the potential to accelerate more easily. Advances in tyre sealant have made carrying an extra tyre a bit outdated.

== Safety ==
=== Puncture safety ===
An advantage of tubular tyres is that it is a "closed system" where the inner tube is enclosed within the outer tyre casing, meaning in the event of a flat that the air typically escapes far less quickly than with a clincher. For this reason tubulars are generally regarded as safer to ride than clinchers on fast mountain descents.

=== Controllability in the event of a puncture ===
A properly glued tubular tyre may be regarded as safer in the event of a puncture at high speeds because it is not as susceptible to roll off the rim, tubular and tubeless tyres in which punctured tyre more easily can roll off the rim and lead to loss of bike control, and a crash.

=== Heating from rim brakes ===
Tubular tyres can be less safe with rim brakes on long descents because the heat generated by braking can cause the glue holding the tyre to the rim to fail.

Additionally, excessive heat from rim brakes can cause the tyre pressure to increase so much that the tyre can explode, but this problem also applies for clincher tyres used with rim brakes.

== Tyre change ==
When a tubular tyre is worn out, it is easiest and most common to replace the entire tyre. If it punctures and is to be repaired, it requires more labour to repair than a clincher tyres (wired–on in Britain), as the tyre must be removed from the rim, opened up, patched, sewn back up, then finally glued back to the rim.

In emergency situations, for example in the event of a flat tyre on a bike ride, one can get home by cycling on a new tubular tyre that has not been glued, or with a previously used one with glue that has not dried completely, but care must be taken to ride gently until home as the tyre will not be fully affixed to the rim.

Tubular tyres may have less chance of a puncture when changing tyres compared to clincher tyres where the tube can easily get pinched and punctured.

Tubular tyres are typically fitted with Presta valves.

== Gallery ==
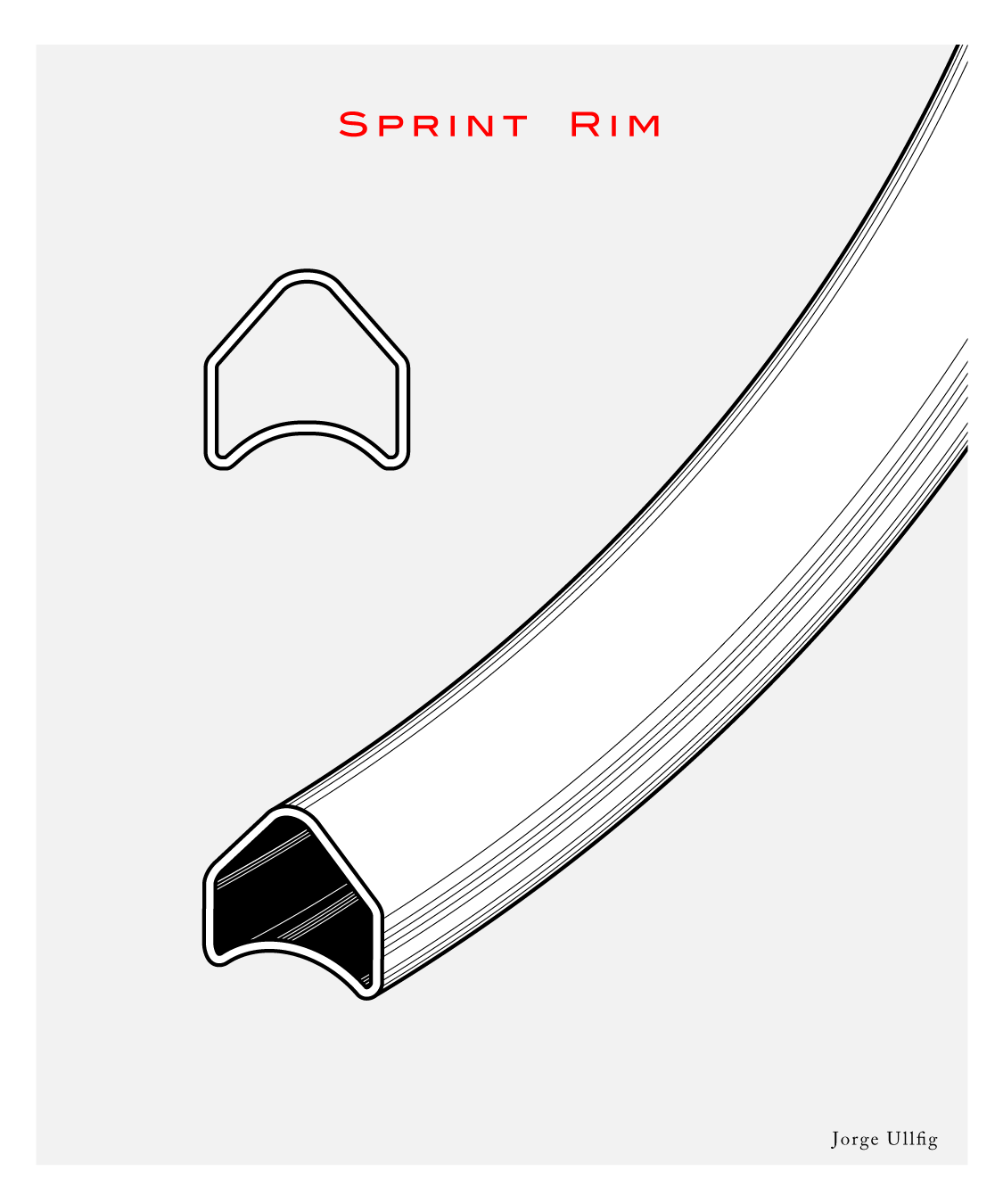
Rims for tubular tyres, referred to as "sprint rims" in Britain

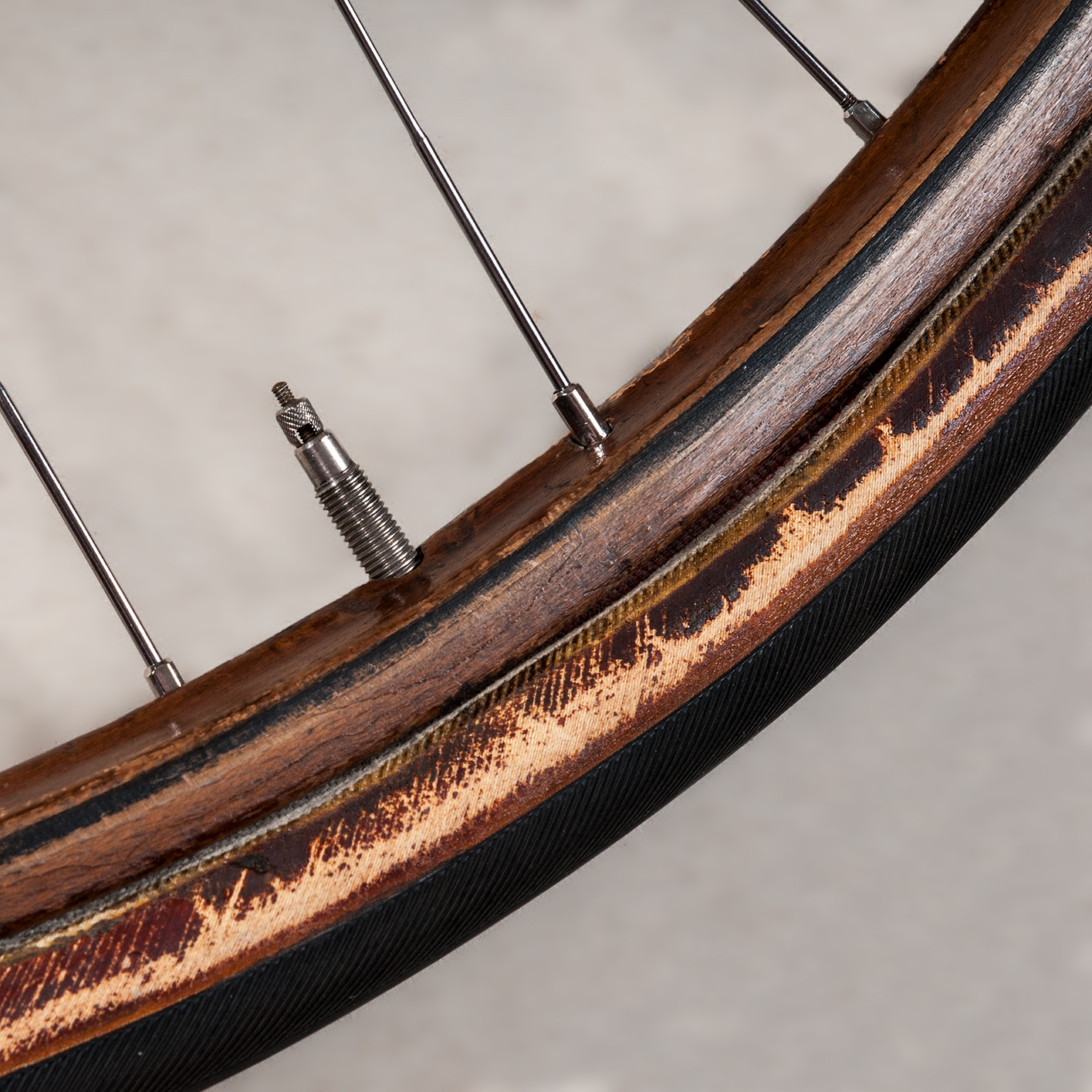
Wooden bicycle rim with tubular tyre and a Presta valve

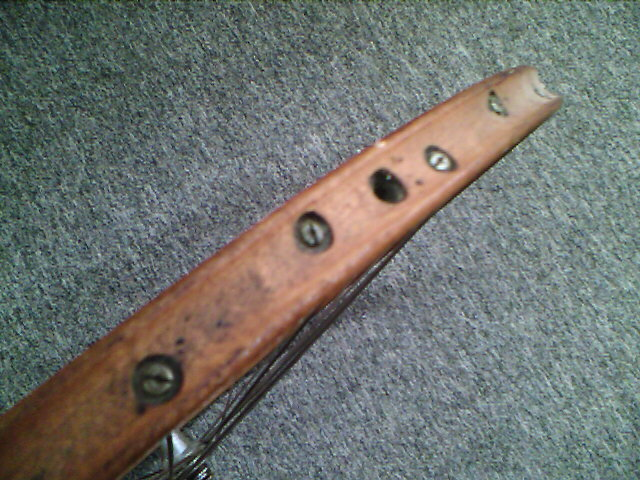
Detail of wooden rim for tubular tires

== See also ==
- Tubeless tire
