= Harry Watson (cyclist) =

New Zealand cyclist

Henry George Watson (13 June 1904 – 25 December 1996) was the first New Zealander to ride in the Tour de France. In 1928, he teamed up with Australian cyclists, Hubert Opperman, Percy Osborn and Ernie Bainbridge. They were the first English-speaking team to ride the Tour de France.

== Early life and family ==
Watson was born in 1904. His parents were George and Elsie Watson, who farmed on the Canterbury Plains. He was the oldest of four children; the next oldest was his brother Arthur, and the two youngest were sisters Gladys and Joy. The family shifted to Marshland on the northern outskirts of Christchurch to become market gardeners. There, they were neighbours with the Arnst family, who were equally sports-mad as all the Watson children. Jack Arnst (born 1883) was a champion cyclist, and his twin Richard "Dick" Arnst was a world champion rower. On 7 September 1926, Harry Watson married his neighbour Catherine Margaret "Kitty" Arnst (born 1905) at St Matthew's Church in St Albans. Her father, Charles William Arnst (born 1880), was an elder brother to Jack and Dick.

== Cycling career and Tour de France participation ==
Watson was noticed by the global cycling world after a strong performance in the 1927 Dunlop Grand Prix, which at the time was the biggest cycling race in the British Empire, and the richest race in the world. The Dunlop was held in four stages around Victoria, Australia, in November 1927, covering 1,111.3 kilometres (690.5 mi). The Grand Prix carried with it the title of Long Distance Road Champion of Australasia, and Watson would finish in second behind his future Tour teammate, Hubert Opperman. This result would lead to his selection for the 1928 Tour de France.

In 1928 Watson would start the Tour on an Australasian team of four riders, making him the first New Zealander to take part in the Tour de France. The 1928 Tour was 5,377 kilometres (3,341 mi) long, most of it on unsealed roads, and the riders used heavy, fixed wheel bicycles. There were 22 stages, ranging from 119 kilometres to 387 kilometres. The Australasians were relatively inexperienced (they had never raced in Europe before) and were a trade team of four competing against teams of eight to ten cyclists. French media predicted they would only last a few stages before pulling out. Of the 168 riders starting that year, only 41 finished. Watson successfully finished the race, placing 28th. He stated afterwards that it was the toughest race he had ever completed: "When I think of the mountain climbing, the mad rushes downhill, and the riding at night in pitch darkness, well, it is a veritable nightmare! In spite of this, it was a wonderful experience racing the Continentals."

After eight months abroad Watson returned to New Zealand and continued cycling competitively. Over the remainder of his career, he won almost every long distance race that he entered, and set some enduring records in the process. He would return to Australia in 1934 for the Centenary 1000, a one-week race over seven stages covering 1,102 miles (1,773 km) to mark the Centenary of Victoria, a race which would see him compete again for the title of Long Distance Road Champion of Australasia. In this race, Watson was one of the 30 "A Grade" riders starting from scratch, and finished 2nd in stage 2 from Warrnambool to Stawell over 152.25 miles (245.02 km), and took second overall. Another of his most notable performances came in 1935 when he completed the 167-kilometre Taranaki Around-the-Mountain Road Race in 4 hours, 8 minutes, 38 seconds (average speed of 40 km/h). He would ultimately retire from the sport in 1937 at the age of 33.

== Le Ride ==
In July 2013, The Amazing Race host Phil Keoghan paid homage to Watson and the other riders of the 1928 Tour de France by retracing the ride route on bikes of the era. His journey was filmed for a documentary, Le Ride, and also served as a fund-raiser for multiple sclerosis research.
