= Miguel Ortega (pentathlete) =

Mexican modern pentathlete (1908–1996)

Personal information
- Born: 1908 Mexico City, Mexico
- Died: 3 December 1996 (aged 87–88) Mexico City, Mexico

Sport
- Sport: Modern pentathlon

Miguel Ortega (1908 – 3 December 1996) was a Mexican modern pentathlete. He competed at the 1932 Summer Olympics.
