= The Sporting Globe =

Australian newspaper

- Type: Semi-weekly newspaper (1922–1979); Weekly newspaper (1979–1996)
- Format: Tabloid
- Owner: The Herald and Weekly Times
- Founded: 22 July 1922
- Ceased publication: 2 September 1996
- Language: English
- City: Melbourne
- Country: Australia
- ISSN: 1030-0317

The Sporting Globe was a newspaper published in Melbourne from 1922 until 1996.

== Establishment ==
The first issue of the paper was published on 22 July 1922 and, for the first four weeks, it was published only on Saturday evenings. On 16 August 1922, a Wednesday afternoon edition was also introduced. Printed on pink paper, the paper was published by Walter R. May for The Herald and Weekly Times at the corner of Flinders and Russell streets, Melbourne.

Initially the Saturday edition was priced at 2d, and the larger Wednesday edition at 3d. With the introduction of the Wednesday edition, the paper also widened its coverage beyond purely sport, acquiring the subtitle "A Journal of Sport, the Stage and the Screen". However, during 1924, it dropped the subtitle and returned to covering purely sport.

== Place in popular culture ==
The Saturday edition of the newspaper played an important part in Melbourne's football culture, particularly before the introduction of television to Australia in 1956: the newspaper was released one to two hours after the completion of the afternoon's Victorian Football League games, and contained results and match reports.

== Demise ==
Former writers at the newspaper noted that the expansion of television coverage of football reduced the Sporting Globe's utility and readership, along with the preference for cars over public transport; ultimately the Saturday evening edition was discontinued in 1979, with the final Wednesday edition being published on 2 September 1996.
