= HHK =

HHK can mean:

- Happy Hacking Keyboard
- Henry H. Kennedy, Jr. (born 1948), United States District Judge
- Ho-Ho-Kus, New Jersey, United States
- Marching and Cycling Band HHK, a Dutch music association
- Republican Party of Armenia (Armenian: Հայաստանի Հանրապետական Կուսակցություն, ՀՀԿ, Hayastani Hanrapetakan Kusaktsutyun)
- Restored Reformed Church (Dutch: Hersteld Hervormde Kerk), a Christian denomination in the Netherlands
- Hybrid Histidine Kinase, a protein in fungal cells
