= Cycling =

Activity of riding a bicycle

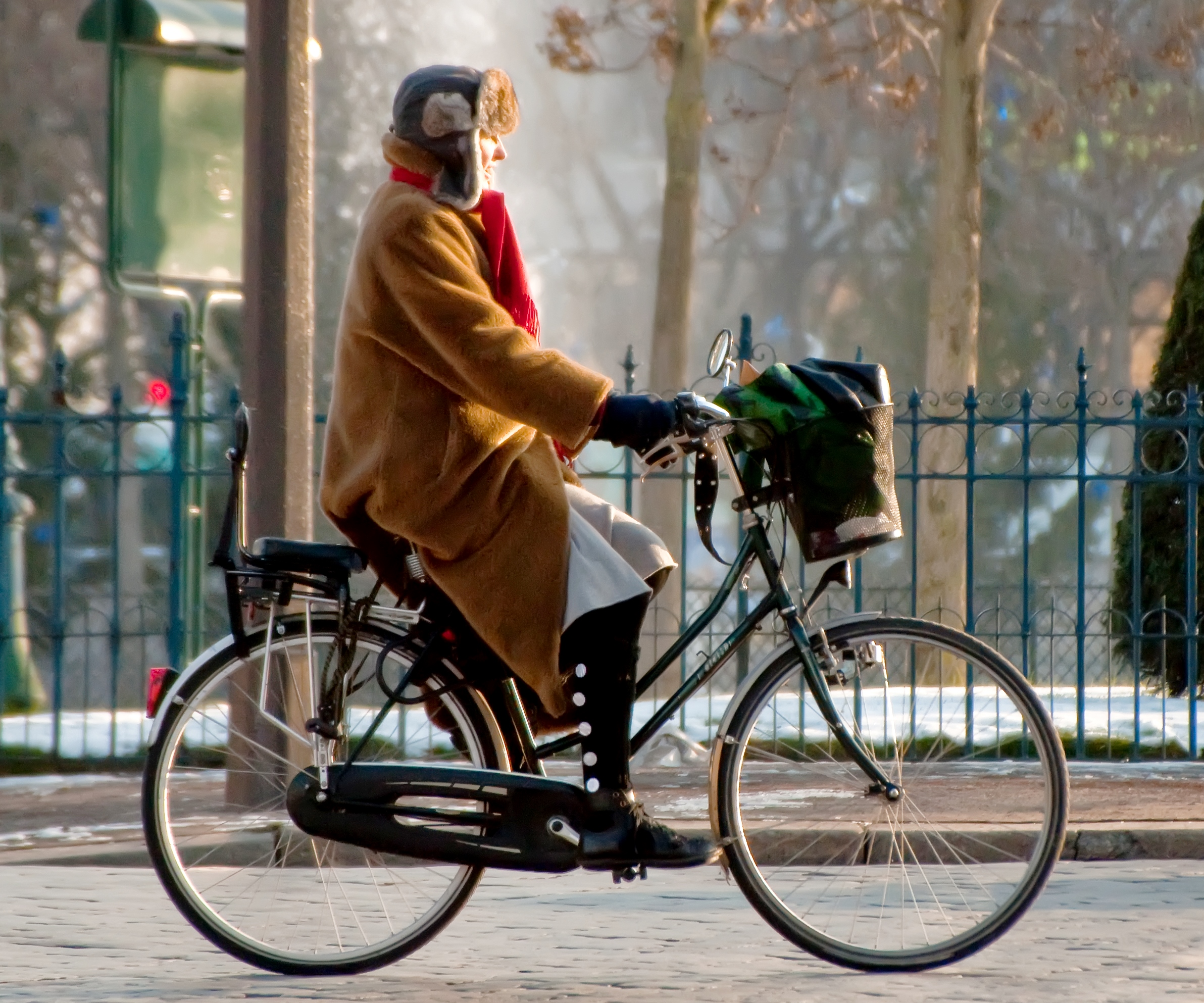
European city bike

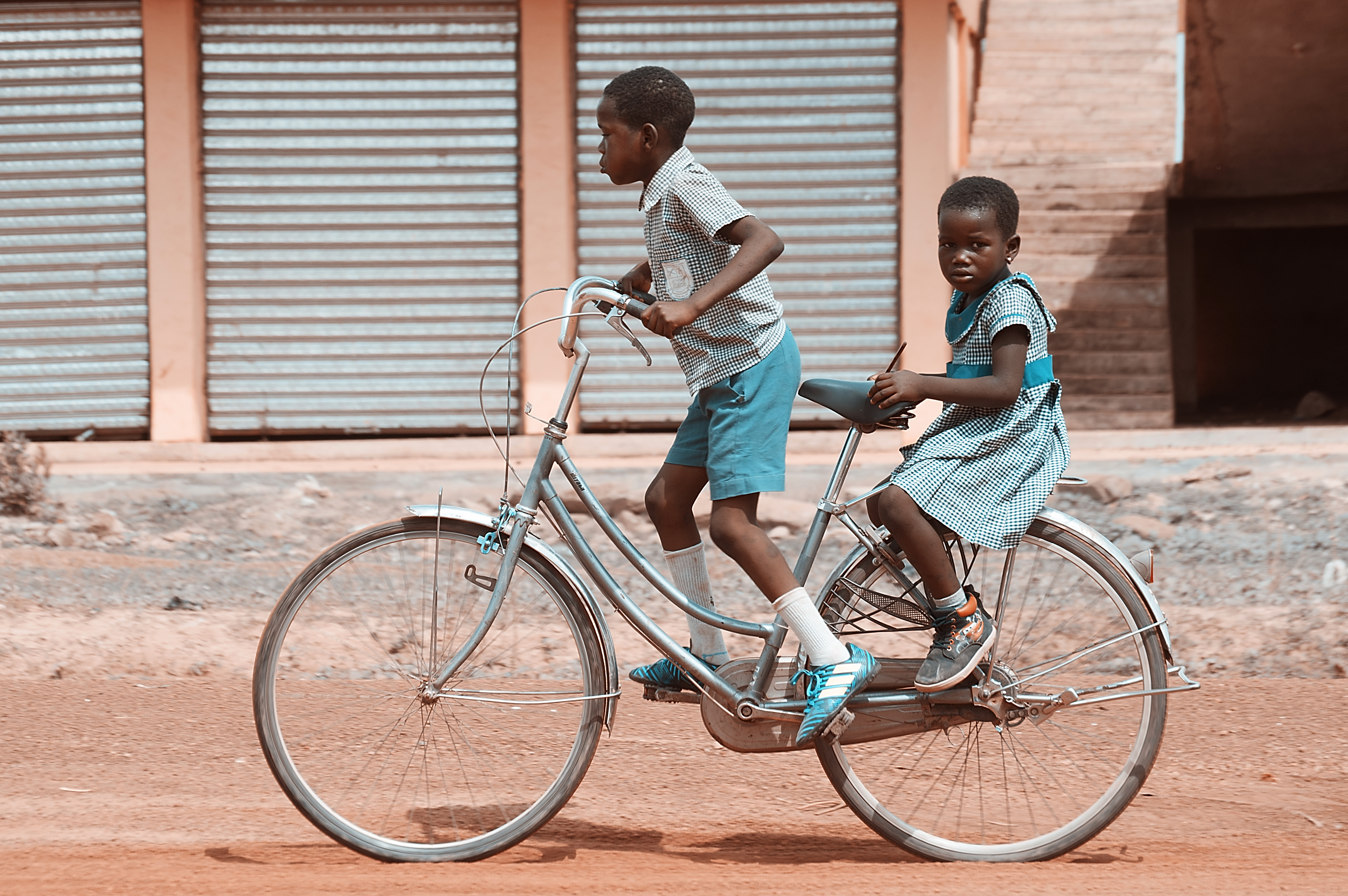
Children riding a bike in Ghana

Cycling, also known as bicycling or biking, is the activity of riding a bicycle or other types of pedal-driven human-powered vehicles such as balance bikes, unicycles, tricycles, and quadricycles. Cycling is practised around the world for purposes including transport, recreation, exercise, and competitive sport.

== History ==
Cycling became popularized in Europe and North America in the latter part and especially the last decade of the 19th century. Today, over 50 percent of the human population knows how to ride a bike.

=== War ===
The bicycle has been used as a method of reconnaissance as well as transporting soldiers and supplies to combat zones. In this it has taken over many of the functions of horses in warfare. In the Second Boer War, both sides used bicycles for scouting. In World War I, France, Germany, Australia and New Zealand used bicycles to move troops. In its 1937 invasion of China, Japan employed some 50,000 bicycle troops, and similar forces were instrumental in Japan's march or "roll" through Malaya in World War II. Germany used bicycles again in World War II, while the British employed airborne "Cycle-commandos" with folding bikes.

In the Vietnam War, communist forces used bicycles extensively as cargo carriers along the Ho Chi Minh Trail.

The last country known to maintain a regiment of bicycle troops was Switzerland, which disbanded its last unit in 2003.

== Equipment ==
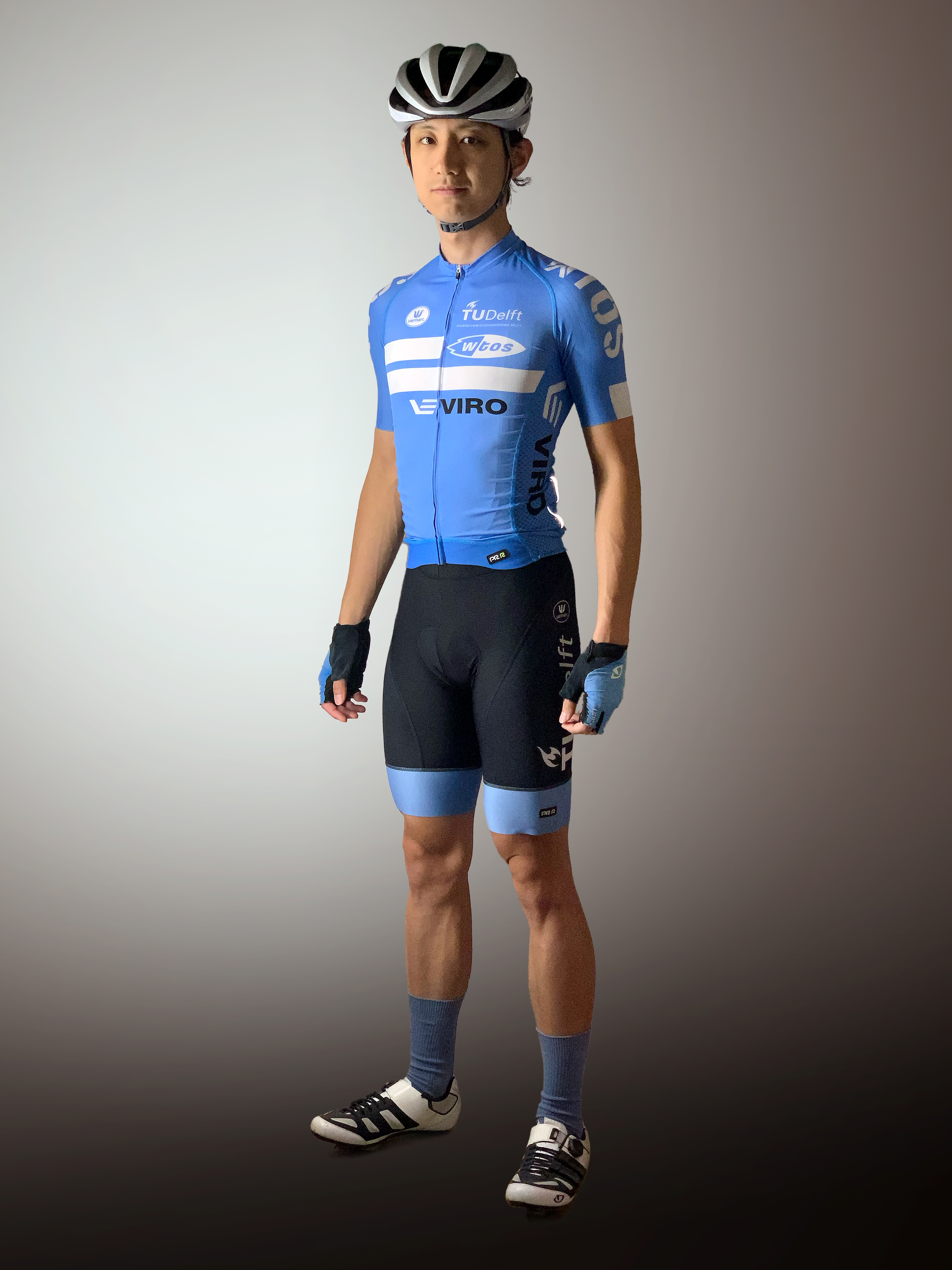
Road cyclists often wear tight-fitting clothing to improve performance and comfort for competitions. Here, a cyclist wears a summer team cycling kit made with Lycra material and a helmet.

Video of a recreational cycling ride in Alabama

In many countries, the most commonly used vehicle for road transport is a utility bicycle. These have frames with relaxed geometry, protecting the rider from shocks of the road and easing steering at low speeds. Utility bicycles tend to be equipped with accessories such as mudguards, pannier racks and lights, which extend their usefulness on a daily basis. Since the bicycle is so effective as a means of transportation, various companies have developed methods of carrying anything from the weekly shop to children on bicycles. Certain countries rely heavily on bicycles and their culture has developed around the bicycle as a primary form of transport. In Europe, Denmark and the Netherlands have the most bicycles per capita and most often use bicycles for everyday transport.

Road bikes tend to have a more upright shape and a shorter wheelbase, which make the bike more mobile but harder to ride slowly. The design, coupled with low or dropped handlebars, requires the rider to bend forward more, making use of stronger muscles (particularly the gluteus maximus) and reducing air resistance at high speed.

Road bikes are designed for speed and efficiency on paved roads. They are characterized by their lightweight frames, skinny tires, drop handlebars, and narrow saddles. Road bikes are ideal for racing, long-distance riding, and fitness training.

Other common types of bikes include gravel bikes, designed for use on gravel roads or trails, but with the ability to ride well on pavement; mountain bikes, which are designed for more rugged, undulating terrain; and e-bikes, which provide some level of motorized assist for the rider. There are additional variations of bikes and types of biking as well.

The price of a new bicycle can range from US$50 to more than US$20,000 (the highest priced bike in the world is the custom Madone by Damien Hirst, sold at US$500,000), depending on quality, type and weight (the most exotic road bicycles can weigh as little as 3.2 kg (7 lb)). However, UCI regulations stipulate a legal race bike cannot weigh less than 6.8 kg (14.99 lbs). Being measured for a bike and taking it for a test ride are recommended before buying.

The drivetrain components of the bike should also be considered. A middle-grade derailleur is sufficient for a beginner, although many utility bikes are equipped with hub gears. If the rider plans a significant amount of hillclimbing, a triple-chainring crankset gear system may be preferred. Otherwise, the relatively lighter, simpler, and less expensive double chainring is preferred, even on high-end race bikes. Much simpler fixed-wheel bikes are also available.

Many road bikes, along with mountain bikes, include clipless pedals to which special shoes attach via a cleat, enabling the rider to pull on the pedals as well as push. Other possible accessories for the bicycle include front and rear lights, bells or horns, child carrying seats, cycling computers with GPS, locks, bar tape, fenders (mud-guards), baggage racks, baggage carriers and pannier bags, water bottles and bottle cages.

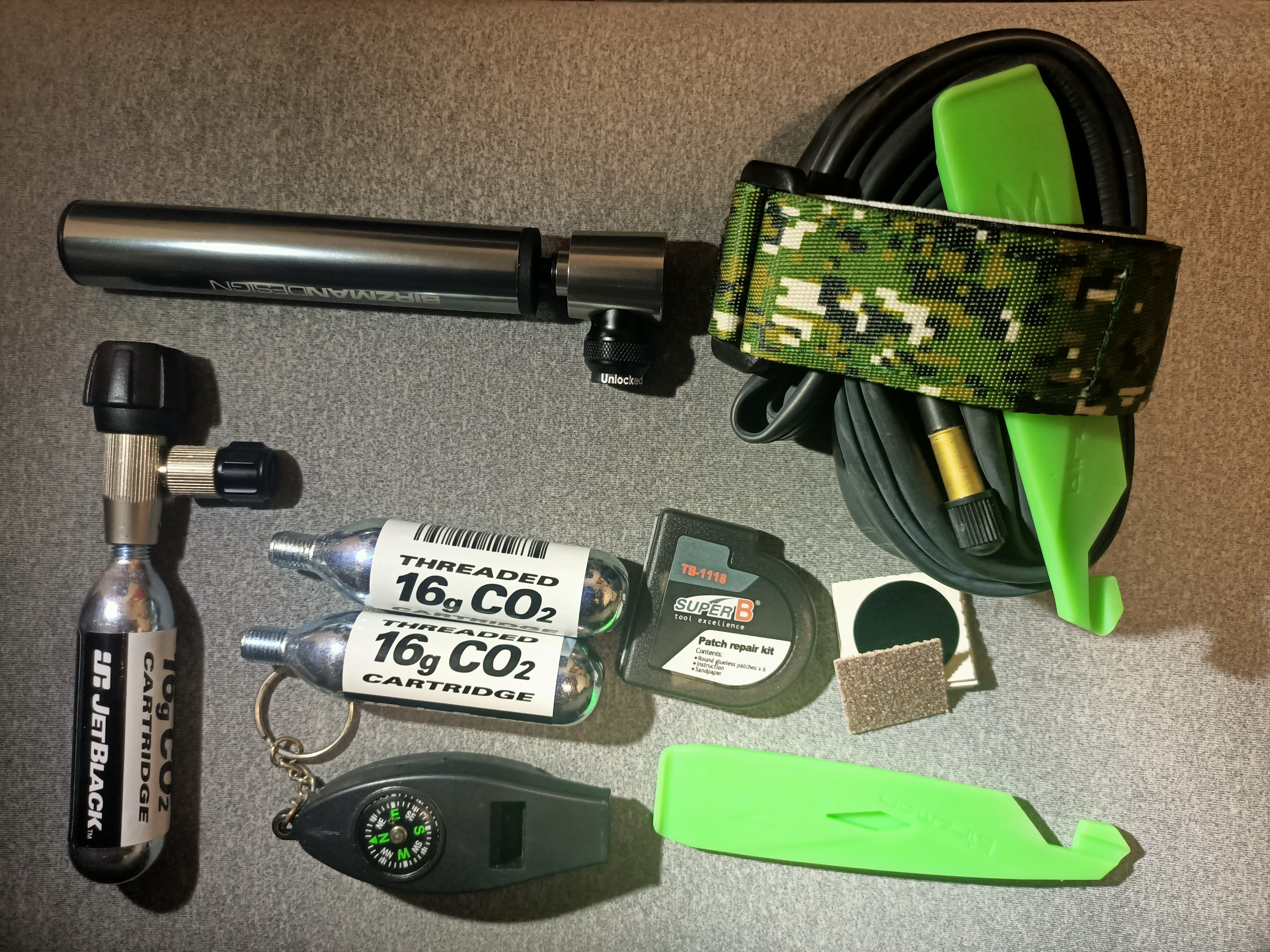
Cyclist's bicycle emergency kit with spare inner tube and tyre levers strapped together, plus mini pump, patch kit, compass, and CO₂ inflator with cylinders.

For basic maintenance and repairs cyclists can carry a pump (or a CO_{2} cartridge), a puncture repair kit, a spare inner tube, and tire levers and a set of allen keys. Cycling can be more efficient and comfortable with special shoes, gloves, and shorts. In wet weather, riding can be more tolerable with waterproof clothes, such as cape, jacket, trousers (pants) and overshoes and high-visibility clothing is advisable to reduce the risk from motor vehicle users.

Items legally required in some jurisdictions, or voluntarily adopted for safety reasons, include bicycle helmets, generator or battery operated lights, reflectors, and audible signalling devices such as a bell or horn. Extras include studded tires and a bicycle computer.

Bikes can also be heavily customized, with different seat designs and handle bars, for example. Gears can also be customized to better suit the rider's strength in relation to the terrain.

== Mode choice ==
Whether to cycle or use other modes of transportation relate to many factors influencing the mode choice decision for each trip. These include cycling infrastructure including surface, urban road space allocation and parking, perceived traffic safety, weather and climate, personal fitness, motivation and situation, route type including length and steepness, and the physical performance of the vehicle(s) available.

In favorable conditions, such as a medium-distance trip in pleasant weather and surroundings on a good surface that is flat or slightly downhill, probably most healthy people who can cycle and have a bicycle or similar available will use it, because the motive power required to travel at a comfortable speed is very small and not felt, due to the relatively low weight, low rolling resistance - of sufficiently inflated tires - and high mechanical efficiency of even basic bicycles. Yet acceleration from a low to a slightly higher speed is almost instantaneous and because of air resistance any desired level of exertion can be reached, or reduced at will. The comfortable level of exertion is higher than for most other physical activities because of the very effective convective cooling of the body by the air flow from the forward motion.

As soon as any of these listed factors become less favorable, motivation to cycle reduces, but can be increased again, for example with more specialized bicycles or suitable clothing.

== Skills ==
Many schools and police departments run educational programs to instruct children in bicycle handling skills, especially to introduce them to the rules of the road as they apply to cyclists. In some countries these may be known as bicycle rodeos, or operated as schemes such as Bikeability in the UK. Education for adult cyclists is available from organizations such as the League of American Bicyclists.

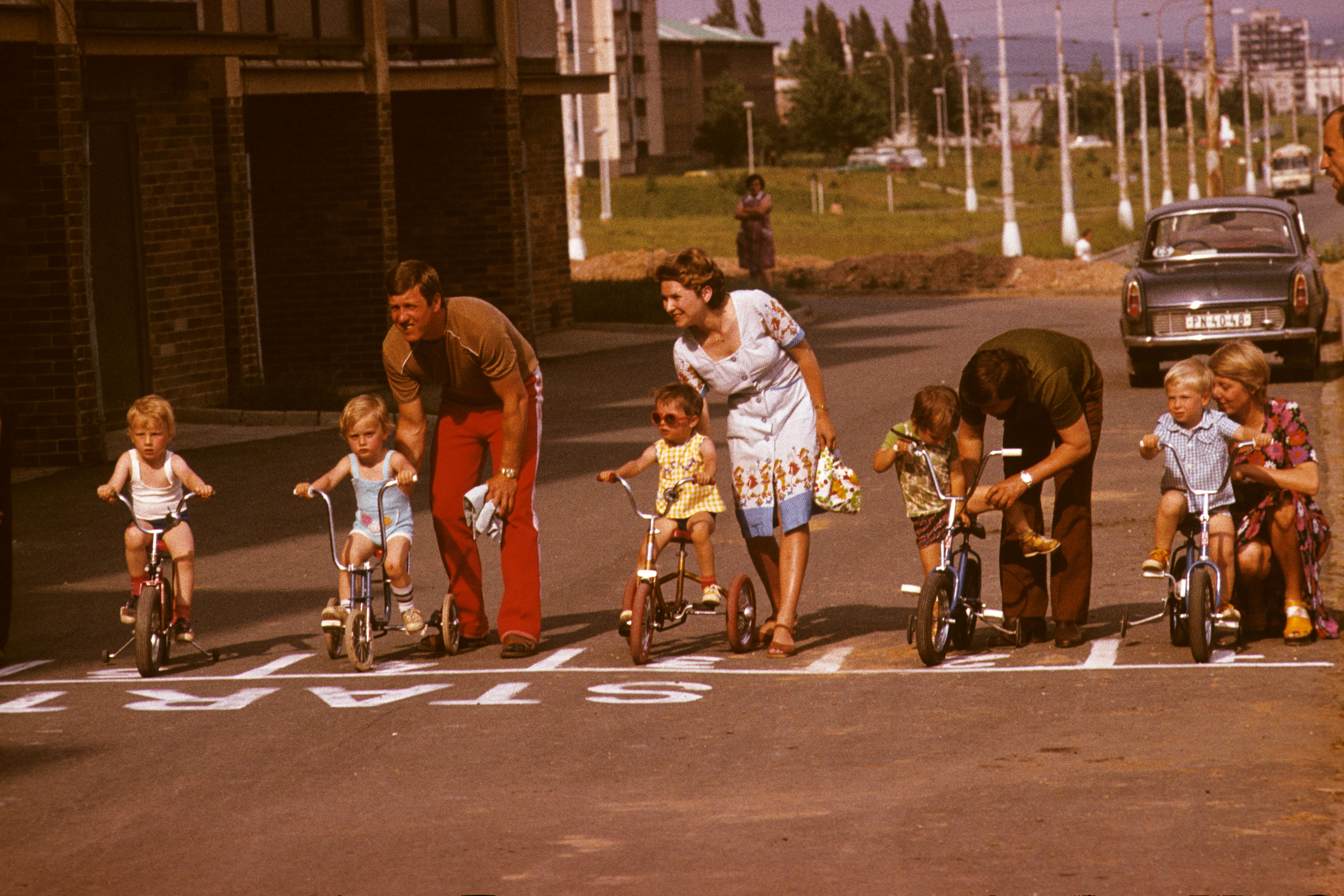
Children competition on side wheels in the eighties in Czechoslovakia

Beyond simply riding, another skill is riding efficiently and safely in traffic. One popular approach to riding in motor vehicle traffic is vehicular cycling, occupying road space as car does. Alternately, in countries such as Denmark and the Netherlands, where cycling is popular, cyclists are often segregated into bike lanes at the side of, or more often separate from, main highways and roads. Many primary schools participate in the national road test in which children individually complete a circuit on roads near the school while being observed by testers.

== Infrastructure ==
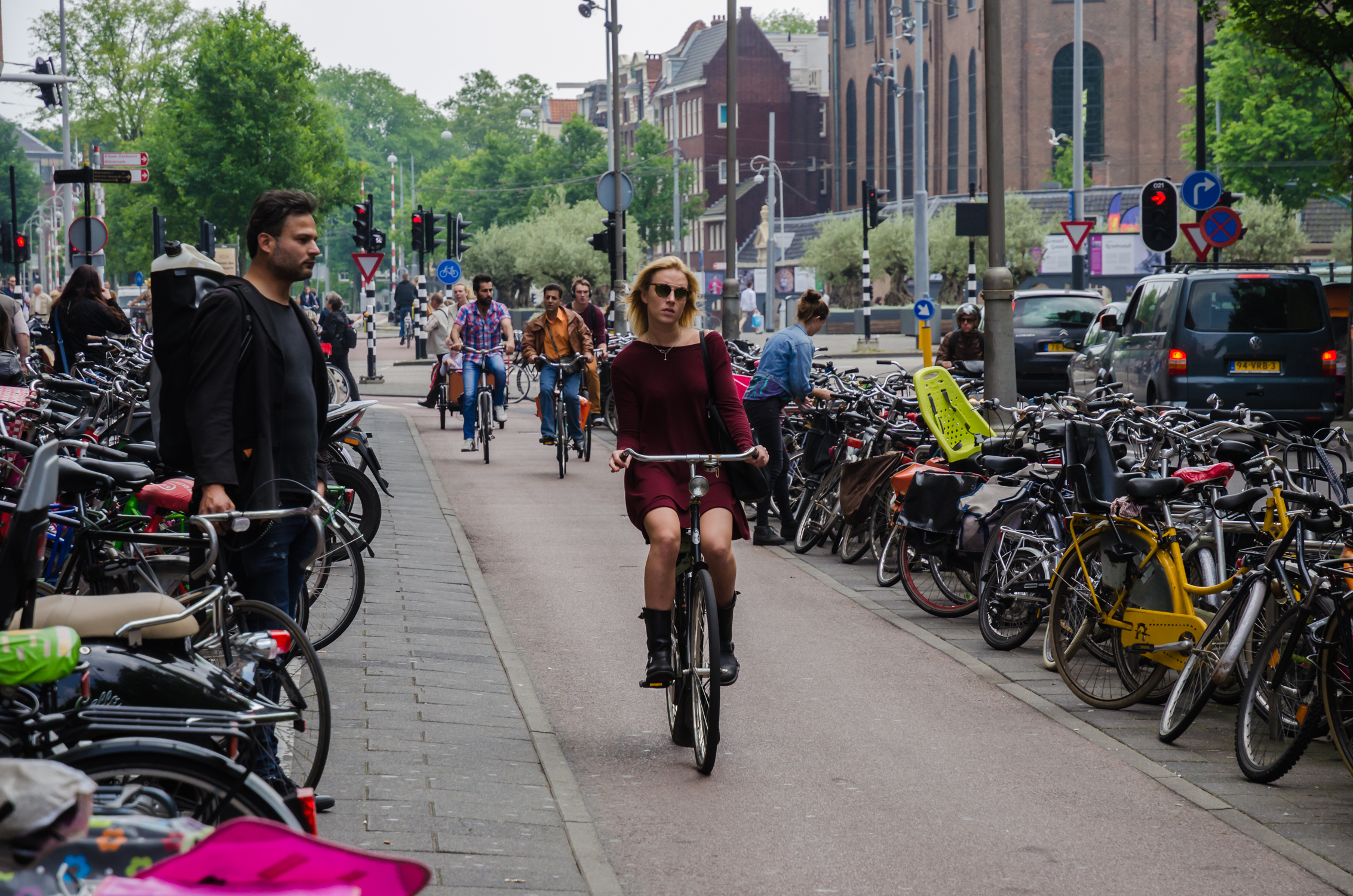
A bike path in Amsterdam. Bike paths are dedicated for cyclists and provide shelter from vehicle traffic.

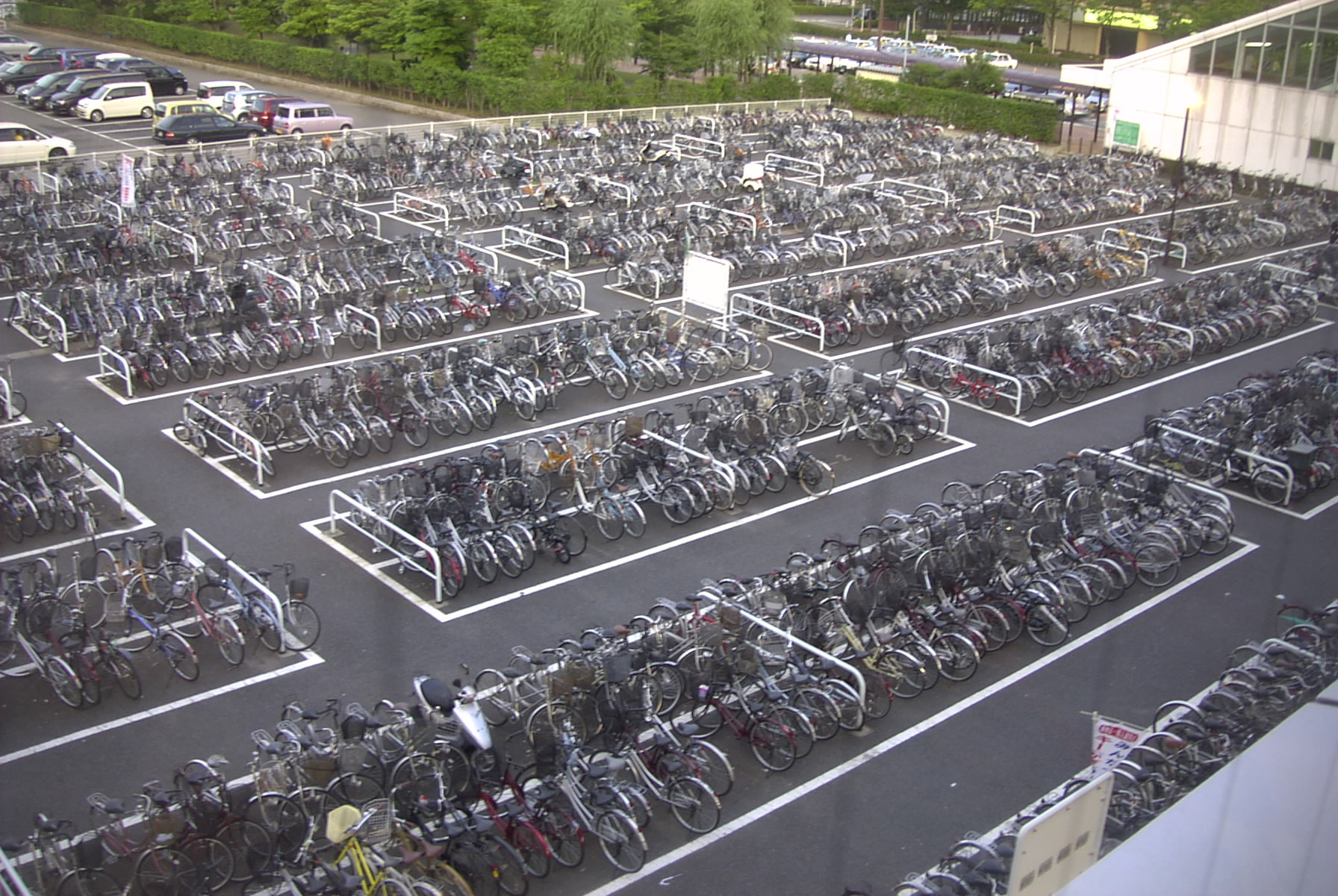
A parking lot for bicycles in Niigata, Japan

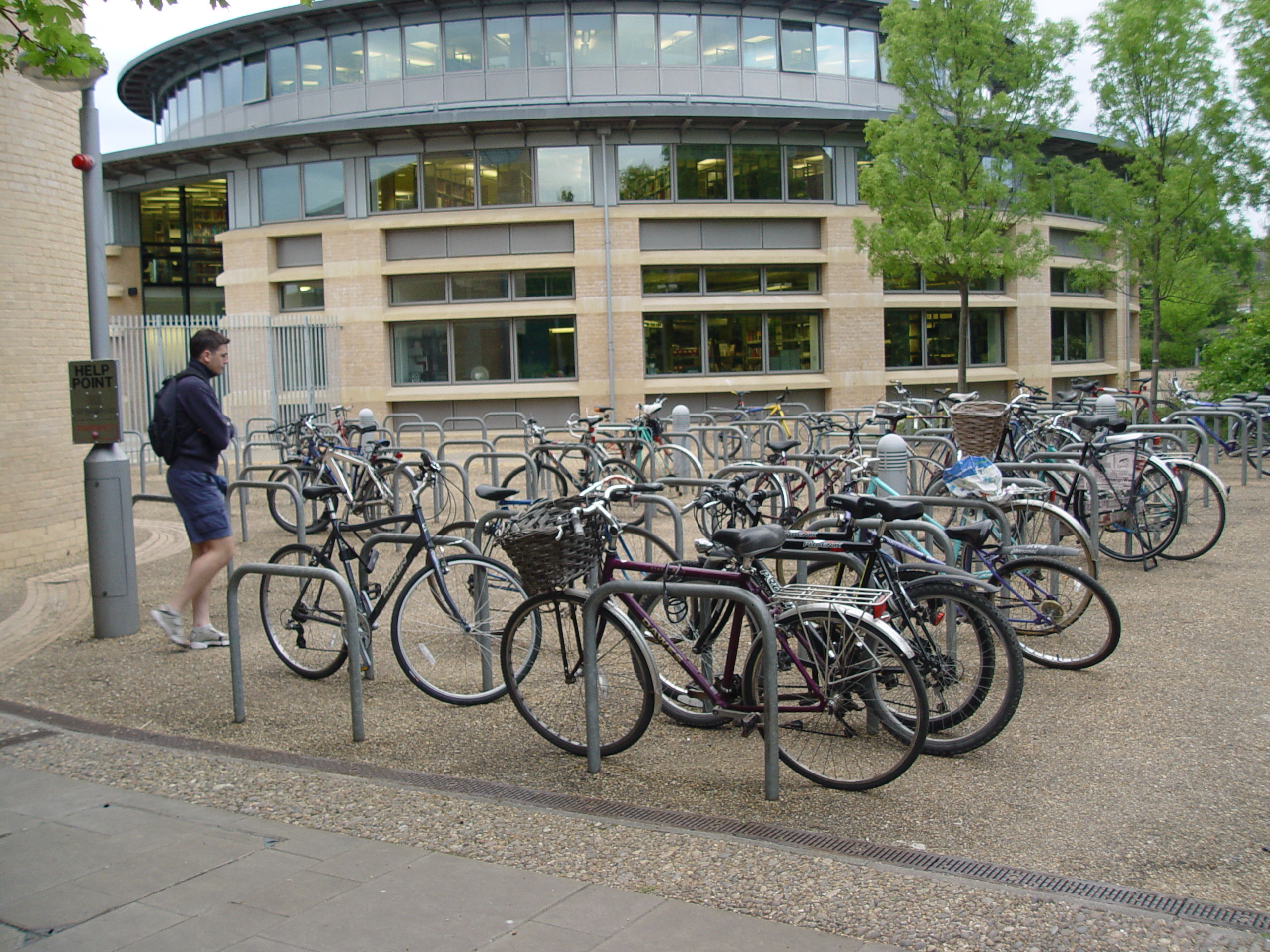
Bicycle stands outside the Centre for Mathematical Sciences at the University of Cambridge. Many students at the university opt to travel by bicycle.

Cyclists, pedestrians and motorists make different demands on road design which may lead to conflicts. Some jurisdictions give priority to motorized traffic, for example setting up one-way street systems, free-right turns, high capacity roundabouts, and slip roads. Others share priority with cyclists so as to encourage more cycling by applying varying combinations of traffic calming measures to limit the impact of motorized transport, and by building bike lanes, bike paths and cycle tracks. The provision of cycling infrastructure varies widely between cities and countries, particularly since cycling for transportation almost entirely occurs in public streets. And, the development of computer vision and street view imagery has provided significant potential to assess infrastructure for cyclists.

In jurisdictions where motor vehicles were given priority, cycling has tended to decline while in jurisdictions where cycling infrastructure was built, cycling rates have remained steady or increased. Occasionally, extreme measures against cycling may occur. In Shanghai, where bicycles were once the dominant mode of transport, bicycle travel on a few city roads was banned temporarily in December 2003.

In areas in which cycling is popular and encouraged, cycle-parking facilities using bicycle stands, lockable mini-garages, and patrolled cycle parks are used to reduce theft. Local governments promote cycling by permitting bicycles to be carried on public transport or by providing external attachment devices on public transport vehicles. Conversely, an absence of secure cycle-parking is a recurring complaint by cyclists from cities with low modal share of cycling.

Extensive cycling infrastructure may be found in some cities. Such dedicated paths in some cities often have to be shared with in-line skaters, scooters, skateboarders, and pedestrians. Dedicated cycling infrastructure is treated differently in the law of every jurisdiction, including the question of liability of users in a collision. There is also some debate about the safety of the various types of separated facilities.

Bicycles are considered a sustainable mode of transport, especially suited for urban use and relatively shorter distances when used for transport (compared to recreation). Case studies and good practices (from European cities and some worldwide examples) that promote and stimulate this kind of functional cycling in cities can be found at Eltis, Europe's portal for local transport.

A number of cities, including Paris, London and Barcelona, now have successful bike hire schemes designed to help people cycle in the city. Typically these feature utilitarian city bikes which lock into docking stations, released on payment for set time periods. Costs vary from city to city. In London, initial hire access costs £2 per day. The first 30 minutes of each trip is free, with £2 for each additional 30 minutes until the bicycle is returned.

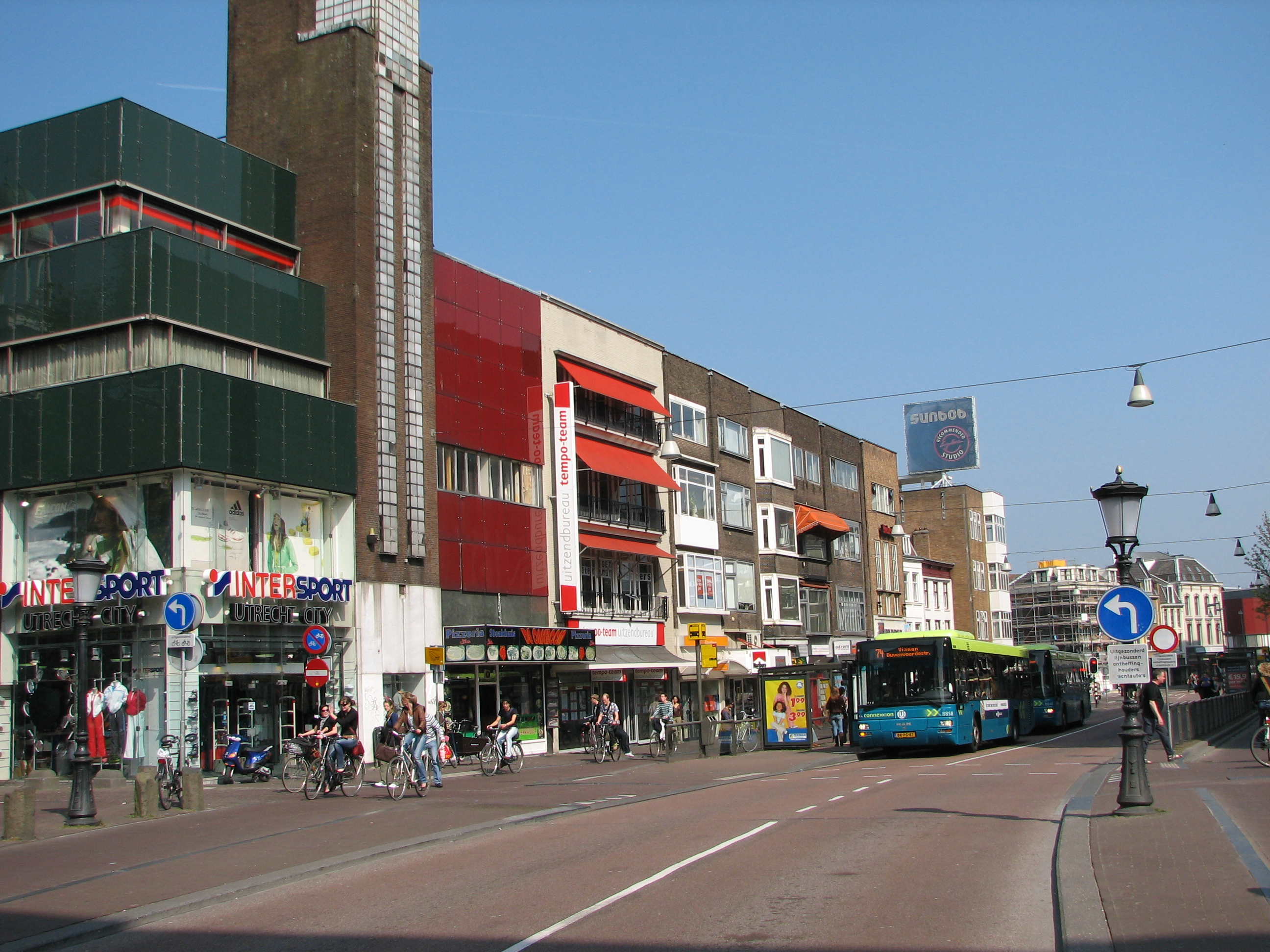
The safe physically separated Fietspad in the Netherlands, keeping cyclists away from traffic as seen in Utrecht

In the Netherlands, many roads have one or two separate cycleways alongside them, or cycle lanes marked on the road. On roads where adjacent bike paths or cycle tracks exist, the use of these facilities is compulsory, and cycling on the main carriageway is not permitted. Some 35,000 km of cycle-track has been physically segregated from motor traffic, equal to a quarter of the country's entire 140,000 km road network. A quarter of all trips in the country are made on bicycles, one quarter of them to work. Even the prime minister goes to work by bicycle, when weather permits. This saves the lives of 6,000 citizens per year, prolongs life expectancy by 6 months, saves the country 20 million dollars per year, and prevents 150 grams of CO_{2} from being emitted per kilometer of cycling.

== Types ==
=== Utility ===
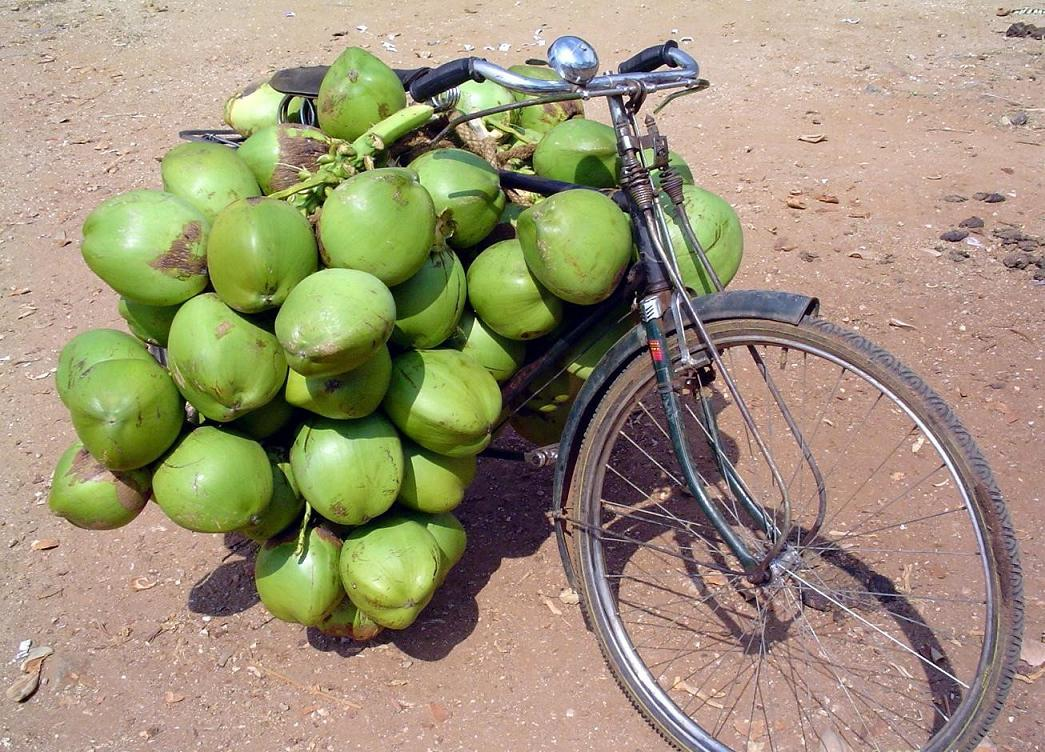
A bicycle loaded with tender coconuts for sale in Karnataka, India

Utility cycling refers both to cycling as a mode of daily commuting transport as well as the use of a bicycle in a commercial activity, mainly to transport goods, mostly accomplished in an urban environment.

The postal services of many countries have long relied on bicycles. The British Royal Mail first started using bicycles in 1880; now bicycle delivery fleets include 37,000 in the UK, 25,700 in Germany, 10,500 in Hungary and 7000 in Sweden. In Australia, Australia Post has also reintroduced bicycle postal deliveries on some routes due to an inability to recruit sufficient licensed riders willing to use their uncomfortable motorbikes. The London Ambulance Service has recently introduced bicycling paramedics, who can often get to the scene of an incident in Central London more quickly than a motorized ambulance.

The use of bicycles by police has been increasing, since they provide greater accessibility to bicycle and pedestrian zones and allow access when roads are congested. In some cases, bicycle officers have been used as a supplement or a replacement for horseback officers.

Bicycles enjoy use as general delivery vehicles in many countries. In the United Kingdom and North America, as their first jobs, teenagers have worked at delivering newspapers by bicycle. London has many delivery companies that use bicycles with trailers. Most cities in the West, and many outside it, support an industry of cycle couriers who deliver documents and small packages. In India, many of Mumbai's Dabbawalas use bicycles to deliver home cooked lunches to the city's workers. In Bogotá, Colombia, the city's largest bakery recently replaced most of its delivery trucks with bicycles. The car industry also uses bicycles. At the Mercedes-Benz factory in Sindelfingen, Germany, workers use bicycles, color-coded by department, to move around the factory.

=== Recreational ===
==== Bicycle touring ====
In the Netherlands, bicycles are freely available for use in the Hoge Veluwe National Park.

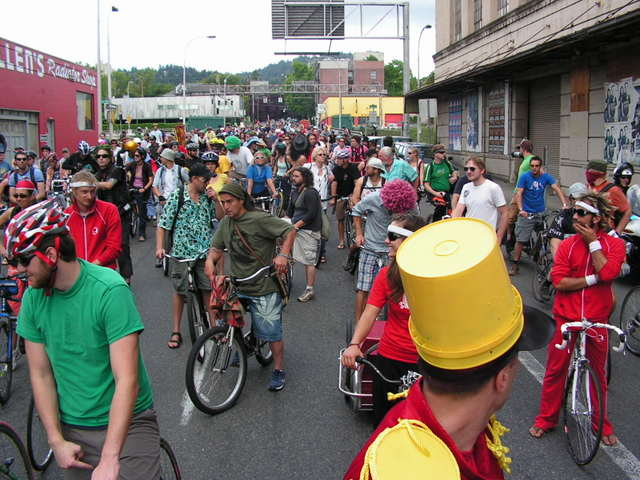
Tour de Fat group ride in Portland, Oregon

Bicycles are used for recreation at all ages. Bicycle touring, also known as cyclotourism, involves touring and exploration or sightseeing by bicycle for leisure. Bicycle tourism has been one of the most popular sports for recreational benefit. A brevet or randonnée is an organized long-distance ride.

One popular Dutch pleasure is the enjoyment of relaxed cycling in the countryside of the Netherlands. The land is very flat and full of public bicycle trails and cycle tracks where cyclists are not bothered by cars and other traffic, which makes it ideal for cycling recreation. Many Dutch people subscribe every year to an event called fietsvierdaagse — four days of organised cycling through the local environment. Paris–Brest–Paris (PBP), which began in 1891, is the oldest bicycling event still run on a regular basis on the open road, covers over 1,200 km (746 mi) and imposes a 90-hour time limit. Similar if smaller institutions exist in many countries.

A study conducted in Taiwan improved the environmental quality for bicyclist tourists which demonstrated greater health benefits in tourists and even in natives. The number of bicyclists in Taiwan increased from 700,000 in 2008 to 5.1 million in 2017. Thus, this resulted in more and safer bicycle routes to be established. When cycling, cyclists take into account the safety on the road, bicycle lanes, road surface quality, diverse scenery, and ride length. Thus, the environment plays a huge role in people's decision factor to use bicycle touring more. This study used many questionnaires and conducted statistical analysis to come up with the conclusion of cyclists' top 5 factors that they consider before making a decision to bike are: safety, lighting facility, design of lanes, the surrounding landscape, and how clean the environment is. Thus, after improving these 5 factors, they found much more recreational benefits to bicycle tourism.

==== Organized rides ====
Many cycling clubs hold organized rides in which bicyclists of all levels participate. The typical organized ride starts with a large group of riders, called the mass, bunch or even peloton. This will thin out over the course of the ride. Many riders choose to ride together in groups of the same skill level to take advantage of drafting.

Most organized rides, for example cyclosportives (or gran fondos), Challenge Rides or reliability trials, and hill climbs include registration requirements and will provide information either through the mail or online concerning start times and other requirements. Rides usually consist of several different routes, sorted by mileage, and with a certain number of rest stops that usually include refreshments, first aid and maintenance tools. Routes can vary by as much as 100 miles (160 km).

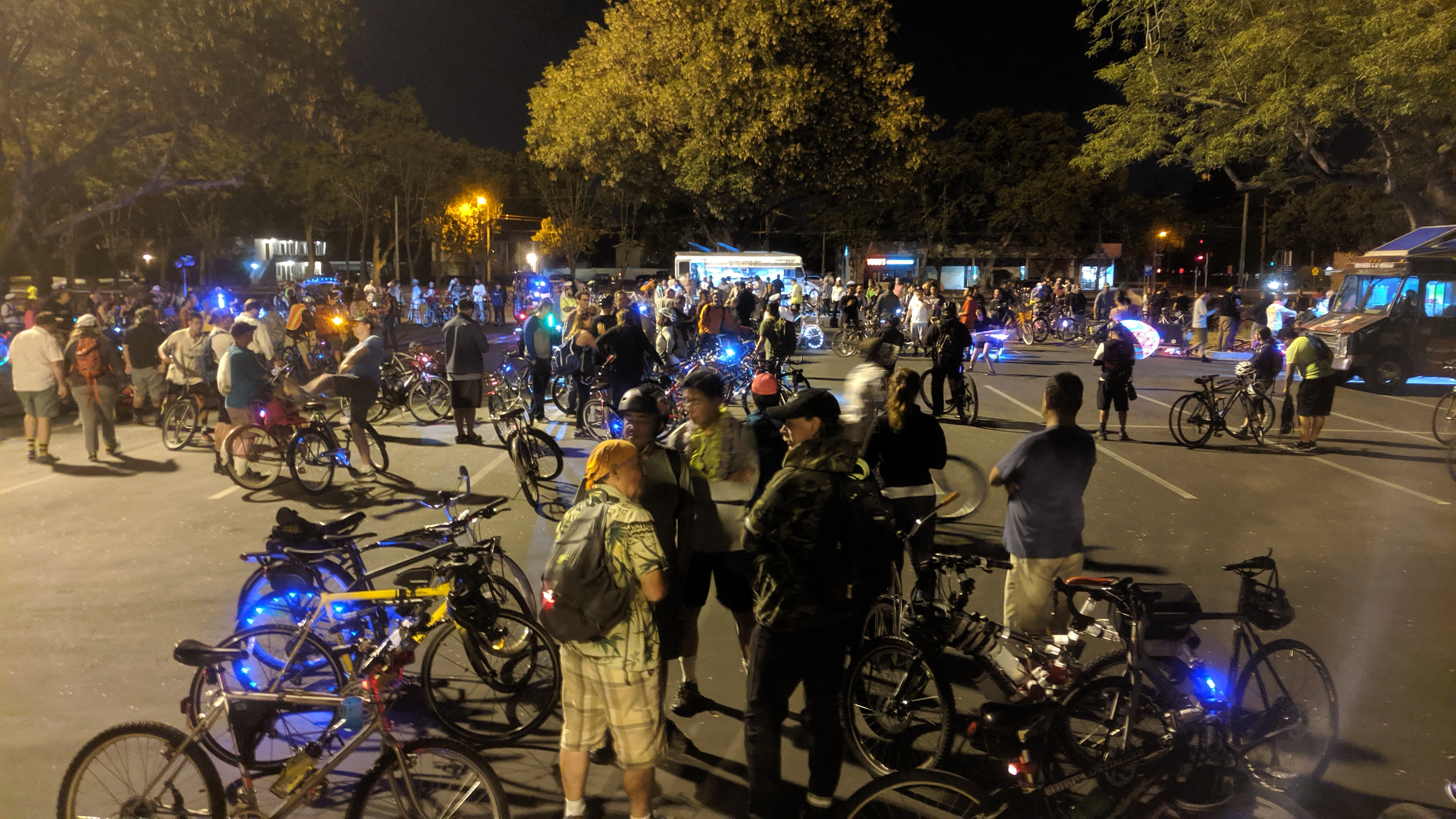
San Jose Bike Party in San Jose, California (July 2019)

Some organized rides are entirely social events. One example is the monthly San Jose Bike Party which can reach attendance of one to two thousand riders in Summer months.

==== Mountain ====
Mountain biking began in the 1970s, originally as a downhill sport, practised on customized cruiser bicycles around Mount Tamalpais. Most mountain biking takes place on dirt roads, trails and in purpose-built parks. Downhill mountain biking has just evolved in the recent years and is performed at places such as Whistler Mountain Bike Park. Slopestyle, a form of downhill, is when riders do tricks such as tailwhips, 360s, backflips and front flips. There are several disciplines of mountain biking besides downhill, including: cross country (often referred to as XC), all mountain, trail, free ride, and newly popular enduro.

In 2020, due to COVID-19, mountain bikes saw a surge in popularity in the US, with some vendors reporting that they were sold out of bikes under US$1000.

==== Other ====
The Marching and Cycling Band HHK from Haarlem (the Netherlands) is one of the few marching bands around the world which also performs on bicycles.

=== Racing ===
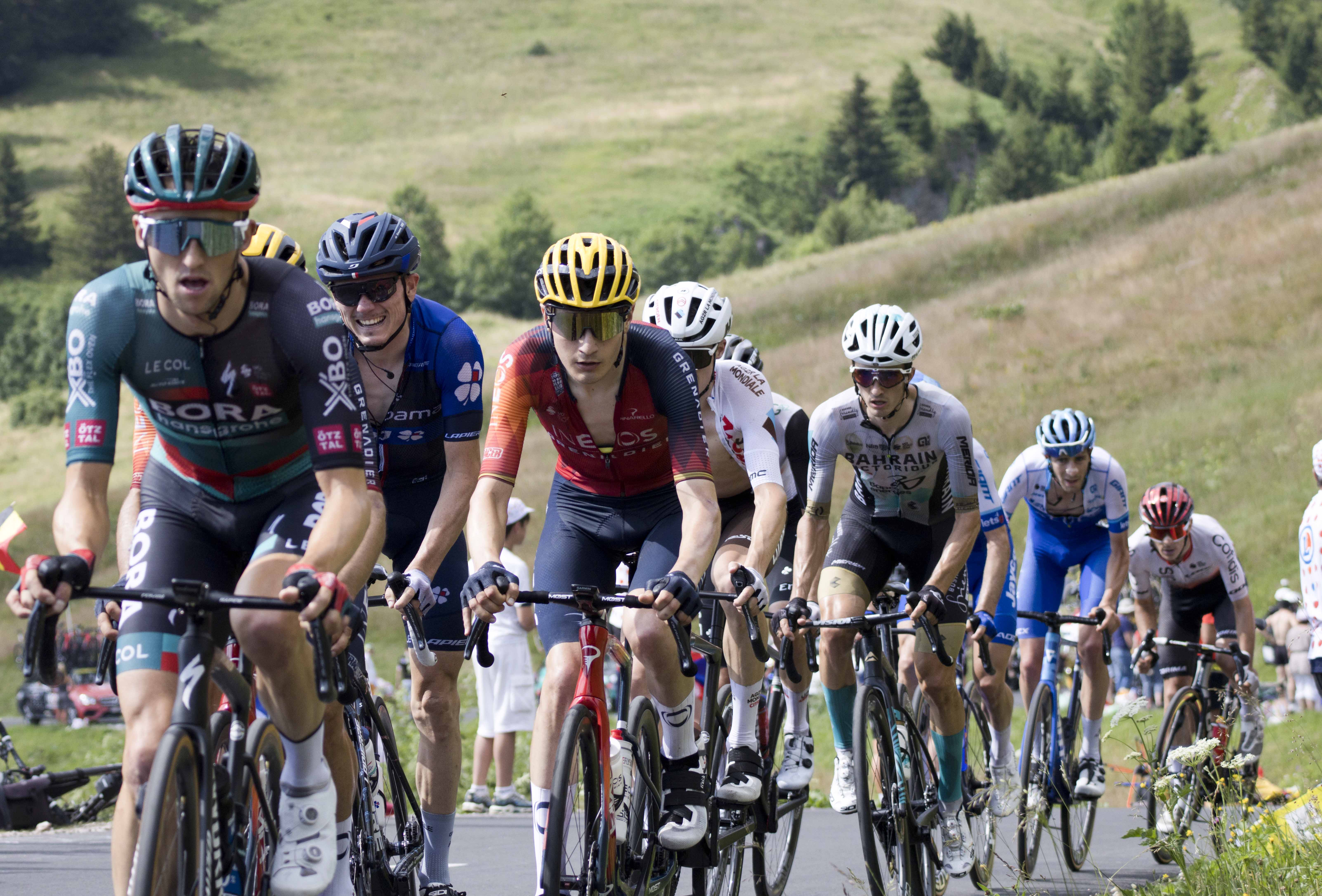
Tour de France cyclists racing

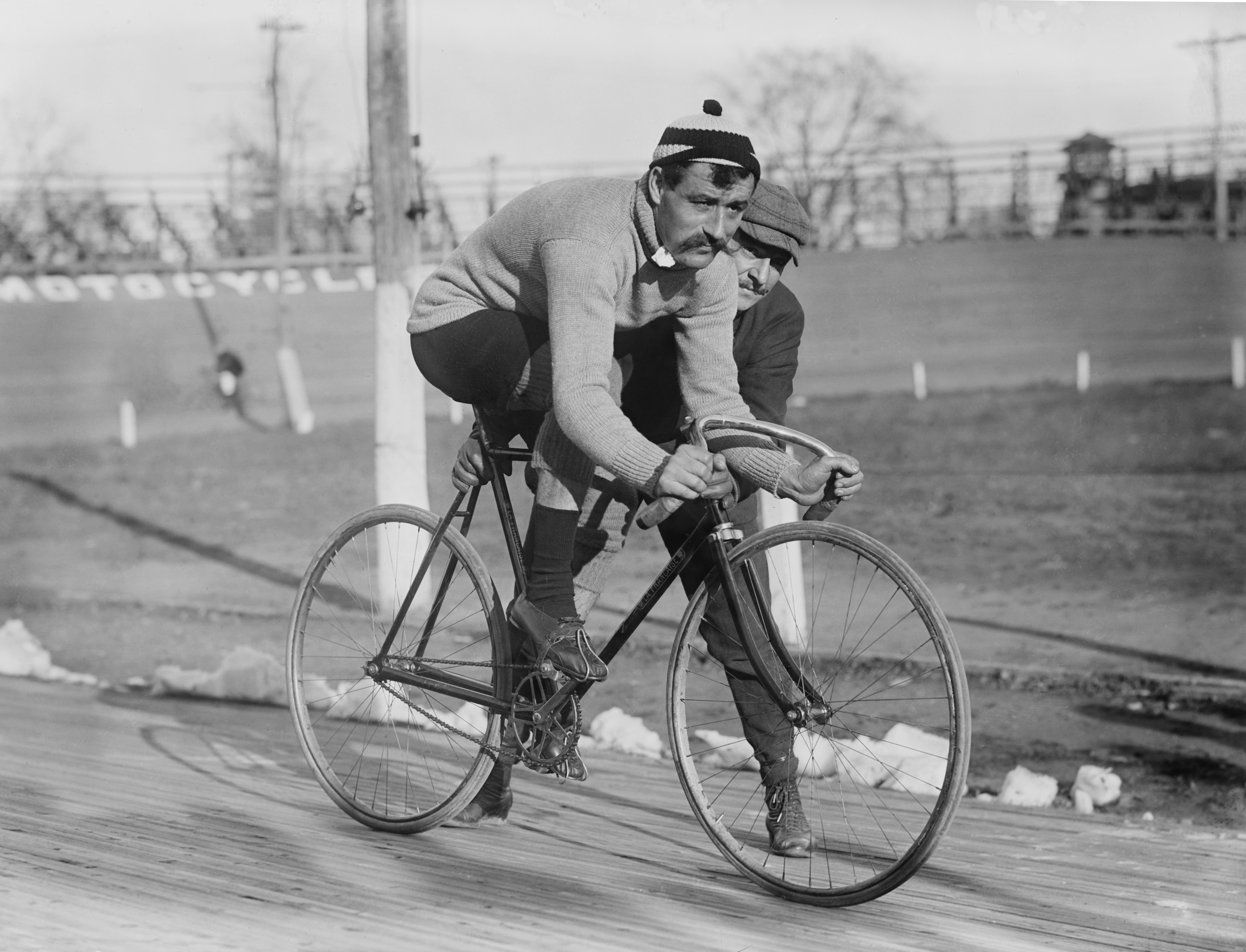
Bicycle racing in 1909

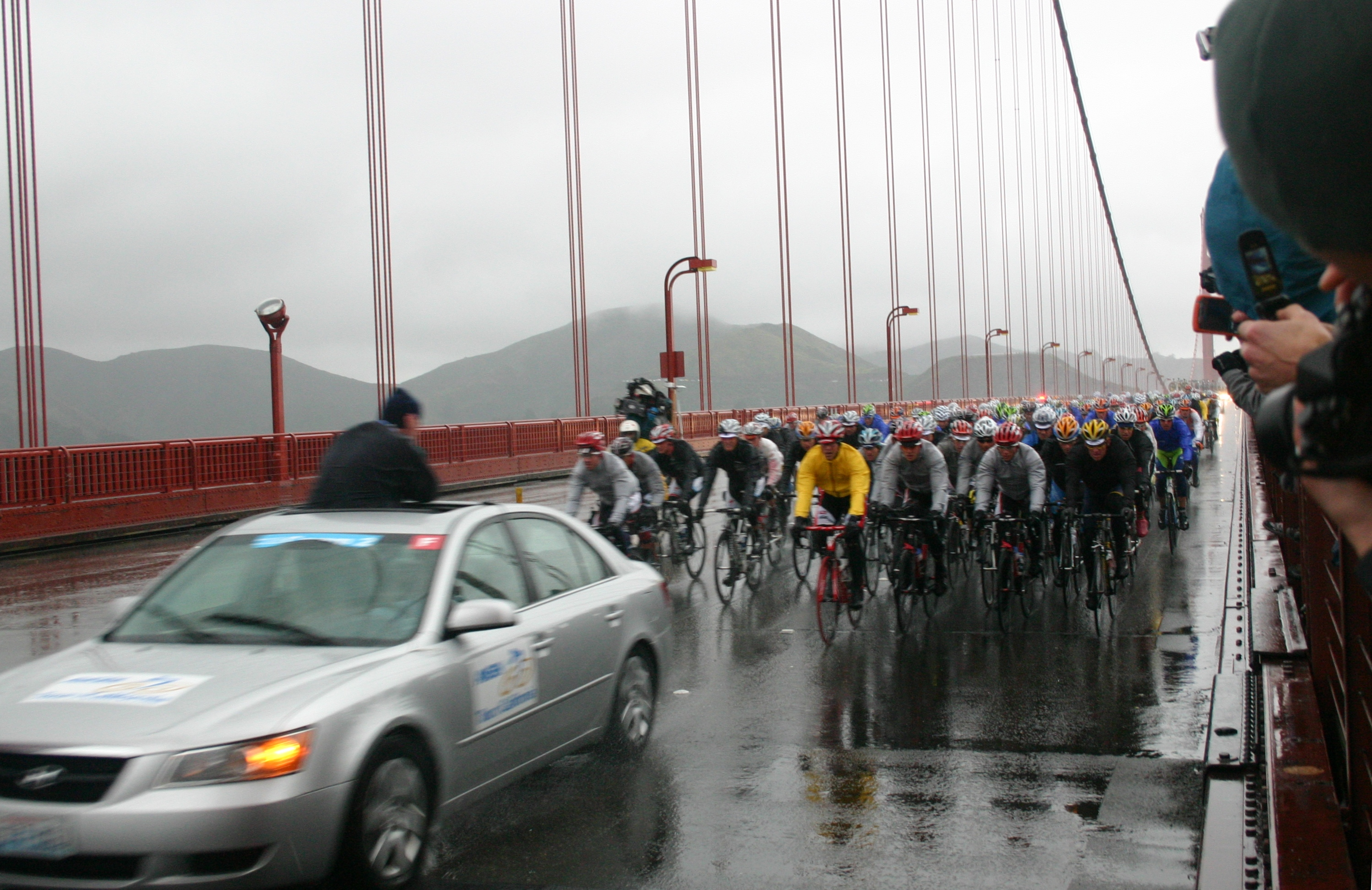
A peloton of professional bicycle racers on the Golden Gate Bridge

Shortly after the introduction of bicycles, competitions developed independently in many parts of the world. Early races involving boneshaker style bicycles were predictably fraught with injuries. Large races became popular during the 1890s "Golden Age of Cycling", with events across Europe, and in the U.S. and Japan as well. At one point, almost every major city in the US had a velodrome or two for track racing events, however since the middle of the 20th century cycling has become a minority sport in the US whilst in Continental Europe it continues to be a major sport, particularly in the United Kingdom, France, Belgium, Italy and Spain. The most famous of all bicycle races is the Tour de France. This began in 1903, and continues to capture the attention of the sporting world.

In 1899, Charles Minthorn Murphy became the first man to ride his bicycle a mile in under a minute (hence his nickname, Mile-a-Minute Murphy), which he did by drafting a locomotive at New York's Long Island.

As the bicycle evolved its various forms, different racing formats developed. Road races may involve both team and individual competition, and are contested in various ways. They range from the one-day road race, criterium, and time trial to multi-stage events like the Tour de France and its sister events which make up cycling's Grand Tours. Recumbent bicycles were banned from bike races in 1934 after Marcel Berthet set a new hour record in his Velodyne streamliner (49.992 km on 18 November 1933). Track bicycles are used for track cycling in Velodromes, while cyclo-cross races are held on outdoor terrain, including pavement, grass, and mud. Cyclocross races feature human-made features such as small barriers which riders either bunny hop over or dismount and walk over. Time trial races, another form of road racing require a rider to ride against the clock. Time trials can be performed as a team or as a single rider. Bikes are changed for time trial races, using aero bars. In the past decade, mountain bike racing has also reached international popularity and is even an Olympic sport.

Professional racing organizations place limitations on the bicycles that can be used in the races that they sanction. For example, the Union Cycliste Internationale, the governing body of international cycle sport (which sanctions races such as the Tour de France), decided in the late 1990s to create additional rules which prohibit racing bicycles weighing less than 6.8 kilograms (14.96 pounds). The UCI rules also effectively ban some bicycle frame innovations (such as the recumbent bicycle) by requiring a double triangle structure.

== Activism ==
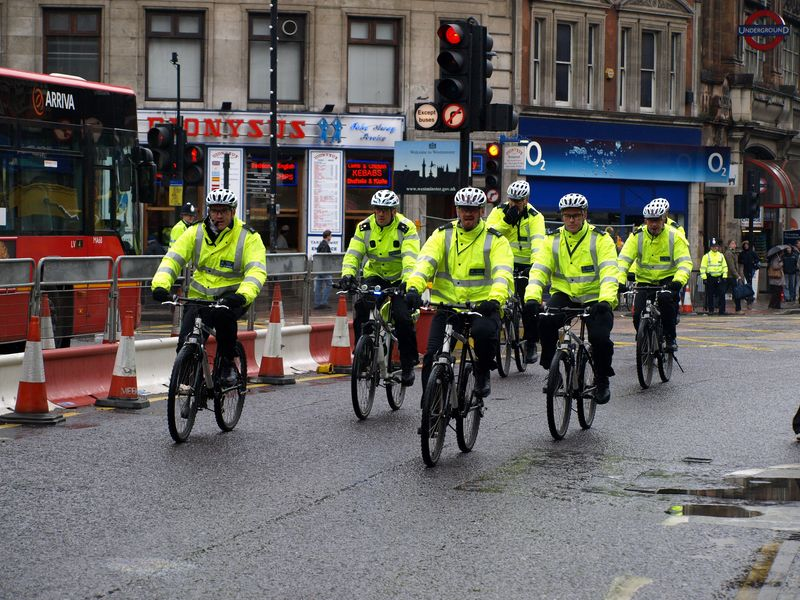
Metropolitan Police patrolling on bikes in London

Many broad and correlated themes run in bicycle activism: one is about advocating the bicycle as an alternative mode of transport, and another is about the creation of conditions to permit or encourage bicycle use, both for utility and recreational cycling. Although the first emphasizes the potential for energy and resource conservation and health benefits gained from cycling versus automobile use, is relatively undisputed, the second is the subject of much debate.

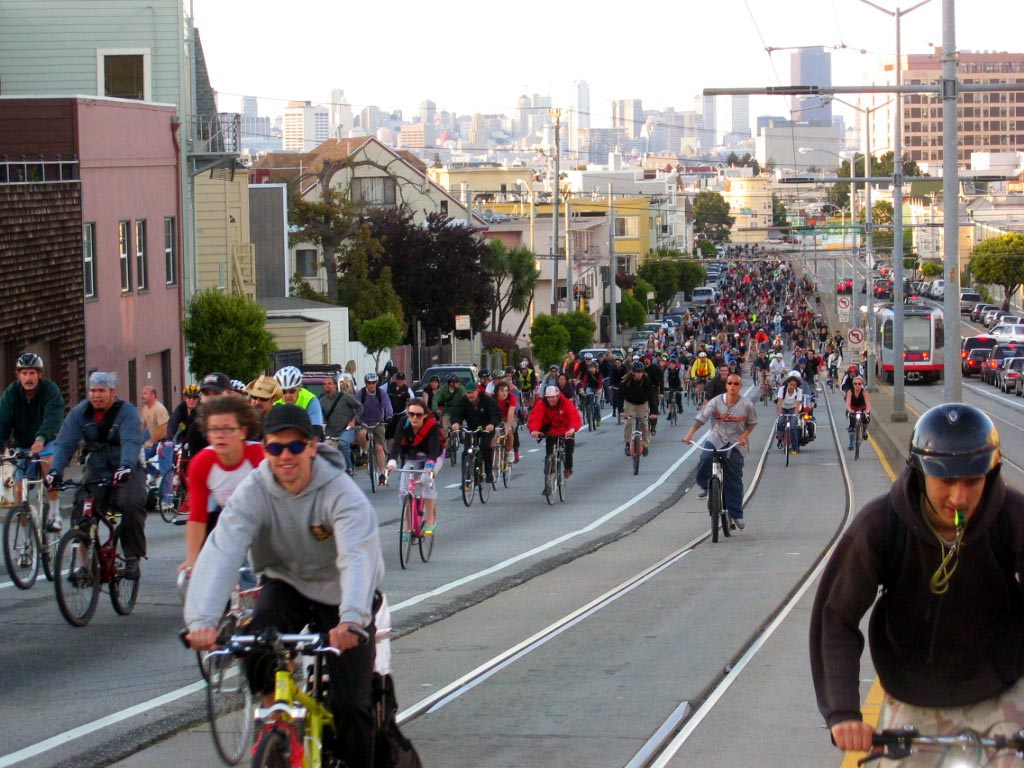
San Francisco Critical Mass, 29 April 2005

It is generally agreed that improved local and inter-city rail services and other methods of mass transportation (including greater provision for cycle carriage on such services) create conditions to encourage bicycle use. However, there are different opinions on the role of various types of cycling infrastructure in building bicycle-friendly cities and roads.

Some bicycle activists (including some traffic management advisers) seek the construction of bike paths, cycle tracks and bike lanes for journeys of all lengths and point to their success in promoting safety and encouraging more people to cycle. Some activists, especially those from the vehicular cycling tradition, view the safety, practicality, and intent of such facilities with suspicion. They favor a more holistic approach based on the 4 'E's: education (of everyone involved), encouragement (to apply the education), enforcement (to protect the rights of others), and engineering (to facilitate travel while respecting every person's equal right to do so). Some groups offer training courses to help cyclists integrate themselves with other traffic.

Critical Mass is an event typically held on the last Friday of every month in cities around the world where bicyclists take to the streets en masse. While the ride was founded with the idea of drawing attention to how unfriendly the city was to bicyclists, the leaderless structure of Critical Mass makes it impossible to assign it any one specific goal. In fact, the purpose of Critical Mass is not formalized beyond the direct action of meeting at a set location and time and traveling as a group through city streets.

There is a long-running cycle helmet debate among activists. The most heated controversy surrounds the topic of compulsory helmet use. Some countries require cyclists to wear helmets, as this may protect riders from head injuries. Countries which require adult cyclists to wear helmets include Spain, New Zealand and Australia. Mandatory helmet wearing is one of the most controversial topics in the cycling world, with proponents arguing that it reduces head injuries and thus is an acceptable requirement, while opponents argue that by making cycling seem more dangerous and cumbersome, it reduces cyclist numbers on the streets, creating an overall negative health effect (fewer people cycling for their own health, and the remaining cyclists being more exposed through a reversed safety in numbers effect).

It is paradoxical that in many developing countries cycling is in decline as bicycles are replaced by motorbikes and cars, while in many developed countries cycling is on the rise.

=== Equality ===
Within western societies the demographic of those who cycle is often not representative of broader society. Research by TfL in London, UK, suggests that cyclists in London are typically 'white, under 40, male, with medium to high household income.' Studies from large-scale representative data from Germany show that people with higher levels of education cycle substantially more often than those with lower levels of education. Even for trips of the same distance and among people from the same city with the same income level, those with higher education cycle more. As a result, there are various forms of activism focused on diversifying the cycling community. Inspired by the Black Lives Matter movement are organizations such as Street Riders NYC that seek to protest while on bicycles about systemic racism and police brutality. An incidental experience for Street Riders NYC protest participants is the inequity in where safe bicycling infrastructure exists by neighbourhood, which is interpreted as a form of classism within cycling and urbanism. The bicycle has acted as a means for women's liberation and thus has links to feminism.

== Associations ==
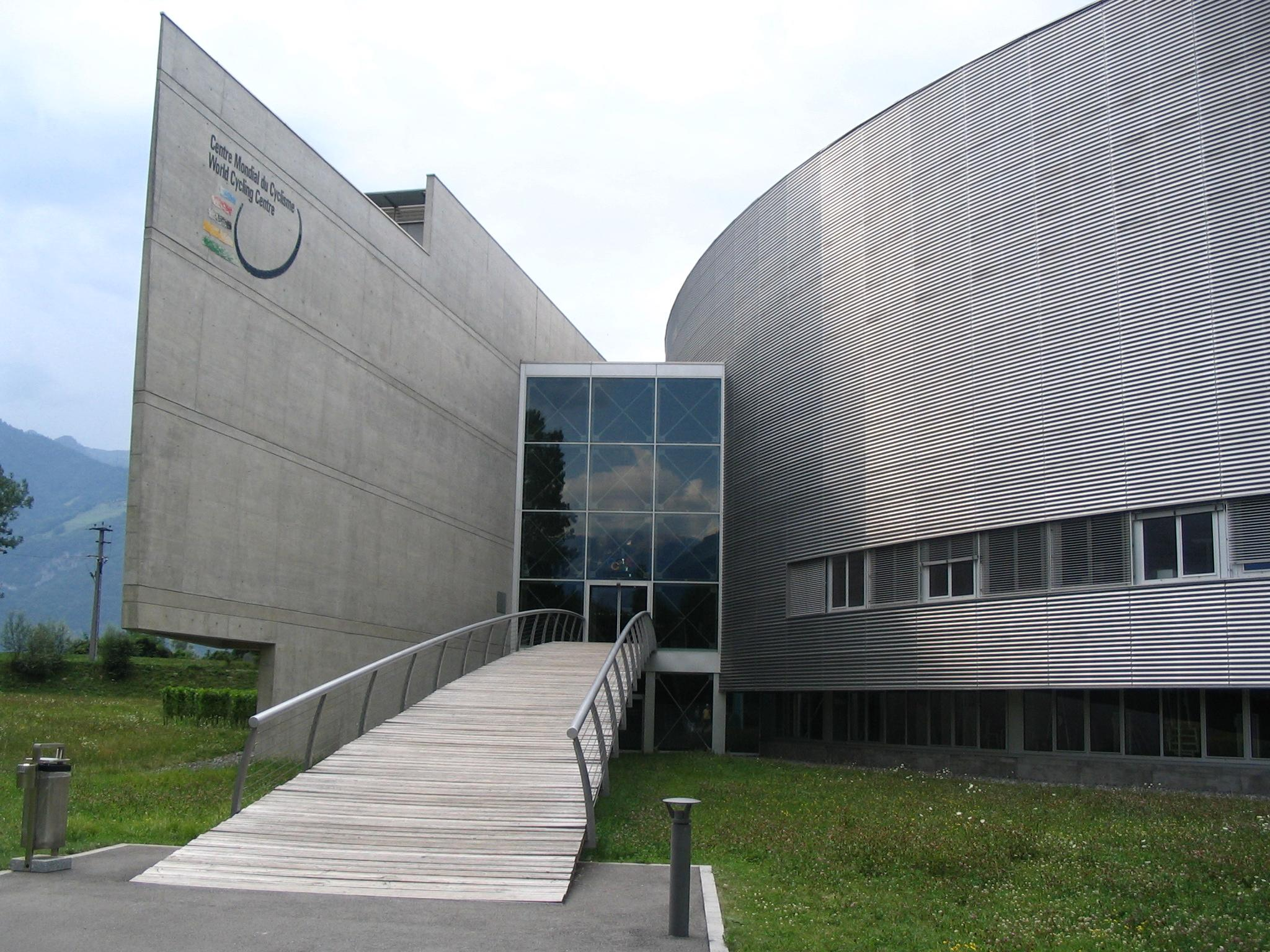
Headquarters of the Union Cycliste Internationale in Switzerland

Cyclists form associations, both for specific interests (trails development, road maintenance, bike maintenance, urban design, racing clubs, touring clubs, etc.) and for more global goals (energy conservation, pollution reduction, promotion of fitness). Some bicycle clubs and national associations became prominent advocates for improvements to roads and highways. In the United States, the League of American Wheelmen (founded in 1880 and changing to the League of American Bicyclists in 1994) lobbied for the improvement of roads in the last part of the 19th century, founding and leading the national Good Roads Movement. Their model for political organization, as well as the paved roads for which they argued, facilitated the growth of the automobile.

In Europe, the European Cyclists' Federation represents around 70 local, regional and national civil society organisations across more than 40 countries that work to promote cycling as a mode of transport and leisure.

As a sport, cycling is governed internationally by the Union Cycliste Internationale in Switzerland, USA Cycling (merged with the United States Cycling Federation in 1995) in the United States, (for upright bicycles) and by the International Human Powered Vehicle Association (for other HPVs, or human-powered vehicles). Cycling for transport and touring is promoted on a European level by the European Cyclists' Federation, with associated members from Great Britain, Japan and elsewhere. Regular conferences on cycling as transport are held under the auspices of Velo City; global conferences are coordinated by Velo Mondial.

== Cycling as a means of transportation ==
Cycling is widely regarded as an effective and efficient mode of transportation optimal for short to moderate distances.

Bicycles provide numerous possible benefits in comparison with motor vehicles, including the sustained physical exercise involved in cycling, easier parking, increased maneuverability, and access to roads, bike paths and rural trails. Cycling also offers a reduced consumption of fossil fuels, less air and noise pollution, reduced greenhouse gas emissions, and greatly reduced traffic congestion. These have a lower financial cost for users as well as for society at large (negligible damage to roads, less road area required). By fitting bicycle racks on the front of buses, transit agencies can significantly increase the areas they can serve.

Among the disadvantages of cycling are the requirement of bicycles (excepting tricycles or quadricycles) for the rider to have certain level of basic skill to remain upright, the reduced protection in crashes in comparison to motor vehicles, often longer travel time (except in densely populated areas), vulnerability to weather conditions, difficulty in transporting passengers, and the fact that a basic level of fitness is required for cycling moderate to long distances.

== Health effects ==
Cycling provides a variety of health benefits and reduces the risk of cancers, heart disease, and diabetes that are prevalent in sedentary lifestyles. Cycling on stationary bikes have also been used as part of rehabilitation for lower limb injuries, particularly after hip surgery. Individuals who cycle regularly have also reported mental health improvements, including less perceived stress and better vitality.

The health benefits of cycling outweigh the risks when compared to a sedentary lifestyle. A Dutch study found that cycling can extend lifespans by up to 14 months, but the risks equated to a reduced lifespan of 40 days or less. Mortality rate reduction was found to be directly correlated to the average time spent cycling, totaling to approximately 6500 deaths prevented by cycling. Cycling in the Netherlands is often safer than in other parts of the world, so the risk-benefit ratio will be different in other regions. Overall, benefits of cycling or walking have been shown to exceed risks by ratios of 9:1 to 96:1 when compared with no exercise at all, including a wide variety of physical and mental outcomes.

=== Exercise ===
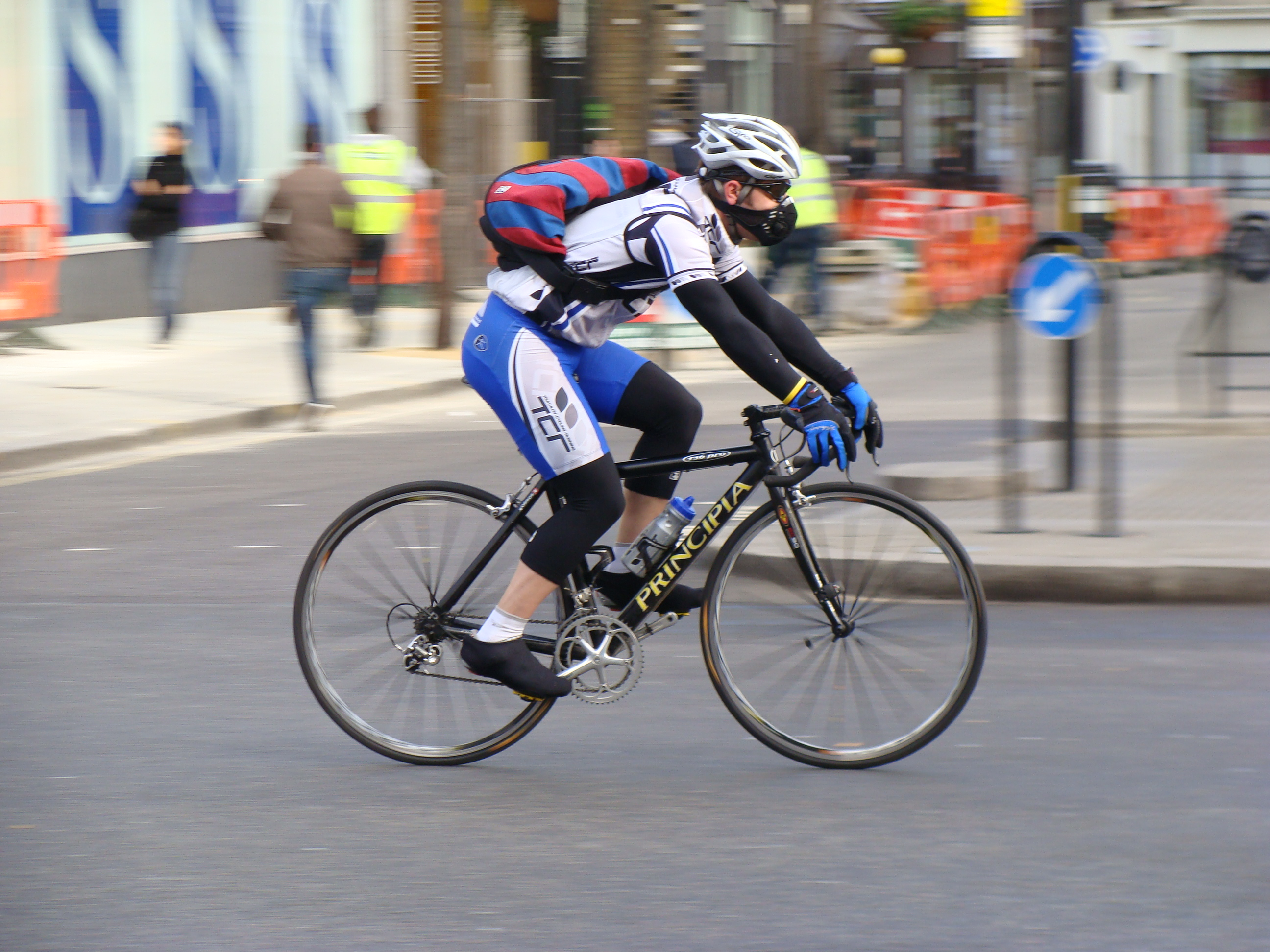
Heavily equipped London cyclist: specialist cycle clothing, pollution mask, dark glasses and helmet.

The physical exercise gained from cycling is generally linked with increased health and well-being. According to the World Health Organization (WHO), physical inactivity is second only to tobacco smoking as a health risk in developed countries, and is associated with 20–30% increased risk of various cancers, heart disease, and diabetes and tens of billions of dollars of healthcare costs. The WHO's 2009 report suggests that increasing physical activity is a public health "best buy", and that cycling is a "highly suitable activity" for this purpose. The charity Sustrans reports that investment in cycling provision can give a 20:1 return from health and other benefits. It has been estimated that, on average, approximately 20 life-years are gained from the health benefits of road bicycling for every life-year lost through injury.

Bicycles are often used by people seeking to improve their fitness and cardiovascular health. As a form of cardiovascular exercise, it also improves blood circulation and works many muscles in the body. Recent studies on the use of cycling for commutes have shown that it reduces the risk of cardiovascular outcomes by 11%, with slightly more risk reduction in women than in men. In addition, cycling is especially helpful for those with arthritis of the lower limbs who are unable to pursue sports that cause impact to the knees and other joints. Since cycling can be used for the practical purpose of transportation, there can be less need for self-discipline to exercise.

Cycling while seated is a relatively non-weight bearing exercise that, like swimming, does little to promote bone density. Cycling up and out of the saddle, on the other hand, does a better job by transferring more of the rider's body weight to the legs. However, excessive cycling while standing can cause knee damage It used to be thought that cycling while standing was less energy efficient, but recent research has proven this not to be true. Other than air resistance, there is no wasted energy from cycling while standing, if it is done correctly.

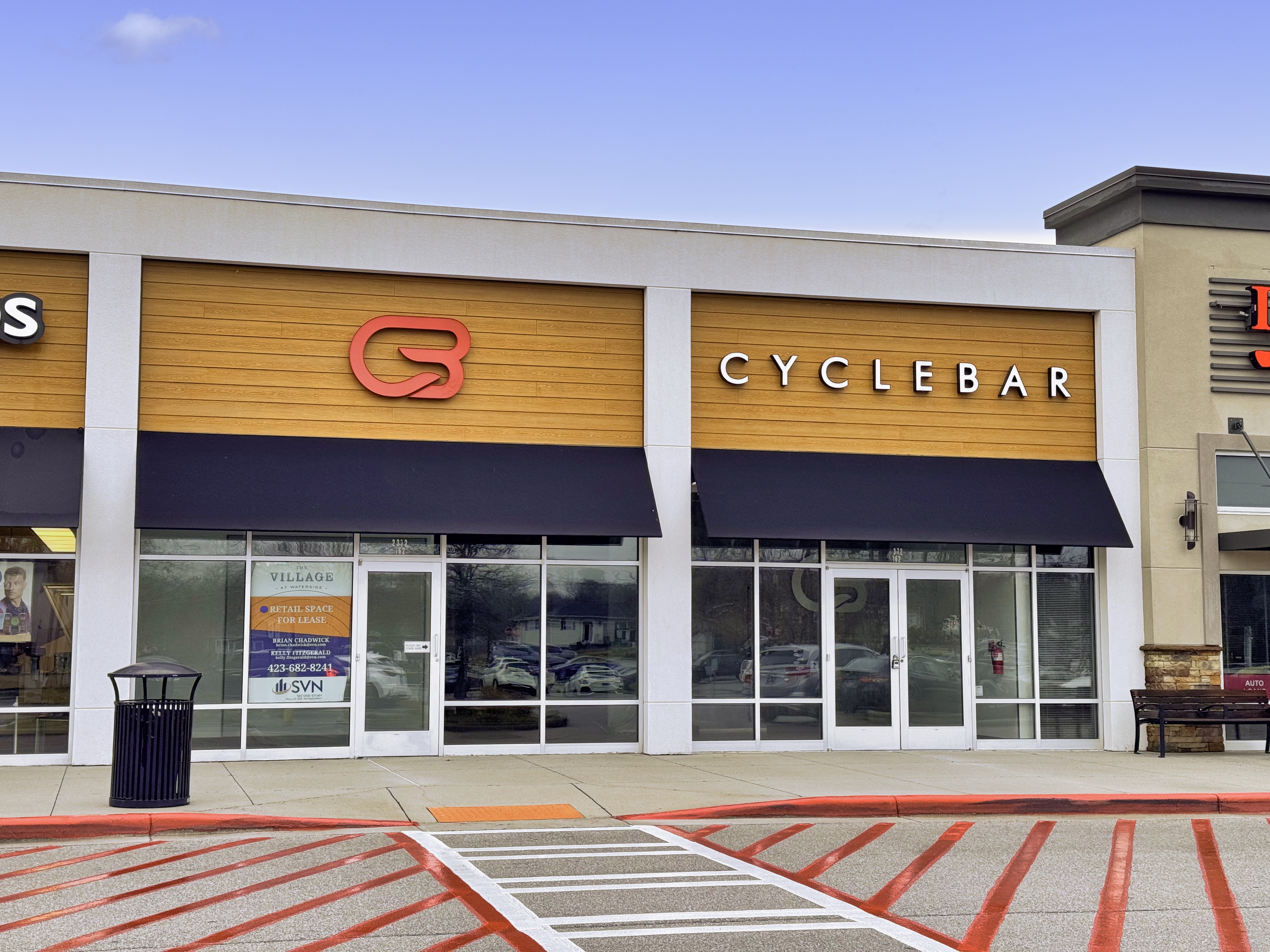
A CycleBar indoor cycling center in Chattanooga, Tennessee

Cycling on a stationary cycle is frequently advocated as a suitable exercise for rehabilitation, particularly for lower limb injury, owing to the low impact which it has on the joints. In particular, cycling is commonly used within knee rehabilitation programs, to strengthen the quadriceps muscles with minimal stress on the knee ligaments. Further stress of the knee can be relieved by changing seat heights and pedal position to improve the rehabilitation. Cycling is also used for rehabilitation after hip surgery to manage soft-tissue healing, control swelling and pain, and allow a larger range of motion to the nearby muscles earlier during recovery. As a result, many institutions have established a rehabilitation protocol that involves stationary cycling as part of the recovery process. One such protocol offered by Mayo Clinic recommends 2–4 weeks of cycling on an upright stationary bike following hip arthroscopy, starting from 5 minutes per session and slowly increasing to 30 minutes per session. The goal of these sessions are to reduce joint inflammation and maintain the widest range of motion possible with limited pain.

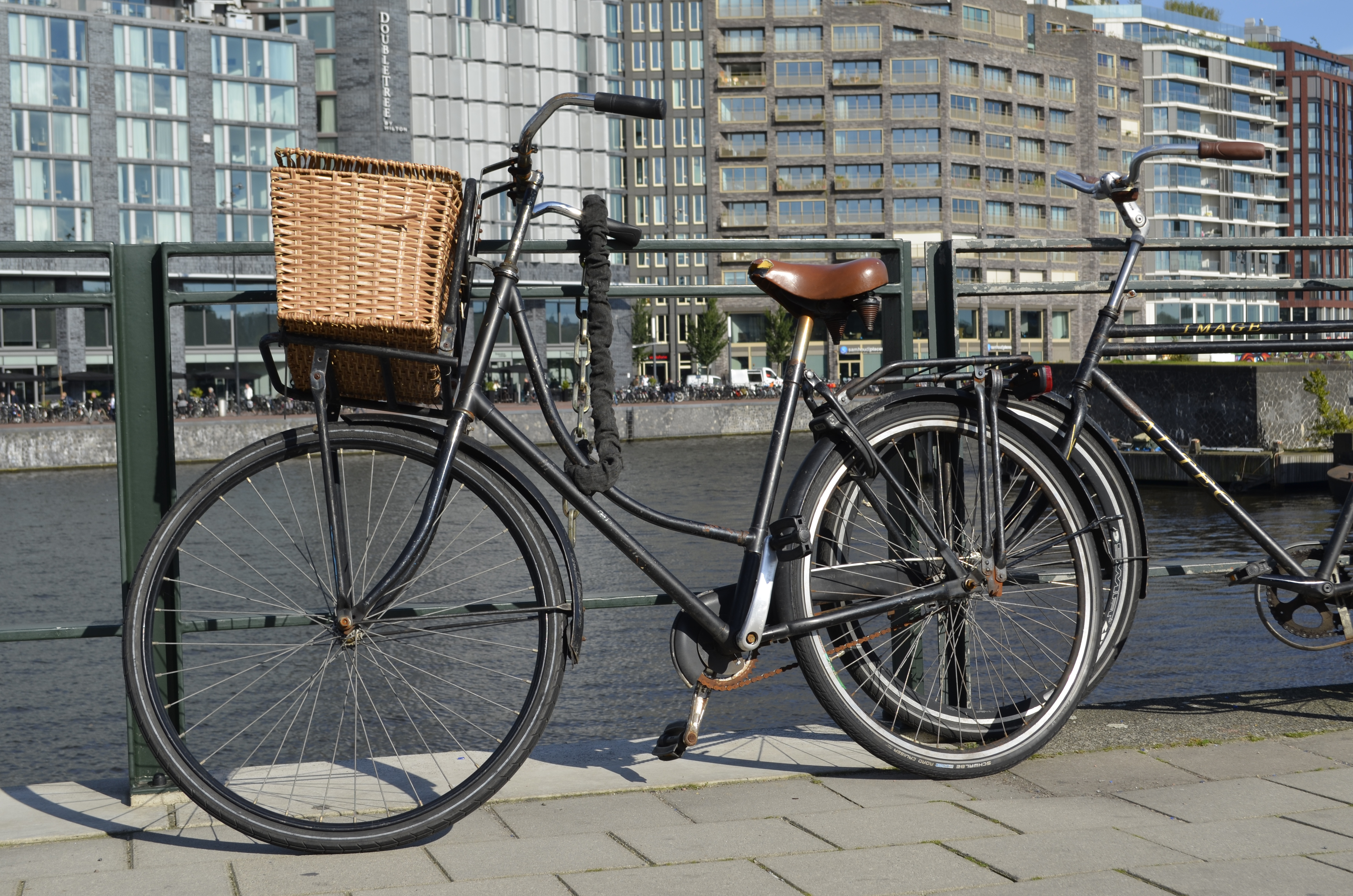
Bike at Prins Hendrikkade, Amsterdam

As a response to the increased global sedentary lifestyles and consequent overweight and obesity, one response that has been adopted by many organizations concerned with health and environment is the promotion of Active travel, which seeks to promote walking and cycling as safe and attractive alternatives to motorized transport. Given that many journeys are for relatively short distances, there is considerable scope to replace car use with walking or cycling, though in many settings this may require some infrastructure modification, particularly to attract the less experienced and confident.

An Italian study assessed the impact of cycling for commute on major non-communicable diseases and public healthcare costs. Using a health economic assessment model, the study found a lower incidence of type 2 diabetes, acute myocardial infarction, and stroke in individuals that cycled compared to those that did not actively commute. This model estimated that public healthcare costs would reduce by 5% over a 10-year period.

Illinois designated cycling as its official state exercise in 2007.

=== Mental health ===
The effects of cycling on overall mental health have often been studied. A European study surveying participants from seven cities about self-perceived health based on primary modes of transportation reported favorable results in the bicycle use population. The bicycle use group reported predominantly good self-perceived health, less perceived stress, better mental health, better vitality, and less loneliness. The study attributed these results to possible economic benefits and senses of both independence and identity as a member of a cyclist community. An English study recruiting non-cyclist older adults aged 50 to 83 to participate as either conventional pedal bike cyclists, electrically assisted e-bike cyclists, or a non-cyclist control group in outdoor trails measured cognitive function through executive function, spatial reasoning, and memory tests and well-being through questionnaires. The study did not find significant differences in spatial reasoning or memory tests. It did, however, find that both cyclists groups had improved executive function and well-being, both with greater improvement in the e-bike group. This suggested that non-physical factors of cycling such as independence, engagement with the outdoor environment, and mobility play a greater role in improving mental health.

A 15-month randomized controlled trial in the U.S. examined the impact of self-paced cycling on cognitive function in institutionalized older adults without cognitive impairment. Researchers used three cognitive assessments: Mini-Mental State Examination (MMSE), Fuld object memory evaluation, and symbol digit modality test. The study found that long-term cycling for at least 15 minutes per day in older adults without cognitive impairment had a protective effect on cognition and attention.

Cycling has also been shown to be effective adjunct therapy in certain mental health conditions.

== Bicycle safety ==
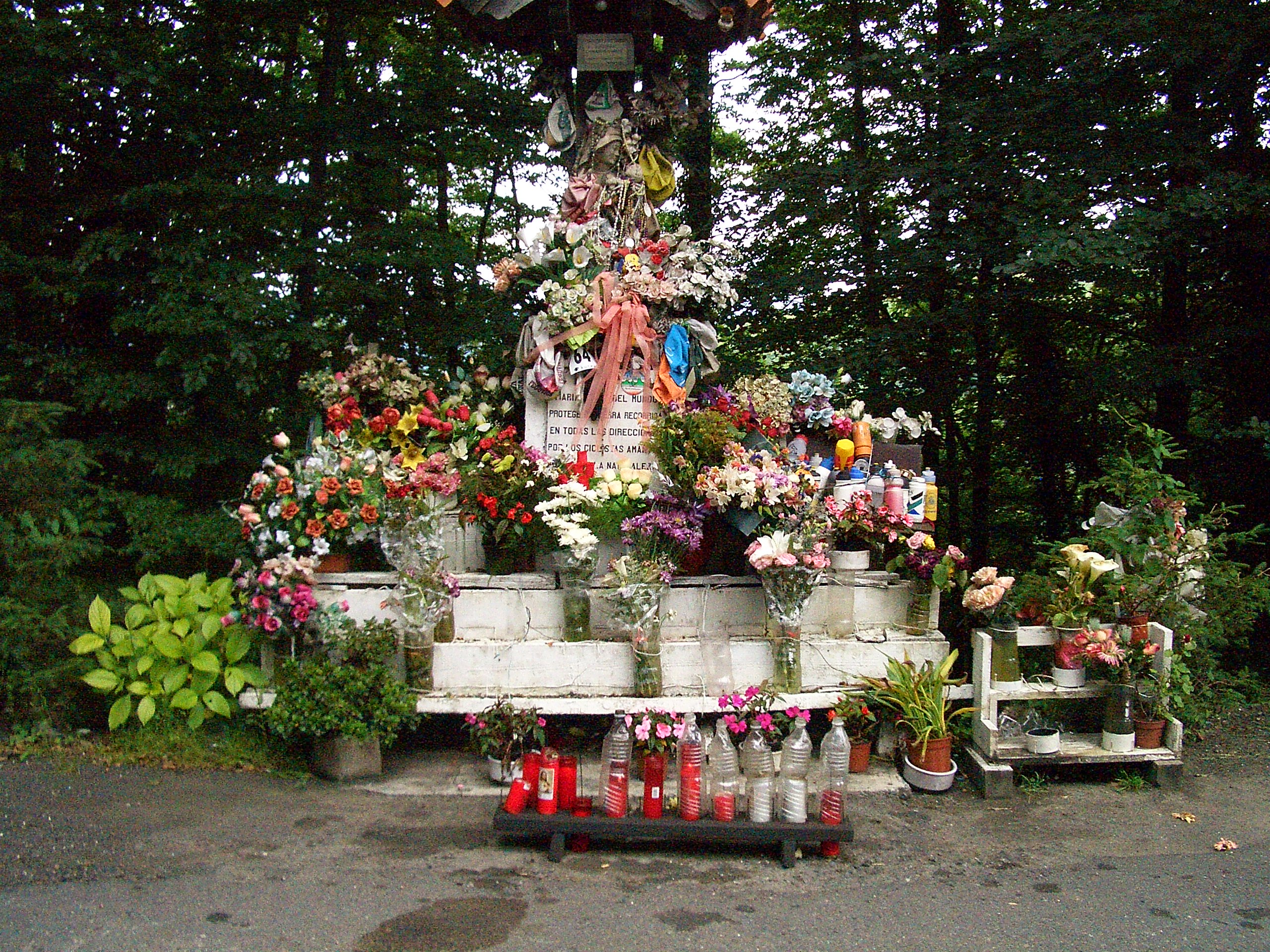
Virgin Mary venerated as the holy protector of cyclists on the roads of the mountainous Basque Country

Cycling suffers from a perception that it is unsafe. This perception is not always backed by hard numbers, because of under reporting of crashes and lack of bicycle use data (amount of cycling, kilometers cycled) which make it hard to assess the risk and monitor changes in risks. In the UK, fatality rates per mile or kilometre are slightly less than those for walking. In the US, bicycling fatality rates are less than 2/3 of those walking the same distance. However, in the UK for example the fatality and serious injury rates per hour of travel are just over double for cycling than those for walking.

Despite the risk factors associated with bicycling, cyclists have a lower overall mortality rate when compared to other groups. A Danish study in 2000 found that even after adjustment for other risk factors, including leisure time physical activity, those who did not cycle to work experienced a 39% higher mortality rate than those who did.

Injuries (to cyclists, from cycling) can be divided into two types:

- Physical trauma (extrinsic)
- Overuse (intrinsic)

=== Physical trauma ===
Acute physical trauma includes injuries to the head and extremities resulting from falls and collisions. Most cycle deaths result from a collision with a car or heavy goods vehicle. Drivers are at fault in the majority of these crashes. Segregated cycling infrastructure reduces the rate of crashes between bicycles and motor vehicles.

Although a majority of bicycle collisions occur during the day, bicycle lighting is recommended for bicycle safety when cycling at night to increase visibility.

When falling off a bike, a cyclist that instinctively tries to break their fall with an outstretched hand, can sustain a Fall Onto Out-Stretched Hand (FOOSH) injury, commonly resulting in wrist sprains and fractures.

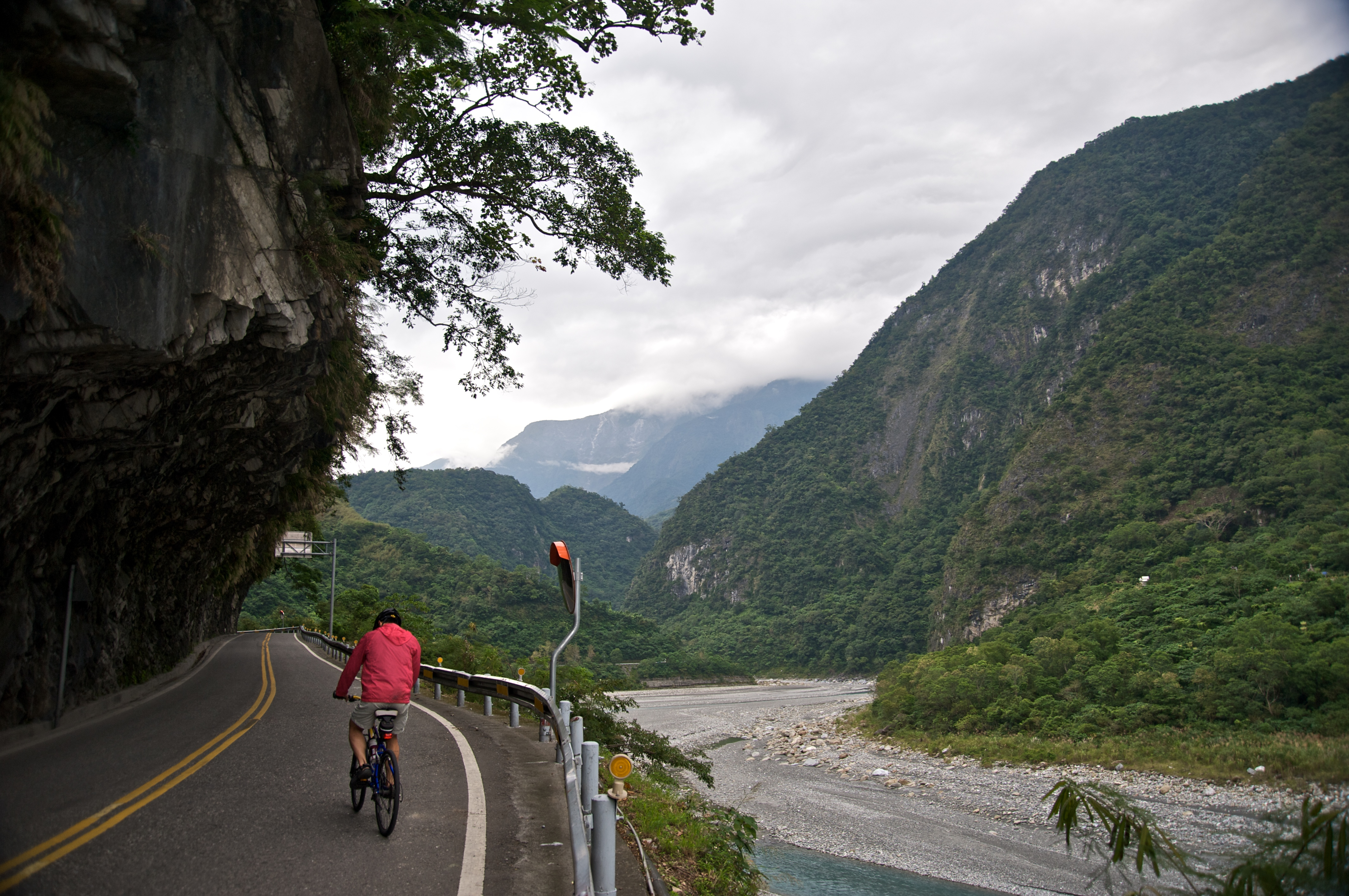
Bicyclist pedals uphill at the Taroko Gorge in Taiwan

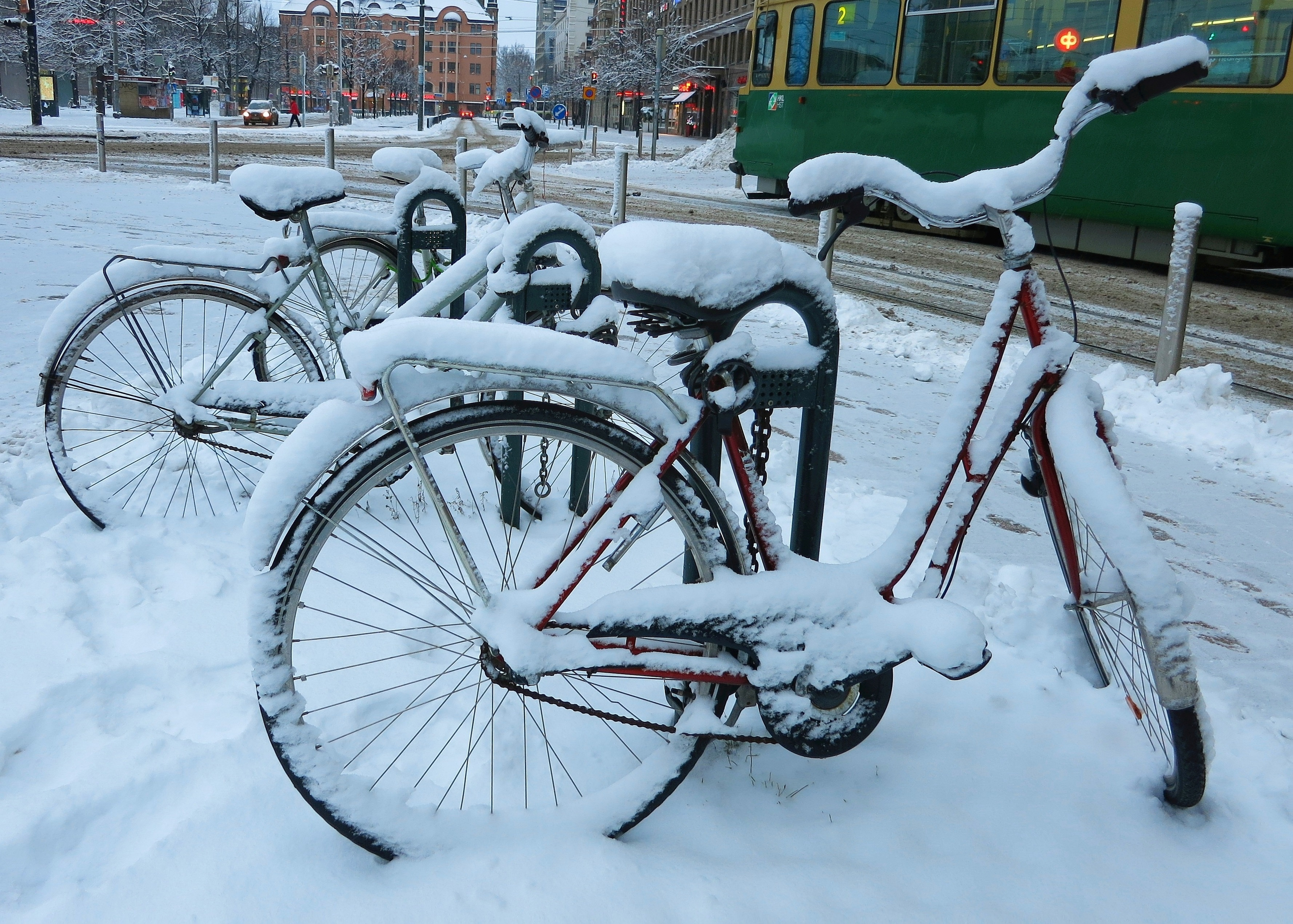
Bicycles in Helsinki (Finland)

=== Overuse injuries ===
Of a study of 518 cyclists, a large majority reported at least one overuse injury, with over one third requiring medical treatment. The most common injury sites were the neck (48.8%) and the knees (41.7%), as well as the groin/buttocks (36.1%), hands (31.1%), and back (30.3%). Women were more likely to suffer from neck and shoulder pain than men.

Many cyclists suffer from overuse injuries to the knees, affecting cyclists at all levels. These are caused by many factors:

- Incorrect bicycle fit or adjustment, particularly the saddle.
- Incorrect adjustment of clipless pedals.
- Too many hills, or too many miles, too early in the training season.
- Poor training preparation for long touring rides.
- Selecting too high a gear. A lower gear for uphill climb protects the knees, even though muscles may be well able to handle a higher gear.

Overuse injuries, including chronic nerve damage at weight bearing locations, can occur as a result of repeatedly riding a bicycle for extended periods of time. Damage to the ulnar nerve in the palm, carpal tunnel in the wrist, the genitourinary tract or bicycle seat neuropathy may result from overuse. Recumbent bicycles are designed on different ergonomic principles and eliminate pressure from the saddle and handlebars, due to the relaxed riding position.

Note that overuse is a relative term, and capacity varies greatly between individuals. Someone starting out in cycling must be careful to increase length and frequency of cycling sessions slowly, starting for example at an hour or two per day, or a hundred miles or kilometers per week. Bilateral muscular pain is a normal by-product of the training process, whereas unilateral pain may reveal "exercise-induced arterial endofibrosis". Joint pain and numbness are also early signs of overuse injury.

A Spanish study of top triathletes found those who cover more than 186 miles (300 km) a week on their bikes have less than 4% normal looking sperm, where normal adult males would be expected to have from 15% to 20%.

=== Saddle related ===
Much work has been done to investigate optimal bicycle saddle shape, size and position, and negative effects of extended use of less than optimal seats or configurations.

Excessive saddle height can cause posterior knee pain, while setting the saddle too low can cause pain in the anterior of the knee. An incorrectly fitted saddle may eventually lead to muscle imbalance. A 25 to 35-degree knee angle is recommended to avoid an overuse injury.

Although cycling is beneficial to health, men can be negatively affected by cycling more than three hours a week due to the significant weight on their perineum, an area located between the scrotum and the anus which hold some of the nerves and arteries that pass to the penis. This weight for continuous hours a week can cause men to experience numbness or tingling which can lead to them losing the ability to achieve an erection due to reduced blood flow; which 13% of males did experience in a study by Norwegian researchers who gathered data from 160 men participating in a long-distance bike tour. Fitting a proper sized seat can prevent this effect. In extreme cases, pudendal nerve entrapment can be a source of intractable perineal pain. Some cyclists with induced pudendal nerve pressure neuropathy gained relief from improvements in saddle position and riding techniques.

The National Institute for Occupational Safety and Health (NIOSH) has investigated the potential health effects of prolonged bicycling in police bicycle patrol units, including the possibility that some bicycle saddles exert excessive pressure on the urogenital area of cyclists, restricting blood flow to the genitals. Their study found that using bicycle seats without protruding noses reduced pressure on the groin by at least 65% and significantly reduced the number of cases of urogenital paresthesia. A follow-up found that 90% of bicycle officers who tried the no-nose seat were using it six months later. NIOSH recommends that riders use a no-nose bicycle seat for workplace bicycling.

Despite rumors to the contrary, there is no scientific evidence linking cycling with testicular cancer.

=== Exposure to air pollution ===
One concern is that riding in traffic may expose the cyclist to higher levels of air pollution, especially cyclists regularly traveling on or along busy roads. Some authors have claimed this to be untrue, showing that the pollutant and irritant count within cars is consistently higher, presumably because of limited circulation of air within the car and due to the air intake being directly in the stream of other traffic. Other authors have found small or inconsistent differences in concentrations but claim that exposure of cyclists is higher due to increased minute ventilation and is associated with minor biological changes. A 2010 study estimated that the gained life expectancy from the health benefits of cycling (approximately 3–14 months gained) greatly exceeded the lost life expectancy from air pollution (approximately 0.8–40 days lost). However, a systematic review comparing the effects of air pollution exposure on the health of cyclists was conducted, but the authors concluded that the differing methodologies and measuring parameters of each study made it difficult to compare results and suggested a more holistic approach was needed to accomplish this. The significance of the associated health effect, if any, is unclear but probably much smaller than the health impacts associated with accidents and the health benefits derived from additional physical activity.

== Environmental impact ==
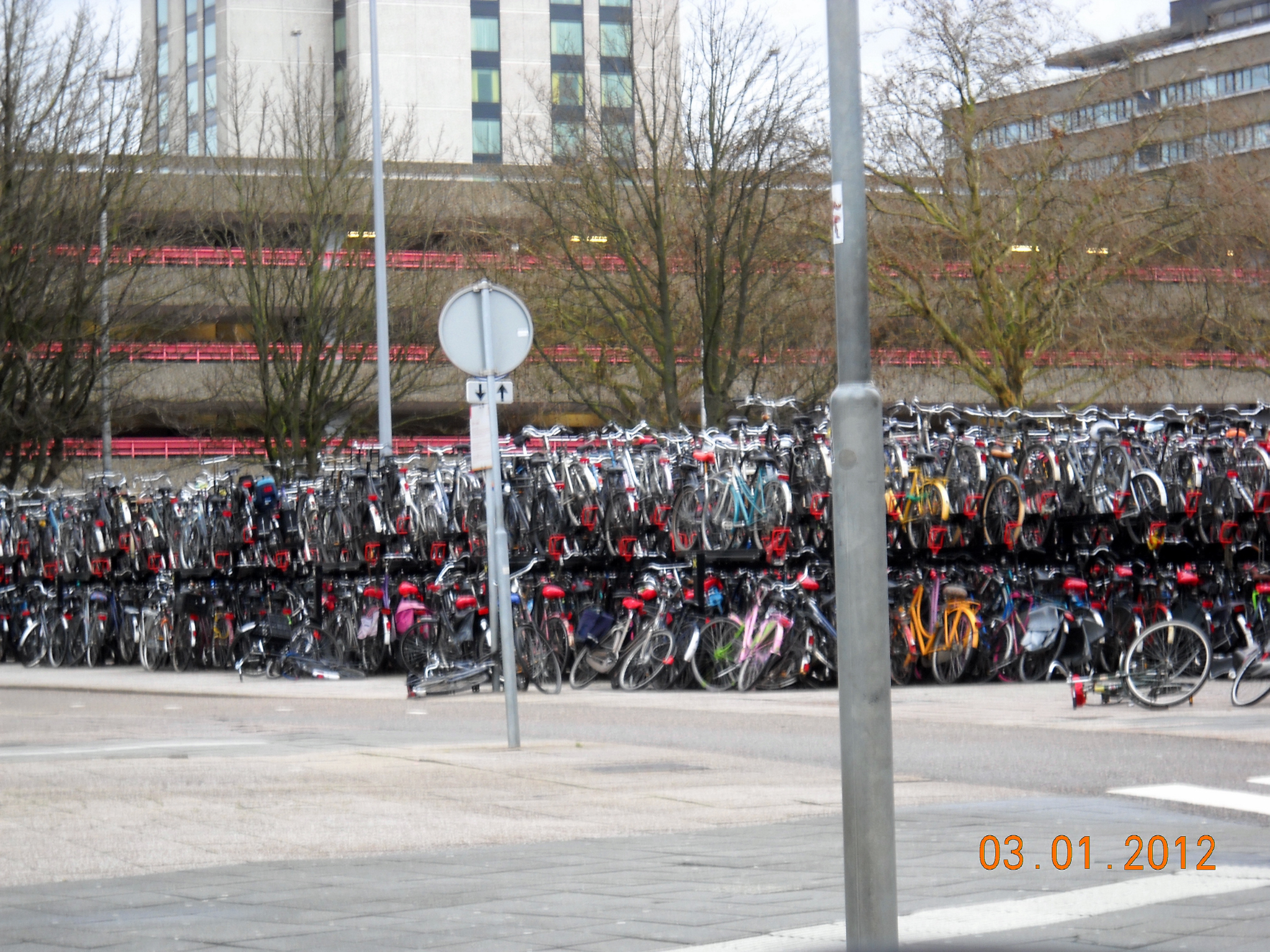
Bicycles in Utrecht, Netherlands

One of the profound economic implications of cycling is that it liberates the users from motor fuel consumption. (Ballantine, 1972) The bicycle is an inexpensive, fast, healthy and environmentally friendly mode of transport. Ivan Illich stated that bicycle use extended the usable physical environment for people, while alternatives such as cars and motorways degraded and confined people's environment and mobility.

Riding a bicycle is a very low carbon-intense form of travel with average emissions of 17 g CO₂e/km. This can be reduced further with electric power-assist if green electricity is used with lower emissions than for the food then not used, and the difference also compensates the production of the extra electrical components. According to figures from a 2011 ECF-publication, updated with respect to electrical energy required, over their full life-cycle electric bicycles on average emit 15 g CO₂e/km, including 7 g for manufacturing, 2 g for electric energy production and 6 g for food production.

Whether riding a purely human-powered or an electric bicycle results in fewer emissions depends on the type of food eaten or the type of electricity used. For example, a rider with access to climate-neutral food and electricity might emit as little as 7 g CO₂e/km, whereas one eating beef might cause emissions of 570 g CO₂e/km if other things remain equal.

== See also ==
- Anti-cycling sentiment
- Bicycle culture
- Cyclability
- Cycle sport
- Cycling advocacy
- Cycling in the Netherlands
- Cycling mobility
- Fancy Women Bike Ride
- History of cycling
- List of bicycle-sharing systems
- List of films about bicycles and cycling
- Masters cycling
- Right to mobility
- Outline of bicycles
