= Standing cycling =

Cycling method

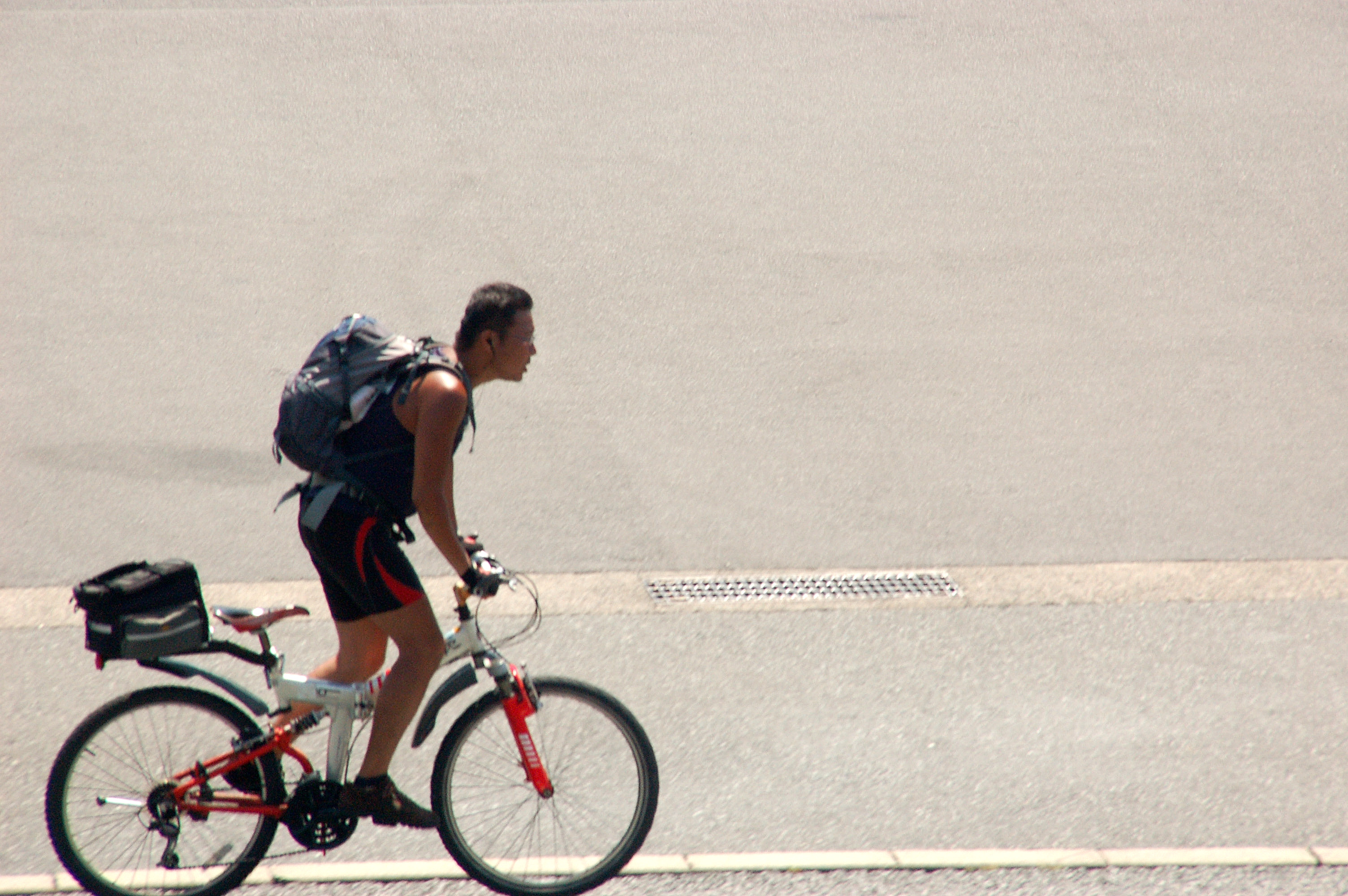
Japanese cyclist standing up

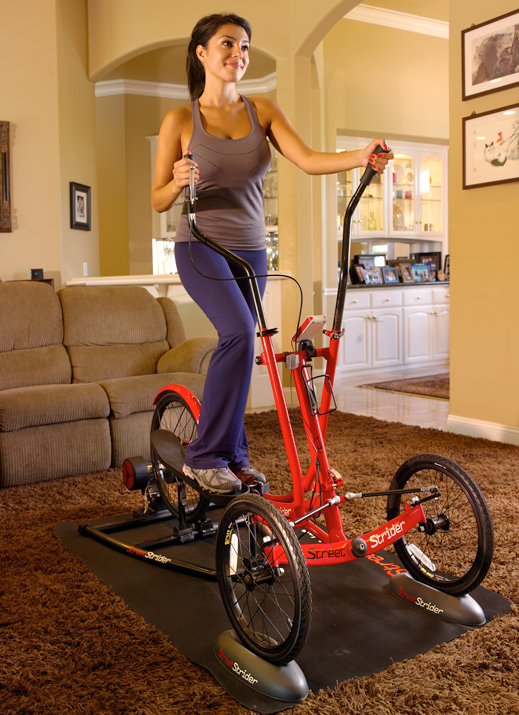
Elliptical bike with no seat

Standing cycling or cycling out of the saddle is a form of cycling in which the rider stands up while applying force to the pedals.

== Muscle activation ==
One reason for cycling standing up is to vary the muscles used and avoid fatigue.

== Efficiency and power output ==
Standing cycling is less efficient especially at lower intensities. One study found that both positions have equal time to exhaustion at 86 V̇O_{2} max, while standing up had higher time to exhaustion above 94 percent V̇O₂ max. A 2018 study in elite male cyclists found that standing did not affect energy cost but increased mechanical cost including rolling resistance power, rolling resistance coefficient, and lateral sway, resulting in an overall 4.3 percent increase in power needed to maintain the same speed. A 2017 study found that people spontaneously stand up when cycling to minimize muscular effort.

Cycling standing up allows for greater power output in the short run because of the application of body weight to forward motion.

People whose bodies are lighter have lower efficiency costs from standing up, so lighter professional riders such as Alberto Contador are more often seen standing up.

== Type of bike used ==
Shorter crank lengths are more efficient with standing cycling compared to seated. Some bicycles are designed to be ridden standing up the entire time.
