= Marching and Cycling Band HHK =

Dutch band

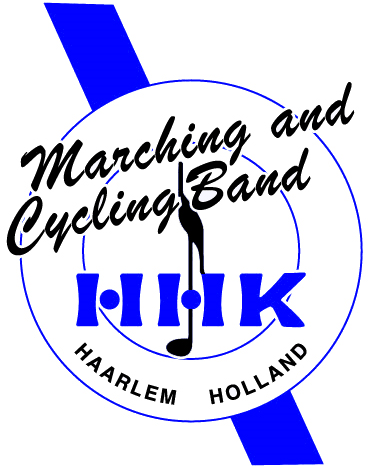
The MaC-Band HHK logo

The Marching and Cycling Band HHK was a marching band from Haarlem, The Netherlands which existed from 1964 until 2014, started by a fusion in 1964 of two ancestor bands: Kunstkring Apollo and Harmonie Crescendo under the name of Haarlems Harmonie Kapel (HHK). The band had a unique way of performing: marching and cycling, hence the name "Marching and Cycling Band HHK".

The MaC-Band was a band that played music from the pop, musical and film worlds. They exercised weekly.

== The band ==
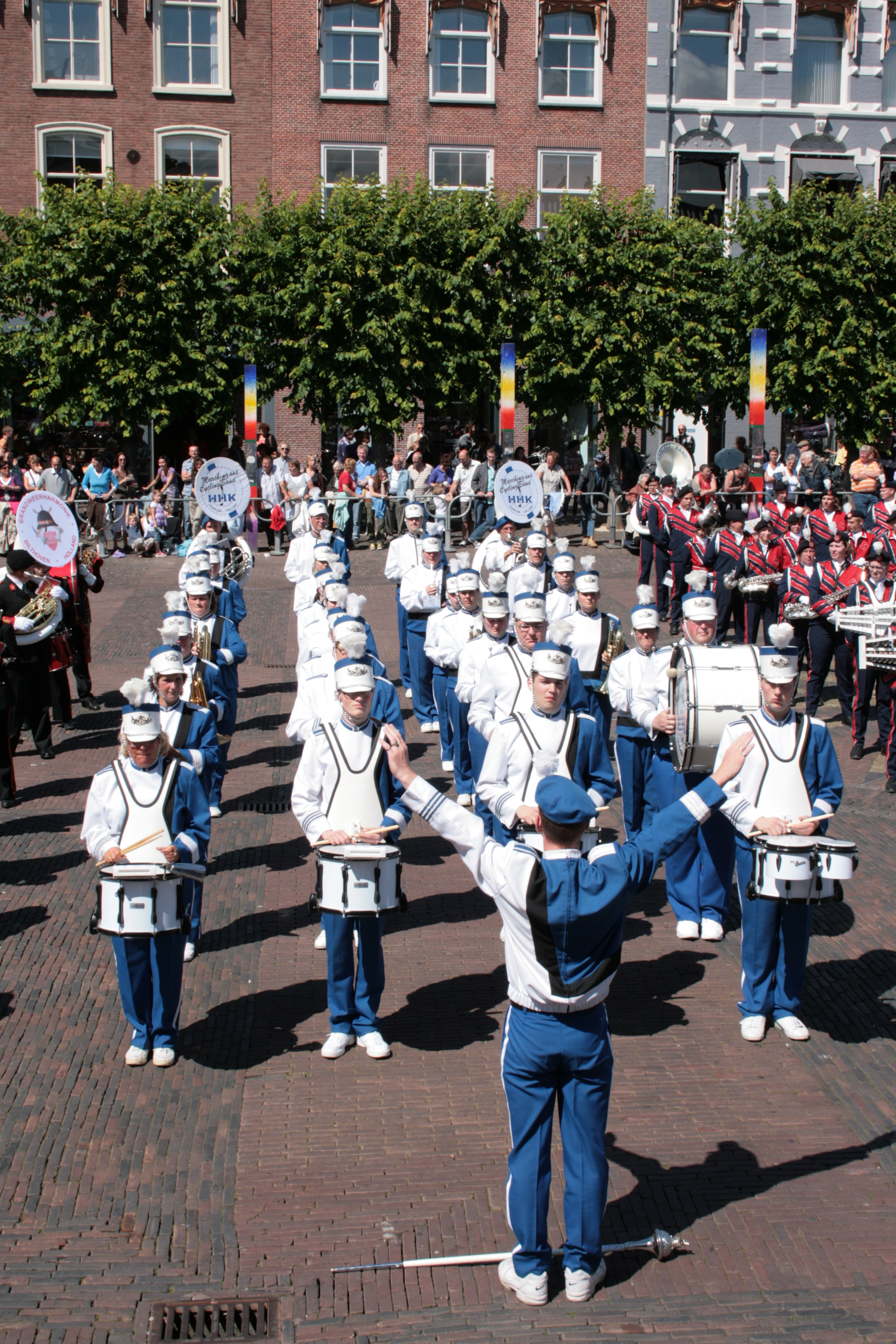
Line up during a performance

On average the band had between 20 and 25 performances a year, mostly in the periods April – June and September – October. Most performances were cycling, but marching performances were also executed.

During the winter season there were a few performances and therefore the repertoire was (partially) updated. Also, the music for the marching show of the new season was studied.

From 1995 until 2014, in the beginning of the season a so-called training weekend for the whole association was organised, in addition to practicing for the show that season in a different way.

As of 2009 the band has its own YouTube channel named MaCBandHHK where videos of the performances and other activities are published.

== Performing on a bicycle ==
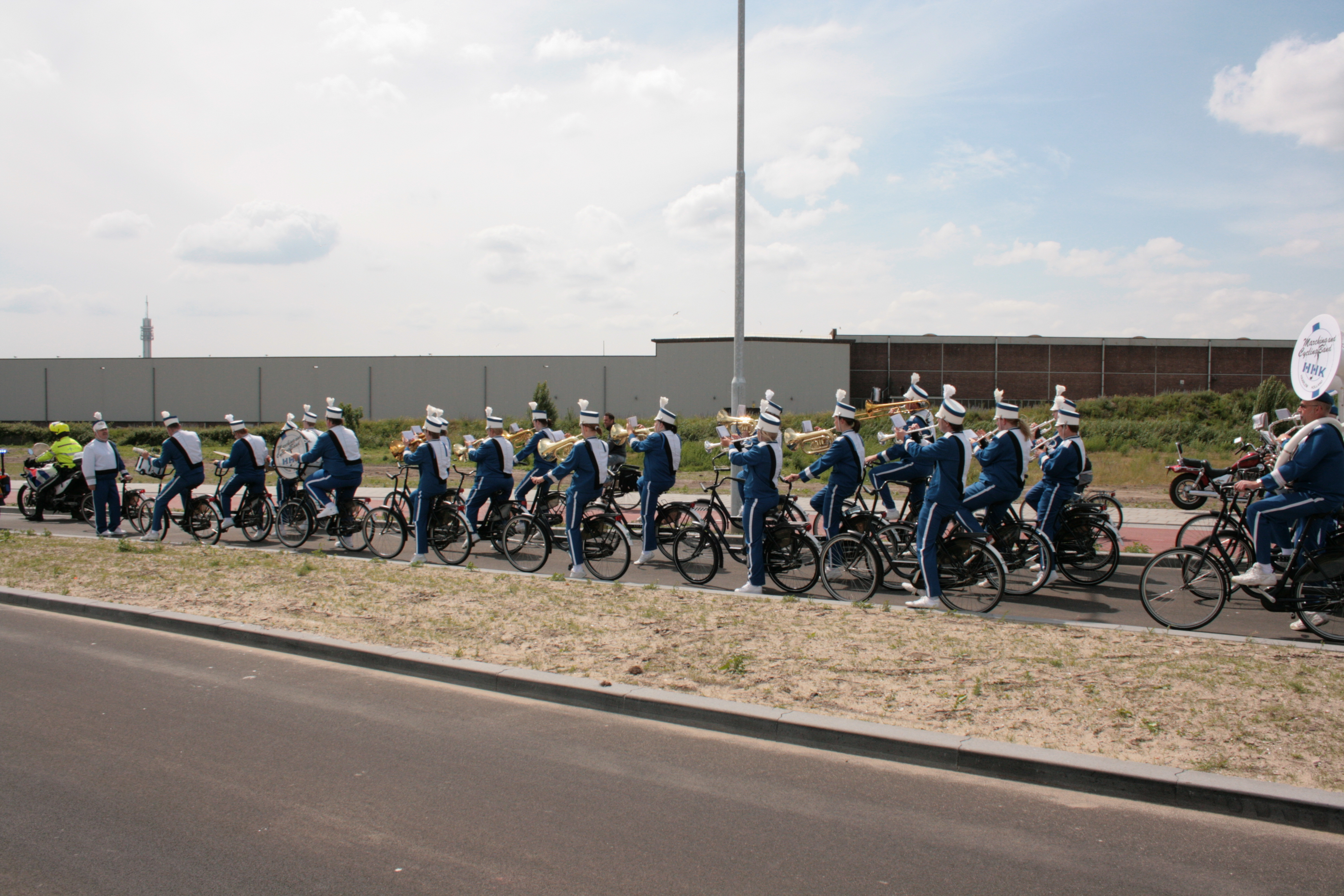
Performing in Haarlem on the bicycle

In 1973 a member of the board, Bram Visser, got the idea to start performing with the marching band on bicycles, just like Dutch military bands had done years before. The first performance of this now well known band took place at the Grote Markt (central market square) during the March of Musicians of 1973. A yearly event that in those days took place in September in the evening. The performance was done on own and borrowed bicycles.

After some hesitation by the rest of the board and due to the enormous success of the performance it was decided to buy 41 bicycles. The bicycle platoon existed for 41 years.

Through this way of making music the band gained fame in the Netherlands and abroad. Since those days the band was requested for many sorts of performances, from serenades to carnaval parades and international musical festivals. Often the band could be found in France, Belgium, Germany and The Netherlands, and also executed performances in England, Switzerland, Sweden and Luxembourg.

== History ==
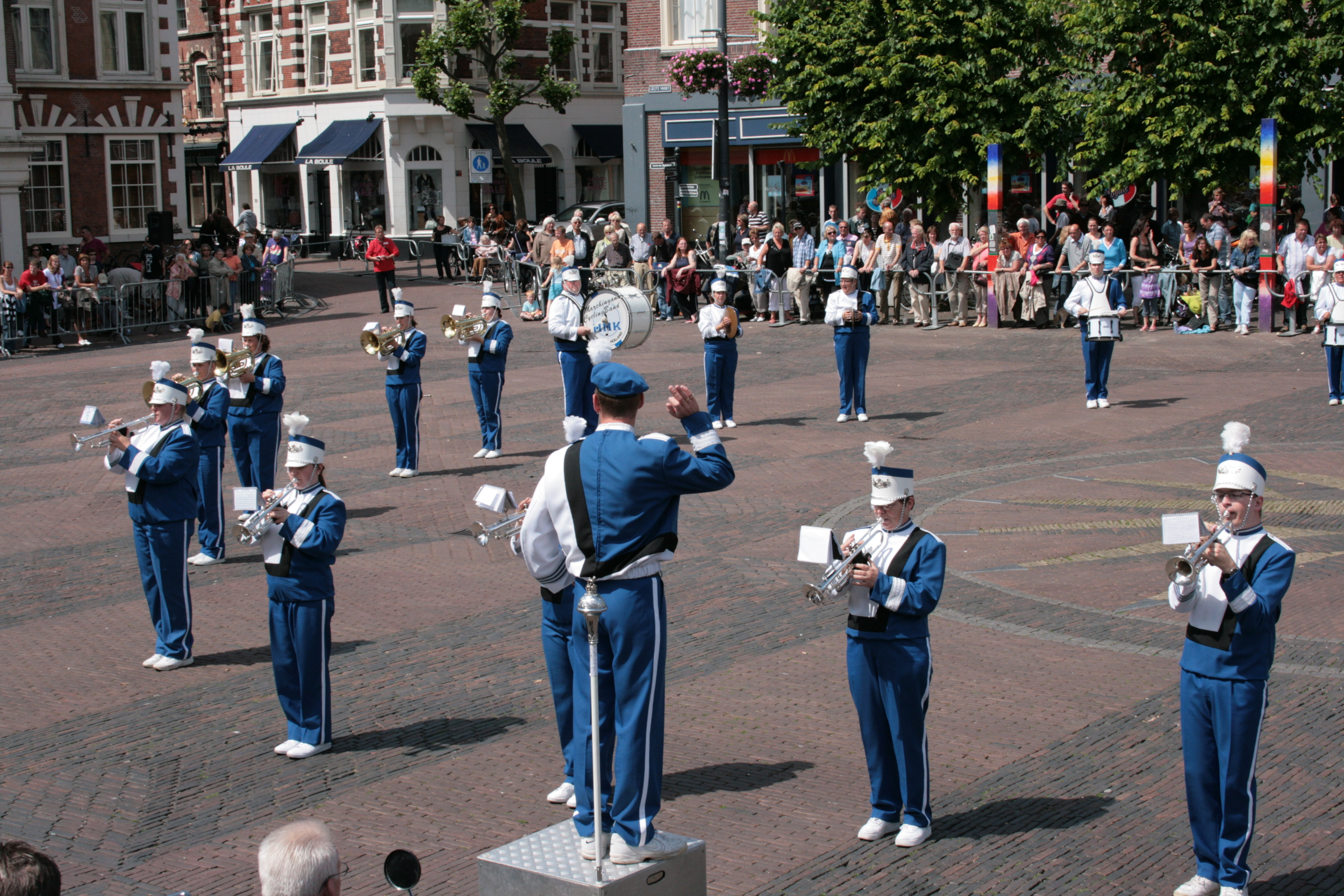
Performing at the Grote Markt in Haarlem

The HHK was founded in 1964 existing of a harmony orchestra, a marching band and a majorettes squad. At the end of the 1960s it was one of the largest music associations in Europe, with more than 200 members. The drum band started with natural instruments in the key of E-flat and percussion. The music was played on french horns, trumpets and sousaphones. The percussion consists of so-called march and / or snare drums, tenor drums and bass drums.

The harmony orchestra was a complete orchestra, including clarinets, trombones, trumpets and[french horns. Each year the association gave a concert in the Concert Hall of Haarlem. Most of the evening was filled with music played by the harmony, but the drum band and the majorettes also gave a performance. Usually, the evening ended with a joint work, played by the harmony and drum band together.

In October 2010, a youth department started, named Music-Kids, and in 2012 the visual group with majorettes and twirls was extended with a colorguard group.

== Special appearances ==
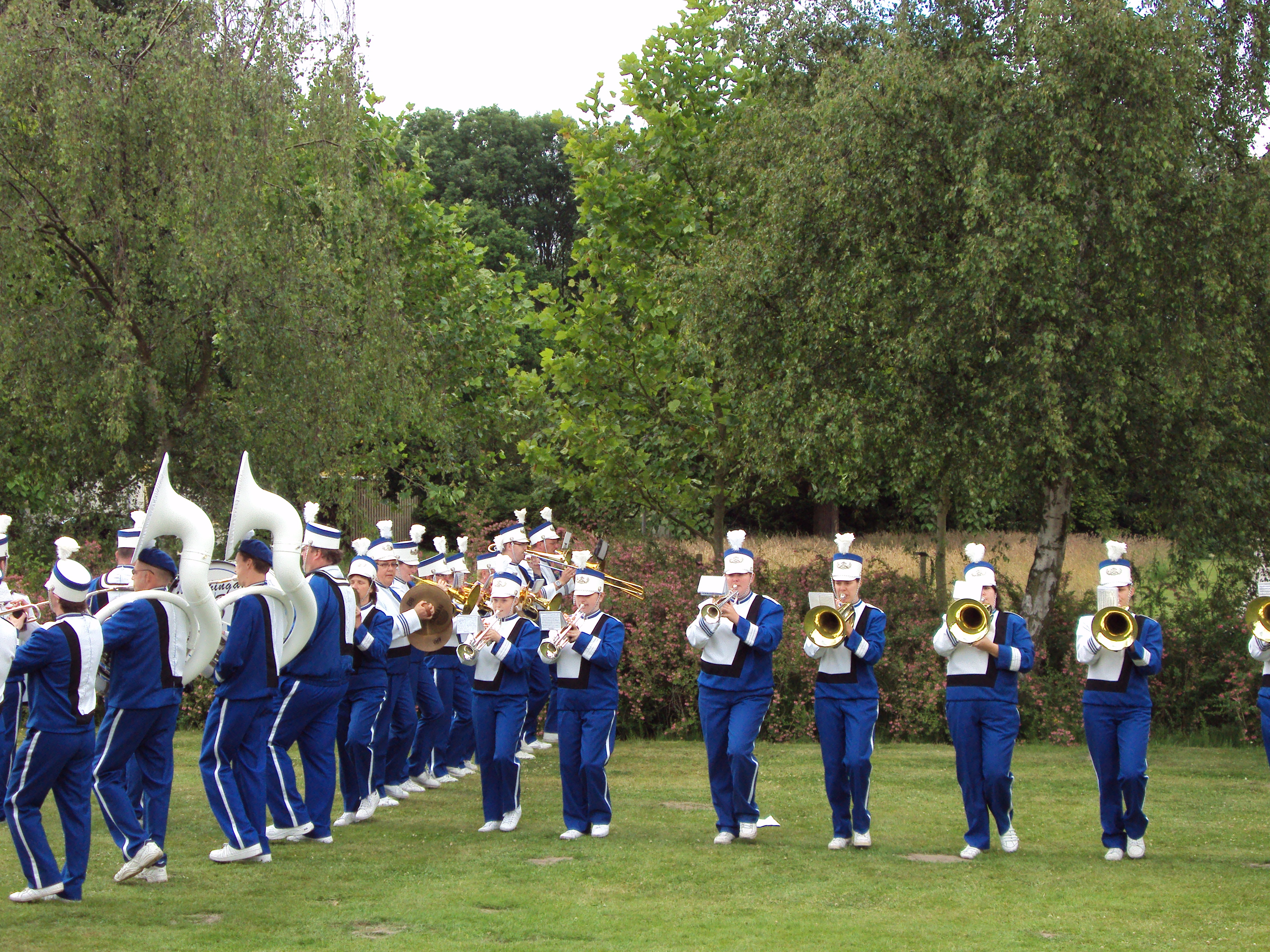
Performing during the Cruquiusfestival 2009

During the existence of the Marching and Cycling Band HHK there a number of specific actions were performed, including:

- 2014: Short occurrence in the Dutch movie Pak van mijn Hart (recorded in 2013)
- 2012: Participated in the RTL 4 sketch comedy 'Wat als?' (What If?)
- 2010: A special liberation item during Tattoo Delft
- 2010: Opening of the Tour de France in Rotterdam
- 2007: Opening of the European Championship of wheelchair basketball in Wetzlar, Germany
- 2004: 40-year anniversary with a performance on the water cycles during the Haarlem Sailing Days
- 2003: Opening of the A5 motorway (Netherlands) (on the bicycle)
- 2002: Presentation of the new uniforms during the March of the Musicians
- 2001: First prize won by sending a report for the program Malende zaken of TV Noord-Holland
- 1998: The RTL 4-program Ga Toch Fietsen ("Go cycling") broadcast a report about the performance of the Marching and Cycling Band HHK during the Flower Parade on Saturday April 25.
- 1994: Opening of the Tour de France in Lille
- 1991: TV commercial for the Dutch National Trust
- 1989: Guest performance on the French television show Dimanche Martin
