= Street Riders NYC =

U.S. activists

- Part of Black Lives Matter, George Floyd protests
- Date: Formed in June 2020
- Location: New York City
- Caused by: Justice for George Floyd; Justice for Breonna Taylor; Justice for Ahmaud Arbery; Criminal justice reform in the United States; Police brutality in the United States; Racism against people of color in America including immigrants

Eight minutes and 46 seconds of silence for George Floyd at Battery Park during a protest led by Street Riders NYC on June 20, 2020

Street Riders NYC was a collective that formed in June 2020 during the period of civil unrest following the murder of George Floyd. The group emerged in part from an effort by cyclists to help shield demonstrators from arrest. It was founded by Orlando Hamilton and Peter Kerre. The group at one point saw thousands attending weekly protests throughout the city seeking to raise awareness about systemic racism and police brutality. Made up entirely of volunteers, the group has their own medics, mechanics, and traffic blockers available for assistance on the ride.
