= Brian Cookson =

English racing cyclist and cycling executive

Brian Cookson OBE
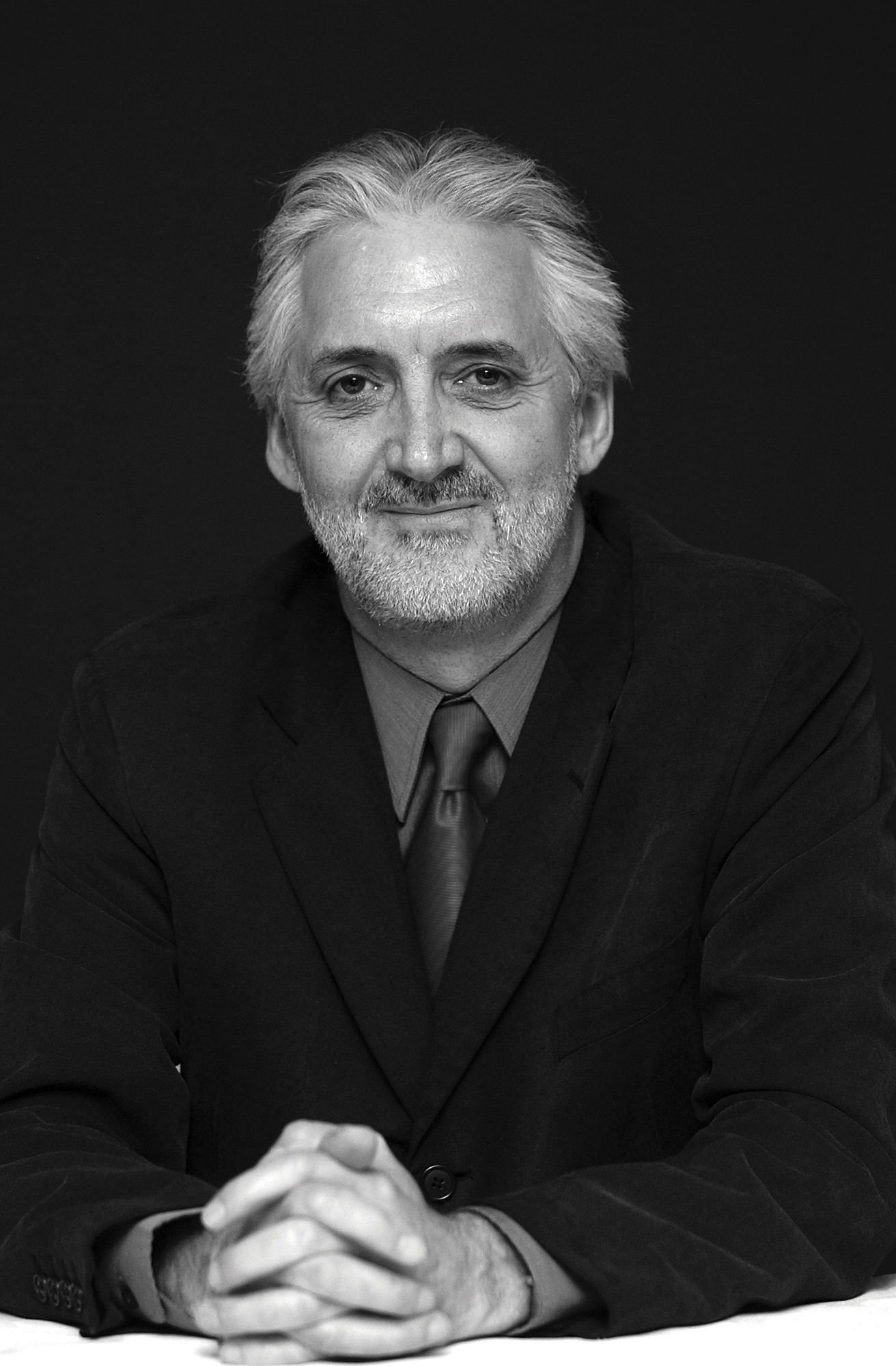
- Brian Cookson OBE
- Born: 22 June 1951 (age 74); Lancashire, England
- Spouse: Sian Cookson
- Children: 3
- Website: briancookson.com

Michael Brian Cookson OBE (born 22 June 1951) is the former president of the Union Cycliste Internationale (UCI), having been elected to the post in September 2013 at the 2013 UCI Road World Championships.

Cookson previously served as president of British Cycling from 1997 to 2013, after becoming a member of an emergency committee to rescue it from insolvency in 1996. He has been credited with turning the sport around since taking on his unpaid role as president and under his presidency, British cyclists have won 19 Olympic gold medals, 28 Paralympic Gold medals, the Tour de France five times, and multiple World Championship titles in disciplines of Road, Track and BMX.

== Personal life ==
Graduating in 1973, Cookson retired in March 2013 from his mainstream career, where he was employed by Pendle Borough Council as executive director (Regeneration) having gained wide experience in strategic management of multi-facetted organisations, and of managing teams of staff engaged in major programmes of urban regeneration and renewal.

Cookson is married to Sian, has three children and lives in the Ribble Valley, Lancashire.

== Administration career ==
Administratively, Cookson has held the following offices; Division Road Race Secretary, 1981–5; Division Vice Chairman 1984–7; Division Chairman 1993–7; BCF Racing and Executive Committees 1984–93; BCF Executive Committee/Board 1996–present. He has represented cycling at the British Olympic Association since 1996.

Cookson qualified as a UCI International Commissaire (i.e. judge/referee) in 1986, working on events such as the Tour of Britain, the Milk Race, the Warsaw-Berlin-Prague Peace Race and stage races in Australia, South Africa, Germany, Spain, France. Brian has also been involved in World Championships in France, Great Britain, Switzerland, and the Barcelona Olympic Games.

Internationally, he was elected to the UCI Management Committee in 2009, and was appointed as President of the UCI Cyclo-Cross Commission from 2009 to 2011, then President of the UCI Road Commission from 2011 to present.

Cookson made a statement following the doping scandals of the 2007 Tour de France, urging the organisers not to give up the fight for a clean sport.

Cookson announced on 4 June 2013 that he would be running for election as President of the Union Cycliste Internationale (UCI) – the international federation for the sport of cycling. Cookson was elected at the annual Congress in Florence, Italy, on 27 September 2013.

In 2017, Cookson ran for reelection as UCI president, however he was beaten by president of the European Cycling Union David Lappartient 45 votes to 8.

== Involvement in the sport of cycling ==
As a competitor, Cookson competed in road racing, track, cyclo-cross and MTB. The high point of his competitive career was winning the Lakeland Division Road Race championship in 1971.

More recently he has completed a number of sportive events, including l'Etape du Tour, the Fred Whitton Challenge and the Ride with Brad. He completed the Pyrenees Coast to Coast ride in 2011, and competed in the National Masters Track and Road Championships in 2012.

As an official, Cookson has organised or chaired the organising committee of events continuously since 1969, from club level to Premier Calendar. In 2010, for example, he chaired the Pendle Cycle Fest, which included the National Road Championships, the Colne GP circuit race, the Pendle Pedal sportive, and a summer-long programme of Sky Local rides for families.

== Honours ==
Cookson was appointed Officer of the Order of the British Empire (OBE) in the 2008 New Year Honours for services to sport, and was made an Honorary Fellow of the University of Central Lancashire in 2009.

He was elected a member of the British Olympic Association's executive committee for a third term in October 2005, and again re-elected in November 2007.
