= Étape =

An étape or etape generally refers to a stage or leg of some sort, often in the context of cycling. Étape may also refer to:

- Etape du Dales, a cyclosportive event
- L'Étape du Tour, a cyclosportive event
