= James MacDonald (cyclist) =

Scottish cyclist (born 1970)

James MacDonald (born 1970) is a Scottish ultra-endurance cyclist.

In August 2026, he announced an attempt to establish a World UltraCycling Association record by riding the routes of cycling's five Monument classics continuously.

== Early life and career ==
MacDonald grew up in Scotland and joined the Edinburgh-based Dunedin Cycling Club as a teenager, where he competed in short-distance time trials and handicap road races. He stopped racing during university and later worked as a systems engineer at Cisco Systems and Google.

He returned to cycling at 35, initially riding sportives, including the Marmotte in the French Alps and three consecutive editions of the Deloitte Ride Across Britain, a 980-mile multi-day event between Land's End and John o' Groats.

== Cycling career ==
=== Road ultra-distance riding ===
In 2016, MacDonald entered the Race Across America (RAAM), a non-stop transcontinental race from Oceanside, California, to Annapolis, Maryland. He completed the 3,089-mile course in 11 days and 19 hours on his first attempt. He finished 8th overall and became the only Scottish solo finisher of the race. He set out from John o' Groats on September 4, 2017, to break the record for the fastest solo return ride to Land's End and back, known as "JOGLEJOG." Riding a BMC Trackmachine with support from a team codenamed "Project Kansas," MacDonald completed the 2,711 km route in 5 days, 18 hours, and 3 minutes. His ride was ratified as a Guinness World Record and remained the outright all-comers' record until May 2025.

MacDonald rode 625 km from the Mull of Galloway lighthouse to John o' Groats on September 17–18, 2025. The ride was ratified by the World UltraCycling Association and Guinness World Records as the fastest south-to-north crossing of Scotland on a non-fixed-gear bicycle.

=== Indoor velodrome records ===
In June 2019, MacDonald attempted to break the world record for the greatest distance ridden on an indoor track in 24 hours, then held by Austrian ultra-cyclist Christoph Strasser at 941.873 km. The attempt took place at the Geraint Thomas National Velodrome of Wales in Newport. After skidding on spilled water and crashing, he continued for six hours before abandoning the attempt. A second attempt planned for 2020 was delayed by the COVID-19 pandemic and by MacDonald contracting the virus twice. He returned to Newport on May 20–21, 2023, setting World UltraCycling Association 50–59 age-group records for the 500 km and 300-mile indoor track distances.

MacDonald set a world record for the fastest 100 km ridden on an indoor track on September 9, 2021, completing the distance in 2 hours, 19 minutes, and 19 seconds. When he attempted to break the 100-mile indoor track world record at Lee Valley VeloPark on February 21, 2024, he suffered a stomach illness. He abandoned the attempt at about 90 miles, having also been informed by velodrome staff that the track was needed for a subsequent session.
