= Jennifer George (cyclist) =

Scottish cyclist (born 1983)

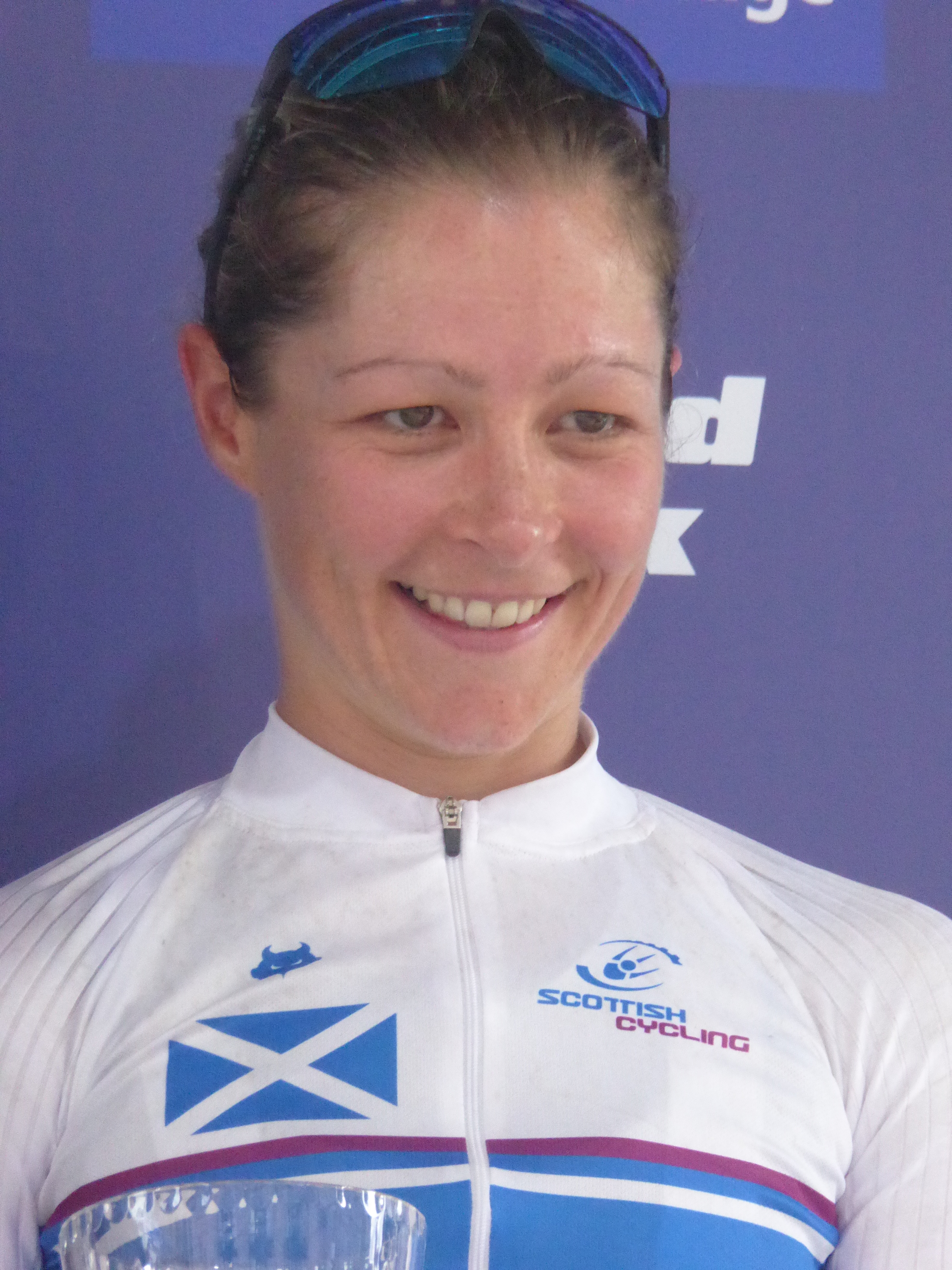
- George at the 2019 Women's Tour of Scotland

Personal information
- Full name: Jennifer George
- Born: Jennifer McNaught; 9 April 1983 (age 43) Darvel, Ayrshire, Scotland

Cycling career
- Sport: Cycling
- Discipline: Road
- Role: Rider; Directeur sportif

Amateur teams
- 2013–2014: Dulwich Paragon CC
- 2015: Les Filles Racing Team
- 2017: Storey Racing
- 2018–2019: Torelli–Beastwear–Brother
- 2022: The Independent Pedaler–Nopinz
- 2023: Huub WattShop

Professional teams
- 2016: Drops
- 2020–2021: Memorial–Santos

Managerial team
- 2022: AWOL O'Shea
Medal record
Women's road cycling
Representing Great Britain
UCI Gran Fondo World Championships
| Silver medal – second place | 2023 Scotland | 40–44 time trial |

Jennifer George (née McNaught; born 9 April 1983) is a Scottish racing cyclist, who most recently rode for British amateur team Huub WattShop.

Born in Glasgow, George grew up in Darvel, Ayrshire. George began cycling in 2012, with London club Dulwich Paragon CC, but soon found success winning the Scottish National Road Race Championships in 2018 and 2019. In 2023, George won a silver medal at the UCI Gran Fondo World Championships, in the time trial for riders aged 40–44.

== See also ==
- List of 2016 UCI Women's Teams and riders
