= UCI Cycling World Championships =

Quadrennial world championships for bicycle racing

- Status: Active
- Genre: Road bicycle racing, Track cycling, Marathon mountain bike racing, Mountain bike trials, BMX racing, Freestyle BMX, Artistic cycling
- Date: August–September
- Frequency: Quadrennially
- Location: Various
- Inaugurated: 2023
- Next event: 2027
- Organiser: UCI

The UCI Cycling World Championships is the multi-discipline world championship event for cycle sports, organised by its governing body the Union Cycliste Internationale (UCI). It brings together the individual cycling disciplines, which hold separate UCI World Championships events, to be held as part of one event every 4 years; these disciplines will also continue to hold separate annual world championship events outside of the planned quadrennial editions. The inaugural edition was held in 2023, and further editions are to be held in the year preceding the Olympic Games.

== Championships and locations ==
=== 2023 ===
The inaugural edition was hosted by the United Kingdom and ran from 3 to 13 August 2023 in Glasgow.

It included 13 individual UCI World Championships, and was billed as the biggest ever cycling event. It was announced that the championship would cover the events listed below:

- UCI Road World Championships
- UCI Para-cycling Road World Championships
- UCI Track Cycling World Championships
- UCI Para-cycling Track World Championships
- UCI Mountain Bike Marathon World Championships
- UCI Mountain Bike World Championships
- UCI Trials World Championships
- UCI BMX Freestyle Park World Championships
- UCI BMX Freestyle Flatland World Championships
- UCI BMX World Championships
- UCI Indoor Cycling World Championships
- UCI Gran Fondo World Championships

=== 2027 ===
In September 2022, the UCI announced that the 2027 edition is to be held in Haute-Savoie in France. It will include 19 disciplines: all those featuring in 2023, as well as gravel and junior track events.

=== 2031 ===
In September 2025, the UCI announced that the 2031 edition is to be held in Trentino in Italy.
