= UCI Gran Fondo World Championships =

Cycling competition

The UCI Gran Fondo World Championships are the culmination of a series of mass participation cycling events in the Gran Fondo/cyclosportive tradition. Unlike the UCI Road World Championships, which are considered an elite professional event, the Gran Fondo World Championship are targeted at mass participation and cyclists not in full-time professional teams, uniting amateurs and retired professionals, dedicated club cyclists and age-group competitors. Qualification for the World Championships is achieved through participation in the UCI Gran Fondo World Series.

In 2023, for the first time they were held together with the elite road racing championships as part of the inaugural 2023 UCI Cycling World Championships. Medals will be awarded in road race and time trial, across age-group classifications. Older riders compete in Medio Fondo, a shorter version of the Gran Fondo.
