= Jennifer George =

Jennifer George may refer to:

- Jennifer George (cyclist) (born 1983), British racing cyclist
- Jennifer George (basketball) (born 1991), American-Jamaican basketball player
