= Etape du Dales =

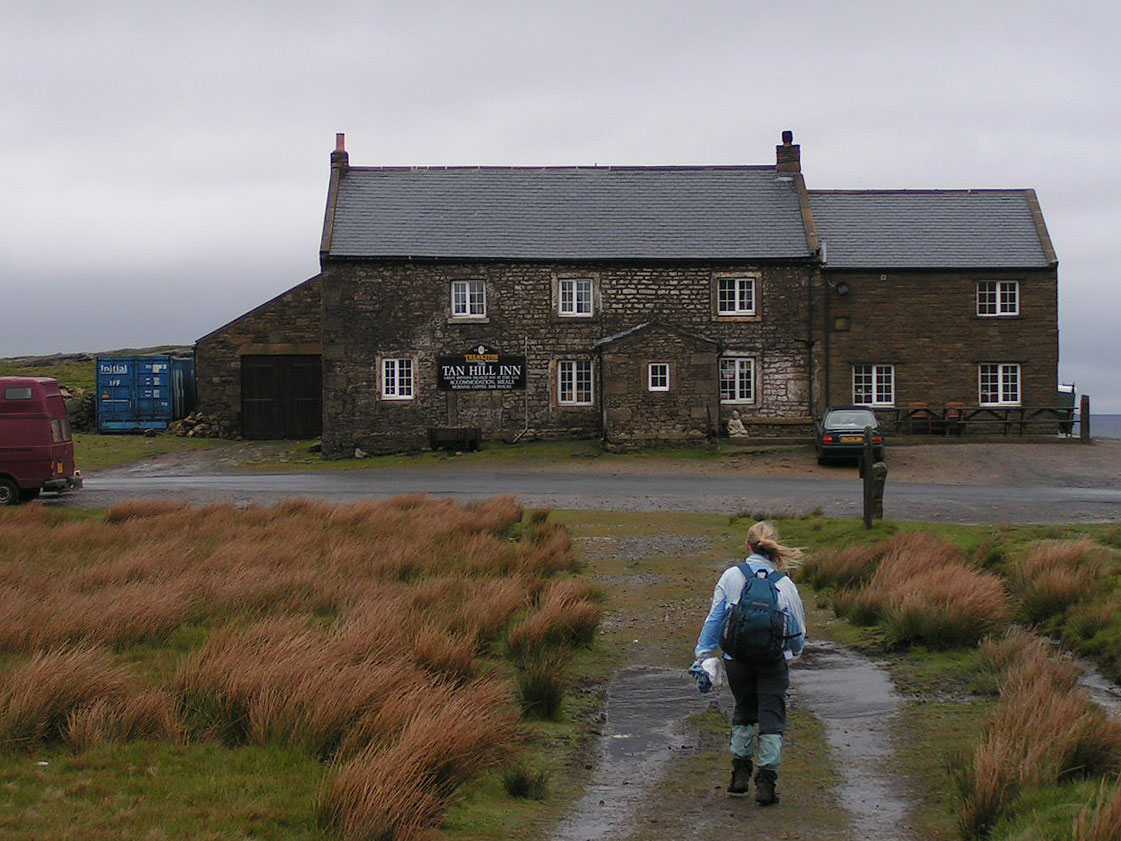
The Tan Hill Inn

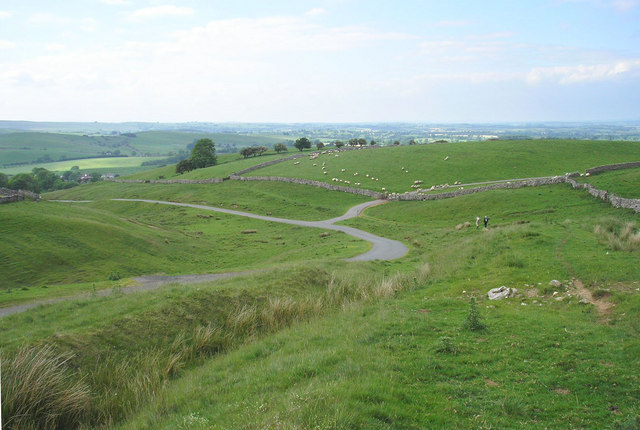
The road from Keld to Nateby

The Etape du Dales is a cyclosportive held in May each year, in the Yorkshire Dales in the UK. It was originally established as an alternative to the oversubscribed Fred Whitton Challenge; like the Fred Whitton, the Etape du Dales is a long day's ride over steep hills, and the proceeds go to charity – the Dave Rayner fund.

It is ranked as one of the most popular and challenging sportives in the UK, covering 112 miles (180 km) with 11,500 feet (3,500 m) of climbing and is considered one of the top ten rides in the UK.

Raynet provide communications support.

== Route ==
The Etape du Dales route is considered challenging.

The route starts and finishes at Wharfedale rugby club in Grassington. The route has varied slightly over time, but now includes Fleet Moss, Tan Hill Inn (the highest pub in England), Buttertubs Pass, and Coal Road. In 2009, the route was 109 miles (175 km), with around 11,500 feet (3,500 m) of ascents; in 2011, the total distance was 110 miles (180 km).

A shorter, gentler route, known as the Presidents Ride, is also available.

== Fastest times ==
Fastest rider times by year
Year	Name	Club/Team	Time
2019	Andy Cunningham	Wheelbase	05:36:20
2018	Andy Cunningham	Wheelbase	05:48:50
2016	Thomas Denwood	Harrogate Nova	05:40:32
2015	Andrew Blackwood	Shipley	06:23:48
2014	Greg 'The Guv' Ketteringham	Harrogate Nova	05:53:22
2013	Greg Ketteringham	Harrogate Nova	05:44:07
2012	Jon Sturman	Activ Cycles	05:48:28
2011	Jamie Laramée	Harrogate Nova	06:19:45
2010	Malcolm Elliott	Motorpoint Pro-Cycling Team	05:43:24
2009	Stephen Bottomly	CrossTrax	06:04:51
2008	Andrew Peace	Science in Sport	05:56:06
2007	Greg Ketteringham	Harrogate Nova	06:02:21
2006	Michael Pluckrose	TheEnduranceCoach.com	06:10:34
2005	Chris Young	Team Marie Curie	05:43:09

== See also ==
- Fred Whitton Challenge
