= Prudential RideLondon-Surrey 100 =

RideLondon-Surrey 100 logo

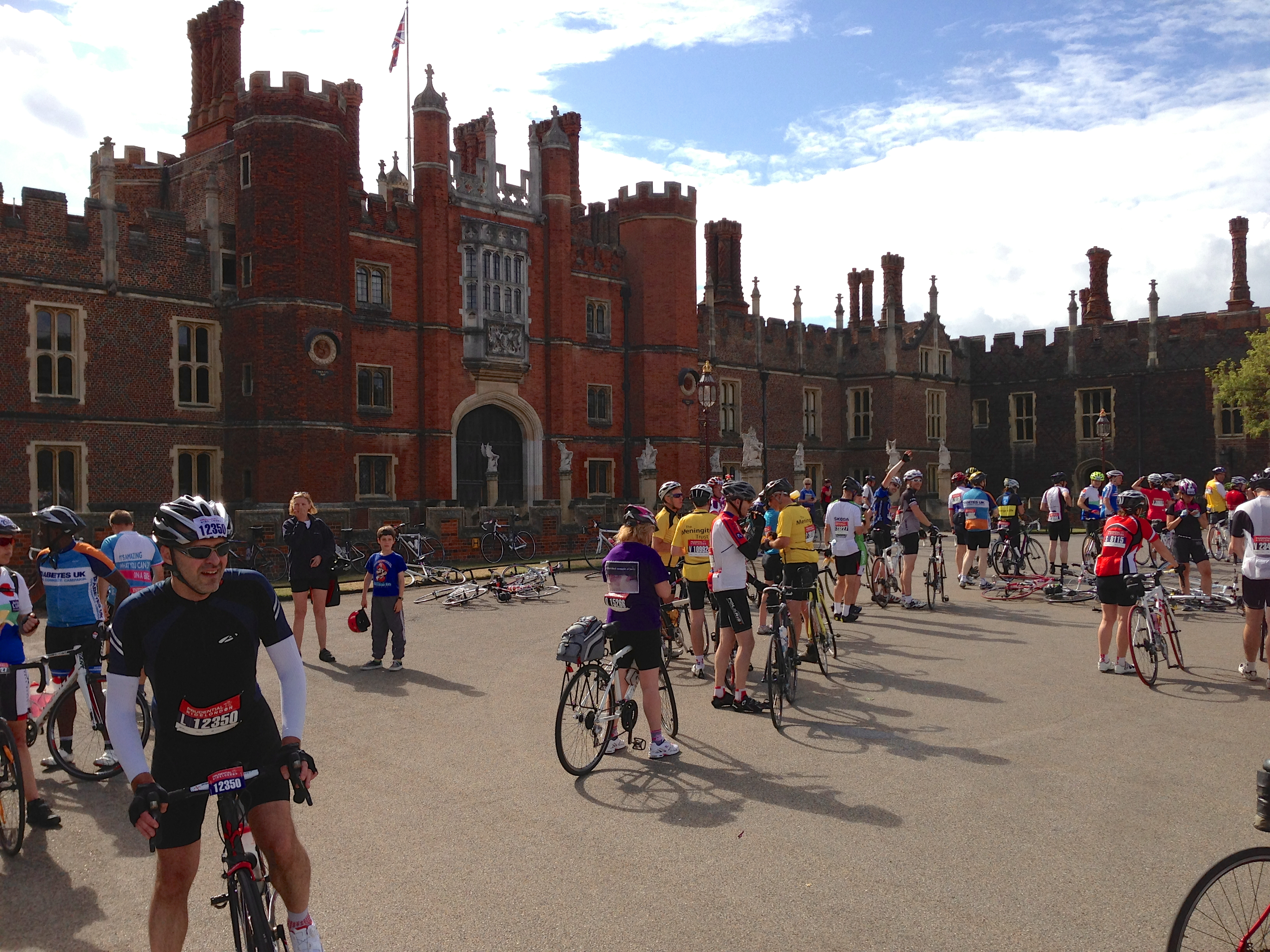
Water and food break at Hampton Court Palace on the 2013 ride.

The RideLondon-Surrey 100 is a 100-mile closed-road cyclosportive closely following the 2012 Olympic road race course (with a minor diversion, avoiding Richmond Hill) starting at the Queen Elizabeth Olympic Park and heading through central London and Surrey via Richmond Park, passing numerous iconic landmarks, including the Tower of London, Trafalgar Square, St. James's Palace, Harrods the Victoria & Albert Museum, and Hampton Court Palace, and climbing Leith Hill and Box Hill before returning through Wimbledon to London to finish on The Mall.

This cyclosportive was first held during the 2013 Prudential RideLondon two-day festival of cycling, during which nearly 16,000 cyclists including London mayor Boris Johnson completed the course.

After the May 2024 ride, the event "has been placed on indefinite pause" The event did not run in 2025 or 2026.
