= Time-Megeve-Mont-Blanc =

The Time-Megeve-Mont-Blanc is a cyclosportive that takes place early June in the northern part of the French Alps, 45 km from Geneva. This cycling event attracts 2,000 riders on a 140-km route that starts from the valley town of Sallanches and includes three passes: Col de la Colombiere, Col des Aravis, and Col des Saisies. The event finishes in the ski resort of Megève.

There are three choices of circuit: 80 km (Colombiere, Aravis — climbing 2850 m); 110 km (Colombiere, Aravis, Saisies — climbing 3930 m); 140 km (Colombiere, Aravis, two different ascents of Saisies — climbing 4810 m).

The route is designed so that the total amount of climbing on the longest course exactly equals the height of nearby Mont Blanc, the highest mountain in the Alps and for which the event is named. To complete this long course participants have to have reached control points before certain cut-off times, otherwise they are re-directed on to the shorter versions of the route. This is possible because the routes of the three courses share the same initial and final sections, but the longer routes also incorporate various additional detours on the Col des Saises.

The 2014 edition incorporated three new routes heading south of Megeve into the Beaufortin range: 80km 2000 m of climbing with two ascents of Col des Saisies; 110 km 3100m climbing with two ascents of Col des Saisies, Col des Pres, Lac de Roselend; 135km 3500m climbing with two ascents of Col des Saisies, Col des Pres, Lac de Roselend; Col de la Forclaz. Safety considerations following the death of a Swiss rider in the 2010 edition has led to the organisers neutralising downhill sections, participants passing through timing sections at the top and bottom of the major climbs.

== See also ==
- Challenge riding
- Cyclosportive
