= La Marmotte =

Annual cycling event in France

La Marmotte is an annual, one-day cyclosportive event in France for amateur cyclists. It is named after the large ground squirrel that is known to inhabit the slopes of the final climb to the finish in Alpe d'Huez. The first event held in 1982 makes it one of the oldest cyclosportive events of its kind and in France it is often called La Doyenne ("the old lady"), borrowing the nickname given to the professional road race Liège–Bastogne–Liège. The Marmotte remains one of the most popular cyclosportive events today in Europe, with interest in participation exceeding the 7000 places available.

== Route ==
Unlike the other famous French cyclosportive, the Étape du Tour, that has a different route each year, the Marmotte route is fixed. Covering a distance of 174.4 km (108.4 mi) and with 5,180 m (16,990 ft) of climbing, the route is considered to be one of the hardest of any cyclosportive and comparable to the most challenging high mountain stages of the Tour de France. Several famous Tour de France mountains feature; the Col du Glandon, Col du Télégraphe, Col du Galibier and the final ascent of the legendary Alpe d'Huez. Le Bourg-d'Oisans hosts the start of the event.

The route for the 2015 edition was changed due to the Tunnel du Chambon (the route off the Galibier to the Alpe) being closed due to cracks being found after a landslide. The altered route included the Lacets de Montvernier and also the ascent of the Col de Croix de Fer via the Col du Mollard (starting from Villargondran). The route was 176 km, including 5,200m of climb.

Location	Altitude (m)	Distance (km)	Information
Le Bourg-d'Oisans	719	0	Timing starts
La Paute	730	2	
Rochetaillé	711	7	
RD1091 – D526			
Allemont	820	10	
Le Rivier	1254	20	
D926 – D927	1907	35.5	
Col du Glandon	1924	35.7	Feed station Water station Medical services Timing stops
Saint Colomban des Villards	1102	46	Medical services
Saint Alban des Villards	882	53	
Saint Étienne de Cuines	450	56.5	Timing starts
D927 – D74	431	57.7	
Sainte Marie de Cuines	420	58.5	
D74 – RD1006		63.4	
RD1006 (St Jean de Maurienne)	465	67.4	
St Michel de Maurienne	712	81.4	Water station
D902			
Col du Télégraphe	1570	92.9	Water station
Valloire	1430	97.9	Feed station Water station Medical services
Plan Lachat		105.4	Water station
Les Granges du Galibier		109.4	
Col du Galibier	2642	114.9	Feed station Water station Medical services
Col du Lautaret	2057	122.4	Medical services
RD1091			
La Grave	1481	133.4	
Le Freney d'Oisans	900	149.4	
Le Bourg-d'Oisans	719	161.4	Feed station Water station Medical services
D211			
La Garde	1000	165.4	
Huez	1495	170.5	Water station
Alpe d'Huez	1880	174.4	Feed station Water station Medical services Timing stops

== Organisation ==
=== Entry ===
Online entry on the event's official website is possible but demand greatly exceeds the limited number of places available (approximately 7000). In 2012, the event entry website received more than 6000 individual online applications in one day and was forced to suspend further online applications. In 2013, entries for the Marmotte Gran Fondo event opened at midnight CET on 30 November. The site was intermittently unusable as the number of requests exceeded what it was capable of handling. Numerous bugs were also apparent as some users were only able to enter by registering as new users.

A limited number places are available to groups, organised sporting holiday companies and individuals who enter the Trophee de l'Oisans, a series of cyclosportive events held in the Oisans region over the previous week, starting with the Vaujany Master ride.

=== The start and timing ===
Owing to the sheer number of participants, a staggered start is necessary, with riders batched by race number and those with lower race numbers departing first. The first batch of riders depart at 0700 CET. Priority race numbers are given to a selected number of elite riders who have posted very good times in previous attempts or can provide evidence that they are capable of competing with the best riders. Non-elite riders that have posted good times in the past are also batched in the lower number range. Since timing does not begin until the rider has crossed the start line, theoretically there is no disadvantage to starting from the back of the field. However, since the faster riders depart first it is potentially advantageous to be batched in the earlier groups and take advantage of pelotons moving at greater speeds. In addition, the sheer number of participants can lead to congestion on the roads and at feed stations.

Electronic timing chips given to each rider record the finishing time and split times at various points around the course.

From 2010 the descent of the Col du Glandon was neutralised to discourage riders from descending too recklessly and endangering themselves and other riders. The descent would usually take about 30–35 minutes.

=== Facilities ===
Major feed stations are usually placed at the summit of the Col du Glandon, start of the Galibier climb (2 km outside Valloire), summit of the Galibier and at the foot of Alpe d'Huez. Intermediary water stops are scattered throughout as are a limited number of temporary toilet facilities.

== Statistics ==
=== Men's Winners ===
Year	Winner	Time	Age category
2023	Loïc Ruffaut (FRA)	05:49:01	30-39
2022	Stefan Kirchmair (AUT)	05:20:20	30-39
2021	Kenny Nijssen (NED)	05:34:19	30-39
2019	Antonio Garnero (BRA)	05:34:57	30-39
2018	Michiel Minnaert (BEL)	05:39:39	18-29
2017	Eddy Finé (FRA)	05:42:45	18-29
2016	Kenny Nijssen (NED)	05:40:01	18-29
2015	Stefano Sala (ITA)	05:54:30	40-49
2014	Peter Pouly (FRA)	05:34:44	30-39
2013	Bart Bury (BEL)	05:32:01	30-39
2012	Sander Armée (BEL)	05:33:14	18-29
2011	Michel Snel (NED)	05:32:23	30-39
2010	Michel Snel (NED)	05:46:06	30-39
2009	Bert Dekker (NED)	06:09:00	30-39
2008	Antonio Corradini (ITA)	06:02:12	30-39
2007	Andrea Ciavatti (ITA)	06:00:59	30-39
2006	Emanuele Negrini (ITA)	05:50:30	30-39
2005	Emanuele Negrini (ITA)	05:49:40	30-39
2004	Daniele de Paoli (ITA)	06:03:52	30-39
2003	Laurens ten Dam (NED)	06:07:04	18-29
2002	Bert Dekker (NED)	06:39:58	30-39
2001	Stefano Giraldi (ITA)	06:12:40	30-39
1999	Bert Dekker (NED)	06:22:00	18-29
1998	Didier Miranda (FRA)	06:25:34	30-39
1997	Bert Dekker (NED)	06:40:19	18-29
1996	Patrice Halgand (FRA)	06:32:36	18-29
1995	Tom de Jong (NED)	06:43:11	18-29
1994	Francisque Teyssier (FRA)	06:24:44	18-29
1993	Patrick Bruet (FRA)	06:24:37	30-39
1992	Laurent Brochard (FRA)	06:43:50	18-29
1991	Benoit Nave (FRA)	06:20:04	18-29
1990	Pascal Rota (FRA)	06:30:22	30-39
1989	Pascal Rota (FRA)	06:27:42	30-39
1988	Pascal Rota (FRA)	06:23:39	30-39
1987	Pascal Rota (FRA)	06:29:53	18-29
1986	Etienne Neant (FRA)	06:37:36	30-39
1985	Marc Criel (BEL)	06:47:01	30-39
1984	Fons Moors (BEL)	06:58:52	40-49
1983	Alain Gary (FRA)	07:08:49	40-49
1982	François Indalecio (FRA)	07:21:19	20-29

=== Men's Lanterne Rouge ===
Year	Name	Nationality	Time	Age category
2021	James Knights	GBR	13:00:04	30-39
2019	Roland Mooren	NED	13:12:26	50-59
2018	Martijn Davenport	GBR	12:59:28	50-59
2017	Hidde Schwietert	NED	11:29:13	18-29
2016	Bill Smith	GBR	12:57:43	67+
2015	John Simpson	GBR	14:34:39	40-49
2014	Torben Larsen	DEN	13:25:04	60+
2013	Siebe Vrieswijk	NED	14:17:33	18-29
2012	Sander Arends	BEL	14:12:32	30-39
2011	Lloyd Moore	IRE	13:50:00	50-59
2010	John MacDonald	GBR	13:43:20	40-49
2009	Ole Thomsen	DEN	13:19:39	60-66
2008	Bo Leerberg	DEN	13:42:32	30-39
2007	Geoffrey Woodhouse	GBR	13:52:12	60+
2006	Adam Witherington	GBR	13:55:01	30-39
2005	Jordi Moix	ESP	13:23:43	40-49
2004	Peter Glendawar	JER	13:21:35	50-59
2003	Alwin Siegersma	NED	13:49:40	18-29
2002	Philippe Rabut	FRA	13:52:25	40-49
2001	Yves Gachon	FRA	12:56:44	18-29
2000	Antoni Busquet	AND	13:23:59	40-49
1999	Christian Crampe	FRA	13:43:39	50-59
1998	Christiaan Kesselmans	NED	13:02:08	50-59
1997	Gilles Penot	FRA	12:03:30	30-39
1996	Laurent Morel	BEL	11:57:27	18-29
1995	Willem Feyen	NED	11:34:02	40-49
1994	Marco Manenti	ITA	12:56:59	40-49
1993	Willem van de Meent	NED	12:56:59	50-59
1992	Jean Gain	FRA	12:30:00	60+
1991	Carl Westra	NED	12:32:02	40-49
1990	Fernando Silvestre Dos Santos	FRA	12:21:10	18-29
1989	Pieter Gietermans	NED	12:56:59	40-49
1988	J.Luc Mason	FRA	12:11:00	30-39
1987	Phillpe Gilson	BEL	12:33:11	30-39
1986	Javier Fancisco Etxaide-Juantorena	ESP	11:56:14	30-39
1985	Maurice Paret	FRA	12:56:28	50-59
1984	Joseph Wislet	FRA	13:05:31	30-39
1983	Edouard Richard	FRA	13:58:37	30-39
