= Tour of Crete =

The official logo of The Tour of Crete cyclosportive

The Tour of Crete is a multi-stage cyclosportive for amateur cyclists, held in the island of Crete, Greece, which took place for the first time in 2016 and will take place annually thereafter. It spans across 6 stages starting from and ending in the capital of the region of Crete, in the city of Heraklion.

Similarly to other cyclosportives, it is a non-competitive event, the routes of which are well sign-posted and marshalled. Riders are able to use feeding stations positioned at intervals along the route to replenish their food and drink supplies and mechanical and medical support is also provided.

== Stages ==
The Tour of Crete is concluded in 6 individual stages in consecutive days, covering a total distance of approximately 650 kilometres (400 miles) and total vertical gain of 12,000 metres (39,000 feet).

Stage	Start - Finish	Distance	Total Gain	Technical Information
1	Stage 1: Heraklion - Elounda	114 km (71 mi)	2,068 m (6,785 ft)	View Analysis
2	Stage 2: Elounda - Ierapetra	139 km (86 mi)	2,068 m (6,785 ft)	View Analysis
3	Stage 3: Ierapetra - Agia Galini	147 km (91 mi)	2,690 m (8,830 ft)	View Analysis
4	Stage 4: Agia Galini - Plakias	51 km (32 mi)	1,157 m (3,796 ft)	View Analysis
5	Stage 5: Plakias - Rethymnon	87 km (54 mi)	2,152 m (7,060 ft)	View Analysis
6	Stage 6: Rethymnon - Heraklion	71 km (44 mi)	1,288 m (4,226 ft)	View Analysis
