= Dragon Ride Wales =

Coordinates: 51°34′51.3″N 3°43′43.5″W

Dragon Ride L'Etape Wales by Le Tour de France is a cyclosportive event based in South Wales, UK.

The event is a non competitive cycling marathon run over the hills of South Wales and the Brecon Beacons National Park. The ride takes in the challenging climbs of the Bwlch and Rhigos mountain roads which are long with relatively constant gradients. The event has different courses to suit riders ability, these are the 'Dragon Devil' at 305 kilometres (190 mi), the Gran Fondo at 230 kilometres (140 mi), the Medio Fondo at 153 kilometres (95 mi) and the Macmillan 100 at 100 kilometres (62 mi).

The Dragon Ride is held annually in June. Entries are available from September via the event website. Traditionally the event sells out within weeks of the entries becoming available. Cyclosportives are a recent addition to the UK, although these types of events have been popular in Italy, France and Spain.

== History ==
In 2004 the first Dragon Ride was held, this being at the time one of only a handful of such events in Great Britain. The format of the Dragon Ride was based on an Italian Gran Fondo, although unlike Italian events it was not held on closed roads. Event organiser Lou Lusardi, whose family originated from the Parma area of Italy, had taken part in several Gran Fondo and saw an opportunity to bring this type of event to South Wales. An organising team of friends and relatives was set up under the BreakAway Cycling banner. Based in Bridgend, the first "Dragon" had 280 entrants. Recent editions had over 5,000 entrants.

In 2005 the Dragon Ride became the first UK cyclosportive to be included into the UCI calendar. The popularity of the inaugural event and the demand for this type of cycling challenge saw the Dragon Ride more than double in size each year between 2004 and 2006; a continual growth over the following years saw the 2010 event with 3700 entrants, the largest for any UK open road sportive. In 2007 the Dragon Ride linked up with the Cape Argus Pick n Pay Cycletour in Cape Town South Africa and the Lake Taupo Cycle Challenge in New Zealand to cross promote and share resources. Pencoed, situated a few miles east of Bridgend became the venue for the start and finish of the ride from 2008, the new location provided more space and was situated only a mile from junction 35 of the M4 Motorway. Since 2012 the start and finish is at Margam Park near Port Talbot.

The Dragon Ride organisers have introduced various innovations. The event was the first to use online entries, with riders numbers and timing transponders posted out in the weeks prior to the event. In 2010 a totally disposable timing chip was introduced eliminating the need for riders to hand back their transponder at the end of the ride.

BreakAway Cycling sold the rights of the Dragon Ride to Participate Sports, (now Human Race) in December 2012.

In 2016, through a partnership with Tour de France organisers, Amaury Sport Organisation, the event became part of the L'Etape UK series of official Tour de France sportives and was renamed Dragon Ride L'Etape Wales by Le Tour de France.

== Bibliography ==
- Dragon Ride website
