= 2023 UCI Cycling World Championships =

Inaugural UCI Cycling world Championship held in the UK

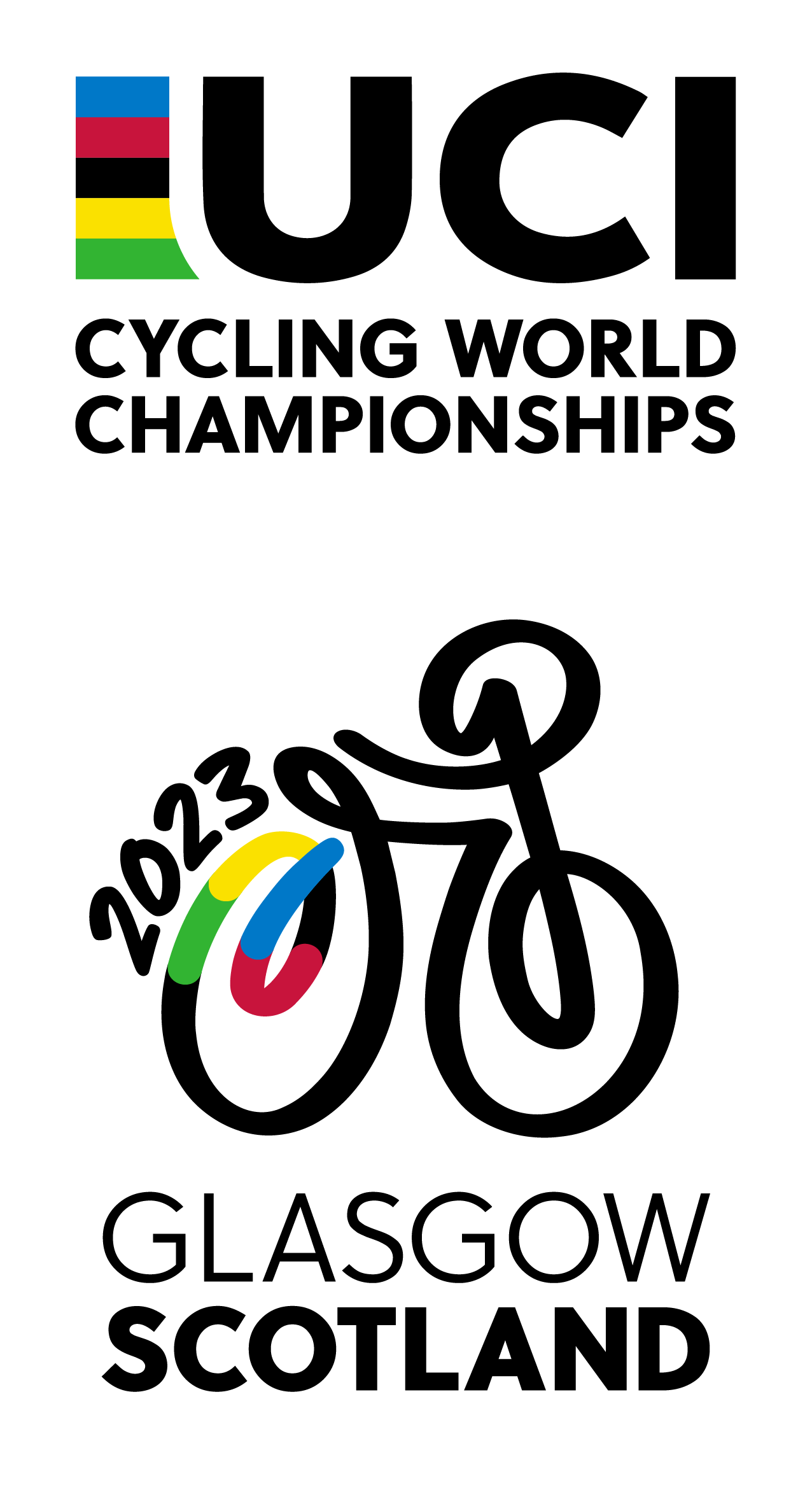
- Venue: Glasgow and across Scotland
- Date: 3–13 August 2023
- Coordinates: 55.8611°N 4.25°W
- Cyclists participating: c. 8,000
- Events: 216 in 13 Sports

The 2023 UCI Cycling World Championships was the inaugural edition of the UCI Cycling World Championships organised by the Union Cycliste Internationale (UCI), held between 3 and 13 August 2023 in Glasgow.

The UCI Cycling World Championships, to be held every four years in the year preceding the Olympic Games, brings together various disciplines of cycling for them to be held as part of one event, including the UCI Road World Championships, UCI Mountain Bike World Championships and UCI Track Cycling World Championships.

The event had a budget of £45–50 million, with funding coming from various local and national bodies, including the Scottish Government and UK Sport. Glasgow City Council provided £15 million to the championships after it was predicted the economic boost would total £67 million.

== Championships and locations ==
The 2023 UCI Cycling World Championships hosted individual UCI World Championships in 13 different disciplines, and was the world's biggest ever cycling event to date. It was confirmed that the following events would feature, with the full schedule announced on 8 September 2022.

In total, over 200 world champions were crowned and 2,600 athletes travelled to compete at the events with a further 8,000 cyclists taking part in a mass participation event. Disciplines included events for professional and amateurs, able-bodied and para cyclists, youth and age-grade athletes

The UCI Cyclo-cross World Championships, which are considered a winter discipline, and the UCI Gravel World Championships which were introduced after the awarding of the 2023 championships, and require a very specific terrain, are the only UCI disciplines not included, while junior and under-23 track cycling was also not included.

Championships		Location(s)	Article
UCI Road World Championships		Edinburgh (road race; start) (Note: For the men's road race only.); Loch Lomond (road race; start) (Note: For the women's road race and the men's under-23 road race.); George Square (road race; finish); Stirlingshire (time trial)	
UCI Para-cycling Road World Championships		Dumfries and Galloway	
UCI Track Cycling World Championships		Sir Chris Hoy Velodrome	
UCI Para-cycling Track World Championships		Sir Chris Hoy Velodrome	
UCI Mountain Bike Marathon World Championships		Glentress Forest	
UCI Mountain Bike World Championships	Cross-country	Glentress Forest	
UCI Mountain Bike World Championships	Downhill	Nevis Range	
UCI Trials World Championships		Glasgow Green	
UCI BMX Freestyle Park World Championships		Glasgow Green	
UCI BMX Freestyle Flatland World Championships		Glasgow Green	
UCI BMX Racing World Championships		Glasgow BMX Centre	
UCI Indoor Cycling World Championships		Commonwealth Arena	
UCI Gran Fondo World Championships		Perth and Kinross (road races); Dundee and Angus (time trials)	

== Schedule ==
115 events in cycling and 101 events in para cycling. In cycling UCI Gran Fondo World Championships had most event in this games with 40 events.

Legend
C	competition day	Number of finals

Full Schedule
Sports	Date (August)												
Sports	Wed 2	Thu 3	Fri 4	Sat 5	Sun 6	Mon 7	Tue 8	Wed 9	Thu 10	Fri 11	Sat 12	Sun 13	Total
BMX Freestyle Flatland									2				2
BMX Freestyle Park						2							2
BMX Racing												6	6
Indoor cycling										1	2	4	7
Track cycling		3	3	2	4	3	3	4					22
Road cycling				2	1		1	1	3	2	1	2	13
Gran Fondo			20			20							40
Para-cycling track		8	7	5	8	12	8						48
Para-cycling road								14	12	14	12	1	53
Trials								1			5		6
Mountain bike cross-country								3	4	2	2		11
Mountain bike downhill			2	2									4
Mountain bike marathon					2								2
Rainbow jersey		11	32	11	15	37	12	23	21	19	22	13	216

== Medal tables ==
=== Overall ===
* Host nation (Great Britain)

Rank	Nation	Gold	Silver	Bronze	Total
1	Great Britain*	47	23	30	100
2	France	26	28	25	79
3	Netherlands	20	15	3	38
4	Germany	19	19	15	53
5	United States	15	9	12	36
6	Belgium	10	8	11	29
7	Switzerland	9	9	7	25
8	China	8	12	11	31
9	New Zealand	8	8	15	31
10	Australia	7	21	10	38
11	Spain	7	10	5	22
12	Italy	7	9	14	30
13	Denmark	4	2	5	11
14	Canada	3	7	9	19
15	Japan	3	6	6	15
16	Norway	3	3	2	8
17	Austria	2	3	9	14
18	Ireland	2	3	6	11
19	Poland	2	2	2	6
20	Ukraine	2	2	0	4
21	Czech Republic	2	1	0	3
22	Israel	2	0	0	2
22	Latvia	2	0	0	2
24	Brazil	1	3	3	7
25	Colombia	1	2	2	5
26	Portugal	1	2	0	3
27	South Africa	1	1	1	3
28	Argentina	1	1	0	2
29	Sweden	1	0	1	2
30	Hungary	1	0	0	1
30	Kazakhstan	1	0	0	1
30	Liechtenstein	1	0	0	1
30	Luxembourg	1	0	0	1
34	Slovakia	0	2	2	4
35	South Korea	0	2	0	2
35	Thailand	0	2	0	2
37	Chile	0	1	0	1
37	Trinidad and Tobago	0	1	0	1
37	Venezuela	0	1	0	1
40	Slovenia	0	0	4	4
41	Costa Rica	0	0	1	1
41	Ecuador	0	0	1	1
41	Finland	0	0	1	1
41	Hong Kong	0	0	1	1
41	Malaysia	0	0	1	1
Totals (45 entries)		220	218	215	653

=== Cycling ===
This medal table refers to all events except for para-cycling, including Gran Fondo.

* Host nation (Great Britain)

Rank	Nation	Gold	Silver	Bronze	Total
1	Great Britain*	23	12	21	56
2	Germany	14	12	6	32
3	France	13	19	10	42
4	United States	11	6	6	23
5	Belgium	8	5	8	21
6	Netherlands	7	6	3	16
7	Switzerland	6	5	5	16
8	New Zealand	6	4	9	19
9	Spain	3	6	4	13
10	Norway	3	3	1	7
11	Denmark	3	2	4	9
12	Australia	2	10	4	16
13	Italy	2	4	5	11
14	Austria	2	2	8	12
15	Poland	2	1	2	5
16	Israel	2	0	0	2
16	Latvia	2	0	0	2
18	Canada	1	4	3	8
19	Japan	1	3	4	8
20	Portugal	1	2	0	3
21	Argentina	1	1	0	2
21	Brazil	1	1	0	2
21	Colombia	1	1	0	2
24	Hungary	1	0	0	1
24	Kazakhstan	1	0	0	1
24	Liechtenstein	1	0	0	1
24	Luxembourg	1	0	0	1
28	Ireland	0	2	1	3
29	China	0	1	2	3
30	Chile	0	1	0	1
30	Czech Republic	0	1	0	1
30	South Africa	0	1	0	1
30	Trinidad and Tobago	0	1	0	1
30	Venezuela	0	1	0	1
35	Slovenia	0	0	4	4
36	Costa Rica	0	0	1	1
36	Ecuador	0	0	1	1
36	Finland	0	0	1	1
36	Hong Kong	0	0	1	1
36	Slovakia	0	0	1	1
36	Sweden	0	0	1	1
Totals (41 entries)		119	117	116	352

=== Para-cycling ===
* Host nation (Great Britain)

Rank	Nation	Gold	Silver	Bronze	Total
1	Great Britain*	24	11	9	44
2	France	13	9	15	37
3	Netherlands	13	9	0	22
4	China	8	11	9	28
5	Australia	5	11	6	22
6	Germany	5	7	9	21
7	Italy	5	5	9	19
8	Spain	4	4	1	9
9	United States	4	3	6	13
10	Switzerland	3	4	2	9
11	New Zealand	2	4	6	12
12	Canada	2	3	6	11
13	Belgium	2	3	3	8
14	Japan	2	3	2	7
15	Ukraine	2	2	0	4
16	Ireland	2	1	5	8
17	Czech Republic	2	0	0	2
18	Denmark	1	0	1	2
18	South Africa	1	0	1	2
20	Sweden	1	0	0	1
21	Brazil	0	2	3	5
22	Slovakia	0	2	1	3
23	South Korea	0	2	0	2
23	Thailand	0	2	0	2
25	Colombia	0	1	2	3
26	Austria	0	1	1	2
27	Poland	0	1	0	1
28	Malaysia	0	0	1	1
28	Norway	0	0	1	1
Totals (29 entries)		101	101	99	301
