= Tour Pour La Mer =

Tour Pour La Mer is a bi-annual fundraising charity cycle ride organised in the United Kingdom.

Founded in 2005 it is a shipping industry event which seeks to raise the profile of the positive contribution shipping makes to society and to raise money for the needs of seafarers and the marine environment. The 2007 event was a one-day ride from Southampton and was organised in support of the Mission to Seafarers. It raised over £100,000.

The event is notable for the involvement of companies in the shipping world, and for the large sums of money raised.
