= Col de Cou =

Mountain pass in Switzerland and France

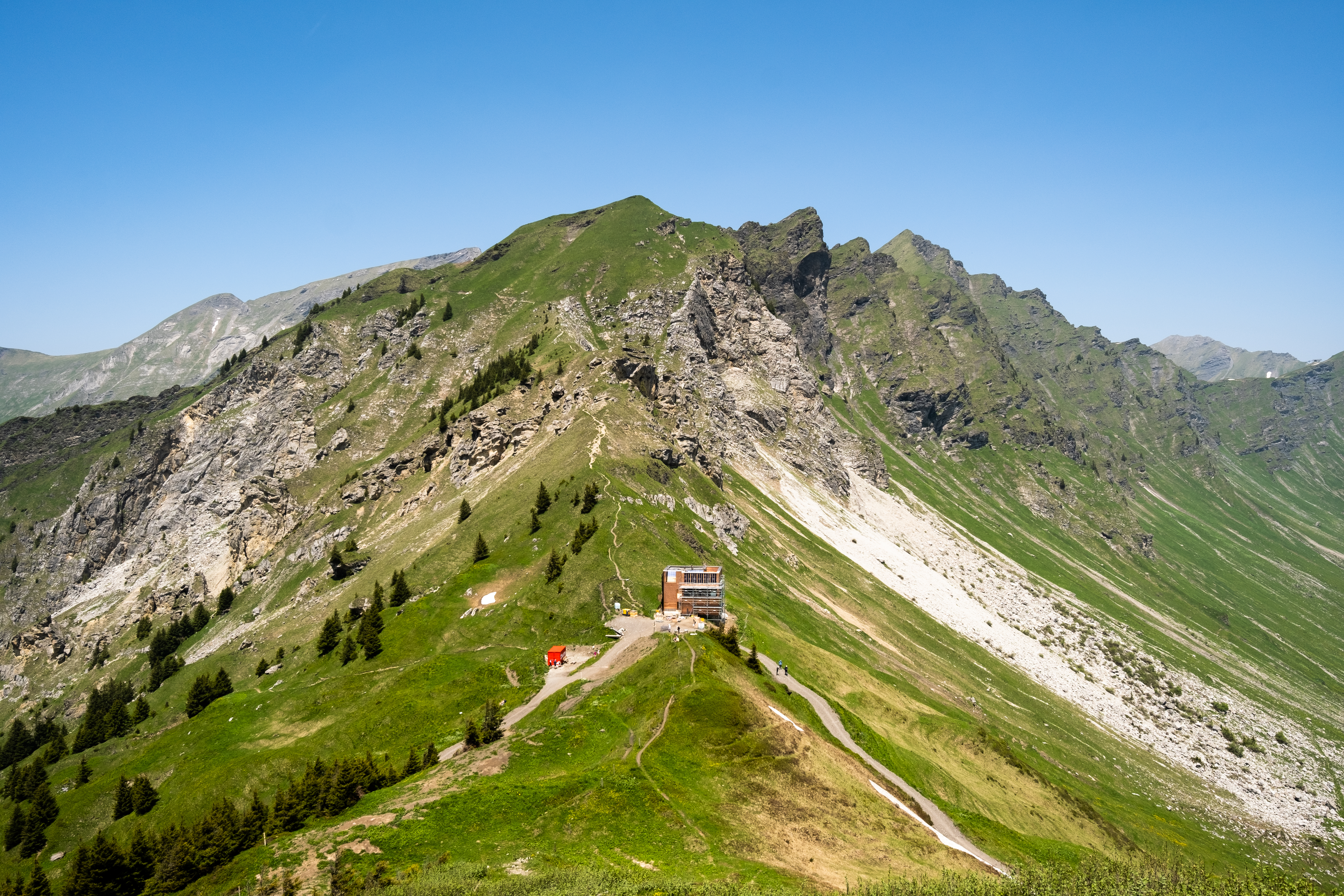
- Col de Cou seen from the South

- Location within Alps
- Elevation: 1,921 metres (6,302 ft)
- Traversed by: Trail

Third Approach
- Location: Valais, Switzerland; Haute-Savoie, France
- Range: Alps
- Coordinates: 46°09′01″N 06°47′34″E

The Col de Cou (also spelled Col de Coux) (1,921 m) is a high mountain pass of the Alps, located on the border between Switzerland and France. It connects Champéry in the Swiss canton of Valais to Morzine in the French department of Haute-Savoie. It is the lowest border crossing between the Pas de Morgins and the Dents du Midi.
