= Gran Fondo =

Bicycle race

A Gran Fondo is a type of long-distance road cycling ride originating in Italy in 1970, and roughly translates into English as "Big Ride". Italian Gran Fondos are officially defined and certified by the Italian Cycling Federation as a bicycle event at least 120 kilometres (75 mi) long, and are individually chip-timed (start to finish) races with prizes for the fastest riders in each category. The starts are done en masse, and the format allows for riders of every level to participate, much like a marathon, where most participants are competing against the clock instead of other participants. Traditionally a large meal is served to the participants at the end of the event, and roads are shut down.

Nowadays only a handful of the largest Italian Gran Fondos have full road closures, but laws requiring riders to obey all traffic signals are more lax in Italy compared to other western countries.

The first few Gran Fondo events in the United States were organized in 2009, and as of 2017 there were over 200 events in North America. Although US Gran Fondos are independently owned and operated, Gran Fondo National Series organizes the official USA Cycling Gran Fondo National Championships. Gran Fondos in the US come in many different varieties with some adhering very strictly to the traditional definition (often going as far as to have a full road closure), and others treating it more like a century ride where riders only compete in short timed sections and enjoy a large elaborate banquet at the finish.

Since 2016, the Union Cycliste Internationale (UCI) organizes a Gran Fondo World Series, incorporating some of the Gran Fondo events listed below as qualifier events, and a final race to award the UCI Gran Fondo World Championships to elite and masters amateur riders in their respective age groups. Recent finals took place in Perth (Australia; 2016), Albi (France; 2017), Varese (Italy; 2018), Poznan (Poland; 2019), Sarajevo (Bosnia and Herzegovina; 2021), and Trento (Italy; 2022). Upcoming finals will be hosted by Glasgow (UK; 2023), Aalborg (Denmark; 2024), Melbourne (Australia; 2025), and Victoriaville (Canada; 2026).

== History ==
The first Gran Fondo was the Nove Colli held on July 12, 1970, in Cesenatico, Italy. With chip timing becoming more popular in the 1990s, the number of Gran Fondo events grew rapidly in Italy. While many Gran Fondos came and went, a few have remained since the early years, such as Gran Fondo Cooperatori, Gran Fondo 10 Colli, Gran Fondo Felice Gimondi.

The Italian cycling federation "Federciclismo" provides rules of what makes an Italian Gran Fondo.

Similar events were soon held in other countries, most notably France, where they are called “Cyclosportive”.

== Today ==
Today, Gran Fondo events are held in many countries. However, not all of them follow the true Italian Gran Fondo model of a cycling marathon.

Italy

In Italy, Gran Fondos are held between February and October. A full list can be found on dalzero.it. “Dal zero” means “from zero” and refers to the way Gran Fondos are usually raced: “a tutta” or “all out”, from the start.

In Italy, a "dilettante" is an Elite amateur under the age of 25 trying to turn professional. Only a handful of athletes have a chance to turn pro each year. Others either end their cycling career, have to continue racing small circuit races, or compete at Gran Fondos, which explains the competitiveness at Gran Fondos and their popularity.

Argentina

In Argentina, Gran Fondo cycling is still a rather new concept. In 2013, the first one was held in San Luis, which many consider the cycling capital of Argentina, given that the men’s professional race Tour de San Luis and the women’s professional race Tour Femenino are held there as well.

Today, the Gran Fondo in San Luis is part of the GFNY World series and now called GFNY Argentina. The other notable event is Gran Fondo Buenos Aires, which was first held in 2015. It is a relatively short (100 km) but flat and fast race.

Australia

Despite the growth of cycling in Australia, Gran Fondo events are still relatively rare. Yet, Amy’s Gran Fondo is one of the most notable globally, held along the Great Ocean Road, with 2,500 riders completing the Gran Fondo distance.

On the west coast, Perth has been holding a successful Gran Fondo race that has featured as “UCI Granfondo World Championship”.

In the north, Darwin's Top End Gran Fondo was the third Gran Fondo in Australia starting in 2012. The Top End event has become an annual event in the Australian cycling calendar, showcasing the unique NT landscape.

In South East Queensland, Tour de Brisbane hosts a Gran Fondo course starting in 2019. The July 2021 event had over 4,000 rider registrations.

Austria

In Austria, the generally used term for Gran Fondo is Radmarathon. This can be confusing because events with that same term in Germany are non-timed bike tours. While not as competitive as the Italian counterpart, Radmarathons are true Gran Fondo-style races. The mother of them all is the Oetztaler Radmarathon, over 240 km with 5,200 m of climbing, one of the hardest Gran Fondo races in the world that attracts a sold-out field of 4,000 riders.

Belgium

In Belgium, local laws prevent Gran Fondo races. A lot of events have tried it but all that is left are bike tours. While thousands of riders get to experience events on the same courses like the pros – e.g. at Ronde Van Vlaanderen – they cannot race them.

Brazil

After a few hiccups with early events that were held and later got cancelled, Brasil is starting to embrace Gran Fondo races now that larger organizations have appeared. Under ASO license, the inaugural L'Etape Brasil was held in 2015. Starting in 2017, Gran Fondo New York grants a license to a race organizer in Brasil to host GFNY Brasil.

Canada

Owing to its French heritage, Quebec embraces the cyclosportive culture which is identical to Italian Gran Fondos. In the English-speaking part of the country, many events do not offer racing despite the Gran Fondo name. Gran Fondo Canada hosted the inaugural Gran Fondo Whistler in 2010. Gran Fondo Banff was held in Banff until 2016. There are increasingly new Gran Fondo events which are timed but attract recreational cyclists wanting to participate for personal challenge and celebrating cycling on this style of ride, such as the County Gran Fondo in Prince Edward County, Ontario.

Chile

In Chile, road cycling has to catch up in popularity with mountain biking and triathlon, but several Gran Fondo events are showing up on the scene, like Gran Fondo Giro del Lago, and set for 2017, GFNY Chile just outside Santiago.

China

Since 2014, a challenging multi-stage and multi-city event has been organised in the Southwestern province Yunnan. The Colourful Yunnan Granfondo Cycling Festival is a popular event with an international field of participants. Also known simply as Granfondo Yunnan, it not only offers tough mountain courses but also focuses on the cultural, ethnic and culinary features of the province.

Colombia

Colombia is a country where enthusiasm for cycling is near Italian levels and bigger than in most other countries. Thanks to the new generation of cyclists in the 2010s, Gran Fondo races gained a lot of attention and became very popular, hosted by local stars like Rigoberto Urán El Giro de Rigo, Nairo Quintana Gran Fondo Nairo Quintana, and even old glories like Santiago Botero La Ruta Colombia, as well as GFNY Colombia (first held in 2015). The popular La Ruta Colombia Gran Fondo series with two events in changing locations as well as the one-off Gran Fondo Hincapie are not Gran Fondo races but only bike tours with timed sections. Since 2016, the Gran Fondo Boyaca Mundial is being held inside the department of Boyaca. An updated list can be found on Gran Fondo Guide

Denmark

In Denmark, Gran Fondo Copenhagen was held in 2014 and 2015 until it got cancelled in 2016.

Dubai

The Dubai Gran Fondo was held for a few years but cancelled in 2016. The Dubai 92 cycle challenge is UCI Grand Fondo-approved for 2016.

France

Gran Fondos are called “Cyclosportive” in France and they are just as popular as the ones in Italy. The scene is considered the second strongest globally with a solid calendar of racing from March to September. Popular races include La Marmotte, Etape du Tour, Les Trois Ballons, GFNY Mont Ventoux, Kohnse.com/en/ L'Ariegiose and L'Ardechoise.

Germany

Gran Fondos in Germany are usually called “Jedermann” races. These events are generally only open to non-race license holders or those with the lowest-level license (C). As a consequence, many riders no longer obtain racing licenses but rather race Jedermann races. Some riders are organized in teams that are no less professional than elite amateur teams.

Indonesia

For the first time in 2016, a Gran Fondo was held in Indonesia on the island of Lombok. GFNY Indonesia took place on October 2, 2016, and drew 600 riders from over 30 countries.

Ireland

Long-distance bike tours like the Wicklow 200 have been popular in Ireland for many years. In recent years, some Gran Fondo events have appeared, but most of them are non-timed bike tours.

Israel

The first Israeli Gran Fondo the "Clal Health Gran Fondo", took place in April 2012. Since then it has taken place in the north and the south of Israel. In 2015 the Dead Sea Gran Fondo joined forces with the Israel Cycling Federation, the organizers of the Tour of Arad, to create the largest international road cycling event in Israel the Gran Fondo Arad Dead Sea. It takes place in the lowest point on the earth and 1,000 riders from 30 countries are expected to take part in the two-day three stage 155K km / 96.3 mile race in 2018.

Luxembourg

The Charly Gaul Cyclosportive is the oldest Gran Fondo format race in Luxembourg. In 2019, it celebrated its 30th edition. It is typically held on a hilly course through the northeastern part of Luxembourg known as the Mullerthal, towards the Ardennes low mountain range in the north of the country. Since 2008, the race has a start and finish in Echternach and takes place in early September. The 2018 edition gathered about 1200 riders for one of the two parcours lengths, 153 km and 89 km.

Since 2017, the Schleck Gran Fondo is organized with the race starting and finishing in Mondorf-les-Bains and taking the riders along the scenic Moselle river towards the hilly Little Switzerland region in the eastern parts of the country. In the 3rd edition on May 25, 2019, about 3000 riders participated in one of two parcours lengths, 155 km and 100 km.

Malaysia

A total of 400 riders from 31 countries took on the first ever GFNY Malaysia which took place on April 23, 2017. Riders were treated to a scenic course and cultural experience in host city Ipoh, capital of Perak which is just 200 km outside of Kuala Lumpur.

Mexico

GFNY Cozumel was the first Gran Fondo in 2014, followed by GFNY Mexico City. La Etapa Mexico was also a true Gran Fondo, while Gran Fondo Giro d'Italia Mexico only featured timed climbs. The so-called "Gran Fondo Mexico" is a 50 km non-timed bike tour.

Netherlands

Like Belgium, the Netherlands suffer from strict laws that have so far prevented amateur mass-participation cycling races.

Panama

Gran Fondo Panama is Central America's most popular Gran Fondo, reaching from the Pacific to the Atlantic oceans.

Philippines

Gran Fondo debuted in the Philippines in July 2014 as the "Misamisnon Gran Fondo". Since then, every July, cyclists flock to Misamis Occidental in southern Philippines and participate in a festive sporting event celebrating cycling and enjoying the legendary hospitality of Filipinos.

Poland

With the growing popularity of cycling in Eastern Europe, Poland is at the forefront of hosting Gran Fondo-type events.

Portugal

There was an increase of Granfondos (around 20 in 2019) in Portugal in the last years. Some, but not all of the Granfondo Organizers were: GranFondo Premium, Cabreira Solutions, and Bike Service.

List of 2019 Granfondo Events in Portugal: Almodôvar Cycling Challenge 2019, Algarve Granfondo, Arrábida Granfondo, Aveiro Spring Classic, Lisboa Granfondo, Montemuro Granfondo, Granfondo Raiano, Granfondo Açores (Ilha Terceira), Douro Granfondo, Lousã Granfondo, Madeira Granfondo, Gerês Granfondo, Granfondo Srª da Graça, São Mamede Granfondo (Castelo de Vide), Granfondo Serra da Estrela, Bragança Granfondo, Monção e Melgaço Granfondo, GFNY Portugal, Granfondo Aldeias do Xisto, Granfondo Tavira

Russia

The Grand Fondo Russia has debuted in 2016. In 2017 it had three distances - 30, 60 and 100 km.

Slovenia

The Franja Marathon is one of the oldest mass-participation cycling events in the world and as such, it is a true Italian-style Gran Fondo.

South Africa

One of the world's biggest Gran Fondos is the Cape Town Cycle Tour (formerly Cape Argus). The 105 km race has over 30,000 riders. Johannesburg hosts the 947 RideJoburg every year, over 94.7Km and 1400m elevation gain (the sponsor is a local radio station, hence the distance close to 95Km). Entries peaked at 25k (all individually timed with full road closure. Durban hosts the Amashova (106Km) which was a qualifier for the Gran Fondo World Champs. Other popular events include Ride for Sight (116Km), Macsteel National Classic (103Km) and Race for Victory (110Km).

South Korea

The Seorak Granfondo is oldest Granfondo in South Korea. Seorak Grandfondo is originated from the riding which 10 riders depart from the east side of Baek Bok-ryeong in the Donghae city of Gangwon Province at 5:00 am on June 5, 2010, and ride 265 km over seven hills to reach Sokcho. Nowadays, there are Granfondo course of 208 km and Mediofondo course of 105 km.

Spain

Spanish laws require full road closures to organize a fully timed Gran Fondo. Hence, many so-called Gran Fondos like Gran Fondo La Mussara are non-timed events. One of the country's classics is La Quebrantahuesos, in the Pyrenees.

Switzerland

Being a hotbed for cycling, Switzerland has always had its fair share of mass-participation cycling events. A very popular one has always been the "Radmarathon", which is a non-competitive but sometimes timed long-distance cycling event. One of the longest-standing and toughest is the Alpenbrevet featuring a series of events over the passes around Andermatt. Meanwhile, competitive races have been rarer due to strict Swiss laws. The former legendary pro race Zuri Metzgete used to have an all-comers race attached to the event. Since the pro race has become defunct, the mass-participation event has also struggled to survive. Gran Fondo San Gottardo is the only event with the name "Gran Fondo" in it. While it is held in the Italian-speaking part of Switzerland (Ticino), it does not follow the rules of the Italian cycling federation for Gran Fondos because only the climbs are timed. Other noticeable cycling races that attract a large number of amateur cyclists include the Säntis Classic in Weinfelden, the Alpen Challenge in Lenzerheide or the Bodensee Radmarathon, which circumnavigates Lake Constance through Switzerland, Germany and Austria as well as the Cyclotour du Léman which circumnavigates Lake Geneva through Switzerland and France. The Marmotte Valais - organised by Tour des Stations- features races with the highest one day height differences.

Ukraine

The first "Gran Fondo Ukraine" was organized in 2017 year by Lviv Bicycle Club. Race has two distance 90 and 120 km and starts from Staryi Sambir town at the West of Ukraine.

United Kingdom

The concept of Gran Fondo is still relatively new in the UK. Most endurance cycling events are timed bike events called "Sportive", and rarely exclude vehicle traffic. Held across the UK, they continue to be very popular and attract large numbers of cyclists. Many keen UK cyclists have often preferred to travel to France or Italy for their Gran Fondo experience. However, there are now a number of cycle events that feature roads closed to traffic and chip timing. They include the Tour of Cambridgeshire, Ride London, Velothon Wales, Etape Caledonia and L'Etape Wales by Le Tour de France .

United States

In the United States, the term “Gran Fondo” refers to both traditional Italian Gran Fondo events where the course is closed and timed from start to finish, such as Gran Fondo New York, as well as numerous modified Gran Fondo events that take place on open roads where riders must adhere to traffic rules, some with timed sections rather than fully timed courses. Examples of these Gran Fondos include the Gran Fondo National Series (GFNS), and Gran Fondo New Jersey.

The popularity of Gran Fondos has increased rapidly in the U.S. with large numbers of cyclists at several of the top events. While many of these are not cycling marathons in the Italian tradition but are rather modified Gran Fondos, these events are designed to provide competitive and experiential elements for both professional and recreational cyclists. In most Gran Fondo series, participants do not need a USA cycling license to ride. US Gran Fondo riders can compete for an official USA Cycling Gran Fondo National Championship.

Uruguay

The first-ever Gran Fondo in Uruguay was GFNY Uruguay, held in 2016 in Punta del Este. Later that year, Gran Fondo Schneck near Montevideo was a mere bike tour.

Vietnam

The first ever Gran Fondo in Vietnam is the Coupe De Hue Gran Fondo, held for the first time in August 2018 and will feature on the UCI World Cycling For All Calendar in September 2019.

== Courses ==
Gran Fondos are run on challenging courses that are usually between 120 km and 200 km, and have between 2,000 m and 4,000 m of vertical climbing. Most events also offer a shorter and easier version.

== Organization ==
Gran Fondos are run like bike races. They have lead and follow cars, judges, safety escort, police escort, as well as technical and medical assistance. Aid stations along the course replace team cars.

== Records ==
The current 100 mile【160.93 km】 Gran Fondo course record is held by Kyle Perry with a time of 3:42:55 at the Rollfast Gran Fondo in Indianapolis, IN held on September 15, 2019.

== See also ==
- Challenge riding
- Cyclosportive
- Century ride
- UCI Gran Fondo World Championships
