= 2023 UCI Gran Fondo World Championships =

Cycling championship

- Venue: Glasgow, United Kingdom
- Date: 3–6 August
- Velodrome: Perth, Scotland
- Events: 20

The 2023 UCI Gran Fondo World Championships were the culmination of a series of mass participation cycling events in the Gran Fondo/cyclosportive tradtition held across Scotland between 4 and 7 August 2023, predominantly in Perth, Scotland. Unlike the UCI Road World Championships, which are considered an elite professional event, the Gran Fondo World Championships are targeted at mass participation and cyclists not in full-time professional teams, uniting amateurs and retired professionals, dedicated club cyclists and age-group competitors.

Qualification for the World Championships was achieved through participation in the 2023 UCI Gran Fondo World Series.

This edition was the first time the Gran Fondo World championships were held together with the elite road racing championships as part of the inaugural 2023 UCI Cycling World Championships. Medals were awarded in road race and time trial, across age-group classifications. Older riders competed in Medio Fondo, a shorter version of the Gran Fondo.

Age group winners included several former elite professionals, most notably London 2012 road race champion Alexandr Vinokurov and Tour de France veteran Johnny Hoogerland, while Atlanta 1996 road race and multiple road and track cycling world champion Jeannie Longo won the time trial championship in her age class (W65-69).

== Results ==
=== Men ===
Road race

Event	Gold	Silver	Bronze
Gran Fondo; Age 19-34	Lars van Coppenolle; Belgium	Matteo Cigala; Italy	Matthias Studer; Switzerland
Gran Fondo; Age 35-39	Wojciech Szczepanik; Poland	Fabio Porco; Belgium	Stefan Kirchmair; Austria
Gran Fondo; Age 40-44	Johnny Hoogerland; Netherlands	Jeppe Tolboll; Denmark	Carlo Porco; Belgium
Gran Fondo; Age 45-49	Jone Ellingsen; Norway	Carlos Brito; Portugal	Peter Verstraete; Belgium
Gran Fondo; Age 50-54	Alexander Vinokurov; Kazakhstan	Raul Patino; Spain	Adrian Jach; Poland
Gran Fondo; Age 55-59	Michael Schaefer; Germany	Lieven van der Perre; Belgium	Pascal Herve; Canada
Medio Fondo; Age 60-64	Jørn Fjeldavlie; Norway	Rob Pears; Great Britain	Mike Twelves; Great Britain
Medio Fondo; Age 65-69	Sylvan Adams; Israel	Arnaldo Salazar; Venezuela	Ron Paffen; Netherlands
Medio Fondo; Age 70-74	Liberto Correas; France	Bernard Siguenza; France	Luciano Metxelena; Spain
Medio Fondo; Age 74-79	André Petipas; France	John Horsburgh; Australia	Rob Stones; Great Britain
Medio Fondo; Age 80-84	James McDonald; United States	John Jones; Great Britain	Robert McGowan; Great Britain

Time Trial

Event	Gold	Silver	Bronze
Gran Fondo time trial Age 19-34	Guillaume Saye; Belgium	Espen Helgesen; Norway	Will Lowden; Great Britain
Gran Fondo time trial Age 35-39	Michele Paonne; Liechtenstein	Wojciech Szczepanik; Poland	Jonny Allen; Great Britain
Gran Fondo time trial Age 40-44	Simon Wilson; Great Britain	Paul Kennedy; Ireland	Jeppe Tolboll; Denmark
Gran Fondo time trial Age 45-49	Andy Critchlow; Great Britain	Jone Ellingsen; Norway	Matthew Smith; Great Britain
Gran Fondo time trial Age 50-54	Girts Vivers; Latvia	Raul Patino; Portugal	Richard Brook; Great Britain
Gran Fondo time trial Age 55-59	Richard Oakes; Great Britain	Michael Schaefer; Germany	Robert Nunes; Costa Rica
Gran Fondo time trial Age 60-64	Kevin Tye; Great Britain	Brendan Sullivan; United States	Mike Twelves; Great Britain
Gran Fondo time trial Age 65-69	Sylvan Adams; Israel	Javier Benet Fabregas; Spain	L Painter; United States
Gran Fondo time trial Age 70-74	Paul Mowery; United States	Gilles Pellet; France	Johann Taucher; Austria
Gran Fondo time trial Age 75-79	Andre Petipas; France	Ed Chamberlain; United States	John Horsburgh; Australia
Gran Fondo time trial Age 80-84	Marcel Eve; France	Robert McGowan; Great Britain	Herbert Lackner; Austria
Gran Fondo time trial Age 85-89	Brian Lewis; Great Britain		

=== Women ===
Road race

Event	Gold	Silver	Bronze
Gran Fondo; Age 19-34	Emily Proud; Great Britain	Marine Lenehen; Ireland	Michelle Gagnon; Canada
Gran Fondo; Age 35-39	Wies de Jong; Netherlands	Kim Knaeps; Belgium	Petra Pasar; Slovenia
Gran Fondo; Age 40-44	Mary Wilkinson; Great Britain	Claudia Sutter; Switzerland	Lina Cepak; Slovenia
Gran Fondo; Age 45-49	Ils van der Moeren; Belgium	Esta Bovill; Canada	Helen Jackson; Great Britain
Medio Fondo; Age 50-54	Amy Phillips; United States	Jutta Stienen; Switzerland	Michela Gorini; Italy
Medio Fondo; Age 55-59	Annick van Leuven; Belgium	Ina Pfuhler; Germany	Julie Rae; Ireland
Medio Fondo; Age 60-64	Suzie Godart; Luxembourg	Lillian Pfluke; United States	Marianne Hald; Denmark
Medio Fondo; Age 65-69	Linda Dewhurst; Great Britain	Jeannie Longo; France	Kathryn Churchill; Great Britain
Medio Fondo; Age 70-74	Vanessa Cooney; United States	Gisele Thureau; France	Mary Cullen; New Zealand

Time Trial

Event	Gold	Silver	Bronze
Gran Fondo time trial Age 19-34	Jessica Rhodes-Jones; Great Britain	Lisanne Heemskerk-Immerzeel; Netherlands	Laura Simenc; Slovenia
Gran Fondo time trial Age 35-39	Kimberley Miller; Germany	Laura Tibitanzl; Germany	Jenny Asplund; Sweden
Gran Fondo time trial Age 40-44	Anna Rzasowska; Poland	Jennifer George; Great Britain	Rebecca Seal; Great Britain
Gran Fondo time trial Age 45-49	Sonja Moi; Norway	Jeannie Blakemore; New Zealand	Naomi de Pennington; Great Britain
Gran Fondo time trial Age 50-54	Adelheid Schutz; Germany	Molly van Houweling; United States	Marijke de Smedt; Belgium
Gran Fondo time trial Age 55-59	Angela Carpenter; Great Britain	Elin Gronvik; Norway	Ivana Cicchelli; Australia
Gran Fondo time trial Age 60-64	Sarah Matthews; Great Britain	Ruth Clemence; United States	Andrea Nightingale; Great Britain
Gran Fondo time trial Age 65-69	Jeannie Longo; France	Linda Dewhurst; Great Britain	Diane Schleicher; United States
Gran Fondo time trial Age 70-74	Mary Cullen; New Zealand	Vannesa Cooney; United States	Gisele Thureau; France
Gran Fondo time trial Age 80-85	Sarah Powers; United States		

== Medal table ==
After 42 events

2023 UCI Gran Fondo World Championships medal table
Rank	Nation	Gold	Silver	Bronze	Total
1	Great Britain (GBR)*	11	5	13	29
2	United States (USA)	5	6	2	13
3	France (FRA)	5	4	1	10
4	Belgium (BEL)	4	3	3	10
5	Germany (GER)	3	3	0	6
5	Norway (NOR)	3	3	0	6
7	Netherlands (NED)	2	1	1	4
7	Poland (POL)	2	1	1	4
9	Israel (ISR)	2	0	0	2
10	New Zealand (NZL)	1	1	1	3
11	Kazakhstan (KAZ)	1	0	0	1
11	Latvia (LAT)	1	0	0	1
11	Liechtenstein (LIE)	1	0	0	1
11	Luxembourg (LUX)	1	0	0	1
15	Ireland (IRL)	0	2	1	3
15	Spain (ESP)	0	2	1	3
15	Switzerland (SUI)	0	2	1	3
18	Portugal (POR)	0	2	0	2
19	Australia (AUS)	0	1	2	3
19	Canada (CAN)	0	1	2	3
19	Denmark (DEN)	0	1	2	3
22	Italy (ITA)	0	1	1	2
23	Venezuela (VEN)	0	1	0	1
24	Austria (AUT)	0	0	3	3
24	Slovenia (SLO)	0	0	3	3
26	Costa Rica (CRC)	0	0	1	1
26	Sweden (SWE)	0	0	1	1
Totals (27 entries)		42	40	40	122
