= L'Étape du Tour =

Cyclosportive event

L'Étape du Tour de France (also called L'Étape du Tour or just L'Étape) is an organised mass participation cyclosportive that allows amateur cyclists to race over the same route as a Tour de France stage. First held in 1993, and now organised by the Amaury Sport Organisation (ASO), it takes place each July, normally on a Tour rest day. From 2025, a L'Étape du Tour will also take place alongside Tour de France Femmes.

Most often the stage chosen for L'Étape du Tour is the queen stage of the Tour de France, which normally is a high mountain stage in either the Pyrenees or French Alps. 15,000 entries are being sold by the organizers, with many participants travelling from foreign countries to compete. The event takes place on roads closed by the police to other traffic, with refreshment stops, mechanical assistance, and medical support provided along the route.

International versions of L'Étape, marketed under the name Étape by Tour de France series, are held annually in various countries around the world to give local riders a Tour de France-like experience. Events are currently being staged in Australia, Bolivia, Brazil, Canada, China, Colombia, Cyprus, Czech Republic, Ecuador, Greece, Indonesia, Malaysia, Mexico, Netherlands, Norway, Romania, Slovenia, Spain, and the USA.

== All male winners ==
- 1993 – Christophe Rinero. Rinero went on to finish 4th at the 1998 Tour de France.
- 1994 – Igor Pavlov. This edition was poorly coordinated and a number of incidents including cows standing in the middle of the road on the Tourmalet were reported.
- 1995 – Thierry Bourguignon. There was tragedy in this event as young cyclist Sylvain Chaigneau died on the descent of the Croix De Fer.
- 1996 – Frédéric Bessy. Bessy went on to ride in the professional peloton and won the 2004 GP Lugano in Switzerland. He retired in 2007.
- 1997 – Patrick Bruet. The man who finished second, Grzegorz Gwiazdowski, arrived late and set off ten minutes behind everyone else and he technically was the real time winner
- 1998 – Joe Doran, an Australian cyclist racing in France. For security reasons the organisers held two qualifying heats on 3 and 10 May.
- 1999 – Cyril Bastière. There were no qualifying heats this time and the police helped with organization which made the race much safer.
- 2000 – Igor Pavlov. Pavlov recorded his second win at the Étape. Some very well known cyclists rode the event including Greg LeMond, Éric Boyer, Bruno Cornillet, Atle Kvålsvoll, François Lemarchand, Ronan Pensec and Jérôme Simon. The race finished on Mont Ventoux
- 2001 – Igor Pavlov. Pavlov got a back to back victory and his third victory at the Étape.
- 2002 – Laurent Marcon. Astonishingly, there was a high rate of finishers. 7,108 finished from 7,500 starters. Nearly 95% of people finished.
- 2003 – Loic Herbreteau. Really hot temperatures made some of the climbs unbearable. Spanish cycling legends, Miguel Induráin and Abraham Olano, both competed.
- 2004 – Jean-Christophe Currit. It was the longest route ever. French cycling legend Raymond Poulidor started the race. Abraham Olano competed for the second year in succession.
- 2005 – Laurent Marcon. Marcon took his second victory at the Étape. 8500 people entered the Étape.
- 2006 – Blaise Sonnery. Sonnery went on to ride for Ag2r–La Mondiale He rode for them until 2009.
- 2007 – Nicolas Fritsch. Fritsch was a former professional peloton rider and he rode for Marc Madiot on the Française Des Jeux team. Olano and LeMond competed in the event once more.
- 2008 – Laurent Four. It was extremely cloudy which prevented the riders from seeing the sights of the race.
- 2009 – Dimitri Champion. Dimitri Champion was racing for Bretagne–Schuller at the time and he was also the French national road race champion. It was an extremely hot day with many riders having to dismount on Mont Ventoux because of the heat.
- 2010 – Jean-Christophe Currit. Currit took his second Étape victory. The race finished on the Col Du Tourmalet. 10,000 people entered the race.
- 2011 – There was a change in 2011 and a two-day race occurred rather than just the one day.
  - Stage one Jean-Christophe Currit. Currit took the first stage which went over the Col Du Galibier and finished at the Alpe d'Huez.
  - Stage two Lilian Jégou Jégou was a former professional peloton rider who retired the previous at Bretagne–Schuller. He had previously ridden for Française des Jeux for a number of years. Heavy rain meant poor conditions and only 2094 people crossed the line at the end.
- 2012 – Once more a two-day event
  - Stage one Robin Cattet. A day of high climbing with a lack of preparation hindered many participants.
  - Stage two Nicolas Roux. As it was Bastille day it was a day of celebration. Frenchmen Nicolas Roux took the victory. Rain meant the sights of the Pyrenees couldn't be seen.
- 2013 – Nicolas Roux. Back to the original one day format. Roux took a second Étape win. Climbed up to Annecy Semnoz for the win. 11,475 started which is the best ever participation. Over 10,000 finished.
- 2014 – Loic Herbreteau. Eleven years after his first Étape victory, Herbreteau struck again beating Peter Pouly by nearly four minutes. Former winner Lilian Jégou was sixth and Nicolas Roux, 2013 winner, finished sixteenth. Former professional rider Julien Belgy finished 44th. 2008 Winner Laurent Four finished 133rd
- 2015 – Jérémy Bescond. Former Cofidis rider Bescond won the race. Former winner Lillian Jegou finished 74th.
- 2016 – French rider Tao Quéméré won this year's race.
- 2017 – This years edition was won by Norwegian rider Jonas Abrahamsen.
- 2018 – French rider Victor Lafay took the victory. He went on to win the 8th stage of the 2021 Giro d'Italia.
- 2019 – Cédrick Dubois claimed this year's victory.
- 2022 – Stefan Kirchmair from Austria took the victory in the 2022 edition.
- 2023 – Artus Jaladeau from France won this year's race.
- 2024 – French rider Damien Jeanjean took the victory.

== Recent Étapes du Tour ==
=== 2007 ===
Greg LeMond rode this Étape along with his son, after being inspired by his son riding it previously. LeMond said "I had the time of my life", despite getting "650th place" and being "impressed that I even finished". "I decided that day that nobody's going to keep me from cycling, not Trek, not Armstrong, not Verbuggen, not anybody.". British comedian Hugh Dennis also rode this Étape.

=== 2008 ===
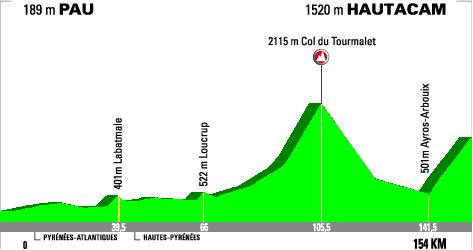
2008 Tour de France Stage 10 profile

In 2008, the 167 km stage 10 from Pau to Hautacam, including a passage over the 2,114 metres (6,936 ft) Col du Tourmalet was selected for L'Étape du Tour with Laurent Four coming home in the fastest time of 5 hours 38 minutes. Unfortunately, the weather on the day was very poor and visibility at the summit of the Tourmalet was down to 10m.

=== 2009 ===
The 2009 edition started in Montélimar (Drôme) and covered 172 km and four smaller climbs (Côte de Citelle, Col d'Ey, Col de Fontaube, Col de Notre-Dame des Abeilles) before finishing at the summit of Mont Ventoux.

=== 2010 ===
The 2010 event started in Pau and finished at the Col du Tourmalet on 18 July 2010. Nearly 7000 cyclists completed the event, thanks to weather far better than the pros had several days later.

=== 2011 ===
For 2011, ASO organised two "Étapes". The first, on 11 July, on the Modane – Alpe d'Huez stage covering 109 km, was the shortest in history. This is the same stage the pros rode in Stage 19 on 22 July. The second Étape for 2011, on 17 July, was actually the longest in history, covering 208 km, from Issoire to Saint Flour in the massif central (south of Clermont-Ferrand). The pros rode this stage on 10 July in Stage 9 of the 2011 Tour de France. The second Etape in 2011 was also the most attritional, with hailstones, rain and sub-zero temperatures in places. Only 2,094 people finished.

=== 2012 ===
In 2012 there were two events. The first event was from Albertville to La Toussuire on 8 July, following the 140 km route of stage 11 of the Tour de France and including the Col de la Madeleine and the Col de la Croix de Fer, finishing at La Toussuire, part of the Les Sybelles ski area. The second event held on 14 July followed the route of stage 16 from Pau to Bagnères-de-Luchon, crossing the Col d'Aubisque, Col du Tourmalet, Col d'Aspin, and Col de Peyresourde for a total distance of 197 km. Only about 60% of entrants finished either event within the official cut-off times.

=== 2013 ===
ASO reverted to a single event for 2013 partly because the 2012 event lost money due to logistics associated with deploying buses and trucks to recover riders who were unable to finish. On 7 July, the Étape recreated stage 20 of the 2013 Tour de France, starting in the town of Annecy and finishing at the ski station of Annecy-Semnoz at an altitude of 1,655m. The 130 km route included the climb of the 1,142m des Prés and the 1,463m Mont Revard.

=== 2014 ===
The 2014 event on 20 July 2014 followed a similar route to the 2008 event, beginning in Pau and finishing at Hautacam.

=== 2015 ===
The 2015 route began in the Savoie town of Saint-Jean-de-Maurienne, and covered a 140 km course, climbing the Col de Chaussy, Col de la Croix de Fer, Col du Mollard, with a summit finish at La Toussuire.

=== 2016 ===
In 2016, the event began in Megève and ended in Morzine in the Haute Savoie. The race was shortened to 122 km and three mountain passes after Col de la Ramaz had to be skipped due to rockfall danger on the descent. 11,471 participants set off from Megève to climb the 1,487m Col des Aravis, the 1,618m Col de la Colombière and the 1,691m Col de Joux Plane. A record 11,212 finishers reached Megève. The winner was Tao Quemere in 3h33'35" and the first woman was Edwige Pitel in 3h56'37".

=== 2017 ===
The 2017 event, held on 16 July, followed a nearly identical route to what was used four days later for Stage 18 of the 2017 Tour de France. Both L'Étape and the Tour's Stage 18 started in Briançon and ended atop the 2,360m Col d'Izoard, with L'Étape listed as 181 km and Stage 18 as 179.5 km.

=== 2018 ===
L'Étape du Tour 2018 was held on 8 July and featured a 169 km route from Annecy to Le Grand-Bornand, taking in four significant climbs, and totalling around 3500m of vertical ascent.

=== 2019 ===
The 2019 edition was held on 21 July on the course of stage 20 of the Tour de France of the same year. The 135 km route from Albertville to Val Thorens featured 4,563m of climbing up to Cormet de Roselend (Catégorie 1), Côte de Longefoy (Catégorie 2), and the final climb to Val Thorens (Hors Catégorie). The actual Tour de France stage six days later had to be cut short to just 59 km, due to a heavy hailstorm that caused landslides the day before.

=== 2020 and 2021 ===
The 2020 event, which was set to follow the route of stage 2 of the 2020 Tour de France from Nice to Nice, had to be cancelled due to the COVID-19 pandemic. The organizers attempted to run the same route in 2021, but ultimately this plan also had to be cancelled due to the COVID-19 pandemic.

=== 2022 ===
The 30th edition of L'Étape du Tour took place on 10 July 2022 on the same route as stage 12 of the Tour de France between Briançon and Alpe d'Huez over 167 km with more than 4,700m of climbing, including the Col du Galibier (Hors Catégorie), Col de la Croix de Fer (Hors Catégorie), and the final climb to Alpe d'Huez (Hors Catégorie). In the COVID-19 aftermath only 11,000 riders out of 16,000 inscriptions showed up at the starting line, and 8,685 finished within the official time limit, with many suffering in temperatures exceeding 40°C.

=== 2023 ===
The 31st edition of L'Étape du Tour was held on 9 July 2023 on the same route as stage 14 of the Tour de France between Annemasse and Morzine over 157 km with more than 4,100m of climbing, including the Col de Saxel (Catégorie 3),Col de Cou (Catégorie 1), Col de Feu (Catégorie 1), Col de la Ramaz (Catégorie 1), and Col de Joux Plane (Hors Catégorie).

=== 2024 ===
The 2024 L'Étape du Tour was held on 6 July 2024 on the course of stage 20 of the Tour de France, starting in Nice, a 138 km route with more than 4,600m of climbing, including the Col de Braus (Catégorie 2), Col de Turini (Catégorie 1), Col de La Colmiane (Catégorie 1), and finishing on Col de la Couillole (Catégorie 1).

=== 2025 ===
From 2025, two editions of L'Étape du Tour will take place – one that uses the same route as stage 19 of the Tour de France (Albertville to La Plagne) on 20 July 2025, and another that will use the same route as stage 8 of the Tour de France Femmes (Chambéry to Col de la Madeleine) on 2 August 2025.
