= Fred Whitton Challenge =

Charity cyclosportive event

The Fred Whitton Challenge is a charity cyclosportive event held annually in the English Lake District, in aid of Macmillan Cancer Support, Cumbria's air ambulances, the mountain rescue service and various youth cycling projects. It is held in memory of Fred Whitton, racing secretary of the Lakes Road Club, who died of cancer at the age of 50 in 1998. The event started in 1999 and has been held every year since, except for 2001 and 2020 when it was cancelled due to the foot-and-mouth epidemic and the international COVID-19 pandemic respectively.

The event has raised over £2,000,000 (two million pounds) and is Macmillan's biggest fundraiser in Cumbria.

Starting and finishing in Grasmere, the route is 183 kilometres (114 mi) long, with 3,500 metres (11,500 ft) elevation gain. 2,500 riders take part in the challenge. The route heads for Ambleside, before crossing Kirkstone Pass. It descends through Glenridding, on the shore of Ullswater, before heading for Keswick. It then crosses Honister Pass, before reaching Buttermere and climbing Newlands Pass. From here, the route takes in Whinlatter Pass out of Braithwaite. Riders then head south down the Western Lake District, including climbing Cold Fell out of Ennerdale Bridge. Finally, the route turns eastward towards the finish, taking riders through Eskdale, crossing the famous Hardknott and Wrynose Passes (after almost 161 kilometres (100 mi) of riding) and then past Blea Tarn, down through Langdale to the finish in Grasmere.

== See also ==
- Cyclosportive
- Challenge riding
