= Cyclosportive =

Cycling event

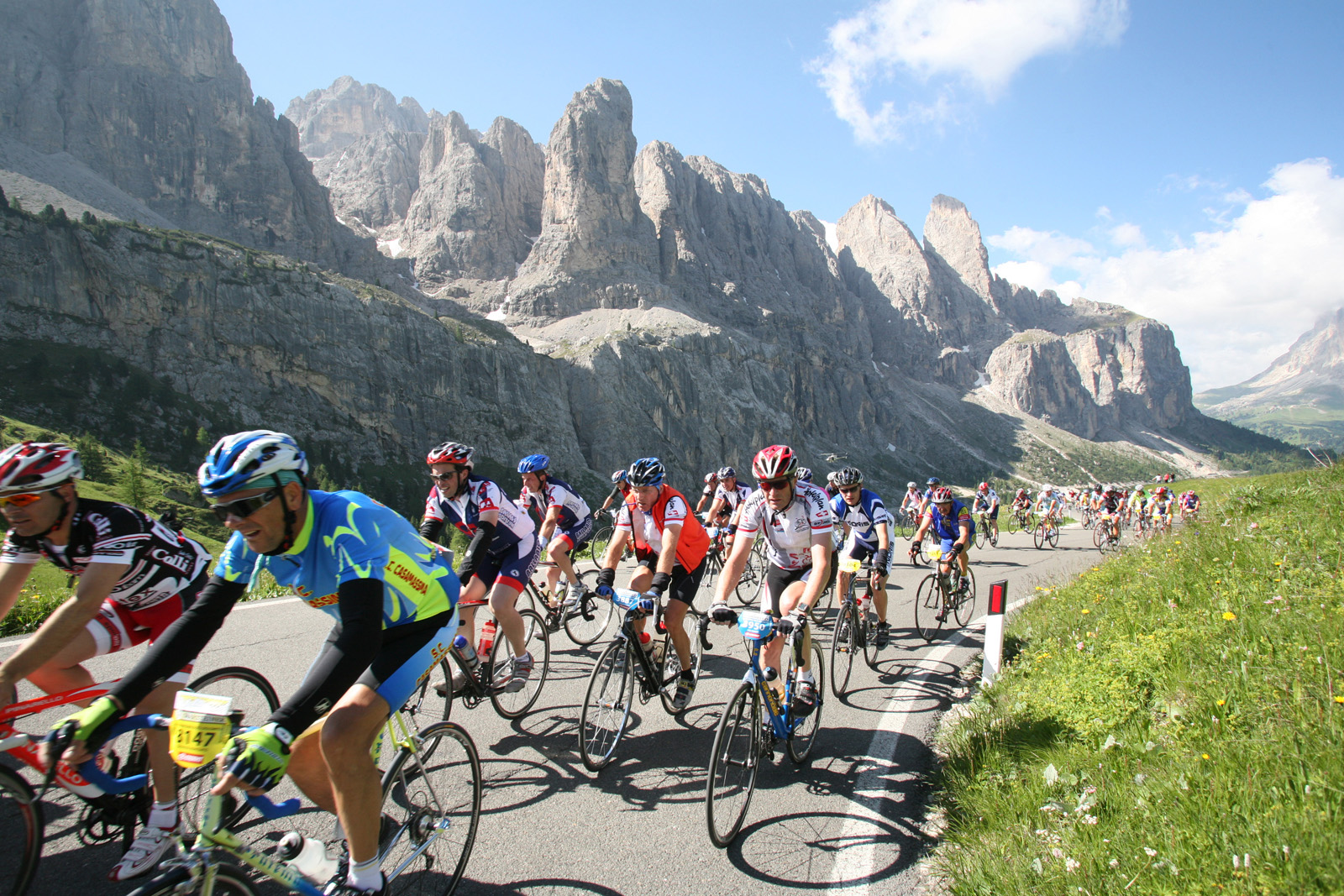
The Maratona dles Dolomites

A cyclosportive, or often simply sportive, is a short to long distance, organised, mass-participation cycling event, typically held annually. The Italian term Gran Fondo is commonly used for these events in the United States, Australia and some other English-speaking countries.

Cyclosportive is short for the French term randonnée cyclosportive (the spelling cyclosportif is sometimes also used but cyclosportive is correct as randonnée is a feminine noun in French).

Many cyclists use sportives to challenge themselves in a personal battle against the distance and then ultimately, the clock. Some participants in a cyclosportive will ride the event like a race, with prizes awarded and considerable prestige for top place finishers, particularly in events like La Marmotte, L'Étape du Tour and the Ardechoise.

A cyclosportive falls between a traditional cycle road race and the more challenging non-competitive randonnée or Audax events. Riders normally carry a number and the time they take to complete the course is recorded. There is usually an upper time limit within which the course must be completed (unlike many randonnée events, there is no lower limit preventing riders from completing the course quickly). The already lengthy course will traditionally include climbs and difficult riding conditions, adding to the merit of the event (e.g. the cobblestones of the Paris–Roubaix).

The routes will usually be well sign-posted and/or marshalled (some cyclosportives take place on roads which have been closed to motor traffic for the duration of the event), riders will be able to use feeding stations positioned at intervals along the route to replenish their food and drink supplies and mechanical and medical support may also be provided. Some attract thousands of participants – since 2000 l'Étape du Tour has offered places to 8,500 riders each year.

== Sportive event timings ==
Although sportives are not races, entrants' times are usually recorded and sometimes riders are given their finishing position. This can encourage the fastest cyclists to push the pace, with faster riders working together to increase speed in a pro-peloton style. The majority of riders will simply be happy to complete the distance within the time allowance. It is common in France and Italy for prizes to be awarded to the winner and to those winning age-related categories. In the United Kingdom, sportives are not held as races in order to avoid strict rules governing cycle races on public roads.

== Established sportive events ==
The first ever French cyclosportive was La Marmotte, which was first run in 1982 on a route starting in Le Bourg-d'Oisans and taking in the Col de la Croix de Fer, Col du Télégraphe and Col du Galibier before climbing to finish at the top of one of the most famous Tour de France climbs at Alpe d'Huez. It remains one of the most popular cyclosportive events today in Europe and is often considered to be the hardest cyclosportive.

Arguably the most famous of the cyclosportives today is the French l'Étape du Tour, held each July over a stage of that particular year's Tour de France, usually a mountain stage. This over-subscribed event sees approximately 7,500 riders attempting to emulate the professional cyclists. The Ardéchoise is one of Europe's largest event with 15,000 riders taking part but this time participants are able to choose from a range of circuits, from 66 km to 268 km. The Tour of Flanders had 18,000 participants in its 2007 edition and 17,000 in 2008. Riders can also choose from different circuits including mountainbike courses, from 28 km to 256 km. These events often enjoy roads closed to traffic for the duration of the event, allowing riders to enjoy the full width of the road and to profit from the often technical sections of the route.

Another coveted French event, the Paris–Roubaix Challenge, mimics the legendary one-day classic Paris–Roubaix. Held bi-annually, this 260 km (160 mi) sportive increases the test of reliability and endurance yet further with 26 sections of pavé which total some 42 km (26 miles). It is not uncommon for riders to break bikes and even bones over these cobbled roads. Other notable events are the Cape Argus Cycle Tour in South Africa which celebrated its 30th year in 2007 with 40,000 entrants and Italy's Maratona dles Dolomites.

The largest open road cyclosportive in the UK is the Verenti Dragon Ride Wales, held each June over a challenging 200 km mountainous course in South Wales. There are three UK cyclosportives held on closed roads: the annual Etape Caledonia which attracted some 3,500 cyclists in its 2009 edition, follows a route around the Perthshire highlands; the Etape Cymru, first held in October 2011 on North Wales roads including the Horseshoe Pass; and the Prudential RideLondon-Surrey 100 through central London and the Surrey countryside, which in its inaugural run in 2013 was completed by nearly 16,000 riders, and by over 20,000 the next year.

Cyclosportives that are longer than 300 km fit the criteria for ultra-distance cycling events. Although the Milan–San Remo cyclosportive proclaims itself to be the "longest Granfondo in the world", it is only 296 kilometres (184 mi) long and there are several others that are longer. Bordeaux–Paris was a professional race until 1988 and returned in 2014 as a cyclosportive with a route of about 610 kilometres (380 mi). The Tour du Mont Blanc is a 330 kilometres (210 mi) long cyclosportive over mountainous terrain through France, Switzerland, and Italy. Slightly longer still is the Wysam 333 in Switzerland at 333 kilometres (207 mi). There is also the Vätternrundan cyclosportive that does a tour of the Swedish lake, which is a route that measures 315 kilometres (196 mi).

In New Zealand, there is the Lake Taupo Cycle Challenge. The standard cyclosportive option involves a single lap of the lake, which is 160 kilometres (99 mi) long, but there are also options to do two laps in one day for 320 kilometres (200 mi), with no support on the first lap, or start one day earlier and do four laps, 640 kilometres (400 mi), which is more of a randonneuring event. Every second year there is also an 8 lap option, 1,280 kilometres (800 mi) long, but a following support vehicle is required for that version making it an ultracycling event.

== Examples of notable cyclosportives ==
- Australia
  - Around the Bay in a Day
  - Audax Alpine Classic
- Belgium
  - Tour of Flanders
  - Liège–Bastogne–Liège
- Italy
  - Granfondo Milano–Sanremo
  - Milano–Torino
  - Gran Piemonte
  - Giro di Lombardia
  - L'Eroica – vintage themed cyclosportive
  - Maratona dles Dolomites
- Finland
  - Tour de Helsinki
- France
  - l'Étape du Tour.
  - La Marmotte.
  - Time-Megeve-Mont-Blanc
- Greece
  - The Tour of Crete
- Ireland
  - Wicklow 200
- New Zealand
  - Lake Taupo Cycle Challenge
- Norway
  - Styrkeprøven
- South Africa
  - Pick 'n Pay Cape Argus Cycle Tour
  - 94.7 Cycle Challenge
  - Herald Cycle Tour
  - Pick n Pay Fast One
  - Amashova Durban Classic Race
- Spain
  - Quebrantahuesos
- Sweden
  - Vätternrundan
- United Kingdom
  - Etape du Dales
  - Fred Whitton Challenge
  - Great Manchester Cycle
  - Tour Pour La Mer
  - Prudential RideLondon-Surrey 100
- United States
  - King Ridge GranFondo
  - Sea Otter Classic

== See also ==
- Brevet or Randonnée
- Challenge riding
- UCI Golden Bike
- Century ride
- Gran Fondo
