= Melbourne to Warrnambool Classic =

One-day cycling race

Melbourne to Warrnambool
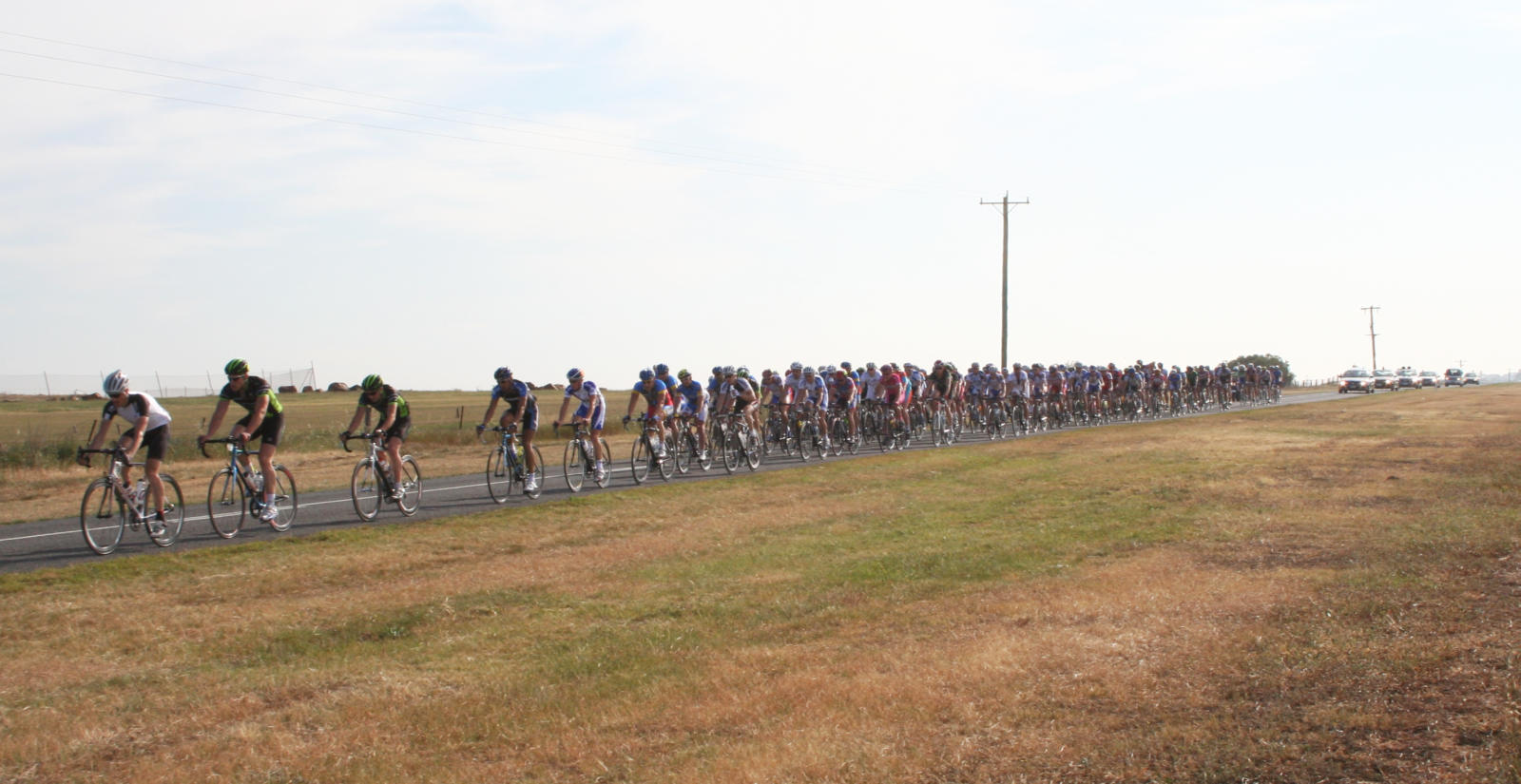
- Riders in the 2007 race, near Werribee on the outskirts of Melbourne Riders in the 2007 race, near Werribee on the outskirts of Melbourne

General
Established	1895
Held	October
Country	Australia
Region	South West Victoria
Type	One day classic

Data
Editions	104
First Winner	Andrew Calder (NZ)
Most Recent	Mark O'Brien (AUS), Lucinda Stewart (AUS)
Most Wins	P.Besanko, D. Allan, 3 times
Record Time	5 hours and 12 minutes by Dean Woods in 1990 (267 km)

The Melbourne to Warrnambool Classic cycling race is a one-day road bicycle race. The race started in 1895 and is Australia's oldest one day race and the world's second oldest one day race, after the Liège–Bastogne–Liège Classic. Historically until 1938 the race started in Warrnambool and finished 165 miles (266 km) later in Melbourne. In 1895 the race was run in the opposite direction, from Melbourne to Warrnambool and then again from 1939. The route started in the Melbourne central business district and followed the Princes Highway to Warrnambool on Victoria's western coast. This traditional route was the longest race on the Union Cycliste Internationale (UCI) calendar, the exact distance varying slightly over time.

The race was a handicap event from 1895 to 1995, with riders leaving Melbourne at different intervals. From 1996 the race has been conducted as a Scratch Race with a mass start with up to 250 entrants, categorized into A, B, C, and D grades over a distance of 267 kilometres (166 mi). In 2004 it was changed to 299.1 kilometres (185.9 mi). In the towns on route there are now sprint points to be earned for a sprint champion competition. With six climbs during the day, a King of the Mountains championship is also at stake.

While the race usually attracts Australia's best locally based road cyclists, the increasing number of Australians racing for European-based professional teams have rarely entered since 2010. The race is also open to amateur club cyclists who race for the prizes in the secondary grades, or just to finish before the designated cutoff time.

In 2009 the race start was shifted to Werribee, on Melbourne's outer south-western outskirts, and the race distance shortened to 258 kilometres (160 mi). Several additional hills were added to the route near Camperdown. The primary difficulty of the race remains its length and the strong crosswinds which affect the course. There was no race in 2018 as the event moved from its October date in 2017 to be held in February 2019. The course was also changed, starting at Avalon Airport, through Geelong, Winchelsea, Colac and Port Campbell, before finishing in Warrnambool.

== History ==
In 1895 Don Charlston conceived the first race after riding from Warrnambool to Melbourne in a personal time trial. The first race was held on 5 October 1895 and won by New Zealander Andrew Calder in 11 hours 44 minutes, with a two-hour handicap start for the 165-mile trip. He suffered a puncture near Geelong which lost him 20 minutes, but crossed the line with a lead of 31 minutes. The fastest time during this first race was recorded by Jim Carpenter from scratch who took 10 hours 52 minutes and finished in 4th place. Of the 50 riders that entered, 24 started and only 7 finished the race. A second race occurred ten weeks later over the same distance.

From 1901 to 1939 the title of Long Distance Road Champion of Australasia was awarded with the Blue Riband to the fastest time over the full distance of 165 miles (266 km). Riders attended from all over Australia and New Zealand. From 1902 the fastest NSW rider in the Goulburn to Sydney Classic was selected to appear for NSW. In 1923 a sprint point was introduced for the first 100 miles (160 km). The first winner was Jack Beasley from Fitzroy in what was claimed as a world record time of 4h 37' 57".

In 1927 the Warrnambool to Melbourne was replaced by the Dunlop Grand Prix, a 690.5 miles (1,111.3 km) race over four stages, with the 4th stage being from Warrnambool to Melbourne. In 1934 the Warrnambool to Melbourne was again replaced by a stage race, the Centenary 1000, a 1,102 miles (1,773 km) race over seven stages, with the 1st stage being from Melbourne to Warrnambool.

In 1946, the first year following the end of the second World War, the Warrnambool to Melbourne was replaced by the Victorian Cycling Grand Prix held over 195 miles (314 km) from Bendigo to Melbourne, the longest and richest one day event held in Australia that year.

From 1947 to 1949 the title of 150-mile Professional Road Champion of Australia was awarded at a sprint point 150 miles (240 km) into the Warrnambool to Melbourne. From 1950 the Australian national road race title was run as a separate event.

Olympic medal winning cyclist, Dean Woods, set the race record time of 5 hours and 12 minutes in 1990 over the shorter distance than the race is presently 267 kilometres (166 mi) in 1990.

In 1995 a monument commemorating the race winners was unveiled near the finish line on Raglan Parade, Warrnambool by two times Blue Riband Winner, Sir Hubert Opperman. An honour board was added in 2001 in acknowledgement of the many volunteers involved in the race.

The first woman known to have entered the race was Pauline Walters in 1979. She did not complete the race on her first attempt, but in 1980 Walters and Beryl Burton became the first two women to finish the race. In 2015, the Melbourne to Warrnambool established a separate category for female entrants in an effort by Cycling Victoria to make cycling more female friendly. In 2022, a separate women's race, the Warrnambool Women's classic, was added. The inaugural Women's Warrnambool Classic in 2022 was won by Maeve Plouffe.

In 2021 the race was scheduled for 13 February. However, the day before the race it was postponed due to a snap lockdown declared by the Victorian government to control a coronavirus outbreak. The race was rescheduled to 1 May.

In 2025 it become a round in the newly founded ProVelo Super League.

=== Winners 1895–1995 ===
Winners 1895–1995
Year	Winner	Handicap	Blue Riband	Fastest Time	Ref.
1895	Andrew Calder (NZ)	2 hours	Jim Carpenter, Vic	10h 52' 0"	
1895	William Nicol	90 min	Jim Carpenter, Vic	12h 53' 0"	
1896	Jim Carpenter, Vic	scratch	Jim Carpenter, Vic	8h 40' 5"	
1897	Bill "Newhaven" Jackson, Vic	10 min	Bill "Newhaven" Jackson, Vic	9h 51' 9"	
1898	W Collins	90 min	Bill Adams, Vic	9h 8' 45"	
1901	Albert Nioa	40 min	Andy Ralston (NZ)	9h 0' 30"	
1902	Matt Chappell	55 min	HG O’Callaghan, Vic	8h 46' 23"	
1903	Jack Arnst (NZ)	scratch	Jack Arnst (NZ)	7h 43' 0"	
1904	Jack Wright	38 min	Tom Larcombe, NSW	7h 48' 7"	
1905	William Hawley, Vic	25 min	William Hawley, Vic	7h 52' 26"	
1906	DD Riley	28 min	Hermann Ellmers Mehrtens (NZ)	8h 53' 52"	
1907	Meldrum Dobie	42 min	Tom Larcombe, NSW	7h 40' 10"	
1908	JT Donohue, NSW	49 min	Matt Chappell, Vic	7h 46' 27"	
1909	W Knaggs	41 min	Iddo "Snowy" Munro, Vic	7h 12' 51"	
1910	Charles Piercey, Vic	47 min	Joe Pianta, WA	9h 30' 46"	
1911	J Tebbs	42 min	Phil O'Shea (NZ)	8h 8' 44"	
1922	Peter Hill (NZ)	32 min	Phil O'Shea (NZ)	8h 59' 8"	
1923	Percy Wells	56 min	Phil O'Shea (NZ)	7h 51' 41"	
1924	WF King (Note: WF King was 19 years old and his 44-year-old father, William A. "Buffer" King, also rode in the race, finishing 4th.)	64 min	Hubert Opperman, Vic	7h 15' 37"	
1925	Esmond Williamson	60 min	Harold K. Smith, WA	7h 25' 1"	
1926	Les Einsiedel	48 min	Hubert Opperman, Vic	7h 36' 10"	
1927	Replaced by the Dunlop Grand Prix				
1928	Not held				
1929	Horrie Marshall, WA	6 min	Hubert Opperman, Vic	8h 7' 10"	
1930	Jim Egan	52 min	Richard Lamb, Vic	8h 20' 10"	
1931	George Lessing	63 min	Matt Lynch, Vic	6h 31' 28"	
1932	Dick Reynolds	39 min	Richard Lamb, Vic	6h 21' 18"	
1933	Les Willoughby	48 min	Hefty Stuart, Vic	6h 27' 56"	
1934	Replaced by the Centenary 1000				
1935	Tom Reynolds, SA	57 min	Clinton Beasley, Vic	6h 24' 36"	
1936	Jim McEvoy, SA	43 min	Alan Angus, Vic	6h 44' 50"	
1937	T Brooks, Tas	24 min	Alan Angus, Vic	7h 19' 9"	
1938	L Rodgers, Qld	31 min	Dean Toseland, SA	6h 44' 53"	
1939	Dean Toseland, SA	scratch	Dean Toseland, SA	8h 18' 6"	
1946	Replaced by the Victorian Cycling Grand Prix				
1947	Arnie Edwards, SA	45 min	Keith Rowley, Vic	6h 57' 43"	
1948	Allan Saunders, Vic	33 Min 30 sec	Herb Guyatt, Vic	7h 9' 10"	
1949	Stan Bonney	33 min	Alby Saunders, Vic	6h 12' 10"	
1950	Max Rowley	scratch	Max Rowley	7h 53' 28"	
1951	Arthur Julius	27 min	Graham Stabell	6h 27' 3"	
1952	Vin Beasley	50 min	Graham Stabell	7h 27' 8"	
1953	Murray French	17 min	Alby Saunders, Vic	6h 8' 58"	
1954	Billy Guyatt	27 min	Don Williams	8h 11' 58"	
1955	Eddie Smith, SA	scratch	Eddie Smith, SA	6h 4' 55"	
1956	Bob Davis, WA	51 min	Russell Mockridge, Vic	5h 47' 5"	
1957	Stan Bonney	36 min	Russell Mockridge, Vic	6h 6' 12"	
1958	Wally O’Brien	46 min	George Goodwin	5h 49' 35"	
1959	G Daws	50 min	Peter Anthony	7h 30' 15"	
1960	Jack Sommer	15 min	K Stiefler	8h 32' 47"	
1961	T Robson	34 min	John O'Sullivan	6h 43' 2"	
1962	Wally O’Brien	20 min	JX McDonough	7h 11' 31"	
1963	J Binding	40 min	W Dalton	6h 9' 33"	
1964	Peter Fry	40 min	Barry Waddell, WA	6h 7' 34"	
1965	Bill Dove	28 min	Barry Waddell, WA	7h 11' 6"	
1966	L Wearne	8 min	L Wearne	7h 20' 15"	
1967	Graeme Gilmore, Tas	scratch	Graeme Gilmore, Tas	7h 14' 7"	
1968	Rodney Crowe, NSW	18 min	Barry Waddell, WA	6h 12' 33"	
1969	B Farmer	30 min	Kerry Hoole, NSW	6h 25' 16"	
1970	Mario Giramondo	46 min	K Oliver, NSW	6h 3' 25"	
1971	Bruce Clarke	20 min	Hilton Clarke	8h 36' 20"	
1972	L Sedley	13 min	Frank Atkins, Tas	7h 11' 18"	
1973	Bruce Clarke	10 min	G Wilson	6h 27' 27"	
1974	John Bylsma, Qld	5 min	John Bylsma, Qld	7h 27' 54"	
1975	Mario Giramondo	45 min	Hilton Clarke	7h 24' 24"	
1976	David Allan	scratch	David Allan	6h 38' 31"	
1977	Ian Grindlay	32 min	T Stacey	5h 53' 3"	
1978	Dennis Shaw	4 min	T Stacey	6h 46' 24"	
1979	David Allan	scratch	David Allan	7h 6' 48"	
1980	J Hine	amateur	Wayne Hildred (NZ)	5h 37' 10"	
1981	Peter Cox	10 min	David Allan	6h 16' 54"	
1982	David Allan	scratch	David Allan	6h 32' 31"	
1983	Andrew Lindsey	40 min	Terry Hammond, NSW	6h 0' 25"	
1984	Peter Besanko, Vic	scratch	Peter Besanko, Vic	6h 36' 43"	
1985	Brad Leach	30 min	Terry Hammond, NSW	6h 1' 2"	
1986	Michael Lynch, Vic	scratch	Michael Lynch, Vic	6h 36' 56"	
1987	Paul Rugari	scratch	Paul Rugari	6h 32' 50"	
1988	Barry Burns	scratch	Barry Burns	7h 18' 29"	
1989	Peter Besanko, Vic	scratch	Peter Besanko, Vic	6h 49' 19"	
1990	Robert Jordan	42 min	Dean Woods, Vic	5h 12' 26"	
1991	Andrew Stirling	scratch	Andrew Stirling	7h 15' 45"	
1992	Peter Besanko, Vic	scratch	Peter Besanko, Vic	7h 1' 28"	
1993	Dean Woods, Vic	scratch	Dean Woods, Vic	7h 36' 8"	
1994	Gavin Parsonage, WA	scratch	Gavin Parsonage, WA	7h 20' 4"	
1995	B McAuliffe	60 min	Marcel Wüst (GER)	5h 39' 27"	

=== Male Winners 1996 onwards ===
From 1996 the race was run as a scratch race.

Winners 1996 onwards
Year	Rider	Team	Time	Ref.
1996	Chris White, Vic		6h 44' 16"	
1997	Daniel Schnider (SUI)		6h 17' 54"	
1998	Bart Heirweg (BEL)		7h 20' 56"	
1999	Jamie Drew, Vic		6h 42' 51"	
2000	Hilton Clarke, Vic	Carnegie	7h 34' 36"	
2001	David McKenzie, Vic		7h 01' 55"	
2002	Jamie Drew, Vic	iTeamnova.com	6h 09' 57"	
2003	Simon Gerrans, Vic	Team Ringerike / Carnegie Caulfield CC	6h 47' 38"	
2004	William Walker	VIS / Jayco / Brunswick CC	7h 59' 22"	
2005	Jonas Ljungblad (SWE)	Amore e Vita	7h 29' 21"	
2006	Robert McLachlan	Drapac Porsche	7h 54' 15"	
2007	Tim Decker	Decked Out Coaching	7h 15' 15"	
2008	Zak Dempster	VIS / Jayco – Toyota–United	7h 18' 15"	
2009	Joel Pearson	Savings And Loans	6h 28' 25"	
2010	Rhys Pollock	Drapac Professional Cycling	7h 49' 40"	
2011	Joel Pearson	Genesys Wealth Advisers	7h 24' 14"	
2012	Floris Goesinnen (NED)	Drapac Professional Cycling	7h 00' 23"	
2013	Sam Horgan (NZL)	Team Budget Forklifts	6h 32' 12"	
2014	Oliver Kent-Spark	Search2Retain	7h 00' 21"	
2015	Scott Sunderland	Team Budget Forklifts	7h 27' 29"	
2016	Nathan Elliott	KRD Racing	6h 38' 55"	
2017	Nathan Elliott	IsoWhey Sports SwissWellness	6h 34' 23"	
2019	Nick White	Team BridgeLane	6h 15' 06"	
2020	Brendan Johnston	Team CCS Canberra	6h 16' 03"	
2021	Jensen Plowright	Team BridgeLane	6h 04' 44"	
2022	Cameron Scott	ARA Pro Racing Sunshine Coast	6h 07' 41"	
2023	Tristan Saunders	Team BridgeLane	7h 00' 17"	
2024	Mark O'Brien	Carnegie Caulfield Cycling Club	6h 24' 05"	
2025	Blake Agnoletto	Team Brennan p/b TP32	6h 19' 29"	

=== Female Winners ===
From 2015 females were awarded official prizes.

Female Winners
Year	Rider	Team	Time	Ref.
2015	Lauretta Hanson	Fearless Femme Racing	7h 50' 57"	
2016	Tessa Fabry	High5 Dream Team	7h 45' 56"	
2017	Erin Nolan	Veris Women's Racing	7h 38' 59"	
2019	Peta Mullens	Bendigo & District CC	6h 26' 22"	
2020	Matilda Raynolds	Specialized Women's Team	6h 25' 48"	
2021	Matilda Raynolds	Specialized Women's Team	6h 21' 31"	

=== Women's Warrnambool Cycling Classic Winners ===
From 2022 a separate race for women was held.

Year	Rider	Team	Time	Ref.
2022	Maeve Plouffe	ARA Pro Racing Sunshine Coast	4h 14' 52"	
2023	Sophie Edwards	ARA Skip Capital Sunshine Coast	4h 43' 02"	
2024	Lucinda Stewart	ARA Skip Capital	4h 02' 39"	
2025	Katelyn Nicholson	Butterfields Ziptrak Racing	3h 51' 37"	
