= Grafton to Inverell Classic =

Cycling race in Australia

Race details
- Date: Late April/Early May
- Region: New South Wales
- Discipline: Road
- Competition: ProVelo Super League
- Type: One-day race
- Web site: www.graftontoinverell.com.au

History
- First edition: 1961
- Editions: 62 (as of 2024)
- First winner: Alan Grindal (AUS)
- Most wins: Jamie Drew (AUS); Sean Lake (AUS); (2 wins)
- Most recent: Bentley Niquet-Olden (AUS)

The Grafton to Inverell Classic is an annual one-day road cycling race held between Grafton and Inverell in New South Wales, Australia. The race was first held in 1961, and is considered one of the most difficult and historic races in the country. The race features both open and professional races, along a 228-kilometre course. Since 2025 it has been a round in the ProVelo Super League.

== Winners ==
Year	Winner	Second	Third
1961	(Australia) Alan Grindal	(Australia) G. Garden	(Australia) T. Tolley
1962	(Australia) Phil Chapman	(Australia) G. Brown	(Australia) F. Fransen
1963	(Australia) Norman Burnell	(Australia) H. Summers	(Australia) C. Kruf
1964	(Australia) John Ferranda	(Australia) N. McDonough	(Australia) K. Long
1965	(Australia) Leon Cook	(Australia) R. Barron	(Australia) Terry Moore
1966	(Australia) Max Redman	(Australia) B. Johnson	(Australia) P. Markham
1967	(Australia) Donald Wilson	(Australia) Kevin Brindle	(Australia) D. Garrett
1968	(Australia) Kevin Morgan	(New Zealand) D. Browne	(Australia) T. Savimaki
1969	(Australia) Bruce Ryalls	(Australia) P. Littlejohn	(Australia) D. Thompson
1970	(Australia) Don Strahley	(Australia) Ted Wixen	(Australia) Terry Moore
1971	(New Zealand) Ross Bush	(New Zealand) R. Davis	(Australia) M. Kautto
1972	(Australia) Kevin Brindle	(Australia) M. Kautto	(Australia) K. Bartlett
1973	(Australia) Vince Breen	(Australia) P. Brown	(Australia) L. Roe
1974	(Australia) Brian Ferris	(Australia) R. Bates	(Australia) K. Bartlett
1975	(Australia) Bob Hines	(Australia) T. Parks	(Australia) M. Glindeman
1976	(Australia) Remo Sansonetti	(Australia) Alan Spokes	(Australia) Greg Parkes
1977	(Australia) Robert Glindeman	(Australia) G. Stone	(Australia) Rick McCorkell
1978	(Australia) Ray Riper	(Australia) H. Berkery	(New Zealand) M. McKinnell
1979	(Australia) Graham McVilly	(New Zealand) Vernon Hannaray	(New Zealand) M. Nicholls
1980	(Australia) Wayne Hammond	(Australia) Gary Hammond	(Australia) M. Blythe
1981	(Australia) Alan Gill	(Australia) G. Oliver	(Australia) Gary Brooks
1982	(New Zealand) Stephen Cox	(New Zealand) Jack Swart	(New Zealand) Blair Stockwell
1983	(Australia) Rick McCorkell	(Australia) Michael Lynch	(Australia) C. Walsh
1984	(Australia) Michael Lynch	(Italy) Eros Poli	(Australia) Robert Crossley
1985	(United Kingdom) Paul Curran	(Switzerland) Michel Ansermet	(Sweden) Lars Wahlqvist
1986	(Australia) Andrew Logan	(Australia) Ian McKenzie	(Australia) Scott Sunderland
1987	(Norway) Atle Pedersen	(Germany) Thomas Dürst	(Italy) Tiziano Mancini
1988	(Italy) Gianluca Pierobon	(Australia) Barney St. George	(Australia) Rick McCorkell
1989	(United States) Nate Reiss	(Germany) Uwe Winter	(Australia) John Groom
1990	(United Kingdom) Nigel Perry	(Australia) Glen Wilson	(Australia) David Perry
1991	(Australia) Stephen Fairless	(Australia) Justin Grindal	(Australia) Scott Steward
1992	(Australia) Billy-Joe Shearsby	(Australia) Glen Wilson	(Australia) M. Elliott
1993	(Australia) Stephen Drake	(Australia) David Perry	(Australia) T. Jordon
1994	(New Zealand) Craig Saunders	(Australia) Damien Forster	(Australia) Paul Rugari
1995	(Australia) Tim Christopher	(Australia) Wayne Kestle	(New Zealand) Craig Saunders
1996	(Australia) Damien Forster	(Australia) Duncan Smith	(New Zealand) Craig Saunders
1997	(Australia) Jamie Drew	(Australia) David McKenzie	(Australia) Ben Litchfield
1998	(Australia) Benjamin Brooks	(Australia) Steve Williams	(Australia) Hayden Bradbury
1999	(Australia) Jamie Drew	(Australia) Steve Williams	(Australia) Simon Gerrans
2000	(Australia) Benjamin Day	(Australia) Hank Vaassen	(Australia) Dennis Mungoven
2001	(Australia) David McKenzie	(Australia) Peter Milostic	(Australia) David Pell
2002	(Australia) Lee Godfrey	(Australia) Paul Redenbach	(Australia) Trent Wilson
2003	No race		
2004	(Australia) Peter McDonald	(Uruguay) Jorge Libonatti	(Australia) Richard Vollebregt
2005	(New Zealand) Greg Henderson	(Australia) Simon Clarke	(Australia) Matthew Lloyd
2006	(Australia) Robert McLachlan	(Australia) Chris Jongewaard	(Australia) Peter McDonald
2007	(Australia) Cameron Hughes	(Australia) Robert Carter	(Australia) Patrick Shaw
2008	(Australia) David Pell	(Australia) Chris Jongewaard	(Australia) Cameron Hughes
2009	(Australia) Malcolm Rudolph	(Australia) William Clarke	(Australia) Cameron Jennings
2010	(Australia) Nathan Earle	(Australia) Brendan Brooks	(Australia) Sam Rutherford
2011	(Australia) Mark Jamieson	(Australia) Chris Jory	(Australia) Brian McLeod
2012	(Australia) Peter Herzig	(Australia) Michael Cupitt	(Australia) Malcolm Rudolph
2013	(Australia) Jack Anderson	(Australia) Benjamin Johnson	(Australia) Nathan Elliott
2014	(Australia) Sean Lake	(Australia) Olivier Kent-Spark	(Denmark) Kristian Juel
2015	(Australia) Sean Lake	(Australia) Cyrus Monk	(New Zealand) Tom Davison
2016	(Australia) Patrick Lane	(Australia) Nathan Elliott	(Australia) Patrick Shaw
2017	(Australia) Neil van der Ploeg	(Australia) Mathew Ross	(Australia) Ayden Toovey
2018	(Australia) Nathan Elliott	(Germany) Raphael Freienstein	(Australia) Cameron Scott
2019	(Australia) William Hodges	(Australia) Dylan Sunderland	(Australia) Nicholas White
2020	annulé		
2021	(Australia) Rudy Porter	(Australia) Samuel Hill	(Australia) Ryan Cavanagh
2022	(Australia) Drew Morey	(Australia) Mark O'Brien	(Australia) Samuel Hill
2023	(Australia) Zac Marriage	(Australia) Max Campbell	(Australia) Rhys Robotham
2024	(Australia) Bentley Niquet-Olden	(Australia) Ben Carman	(Australia) Oliver Stenning
