= Australian National Road Race Championships =

National road cycling championship in Australia

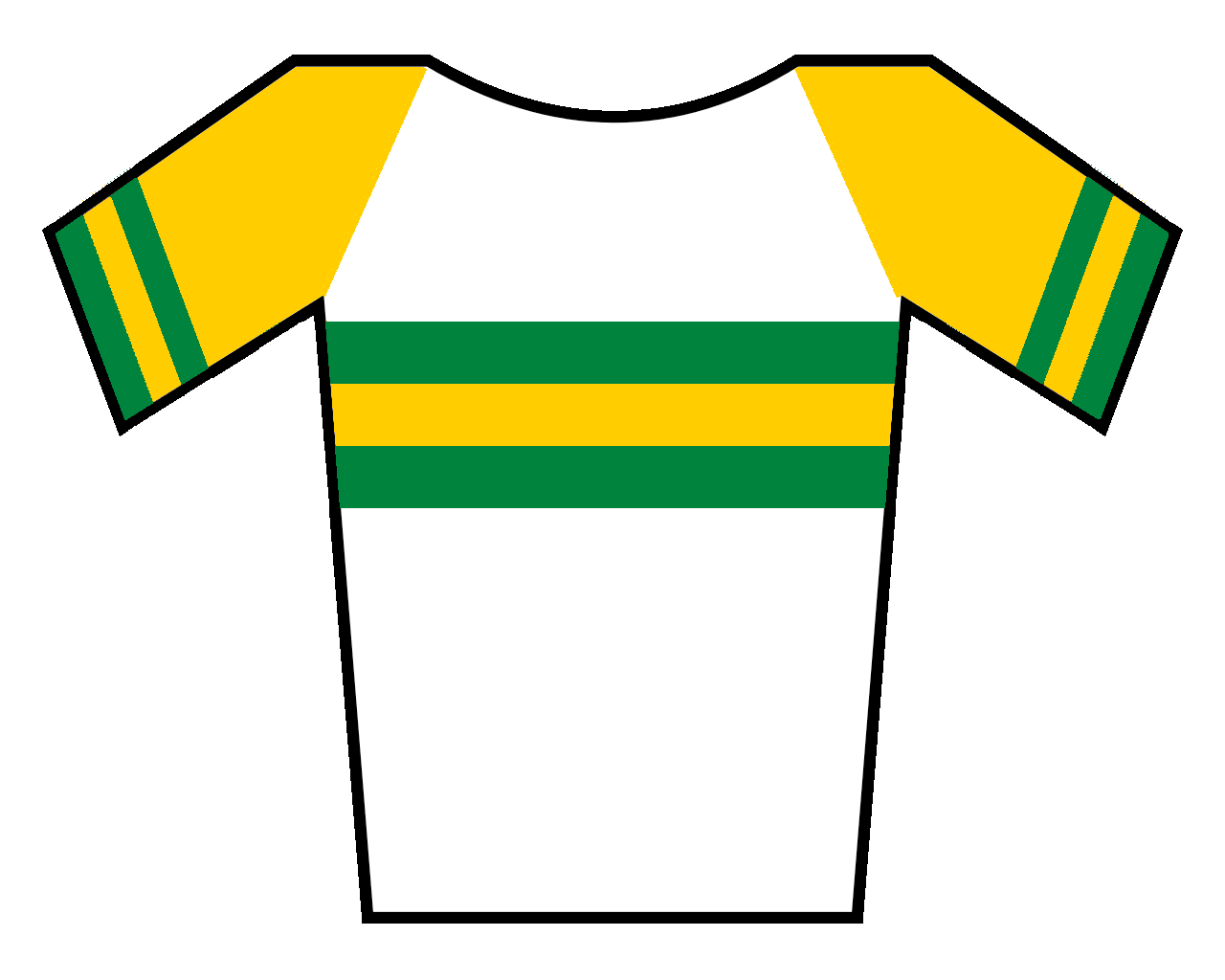
The Champion's Jersey

The Australian National Road Race Championships are held annually with an event for each category of bicycle rider: men, women and under-23 riders. The event also includes the Australian National Time Trial Championships since 2002. The Australian Championships were officially known as the Scody Australian Open Road Cycling Championships from 1999 to 2010, taking the name of their main sponsor. This changed to the Mars Cycling Australia Road National Championships from 2011 but they are more commonly referred to as The Nationals. The under-23 championships were introduced in 2001. Note that these results do not currently include the senior and junior amateur road race championships that were held prior to the open era.

The winners of each event are awarded with a symbolic cycling jersey featuring green and yellow stripes, which can be worn by the rider at other road racing events in the country to show their status as national champion. The champion's stripes can be combined into a sponsored rider's team kit design for this purpose.

From 1901 to 1949 the Australian Professional Long Distance Road Cycling Championship was contested annually (with the exception of the years 1940 to 1945, due to the outbreak of World War II). Until 1939, the title of long distance road champion of Australia was awarded to the fastest time in the Warrnambool to Melbourne Classic over 165 miles (266 km). Riders attended from all over Australia and New Zealand. From 1902 the fastest NSW rider in the Goulburn to Sydney Classic was selected to appear for NSW. In 1927 the Warrnambool to Melbourne was replaced by the Dunlop Grand Prix, a 690.5 miles (1,111.3 km) race over four stages. In 1934 the Warrnambool to Melbourne was again replaced by a stage race, the Centenary 1000, a 1,102 miles (1,773 km) race over seven stages. In 1946, the national long distance championship was awarded to the rider making the fastest time in the 187 miles (301 km) Melbourne to Horsham road race. In 1947 and 1948, the championship was awarded to the rider making the fastest time in the 192 miles (309 km) Melbourne to Albury road race. In 1949, the title of long distance road champion of Australia was awarded to the rider making the fastest time in the 195 miles (314 km) Melbourne to Lakes Entrance road race.

In 1950 the first separate event was held at Cronulla.

The women's event was first held in 1978.

== Multiple winners ==
Men

Wins	Name	Years
4	Hubert Opperman	1924, 1926, 1927, 1929
3	Phil O'Shea	1911, 1922, 1923
3	Russell Mockridge	1956, 1957, 1958
3	John Trevorrow	1978, 1979, 1980
3	Luke Plapp	2022, 2023, 2024
2	Tom Larcombe	1904, 1907
2	Richard Lamb	1930, 1932
2	Alan Angus	1936, 1937
2	Dean Toseland	1938, 1939
2	Max Rowley	1946, 1949
2	Eddie Smith	1954, 1955
2	Fred Roche	1959, 1960
2	Barry Waddell	1964, 1968
2	Kerry Hoole	1966, 1973
2	Graham McVilly	1970, 1971
2	Donald Wilson	1975, 1977
2	Peter Besanko	1976, 1984
2	Wayne Hildred	1982, 1986
2	Neil Stephens	1991, 1995
2	Robbie McEwen	2002, 2005
2	Simon Gerrans	2012, 2014
2	Jack Bobridge	2011, 2016
2	Cameron Meyer	2020, 2021
2	Luke Durbridge	2013, 2025

Women

Wins	Rider	Years
4	Kathleen Shannon	1985, 1986, 1990, 1991
4	Kathy Watt	1992, 1993, 1994, 1998
3	Amanda Spratt	2012, 2016, 2020
2	Deborah Kinnear	1987, 1988
2	Katie Mactier	2001, 2007
2	Oenone Wood	2004, 2008
2	Gracie Elvin	2013, 2014

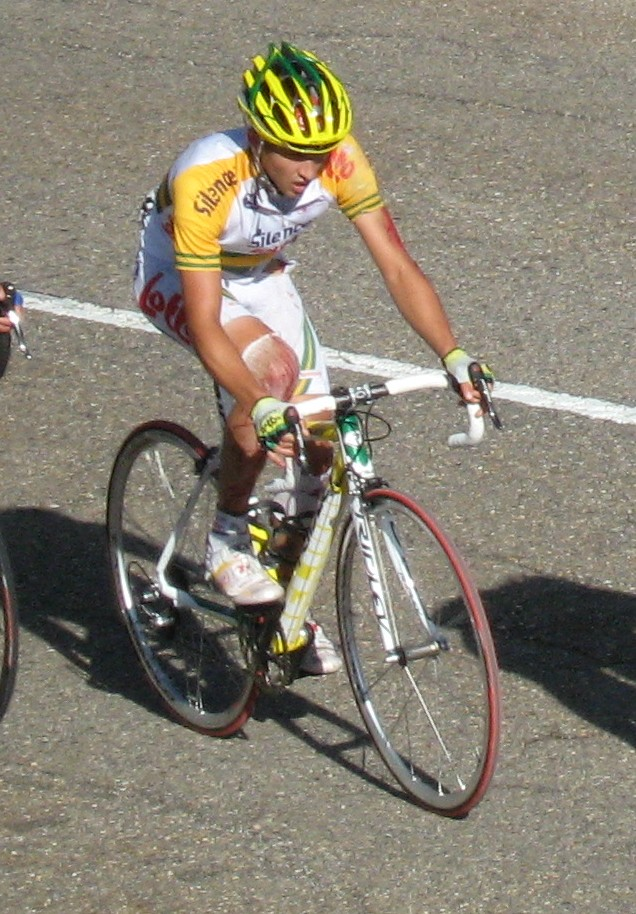
Matthew Lloyd

== Elite ==
=== Men ===
Year	Gold	Time	Silver	Bronze	Distance	Location	Ref.
1901	Andy Ralston (NZ) (Note: The race was promoted as the championship of Australasia.)	9h 00' 30"	Albert E. Nioa	David Duncan Alexander	165 mi (266 km)	Warrnambool, Vic	
1902	HG O’Callaghan, Vic	8h 46' 23"	Albert E. Nioa	Andy Ralston (NZ)	165 mi (266 km)	Warrnambool, Vic	
1903	Jack Arnst (NZ)	7h 43' 00"	Richard Arnst (NZ)	Charley Gee	165 mi (266 km)	Warrnambool, Vic	
1904	Tom Larcombe, NSW	7h 48' 07"	Jack Wright, Vic	Harold Henderson (NZ)	165 mi (266 km)	Warrnambool, Vic	
1905	William Hawley, Vic	7h 52' 26"	Herbert William Viney, Tas	Charlie Baulderstone, SA	165 mi (266 km)	Warrnambool, Vic	
1906	Hermann Ellmers Mehrtens (NZ)	8h 53' 52"	Alf Birch (NZ)	Albert E Humm (NZ)	165 mi (266 km)	Warrnambool, Vic	
1907	Tom Larcombe, NSW	7h 40' 10"	Edward Birch	Meldrum Dobie	165 mi (266 km)	Warrnambool, Vic	
1908	Matt Chappell, Vic	7h 46' 27"	Orwood "Chummy" Pearne, Tas	HT Munro	165 mi (266 km)	Warrnambool, Vic	
1909	Iddo "Snowy" Munro, Vic	7h 12' 51"	Albert H. Pianta, Vic	Thomas "Jeb" Gascoyne, Vic	165 mi (266 km)	Warrnambool, Vic	
1910	Joe Pianta, WA	9h 30' 46"	Joe McSweeney, WA	Andy Colvin	165 mi (266 km)	Warrnambool, Vic	
1911	Phil O'Shea (NZ)	8h 08' 44"	Albert H. Pianta, WA	J Tozer (NZ)	165 mi (266 km)	Warrnambool, Vic	
1912-1921	Not held						
1922	Phil O'Shea (NZ)	8h 59' 08"	Don Kirkham, (Vic)	Les "Bowie" Stevens, Vic	165 mi (266 km)	Warrnambool, Vic	
1923	Phil O'Shea (NZ)	7h 51' 41"	Jack Beasley, Vic	Ernie Bainbridge, Vic	165 mi (266 km)	Warrnambool, Vic	
1924	Hubert Opperman, Vic	7h 15' 37"	Ernie Bainbridge, Vic	TJ Robinson, SA	165 mi (266 km)	Warrnambool, Vic	
1925	Harold Smith, WA	7h 25' 01"	Jack J Beasley, Vic	AR White, NSW	165 mi (266 km)	Warrnambool, Vic	
1926	Hubert Opperman, Vic	7h 36' 10"	Harold Smith, WA	George McLeod, Vic	165 mi (266 km)	Warrnambool, Vic	
1927	Hubert Opperman, Vic	40h 41' 34"	Harry Watson (NZ)	Ernie Bainbridge, Vic	691 mi (1,112 km)	Victoria	
1928	Not held						
1929	Hubert Opperman, Vic	8h 07' 10"	George McLeod, Vic	Horrie Marshall, WA	165 mi (266 km)	Warrnambool, Vic	
1930	Richard Lamb, Vic	8h 20' 10"	Hubert Opperman, Vic	Ken Ross, NSW	165 mi (266 km)	Warrnambool, Vic	
1931	Matt Lynch, Vic	6h 31' 28"	Allan Oram, Vic	Herbert Withal, Vic	165 mi (266 km)	Warrnambool, Vic	
1932	Richard Lamb, Vic	6h 21' 18"	Ossie Nicholson, Vic		165 mi (266 km)	Warrnambool, Vic	
1933	Hefty Stuart, Vic	6h 27' 56"	Hubert Opperman, Vic	Richard Lamb, Vic	165 mi (266 km)	Warrnambool, Vic	
1934	Harry Cruise, Vic	53h 30' 33"	Harry Watson (NZ)	Richard Lamb, Vic	1,000 mi (1,600 km)	Victoria	
1935	Clinton Beasley, Vic	6h 24' 36"	Richard Lamb, Vic	Dean Toseland, SA	165 mi (266 km)	Warrnambool, Vic	
1936	Alan Angus, Vic	6h 44' 50"	Clinton Beasley, Vic	Dean Toseland, SA	165 mi (266 km)	Warrnambool, Vic	
1937	Alan Angus, Vic	7h 19' 09"	Clinton Beasley, Vic	Lloyd Thomas (NZ)	165 mi (266 km)	Warrnambool, Vic	
1938	Dean Toseland, SA	6h 44' 53"	Keith Thurgood, SA	J Christison, NSW	165 mi (266 km)	Warrnambool, Vic	
1939	Dean Toseland, SA	8h 18' 06"	Bill Moritz, SA	Keith Thurgood, SA	165 mi (266 km)	Warrnambool, Vic	
1940-1945	Not held						
1946	Max Rowley, Vic	9h 31' 28"	Jack Bates, Vic	Keith Rowley, Vic	187 mi (301 km)	Horsham, Vic	
1947	Jack Bates, Vic	8h 54' 40"	Max Rowley, Vic	Dean Toseland, SA	192 mi (309 km)	Albury, Vic	
1948	Duncan Hunter, Vic	8h 02' 22"	Keith Rowley	Max Rowley, Vic	192 mi (309 km)	Albury, Vic	
1949	Max Rowley, Vic	8h 55' 49"	Keith Rowley	Jack Bates, Vic	195 mi (314 km)	Lakes Entrance, Vic	
1950	Keith Rowley, Vic	5h 55' 20"	Harold Johnson, NSW	Stan Bonney, Vic	125 mi (201 km)	Cronulla, New South Wales	
1951	John Beasley, Vic	6h 10' 48"	Graham Stabell	Peter Anthony	125 mi (201 km)	Templestowe, Vic	
1952	Neil Peadon, NSW	6h 21' 36"	Graham Stabell	Max Rowley, Vic	125 mi (201 km)	Centennial Park, NSW	
1953	Alby Saunders, Vic	5h 40' 52"	Hector Sutherland, Vic	Neil Peadon, NSW	125 mi (201 km)	Launceston, Tas	
1954	Eddie Smith, Vic	5h 45' 58"	Hector Sutherland, Vic	Angelo Catalano	125 mi (201 km)	Ringwood, Vic	
1955	Eddie Smith, Vic		Murray French	Ronald Murray	125 mi (201 km)	Centennial Park, NSW	
1956	Russell Mockridge	6h 18' 22"	Eddie Smith, Vic	Viv Blazely	125 mi (201 km)	Hobart, Tas	
1957	Russell Mockridge	6h 24' 35"	James Taylor	Peter Panton	125 mi (201 km)	Melbourne, Vic	
1958	Russell Mockridge		Peter Panton	Barry Waddell			
1959	Fred Roche	5h 45' 18"	Sid Patterson	John Young	125 mi (201 km)	Colac, Vic	
1960	Fred Roche		John Young	Bill Knevitt			
1961	Neville Veale		Bill Knevitt	Fred Roche			
1962	John O'Sullivan		Alan McLennan	Kerry Hoole			
1963	Warwick Dalton (NZ)	6h 07' 00"	Kerry Hoole	John Young	125 mi (201 km)	Mount Gambier, SA	
1964	Barry Waddell		Bill Lawrie	Sid Patterson			
1965	Matt Martino		Barry Walker	John Young			
1966	Kerry Hoole		Ian Campbell	Glen Birmingham			
1967	Graeme Gilmore		Keith Oliver, Jr.	Kerry Hoole		Lithgow, NSW	
1968	Barry Waddell		Kerry Hoole	Keith Oliver, Jr.			
1969	Robert Whetters		Tony Kelliher	Kerry Hoole			
1970	Graham McVilly		Keith Oliver, Jr.	Alan Goodchild			
1971	Graham McVilly		Kerry Hoole	Jeffery Hartley			
1972	Kevin Spencer		Frank Atkins	Kerry Hoole			
1973	Kerry Hoole		Henk Vogels Sr.	Vic Adams			
1974	Graham Rowley		Vic Adams	Warren Rudd			
1975	Donald Wilson		Bruce Hunt	Mike Dye			
1976	Peter Besanko	5h 04' 21"	Graham McVilly	Tony Branchflower			
1977	Donald Wilson		John Trevorrow				
1978	John Trevorrow		Graeme Hodgkiss	Shane Bartley			
1979	John Trevorrow		David Allan	Terry Hammond			
1980	John Trevorrow		Peter Besanko	Terry Stacey			
1981	Clyde Sefton		John Trevorrow	David Allan			
1982	Wayne Hildred (NZ)		Terry Hammond	Peter Besanko			
1983	Terry Hammond	6h 00' 55"	Clyde Sefton	Shane Sutton	200 km (120 mi)	Surfers Paradise, Qld	
1984	Peter Besanko		Jim Krynen	Shane Sutton			
1985	Laurie Venn		Murray Hall	Wayne Nicholls	200 km (120 mi)	Melbourne, Vic	
1986	Wayne Hildred (NZ)		Michael Lynch	Anthony Hughes			
1987	Alan Dipple		Wayne Hildred (NZ)	Paul Miller			
1988	Paul Miller		Michael Lynch	Paul Rugari			
1989	Gary Clively		Eddy Salas	Scott Steward			
1990	Dean McDonald		Eddy Salas	Malcolm Van Unen		Launceston, Tas	
1991	Neil Stephens		Peter Besanko	Marcus Burns			
1992	David McFarlane		Gavin Parsonage	Tim Jamieson			
1993	Eddy Salas		Gavin Parsonage	Peter Besanko			
1994	Allan Iacuone		Nick Gates	Scott McGrory			
1995	Neil Stephens		Scott McGrory	Damien Forster			
1996	Nick Gates	5h 01' 50"	Damian McDonald	Eddy Salas	200 km (120 mi)	Centennial Park, NSW	
1997	Jonathan Hall	4h 17' 04"	Tristan Priem	Steve Williams	160 km (99 mi)	Perth, WA	
1998	David McKenzie	4h 38' 16"	Tom Leaper	Eddy Salas	188 km (117 mi)	Melbourne, Vic	
1999	Henk Vogels	4h 42' 41"	Stuart O'Grady	Jamie Drew	195 km (121 mi)	Portarlington, Vic	
2000	Jamie Drew	4h 58' 56"	Scott Sunderland	Robbie McEwen	195 km (121 mi)	Portarlington, Vic	(Note: The race was won by Jeremy Hunt (GBR) however the title went to the first Australian.)
2001	Steve Williams	4h 50' 35"	Cameron Hughes	Matthew Wilson	195 km (121 mi)	Portarlington, Vic	
2002	Robbie McEwen	4h 46' 18"	Nathan O'Neill	Robert Tighello	180 km (110 mi)	Ballarat, Vic	
2003	Stuart O'Grady	4h 51' 37"	Allan Davis	Patrick Jonker	180 km (110 mi)	Ballarat, Vic	
2004	Matthew Wilson	4h 47' 43"	Robert McLachlan	David McKenzie	180 km (110 mi)	Ballarat, Vic	
2005	Robbie McEwen	4h 10' 13"	Robert McLachlan	Paul Crake	182 km (113 mi)	Echunga, SA	
2006	Russell Van Hout	4h 09' 17"	Adam Hansen	Henk Vogels	176 km (109 mi)	Mount Torrens, SA	
2007	Darren Lapthorne	4h 16' 18"	Robert McLachlan	Karl Menzies	163 km (101 mi)	Ballarat, Vic	
2008	Matthew Lloyd	4h 13' 22"	Adam Hansen	Rory Sutherland	163 km (101 mi)	Ballarat, Vic	
2009	Peter McDonald	4h 10' 34"	Michael Rogers	Adam Hansen	163 km (101 mi)	Ballarat, Vic	
2010	Travis Meyer	4h 26' 31"	David Kemp	Damien Turner	163 km (101 mi)	Ballarat, Vic	
2011	Jack Bobridge	4h 12' 42"	Matthew Goss	Simon Gerrans	163 km (101 mi)	Ballarat, Vic	
2012	Simon Gerrans	4h 07' 38"	Matthew Lloyd	Richie Porte	163 km (101 mi)	Ballarat, Vic	
2013	Luke Durbridge	4h 00' 46"	Michael Matthews	Steele Von Hoff	196 km (122 mi)	Ballarat, Vic	
2014	Simon Gerrans	4h 43' 43"	Cadel Evans	Richie Porte	184 km (114 mi)	Ballarat, Vic	
2015	Heinrich Haussler	4h 47' 24"	Caleb Ewan	Neil Van der Ploeg	183 km (114 mi)	Ballarat, Vic	
2016	Jack Bobridge	4h 40' 30"	Cameron Meyer	Patrick Lane	183 km (114 mi)	Ballarat, Vic	
2017	Miles Scotson	4h 37' 55"	Simon Gerrans	Nathan Haas	183 km (114 mi)	Ballarat, Vic	
2018	Alexander Edmondson	4h 54' 27"	Jay McCarthy	Chris Harper	183 km (114 mi)	Ballarat, Vic	
2019	Michael Freiberg	4h 44' 48"	Chris Harper	Cameron Meyer	185.6 km (115.3 mi)	Ballarat, Vic	
2020	Cameron Meyer	4h 48' 16"	Lucas Hamilton	Marcus Culey	186 km (116 mi)	Buninyong, Vic	
2021	Cameron Meyer	4h 39' 12"	Kelland O'Brien	Scott Bowden	185.6 km (115.3 mi)	Buninyong, Vic	
2022	Luke Plapp	4h 52' 04"	James Whelan	Brendan Johnston	185.6 km (115.3 mi)	Buninyong, Vic	
2023	Luke Plapp	4h 40' 42"	Simon Clarke	Michael Matthews	185.6 km (115.3 mi)	Buninyong, Vic	
2024	Luke Plapp	4h 34' 26"	Chris Harper	Kelland O'Brien	185.6 km (115.3 mi)	Buninyong, Vic	
2025	Luke Durbridge	3h 52' 19"	Luke Plapp	Liam Walsh	177 km (110 mi)	Perth, WA	
2026	Patrick Eddy	3h 55' 25"	Luke Plapp	Oscar Chamberlain	176 km (109 mi)	Perth, WA	

=== Women ===
Year	Gold	Time	Silver	Bronze	Distance	Location	Ref.
1978	Kerry Galvin		Kaye Lehmann	Ann Tew	25 km (16 mi)	Horsham, Vic	
1979	Linda Meadows	0h 41’ 25"	Barbara Eason	Sue Dennis	25 km (16 mi)	Horsham, Vic	
1980	Jenny Quaife						
1981	Heather Kelson	1h 19’ 46"	Elizabeth Battle	Vicky Carne	45.5 km (28.3 mi)	Launceston, Tas	
1982	Siân Mulholland		Michelle Robbins	Vicky Carne			
1983	Julie Speight						
1984	Robyn Battison	1h 35’ 14"	Kathleen Shannon	Deborah De Jongh			
1985	Kathleen Shannon	1h 20’ 48"	Robyn Battison	Wendy McKay	50 km (31 mi)	Bacchus Marsh, Vic	
1986	Kathleen Shannon		Elizabeth Hepple	Robyn Battison	52 km (32 mi)	Adelaide, SA	
1987	Deborah Kinnear	1h 23’ 17"	Kathy Watt	Jacqui Uttien	43 km (27 mi)		
1988	Deborah Kinnear	1h 52’ 32"	Kathleen Shannon	Kathy Watt	71 km (44 mi)		
1989	Jane Slack-Smith	1h 48’ 29"	Kathleen Shannon	Jennifer Hall	66 km (41 mi)	Canberra, ACT	
1990	Kathleen Shannon	2h 07’ 55"	Jacqui Uttien	Donna Rae-Szalisnki	70 km (43 mi)	Perth, WA	
1991	Kathleen Shannon	2h 12’ 00"	Margaret Henderson	Jacqui Uttien	75 km (47 mi)	Gembrook, Vic	
1992	Kathy Watt	2h 12’ 00"	Catherine Hart	Anita Crossley	70 km (43 mi)	Adelaide, SA	
1993	Kathy Watt	2h 10’ 38"	Anita Crossley	Cathy Reardon	78 km (48 mi)	Devonport, Tas	
1994	Kathy Watt	2h 23’ 15"	Cathy Reardon	Anna Millward (née Wilson)	87 km (54 mi)	Sunshine Coast, Qld	
1995	Elizabeth Tadich	2h 46’ 42"	Charlotte White-Pordham	Tracey Gaudry (née Watson)	96.4 km (59.9 mi)	Canberra, ACT	
1996	Lynn Nixon	2h 54’ 28"	Kathy Watt	Anna Millward	110 km (68 mi)	Centennial Park, NSW	
1997	Symenko Jochinke	2h 51’ 13"	Anna Millward	Bridget Evans	100 km (62 mi)	Perth, WA	
1998	Kathy Watt	2h 47’ 04"	Karin Wilson	Elizabeth Tadich	100 km (62 mi)	Melbourne, Vic	
1999	Tracey Gaudry	3h 18’ 26"	Kathy Watt	Alison Wright	108 km (67 mi)	Gold Coast, Qld	
2000	Anna Millward	2h 45’ 47"	Alison Wright	Tracey Gaudry	97 km (60 mi)	Portarlington, Vic	
2001	Katie Mactier	2h 48’ 06"	Elizabeth Tadich	Margaret Hemsley	97 km (60 mi)	Portarlington, Vic	
2002	Margaret Hemsley	3h 07’ 38"	Hayley Rutherford	Emma James	100 km (62 mi)	Ballarat, Vic	
2003	Olivia Gollan	3h 03’ 53"	Oenone Wood	Shirley Kim	102 km (63 mi)	Ballarat, Vic	
2004	Oenone Wood	3h 01’ 30"	Katie Mactier	Sara Carrigan	100 km (62 mi)	Ballarat, Vic	
2005	Lorian Graham	2h 53’ 47"	Sara Carrigan	Bridget Evans	104 km (65 mi)	Mount Torrens, SA	
2006	Katherine Bates	2h 46’ 45"	Sara Carrigan	Oenone Wood	97.5 km (60.6 mi)	Mount Torrens, SA	
2007	Katie Mactier	3h 10’ 35"	Nikki Egyed	Emma Rickards	102 km (63 mi)	Ballarat, Vic	
2008	Oenone Wood	3h 05’ 13"	Sharon Laws	Sara Carrigan	102 km (63 mi)	Ballarat, Vic	
2009	Carla Ryan	3h 03’ 37"	Ruth Corset	Nikki Butterfield	102 km (63 mi)	Ballarat, Vic	
2010	Ruth Corset	3h 10’ 09"	Bridie O'Donnell	Rachel Neylan	102 km (63 mi)	Ballarat, Vic	
2011	Alexis Rhodes	3h 00’ 18"	Carla Ryan	Joanne Hogan	102 km (63 mi)	Ballarat, Vic	
2012	Amanda Spratt	2h 55’ 22"	Tiffany Cromwell	Rachel Neylan	102 km (63 mi)	Ballarat, Vic	
2013	Gracie Elvin	3h 01’ 07"	Joanne Hogan	Carla Ryan	106.6 km (66.2 mi)	Ballarat, Vic	
2014	Gracie Elvin	3h 02' 42"	Lauren Kitchen	Katrin Garfoot	102 km (63 mi)	Ballarat, Vic	
2015	Peta Mullens	2h 55’ 29"	Rachel Neylan	Shara Gillow	102 km (63 mi)	Ballarat, Vic	
2016	Amanda Spratt	2h 56’ 45"	Ruth Corset	Rachel Neylan	102 km (63 mi)	Ballarat, Vic	
2017	Katrin Garfoot	2h 57’ 50"	Amanda Spratt	Lucy Kennedy	102 km (63 mi)	Ballarat, Vic	
2018	Shannon Malseed	3h 05’ 03"	Lauren Kitchen	Grace Brown	104.4 km (64.9 mi)	Ballarat, Vic	
2019	Sarah Gigante (Note: In winning the elite race, Sarah Gigante also won the U23 race.)	3h 03' 36"	Amanda Spratt	Sarah Roy	104 km (65 mi)	Ballarat, Vic	
2020	Amanda Spratt	2h 57' 59"	Justine Barrow	Grace Brown	104.4 km (64.9 mi)	Buninyong, Vic	
2021	Sarah Roy	3h 01' 52"	Grace Brown	Lauretta Hanson	104.4 km (64.9 mi)	Buninyong, Vic	
2022	Nicole Frain	3h 00' 44"	Grace Brown	Alyssa Polites	104.4 km (64.9 mi)	Buninyong, Vic	
2023	Brodie Chapman	3h 01' 35"	Grace Brown	Amanda Spratt	104.4 km (64.9 mi)	Buninyong, Vic	
2024	Ruby Roseman-Gannon	3h 04' 52"	Lauretta Hanson	Alexandra Manly	104.4 km (64.9 mi)	Buninyong, Vic	
2025	Lucinda Stewart (Note: In winning the elite race, Lucinda Stewart also won the U23 race.)	2h 46' 59"	Ella Simpson	Cassia Boglio	109 km (68 mi)	Perth, WA	
2026	Mackenzie Coupland	2h 48' 58"	Ruby Roseman-Gannon	Neve Bradbury	108 km (67 mi)	Perth, WA	

== Under 23 ==
=== Men ===
Year	Gold	Time	Silver	Bronze	Distance	Location	Ref.
2000	Andrew Stalder	5h 00' 52"	Simon Gerrans		195 km (121 mi)	Portarlington, Vic	
2001	Graeme Brown	4h 51' 18"	John Freiberg		195 km (121 mi)	Portarlington, Vic	
2002	Simon Gerrans	4h 49' 24"	Adrian Laidler	Allan Davis	180 km (110 mi)	Ballarat, Vic	
2003	Gene Bates	4h 53' 33"	David McPartland	Adrian Laidler	180 km (110 mi)	Ballarat, Vic	
2004	Rory Sutherland	4h 55' 36"	William Walker	Andrew Wyper	180 km (110 mi)	Ballarat, Vic	
2005	Christopher Sutton	4h 16' 30"	William Walker	Daniel Newnham	182 km (113 mi)	Echunga, SA	
2006	William Walker	4h 9' 17"	Wesley Sulzberger	Jonathan Clarke	175.5 km (109.1 mi)	Mount Torrens, SA	
2007	Wesley Sulzberger	3h 15' 00"	Cameron Meyer	Simon Clarke	122 km (76 mi)	Ballarat, Vic	
2008	Simon Clarke	3h 20' 33"	Matt King	Mark O'Brien	122 km (76 mi)	Ballarat, Vic	
2009	Jack Bobridge	3h 12' 48"	Michael Matthews & Mark O'Brien (Note: deadheat for second place.)		122 km (76 mi)	Ballarat, Vic	
2010	Michael Hepburn	3h 20' 07"	Malcolm Rudolph	Michael Matthews	122 km (76 mi)	Ballarat, Vic	
2011	Ben Dyball	3h 22' 05"	Nathan Haas	Joseph Lewis	122 km (76 mi)	Ballarat, Vic	
2012	Rohan Dennis	3h 04' 41"	Eric Sheppard	Calvin Watson	122 km (76 mi)	Ballarat, Vic	
2013	Jordan Kerby	3h 19' 48"	Damien Howson	Jack Haig	138 km (86 mi)	Ballarat, Vic	
2014	Caleb Ewan	3h 23' 31"	Robert Power	Bradley Linfield	133 km (83 mi)	Ballarat, Vic	
2015	Miles Scotson	3h 22' 57"	Alexander Edmondson	Alistair Donohoe	133 km (83 mi)	Ballarat, Vic	
2016	Chris Hamilton	3h 29' 23"	Lucas Hamilton	Miles Scotson	133 km (83 mi)	Ballarat, Vic	
2017	Samuel Jenner	3h 27' 52"	Alexander Porter	Lucas Hamilton	133 km (83 mi)	Ballarat, Vic	
2018	Cyrus Monk	3h 21' 19"	James Whelan	Michael Potter	92.8 km (57.7 mi)	Ballarat, Vic	
2019	Nick White	2h 24' 48"	Michael Potter	Samuel Jenner	127 km (79 mi)	Ballarat, Vic	
2020	Jarrad Drizners	3h 37' 06"	Sebastian Berwick	Alastair Christie-Johnston	139.2 km (86.5 mi)	Buninyong, Vic	
2021	Thomas Benton	3h 33' 59"	Rudy Porter	Carter Turnbull	139.2 km (86.5 mi)	Buninyong, Vic	
2022	Blake Quick	3h 34' 53"	Matthew Dinham	Tristan Saunders	139.2 km (86.5 mi)	Buninyong, Vic	
2023	Alastair Mackellar	3h 38' 43"	Brady Gilmore	Alex Bogna	139.2 km (86.5 mi)	Buninyong, Vic	
2024	Fergus Browning	3h 34' 07"	Matthew Greenwood	Matthew Fox	139.2 km (86.5 mi)	Buninyong, Vic	
2025	Julian Baudry	3h 05' 53"	Fergus Browning	Jack Clark	136 km (85 mi)	Perth, WA	

=== Women ===
Year	Gold	Time	Silver	Bronze	Distance	Location	Ref.
2008	Carlee Taylor	3h 06’ 04"	Tiffany Cromwell	Grace Sulzberger	102 km (63 mi)	Ballarat, Vic	
2009	Peta Mullens	3h 05’ 01"	Sarah Kent	Tiffany Cromwell	102 km (63 mi)	Ballarat, Vic	
2010	Megan Dunn	3h 12’ 06"	Tiffany Cromwell	Loren Rowney	102 km (63 mi)	Ballarat, Vic	
2011	Carlee Taylor	3h 01’ 13"	Sinead Noonan	Lauren Kitchen	102 km (63 mi)	Ballarat, Vic	
2012	Sinead Noonan	2h 56’ 52"	Rebecca Werner	Rebecca Henderson	102 km (63 mi)	Ballarat, Vic	
2013	Emily Roper	3h 02' 26"	Rebecca Henderson	Jenelle Crooks	106.6 km (66.2 mi)	Ballarat, Vic	
2014	Emily Roper	3h 02' 42"	Jenelle Crooks	Jessica Mundy	102 km (63 mi)	Ballarat, Vic	
2015	Shannon Malseed	2h 56' 39"	Alexandria Nicholls	Ellen Skerritt	102 km (63 mi)	Ballarat, Vic	
2016	Jenelle Crooks	2h 57’ 20"	Jessica Mundy	Ellen Skerritt	102 km (63 mi)	Ballarat, Vic	
2017	Alexandra Manly	2h 57’ 20"	Emily Parkes	Jaime Gunning	102 km (63 mi)	Ballarat, Vic	
2018	Alexandra Manly	3h 07’ 35"	Josie Talbot	Kristina Clonan	104.4 km (64.9 mi)	Ballarat, Vic	
2019	Sarah Gigante	3h 03' 36"	Jaime Gunning	Jessica Pratt	104 km (65 mi)	Ballarat, Vic	
2020	Jaime Gunning	3h 03' 50"	Sarah Gigante	Ruby Roseman-Gannon	104.4 km (64.9 mi)	Buninyong, Vic	
2021	Emily Watts	3h 03' 19"	Neve Bradbury	Sarah Gigante	104.4 km (64.9 mi)	Buninyong, Vic	
2022	Alyssa Polites	3h 00' 48"	Neve Bradbury	Emily Watts	104.4 km (64.9 mi)	Buninyong, Vic	
2023	Ella Simpson	3h 02' 06"	Mia Hayden	Hannah Seeliger	104.4 km (64.9 mi)	Buninyong, Vic	
2024	Neve Bradbury	3h 04' 52"	Haylee Fuller	Ella Simpson	104.4 km (64.9 mi)	Buninyong, Vic	
2025	Lucinda Stewart	2h 46' 59"	Sophia Sammons	Alyssa Polites	109 km (68 mi)	Perth, WA	

== Junior / Under 19 ==
=== Men ===
Year	Gold	Time	Silver	Bronze	Distance	Location	Ref.
2005	John Rayner	2h 014' 10"	Hayden Josefski	Bradley Clarke		Sunshine, Vic	
2006	Cameron Meyer	2h 033' 39"	Stuart Grimsey	Daniel Braunsteins			
2007	Lachlan Stewart						
2008	Luke Durbridge						
2009	Patrick Bevin (NZ)	3h 02' 52"	Michael Phelan	Josh Atkins (NZ)	123 km (76 mi)	Murwillumbah, NSW	
2010	Jay McCarthy	3h 15' 13"	Dale Parker	Calvin Watson	123 km (76 mi)	Murwillumbah, NSW	
2011	Hayden McCormick	3h 09' 13"	Hamish Schreurs	Fraser Gough (NZ)	123 km (76 mi)	Murwillumbah, NSW	
2012	Robert-Jon McCarthy	3h 03' 51"	Caleb Ewan	Nick Schultz	127 km (79 mi)	Shepparton, Vic	
2013	Michael Rice	3h 08' 34"	Daniel Fitter	Ben Carman	118 km (73 mi)	Noosa Heads, Qld	
2014	Lucas Hamilton	3h 08' 50"	Daniel Fitter	Jai Hindley	118 km (73 mi)	Canberra, ACT	
2015	Michael Storer	2h 54' 52"	Nathaniel Levin (NZ)	Matthew Chambers	110 km (68 mi)	Gold Coast, Qld	
2016	Kaden Groves	3h 00' 32"	Alastair Christie-Johnston	Carne Groube (NZ)	122 km (76 mi)	Canberra, Act	
2017	Mitchell Wright	2h 59' 09"	Liam Edwards	Jensen Plowright	113 km (70 mi)	Geelong, Vic	
2018	Tyler Lindorff	1h 47' 45"	Ben Metcalfe	Carter Turnbull	69.6 km (43.2 mi)	Ballarat, Vic	
2019	Patrick Eddy	2h 48' 28"	Samual Eddy	Alastair Mackellar	104.4 km (64.9 mi)	Ballarat, Vic	
2020	Declan Trezise	2h 49' 58"	Patrick Eddy	Alastair Mackellar	104.4 km (64.9 mi)	Buninyong, Vic	
2021	Dylan George	2h 46' 21"	Zac Marriage	Aiden Sinclair	104.4 km (64.9 mi)	Buninyong, Vic	
2022	Cameron Rogers	2h 46' 07"	Oscar Chamberlain	Campbell Palmer	104.4 km (64.9 mi)	Buninyong, Vic	
2023	Joshua Cranage	2h 47' 25"	Cohen Jessen	Wil Holmes	104.4 km (64.9 mi)	Buninyong, Vic	
2024	Toby Inglis	2h 46' 39"	Wil Holmes	Max Goold	104.4 km (64.9 mi)	Buninyong, Vic	
2025	Alexander Hewes	2h 33' 56"	Jonas Shelverton	Fletcher Medway	109 km (68 mi)	Perth, WA	

=== Women ===
Year	Gold	Time	Silver	Bronze	Distance	Location	Ref.
2006	Courtney Le Lay						
2007	Josie Tomic						
2008	Lauren Kitchen						
2009	Megan Dunn	2h 15' 10"	Kendelle Hodges	Madeleine Brunton (NZ)		Murwillumbah, NSW	
2010	Stephanie Hansen	2h 11' 12"	Sinead Noonan	Amy Cure	71 km (44 mi)	Murwillumbah, NSW	
2011	Taylah Jennings	2h 27' 05"	Jessica Mundy	Allison Rice	82 km (51 mi)	Stokers Siding, NSW	
2012	Emily Roper	2h 21' 15"	Maddi Campbell (NZ)	Jessica Mundy	82 km (51 mi)	Shepparton, Vic	
2013	Emily McRedmond	2h 29' 19"	Alexandria Nicholls	Alexandra Manly	80.7 km (50.1 mi)	Noosa Heads, Qld	
2014	Macey Stewart	2h 26' 10"	Alexandra Manly	Anna-Leeza Hull	78.9 km (49.0 mi)	Canberra, ACT	
2015	Hannah Gumbley (NZ)	2h 42' 40"	Jessica Pratt	Ruby Roseman-Gannon	82.5 km (51.3 mi)	Gold Coast, Qld	
2016	Madeleine Fasnacht	2h 19' 53"	Chloe Moran	Natasha Mullany	81 km (50 mi)	Canberra, Act	
2017	Madeleine Fasnacht	2h 00' 26"	Sarah Gigante	Caitlin Broadley	66 km (41 mi)	Geelong, Vic	
2018	Sarah Gigante	1h 45' 28"	Jemma Eastwood	Sophie Edwards	58 km (36 mi)	Ballarat, Vic	
2019	Francesca Sewell	2h 13' 59"	Catelyn Turner	Ashlee Jones	59.6 km (37.0 mi)	Ballarat, Vic	
2020	Haylee Fullers	2h 11' 29"	Alyssa Polites	Catelyn Turner	69.6 km (43.2 mi)	Buninyong, Vic	
2021	Alyssa Polities	2h 07' 24"	Lucy Stewart	Isabelle Carnes	69.6 km (43.2 mi)	Buninyong, Vic	
2022	Sophie Marr	2h 11' 41"	Lucy Stewart	Isabelle Carnes	69.6 km (43.2 mi)	Buninyong, Vic	
2023	Felicity Wilson-Haffenden	2h 04' 47"	Mackenzie Coupland	Talia Appleton	69.6 km (43.2 mi)	Buninyong, Vic	
2024	Lauren Bates	2h 32' 02"	Emily Dixon	Hannah Gianatti	81.2 km (50.5 mi)	Buninyong, Vic	
2025	Anna Dubier	2h 23' 00"	Amelie Sanders	Leani Van der Berg	81 km (50 mi)	Perth, WA	

== See also ==
- Australian National Time Trial Championships
- Australian National Criterium Championships
- National Road Cycling Championships
