= Edward Salas =

Australian cyclist

Personal information
- Full name: Edward Salas
- Born: 24 August 1965 (age 61) Montevideo, Uruguay

Cycling career
- Sport: Cycling
- Role: Rider

Edward Salas (born 24 August 1965) is a former Australian racing cyclist. He won the Australian national road race title in 1993 and competed at the 1988 Seoul Olympics, finishing sixth in the men's individual road race.

== Major results ==
1987
9th Gran Premio della Liberazione
1988
6th Road race, Olympic Games
1989
1st GP Industria & Artigianato di Larciano
3rd Trofeo Matteotti
1990
5th Overall Herald Sun Tour
1991
5th Road race, National Road Championships
1993
1st Road race, National Road Championships
1998
1st Stage 2b Herald Sun Tour
1999
1st Stage 12 Herald Sun Tour
