= David McFarlane =

David McFarlane is the name of:

- David McFarlane (footballer) (born 1979), Scottish footballer
- David McFarlane (cyclist) (born 1959), Australian cyclist
