= Victorian Cycling Grand Prix =

Australian one-day classic cycling race

Race details
- Date: 12 October 1946
- Region: Victoria, Australia
- Type: One-day classic

History
- Editions: 1
- First winner: Phil Thomas, SA

The Victorian Cycling Grand Prix was a one-day classic road bicycle race held in October 1946. It was the longest and richest cycling race held in Australia that year, and at the time was the longest one-day road cycling event ever staged in Victoria.

Professional cycling events in Australia were largely suspended in the years from 1940 to 1945 as a result of the Second World War, and in 1946 the Victorian Cycling Grand Prix was held in October at around the time the Warrnambool to Melbourne one-day classic had been held in the pre-war years. The Grand Prix was described at the time as "the cycling classic of the year" and "Australia's 1946 cycling classic" and the winner (Phil Thomas, SA) was lauded as the "outstanding professional roadman in Australia in 1946" as a result of his victory in the race. Unlike the Warrnambool to Melbourne, the event was a Scratch Race with a massed start of close to 100 entrants, categorised into A, B and C grades. The event also carried the Victorian Long Distance Championship for 1946.

The race covered 195 miles (314 km), starting in Bendigo at 5:50am before passing through Castlemaine, Maryborough, Ballarat and Geelong and finishing in front of a large crowd of nearly 10,000 at the Melbourne Showgrounds, where a large all-sports carnival was held on the same day. The race was neutralised at Meredith (123 miles) while competitors were transported by truck over six miles of unmade road. Town sprints were contested at many towns along the route, and a large cash prize was available for the best breakaway. The first 20 riders to finish went on to compete in a 3-mile exhibition track race at the Showgrounds that evening.

== Results ==
Overall
	Rider	Time
1	P. Thomas, SA	8h 33' 30"
2	S. Branagrove, Vic	+0'
3	D. Toseland, SA	+0'
4	M. Rowley, Vic	+0'
5	A. Barlow, Vic	+0'
6	A. Clancy, Vic	+0'
7	K. Rowley, Vic	+0'
8	K. Bowden, Vic	+0'
9	L. Savage, Vic	+0'
