= Jamie Drew =

Australian cyclist (born 1973)

Personal information
- Full name: Jamie Peter Drew
- Born: 7 December 1973 (age 52) Warrnambool, Australia

Cycling career
- Sport: Cycling
- Current team: Retired
- Discipline: Road
- Role: Rider

Professional teams
- 1999–2000: Selle Italia
- 2000–2001: Mercury–Mannheim Auctions
- 2002–2003: iTeamNova.com

Jamie Peter Drew (born 7 December 1973) is an Australian former racing cyclist. He won the Australian national road race title in 2000. He won the Melbourne to Warrnambool Classic in 1999 and 2002.

== Major results ==
1994
1st Stage 4 Commonwealth Bank Classic
1996
1st Stage 5 Tour of Tasmania
1997
1st Grafton to Inverell Classic
1998
1st Giro delle Due Province
1999
1st Melbourne to Warrnambool Classic
1st Grafton to Inverell Classic
1st Melbourne to Sorrento Classic (with Stuart O'Grady)
3rd Road race, National Road Championships
6th Overall Herald Sun Tour
2000
1st Road race, National Road Championships
1st Overall Mi-Août en Bretagne
1st Overall Sea Otter Classic

1st Stage 3

1st Stage 2 Tour de Langkawi
1st Stage 15 (ITT) Herald Sun Tour
2001
2nd Overall Valley of the Sun Stage Race
2002
1st Melbourne to Warrnambool Classic
2003
2nd Melbourne to Warrnambool Classic
9th Overall Herald Sun Tour

1st Stage 4
