= Veale =

Veale may refer to:

- Bob Veale (1935–2025), American baseball player
- Charles Veale (c.1838–1872), American Civil War Medal of Honor recipient
- Douglas Veale (1891–1973), Registrar of the University of Oxford 1930–1958
- John Veale (1922–2006), English classical composer
- Marty Veale (born 1977), New Zealand-born rugby union player and coach
- Neville Veale, Australian racing cyclist active in the 1960s
- Ron Veale (born 1945), Canadian jurist and former politician
- Theodore William Henry Veale (1892–1980), English recipient of the Victoria Cross
- William Charles Douglas Veale (1895–1971), Town Clerk (CEO) of the City of Adelaide (1947–1965)

== See also ==
- Veale Gardens in Adelaide, named after William Charles Douglas Veale
- Veale Township, Daviess County, Indiana
