= Matt Martino =

Australian racing cyclist

Personal information
- Full name: Mathew Michael Martino
- Born: 1/07/1941 San Marco in Lamis (Puglia - Italy)
- Died: 28/08/2023 Melbourne, Victoria, Australia

Cycling career
- Sport: Cycling
- Role: Rider

Matt Martino was an Australian racing cyclist. He won the Australian national road race title in 1965.
