= Hector Sutherland (cyclist) =

Australian cyclist

Personal information
- Born: 6 March 1930
- Died: 26 April 2011 (aged 81) Hastings, Victoria, Australia

Cycling career
- Sport: Cycling
- Role: Rider
Medal record
Men's road bicycle racing
Representing Australia
British Empire Games
Gold medal – first place	1950 Auckland	Road race

Hector John Sutherland (6 March 1930 – 26 April 2011) was an Australian racing cyclist. He finished in second place in the Australian National Road Race Championships in 1953 and 1954. He won a gold medal in men's road race event at the 1950 Commonwealth Games.

Sutherland won the 1954 Herald Sun Tour and in 1955 won the Wangaratta Wheelrace at the Wangaratta Showgrounds.
