= Eddie Smith (cyclist) =

Australian cyclist (1926–1997)

Personal information
- Full name: Eddie Smith
- Born: 17 September 1926 Canberra, Australia
- Died: 4 July 1997 (aged 70) Melbourne, Australia

Cycling career
- Sport: Cycling
- Role: Rider

Eddie Smith (17 September 1926 – 4 July 1997) was an Australian racing cyclist. He won the Australian national road race title in 1954 and 1955. Smith finished second in 1956 behind Russell Mockridge.

In 1954, he won the Goulburn to Sydney Classic, in reverse direction from Enfield to Goulburn In the Melbourne to Warrnambool Classic Smith set the fastest time in 1954 and the third fastest time in 1949.
