= Jeffery Hartley =

Jeffery Hartley (born 5 March 1944 in Innisfail, Queensland) is a retired Australian professional track and road cyclist.

Hartley started racing in Townsville in Queensland, Australia at the age of 12. He achieved first and fastest in his first handicap road race, a 3-mile event at Townsville. The same month, he won his second race at the Royals Amateur Cycling Club track in Townsville. He won several juvenile and junior championships before beginning to compete for prize money at the age of 16, which in Australia at that time deemed him a professional and he then joined the Townsville City Wheelers.

In 1970 after winning the Queensland Individual Pursuit Championship, Hartley moved to Newcastle, New South Wales to race with the elite Riders, Ian Chapman and Bob Ryan. He won the New South Wales state individual pursuit championship that year. In 1971 Hartley won the Australian five mile track championship and came third in the Australian National Road Race Championships the same year.[2]

Hartley was a successful track rider on the European track racing circuit during 1972 and 1973 as part of the Sportslife Magazine Racing Team.[3]
