= Phil O'Shea (cyclist) =

New Zealand racing cyclist (1889–1980)

Philip O'Shea
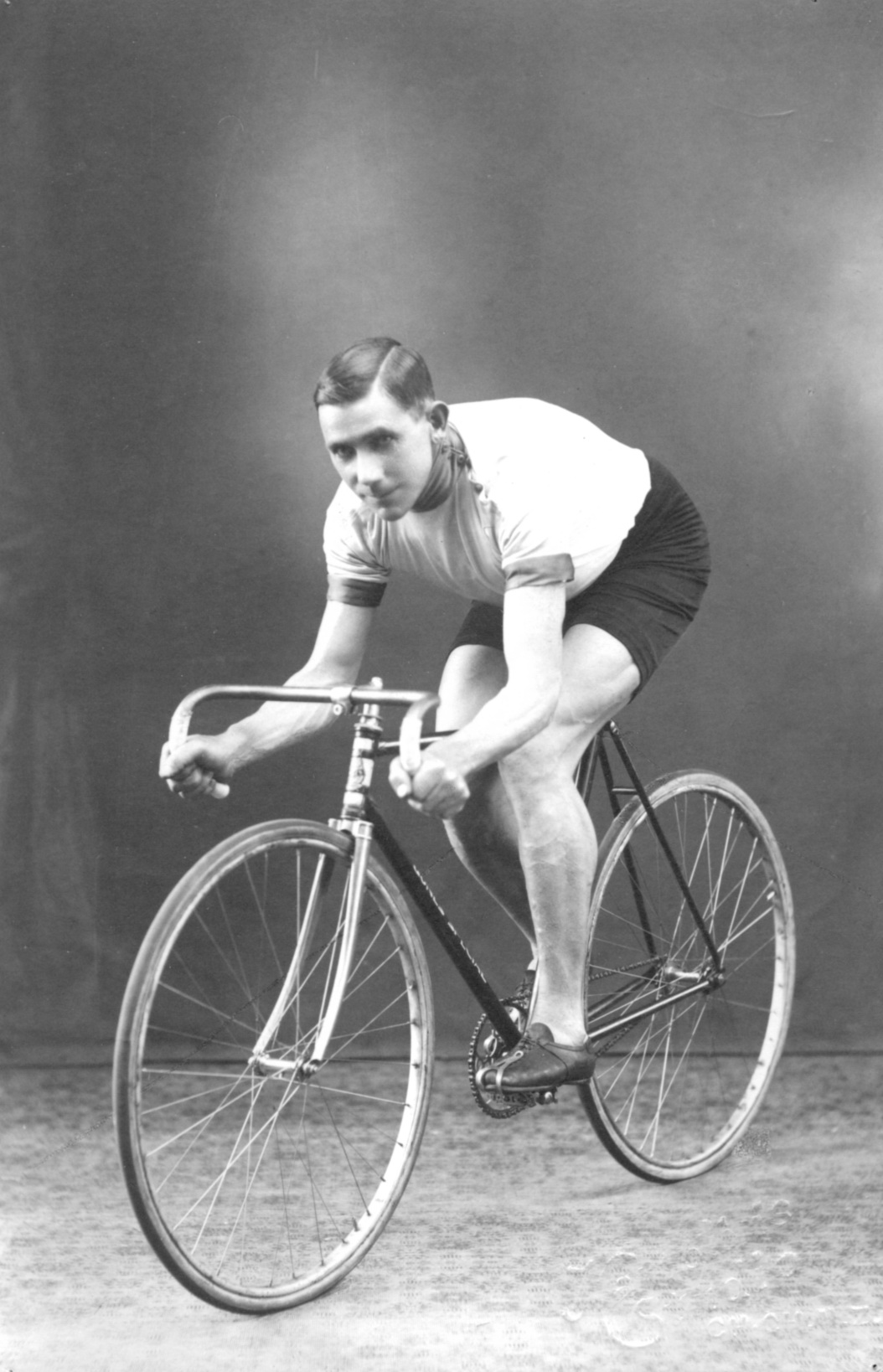
- Born: 16 April 1889; Ashburton, New Zealand
- Died: 1980 (aged 91), at Christchurch, New Zealand
- Height: 5' 5¾"

Phil O'Shea (16 April 1889 – 1980) was a New Zealand racing cyclist.

== Early life ==
O'Shea was born in 1889 in Ashburton, a town in Canterbury, New Zealand.

== Cycling career ==
O'Shea was known as The Champion. The highlight of O'Shea's career was setting the fastest time, on three consecutive occasions, in the Warrnambool to Melbourne race over a distance of 165 miles (266 km), which carried with it the title of Long Distance Road Champion of Australasia. The achievement was all the more remarkable by the 11-year gap between the first race in 1911 and the second race in 1922, mostly accounted for by the intervention of World War I. O'Shea again set the fastest time in 1923.

== New Zealand racing ==
Phil O’Shea was an active cyclist and was racing from 1909 to 1932; a remarkably long time. In that period he raced an estimated 1420 times both on the road and on the track. He won numerous events. On the track he held at various times the New Zealand record for all distances from a quarter of a mile up to five miles. Apart from the Australian road races mentioned above, he won or gained fastest time in several Timaru to Christchurch races, (about 100 miles) and a number of shorter road races.

== War service ==
O'Shea enlisted with the New Zealand Expeditionary Force and served as a despatch rider.

== Bibliography ==
- Kennett, Jonathan; Wall, Bronwen (2005). Phil O'Shea: Wizard on Wheels (New Zealand Cycling Legends Book 1). Kennett Bros. ISBN 0-9583490-8-8.
