= Max Rowley =

Personal information
- Full name: Harold Maxwell Rowley
- Born: 29 May 1923 Maffra
- Died: 12 August 1987 (aged 64) Maffra

Cycling career
- Sport: Cycling
- Role: Rider

Max Rowley (29 May 1923 - 12 August 1987) was an Australian racing cyclist.

== Career highlights ==
1946
4th in Victorian Cycling Grand Prix
1948
1st and fastest Tour of Gippsland
3rd in Australian national road race title
1950
1st in Melbourne to Warrnambool Classic
3rd in Stage 4 part a Tour of the West
2nd in Stage 5 part a Tour of the West, Penrith
1st in Stage 5 part b Tour of the West, Sydney
1st in General Classification Tour of the West
1951
1st in Stage 1 Tour of the West, Dubbo
1st in Stage 5 Tour of the West, Mudgee
6th in General Classification Tour of the West
1952
3rd in Australian national road race title
2nd in Stage 5 'Sun' Tour of Victoria
2nd in General Classification 'Sun' Tour of Victoria

== Australian professional cycling career ==
Rowley won the Blue Riband for the fastest time in the Melbourne to Warrnambool Classic in 1950 and finished 3rd in the Australian national road race title on two occasions, in 1948, over the first 150 miles (240 km) of the Melbourne to Warrnambool Classic and in 1952 in the championship race at Centennial Park.

Max's brother Keith Rowley was also a successful cyclist, twice winning the Australian national road race title in 1947 and 1950 and winning the blue riband for the fastest time in the Warrnambool in 1947. Max and Keith finished 1st and fastest and 2nd and 2nd fastest respectively in the 1948 Tour of Gippsland.
