= Lucinda Stewart =

Australian cyclist (born 2004)

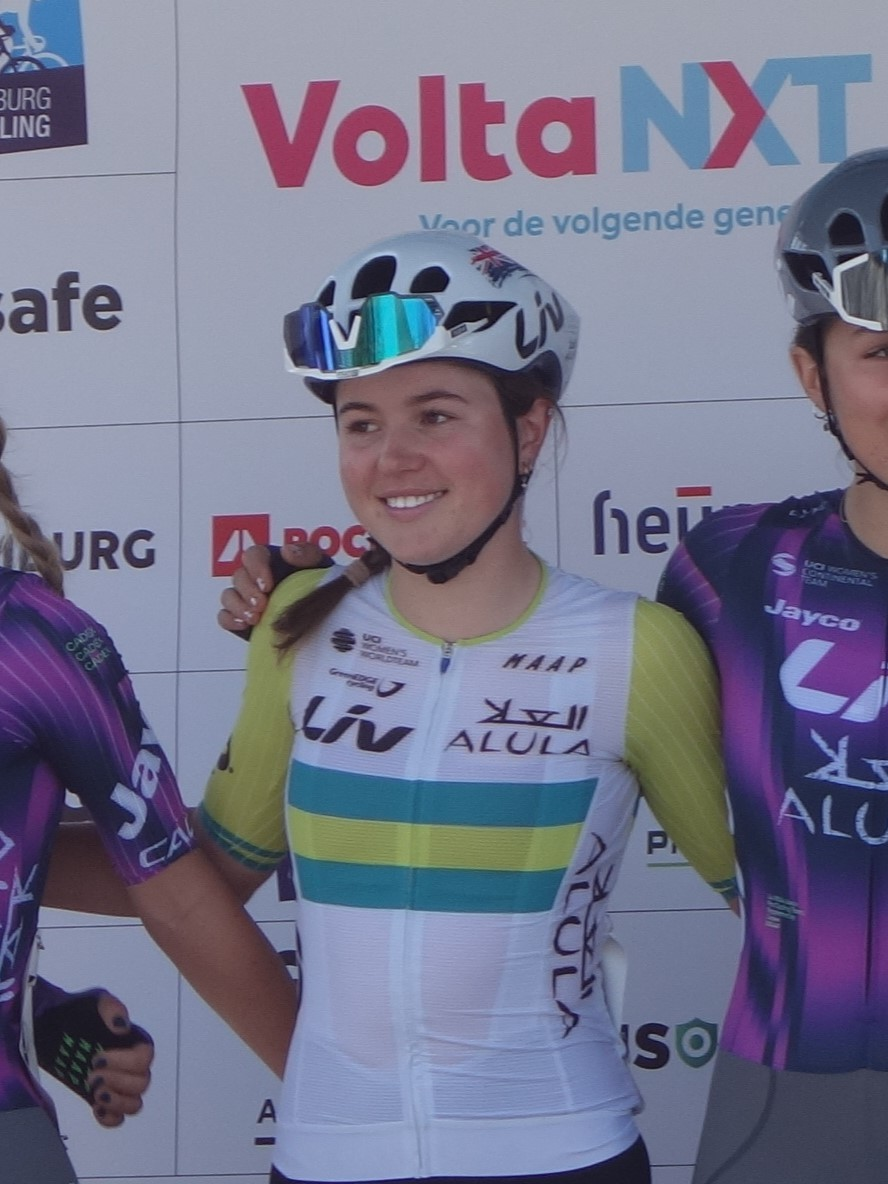
- Stewart in 2025

Personal information
- Born: 1 December 2004 (age 21) Melbourne, Australia

Cycling career
- Sport: Cycling
- Current team: Liv AlUla Jayco Women's Continental Team
- Disciplines: Road; Track
- Role: Rider

Professional teams
- 2023–2024: ARA Skip Capital
- 2025–: Liv AlUla Jayco Women's Continental Team

Major wins
- One-day races and Classics National Road Race Championships (2025)

Lucinda Stewart (born 1 December 2004) is an Australian professional cyclist, who currently rides for Liv AlUla Jayco Women's Continental Team. She won the Australian National Road Race Championships in 2025 and the Melbourne to Warrnambool Classic in 2024.

== Major results ==
2021
National Junior Road Championships

2nd Road race
4th Time trial

2022
National Junior Road Championships

2nd Road race
3rd Time trial

2023
Oceania Track Championships

2nd Scratch
3rd Team pursuit

2nd Time trial, National Under-23 Road Championships
2024
1st Melbourne to Warrnambool Classic
3rd Région Pays de la Loire Tour
2025
1st Road race, National Road Championships
