= Steve Williams (cyclist) =

Australian cyclist

Personal information
- Full name: Steve Williams
- Born: 8 May 1973 (age 53)
- Height: 189 cm (6 ft 2 in)
- Weight: 76 kg (168 lb)

Cycling career
- Sport: Cycling
- Current team: Retired
- Discipline: Road
- Role: Rider

Amateur team
- Monsummanesse

Professional team
- Cycling 2000

Steve Williams (born 8 May 1973) is an Australian former racing cyclist. He won the Australian national road race title in 2001.

== Major results ==
1995
1st NSW State Road Championships
4th Commonwealth Bank Cycling Classic (Leading Australian)
1997
3rd Road race, National Road Championships
3rd Australian Time Trial Championships
1st NSW State Road Championships
1998
5th Gran Premio della Liberazione
2000
1st Stage 4 Herald Sun Tour
1st NSW State Road Championships
2001
1st Road race, National Road Championships
7th Overall Herald Sun Tour
