= Kathleen Shannon (cyclist) =

Australian cyclist

Kathleen Shannon (Kathleen Bazzano)
Personal information
- Full name: Kathleen Shannon
- Born: 20 September 1964 (age 62)

Cycling career
- Sport: Cycling
- Role: Rider
Medal record
Road racing
Representing Australia
Commonwealth Games
Bronze medal – third place	1990 Auckland	Women's Road Race

Kathleen Shannon (born 20 September 1964) is a former Australian racing cyclist. She won the Australian national road race title in 1990 and 1991. She won a bronze medal in the road race at the 1990 Commonwealth Games.

She also competed in the road race at the 1988 and 1992 Summer Olympics.
