= Symenko Jochinke =

Australian cyclist

Personal information
- Full name: Symenko Jochinke
- Born: 12 July 1974 (age 52)

Cycling career
- Sport: Cycling
- Role: Rider

Symenko Jochinke (born 12 July 1974) is a former Australian racing cyclist. She won the Australian national road race title in 1997.
