= Bill Lawrie =

Australian cyclist (1934–1997)

Personal information
- Full name: Bill Lawrie
- Born: 25 August 1934 Brisbane, Australia
- Died: 24 November 1997 (aged 63)

Cycling career
- Sport: Cycling
- Role: Rider

Professional team
- Tour De France 1967: Falcon British Team 1970-71

Major wins
- Herald Sun Tour 1963

Bill Lawrie (25 August 1934 – 24 November 1997) was an Australian racing cyclist. In 1963, he won the Herald Sun Tour. He finished in second place in the Australian National Road Race Championships in 1964. He rode in the 1967 Tour de France for Team Great Britain and did not start in stage 7. In 1969, he won the British National Road Race Championships.
