= John Trevorrow =

Australian cyclist

Personal information
- Born: 18 May 1949 (age 77) Melbourne, Australia

Cycling career
- Sport: Cycling
- Discipline: Road
- Role: Rider (retired); Race director
Medal record
Representing AUS
Men's cycling
Commonwealth Games
Bronze medal – third place	1970 Edinburgh	Men's Road Race

John Kenneth Trevorrow (born 18 May 1949) is a former Australian racing cyclist. He won the Australian national road race title in 1978, 1979 and 1980. He also competed at the 1972 Summer Olympics.

He is presently the race director for the Herald Sun Tour, an Australian stage race on the UCI Oceania Tour. He founded the Bay Classic Series in 1989 and is the current race director.
