= Clyde Sefton =

Australian cyclist (born 1951)

Personal information
- Born: 20 January 1951 (age 75) South Purrumbete, Victoria
Medal record
Men's cycling
Representing Australia
Olympic Games
| Silver medal – second place | 1972 Munich | Road Race |
Commonwealth Games
| Gold medal – first place | 1974 Christchurch | Road Race |

Kevin "Clyde" Sefton (born 20 January 1951) is a former road racing cyclist from Australia, who was a professional rider from 1972 to 1983. He represented his native country at the 1972 Summer Olympics in Munich, West Germany, where he won the silver medal in the men's individual road race, behind the Netherlands' Hennie Kuiper. He also competed at the 1976 Summer Olympics.

He won the Australian national road race title in 1981.

== Major results ==
1972
2nd Road race, Olympic Games
1974
Giro Ciclistico d'Italia

1st Stages 6 & 10b

1978
Herald Sun Tour

1st Stages 3a & 7a

2nd Gran Piemonte
2nd Giro di Romagna
10th Milan-San Remo
1979
1st Stage 6 Herald Sun Tour
6th Giro dell'Emilia
1981
1st Overall Herald Sun Tour

1st Stages 10, 12 & 21

1st Road race, National Road Championships
1982
2nd Overall Herald Sun Tour

1st Stages 4a & 8

1983
Herald Sun Tour

1st Stages 1, 7 & 17
