= Phil Thomas (cyclist) =

Australian cyclist (1916–2004)

Personal information
- Full name: Philip Lloyd Thomas
- Born: 8 October 1916 Kalgoorlie, Australia
- Died: 18 April 2004 (aged 87) Adelaide, Australia

Cycling career
- Sport: Cycling
- Discipline: Road / Track
- Role: Rider

Professional team
- Super Elliot

Phil Thomas (8 October 1916 – 18 July 2004) was an Australian amateur and professional racing cyclist who competed on both road and track.

== Amateur cycling career ==
As an amateur, Thomas won a number of state and national championships on the track and road, including the Australian half-mile senior sprint championship held in Hobart in 1935, aged 18.

After placing 2nd behind Olympic gold medalist and world record holder Dunc Gray in the 1000-metre time trial at the Australian amateur track championships held in Melbourne in 1937, Thomas was selected for the Australian team to compete at the 1938 British Empire Games held in Sydney. He was controversially then dropped from the team after doubts were raised about his amateur status whilst a junior, despite Thomas providing a statutory declaration that he had never competed as a professional.

== Professional career ==
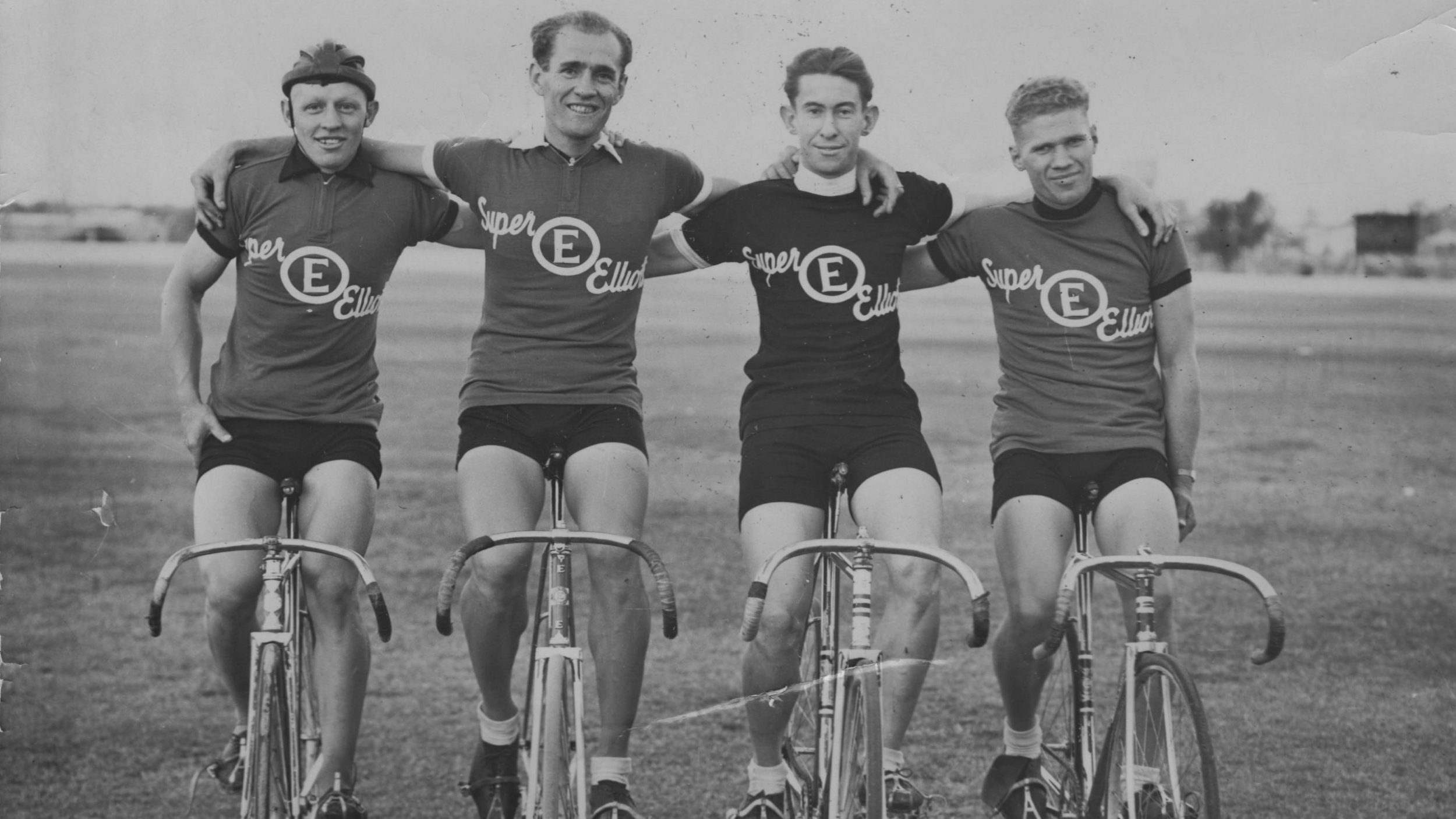
Super Elliot professional cycling team in the 1930s. Phil Thomas is 2nd from the right.

After being overlooked for the Empire Games, Thomas chose to turn professional in 1938, joining Dean Toseland and Keith Thurgood in the Super Elliot team based in Adelaide, but with the outbreak of World War Two most professional racing was suspended for the period 1939-1945.

In 1946, Thomas won the Victorian Cycling Grand Prix, in that year Australia's longest and richest one-day road classic, over 195 miles from Bendigo to Melbourne. Thomas was named the "outstanding professional roadman in Australia in 1946" by the Sporting Globe following his victory in the race.
