= Calvin Watson =

Australian cyclist

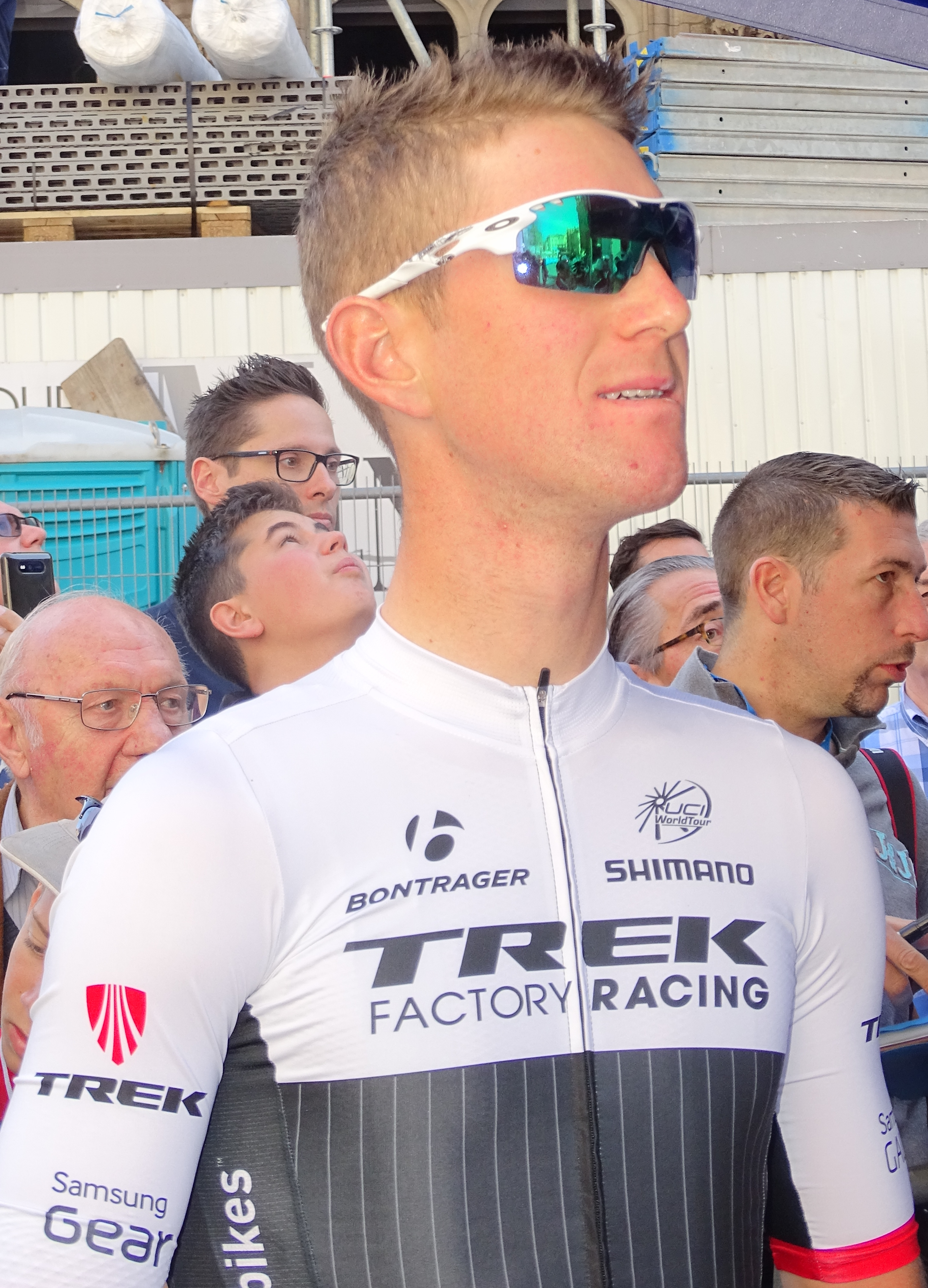
- Watson at the 2015 Brabantse Pijl.

Personal information
- Full name: Calvin Watson
- Born: 6 January 1993 (age 33) Australia
- Height: 192 cm (6 ft 4 in)
- Weight: 71 kg (157 lb)

Cycling career
- Sport: Cycling
- Current team: Retired
- Discipline: Road
- Role: Rider

Amateur team
- 2013: Food Italia Mg K Vis Norda

Professional teams
- 2012: Team Jayco–AIS
- 2014–2015: Trek Factory Racing
- 2016: An Post–Chain Reaction
- 2017–2018: Aqua Blue Sport

Calvin Watson (born 6 January 1993) is an Australian former professional cyclist, who rode professionally between 2012 and 2018 for the Team Jayco–AIS, Trek Factory Racing, An Post–Chain Reaction and Aqua Blue Sport teams.

== Major results ==
2010
3rd Road race, National Junior Road Championships
6th Road race, UCI Juniors Road World Championships
2011
1st Road race, National Junior Road Championships
1st Overall Tour du Valromey
2012
3rd Road race, National Under-23 Road Championships
4th Overall Giro della Regione Friuli Venezia Giulia
8th Trofeo Città di San Vendemiano
8th Trofeo Alcide Degasperi
10th Overall New Zealand Cycle Classic
2013
1st Overall Herald Sun Tour
10th Trofeo Città di San Vendemiano
