= Graham Rowley (cyclist) =

Australian racing cyclist

Personal information
- Full name: Graham Rowley
- Born: 12 May 1940 (age 86) Traralgon, Australia

Cycling career
- Sport: Cycling
- Role: Rider

Graham Rowley (born 12 May 1940) is a former Australian racing cyclist. He won the Australian national road race title in 1974.
