= Tristan Priem =

Australian racing cyclist

Personal information
- Full name: Tristan Priem
- Born: 12 February 1976 (age 50) Mitcham, Australia

Cycling career
- Sport: Cycling
- Role: Rider

Tristan Priem (born 12 February 1976) is a former Australian racing cyclist. He finished in second place in the Australian National Road Race Championships in 1997.
