= Peter Besanko =

Australian cyclist

Personal information
- Full name: Peter Besanko
- Born: 7 January 1955 (age 71) Melbourne, Australia

Cycling career
- Sport: Cycling
- Role: Rider

Peter Besanko (born 7 January 1955) is a former Australian racing cyclist. He won the Australian national road race title in 1976 and 1984. He was the first and fastest in the Melbourne to Warrnambool Classic on three occasions, in 1984, 1989 and 1992. He won the Herald Sun Tour in 1976.
