= Tom Larcombe =

Australian racing cyclist

Personal information
- Full name: Tom Larcombe
- Born: 1881 Argyle County
- Died: 1967 (aged 85–86) Campsie

Cycling career
- Sport: Cycling
- Role: Rider

Tom Larcombe (1881-1967) was an Australian racing cyclist with notable success in long distance road races.

== Career highlights ==
1904
1st Australian national road race title and
Blue Riband for fastest in the Warrnambool to Melbourne Classic
1906
1st Bathurst to Sydney
1907
1st Australian national road race title and
Blue Riband for fastest in the Warrnambool to Melbourne Classic
1908
Fastest Goulburn to Sydney Classic

== Australian professional cycling career ==
Larcombe twice won the Australian national road race title by winning the Blue Riband for the fastest time in the Warrnambool to Melbourne Classic in 1904 and 1907. In 1904 Larcombe finished second off a handicap of 20 minutes, riding the 165 miles (266 km) in a time of 7h 48' 7" and his prizes were a Speedwell bicycle for finishing 2nd and a Massey-Harris bicycle for the fastest time. In 1907 Larcombe was riding from scratch in a new course record of 7h 40' 10" and his prize for the fastest time was another Massey-Harris bicycle. In 1908 Larcombe was unable to repeat his earlier success, finishing 87th after losing 16 minutes due to a puncture. He continued to compete in the Warrnambool finishing 89th in 1909 and 67th in 1910.

In 1906 Larcombe won the Bathurst to Sydney covering the 133.5 miles (214.8 km) in 9h 11' 5".

Larcombe lived in Goulburn and was a regular competitor in the Goulburn to Sydney Classic. He only set the fastest time once, in 1908, riding from scratch, setting a new course record of 6h 35' 56" for the 131.5 miles (211.6 km). His prize? Another Massey-Harris bicycle. He also received his expenses to travel to the Warrnambool to Melbourne. In 1904 Larcombe finished 3rd and had the 2nd fastest time behind Jack Arnst. In 1905 Larcombe finished well back in 36th. In 1906 Larcombe was the lone scratch rider and his arrival was not officially recorded, having been 1h 20' behind the leaders at Liverpool. Larcombe was 22nd in 1907 and 32nd in 1909.
