= Jane Slack-Smith =

Australian cyclist

Personal information
- Born: 27 August 1966 (age 60)

Cycling career
- Sport: Cycling
- Role: Rider

Jane Mary Slack-Smith (born 27 August 1966) is a former Australian racing cyclist. She won the Australian national road race title in 1989.
