= Neil Peadon =

Australian racing cyclist

Personal information
- Full name: Neil Peadon

Cycling career
- Sport: Cycling
- Role: Rider

Neil Peadon was an Australian racing cyclist. He won the Australian national road race title in 1952.
