= Patrick Lane (cyclist) =

Australian cyclist

Personal information
- Born: 28 August 1991 (age 35) Carlton, Victoria, Australia

Cycling career
- Sport: Cycling
- Current team: Retired
- Discipline: Road
- Role: Rider

Amateur teams
- 2013: Food Italia Mg K Vis Norda (until 14/7)
- 2018: Inform Make NRS
- 2022: Carnegie Caulfield Cycling Club

Professional teams
- 2010–2012: Team Jayco–AIS
- 2013–2014: Synergy Baku Cycling Project
- 2014–2015: African Wildlife Safaris
- 2016–2017: Avanti IsoWhey Sports

Patrick Lane (born 28 August 1991 in Carlton) is an Australian former professional cyclist.

== Major results ==
2010
1st Stage 3 Tour of Geelong
2011
1st Stage 5 Giro del Friuli Venezia Giulia
2nd Overall Tour of Wellington
3rd Trofeo Città di San Vendemiano
2015
3rd Overall National Capital Tour
2016
1st Grafton to Inverell Classic
3rd National Road Race Championships
