= David Allan (cyclist) =

Australian cyclist

Personal information
- Full name: David Allan
- Born: 15 April 1956 Melbourne, Australia
- Died: 6 June 1989 (aged 33) Melbourne, Australia

Cycling career
- Sport: Cycling
- Role: Rider

David Allan (15 April 1956 – 6 June 1989) was an Australian racing cyclist. He finished in second place in the Australian National Road Race Championships in 1979. He was the first and fastest in Melbourne to the Warrnambool Classic on three occasions, in 1976, 1979, and 1982. He won the Herald Sun Tour in 1980, and the Austral Wheel Race in 1976 off a handicap of 70 yards (64 m).
