= Harold Johnson (cyclist) =

Australian cyclist

Personal information
- Full name: Harold Johnson

Cycling career
- Sport: Cycling
- Role: Rider

Harold Johnson is a former Australian racing cyclist. He finished in second place in the Australian National Road Race Championships in 1950.
