= Fred Roche (cyclist) =

Australian cyclist

Personal information
- Full name: Fred Roche

Cycling career
- Sport: Cycling
- Role: Rider

Fred Roche was an Australian racing cyclist. He won the Australian national road race title in 1959 and 1960.
