= Jacqui Uttien =

Australian cyclist

Personal information
- Full name: Jacqueline Marie Dina Uttien
- Born: 11 December 1964 (age 61) Eldoret, Kenya

Cycling career
- Sport: Cycling
- Role: Rider

Jacqui Uttien (born 11 December 1964) is a former Australian racing cyclist. She finished in second place in the Australian National Road Race Championships in 1990. She also competed in the women's road race at the 1992 Summer Olympics.
