= Paul Miller (cyclist) =

Australian racing cyclist

Personal information
- Full name: Paul Miller
- Born: 12 February 1963 (age 63) Kalgoorlie, Australia

Cycling career
- Sport: Cycling
- Role: Rider

Paul Miller (born 12 February 1963) is a former Australian racing cyclist. He won the Australian national road race title in 1988.
