= Alby Saunders =

Australian cyclist

Personal information
- Full name: Albert William Saunders
- Born: 2 January 1922 Footscray, Victoria
- Died: 17 April 1998 (aged 76) Yea, Victoria

Cycling career
- Sport: Cycling
- Role: Rider

Alby Saunders (1922–1998) was an Australian racing cyclist.

== Career highlights ==
1947
Fastest Tour of Gippsland
1949
1st Australian national road race title
Blue Riband for fastest in the Melbourne to Warrnambool Classic
4th General Classification Tour of the West
1950
8th General Classification Tour of the West
1951
9th General Classification Tour of the West
1952
3rd Stage 1 'Sun' Tour of Victoria, Geelong
2nd Stage 2 'Sun' Tour of Victoria, Bendigo
3rd Stage 3 'Sun' Tour of Victoria Cobram
1st Stage 4 'Sun' Tour of Victoria, Melbourne
8th General Classification 'Sun' Tour of Victoria
1953
1st Australian national road race title
Blue Riband for fastest in the Melbourne to Warrnambool Classic

== Australian professional cycling career ==
He twice won the Australian national road race title in 1949, by winning a sprint point 150 miles (240 km) into the Melbourne to Warrnambool Classic and in 1953 by winning the championship race over 125 miles (201 km) at Launceston, Tasmania.

Saunders won the Blue Riband for the fastest time in the Melbourne to Warrnambool in 1949 and 1953.

In 2010 the Footscray cycling club held an Alby Saunders Memorial criterium.
