= Margaret Hemsley =

Australian cyclist

Personal information
- Full name: Margaret Hemsley
- Born: 11 August 1971 (age 55) Canberra, Australia

Cycling career
- Sport: Cycling
- Role: Rider

Margaret Hemsley (born 11 August 1971) is an Australian former racing cyclist. She won the Australian national road race title in 2002.
