= Jack Arnst =

New Zealand cyclist

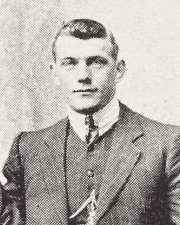
- Arnst, c. 1909

Personal information
- Full name: John Arnst
- Born: 3 February 1882 Tai Tapu, New Zealand
- Died: 25 August 1918 (aged 36)
- Height: 5 ft 9 in (175 cm)
- Weight: 179 lb (81 kg)

Cycling career
- Sport: Cycling
- Disciplines: Road racing & Endurance
- Role: Rider

Major wins
- Dunlop Road Race (Melbourne-Warrnambool Classic) 1903, Sydney Goulburn Classic 1904, 1905, Timaru - Christchurch 1903, 1909

John Arnst (3 February 1882 – 25 August 1918) was a New Zealand racing cyclist.

== Cycling career ==
Jack Arnst was one of thirteen children born to Hermann and Catharina Arnst. The family lived at Tai Tapu near Christchurch. He, and his brothers Richard, Herman and Bill (William), became champion cyclists both on the road and on the track. Jack and Richard were placed third and fourth respectively in the 1903 Timaru to Christchurch road race which was over a distance of 112 miles (180 km). Jack subsequently was first and fastest, in record time, in the 1903 road race between Warrnambool and Melbourne over a distance of 165 miles (266 km) which carried with it the title of Long Distance Road Champion of Australasia. Some of the credit of this win was due to his brother Richard's unselfish pacing, who finished in 5th place in the second fastest time, that was also inside the previous best time. The brothers returned to Australia in 1904 with Richard finishing in 10th and Jack well back in 25th. In 1905 Jack could only manage 76th with Richard in 77th.

On the brothers second trip to Australia in 1904 they raced in the Goulburn to Sydney Classic with Jack finishing 2nd and setting the fastest time, and Richard finishing 12th. Jack again set the fastest time in 1905, finishing 15th while Richard suffered with cramps.

== Christchurch to Dunedin record ==
On 14 April 1909 Jack Arnst created a new cycling time record over the Christchurch to Dunedin road, a distance which was at that time two hundred and forty-seven miles. Rough shingle roads and unbridged streams and rivers made for hard going but he covered the distance in 12 hours and 31 minutes. His brother, Richard Arnst, and another person paced the rider on motorcycles, and a car followed carrying food and spares. The record was never recognised officially as the Arnst team had failed to include an observer from the League of Wheelmen who controlled such matters. However nobody ever made a faster run until such time as the road conditions were improved and the distance somewhat shortened with road realignment.

== War service and death ==
Arnst enlisted with the New Zealand Expeditionary Force and served as a private with the Canterbury Regiment. He was killed in action at Bapaume on 25 August 1918 during the Second Battle of Bapaume and is buried at Grévillers British Cemetery. His name appears on three war memorials in New Zealand: one at Takapau, Hawkes Bay; one at Spotswood, North Canterbury; and on a World War I honours board inside the Ladbrooks community hall, near where he grew up.

== Major results ==
1902
3rd and 3rd fastest time Timaru to Christchurch Road Race
1903
1st and fastest time Melbourne to Warrnambool Classic (Australasian Championship)
2nd and fastest time Timaru to Christchurch Road Race
1904
2nd and fastest time Goulburn to Sydney
25th and 15th fastest time Melbourne to Warrnambool Classic
1905
15th and fastest time Goulburn to Sydney
1906
3rd fastest time Timaru to Christchurch Road Race
1909
12th and fastest time Timaru to Christchurch Road Race

== External resources ==
- Jack Arnst Profile on Cycling Ranking.
