= Graham Stabell =

Australian cyclist (1923–2005)

Personal information
- Full name: Graham Wilson Stabell
- Born: 30 May 1923 Williamstown, Victoria, Australia
- Died: 21 June 2005 (aged 82) Footscray, Victoria, Australia

Cycling career
- Sport: Cycling
- Role: Rider

Graham Wilson Stabell (30 May 1923 – 21 June 2005) was an Australian racing cyclist. He finished in second place in the Australian National Road Race Championships in 1948, 1949, 1951 and 1952.

Stabell won the Blue Ribband for the fastest time in the Melbourne to Warrnambool Classic in 1951 and 1952.

Stabell died on 21 June 2005, at the age of 82.
