= Wayne Hildred =

New Zealand cyclist (born 1955)

Personal information
- Full name: Wayne Hildred
- Born: 12 September 1955 (age 71) New Plymouth, New Zealand

Cycling career
- Sport: Cycling
- Current team: Retired
- Role: Rider

Professional teams
- 1979: TI–Raleigh–McGregor
- 1981: Boule d'Or–Sunair
- 1981: Fangio–Tönissteiner–OM Trucks–Mavic
- 1982: Mavic - Clemenso
- 1984: Rare Spares
- 1986-1987: Rare Spares

Major wins
- Single-day races and Classics Australian National Road Race Championships (1982, 1986)

Wayne Hildred (born 12 September 1955) is a New Zealand former racing cyclist. He won the Australian national road race title in 1982 and 1986. Although he raced predominantly in Australia he rode as a New Zealander in all races he entered. After a break of 19 years Hildred raced the New Zealand masters Championships where he finished first. Then in 2016 he did the same in Australia winning their masters championship.

== Major results ==
1980
4th Overall Herald Sun Tour
1982
1st Road race, Australian National Road Championships
1st Stage 7 Herald Sun Tour
3rd Omloop van de Vlaamse Scheldeboorden
9th GP Frans Melckenbeek
1983
1st Stage 13 Herald Sun Tour
1986
1st Road race, Australian National Road Championships
1987
2nd Road race, Australian National Road Championships
8th Overall Herald Sun Tour
