= Elizabeth Tadich =

Australian cyclist

Personal information
- Full name: Elizabeth Tadich
- Born: 11 October 1976 (age 50)
- Height: 168 cm (5 ft 6 in)

Cycling career
- Sport: Cycling
- Discipline: Road
- Role: Rider

Major wins
- 2nd World Road Championships 1997, 1st Australian Road National Championships 1995

Elizabeth Tadich (born 11 October 1976) is an Australian former racing cyclist. She won the Australian national road race title in 1995. She also accomplished 2nd in World Championships WE - Road Race ('97). Elizabeth married James Taylor and had two children in 2007 and 2011.
