= Alan Dipple =

Australian cyclist

Personal information
- Full name: Alan Oliver Dipple
- Born: 25 August 1956 (age 70) Johannesburg, South Africa
- Height: 6 ft 3 in (191 cm)

Cycling career
- Sport: Cycling
- Role: Rider
- Rider type: Sprinter

Major wins
- Australian National Road Race Title

Alan Dipple (born 25 August 1956) is a former South African and Australian racing cyclist. He won the Australian National Road Race Championships in 1987.
