= Lynn Nixon =

Australian cyclist

Personal information
- Full name: Lynn Nixon
- Born: 7 December 1960 (age 65)

Cycling career
- Sport: Cycling
- Role: Rider

Lynn Nixon (born 7 December 1960) is a former Australian racing cyclist. She won the Australian national road race title in 1996.
