= Kerry Hoole =

Australian cyclist (born 1940)

Personal information
- Full name: Kerry Hoole
- Born: 11 June 1940 (age 86) Goulburn, New South Wales, Australia

Cycling career
- Sport: Cycling
- Role: Rider

Kerry Hoole (born 11 June 1940) is a former Australian racing cyclist. He won the Australian national road race title in 1966 and 1973.

Hoole set the fastest time in the Goulburn to Sydney Classic five times (1965–1968 and 1972), which was run in the reverse direction, from Milperra to Goulburn.
