= Murray French =

Australian cyclist

Personal information
- Full name: Murray French

Cycling career
- Sport: Cycling
- Role: Rider

Murray French is a former Australian racing cyclist. He finished in second place in the Australian National Road Race Championships in 1955.
