= Herald Sun Tour =

Australian multi-day road cycling race

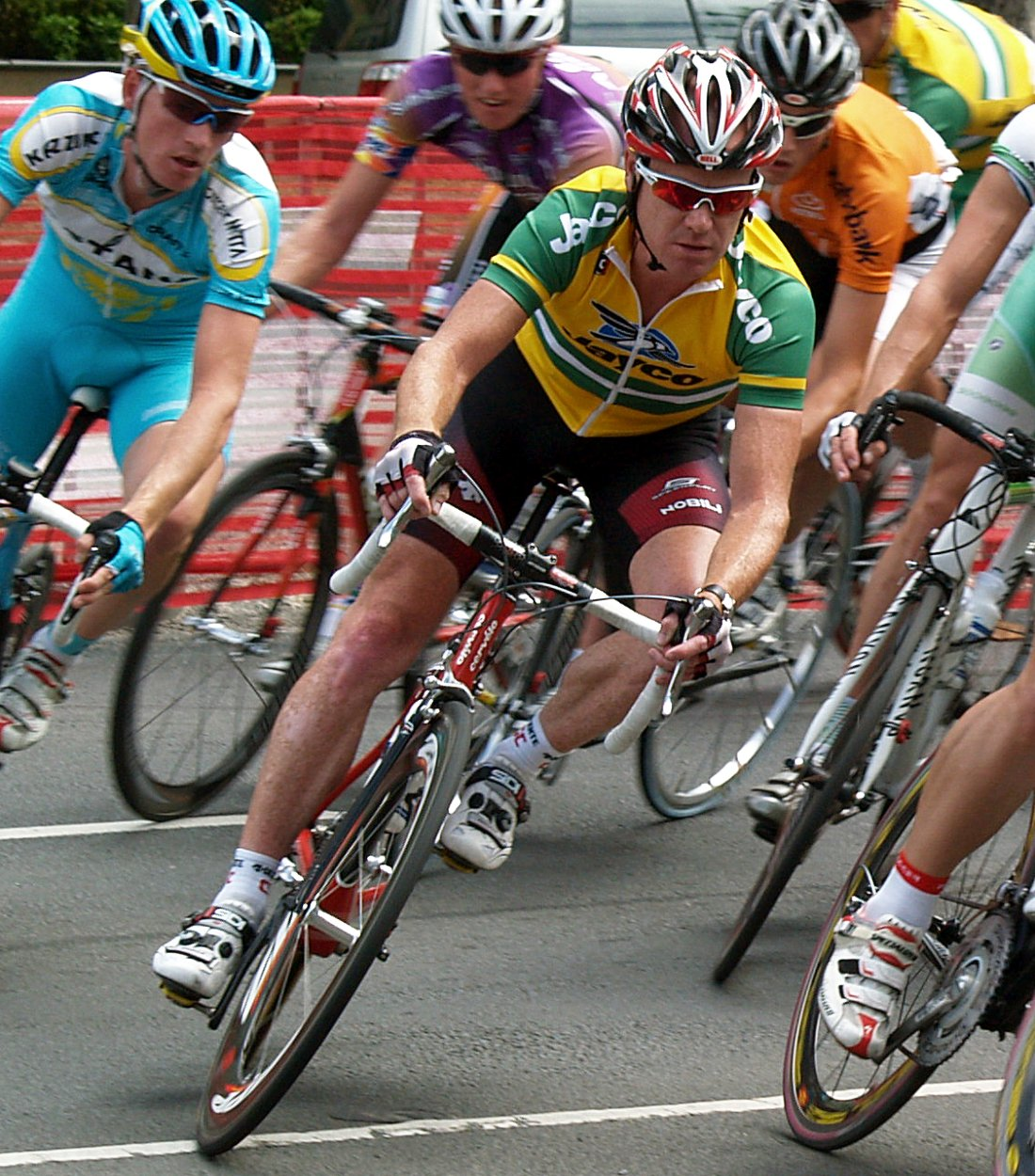
- Herald Sun Tour

Race details
- Date: February
- Region: Victoria, Australia
- Local name: Jayco Herald Sun Tour
- Discipline: Road
- Competition: UCI Oceania Tour (2.1)
- Type: Stage race
- Race director: Scott McGrory
- Web site: www.heraldsuntour.com.au

History
- First edition: 1952
- Editions: 67 (as of 2020)
- First winner: Keith Rowley (AUS)
- Most wins: Barry Waddell (AUS) (5 wins)
- Most recent: Jai Hindley (AUS)

The Herald Sun Tour is an Australian professional bicycle race held in Melbourne and provincial Victoria, sanctioned by the Union Cycliste Internationale (UCI). The first tour was held in October 1952 as a six-day event. It is now held annually over five days in February, though as of 2024 the most recent edition was in 2020. It is named after the Herald Sun, Melbourne's only daily tabloid newspaper. It was originally known as the Sun Tour after The Sun News-Pictorial, and changed its name when The Sun News-Pictorial merged with The Herald in 1990.

== History ==
In 1952 the first general classification winner was Keith Rowley, a Maffra sheep farmer, in a time of 42 h 57 min 55 s. The first King of the Mountain and Sprint champion was Jack (John) McDonough from Coburg.

Australian cyclists dominated the first 30 editions of the race, before its status rose and began attracting overseas stars. By the year 2000, the race had shifted to October and Australia's cyclists racing in Europe began to compete in the race. The resulting rise in the event's standard saw the race become rated by the UCI for the first time in 2005. Several notable Australian cyclists have won the General classification including Stuart O'Grady in 2008, Baden Cooke in 2002, Neil Stephens in 1986, and Russell Mockridge in 1957.

The 2004 race was conducted from 14 to 24 October 2004 and involved 85 cyclists in seventeen teams of five. Thirteen stages were completed with a total distance of 1110.7 km, 119 intermediate sprints and 37 hill climbs, including the two category one climbs of Mount Baw Baw and in the Otway Ranges. Swedish rider Jonas Ljungblad won the General classification in the time of 26 h 39 min 55 s. Karl Menzies won the sprint classification and Phillip Thuaux won the Mountains classification.

After the 2009 race, the organisers of the Herald Sun Tour proposed moving the race from its traditional October date to February, with no edition in 2010. Cycling Australia approved the move, but in the face of opposition from the UCI, the plans never came to fruition. In the end, the 2010 race was "held over" due to the 2010 UCI Road World Championships being held in Geelong and Melbourne, and the race returned to the calendar in October 2011. The UCI accepted a change of date the following year, with a January 2013 date instead of October 2012, but downgraded the race from 2.1 to a National Event, preventing most professional teams from across the world from taking part.

=== 2014 ===
The next edition of the Tour was held from 5–9 February 2014, and regained a UCI 2.1 ranking, permitting top level trade teams to again compete. Due to numerous bushfires across Victoria the last stage of the race was cancelled, with Orica–GreenEDGE rider Simon Clarke declared the winner.

=== 2016 ===
The 63rd edition of the Tour got a huge profile boost when reigning Tour de France champion Chris Froome of Team Sky confirmed he would be starting his 2016 season at the event, having previously participated in 2008 with the Barloworld team where he finished 4th overall. Froome won the overall title on the final stage on Arthurs Seat, making him the first defending Tour de France champion to win the race, with teammate Peter Kennaugh finishing second and Damien Howson of Orica-GreenEdge placing third. He also took the mountains classification.

=== 2017 ===
The 64th edition of the race was won by Damien Howson of Orica–Scott.

=== 2018 ===
The 65th edition of the Herald Sun Tour was won by Esteban Chaves of the World Tour ranked Mitchelton–Scott team. Michelton Scott dominated the general classification of the 2018 edition with teammates Cameron Meyer (2nd) and previous winner Damien Howson (3rd) rounding out the final podium.

=== 2019 ===
The 66th edition of the race was won by Dylan van Baarle of Team Sky. Rounding out the podium were Nick Schultz of Mitchelton–Scott and Michael Woods of EF Education First.

=== 2021 - 2025 ===
In August 2020, the 2021 edition was cancelled due to the uncertainty and unpredictability caused by the impact of COVID-19. The event was rescheduled to February 2022, but was cancelled due to continuing uncertainty around the pandemic.

In October 2022, the 2023 race was cancelled due to "ongoing logistical, planning, timing, and workforce challenges" but the race planned to return for 2024. However it failed to return for the 2024 season.

=== 2026 ===
In April 2025, plans were announced to revive the Australian stage race in February 2026 with a men's and women's race. Former Olympic gold medallists Scott McGrory and Grace Brown becoming the respective race directors. With the upgrade of Surf Coast Classic to UCI ProSeries, Herald Sun Tour would be the sole race of 2026 Oceania tour, as per confirmed by UCI when it published the race in its 2026 calendar in October 2025. However, only 2 weeks later, the organizers announced the race cancellation, citing 'challenged environment in sponsorship and business' as the reason.

== Winners ==
| Year | Country | Rider | Team |
|---|---|---|---|
| 1952 | Australia | Keith Rowley | |
| 1953 | Australia | Basil Halsall | |
| 1954 | Australia | Hector Sutherland | |
| 1955 | Australia | Allan Geddes | |
| 1956 | Australia | George Goodwin | |
| 1957 | Australia | Russell Mockridge | |
| 1958 | Australia | John Young | |
| 1959 | Australia | Peter Panton | |
| 1960 | Australia | Peter Panton | |
| 1961 | Australia | John Young | |
| 1962 | Australia | Bill Knevitt | |
| 1963 | Australia | Bill Lawrie | |
| 1964 | Australia | Barry Waddell | |
| 1965 | Australia | Barry Waddell | |
| 1966 | Australia | Barry Waddell | |
| 1967 | Australia | Barry Waddell | |
| 1968 | Australia | Barry Waddell | |
| 1969 | Australia | Keith Oliver | |
| 1970 | Australia | Trevor Williamson | |
| 1971 | Australia | Graham McVilly | |
| 1972 | Australia | Ken Evans | |
| 1973 | Australia | Graham McVilly | |
| 1974 | Australia | Graham McVilly | |
| 1975 | Australia | John Trevorrow | |
| 1976 | Australia | Peter Besanko | |
| 1977 | Australia | John Trevorrow | |
| 1978 | Australia | Terry Hammond | |
| 1979 | Australia | John Trevorrow | Warracknabeal |
| 1980 | Australia | David Allan | Pony Sport Holland |
| 1981 | Australia | Clyde Sefton | Mansfield |
| 1982 | Australia | Terry Hammond | Clemenso–Mavic |
| 1983 | Australia | Shane Sutton | Clemenso–Mavic |
| 1984 | Australia | Gary Sutton | Clarence Street Cyclery |
| 1985 | Great Britain | Malcolm Elliott | Raleigh–Weinmann |
| 1986 | Australia | Neil Stephens | Repco |
| 1987 | Italy | Stefano Tomasini | Remac–Fanini |
| 1988 | Netherlands | Adri van der Poel | PDM–Ultima–Concorde |
| 1989 | Netherlands | Marcel Arntz | Paternina |
| 1990 | Germany | Udo Bölts | Caltex |
| 1991 | United States | Michael Engleman | Coors Light |
| 1992 | United States | Bart Bowen | Subaru–Montgomery |
| 1993 | Great Britain | David Mann | Coors Light–Serotta |
| 1994 | Germany | Christian Henn | Team Telekom |
| 1995 | United States | Andy Bishop | Echuca-Moama |
| 1996 | United States | Scott Moninger | Tattersall's |
| 1997 | United States | Norman Alvis | Sweethearts Oranges |
| 1998 | Italy | Alessandro Pozzi | Sweethearts Oranges |
| 1999 | Denmark | Michael Blaudzun | home–Jack & Jones |
| 2000 | Kyrgyzstan | Eugen Wacker | Mróz–Supradyn Witaminy |
| 2001 | Austria | Peter Wrolich | Gerolsteiner |
| 2002 | Australia | Baden Cooke | Française des Jeux |
| 2003 | United States | Tim Johnson | Saturn Cycling Team |
| 2004 | Sweden | Jonas Ljungblad | Amore & Vita–Beretta |
| 2005 | Australia | Simon Gerrans | AG2R Prévoyance |
| 2006 | Australia | Simon Gerrans | AG2R Prévoyance |
| 2007 | Australia | Matthew Wilson | Unibet.com |
| 2008 | Australia | Stuart O'Grady | CSC–Saxo Bank |
| 2009 | Great Britain | Bradley Wiggins | Garmin–Slipstream |
| 2010 | No race | | |
| 2011 | Australia | Nathan Haas | Genesys Wealth Advisers |
| 2012 | No race | | |
| 2013 | Australia | Calvin Watson | Jayco-VIS-Apollo |
| 2014 | Australia | Simon Clarke | Orica–GreenEDGE |
| 2015 | Australia | Cameron Meyer | Orica–GreenEDGE |
| 2016 | Great Britain | Chris Froome | Team Sky |
| 2017 | Australia | Damien Howson | Orica–Scott |
| 2018 | Colombia | Esteban Chaves | Mitchelton–Scott |
| 2019 | Netherlands | Dylan van Baarle | Team Sky |
| 2020 | Australia | Jai Hindley | Team Sunweb |
| 2021 | No race | | |
| 2022 | No race | | |
| 2023 | No race | | |
| 2024 | No race | | |
| 2025 | No race | | |
| 2026 | No race | | |
