= Gavin Parsonage =

Australian racing cyclist

Personal information
- Full name: Gavin Parsonage
- Born: 23 October 1968 (age 57)

Cycling career
- Sport: Cycling
- Role: Rider

Gavin Parsonage (born 23 October 1968) is a former Australian racing cyclist. He finished in second place in the Australian National Road Race Championships in 1992 and 1993.
