= John Young (cyclist) =

Australian racing cyclist (1936–2013)

Personal information
- Full name: John Young
- Born: 1936
- Died: 29 January 2013 (aged 76–77)

Cycling career
- Sport: Cycling
- Discipline: Road
- Role: Rider

John Young (1936 – 29 January 2013) was an Australian road racing cyclist.

Young is a four times Australian National Road Race Championships medalist at national championships between 1959 and 1965, winning one silver (1960) and three bronze medals (1959, 1963, 1965).
