= Scott Steward =

Australian cyclist

Personal information
- Full name: Scott Steward
- Born: 13 June 1965 (age 61)

Cycling career
- Sport: Cycling
- Role: Rider

Scott Paul Steward (born 13 June 1965) is a former Australian racing cyclist. He finished in third place in the Australian National Road Race Championships in 1989. He also competed at the 1988 Summer Olympics.
