= Neville Veale =

Australian cyclist

Personal information
- Full name: Neville Veale
- Born: 1939 (age 86–87)

Cycling career
- Sport: Cycling
- Role: Rider

Neville Veale (born 1939) was an Australian racing cyclist. He won the Australian national road race title in 1961.

In 2015 he was inducted into the Goldfields Sporting Hall Of Fame.
