= Mark O'Brien (cyclist) =

Australian cyclist (born 1987)

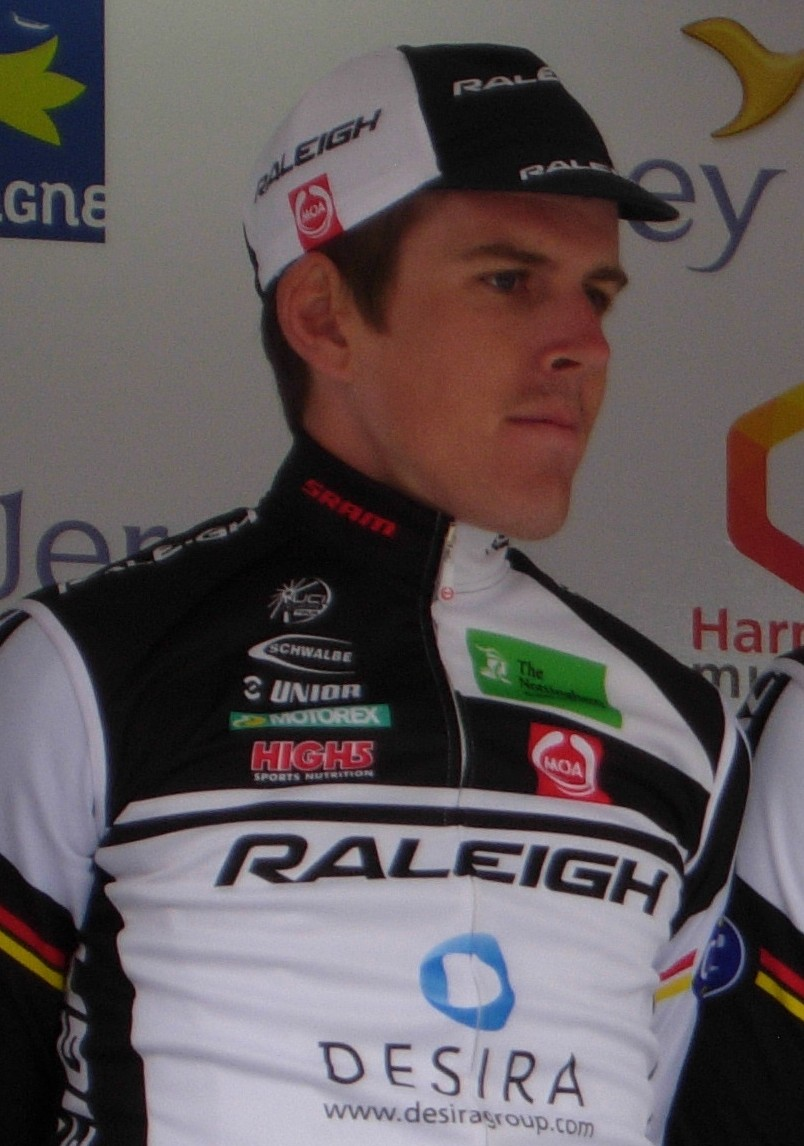
- O'Brien in 2013

Personal information
- Full name: Mark O'Brien
- Born: 16 September 1987 (age 39) Horsham, Australia

Cycling career
- Sport: Cycling
- Discipline: Road
- Role: Rider

Amateur team
- 2020–2022: InForm TM Insight MAKE

Professional teams
- 2007–2009: Drapac–Porsche Development Program
- 2010: LeTua Cycling Team
- 2011: SP Tableware
- 2012: Team Budget Forklifts
- 2013: Team Raleigh
- 2014–2016: Avanti Racing Team
- 2018: Drapac–EF p/b Cannondale Holistic Development Team

Mark O'Brien (born 16 September 1987 in Horsham) is an Australian cyclist, who last rode for Australian amateur team InForm TM Insight MAKE. In 2018 he was the Assistant Sports Director of Drapac EF Cycling. He won the 2024 Melbourne to Warrnambool Cycling Classic.

== Major results ==
2008
3rd Road race, National Under-23 Road Championships
2009
3rd Road race, National Under-23 Road Championships
2010
1st Stage 5 Jelajah Malaysia
2nd Melbourne to Warrnambool Classic
2012
1st Overall Mersey Valley Tour

1st Stage 2

1st Overall Tour of Toowoomba

1st Stage 2

1st Overall North Western Tour

1st Stage 3

2nd Tour of Tasmania
Oceania Cycling Championships

3rd Road race
4th Time trial

2014
2nd Overall Tour of Toowoomba

1st Stage 3 (TTT)

2nd Baw Baw Classic
3rd Overall Battle of the Border

1st stage 1

9th Overall Tour Alsace
2016
2nd New Zealand Cycle Classic
2nd REV Classic
3rd Road race, Oceania Cycling Championships
2020
1st Peaks Challenge Falls Creek
2024
1st Melbourne to Warrnambool Classic
1st Peaks Challenge Falls Creek
2025
1st National Gravel Championships
