= Barry Waddell =

Australian racing cyclist

Personal information
- Full name: Barry Waddell
- Born: 20 October 1936 Western Australia
- Died: 13 April 2024 (aged 87)

Cycling career
- Sport: Cycling
- Disciplines: Track and road

Professional team
- 1963–1970: –

Major wins
- Herald Sun Tour (1964 1965 1966 1967 1968)

Robert "Barry" Waddell (20 October 1936 – 13 April 2024) was an Australian cyclist of the 1960s. Waddell won a record 5 straight Herald Sun Tours from 1964 to 1968. Although best known as a road cyclist, Waddell was in fact an "all-rounder", having also won a number of national track titles. He won the Australian national road race title in 1964 and 1968. He won the general classification in the Herald Sun Tour five years in a row (1964-1968) when the Sun Tour was at its most gruelling, covering 1200 miles (1920 km) in nine days. Waddell took fastest-time honours in the Melbourne-to-Warrnambool road race no fewer than three times and won the Sir Hubert Opperman trophy twice, breaking Opperman's record from Adelaide to Melbourne (22 hours). Subsequently, after his professional cycling career had finished, he also won the 1975 world veterans' title in Austria.

Waddell came to Melbourne in 1956, married in 1960 and has remained a Victorian ever since. He was a dominant road rider for two decades and has earned the title "cycling immortal". Although considered a road specialist, his 17 Australian championship wins included several sprints.

In the Herald Sun Tours typically he would ride up to 100 miles (160 km) in the mornings and again in the afternoons. During one period in 1965, he won the Melbourne-to-Lakes Entrance road race one weekend, followed by his record-breaking Adelaide-Melbourne ride on the Tuesday, achieved fastest time in the Melbourne-to-Warrnambool road race the following Saturday, and then rode throughout a three-day carnival in Port Pirie before commencing the gruelling Herald Sun Tour the following Saturday (which he won), taking 1st place in no fewer than 14 of the 18 stages.

For over 50 years, Waddell operated a bike shop business on the Burwood Highway, Melbourne, until 2011 when he was 74 years of age. Waddell died on 13 April 2024, at the age of 87.

== Palmarès ==
1958
3rd National Road Championship, Elite

1960
3rd Melbourne Six Day

1961
3rd Perth Six Day

1962
2nd Launceston Six Day

1963
1st Perth Six Day (with Ian Campbell)

1964
1st GC Herald Sun Tour
1st National Road Championships Elite
1st National Road Championships Amateurs

Fastest Time Melbourne to Warrnambool

1965
1st GC Herald Sun Tour
1st Launceston Six Day (with Ian Campell)

Fastest Time Melbourne to Warrnambool

1966
1st GC Herald Sun Tour
3rd Launceston Six Day
2nd Whyalla Six Day
2nd Melbourne Six Day
Fastest Time Cootamundra Annual Classic

1967
1st GC Herald Sun Tour
2nd Launceston Six Day
1st Maryborough Six Day (with Sid Patterson)
1st Whyalla Six Day (with Joe Ciavola)

1968
1st GC Herald Sun Tour
2nd Launceston Six Day
1st National Road Championships Elite
1st National Road Championships Amateurs
2nd Melbourne Six Day

Fastest Time Melbourne to Warrnambool

1969
3rd Launceston Six Day
1st Melbourne Six Day (with Ian Stinger)

1970
3rd Melbourne Six Day

1971
1st Wangaratta Wheelrace
2nd in Launceston, Six Day

1975
1st world veterans' title (in Austria)
