= Nicholas White (Australian cyclist) =

Australian road cyclist (born 1997)

Personal information
- Full name: Nicholas White
- Born: 6 September 1997 (age 29) Australia

Cycling career
- Sport: Cycling
- Current team: Team BridgeLane
- Discipline: Road
- Role: Rider

Amateur team
- 2017–2018: Oliver's Real Food Racing

Professional team
- 2019–: Team BridgeLane

Nicholas White (born 6 September 1997) is an Australian professional racing cyclist, who currently rides for UCI Continental team Team BridgeLane.

== Major results ==
2015
7th Road race, National Junior Road Championships
2017
2nd Overall Tour of Gippsland

1st Stage 3

2018
9th Overall Sri Lanka T-Cup
2019
National Under-23 Road Championships

1st Road race
4th Criterium

1st Melbourne to Warrnambool Classic
1st Stage 3 Tour de Taiwan
6th Overall Tour of Southland

1st Stage 5

2020
1st Overall Tour de Taiwan

1st Stage 3

3rd Criterium, National Road Championships
3rd Overall Bay Cycling Classic

1st Stage 2

10th Melbourne to Warrnambool Classic
2021
4th Road race, National Road Championships
