= Donald Wilson (cyclist) =

Australian cyclist

Personal information
- Full name: Donald Wilson
- Born: 16 March 1944 (age 82) Geelong, Australia

Cycling career
- Sport: Cycling
- Role: Rider

Donald Wilson (born 16 March 1944) is a former Australian racing cyclist. He won the Australian national road race title in 1975 and 1977. He also competed in the individual road race and the team time trial events at the 1968 Summer Olympics.

Wilson won and set the fastest time in the amateur Goulburn to Sydney Classic in 1967 run in reverse direction from Milperra to Goulburn.
