= Jessica Mundy =

Australian cyclist

- Born: 25 September 1994 (age 32)
- Spouse: Corey Bounds (m. 2023)

Jessica Mundy
Personal information
- Full name: Jessica Mundy

Cycling career
- Sport: Cycling
- Discipline: Road
- Role: Rider

Amateur teams
- 2015: Wiggle Down Under
- 2016: Fearless Femme Racing
- 2018: The Meteor // Intelligentsia
- 2019: Specialized Wolfpack p/b Jakroo

Professional team
- 2017: Colavita/Bianchi

Jessica Mundy (born 25 September 1994) is an Australian professional racing cyclist.

== Major results ==
2015
Oceania Road Championships

1st Under-23 road race
6th Road race

2016
2nd Road race, Oceania Road Championships

== See also ==
- Wiggle–Honda
