= Karin Wilson =

American mayor

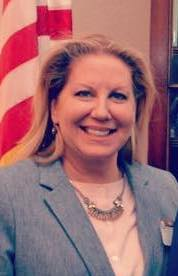
- Wilson in 2018

Mayor of Fairhope, Alabama
- In office November 7, 2016 – 2020

Personal details
- Born: Fairhope, Alabama, U.S.
- Education: Auburn University

Karin Wolff Wilson is an American elected official and served as the mayor of Fairhope, Alabama from November 7, 2016 to August 25, 2020. She was defeated by Sherry Sullivan in the August 25, 2020 municipal election. Wilson's campaign platform focused on community concerns about the city's comprehensive plan, growth strategies, and maintaining Fairhope's quality of life.

== Education ==
Wilson graduated from Fairhope High School and attended Auburn University, where she earned a degree in finance.

== Business career ==
Wilson purchased the Page & Palette Bookstore in 1997. The Page & Palette Bookstore is a family-owned business founded in 1968. She has served as president of the Page & Palette Bookstore, Latte Da Coffee Shop, and The Book Cellar Bar & Event Venue, which are all local businesses in Fairhope.

== Awards and honors ==
- Founded Fairhope Local as an educational campaign to promote community benefits of buying local.
- Created the Good Life Foundation, a community organization that promotes education excellence, school programs, civic involvement, cultural development and student achievement.
- Recognized as a Local Hero in Garden & Gun Magazine in 2011.
- Recognized as one of AL.com's 2014 11 Coastal Alabama Leaders
