= Terry Hammond =

Australian cyclist (born 1957)

Personal information
- Full name: Terry Hammond
- Born: 26 May 1957 (age 69) Sydney, Australia

Cycling career
- Sport: Cycling
- Role: Rider

Terry Hammond (born 26 May 1957) is a former Australian racing cyclist. He won the Australian national road race title in 1983.

== Major results ==
1977
3rd Overall Herald Sun Tour
1978
1st Overall Herald Sun Tour

1st Stages 1b & 6a

1979
2nd Overall Herald Sun Tour
1982
1st Overall Herald Sun Tour

1st Stage 1

1983
1st Road race, National Road Championships
2nd Overall Herald Sun Tour

1st Stages 4, 10 & 14

1984
Herald Sun Tour

1st Stages 8 & 16

1985
1st Stage 14 Herald Sun Tour
