= Keith Rowley (cyclist) =

Australian cyclist

Personal information
- Full name: Keith Rowley
- Born: 1919
- Died: 1982 (aged 62–63) Sale, Australia

Cycling career
- Sport: Cycling
- Role: Rider

Keith Rowley (1919–1982) was an Australian racing cyclist.

== Career highlights ==
1947
1st Australian 150-mile road race title
1st and Blue Riband in the Melbourne to Warrnambool Classic
1948
2nd and 2nd fastest Tour of Gippsland
1949
2nd Australian long distance title of 187 miles
1950
1st Australian National Road Race Championship
2nd in Stage 1 part b Tour of the West, Dubbo
1st in Stage 5 part a Tour of the West, Penrith
2nd in Stage 5 part b Tour of the West, Sydney
3rd in General Classification Tour of the West
1951
8th in General Classification Tour of the West
1952
1st in General Classification Herald Sun Tour
3rd in Stage 5 'Sun' Tour of Victoria Maffra, Victoria
1st in General Classification 'Sun' Tour of Victoria

== Australian professional cycling career ==
He won the Australian 150-mile road race title in 1947, by winning a sprint point 150 miles (240 km) into the Melbourne to Warrnambool Classic and the Australian National Road Race Championship in 1950 by winning the first championship race over 125 miles (201 km) at Cronulla, NSW.

Rowley also won the Blue Riband for the fastest time in the Melbourne to Warrnambool in 1947.

Keith's brother Max Rowley was also a successful cyclist, winning the Blue Riband for the fastest time in the Warrnambool in 1950 and 3rd in the Australian national road race in 1948 and 1952. Max and Keith finished 1st and fastest and 2nd and 2nd fastest respectively in the 1948 Tour of Gippsland.
