= John O'Sullivan (cyclist) =

Australian cyclist (1933–2023)

Personal information
- Full name: John Brendan O'Sullivan
- Nickname: Sully
- Born: 14 March 1933 Melbourne, Victoria, Australia
- Died: 21 April 2023 (aged 90)

Cycling career
- Sport: Cycling
- Disciplines: Road and Track
- Role: Rider
- Rider type: Road

John Brendan O'Sullivan (14 March 1933 – 21 April 2023) was an Australian racing cyclist. He won the Australian national road race title in 1962. He also competed at the 1956 Summer Olympics.
