= David McFarlane (cyclist) =

Australian racing cyclist

Personal information
- Full name: David McFarlane
- Born: 31 August 1959 (age 67)

Cycling career
- Sport: Cycling
- Role: Rider

David McFarlane (born 31 August 1959) is a former Australian racing cyclist. He won the Australian national road race title in 1992.
