= Graham McVilly =

Australian racing cyclist

Personal information
- Full name: Graham McVilly
- Born: 4 May 1948 Hobart, Australia
- Died: 21 April 2002 (aged 53) Huntingfield, Tasmania, Australia

Cycling career
- Sport: Cycling
- Role: Rider

Graham McVilly (4 May 1948 – 21 April 2002) was an Australian racing cyclist. He won the Australian national road race title in 1970 and 1971.

While still a novice, he won his first significant race at the Launceston Wheel Race in 1967. He won the Tasmanian Amateur Road Cycling Championship the next year, demonstrating the adaptability needed to become a great rider. Graham began his career in 1969. He finished second in the prestigious Sun Tour that year and won the Tasmanian Professional Road Championship. He won the Latrobe Wheel, became the Australian Road Cycling champion, and finished second in the Sun Tour once more in 1970.

McVilly died on 21 April 2002 as a result of an equestrian accident while horse riding in an event at Huntingfield, Tasmania.
