= Michael Lynch (cyclist) =

Australian cyclist (born 1963)

Personal information
- Full name: Michael Lynch
- Born: 12 April 1963 (age 63) Melbourne, Australia

Cycling career
- Sport: Cycling
- Role: Rider
Medal record
Representing AUS
Men's cycling
Commonwealth Games
Silver medal – second place	1982 Brisbane	Road team time trial

Michael Lynch (born 12 April 1963) is a former Australian cyclist. Lynch competed at the 1984 Summer Olympics in cycling events. He finished 55th in the men's road race and was placed 14th in the team time trial.
