= Australian National Time Trial Championships =

National road cycling championship in Australia

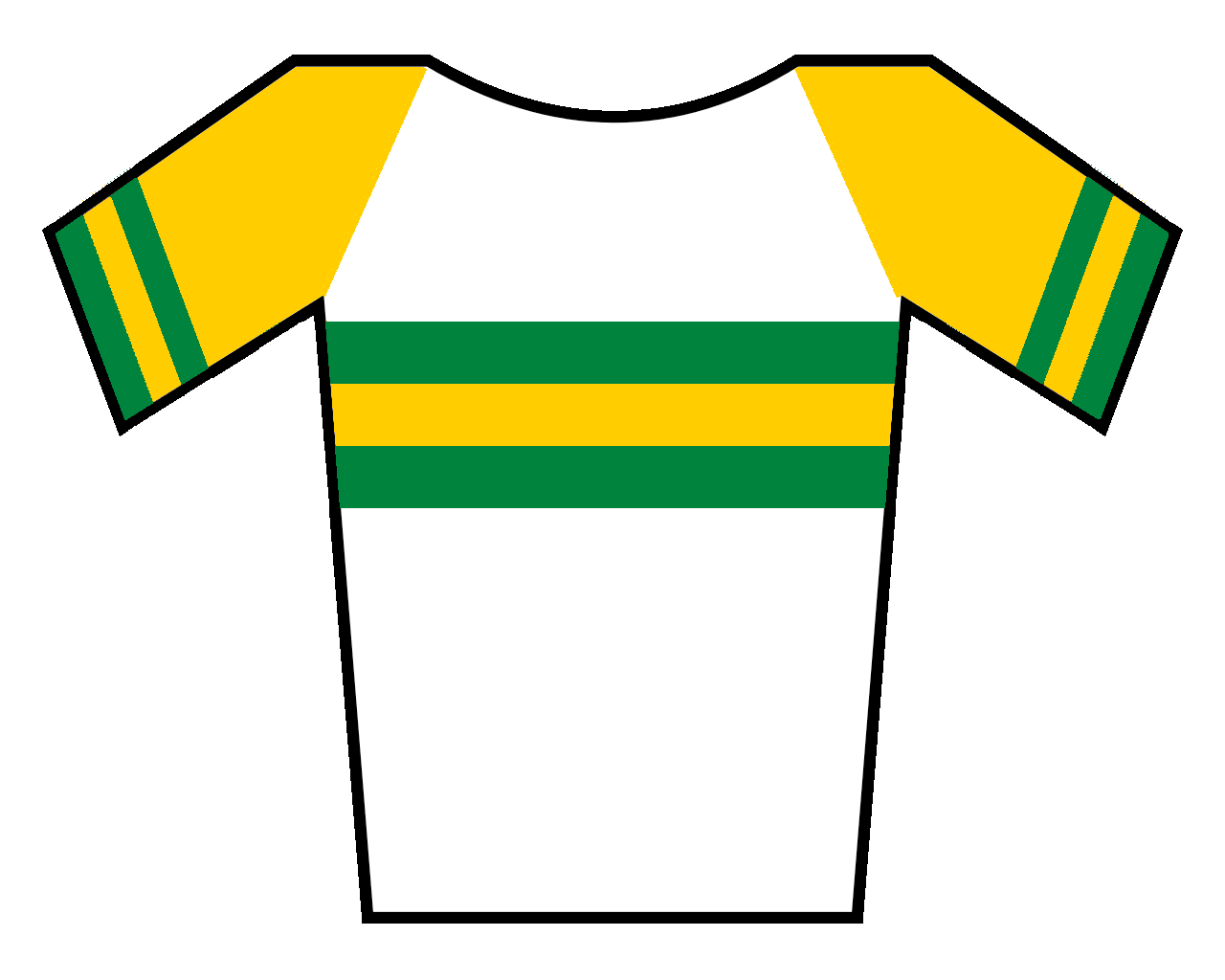
The Champion's Jersey

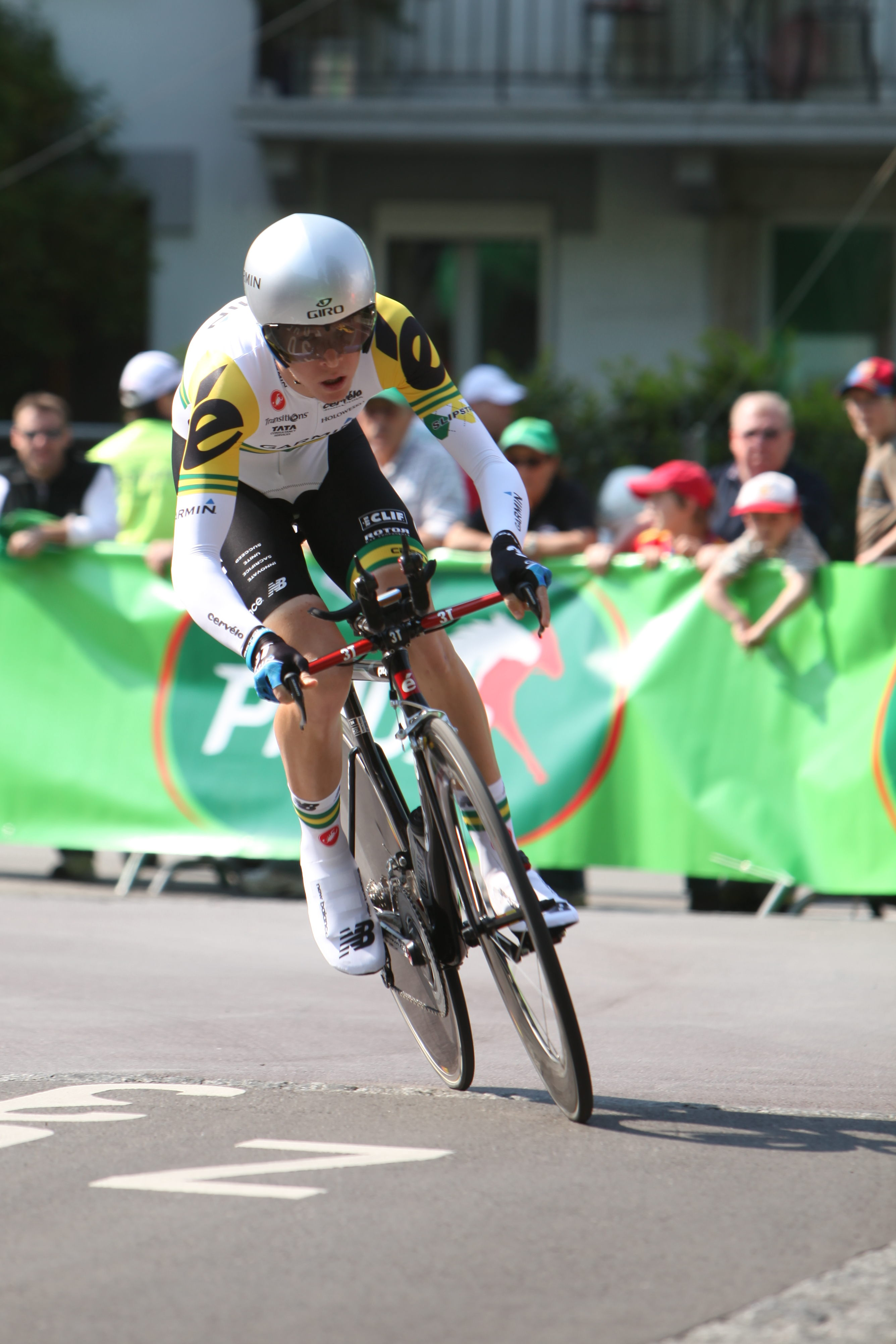
Cameron Meyer

The Australian National Time Trial Championships, are held annually with an event for each category of rider: Men, Women & under 23 riders. The event has been run concurrently with the Australian National Road Race Championships since 2002. The Australian Championships have officially been known as the Scody Australian Open Road Cycling Championships since 1999, taking the name of their main sponsor, but are more commonly referred to as The Nationals. According to Cycling Australia, the under 23 men's time trial championships were introduced in 2001. Gran fondo national championships were introduced in 2016. E-sports made a debut in 2019.

The winners of each event are awarded with a symbolic cycling jersey featuring green and yellow stripes, which can be worn by the rider at other time trialling events in the country to show their status as national champion. The champion's stripes can be combined into a sponsored rider's team kit design for this purpose.

== Multiple winners ==
Men

Wins	Name	Years
8	Nathan O'Neill	1994, 1996, 1998, 2002, 2004, 2005, 2006, 2007
4	Luke Durbridge	2012, 2013, 2019, 2020
4	Rohan Dennis	2016, 2017, 2018, 2022
3	Luke Plapp	2021, 2024, 2025
2	Jonathan Hall	1997, 1999
2	Cameron Meyer	2010, 2011

Women

Wins	Name	Years
5	Kathy Watt	1992, 1993, 1994, 1996, 2006
4	Shara Gillow	2011, 2012, 2013, 2015
4	Grace Brown	2019, 2022, 2023, 2024
3	Anna Millward	1997, 1998, 2001
3	Katrin Garfoot	2016, 2017, 2018
2	Tracey Gaudry	1995, 2000
2	Oenone Wood	2004, 2005
2	Sara Carrigan	2002, 2003
2	Carla Ryan	2007, 2009
2	Sarah Gigante	2020, 2021

== Elite ==
=== Men ===
Year	Gold	Silver	Bronze	Ref.
1994	Nathan O'Neill	Jonathan Hall	Anthony Gaudry	
1995	Matt White	Paul Brosnan	Jonathan Hall	
1996	Nathan O'Neill	Brett Dennis	Matt White	
1997	Jonathan Hall	Jamie Drew	Steve Williams	
1998	Nathan O'Neill	Tom Leaper	Tristan Priem	
1999	Jonathan Hall	Denis Mungoven	Peter Milostic	
2000	cancelled			
2001	Kristjan Snorrason	Denis Mungoven	Russel Van Hout	
2002	Nathan O'Neill	Michael Rogers	Ben Day	
2003	Ben Day	Michael Rogers	Adrian Laidler	
2004	Nathan O'Neill	Peter Milostic	Luke Roberts	
2005	Nathan O'Neill	Rory Sutherland	Russel Van Hout	
2006	Nathan O'Neill	Luke Roberts	Ben Day	
2007	Nathan O'Neill	Rory Sutherland	David Pell	
2008	Adam Hansen	Rory Sutherland	Ben Day	
2009	Michael Rogers	Cameron Meyer	Richie Porte	
2010	Cameron Meyer	Jack Anderson	Luke Roberts	
2011	Cameron Meyer	Jack Bobridge	Michael Matthews	
2012	Luke Durbridge	Cameron Meyer	Michael Rogers	
2013	Luke Durbridge	Rohan Dennis	Michael Matthews	
2014	Michael Hepburn	Luke Durbridge	Damien Howson	
2015	Richie Porte	Rohan Dennis	Jack Bobridge	
2016	Rohan Dennis	Richie Porte	Sean Lake	
2017	Rohan Dennis	Luke Durbridge	Benjamin Dyball	
2018	Rohan Dennis	Luke Durbridge	Richie Porte	
2019	Luke Durbridge	Rohan Dennis	Cameron Meyer	
2020	Luke Durbridge	Rohan Dennis	Chris Harper	
2021	Luke Plapp	Luke Durbridge	Kelland O'Brien	
2022	Rohan Dennis	Luke Durbridge	Conor Leahy	
2023	Jay Vine	Luke Durbridge	Kelland O'Brien	
2024	Luke Plapp	Chris Harper	Michael Hepburn	
2025	Luke Plapp	Jay Vine	Kelland O'Brien	

=== Women ===
Year	Gold	Silver	Bronze	Ref.
1991	Catherine Hart	Ingrid Eadie	Jane McDonald	
1992	Kathy Watt	Ingrid Eadie	Catherine Hart	
1993	Kathy Watt	Anita Crossley	Cathy Reardon	
1994	Kathy Watt	Susan Poidevin	Cathy Reardon	
1995	Tracey Watson	Kathy Watt	Melissa Berryman	
1996	Kathy Watt	Anna Millward	Lynn Nixon	
1997	Anna Millward	Kathy Watt	Ellie Kennedy	
1998	Anna Millward	Kathy Watt	Jodie Brewer	
1999	Kristy Scrymgeour	Kathy Watt	Tracey Gaudry	
2000	Tracey Gaudry	Anna Millward	Kristy Scrymgeour	
2001	Anna Millward	Alison Wright	Sara Carrigan	
2002	Sara Carrigan	Anna Millward	Hayley Rutherford	
2003	Sara Carrigan	Olivia Gollan	Oenone Wood	
2004	Oenone Wood	Sara Carrigan	Kathy Watt	
2005	Oenone Wood	Sara Carrigan	Amy Gillett	
2006	Kathy Watt	Sara Carrigan	Natalie Bates	
2007	Carla Ryan	Kathy Watt	Toireasa Gallagher	
2008	Bridie O'Donnell	Sara Carrigan	Alexis Rhodes	
2009	Carla Ryan	Alexis Rhodes	Kathy Watt	
2010	Amber Halliday	Bridie O'Donnell	Carly Light	
2011	Shara Gillow	Taryn Heather	Ruth Corset	
2012	Shara Gillow	Taryn Heather	Bridie O'Donnell	
2013	Shara Gillow	Grace Sulzberger	Felicity Wardlaw	
2014	Felicity Wardlaw	Shara Gillow	Bridie O'Donnell	
2015	Shara Gillow	Bridie O'Donnell	Taryn Heather	
2016	Katrin Garfoot	Shara Gillow	Tiffany Cromwell	
2017	Katrin Garfoot	Shara Gillow	Kate Perry	
2018	Katrin Garfoot	Lucy Kennedy	Shara Gillow	
2019	Grace Brown	Gracie Elvin	Kate Perry	
2020	Sarah Gigante	Grace Brown	Emily Herfoss	
2021	Sarah Gigante	Grace Brown	Nicole Frain	
2022	Grace Brown	Amber Pate	Lisa Jacob	
2023	Grace Brown	Georgie Howe	Brodie Chapman	
2024	Grace Brown	Brodie Chapman	Georgie Howe	
2025	Brodie Chapman	Amber Pate	Anya Louw	

== Under 23 ==
=== Men ===
Year	Gold	Silver	Bronze	Ref.
2001	Toby Halt	Scott Taylor	Tim Casey	
2002	Jonathan Davis	(Netherlands) Jens Mouris	Lee Godfrey	
2003	Adrian Laidler	Mark Jamieson	Jonathan Davis	
2004	Mark Jamieson	Richard Moffatt	William Walker	
2005	Mark Jamieson	Richard Moffatt	Samuel Lee	
2006	Shaun Higgerson	Mark Jamieson	Miles Olman	
2007	Zakkari Dempster	Hayden Josefski	Miles Olman	
2008	Matt King	Benjamin King	Travis Meyer	
2009	Jack Bobridge	Travis Meyer	Michael Matthews	
2010	Rohan Dennis	Luke Durbridge	Michael Matthews	
2011	Luke Durbridge	Michael Hepburn	Jay McCarthy	
2012	Rohan Dennis	Damien Howson	Campbell Flakemore	
2013	Damien Howson	Alexander Morgan	Campbell Flakemore	
2014	Jordan Kerby	Harry Carpenter	Miles Scotson	
2015	Miles Scotson	Oscar Stevenson	Harry Carpenter	
2016	Callum Scotson	Miles Scotson	Ben O'Connor	
2017	Callum Scotson	Robert Stannard	Michael Storer	
2018	Callum Scotson	Samuel Jenner	Jason Lea	
2019	Liam Magennis	Luke Plapp	Samuel Jenner	
2020	Luke Plapp	Kelland O'Brien	Carter Turnbull	
2021	Carter Turnbull	Conor Leahy	Pat Eddy	
2022	Carter Turnbull	Matthew Dinham	Zac Marriage	
2023	Alastair Mackellar	Oliver Bleddyn	Zac Marriage	
2024	Jackson Medway	Hamish McKenzie	Oscar Chamberlain	
2025	Zac Marriage	Fergus Browning	John Carter	

=== Women ===
Year	Gold	Silver	Bronze	Ref.
2009	Josie Tomic	Shara Gillow	Sarah Kent	
2010	Josie Tomic	Tiffany Cromwell	Alexandra Carle	
2011	Lauren Kitchen	Amy Cure	Carlee Taylor	
2012	Sinead Noonan	Lauren Kitchen	Sarah Kent	
2013	Ailie McDonald	Jessica Allen	Cassandra Dodd	
2014	Jenelle Crooks	Emily Roper	Jessica Allen	
2015	Rebecca Mackey	Ellen Skerritt	Jenelle Crooks	
2016	Emily Roper	Ellen Skerritt	Jenelle Crooks	
2017	Alexandra Manly	Jaime Gunning	Ella Scanlan-Bloor	
2018	Alexandra Manly	Maeve Plouffe	Kerry Jonker	
2019	Sarah Gigante	Anya Louw	Jemma Eastwood	
2020	Sarah Gigante	Jamie Gunning	Emily Watts	
2021	Sarah Gigante	Emily Watts	Anya Louw	
2022	Anya Louw	Alyssa Polites	Emily Watts	
2023	Isabelle Carnes	Lucinda Stewart	Haylee Fuller	
2024	Ella Simpson	Felicity Wilson-Haffenden	Neve Bradbury	
2025	Alli Anderson	Felicity Wilson-Haffenden	Sophia Sammons	

== Junior / Under 19 ==
=== Men ===
Year	Gold	Silver	Bronze	Ref.
2006	Hayden Josefski	Cameron Meyer	Leigh Howard	
2007	Rohan Dennis	Thomas Palmer	Michael Freiberg	
2008	Michael Freiberg			
2009	Luke Durbridge	Dale Parker	Jordan Kerby	
2010	Dale Parker	Jay McCarthy	Ethan Kimmince	
2011	Alexander Morgan	Jack Beckinsale	Caleb Ewan	
2012	Caleb Ewan	Alexander Morgan	Miles Scotson	
2013	Tom Kaesler	Daniel Fitter	Jack Edwards	
2014	Callum Scotson	Lucas Hamilton	Angus Lyons	
2015	Rohan Wight	James Fouché (NZ)	Liam Magennis	
2016	Harry Sweeny			
2017	Thomas Jones	Elliot Schultz	Mitchell Wright	
2018	Luke Plapp	Tyler Londorff	Mitchell Wright	
2019	Patrick Eddy	Harry Morgan	James Moriarty	
2020	Patrick Eddy	Alastair Mackellar	Zac Kelly	
2021	Lachlan Miller	Dylan George	Matthew Connan	
2022	Hamish McKenzie	Cameron Rogers	Lachlan Miller	
2023	Oscar Chamberlain	Wil Holmes	Joshua Cranage	
2024	Wil Holmes	Alex Eaves	Jeremy Smith	
2025	Max Goold	Lucas Stevenson	Fletcher Medway	

=== Women ===
Year	Gold	Silver	Bronze	Ref.
2006	Tiffany Cromwell			
2007	Josie Tomic			
2008	Sophie Ootes			
2009	Kendelle Hodges	Amy Cure	Madeleine Brunton	
2010	Amy Cure	Sinead Noonan	Jessica Allen	
2011	Allison Rice	Jessica Allen	Jessica Mundy	
2012	Emily Roper	Georgia Baker	Kelsey Robson	
2013	Alexandra Manly	Lucy Kirk	Macey Stewart	
2014	Anna-Leeza Hull	Macey Stewart	Alexandra Manly	
2015	Anna-Leeza Hull	Hollee Simmons	Jaime Gunning	
2016	Jaime Gunning			
2017	Madeleine Fasnacht	Anya Louw	Sophie Edwards	
2018	Sarah Gigante	Anya Louw	Sophie Edwards	
2019	Francesca Sewell	Catelyn Turner	Katarina Chung-Orr	
2020	Alyssa Polites	Francesca Sewell	Catelyn Turner	
2021	Alyssa Polites	Haylee Fuller	Isablee Carnes	
2022	Isablee Carnes	Sophie Marr	Lucy Stewart	
2023	Felicity Wilson-Haffenden	Lauren Bates	Talia Appleton	
2024	Lauren Bates	Nicole Duncan	Emily Dixon	
2025	Amelie Sanders	Georgia Gardiner	Leani Van der Berg	

== See also ==
- Australian National Road Race Championships
- Australian National Criterium Championships
- National Road Cycling Championships
