= List of rosters for GreenEDGE–AIS and its successors =

This page lists the rosters, by season, of the UCI Women's Team, Orica–AIS.

== 2021 ==
Ages as of 1 January 2021.

Rider	Date of birth
Jessica Allen (AUS)	April 17, 1993 (aged 27)
Grace Brown (AUS)	July 7, 1992 (aged 28)
Teniel Campbell (TTO)	September 23, 1997 (aged 23)
Janneke Ensing (NED)	September 21, 1986 (aged 34)
Arianna Fidanza (ITA)	January 6, 1995 (aged 25)
Lucy Kennedy (AUS)	July 11, 1988 (aged 32)
Jessica Roberts (GBR)	April 11, 1999 (aged 21)

Rider	Date of birth
Sarah Roy (AUS)	February 27, 1986 (aged 34)
Ane Santesteban (ESP)	December 12, 1990 (aged 30)
Amanda Spratt (AUS)	September 17, 1987 (aged 33)
Moniek Tenniglo (NED)	May 2, 1988 (aged 32)
Georgia Williams (NZL)	August 25, 1993 (aged 27)
Urška Žigart (SLO)	December 4, 1996 (aged 24)

== 2020 ==
Ages as of 1 January 2020.

Rider	Date of birth
Jessica Allen (AUS)	April 17, 1993 (aged 26)
Grace Brown (AUS)	July 7, 1992 (aged 27)
Gracie Elvin (AUS)	October 31, 1988 (aged 31)
Janneke Ensing (NED)	September 21, 1986 (aged 33)
Lucy Kennedy (AUS)	July 11, 1988 (aged 31)
Jessica Roberts (GBR)	April 11, 1999 (aged 20)

Rider	Date of birth
Sarah Roy (AUS)	February 27, 1986 (aged 33)
Amanda Spratt (AUS)	September 17, 1987 (aged 32)
Moniek Tenniglo (NED)	May 2, 1988 (aged 31)
Annemiek van Vleuten (NED)	October 8, 1982 (aged 37)
Georgia Williams (NZL)	August 25, 1993 (aged 26)

== 2019 ==
Ages as of 1 January 2019.

Rider	Date of birth
Jessica Allen (AUS)	April 17, 1993 (aged 25)
Grace Brown (AUS)	July 7, 1992 (aged 26)
Gracie Elvin (AUS)	October 31, 1988 (aged 30)
Lucy Kennedy (AUS)	July 11, 1988 (aged 30)
Alexandra Manly (AUS)	February 28, 1996 (aged 22)

Rider	Date of birth
Sarah Roy (AUS)	February 27, 1986 (aged 32)
Amanda Spratt (AUS)	September 17, 1987 (aged 31)
Moniek Tenniglo (NED)	May 2, 1988 (aged 30)
Annemiek van Vleuten (NED)	October 8, 1982 (aged 36)
Georgia Williams (NZL)	August 25, 1993 (aged 25)

== 2018 ==
Ages as of 1 January 2018.

Rider	Date of birth
Jessica Allen (AUS)	April 17, 1993 (aged 24)
Jenelle Crooks (AUS)	July 2, 1994 (aged 23)
Jolien D'Hoore (BEL)	March 14, 1990 (aged 27)
Gracie Elvin (AUS)	October 31, 1988 (aged 29)
Lucy Kennedy (AUS)	July 11, 1988 (aged 29)

Rider	Date of birth
Alexandra Manly (AUS)	February 28, 1996 (aged 21)
Sarah Roy (AUS)	February 27, 1986 (aged 31)
Amanda Spratt (AUS)	September 17, 1987 (aged 30)
Annemiek van Vleuten (NED)	October 8, 1982 (aged 35)
Georgia Williams (NZL)	August 25, 1993 (aged 24)

== 2017 ==
Ages as of 1 January 2017.

Rider	Date of birth
Jessica Allen (AUS)	April 17, 1993 (aged 23)
Georgia Baker (AUS)	September 21, 1994 (aged 22)
Jenelle Crooks (AUS)	July 2, 1994 (aged 22)
Gracie Elvin (AUS)	October 31, 1988 (aged 28)
Katrin Garfoot (AUS)	October 8, 1981 (aged 35)
Alexandra Manly (AUS)	February 28, 1996 (aged 20)

Rider	Date of birth
Rachel Neylan (AUS)	March 9, 1982 (aged 34)
Sarah Roy (AUS)	February 27, 1986 (aged 30)
Amanda Spratt (AUS)	September 17, 1987 (aged 29)
Annemiek van Vleuten (NED)	October 8, 1982 (aged 34)
Georgia Williams (NZL)	August 25, 1993 (aged 23)

== 2016 ==
Ages as of 1 January 2016.

Rider	Date of birth
Jessica Allen (AUS)	17 April 1993 (aged 22)
Jenelle Crooks (AUS)	2 July 1994 (aged 21)
Gracie Elvin (AUS)	31 October 1988 (aged 27)
Katrin Garfoot (AUS)	8 October 1981 (aged 34)
Alexandra Manly (AUS)	28 February 1996 (aged 19)
Chloe McConville (AUS)	1 October 1987 (aged 28)
Rachel Neylan (AUS)	9 March 1982 (aged 33)

Rider	Date of birth
Loren Rowney (AUS)	14 October 1988 (aged 27)
Sarah Roy (AUS)	27 February 1986 (aged 29)
Amanda Spratt (AUS)	17 September 1987 (aged 28)
Macey Stewart (AUS)	16 January 1996 (aged 19)
Annemiek van Vleuten (NED)	8 October 1982 (aged 33)
Tayler Wiles (USA)	20 July 1989 (aged 26)
Elizabeth Williams (AUS)	15 August 1983 (aged 32)

== 2015 ==
Ages as of 1 January 2015.

Rider	Date of birth
Gracie Elvin (AUS)	October 31, 1988 (aged 26)
Katrin Garfoot (AUS)	October 8, 1981 (aged 33)
Loes Gunnewijk (NED)	November 27, 1980 (aged 34)
Melissa Hoskins (AUS)	February 24, 1991 (aged 23)
Emma Johansson (SWE)	September 23, 1983 (aged 31)
Alexandra Manly (AUS)	February 28, 1996 (aged 18)
Chloe McConville (AUS)	October 1, 1987 (aged 27)

Rider	Date of birth
Rachel Neylan (AUS)	March 9, 1982 (aged 32)
Sarah Roy (AUS)	February 27, 1986 (aged 28)
Valentina Scandolara (ITA)	May 1, 1990 (aged 24)
Amanda Spratt (AUS)	September 17, 1987 (aged 27)
Macey Stewart (AUS)	January 16, 1996 (aged 18)
Elizabeth Williams (AUS)	August 15, 1983 (aged 31)

== 2014 ==
Ages as of 1 January 2014.

Rider	Date of birth
Annette Edmondson (AUS)	December 12, 1991 (aged 22)
Gracie Elvin (AUS)	October 31, 1988 (aged 25)
Katrin Garfoot (from 17/6)* (AUS)	October 8, 1981 (aged 32)
Shara Gillow (AUS)	December 23, 1987 (aged 26)
Loes Gunnewijk (NED)	November 27, 1980 (aged 33)
Melissa Hoskins (AUS)	February 24, 1991 (aged 22)

Rider	Date of birth
Emma Johansson (SWE)	September 23, 1983 (aged 30)
Jessie MacLean (AUS)	October 17, 1985 (aged 28)
Valentina Scandolara (ITA)	May 1, 1990 (aged 23)
Amanda Spratt (AUS)	September 17, 1987 (aged 26)
Grace Sulzberger (AUS)	December 18, 1988 (aged 25)
Carlee Taylor (AUS)	February 15, 1989 (aged 24)

*On June 17, the team announced the signing of Katrin Garfoot for the remainder of the 2014 season.

== 2013 ==
As of 1 January 2013.

Rider	Date of birth
Tiffany Cromwell (AUS)	July 6, 1988 (aged 24)
Annette Edmondson (AUS)	December 12, 1991 (aged 21)
Gracie Elvin (AUS)	October 31, 1988 (aged 24)
Shara Gillow (AUS)	December 23, 1987 (aged 25)
Loes Gunnewijk (NED)	November 27, 1980 (aged 32)

Rider	Date of birth
Melissa Hoskins (AUS)	February 24, 1991 (aged 21)
Emma Johansson (SWE)	September 23, 1983 (aged 29)
Jessie MacLean (AUS)	October 17, 1985 (aged 27)
Amanda Spratt (AUS)	September 17, 1987 (aged 25)
Gu Sung-eun (KOR)	August 19, 1984 (aged 28)

== 2012 ==
Ages as of 1 January 2012.

Rider	Date of birth
Judith Arndt (GER)	July 23, 1976 (aged 35)
Tiffany Cromwell (AUS)	July 6, 1988 (aged 23)
Rowena Fry (AUS)	December 8, 1982 (aged 29)
Shara Gillow (AUS)	December 23, 1987 (aged 24)
Loes Gunnewijk (NED)	November 27, 1980 (aged 31)
Melissa Hoskins (AUS)	February 24, 1991 (aged 20)

Rider	Date of birth
Claudia Lichtenberg (GER)	November 17, 1985 (aged 26)
Jessie MacLean (AUS)	October 17, 1985 (aged 26)
Alexis Rhodes (AUS)	December 1, 1984 (aged 27)
Amanda Spratt (AUS)	September 17, 1987 (aged 24)
Linda Villumsen (NZL)	April 9, 1985 (aged 26)
