= Ryan Mullen =

Irish cyclist (born 1994)

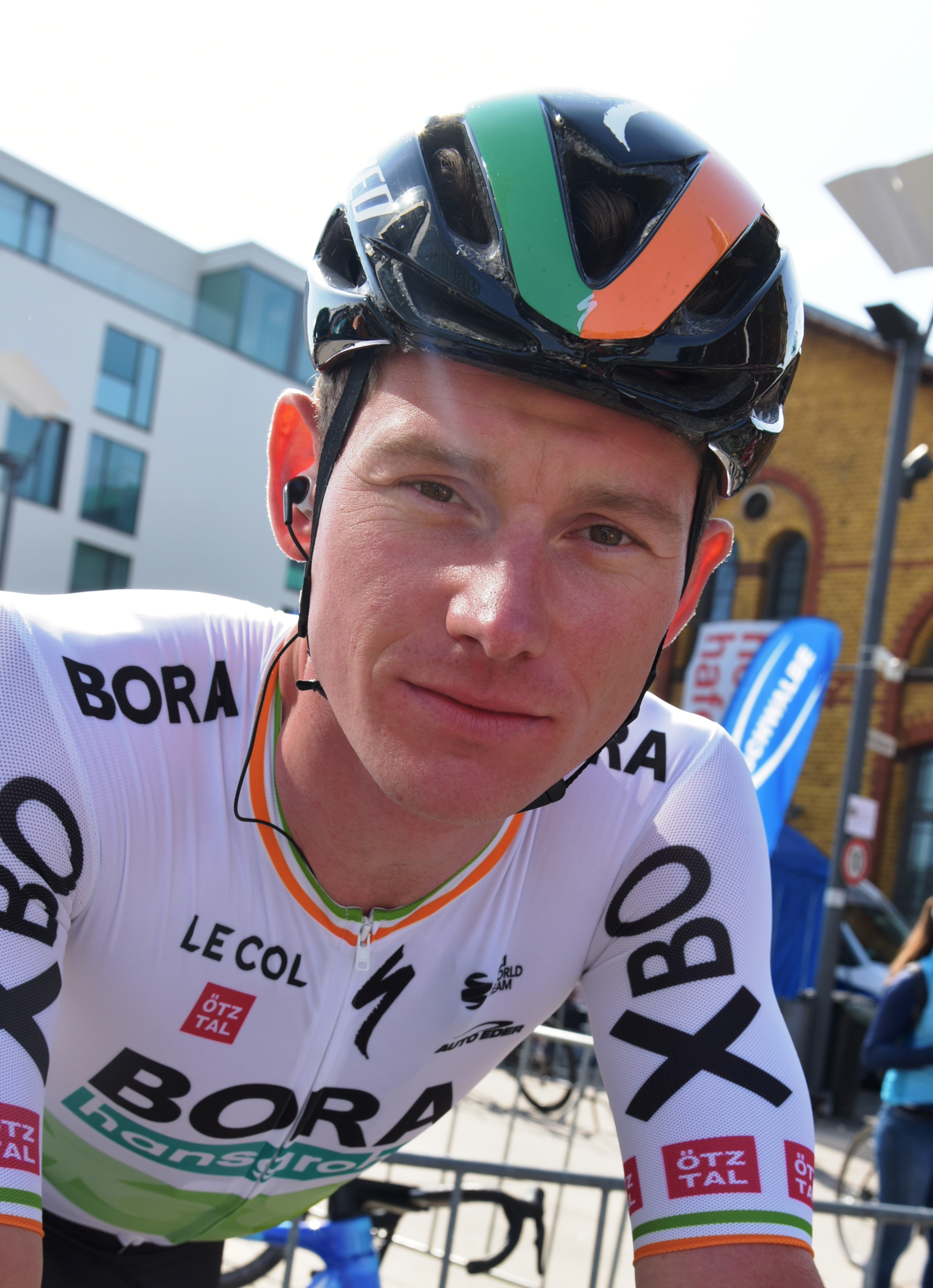
- Mullen in 2022

Personal information
- Full name: Ryan William Mullen
- Born: 7 August 1994 (age 32) Birkenhead, England
- Height: 1.88 m (6 ft 2 in)
- Weight: 81 kg (179 lb)

Cycling career
- Sport: Cycling
- Current team: NSN Cycling Team
- Disciplines: Road; Track
- Role: Rider
- Rider type: Time trialist

Amateur teams
- 2008–2010: Rhos on Sea CC
- 2011–2012: Planet X

Professional teams
- 2013: Team IG–Sigma Sport
- 2014–2015: An Post–Chain Reaction
- → 2015: Cannondale–Garmin (stagiaire)
- 2016–2017: Cannondale
- 2018–2021: Trek–Segafredo
- 2022–2025: Bora–Hansgrohe
- 2026-: NSN Cycling Team

Major wins
- One-day races and Classics National Road Race Championships (2014, 2017, 2021) National Time Trial Championships (2015, 2017, 2018, 2019, 2021, 2023, 2025)
Medal record
Representing Ireland
Men's road bicycle racing
World Championships
Silver medal – second place	2014 Ponferranda	Men's under-23 time trial
European Championships
Bronze medal – third place	2017 Herning	Time trial

Ryan William Mullen (born 7 August 1994) is an Irish professional road racing cyclist who currently rides for UCI WorldTeam NSN Cycling Team. Born in England and representing Ireland, he is a seven-time Irish National Time Trial Champion and three-time Irish National Road Race Champion.

== Career ==
Born in Birkenhead, England, Mullen attended Ysgol Eirias in Colwyn Bay, Wales. While he was attending Ysgol Eirias, Mullen was a member of Rhos on Sea Cycling Club, the same club as Netcompany–Ineos general manager and former head of British Cycling Dave Brailsford. Mullen turned professional with Team IG–Sigma Sport in 2013 before joining An Post–Chain Reaction for the 2014 season. In February 2014, Mullen finished 4th in the Elite Men's Individual Pursuit at the UCI track world championships in Cali, Colombia. At the 2014 Irish National championships in Multyfarnham, Westmeath, Mullen became the youngest ever Irish Elite Road Race champion. On the same weekend he also won the U23 Individual Time Trial and Road Race titles.

He took the silver in the under-23 time trial at the 2014 UCI Road World Championships in Ponferrada, finishing half a second behind winner Campbell Flakemore of Australia. He rode at the 2015 UCI Track Cycling World Championships, where he came seventh in the individual pursuit. Mullen won the Irish national time trial championship in 2015, becoming the youngest ever rider to take the title. In August 2015, it was announced that he had signed to ride in the UCI World Tour for Cannondale from 2016. Mullen rode with Cannondale–Garmin as a stagiaire in the 2015 Tour of Britain, then competed in under-23 time trial at the 2015 world championships. He was at a disadvantage because he did his ride in wet conditions and finished eleventh, 49 seconds behind the winner, Mads Würtz Schmidt.

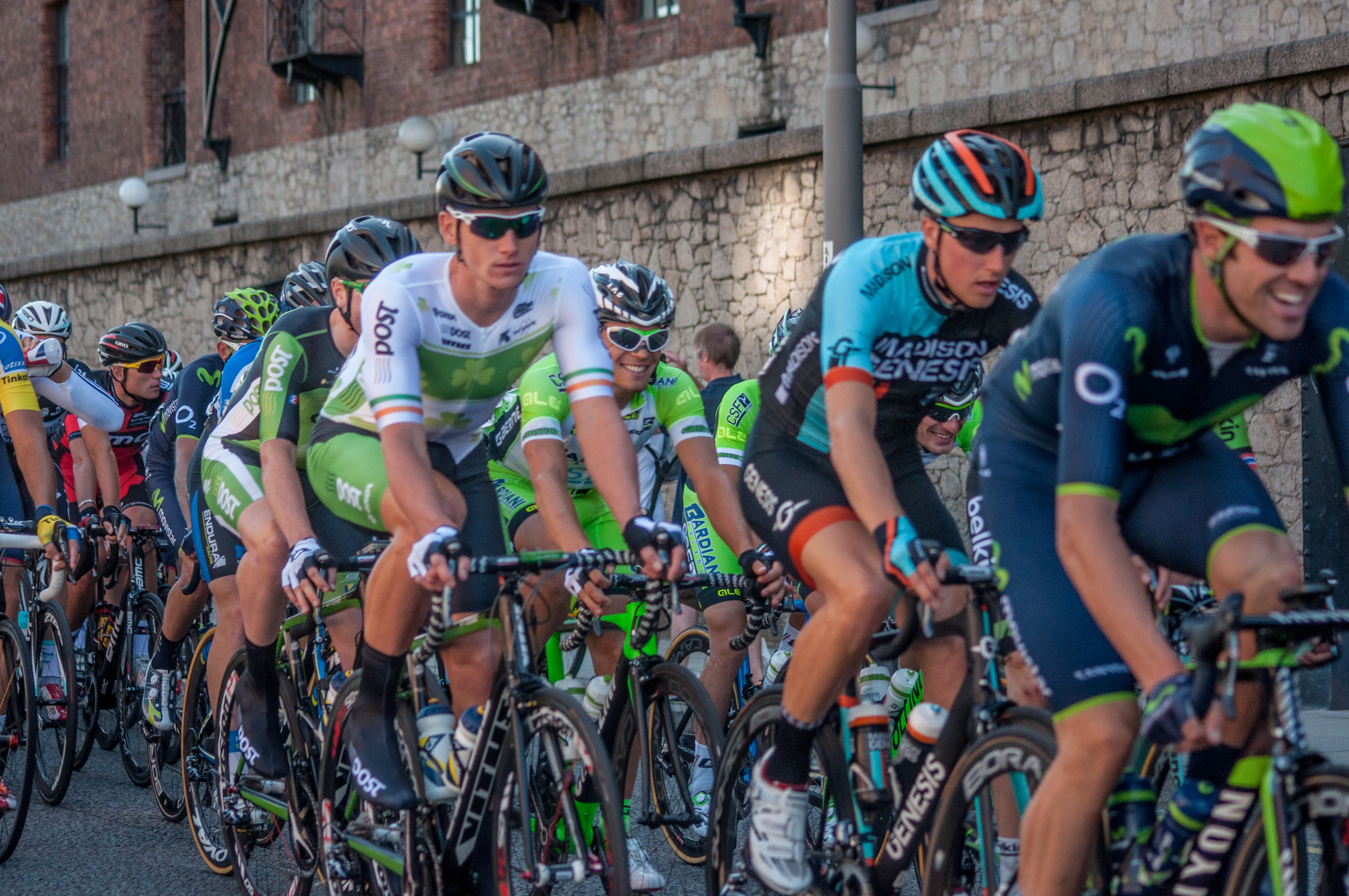
Mullen wearing the Irish national champion's jersey at the 2014 Tour of Britain

=== Trek–Segafredo (2018–2021) ===
In September 2017 it was confirmed that he would join Trek–Segafredo for the 2018 season. Mullen's first race for the team was the Vuelta a San Juan, he went on to win the Time-Trial on stage 3. In an interview with Cyclingnews.com Mullen confirmed he was likely to make his Grand Tour debut at the Giro d'Italia, where he was targeting the Time-Trial on stage 1 in Jerusalem. He did make his Grand Tour début in the race, finishing 138th overall.

=== Bora–Hansgrohe ===
After four seasons with Trek–Segafredo, Mullen moved to the Bora–Hansgrohe team for the 2022 season along with his compatriot Sam Bennett, who had moved from Deceuninck–Quick-Step.

== Major results ==
2010
3rd Time trial, British National Junior Road Championships
2011
Irish National Junior Road Championships

1st Time trial
1st Road race

2012
1st Time trial, National Junior Road Championships
1st Chrono des Nations Juniors
2nd Time trial, UEC European Junior Road Championships
6th Overall Niedersachsen Rundfahrt Juniors
9th Time trial, UCI Junior Road World Championships
2013
1st Time trial, National Under-23 Road Championships
1st Chrono des Nations U23
UEC European Under-23 Track Championships

3rd Individual pursuit
3rd Scratch

7th Time trial, UCI Under-23 Road World Championships
2014
National Road Championships

1st Road race
1st Under-23 road race
1st Under-23 time trial

2nd Time trial, UCI Under-23 Road World Championships
6th ZLM Tour
2015
National Road Championships

1st Time trial
1st Under-23 time trial

3rd Overall An Post Rás

1st Young rider classification

4th Time trial, UEC European Under-23 Road Championships
8th Time trial, European Games
2016
1st Stage 1 (TTT) Czech Cycling Tour
National Road Championships

2nd Under-23 time trial
3rd Time trial
9th Road race

4th Chrono des Nations
5th Time trial, UCI Road World Championships
2017
National Road Championships

1st Road race
1st Time trial

3rd Time trial, UEC European Road Championships
8th Chrono des Nations
10th Overall Tour of Britain
2018
1st Time trial, National Road Championships
1st Stage 3 (ITT) Vuelta a San Juan
6th Time trial, UEC European Road Championships
2019
National Road Championships

1st Time trial
3rd Road race

4th Time trial, European Games
2020
8th Time trial, UEC European Road Championships
2021
National Road Championships

1st Road race
1st Time trial

2022
10th Scheldeprijs
10th Rund um Köln
2023
National Road Championships

1st Time trial
4th Road race

2024
2nd Time trial, National Road Championships
2025
1st Time trial, National Road Championships

=== Grand Tour general classification results timeline ===
Grand Tour	2018	2019	2020	2021	2022	2023	2024
Giro d'Italia	138	—	—	—	—	—	131
Tour de France	—	—	—	—	—	—	
Vuelta a España	—	—	—	—	128	—	

Legend
—	Did not compete
DNF	Did not finish
