= Brady Gilmore =

Australian cyclist (born 2001)

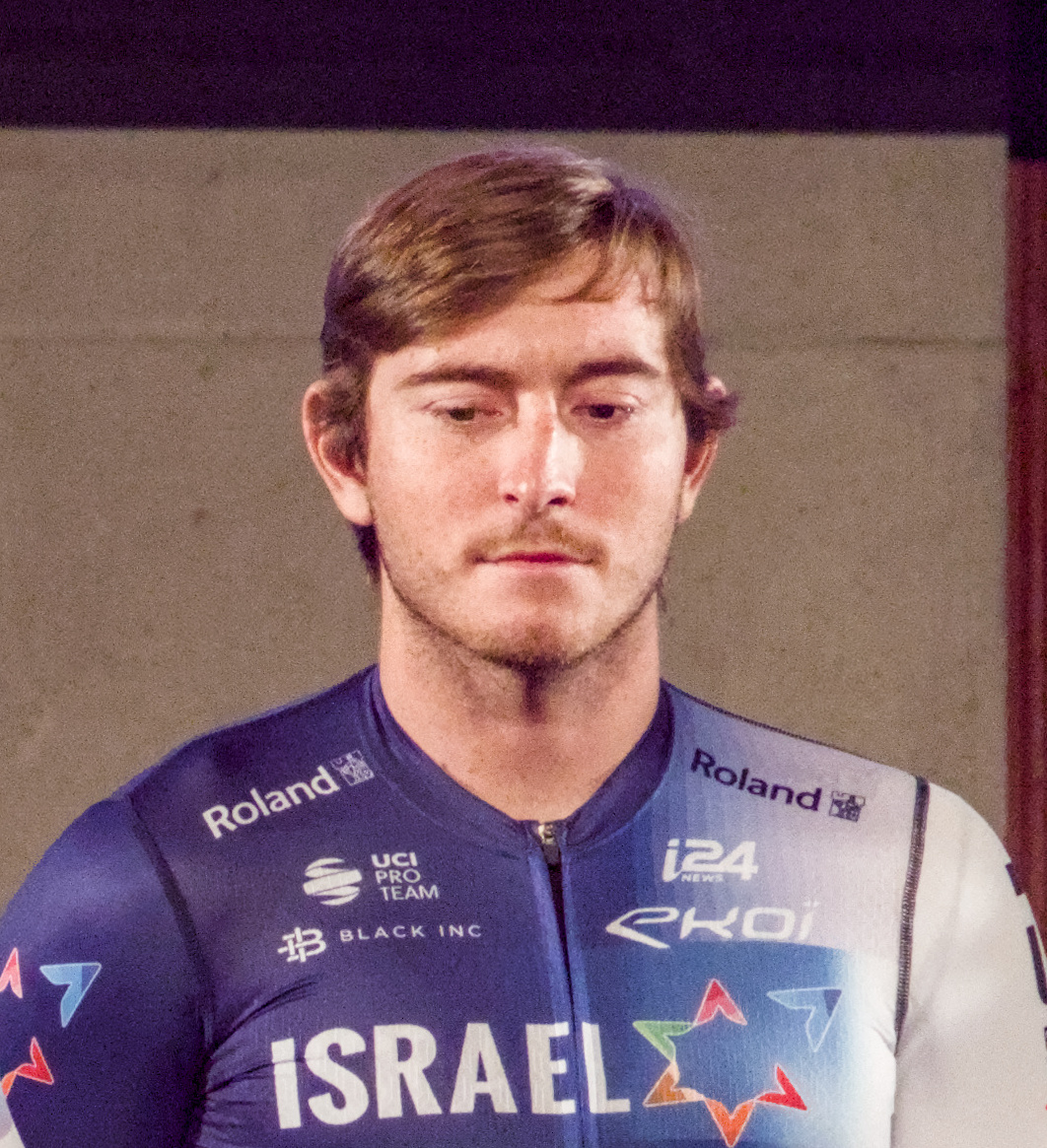
- Gilmore in 2023

Personal information
- Born: 14 April 2001 (age 25) Kalgoorlie, Australia
- Height: 1.72 m (5 ft 8 in)
- Weight: 70 kg (154 lb)

Cycling career
- Sport: Cycling
- Current team: NSN Cycling Team
- Discipline: Road
- Role: Rider

Amateur teams
- 2021: Veris Racing
- 2022: Cycling Development Foundation

Professional teams
- 2022–2024: ARA Pro Racing Sunshine Coast
- 2023: Israel–Premier Tech (stagiaire)
- 2024–2025: Israel Premier Tech Academy
- 2026–: NSN Cycling Team

Brady Gilmore (born 14 April 2001) is an Australian cyclist, who currently rides for UCI WorldTeam NSN Cycling Team. He took his first professional wins in 2025, winning two stages of the Tour du Rwanda.

== Career ==
Born 14 April 2001 in Kalgoorlie, Gilmore currently rides for WorldTour squad NSN Cycling Team. After transitioning from motocross, he began his competitive road racing career on the Western Australian domestic circuit within the Cycling Development Foundation development pipeline before advancing to the Continental and WorldTour ranks. Following his formative seasons in the state-level program, he transitioned to the domestic Continental tier mid-way through 2022 by signing with ARA Skip Capital (then ARA Pro Racing Sunshine Coast), which served as his final stepping stone to his international contract.

== Major results ==
2022
2nd Road race, Oceania Road Championships
4th Time trial, Oceania Under-23 Road Championships
7th Overall Spirit of Tasmania Cycle Tour
2023
1st Time trial, Oceania Under-23 Road Championships
2nd Road race, Oceania Road Championships
1st Tour de Brisbane
National Under-23 Road Championships

2nd Road race
4th Time trial

2024
2nd GP Dr. Eugeen Roggeman
4th Japan Cup Criterium
5th Grand Prix Cerami
2025 (4 pro wins)
1st Overall Tour de Taiwan

1st Stage 2

1st Overall Circuit des Ardennes

1st Points classification
1st Stage 4

4th Road race, National Road Championships
10th Overall Tour du Rwanda

1st Stages 2 & 3

2026 (1)
1st Stage 7 Volta a Catalunya
3rd Cadel Evans Great Ocean Road Race
9th Brabantse Pijl
