= ProVelo Super League =

Cycling competition in Australia

- Sport: Cycling
- Founded: 2025
- Website: provelosuperleague.com

The ProVelo Super League is a series of bicycle races which has been held in Australia from January to March each year since 2025, when it replaced the National Road Series.

== Overview ==
The PSL was designed as a pathway to the UCI World Tour and UCI Women's World Tour. It was founded by retired cyclist Matt Wilson and Aaron Flanagan with businessman Gerry Ryan as managing director. The three men are majority shareholders in the league.

The series is supported by national governing body AusCycling. Races are broadcast on SBS with car rental company Hertz as the title sponsor. In 2026 the league launched a crowd-funding campaign to raise $1.5 million.

== Events ==
Rounds are held across Australia and include individual time trials, criteriums and road races, such as:

- SA Kick It (South Australia)
- Tour of Tasmania (Tasmania)
- Melbourne to Warrnambool (Victoria)
- Harbour City GP (New South Wales)
- Grafton to Inverell (New South Wales)
- Q Tour (Queensland)

== Teams ==
Wildcard entries are allowed for individuals and teams, as are international riders. Teams have included:

=== Men's ===
- ARA Skip Capital
- Butterfields Ziptrak Racing
- Carz Direct Falcons Pedal Mafia
- CCache x Bodywrap
- Cobra9 x Leigh Surveyors
- Cycling Development Foundation
- McCarthy Homes–QCF
- Pinnacle Performance x Royal Bikes
- RCA BikesOnline
- Team Brennan
- VIS p/b K.O.M.P

=== Women's ===
- ARA Skip Capital
- Cycling Development Foundation
- Butterfields Ziptrak Racing
- Meridian Bikebug
- Nstromo x Attaquer x CCache
- Team Redcat

== See also ==
- Australian National Road Cycling Championships
- Australian National Road Race Championships
- Tour Down Under
- UCI Continental Circuits
