= Cycling Development Foundation =

Australian cycling development organisation

- Abbreviation: CDF
- Founded: 2016
- Type: Not-for-profit incorporated association
- Headquarters: Perth, Western Australia, Australia
- Website: cyclingdevelopment.org.au

The Cycling Development Foundation (CDF) is an Australian not-for-profit cycling organisation based in Perth, Western Australia. Established in 2016, it runs road cycling development programs nationally and community cycling programs in Perth and remote WA.

CDF has fielded men's and women's teams in the National Road Series and the ProVelo Super League. Its racing program previously competed as Veris Racing.

CDF also runs the Laverton Cycling Project, a youth cycling and bicycle maintenance program in Western Australia's Goldfields region.

== Laverton Cycling Project ==
CDF established the Laverton Cycling Project in July 2018 with Laverton School and the Laverton Leonora Cross Cultural Association.

The project began in Laverton, Western Australia, where participants rebuilt second-hand bicycles and took part in cycling and exercise activities. The program has also included bicycle maintenance, riding instruction, road safety, health and wellbeing education and youth mentoring.

By 2024, the program was being delivered in Laverton for one week each month and had expanded to Cosmo Newbery and Mulga Queen. In 2026, the program began implementing wider community health programs across Laverton and the surrounding regions.

=== Fundraising ride ===
CDF has organised fundraising rides for the Laverton Cycling Project.

== Racing program ==
CDF has fielded men's and women's teams in Australian national-level road racing, with its riders competing in the National Road Series and, from 2025, the ProVelo Super League.

Brady Gilmore won the under-23 men's road race title at the 2022 Oceania Road Championships while riding for CDF.

The team had several prominent results during the 2023 National Road Series. Brendon Green finished second in the Melbourne to Warrnambool Classic, behind Tristan Saunders. Boris Clark recorded four second-place finishes during the series and won the third stage of the Tour of Tasmania. Mackenzie Coupland won the Tour of Tasmania overall after a solo victory on the Poatina stage, while Lucie Fityus won two stages at Cycle Sunshine Coast.

CDF entered the inaugural ProVelo Super League in 2025. Craig Wiggins finished third on the opening men's stage of the Harbour City Grand Prix.

Several riders have progressed from CDF to professional and international teams. Mackenzie Coupland moved from CDF to the Liv AlUla Jayco development structure after the 2023 season. Brady Gilmore progressed through ARA Skip Capital to the UCI World Tour in 2026 with NSN Cycling Team. Lucie Fityus rode with CDF for four years before moving to ARA Skip Capital, turning professional with St Michel-Preference Home-Auber93 in 2025 and signing with Team Picnic PostNL in the Women's WorldTour for 2026.
