= 2014 UCI Road World Championships – Men's under-23 time trial =

Men's under-23 time trial
2014 UCI Road World Championships
- Time trial Rainbow jersey

Race details
- Dates: 22 September 2014
- Stages: 1
- Distance: 36.15 km (22.46 mi)
- Winning time: 43' 49.94"

Medalists
	Gold	Campbell Flakemore (AUS)
	Silver	Ryan Mullen (IRL)
	Bronze	Stefan Küng (SUI)

The Men's under-23 time trial of the 2014 UCI Road World Championships took place in and around Ponferrada, Spain on 22 September 2014. The course of the race was 36.15 km (22.46 mi) with the start and finish in Ponferrada.

The world title was won by Australia's Campbell Flakemore – who finished fourth in the event in 2013 – and in the process, became the fourth Australian rider in the last six years to win the title. Flakemore completed the course just 0.48 seconds quicker than the silver medallist Ryan Mullen of the Republic of Ireland, while the bronze medal was taken by Swiss rider Stefan Küng, 9.22 seconds behind Flakemore.

== Qualification ==
All National Federations were allowed to enter four riders for the race, with a maximum of two riders to start. In addition to this number, the outgoing World Champion and the current continental champions were also able to take part.

Champion	Name
Outgoing World Champion	Damien Howson (AUS)
African Champion	Willem Smit (RSA)
Pan American Champion	Rodrigo Contreras (COL)
Asian Champion	Viktor Okishev (KAZ)
European Champion	Stefan Küng (SUI)
Oceanian Champion	Harry Carpenter (AUS)

== Schedule ==
All times are in Central European Time (UTC+1).

Date	Time	Event
22 September 2014	14:00–16:35	Men's under-23 time trial
22 September 2014	16:55	Victory ceremony

== Participating nations ==
63 cyclists from 40 nations took part in the men's under-23 time trial. The number of cyclists per nation is shown in parentheses.

- Algeria (2)
- Argentina (2)
- Australia (1)
- Austria (2)
- Azerbaijan (1)
- Belgium (2)
- Chile (1)
- Colombia (2)
- Croatia (1)
- Denmark (2)
- France (2)
- (United Kingdom) Great Britain (2)
- Germany (2)
- Greece (1)
- Honduras (1)
- (Republic of Ireland) Ireland (1)
- Italy (2)
- Kazakhstan (3)
- Luxembourg (1)
- Morocco (2)
- Moldova (1)
- Mexico (1)
- Netherlands (1)
- Norway (1)
- New Zealand (2)
- Poland (1)
- Portugal (1)
- Qatar (1)
- Romania (1)
- Russia (2)
- Rwanda (2)
- Singapore (1)
- Slovenia (1)
- South Africa (2)
- Spain (2) (host)
- Sweden (2)
- Switzerland (3)
- Turkey (2)
- Ukraine (1)
- United States (2)

== Prize money ==
The UCI assigned premiums for the top 3 finishers with a total prize money of €5,367.

Position	1st	2nd	3rd	Total
Amount	€3,067	€1,533	€767	€5,367

== Final classification ==
Rank	Rider	Time
1	(Australia) Campbell Flakemore (AUS)	43' 49.94"
2	(Republic of Ireland) Ryan Mullen (IRL)	+ 0.48"
3	(Switzerland) Stefan Küng (SUI)	+ 9.22"
4	(Portugal) Rafael Reis (POR)	+ 19.32"
5	(Germany) Maximilian Schachmann (DEU)	+ 37.84"
6	(United Kingdom) Jon Dibben (GBR)	+ 38.28"
7	(Norway) Andreas Vangstad (NOR)	+ 44.88"
8	(South Africa) Louis Meintjes (RSA)	+ 48.36"
9	(Belgium) Frederik Frison (BEL)	+ 1' 07.22"
10	(New Zealand) James Oram (NZL)	+ 1' 09.57"
11	(Austria) Lukas Pöstlberger (AUT)	+ 1' 25.43"
12	(Germany) Nils Politt (DEU)	+ 1' 27.68"
13	(Russia) Viktor Manakov (RUS)	+ 1' 28.62"
14	(Netherlands) Steven Lammertink (NED)	+ 1' 38.56"
15	(Switzerland) Théry Schir (SUI)	+ 1' 44.31"
16	(Denmark) Søren Kragh Andersen (DEN)	+ 1' 44.42"
17	(Luxembourg) Alex Kirsch (LUX)	+ 1' 45.57"
18	(Spain) Juan Camacho (ESP)	+ 1' 46.03"
19	(Italy) Davide Martinelli (ITA)	+ 1' 55.32"
20	(Russia) Alexander Evtushenko (RUS)	+ 1' 55.33"
21	(Spain) Mario González (ESP)	+ 1' 55.74"
22	(Sweden) Marcus Fåglum (SWE)	+ 1' 57.38"
23	(United States) Robin Carpenter (USA)	+ 1' 57.53"
24	(United Kingdom) Scott Davies (GBR)	+ 2' 01.65"
25	(Mexico) Ignacio Prado (MEX)	+ 2' 02.28"
26	(New Zealand) Dion Smith (NZL)	+ 2' 05.42"
27	(Chile) José Luis Rodríguez (CHI)	+ 2' 06.43"
28	(South Africa) Willem Smit (RSA)	+ 2' 09.83"
29	(Kazakhstan) Oleg Zemlyakov (KAZ)	+ 2' 10.22"
30	(Kazakhstan) Viktor Okishev (KAZ)	+ 2' 17.72"
31	(Belgium) Ruben Pols (BEL)	+ 2' 23.19"
32	(Switzerland) Tom Bohli (SUI)	+ 2' 24.75"
33	(Ukraine) Marlen Zmorka (UKR)	+ 2' 27.91"
34	(Austria) Gregor Mühlberger (AUT)	+ 2' 36.66"
35	(United States) Taylor Eisenhart (USA)	+ 2' 37.39"
36	(Colombia) Miguel Ángel López (COL)	+ 2' 37.49"
37	(Poland) Przemysław Kasperkiewicz (POL)	+ 2' 37.62"
38	(Greece) Ioannis Spanopoulos (GRE)	+ 2' 40.64"
39	(Colombia) Carlos Ramírez (COL)	+ 2' 56.88"
40	(France) Rémi Cavagna (FRA)	+ 2' 58.82"
41	(Italy) Seid Lizde (ITA)	+ 3' 08.64"
42	(Argentina) Facundo Lezica (ARG)	+ 3' 12.95"
43	(Denmark) Casper von Folsach (DEN)	+ 3' 22.33"
44	(Croatia) Bruno Maltar (CRO)	+ 3' 31.11"
45	(Slovenia) David Per (SLO)	+ 3' 33.48"
46	(France) Bruno Armirail (FRA)	+ 3' 54.61"
47	(Argentina) Hugo Ángel Velázquez (ARG)	+ 4' 03.42"
48	(Morocco) Anasse Ait El Abdia (MAR)	+ 4' 06.57"
49	(Turkey) Ahmet Örken (TUR)	+ 4' 10.13"
50	(Algeria) Abderrahmane Mansouri (ALG)	+ 4' 34.30"
51	(Rwanda) Valens Ndayisenga (RWA)	+ 4' 38.33"
52	(Kazakhstan) Dmitriy Rive (KAZ)	+ 4' 43.94"
53	(Morocco) Salah Eddine Mraouni (MAR)	+ 4' 47.71"
54	(Sweden) Pontus Kastemyr (SWE)	+ 4' 48.16"
55	(Azerbaijan) Tural Isgandarov (AZE)	+ 4' 59.52"
56	(Algeria) Adil Barbari (ALG)	+ 5' 01.17"
57	(Rwanda) Jean Bosco Nsengimana (RWA)	+ 5' 04.25"
58	(Turkey) Feritcan Şamlı (TUR)	+ 5' 14.91"
59	(Honduras) Pablo Cruz (HON)	+ 6' 01.42"
60	(Romania) Szabolcs Sebestyén (ROU)	+ 6' 29.81"
61	(Singapore) Benedict Lee (SIN)	+ 7' 21.47"
62	(Qatar) Diego Hossfeldt (QAT)	+ 7' 41.77"
63	(Moldova) Victor Cartin (MDA)	+ 9' 56.68"
