= National Road Series =

Cycling competition in Australia

The National Road Series (NRS) was a series of bicycle races held each year in Australia as the chief domestic road racing competition. It ended in 2024, making way for the ProVelo Super League.

== Overview ==
The series was organised by Cycling Australia. It included one-day races, multi-stage tours, and criteriums. Races were broadcast on SBS. After Subaru became the naming rights sponsor in 2012, the series was also known as the Subaru National Road Series. The series produced many major UCI World Tour riders including Caleb Ewan, Grace Brown and Patrick Bevin.

== Events ==
Events included:

- Adelaide Tour
- Amy’s Otway Classic, Amy's Otway Tour
- Battle on the Border
- Battle Recharge (Queensland)
- Giro della Donna (Victoria)
- Goulburn to Sydney
- Grafton to Inverell (New South Wales)
- Melbourne to Warrnambool Classic, the world's second oldest one-day race.
- Mersey Valley Tour
- National Capital Tour
- North Western Tour
- NRS on Zwift, during the COVID-19 pandemic
- Shipwreck Coast
- St Kilda Super Criterium
- Stan Siejka Classic (Tasmania)
- Summer Criterium Series
- Tour de Brisbane
- Tour de Perth
- Tour de Tweed
- Tour of Gippsland (Victoria)
- Tour of King Valley (Victoria)
- Tour of Tasmania
- Tour of Toowoomba
- Tour of the Great South Coast (Victoria)
- Tour of the Murray River
- Tour of the Tropics
- Trek Night Riders
- White Bay Criterium

== Teams ==
As of 24 May 2020.

=== Men's ===
- ARA Pro Racing Sunshine Coast (UCI Continental)
- Avantias Pro Racing
- Butterfields – Insurance Advisernet p/b Van D’am Racing
- GPM Stulz
- InForm TM Insight MAKE
- Nero Continental (UCI Continental)
- Oliver's Real Food Racing (UCI Continental)
- Phoenix Cycling Collective
- Rauland Development Cycling Team
- South Australia Sports Institute
- St George Continental Cycling Team (UCI Continental)
- Subaru-Giant Racing Team
- Team BridgeLane (UCI Continental)
- Team CCS Canberra Men’s
- TRS Racing Team
- Velofit Australia
- Veris Racing Men’s Team

=== Women's ===
- ARA Pro Racing Sunshine Coast
- Knights x LMLY Racing
- Roxsolt Attaquer
- South Australia Sports Institute
- Specialized Women’s Racing
- StepFWD Suzuki
- Sydney Uni-Staminade
- Team CCS Canberra Women’s
- Veris Racing Women’s Team
