= Mackenzie Coupland =

Australian cyclist (born 2005)

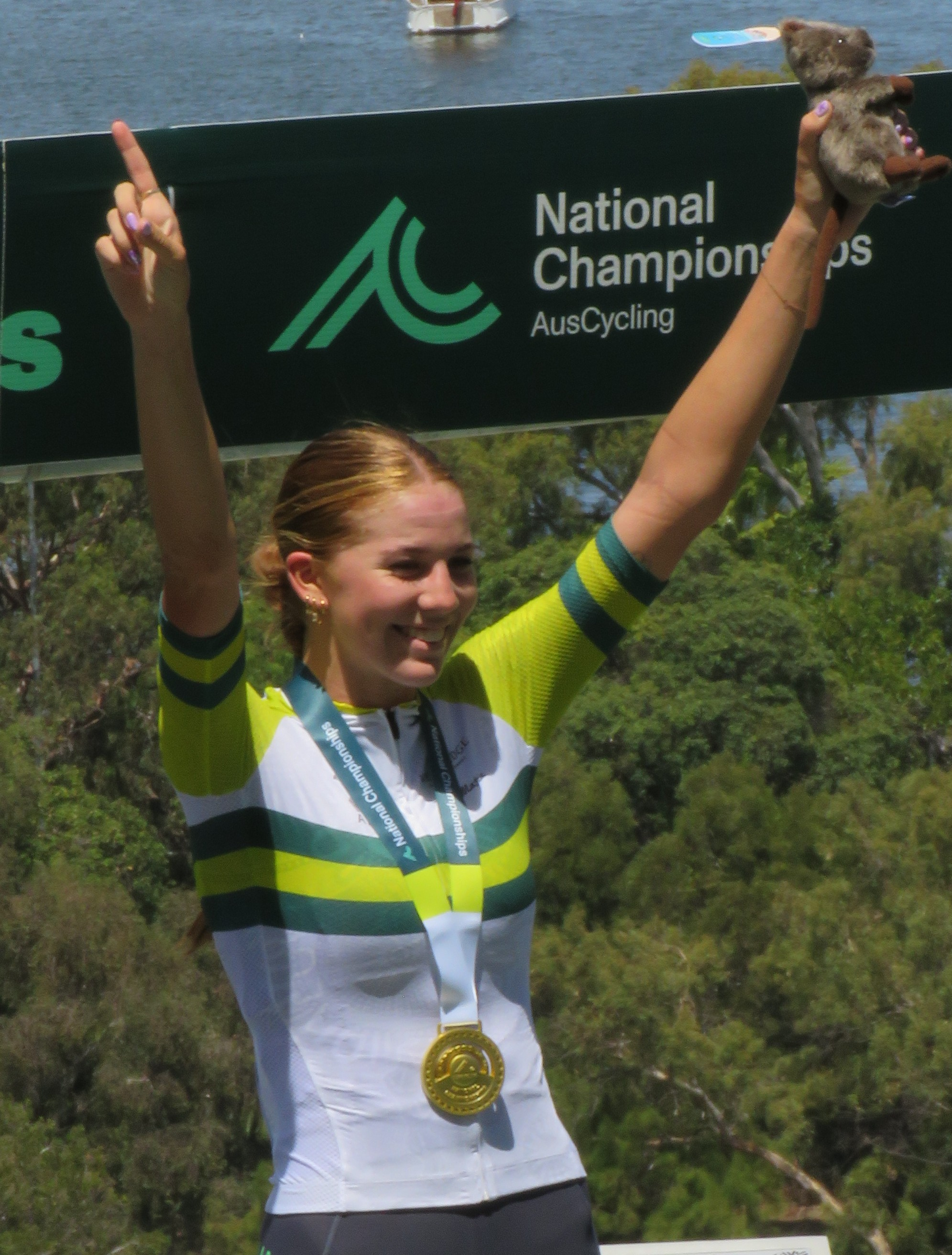
- Coupland after winning the Australian National Road Race Championships in 2026

Personal information
- Born: 1 September 2005 (age 21) Kalamunda, Western Australia

Cycling career
- Sport: Cycling
- Current team: Liv AlUla Jayco
- Discipline: Road

Amateur team
- 2022–2023: Cycling Development Foundation

Professional teams
- 2024–2025: Liv AlUla Jayco Women's Continental Team
- 2026: Liv AlUla Jayco

Major wins
- One-day races and Classics National Road Race Championships (2026)

Mackenzie Coupland (born 1 September 2005) is an Australian professional road cyclist who rides for Liv AlUla Jayco. She won the 2026 Australian National Road Race Championship.

== Career ==
Coupland competed on the Australian domestic circuit as a junior, progressing through the ranks of the Perth-based Cycling Development Foundation program. In 2024, she joined the Liv AlUla Jayco Continental development team, where her initial European results included finishing 14th overall at the 2025 Tour de Pologne Women and 7th overall at the 2025 Premondiale Giro Toscana.

After two years on Liv AlUla Jayco's development squad, the UCI Women's World Tour team announced they were signing Coupland to a two-year contract in August 2025. In just her third race as a professional, Coupland won the 2026 Australian National Road Race Championship in a 10 kilometres (6.2 mi) solo effort. As the elite and under-23 championship are run as a combined race, and Coupland was just 20 years old, she also became the Australian under-23 champion.

Coupland won her first pro stage race at the Vuelta a Extremadura Femenina, winning a sprint against Lauren Dickson to win the final stage and the overall race.

== Major results ==
2023
2nd Time trial, Oceania Junior Championships
2nd Road race, National Junior Championships
UCI Junior World Championships

5th Time trial
9th Road race

2026
1st National Road Race Championship
1st Overall Vuelta a Extremadura Femenina

1st Points classification
1st Youth classification
1st Stage 3
