= Cyrus Monk =

Australian bicycle racer

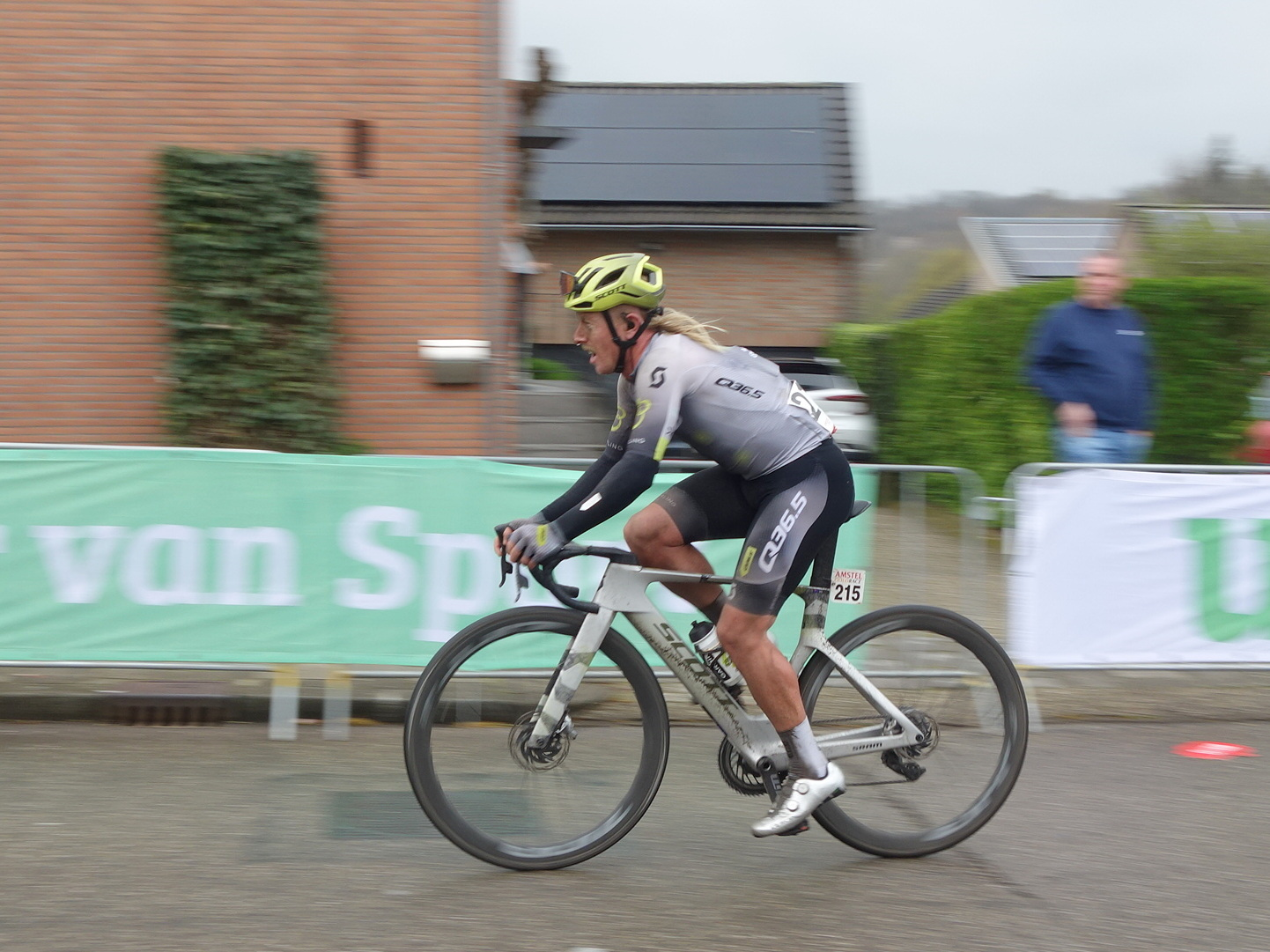
- Monk in 2023

Personal information
- Born: 7 November 1996 (age 29) Warragul, Victoria, Australia
- Height: 1.75 m (5 ft 9 in)
- Weight: 67 kg (148 lb)

Cycling career
- Sport: Cycling
- Current team: FNIX–SCOM–Hengxiang Cycling Team
- Discipline: Road
- Role: Rider

Amateur teams
- 2015: African Wildlife Safaris Cycling Team
- 2016: Pat's Veg

Professional teams
- 2017: Cannondale–Drapac (stagiaire)
- 2017–2018: Drapac–Pat's Veg
- 2018: EF Education First–Drapac p/b Cannondale (stagiaire)
- 2019–2021: EvoPro Racing
- 2022: Meiyo CCN Pro Cycling
- 2023–2024: Q36.5 Pro Cycling Team
- 2025–: FNIX–SCOM–Hengxiang Cycling Team

Cyrus Monk (born 7 November 1996) is an Australian cyclist, who last rode for UCI Continental team FNIX–SCOM–Hengxiang Cycling Team.

== Personal life ==
Born in Warragul, Monk majored in physiology (Bachelor of Science) at the University of Melbourne.

== Major results ==
2015
2nd Grafton to Inverell Classic
2016
World University Cycling Championship

1st Road race
3rd Criterium

Oceania Cycling Championships

3rd Under-23 road race
7th Road race

2017
Oceania Cycling Championships

3rd Under-23 time trial
5th Road race

9th Grote Prijs Jean-Pierre Monseré
2018
1st Road race, National Under-23 Road Championships
Oceania Cycling Championships

2nd Under-23 road race
3rd Road race

10th Ronde van Vlaanderen Beloften
2019
3rd Gravel and Tar
2021
4th Overall Belgrade Banjaluka
2022
3rd Overall Tour of Sharjah

1st Stage 1 (ITT)
