= Jenelle Crooks =

Australian bicycle racer

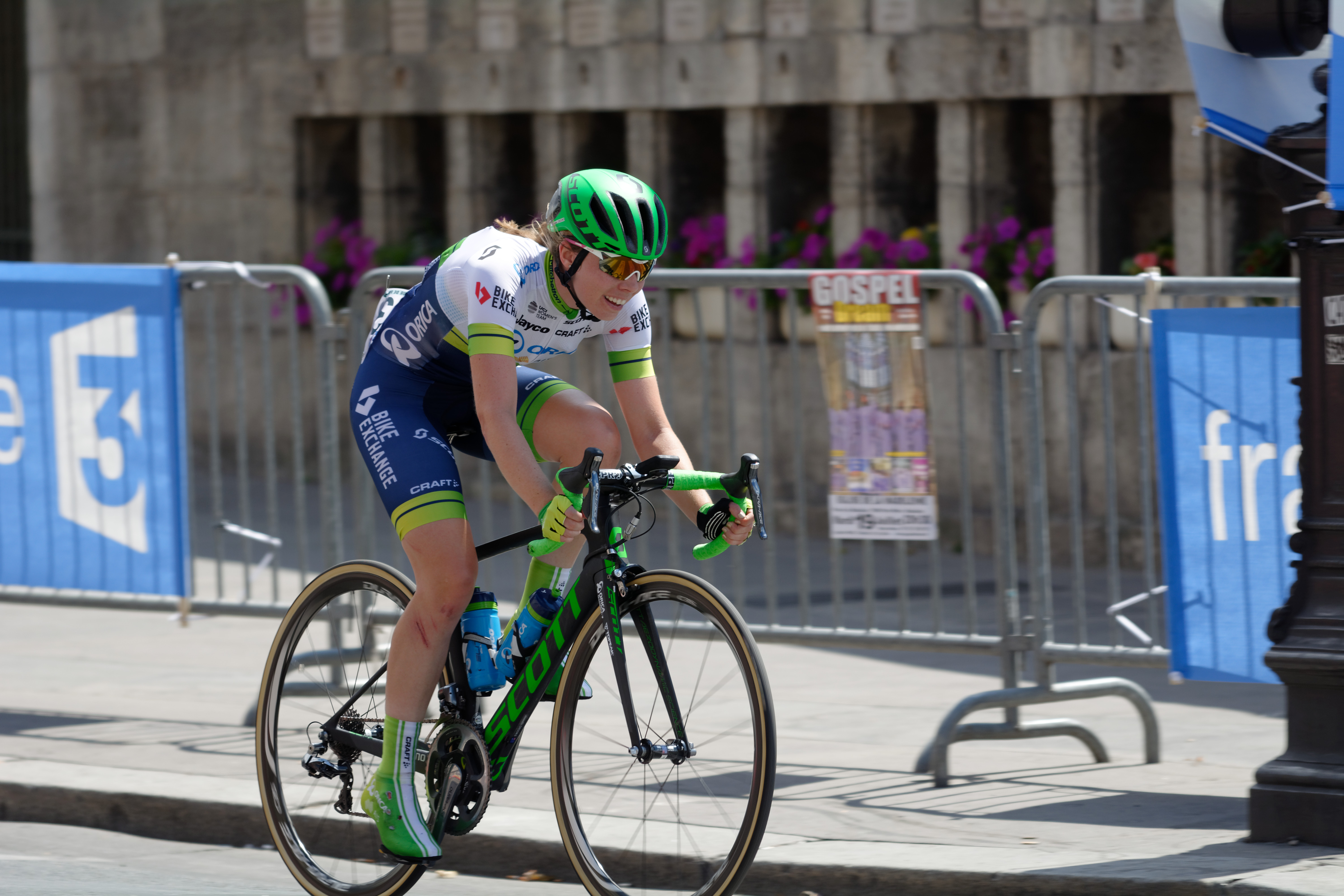
- Crooks in the 2016 La Course by Le Tour de France

Personal information
- Full name: Jenelle Crooks
- Nickname: Nelle
- Born: 2 July 1994 (age 32) Perth, Western Australia

Cycling career
- Sport: Cycling
- Current team: Retired
- Discipline: Road
- Role: Rider
- Rider type: Climber

Amateur teams
- 2013: Pensar SPM Racing
- 2014: Holden Women's Cycling
- 2014–2016: National Development Team
- 2015–2016: Specialized Women's Racing

Professional teams
- 2016–2018: Orica–AIS
- 2020: Tibco–Silicon Valley Bank

Jenelle Crooks (born 2 July 1994) is an Australian former professional racing cyclist, who rode professionally between 2016 and 2020 for the Mitchelton–Scott and Tibco–Silicon Valley Bank teams. Crooks has also competed for Australian National Road Series team Specialized Women's Racing and with the Australian National Team for their tour of European races.

== Major results ==
2013
3rd Criterium, National Under-23 Road Championships
10th Road race, Oceania Road Championships
2014
National Under-23 Road Championships

1st Time trial
2nd Road race

2015
1st Young rider classification Thüringen Rundfahrt der Frauen
Oceania Road Championships

3rd Under-23 road race
9th Road race

3rd Time trial, National Under-23 Road Championships
7th Overall Women's Tour Down Under
7th Overall La Route de France

1st Young rider classification

2016
National Under-23 Road Championships

1st Road race
3rd Time trial
