= 1997 UCI Road World Championships – Men's time trial =

Men's Time Trial
1997 UCI Road World Championships
- Rainbow jersey

Race details
- Dates: 9 October
- Stages: 1
- Distance: 43.5 km (27.03 mi)
- Winning time: 52' 01.19"

The men's time trial at the 1997 UCI Road World Championships was held on Thursday October 9, 1997, in San Sebastián, Spain, over 43.8 km.

== Final classification ==
	Cyclist	Nation		Time
1st place, gold medalist(s)	Laurent Jalabert	France	in	52 min 01 s 19
2nd place, silver medalist(s)	Serhiy Honchar	Ukraine	+	3 s 32
3rd place, bronze medalist(s)	Chris Boardman	United Kingdom	+	20 s 53
4.	Tony Rominger	Switzerland	+	24 s 34
5.	Uwe Peschel	Germany	+	44 s 89
6.	Melcior Mauri	Spain	+	46 s 29
7.	Erik Breukink	Netherlands	+	1 min 27 s 11
8.	Jonathan Hall	Australia	+	1 min 45 s 84
9.	Zenon Jaskuła	Poland	+	2 min 04 s 88
10.	Juan Carlos Domínguez	Spain	+	2 min 14 s 31
11.	Alex Zülle	Switzerland	+	2 min 15 s 37
12.	Michael Andersson	Sweden	+	2 min 18 s 08
13.	Dario Andriotto	Italy	+	2 min 20 s 34
14.	Roland Meier	Switzerland	+	2 min 23 s 82
15.	Jonathan Vaughters	United States	+	2 min 46 s 63
16.	Henk Vogels	Australia	+	3 min 21 s 72
17.	Lauri Aus	Estonia	+	3 min 33 s 98
18.	Cristian Salvato	Italy	+	3 min 35 s 81
19.	Eddy Seigneur	France	+	3 min 36 s 40
20.	David Millar	United Kingdom	+	3 min 50 s 31
21.	Vladimir Poulnikov	Ukraine	+	3 min 50 s 89
22.	Evgueni Berzin	Russia	+	3 min 59 s 85
23.	Servais Knaven	Netherlands	+	4 min 03 s 10
24.	Jan Karlsson	Sweden	+	4 min 31 s 12
25.	Remigius Lupeikis	Lithuania	+	4 min 37 s 04
26.	Dainis Ozols	Latvia	+	4 min 39 s 88
27.	Ruslan Ivanov	Moldova	+	4 min 42 s 56
28.	Joaquim Adrego Andrade	Portugal	+	4 min 44 s 82
29.	Eric Wohlberg	Canada	+	4 min 58 s 89
30.	Jan Hruška	Czech Republic	+	5 min 00 s 94
31.	Piotr Chmielewski	Poland	+	5 min 01 s 90
32.	Andreas Walzer	Germany	+	5 min 07 s 93
33.	Víctor Hugo Peña	Colombia	+	5 min 13 s 45
34.	Marc Streel	Belgium	+	5 min 13 s 45
35.	Saša Sviben	Slovenia	+	5 min 44 s 29
36.	Michael Sandstød	Denmark	+	6 min 01 s 25
37.	Dietmar Müller	Austria	+	6 min 15 s 18
38.	Robert Pintarič	Slovenia	+	6 min 42 s 56
39.	Tyler Hamilton	United States	+	6 min 48 s 68
40.	Bernhard Gugganig	Austria	+	6 min 51 s 64
41.	Igor Bonciucov	Moldova	+	7 min 07 s 44
42.	Miroslav Lipták	Slovakia	+	7 min 10 s 83
43.	Milan Dvorščík	Slovakia	+	7 min 59 s 00
44.	Hernandez Quadri	Brazil	+	8 min 12 s 56
45.	Jorge Giacinti	Argentina	+	8 min 43 s 10
46.	Benjamin Loberant	Israel	+	9 min 27 s 84
47.	Dragomir Zivkovic	Yugoslavia	+	13 min 07 s 88
