= Jonathan Hall (cyclist) =

Australian cyclist

Personal information
- Full name: Jonathan Hall
- Born: 8 October 1972 (age 54) Wollongong, Australia

Cycling career
- Sport: Cycling
- Current team: Retired
- Discipline: Road
- Role: Rider

Professional team
- 1998–2000: Festina–Lotus

Jonathan Hall (born 8 October 1972) is an Australian former racing cyclist. He won the Australian national road race title in 1997.

== Major results ==
1995
1st Time trial, Oceania Road Championships
1997
National Road Championships

1st Road race
1st Time trial

1st Stages 5, 11 & 14 Commonwealth Bank Classic
2nd Time trial, Oceania Road Championships
8th Time trial, UCI Road World Championships
1998
2nd Clásica Memorial Txuma
2nd Subida a Gorla
9th Overall Vuelta a La Rioja
1999
1st Time trial, Oceania Road Championships
1st Time trial, National Road Championships
3rd Overall Commonwealth Bank Classic
5th GP d'Europe
