= Jessica Allen (cyclist) =

Australian cyclist

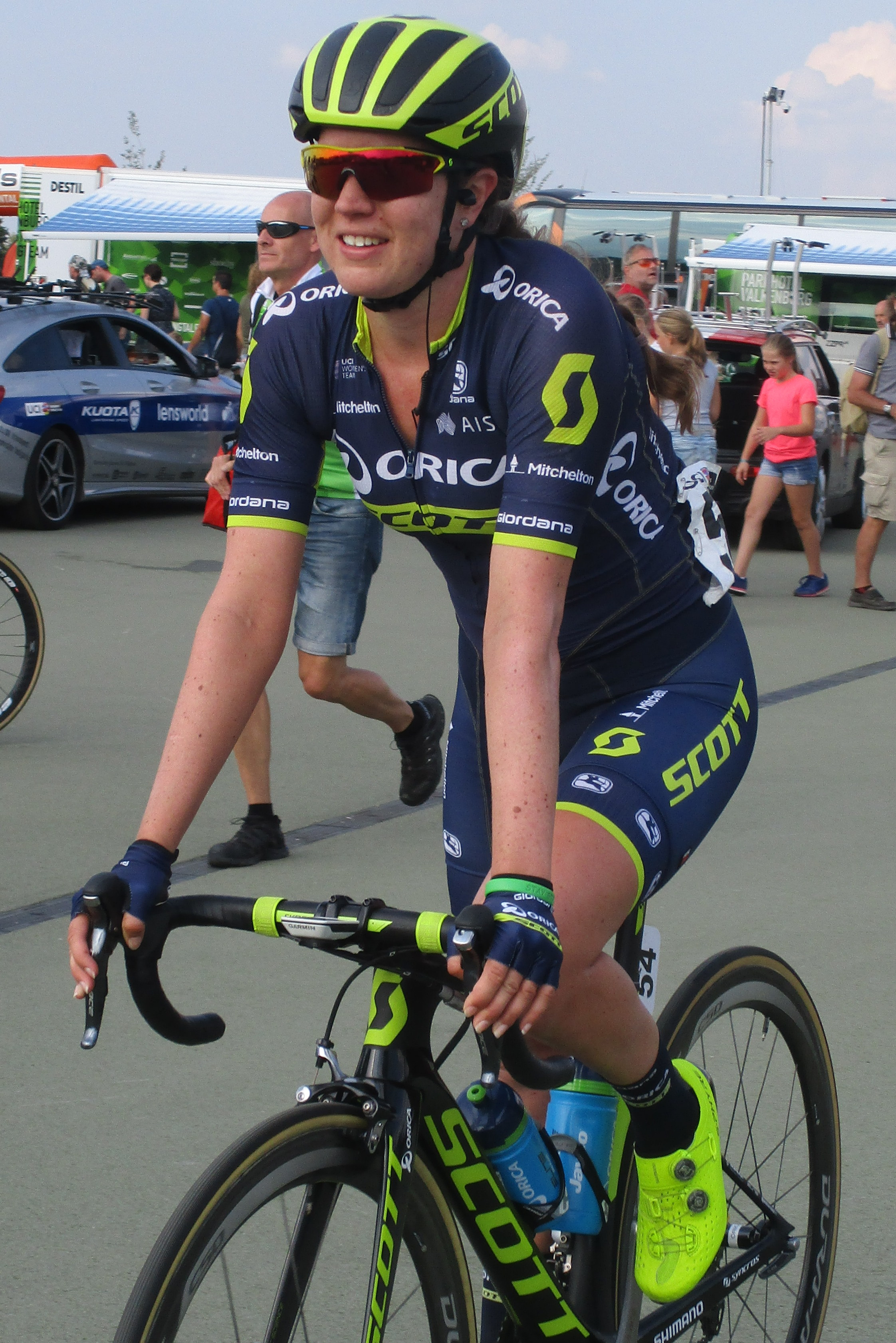
- Jessica Allen at sign on for the 2022 Tour of Scandinavia

Personal information
- Full name: Jessica Allen
- Nickname: Jess
- Born: 17 April 1993 (age 33) Perth, Western Australia

Cycling career
- Sport: Cycling
- Discipline: Road
- Role: Rider

Amateur teams
- 2015: Wormall Civil CCS
- 2016: National Cycling Centre of Hamilton
- 2016: High5 Dream Team

Professional teams
- 2013: Vienne Futuroscope
- 2016–2023: Orica–AIS

Jessica Allen (born 17 April 1993) is an Australian former professional racing cyclist, who rode for UCI Women's WorldTeam Liv AlUla Jayco for seven and a half years.

== Major results ==
2010
3rd Time trial, National Junior Road Championships
2011
1st Time trial, UCI Junior Road World Championships
1st Time trial, Oceania Junior Road Championships
2012
1st Young rider classification Women's Tour of New Zealand
2013
3rd Time trial, National Under-23 Road Championships
2014
1st Road race, Oceania Road Championships
2015
8th Road race, Oceania Under-23 Road Championships
2017
1st Criterium, National Road Championships
2018
2nd Team time trial, Ladies Tour of Norway
