= Oceania Road Cycling Championships =

Continental cycling championships held in Oceania

Oceania Road Championships
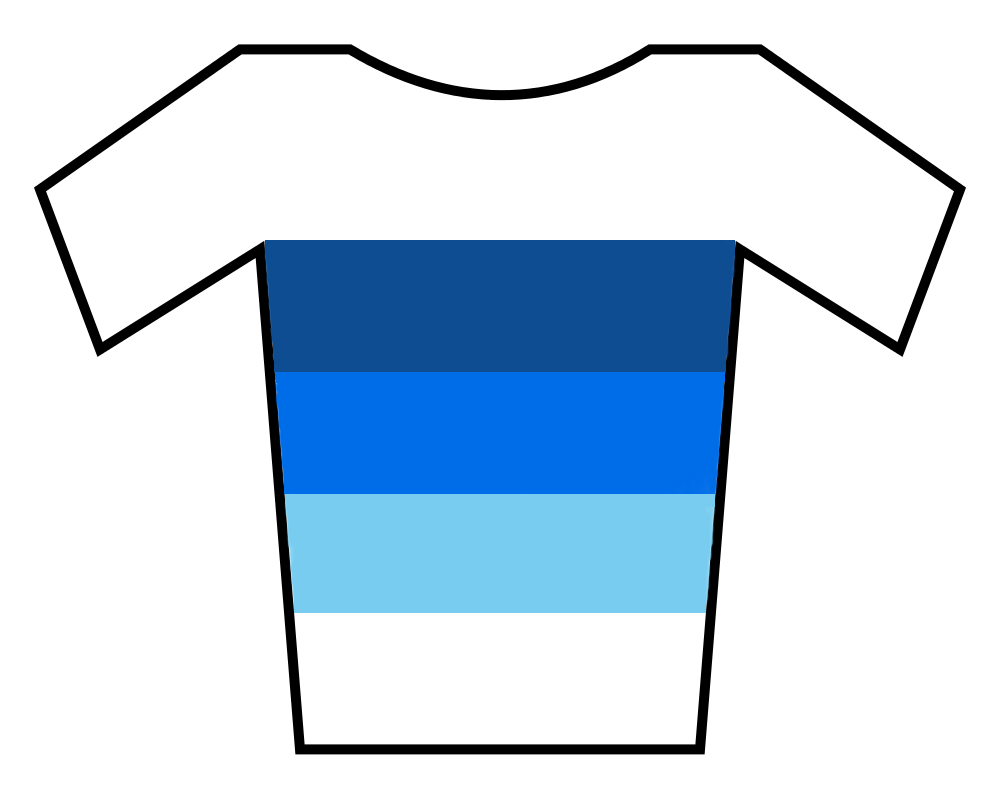
- The champion's jersey

Race details
- Region: Oceania
- Discipline: Road
- Competition: UCI Oceania Tour

History
- First edition: 1995

The Oceania Road Championships are a series of road cycling races held annually to determine the Oceanian champion in each event. The event has been held since 1995 and consists of an elite and under-23 men's and an elite women's road race and time trial.

The Oceania Cycling Confederation hosts the events to provide an opportunity for athletes to gain UCI points, and to help selection for national team representation at world championships.

== Competitions ==
Number	Year	Country	Location	Road race	Time trial
1	1995	Australia	Townsville		
2	1997	New Zealand	Wanganui		
3	1999	Australia	Sydney		
4	2005	New Zealand	Wanganui		
5	2007 (1)	Australia	Murwillumbah		
6	2007 (2)	New Zealand	Invercargill		
7	2009 (1)	Australia	Geelong		
8	2009 (2)	New Zealand	Invercargill		
9	2011	Australia	Shepparton (Dookie)		
10	2012	New Zealand	Queenstown		
11	2013	Australia	Canberra		
12	2014	Australia	Toowoomba		
13	2015	Australia	Toowoomba	road race at Goombungee	time trial at Helidon
14	2016	Australia	Bendigo		
15	2017	Australia	Canberra		
16	2018	Australia	Tasmania	road race at Railton	time trial at Evandale
17	2019	Australia	Tasmania	road race at Railton	time trial at Evandale
N/A	2020–2021	Cancelled			
18	2022	Australia	Queensland		
19	2023	Australia	Queensland		
20	2024	Australia	Queensland		
N/A	2025	Cancelled			
21	2026	Australia	Queensland		

== Men's events ==
=== Road race ===
The road race championship races for elite and U23 riders were combined, except for 2009(1).

Year	Winner	2nd	3rd
1995	(New Zealand) Ric Reid	Marc Rousseau	(Australia) Duncan Smith
1997	(New Zealand) Glen Mitchell	(New Zealand) Karl Murray	(New Zealand) Brendon Vesty
1999	Jean-Charles Goyetche	(New Zealand) Robin Reid	(Australia) Baden Burke
2005	(New Zealand) Gordon McCauley	(Australia) Phillip Thuaux	(New Zealand) Geoffrey Burndred
2007 (1)	(Australia) Robert McLachlan	(Australia) David Pell	(New Zealand) Ashley Whitehead
2007 (2)	(New Zealand) Hayden Roulston	(New Zealand) Joe Chapman	(New Zealand) Paul Odlin
2009 (1)	(Australia) Tommy Nankervis	(Australia) Daniel Braunsteins	(Australia) Nick Walker
2009 (2)	(Australia) Michael Matthews	(New Zealand) Matt Marshall	(New Zealand) Alex McGregor
2011	(Australia) Ryan Obst	(Australia) Sam Rutherford	(Australia) Steele Von Hoff
2012	(New Zealand) Paul Odlin	(Australia) Nick Aitken	(Australia) Mark O'Brien
2013	(Australia) Cameron Meyer	(Australia) Damien Howson	(Australia) Jack Anderson
2014	(Australia) Luke Durbridge	(Australia) Robert Power	(Australia) Bernard Sulzberger
2015	(New Zealand) Taylor Gunman	(Australia) Jordan Kerby	(New Zealand) Daniel Barry
2016	(Australia) Sean Lake	(Australia) Brendan Canty	(Australia) Mark O'Brien
2017	(Australia) Lucas Hamilton	(Australia) Michael Storer	(Australia) Jai Hindley
2018	(Australia) Chris Harper	(Australia) James Whelan	(Australia) Cyrus Monk
2019	(Australia) Benjamin Dyball	(New Zealand) Jason Christie	(Australia) Chris Harper
2022	(New Zealand) James Fouché	(New Zealand) Tom Sexton	(Australia) Zack Gilmore
2023	(Australia) Liam Walsh	(Australia) Brady Gilmore	(New Zealand) Tom Sexton
2024	(Australia) Ryan Cavanagh	(Australia) Matthew Greenwood	(New Zealand) Aaron Gate
2026	(Australia) Carter Bettles	(New Zealand) Luke Mudgway	(Australia) Alastair Christie-Johnston

=== Time trial ===
The ITT championship races for elite and U23 riders were combined, except for 2009, 2011, 2013, 2014 and 2017, when U23 riders raced on a shorter course than the elite riders. In 2007(1) (Hayden Josefski), 2009(2) (Michael Matthews), and 2012 (Damien Howson) the U23 champions clocked better times than the elite champions. However, U23 riders were not eligible for the elite title at this time, a rule which later has been discarded by the UCI.

Year	Winner	2nd	3rd
1995	(Australia) Jonathan Hall	(Australia) Nathan O'Neill	(New Zealand) Gary Anderson
1997	(New Zealand) Lee Vertongen	(New Zealand) Stuart Mitchell	(Australia) Jonathan Hall
1999	(Australia) Jonathan Hall	Jean-Marc Riviere	(Australia) Peter Milostic
2005	(New Zealand) Gordon McCauley, 1st overall	(New Zealand) Robin Reid, 3rd	(New Zealand) Aaron Strong, 6th
2007 (1)	(Australia) Cameron Wurf, 2nd	(Australia) David Pell, 3rd	(Australia) Robert McLachlan, 5th
2007 (2)	(New Zealand) Gordon McCauley, 1st	(New Zealand) Joseph Cooper, 2nd	(New Zealand) Reon Park, 3rd
2009 (1)	(Australia) Chris Jongewaard	(Australia) David Pell	(Australia) Chris Martin
2009 (2)	(Australia) Drew Ginn, 3rd	(New Zealand) Logan Hutchings, 4th	(New Zealand) Simon Croom, 6th
2011	(Australia) William Dickeson	(Australia) David Pell	(Australia) Nick Bensley
2012	(New Zealand) Sam Horgan, 2nd	(New Zealand) Paul Odlin, 3rd	(Australia) Michael Cupitt, 4th
2013	(New Zealand) Paul Odlin	(Australia) Benjamin Dyball	(New Zealand) Joseph Cooper
2014	(New Zealand) Joseph Cooper	(Australia) William Clarke	(Australia) Lachlan Norris
2015	(Australia) Michael Hepburn, 1st	(Australia) Craig Evers, 3rd	(Australia) Cameron Wurf, 4th
2016	(Australia) Sean Lake, 1st	(New Zealand) Joseph Cooper, 2nd	(Australia) Benjamin Dyball, 3rd
2017	(Australia) Sean Lake	(Australia) Benjamin Dyball	(New Zealand) Hamish Bond
2018	(New Zealand) Hamish Bond, 1st	(Australia) Sean Lake, 3rd	(Australia) James Ogilvie, 6th
2019	(Australia) Benjamin Dyball, 1st	(New Zealand) Jason Christie, 2nd	(Australia) Michael Freiberg, 4th
2022	(New Zealand) Aaron Gate	(New Zealand) Tom Sexton	(Australia) Michael Freiberg
2023	(New Zealand) Tom Sexton	(Australia) Jordan Villani	(Australia) Riley Fleming
2024	(New Zealand) Aaron Gate	(Australia) Oliver Stenning	(Australia) Ben Dyball
2026	(Australia) Conor Leahy	(Australia) Oliver Bleddyn	(Australia) Alastair Christie-Johnston

== Women ==
=== Road race ===
Year	Winner	2nd	3rd
1995	(Australia) Cathy Reardon	(Australia) Charlotte White-Pordham	(Australia) Kirsten Richards
2002	(Australia) Claire Baxter	(New Zealand) Robyn Wong	(New Zealand) Nicole Swain
2003	(Australia) Leonie Aisbett	(New Zealand) Elisabeth Williams	(Australia) Lorian Graham
2005	(New Zealand) Sarah Ulmer	(New Zealand) Susie Wood	(New Zealand) Toni Bradshaw
2007 (1)	(Australia) Kathryn Watt	(Australia) Carla Ryan	(Australia) Peta Mullens
2007 (2)	(Australia) Rochelle Gilmore	(New Zealand) Joanne Kiesanowski	(New Zealand) Emma Crum
2009 (1)	(Australia) Alexis Rhodes	(Australia) Ruth Corset	(Australia) Rochelle Gilmore
2009 (2)	(Australia) Bridie O'Donnell	(New Zealand) Karen Fulton	(Australia) Rochelle Gilmore
2011	(Australia) Shara Gillow	(Australia) Bridie O'Donnell	(Australia) Chloe McConville
2012	(Australia) Gracie Elvin	(Australia) Shara Gillow	(Australia) Rachel Neylan
2013	(Germany) Katrin Garfoot	(Australia) Amy Bradley* Oceania Champion	(Australia) Carla Ryan
2014	(Australia) Jessica Allen	(Australia) Lisa Keeling	(Australia) Shara Gillow
2015	(Australia) Lauren Kitchen	(Australia) Lizzie Williams	(Australia) Katrin Garfoot
2016	(Australia) Shannon Malseed	(Australia) Jessica Mundy	(Australia) Lisen Hockings
2017	(Australia) Lisen Hockings	(Australia) Shannon Malseed	(Australia) Lucy Kennedy
2018	(New Zealand) Sharlotte Lucas	(Australia) Grace Brown	(New Zealand) Mikayla Harvey
2019	(New Zealand) Sharlotte Lucas	(Australia) Sarah Gigante	(Australia) Jemma Eastwood
2022	(Australia) Josie Talbot	(Australia) Danielle De Francesco	(Australia) Amber Pate
2023	(Australia) Sophie Edwards	(Australia) Matilda Raynolds	(Australia) Ruth Corset
2024	(Australia) Katelyn Nicholson	(Australia) Keely Bennett	(Australia) Haylee Fuller
2026	(Australia) Tully Schweitzer	(Australia) Sophia Sammons	(Australia) Katelyn Nicholson

=== Time trial ===
Year	Winner	2nd	3rd
1995	(Australia) Karen Barrow	(Australia) Cathy Reardon	(New Zealand) Joanna Lawn
2003	(Australia) Amy Safe-Gillett	(Australia) Natalie Bates	(Australia) Kathryn Watt
2005	(New Zealand) Sarah Ulmer	(Australia) Kathryn Watt	(New Zealand) Alison Shanks
2007 (1)	(Australia) Vicky Whitelaw-Eustace	(Australia) Kathryn Watt	(Australia) Carla Ryan
2007 (2)	(Australia) Bridie O'Donnell	(New Zealand) Dale Tye	(New Zealand) Rachel Mercer
2009 (1)	(Australia) Bridie O'Donnell	(Australia) Alexis Rhodes	(Australia) Vicky Whitelaw-Eustace
2009 (2)	(Australia) Alexis Rhodes	(New Zealand) Melissa Holt	(Australia) Bridie O'Donnell
2011	(Australia) Shara Gillow	(Australia) Bridie O'Donnell	(Australia) Alexis Rhodes
2012	(Australia) Shara Gillow	(Australia) Gracie Elvin	(Australia) Bridie O'Donnell
2013	(Australia) Taryn Heather	(Australia) Grace Sulzberger	(Australia) Ruth Corset
2014	(Australia) Shara Gillow	(Australia) Felicity Wardlaw	(New Zealand) Reta Trotman
2015	(Australia) Katrin Garfoot	(Australia) Lauren Kitchen	(Australia) Rebecca Mackey
2016	(Australia) Katrin Garfoot	(Australia) Bridie O'Donnell	(Australia) Kate Perry
2017	(Australia) Lucy Kennedy	(Australia) Rebecca Mackey	(Australia) Lisen Hockings
2018	(New Zealand) Grace Brown	(Australia) Kate Perry	(New Zealand) Sharlotte Lucas
2019	(Australia) Kate Perry	(Australia) Nicole Frain	(Australia) Jennifer Pettenon
2022	(Australia) Georgie Howe	(Australia) Amber Pate	(Australia) Anna Davis
2023	(New Zealand) Georgia Perry	(New Zealand) Bronwyn Macgregor	(Australia) Celestine Frantz
2024	(Australia) Isabelle Carnes	(Australia) Katelyn Nicholson	(Australia) Maddison Taylor
2026	(New Zealand) Bronwyn Macgregor	(Australia) Katelyn Nicholson	(Australia) Urszula Chrabaszcz

== U23 ==
=== Road race ===
Year	Winner	2nd	3rd
2007	(New Zealand) Blair James	(New Zealand) Clinton Robert Avery	(New Zealand) Alexander Meenhorst
2009	(Australia) Michael Matthews	(New Zealand) Mat Marshall	(New Zealand) Alex McGregor
2011	(Australia) Richard Lang	(Australia) Nathan Haas	(Australia) Stuart Smith
2014	(Australia) Robert Power	(Australia) Robert-Jon McCarthy	(Australia) George Tansley
2015	(Australia) David Edwards	(New Zealand) Fraser Gough	(Australia) Ayden Toovey
2016	(Australia) Michael Storer	(New Zealand) Chris Harper	(Australia) Cyrus Monk
2017	(Australia) Lucas Hamilton	(Australia) Michael Storer	(Australia) Jai Hindley
2018	(Australia) James Whelan	(Australia) Cyrus Monk	(Australia) Jason Lea
2019	(Australia) Tyler Lindorff	(Australia) Michael Potter	(Australia) Peter Livingstone
2022	(Australia) Brady Gilmore	(Australia) Dylan George	(Australia) Matthew Dinham
2023	(Australia) Liam Walsh	(Australia) Brady Gilmore	(Australia) Declan Trecize
2024	(Australia) Matthew Greenwood	(Australia) Jackson Medway	(Australia) Jack Ward
2026	(Australia) William Heffernan	(Australia) Christian Tuminello	(Australia) Thomas Waites

=== Time trial ===
Year	Winner	2nd	3rd
2007	(New Zealand) Matthew Sillars	(New Zealand) Clinton Robert Avery	(New Zealand) Peter Rennie
2009	(Australia) Jack Anderson	(Australia) Michael Matthews	(New Zealand) Sam Horgan
2011	(Australia) Damien Howson	(Australia) Nick Aitken	(Australia) Aaron Donnelly
2012	(Australia) Damien Howson	(Australia) Edward Bissaker	(Australia) Michael Freiberg
2013	(Australia) Damien Howson	(Australia) Campbell Flakemore	(Australia) Adam Phelan
2014	(Australia) Harry Carpenter	(Australia) Campbell Flakemore	(Australia) Oscar Stevenson
2015	(Australia) Harry Carpenter	(Australia) Daniel Fitter	(Australia) Tom Kaesler
2016	(Australia) Alexander Morgan	(Australia) Oscar Stevenson	(Australia) Michael Storer
2017	(Australia) Liam Magennis	(Australia) Jason Lea	(Australia) Cyrus Monk
2018	(New Zealand) Jake Marryatt	(Australia) Liam Magennis	(Australia) Jason Lea
2019	(Australia) Liam Magennis	(Australia) Alastair Christie-Johnston	(Australia) Jordan Louis
2022	(New Zealand) Logan Currie	(Australia) Dylan George	(New Zealand) Keegan Hornblow
2023	(Australia) Brady Gilmore	(Australia) Hamish McKenzie	(Australia) Oliver Bleddyn
2024	(Australia) Jackson Medway	(New Zealand) Lucas Murphy	(New Zealand) Guy Yarrell
2026	(Australia) Thomas Waites	(Australia) Julian Baudry	(Australia) Dylan Proctor-Parker
