= Lisen Hockings =

Australian cyclist

Personal information
- Nickname: Stretch
- Born: 17 April 1979 (age 47) Perth, Western Australia

Cycling career
- Sport: Cycling
- Current team: Holden Team Gusto Racing
- Role: Time Trialist, Climber

Lisen Hockings is an Australian racing cyclist in Holden Team Gusto Racing. She is also an anaesthetist in Melbourne and has previously played Hockey and Volleyball.

== Results ==
2016
3rd Oceania Cycling Championships road race
2017
1st Oceania Cycling Championships, Road Race
3rd Oceania Cycling Championships time trial
