= 2019 Tour Down Under =

Cycling race

2019 UCI World Tour, race 1 of 38

Race details
- Dates: 15–20 January 2019
- Stages: 6
- Distance: 827.5 km (514.2 mi)
- Winning time: 20h 30' 42"

Results
Jersey awarded to the overall winner	Winner	Daryl Impey (RSA)	(Mitchelton–Scott)
	Second	Richie Porte (AUS)	(Trek–Segafredo)
	Third	Wout Poels (NED)	(Team Sky)
Jersey awarded to the mountains classification winner	Mountains	Jason Lea (AUS)	(UniSA–Australia)
Jersey awarded to the young rider classification winner	Young rider	Chris Hamilton (AUS)	(Team Sunweb)
Jersey awarded to the sprints classification winner	Sprints	Patrick Bevin (NZL)	(CCC Team)
	Team	UAE Team Emirates	

The 2019 Tour Down Under was a road cycling stage race, that took place between 15 and 20 January 2019 in and around Adelaide, South Australia. It was the 21st edition of the Tour Down Under and the first race of the 2019 UCI World Tour.

For the first time in the race's 21-year history, the previous year's winner was able to defend their race title as Mitchelton–Scott's Daryl Impey from South Africa took the overall honours on the final day. Impey had trailed New Zealand's Patrick Bevin (CCC Team) by seven seconds going into the stage, finishing at Willunga Hill, but Bevin lost almost six minutes on the day, due to injuries suffered in a crash the previous day. Although Impey finished third on the stage to Australian Richie Porte of Trek–Segafredo – who won the Willunga stage for the sixth successive year – and Team Sky rider Wout Poels from the Netherlands, Impey won the general classification and the race's final ochre jersey by thirteen seconds from Porte, with Poels a further four seconds arrears (due to the bonus seconds on the finish line) in third place.

Despite not winning the race overall, Bevin took the blue jersey awarded for the sprints classification. In the race's other classifications, UniSA–Australia rider Jason Lea led the mountains classification from the opening day to the finish, edging out Poels on countback, while Chris Hamilton, also from Australia, was the winner of the white jersey for the young rider classification for Team Sunweb, finishing in sixth place overall, after that particular jersey changed hands after every day of racing. The team classification was won by UAE Team Emirates, who led from the opening day onwards, with the team having one stage victory – earned by Jasper Philipsen, who was making his début with a UCI WorldTeam.

== Participating teams ==
As the Tour Down Under was a UCI World Tour event, all eighteen UCI WorldTeams were invited automatically and obliged to enter a team in the race. One other team was given a wildcard entry into the race: UniSA–Australia. Each team was due to enter seven riders, for a total of 133 participants.

Among the field were six previous winners of the race, two of whom – Cameron Meyer, and defending champion Daryl Impey – were racing for the Mitchelton–Scott squad. Other previous winners in the field were Luis León Sánchez (Astana), Bahrain–Merida rider Rohan Dennis, Tom-Jelte Slagter of Team Dimension Data, and Trek–Segafredo's Richie Porte.

Alongside Meyer and Impey at Mitchelton–Scott was Mathew Hayman, who announced in September 2018 that he would retire from professional racing after the 2019 Tour Down Under.

UCI WorldTeams

- AG2R La Mondiale
- Astana
- Bahrain–Merida
- Bora–Hansgrohe
- CCC Team
- Deceuninck–Quick-Step
- Team Dimension Data
- EF Education First
- Groupama–FDJ
- Team Jumbo–Visma
- Team Katusha–Alpecin
- Lotto–Soudal
- Mitchelton–Scott
- Movistar Team
- Team Sunweb
- Trek–Segafredo
- UAE Team Emirates
- Team Sky

Wildcard teams

- UniSA–Australia

== Route ==
The route of the 2019 Tour Down Under was announced at the beginning of August 2018 and centred around the city of Adelaide in South Australia. There were six mass-start road stages and no time trials, with the race concluding with a summit finish at Willunga Hill for the first time. Two days before the start of the Tour, there was a flat criterium race, the People's Choice Classic, which took place in Rymill Park and which was suited for the sprinters. It was won by Caleb Ewan (Lotto–Soudal) in a sprint finish.

After the People's Choice Classic, it was announced that the second stage would be shortened due to forecasted high temperatures. Initially scheduled for 149 kilometres (93 miles), the stage was reduced to 122.1 kilometres (75.9 miles); a section of the route between Mount Pleasant and Springton via Williamstown was re-routed to bypass Williamstown altogether. The following morning, a minor adjustment was made to the finish of the opening stage in Port Adelaide, as a 3.4-kilometre (2.1-mile) finishing circuit was removed due to expected strong winds.

Stage schedule
Stage	Date	Route	Distance	Type	Winner
1	15 January	North Adelaide to Port Adelaide	129 km (80.2 mi) (Note: Stage reduced from 132.4 kilometres (82 miles), due to expected strong winds.)	Flat stage	Elia Viviani (ITA)
2	16 January	Norwood to Angaston	122.1 km (75.9 mi) (Note: Stage reduced from 149 kilometres (93 miles), due to expected extreme heat.)	Flat stage	Patrick Bevin (NZL)
3	17 January	Lobethal to Uraidla	146.2 km (90.8 mi)	Hilly stage	Peter Sagan (SVK)
4	18 January	Unley to Campbelltown	129.2 km (80.3 mi)	Hilly stage	Daryl Impey (RSA)
5	19 January	Glenelg to Strathalbyn	149.5 km (92.9 mi)	Flat stage	Jasper Philipsen (BEL)
6	20 January	McLaren Vale to Willunga Hill	151.5 km (94.1 mi)	Medium-mountain stage	Richie Porte (AUS)

== Stages ==
=== Stage 1 ===
15 January 2019 — North Adelaide to Port Adelaide, 129 km (80 mi)

Result of Stage 1
Rank	Rider	Team	Time
1	Elia Viviani (ITA)	Deceuninck–Quick-Step	3h 19' 47"
2	Max Walscheid (GER)	Team Sunweb	+ 0"
3	Jakub Mareczko (ITA)	CCC Team	+ 0"
4	Phil Bauhaus (GER)	Bahrain–Merida	+ 0"
5	Ryan Gibbons (RSA)	Team Dimension Data	+ 0"
6	Jasper Philipsen (BEL)	UAE Team Emirates	+ 0"
7	Kristoffer Halvorsen (NOR)	Team Sky	+ 0"
8	Peter Sagan (SVK)	Bora–Hansgrohe	+ 0"
9	Danny van Poppel (NED)	Team Jumbo–Visma	+ 0"
10	Daniel Hoelgaard (NOR)	Groupama–FDJ	+ 0"

General classification after Stage 1
Rank	Rider	Team	Time
1	Elia Viviani (ITA)	Deceuninck–Quick-Step	3h 19' 37"
2	Max Walscheid (GER)	Team Sunweb	+ 4"
3	Patrick Bevin (NZL)	CCC Team	+ 5"
4	Michael Storer (AUS)	Team Sunweb	+ 5"
5	Jakub Mareczko (ITA)	CCC Team	+ 6"
6	Jason Lea (AUS)	UniSA–Australia	+ 8"
7	Phil Bauhaus (GER)	Bahrain–Merida	+ 10"
8	Ryan Gibbons (RSA)	Team Dimension Data	+ 10"
9	Jasper Philipsen (BEL)	UAE Team Emirates	+ 10"
10	Kristoffer Halvorsen (NOR)	Team Sky	+ 10"

=== Stage 2 ===
16 January 2019 — Norwood to Angaston, 122.1 km (76 mi)

Result of Stage 2
Rank	Rider	Team	Time
1	Patrick Bevin (NZL)	CCC Team	3h 14' 31"
2	Caleb Ewan (AUS)	Lotto–Soudal	+ 0"
3	Peter Sagan (SVK)	Bora–Hansgrohe	+ 0"
4	Danny van Poppel (NED)	Team Jumbo–Visma	+ 0"
5	Jasper Philipsen (BEL)	UAE Team Emirates	+ 0"
6	Phil Bauhaus (GER)	Bahrain–Merida	+ 0"
7	Elia Viviani (ITA)	Deceuninck–Quick-Step	+ 0"
8	Luis León Sánchez (ESP)	Astana	+ 0"
9	Kiel Reijnen (USA)	Trek–Segafredo	+ 0"
10	Kristoffer Halvorsen (NOR)	Team Sky	+ 0"

General classification after Stage 2
Rank	Rider	Team	Time
1	Patrick Bevin (NZL)	CCC Team	6h 34' 03"
2	Elia Viviani (ITA)	Deceuninck–Quick-Step	+ 5"
3	Caleb Ewan (AUS)	Lotto–Soudal	+ 9"
4	Max Walscheid (GER)	Team Sunweb	+ 9"
5	Artyom Zakharov (KAZ)	Astana	+ 9"
6	Jason Lea (AUS)	UniSA–Australia	+ 10"
7	Michael Storer (AUS)	Team Sunweb	+ 10"
8	Peter Sagan (SVK)	Bora–Hansgrohe	+ 11"
9	Jakub Mareczko (ITA)	CCC Team	+ 11"
10	Jaime Castrillo (ESP)	Movistar Team	+ 12"

=== Stage 3 ===
17 January 2019 — Lobethal to Uraidla, 146.2 km (90.8 mi)

Result of Stage 3
Rank	Rider	Team	Time
1	Peter Sagan (SVK)	Bora–Hansgrohe	3h 46' 06"
2	Luis León Sánchez (ESP)	Astana	+ 0"
3	Daryl Impey (RSA)	Mitchelton–Scott	+ 0"
4	Danny van Poppel (NED)	Team Jumbo–Visma	+ 0"
5	Patrick Bevin (NZL)	CCC Team	+ 0"
6	Jan Polanc (SLO)	UAE Team Emirates	+ 0"
7	Ruben Guerreiro (POR)	Team Katusha–Alpecin	+ 0"
8	Tadej Pogačar (SLO)	UAE Team Emirates	+ 0"
9	Chris Hamilton (AUS)	Team Sunweb	+ 0"
10	Domenico Pozzovivo (ITA)	Bahrain–Merida	+ 0"

General classification after Stage 3
Rank	Rider	Team	Time
1	Patrick Bevin (NZL)	CCC Team	10h 20' 09"
2	Peter Sagan (SVK)	Bora–Hansgrohe	+ 1"
3	Luis León Sánchez (ESP)	Astana	+ 9"
4	Michael Storer (AUS)	Team Sunweb	+ 10"
5	Daryl Impey (RSA)	Mitchelton–Scott	+ 11"
6	Danny van Poppel (NED)	Team Jumbo–Visma	+ 15"
7	Jan Polanc (SLO)	UAE Team Emirates	+ 15"
8	Ryan Gibbons (RSA)	Team Dimension Data	+ 15"
9	Chris Hamilton (AUS)	Team Sunweb	+ 15"
10	George Bennett (NZL)	Team Jumbo–Visma	+ 15"

=== Stage 4 ===
18 January 2019 — Unley to Campbelltown, 129.2 km (80.3 mi)

Result of Stage 4
Rank	Rider	Team	Time
1	Daryl Impey (RSA)	Mitchelton–Scott	3h 03' 27"
2	Patrick Bevin (NZL)	CCC Team	+ 0"
3	Luis León Sánchez (ESP)	Astana	+ 0"
4	Ruben Guerreiro (POR)	Team Katusha–Alpecin	+ 0"
5	Rubén Fernández (ESP)	Movistar Team	+ 0"
6	George Bennett (NZL)	Team Jumbo–Visma	+ 0"
7	Diego Ulissi (ITA)	UAE Team Emirates	+ 0"
8	Michael Woods (CAN)	EF Education First	+ 0"
9	Chris Hamilton (AUS)	Team Sunweb	+ 0"
10	Dylan van Baarle (NED)	Team Sky	+ 0"

General classification after Stage 4
Rank	Rider	Team	Time
1	Patrick Bevin (NZL)	CCC Team	13h 23' 30"
2	Daryl Impey (RSA)	Mitchelton–Scott	+ 7"
3	Luis León Sánchez (ESP)	Astana	+ 11"
4	Chris Hamilton (AUS)	Team Sunweb	+ 21"
5	Ryan Gibbons (RSA)	Team Dimension Data	+ 21"
6	Jan Polanc (SLO)	UAE Team Emirates	+ 21"
7	George Bennett (NZL)	Team Jumbo–Visma	+ 21"
8	Ruben Guerreiro (POR)	Team Katusha–Alpecin	+ 21"
9	Diego Ulissi (ITA)	UAE Team Emirates	+ 21"
10	Michael Woods (CAN)	EF Education First	+ 21"

=== Stage 5 ===
19 January 2019 — Glenelg to Strathalbyn, 149.5 km (92.9 mi)

Result of Stage 5
Rank	Rider	Team	Time
1	Jasper Philipsen (BEL)	UAE Team Emirates	3h 37' 00"
2	Peter Sagan (SVK)	Bora–Hansgrohe	+ 0"
3	Danny van Poppel (NED)	Team Jumbo–Visma	+ 0"
4	Jens Debusschere (BEL)	Team Katusha–Alpecin	+ 0"
5	Elia Viviani (ITA)	Deceuninck–Quick-Step	+ 0"
6	Phil Bauhaus (GER)	Bahrain–Merida	+ 0"
7	Cees Bol (NED)	Team Sunweb	+ 0"
8	Ryan Gibbons (RSA)	Team Dimension Data	+ 0"
9	Wout Poels (NED)	Team Sky	+ 0"
10	Davide Ballerini (ITA)	Astana	+ 0"

General classification after Stage 5
Rank	Rider	Team	Time
1	Patrick Bevin (NZL)	CCC Team	17h 00' 25"
2	Daryl Impey (RSA)	Mitchelton–Scott	+ 7"
3	Luis León Sánchez (ESP)	Astana	+ 16"
4	Ryan Gibbons (RSA)	Team Dimension Data	+ 26"
5	Jan Polanc (SLO)	UAE Team Emirates	+ 26"
6	Ruben Guerreiro (POR)	Team Katusha–Alpecin	+ 26"
7	George Bennett (NZL)	Team Jumbo–Visma	+ 26"
8	Chris Hamilton (AUS)	Team Sunweb	+ 26"
9	Wout Poels (NED)	Team Sky	+ 26"
10	Michael Woods (CAN)	EF Education First	+ 26"

=== Stage 6 ===
20 January 2019 — McLaren Vale to Willunga Hill, 151.5 km (94.1 mi)

Result of Stage 6
Rank	Rider	Team	Time
1	Richie Porte (AUS)	Trek–Segafredo	3h 30' 14"
2	Wout Poels (NED)	Team Sky	+ 0"
3	Daryl Impey (RSA)	Mitchelton–Scott	+ 0"
4	Rohan Dennis (AUS)	Bahrain–Merida	+ 3"
5	Luis León Sánchez (ESP)	Astana	+ 6"
6	Chris Hamilton (AUS)	Team Sunweb	+ 10"
7	Michael Woods (CAN)	EF Education First	+ 15"
8	Diego Ulissi (ITA)	UAE Team Emirates	+ 17"
9	Tom-Jelte Slagter (NED)	Team Dimension Data	+ 17"
10	Dries Devenyns (BEL)	Deceuninck–Quick-Step	+ 17"

Final general classification
Rank	Rider	Team	Time
1	Daryl Impey (RSA)	Mitchelton–Scott	20h 30' 42"
2	Richie Porte (AUS)	Trek–Segafredo	+ 13"
3	Wout Poels (NED)	Team Sky	+ 17"
4	Luis León Sánchez (ESP)	Astana	+ 19"
5	Rohan Dennis (AUS)	Bahrain–Merida	+ 26"
6	Chris Hamilton (AUS)	Team Sunweb	+ 33"
7	Michael Woods (CAN)	EF Education First	+ 38"
8	Ruben Guerreiro (POR)	Team Katusha–Alpecin	+ 40"
9	Diego Ulissi (ITA)	UAE Team Emirates	+ 40"
10	Dries Devenyns (BEL)	Deceuninck–Quick-Step	+ 40"

== Classification leadership table ==
In the 2019 Tour Down Under, four different jerseys were awarded. For the general classification, calculated by adding each cyclist's finishing times on each stage, and allowing time bonuses for the first three finishers at intermediate sprints and at the finish of mass-start stages, the leader received an ochre jersey. This classification was considered the most important of the 2018 Tour Down Under, and the winner of the classification was considered the winner of the race.

Additionally, there was a sprints classification, which awarded a blue jersey, a change from green in 2018. In the sprints classification, cyclists received points for finishing in the top 10 in a stage. For winning a stage, a rider earned 15 points, with one point fewer per place down to 6 points for 10th place. Points towards the classification could also be accrued at intermediate sprint points during each stage; these intermediate sprints also offered bonus seconds towards the general classification. There was also a mountains classification, the leadership of which was marked by a white jersey with navy polka dots. In the mountains classification, points were won by reaching the top of a climb before other cyclists, with more points available for the higher-categorised climbs.

The fourth jersey represented the young rider classification, marked by a white jersey. This was decided in the same way as the general classification, but only riders under the age of 26 were eligible to be ranked in the classification. There was also a classification for teams, in which the times of the best three cyclists per team on each stage were added together; the leading team at the end of the race was the team with the lowest total time. In addition, there was a combativity award given after each stage to the rider(s) considered, by a jury, to have "instigated the most attacks, breakaways or assisted their teammates to the best advantage". The winner of the award wore a red number bib in the following stage.

Stage	Winner	General classification	Mountains classification	Sprint classification	Young rider classification	Most competitive rider(s)	Team classification
1	Elia Viviani	Elia Viviani	Jason Lea	Elia Viviani	Michael Storer	Patrick Bevin	UAE Team Emirates
2	Patrick Bevin	Patrick Bevin	Jason Lea	Elia Viviani	Caleb Ewan	Mathieu Ladagnous	UAE Team Emirates
3	Peter Sagan	Patrick Bevin	Jason Lea	Peter Sagan	Michael Storer	Manuele Boaro	UAE Team Emirates
4	Daryl Impey	Patrick Bevin	Jason Lea	Patrick Bevin	Chris Hamilton	Thomas De Gendt	UAE Team Emirates
5	Jasper Philipsen	Patrick Bevin	Jason Lea	Patrick Bevin	Ryan Gibbons	Mathieu Ladagnous	UAE Team Emirates
6	Richie Porte	Daryl Impey	Jason Lea	Patrick Bevin	Chris Hamilton	Danny van Poppel	UAE Team Emirates
Final		Daryl Impey	Jason Lea	Patrick Bevin	Chris Hamilton	No final award	UAE Team Emirates

== Final classification standings ==
Legend
Denotes the winner of the general classification	Denotes the winner of the mountains classification
Denotes the winner of the points classification	Denotes the winner of the young rider classification

=== General classification ===
Final general classification
Rank	Rider	Team	Time
1	Daryl Impey (RSA)	Mitchelton–Scott	20h 30' 42"
2	Richie Porte (AUS)	Trek–Segafredo	+ 13"
3	Wout Poels (NED)	Team Sky	+ 17"
4	Luis León Sánchez (ESP)	Astana	+ 19"
5	Rohan Dennis (AUS)	Bahrain–Merida	+ 26"
6	Chris Hamilton (AUS)	Team Sunweb	+ 33"
7	Michael Woods (CAN)	EF Education First	+ 38"
8	Ruben Guerreiro (POR)	Team Katusha–Alpecin	+ 40"
9	Diego Ulissi (ITA)	UAE Team Emirates	+ 40"
10	Dries Devenyns (BEL)	Deceuninck–Quick-Step	+ 40"

=== Sprints classification ===
Final sprints classification
Rank	Rider	Team	Points
1	Patrick Bevin (NZL)	CCC Team	56
2	Danny van Poppel (NED)	Team Jumbo–Visma	54
3	Peter Sagan (SVK)	Bora–Hansgrohe	50
4	Daryl Impey (RSA)	Mitchelton–Scott	49
5	Luis León Sánchez (ESP)	Astana	46
6	Elia Viviani (ITA)	Deceuninck–Quick-Step	45
7	Jasper Philipsen (BEL)	UAE Team Emirates	38
8	Phil Bauhaus (GER)	Bahrain–Merida	32
9	Chris Hamilton (AUS)	Team Sunweb	24
10	Wout Poels (NED)	Team Sky	21

=== Mountains classification ===
Final mountains classification
Rank	Rider	Team	Points
1	Jason Lea (AUS)	UniSA–Australia	30
2	Wout Poels (NED)	Team Sky	30
3	Richie Porte (AUS)	Trek–Segafredo	28
4	George Bennett (NZL)	Team Jumbo–Visma	16
5	Kenny Elissonde (FRA)	Team Sky	16
6	Manuele Boaro (ITA)	Astana	14
7	Artyom Zakharov (KAZ)	Astana	12
8	Daryl Impey (RSA)	Mitchelton–Scott	8
9	Michael Woods (CAN)	EF Education First	8
10	Nick White (AUS)	UniSA–Australia	8

=== Young rider classification ===
Final young rider classification
Rank	Rider	Team	Time
1	Chris Hamilton (AUS)	Team Sunweb	20h 31' 15"
2	Ruben Guerreiro (POR)	Team Katusha–Alpecin	+ 7"
3	Ryan Gibbons (RSA)	Team Dimension Data	+ 10"
4	Tadej Pogačar (SLO)	UAE Team Emirates	+ 10"
5	Jai Hindley (AUS)	Team Sunweb	+ 33"
6	Lucas Hamilton (AUS)	Mitchelton–Scott	+ 45"
7	Ben O'Connor (AUS)	Team Dimension Data	+ 54"
8	Gregor Mühlberger (AUT)	Bora–Hansgrohe	+ 1' 02"
9	Chris Harper (AUS)	UniSA–Australia	+ 1' 15"
10	Michael Storer (AUS)	Team Sunweb	+ 1' 27"

=== Teams classification ===
Final teams classification
Rank	Team	Time
1	UAE Team Emirates	61h 34' 22"
2	Bahrain–Merida	+ 43"
3	Team Dimension Data	+ 55"
4	Team Sunweb	+ 1' 11"
5	Movistar Team	+ 1' 54"
6	Mitchelton–Scott	+ 2' 10"
7	Team Jumbo–Visma	+ 2' 50"
8	Team Sky	+ 5' 33"
9	Groupama–FDJ	+ 6' 36"
10	Bora–Hansgrohe	+ 7' 24"
