= 2011 UCI Road World Championships – Women's junior time trial =

Women's junior time trial
2011 UCI Road World Championships

Race details
- Dates: 19 September 2011
- Stages: 1
- Distance: 13.9 km (8.637 mi)

The Women's junior time trial of the 2011 UCI Road World Championships was a cycling event that took place on 19 September 2011 in Copenhagen, Denmark.

== Final classification ==
	Cyclist	Nation		Time
1st place, gold medalist(s)	Jessica Allen	Australia	en	19 min 19 s
2nd place, silver medalist(s)	Elinor Barker	Great Britain	+	2 s
3rd place, bronze medalist(s)	Mieke Kröger	Germany		3 s
4	Thalita de Jong	Netherlands		15 s
5	Rossella Ratto	Italy		31 s
6	Georgia Williams	New Zealand		44 s
7	Annie Ewart	Canada		46 s
8	Kamilla Sofie Valin	Denmark		46 s
9	Mathilde Favre	France		51 s
10	Alexandra Chekina	Russia		52 s
