= Michael Freiberg =

Australian bicycle racer

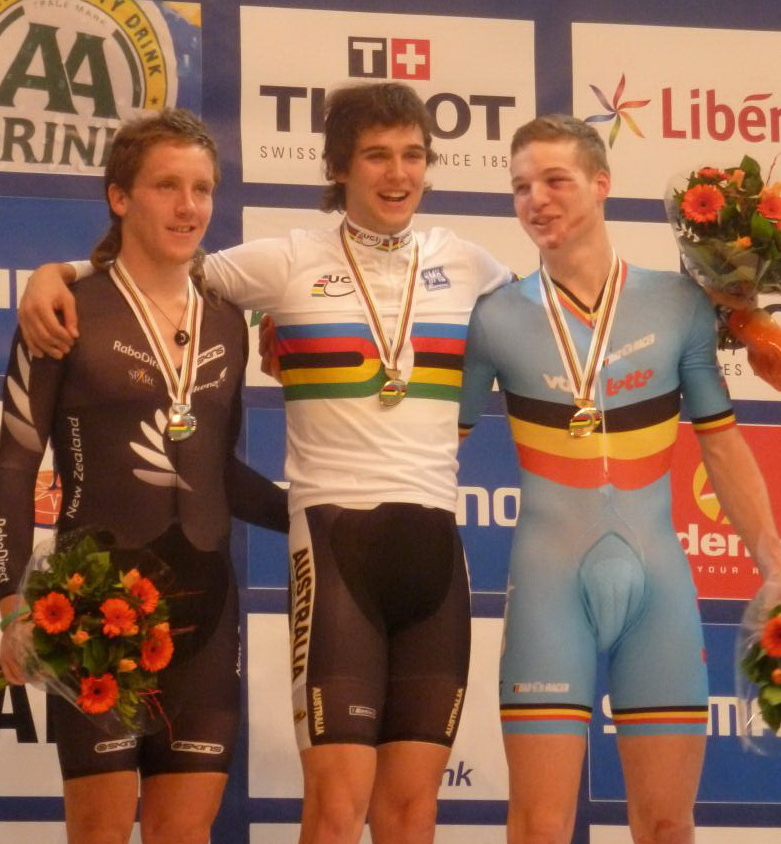
- Freiberg (centre) at the 2011 Track Cycling World Championships

Personal information
- Full name: Michael Freiberg
- Born: 10 October 1990 (age 36) Hong Kong
- Height: 1.93 m (6 ft 4 in)
- Weight: 82 kg (181 lb)

Cycling career
- Sport: Cycling
- Current team: ARA Skip Capital
- Disciplines: Track; Road
- Role: Rider
- Rider type: Omnium (track)

Amateur teams
- 2009: Australian Institute of Sport
- 2013: Bianchi–Lotto–Nieuwe Hoop Tielen

Professional teams
- 2010: Team Jayco–Skins
- 2011: V Australia
- 2012: Team Jayco–AIS
- 2017–2018: IsoWhey Sports SwissWellness
- 2019–: Pro Racing Sunshine Coast

Major wins
- Single-day races and Classics National Road Race Championships (2019)
Medal record
Representing Australia
Men's track cycling
Commonwealth Games
Silver medal – second place	2010 Delhi	Scratch race

Michael Freiberg (born 10 October 1990) is an Australian track and road cyclist, who currently rides for UCI Continental team ARA Skip Capital.

== Career ==
=== Track career ===
At the 2010 Commonwealth Games, Freiberg was part of the Australian squad which took gold in the team pursuit, and also took an individual silver in the scratch race. He became world champion in the omnium event at the 2011 UCI Track Cycling World Championships. However Cycling Australia did not select him for either the team pursuit or omnium at the 2012 UCI Track Cycling World Championships, thus preventing him from defending his title on home soil in Melbourne, and he was similarly not picked for the Australian squad for the 2012 Summer Olympics, being passed over in favour of Glenn O'Shea for the omnium in both championships.

=== Hiatus ===
Freiberg subsequently put his racing career on hold in order to develop the Automated Integrated Resistance hub (AIRhub), a resistance training unit designed to simulate mountain riding on flat roads, which is used by a number of UCI WorldTour professionals in their training, including André Greipel, Mathew Hayman, Adam Hansen, Esteban Chaves and Luke Durbridge.

=== Return to cycling ===
Freiberg subsequently returned to competition in 2017, joining IsoWhey Sports SwissWellness in May of that year with the aim of competing for Australia at the 2018 Commonwealth Games on the Gold Coast, Queensland. In 2019 Freiberg won the Australian National Road Race Championships.

== Major results ==
=== Road ===
2012
2nd Overall Olympia's Tour
Oceania Road Championships

3rd Time trial
5th Road race

3rd Trofeo Internazionale Bastianelli
2017
6th Grand Prix de la ville de Pérenchies
2018
4th Ronde van Overijssel
6th Overall Tour of China II
2019
1st Road race, National Road Championships
3rd Time trial, Oceania Road Championships
9th Halle–Ingooigem
2022
3rd Time trial, Oceania Road Championships
