= Michael Potter (cyclist) =

Australian bicycle racer

Personal information
- Full name: Michael Potter
- Born: 6 November 1997 (age 28) Hornsby, New South Wales, Australia

Cycling career
- Sport: Cycling
- Discipline: Road
- Role: Rider

Amateur teams
- 2016: GPM Stulz
- 2017: Tinelli Powersteam

Professional team
- 2018–2020: ACA–Ride Sunshine Coast

Michael Potter (born 6 November 1997) is an Australian cyclist, who most recently rode for UCI Continental team ARA Pro Racing Sunshine Coast.

Potter is from the northern suburbs of Sydney where he was born in Hornsby, New South Wales in 1997.

In 2018, Potter won the overall classification at the Tour de Tochigi in Japan. Also during the race, he won the opening individual time trial and stage 2. He also finished first in the young rider classification. The next year he started competing in the 2019 UCI World Tour as one of the youngest riders at the age of 21.

== Major results ==
2018
1st Overall Tour de Tochigi

1st Stages 1 & 2
1st Young rider classification

3rd Road race, National Under-23 Road Championships
5th Overall New Zealand Cycle Classic
9th Oita Urban Classic
