= Campbell Flakemore =

Australian cyclist (born 1992)

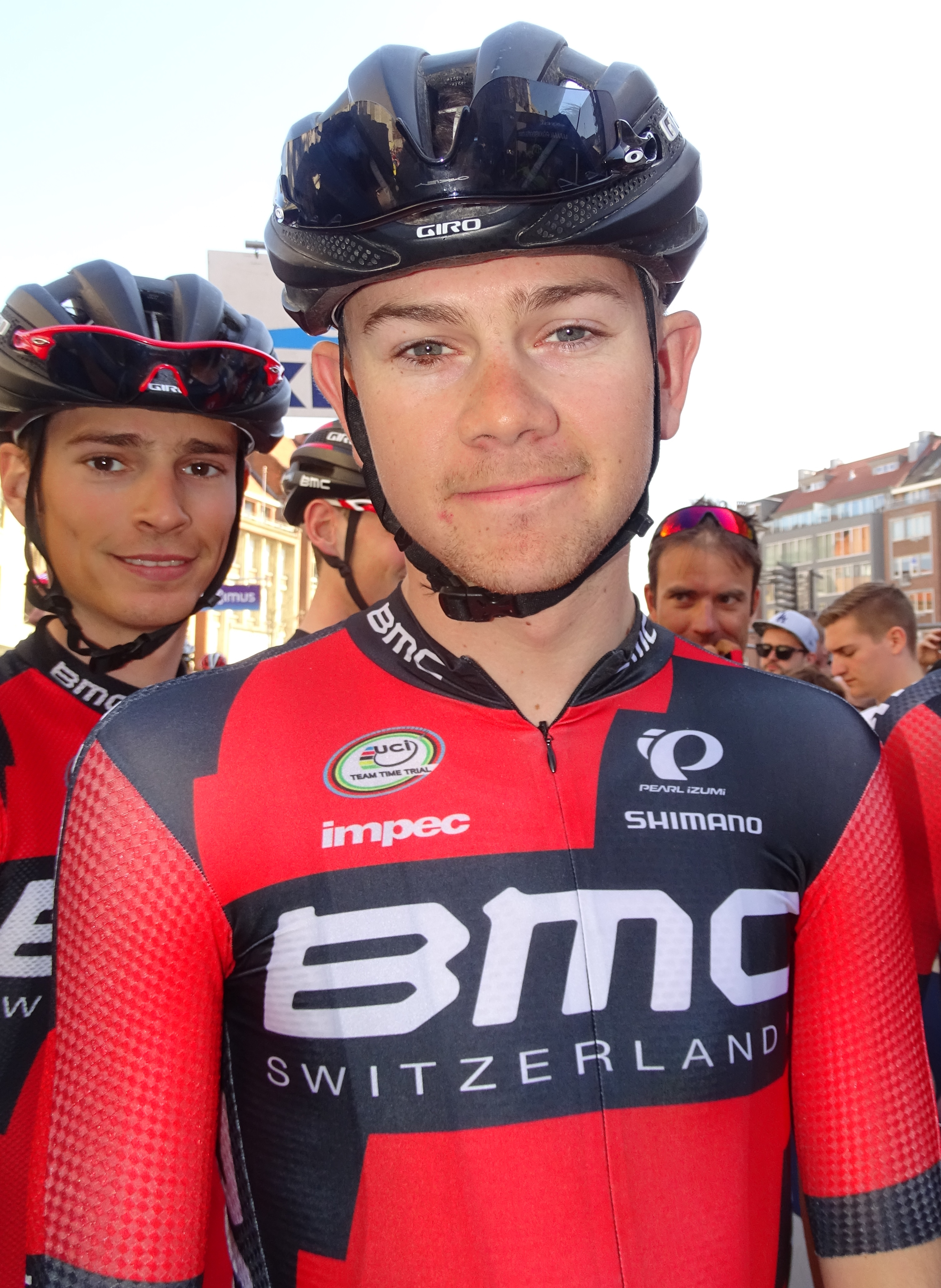
- Flakemore in 2015.

Personal information
- Full name: Campbell Flakemore
- Nickname: Flakey
- Born: 6 August 1992 (age 34) Australia

Cycling career
- Sport: Cycling
- Current team: Retired
- Discipline: Road
- Role: Rider
- Rider type: Time trialist

Professional teams
- 2011–2014: Genesys Wealth Advisers
- 2015: BMC Racing Team
Medal record
Men's road bicycle racing
Representing Australia
World Championships
| Gold medal – first place | 2014 Ponferrada | Men's under-23 time trial |

Campbell Flakemore (born 6 August 1992) is an Australian former professional cyclist, who rode professionally between 2011 and 2015 for the Avanti Racing Team and BMC Racing Team squads.

After winning the men's under-23 time trial at the 2014 UCI Road World Championships, he was signed to a neo-pro contract with BMC Racing Team, and identified as a potential Grand Tour winner by Cadel Evans. However, at the end of 2015 he decided to retire from cycling.

== Major results ==
2011
6th Time trial, Oceania Under-23 Road Championships
2012
Tour of Tasmania

1st Stages 1 (TTT) & 8

1st Stage 9 Tour of the Great South Coast
1st Stage 9 Tour of the Murray River
3rd Time trial, National Under-23 Road Championships
3rd Overall New Zealand Cycle Classic

1st Stage 1 (ITT)

5th Time trial, Oceania Road Championships
2013
1st Chrono Champenois
1st Stage 5 (ITT) Thüringen Rundfahrt der U23
2nd Time trial, Oceania Under-23 Road Championships
3rd Time trial, National Under-23 Road Championships
4th Time trial, UCI Under-23 Road World Championships
9th Overall Olympia's Tour

1st Stage 5 (ITT)

9th La Côte Picarde
2014
1st Time trial, UCI Under-23 Road World Championships
1st Prologue Tour de l'Avenir
2nd Time trial, Oceania Under-23 Road Championships
3rd Chrono Champenois
4th Time trial, National Under-23 Road Championships
2015
National Road Championships

4th Road race
6th Time trial
