= 2013 UCI Road World Championships – Men's under-23 time trial =

Men's under-23 time trial
2013 UCI Road World Championships
- Rainbow jersey

Race details
- Dates: 23 September 2013
- Stages: 1

The Men's under-23 time trial of the 2013 UCI Road World Championships took place in Tuscany, Italy on 23 September 2013.

== Final classification ==
Rank	Rider	Country	Time
1	Damien Howson	Australia	49 min 49 s 97
2	Yoann Paillot	France	+ 57 s 11
3	Lasse Norman Hansen	Denmark	+ 1 min 10 s 13
4	Campbell Flakemore	Australia	+ 1 min 22 s 30
5	Lawson Craddock	United States	+ 1 min 41 s 38
6	Stefan Küng	Switzerland	+ 1 min 46 s 75
7	Ryan Mullen	Ireland	+ 1 min 47 s 09
8	Victor Campenaerts	Belgium	+ 1 min 47 s 71
9	Daniil Fominykh	Kazakhstan	+ 2 min 5 s 73
10	Eduardo Sepúlveda	Argentina	+ 2 min 10 s 55
11	Frederik Frison	Belgium	+ 2 min 31 s 55
12	Maximilian Schachmann	Germany	+ 2 min 32 s 73
13	Jasha Sütterlin	Germany	+ 2 min 37 s 44
14	Yves Lampaert	Belgium	+ 2 min 37 s 66
15	Marlen Zmorka	Ukraine	+ 2 min 39 s 11
16	Oleksandr Golovash	Ukraine	+ 2 min 40 s 52
17	Brayan Ramírez	Colombia	+ 2 min 41 s 73
18	Szymon Rekita	Poland	+ 2 min 42 s 38
19	Alexander Evtushenko	Russia	+ 2 min 43 s 19
20	Rasmus Sterobo	Denmark	+ 2 min 49 s 11
21	Nathan Brown	United States	+ 2 min 52 s 94
22	Marcus Fåglum Karlsson	Sweden	+ 3 min 2 s 58
23	Dylan van Baarle	Netherlands	+ 3 min 6 s 66
24	Łukasz Wiśniowski	Poland	+ 3 min 7 s 38
25	Louis Meintjes	South Africa	+ 3 min 25 s 12
26	James Oram	New Zealand	+ 3 min 27 s 80
27	Viktor Manakov	Russia	+ 3 min 28 s 83
28	Marcus Christie	Ireland	+ 3 min 34 s 27
29	Davide Martinelli	Italy	+ 3 min 40 s 47
30	Alexis Gougeard	France	+ 3 min 41 s 44
31	Amund Grøndahl Jansen	Norway	+ 3 min 52 s 36
32	Ioannis Spanopoulos	Greece	+ 3 min 54 s 18
33	Alexander Cataford	Canada	+ 4 min 5 s 51
34	Rafael Reis	Portugal	+ 4 min 8 s 42
35	Bruno Maltar	Croatia	+ 4 min 14 s 58
36	Michael Vink	New Zealand	+ 4 min 15 s 64
37	Mario González Salas	Spain	+ 4 min 16 s 24
38	Felix Großschartner	Austria	+ 4 min 19 s 18
39	Josef Černý	Czech Republic	+ 4 min 19 s 51
40	Andžs Flaksis	Latvia	+ 4 min 20 s 20
41	Truls Engen Korsæth	Norway	+ 4 min 24 s 45
42	Žydrūnas Savickas	Lithuania	+ 4 min 31 s 51
43	Gabriel Chavanne	Switzerland	+ 4 min 45 s 37
44	Meron Teshome	Eritrea	+ 4 min 46 s 13
45	Daniel Turek	Czech Republic	+ 4 min 52 s 08
46	Zhandos Bizhigitov	Kazakhstan	+ 4 min 54 s 73
47	Andris Vosekalns	Latvia	+ 4 min 58 s 36
48	Sjors Roosen	Netherlands	+ 4 min 59 s 89
49	Simone Antonini	Italy	+ 5 min 9 s 82
50	Tsgabu Grmay	Ethiopia	+ 5 min 15 s 41
51	Facundo Lezica	Argentina	+ 5 min 23 s 26
52	Viktor Okishev	Kazakhstan	+ 5 min 29 s 04
53	Endrik Puntso	Estonia	+ 5 min 40 s 33
54	Johannes Christoffel Nel	South Africa	+ 5 min 50 s 97
55	Matej Mohorič	Slovenia	+ 5 min 52 s 75
56	José Luis Rodríguez Aguilar	Chile	+ 5 min 54 s 84
57	Mark Dzamastagic	Slovenia	+ 6 min 13 s 42
58	Carlos Eduardo Quisphe	Ecuador	+ 6 min 23 s 79
59	Burr Ho	Hong Kong	+ 6 min 29 s 87
60	Mekseb Debesay	Eritrea	+ 6 min 43 s 26
61	Lukas Pöstlberger	Austria	+ 6 min 47 s 43
62	Feritcan Şamlı	Turkey	+ 6 min 59 s 95
63	Eduard-Michael Grosu	Romania	+ 7 min 4 s 70
64	Zoltán Sipos	Romania	+ 7 min 7 s 12
65	Paulius Šiškevičius	Lithuania	+ 7 min 16 s 89
66	Ábel Kenyeres	Hungary	+ 7 min 25 s 50
67	Mikel Iturria	Spain	+ 7 min 31 s 24
68	Edison Bravo	Chile	+ 7 min 33 s 75
69	Oleg Sergeev	Israel	+ 8 min 15 s 99
70	Cristian Raileanu	Moldova	+ 8 min 17 s 32
71	Adil Barbari	Algeria	+ 9 min 29 s 63
72	Adrian Alvarado	Chile	+ 9 min 55 s 63
73	Emiljano Stojku	Albania	+ 10 min 28 s 89
74	Ilhan Celik	Turkey	+ 12 min 14 s 74
-	Juan Enrique Aldapa	Mexico	DNS
