= Felicity Wardlaw =

Australian cyclist

Personal information
- Born: 14 December 1977 (age 48) Australia

Cycling career
- Sport: Cycling
- Discipline: Road cycling

Felicity Wardlaw (born 14 December 1977) is a female road cyclist from Australia. She became national time trial champion in 2014.
