= Jason Lea =

Australian cyclist

Personal information
- Full name: Jason Lea
- Born: 25 June 1996 (age 30)

Cycling career
- Sport: Cycling
- Discipline: Road
- Role: Rider

Professional teams
- 2017–2018: IsoWhey Sports SwissWellness
- 2019: Team BridgeLane
- 2020: Maloja Pushbikers

Jason Lea (born 25 June 1996) is an Australian racing cyclist, who most recently rode for UCI Continental team Maloja Pushbikers. In January 2019, he won the mountains classification at the 2019 Tour Down Under.

== Major results ==
2018
7th Overall Tour de Taiwan
2019
1st Mountains classification Tour Down Under
