= ARA Skip Capital =

Australian cycling team

Team information
- UCI code: ACA
- Registered: Australia
- Founded: 2018
- Discipline: Road
- Status: Club (UCI Continental 2018–2024)

Key personnel
- General manager: Ben Kersten
- Team manager: Henk Vogels

Team name history
- 2018 2019 2020–2022 2023–: Australian Cycling Academy–Ride Sunshine Coast; Pro Racing Sunshine Coast; ARA Pro Racing Sunshine Coast; ARA Skip Capital

ARA Skip Capital is an Australian cycling team established in 2018, gaining UCI Continental status the same year.

The team closed their continental and elite/u23 chapter in 2024, citing economic pressures. In 2025, the team operates as an u/19 development program.

== Team roster ==
As of 13 February 2024.

Rider	Date of birth
Blake Agnoletto (AUS)	21 October 2002 (age 23)
Oliver Bleddyn (AUS)	27 January 2002 (age 24)
Joshua Cranage (AUS)	14 October 2005 (age 20)
William Eaves (AUS)	2 July 2004 (age 22)
Brady Gilmore (AUS)	14 April 2001 (age 25)
Nate Hadden (AUS)	19 November 2005 (age 20)

Rider	Date of birth
Cohen Jessen (AUS)	31 December 2005 (age 20)
Lachlan Miller (AUS)	4 January 2004 (age 22)
Ngai Chung Ki (HKG)	11 June 2004 (age 22)
Dylan Proctor-Parker (AUS)	12 December 2004 (age 21)
Tyler Tomkinson (AUS)	23 November 2004 (age 21)
Declan Trezise (AUS)	30 June 2002 (age 24)

== Major wins ==
2018
Australia U23 National Criterium Championships, Cameron Scott
Stage 2 New Zealand Cycle Classic, Cameron Scott
Overall Tour de Tochigi, Michael Potter

Stages 1 & 2, Michael Potter
Young rider classification, Michael Potter

Stage 5 Tour of Qinghai Lake, Cameron Scott

2019
Australia National Road Race Championships, Michael Freiberg
Stage 2 Tour of Quanzhou Bay, Matthew Rice

2020
Stage 2 Tour de Langkawi, Taj Jones
Stage 4 Tour of Poyang Lake, Kane Richards

2023
Stage 3 Tour de Kyushu, Declan Trezise

Young rider classification, William Eaves

== Continental & national champions ==
2018
Australia U23 Criterium, Cameron Scott

2019
Australia Road Race, Michael Freiberg

2023
Oceania U23 Time Trial, Brady Gilmore
Oceania Junior Time Trial, Wil Holmes
