= Women's cycling in Australia =

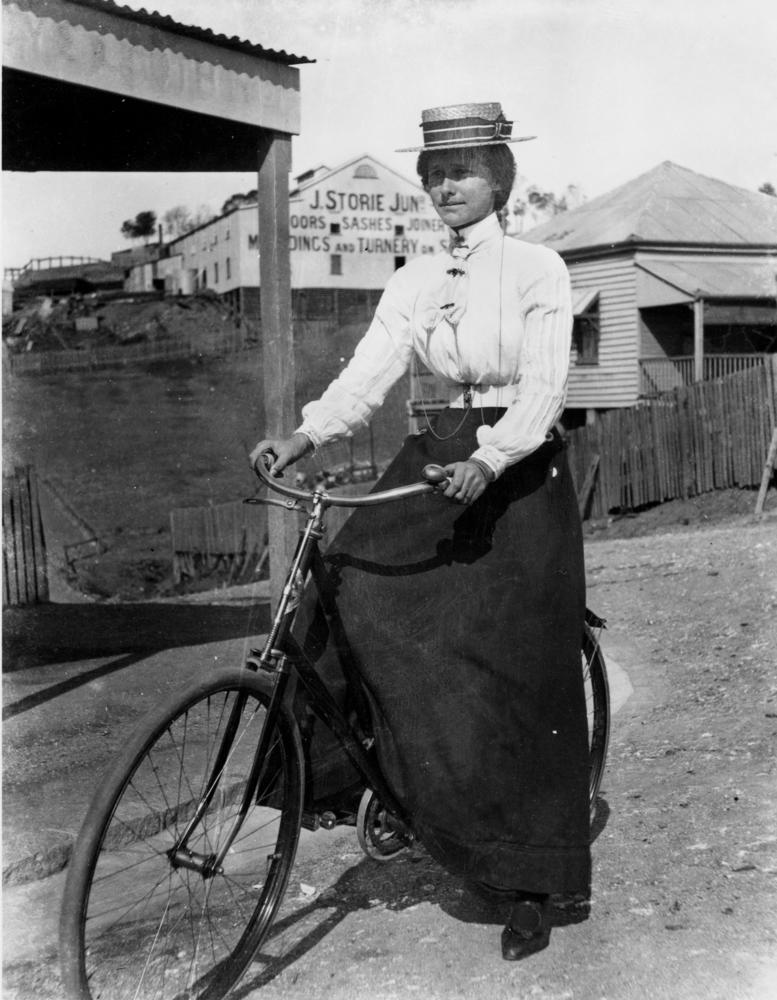
Woman cycling in Brisbane, 1890–1900

Women's cycling was controversial during the 1890s in Australia. The issue was discussed in several periodicals of the era including the Bulletin. There was a question of whether women should be allowed to ride bicycles in the first place, an issue settled in 1895 of yes. There was a question of the appropriate clothing to wear while riding a bicycle, if women should be allowed to compete in bicycle races, the most appropriate style of bicycle riding for women, if bicycle riding was good for a woman's health, and if the sport was appropriate for women to participate because of the possibility of making women more manly. Bicycle shops, such as Massey-Harris Bicycles of Brisbane, Rockhampton and Charters Towers, were catering to female customers by 1896. Malvern Star was also featuring female cyclists on the cover of their cycling catalogs during the same period. During the 1890s, cycling's popularity increased because it served several purposes, including transportation and recreation. It made parts of Australia more accessible to women than they had previously been.

In 1922, a committee in Australia investigated the benefits of physical education for girls. They came up with several recommendations regarding what sports were and were not appropriate for girls to play based on the level of fitness required. It was considered "medically appropriate" for all girls to be able to participate in, so long as they were not done in an overly competitive manner, swimming, rowing, cycling and horseback riding.

During the 1920s and 1930s, the media gave very little attention to women who set endurance records. Instead the media chose to focus on male cyclists. During this period, Australian women were setting records. Edna Sayers tackled the Goulburn to Sydney course on the same day as the men, setting off half an hour prior to the male professionals, lowering the women's record to 7 hours 41 minutes and 5 seconds in 1933, and to 6 hours 11 minutes and 30 seconds in 1935. In 1937, Joyce Barry rode from Newcastle, New South Wales to Sydney, a distance of 160 kilometres (99 mi) in six and a half hours. in September 1938 Barry established the women's seven-day day record of 1,107 miles (1,782 km). Valda Unthank set several records in the same era, including a 1938 distance record for her ride from Adelaide, South Australia to Melbourne. Unthank broke Barry's seven-day record by riding 1,438.5 miles (2,315.0 km).

Australian women's sports had an advantage over many other women's sport organisations around the world in the period after World War II. Women's sport organisations had largely remained intact and were holding competitions during the war period. This structure survived in the post-war period. Women's sport were not hurt because of food rationing, petrol rationing, population disbursement, and other issues facing post-war Europe. When international sport resumed in the post-war period, Australian women were at an advantage as a result.
