= Centenary 1000 =

1934 Australian road bicycle race

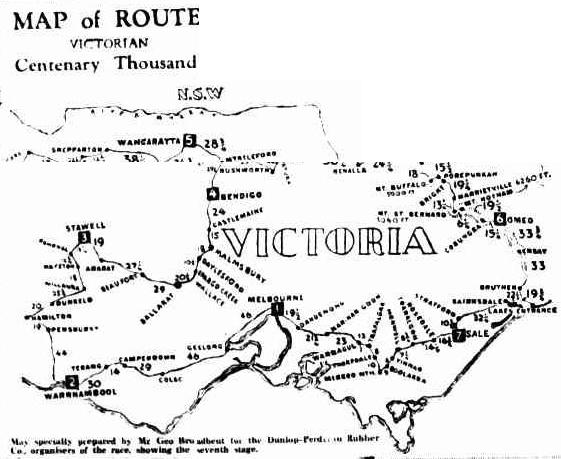
- Map of the route

Race details
- Date: 20–27 October 1934
- Country: Australia
- Region: Victoria
- Type: Seven-day stage race
- Distance: 1,102 miles (1,773 km)

Winners
- Handicap: Ted Stubenrauch, Vic
- Championship: Harry Cruise, Vic

The Centenary 1000 cycling race was a one-week road bicycle race over seven stages covering 1,102 miles (1,773 km). The race was run in 1934 as part of the celebrations of the Centenary of Victoria. The race was originally conceived along the lines of the Dunlop Grand Prix, won by Hubert Opperman then aged 23, by 1h 20' and the concept for the race was covering 1,000 miles (1,600 km) with prizes exceeding £1,000, including a climb over Mount Hotham.

The race attracted the top riders from Australia and New Zealand as well as Frenchmen Paul Chocque and Fernand Mithouard and Italian Nino Borsari. (Note: Borsari was a member of the Italian gold medal winning team pursuit at the 1932 Summer Olympics while Chocque was a member of the French team that won silver in the same event.) The Australian riders included Opperman, Richard "Fatty" Lamb, Ossie Nicholson, Hefty Stuart, Ern Milliken, Horrie Marshall and Ken Ross. Also competing were riders who would come to prominence in the following years, including Alan Angus, Dean Toseland, Clinton Beasley and Bill Moritz. The only notable Australian absentee was Frankie Thomas who had been suspended for 18 months. Nicholson had been suspended for 12 months for interfering with a rider making a record attempt but was able to have the suspension lifted in time to ride.. Efforts were made to also have Thomas’ suspension lifted, but to no avail. The New Zealand riders were Harry Watson, who had finished 2nd in the 1927 Dunlop Grand Prix, Len Hill and Alby Ralston. (Note: Alby Ralston was the nephew of Andrew Ralston who set the fastest time in the Warrnambool in 1901.)

The championship title was won by Harry Cruise then aged 28, in 53 hours 50 minutes 32 seconds. As Mithouard did not finish stage 6, Cruise had a 3 minute margin going into the final stage and was able to maintain that margin, becoming the Australasian Road Champion. The handicap was won by D grade rider Ted Stubenrauch despite splintering a bone in his shoulder on stage 4.

== Handicaps ==
The major races in Australia at the time were conducted as handicap races, including the Warrnambool to Melbourne and Goulburn to Sydney. There was a push for the race to be run on “continental lines", that is as a scratch race. The organisers however expressed concern that only a small number of riders could win in a scratch race and that the Sydney to Melbourne championship race had been ridden at a low speed of 15.7 mph (25.3 km/h), "was a contest of tactics, not of speed and endurance" and that there was "loafing by the whole field of riders over many miles" of the final stage. The compromise was a graded handicap, with 30 riders graded on scratch and similar numbers in each of the other grades. By way of comparison the handicaps for the 1933 Warrnambool to Melbourne had 21 handicaps of between 10 and 70 minutes. The championship title was decided on aggregate time with bonus time deductions on each stage of 1' 30" for the fastest, 1' 00" for the second fastest and 0' 30" for the third fastest. The handicap title was to be determined by a complex point system, with 130 points for first through to 30 for 100th for most stages and the fifth stage to Omeo had an extra 20 points. The grade handicaps varied slightly from stage to stage as follows:

Grade Handicaps
Stage	Route	Distance	A	B	C	D
1	Melbourne – Warrnambool	165 miles (266 km)	Scr	20 min	30 min	40 min
2	Warrnambool – Stawell	152 miles (245 km)	Scr	19 min	29 min	39 min
3	Stawell – Bendigo	163 miles (262 km)	Scr	22 min	32 min	43 min
4	Bendigo - Wangaratta	156 miles (251 km)	Scr	20 min	27 min	37 min
5	Wangaratta - Omeo	154 miles (248 km)	Scr	26 min	36 min	48 min
6	Omeo - Sale	152 miles (245 km)	Scr	18 min	27 min	38 min
6 alt.	Mount Buffalo - Sale	216 miles (348 km)	Scr	43 min	?? min	72 min
7	Sale - Melbourne	158 miles (254 km)	Scr	22 min	26 min	43 min

== Prizes ==
When the event was announced in April 1934, it was promoted as having prizes over £1,000. The prizes grew steadily as the date approached. Ultimately there was £820 for the Handicap, £635 for the Championship The winner of the handicap and the championship each won £500 but the major difference between the two was that the handicap had prizes of £150 for 2nd down to £25 for 5th, while the championship only had a prize of £30 for 2nd and none for the lower places. (Note: It may seem odd in the 21st century that the major prizes were not awarded to the fastest riders in the event. At the time however handicap races were well entrenched in Australia with the major races all being handicaps. The Goulburn to Sydney was predominately run as a handicap, with only a handful of scratch races prior to 1994, while the Melbourne to Warrnambool was a handicap event until 1996. For the fastest rider received a similar prize to the handicap winner was unusual, a situation which persisted long after 1934, with the fastest time in the 1951 Tour of Gippsland winning just £16 compared to the £70 for the handicap winner.) There were small prizes for each stage together with prizes for town sprints. The scratch riders were even less likely to beat the handicap to win the town sprints. The richest stage was the mountainous fifth, with a pool of £140 on offer for the ride from Wangaratta to Omeo which included the climbs of Mount Buffalo, Mount St Bernard and Hotham Heights.

One condition of the race was that cycle traders were prohibited from offering a bonus or other inducement to competitors in the event of winning the race on his machine. It is not clear what this condition was meant to achieve and it did not stop cycle traders advertising the success of riders on their bicycles.

The size of the championship prize was at the instigation of Sidney Myer who gave a gold cup valued at 100 guineas to go with the £500 provided by the Centenary Council. Myer also donated £500 for the handicap winner.

== Stages ==
=== Stage 1: Melbourne – Warrnambool ===
Stage 1 on Saturday 20 October 1934 was a fresh take on the traditional Warrnambool route of 165 miles (266 km) being run in reverse direction from Melbourne to Warrnambool for only the second time. 107 riders started the race and all of them made it through to Warrnambool. Mithouard and Chocque both punctured, the later twice and Chocque was then involved in a collision before coming into Camperdown wrecking his bicycle which was replaced. Borsari had a slipping chain near Little River but recovered to rejoin the A grade bunch, however Opperman's account of the stage was that the A grade riders rolled into Colac as a compact bunch, however they were sent away in straggling sections and without Borsari. Borsari again recovered and despite cramp in the legs he and Mithouard led into the Showgrounds at Warrnambool. Opperman states that publicity had been given to the finish of three laps on the track at Warrnambool only to find that the finish was half a lap after the entrance. The previous fastest time for this direction was 12h 53' 0" set by Jim Carpenter in 1895. This time was comfortably beaten, with the first riders completing the course in 6h 50' 35" and Horrie Marshall setting the fastest time of 6h 38' 05".

Stage 1 result
	Championship	Time	Bonification	Handicap	Grade
1	Horrie Marshall, WA	6h 39' 35"	1' 30"	Ted Stubenrauch, Vic	D
2	Hefty Stuart, Vic	s.t.	1' 00"	SV Andrews, Vic	D
3	Hubert Opperman, Vic	s.t.	0' 30"	Jimmy Duffy, Vic	D
4	"Speed" Morgan, NSW	s.t.		Tommy Lawn, Vic	D
5	Harry Cruise, Vic	s.t.		Jack Beasley, Vic	D
6	Harry Woolrich, Vic	s.t.		CW Oram, Vic	D

=== Stage 2: Warrnambool – Stawell ===
There was no race on Sunday with stage 2 on Monday 22 October 1934 covering a distance of 152.25 miles (245.02 km). Just 8 of the 30 A Grade riders were together at the finish. In addition to punctures, there was a crash at a railway crossing a few miles from Penshurst involving Nicholson, Joe Buckley and Bill Brewer. Buckley broke his collar bone and had to abandon while Nicholson suffered a severe head injury, completing the stage despite suffering from concussion, but abandoning the race at Stawell. In the handicap race, Toseland and Hallett had a lead of 5 minutes of the rest of their group, with Toseland winning easily, well ahead of the A grade riders.

Stage 2 result
	Championship	Time	Handicap	Grade
1	Hefty Stuart, Vic	7h 55' 10"	Dean Toseland, SA	C
2	Harry Watson (NZ)	+30"	AL Hallett, Vic	C
3	Norm Lloyd, Vic	+1' 00"	Ted Stubenrauch, Vic	D
4	Hubert Opperman, Vic	+1' 30"	Jimmy Duffy, Vic	D
5	Ern Milliken, Vic	+1' 30"	V Williamson, Vic	C
6	Alan Angus, Vic	+1' 30"	T Murrihy, Vic	C

Standings after stage 2
	Championship	Time	Handicap	Grade	Points
1	Hefty Stuart, Vic	14h 32' 15"	Ted Stubenrauch, Vic	D	240
2	Harry Watson (NZ)	+1' 30"	Dean Toseland, SA	C	231
3	Hubert Opperman, Vic	+2' 00"	SV Andrews, Vic	D	211
4	Harry Cruise, Vic	+2' 30"	Jimmy Duffy, Vic	D	210
5	Ern Milliken, Vic	+2' 30"	Tommy Lawn, Vic	D	195
6	Fernand Mithouard (FRA)	+2' 30"	V Williamson, Vic	C	188

=== Stage 3: Stawell – Bendigo ===
Stage 3 was held on Tuesday 23 October 1934, covering 163 miles (262 km). Given the strength of C and D Grade, their handicaps for this stage were reduced by 3 minutes. Chocque was in the lead at the Ballarat sprint when he was struck, causing him to crash, breaking his collarbone, forcing him to abandon. Despite the reduced handicap the C and D group were well in front, with J Savage finishing not only first, but also fastest, nearly 2 minutes up on A Grade. Stuart slipped his chain just a few miles from the finish, but managed to regain the group and won the sprint by inches.

Stage 3 result
	Championship	Time	Handicap	Grade
1	Hefty Stuart, Vic	8h 28' 05"	J Savage, Vic	C
2	Nino Borsari (ITA)	+ 30"	R W Roberts, Vic	C
3	Pat Veitch, Vic	+1' 00"	C Cain, Vic	C
4	Fernand Mithouard (FRA)	+1' 30"	C Delaney, Vic	C
5	Ern Milliken, Vic	+1' 30"	T Murrihy, Vic	C
6	Hubert Opperman, Vic	+1' 30"	Alan Oram, Vic	C

Standings after stage 3
	Championship	Time	Handicap	Grade	Points
1	Hefty Stuart, Vic	22h 58' 50"	Ted Stubenrauch, Vic	D	336
2	Harry Watson (NZ)	+2' 00"	Dean Toseland, SA	C	310
3	Hubert Opperman, Vic	+3' 30"	J Savage	C	310
4	Ern Milliken, Vic	+4' 00"	Jimmy Duffy, Vic	D	297
5	Harry Cruise, Vic	+4' 00"	R W Roberts	C	272
6	Fernand Mithouard (FRA)	+4' 00"	C Cain	C	268

=== Stage 4: Bendigo - Wangaratta ===
Stage 4 on Wednesday 24 October 1934 covered 156.75 miles (252.26 km) was the first time in which an A Grade rider beat the handicap to finish first. The original 107 riders were down to 91 at the start, with 9 riders having dropped out overnight. The Argus described it as the perfect handicap with riders from each of the grades in the 29 riders at the finish for the 2 lap sprint around Wangaratta showgrounds. Stuart, who had been leading the championship, broke a pedal and lost more than half an hour. Mithouard won the stage and with Stuart out of contention, took the lead in the championship. It was a tough day for leaders as the handicap leader Stubenrauch broke his rear wheel in a fall at Benalla and had to wait over an hour for a replacement. Stubenrauch splintered a bone in his right shoulder, but was somehow able to continue the race.

Stage 4 result
	Championship	Time	Handicap	Grade
1	Fernand Mithouard (FRA)	8h 2' 10"	Fernand Mithouard (FRA)	A
2	Pat Veitch, Vic	+30"	Pat Veitch, Vic	A
3	Harry Cruise, Vic	+1' 00"	Harry Cruise, Vic	A
4	Bob Amott, Vic	+1' 30"	Jimmy Wearne, Qld	B
5	Hubert Opperman, Vic	+1' 30"	Bob Amott, Vic	A
6	Ern Milliken, Vic	+1' 30"	Dean Toseland, SA	C

Standings after stage 4
	Championship	Time	Handicap	Grade	Points
1	Fernand Mithouard (FRA)	31h 03' 30"	Dean Toseland, SA	C	408
2	Harry Cruise, Vic	+1' 00"	Jimmy Duffy, Vic	D	392
3	Hubert Opperman, Vic	+1' 00"	J Savage, Vic	C	389
4	Ern Milliken, Vic	+1' 30"	Ted Stubenrauch, Vic	D	386
5	Harry Watson (NZ)	+12' 10"	A L Hallett, Vic	C	368
6	Bob Amott, Vic	+19' 00"			

=== Stage 5: Wangaratta - Omeo ===
The mountainous 5th stage on Thursday 25 October 1934 had been anticipated as the key stage of the race, covering 154 miles (248 km) and including the climbs of Mount Buffalo, Mt St Bernard and Hotham Heights. The stage however was interrupted with a torrential downpours of rain hail and sleet and the race was suspended at Mount Buffalo, after covering around 90 miles (140 km). The riders were accommodated at the Mount Buffalo Chalet as they were effectively marooned, with the road to Wangaratta under 3 feet (0.91 m) of water, the Great Alpine Road over Mountt St Bernard was impassable and 2 inches (5.1 cm) of snow fell at Mt Hotham. Milliken suffered a puncture on Mount Buffalo and had to wait more than an hour for a spare wheel. It was reported that he was almost frozen and he abandoned the race.

The ride from Wangaratta to Mount Buffalo was not counted in either the championship or the handicap events so the overall standings remained as per Stage 4. (Note: The time credited to Harry Cruise of the race of 53h 50' 32" is the sum of his times for stages 1-4 and 6-7. Similarly Ted Stubenrauch had 386 points after stage 4. He was the third up Mount Buffalo and 2nd in stage 6, gaining 120 points. His total after stage 6 was 506 points.)

The Sporting Globe listed the times for the Mount Buffalo hill climb and reported that the time for the A Grade riders were affected by the storm becoming more severe by the time they reached the climb.

Mt Buffalo hill climb
	Rider	Grade	Time
1	Dean Toseland, SA	C	1h 11' 32"
2	R W Roberts	C	+ 0' 03"
3	Bill Moritz, SA	B	+ 0' 25"
4	Harry Watson (NZ)	A	+ 0' 43"
5	Harry Cruise, Vic	A	+ 1' 03"
6	Fernand Mithouard (FRA)	A	+ 1' 07"
7	Hubert Opperman, Vic	A	+ 1' 11"
8	Harry Woolrich, Vic	A	+ 1' 12"
9	K L Webb, Vic	B	+ 1' 14"
10	J Finn	C	+ 1' 17"

=== Omeo - Sale ===
Stage 6 on Friday 26 October 1934 was meant to be a 152 miles (245 km) ride from Omeo to Sale, however as the riders had been unable to leave Mount Buffalo, at 10:15pm that night the organisers decided that the following stage would be from Mount Buffalo to Sale, a distance of 216 miles (348 km). The revised stage included what the Argus described as the most arduous climb ever attempted in Australia being the climbs of Mt St Bernard and Hotham Heights as well as the increased distance of the stage, covering 216 miles (348 km). Stuart did not start the stage. The stage was marred by numerous falls and punctures, which started on the descent from Mount Buffalo. Opperman's account of the stage included that "On the morning we left the Chalet the instructions to the riders were changed four times in half an hour. At first we were to be controlled down the hill, then the field were to be allowed to use their own discretion, and race down, and these instructions were cancelled and altered until no one felt sure exactly what was the case."

Of the roads, Mithouard said "The climbs over Mt. Hotham were not very severe, but the condition of the road, washed into a rutted surface with sharp- edged stones forming knife-like obstructions for several miles, was too bad to expect men and bicycles to race over. The heavy rains and storms damaged the roads to such an extent that it was almost impossible to ride them without mishap". Mithouard had punctures and falls, one of which injured his leg, broke a wheel and spent 15 minutes waiting for a replacement. At Omeo Mithouard was tired and distressed and his bike needed repair and he withdrew.

In addition to Mithouard there were numerous falls, including Jack Beasley, who fell into a flooded creek and had to be saved from drowning by another rider, Harry Woolrich and the New Zealander Len Hill had severe falls with Woolrich being put into the hospice at Hotham Heights, Borsari cut his hand and Opperman also cut his hand requiring stitches, which he refused until after the stage. The trio of Opperman, Angus and Morgan battled on to Sale, losing 27 minutes on the stage to Lamb.

Over a long and arduous stage Bert Williams won by 18 minutes and was the only rider to finish in daylight.

Stage 6 result Mt Buffalo – Sale
	Championship	Time	Handicap	Grade
1	Richard Lamb	13h 01' 50"	Bert Williams, Vic	B
2	Nino Borsari (ITA)		Ted Stubenrauch, Vic	D
3	Bob Amott, Vic		Richard Lamb	A
4	Harry Cruise, Vic		Nino Borsari (ITA)	A
5	Harry Watson (NZ)		Bob Amott, Vic	A
6	Bert Williams, Vic		Jimmy Wearne, Qld	B

Standings after stage 6
	Championship	Time	Handicap	Grade	Points
1	Harry Cruise, Vic	44h 07' 00"	Ted Stubenrauch, Vic	D	506
2	Harry Watson (NZ)	+3' 10"	Dean Toseland, Vic	C	500
3	Richard Lamb, Vic	+16' 45"	Jimmy Duffy, Vic	D	472
4	Bob Amott, Vic	+17' 40"	A L Hallett	C	458
5	Nino Borsari (ITA)	+29' 15"	Bert Williams, Vic	C	453
6	Alan Angus, Vic	+48' 29"	J Savage	C	439

The Sporting Globe again set out the times of each rider up the Mt St Bernard climb. Further there were valuable prizes on offer for the Alpine stage, which as it was not run in the intended manner had to be redistributed. While Omeo was no longer the end of a stage, the prizes were awarded to the riders as they entered the compulsory stop at Omeo.

Mt St Bernard hill climb
	Rider	Grade	Time
1	Hubert Opperman, Vic	A	1h 12' 11"
2	Bob Amott, Vic	A	+ 0' 05"
3	Harry Watson (NZ)	A	+ 0' 05"
4	Harry Cruise, Vic	A	+ 0' 05"
5	Fernand Mithouard (FRA)	A	+ 0' 18"
6	Harry Woolrich, Vic	A	+ 0' 35"

Mt Buffalo to Omeo
	Championship	Time
1	Nino Borsari (ITA)	
2	Harry Cruise, Vic	
3	Bob Amott, Vic	
4	Richard Lamb	
5	Harry Watson (NZ)	
6	Fernand Mithouard (FRA)	

=== Stage 7: Sale - Melbourne ===
After the difficulties of the previous two days, the final stage on Saturday 27 October 1934 158.75 miles (255.48 km) Opperman had injured his knee in a fall in stage 4 near Wangaratta and injured it again in a fall whilst descending from Mount Hotham. He attempted to finish the race, but was forced to abandon at Traralgon, said to be the first time Oppy had retired from a race.

In the handicap, there were just six points separating Stubenrauch and Toseland, pointing to an exciting finish. At Berwick Toseland lost a pin from his chain, lost contact with the bunch and lost his chance at the £500. For the second time in the race C Grade set the fastest time of the race, with Howden leading the bunch. Stubenrauch finished with the bunch to win the handicap, while Duffy's second place was enough to see him snatch 2nd in the handicap from Toseland. Toseland had an impressive race in that, riding from C grade, he finished 9th in the championship, beating all of the B grade riders.

In the championship Cruise had a few minutes lead over Watson and stayed in the safety of the bunch, keeping out of trouble in the sprint around Como Park.

One indication of how hard the race was can be found in ride of Alan Angus. On stage 6 he finished with Opperman, losing some 27 minutes to Lamb. That was still enough however for Angus to finish in 6th place in the championship.

Stage 7 result
	Championship	Time	Handicap	Grade
1	"Speed" Morgan, NSW		Stan Howden, Vic	C
2	Pat Veitch, Vic	+0' 30"	Jimmy Duffy, Vic	D
3	Nino Borsari (ITA)	+1' 00"	H Simpson, Vic	C
4			A L Hallett, Vic	C
5			C Cain, Vic	C
6			Esmond Williamson, NSW	C

Final Standings
	Championship	Time	Handicap	Grade	Points
1	Harry Cruise, Vic	53h 50' 32"	Ted Stubenrauch, Vic	D	611
2	Harry Watson (NZ)	+3' 10"	Jimmy Duffy, Vic	D	592
3	Richard Lamb	+16' 45"	Dean Toseland, SA	C	588
4	Bob Amott	+17' 40"	A L Hallett, Vic	C	558
5	Nino Borsari (ITA)	+28' 45"	Stan Howden, Vic	C	537
6	Alan Angus	+39' 01"	H Simpson, Vic	C	534

Complete Final Results (1–61)
Rider	Grade	Championship		Handicap	
Rider	Grade	Pos	Time	Pos	Points
Harry Cruise, Vic	A	1	53h 50' 33"	22	439
Harry Watson (NZ)	A	2	54h 02' 42"	34	410
Richard Lamb, Vic	A	3	54h 07' 20"	36	394
Bob Amott, Vic	A	4	54h 08' 14"	33	414
Nino Borsari (ITA)	A	5	54h 19' 07"	39	389
Alan Angus, Vic	A	6	54h 39' 12"	35	398
Pat Veitch, Vic	A	7	55h 20' 07"	29	420
L J Edgell, Vic	A	8	55h 22' 53"	44	371
Dean Toseland, SA	C	9	55h 23' 39"	3	585
Hallet Hallet, Vic	C	10	55h 26' 31"	4	558
Bert Williams, Vic	D	11	55h 27' 59"	7	520
E H Simpson, Vic	C	12	55h 45' 39"	6	534
Norm Lloyd, Vic	A	13	55h 51' 46"	45	371
K L Webb, Tas	B	14	55h 55' 55"	16	457
Jimmy Wearne, Qld	B	15	55h 58' 10"	13	484
A L Mansell, Vic	B	16	56h 08' 13"	17	455
"Speed" Morgan, NSW	B	17	56h 08' 57"	50	350
Ted Waterford, Vic	B	18	56h 22' 45"	15	462
Stan Howden, Vic	C	19	56h 24' 14"	5	542
Alby Ralston (NZ)	B	20	56h 29' 33"	52	334
A G Christie, Vic	B	21	56h 31' 26"	19	449
R W Roberts, Vic	C	22	56h 43' 09"	11	493
J W Finn, Vic	C	23	56h 46' 48"	14	473
George Bristow, Vic	B	24	56h 47' 26"	21	440
Cyril Dungey, Vic	B	25	56h 49' 10"	31	418
Roy Johnson, Vic	B	26	57h 09' 55"	30	419
V E Williamson, Vic	C	27	57h 14' 14"	10	500
C A Cain, Vic	C	28	57h 25' 14"	8	515
Ted Stubenrauch, Vic	D	29	57h 33' 10"	1	601
C A Delaney, Vic	D	30	57h 37' 15"	12	488
T P Murriphy, Vic	C	31	57h 44' 37"	28	424
Jimmy Duffy, Vic	C	32	57h 51' 09"	2	592
Horrie Marshall, WA	A	33	58h 1' 3"	57	315
A J Middleton, Vic	B	34	58h 29' 38"	43	377
W L Johnston, WA	A	35	58h 24' 44"	51	339
J W Savage, Vic	C	36	58h 31' 22"	9	514
Roy Anderson, Vic	D	37	58h 31' 56"	20	446
Bill Moritz, SA	B	38	58h 41' 30"	41	383
C A Oram, Vic	D	39	58h 58' 29"	23	436
Stan Backhouse, Vic	C	40	59h 00' 04"	42	378
M F Fergusson, SA	C	41	59h 08' 46"	37	393
J M Sharman, Vic	C	42	59h 09' 25"	26	429
F H Maher, NSW	C	43	59h 15' 37"	55	325
Esmond Williamson, NSW	C	44	59h 29' 21"	27	428
J H Reed, Vic	D	45	59h 47' 50"	46	370
Jack Royle, Tas	B	46	59h 52' 51"	48	351
B Goldsworthy, Vic	D	47	60h 0' 26"	25	432
R Woolston, SA	A	48	60h 18' 37"	53	331
Jack Beasley, Vic	D	49	60h 25' 45"	24	434
H D Cresswell, NSW	A	50	60h 30' 20"	49	351
F Shea, Vic	D	51	60h 36' 00"	18	455
G M Haupt, SA	B	52	60h 43' 00"	54	327
A D Hills, Vic	D	53	61h 48' 31"	38	390
S V Andrews, Vic	D	54	61h 59' 30"	32	414
J Stratford, SA	C	55	62h 03' 45"	47	354
C J Kohn, Vic	D	56	62h 55' 45"	56	317
Laurie Jones, Vic	D	57	63h 23' 30"	40	388
J C Fisher, Vic	D	58	63h 43' 24"	58	311
Ken Cross, Vic	D	59	66h 38' 07"	59	302
T Hibbert, Vic	D	60	68h 42' 05"	60	292
Jack Stanhope, Vic	D	61	76h 01' 58"	61	289
