= Hefty Stuart =

Australian cyclist (1912–1938)

Walter F Stuart
- Stuart in 1935

Personal information
- Nicknames: Hefty, Wonthaggi Wonder
- Born: c. 1912 Warburton, Victoria, Australia
- Died: 9 December 1938 (aged 26) Melbourne, Victoria, Australia
- Height: 5 ft 10 in (178 cm)
- Weight: 11 st 10 lb (74 kg)

Cycling career
- Sport: Cycling
- Discipline: Road

Professional team
- 1929–1938: Malvern Star

Major wins
- 1933 Australian National road race champion

Walter "Hefty" Stuart (1912–1938) was an Australian cyclist who competed on both road and track, as was typical of Australian cyclists of the era such as Hubert Opperman and Richard Lamb.

== Career highlights ==
1932
6th Brisbane Six Day
1933
2nd fastest Goulburn to Sydney
Fastest Tour of Gippsland
1st Australian national road race title and Blue Riband in the Warrnambool to Melbourne Classic
1st Stage 3 Tour of Tasmania
2nd Stage 4 Tour of Tasmania
7th General Classification Tour of Tasmania
1934
Fastest Tour of Gippsland
Centenary 1000

2nd fastest Stage 1
Fastest stage 2
1st A Grade stage 3

1935
Solo record for London-Portsmouth-London
Tandem record for London-Portsmouth-London
Tandem record for London-Bath-London
Tandem record for London-Brighton-London
Tandem record for London to York
Tandem record for 12 hours
1936
Won the entire track programme at Nyah
1st Circuit of Albany
1st Albany Grand Prix

=== Professional career ===
Stuart grew up in Gippsland and won the Gippsland track championships in 1930 and 1931. Stuart's first cycling coach was Alf Bishop and the Les Jabara. In the 1930 Tour of Gippsland Stuart, aged 18, had a handicap of 20 minutes over seasoned riders Opperman, Lamb, Frankie Thomas and Ossie Nicholson. By 1933 Stuart was riding from scratch and set the fastest time in the 140 miles (230 km) Tour of Gippsland in a course record. Bob Amott and Stuart were accused of doping and samples were taken from their bidons at the start of the 1934 tour of Gippsland.. Stuart went on to set the fastest time in the 140 miles (230 km) race. Analysis later confirmed the contents were water, rum and caffeine.

In 1932 Stuart teamed with Nicholson in the Brisbane six day race. Nicholson was injured and they were only able to finish sixth.

Stuart first rode in the Warrnambool to Melbourne Classic in 1929 at the age of 17, with a handicap of 38 minutes where he finished 33rd. By 1931 his handicap had come down to 16 minutes. He went on in 1933 to win the Blue Riband for the fastest time which carried with it the Australian national road race title.

1933 was a stellar year for Stuart, as well as winning the Warrnambool and the Tour of Gippsland he was 2nd fastest time in Goulburn to Sydney, behind Frankie Thomas, and won stage 3 of the Tour of Tasmania. The Tour of Tasmania was a six-day stage race covering 566 miles (911 km). Stuart was second in stage 4 and finished 7th overall, with the race being won by Lamb.

1934 was another great year for Stuart, who started in 14 events and made the fastest time in 10 of them including the Tour of Gippsland. The biggest race of 1934 was the Centenary 1000, a 6-stage race over 1,052 miles (1,693 km) to mark the Centenary of Victoria. Stuart was second fastest in Stage 1 from Melbourne to Warrnambool, fastest in stage 2 and was the fastest of the A Grade championship riders in stage 3. Stuart was leading the championship as a result of his wins however he broke a pedal on stage 4 and lost over 30 minutes. Stage 5 was marked by torrential downpours of rain hail and sleet as the riders climbed Mount Buffalo. Stuart fell on Mount Buffalo and did not start the sixth stage.

In 1935 Stuart was part of a team, led by Opperman and organised by Bruce Small, that travelled to England to attack various distance records. Other team members were Ern Milliken, Harold and Eddie Smith, Joe Walsh and New Zealand's Hubert Turtill. Stuart broke the 137 miles (220 km) London-Portsmouth-London solo record in 6hrs 34' 7". Riding with Milliken, they broke the tandem record in 6hrs 34' 7". Stuart and Milliken also broke the London-Brighton-London tandem record in 4hrs 9' 53", and the 196 miles (315 km) London to York in 8 hrs 15'. Stuart and Milliken carried on to ride 275 miles (443 km) to break the tandem 12-hour record. Stuart, Opperman and Milliken went to Belgium for the 1935 UCI Road World Championships, where Stuart finished 10th.

Stuart won every race at a track meeting at Nyah in January 1935, winning the mile and two mile handicaps from behind scratch, the three heat omnium, and the five mile scratch race. Stuart also won the Albany Grand Prix, a 62.5 miles (100.6 km) points race and the 31 miles (50 km) circuit of Albany.

Stuart continued to ride in 1936 but without notable success.

In 1937 Stuart, riding with Franz Duelberg who won the 100 kilometres (62 mi) teams championship at the Exhibition board track.

Stuart retired at the end of 1937 but was lured back to cycling at the end of 1938 to compete at the Exhibition board track. When competing in the final Stuart’s front tyre blew out, causing him to fall and he was run over by a following pacing motorcycle. Stuart died in hospital two weeks later.

== See also ==
- List of racing cyclists and pacemakers with a cycling-related death
