= Alan Angus =

Australian bicycle racer

Alan "Pete" Angus
Personal information
- Full name: Alan "Pete" Angus
- Nickname: "Pete"
- Born: April 1912 Burwood (Australia)
- Died: September 1988 (aged 76) Heidelberg (Australia)

Cycling career
- Sport: Cycling
- Discipline: ROAD / Track
- Role: Rider

Alan "Pete" Angus (1912–1988) was an Australian racing cyclist.

== Australian professional cycling career ==
The highlight of Angus's cycling career was twice winning the Australian national road race title, in 1936 and 1937, by winning the Blue Riband for the fastest time in the Warrnambool to Melbourne Classic. The popularity of the Warrnambool was such that the handicap for a rider is a measure of the cyclists standing at the time, with the scratch mark being referred to as the "mark of honour". Angus had a handicap of 36 minutes in 1930, where he finished 131st in a time of 10h 21' 25" and 31 minutes in 1931. From 1933 to the end of his career Angus was riding off scratch in the Warrnambool. In 1933 he could only finish 131st in a time of 7h 00' 00". In 1935 Angus lost 4 minutes due to a puncture and finished 140th. After winning in 1937 Angus announced that he intended to retire unless he was selected to ride in the Tour de France. As it transpired, neither eventuated however he didn't ride in the Warrnambool in 1938, missing several months of racing following an accident. In 1939 Angus was attempting to breakaway from his scratch markers when he pulled his foot out of the pedal strap, injured a tendon and was forced to slow down.

Angus tasted early success in 1930 finishing 3rd in the Holland 50, a 50 miles (80 km) race with a handicap of 13 minutes. In 1931 he followed this up with 3rd in the Melbourne to Bendigo race over 125 miles (201 km).

Angus was a regular rider in the arduous 140 miles (230 km) Tour of Gippsland. He had a handicap of 24 minutes in 1930 but was unplaced, seventh in 1931 on a handicap of 26.5 min, won in 1933 off a handicap of 14 minutes, 2nd fastest time in 1936 riding off scratch in 1936, 2nd fastest time again in 1937 and fastest time in 1939.

There was no Warrnambool in 1934 as the promoter, the Dunlop-Pedriau Rubber Co, had organised the Centenary 1000, a one-week race over seven stages covering 1,102 miles (1,773 km). Angus was one of the 30 "A Grade" riders starting from scratch. He rode strongly in a difficult race and while he didn't finish in the top 3 on any stage, his consistency saw him finish in 6th place. Finishing the race was an achievement in itself, with many top riders unable to do so, including Hubert Opperman, Ern Milliken, Hefty Stuart and Ossie Nicholson. The difficulties included a blizzard on the fifth stage, causing the stage to be interrupted overnight at Mt Buffalo.

Another race at which Angus performed well was the Barnet Glass Grand Prix. Angus was 4th in 1933 when the race was run from Melbourne to Ballarat and return, covering 125 miles (201 km). In 1934 he finished 2nd and fastest time over the new route of 165 miles (266 km) from Melbourne to Preston via Marysville, Buxton and Alexandra.

== End of career ==
Angus joined the Second Australian Imperial Force and was married on 16 March 1940 to Miss Alma Fraser prior to embarking for the war in Europe and the Middle East. Angus died in Heidelberg Repatriation Hospital on 20 September 1988.

== Career highlights ==
1930
3rd Holland 50
1931
3rd Melbourne to Bendigo
7th Tour of Gippsland
1933
1st Tour of Gippsland
4th Melbourne - Ballarat - Melbourne
1934
2nd and Fastest time Barnet Glass Grand Prix
6th Centenary 1000

1936
2nd Fastest time Tour of Gippsland
1st Australian national road race title and

Blue Riband in the Melbourne to Warrnambool Classic

1937
2nd Fastest time Barnet Glass Grand Prix
2nd Fastest time Tour of Gippsland
1st Australian national road race title and

Blue Riband in the Melbourne to Warrnambool Classic

1939
1st Australian 100-mile championship
1st and Fastest Midlands tour
Fastest time Tour of Gippsland
