= Ken Ross (cyclist) =

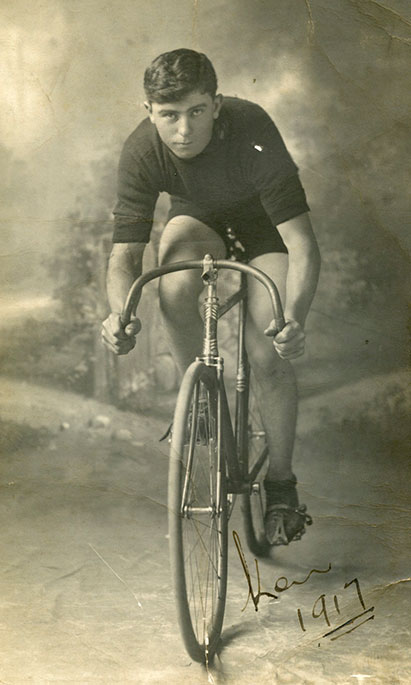
- Ken Ross, 1917

Personal information
- Full name: Kenneth Gordon Ross
- Born: 11 August 1900 Paterson, NSW
- Died: 1 March 1974 (aged 73) Gosford, NSW

Cycling career
- Sport: Cycling
- Discipline: Road / Track
- Role: Rider

Major wins
- 1st and fastest 1928 Goulburn to Sydney, fastest 1920 & 1926. 1st Sydney Six Days' Race 1922, 1925 and 1927

Kenneth Gordon Ross (1900–1974) was an Australian road and track cyclist. His best results were achieved in the Goulburn to Sydney, where he set the fastest time on three occasions and in the Sydney Six-day race which he won three times.

== Cycling career ==
Ross began cycling for the Parramatta club in 1917, winning the Parramatta championship that year. His first major success was finishing 2nd in the Goulburn to Sydney and setting the fastest time. He would subsequently set the fastest time in 1926 and 1928 including winning the handicap event in 1928. The 1928 Goulburn to Sydney was the first professional road race by Fatty Lamb who had set the fastest time in the previous three amateur events. Ross was 3rd fastest professional in 1930 and 4th in 1931.

Ross's success in the Goulburn to Sydney resulted in his selection for the Warrnambool to Melbourne, where the title of Long Distance Road Champion of Australasia was awarded to the fastest time over the full distance of 165 miles (266 km). However Ross' best result was the 3rd fastest time in 1930.

In 1927 Ross set the fastest time in the Bathurst to Sydney race in a new record of 7h 2' 5". Ross purchased an orchard in 1924 and this restricted his ability to train and to race. There were three big stage races in Australia during Ross's career. Ross was among the first riders selected for the Dunlop Grand Prix in 1927, but didn't start. In 1930 Ross was reported as having retired, however he continued to ride. He was selected for the Sydney to Sydney to Melbourne in 1930 but again did not start. In 1934 Ross was riding from his home in Gosford to Albury as training for the Centenary 1000 when he was hit by a car driver attempting to overtake him on the Hume Highway near Gundagai. Ross' claim for damages included £20 for his bicycle, £20 appearance money, £6 for wages paid while absent, £5 for train tare back home, and £45 for training expenses, as well as pain and suffering and for loss of prospective prize money. The jury awarded him £196. Ross retired shortly after the collision.

While best known as a road rider, Ross also had success in six-day racing. His first six-day race was in 1919 at Sydney where he was unplaced behind Willie Spencer and Charles Osterriter. In Europe in 1921 Ross competed in the Brussels six-day finishing 9th. In 1922 Ross teamed with Willie Spencer for the Berlin six-day. Spencer withdrew after 3 days and joined German rider Adolf Huschke. They were penalised a lap for the team change but were able to finish 4th. On his return to Australia, he won the Sydney six day with George Hammond, and went on to win the event twice more, in 1925 with George Dempsey and 1927 with Jack Fitzgerald

== Palmarès ==
1917
1st Parramatta championship
1919
unplaced Sydney Six day
1920
2nd and fastest Goulburn to Sydney
4th 24 hours race
1921
Tour de Paris
9th Brussels six-day
1922
4th Berlin six-day
1st Sydney six day race
1923
six-day race – Melbourne
1st Easter Wheel Race
1925
1st Sydney six day race
1926
2nd and fastest professional Goulburn to Sydney
1927
1st Sydney six day
1928
1st and fastest professional Goulburn to Sydney
1930
3rd fastest professional Goulburn to Sydney
3rd fastest professional Warrnambool to Melbourne
1931
4th fastest professional Goulburn to Sydney

== Recognition ==
- In 2025, he was inducted into the Cycling Australia Hall of Fame.
