= Jack Standen =

Australian cyclist

Personal information
- Born: 20 February 1909 Camperdown, New South Wales, Australia
- Died: 29 October 1973 (aged 64) Sydney, Australia

Cycling career
- Sport: Cycling

Jack Standen (20 February 1909 – 29 October 1973) track racing cyclist. Standen was educated at Waverley College He competed in the sprint event at the 1928 Summer Olympics.

== Amateur career ==
Standen had a promising start to his career in January 1927, winning the NSW Amateur titles over one mile and five miles. He entered the Australian Track Championships and Olympic tests at 18 years old, finishing first in every event he entered however he was disqualified in the Australian mile championship for interference with Dunc Gray. Standen and Gray were selected to represent Australia in track cycling at the 1928 Summer Olympics. No rider was sent for the road events, with Fatty Lamb being controversially overlooked, so Standen was entered for the road race, despite not competing in the Australian Olympic trial for that event. Standen however didn't start the road race. Standen won his preliminary round, but was beaten in the quarter finals.

Following the Olympics, Standen competed at the 1928 UCI Track Cycling World Championships in Budapest, Hungary where he won bronze in the amateur men's sprint.

== Professional career ==
In January 1929 Standen turned professional to compete at the newly constructed Canterbury Velodrome, a board track in Charles St Canterbury. As a part of his selection for the Olympics, Standen had entered into a bond to repay his travel costs of £360 if he turned professional within two years. Standen argued the bond should not be enforced as he was a minor at the time.. As he did not repay the bond, Standen was suspended by the UCI for the balance of the two years.

In 1932 Standen won the Brisbane Six Day with Fatty Lamb defeating a quality field including Frankie Thomas, Hubert Opperman and Jack Fitzgerald.
