= Robert Whetters =

Australian cyclist

Personal information
- Full name: Robert Whetters
- Born: 2 September 1939 (age 87) Australia

Cycling career
- Sport: Cycling
- Role: Rider

Robert Whetters (born 2 September 1939) is an Australian former racing cyclist. He won the Australian national road race title in 1969. He also competed in the individual road race and team pursuit events at the 1960 Summer Olympics.

Whetters won the professional Goulburn to Sydney Classic in 1973 run in reverse direction from Hoxton Park to Goulburn and twice set the fastest time in 1973 and in 1969 run in reverse direction from Milperra to Goulburn.
