= Cliff Burvill =

Australian cyclist (1937–2021)

Personal information
- Born: 26 March 1937 Coffs Harbour, New South Wales, Australia
- Died: 14 January 2021 (aged 83) Byron Bay, New South Wales, Australia

Cycling career
- Sport: Cycling

Cliff Burvill (26 March 1937 – 14 January 2021) was an Australian cyclist. He competed in the team pursuit event at the 1956 Summer Olympics. Burvill set the fastest time in the amateur Goulburn to Sydney Classic in 1958 run in reverse direction from Enfield to Goulburn.

Burvill died on 14 January 2021, after a fall at the criterium circuit in Byron Bay.
