= Ern Milliken =

Australian cyclist (1910–1992)

Ernest Milliken
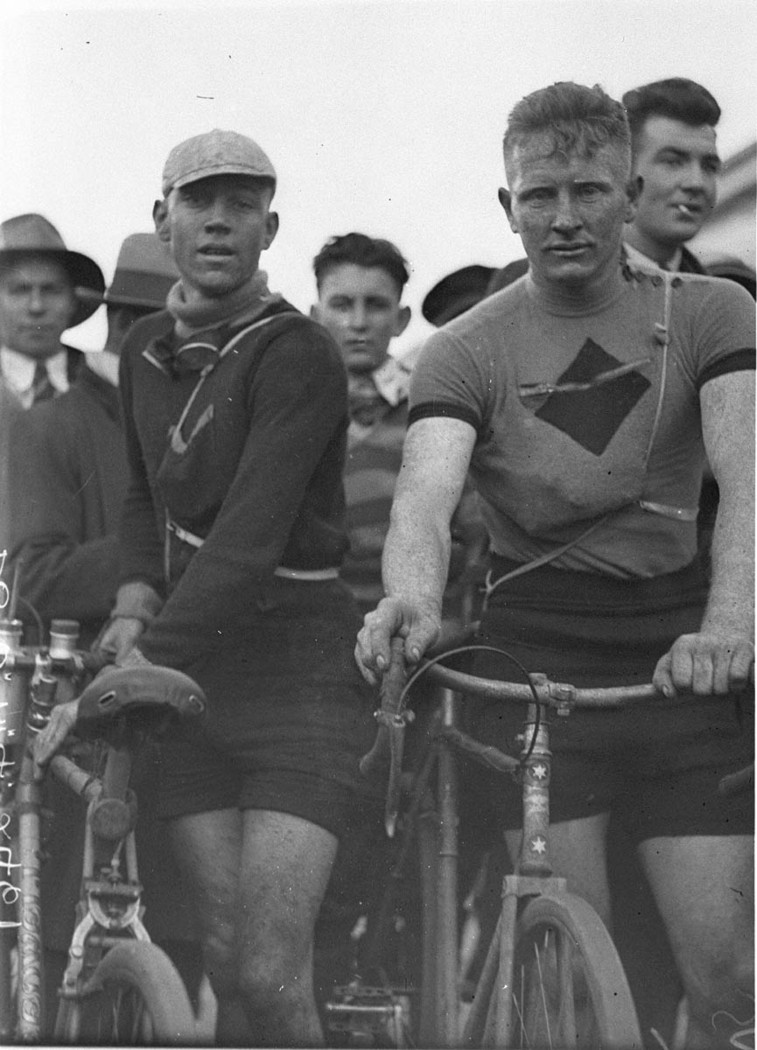

Personal information
- Full name: Ernest Francis Milliken
- Nicknames: Ern, Eagle of the Road
- Born: 14 November 1910 Brunswick, Victoria, Australia
- Died: 6 October 1992 (aged 81)

Cycling career
- Sport: Cycling
- Discipline: Road

Ernest Milliken (1910 – 1992) was an Australian Road racing cyclist who performed strongly in distance races and individual time trials.

== Career highlights ==
1931
Fastest Melbourne to Colac in world record time for 100 miles (160 km)
1st 20 miles (32 km) Victorian time trial
1932
1st 100 kilometres (62 mi) Australian championship time trial
1st and fastest Goulburn to Sydney in a new course record
Fastest in Melbourne to Colac breaking his own world record time for 100 miles (160 km)
1933
Record for Sydney to Newcastle in 5hrs 21' 27"
1st Melbourne to Castlemaine race
2nd Australian 100 kilometres (62 mi) time trial
1st the Victorian 100 kilometres (62 mi) time trial
Fastest Goulburn to Sydney
1st Melbourne to Wonthaggi time trial and Australian 100 miles (160 km) amateur champion, in record time.
Fastest in Melbourne to Colac
1934
World 25 mile competition record of 59' 6"
Fastest time in the 39 miles (63 km) Melbourne to Geelong in a new course record of 1hr 23' 55"
Victorian 100 kilometres (62 mi) time trial championship, setting Australian record
1st Melbourne to Castlemaine race
2nd Australian 100 kilometres (62 mi) time trial
2nd in Batman 1000
1935
Record for London-Brighton-London
Tandem record for London-Bath-London
Tandem record for London-Brighton-London
Tandem record for London-Portsmouth-London
Tandem record for London to York
Tandem record for 12 hours

== Amateur career ==
In his first year of racing, in 1931, Milliken won the 20 miles (32 km) Victorian road time trial, covering the distance in 53' 45". Milliken initially rode a Preston Star bicycle, but by 1932 he was riding a Malvern Star bicycle. and was coached by Bruce Small.

In 3 consecutive years, 1931, 1932 and 1933 Milliken set the fastest time in the Colac to Melbourne 100 miles (160 km) amateur road race, and in setting the fastest time, Milliken won the Victorian road championship title. His 1931 time of 3h 45' 54" was a course record, breaking the 1925 course record of A. L. Quinton (Vic.) of 4h 11' 47" and what was claimed to be the world 100 miles (160 km) competition record of Frank Hose of 3hr 46' 25" set in the 1931 Camperdown to Melbourne race.

Milliken broke his own record in 1932 with a time of 3hr 35' 15". All bicycle racing in that era was on fixed-gear bicycles and Milliken was reported to have ridden 92 gear inches. One of the first races to allow derailleur gears was the 1933 Melbourne to Castlemaine, promoted by Bruce Small Pty Ltd. The race was also notable for being a scratch Race, instead of the more usual handicap race races. Milliken won the race using a 3-speed derailleur made by the Cyclo Gear Company. Milliken won the Melbourne to Castlemaine again in 1934, knocking 40 minutes off the course record.

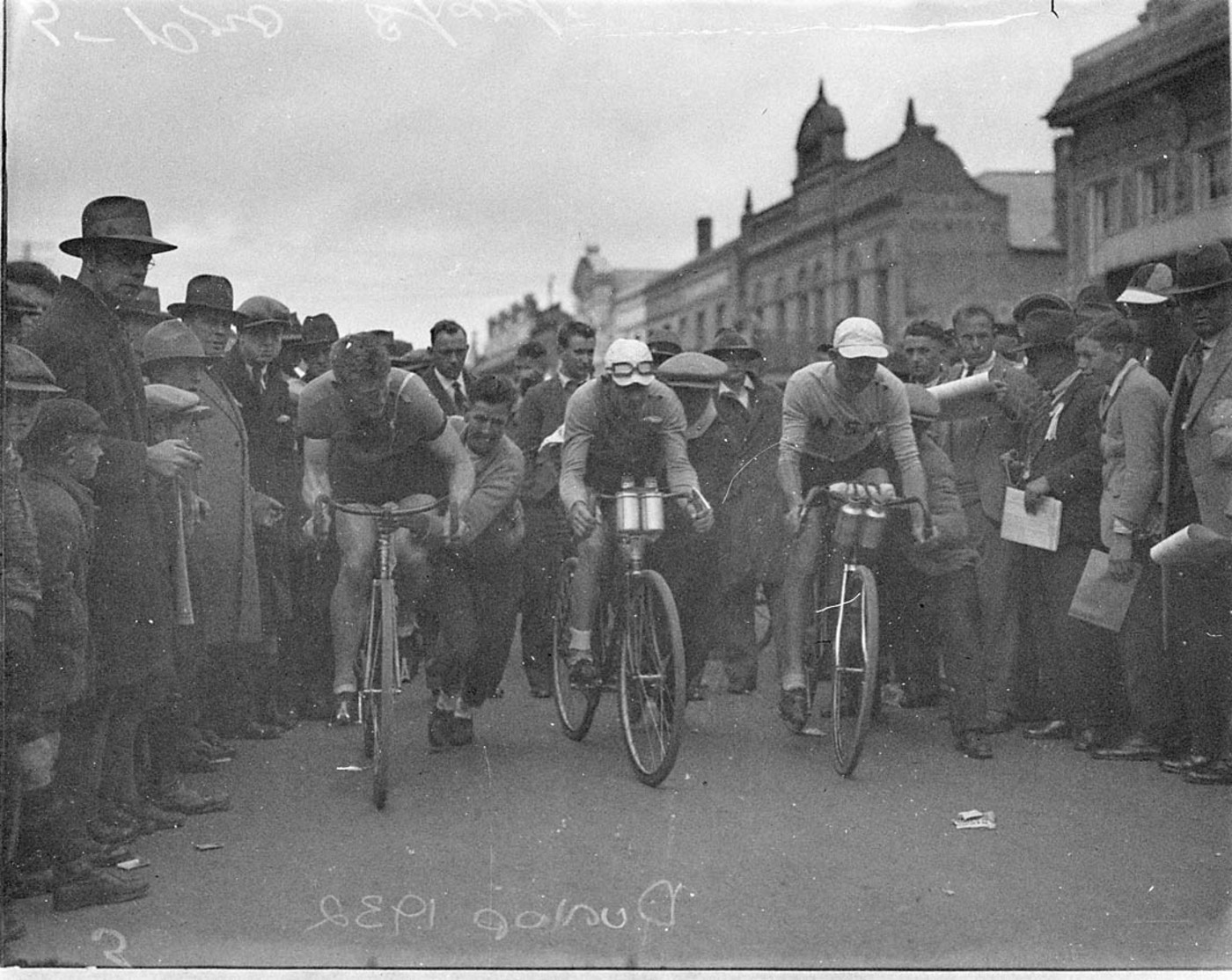
Start of the 1932 Goulburn to Sydney road race

Milliken won the 129 miles (208 km) Goulburn to Sydney in 1932 and twice set the fastest time, in 1932 and 1933. Milliken’s time in 1932 of 5hr 46' 10 1/5" was faster that the professional cyclists race.

Milliken rode strongly in individual time trials, often referred to at the time as unpaced races, including the then Olympic distance of 100 kilometres (62 mi). In 1931 he won the 20 Mile Victorian time trial and twice won the Victorian 100 kilometres (62 mi) time trial, in 1933 and 1934. Milliken won the 1932 100 kilometres (62 mi) Australian championship time trial at Hobart, Tasmania, but in a rare defeat, he failed to defend his title in 1933, beaten by J Buckley who also broke Milliken’s record. Milliken regained the Australian record in winning the Victorian 100 kilometres (62 mi) time trial in 1934 in a time of 2hrs 45' 42". Milliken again finished 2nd in the Australian championship time trial in 1934, this time to C Winterbottom.

Milliken broke 11 records in 1933, including the Sydney to Newcastle record in 5hrs 21' 27", the first attempt using the newly opened Sydney Harbour Bridge. Milliken won the 104 miles (167 km) Melbourne to Wonthaggi time trial, and event that the first 100 miles (160 km) carried with it the title Australian amateur road title. Milliken rode the 100 miles (160 km) in an Australian record time of 3hrs 45' 54".

While Milliken was best known as a road cyclist, he also competed on the track, such as in promotional events at Goulburn in 1933.

In 1934 Milliken set yet more records, breaking the world 25 mile amateur record by winning the Campbellfield Open Road Race with a time of 59' 6". Milliken also set the fastest time in the 39 miles (63 km) Melbourne to Geelong in a new course record of 1hr 23' 55".

Milliken was touted as a potential Empire Games and Olympic Games medallist, however no road cyclist was selected for the 1932 Olympics and Milliken did not finish in the 1931 Australian road championship. There was no road event at the 1934 British Empire Games. Milliken decided not to wait for the 1936 Olympics and turned professional in 1934.

== Professional career ==
After turning professional in 1934 Milliken was narrowly defeated by Fatty Lamb, with Hubert Opperman in 3rd place, in the Batman 1000 a race over 8 stages in Tasmania covering 1,000 miles (1,600 km) starting in Launceston and finishing in Ulverstone.

The biggest race of 1934 was the Centenary 1000, a 7-stage race over 1,052 miles (1,693 km) to mark the Centenary of Victoria. Milliken rode however he did not feature in the results for the first four stages. Stage 5 was marked by torrential downpours of rain hail and sleet as the riders climbed Mount Buffalo and Milliken suffered a puncture and had to wait more than an hour for a spare wheel. It was reported that Milliken was almost frozen and he abandoned the race.

In 1935 Milliken was part of a team, led by Opperman and organised by Bruce Small, that travelled to England to attack various distance records. Other team members were Hefty Stuart, Harold and Eddie Smith, Joe Walsh and New Zealand's Hubert Turtill. Milliken broke the tandem record for the 211 miles (340 km) London-Bath-London, with Opperman, in 8hr 55' 34".

He broke the record for London-Brighton-London, covering the 104 miles (167 km) in 4hrs 39' 15". Riding with Stuart, they broke the London-Brighton-London tandem record in 4hrs 9' 53", the 137 miles (220 km) London-Portsmouth-London tandem record in 6hrs 34' 7". and the 196 miles (315 km) London to York in 8 hrs 15'. Milliken and Stuart carried on to ride 275 miles (443 km) to break the tandem 12-hour record.

Opperman, Stuart & Milliken went to Belgium for the 1935 UCI Road World Championships, where Milliken retired in the 8th lap with a puncture.

Milliken was reported to be disappointed with the tour of England, with Harold Smith stating "Milliken rode some very hard races during the UK tour. He didn't get the pick of the races and was paid poorly for his efforts. Ernie was the fastest rider on the UK tour."

In 1938 Milliken rode in the Barnett Glass Grand Prix of 160 miles (260 km) however he crashed and did not finish. He was reported to have ridden from Sydney to the event.
