= Dave Watson (cyclist) =

Australian cyclist

Personal information
- Born: 19 December 1946 (age 79)

Cycling career
- Sport: Cycling

David "Dave" Nicholas Watson (born 19 December 1946) is a former Australian cyclist. He competed in the team time trial at the 1968 Summer Olympics. Watson set the fastest time in the amateur Goulburn to Sydney Classic in 1969 run in reverse direction from Milperra to Goulburn.
