= Nino Borsari =

Italian cyclist (1911–1996)

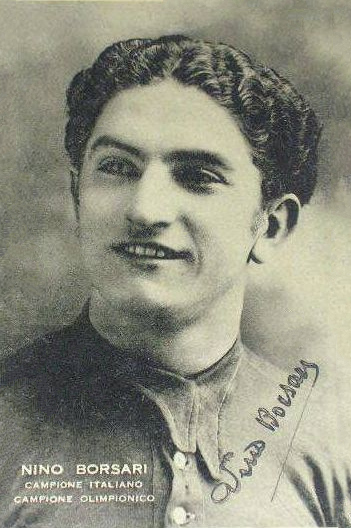

Personal information
- Born: 14 December 1911 Cavezzo, Italy
- Died: 31 March 1996 (aged 84) Carlton, Victoria, Australia

Cycling career
- Sport: Cycling
Medal record
Representing Italy
Men's cycling
Olympic Games
Gold medal – first place	1932 Los Angeles	Team pursuit

Nino Borsari (14 December 1911 – 31 March 1996) was an Italian cyclist who won a gold medal in the 4000 metres team pursuit event at the 1932 Summer Olympics.

== Early life ==
Borsari was born on 14 December 1911 in Cavezzo, Italy. His mother Rosa Borsari was unmarried at the time of his birth and he was raised by his mother's sisters. According to his biographer Ilma Martinuzzi O'Brien, his "early years were spent in poverty, but the gift of a racing bicycle by a benevolent employer changed his life".

== Cycling career ==
Borsari was a youth cycling champion in Italy and was chosen for the 1932 Summer Olympics in Los Angeles. He won a gold medal in the 4,000-metre team pursuit event and returned to Italy via New York City, where he competed in track cycling at Madison Square Garden.

In 1934, Borsari traveled to Australia to compete in the Centenary 1000, one-week road bicycle race over seven stages covering 1,102 miles (1,773 km). The race was run in as part of the celebrations of the Centenary of Victoria. Paul Chocque a member of the French silver medal team pursuit at the 1932 Summer Olympics also competed. Commenting before the race, Hubert Opperman stated that Bosari "is a mystery. Gay and laughing always, he does not appear to view the contest with any trepidation and, frankly, on his mileage to date, I feel that he will not figure prominently early." Borsari did not figure in the results of the first two stages, but was 2nd fastest in A Grade in Stage 3, having won the town sprints in Ararat and Ballarat Borsari rode strongly in the arduous sixth stage, extended to 152 miles (245 km) after stage 5 had to be stopped at Mount Buffalo due to a torrential downpour of rain hail and sleet., being crowned "Champion of the Alps" as the first A Grade rider into Omeo, and was 2nd in A Grade at Sale, behind Richard Lamb. Borsari backed up again in the final stage, coming 3rd in the A Grade sprint, and finishing 5th overall.

Along the way, Borsari made a point of selecting the prettiest girl at Warrnambool.

Borsari returned to Italy and rode the 1936 Giro d'Italia, but finished well outside the top places.

== Later life ==
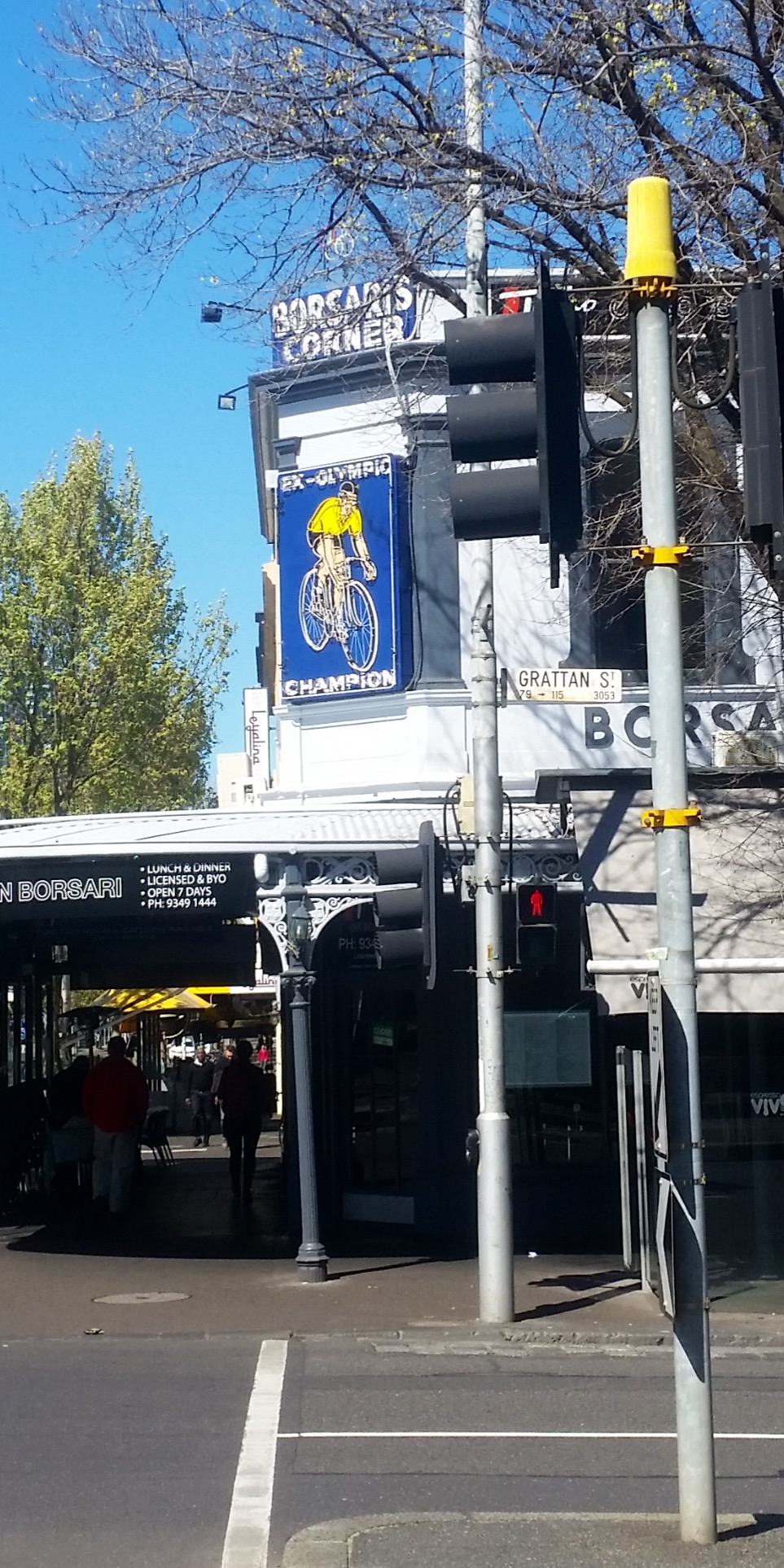
Borsari's Corner in Carlton

Borsari settled in Australia permanently in March 1940. Despite his status as a prominent enemy alien, he was not subject to internment after Italy entered World War II in June 1940. He was investigated by Australian security officials who concluded that he "appears to take no interest in anything but sport".

In 1941, Borsari moved to Melbourne and opened a bicycle shop in Carlton on the corner of Grattan Street and Lygon Street. He was naturalised as a British subject in March 1946 with the support of immigration minister Arthur Calwell. His bicycle shop, the Borsari Emporium, flourished after the war's end, marked by a neon sign depicting a cyclist. He expanded his offerings to include "household items, giftware, jewellery, and imported goods, including Italian magazines and newspapers".

Borsari continued to cycle semi-professionally and also competed in motor racing, acting as the local agent for Cisitalia sports cars. He helped establish the Juventus Soccer Club in 1948 and served a number of terms as president into the early 1970s. He also helped establish the International Cycling Club in 1952, which aimed to help new immigrants integrate through cycling.

In 1948, Borsari assisted in Melbourne's bid for the 1956 Summer Olympic Games. He later promoted the Melbourne Olympics on a trip to Europe in 1955. Outside of sports he was active in a number of other community and charitable organisations and was nicknamed the "King of Carlton" and the "Mayor of Little Italy". He stood unsuccessfully for the Melbourne City Council in 1969, running for the Australian Labor Party.

== Personal life ==
In 1941, Borsari married Fanny Cester, an Italian-born opera singer; the couple had two children. He suffered serious injuries in an accident in 1978 when he was knocked off his bicycle by a car, requiring brain surgery. He was widowed in 1988 and died in Kew on 31 March 1996, aged 84.

== Honours and legacy ==
Borsari was made a knight of the Order of Merit of the Italian Republic in 1962 for his "keen and energetic promotion of Italo-Australian Associations of a sporting and recreational character". The corner of Lygon Street and Grattan Street in Carlton has been known for decades as Borsari's Corner. A neon sign depicting Borsari on his track bicycle under the Olympic rings marks the corner, over Borsari Ristorante. Next door is the Borsario Building, and one door further down is Borsari Cycles.

== Palmarès ==
1932
(gold) 1932 Los Angeles | Team pursuit
1934
2nd Milano – Modena, Modena (Emilia-Romagna), Italy
3rd Corsa del Commercio, (Milano (a)), Milano (Lombardia), Italy
Centenary 1000

2nd in A Grade Stage 3
Champion of the Alps – Mt Buffalo to Omeo
4th and 2nd fastest Stage 6
3rd in A Grade stage 7
5th Overall in championship

1935
1st Piacenza (a), Piacenza (Emilia-Romagna), Italy
1936
Giro d'Italia
