= Frankie Thomas (cyclist) =

Australian cyclist

Personal information
- Full name: Frankie Thomas
- Born: 28 November 1906 Bendigo, Australia
- Died: 1978 Melbourne

Cycling career
- Sport: Cycling
- Discipline: Road
- Role: Rider

Frankie Thomas was an Australian racing cyclist who competed on both road and track, as was typical of Australian cyclists of the era such as Hubert Opperman.

== Major results ==
1929
Fastest Gippsland 100 mile race
1930
5th Sydney to Melbourne stage race
2nd fastest time Goulburn to Sydney
1931
Competed in the Tour de France but did not finish
1932
2nd in Brisbane, Six Days, Brisbane (Queensland), Australia
Fastest time in 140 mile Tour of Gippsland
1933
Fastest time in Melbourne to Ballarat
Fastest time Goulburn to Sydney
2nd Tour of Tasmania
1936
Fastest time 140 mile Tour of Gippsland

== Australian professional cycling career ==
Thomas rode as an amateur from 1926 to 1928 and turned professional in 1929. In 1929 Thomas rode a Preston Star bicycle but by 1930 he was riding for the Malvern Star bicycle company.

In his first year as a professional, Thomas beat Opperman in a Gippsland 100 miles (160 km) race.

In 1930 Thomas set the second fastest time in the Goulburn to Sydney handicap race behind Opperman. Thomas rode in the Sydney to Melbourne stage race, a five-day stage race styled on the European races covering 706 miles (1,136 km) in which the celebrity riders were Opperman and two Frenchmen, Joseph Mauclair and Jean Bidot. Thomas won stage 3 and was 2nd in stage 4 and stage 5. Mauclair won the race with Thomas finishing 5th overall.

Thomas rode in the 1931 Tour de France in a combined Australia/Switzerland team including Opperman, Ossie Nicholson and Richard "Fatty" Lamb. Thomas finished 56th in stage 1, 54th in stage 2. Thomas had stomach trouble and did not finish stage 3.

In 1932 Thomas finished 2nd with Archie McLannan in the Brisbane, Six Days behind Jack Standen and Fatty Lamb and ahead of Opperman and Jack Fitzgerald in 3rd. Thomas also set the fastest time in the 140 miles (230 km) Tour of Gippsland

In 1933 he set the fastest time in the Melbourne to Ballarat, the fastest time in the Goulburn to Sydney and finished 2nd in the Tour of Tasmania, a six-day stage race covering 566 miles (911 km), beaten by Fatty Lamb by just 1 second.

In July 1934 Thomas was disqualified for 18 months for pushing P. Veitch in the Quayle road race at Ballarat, on 21 July 1934.

Thomas returned to cycling in 1936 and set the fastest time in the 140 miles (230 km) Tour of Gippsland.
