= Dylan Sunderland =

Australian bicycle racer

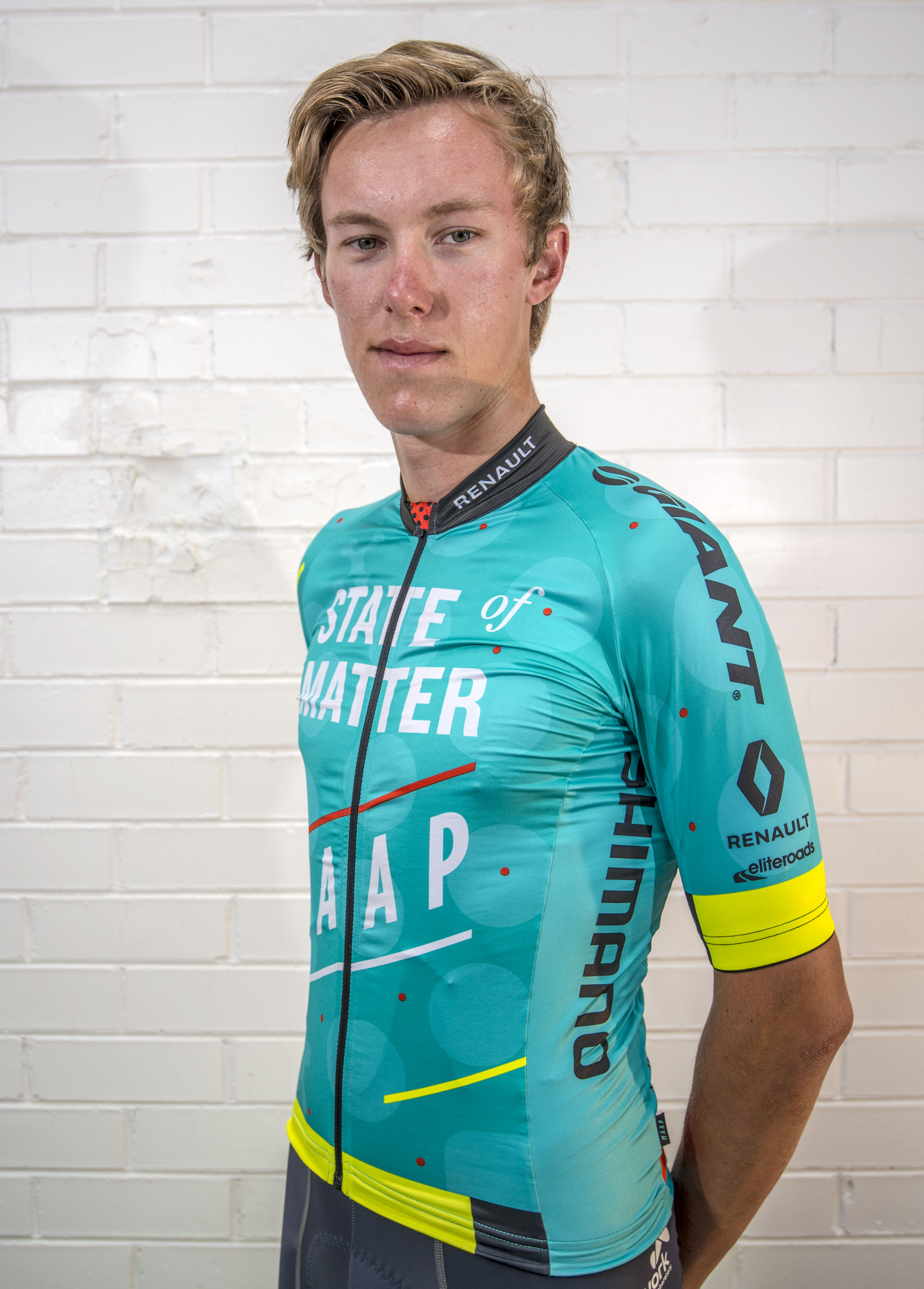

Personal information
- Born: 26 February 1996 (age 30) Inverell, Australia
- Height: 1.8 m (5 ft 11 in)
- Weight: 67 kg (148 lb)

Cycling career
- Sport: Cycling
- Discipline: Road
- Role: Rider

Professional teams
- 2016: State of Matter MAAP Racing
- 2017: New South Wales Institute of Sport
- 2018: Bennelong SwissWellness Cycling Team
- 2019: Team BridgeLane
- 2020–2021: NTT Pro Cycling
- 2022: Global 6 Cycling
- 2023: St George Continental Cycling Team

Dylan Sunderland (born 26 February 1996) is an Australian professional racing cyclist, who most recently rode for UCI Continental team St George Continental Cycling Team.

== Major results ==
2015
3rd Overall Tour of Tasmania

1st Stage 4

6th Road race, Oceania Under-23 Road Championships
2016
4th Overall Tour of Tasmania

1st Young rider classification

2017
4th Overall Tour of Tasmania
Oceania Road Championships

6th Road race
6th Under-23 time trial

8th Overall North Star Grand Prix

1st Stage 6

2018
1st Overall Tour of Tasmania

1st Stage 1

5th Overall Herald Sun Tour

1st Young rider classification

2019
4th Overall Tour de Savoie Mont-Blanc
5th Road race, National Road Championships
6th Road race, Oceania Road Championships
9th Overall Herald Sun Tour
1st Overall Tour of Tasmania

1st Stage 3

2023
1st Stage 2 Tour of Thailand
7th Grafton to Inverell Classic

=== Grand Tour general classification results timeline ===
Grand Tour	2020	2021
Giro d'Italia	114	—
Tour de France	—	—
Vuelta a España	—	104

Legend
—	Did not compete
DNF	Did not finish
