= Graham Seers =

Australian cyclist (born 1958)

Personal information
- Born: 22 September 1958 (age 68)

Cycling career
- Sport: Cycling
- Discipline: Road

Major wins
- Goulburn to Sydney Classic: 1982 – fastest amateur; 1984 – fastest amateur

Graham Seers (born 22 September 1958) is an Australian former road cyclist and cycling administrator. He competed in the individual road race event at the 1980 Summer Olympics.

Seers twice set the fastest time in the amateur Goulburn to Sydney Classic in 1982 and 1984 run from Goulburn to Liverpool.
