= Richard Lamb =

Australian cyclist

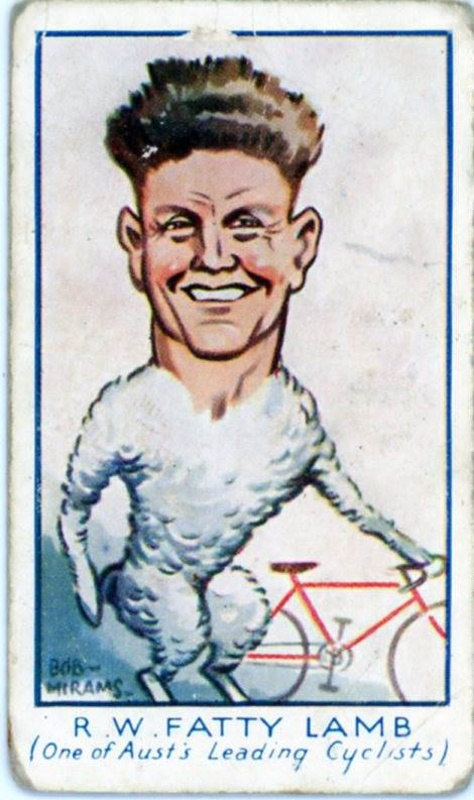

Personal information
- Full name: Richard William Lamb
- Nickname: Fatty
- Born: 26 December 1907 Melbourne, Australia
- Died: 7 July 1974 (aged 66) Paynesville
- Weight: 11 st 10 lb (74 kg)

Cycling career
- Sport: Cycling
- Disciplines: Road & track
- Role: Rider

Richard William "Fatty" Lamb (26 December 1907 – 7 July 1974) was an Australian racing cyclist who competed on both road and track, as was typical of Australian cyclists of the era such as Hubert Opperman. Throughout his career, Lamb was associated with Malvern Star Bicycles and Bruce Small.

== Major results ==
1925
Motor-paced cycling record for 10 miles in 11' 22"".
1st and fastest amateur time Goulburn to Sydney.
1926
1st and fastest amateur time Goulburn to Sydney
1927
9th and fastest amateur time Goulburn to Sydney
1st Victorian Olympic Time Trial test race
1st the Australian Olympic Time Trial test race
1928
2nd amateur Goulburn to Sydney
1929
1st Austral Wheel Race
1930
1st Australasian road championship title and Blue Riband in the Warrnambool to Melbourne
1931
35th & last finisher in the Tour de France
1st Grand Prix de Marseilles (motor pace)
1932
1st Australasian road championship title and Blue Riband in the Warrnambool to Melbourne
1st in Brisbane, Six Days, Brisbane (Queensland), Australia
1933
One hour motor paced record of 60 miles 575 yards
1st Tour of Tasmania
1934
1st Batman 1000
Centenary 1000

3rd and fastest Stage 6
3rd overall in championship and Australian national road race title

== Australian amateur cycling career ==
In August 1925 Lamb made his first attempt at motor-paced cycling riding 10 miles in 11' 22", easily beating the Australasian amateur record of 17' 32" and the British Empire record of 14' 21". During this ride, Lamb was reported to have broken eight world's records, eight British Empire records, nineteen Victorian standing and flying start records, and a similar number of Australasian records.

Lamb won the Goulburn to Sydney race twice, in 1925 and 1926. The Goulburn to Sydney was a handicap race where the slower riders start first. On each occasion Lamb started from scratch, being the last group to start, and in winning the race, also set the fastest time. The win in 1926 was controversial because Lamb had swapped bikes with another competitor, which was contrary to the written rules, however an official from the NSW Cyclists Union had assured riders before the start that they would not be disqualified for changing bikes. In 1927 Lamb was again starting from scratch and again set the fastest time, but came 9th on handicap, with the winner JA Shaw starting 52 minutes before Lamb. Lamb's time in 1925 was 6h 17' 55" which was 6' 35" better that the amateur record and 1' 36" better than the best professional time for the race. In 1927 Lamb finished in 6h 00' 44".

Newspapers at the time reported that Lamb was expected to be selected for the Australian team to the 1928 Summer Olympics in Amsterdam. Lamb won the Victorian Olympic Time Trial test race in October 1927, covering 126 miles in 6h 14'43", winning by over 24 minutes. He then won the Australian Olympic Time Trial test race in November 1927, covering 120 miles in 6h 08'14", winning by over 36 minutes. Lamb also competed in the Australian Olympic track trials but was not successful.

Lamb was controversially overlooked for the Australian team, with no rider being sent for the road events and Dunc Gray and Jack Standen being sent for the track events.

== Australian professional cycling career ==
After being overlooked for the Olympics, Lamb chose to turn professional in February 1928, for £1,000 for the season. In his first race as a professional he won a 10-mile Motor-paced event in a season best time of 11' 56".

Lamb again rode the Goulburn to Sydney in 1928, again from scratch, this time as a professional and came second behind Ken Ross, also from scratch.

In 1929 Lamb won the Austral Wheel Race. He then spent six months riding in the United States, defeating motor-paced champion Franco Giorgetti, George Chapman, Charles Jaeger, and Francesco Zucchetti. Lamb also led the first 2 days of the 6 days’ race at Chicago but had to withdraw due to injury.

Lamb twice won the Australian national road race title in 1930 and 1932, by winning the Blue Riband for the fastest time in the Warrnambool to Melbourne.. Lamb set a record time of 6h 21' 18" in 1932, nearly 2 hours faster than his time in 1930.

Lamb rode in the 1931 Tour de France in a combined Australia/Switzerland team including Opperman, Ossie Nicholson and Frankie Thomas. He finished in 35th place and was the last finisher. After the Tour de France, Lamb won the Grand Prix de Marseilles (motor pace)

In 1932 Lamb won the Brisbane, Six Days with Jack Standen, defeating a quality field including Frankie Thomas, Opperman and Jack Fitzgerald. He had a falling out with Bruce Small in September 1932, going to work for a rival manufacturer Finlay Brothers.

In February 1933 Lamb rode 60 miles and 575 yards in an hour to break the motor paced record set by Opperman in 1930. By April 1933 Lamb had reconciled with Bruce Small, with advertisements quoting Lamb as stating "from now on, I'm sticking to Malvern Star". He also won the Tour of Tasmania, a six-day stage race covering 566 miles (911 km), beating Frankie Thomas by 1 second.

In 1934 Lamb again won the Tour of Tasmania, titled the "Batman 1000" a race over 8 stages covering 1,000 miles (1,600 km) starting in Launceston and finishing in Ulverstone. Lamb narrowly defeated Ern Milliken with Opperman in 3rd place. Lamb had barely completed one long stage race when he set off in the next, for the rich prize purse in the Centenary 1000, a one-week race over seven stages covering 1,102 miles (1,773 km) that carried with it the Australasian road championship title. While Lamb did not feature in the early stages, his strength showed through on the arduous sixth stage, extended to 152 miles (245 km) after stage 5 had to be stopped at Mount Buffalo due to a torrential downpour of rain hail and sleet. Lamb was 3rd and fastest at Sale, and finished 3rd overall in the championship and the Australasian road championship title.

== Personal ==
Lamb was born in Melbourne on 26 December 1907, the son of Frederick Lamb and Alice née Merrick. His cousin Eddie Lamb was also a professional cyclist. In July 1932 Lamb married Elizabeth May Haddow. He died at Paynesville on 7 July 1974 (aged 66).
