= William Spencer (cyclist) =

American cyclist (1895–1963)

Willie Spencer
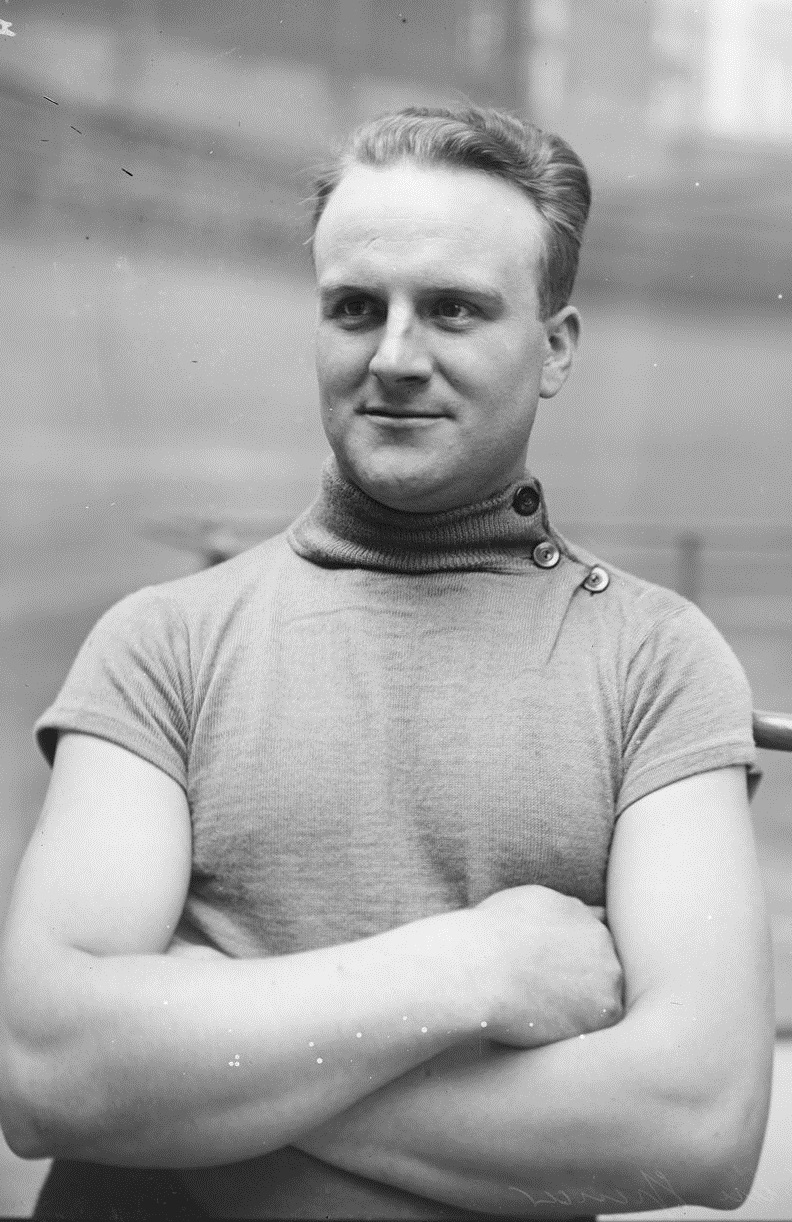

Personal information
- Full name: William Gerald Spencer
- Born: 14 November 1895 Manchester, Great Britain
- Died: 2 October 1963 (aged 67) Los Angeles, California, United States

Cycling career
- Sport: Cycling
- Discipline: Track
- Role: Rider

William "Willie" Spencer (1895 – 1963) was a naturalized American professional bicycle racer in the early 1900s. A world record holder for the quarter mile, he also won the American Sprint Championship three times.

== History ==
Born in Manchester, England, Willie Spencer moved to Toronto at a young age with his family, among which his younger brother Arthur Bratt Spencer (1897-1974), who would also compete as a cyclist. He entered the world of professional bicycle racing in 1916. He had several significant victories in his early years, including winning the 1917 Six-Days of San Francisco, with Jake Magin, and twice placing 4th in the American Sprint Championship, before he was drafted for six months of service in the United States Army. After his release in January 1919, Spencer continued racing, clocking victories around the world and, in 1920, setting a world record while racing in Australia for doing 0.25 miles (0.40 km) in 25 seconds. In 1922, 1923 and 1926, he won the American Sprint Championship. Spencer became an American citizen in 1920. He was inducted into the United States Bicycling Hall of Fame in 2005.
