= Edna Sayers =

Australian cyclist

Personal information
- Born: 1912
- Died: 1996 (aged 83–84)

Cycling career
- Sport: Cycling
- Disciplines: Road & track
- Role: Rider
- Rider type: Endurance

Professional team
- Malvern Star

Edna Sayers (1912–1996) was an Australian cyclist who held records for long distance cycling, most notably the fastest time from Goulburn to Sydney.

Sayers was born in 1912, the eldest of 6 children of Alfred George and Elizabeth Mary Sayers. Sayers mother died in October 1927, and she took on responsibility for her siblings. Sayers started cycling and in 1932, aged 20, Sayers was the first woman to record a win at the Canterbury velodrome. (Note: The board track velodrome was located at Charles St Canterbury, not the current "Canterbury velodrome" at Bayview Ave, Earlwood.) While the match was billed as the "Ladies interstate challenge", the Victorian Elsa Barbour decided not to compete as neither Sayers nor the other NSW cyclists were members of a registered club. Sayers trained with the Earlwood cycling club and was subsequently a member of the Canterbury-Earlwood Women's Cycling Club.

Women were not permitted to compete in races such as the Goulburn to Sydney. The race however was held on public roads and in 1932 Lilian Thorpe set a time for the then course from Goulburn to Enfield of 9 hours 52 minutes. In 1933 Sayers tackled the course on the same day as the men, setting off half an hour prior to the male professionals, lowering the record to 7 hours 41 minutes and 5 seconds. Sayers continued to attack the record, with a strong tailwind helping to lower her record to 6 hours 11 minutes and 30 seconds in 1935. In 1936 as part of her record-breaking ride from Canberra to Sydney, Sayers set a new record for Goulburn to the Sydney GPO of 7 hours 43 minutes and 8 seconds. Sayers time for the 192 miles (309 km) from Canberra to Sydney was 11 hours, 0 minutes and 8 seconds.

Another popular cycling record route was Bathurst to Sydney and in 1936 Sayers established the women's record of 8 hours 38 minutes and 50.5 seconds for the 134.5 miles (216.5 km).

Sayers worked at a woollen mill in Marrickville and continued to live in Earlwood until the 1970s when she moved to Budgewoi. Sayers continued to be involved in cycling, establishing a women's cycling club there. A cycleway and pedestrian bridge over Saltwater creek, Longjetty, was named after Sayers in 1982. Sayers died in 1996.
