= Goulburn to Sydney Classic =

Former cycling race in New South Wales

Goulburn to Sydney
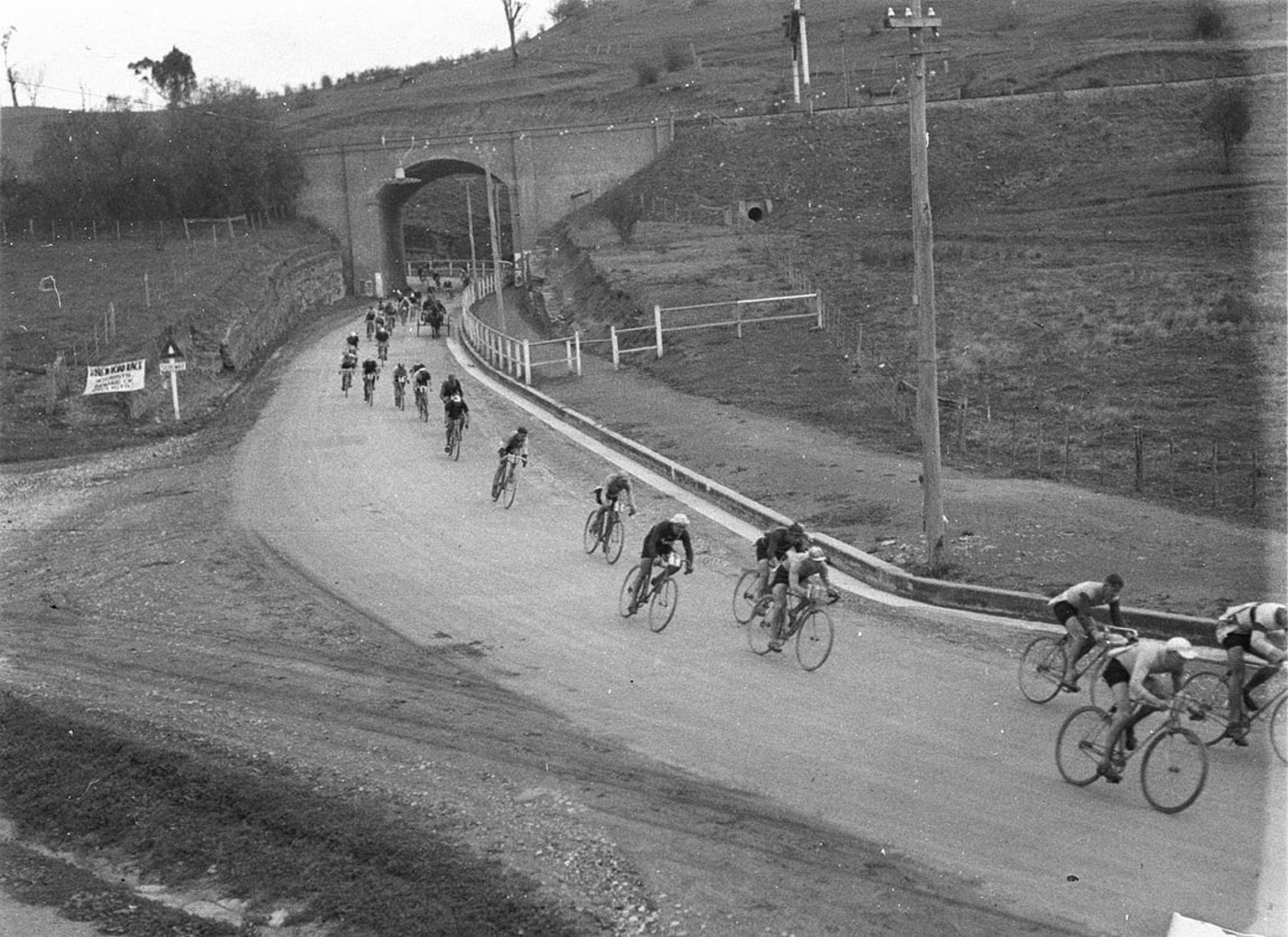
- A line of cyclists coming through the arch of the railway bridge at Picton A line of cyclists coming through the arch of the railway bridge at Picton

General
Established	1902
Disstablished	2012
Held	September
Country	Australia
Region	New South Wales
Type	One day classic

Data
Editions	93
First Winner	Charlie Littlechild, (NSW)
Most Recent	Luke Davison, (NSW)
Most fastest times	5 – Kerry Hoole, (NSW)

The Goulburn to Sydney cycling race was a one-day road bicycle race. The first race was held in 1902 with the last in 2012.

== History ==
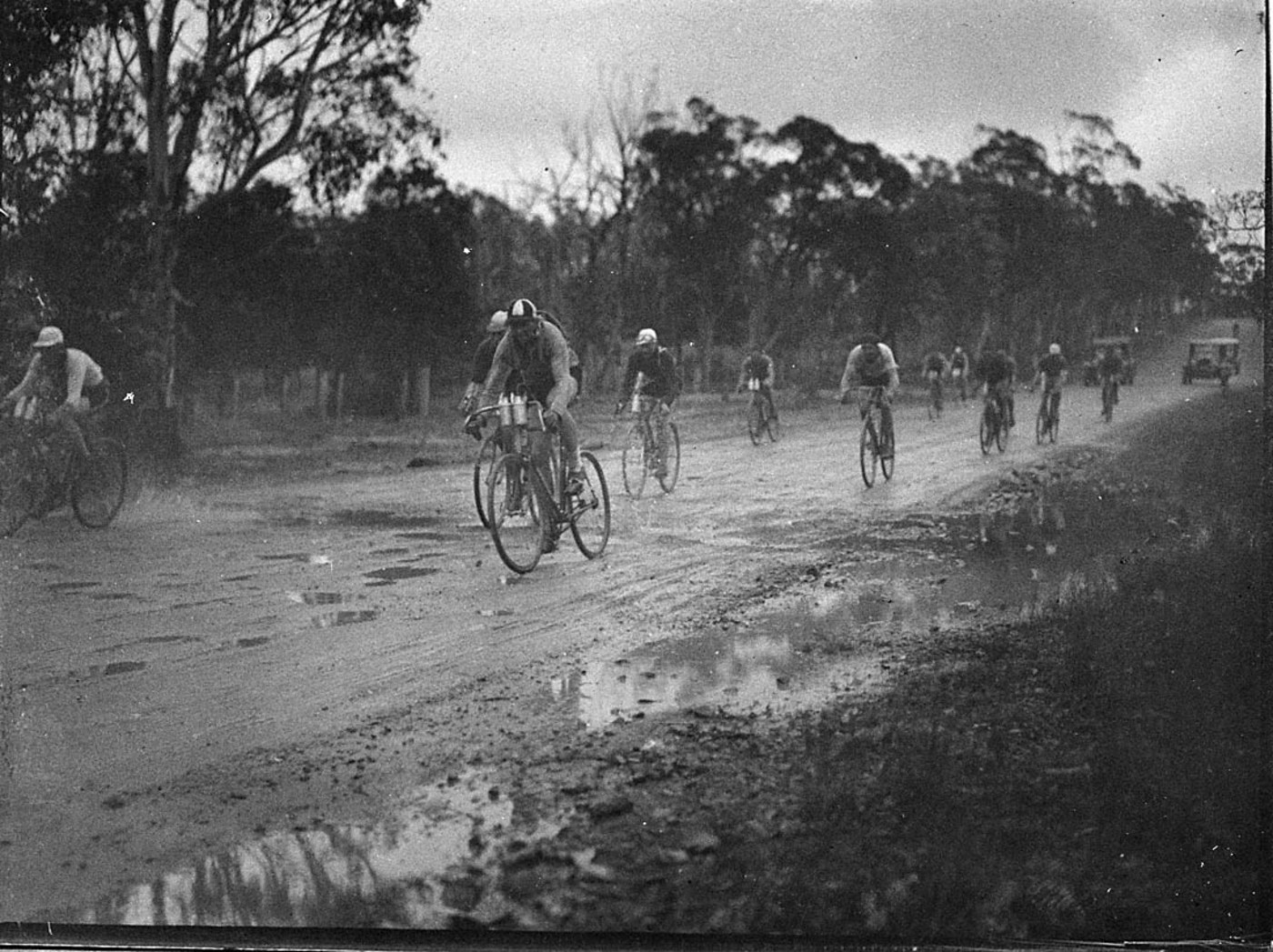
Dunlop Road race Goulburn to Sydney

The route from Goulburn to Sydney via the Hume Highway was popular with cyclists in the late 19th century and numerous record attempts were made for the journey finishing at the Sydney GPO. In 1896 the League of Wheelmen organised a race from Goulburn to Ashfield which was won by H Hayes. The fastest time was Arthur Graeme in 7 hours 59 minutes.

The Goulburn to Sydney became an annual event from 1902. The race was initially promoted by Dunlop Rubber who also promoted the Warrnambool to Melbourne Classic From 1902 until 1912 the fastest NSW rider was selected to appear for NSW in the Warrnambool to Melbourne Classic. The race was initially organised by the League of NSW Wheelmen for professional riders. Two races were held in 1906, on 22 September organised by the newly formed NSW Cyclists Association and on 24 November by the League of NSW Wheelmen.

There were calls for an amateur event however these did not come to fruition until 1913 when Dunlop Rubber cancelled the 1913 Goulburn classic. The NSW Cycling Union organised an amateur race as a selection race for the 1916 Summer Olympics.

The race was a handicap race from 1902 to 1993, with riders leaving Goulburn at different intervals. In 1945 the handicap system for the professional race changed to starting in three groups. The professional race was conducted as a massed start or a scratch race from 1951 to 1954 and 1970–1971, however the amateur event continued to be a handicap. From 1985 the professional and amateur races were replaced by a single open race. The open race was conducted as a handicap in 1985–1986 and 1988–1993. From 1994 the race was conducted as a scratch race.

Kerry Hoole set the fastest time on five occasions. Seven riders have set the fastest time on three occasions, Rodney Crowe, Fred Kerz, Richard Lamb, Robert Leach, Hubert Opperman, Ken Ross, Alfred Strom, Charles Winterbottom. No rider has won the event more than twice, with Richard Lamb, Kevin Massard, Hubert Opperman, Alf Overton, Mark Robinson, Eddy Salas, each achieving two wins.

In 1939 no race was held because the Police Department placed a ban on bicycle racing on main roads in NSW. The race was again banned by the police from 1948 to 1950

In 2013 the teams insisted upon a full rolling road closure. The police would not approve a rolling road closure of the Hume Highway and would only approve a single lane rolling road closure, which was not acceptable to the teams. Alternate roads were considered however no agreement could be reached and the event was cancelled.

=== The Route ===
Historically, the route started in Goulburn in the Southern Highlands and followed what is now known as the Hume Highway to Sydney. There have been various changes to the route over time, reflecting the changes to the Hume Highway and the finish point has varied from Ashfield Town Hall 1902–1913; Enfield 1920–1922, 1924–1936; Merrylands 1923; Lidcombe 1937–1941 & 1946–1952; Sydney Sports Ground 1944; Wiley Park velodrome 1945; Bankstown 1959–1962; Liverpool 1974–1994; and Camden 1995–2012. The race was run in the reverse direction finishing at Goulburn and starting at Enfield in 1953–1958; Milperra 1963–1972 and Hoxton Park 1973

=== Records and Fast times ===
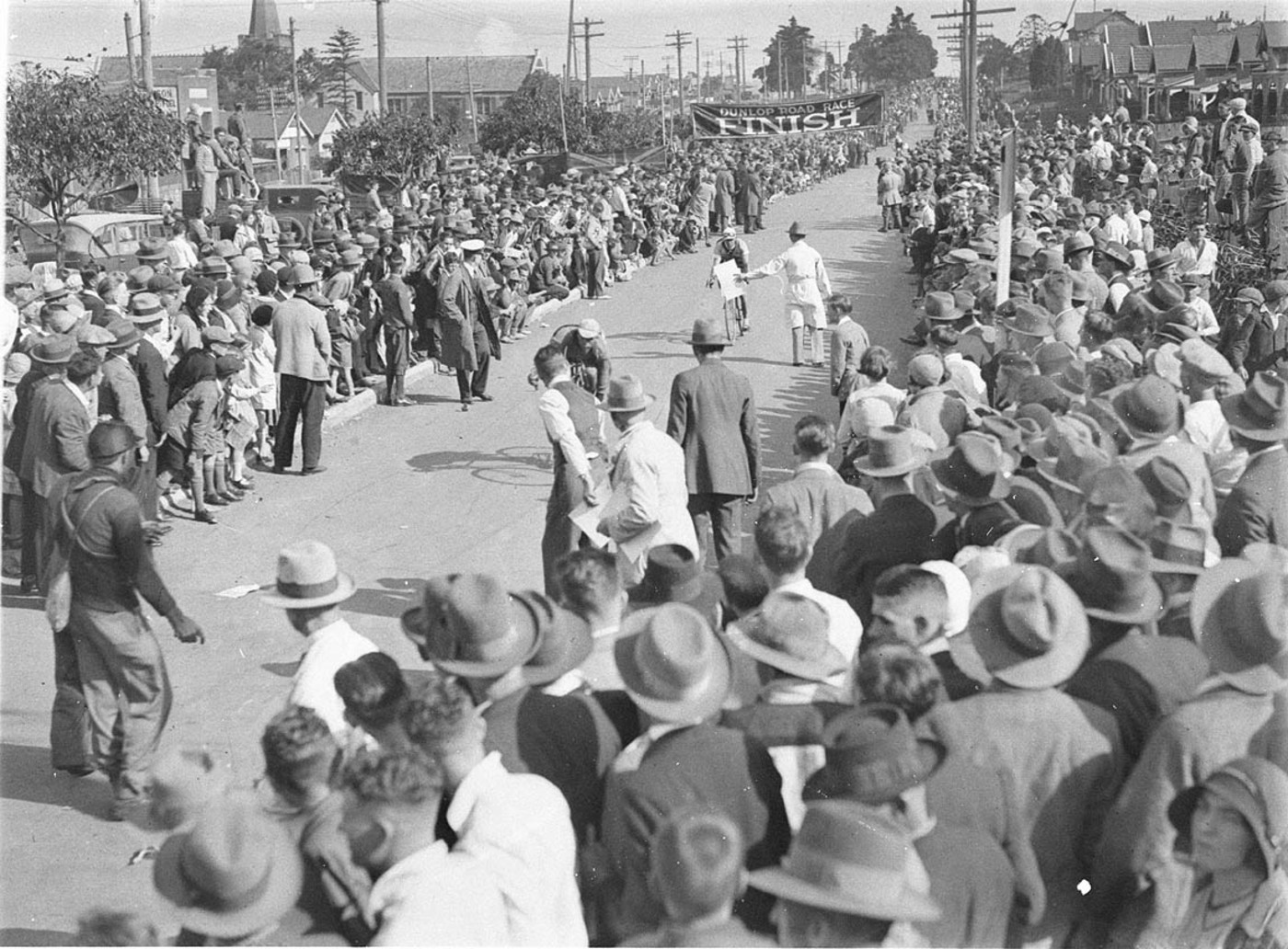
Finish at Enfield

In 1890 Captain Mark Long set the record for the then 137 miles (220 km) in 18½ hours. There were a flurry of attempts in the early 20th century, with the successful attempts being Charlie Orr in 10hrs 38', P Allssoff 10hrs 28, C Melrose 10hr 22½', G E Green amateur record 11hrs 2' and Somerville 9hr 45'.

Littlechild, in winning the 1902 race, beat Graeme's 1896 race record to Ashfield and then continued on to the GPO in 8hrs 20' 30" to eclipse Sommerville's record.

The record to the Sydney GPO does not appear to have been broken since the 1930s, with the professional record being 6hrs 57' 56" set by Frankie Thomas in 1932 as part of his ride from Canberra to Sydney. The amateur record was last set at 5hrs 47' 4" in 1937 by Charles Winterbottom. Since 1937 any speed record attempt on public streets in NSW required the approval of the Commissioner of Police.

There have been so many changes to the road surface, road alignment, distance, direction and finishing location that trying to identify a race record is an exercise in semantics. The following however are some of the more notable times. In the professional ranks, Don Kirkham's time of 6hr 19' to Ashfield in 1911 was not eclipsed until Percy Osborn's ride of 6hrs 2m 50s in 1927. Osborn's time of 5hrs 56' 40" to Enfield was the first race time under six hours. By 1935 the race time to Enfield was reduced to 5hrs 2' 31" by Joseph Buckley NSW and H P Veitch Victoria in a dead heat. The first to get under five hours was Kerry Hoole in 1965 from Milperra to Goulburn in the first of his four consecutive fastest times.

In the amateur ranks, Ern Pedersen's time of 6hr 24' 30" in 1913 was second only to Don Kirkham's professional time in 1911 and was not beaten until 1927 when Richard Lamb continued on to Ashfield. The first amateur under six hours was Edgar Johns in 1930 with a time of 5hrs 46' 10" Just five years later Charles Winterbottom had lowered the race time to 5hrs 05' 13" in the second of his three consecutive fastest times. The first amateur under five hours was David Watson in 1969 with a time of 4hrs 57' 20" for the Milperra to Goulburn route.

In the open era, Brett Dutton set the fastest time of 3hrs 40' 34" to Liverpool. With the Camden finish, including a lap of razorback, the fastest time was that of Richard Lang in 2009 in 3hrs 45' 31"

=== Women's race ===
Women did not compete in the Goulburn to Sydney prior to 1980. When women's races were run, they were over shorter distances, such as in 1947 there was a race Camden to Sydney, won by Miss J Whiteley and the fastest time was Mrs O Herd Women did however set records on the course at the time of running the event, with Lillian Thorpe setting a time of 9hr 52' in 1932. Edna Sayers lowered the record to 7hr 41' 5" in 1933, and to 6hrs 11' 30" in 1935. In 1936 as part of her record-breaking ride from Canberra to Sydney, Edna Sayers set a new record for Goulburn to the Sydney GPO of 7hrs 43' 8". In 1980 one woman from Canberra and one from Turramurra entered the amateur event, with Shaine Mulholland being reported as the first woman to finish the course, with Mishka Davies second.. In 2000 there was a separate women's race, won by Nathalie Bates. In 2008 were able to enter the open event. Women wanting to enter the event needed to be graded C and above and needed specific approval as the race exceeded the UCI maximum distance for women. The first female was Oenone Wood who finished 43rd overall.

== Winners by year ==
For details of second and third as well as the fastest time, see the lists maintained by Cycling NSW for Amateur and Open and Professional.

Goulburn to Sydney Winners
Year	First Professional	Fastest Professional	First Amateur	Fastest Amateur
Goulburn to Ashfield
1902	Charlie Littlechild	Charlie Littlechild	-
1903	Oliver H. Brooks (NSW)	Dave Cupples (Vic)	-
1904	Tom Robinson	Jack Arnst (NZ)	-
1905	Mark Robinson (NSW)	Jack Arnst (NZ)	-
1906	A.E. Fowler	A.E. Fowler	-
1906	Richard Herman Jefferay	Leslie Oswald Sydney Burr (NSW)	-
1907	Arthur Walcott	George Horder (NSW)	-
1908	Mark Robinson (NSW)	Tom Larcombe (NSW)	-
1909	P.W. Hardy (Vic)	H Lundie (NSW)	-
1910	Don Kirkham (Vic)	Don Kirkham (Vic)	-
1911	William Rennie (Vic)	Don Kirkham (Vic)	-
1912	C.W. Upham	Arthur Walcott	-
1913	-		Ern W. Pederson (NSW)	Ern W. Pederson (NSW)
1914–1919	No race during World War I
Goulburn to Enfield
1920	W.H. Williams (NSW)	Ken Ross (NSW)	-
1921	-		H. Paulston (NSW)	Mick Little (NSW)
Goulburn to Merrylands
1922	-		Alf Flood (NSW)	Fred Kerz (NSW)
1923	-		Edward Clarke (NSW)	C. Burness (NSW) & Alf Flood (NSW)
Goulburn to Enfield
1924	Hubert Opperman (Vic)	Hubert Opperman (Vic)	Harry Thomas (NSW)	Fred Kerz (NSW)
1925	D. Brookes	R J Cruise (Vic)	Richard Lamb (Vic)	Richard Lamb (Vic)
1926	R A Munro	Ken Ross (NSW)	Richard Lamb (Vic)	Richard Lamb (Vic)
1927	P J Hird (NSW)	Percy Osborn	J A Shaw (NSW)	Richard Lamb (Vic)
1928	Ken Ross (NSW)	Ken Ross (NSW)	J Rodgers	Fred Kerz (NSW)
1929	Hubert Opperman (Vic)	Hubert Opperman (Vic)	W McMurtrie (NSW)	Bruce McWhirter (NSW)
1930	George Hird	Hubert Opperman (Vic)	F Burley (NSW)	Edgar Johns (NSW)
1931	W Freebairn (NSW)	Norman Gilroy (NSW)	A T Kenney (NSW)	Joe Buckley (NSW)
1932	T Brown (NSW)	Harry Cruise (Vic)	Ern Milliken (Vic)	Ern Milliken (Vic)
1933	G Humphries (NSW)	Frankie Thomas (Vic)	WA McKenzie (NSW)	Ern Milliken (Vic)
1934	C Staples (NSW)	Harry Cruise (Vic)	R Confoy	Charles Winterbottom (NSW)
1935	C Dredge	Joe Buckley (NSW) & Pat Veitch (Vic)	C Murray	Charles Winterbottom (NSW)
1936	Jack Summers (NSW)	Bill Moritz (SA)	M Rothwell (NSW)	Charles Winterbottom (NSW)
1937	J Confoy	J Christison	W Courtney (NSW)	Alfred Strom (NSW)
Goulburn to Lidcombe
1938	J Wood	Bill Moritz (SA)	W Barker	Alfred Strom (NSW)
1939–1940	Police banned bicycle racing on main roads in NSW.
1941	-		Noel Johnson (NSW)	Alfred Strom (NSW)
1942–1943
Goulburn to Sydney Sports Ground
1944	Alan Munro (Vic)	Harry Vincin (NSW)	Dave Little (NSW)	Arthur Cater (NSW)
Goulburn to Wiley Park
1945	Bernard O'Neill	Alan Munro (Vic)	L Lawson (NSW)	Ian Leary (NSW)
Goulburn to Lidcombe
1946	A Julius (NSW)	J Turnbull (NSW)	Ron Jones (NSW)	Jim Nestor (SA)
1947	Len Hammond (NSW)	Len Hammond (NSW)	Ben Thiele (NSW)	Jack More (NSW)
1948–1950	Police banned bicycle racing on main roads in NSW.
1951	Peter Anthony (Vic)	-	G Orr (NSW)	Neil Furniss (NSW)
Enfield to Goulburn
1952	Fred Arnold	-	Keith Manny (NSW)	Bob France
1953	Reginald Arnold	-	Ronald Shewan (NSW)	Barry Fry (NSW)
1954	Eddie Smith (Vic)	-	Reg Sherden (NSW)	Keith Manny (NSW)
1955	K Furness (NSW)	Robert Leach (NSW)	B Holder (NSW)	Colin Goodsell (NSW)
1956	William Sullivan (NSW)	Vic Young (NSW)	David McDougall (NSW)	Terry Flanagan (NSW)
1957	Barry Kline (NSW)	Les Cook (Vic)	John Hatton (NSW)	David McDougall (NSW)
1958	Thomas Wills (NSW)	Thomas Wills (NSW)	Geoff Schofield (NSW)	Cliff Burvill (NSW)
Goulburn to Bankstown
1959	Robert Leach (NSW)	Robert Leach (NSW)	Peter McSorley (NSW)	Feruccio Giovanetti (NSW)
1960	Kevin Massard (NSW)	Robert Leach (NSW)	Brian Drew (NSW)	Brian Drew (NSW)
1961	Alex Fulcher (NSW)	Alex Fulcher (NSW)	Martin Wild (GBR)	Brian Drew (NSW)
1962	Kevin Betteridge (NSW)	Thomas Wills (NSW)	Noel Christensen (NSW)	Frank Brazier (NSW)
Milperra to Goulburn
1963	Phil Butler (NSW)	Alex Fulcher (NSW)	Les Price (NSW)	Thomas Delaney (Vic)
1964	A Green (NSW)	Lew Bennett (NSW)	I Mawer (Vic)	Malcolm McCredie (NSW)
1965	Barry O'Laughlin (Vic)	Kerry Hoole (NSW)	Timo Savimaki (Qld)	Timo Savimaki (Qld)
1966	George Sleiker (Vic)	Kerry Hoole (NSW)	D Garrett (Qld)	Gary Teague (NSW)
1967	Alf Overton (NSW)	Kerry Hoole (NSW)	Donald Wilson (Vic)	Donald Wilson (Vic)
1968	Max McGinty (NSW)	Kerry Hoole (NSW)	Bruce Ryalls (NSW)	Kevin Morgan (Tas)
1969	William Massard (NSW)	Robert Whetters	Hugh Bartlett (NSW)	Dave Watson (NSW)
1970	Vic Adams (NSW)	-	Norm Burridge (NSW)	Ray Piper (NSW)
1971	Laurie Rogers (NSW)	-	Alan Spokes (NSW)	Alan Spokes (NSW)
1972	Glenn Pitham (NSW)	Kerry Hoole (NSW)	Stephen Dixon (NSW)	Barry Ulyatt (NZ)
Goulburn to Liverpool
1973	Robert Whetters (NSW)	Robert Whetters	J Phillipson (Vic)	Richard Paris (NSW)
1974	Don Horley (GBR)	Vic Adams (NSW)	Harold Shaw (Vic)	Terry Parkes (NSW)
1975	Ken Jones (NSW)	Rodney Crowe (NSW)	Norm Sargent (NSW)	Wayne Nicholls (NSW)
1976	Norm Stevens (NSW)	Rodney Crowe (NSW)	Walter Baer (NSW)	Alan Spokes (NSW)
1977	Wayne Lewis (NSW)	Rodney Crowe (NSW)	Richard Small (NSW)	Robert Glindeman (NSW)
1978	Alf Overton (NSW)	Shane Bartlett (Vic)	Kevin Goodman (NSW)	Michael Wilson (Tas)
1979	Carlo Paiolo (NSW)	Darrell Wheeler (NSW)	Steve Thompson (NSW)	Remo Sansonetti (Vic)
1980	Kevin Massard (NSW)	Frank Atkins (NSW)	Fred Hart (NSW)	Robert Hines (NSW)
1981	Chris Crowe (NSW)	Shane Sutton (NSW)	Allan Dutton (NSW)	Gary Brooks (Vic)
1982	Gary Sutton (NSW)	Gary Sutton (NSW)	Brett Williams (NSW)	Graham Seers (NSW)
1983	Shane Sutton (NSW)	Shane Sutton (NSW)	Roger Sumich (NZ)	Roger Sumich (NZ)
1984	Cameron Forge (Vic)	Brian Stephens (NSW)	David Collings (NSW)	Graham Seers (NSW)
1985	Rik Patterson (Vic)	Rik Patterson (Vic)	-
1986	Rodney Price (ACT)	Anthony May (NSW)	-
1987	Stephen Griffiths (NSW)	-	-
1988	Eddy Salas (NSW)	Eddy Salas (NSW)	-
1989	John Cosgrove (GBR)	John Cosgrove (GBR)	-
1990	Ian Garrity (NSW)	Stuart May (NSW)	-
1991	Michael Leahy (Qld)	-	-
1992	Kevin Standen (NSW)	Brett Dutton (NSW)	-
1993	Kevin Nichols (NSW)	Kelvin Martin (NSW)	-
1994	Eddy Salas (NSW)	-	-
Goulburn to Camden
1995	Peter Clayton (NSW)	-	-
1996	Tim Christopher (ACT)	-	-
1997	Scott Farley (NSW)	-	-
1998	Thomas Leaper (Vic)	-	-
1999	Bart Hickson (NSW)	-	-
2000	Baden Burke (NSW)	-	-
2001–2004	-
2005	David McKenzie (Vic)	-	-
2006	Chris Jongewaard (SA)	-	-
2007	Robert Williams	-	-
2008	Will Clarke (Tas)	-	-
2009	Richard Lang (NSW)	-	-
2010	Jonathan Cantwell (Qld)	-	-
2011	Steele Von Hoff (Vic)	-	-
2012	Luke Davison (NSW)	-	-

== Photographs ==
- "1934 Goulburn to Sydney race". Bargo Bicycle User Group.
- "2006 Goulburn to Citi Classic". Cycling NSW. Archived from the original on 4 July 2015.
- "2005 Goulburn to Sydney". Cycling NSW. Archived from the original on 4 July 2015.
- "2007 Goulburn to Citi Classic". Cycling NSW. Archived from the original on 4 July 2015.
- "Goulburn to Citi Cycle Classic – September 13, 2008". Cyclingnews.com.
- "2008 Goulburn to Citi Classic". Cycling NSW. Archived from the original on 4 July 2015.
- "2009 Goulburn to Citi cycling classic". Bargo Bicycle User Group.
