= Jack Fitzgerald (cyclist) =

Australian cyclist (1899–1973)

Personal information
- Full name: Maurice Patrick Fitzgerald
- Nicknames: Jack, Fitzie
- Born: 10 November 1899 Iona, Victoria
- Died: 13 August 1973 (aged 73) Melbourne, Victoria
- Height: 5 ft 8 1/2 in (174 cm)
- Weight: 182 lb (83 kg; 13.0 st)

Cycling career
- Sport: Cycling
- Discipline: Track

Maurice Patrick "Jack" Fitzgerald (10 November 1899 – 13 August 1973) was an Australian Track racing cyclist, particularly in sprint and Six-day racing.

== Career highlights ==
1922
1st Austral Wheel Race
1923
3rd in Sydney Six Days
1925
2nd in Sydney Six Days

1927
1st in Sydney Six Days
1930
Equalled world record for a quarter mile (standing start)
Claimed world record for a quarter mile (flying start)
1932
3rd in Brisbane Six Days

=== Professional career ===
In his first year of racing, 1921 Fitzgerald won the 25 mile road championship of Victoria in 1921 and 1922 although his then bicycle sponsor, Lily Cycles appears to have elevated it to the 25 miles Australasian championship.

The event that shot Fitzgerald to prominence though was the 1922 the Austral Wheel race which Fitzgerald won from scratch. In 1923 he set his best time of 11 4/5 seconds for the final furlong.

Fitzgerald travelled to France in 1924, including racing at the Vélodrome Buffalo and the Parc des Princes. He is reported to have won the Grand Prix d'ete (1000 metres), 1000 Kilometres at Paris with Bob Spears Grand Prix de Monterouge and the Grand Prix d'Etrangers and the last 26 races in which he started.

Fitzgerald was a regular competitor in six day racing. In 1923–24 Fitzgerald, riding with F Wells (NZ), finished 3rd in the Sydney Six Days, at the Sydney Sports Ground. Two years later in 1925–26 he finished 2nd with Dick Marshall in the Sydney Six Days, at the Sydney Sports Ground.. In 1927–28 Fitzgerald won the Sydney Six days with Ken Ross.. In 1932 he finished 3rd in the Brisbane Six Day with Hubert Opperman.

In 1927 Fitzgerald travelled to the United States to compete, riding at Revere Beach, Providence, Hartford, Newark and New York City.

In 1929 Fitzgerald won the National Professional Sprint Championship and the all round championship, with points being scored in races at the Canterbury Velodrome.

Willy Hansen, the world amateur champion and Olympic 1000 meter record holder, and Mat Engel, visited Australia in early 1930. Engel initially defeated Fitzgerald in February 1930 but Fitzgerald triumphed against Hansen and Engel in 3 heats over half a mile.

In 1930 Fitzgerald set an Australian record at the Brisbane Velodrome over a quarter mile, of 28 seconds from a standing start, equalling the then world record held by Victor Johnson. Fitzgerald also set what was claimed as a world record for a quarter mile flying start of 23 seconds. Fitzgerald used a pacing motorcycle to get him up to speed, before riding the quarter mile unpaced. In December 1930 Fitzgerald joined the Massey Bicycle and Sports Depot and was reported to be riding a Superb Bicycle.

By 1932 Fitzgerald appears to have been sponsored by Malvern Star, going on a promotional visit to Townsville with Opperman.

== Coaching career ==
Fitzgerald denied that he ever retired from cycling and continued to compete after World War II, including winning his heat in the 1952 Cartlon Pro wheel race. His continued prominence was, however, as a coach, including cycle coaching by mail. Fitzgerald was the Australian Olympic cycling coach in 1956. Cyclists he was reported to have coached include Russell Mockridge, Lionel Cox, and Neil Percival.

Fitzgerald continued to occasionally race, in 1964 he entered the Austral wheel race and in 1968 accepted a challenge from Nino Borsari for an "old gentleman's race".
