= Tour of Tasmania =

Multi-stage cycling race

The Tour of Tasmania is a cycling road race contested annually in Tasmania, Australia. The modern version formed part of the calendar of the Union Cycliste International from 1997 to 2002. The race was not contested in 2001, 2003 or 2004. It reappeared in 2005, but was not integrated with the UCI Oceania Tour. The 2020 edition was cancelled due to the COVID-19 pandemic. The 2024 edition was postponed until the following year when the race became part of the ProVelo Super League.

There have been several different previously contested races since 1930, antecedents of the current Tour of Tasmania.

== Winners ==
=== Original Tour of Tasmania ===
- 1930 Hubert Opperman
- 1933 Richard Lamb
- 1934 Richard Lamb

=== The Mercury Tour of Tasmania ===
- 1954 Reginald Arnold
- 1955 Ian Greenfield (GBR)
- 1956 Eddie Smith
- 1957 Russell Mockridge
- 1958 Peter Panton
- 1959 Peter Panton
- 1960 John O'Sullivan
- 1961 Ronald Murray
- 1962 Ronald Murray
- 1963 Peter Panton

=== The Examiner Tour of the North ===
- 1954 Colin McKay
- 1955 Neil Geraghty
- 1956 Jim Nevin
- 1957–1959 no contested
- 1960 Colin Hymus
- 1961 Allan Grindal
- 1962 Vic Brown
- 1963 Vic Brown
- 1964 Malcolm Powell
- 1965 Ray Bilney
- 1966 Don Wilson
- 1967 Alf Baker (NZL)
- 1968 Kevin Morgan
- 1969 Kerry Wood
- 1970 Donald Allan
- 1971 Russell Tankard
- 1972 Donald Allan
- 1973 Barry Ulyatt (NZL)
- 1974 Remo Sansonetti
- 1975 Remo Sansonetti
- 1976 Remo Sansonetti
- 1977 Gary Sutton
- 1978 Michael Wilson
- 1979 John Trevorrow
- 1980 Geoff Skaines
- 1981 Murray Hall
- 1982 Wayne Dellar
- 1983 Wayne Hildred
- 1984 Jack Swart (NZL)
- 1985 Michael Lynch
- 1986 Stephen Hodge
- 1987 Barney St. George
- 1988 Kevetoslav Pavlov
- 1989 No contested
- 1990 Brian Fowler (NZL)
- 1991 Grant Rice

=== Current Tour Of Tasmania ===
| Year | Winner | Second | Third | Ref |
|---|---|---|---|---|
| 1996 | Stephen Hodge | Glenn Mitchell (NZL) | Kris Denham | |
| 1997 | Alan Iacuone | Nick Gates | Brendon Vesty (NZL) | |
| 1998 | Cadel Evans | Neil Stephens | Brendon Vesty (NZL) | |
| 1999 | Cadel Evans | Nathan O'Neill | Cameron Hughes | |
| 2000 | Glen Chadwick | Vladimir Karpets (RUS) | Robert Tighello | |
| 2001 | Not contested | | | |
| 2002 | Luke Roberts | Russell Go Hout | Simon Gerrans | |
| 2003–2004 | Not contested | | | |
| 2005 | Shaun Higgerson | Simon Clarke | Gordon McCauley (NZL) | |
| 2006 | Kristian House (GBR) | Kjell Carlström (FIN) | Scott Peoples | |
| 2007 | Cameron Meyer | Travis Meyer | Bernard Sulzberger | |
| 2008 | Richie Porte | William Ford | Jack Bobridge | |
| 2009 | Bernard Sulzberger | Peter McDonald | Luke Durbridge | |
| 2010 | Gordon McCauley (NZL) | George Bennett (NZL) | Rhys Pollock | |
| 2011 | Nathan Haas | Joshua Atkins (NZL) | Cameron Peterson | |
| 2012 | Lachlan Norris | Mark O'Brien | Nathan Earle | |
| 2013 | Jack Haig | Robbie Hucker | Brodie Talbot | |
| 2014 | Patrick Bevin (NZL) | Ben Dyball | Timothy Roe | |
| 2015 | Brad Evans (NZL) | Ben Hill | Dylan Sunderland | |
| 2016 | Ben Dyball | Chris Hamilton | Chris Harper | |
| 2017 | Lionel Mawditt | Angus Lyons | James Whelan | |
| 2018 | Dylan Sunderland | Micheal Vink (NZL) | Cameron Roberts | |
| 2019 | Dylan Sunderland | Chris Harper | Tyler Lindorff | |
| 2020–2021 | Not contested | | | |
| 2022 | Rhys Robotham | Matthew Greenwood | Carter Bettles | |
| 2023 | Matthew Greenwood | Rhys Robotham | (New Zealand) Boris Clark | |

=== Women's Tour Of Tasmania ===
| Year | Winner | Second | Third | Ref |
|---|---|---|---|---|
| 2018 | Justine Barrow | Jaime Gunning | Kirsty McCallum | |
| 2019 | Sarah Gigante | Justine Barrow | Jaime Gunning | |
| 2020 | Not contested | | | |
