= Alby (nickname) =

Alby is a nickname, a pet form of Albert and sometimes of Alban.

== People ==
Notable people with the nickname include:

- Alby Anderson (1894–1980), Australian rules footballer
- Alby Bahr (1881–1962), Australian rules footballer
- Alby Barlow (born 1916), Australian racing cyclist
- Alby Broadby (1917–2012) was an Australian politician
- Alby De Luca (1908–1978), Australian rules footballer
- Alby Dunn (born 1941), former Australian rules footballer
- Alby Falzon (born 1945), Australian surfing filmmaker, photographer and publisher
- Alby Green (1874–1913), Australian rules footballer and first-class cricketer
- Alby Ingleman (1886–1969), Australian rules footballer
- Alby Jacobsen (1902–1989), Australian rules footballer
- Alby James (born 1954), British theatre director
- Alby Linton (1926–2010), Australian rules footballer
- Albert Lowerson (1896–1945), Australian recipient of the Victoria Cross in the First World War
- Alby Mangels (born 1948), Australian adventurer and documentary filmmaker
- Alby Mathewson (born 1985), New Zealand rugby union player
- Alby Morrison (1920–1997), Australian rules footballer
- Alby Murdoch (1935–2010), Australian rules footballer
- Alby Naismith (born 1917), Australian rules footballer
- Alby O'Connor (1893–1944), Australian rules footballer
- Alby Outen (1902–2010), Australian rules footballer
- Alby Palmer (1885–1962), Australian rules footballer
- Alby Pannam (1914–1993), Australian rules footballer
- Alby Roberts (1909–1978), New Zealand cricketer
- Alby Rodda (born 1920), former Australian rules football player
- Alby Saunders (born 1924), Australian racing cyclist
- Alby Schultz (born 1945), Australian politician
- Alby Tame (1877–1965), Australian rules footballer
- Alby Thorne, Australian rugby league footballer in the 1930s and 1940s
- Alby Weiss (1914–1999), Australian rules footballer

== Fictional characters ==
- Alby Grant, in the television show Big Love
- Alby, in the novel The Maze Runner

== See also ==
- Albie (given name)
