= Alby =

Alby may refer to:

== Places ==
- Alby, Botkyrka, a suburb of Stockholm, Sweden
  - Alby metro station
- Alby, Ånge, a locality in Västernorrland County, Sweden
- Alby, Öland, a village in Hulterstad district, Sweden
- Alby, Norfolk, a settlement in Alby with Thwaite, a civil parish in Norfolk, England

== People ==
- Alby (nickname), a list of people with the nickname or given name Alby
- Barbara Alby (1946–2012), American politician
- Henri Alby (1858–1935), French army general

== Fictional characters ==
- Alby Grant, in the television show Big Love
- Alby, in the novel The Maze Runner

== Other uses ==
- Cyclone Alby, which caused widespread damage in Australia in 1978

== See also ==
- Albi (disambiguation)
- Albie (disambiguation)
- Albysjön (disambiguation) (Swedish for "Lake Alby")
