= Albi (disambiguation) =

Albi is a commune in Tarn Department, France.

Albi may also refer to:

== Places ==
=== France ===
- Albi Cathedral, Catholic church building in Albi, France
- Arrondissement of Albi, arrondissement of France in the Tarn department
- Circuit d'Albi, motorsport race track

=== Iran ===
- Albi, Iran, village in East Azerbaijan Province, Iran

=== Italy ===
- Albi, Calabria, commune in the Province of Catanzaro, Italy

=== Romania ===
- Albi, Romania, village in Sibiu County, Romania

=== United States ===
- Joe Albi Stadium, multi purpose stadium in Spokane, Washington
- Albi (restaurant), Michelin-star restaurant in Washington D.C.

== People ==
=== Given name ===
- Albi De Abreu (born 1975), Venezuelan actor
- Albi Alla (born 1993), Albanian footballer
- Albi Çekiçi (born 1992), Albanian footballer
- Albi Doka (born 1997), Albanian footballer
- Albi Dosti (born 1991), Albanian footballer
- Albi Kondi (born 1989), Greek-Albanian footballer
- Albi Llenga (born 1989), Albanian footballer
- Albi Prifti (born 1993), Albanian footballer
- Albi Rosenthal (1914–2004), German-British music scholar and antiquarian bookseller
- Albi Skendi (born 1993), Albanian footballer

=== Surname ===
- Joe Albi (1892–1962), American attorney and civic leader
- José Albi (1922–2010), Spanish poet, literary critic, and translator
- Salvius of Albi (died 584), bishop of Albi

== Sports ==
- ASPTT Albi, French women's football club
- Racing Club Albi XIII, French rugby union club
- SC Albi, French rugby union club
- US Albi, French football club

== Other uses ==
- Council of Albi, a Roman Catholic Council that was held in 1254
- Albi the Racist Dragon, a fictional dragon who is racist against Albanians and subject of a song by New Zealand band Flight of the Conchords
- Albi (company), Germany juice manufacturer

== See also ==
- Albigenses, or "Cathars", a Christian dualist movement of the 12th – 14th century
- Albee (disambiguation)
- ALB (disambiguation)
- Alby (disambiguation)
- Albis (disambiguation)
