= Albis (disambiguation) =

The Albis is a chain of hills in the canton of Zurich, Switzerland.

Albis or Albiş may also refer to:

== Places ==
- Albiș, a village in Buduslău Commune, Bihor County, Romania
- Albiș, a village in Cernat Commune, Covasna County, Romania
- Albiș River, Romania
- Albis, the Latin name of the river Elbe

== Other uses ==
- Albis (store), a Japanese supermarket company
- Albis (ship, 1997), a passenger ship operating on Lake Zurich in Switzerland

== See also ==
- Albes, a surname
- Albi (disambiguation)
- Albus (disambiguation)
