= Albie =

Albie may refer to:

- Albie (given name)
- Albie (TV series), British animated series
- Short for Albanerpetontid, a prehistoric amphibian

== See also ==
- Alby (disambiguation)
