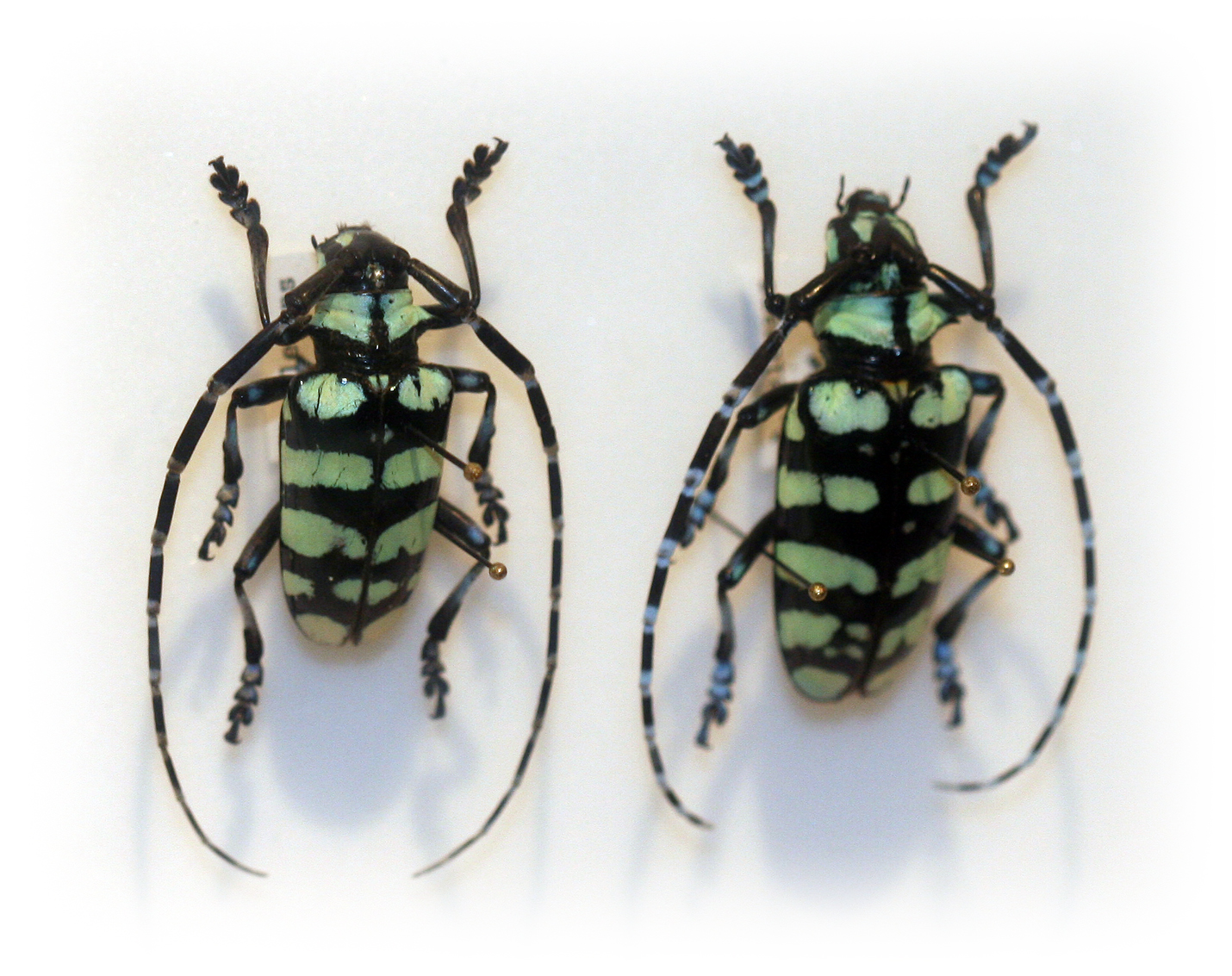

Scientific classification
- Domain: Eukaryota
- Kingdom: Animalia
- Phylum: Arthropoda
- Class: Insecta
- Order: Coleoptera
- Suborder: Polyphaga
- Infraorder: Cucujiformia
- Family: Cerambycidae
- Tribe: Lamiini
- Genus: Anoplophora
- Species: A. elegans

Binomial name
- Anoplophora elegans (Gahan, 1888)

Subspecies
- Anoplophora (Cyriocrates) elegans albonotata; Anoplophora (Cyriocrates) elegans macrospila; Anoplophora (Cyriocrates) elegans superba

Synonyms
- Anoplophora (cyriocrates) elegans; Cyriocrates elegans Gahan, 1888; Melanauster macrospilus; Melanauster superbus

= Anoplophora elegans =

Species of beetle

Anoplophora elegans is a species of beetles in the longhorn beetle family (Cerambycidae). It was described by Charles Joseph Gahan from the Mine District in Upper Burma (Myanmar). It is distributed in Southeast and East Asia (China, Laos, Myanmar, Thailand, Vietnam).

Anoplophora elegans measure 28–38 mm (1.1–1.5 in).
