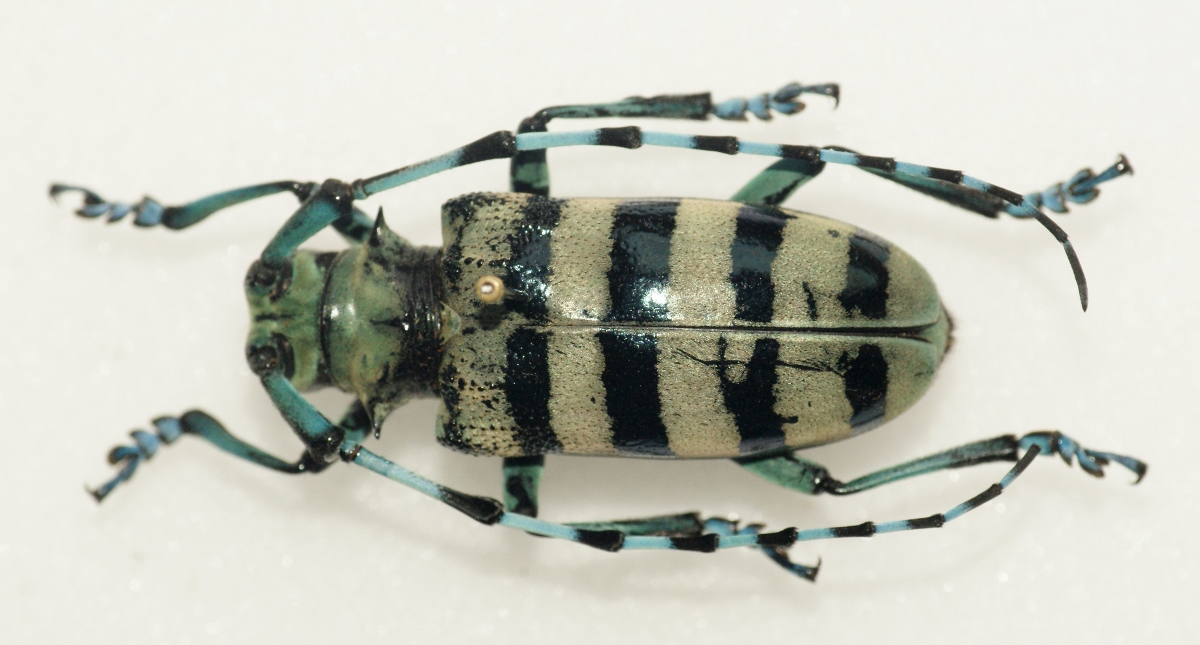

Scientific classification
- Kingdom: Animalia
- Phylum: Arthropoda
- Class: Insecta
- Order: Coleoptera
- Suborder: Polyphaga
- Infraorder: Cucujiformia
- Family: Cerambycidae
- Genus: Anoplophora
- Species: A. medenbachii

Binomial name
- Anoplophora medenbachii (Ritsema, 1881)

Synonyms
- Anoplophora medenbachii sumatrensis Fisher, 1934; Anoplophora medembachi Breuning, 1944 (Lapsus calami)

= Anoplophora medenbachii =

Species of beetles

Anoplophora medenbachii (often misspelled medembachi) is a species of beetles in the family Cerambycidae. It is distributed in Southeast Asia (Borneo, Sumatra, Malaysia, Thailand).
