= Anoplophora imitator =

Scientific classification
- Domain: Eukaryota
- Kingdom: Animalia
- Phylum: Arthropoda
- Class: Insecta
- Order: Coleoptera
- Suborder: Polyphaga
- Infraorder: Cucujiformia
- Family: Cerambycidae
- Tribe: Lamiini
- Genus: Anoplophora
- Species: A. imitator

Binomial name
- Anoplophora imitator (White, 1858)

Synonyms
- Cerosterna imitator White, 1858; Melanauster Pirouletii Fairmaire 1889; Anoplophora imitatrix Breuning 1961 (Missp.)

Species of beetle

Anoplophora imitator is a species of beetle in the family Cerambycidae. It is distributed in China.
