= ALB =

An Alb is a liturgical vestment.

ALB, Alb or alb may also refer to:

== Organizations ==
- Animal Liberation Brigade
- Alpha Baltic–Maratoni.lv, a Latvian cycling team
- Arm's-length body, a type of quango (quasi-autonomous non-governmental organization), or public body in the UK
- Albemarle Corporation (NYSE symbol ALB)

== People ==
- ALB (musician), a French musician Clément Daquin
- Johannes Baptista von Albertini (1769–1831), German botanist and mycologist (taxonomic author abbreviation "Alb.")

== Places ==
=== In Germany ===
- Alb (Upper Rhine), a tributary of the Upper Rhine in northern Black Forest near Eggenstein-Leopoldshafen, Germany
- Alb (High Rhine), a tributary of the High Rhine in southern Black Forest at the headwaters of Albbruck Menze Schwander, Germany
- Franconian Jura (Fränkische Alb), an upland in Bavaria, Germany
- Swabian Jura (Schwäbische Alb), a mountain range in Baden-Württemberg, Germany

=== Elsewhere ===
- Crișul Alb (river), in western Romania
- Albania (ISO 3166-1 alpha-3 and UNDP country code "ALB")
  - Albanian language (ISO 639-2 language code "alb")
- Albany International Airport, by IATA code
- Albany-Rensselaer (Amtrak station), a train station in Albany, New York
- Albion railway station, Melbourne
- Albrighton railway station (National Rail code) in Shropshire, England

== Science and technology ==
- Amazon AWS's Application Load Balancer
- The ALB gene, which encodes serum albumin in humans
- Honda anti-lock braking system
- The Asian long-horned beetle (Anoplophora glabripennis)
- Human serum albumin, encoded by the ALB gene
- Johannes Baptista von Albertini (1769–1831), German botanist and mycologist (taxonomic author abbreviation "Alb.")

== Other uses ==
- Albanian language (ISO 639-2 language code "alb")
- All-weather lifeboat (as opposed to inshore lifeboat, or ILB), such as the:
  - Mersey class lifeboat, all-weather lifeboats operated by the Royal National Lifeboat Institution (RNLI)
  - Severn class lifeboat, the largest all-weather lifeboat in use by the RNLI
  - Tamar class lifeboat, the latest replacement of the previous Tyne class lifeboats
- Arm's-length body, a type of quango (quasi-autonomous non-governmental organization), or public body in the UK
- Alm (pasture), Alpine transhumance, or "alb" in Allemannic German
