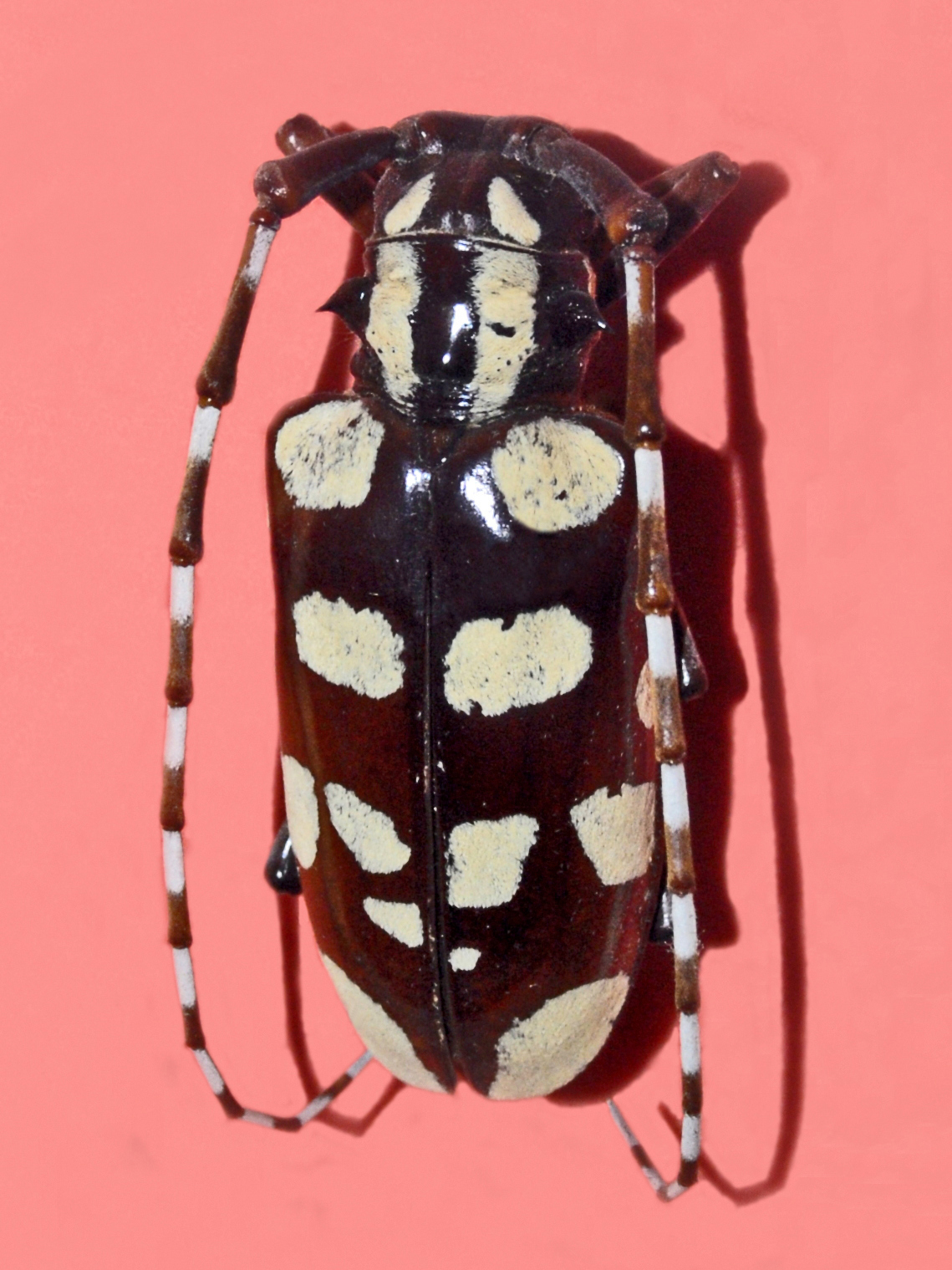
- Museum specimen of Anoplophora horsfieldii

Scientific classification
- Domain: Eukaryota
- Kingdom: Animalia
- Phylum: Arthropoda
- Class: Insecta
- Order: Coleoptera
- Suborder: Polyphaga
- Infraorder: Cucujiformia
- Family: Cerambycidae
- Tribe: Lamiini
- Genus: Anoplophora
- Species: A. horsfieldii

Binomial name
- Anoplophora horsfieldii (Hope, 1842)

Synonyms
- Anoplophora nigrofasciatus Breuning, 1961; Anoplophora nigrofasciatus m. quadrifasciatus Breuning, 1961; Cerosterna horsfieldi var. voluptuosa (Thomson) Thomson, 1857; Cerosterna voluptuosa Thomson, 1856; Cyriocrates horsfieldi (Hope) Thomson, 1868; Cyriocrates nigrotrifasciatus Pic, 1953; Cyriocrates nigrotrifasciatus var. 4-fasciata Pic, 1953; Oplophora horsfieldi Hope, 1842

= Anoplophora horsfieldii =

Species of beetle

Anoplophora horsfieldii is a species of beetles in the longhorn beetle family (Cerambycidae).

== Subspecies ==
- Anoplophora horsfieldii horsfieldii (Hope, 1842)
- Anoplophora horsfieldii tonkinensis (Kriesche, 1924)

== Description ==
Anoplophora horsfieldii can reach a length of about 35 mm. These beetles are black or dark brown, with large irregular pale yellow transversal bands on the elytra, pale yellow markings on the head and the pronotum and very long antennae. Main host plants are Camellia sinensis, Celtis sinensis, Quercus glauca and Ulmus pumila.

== Distribution ==
This species can be found in Thailand, Vietnam, China and Taiwan.

== Etymology ==
The name honours Thomas Horsfield.
