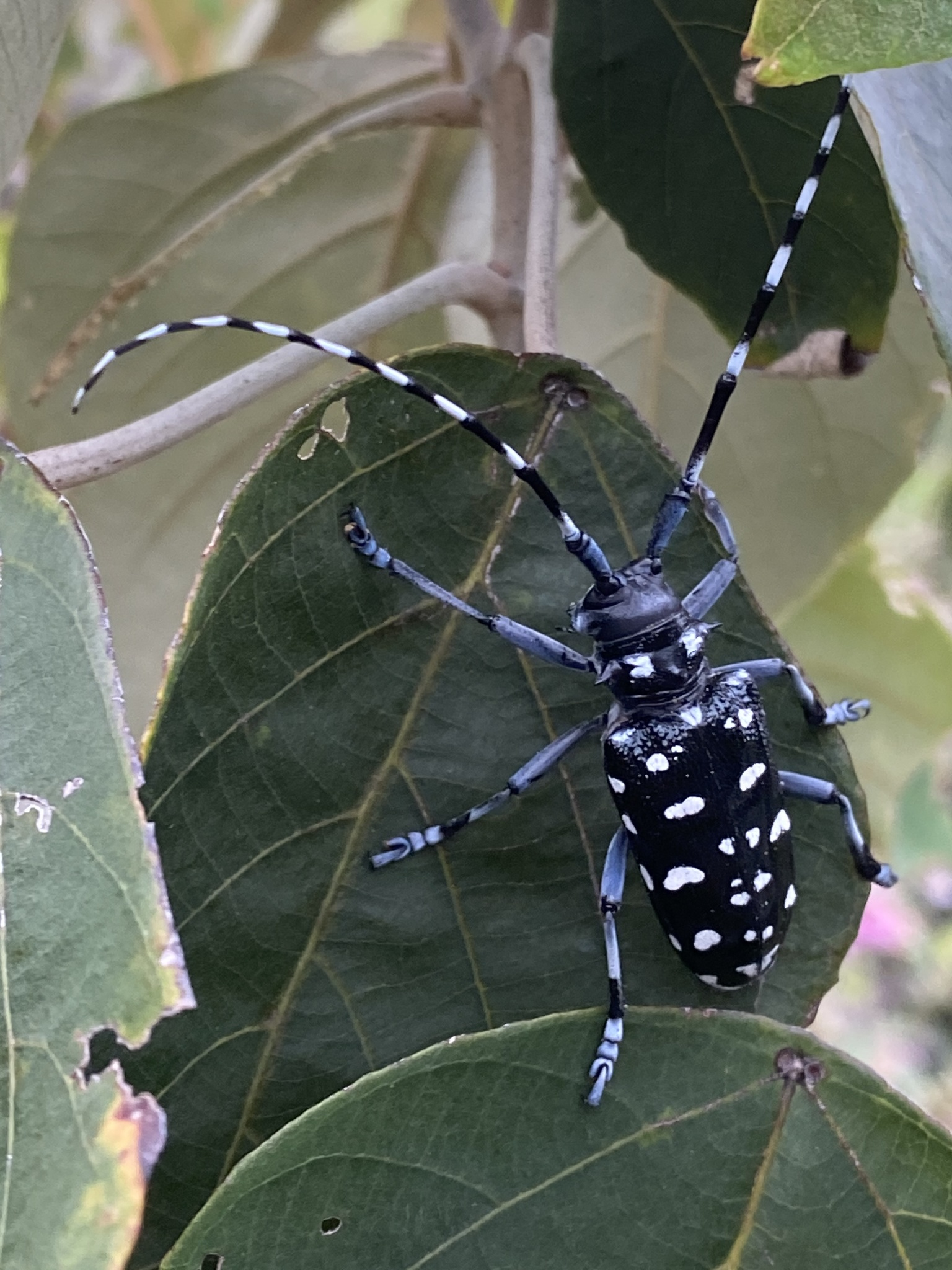

Scientific classification
- Domain: Eukaryota
- Kingdom: Animalia
- Phylum: Arthropoda
- Class: Insecta
- Order: Coleoptera
- Suborder: Polyphaga
- Infraorder: Cucujiformia
- Family: Cerambycidae
- Tribe: Lamiini
- Genus: Anoplophora
- Species: A. macularia

Binomial name
- Anoplophora macularia Thompson, 1865

= Anoplophora macularia =

Species of beetle

Anoplophora macularia is a species of long-horn beetle found throughout East Asia.

== Description ==
Av macularia is black in color, with white or yellow spots on the integument.

== Distribution ==
Anoplophora macularia is found in China, Taiwan, and Japan.

== In agriculture ==
Anoplophora macularia are regarded as major pests in East Asia, where they regularly attack tropical and subtropical fruits and nuts, particularly citrus trees. The larvae of the species bore into tree trunks through egg-laying scars, destroying the phloem and xylem as they develop. The process results in the deterioration or even death of the host tree, resulting in extensive economic losses. As a result, A. macularia is the subject of pesticide usage.
