= Albee =

Albee may refer to:

== Places ==
- Albee, California, U.S., also known as Albeeville
- Albee, South Dakota, U.S.
- Albee Township, Michigan, U.S.

== Other uses ==
- Albee (surname)
- Albee Benitez (Alfredo Abelardo Bantug Benitez, born 1966), a Filipino businessman and politician
- 10051 Albee, an asteroid
