= Albee (surname) =

Albee is a surname, notably of Edward Albee (Edward Franklin Albee III, 1928–2016), an American playwright.

Other notable people with the surname include:

- Becca Albee, American musician and visual artist
- Earle Albee (1898–1963), American politician
- Edward Albee (1928–2016), American playwright
- Edward Franklin Albee II (1857–1930), American showman
- Fred H. Albee (1876–1945), American surgeon
- George Albee (1921–2006), American clinical psychologist
- George E. Albee (1845–1918), United States Army officer
- Grace Albee (1890–1985), American printmaker and wood engraver
- Harriet Ryan Albee (1829–1873), American social reformer and philanthropist
- Josh Albee (born 1959), American actor
- Persis Foster Eames Albee (1836–1914), American businessperson and entrepreneur
- Reed A. Albee (1885–1961), American businessman
- H. Russell Albee (1867–1950), mayor of Portland, Oregon, U.S.
- Spencer Albee (born 1976), American musician
- Wayne Albee (1882–1937), American pictorialist photographer
