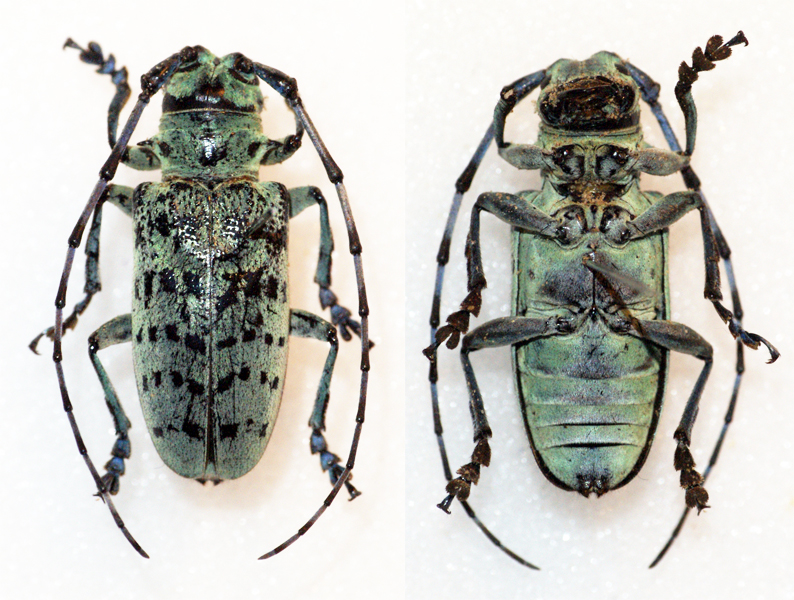

Scientific classification
- Kingdom: Animalia
- Phylum: Arthropoda
- Class: Insecta
- Order: Coleoptera
- Suborder: Polyphaga
- Infraorder: Cucujiformia
- Family: Cerambycidae
- Genus: Anoplophora
- Species: A. beryllina

Binomial name
- Anoplophora beryllina Hope, 1840

Synonyms
- Anoplophora melanostictus White, 1857; Anoplophora argentifer Pic, 1902; Anoplophora subberyllina Breuning, 1965

= Anoplophora beryllina =

Species of beetle

Anoplophora beryllina is a species of beetle in the family Cerambycidae which lives in China, Myanmar, India, Laos and Vietnam.
