= Anoplophora quadrifasciata =

Scientific classification
- Kingdom: Animalia
- Phylum: Arthropoda
- Class: Insecta
- Order: Coleoptera
- Suborder: Polyphaga
- Infraorder: Cucujiformia
- Family: Cerambycidae
- Genus: Anoplophora
- Species: A. quadrifasciata

Binomial name
- Anoplophora quadrifasciata (Breuning, 1961)

Synonyms
- Mimonemophas quadrifasciatus Breuning, 1961

Species of beetle

Anoplophora quadrifasciata is a species of beetle in the family Cerambycidae. It was described by Stephan von Breuning in 1961.
