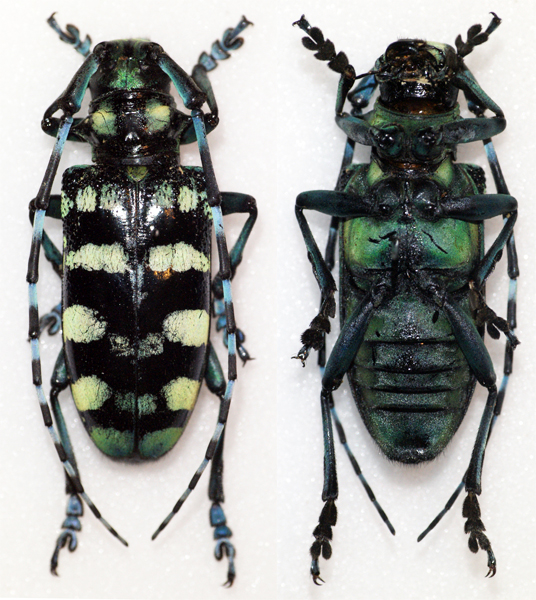

Scientific classification
- Kingdom: Animalia
- Phylum: Arthropoda
- Class: Insecta
- Order: Coleoptera
- Suborder: Polyphaga
- Infraorder: Cucujiformia
- Family: Cerambycidae
- Genus: Anoplophora
- Species: A. zonator

Binomial name
- Anoplophora zonator (Thomson, 1878)

Synonyms
- Cyriocrates Zonator Thomson, 1878; Melanauster fasciatus Pic, 1925; Anoplophora zonatrix Breuning 1944 (Missp.); Anoplophora zonatrix major Breuning, 1968

= Anoplophora zonator =

Species of beetle

Anoplophora zonator is a species of beetle in the family Cerambycidae. It is distributed in Borneo, Malaysia, Thailand, Laos, and Myanmar.
