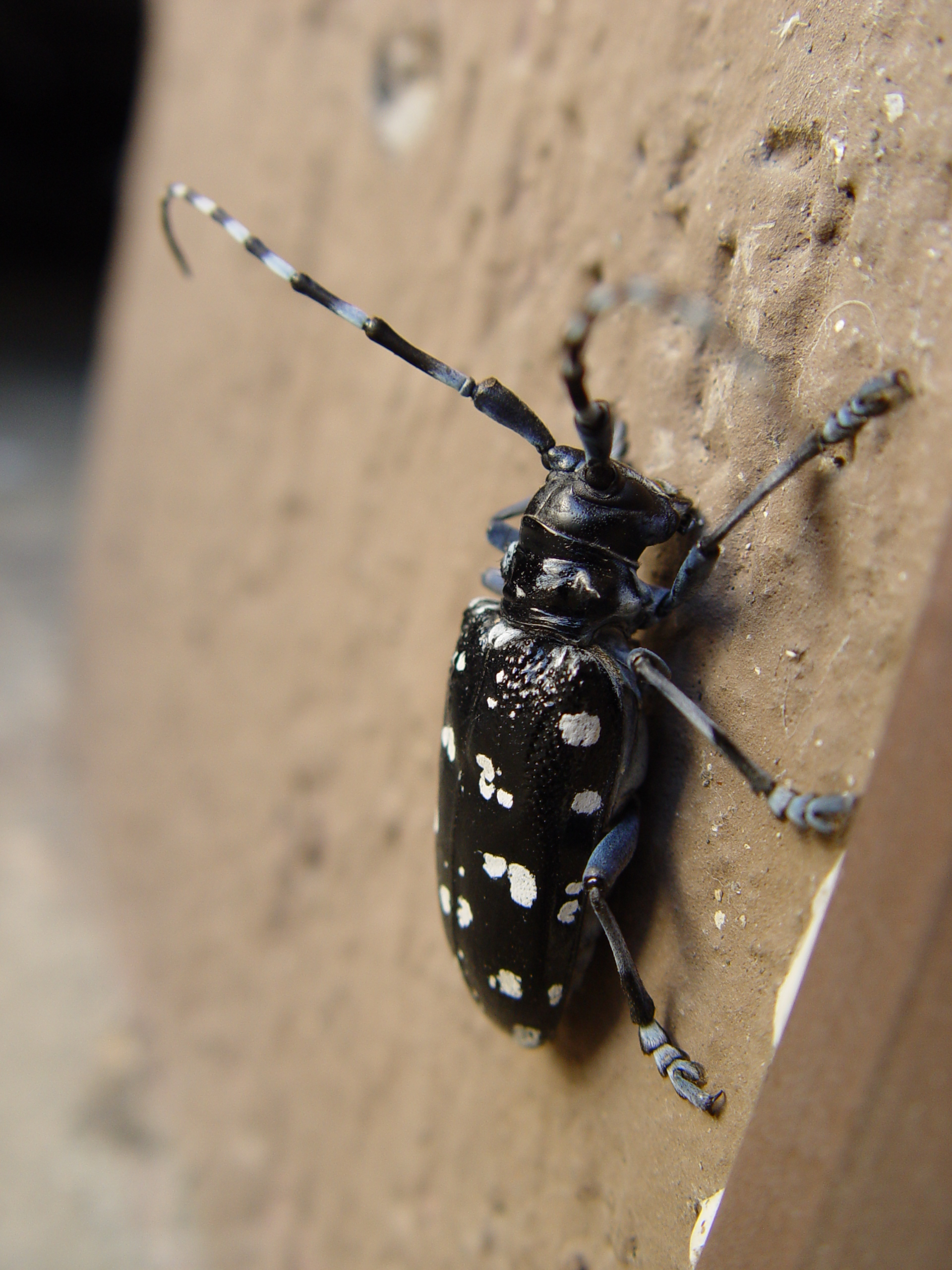
- Anoplophora chinensis

Scientific classification
- Kingdom: Animalia
- Phylum: Arthropoda
- Clade: Pancrustacea
- Class: Insecta
- Order: Coleoptera
- Suborder: Polyphaga
- Infraorder: Cucujiformia
- Family: Cerambycidae
- Tribe: Lamiini
- Genus: Anoplophora; Hope, 1839

Species
- see text

Synonyms
- Oplophora Hope, 1839; Calloplophora Thomson, 1864; Melanauster Thomson, 1868; Cyriocrates Thomson, 1868; Micromelanauster Pic, 1931; Falsocyriocrates Pic, 1953; Mimonemophas Breuning, 1961

= Anoplophora =

Genus of beetles

Anoplophora is a genus of beetles in the longhorn beetle family (Cerambycidae). They are native to Asia. Most are large and colorful and thus are depicted in artwork and sought after by beetle collectors. The genus also includes several notorious pest insects.

== Description ==
Beetles of Anoplophora are 1 to 5 centimeters in length. They are spotted or banded with a range of color patterns in shades of yellow, blue, purple, and white. They have very long antennae. One characteristic that is particularly useful for distinguishing the species from one another is the structure of the male genitalia.

== Impacts ==
Several Anoplophora species are major pests of urban, ornamental, and agricultural trees.

The Asian long-horned beetle (A. glabripennis) is native to China and Korea, and it is now widespread in Europe as an introduced species. Populations of this beetle have been detected in some locations in North America, including Toronto, Chicago, New Jersey, Ohio, Massachusetts, and New York City, and have either been declared eradicated, or are currently being dealt with under an eradication program. Many tree species can serve as hosts to the beetle, but it especially favors maples.

The citrus long-horned beetle (A. chinensis; syn. A. malasiaca) has been introduced from Asia to Europe and North America. It is a pest of citrus and other fruit and nut trees. It infests forest trees and ornamentals. It attacks over 100 species of trees, shrubs, and herbs from many plant families. Damage from its wood-boring larvae can kill trees.

== Diversity ==
In a 2002 revision of the genus, 36 species were recognized. At least nine more species have been described since then, and additional revisionary work has subsumed several other genera into Anoplophora, so it includes over 50 species at present.

== Genomics ==
Chromosome-level genome assemblies for species in the genus Anoplophora were published in 2026, including Anoplophora glabripennis and Anoplophora malasiaca. The genome sizes are approximately 708–730 Mb, with over 95% of each assembly anchored to 10 and 15 chromosomes, respectively. The assemblies have BUSCO completeness scores above 99%, and approximately 23,000–23,500 protein-coding genes were predicted.

== Species ==
- Anoplophora albopicta (Matsushita, 1933)
- Anoplophora amoena (Jordan, 1895)
- Anoplophora ankangensis (Chiang, 1981)
- Anoplophora asuanga Schultze, 1923
- Anoplophora beryllina (Hope, 1840)
- Anoplophora birmanica Huedepohl, 1990
- Anoplophora bowringii (White, 1858)
- Anoplophora cheni Bi & Ohbayashi, 2015
- Anoplophora chiangi Hua & Zhang, 1991
- Anoplophora chinensis (Forster, 1771)
- Anoplophora coeruleoantennata (Breuning, 1946)
- Anoplophora davidis (Fairmaire, 1886)
- Anoplophora decemmaculata Pu, 1999
- Anoplophora elegans (Gahan, 1888)
- Anoplophora fanjingensis Yang, Yang & Tian, 2020
- Anoplophora flavomaculata (Gressitt, 1935)
- Anoplophora freyi (Breuning, 1946)
- Anoplophora fruhstorferi (Aurivillius, 1902)
- Anoplophora glabripennis (Motschulsky, 1854)
- Anoplophora graafi (Ritsema, 1880)
- Anoplophora granata Holzschuh, 1993
- Anoplophora gressitti Ohbayashi & Bi, 2014
- Anoplophora horsfieldii (Hope, 1842)
- Anoplophora huangjianbini Wang & He, 2021
- Anoplophora imitator (White, 1858)
- Anoplophora irregularis (Aurivillius, 1924)
- Anoplophora jianfenglingensis Hua, 1989
- Anoplophora leechi (Gahan, 1888)
- Anoplophora longehirsuta Breuning, 1968
- Anoplophora lucipor Newman, 1842
- Anoplophora lurida (Pascoe, 1857)
- Anoplophora macularia (Thomson, 1865)
- Anoplophora mamaua Schultze, 1923
- Anoplophora medenbachii (Ritsema, 1881)
- Anoplophora multimaculata (Xie & Wang, 2015)
- Anoplophora ogasawaraensis Makihara, 1976
- Anoplophora oshimana (Fairmaire, 1895)
- Anoplophora puxian Wang & He, 2021
- Anoplophora quadrifasciata (Breuning, 1961)
- Anoplophora rubidacorpora Xie, Shi & Wang, 2015
- Anoplophora ryukyuensis Breuning & Ohbayashi, 1964
- Anoplophora sebastieni Duranton, 2004
- Anoplophora siderea Bi, Chen & Ohbayashi, 2020
- Anoplophora similis (Gahan, 1900)
- Anoplophora sollii (Hope, 1840)
- Anoplophora stanleyana Hope, 1840
- Anoplophora tianaca Schultze, 1923
- Anoplophora tonkinea (Pic, 1907)
- Anoplophora viriantennata Wang & Chiang, 1998
- Anoplophora wusheana Chang, 1960
- Anoplophora zonator (Thomson, 1878)
