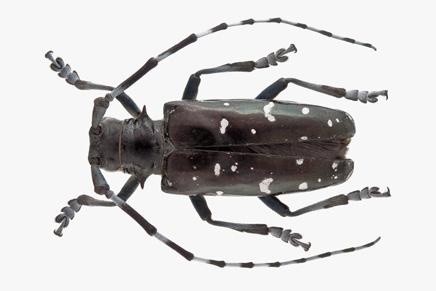

Scientific classification
- Kingdom: Animalia
- Phylum: Arthropoda
- Clade: Pancrustacea
- Class: Insecta
- Order: Coleoptera
- Suborder: Polyphaga
- Infraorder: Cucujiformia
- Family: Cerambycidae
- Genus: Anoplophora
- Species: A. glabripennis

Binomial name
- Anoplophora glabripennis (Motschulsky, 1853)

Synonyms
- Cerosterna glabripennis Motschulsky, 1853; Cerosterna laevigator Thomson, 1857; Melanauster nobilis Ganglbauer, 1890; Melanauster luteonotatus Pic, 1925; Melanauster angustatus Pic, 1925; Melanauster nankineus Pic, 1926; Melanauster laglaisei Pic, 1953

= Asian long-horned beetle =

Species of beetle

The Asian long-horned beetle (Anoplophora glabripennis), also known as the starry sky, sky beetle, or ALB, is native to the Korean Peninsula, northern and southern China, and disputably in northern Japan. This species has now been accidentally introduced into the eastern United States, where it was first discovered in 1996, as well as Canada, and several countries in Europe, including Austria, France, Germany, Italy and UK.

== Taxonomy and description ==
Common names for Anoplophora glabripennis in Asia are the starry sky beetle, basicosta white-spotted longicorn beetle, or smooth shoulder-longicorn, and it is called the Asian long-horned beetle (ALB) in North America.

Adults are very large insects with bodies ranging from 1.7 to 3.9 cm (0.67 to 1.54 in) in length and antennae which can be as long as 4 cm (1.6 in) or 1.5–2 times longer than the body of the insect. They are shiny black with about 20 white spots on each wing cover and long antennae conspicuously banded black and white. These beetles can fly, but generally only for short distances, which is a common limitation for Cerambycidae of their size and weight. The upper sections of the legs of the adults are whitish-blue. A. glabripennis can be distinguished from related species by the markings on the wing covers and the pattern of the antennae.

== Range, habitat, and hosts ==
The Asian long-horned beetle is native to eastern Asia, primarily in eastern China and Korea. This species was known from Japan in the mid-1800s, but may or may not be native there. It is invasive outside its native range.

In its native range, Anoplophora glabripennis primarily infests plants like maple, poplar, willow, and elm trees. In the United States, A. glabripennis has completed development on species of these genera and also Aesculus, Albizia, birch, katsura, ash, planes, and Sorbus. In Canada, complete development has been confirmed only on maple, birch, poplar, and willow, although oviposition has occurred on other tree genera. Maple is the most commonly infested tree genus in North America, followed by elm and willow. In Europe, complete development has been recorded on maple, Aesculus, alder, birch, hornbeam, beech, ash, platanus, poplar, Prunus, willow, and Sorbus. The top five host genera infested in Europe, in decreasing order, are maple, birch, willow, Aesculus, and poplar. Not all poplar species are equally susceptible to attack. Other economically important trees attacked include apple (Malus domestica), mulberry (Morus alba), stone fruits (Prunus spp.), pear (Pyrus spp.), and black locust (Robinia pseudoacacia).

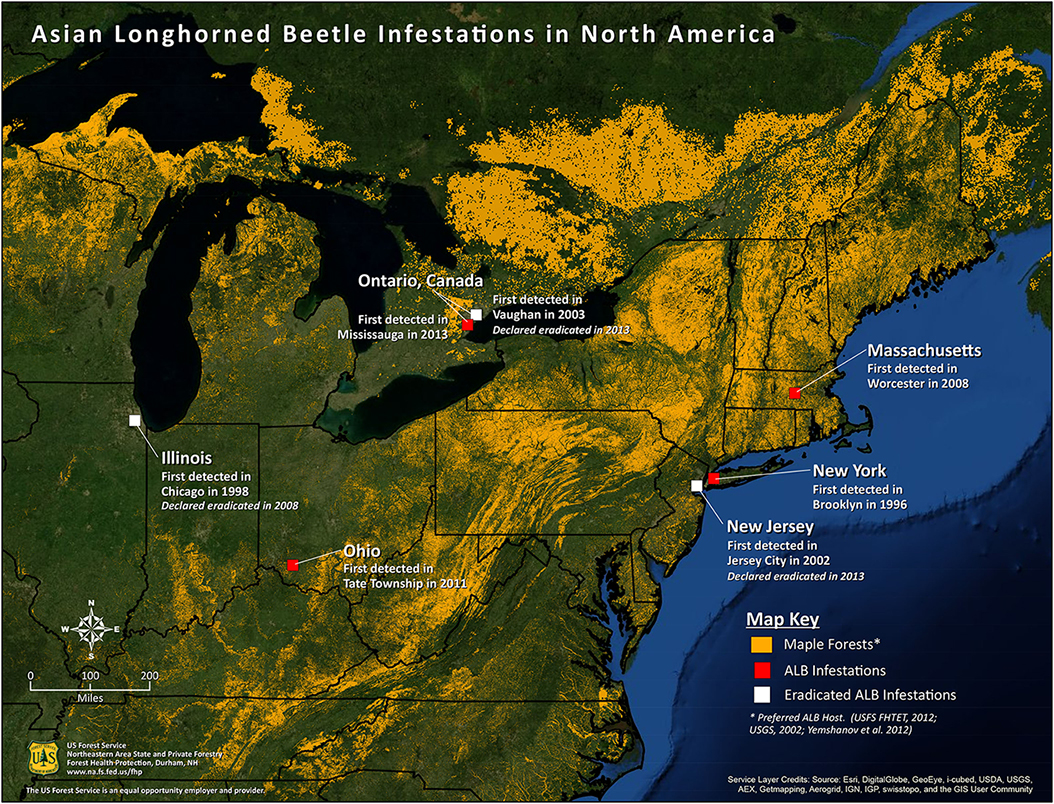
First detections of Asian long-horned beetle in North America as of July 2, 2015

In North America, established populations were first discovered in August 1996 in Brooklyn, New York and has since been found in other areas of New York, New Jersey, Massachusetts, Illinois, Ohio, and Ontario in Canada. However, it has also been eradicated from some regions within these states and provinces. The first confirmed detection in South Carolina was June 4, 2020, at a residence in Hollywood, Charleston County. As a result both Clemson University's State Crop Pest Commission (which regulates crop pests for the state government) and the federal APHIS declared a quarantine.

In Europe, established populations have been found in Austria (in Braunau am Inn in 2001), Belgium, France, Germany, Italy, Switzerland, and the United Kingdom, though the beetle had also been intercepted in areas through inspection of international trade goods such as wood packaging. In January 2021 Austria was declared free of them after 4 years (2 life cycles) of no detections in Gallspach, the last Austrian infestation.

== Life cycles ==
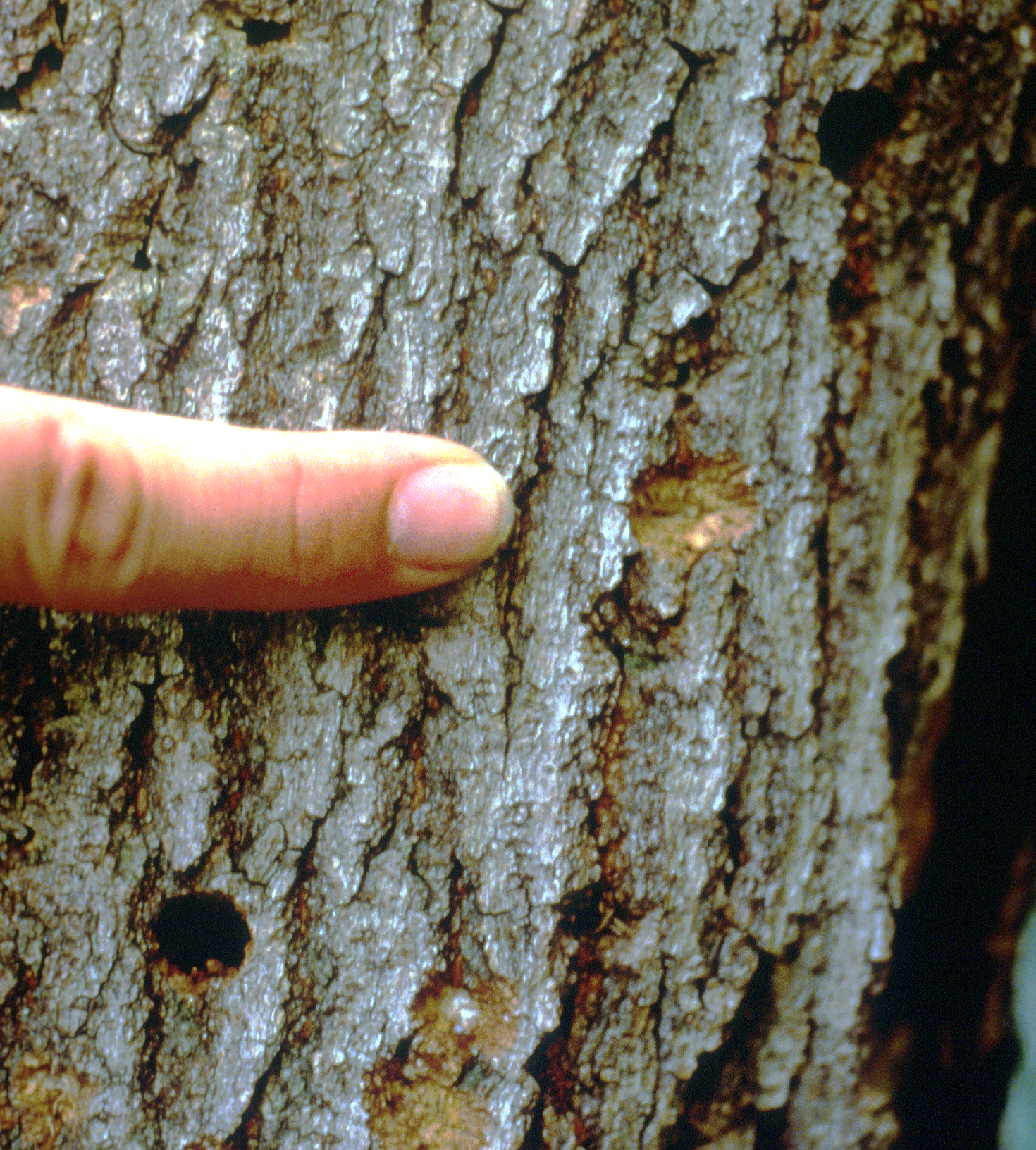
Egg-laying site chewed by the female Asian long-horned beetle.

Adult females lay 45–62 eggs in their lifetime by chewing a small pit through the bark of the host tree to the cambium and lay one 5–7 mm (0.20–0.28 in) long egg underneath the bark in each pit. Eggs hatch in 13–54 days depending on temperature. Eggs that have not developed enough, such as those laid in late summer or early fall, will overwinter and hatch the following season.

Larvae are cylindrical and elongate and can be 50 mm (2.0 in) long and 5.4 mm (0.21 in) wide. Larvae first create a feeding gallery in the cambial region, but more mature larvae tunnel to the heartwood as they feed. Larvae go through at least five instars over 1–2 years; which can vary due to host or temperature conditions. Larvae expel frass from their tunnels near the original oviposition site. A larva can consume up to 1,000 cubic cm of wood in its lifetime. Asian long-horned beetle larvae do not pupate before they reach a critical weight, so additional larval instars can occur.

Pupation usually occurs in spring at the end of the larval tunnel in the sapwood, eclosion occurs 12–50 days later, and adults will chew out of the tree approximately one week after eclosion. Adults feed on leaf petioles and can chew through bark on small branches to feed on the vascular cambium. Eggs, larvae or as pupae can overwinter within the tree. In their overwintering phase, pupae are inactive, and development does not occur. They resume their life cycle when temperatures are above 10 °C (50 °F).

Upon emergence, adult females can copulate, although an obligatory maturation period is required for feeding after emergence for ovarian maturation. Laboratory studies have estimated the female maturation period lasts 9–15 days. Adult males have mature spermatozoa before emergence, and feeding is necessary only to sustain their normal activity. Adults typically lay eggs on the plant they developed on during immature stages rather than colonizing new plants unless population density is high or the host plant is dead. However, when they do disperse, they can travel up to approximately 2.5 km (1.6 mi) from their host tree in a growing season in search of new hosts, although in a mark-recapture experiment about 98% of adults were recaptured within 1 km (0.62 mi) of their release point. Adults will typically infest the crown and main branches first and will begin to infest the trunk as the crown dies. Adult longevity and fecundity are influenced by conditions such as the larval host plant and temperature. Laboratory reared males and females can live up to 202 and 158 days, respectively.

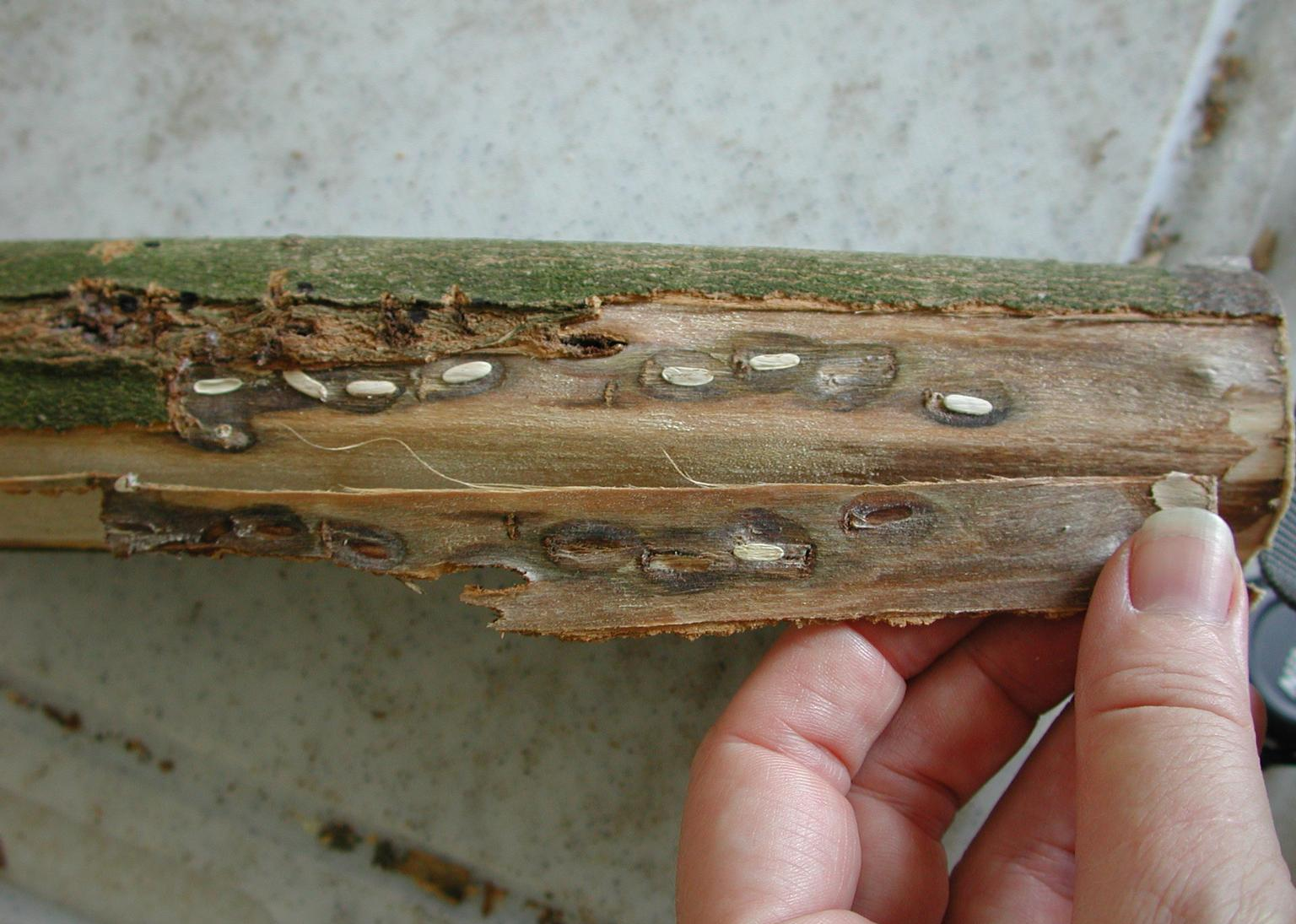
Eggs within pits with the bark removed.

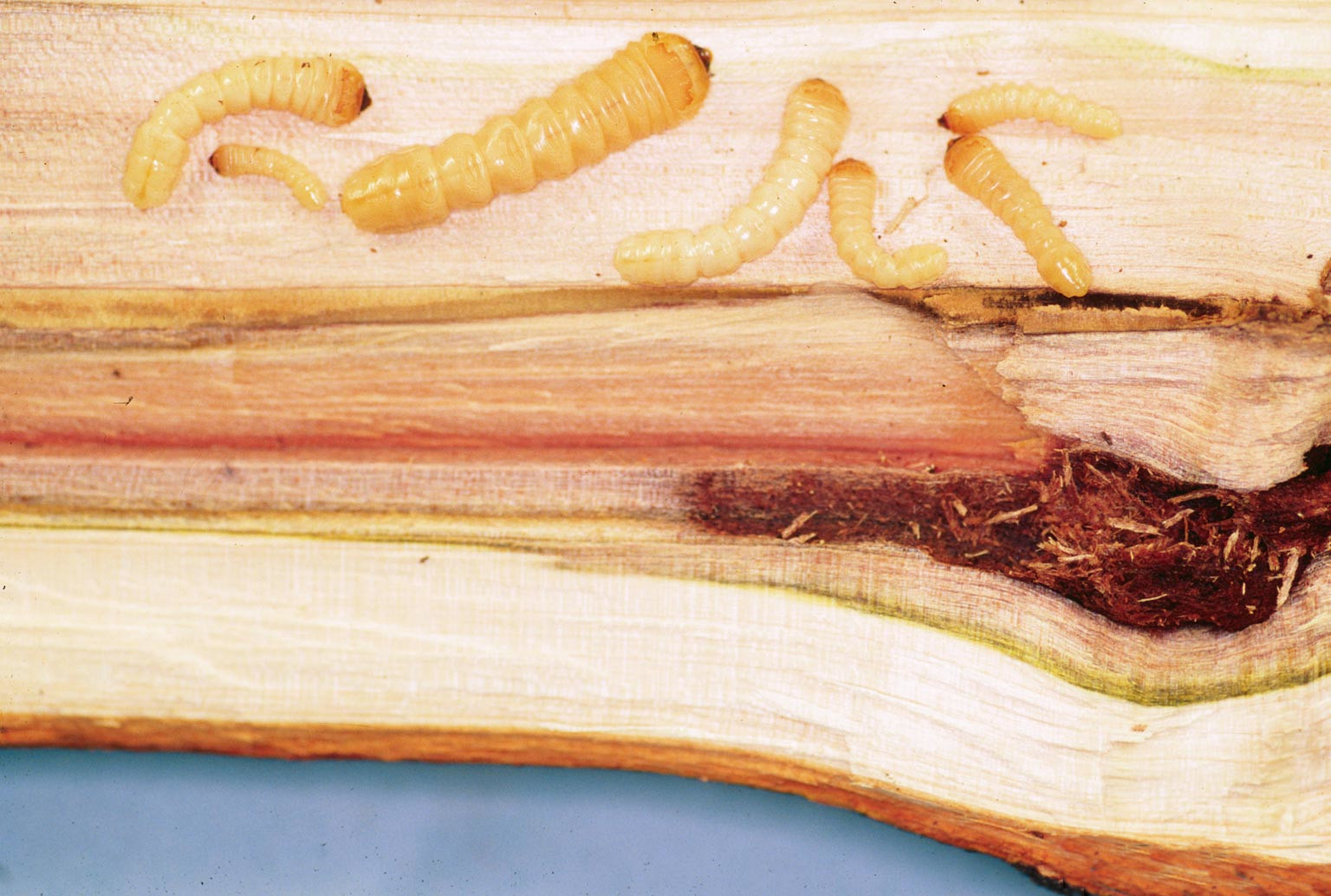
Multiple instars removed from gallery.

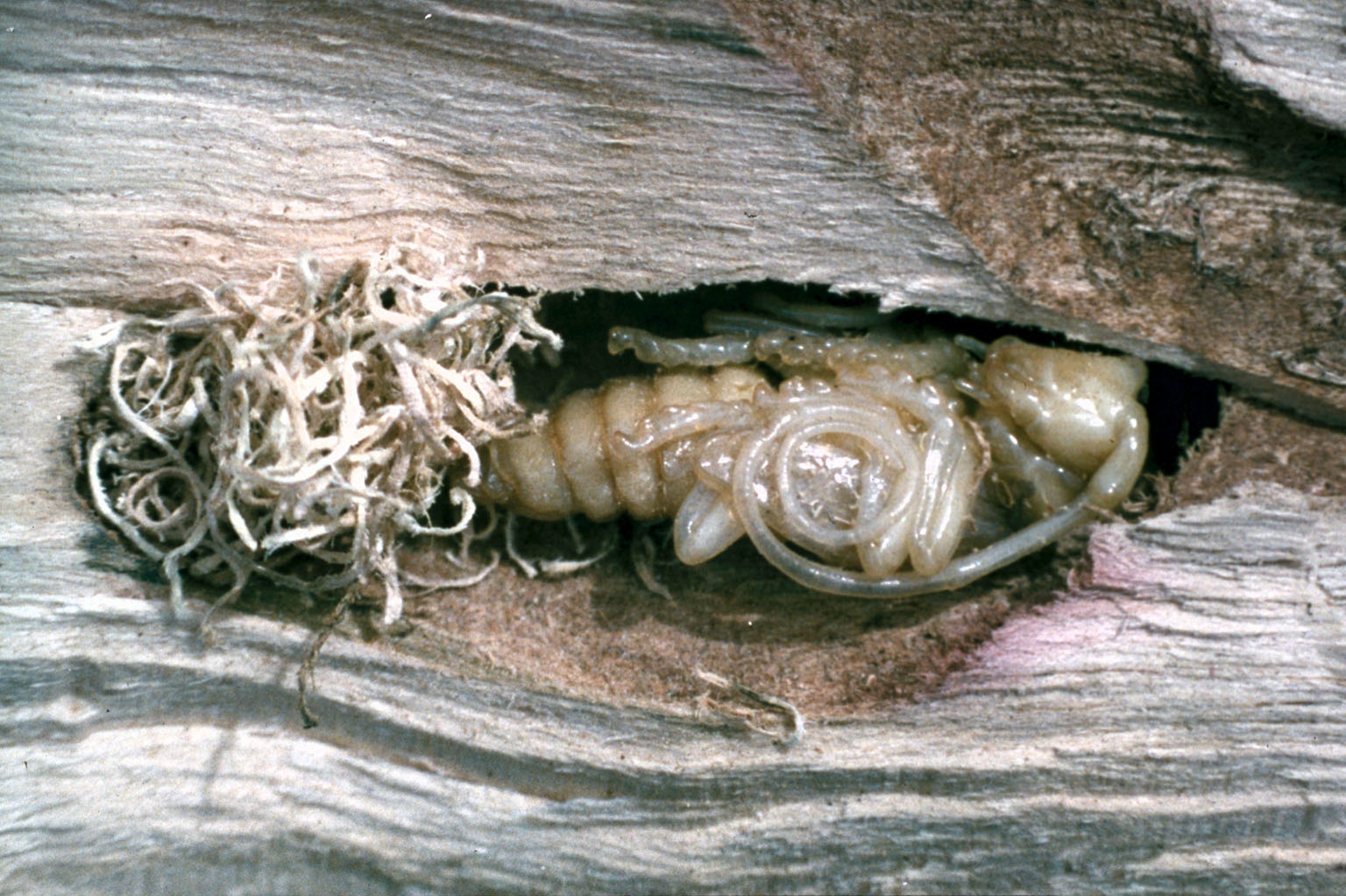
Pupa within its pupal chamber with frass.

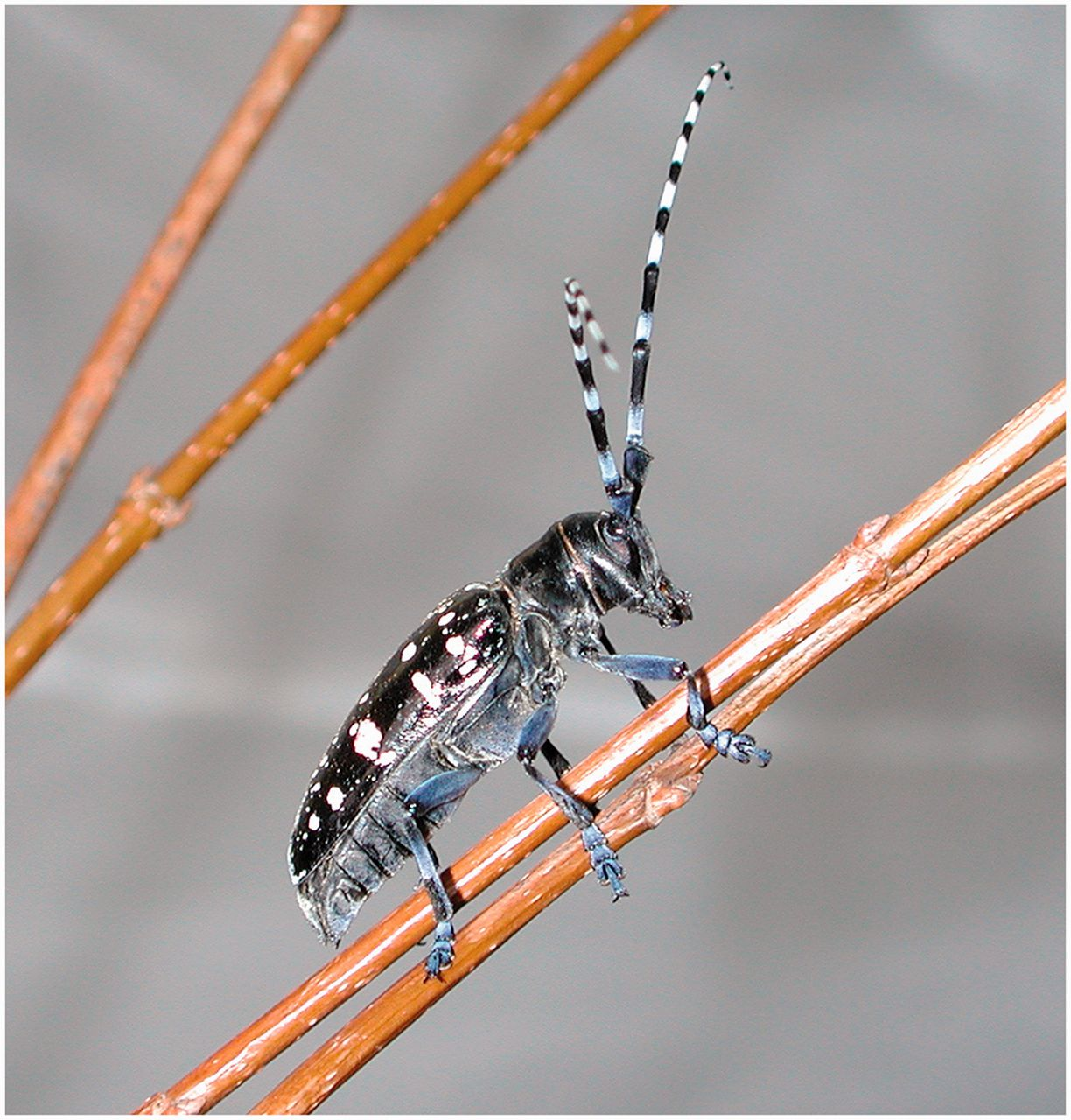
Adult beetle.

== Genomics ==
A chromosome-level genome assembly of the Asian long-horned beetle (Anoplophora glabripennis) was published in 2026. The genome size is approximately 730 Mb, with 96.7% of the assembly anchored to 10 chromosomes. The assembly has a BUSCO completeness of 99.0%, and 23,268 protein-coding genes were predicted.

== As an invasive species ==
Due to high tree mortality caused by larval feeding outside its native range, A. glabripennis can change both forest and urban ecosystems. In the United States, it can potentially destroy 30.3% of urban trees and cause $669 billion in economic loss. Early detection is used to manage infestations before they can spread.

=== Monitoring ===
Tree infestation can be detected by looking for exit holes 3/8 to 3/4 inches in diameter (1–2 cm) often in the larger branches of the crowns of infested trees. Sometimes sap can be seen oozing from the exit holes with coarse sawdust or "frass" in evidence on the ground or lower branches. Dead and dying tree limbs or branches and yellowing leaves when there has been no drought also indicate A. glabripennis infestation. Traps can also be used containing a pheromone and a plant kairomone to attract nearby adults. Some acoustic sensors can also differentiate larval feeding within trees. Dogs can also be trained to detect the smell of frass on trees.

Workers have found and reported infested material in warehouses in CA, FL, IL, IN, MA, MI, NC, NJ, NY, OH, PA, SC, TX, WA, and WI in the United States, and in the Greater Toronto Area in Ontario, Canada. After an aggressive containment program and with the last confirmed sighting in 2007, Canada declared itself free of the beetle on April 5, 2013 and lifted restrictions on the movement of tree materials.

In September 1998, US customs regulations were changed to require wooden packing materials from China be chemically treated or kiln-dried to prevent further infestations of the Asian long-horned beetle from arriving.

=== Quarantine ===
Quarantines have been established around infested areas to prevent accidental spread of A. glabripennis by humans. The use of solid wood packing materials for maritime shipping is regulated for adequate treatment methods at certain ports.

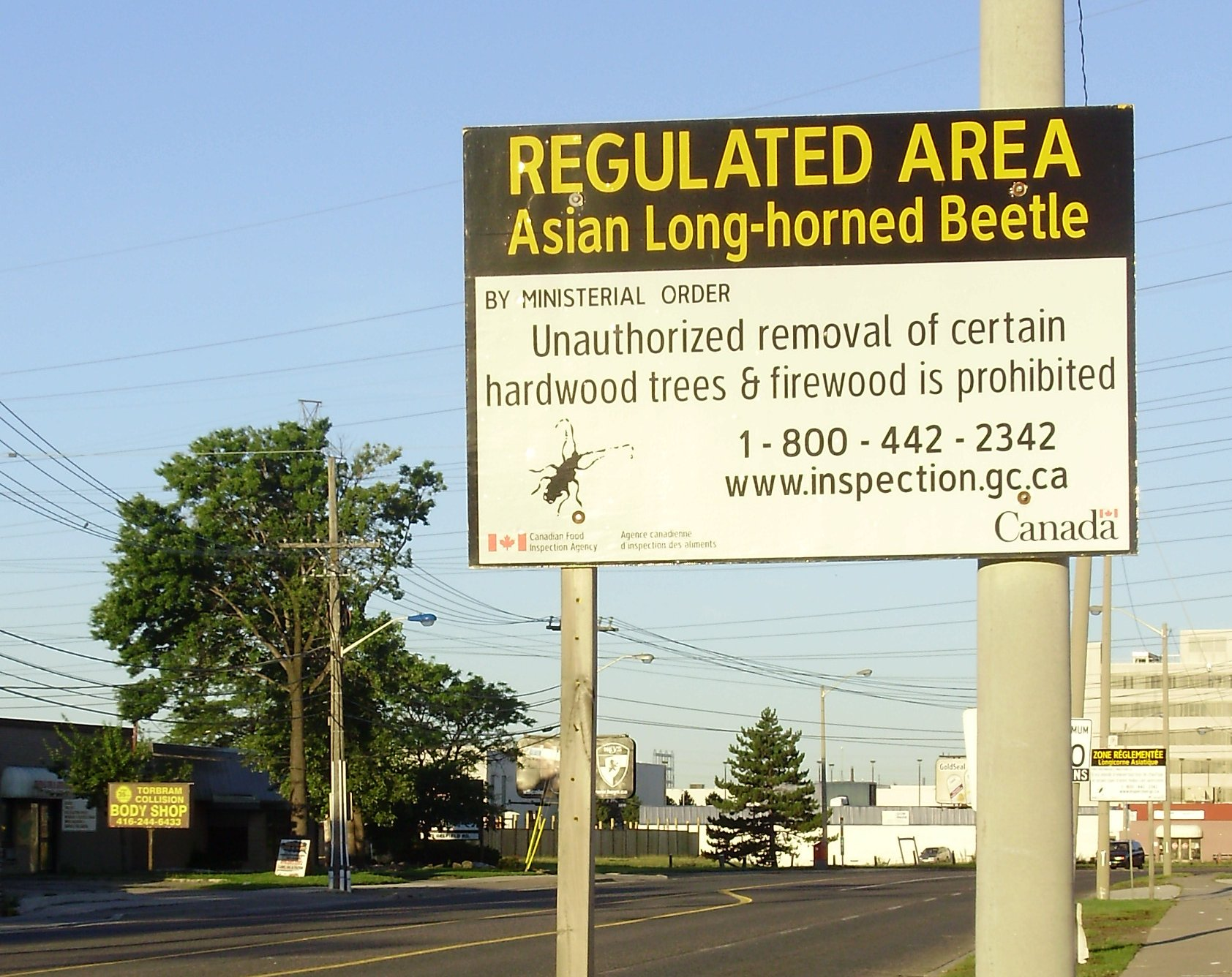
The Canadian Food Inspection Agency is spearheading efforts to fight the ALB infestation in the Greater Toronto Area.

=== Management ===
All infested trees should be removed by certified tree care personnel to ensure that the process is completed properly, and chipped in place, their stumps ground to below the soil level. Insecticides such as imidacloprid, clothianidin, dinotefuran have been used to target adult beetles in canopies or as trunk injections to target larvae. Insecticides within the tree may not translocate evenly, which allows some A. glabripennis to survive treatments. Combined with efficacy concerns, high cost, and non-target effects on other insects, widespread prophylactic treatment of trees in an infestation area concern scientists.

Over 1,550 trees in Chicago have been cut down and destroyed to eradicate A. glabripennis from Chicago. In New York, over 6,000 infested trees resulted in the removal of over 18,000 trees; New Jersey's infestation of over 700 trees led to the removal and destruction of almost 50,000 trees, but infested trees continue to be discovered.

Some resistant trees have been developed that quickly fill oviposition pits with sap or produce callous tissue that encases and kills eggs. Non-host species are typically used to replace removed trees.

Biological control has also been considered in some areas such as China. Fungi, such as Beauveria brongniartii, can increase mortality in larvae and adults while Metarhizium brunneum and Beauveria asiatica can reduce adult survival time. Most parasitoids in the native range of A. glabripennis have a broad host range, and are not suitable as classical biological control agents. Woodpeckers can also be a significant source of mortality. Countries working towards eradicating A. glabripennis typically do not initially utilize biological control.

==== Eradication ====
In areas such as North America where infestations are small, A. glabripennis can potentially be eradicated. As trees are removed or treated, all host trees on public and private property located within an established distance from an infested area are surveyed by trained personnel. Infested areas are re-surveyed at least once per year for 3–5 years after the last beetle or infested tree is found.

In the US, A. glabripennis has been eradicated from Islip, Manhattan, Staten Island, Chicago and Boston. In Canada, it was declared eradicated in Toronto and Vaughan, Ontario, but it was rediscovered there in 2013. In 2019, the U.S. Department of Agriculture declared New York City free of the beetle after a 23-year eradication effort. In June 2020, Marie-Claude Bibeau (the Minister of Agriculture and Agri-Food) and Seamus O'Regan (the Minister of Natural Resources) declared that A. glabripennis had been eradicated in Mississauga and Toronto, the only two areas of known infestation in Canada.

In 2012, the first recorded outbreak of Asian longhorn beetle in the UK was found at Paddock Wood in Kent, near small commercial premises that had imported stone from China. Novel techniques used to control the outbreak included the use of two detection dogs trained in Austria that can smell the beetles in trees. At the end of the first year’s survey, 1,500 trees had been felled and burned from fields and roadsides and 700 from commercial premises and private gardens. The beetle was declared eradicated in 2019.

== See also ==
- Citrus long-horned beetle
- Emerald ash borer
- Forest disturbance of invasive insects and diseases in the United States
