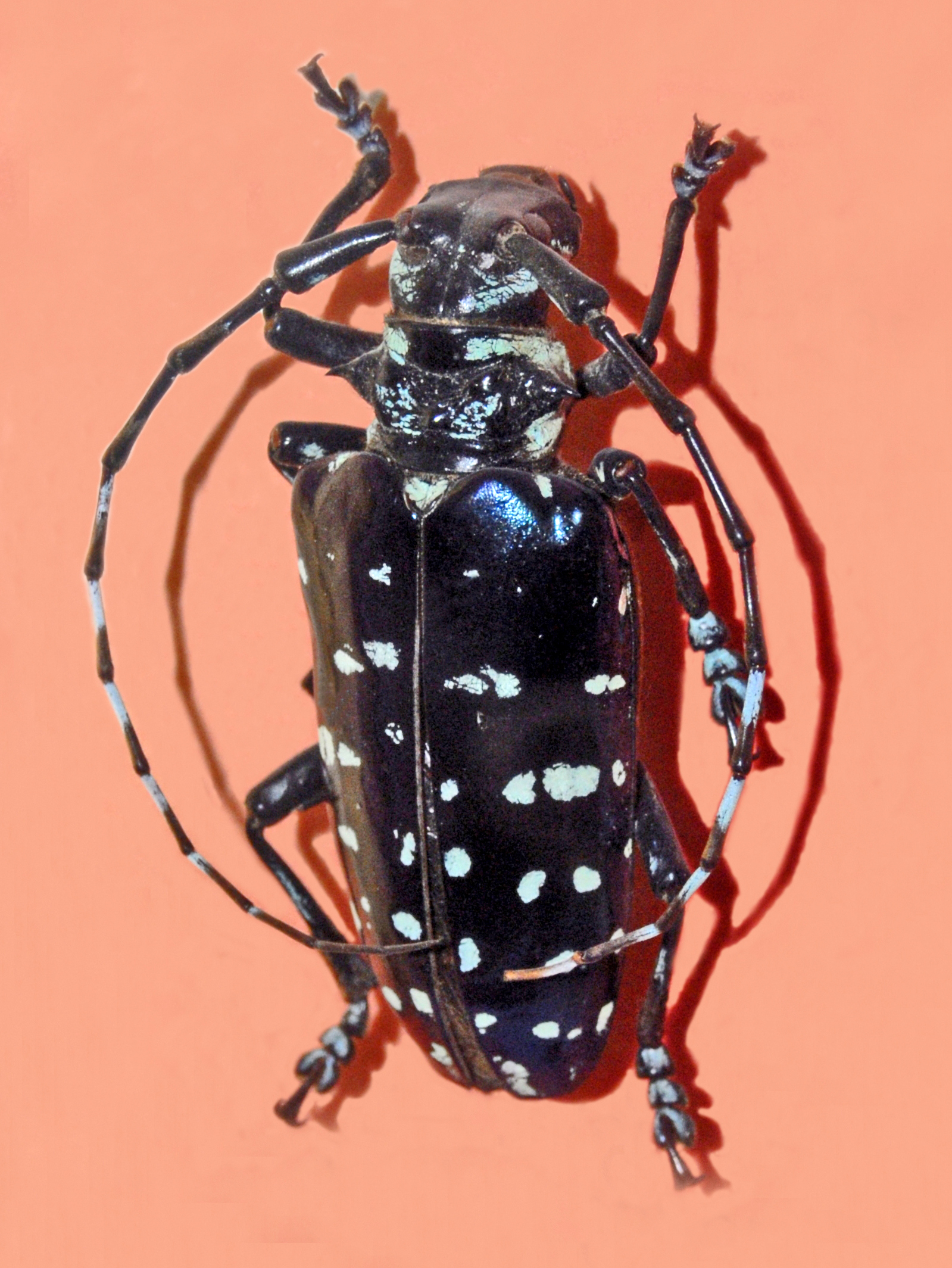
- Museum specimen of Anoplophora sollii

Scientific classification
- Domain: Eukaryota
- Kingdom: Animalia
- Phylum: Arthropoda
- Class: Insecta
- Order: Coleoptera
- Suborder: Polyphaga
- Infraorder: Cucujiformia
- Family: Cerambycidae
- Tribe: Lamiini
- Genus: Anoplophora
- Species: A. sollii

Binomial name
- Anoplophora sollii (Hope, 1839)

Synonyms
- Oplophora sollii Hope, 1839; Calloplophora sollii (Hope) Thomson, 1864

= Anoplophora sollii =

Species of beetle

Anoplophora sollii is a species of beetles in the longhorn beetle family (Cerambycidae).

== Description ==
Anoplophora sollii can reach a length of about 47–57 millimetres (1.9–2.2 in). These beetles are glossy black or bluish, with 20-40 irregular white spots on the elytra and very long ringed antennae.

== Distribution ==
This species can be found in India, Laos, Myanmar, Thailand, Vietnam, China and Taiwan.
