= Alby Weiss =

Australian rules footballer, born 1914

Personal information
- Full name: Albert Weiss
- Born: 18 July 1914
- Died: 19 July 1999 (aged 85)
- Original team: Melbourne High School
- Height: 182 cm (6 ft 0 in)
- Weight: 77 kg (170 lb)
- Position: Half Forward

Playing career^{1}
Years	Club	Games (Goals)
1935–1942	St Kilda	69 (94)
- ^{1} Playing statistics correct to the end of 1942.

Albert Weiss (18 July 1914 – 19 July 1999) was an Australian rules footballer who played for the St Kilda Football Club in the Victorian Football League (VFL).
