= Alby Tame =

Australian rules footballer

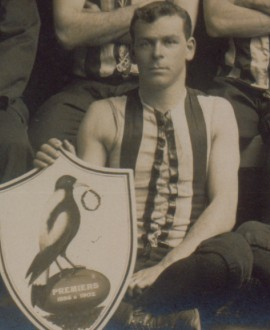
- Tame in 1902

Personal information
- Full name: Albert Edward Tame
- Born: 16 July 1877; Collingwood, Victoria
- Died: 30 April 1965 (aged 87); Fitzroy, Victoria
- Original team: Collingwood Juniors
- Height: 177 cm (5 ft 10 in)
- Weight: 77 kg (170 lb)

Playing career^{1}
Years	Club	Games (Goals)
1897–1900, 1902	Collingwood	29 (2)
- ^{1} Playing statistics correct to the end of 1902.

Albert Edward Tame (16 July 1877 – 30 April 1965) was an Australian rules footballer who played for the Collingwood Football Club in the Victorian Football League (VFL).
