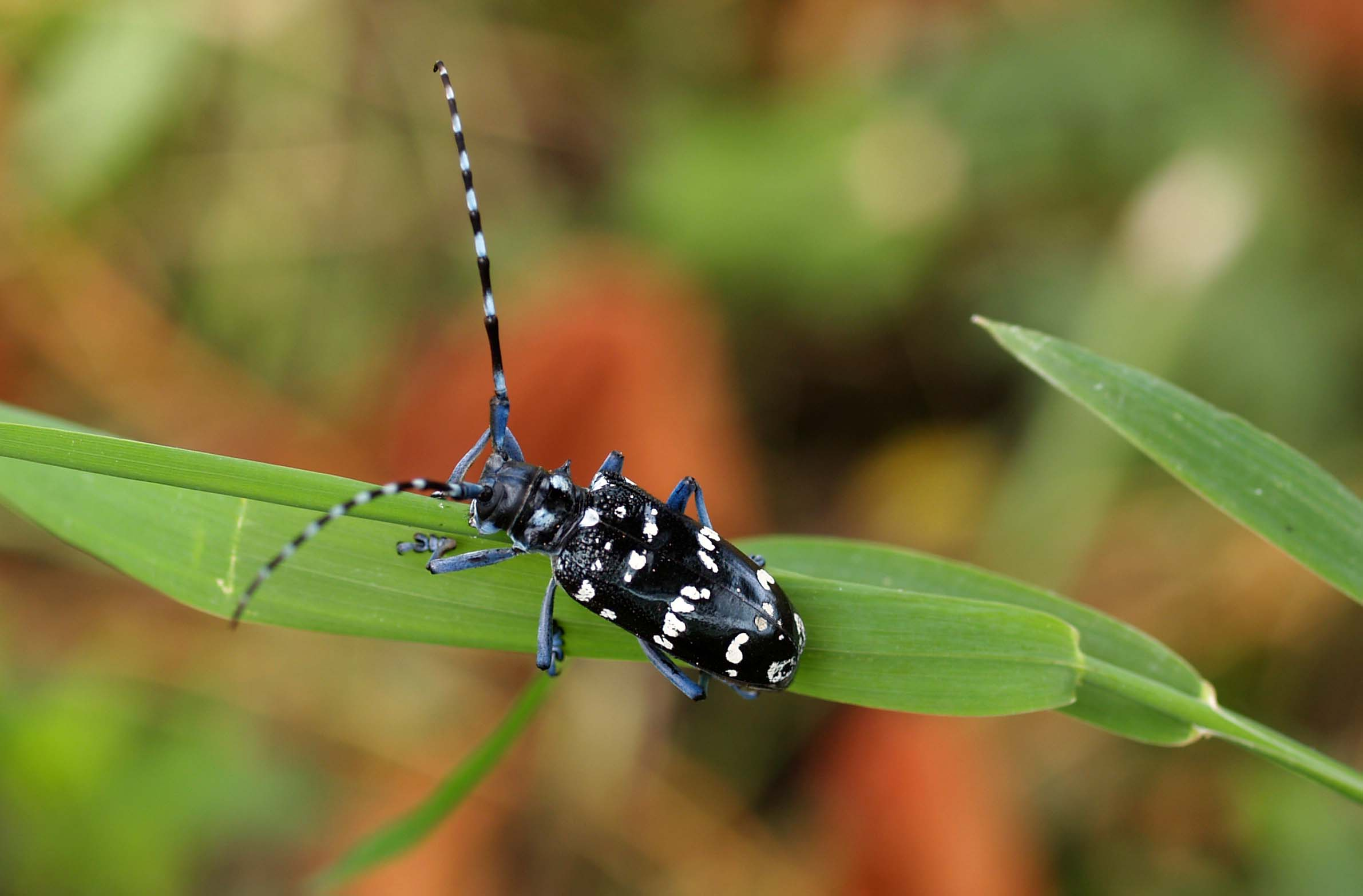

Scientific classification
- Kingdom: Animalia
- Phylum: Arthropoda
- Clade: Pancrustacea
- Class: Insecta
- Order: Coleoptera
- Suborder: Polyphaga
- Infraorder: Cucujiformia
- Family: Cerambycidae
- Genus: Anoplophora
- Species: A. chinensis

Binomial name
- Anoplophora chinensis (Forster, 1771)

Synonyms
- Cerambyx farinosus Houttuyn, 1766 Homo.; Cerambyx chinensis Forster, 1771; Lamia punctator Fabricius, 1776; Cerambyx pulchricornis Voet, 1778 Unav.; Cerambyx sinensis Gmelin in Linnaeus, 1790; Calloplophora abbreviata Thomson, 1865; Calloplophora afflicta Thomson, 1865; Calloplophora luctuosa Thomson, 1865; Calloplophora malasiaca Thomson, 1865; Anoplophora malasiaca (Thomson, 1865); Calloplophora sepulcralis Thomson, 1865; Anoplophora sepulchralis (Thomson, 1865) Lapsus calami; Melanauster perroudi Pic 1953

= Citrus long-horned beetle =

Species of beetle

Anoplophora chinensis, the citrus long-horned beetle (also appearing in many sources as Anoplophora malasiaca), is a long-horned beetle native to Japan, China, Korea, Taiwan and Southeast Asia where it is considered a serious pest. This beetle has invaded several countries in Europe, including Italy, Switzerland, Turkey, France, Germany, and Croatia.

Infestations by the beetle can kill many different types of hardwood trees including Citrus, pecan, apple, Australian pine, Hibiscus, sycamore, willow, pear, mulberry, chinaberry, poplar, Litchi, kumquat, Japanese red cedar, oak, and Ficus.

== Geographic range ==
=== Asia ===
Anoplophora chinensis is native to most parts of China and Korea, as well as Vietnam, Malaysia, Indonesia, and the Philippines. However, this beetle is characterized as an invasive species in many parts of the world, including countries in Europe such as Italy, as it has been able to be transported to additional geographic regions by burrowing into shipments from Asia to countries in Europe. It makes its way into shipments that contain plants or wood and burrows into them.

=== North America ===
The citrus long-horned beetle was first discovered in the U.S. in April 1999, when a single beetle was found in a nursery greenhouse in Athens, Georgia on certain bonsai trees imported from China. The beetle was later discovered in August of 2001, at a Tukwila, Washington nursery near Seattle in a shipment from Korea of 369 bonsai maple trees. Three of the beetles were captured at the nursery, including a mated female ready to lay eggs. However, when the bonsai trees were dissected, eight larvae exit tunnels were found, indicating that five more might have escaped into the surrounding community. Officials concerned with the potential for spread asked residents in the region not to move firewood, even in areas with no known infestations.

=== UK ===
The beetle was found in several sightings in Essex in 2008.

== Habitat ==
A. chinensis generally prefer warm, temperate climates, but not climates that tend to be too hot. Areas around the world known for temperate climates are more likely to be populated by a subspecies of A. chinensis as an invasive species. For example, the temperate climates of the US states Florida and California are likely more at risk for an infestation than other US states. In China, the preferred temperatures are approximately 3 °C-7 °C lower than another subspecies in Italy for optimal growth and development. The exact range of preferred temperatures can also vary depending on the population of 'A. chinensis' in a given region or country. A. chinensis is likely composed of two subspecies, with the other subspecies being Anoplophora malasiaca. A study showed that this subspecies of A. chinensis in China preferred temperatures approximately 3 °C-7 °C lower than a population of A. chinensis in Italy for optimal growth and development.

=== Climate within habitat ===
Anoplophora chinensis generally makes its home in plants and lay their eggs in the roots of plants and trees. They inhabit over 100 different species of plants from 19 families, about half of which are from China, where A. chinensis is a native species. While they inhabit many different types of trees, citrus trees are commonly used for burrowing and subsequent larvae maturation and feeding.

Temperatures are generally more stable in the roots of plants throughout the day as well as throughout the year, and this absence of drastic fluctuations in temperature allow for more of the offspring to pupate and grow into adulthood. However, studies have shown that some fluctuation of temperature is necessary for survival to adulthood. These studies introduced a temperature fluctuation of 20 °C-30 °C at most, demonstrating a mild temperature change but not one that would encompass all of the seasons. This demonstrates that some mild temperature fluctuation is necessary for growth into adulthood, but extreme heat and/or extreme cold will not lead to offspring pupating and surviving to adulthood. For example, temperatures near and above 40 °C tend to stop growth and development altogether.

The preferred climate of A. chinensis can vary depending on the specific region a particular population of the beetle is located in. One example is highlighted in a study showing that a subspecies of A. chinensis in China preferred temperatures approximately 3 °C-7 °C lower than another subspecies in Italy for optimal growth and development. At different larval developmental stages, the beetle prefers different regions of the wood in the plants that they inhabit. Surrounding environments tend to have temperatures approximately 2 °C warmer than the phloem within the wood of plants in this respective area, and the temperature within different parts of the plant varies slightly as well. Wood deeper into a plant tends to have a slightly warmer temperature than wood closer to the outside of a given plant, and developed larvae tend to move deeper into their inhabited plant and feed on deeper wood than less developed larvae.

== Life cycle ==
The citrus long-horned beetle has a life cycle of approximately one to two years. Adult beetles can be found from April to December. They are most active from May to July. Upon developing through all the instars of the larval stage, they then transition to the pupal stage, where they remain for 4-6 weeks. Once citrus long-horned beetles reach the adult stage, they are classified as pre-adults and take about 1-2 weeks to mature. The adult beetles feed on twigs, petioles, and leaf veins for 10-15 days before oviposition.

=== Reproduction ===
Citrus long-horned beetles find mates using contact and short-range pheromones. The host plant for larvae is important for determining longevity and fecundity of adults. Female citrus long-horned beetle lay and deposit individual eggs in tree bark. More specifically, the lower trunk, root collar region, and exposed roots. Females chew into the bark and lay a single egg in the bark tissues, creating a T-shaped oviposition site. Eggs laid during the summer hatch in 1-2 weeks. After the beetle larva hatches, it chews into the tree, forming a tunnel that is then used as a place for pupation. The process of egg laying through adult emergence can take one to two years.

== Food resources ==
=== Larvae ===
Each female citrus long-horned beetle can lay up to 200 eggs after mating, and eggs are generally laid within the wood and plant vascular system of the chosen host plant. When hatched and ready to feed, these larvae bore into the wood of the plant and feed on the phloem-cambium region of the plant in their early larval stage. The citrus longhorn beetle bores deeper into the tree and feeds on the xylem in later larval stages.

=== Adults ===
When newly hatched, adults are not considered fully sexually mature and undergo a period of feeding on tree twigs, or twigs of their host plant, to reach full sexual maturity. Adult Anoplophora chinensis are polyphagous, meaning that they infest and eat a wide variety of plants. While adults infest and feed on generally most tree species they are introduced to, there are particular trees that are more common for them to feed on, as they promote greater survival. A tree commonly fed on is citrus trees, explaining part of the origin of its common name, "citrus longhorned beetle". Additionally, a study showed that urban trees, and specifically the species Acer negundo, Aesculus hippocastanum, Platanus x acerifolia, Quercus rubra, and Tilia platyphyllos, allowed promoted survival more than other urban trees. This study also showed that, between the species tested, the citrus longhorned beetles preferred the two species of the Acer genus: Acer negundo and Acer campestris. Scientists also acknowledged that since Anoplophora chinensis feeds on the majority of plants it encounters, its host range will continue to expand as it infests new regions and discovers new plant species.

== Genomics ==
A chromosome-level genome assembly of the citrus long-horned beetle (Anoplophora malasiaca) was published in 2026. The genome size is approximately 708 Mb, with 95.2% of the assembly anchored to 15 chromosomes. The assembly has a BUSCO completeness of 99.7%, and 23,515 protein-coding genes were predicted.

== Parasitic behaviors ==
Anoplophora chinensis lays its eggs within the roots and vascular system of their host plant. The eggs hatch and spend their larval and pupation stages in the plant vascular system. This infestation damages the host plant, causing it to weaken and eventually die. This parasitism is a main reason that this species' transportation to other countries is commonly referred to as an infestation. Given that A. chinensis often inhabit citrus plants, these plants are most negatively impacted by this beetle's parasitism.

Given the current climate change crisis, the infestation of these beetles has economic implications for many countries, particularly where Anoplophora chinensis is invasive. The parasitic behavior of Anoplophora chinensis, along with the fact that it has now been introduced into several additional continents like Europe and North America, has led to damage in fruit tree plantations, resulting in substantial economic loss.

=== As an invasive species in Europe ===
The citrus long-horned beetle has been further implicated in parasitic behavior as seen in their disruption of the vascular tissue of trees. Researchers in one study collected several adult and larval citrus long-horned beetles from which molecular analyses and physiological traits could be measured. Amplification of specific sequences of the citrus long-horned beetle genome using the polymerase chain reaction confirmed that infestations within wooden tissue in plants was indeed citrus long-horned beetles. In doing so, they proved that DNA extraction from citrus long-horned beetles is a possible mechanism by which researchers can manage invasive beetle outbreaks. Through an analysis of larval frass collected in field studies, researchers can now reliably diagnose citrus long-horned beetle infestation, which can help in the inspections of plants for plant trading as well as facilitate more effective plant management techniques.

== Management ==
Methods of control have been studied in various European countries. In France in 2003, 2 infected Acer platanoides trees near a bonsai greenhouse were found with 11 exit holes and 5 adult beetles. The trees were removed and subsequent surveys were conducted, declaring the pest officially eradicated in 2006.

In Croatia in 2007, exit holes in Lagerstroemia and Acer palmatum in greenhouses indicated an invasion by Citrus long-horned beetles. A quarantine was enacted on these plants following this discovery and infested plants were burned. Plants that contained larvae were destroyed and up until 2010, the movement of plants in the nursery was prohibited. Croatia's status in eradicating these beetles is transient.

In Rome, Italy, in 2008, 15 adults and 48 exit holes were discovered in 7 Acer negundo trees and 5 Aesculus hippocastanum. The number of infected trees increased by 27 between 2008 and 2009. Infested plants and surrounding plants were removed and dissected. The Citrus long-horned beetle infests the base but lays eggs higher up in trees. However, no signs of infestation were seen in nearby plants. In Lombardy, beetles were shown to produce frass in every developmental stage during the growing season.

In the Netherlands in 2007, exit holes were found in Acer palmatum. Plants within a 300m radius were removed and checked for the Citrus long-horned beetle. Further study of infested plants revealed that infestation can occur without obvious symptoms. Unlike in Italy, the beetles in the Netherlands produced no frass, which could be attributed to less active larvae due to the cooler climate. The Dutch climate could have played a significant role in the spread of the beetles. This is because the summers are cooler than the other European countries mentioned and the native countries of China and Japan. The cooler climate can cause the Citrus long-horned beetle to develop slower, increasing the chances of eradication. Additionally, a cool climate can lead to a lower reproduction rate; 28 larvae and 24 exit holes found in the Westland region of the Netherlands suggests difficulty in starting a 2nd generation along with spreading.

== Physiology ==
Olfaction, particularly the chemosensory receptors of Anoplophora chinensis, contribute to reproduction by influencing mate recognition and locating oviposition sites. Oviposition sites are specific locations (or in this case, specific points on or inside the plant) where Anoplophora chinensis lays its eggs. The chemosensory receptors of the beetle include two types of olfactory receptors: ORs, or odorant receptors, and IRs, or ionotropic receptors. These chemosensory receptors are types of pheromone receptors and are made of a complex combination of lipids.

For females, these phospholipids are condensed on the cuticles, acting as a recognition signal for males to attract them. Females are attracted by the scent of a newly killed male citrus longhorned beetle. Both of these pheromone signals are generally detected within a relatively close range. These pheromones, and the male-secreted pheromones in particular, are secreted by a wide variety of species, especially from the genus Monochamus.

=== Impact on mating ===
The mating processes of Anoplophora chinensis depend primarily on pheromone secretion and reception, with very little dependence on visual cues. As with the general odorant receptors and ionotropic receptors, research suggests that all pheromones that are secreted during mate location as well as the mating process itself are generally short range.

While the female receptors are located within the female's cuticles, the male receptors are located on the male's antennae. In 1998 Qiao Wang at the Massey University Institute of Natural Resources demonstrated that these pheromones are most active between male and female beetles, as males did not detect any freshly dead male beetle until the male was physically touching it with his antennae, but he could detect a freshly dead female via pheromone reception. While searching for a mate involves receptors that receive signals from a short distance, mating behaviors themselves are enforced mostly by contact pheromones, with some reception of short-range volatile sex pheromones.

== Gallery ==
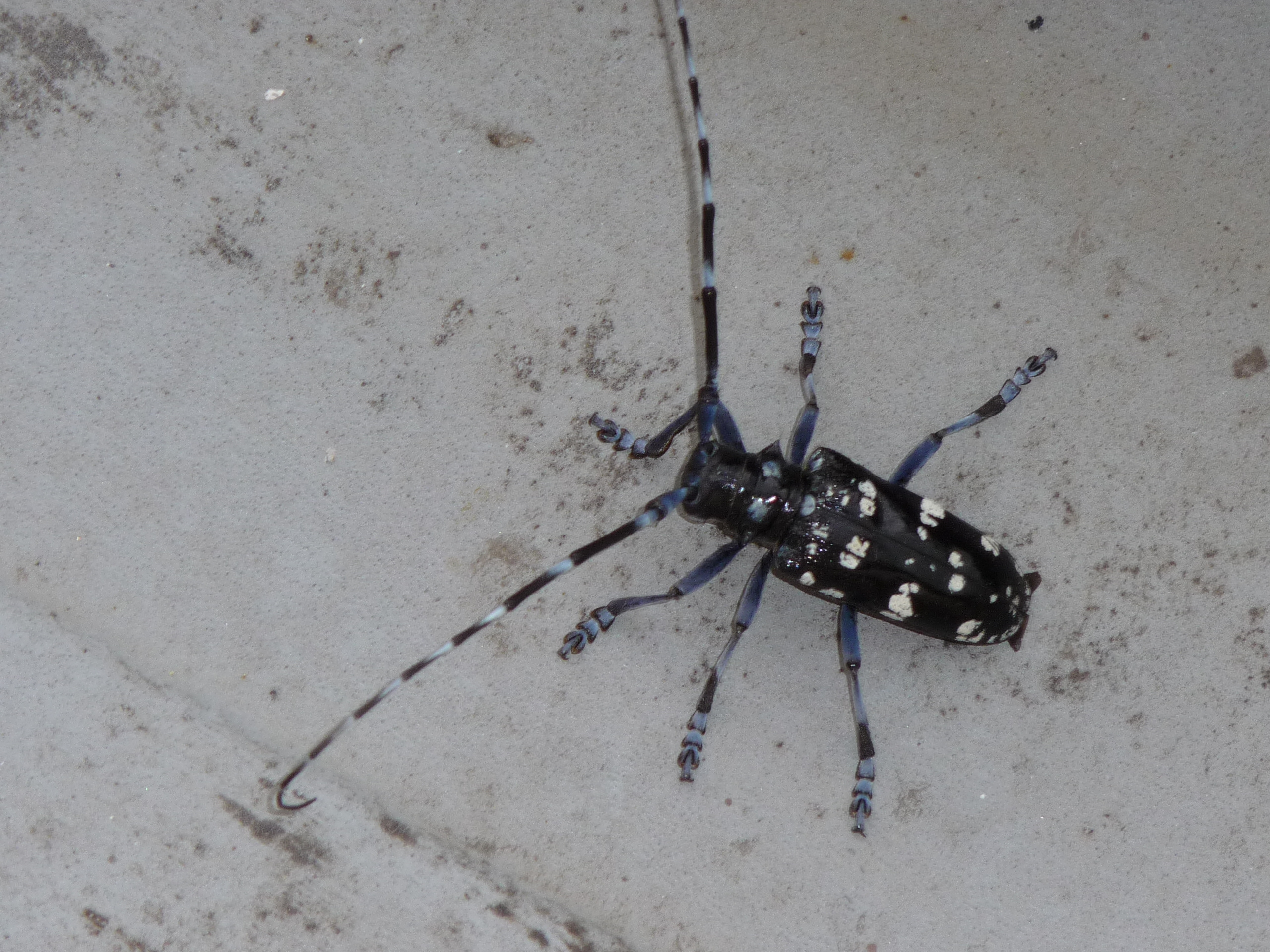
Male, in Japan
