= Albes =

Albes or Albés is a surname. Notable people with the surname include:

- Emil Albes (1861–1923), German actor
- Rubén Albés (born 1985), Spanish footballer and manager

== See also ==
- Albus (surname)
