= Earle Albee =

American politician and restaurant owner

Earle Wesley Albee, Sr.

Member of the Maine House of Representatives
- In office 1949–1954

Member of the Maine Senate
- In office 1955–1956

Personal details
- Born: March 17, 1898 Hallowell, Maine, U.S.
- Died: February 10, 1963 (aged 64) Pinellas County, Florida, U.S.
- Party: Republican
- Occupation: Politician, restaurateur

Earle Wesley Albee, Sr. (March 17, 1898 – February 10, 1963) was an American politician and restaurant owner from Hallowell, Maine. Albee, a Republican from Portland, served in the Maine House of Representatives from 1949 to 1954 and in the Maine Senate from 1955 to 1956. During his time in office, Albee was a proponent of Maine adopting a sales tax.

He was sentenced in May 1957 for accepting money under the pretense of having a drunk driving charge dismissed. He was found guilty and sentenced to two to four years in prison. In May 1958, Albee's request for clemency was denied by Governor Edmund Muskie and the Executive Council.

He died in Pinellas County, Florida, aged 64. He is buried at Portland's Evergreen Cemetery.
