= Albysjön =

Albysjön is the name of several Swedish lakes:

- Albysjön, Botkyrka between Botkyrka and Huddinge
- Albysjön, Tyresö in Tyresö
