= Alby De Luca =

Australian rules footballer, born 1908

Personal information
- Full name: Albert Edward De Luca
- Born: 9 November 1908; Wollongong, New South Wales
- Died: 30 June 1978 (aged 69); Hampton, Victoria
- Original team: Prahan / Sandringham
- Height: 179 cm (5 ft 10 in)
- Weight: 80 kg (176 lb)

Playing career^{1}
Years	Club	Games (Goals)
1934–1935	Carlton	32 (22)
1936	Hawthorn	10 (9)
Total		42 (31)
- ^{1} Playing statistics correct to the end of 1936.

Albert Edward De Luca (9 November 1908 – 30 June 1978) was an Australian rules footballer who played for the Carlton Football Club and Hawthorn Football Club in the Victorian Football League (VFL).
