= Alby Barlow =

Australian cyclist (born 1916)

Personal information
- Full name: Alby Barlow
- Born: 1916 Gisborne, Victoria, Australia

Cycling career
- Sport: Cycling
- Role: Rider

Alby Barlow (born 1916) was an Australian racing cyclist from 1935 who rode for Oakleigh. In 1947 he was the Australian 100 miles road champion and holder of the 25, 50 and 100 miles Australian unpaced road records.

In 1935, his first year as a professional, Barlow was 9th in the Tour of Gippsland over 140 miles (230 km) off a handicap of 41'. He was then 4th in the Phillip Island Grand Prix over 55 miles (89 km).

In 1936 Barlow won the Melbourne to Sale on a handicap of 16'. He also rode the Warrnambool to Melbourne off a handicap of 9', finishing 50th. Despite his prominence as a road rider, Barlow never featured in the results of the Warrnambool. In 1947 he was part of a disappointing scratch group that finished 5' 26" down on the fastest time of Keith Rowley.

Barlow won the opening event of the 1937 season, over 35 miles (56 km) in a course record. While best known for his road racing, he also competed on the track. In 1937 he won a 5-mile points race at Bendigo. He then won the A grade section of the Barnet Glass Grand Prix, of 160 miles (260 km), over tile Black Spur. He was just beaten by Thurgood and, Moritz in the sprint for the line in the Sale Grand Prix of 100 miles (160 km). He was second fastest off scratch in the Healing Midlands Tour of 110 miles (180 km) and was third to Moritz, in the Australian 100 miles (160 km) championship.

Barlow was third fastest in the Goulburn to Sydney in 1938, behind Bill Moritz. In November he travelled to Nouméa as part of a team supported by the Referee, which reported that on 1 January 1939 Barlow won two track events and finished second in an eight-lap event and created two records, and followed that up with a win in a road race over 2 days.

In 1939 Barlow narrowly defeated Moritz in the Melbourne - Bendigo race over 92 miles (148 km) with a handicap of 6'. He was third to Dean Toseland in the Sale Grand Prix, and rode well in the Tour of Gippsland. He was initially suspended for one month for accepting assistance from a rider who had abandoned, threatening his participation in the Sydney six-day race. At the end of the year he was rated as the 7th best professional road rider in Australia.

The Mt Gambier 100 which in 1947 carried with it the title of Australian 100 miles road champion, was on the second race Barlow finished in 1947. He defeated Keith Thurgood, Les Dunne and Max Rowley in a new course record.

In late 1947 Barlow broke a series of unpaced road records, starting with the record for 25 miles (40 km) out and home in 1hr 1' 17" breaking the time of Frankie Thomas from 1933. He followed that up with records for 50 miles (80 km) out and home in 2hr 11' 10", riding the first 25 miles (40 km) in 56' 25". He then set his sights on the 100 miles (160 km) record which he set with a time of 4hr 39' 12" on 15 December.

In May 1948 Barlow travelled to England and then to France where he competed in the Grand Prix des Nations, an individual time trial over 140 km (87 mi), the Esperazza Grand Prix and the Nantes Grand Prix. In Barlow's words, "I got the pants towelled off me in the Grand Prix Des Nations, but went much better in the other two races." Barlow travelled to Valkenburg, the Netherlands for the UCI Road World Championships however he was hit by another rider whilst training over the course and was forced to withdraw. Barlow was reported to have entered the 1949 Paris–Roubaix, however it is unclear if he started the race. In any event he did not finish.

In 1949 he was riding in the United States, with his first objective a trans America record attempt, but was delayed by snowfall in Arizona. He rode in a six-day event in New York at the end of February 1950 but walked off the track after 3 days following a dispute with race official Reggie McNamara, the former Australian champion.

== Palmares ==
1936
1st Melbourne to Sale
1939
1st Melbourne - Bendigo
1947
1st Australian 100 miles road championship
Australian records for 25, 50 and 100 miles (40, 80 and 160 km)
1948
unplaced Grand Prix des Nations
unplaced Esperazza Grand Prix
unplaced Nantes Grand Prix
DNS UCI Road World Championships
