= Alby Palmer =

Australian rules footballer

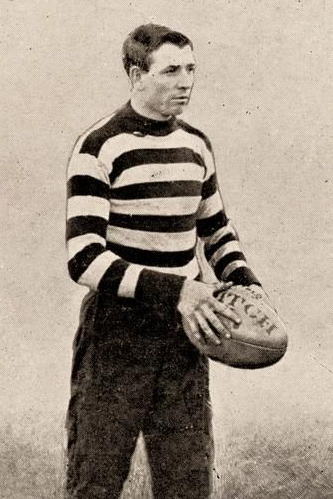
- Palmer in 1910

Personal information
- Full name: Albert James Palmer
- Born: 22 July 1885; Geelong, Victoria
- Died: 3 July 1962 (aged 76); Kensington, Victoria
- Position: Defence

Playing career^{1}
Years	Club	Games (Goals)
1906–1907, 1909–1911	Geelong	49 (1)
- ^{1} Playing statistics correct to the end of 1911.

Albert James Palmer (22 July 1885 – 3 July 1962) was an Australian rules footballer who played for the Geelong Football Club in the Victorian Football League (VFL).

Alby Palmer played from 1906 to 1911. He scored 1 goal in his 49-game career with the Geelong Football Club.
