= Albie (given name) =

Albie is a given name, a variant spelling of Alby and a pet form of Albert.

Notable people and characters with the name include:

== People ==
- Albert Axelrod (1921–2004), American Olympic medalist foil fencer
- Albie Booth (1908–1959), American college football player
- Albie Casiño (born 1993), Filipino actor
- Albie Grant (1943–2004), American basketball player
- Albie Hecht, American television producer and media executive
- Albie Lopez (born 1971), American baseball player
- Albie Morkel (born 1981), South African cricketer
- Albie Murphy (1930–2000), Irish footballer
- Albie Pearson (1934–2023), American baseball player
- Albie Reisz (1917–1985), American football player
- Albie Roles (1921–2012), English football player and manager
- Albie Sachs (born 1935), South African activist and former judge
- Albie Thomas (1935–2013), Australian middle- and long-distance runner
- Albie Thoms (1941–2012), Australian film director, writer and producer

== Fictional characters ==
- Albie, the title character of Albie (TV series), a 2002–2004 British animated television series, as well as several books.
- Albie Watts, a fictional character from the British TV soap, EastEnders.
- Albie Di Grasso, a character in season 2 of The White Lotus

== See also ==
- Alby (nickname)
