= Alby O'Connor =

Australian rules footballer

Personal information
- Full name: Albert O'Connor
- Born: 23 October 1893; Richmond, Victoria
- Died: 28 August 1944 (aged 50); Melbourne, Victoria

Playing career^{1}
| Years | Club | Games (Goals) |
| 1915, 1918 | Essendon | 13 (1) |
- ^{1} Playing statistics correct to the end of 1918.

Albert O'Connor (23 October 1893 – 28 August 1944) was an Australian rules footballer who played for the Essendon Football Club in the Victorian Football League (VFL).
